= List of Red Funnel ships =

The following list is of Ferries and boats that have been operated by Red Funnel.

Between 1840 and the 1960s, Red Funnel line and its predecessors operated 40 different classic passenger ferries, many of these being paddle steamers. Later ferries sometimes had space allocated for carrying cars but it was not until 1959 that the first purpose-built car ferry was introduced. Classic passenger vessels continued in service until the Balmoral was sold in 1969.

== Paddle steamers ==
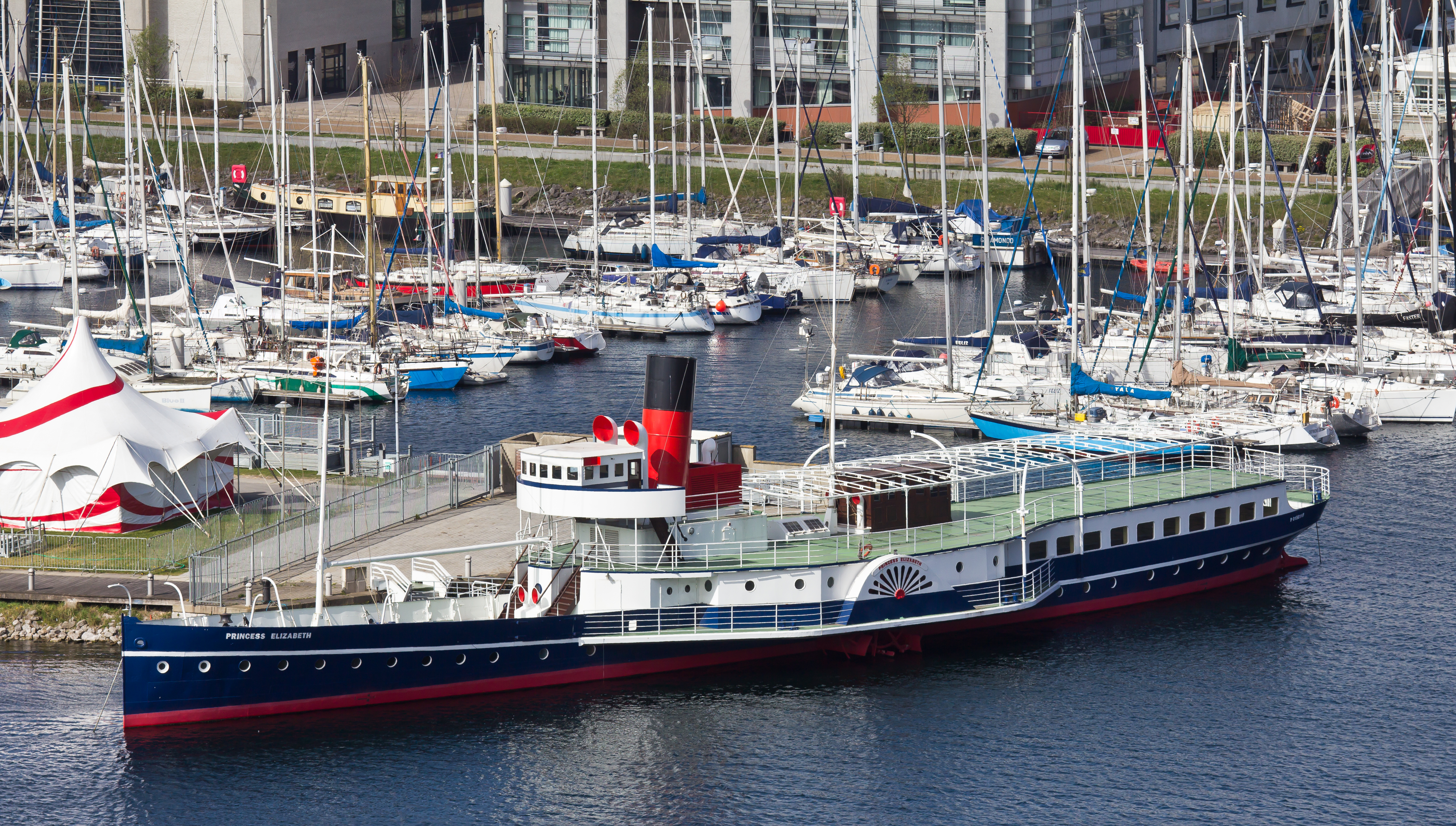
PS Princess Elizabeth

Ship	Service	Notes
PS Gem	1840–1883	
PS Ruby	1841–1872	The first Isle of Wight steamer to be built of iron
PS Pearl	1844–1867	
PS Queen (I)	1848–1876	
PS Medina (I)	1852–1882	
PS Emerald	1857–1871	
PS Sapphire	1860–1873	
PS Lord of the Isles	1861–1889	
PS Lady of the Lake	1861–1887	
PS Vectis	1866–1910	
PS Southampton	1872–1902	
PS Carisbrooke	1876–1905	
PS Prince Leopold	1876–1905	
PS Princess Beatrice	1880–1930	
PS Princess Helena	1883–1950	Sent to Dunkirk in 1940
PS Her Majesty	1885–1940	Sunk during an air raid on Southampton
PS Princess of Wales	1888–1888	Sunk during trials in Scotland before entering service
PS Bangor Castle	1888–1899	Ex-PS Palmerston chartered to replace the sunken Princess of Wales
PS Solent Queen	1889–1948	Sent to Dunkirk in 1940
PS Prince of Wales	1891–1937	
PS Lorna Doone	1891–1947	
PS Duchess of York	1896–1949	HM Minesweeper 0102 1916–1922. Renamed Duchess of Cornwall in 1928
PS Victoria (I)	1899–1900	Launched 1881. Ex-London & South Western Railway and London, Brighton and South Coast Railway. Status unclear. Transfer recorded in official register but no mention on Red Funnel's records
PS Balmoral (I)	1900–1947	
PS Queen (II)	1902–1938	Renamed Mauretania in 1936 then renamed Corfe Castle in 1938
PS Princess Royal	1906–1906	Not accepted after trials and sold to Cosens & Co Ltd. Renamed Emperor of India
PS Stirling Castle	1907–1916	Sunk off Malta on war service
PS Bournemouth Queen	1908–1957	
PS Lord Elgin	1908–1955	
PS Princess Mary	1911–1919	Sank in the Mediterranean after colliding with the sunken wreck of HMS Majestic
PS Princess Elizabeth	1927–1959	Sent to Dunkirk in 1940. Appeared in the 1962 Walt Disney film In Search of the Castaways. Now moored at Dunkirk as a conference centre
PS Gracie Fields	1936–1940	As HMS Gracie Fields she was sunk at Dunkirk
PS Lorna Doone (II)	1949–1952	Ex-Queen of Kent, ex-HMS Atherstone
PS Solent Queen (II)	1949–1951	Ex-Queen of Thanet, ex-HMS Melton

== Twin-screw steamers ==
Ship	Service	Notes
TSS Upton	1946–1950	Purchased from Birkenhead Corporation
TSS Robina	1948–1949	Purchased from Coast Lines Ltd

=== Motor vessels ===
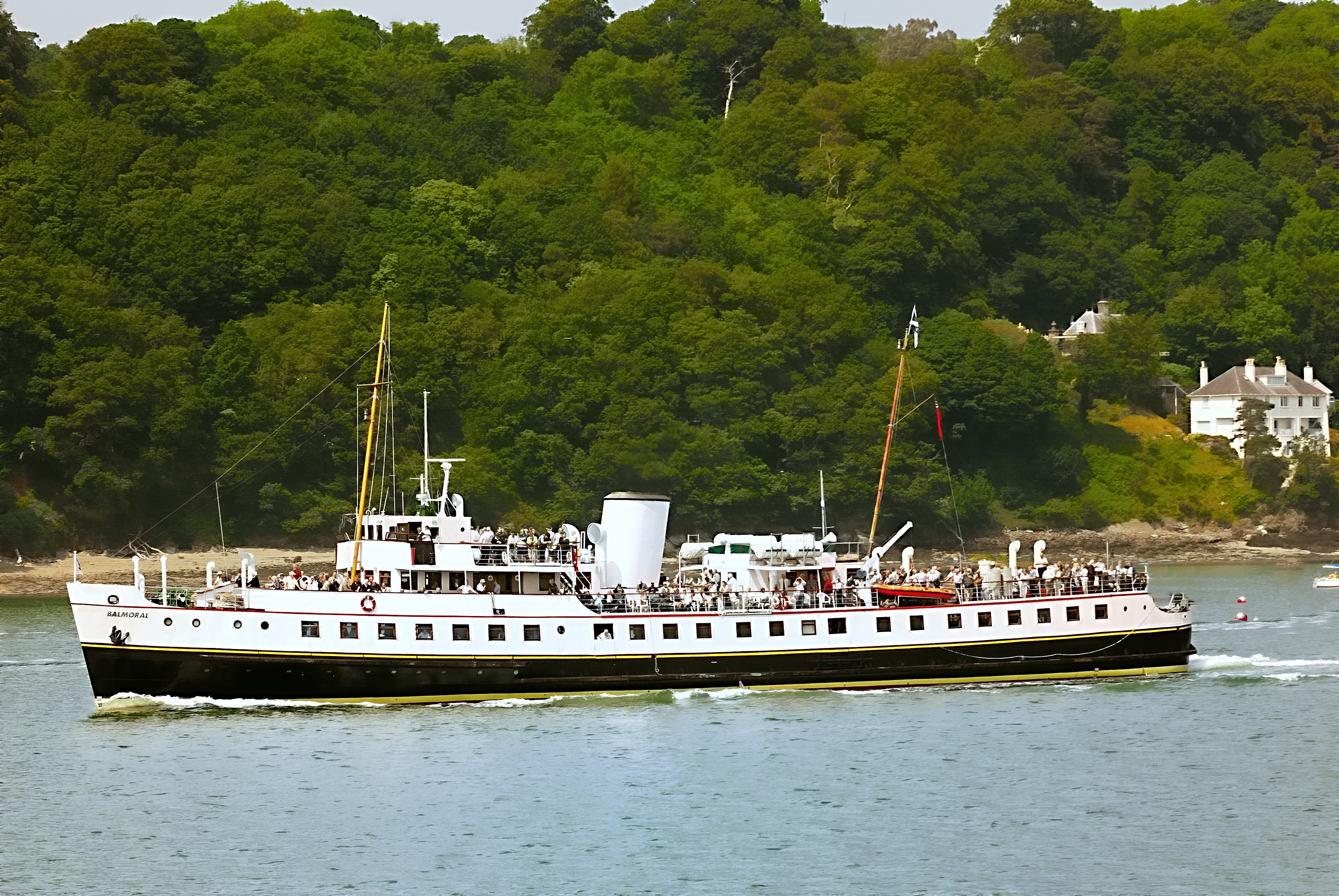
The Balmoral in Waverley Excursions ownership

Ship	Service	Notes
MV Medina (III)	1931–1962	The first diesel engined ferry on the Solent
MV Vecta (I)	1938–1965	2 × English Electric 6LM type diesels. Sold to P & A Campbell, renamed Westward Ho
MV Balmoral (II)	1949–1969	Operated by P & A Campbell from 1968 to 1980. In 1981 she was sold for use as a floating nightclub in Dundee. Bought in 1985 by Waverley Excursions, she acted as the sister ship of the Waverley until 2012. Entered service on 19 June 2015 with White Funnel Ltd.

=== Car ferries ===
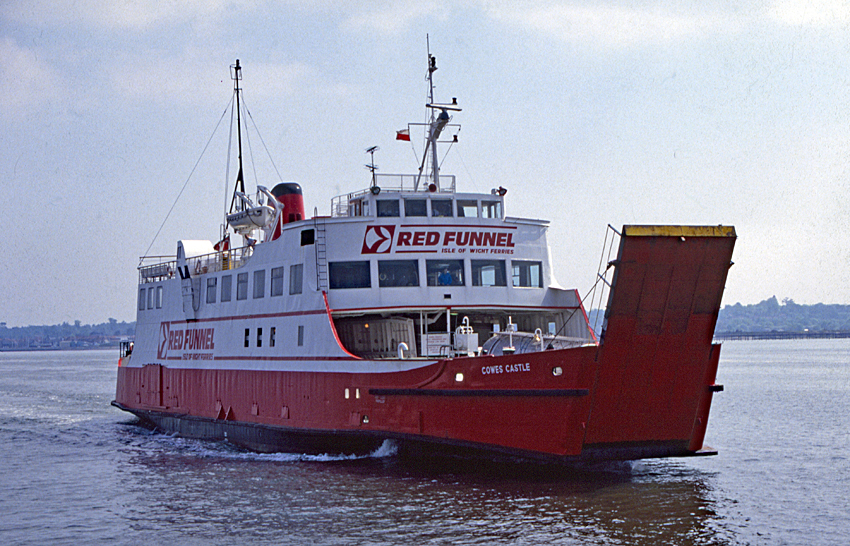
MV Cowes Castle approaching Town Quay

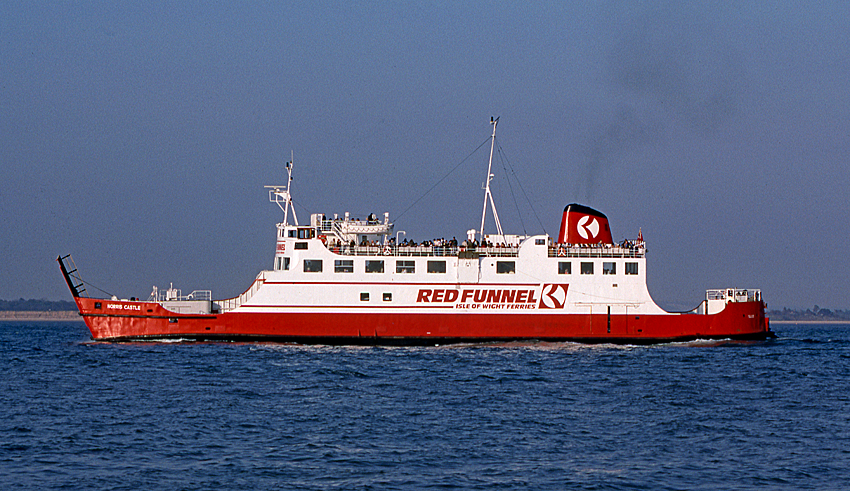
MV Norris Castle, in the Solent

Although some earlier ferries provided space for cars, Red Funnel introduced its first purpose-built car ferry in 1959. Besides the Raptor-class vessels that are still in service, the following car ferries have been used by Red Funnel:

Ship	Service	Notes
MV Norris Castle (II)	1947–1962	Ex-LCT 828
MV Carisbrooke Castle	1959–1974	Sold to Italy and renamed Citta di Meta. Scrapped 2007
MV Osborne Castle	1962–1978	Sold to Canada and renamed Le Gobelet d'Argent, then Le Maxim, then Cavalier Maxim
MV Cowes Castle	1965–1994	Sold to Croatia and renamed Nehaj. Scrapped 2008
MV Norris Castle (III)	1968–1994	Sold to Croatia and renamed Lovrjenac. Scrapped 2008
MV Netley Castle	1974–1997	Sold to Croatia and renamed Sis
MV Bergen Castle	2003–2005	Ex-Nordhordland, purchased to maintain a three-boat service during refit period of current fleet. Sold and renamed Stella

== Fast passenger ferries ==
The first fast ferry introduced by Red Funnel was the Sea Coach Island Enterprise, a motor cruiser capable of carrying 11 passengers at 20 knots. She was built by the British Power Boat Company in Hythe, and operated from 1933 to 1938.

=== Hovercraft ===
In 1968 the company ran trials with a Hovermarine HM2 sidewall hovercraft, number 002, in order to compete with the Seaspeed service which used an SRN6 between Southampton and Cowes. Due to the unreliability of the craft it never entered passenger service. In 1981 Red Funnel acquired a pair of HM2 MkIIIs, GH2019 & GH2024, which were primarily used on the charter service for Vosper Thorneycroft transporting workers from the Isle of Wight to the Woolston yard and back each day. These two craft were disposed of in June 1982 and the charter was subsequently operated by the augmented hydrofoil fleet.

=== Hydrofoils ===
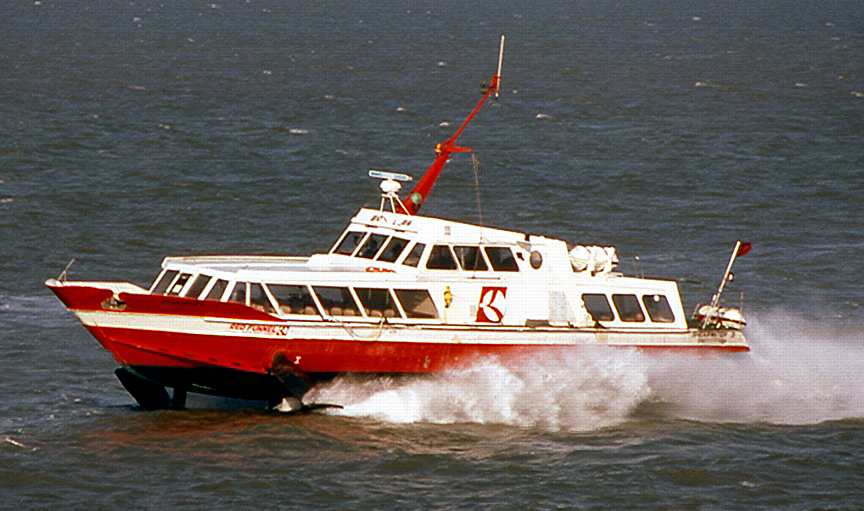
Shearwater 3 at speed on Southampton Water

The first hydrofoils to operate on the Southampton to Cowes route, and the first in commercial service in the United Kingdom were the Italian-designed Shearwater and Shearwater 2. These were introduced by Red Funnel in 1969, and each seated 54 passengers. They were replaced in 1973 by two 67-seat RH70 hydrofoils, built by Cantière Navale Rodriguez, named Shearwater 3 and Shearwater 4. The latter was delivered some five months after the former and in the interim, a PT20 craft, Fleccia di Reggio, was chartered to stand in. In 1982 Shearwater 5 and Shearwater 6 were added to the fleet. In 1991, with the introduction of the first Red Jet catamarans, the hydrofoils were demoted to backup duties until they were finally withdrawn in 1998.

=== Red Jets ===
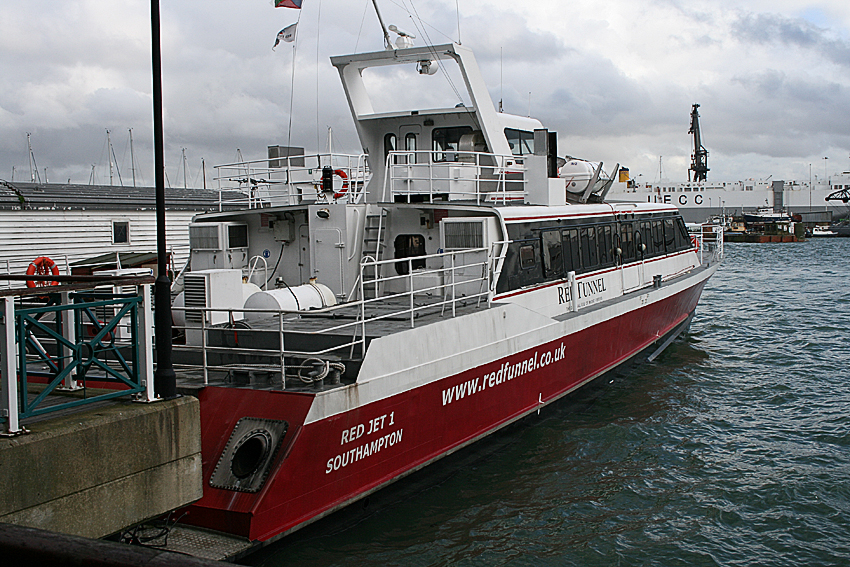
Red Jet 1 at Town Quay

Ship	Service	Notes
Red Jet 1	1991–2009	Sold to Caspian Mainport, renamed CM Jet 1.
Red Jet 2	1991–2009	Sold to Caspian Mainport, renamed CM Jet 2.
Red Jet 3	1998–2019	Sold to Adriatic Fast Ferries in Split, Croatia. Renamed Adriatic Express.
Red Jet 4	2003–2024	Sold to Namhae Express Co in South Korea.
Red Jet 5	2009–2016	Ex-Bo Hengy. Sold to Italy and renamed Schiopparello Jet.

== Tugs and tug tenders ==
Some tugs also had passenger accommodation to enable them to serve as tenders to liners not berthing in Southampton and to augment the excursion fleet on occasion.

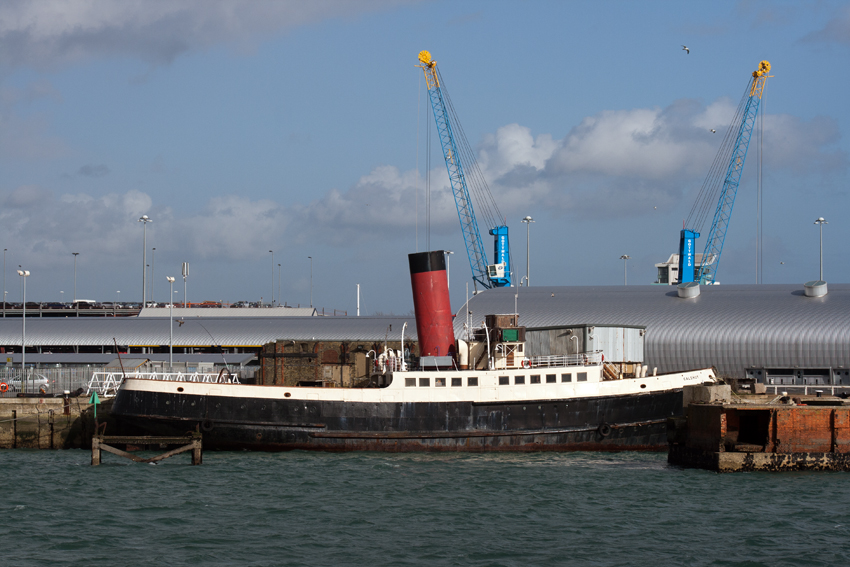
Preserved tug-tender Calshot moored at Southampton

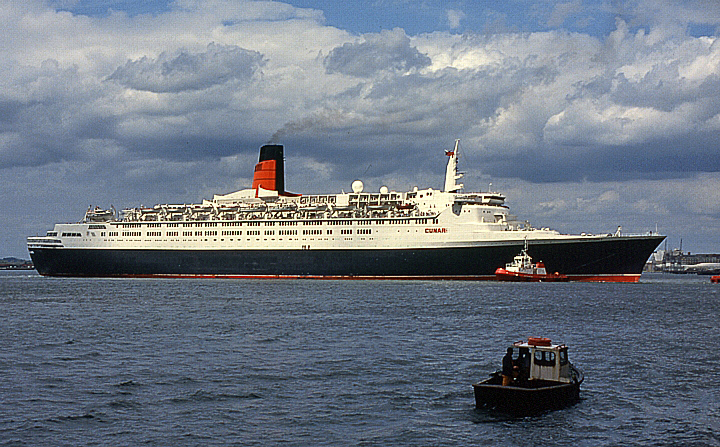
Red Funnel tug Chale turning the Queen Elizabeth 2

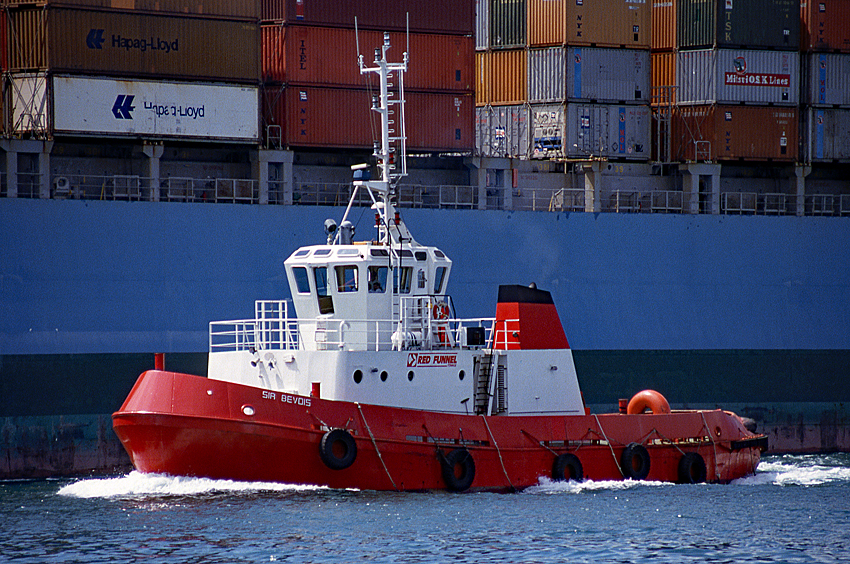
Sir Bevois (III) tug

Ship	Service	Notes
ST Sovereign	1885–1894	
ST Alexandra	1885–1897	
ST Fawn	1885–1897	
TSS T/T Albert Edward	1886–1934	
TSST Hercules	1890–1927	
TSST Vulcan	1893–1957	Rescued the SS New York after her near collision with the RMS Titanic
TSST Ajax	1894–1936	
TSST Neptune (I)	1896–1904	
TSST Hector	1903–1958	One of the tugs that assisted RMS Titanic on her maiden voyage
TSST Neptune (II)	1910–1961	One of the tugs that assisted RMS Titanic on her maiden voyage
TSST Sir Bevois (I)	1916–1941	Sunk during an air raid in Plymouth
ST Minas	1920–1931	
ST Ascupart	1922–1927	
ST Morglay	1922–1927	
TSST Canute	1923–1965	
TSST Clausentum	1926–1966	
TSS T/T Calshot (I)	1930–1964	Sold and renamed Galway Bay. Preserved at Southampton in 1986 as Calshot. Scrapped in 2022.
ST Empire Lilliput	1944–1947	Managed for Ministry of War Transport
ST TID 69	1944–1947	Managed for Ministry of War Transport
ST Bantam	1946–1958	
TSS T/T Paladin	1946–1960	She appeared in the 1959 Peter Sellers film The Mouse That Roared to transport the Grand Fenwick army from France to invade America.
ST Beamish	1951–1952	Ex-Queensgarth, ex-Empire Paul. Later renamed Thunder Cape
TSST Hamtun (I)	1953–1970	
TSST Sir Bevois (II)	1953–1968	
TSMT Atherfield	1956–1971	
TSMT Culver	1956–1983	
TSMT Dunnose	1958–1980	
TSM T/T Gatcombe (I)	1960–1969	
TSMT Thorness	1961–1983	
TSM T/T Calshot (II)	1964–1985	Sold in 1987 to Antrefo. Sold in 1989 to Dublin Bay Cruises and renamed Tara II. Then to Remolques del Mediterraneo SA in 1992 and renamed Boluda Abrego. Scrapped in 2012.
MT Bonchurch	1966–1983	Ex-Baie Comeau, ex-Abeille No 13, ex-TID 174
TSMT Chale	1965–1986	
MT Gatcombe (II)	1970–1997	Sold and renamed Multratug 6
MT Vecta (II)	1970–1999	Sold and renamed Multratug 8, renamed Serwal 4
TSMT Clausentum (II)	1980–1993	Sold and renamed Strathfoyle, renamed Westlund
TSMT Gurnard	1982–1985	Ex-Aziebank, ex-Azie
TSMT Totland	1982–1985	Ex-Europabank, ex-Europa
TSMT Hamtun (II)	1985–2002	Renamed Multratug 16
TSMT Sir Bevois (III)	1985–2002	Renamed Svitzer Bevois, renamed Beaver
TSMT Portunus	1985–1993	Ex-John af Goteborg, resumed name of John af Goteborg, renamed John
TSMT Redbridge	1995–2002	Renamed Adsteam Redbridge, renamed Svitzer Redbridge

== Medina crossing ==
Ship	Service	Notes
SL Precursor (I)	1867–1883	
SL Princess Louise	1871–1944	Sunk in collision with a landing craft off Town Quay shortly before D-Day
SL Medina (II)	1884–1931	
SL Precursor (II)	1898–1939	Requisitioned by the Admiralty for service in the Mediterranean
ML Norris Castle (I)	1938–1939	Requisitioned by the Admiralty for service in the Mediterranean

== Hythe Crossing Ferries ==
In 2023, the Hythe Ferry was acquired by Red Funnel, previous ferries to have operated on the service include:

- MV Hythe Hotspur ex Gosport Ferry, Southsea Queen bought in 1978 to operate cruises and act as a standby vessel for the ferry.
- MV New Forester introduced in 1982. She utilised the engines removed from Hotspur III.
- MV Solent Rose was borrowed from the Hurst Castle ferry service in 2013.
- MV Uriah Heep removed from service following a collision with the pier on 13 May 2016. As a result of the collision the Maritime and Coastguard Agency withdrew the vessel's passenger safety certificate and vessel was later sold.
- Hotspur IV was built in 1946 and served on the service until 2014. Hotspur IV was the last in a line of similar ferries. One of her earlier half-sisters, Hotspur II of 1936, saw further service as a ferry on the Firth of Clyde under the name Kenilworth.
