= Red Jet 2 =

Former Isle of Wight passenger catamaran ferry

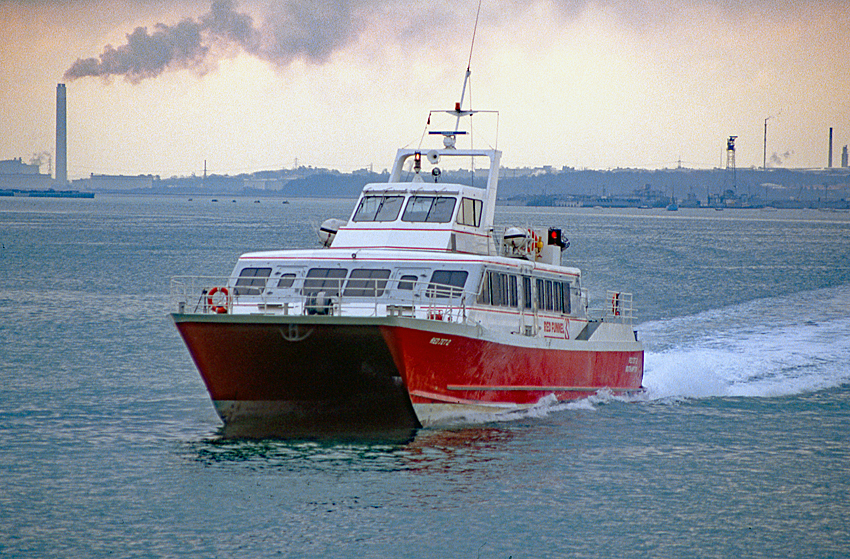
- Red Jet 2 approaching Town Quay from Cowes

History

United Kingdom
- Name: Red Jet 2 1991–2009; CM Jet 2 2009–2021; SA Jet 2 2018–present
- Operator: Red Funnel 1991–2009; Caspian Mainport 2009–present
- Builder: FB Marine
- Yard number: 1290
- Christened: 6 June 1991
- In service: 28 June 1991
- Identification: IMO number: 9001681
- Status: in service

General characteristics
- Type: High speed ferry
- Tonnage: 168 GT
- Length: 32.5 m (106 ft 8 in)
- Beam: 8.32 m (27 ft 4 in)
- Draught: 1.25 m (4 ft 1 in)
- Installed power: 2 x MTU 12V 396 Series TE 84
- Propulsion: 2 MJP waterjets
- Speed: 38 knots (70 km/h; 44 mph)
- Capacity: 138
- Crew: Max 6

Red Jet 2 was a high speed catamaran passenger ferry operated by Red Funnel between Southampton and Cowes on the Isle of Wight. She was built by FB Marine in 1991. She is identical to her sister ship, Red Jet 1.

== Specification ==
Red Jet 2 is 32.5 m (106.6 ft) long, with a beam of 8.32 m (27.3 ft). Powered by 2 MTU 1,360 kW (1,820 hp) 12V 396 Series TE 84 diesel engines, each driving a Marine Jet Power waterjet, she could complete the crossing between the two terminals in 22 minutes, cruising at 32.5 kn (60.2 km/h; 37.4 mph). Originally designed to carry 120 passengers, this was increased to 130 in 1993 and to 138 in 1998.

== History ==
She was christened by Lady Mottistone on 6 June 1991, subsequently entering service on 28 June. Her introduction was speeded up in order to compete with the rival Cowes Express service. Her arrival led to the withdrawal of the hydrofoil ferry Shearwater 4.

In 2009, she was withdrawn from service and, along with her sister craft, Red Jet 1, sold to Caspian Mainport for service in the Caspian Sea. The two craft left Southampton on the La Rochelle bound for Saint Petersburg on 14 May. She was renamed CM Jet 2 and used on Caspian's ferry routes. in 2021 she was repurposed for use as a tender and renamed SA Jet 2.

== See also ==
- Red Jet 1
- Red Jet 3
- Red Jet 4
- Red Jet 5
- Red Jet 6
- Red Jet 7
