= Red Jet 3 =

Former Isle of Wight passenger catamaran ferry

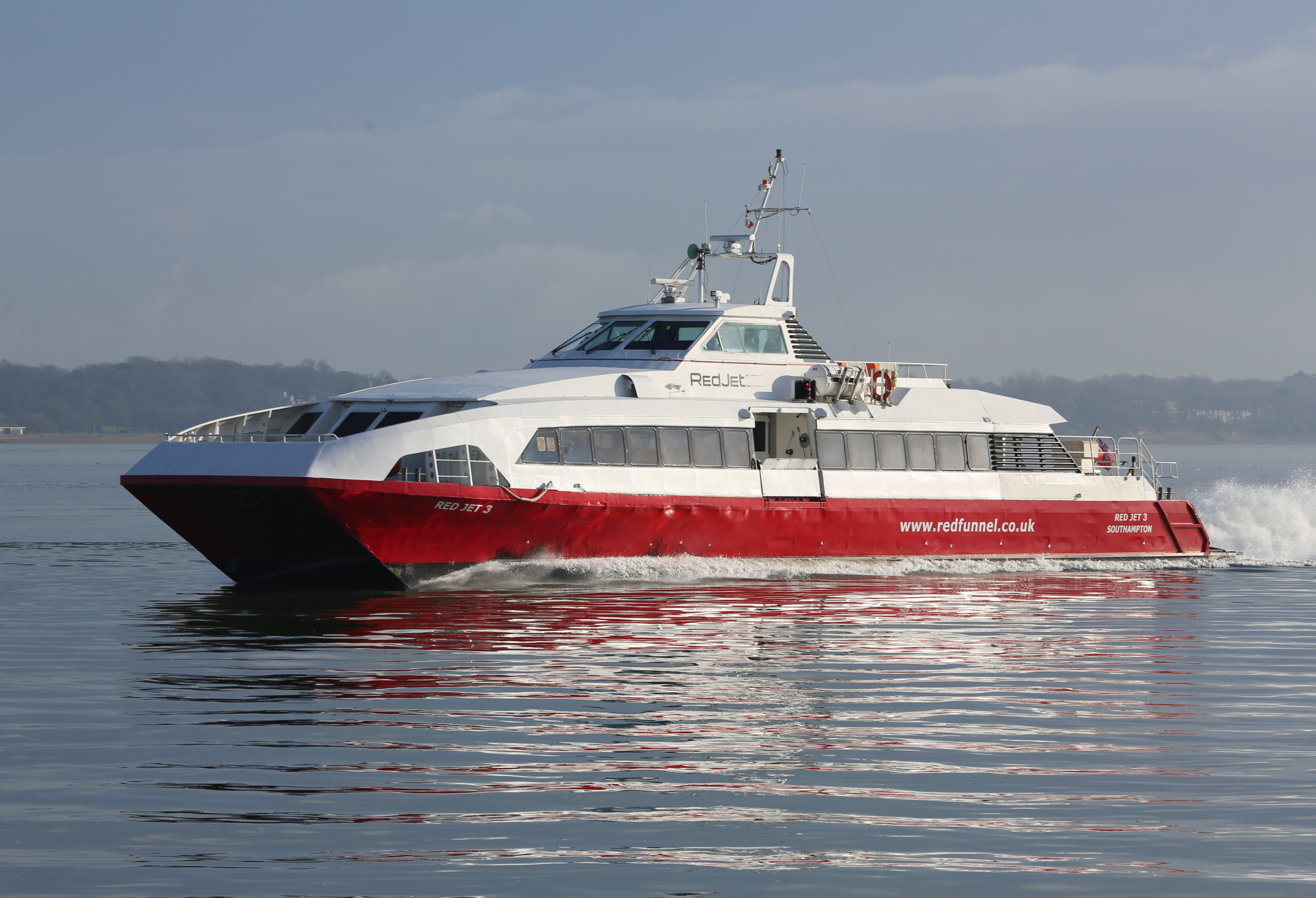
- Red Jet 3 on Southampton Water

History

United Kingdom
- Name: MV Red Jet 3
- Operator: Red Funnel
- Builder: FB Marine
- Laid down: 1998
- Launched: 16 June 1998
- In service: 27 July 1998
- Identification: IMO number: 9182758
- Status: Sold

General characteristics
- Class & type: Solent Class Catamaran
- Tonnage: 213 GT
- Length: 32.9 m (107 ft 11 in)
- Beam: 8.32 m (27 ft 4 in)
- Draught: 1.25 m (4 ft 1 in)
- Propulsion: 2 x MTU 12V 396 Series TE 74L 4 waterjets
- Speed: 38 knots (70 km/h; 44 mph)
- Capacity: 190
- Crew: Max 6

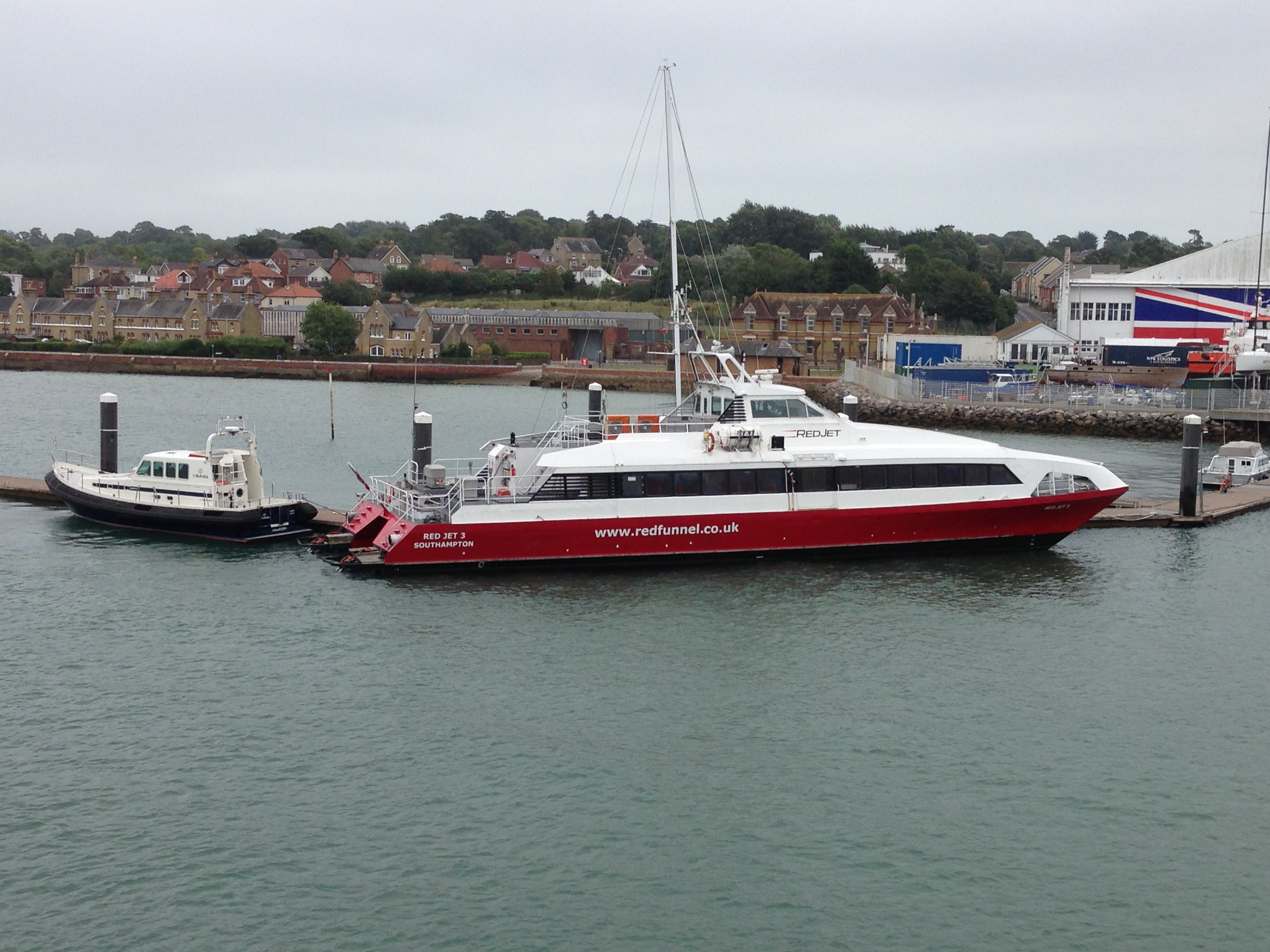
Red Jet 3 docked at the Columbine hangar in East Cowes, 19 August 2018

MV Red Jet 3 is a passenger catamaran ferry formerly operated by Red Funnel on their route from Southampton to Cowes on the Isle of Wight along with sister ships Red Jet 4, Red Jet 5 and Red Jet 6. She was built by FB Marine on the Isle of Wight, United Kingdom at a cost of £2.73 million and entered service in 1998. The ship reached a speed of 37.4 knots (69.3 km/h; 43.0 mph) during a publicity cruise on 14 July 1998 before entering into regular service on 27 July 1998. This entry into service meant that the older Shearwater 5 and Shearwater 6 hydrofoils were no longer needed to provide backup for the Red Funnel high speed service and they were withdrawn. The high speed fleet then consisted of Red Jet 1, Red Jet 2 and Red Jet 3.

In March 2019, Red Jet 3 was sold to Adriatic Fast Ferries, a ferry company operating in Split, Croatia. Red Jet 3 entered service with Adriatic later in the year, where it now operates under the name Adriatic Express.

== See also ==
- Red Jet 1
- Red Jet 2
- Red Jet 4
- Red Jet 5
- Red Jet 6
- Red Jet 7
