= Schiopparello Jet =

Former Isle of Wight passenger catamaran ferry

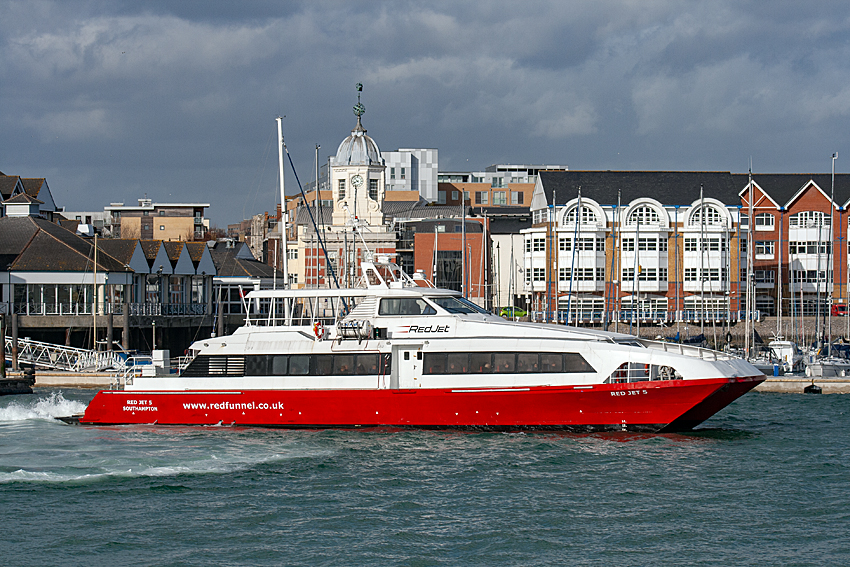
- Red Jet 5 departing Southampton

History
- Name: 1999-2008: MV Bo Hengy; 2009-2016 MV Red Jet 5; 2016 onwards: MV Schiopparello Jet
- Operator: 1999-2008: Bahamas Ferries; 2009-2016: Red Funnel; 2016 onwards: Toremar
- Builder: Pequot River Shipworks, New London, USA
- Laid down: 1999
- Identification: IMO number: 8954415
- Status: In service

General characteristics
- Class & type: Solent Class catamaran
- Tonnage: 209 GT
- Length: 32.9 m (107.9 ft)
- Beam: 8.32 m (27.3 ft)
- Draught: 1.25 m (4.1 ft)
- Propulsion: 2 x MTU/DDC 4000 Series 4
- Speed: 38 knots (70 km/h; 44 mph)
- Capacity: 187
- Crew: Max 3

MV Schiopparello Jet is a passenger catamaran ferry, formerly known as Bo Hengy and Red Jet 5. She operates on routes from Piombino to the Tuscan archipelago on behalf of ferry operator Toremar (Toscana Regionale Marittima). She was built in 1999.

Schiopparello Jet is a sister ship to Red Jet 3, a catamaran designed and built by FBM Marine on the Isle of Wight for operation by Red Funnel. However, unlike her sister ship, she was built in the United States. She is distinguished from her sister by having a sheltered sundeck.

== History ==
=== Bo Hengy ===
Built as the Bo Hengy for Bahamas Ferries, the vessel was constructed at the Pequot River Shipworks in New London, Connecticut in 1999. She was retired in 2008. Bahamas Ferries now operates a larger catamaran called Bo Hengy II.

=== Red Jet 5 ===
Following purchase by Red Funnel the vessel was transported to Southampton by heavy lift ship arriving 11 June 2009. The vessel was then towed to Portchester to be refurbished with an internal layout based on Red Jet 4. The work was carried out by Testbank along with Coastal and Burgess Marine.

The ship was officially named Red Jet 5 by Shirley Robertson on 21 July 2009, entering service about a week later as a replacement for Red Jet 1 and Red Jet 2, working alongside her sister ship Red Jet 3 and half-sister Red Jet 4. During the 2012 Summer Olympics in London, Red Jet 5 was chartered to Thames Clippers for use as a games shuttle on the Thames.

In 2015, Red Funnel announced that she would be replaced by a new ship, Red Jet 6, to be constructed at East Cowes. Once the latter was brought into service in summer 2016, Red Jet 5 was retired and sold.

=== Schiopparello Jet ===
The vessel was sold to Toremar and renamed Schiopparello Jet. She is used on services from Piombino, on the Tuscan mainland, to Portoferraio, on the island of Elba. Services operate via Cavo, also on the island of Elba.
