= MV Norris Castle =

MV Norris Castle is the name of the following ships, named for Norris Castle:

- MV Norris Castle (1942)
- MV Norris Castle (1968)
