= Red Falcon =

Red Falcon may refer to:

- MV Red Falcon, a vehicle and passenger ferry in England
- Red Falcons, a group of socialist children's organizations
- Red-footed falcon, a bird of prey
- Red Falcon (Contra), a recurring antagonist in Konami's Contra video game series.
