= MV Red Eagle (1996) =

Isle of Wight car and passenger ferry

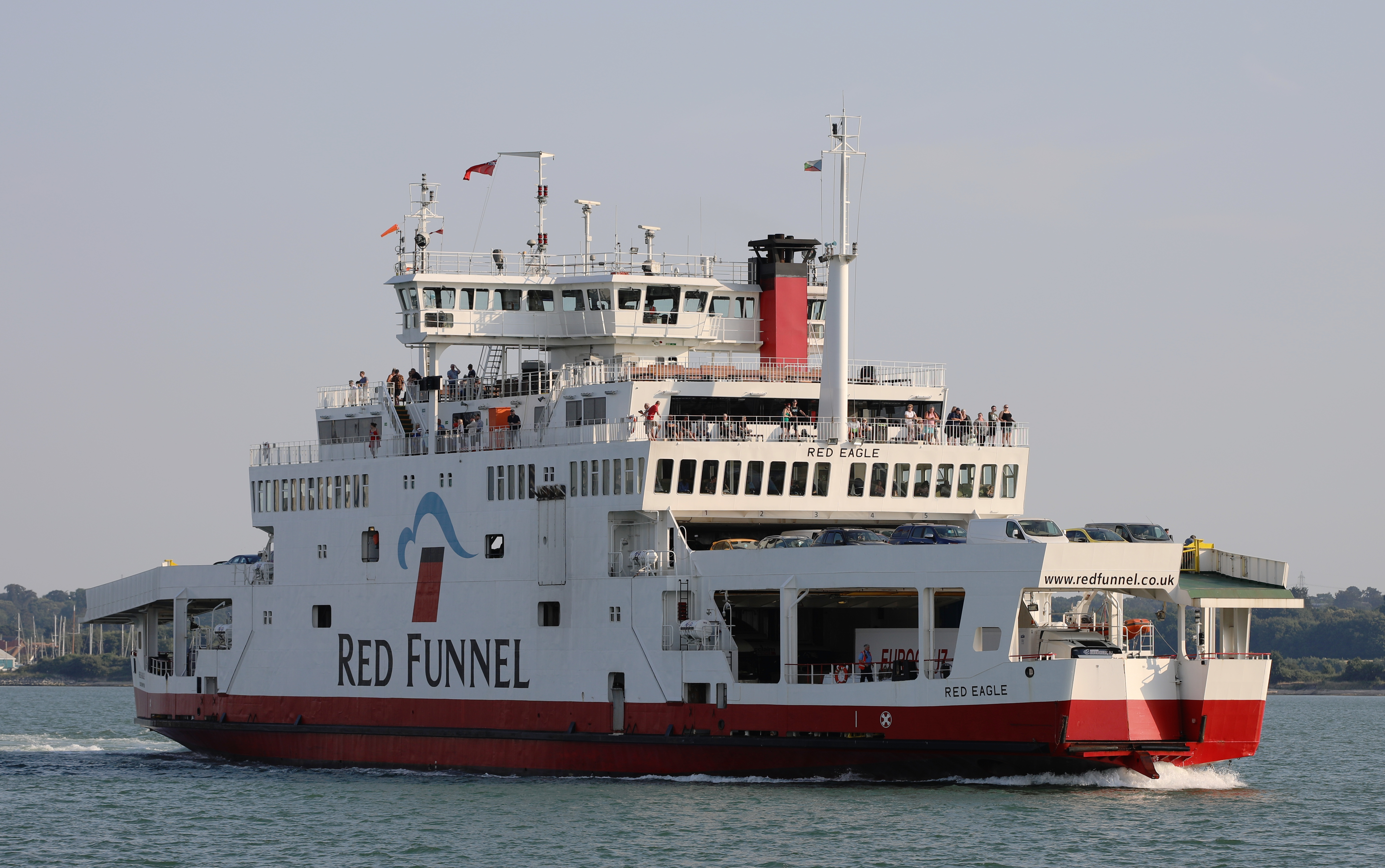

History

United Kingdom
- Name: Red Eagle
- Operator: Red Funnel
- Route: Southampton (England) – East Cowes (Isle of Wight)
- Builder: Ferguson Shipbuilders
- Launched: 23 November 1995
- In service: 1996 – Sept 2004, Jan 2005 – present
- Identification: IMO number: 9117337
- Status: In service

General characteristics
- Class & type: Raptor-class car passenger ferry
- Tonnage: 4,075 GT
- Length: 93.22 m (305.8 ft)
- Beam: 17.5 m (57.4 ft)
- Decks: 5, including 3 vehicle decks
- Speed: 14 kn (25.9 km/h)
- Capacity: 894 passengers, 220 cars

Red Eagle is a Raptor-class vehicle and passenger ferry operated by Red Funnel on its route from Southampton to East Cowes on the Isle of Wight. The largest of its class, Red Eagle is the current flagship for Red Funnel.

== History ==
She entered service in 1996, the latest car ferry to enter service after Red Falcon and Red Osprey in 1994. Between October and December 2004 she underwent modifications by Remontowa in Gdańsk, Poland, in order to increase vehicle capacity by 80 and allow a greater passenger capacity. This involved the lengthening of the ship by 9.6 m (31 ft). She was the last of Red Funnel's Raptor-class ships to undergo the process. When she re-entered service in January 2005, she became the largest vessel regularly crossing the Solent, taking this title from her sister, Red Osprey. Prior to beginning her 2018 sailing season, Red Eagle underwent a refit at Southampton Marine Services that refurbished and expanded her interior spaces. Fabrication work for the new extensions was by Wight Shipyard.

== Events ==
On 11 November 2008 she was used on an excursion to view Queen Elizabeth 2 leaving Southampton for the final time.

On 27 September 2018 it was reported that the vessel had cut three yachts adrift from their moorings during thick fog. A catamaran and a channel marker were struck during the incident in Cowes Harbour, after which two yachts were found drifting outside the harbour.

On 23 July 2025 Red Eagle suffered a main engine failure and had to be brought to Southampton by tug.

== Appearances in media ==
She featured in an episode of Top Gear in 2002, as part of a review of an Aston Martin. She is featured in the video game series Ship Simulator, along with one of her running mates, Red Jet 4, as a sailable ship.
