= Linkspan =

Type of drawbridge used for moving vehicles on and off a ferry

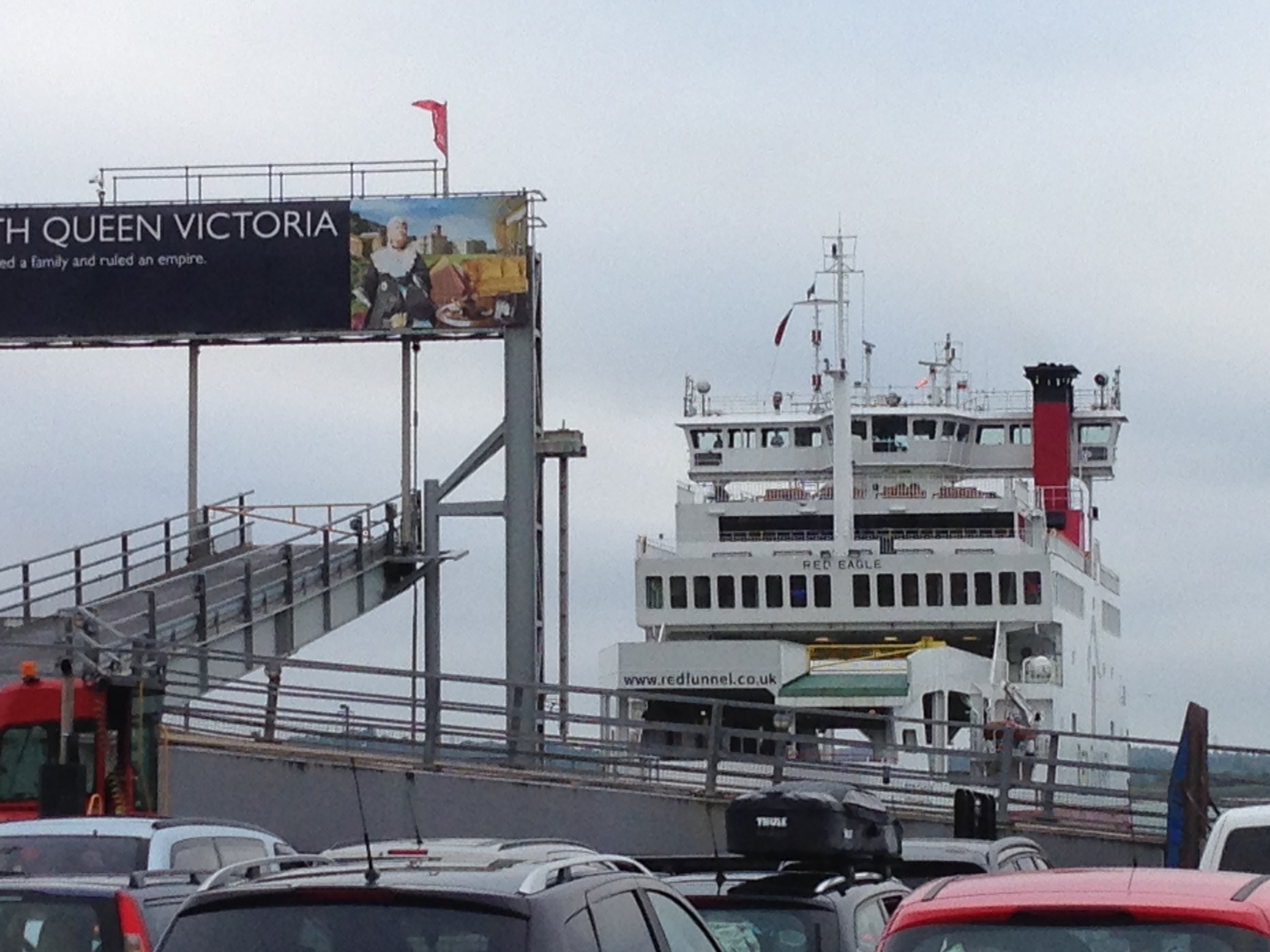
MV Red Eagle arrives at the Red Funnel terminal's linkspan in Southampton in preparation for its first service of the day.

A linkspan or link-span is a type of drawbridge used mainly in the operation of moving vehicles on and off a roll-on/roll-off (RO-RO) vessel or ferry, particularly to allow for tidal changes in water level.

Linkspans are usually found at ferry terminals where a vessel uses a combination of ramps either at the stern, bow or side to load or unload cars, vans, trucks and buses onto the shore, or alternately at the stern and/or the bow to load or unload railroad cars.

== History ==
The first linkspans appeared at the end of the 19th century when train ferries came into operation. Each rail ferry berth has to be specifically designed to make sure that it fitted one class of ship. In most of these vessels it was also possible to carry some road vehicles.

By the mid 20th century with the rise of road transport, general purpose Ro Ro ferries started to come into service. Most could use the rail ferry berths but generally they were fitted with stern ramps that had the dual function of giving a watertight closure to the ship's stern access door and also acting as a drawbridge to the quay which allowed vehicles to drive on and off the vessel. Using the ramp for access has limitations in that if there is any significant tidal range; gradients on this ramp become too steep to be manageable. The operation of these vessels was initially limited to areas such as the Baltic and Mediterranean seas. Very soon there was a demand for these ferries to be used in tidal waters. Ship's ramps were also developed in size, as was forward access through a bow door closed by a drawbridge ramp inside a visor. These features are now common to most Ro Ro drive through ships.

== Operation ==
Initially a linkspan was a ramp that was attached to the pier at one end and was suspended above the water at the other. The height above the water was controlled either by hydraulic rams or cables, these types of linkspans were less well designed for the various conditions of the tide, wave and current and so were superseded by underwater tank linkspans that through compressed air can be adjusted for ferry ramp height and often need no adjustment for tidal height. The aim of all this is to have the linkspan at roughly the same height above the water as that of the car deck on whichever ferry happens to be docking at the time. All that is then needed is for a ramp (usually on the vessel) to be lowered, bridging the gap between the ferry and the linkspan.

In ports such as Dover a Marine Development "double deck" linkspan can be found where two decks of a large ferry can be loaded simultaneously.

Linkspans can also be used for passenger walkways.

== Variants ==
=== Train ferry ===
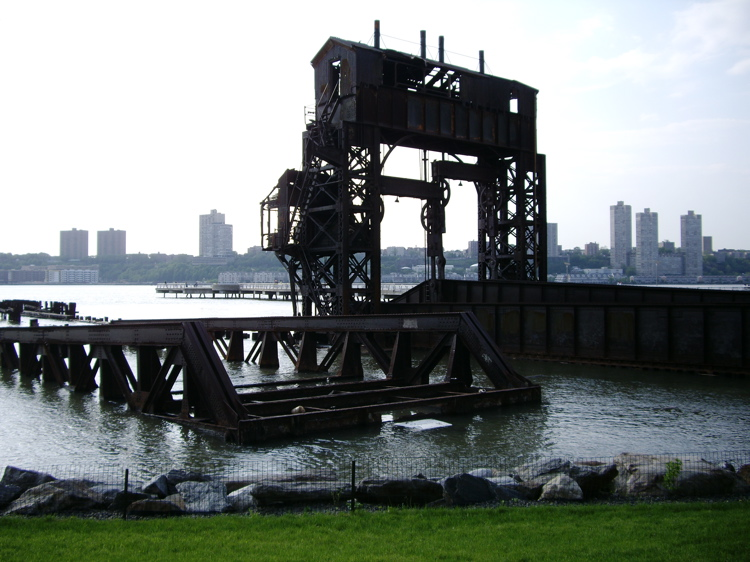
Derelict rail linkspan in New York

To ensure that the rail tracks on the train ferry or car float and the linkspan align precisely it is necessary for the ship to have a ledge at its stern onto which the linkspan is rested. To be certain that the rail tracks do not have a step at the junction of ship and linkspan, this ledge or shelf must be of a depth the same as that of the end of the linkspan. It is also fitted with a locating pin that ensures the linkspan is in the exact athwart ships (sideways) position.

To protect the linkspan from impact as the ship makes its final approach, stern fenders are positioned in front of it. These absorb the energy of the ferry's impact, guide its stern and hold it from moving sideways when finally berthed. These guide fenders also prevent excessive loads being transferred to the locating pin.

As the trains roll onto or off the ship its freeboard and trim will change significantly. The linkspan moving with the ship provides acceptable gradients which for railway traffic should not exceed 1:25 (4%). This relatively shallow gradient limited the areas where train ferries could operate. Where the tide is only 2 meters (6.56 ft) for example the linkspan must have a length of at least 50 meters (164 ft). For any greater tide, the linkspan must be very long; other problems also arise which can be very costly to solve.

Rail linkspans are generally supported at their outer end by counterweights. This means that when the linkspan is lowered onto the ship's ledge only a small proportion of its weight rests there. However half of the weight of the train on the linkspan is transferred to the ledge. When it becomes necessary to make longer linkspans to accommodate a greater tide range the train loads become proportionately higher until a critical reaction is reached. Before this point is reached, it is usual to create a second span with this inner span being adjusted at its outer end, where it is hinged to the outer span. Rail ferries must not only have the correct rail alignment, but their stern configuration and beam must be an exact fit for the berth it is to use.

=== General purpose ===
Those linkspans designed originally for train ferries were therefore very restricting for the new general-purpose ferries. Dover, which was one of the earliest tidal rail ferry ports, continued to adopt the “precise fit” approach so that road vehicular ferries had to have the exact beam to fit a berth. Their bow and stern configuration also had to conform to fit with the guide fenders to allow the vessel to “nest” into them. At the bow it was necessary to fit a “moustache” which is a steel structure projecting from the stem. Such ships have neither a support ledge nor drawbridge ramps: the link across the gap between ship and linkspan is bridged by flaps about 2–2.5 m (6.6–8.2 ft) long. When stowed these flaps stow vertically to the end of the linkspan and in so doing prevent a ramped vessel lowering its ramp. Most of the other tidal rail-ferry ports initially adopted this arrangement in the English Channel, North Sea and Irish Sea routes but have now moved away to the more flexible arrangement described below. Dover/Calais route, one of the busiest in the world, still require that vessels using these ports are configured to suit the restraints of each berth, in doing so this limits them from being used in service elsewhere.

=== Submerged tank ===
In the early 1970s Marine Development a specialist design company patented a new type of linkspan for use with general purpose ferries. It was able to slew laterally at its outer end and so line up the centreline of the ship with the linkspan. Vessels were no longer limited by their beam in using the berth. The linkspan was designed to take berthing impact of ships through its hinge. This allowed the outer end to be free of guide or stop fenders making it possible for the ship's ramp to be lowered free from their obstruction. The outer end of this type of linkspan is supported by a submerged tank connected to the bridge deck of the linkspan by buoyant legs. This submerged tank acts as a counterweight so that when the linkspan is lowered onto the ship's ledge it creates a small reaction but moves freely following the ship's movements. Such a design proved particularly efficient with small ferries in exposed berths, it being able to cope with vertical movements at the end of the ship (as much as two meters) while still being able to load or discharge vehicles.

The main limitation with this design is that if the ship had no support ledge it must be attached to the ship by some other method. Wire pendants hanging from the vessel are the main method used but although these required the addition of two brackets on the ship this is a minor modification. For occasional or single voyage visits, synthetic strops are provided and secured through the fairleads onto the ships’ bitts. An alternative to the ledge using a central hook on the linkspan to a bar on the vessel is also adopted. All these alternatives must ensure that the loads are shared by both the support pendants.

Initially when ships’ ramps were no more than 8m wide (double lane) there were very few vessels that could not use a berth that had the submerged tank linkspan . Even non-ramped ferries from the rail ferry routes could berth using flaps on the outer end of the linkspan that stowed flush with the deck. Ports such as Ostend, Boulogne, and Rosslare as a result were able to accept a variety of vessels in berths for the first time.

Around fifty of this type of linkspan have been built. The design allowed flexibility for ship-owners and ports during the changeover from the old very restricting system. With the development of wider ship's ramps (up to 28 m or 92 ft), triple lane lower deck and two lane upper-deck accesses to vessels, the submerged tank type has been superseded. It still holds its own for train ferries that have ledge support. The newest installation of this type is in Poti, (Georgia) where a five track submerged tank linkspan provides a vital rail link between Azerbaijan and Georgia across the Black Sea to Europe as part of an EU Tacis project. It continues to be used also in small dedicated ferry berths often operating to berths without sheltered ports. The saving of deadweight by not carrying ships’ ramps and the ability to follow the ship's short period movements due to waves, rapid trim and draft change during loading and discharge ensure the continuation of this design. Two recently (2007) were installed in the West of Scotland on a short estuarial crossing, and two more on a new route across the Spencer Gulf in Southern Australia.

=== Traditional ===
The original rail linkspans were also developed for general purpose ferries with greater flexibility than the Dover/Calais route. The outer end became supported in two ways.

1. By a counterweighted system with winches to raise, lower and hold the traffic load. In some cases the winch arrangement is only strong enough to overcome the counterweight imbalance. After positioning at the correct level for the ship, the outer end is then pinned to the adjacent structure through which the traffic loads are transferred.
2. By winches and wires, hydraulic cylinders and lift and lock climbing mechanisms. In each of these cases the weight of the linkspan's outer end keeps them always under load even when not in use. The load is further increased when the traffic passes over them.

At the outer end, to support these lifting systems, it is necessary to construct civil works of sufficient capacity to take the vertical loads transferred to it through the support systems described above. These works also provide the support for stop fenders that prevent the berthing vessel from impacting the linkspan. As soon as the vessel is moored it may lower its ramp onto the outer end of the linkspan to bridge the gap. This ramp hinged at the ship's threshold then accommodates any movement due to waves, swell and the passage of traffic.

The stop fenders need to be far enough apart to allow the ship's ramp to fit between them, and this must also allow for the variation of beam of the vessels using the berth as well as an eccentricity of the ramp. If they are too far apart then they are only effective protection for the widest ships with square sterns. This limitation means that ship's with rounded or tapered sterns and those berthing bow in are likely to hit the end of the linkspan with consequential damage. Later developments allow for the berthing energy to be absorbed through the linkspan at the hinge but this will not protect from overriding of the ship or uplift from the bulbous bow. Impact loads delivered this way can apply greater forces on the support mechanism than traffic loads with sometimes disastrous consequences.

== See also ==
- Breakover angle – Aspect of wheeled vehicle chassis design
- Car float – Unpowered barge with railroad tracks mounted on its deck
- Dover–Dunkerque train ferry – Train ferry that operated between the United Kingdom and Europe
- Drawbridge – Type of moveable bridge
- Ferry slip – Docking facility for a ferry
- Gangway (nautical) – Narrow walkway platform giving access to a ship or between quarterdeck and forecastle
- Gantry crane – Type of overhead crane used in industrial environments
- Marine Development – Scottish linkspan development company - linkspan designer
- Movable bridges – Bridge that moves to allow passage, usually of watercraft for a list of other movable bridge types
- New York Central Railroad 69th Street Transfer Bridge – Historic dock in Manhattan, New York
