= PS Gracie Fields =

Paddle steamer built in 1936

History

United Kingdom
- Namesake: Gracie Fields
- Owner: The Southampton, Isle of Wight and South of England Royal Mail Steam Packet Company Limited (Red Funnel)
- Port of registry: Southampton
- Builder: John I Thornycroft & Co, Woolston
- Yard number: 1149
- Launched: 8 April 1936
- Completed: May 1936
- Homeport: Southampton
- Identification: Official number: 165053; Pennant number: J100
- Fate: Sunk by air attack 30 May 1940
- Notes: Requisitioned by Admiralty in 1939, used as minesweeper off Dover

General characteristics
- Type: Paddle steamer
- Tonnage: 396 GRT
- Length: 195 ft 11 in (59.72 m)
- Beam: 24 ft 11 in (7.59 m)
- Propulsion: Compound diagonal steam engine
- Speed: 17 knots (31 km/h; 20 mph)

PS Gracie Fields built in 1936, was the last paddle steamer built for Red Funnel as a ferry and excursion steamer. She ran on the Southampton-Cowes route until the outbreak of World War II, when she was requisitioned and served as HMS Gracie Fields as a minesweeper. After successfully evacuating troops from the Dunkirk beaches, she was seriously damaged by an aircraft bomb on 29 May 1940, and sank the following morning.

== Design and construction ==
Laid down as Yard No.1149 by John I. Thornycroft & Company at Woolston for The Southampton, Isle of Wight and South of England Royal Mail Steam Packet Company Limited, known as Red Funnel, the paddle steamer Gracie Fields had a tonnage of 396 GRT. Her length overall was 195 ft 11 in (59.72 m), breadth 24 ft 11 in (7.59 m) and depth 8 ft 0 in (2.44 m). The ship was propelled by a diagonal compound steam engine of 137 nhp, also made by Thornycroft and giving a service speed of 14 knots (26 km/h; 16 mph). To increase manoeuvrability when going astern, she was fitted with a bow rudder. Accommodation for cars was provided on the fore deck.

== Operation ==
She was launched by her namesake, the singer Gracie Fields, on 8 April 1936. After a cruise for invited guests on 9 May, she entered revenue service the following day. During the rest of 1936, she undertook a couple of special cruises in conjunction with her sponsor.

== Royal Navy service ==
At the beginning of the Second World War she was requisitioned by the Admiralty and served as a minesweeper. On 29 May 1940, the ship took part in the Dunkirk evacuation, rescuing 280 troops on the first trip. However, on the second trip, with 750 men on board, she was attacked by German aircraft resulting in the loss of eight on board, the survivors having been picked up by warships. HMS Pangbourne attempted to tow the damaged vessel back to England but Gracie Fields sank in the night.
