= Marine Development =

Scottish linkspan development company

Marine Development (Glasgow) Ltd., established in Scotland in 1972, developed the linkspan for over 30 years. They pioneered integral tank, submerged tank, and mobile linkspans under the direction of John Rose. These semi-buoyant ship-to-shore bridges minimise engineering infrastructure requirements and were originally designed a cheap and simple means of using ro-ro ferries in the Western Isles of Scotland, but later found wider applications.

They no longer trade but their expertise was acquired in 2007 by TTS Marine, who are developing the design of tank linkspan further.
