= PS Victoria =

History
- Name: PS Victoria
- Operator: 1881–1899: London and South Western Railway and London, Brighton and South Coast Railway; 1899–1900: Isle of Wight and South of England Royal Mail Steam Packet Company, (Red Funnel)
- Port of registry: (United Kingdom)
- Builder: Aitken and Mansel, Whiteinch
- Yard number: 113
- Launched: 9 September 1881
- Out of service: September 1900
- Fate: Scrapped 1900

General characteristics
- Tonnage: 366 gross register tons (GRT)
- Length: 191.9 feet (58.5 m)
- Beam: 25.1 feet (7.7 m)
- Depth: 8.6 feet (2.6 m)

PS Victoria was a passenger vessel built for the London and South Western Railway and London, Brighton and South Coast Railway in 1881.

== History ==
The ship was built in steel by Aitken and Mansel and launched on 9 September 1881. Her engines were by David Rowan of Glasgow. She was the first ship constructed for a joint venture between the London and South Western Railway and the London, Brighton and South Coast Railway for the passenger trade to the Isle of Wight. She was double-ended, with two funnels.

Official registries show that in 1899 she transferred to the Isle of Wight and South of England Royal Mail Steam Packet Company and was scrapped in 1900. However, there is no mention of her ever being purchased or chartered in the company records.
