= Toremar =

Toremar S.p.A.
- Industry: Passenger transportation
- Founded: 1975
- Headquarters: Livorno, Tuscany, Italy
- Area served: Tyrrhenian Sea
- Parent: Moby Lines
- Website: www.toremar.it

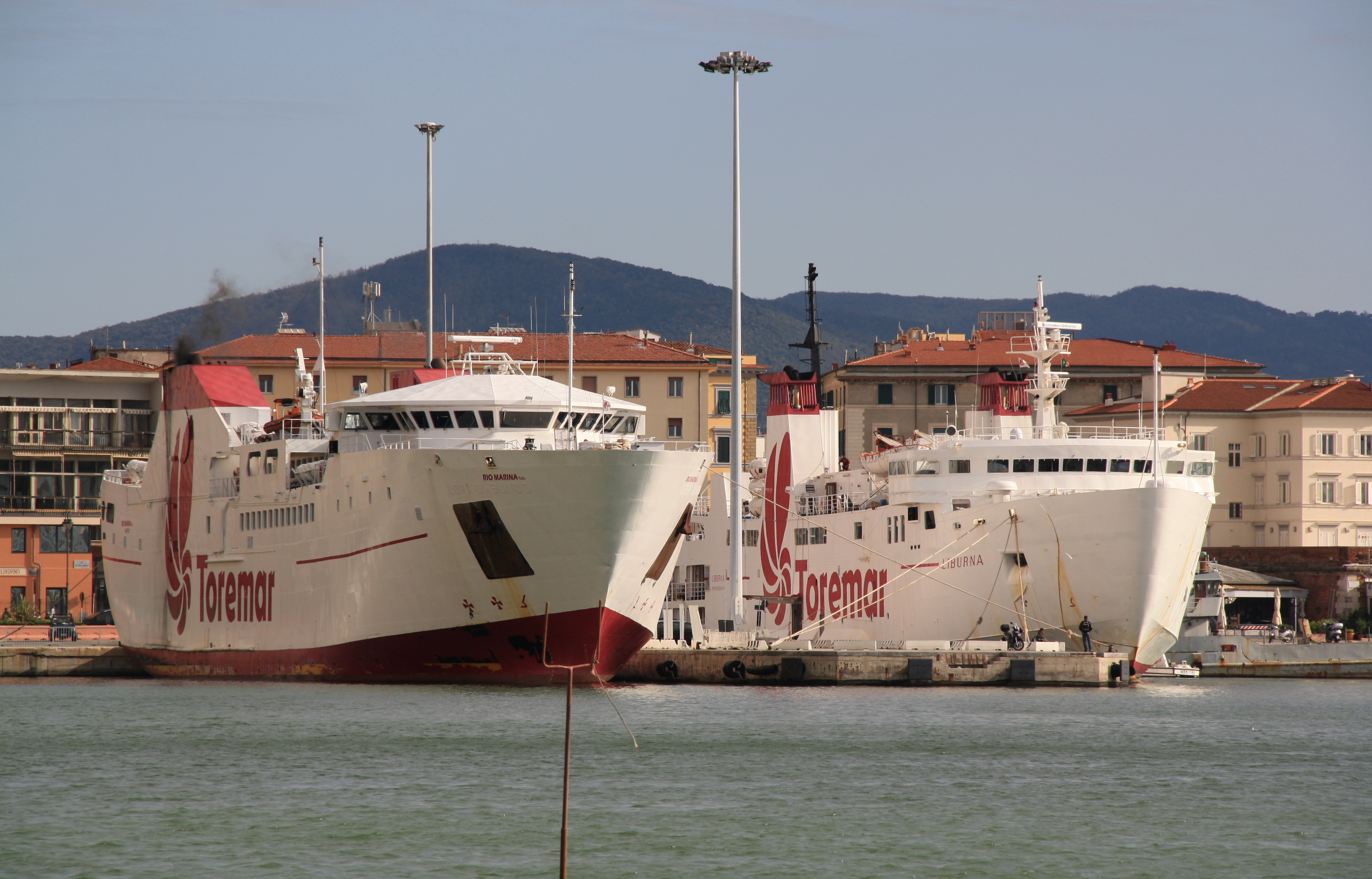
Rio Marina Bella and Liburna in Livorno

Toremar (Toscana Regionale Marittima) is an Italian shipping company which operates in routes from Tuscany to the Tuscan archipelago.

On 3 November 2009 the Transport Minister Altero Matteoli and the President of the Tuscany Region signed an agreement for the passage of the shipping company from the state to the region of Tuscany.

== Fleet ==
Name	Tonnage	Passengers	Car capacity / l.m.	Speed Knots	Type
Stelio Montomoli	2,780	710	100	18	Ferry
Marmorica	2,386	470	106	18	Ferry
Oglasa	2,386	470	106	18	Ferry
Giovanni Bellini	1,573	550 / 700	62	16.5	Ferry
Rio Marina Bella	2.392	900	120	18	Ferry
Giuseppe Rum	497	633	40	16	Ferry
Schiopparello Jet	209	187	-	38	Fast Ferry

== Routes ==
- Livorno↔Gorgona
- Livorno↔Capraia
- Piombino↔Portoferraio
- Piombino↔Cavo
- Piombino↔Rio Marina
- Porto Santo Stefano↔Isola del Giglio
