= Red Kestrel =

Isle of Wight freight ferry

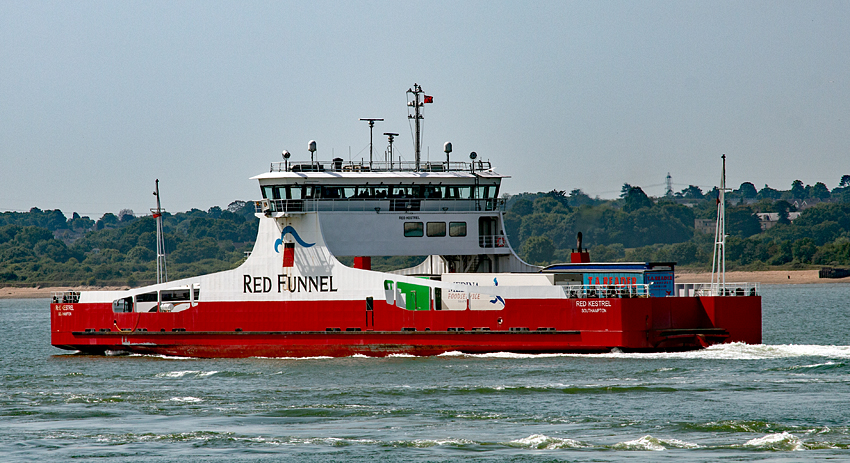
- Red Kestrel ferry heading down Southampton Water

History

United Kingdom
- Name: Red Kestrel
- Operator: Red Funnel
- Route: Southampton - East Cowes
- Builder: Cammell Laird
- Laid down: 31 May 2018
- Launched: 19 February 2019
- In service: 24 May 2019
- Identification: IMO number: 9847645; MMSI number: 232019192; Callsign: MEGW6
- Status: Active

General characteristics
- Class & type: Freight Ferry
- Tonnage: 1,070 GT
- Length: 74.25 m (243.6 ft)
- Beam: 17 m (55.8 ft)
- Installed power: 2 x Cummins QSK38 Tier III diesel engines (2 x 969kW)
- Propulsion: 2 x Rolls-Royce US 155FP azimuth thrusters
- Speed: 12.5 kn (23.2 km/h; 14.4 mph)
- Capacity: 12 passengers, 12 HGVs
- Crew: 6-7

Red Kestrel is a freight ferry built by Cammell Laird for Red Funnel for use on its Southampton to East Cowes service. She was launched on 19 February 2019 and entered service in May 2019.

== History ==
Red Funnel's £10 million order for the new ship was announced on 14 February 2018. The introduction and operation of Red Kestrel was intended to increase freight capacity on the busy Southampton to East Cowes route, while increasing space for passengers aboard the existing Raptor-class fleet with the predicted increase in HGVs exclusively being transported by Red Kestrel. The ferry provides 265 lane metres of roll-on/roll-off freight capacity and accommodation for up to 12 passengers.

The keel for MV Red Kestrel was laid down on 31 May 2018 at Cammell Laird in Birkenhead in a ceremony attended by 300 guests. She was floated out on 19 February 2019 and in April underwent sea trials on the River Mersey. The vessel departed the Mersey for Southampton on 11 April 2019, arriving on 18 April 2019.

The vessel was officially named in a ceremony on 25 April 2019, attended by Alok Sharma, Minister of State for Employment. She entered service in May 2019.
