= HMS Atherstone (1916) =

Minesweeper of the Royal Navy

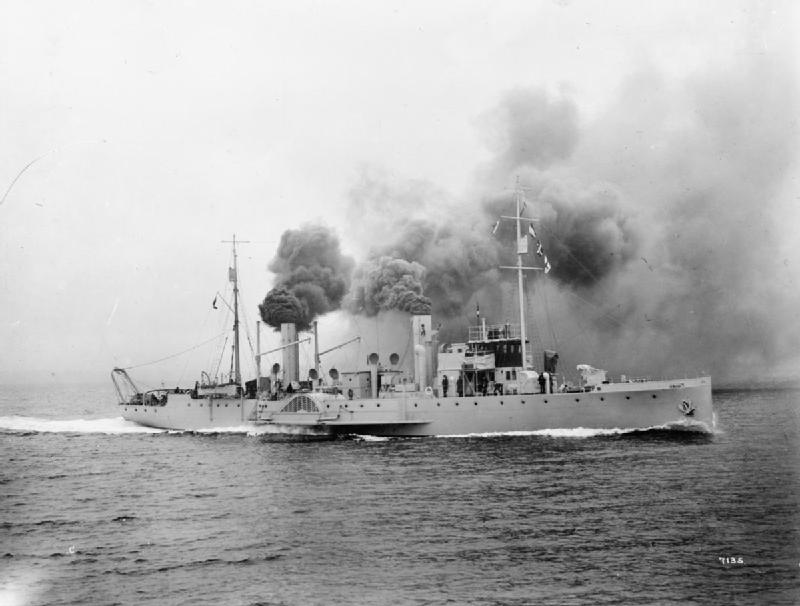
- HMS Atherstone

History

United Kingdom
- Name: HMS Atherstone
- Builder: Ailsa Shipbuilding Company
- Launched: 14 April 1916
- Fate: Sold into civilian service on 12 August 1927

United Kingdom
- Name: Queen of Kent
- Owner: New Medway Steam Packet Co.
- Acquired: 12 August 1927
- Fate: Requisitioned by Admiralty 1939

United Kingdom
- Name: HMS Queen of Kent
- Commissioned: 1939
- Decommissioned: 1946
- Fate: Released back to civilian service

United Kingdom
- Name: Queen of Kent (1946–1949); Lorna Doone (1949–1952)
- Owner: New Medway Steam Packet Co.; Red Funnel
- Fate: Scrapped in 1952

General characteristics
- Class & type: Racecourse-class minesweeper
- Displacement: 810 long tons (823 t)
- Length: 235 ft (72 m)
- Beam: 29 ft (8.8 m); 58 ft (18 m) at the paddles (both types)
- Draught: 6.75–7 ft (2.06–2.13 m)
- Propulsion: Inclined compound. Cylindrical return tube. 1,400 hp (1,000 kW).
- Speed: 15 knots (28 km/h; 17 mph)
- Range: 156 tons coal
- Complement: 50–52 men
- Armament: 2 × 12-pounder guns

HMS Atherstone was a Racecourse-class minesweeper of the Royal Navy. The Racecourse class comprised 32 paddlewheel coastal minesweeping sloops.

== History ==
=== Great War ===
Built by Ailsa SB at Troon in Scotland, she was launched on 14 April 1916. For the rest of the war she served with the Auxiliary Patrol. Post war she was transferred to the Mine Clearance Service.

=== Between the wars ===
She was sold to The New Medway Steam Packet Company on 12 August 1927 and converted for excursion work on the Medway and Thames. She was renamed Queen of Kent. For the next twelve years she could be found working from Sheerness and Southend. Regular excursions took her to Gravesend, Margate, Clacton and Dover as well as cross-channel voyages to Calais, Boulogne and Dunkirk.

=== World War II ===
In September 1939 she was requisitioned by the Admiralty for minesweeping duties once more and commissioned as HMS Queen of Kent, pennant number J74. For Operation Overlord in June 1944 she was stationed at Peel Bank off the Isle of Wight as the Mulberry Accommodation & Despatch Control Ship. Subsequently, she was stationed at Dungeness. In August 1944 she was converted to an anti-aircraft vessel and fitted with 9 20mm Oerlikon AA guns. In December 1944, she was deployed to Antwerp in Belgium to assist in the protection of the city and its vital docks from Luftwaffe bombing raids and V1 and V2 rockets. On 28 February 1945, whilst she was moored on the River Scheldt in Antwerp, a V2 rocket landed in the river and shrapnel ripped through the starboard side of the ship. Eleven members of the crew were killed and were buried in what is now the CWGC cemetery at Schooneshof, Wilrijk in Belgium. She was no longer in a fit operational state and returned to the United Kingdom for repair. After the war she was returned in 1946 to her owners to recommence excursion work around the Thames Estuary.

=== Post war ===
In January 1949 she was sold to Red Funnel and transferred to Southampton. After refitting at Thorneycroft's yard at Northam she was commissioned in the spring as the company's second Lorna Doone. For the next three years she operated excursions from Bournemouth in the summer. She was finally withdrawn and scrapped by Dover Industries Ltd at Dover Eastern Docks in 1952.
