= MV Norris Castle (1942) =

Former Isle of Wight car and passenger ferry

History
- Name: LCT 828; NSCL 1; Norris Castle; Nereis; Aghios Dionisios; Galina S
- Owner: Royal Navy; Red Funnel; Compania Maritima Santa Kynaki SA; D Filipopulous; National Shipping Company
- Port of registry: Southampton; Panama; San Lorenzo, Honduras
- Route: Southampton–Cowes/East Cowes
- Completed: 1942
- Acquired: 1947
- Maiden voyage: 23 July 1948
- Out of service: 1962
- Identification: IMO number: 5004831
- Fate: Sold to Greek owners

General characteristics
- Type: Car ferry
- Tonnage: 473 GT
- Length: 180 ft (55 m)
- Beam: 38 feet 1 inch (11.61 m)
- Installed power: Davy Paxman & Co diesel engine
- Propulsion: Twin screw
- Capacity: 250 passengers; 30 cars

MV Norris Castle was built, in 1942, by Alexander Finlay & Co in Glasgow. She was originally constructed as a tank landing craft, LCT 828, for the Normandy landings. She was 180 ft (55 m) long and had a capacity of 473 gross tons. Acquired in 1947 by Red Funnel, she made her first service voyage on 23 July 1948 and operated as a car ferry until sold in 1962. As she could load from both the front and side, she was used on the Southampton to East Cowes service. Norris Castle made her last sailing for Red Funnel on 16 March 1962.

After withdrawal from service in 1962, she was sold to Compania Maritima Santa Kynaki SA for further service in the Greek Islands. The same year ownership was passed to D Filipopulous and she was renamed Aghios Dionisios. In 2000, she was renamed Galina S by her new owners, the National Shipping Company, and registered in Honduras. She still appeared on Lloyds Register in 2008–09, though with no details of ownership or registration.
