= MV Red Falcon =

Isle of Wight car and passenger ferry

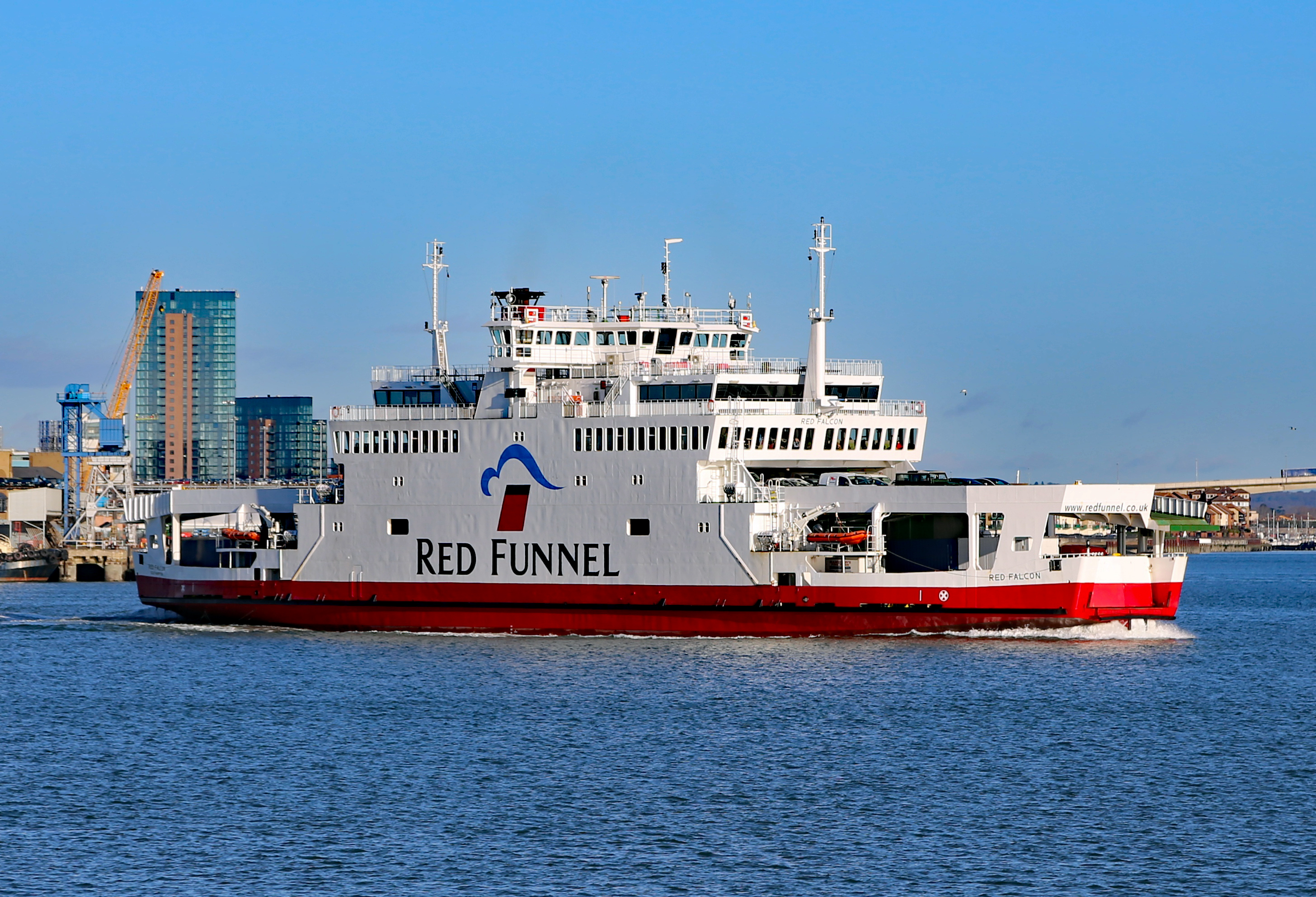

History

United Kingdom
- Name: Red Falcon
- Operator: Red Funnel
- Builder: Ferguson Shipbuilders
- Launched: 18 October 1993
- In service: April 1994 -
- Identification: IMO number: 9064047
- Status: Active

General characteristics
- Tonnage: 3,953 GT
- Length: 93.22 m (305.8 ft)
- Beam: 17.5 m (57.4 ft)
- Decks: 5, including 3 vehicle decks
- Propulsion: 2 x 8 cyl Stork Wartsila FHD 240, 3 x diesel generators, 2 x Voith Schneider Propulsion Units
- Speed: 14 knots (26 km/h; 16 mph)
- Capacity: 892 passengers, 220 cars
- Crew: 10-15

MV Red Falcon is a vehicle and passenger ferry operated by Red Funnel from Southampton to East Cowes on the Isle of Wight. It was built by Ferguson Shipbuilders in Port Glasgow.

Launched in 1993, she entered service in 1994, being bought new by Red Funnel along with sister ship Red Osprey and as such, has operated the same regular route throughout her life. Between January and March 2004 she underwent modifications by Remontowa in Gdańsk, Poland to increase vehicle capacity by 80 and allow a greater passenger capacity. This involved the lengthening of the ship by 9.6 m (31 ft).

== 2014 refit ==
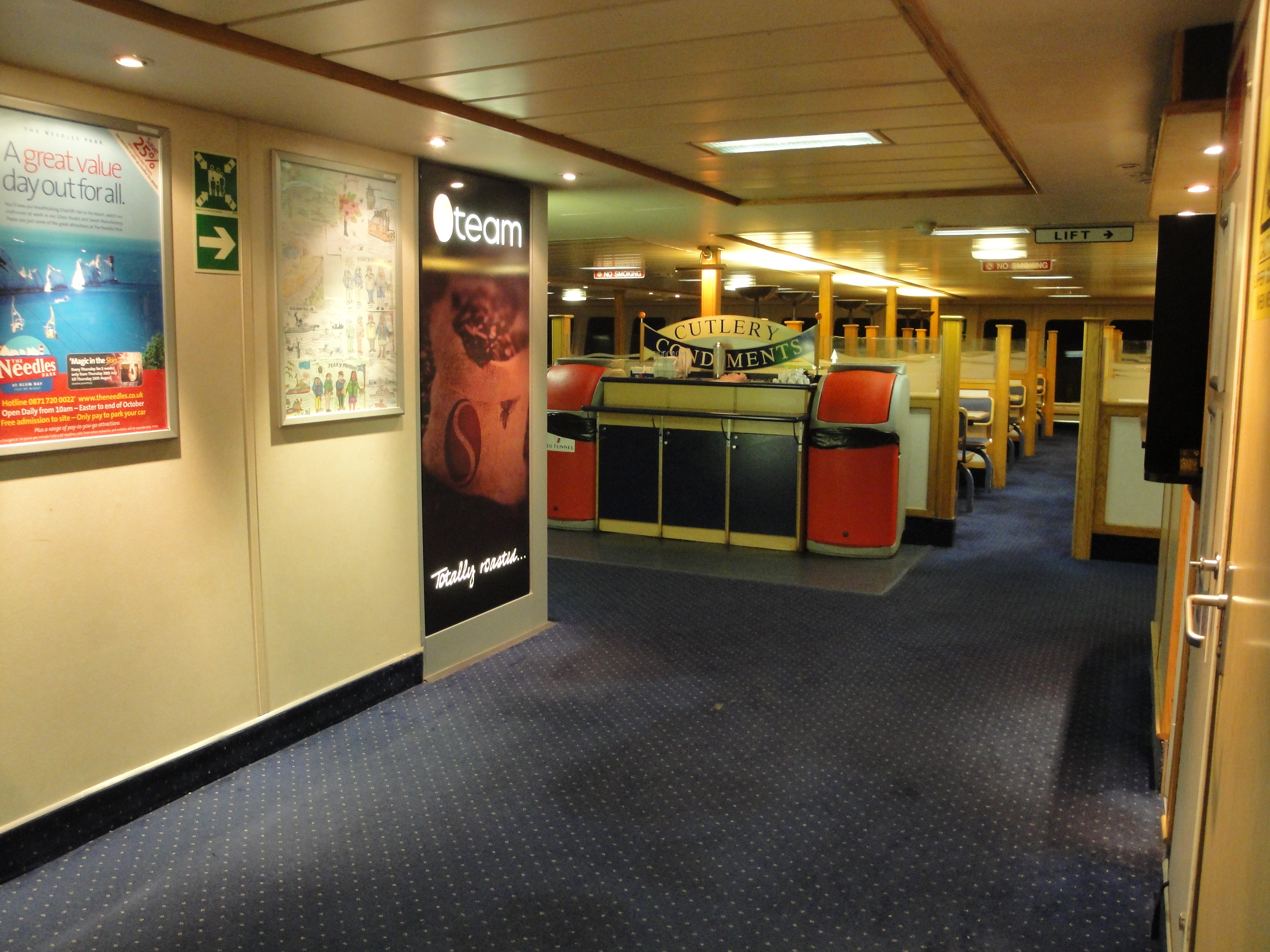
Red Falcon's B-Deck, pre-2014 refit

From February to April 2014, Red Falcon was in a drydock at Portsmouth for a major refit costing over £2 million. The refit provided an extra level of passenger accommodation with 55% more seating. The environmental footprint of the vessel was also reduced by installing LED lighting, and recycling facilities. A pair of webcams on top of the ship's bridge were also replaced, and provide footage of the ferry's journey.

== Incidents ==
On 10 March 2006, Red Falcon collided with the linkspan in Southampton, causing significant damage to the ferry's 'Southampton Side' bow doors. Vehicles, including an ambulance carrying a patient (evacuated by dinghy) had to remain onboard for over eight hours while engineers forced the door open.

On 29 September 2018 she collided with a 31 ft (9.4 m) motor yacht while approaching East Cowes, injuring two people on the yacht but sustaining no damage herself. Both vessels were travelling from Southampton to Cowes.

On 21 October 2018, she collided with several yachts, sinking one named Greylag, and ran aground on the Isle of Wight while trying to berth at East Cowes. A search and rescue mission was started after people nearby heard 'voices from the water', but this was called off after the voices were attributed to people on a nearby boat calling to the lifeboats in attendance. Heavy fog hampered the search and a helicopter searching the area had to turn back due to low visibility. Lifeboats from Cowes and Calshot were in attendance. Red Falcon was refloated with the assistance of tugs and docked in East Cowes. There were no reported injuries. Greylag, the yacht sunk by Red Falcon, was successfully raised and recovered on 23 October 2018.
