= Red Jet 7 =

Isle of Wight passenger catamaran ferry

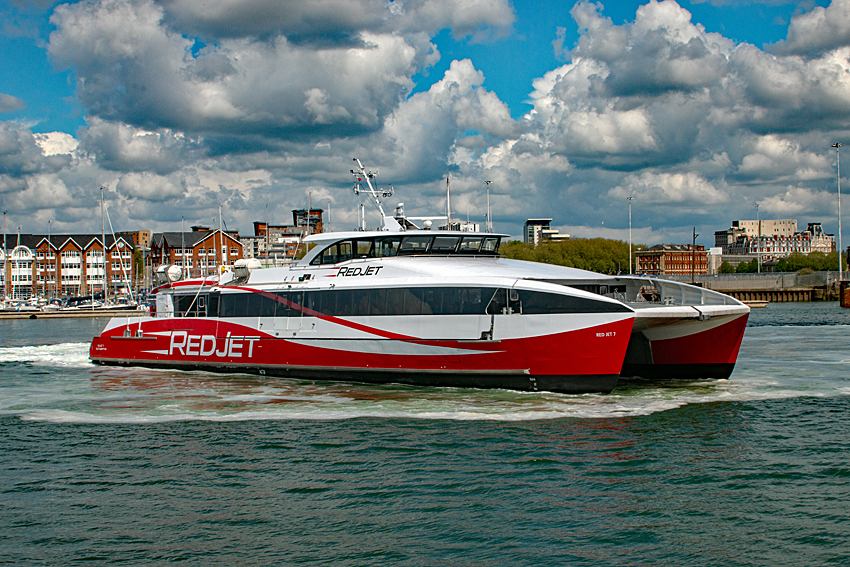
- Red Jet 7 departing Town Quay

History

United Kingdom
- Name: Red Jet 7
- Operator: Red Funnel
- Port of registry: (United Kingdom) Southampton, England
- Ordered: 2016
- Builder: Wight Shipyard
- Launched: 6 June 2018
- Completed: 6 June 2018
- In service: July 2018 - present
- Identification: IMO number: 9838321; MMSI number: 232015629; Callsign: MDCV7
- Status: In service

General characteristics
- Class & type: Catamaran ferry
- Length: 41.12 m (134 ft 11 in)
- Beam: 10.87 m (35 ft 8 in)
- Draught: 1.30 m (4 ft 3 in)
- Propulsion: 4 x MTU 2000 diesel engines; 4 x Hamilton HM751 water jets
- Speed: 38 knots (70 km/h; 44 mph)
- Capacity: 277
- Crew: 3-4

Red Jet 7 is a British high speed catamaran ferry operated by Red Funnel on its Southampton to Cowes route. It was launched on 6 June 2018 and entered service on 24 July

Designed by One2Three Naval Architects, Red Jet 7 has a length of 41.12 metres (134 ft 11 in), a beam of 10.87 metres (35 ft 8 in) and a draught of 1.30 metres (4 ft 3 in). She carries up to 277 passengers with a crew of three or four and is powered by four MTU 2000 diesel engines driving four Hamilton HM751 water jets, giving her a speed of 38 knots (70 km/h; 44 mph).
