= Red Jet 6 =

Isle of Wight passenger catamaran ferry

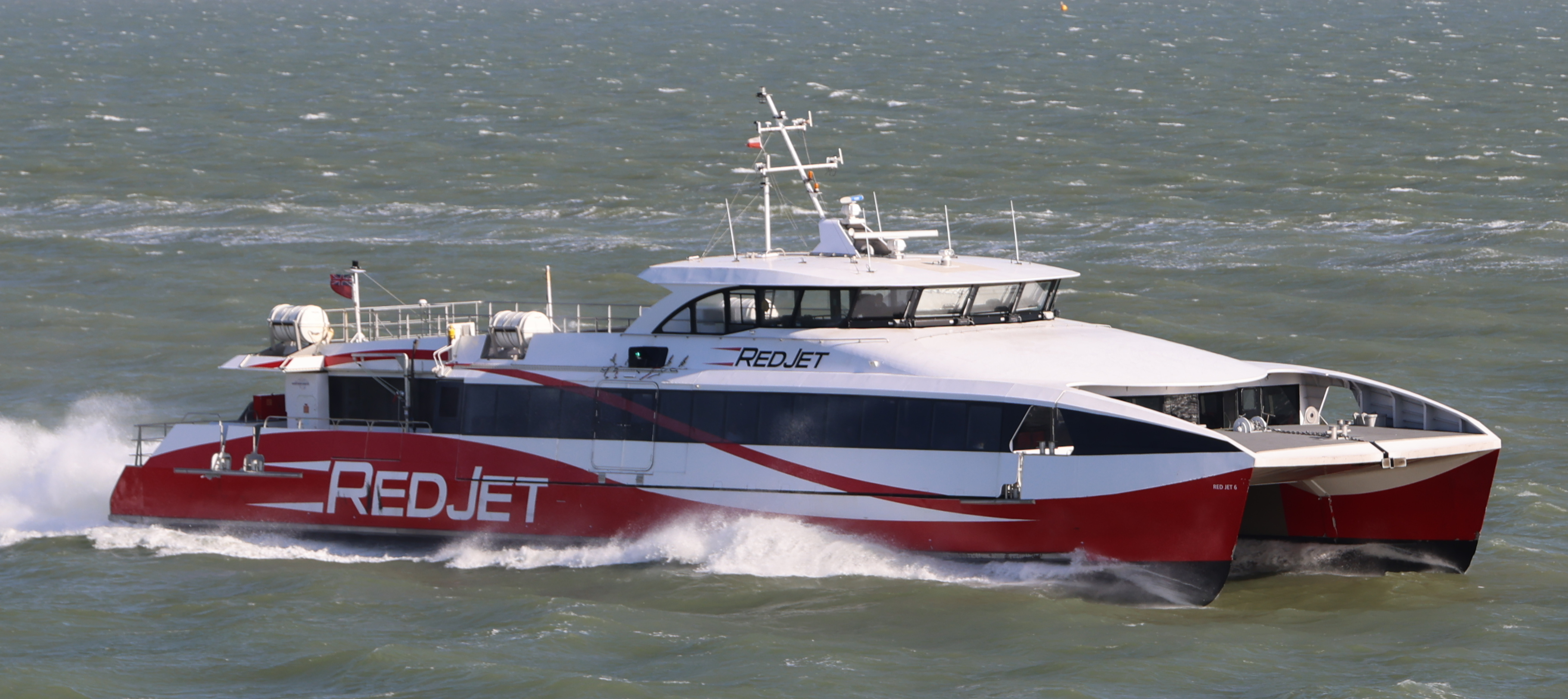
- Red Jet 6 crossing The Solent

History

United Kingdom
- Name: Red Jet 6
- Operator: Red Funnel
- Ordered: 2015
- Builder: Wight Shipyard
- Launched: May 2016
- In service: July 2016
- Identification: IMO number: 9788083; MMSI number: 235117926; Callsign: 2JPU3
- Status: In service

General characteristics
- Class & type: Catamaran ferry
- Tonnage: 363 GT
- Length: 41.12 m (134 ft 11 in)
- Beam: 10.87 m (35 ft 8 in)
- Draught: 1.30 m (4 ft 3 in)
- Propulsion: 4 × MTU 10V 2000 M72, 1,200 hp (890 kW) each, driving MJP500 waterjets
- Speed: 42 knots (78 km/h; 48 mph) max
- Capacity: 275
- Crew: max 4

MV Red Jet 6 is a high-speed catamaran ferry constructed for Red Funnel in East Cowes on the Isle of Wight as the sixth member of the company's Red Jet line of catamarans.

== History ==
Red Funnel announced in May 2015 that it had placed an order for the £6 million vessel with Wight Shipyard of East Cowes, making Red Jet 6 the first high-speed ferry built in the United Kingdom in 15 years. Designed by One2Three Naval Architects, Red Jet 6 was constructed in East Cowes's former aircraft hangar, originally built for the Saunders-Roe aircraft company. She entered service in mid 2016.

Red Jet 6 is 41.12 metres (134 ft 11 in) long, with a passenger capacity of 275. She is powered by four MTU series 2000 diesel engines, each powering a waterjet for propulsion and steering giving a service speed of 38 knots (70 km/h; 44 mph), allowing a crossing time of 23 minutes. She can operate with one engine out with only a minor reduction in speed.

Red Jet 6 was named by Anne, Princess Royal at a ceremony at East Cowes on 4 July 2016. On 29 June 2017, Red Jet 6 set a new record for the circumnavigation of the Isle of Wight by multihulls, starting and finishing at the Royal Yacht Squadron starting line at Cowes, taking 1 hr, 17 mins, 17 secs at an average speed of 39.42 knots (73.01 km/h; 45.36 mph).
