= Town Quay =

Quay in Southampton, England

Coordinates: 50°53′40″N 1°24′22″W

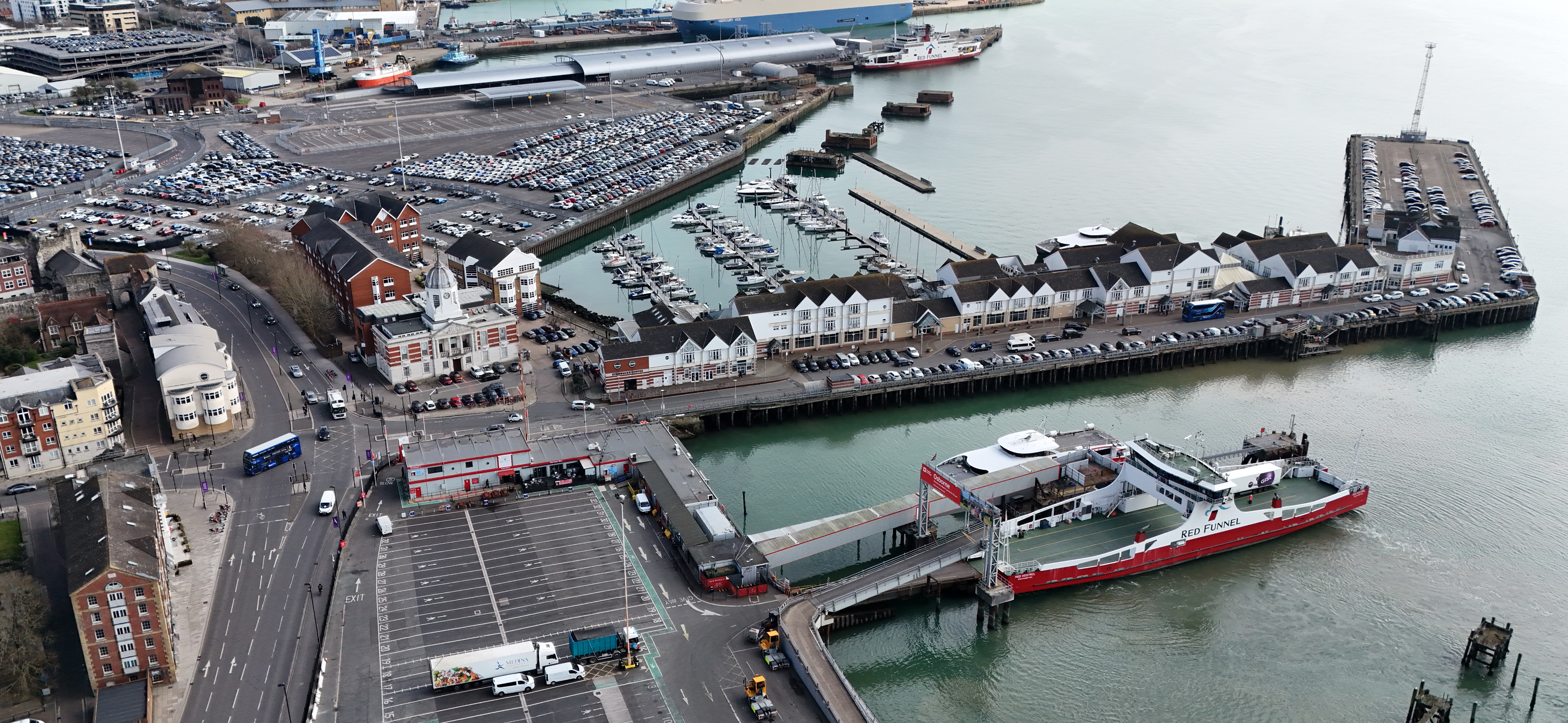
Town Quay view, 2025

Town Quay is a quay and pier in Southampton, England.

== History ==
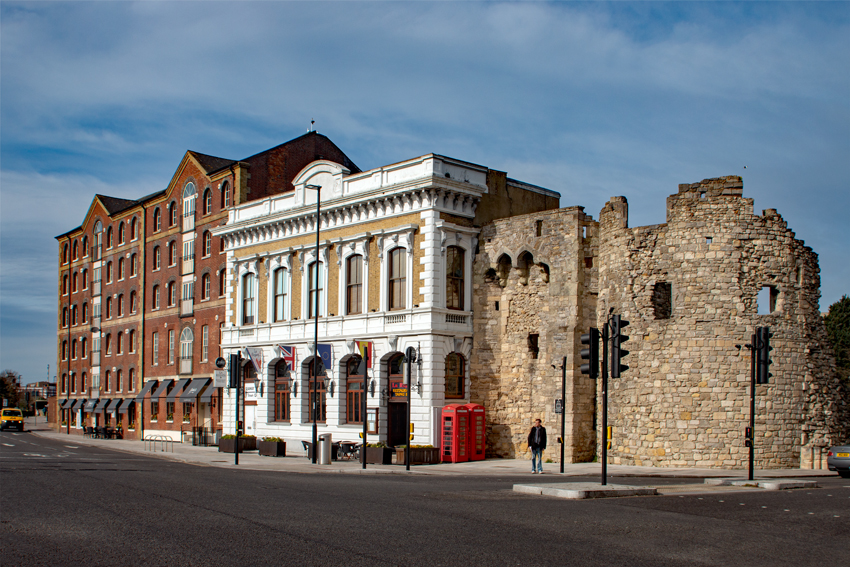
Geddes' warehouse, Seaway House and Water Gate tower

A quay is first recorded on the site in 1411, known as Watergate Quay. By 1450 a crane was present at the quay. Work to lengthen the quay took place in 1613 and 1765.

This quay fell out of use in the 18th century and in 1803 was demolished and replaced with a new structure, used for goods and passenger services. In the same year, control of the quay was taken over by the Southampton Harbour Commissioners as the result of the Southampton Harbour Act 1803 (43 Geo. 3. c. xxi). Gas lighting was added in 1821. Overcrowding made it unsuitable for passenger services, resulting in most of them relocating when the Royal Pier opened in 1833. Between 1829 and 1860, the memorial column raised to local landowner and MP, William Chamberlayne, was located at the quay. The Southampton Harbour and Pier Board replaced the Southampton Harbour Commissioners in 1863.

A horse-drawn tramway, completed on the last day of 1847, connected Southampton Terminus railway station to the quay. This tramway was directly connected to the railway in 1871. In 1876, upgrades to the tramway allowed a switch from horses to light locomotives. For many years the quay lines were worked by four of the diminutive LSWR C14 class locomotives, numbers 741, 743, 744 and 745, as well as an assortment of other small locomotives. They were eventually replaced by British Rail Class 04s but the sharpness of the curves on the pier meant some of the shunting had to be done by a fordson tractor.

In 1893 the quay switched to electricity to power its cranes.

During the First World War the quay was used for military traffic, mainly barges, traveling across the English Channel while the railway lines to the pier were used as sidings by the main Southampton Docks.

Construction and improvements in other parts of Southampton's docks in the 1930s resulted in much of the goods traffic moving away and the quay shifted to handling mainly passenger traffic. The last major freight traffic was Scandinavian timber, imported by Montague Meyer, but increasing charges by British Rail in the late 1960s brought about a switch to road transport. A ferry to Cracknore Hard, across the Test at Marchwood, survived until at least 1964.

The railway ceased being used on 4 May 1970, although the lines remained in place for a further nine years. Most of the warehouses on the quay were subsequently demolished, being replaced by offices and the Red Funnel ferry terminals.

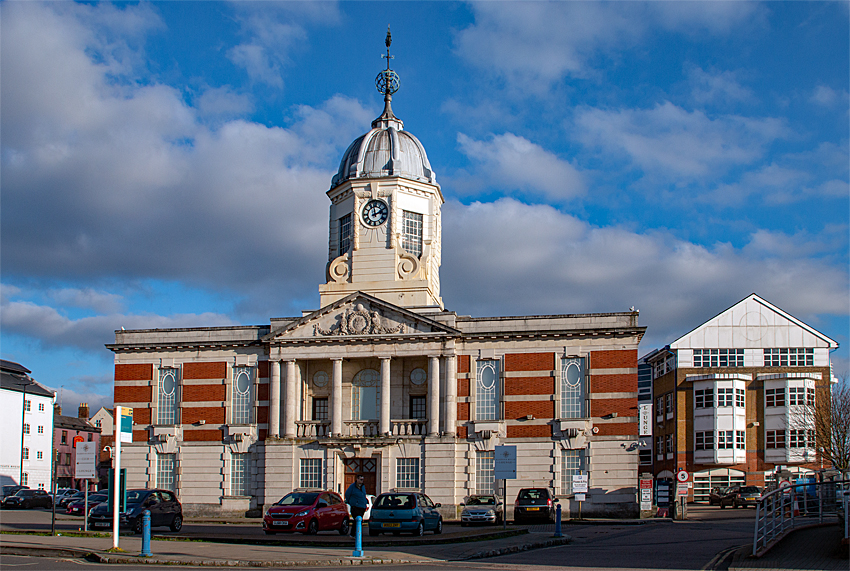
Harbour Board Office

== Present day ==
One of the last survivors of the original buildings, the Grade II listed Harbour Board offices, is now used as a casino having formerly been used, until 2015, as a gentleman's club; another survivor, the former Geddes Warehouse, also listed Grade II, has been converted into a boutique hotel and restaurant. The Italianate Seaway House, next door to the warehouse, houses a restaurant and is also Grade II listed. To complete the heritage area, a pair of K6 telephone kiosks on the corner of Seaway House are also Grade II listed. The medieval Water Gate Tower, at the entrance to the quay, is Grade I listed and a scheduled monument. To the east of the pier entrance, Eastgate House and Tower House, on the line of the city wall, are also Grade II listed.

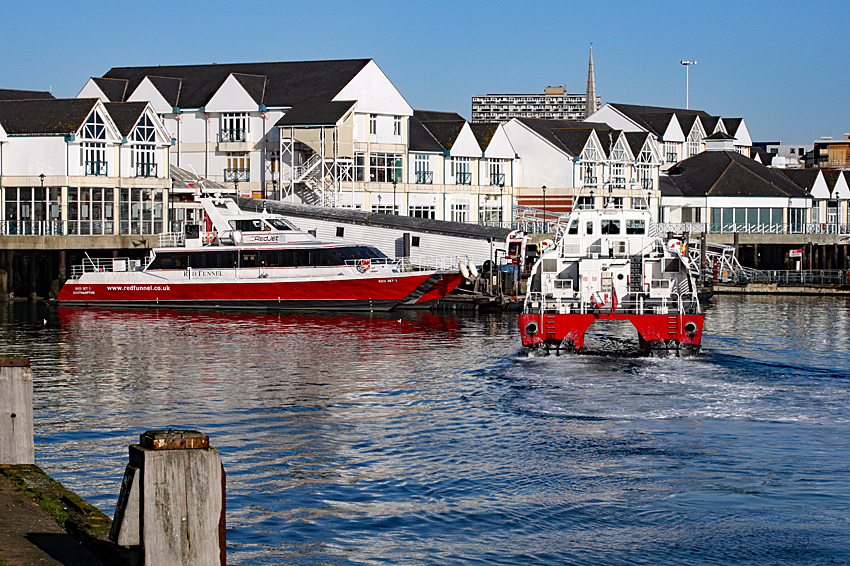
Two Red Jet fast ferries at Town Quay in 2008

Currently the pier section is used by the Hythe Ferry and the Red Funnel Red Jet high speed service to West Cowes. Red Funnel's vehicle ferries to East Cowes operate from the water frontage of the quay to the west of the pier, having moved there after the closing of Royal Pier at the end of 1979. The QuayConnect bus service, free to ferry passengers, connects the terminals to the town centre and Southampton Central railway station. The buildings on the pier provide office space for a variety of high tech and marine companies, and other commercial enterprises. A marina has been constructed on the east side of the pier, inshore of the high-speed ferry pontoons.
