= Red Jet 4 =

Isle of Wight passenger catamaran ferry

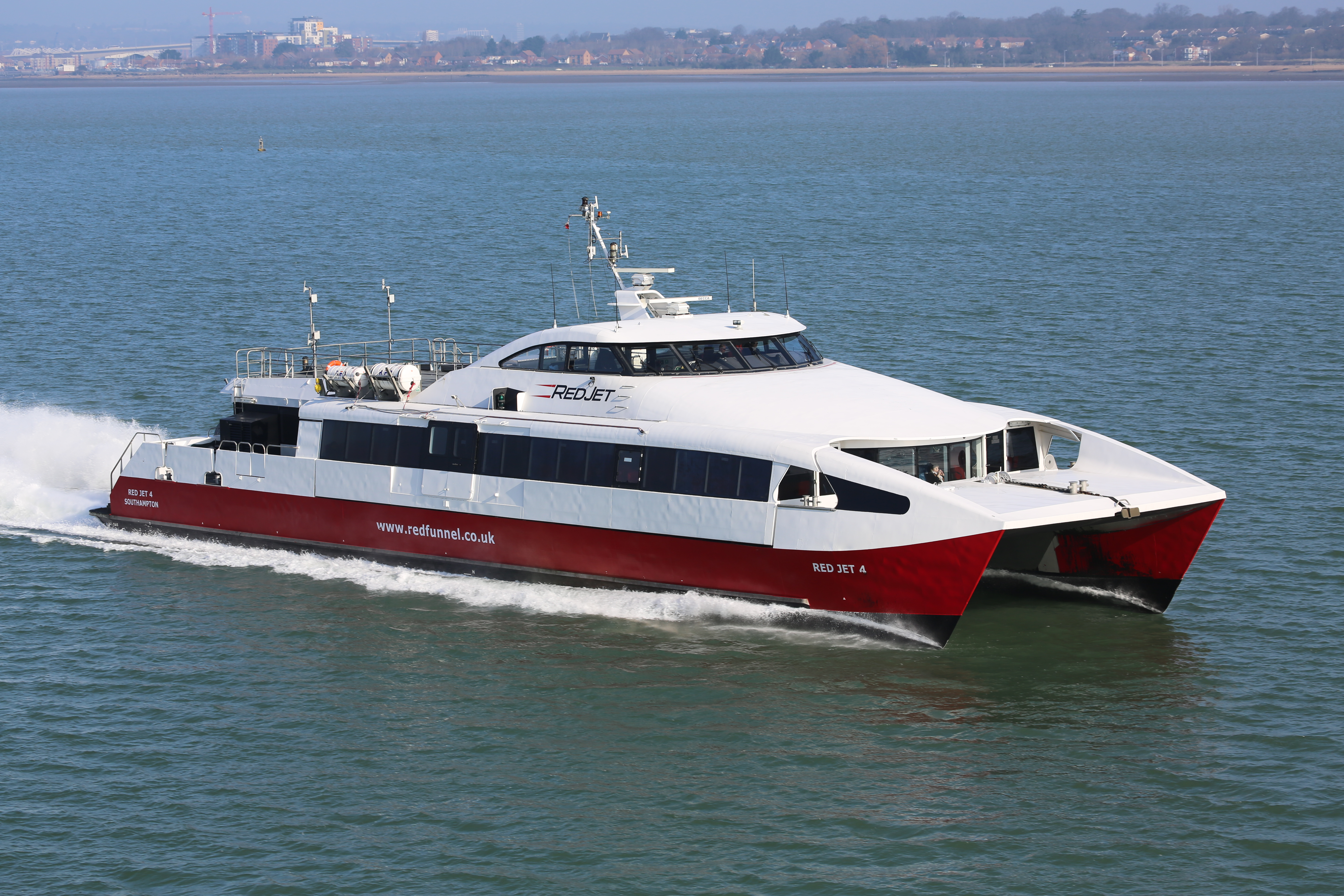
- Red Jet 4 travelling towards Cowes in March 2016

History

United Kingdom
- Name: Red Jet 4
- Operator: Red Funnel
- Port of registry: 2003–2024: Southampton, United Kingdom
- Builder: North West Bay Ships
- Yard number: 06
- Laid down: 2002
- Launched: 20 February 2003
- In service: 23 June 2003
- Identification: IMO number: 9295854; MMSI number: 235008564; Callsign: VQ113
- Status: Sold

General characteristics
- Class & type: Catamaran ferry
- Tonnage: 120 GT
- Length: 39.82 m (130.6 ft)
- Beam: 10.82 m (35.5 ft)
- Draught: 1.26 m (4.1 ft)
- Propulsion: 2 x MJP 650R-DD waterjets
- Speed: 38.1 knots (70.6 km/h; 43.8 mph) (increasing to 41 knots (76 km/h; 47 mph) when lightly loaded)
- Capacity: 275
- Crew: max 6

MV Red Jet 4 is a passenger catamaran ferry. It was operated by Red Funnel on its route from Southampton to Cowes from 2003 until 2024 when it was sold to Namhae Express Company, South Korea.

== History ==
She was built by North West Bay Ships in Hobart, Tasmania, Australia. After her launch on 20 February 2003 the catamaran was placed aboard a heavy lift ship to be transported to Southampton which arrived on 9 May 2003. She was officially named by Ellen MacArthur on 18 June 2003 and entered service five days later. During those five days the ship was used for a number of excursions including following the Round the Island Race.

On 11 November 2008 Red Jet 4 was used on a number of sightseeing trips to view Queen Elizabeth 2 before it left Southampton for the final time.

In March 2024 Red Funnel announced that Red Jet 4 had been withdrawn from service citing declining passenger numbers. In May 2024 Red Jet 4 was sold to South Korean ferry operator Namhae Express Company leaving aboard the ship AAL Kobe.

== Incidents ==
On 5 November 2016, while passing Fawley en route to Cowes, Red Jet 4 was in a sidelong collision with a man riding a jet ski. The man was uninjured and was picked up by a companion on another machine. Red Jet 4 circled to make sure the rescue was successful before continuing on its course.

== In popular culture ==
Red Jet 4 is featured in the 2008 video game Ship Simulator 2008 with the Red Eagle as a sailable ship, as well as featuring in Ship Simulator Extremes.
