= Red Funnel =

Ferry company operating on The Solent

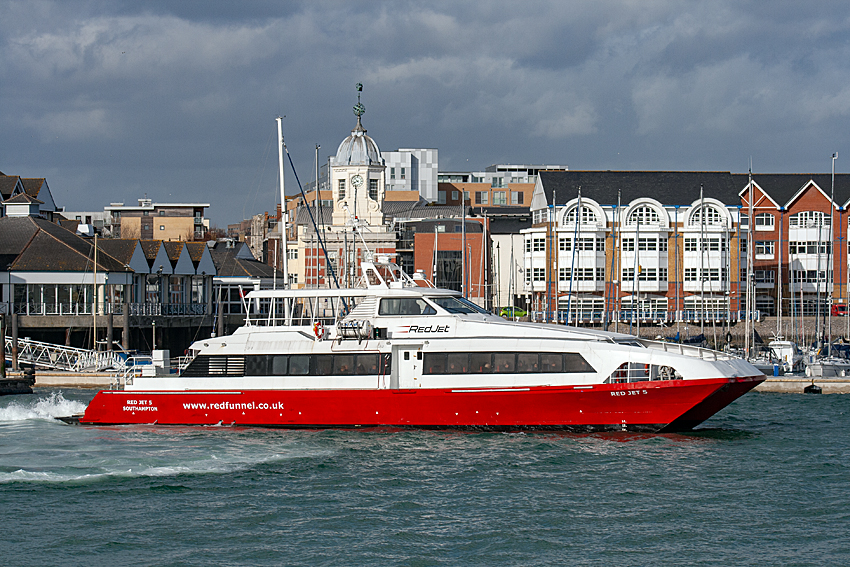
- Locale: Hampshire, England
- Waterway: The Solent
- Transit type: Passenger and car ferries
- Owner: Njord Partners
- Began operation: 1861
- No. of lines: 3
- No. of vessels: 7
- Hubs: Town Quay, Southampton
- No. of terminals: 4
- Daily ridership: 9,000
- Website: redfunnel.co.uk

Red Funnel, the trading name of the Southampton Isle of Wight and South of England Royal Mail Steam Packet Company Limited, is a ferry company that carries passengers, vehicles and freight on routes between the English mainland and the Isle of Wight. High-speed foot passenger catamarans, known as Red Jets, run between Southampton and Cowes, while vehicle ferries run between Southampton and East Cowes. It also runs the ferry between Southampton and Hythe.

Red Funnel's main competitor is Wightlink whose services operate from Portsmouth to Fishbourne and Ryde, and from Lymington to Yarmouth. The other major Solent ferry company, Hovertravel, operates between Southsea and Ryde. Both provide a frequent service to the Isle of Wight, but neither normally serve Southampton, Cowes or East Cowes.

== History ==
The origins of Red Funnel date back to 1820, when the Isle of Wight Royal Mail Steam Packet Company was established by Cowes interests to operate the first steamer service from there to Southampton. In 1826, the Isle of Wight Steam Packet Company was formed in Southampton, and by the following year the two companies had started co-ordinating their operations. In 1860, the Southampton, Isle of Wight & Portsmouth Improved Steamboat Company was created to compete with the two established operators, and the threat posed caused the two older companies to merge. They subsequently acquired the assets of the Improved Steamboat Company in 1865.

Formed in 1861, and called The Southampton Isle of Wight and South of England Royal Mail Steam Packet Company Limited, the merged company's name remains the longest for a registered company in the United Kingdom. The trading name Red Funnel Steamers was adopted in 1935 when all the company's ships had black-topped red funnels, and later shortened to the current Red Funnel. The 1861 name remains the company's formal name.

The company originally operated a paddle steamer ferry service between Cowes, Isle of Wight and Southampton. During its history, the company has operated other routes connecting the Isle of Wight and the English mainland, together with a sizable excursion steamer business along the South Coast of England including day trips from the Isle of Wight to France, but today services are concentrated on two routes. In 1931, it introduced its first diesel ferry, the MV Medina. Ferries have steadily increased in size to the current Scottish-built Raptor class operated between East Cowes and Town Quay in Southampton. Between 1969 and the 1990s, the company also ran Italian-built hydrofoils between Town Quay and Cowes. This route is now served by high-speed, passenger-only catamarans.

In 1867, Red Funnel instituted a service crossing the River Medina between Cowes and East Cowes. This service was operated by a series of small launches over the years. The service ceased on the outbreak of war in 1939, when the vessels involved were requisitioned by the Admiralty. In 1868, the company took over the Cowes Floating Bridge Company and operated the floating bridge until 1901.

In 1885, the company bought the New Southampton Steam Towing Company and operated tugs and tenders, later under the subsidiary Red Funnel Towage. In 2002, Red Funnel Towage was sold to the Adelaide Steamship Company, later passing to Svitzer Marine.

In 1946, Red Funnel acquired a controlling interest in Cosens & Co Ltd, a rival pleasure steamer operator based in Weymouth. This enabled the combined company to coordinate their excursions and also gave Red Funnel access to the Cosens' marine engineering and ship repair facilities. Excursions came to end in 1966 but the engineering side continued until sold off in 1990 to a management buy-out.

In 1989, the then-listed company was subject to a hostile takeover attempt by a consortium of Sally UK Holdings, Globe Investment Trust, 3i and merchant bank Tranwood Earl, at an offer of 205p per share. This was swiftly rejected and despite threats by Sally of a competing cross-Solent service, or a purchase of Sealink's Isle of Wight operations, a revised offer of 236p per share was made. Associated British Ports emerged as a White Knight in battle, firstly taking a 1% stake in Red Funnel and then extending this to a 264p per share full takeover offer. Sally withdrew and ABP's takeover of Red Funnel was given the go ahead in October 1989.

In 2001, the company was sold to JP Morgan Partners by Associated British Ports. In 2004, the company was sold again in a management buy-out backed by the Bank of Scotland for £60 million. On 12 April 2007, the owners of Red Funnel (which include HBOS) announced that they were considering selling Red Funnel. In June of the same year, the company was sold to the Prudential's infrastructure specialist, Infracapital, in a deal valuing the business at more than £200m.

In 2014, plans came to light for the relocation of Red Funnel's Southampton terminal, as part of the redevelopment of the derelict Royal Pier. The plans would include relocating the vehicle and foot passenger terminals to a new site at Trafalgar Dry Dock, also known as Pier 50. Plans were approved in 2016, and Red Funnel was supposed to relocate at the end of 2017. However, Southampton City Council terminated the deal to relocate the Royal Pier in August 2019, with the impact on the project to relocate the Red Funnel terminals unclear.

In 2017, the company was sold to a consortium, including West Midlands Pension Fund and the Workplace Safety & Insurance Board. In the same year, construction work began on renovating and enlarging the terminal at East Cowes, the first phase of which was completed in August 2018.

In July 2022, Unite members at Red Funnel went on strike over pay, causing the company to have to run a reduced timetable. According to Red Funnel, this was the first strike at the firm since 1966. The strikes were suspended in August 2022 after the company proposed a new pay agreement.

On 7 September 2023, Red Funnel announced the acquisition of the Hythe Ferry service from Blue Funnel Group. The service was renamed the Hythe and Southampton Ferry Company Limited. The service suspended on 22 August 2024 due to issues with the pontoon at the Hythe Pier.

In December 2025, Njord Partners, an investment company that also operates Ambassador Cruise Lines, completed a takeover of Red Funnel.

In February 2026, the suspended Hythe service was put up for sale. Ultimately, the Hythe and Southampton Ferry Company was liquidated on 9 April 2026.

=== The House Flag ===
Red Funnel's house flag

Red Funnel's house flag was adopted in 1861. The design was inspired by the names of the company's early paddle-steamers, Sapphire, Emerald, Ruby and Pearl. A simple rhyme was the guide to flying it correctly:

Blue to mast, green to fly,
Red on deck, white to sky.

== Routes ==
=== Red Funnel vehicle ferry ===
Between Southampton and East Cowes, Red Funnel runs four vehicle ferries. The crossing takes roughly an hour. The crossings are, for the most part, run on an hourly basis.

=== Red Jet high-speed ===
Between Southampton and Cowes, Red Funnel run two High Speed ferries, roughly taking 28 minutes to cross the Solent. The peak frequency is roughly every 35 minutes.

=== Hythe Ferry ===
Between Southampton and Hythe, Red Funnel ran an hourly service, which was operated by one dedicated passenger ferry. This service connected to the Hythe Pier. In April 2026 the Hythe and Southampton Ferry Company was put into voluntary liquidation by its parent company.

== Current fleet ==
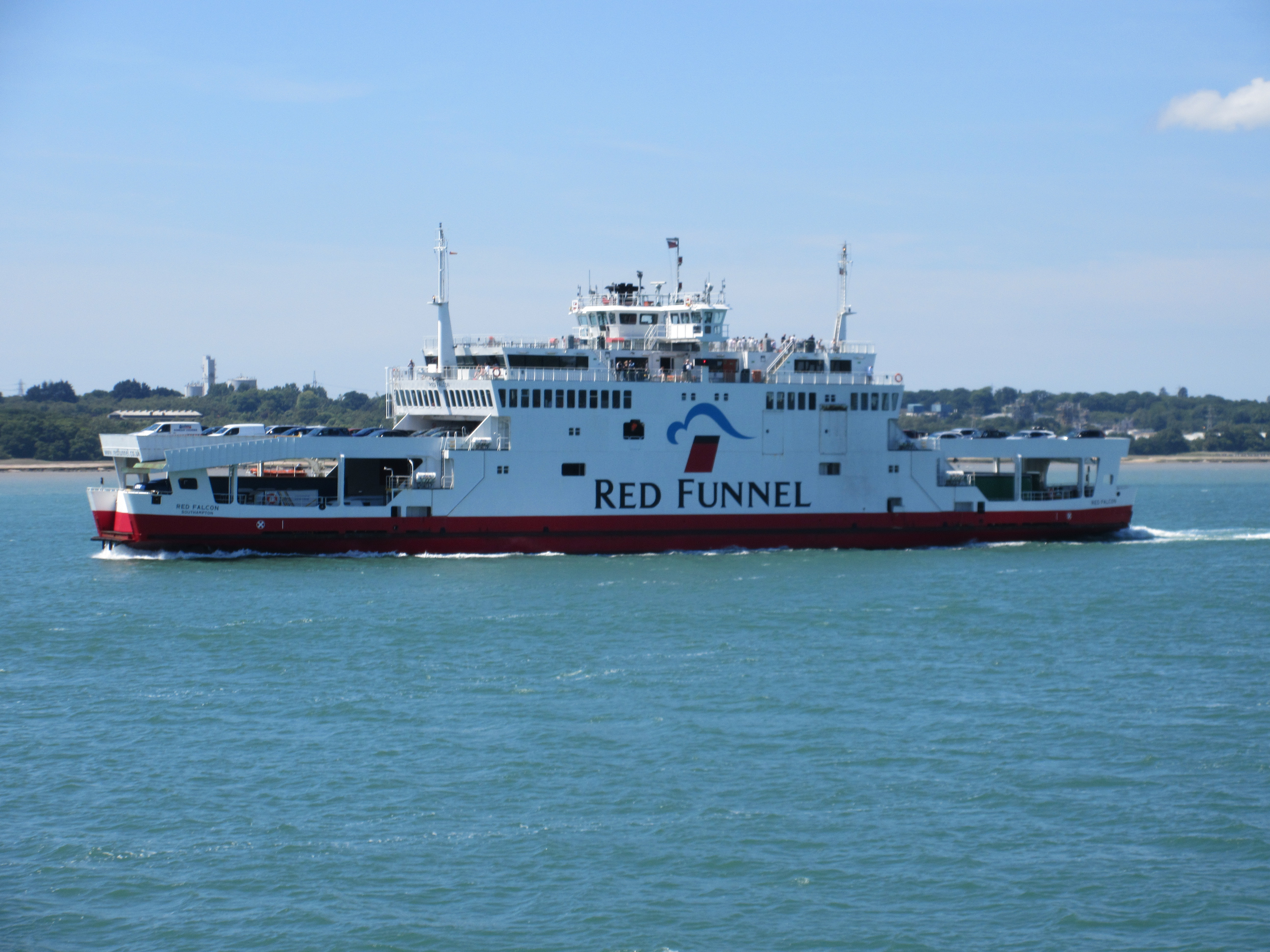
Red Falcon in Southampton Water

Vehicle Ferries	In service	Route
Red Falcon	1994	Southampton <> East Cowes
Red Osprey	1994	Southampton <> East Cowes
Red Eagle	1996	Southampton <> East Cowes
Red Kestrel	2019	Southampton <> East Cowes
Passenger Ferries	In service	Route
Red Jet 6	2016	Southampton <> Cowes
Red Jet 7	2018	Southampton <> Cowes
Hythe Scene	1992-2026	Southampton <> Hythe

=== Fleet history ===
Red Falcon, Red Osprey and Red Eagle were built by Ferguson Shipbuilders of Port Glasgow, and entered service between 1994 and 1996. Between 2003 and 2005 the ferries were refitted and extended both in length and height by Remontowa in Gdańsk, Poland. This was following a corporate decision driven by Tom Docherty to maximise summer operating capacity taking the previous capacity from around 100 CEUs to 213 CEU.

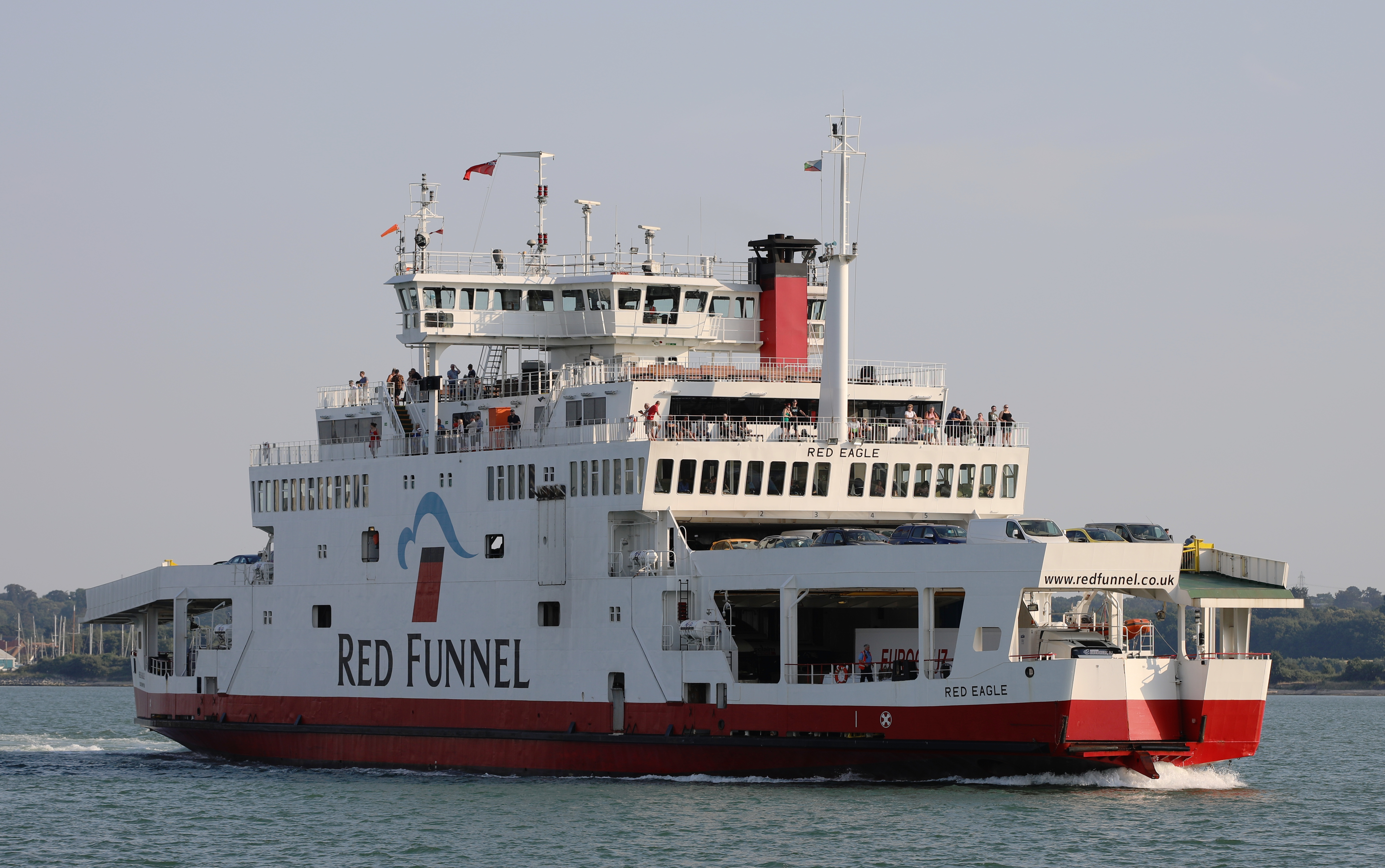
Red Eagle, Red Funnel's flagship, in 2018, bearing the new upper deck lounges added during refurbishment.

During 2014 Red Falcon underwent a £2.2 million refurbishment, which saw the interior and facilities replaced with a bright and new modern look. Due to success and increase of passengers on their services during 2014, it was confirmed that Red Osprey would also receive a £2.2 million refurbishment. Like her sister ship, the Red Osprey was refitted and relaunched almost exactly a year later. After a delay of three years, the Red Eagle was refitted at the end of 2017.

In 2016, Red Funnel took delivery of a new 40-metre high-speed catamaran constructed in East Cowes by Wight Shipyard. Named by the Princess Royal on 4 July 2016, Red Jet 6 entered service later in the summer. Red Jet 7 was built by Wight Shipyard in East Cowes. Red Jet 7 was lowered into the River Medina at East Cowes on 6 June 2018, and was christened during a launching ceremony on 24 July 2018.

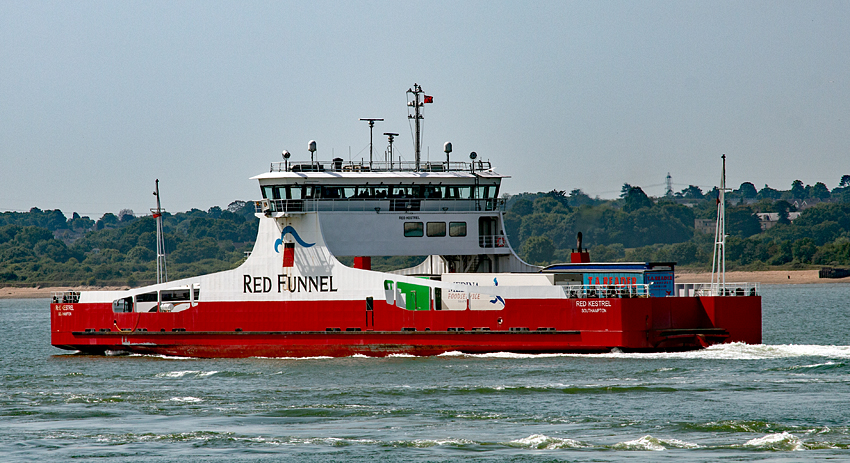
Red Kestrel ferry heading down Southampton Water

In February 2018, Red Funnel announced plans to introduce a new freight only ferry into the fleet, to coincide with the refurbishment of their facilities on both sides of the Solent. It was built at the Cammell Laird shipyard in Birkenhead, and was designed to have similar dimensions to Red Funnel's Raptor-class fleet, allowing it to load and unload at the same linkspan used by the other ferries. Construction of the new ferry began on 31 May 2018 with a formal keel laying ceremony. During this event, the ship's name was announced to be Red Kestrel, placing its name in line with those of the rest of Red Funnel's RO-RO ferry fleet. She entered service in May 2019.

== Future fleet ==
In July 2024, it was announced that Red Funnel would order a new, all electric, Artemis eFoiler hydrofoil boat, to run on the Red Jet route of Southampton to Cowes. The vessel would carry 150 passengers and be capable of charging in less than 60 minutes. It is scheduled to enter service by late 2025.

== Incidents ==
- On 9 March 1997, Red Falcon, inbound from Cowes, collided in Southampton Water with the outbound trailing suction hopper dredger Volvox Hansa in fog. Both ships' masters were held to blame.
- On 10 March 2006, Red Falcon, collided with the linkspan at the Southampton Town Quay terminal. Eight passengers and one crew member were injured and significant damage was caused to the Southampton end of the Red Falcon and to the linkspan. The collision caused a 5-metre (16 ft) hole above the waterline and buckling of the car deck doors.
- Red Eagle collided with Humber Energy in the Thorne Channel, near Southampton Water, on the evening of 21 December 2006. Coastguards said nobody was injured and neither vessel was badly damaged. Richard Pellew, of the Maritime and Coastguard Agency, said: "Having examined the minor damage sustained to the Red Eagle we are advising Red Funnel on the repair work the ferry needs before it can resume normal service."
- On 5 November 2016 a man on a personal water craft collided with Red Jet 4. No one was injured and no damage was caused.
- Red Eagle was involved in a collision in thick fog on 27 September 2018. It was reported that the ferry had ploughed through the moorings of three yachts and a channel marker was struck. The following month, the Red Falcon also hit several yachts at East Cowes in thick fog, sinking one of them. The vessel grounded in the incident with forty passengers aboard and was not refloated until three hours later. The sunken yacht, Greylag, was recovered the following day.
