= Jean Bart (disambiguation) =

Jean Bart (1650–1702) was a French naval commander and privateer.

Jean Bart may also refer to:

- Jean Bart (writer) (1879/80–1955), an American writer
- Jean-Bart, a French automobile manufacturer of the early twentieth century
- Eugeniu Botez or Jean Bart (1877–1933), Romanian novelist

== Vessels ==
- French ship Jean Bart (1790), a 74-gun ship of the line
- French corvette Jean Bart (1793), a 20-gun corvette
- French ship Jean Bart (1786), a 24-gun corvette of the French Navy from 1794 that the Royal Navy captured in 1795 and sold in 1797.
- French ship Jean Bart (1852), an 80-gun ship of the line
- Jean Bart, a ship of the line originally named Donawerth
- French cruiser Jean Bart (1889), a first class cruiser of 4,800 tonnes
- French battleship Jean Bart (1911), a 23,600 tonne battleship
- French battleship Jean Bart (1940), the last French battleship completed
- French frigate Jean Bart (D615) (1988), an anti-aircraft frigate
- Le Jean Bart (2002), a replica of a 1670 84-gun ship-of-the-line

== See also ==
- French ship Jean Bart, an expanded list of French naval vessels and privateers named after Jean Bart
