= PS Waverley =

1946-built preserved seagoing paddle steamer

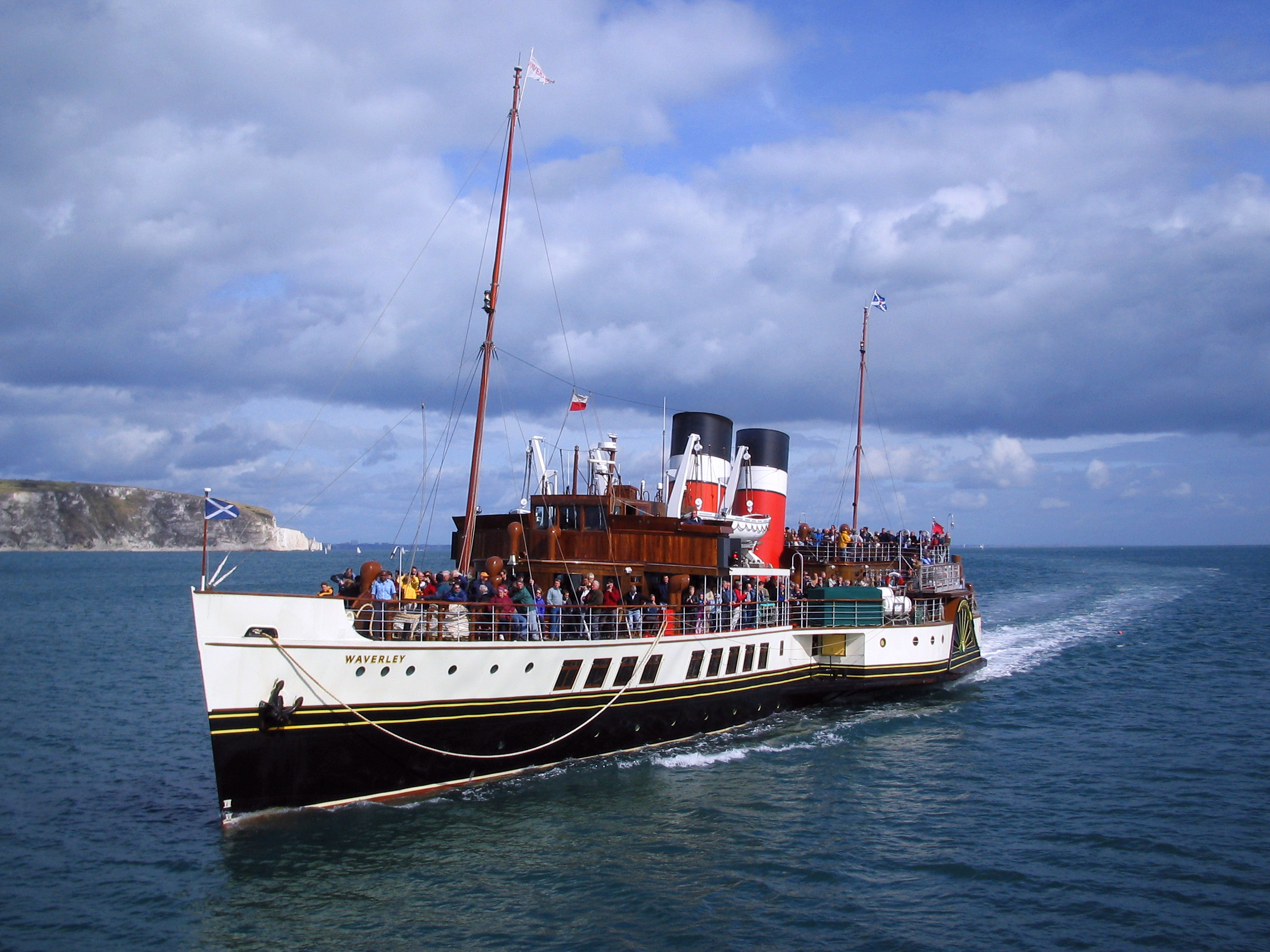
- Waverley at Swanage

History

United Kingdom
- Name: PS Waverley
- Owner: Since 1974: Paddle Steamer Preservation Society
- Operator: 1946–48: London and North Eastern Railway; 1948–73: Caledonian Steam Packet Company; since 1973: Waverley Excursions
- Builder: A. & J. Inglis, Glasgow
- Yard number: 1330P
- Launched: 2 October 1946
- Maiden voyage: 16 June 1947
- Identification: IMO number: 5386954; Callsign: GRPM; MMSI number: 232001540
- Status: Operational

General characteristics
- Class & type: Coastal excursion paddle steamer
- Tonnage: 693 grt; 327 nrt
- Length: 239 ft 11 in (73.13 m) s
- Beam: 57 ft 3 in (17.45 m) s
- Draught: 6 ft 3 in (1.91 m) s
- Installed power: 2,100 ihp (1,566kW)
- Propulsion: Diagonal triple expansion steam engine built by Rankin & Blackmore, Greenock
- Speed: 14 kn (26 km/h) in service; Trials speed in 1947 18.37 kn (34.02 km/h) at 56 rpm
- Capacity: Up to 925 passengers in Class V waters.

PS Waverley is a Clyde steamer, the last seagoing passenger-carrying paddle steamer in the world. Built in 1946, she sailed from Craigendoran on the Firth of Clyde to Arrochar on Loch Long until 1973. Bought by the Paddle Steamer Preservation Society (PSPS), she has been restored to her 1947 appearance and now operates passenger excursions around the British coast.

Since 2003, Waverley has been listed in the National Historic Fleet by National Historic Ships UK as "a vessel of pre-eminent national importance".

== History ==
PS Waverley is named after Sir Walter Scott's first novel. She was built for the London and North Eastern Railway (LNER) to replace a PS Waverley that was sunk in 1940 while helping to evacuate troops from Dunkirk. The new vessel was ordered from shipbuilders A. & J. Inglis of Glasgow, who laid the keel at their Pointhouse shipyard on 27 December 1945, Lady Matthews, wife of the Chairman of the LNER, launched the new 693 ton steamer on 2 October 1946. Fitting out proceeded, around the end of the year the ship was towed to Victoria Harbour in Greenock where Rankin & Blackmore installed the engine and coal-fired boiler they had manufactured. After sea trials in June 1947, Waverley entered service on 16 June, working the LNER's Firth of Clyde steamer route from Craigendoran Pier, near Helensburgh, up Loch Long to Lochgoilhead and Arrochar, joining the LNER Clyde paddle steamer fleet of Lucy Ashton, Jeanie Deans and Talisman. In her first year in service, she wore that company's red, white and black funnel colours.

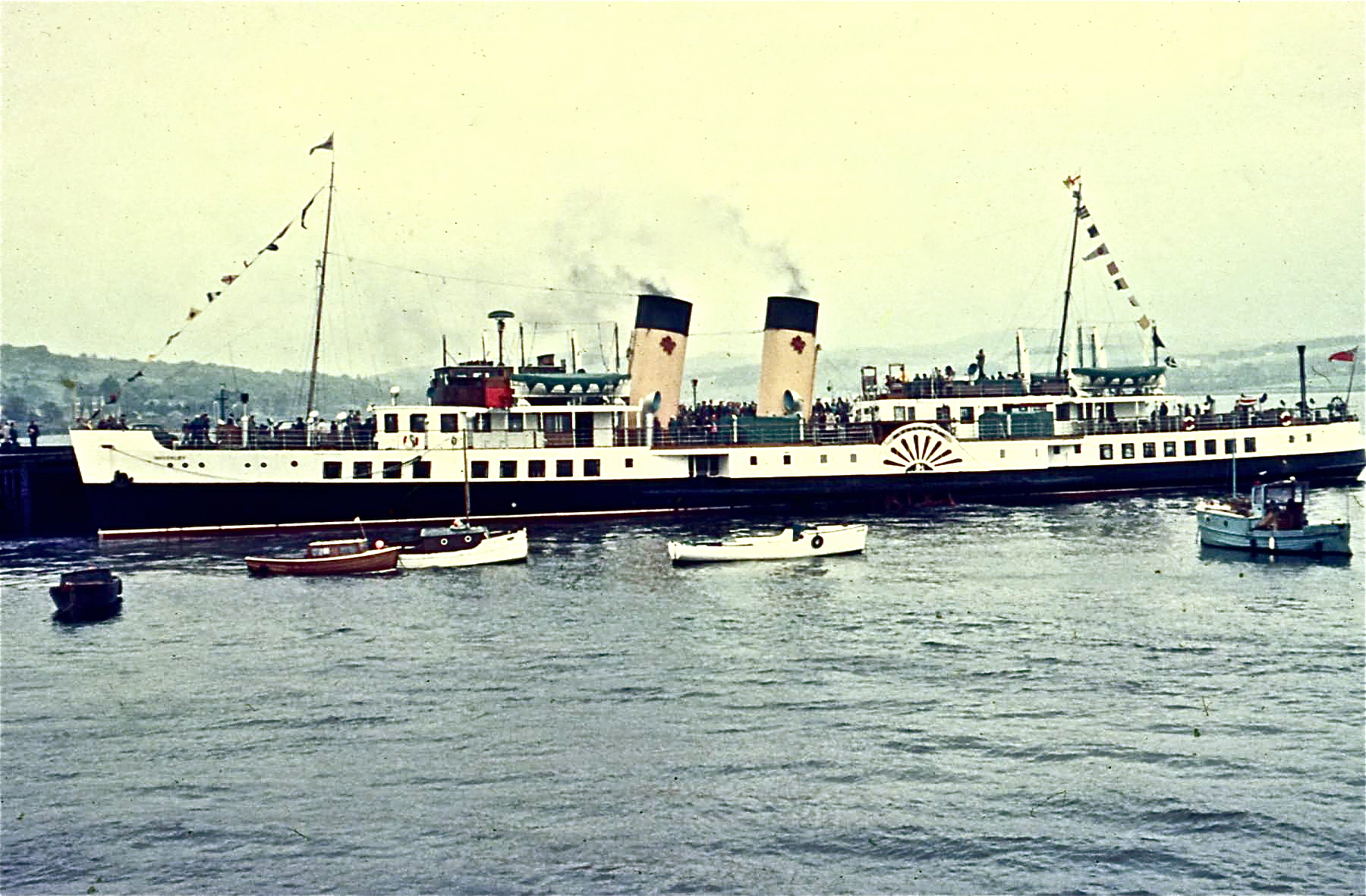
Waverley with red lions on her yellow funnels in 1970

The 1948 nationalisation of Britain's railways brought their Scottish steamers into the Caledonian Steam Packet Company (CSP), a subsidiary of the Railway Executive. The funnels were repainted yellow with a black top. In 1965, a Scottish red lion rampant was fixed to each side of both funnels. Waverley's hull was painted monastral blue until 1970.

After a revival of fortunes in the 1950s, the 1960s saw a gradual change in holiday habits that led to a decline in passenger numbers and the closure of many of the small piers. Since 1969, and the formation of the Scottish Transport Group, the CSP had been gradually merging with the West Highland shipping and ferry company David MacBrayne Ltd. In 1973, the company became Caledonian MacBrayne Ltd (CalMac).

== Restoration ==
CalMac withdrew Waverley after the 1973 season as she was too costly to operate and needed significant expenditure. By then, the Paddle Steamer Preservation Society had been set up as a registered UK charity and had bought the near-derelict small River Dart paddler PS Kingswear Castle. CalMac, keen to ensure that the ship was preserved, sold Waverley to the PSPS for the token sum of one pound. Neither side really believed that the vessel would return to steam but, just in case, Caledonian MacBrayne stipulated that she should not sail in competition with their remaining cruise vessel, TS Queen Mary.

A public appeal was launched to secure funding for the return of the Waverley to service and the fund-raising operation was successful. The PSPS found itself running a cruise ship operation, "Waverley Excursions". Since then, Waverley has been joined in the PSPS fleet by PS Kingswear Castle and MV Balmoral and has had a series of extensive refits and much restoration work, including a new boiler and improvements to meet modern safety standards. She has circumnavigated Great Britain and every year makes extensive sailings around the country.

Listed as part of the National Historic Fleet, between 2000 and 2003 the ship underwent a substantial rebuild and reboilering at the shipyard of George Prior at Great Yarmouth, funded principally by the Heritage Lottery Fund. The work, done in two stages, has added many 21st century safety and technological improvements and returned the ship to her original 1947 livery.

In 2009, the ship was affiliated with HMS Defender, having hosted the official dignitary party at Defender's launch on the River Clyde. And in 2011 the ship was awarded the Institution of Mechanical Engineers 65th Engineering Heritage Award.

In 2019, Waverley was withdrawn from service due to boiler problems. An appeal was subsequently launched with a target of £2.3 million to recommission Waverley. It was announced on 11 July 2019 that new boilers had been ordered from Cochran Ltd.

Following the boiler replacement, Waverley returned to sea on 13 August 2020 for sea-trials, and resumed service for a short COVID-19-affected season starting on 22 August. This was cut short after she struck the pier at Brodick on 3 September, damaging her bow.

The following year Waverley started operating from 29 June but with limited passenger capacity due to COVID-19. The sailing season was described as a success, with a total of 52,000 passenger journeys, but shorter than normal as it only lasted until 19 September. A highlight for passengers and crew were the dolphins that could frequently be spotted as they accompanied Waverley on her sails up and down the Clyde.

== Engine ==
Engine in operation

Waverley is powered by a three-crank diagonal triple-expansion marine steam engine built by Rankin & Blackmore, Engineers, Eagle Foundry, Greenock, Scotland. It is rated at 2,100 IHP and achieved a trial speed of 18.37 knots (34.02 km/h; 21.14 mph) at 57.8 rpm. Passengers can watch this engine from passageways on either side of the engine room.

The main crank is solidly attached to both paddle wheels so they cannot turn independently. The Waverley therefore has a much larger turning circle than modern ships of the same size.

== Appearance ==
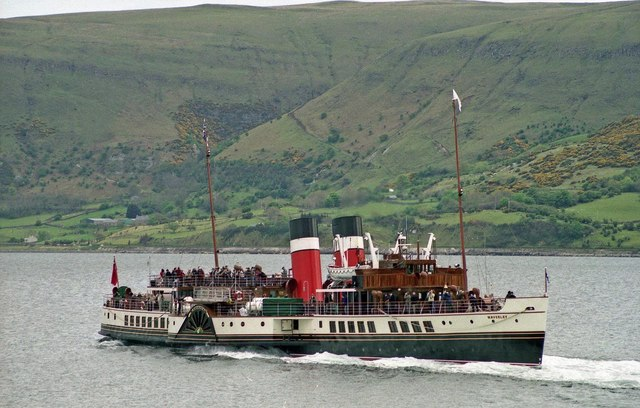
PS Waverley departing Red Bay in County Antrim, Northern Ireland in 2005

Waverley has had several colour schemes in her life. At launch the paddle boxes were painted black, in 1959 they were changed to white, then returned to black but with white edges in 1972, then to all black in 1977. The two gold stripes along the hull were removed in 1954 but restored during the 2000 rebuild. Today, Waverley has the LNER 1947 livery of red, white and black funnels, traditional brown-grained (or "scumbled") superstructure and black paddle-wheel boxes, decorated with gold lettering on each side.

When launched Waverley had square windows on her sponsons, instead of the current portholes. For most of her life, the upper passenger cabins were painted white and had wooden doors; all have had layout improvements at some time in the ship's life. Sailing in all weathers in salt water can cause pale brown rust streaks to appear by the end of each season, so cosmetic painting and improvements are done annually as the ship is drydocked and inspected by the Department for Transport.

Since 1962, when PS Waverley's original funnels were renewed, replacement items had been slightly out of parallel due to their heavier welded steel construction. The problem was resolved in the 2000–03 refit and her two funnels are now parallel.

Lifeboat arrangements have varied depending on the legislation at the time. Between 1975 and 1980, there was only one traditional lifeboat on the rear deck.

== Service ==
On cruise from Greenock via Largs, leaving Keppel pier at FSC Millport, Great Cumbrae, on way to the Isle of Arran.

Waverley makes passenger excursions from various British ports, including ports in Northern Ireland. She regularly sails from Glasgow and other towns on the Firth of Clyde, the Thames, the South Coast of England and the Bristol Channel. She also undertakes private charters and has provided a period setting for television documentaries and movies, such as Sherlock Holmes: A Game of Shadows (2011).

Primarily during the summer she is based on the Clyde, operating excursions from Glasgow, Greenock, Largs or Ayr.

Typically her Clyde timetable ends at the end of August and Waverley spends 6 weeks between September and October cruising the Bristol Channel, the Solent and the Thames before returning to the Clyde for two sailings in October.

On 3 September 2020, Waverley collided with the Brodick Pier on the Isle of Arran, causing damage to the bow. Twenty-four people were injured. The ship was carrying 213 passengers and 26 crew, who were temporarily stranded on Arran. A Caledonian MacBrayne ferry, MV Caledonian Isles, made an unscheduled sailing to return them to the Scottish mainland later that evening.

During the 2021 season Waverley was unable to operate south of the Clyde owing to crew availability. 2022 marked the 75th anniversary of her maiden voyage and she was able to return to other parts of the British coast.

In 2023, during the ships sailing to the South Coast, Waverley and the steamship SS Shieldhall sailed side-by-side as the two vessels passed The Needles. The occasion of the two vessels with similar histories sailing together was met with great praise from guests on both vessels and garnered national attention for both vessels.

On 3 October 2025, Waverley broke down while on a cruise from Southend to Gravesend. She returned to Southend and the cruise was cancelled, along with its next sailing.

== See also ==
- PS Ryde
- PS Decoy
