= PS Monarch =

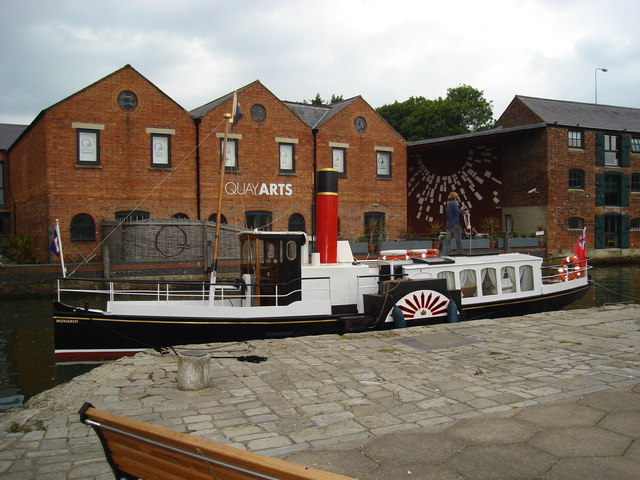
- Berthed by The Quay Arts in Newport, Isle of Wight

History

United Kingdom
- Name: PS Monarch
- Port of registry: River Frome, Dorset
- Route: River Frome, Dorset
- Ordered: 1984
- Builder: Brian Waters together with Colin Carr at Mr Carr's boatyard Lemons at Rochester Kent.
- Launched: 1994
- Acquired: 2004
- Maiden voyage: 2004
- In service: 2004
- Status: In service

General characteristics
- Type: Paddle steamer
- Tonnage: 42
- Length: 42 feet
- Beam: 15 feet at its widest
- Propulsion: Diagonal steam engine
- Speed: 6 knots
- Capacity: 12 passengers
- Crew: 1

PS Monarch is one of the three active paddle steamers in the United Kingdom. Construction started in 1984 and it was launched in 1994, although the steam plant originated as a 19th-century tar pump from Caerphilly gas works. At only 42 feet long, 8 feet wide and with a capacity for only 12 passengers, she is the world's smallest commercial paddle steamer.

The Monarch was designed and built by Brian Waters, who was a key volunteer in finally restoring the paddle steamer Kingswear Castle. It was a dream of his to construct his own paddle steamer from scratch. Construction was originally started in 1984, but it took him almost twenty years before she was finally finished, entering commercial service in 2003.

The PS Monarch was based at Island Harbour Marina on the Isle of Wight for three seasons from 2008 until 2010, offering excursions in the River Medina.

The vessel now operates from Wareham on the River Frome, Dorset. She is one of the smallest paddle steamers in UK.
