= Island Harbour Marina =

Coordinates: 50.725°N 1.277°W

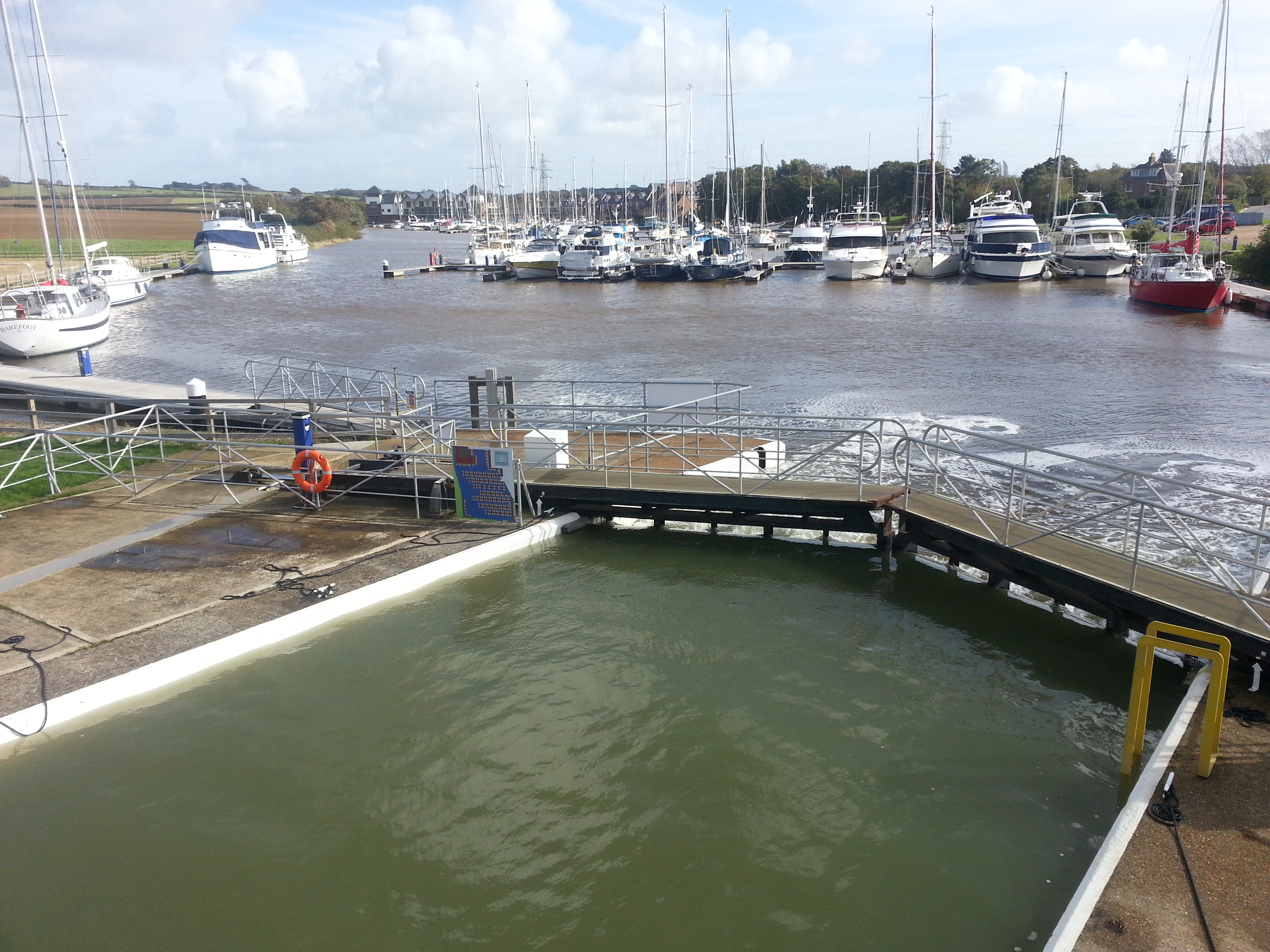
- Island Harbour Lock at high tide
- Unitary authority: Isle of Wight
- Ceremonial county: Isle of Wight
- Region: South East
- Country: England
- Sovereign state: United Kingdom
- Post town: Newport
- Postcode district: PO30
- Dialling code: 01983
- Police: Hampshire and Isle of Wight
- Fire: Hampshire and Isle of Wight
- Ambulance: Isle of Wight
- UK Parliament: Isle of Wight West

Island Harbour Marina, on the Isle of Wight, UK, is a commercial marina on the River Medina in the small hamlet of Binfield. It is located approximately halfway between Cowes and the County Town of Newport. Being a relatively small marina, it best suits pleasure craft of up to 20 metres in length. The marina accommodates both annual berthholders and short-term visiting craft.

As the River Medina is tidal, the marina has lock gates to maintain a sufficient operational depth. It also means that access to the marina by boat is dependent on the state of the tide and the draught of the vessel concerned. A table showing the approximate access times is shown below.

Island Harbour Marina was built in 1966 on the site of a demolished water mill, with the main part of the marina being formed by enlarging the original millponds. The marina's creators and first owners were cousins Alan and Colin Ridett, together with Robert Trapp.

As well as arriving by boat, access to the marina can be gained by car, bus and river water taxi. A new riverbank cycle-way has recently been completed between Newport and Island Harbour Marina, with further plans for it to be extended to the Folly Inn in the future.

== Features ==
As well as the marina, there is a large hardstanding area for around 100 boats to be stored ashore. The marina also has its own on-site restaurant. There is an on-site chandlery, boat builders and repair workshop, with a 50-ton travel hoist.

At Island Harbour there are also 96 holiday homes and three permanent dwellings situated within the marina grounds. In November 2014, work began on building a further 25 holiday apartments, due for completion in early 2017. A brand new customer showerblock was completed in June 2015 and in 2016, work was started on two more blocks of apartments. Also in 2016, the on-site restaurant was greatly enlarged and refurbished and a new chandlery and boat repair workshop was built on land to the rear of the hardstanding.

A major feature of the site is the paddle steamer Ryde, currently in a very poor state. More details of this vessel are shown below.

At the far eastern end of the marina is a nature reserve, where birds and other wildlife are left completely undisturbed. On the southern boundary of the marina land is a fairly large lake, which is currently unused.

Road access to Island Harbour is via Mill Lane, which connects to North Fairlee Road (A3054). In Mill Lane, adjoining Island Harbour, is Binfield Farm. The farm has long been associated with Island Harbour and been in common ownership.

== Tidal access times ==
The safe access times up the River Medina to Island Harbour, before and after High Water are as follows, depending on draught:-

Draught	Spring Tides	Neap Tides
Up to 1.0 metre	+/- 4 1/2 hours	Unrestricted
1.5 metres	+/- 3 hours	+/- 3 hours
2.0 metres	+/- 2 hours	+/- 2 hours
Over 2.1 metres	+/- 2 hours	Check with marina office

To stay in the deepest water, yachtsmen should steer straight for the green navigational buoy immediately off of the marina's holding pontoon. A 90 degree turn to port just before it, will take vessels parallel to the pontoon and into/through the lock. Yachtsmen should be beware of the mudbanks either side of the entry channel and stay within the channel markers.

== The Spice Bus ==
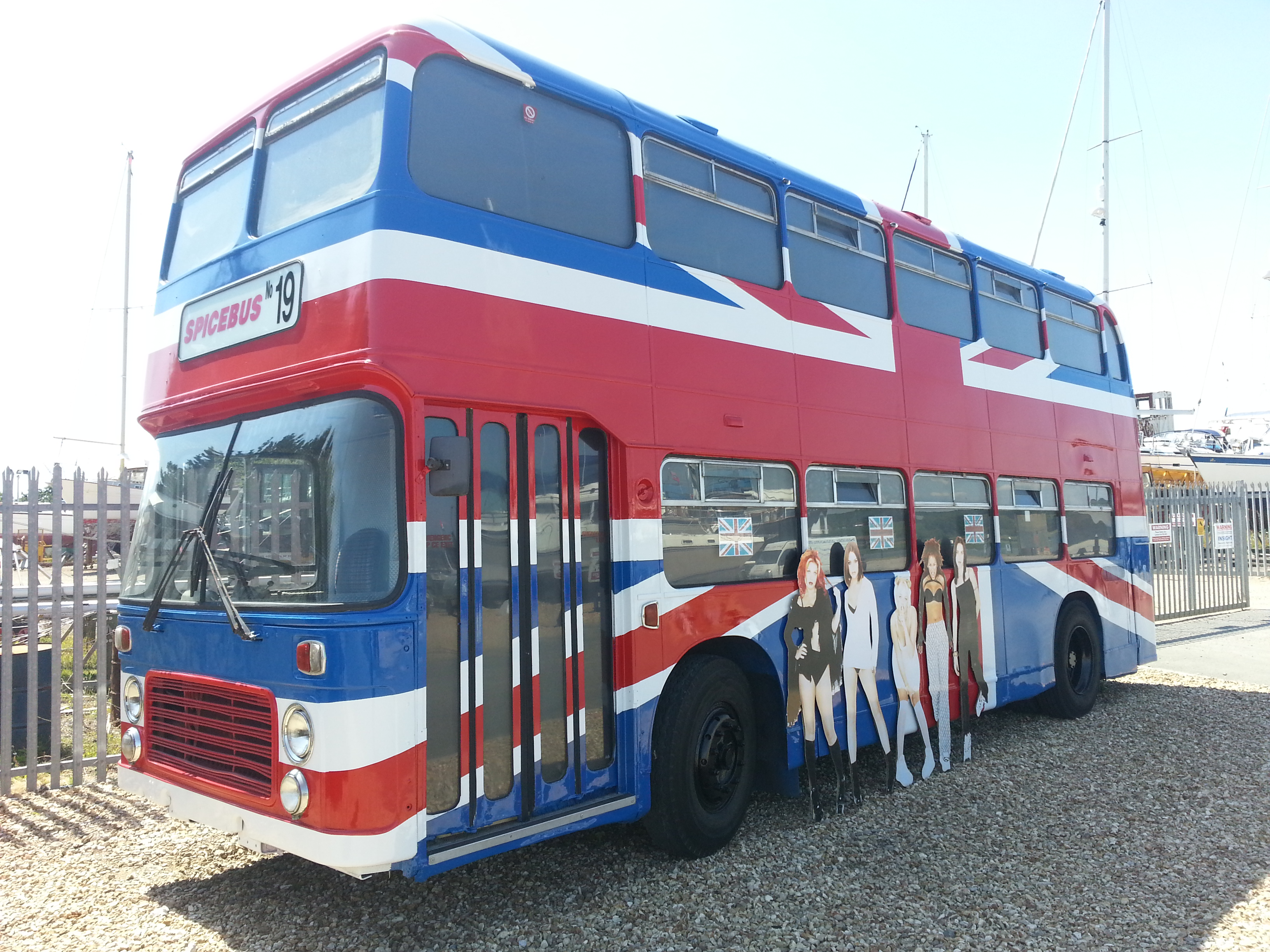
The "Spice Bus", from the film Spice World, is on permanent display

On 18 July 2014, The Spice Bus was put on permanent display at Island Harbour Marina. It is the original bus used in the Spice Girls' 1997 film, Spice World. In the film, the brightly-coloured, Union Flag painted tour bus driven by Dennis (Meat Loaf) transports the Spice Girls around London to all of their engagements and appearances.

The Spice Bus is a 1978 British Leyland Bristol VRTSL3 double-decker.

== History ==
=== From the Medieval times onwards ===
The known history of Island Harbour goes back to the Middle Ages when the land was owned by the medieval abbey of St Mary of the Quarry (or Quarr Abbey), which was founded in 1132. The abbey was granted areas of the nearby parish of Whippingham in the early to middle of the 13th century by Henry de Clavill. Shortly afterwards, the abbey also acquired the lands of Cleybrokes or Cleybroc, which would have encompassed the whole of the Island Harbour site. The prominent features of the site are the two 'lucks' or streams which flow into the River Medina. One of these has been known at various times as both Claybrooks Luck and Great Luck, whilst the other is North Fairlee Luck.

Around 1250, the monks built a mill on the site and dammed the two lucks to form "sea-ponds" or fishing lakes. It is unclear whether they were actually used for fish or for oyster cultivation, which has always been a very lucrative industry on the River Medina. There was also a dedicated farm called Claybrook Farm, which is now known as Binfield Farm. With its access to the River Medina, it is thought to have been a possible route through which the abbey transported its wool to Southampton.

Later, in 1430, the Cleybrokes Farm site was leased by the abbey for life to William Knyt; and in 1487 to Joan Legge, widow of Thomas Legge. In 1517, this lease was passed on to John Pocock of Chillerton. Then, in 1536, with the Dissolution of the Monasteries by Henry VIII, ownership of the lands passed from Quarr Abbey to The Crown. It remained a crown possession until 1628, when it was granted by Charles I to The City of London in satisfaction of debts owed.

Later, Claybrook Luck came under the control of Claybrook Farm and North Fairlee Luck came under the control of Heathfield Farm. Both were being used for oyster production, which is perhaps an indication that this was always the case. Oyster production carried on here right through the 17th and 18th centuries, with the oysters of the River Medina being widely regarded as the best in England! In fact, oysters were still being cultivated commercially in the River Medina right up until 2005.

In 1711, there was a dispute over who had the rights to produce oysters in the two lucks, which went to court. John Redston and Edward Faulkner were farming them, with the permission of the land-owners. However, as a fisherman by the name of William Cave had been granted sole rights by the Borough of Newport to fish the whole of the River Medina, he believed that he also had the sole rights to the lucks as well. He confiscated 2000 oysters, as well as firing a warning shot over the head of one of Redston and Faulkner's workers.

=== East Medina Mill ===
In 1790, a local baker called William Porter built East Medina Mill on the site, in partnership with William Gregory, a Newport hairdresser. Built on the site of a former army barracks, it was to become one of the great English tide mills. The oyster lakes became the mill's millponds and the water wheel was placed right where the current marina's lock gates are now situated. Almost from the moment when William Porter built it, East Medina Mill became known as Botany Bay Mill, because it supplied the transport ships which were taking convicts to Australia.

East Medina Mill was originally 80 feet long, 30 feet wide and built on five floors. It had an undershot wheel, two sets of barley stones, one American wheat cutter, one oat cutter, three pairs of French stones, a flat roof for drying; and could grind thirty loads of wheat per week. Having both mill ponds full on Spring tides, gave enough water flow to turn the wheel sufficiently to run the mill for six hours. Vessels of up to 70 tons could berth alongside the mill in the river, for loading and unloading.

The southern half of the mill, described as a "bakehouse and storehouse", was from the start still occupied as a hospital and barracks by His Majesty King George III's troops. These were Hessian mercenaries from Germany and Prussia. In 1794, eighty four of these soldiers died of typhus and were buried in the nearby Whippingham Church. There is a memorial there to them, placed by The Landgraf A F of Hesse in April 1906. During the Napoleonic Wars in the early 1800s, French soldiers were also barracked at East Medina Mill as prisoners of war.

As well as building East Medina Mill, Porter also built West Medina Mill on the other side of the river (nicknamed 'Port Jackson') and Yarmouth Mill. However, in doing so, he over-stretched himself and the Newport Bank, which financed him, foreclosed on the loan. He was declared bankrupt in 1791, before their completion and died soon after in 1794 of a malignant fever. The Hampshire Chronicle reported that he left a pregnant wife and four small children totally unprovided for. West Medina Mill was also used as barracks, housing Dutch soldiers of Count Bentinck's regiment. It seems that the soldiers at both East and West Medina Mill were barracked there in between being sent to assist in, among other things, the quelling of the Irish Rebellion of 1798.

Following William Porter's bankruptcy in 1791, the mill was put out on lease, awaiting its sale. William Roach took over the lease for the mill and its lands from John White, Esquire of Fairlee in 1797. He eventually bought the mill outright. He then also built East Medina House, which was to become the residence of many of the owners of East Medina Mill. This house still exists in Mill Lane, although its name was changed to Tide Mill House some years ago.

In 1856, a carter by the name of Daniel Sheath was killed, whilst working at the mill. He was stopped in his wagon when another gig passed by, out of control, after its horses took fright. Sheath got down from his wagon and endeavored to stop the horses, but was run over and died of a fractured skull. In 1863, there was another death at the mill when the 22 year old Henry Slade was dragged into a bean crusher by his clothing, which was revolving at 600 revolutions a minute. He died instantaneously, sustaining serious head injuries, a broken back and two broken legs. He was described as a sober, steady man, but careless around machinery. An accidental death verdict was given.

The mill remained in Roach's family for the next 140 years, spanning eight generations, with John Roach being the last to operate it. In 1930, much of the mill was badly damaged by a terrible storm which ripped off most of the roof and sent it flying up to 100 yards into nearby cottages. In 1933, the aging Roach sold the mill to the Newport Corporation (the local council), but stayed on as a tenant until September 1937, by which time he was 78 years old. He also owned West Mill and Lower Shide Mills, but by the time of his eventual retirement in 1939, he only had West Mill left. Newport Corporation advertised for new tenants for East Medina Mill, but from the time that John Roach left it, the mill was only ever used as a place of storage by the Council. Evidence shows that they allowed it to fall into a state of disrepair and by 1943 it was considered to be structurally unsafe. In 1945, the disused building was damaged even further by a major fire and it was finally demolished in 1950.

=== The Medway Queen Marina ===
Later, in the 1960s, cousins Alan and Colin Ridett, with Robert Trapp, constructed the new marina on the old site, which opened in 1966. By this time, they had already bought the Paddle Steamer PS Medway Queen, which arrived in 1965 (see below). This was to be the new Medway Queen Marina's first clubhouse, with berths being available in the original tide mill's two millponds. Despite having been open for some years, the Medway Queen Marina was officially opened on Friday 28 May 1971 by M. Claude Prouvoyeur, the Mayor of Dunkirk. This was because of the Medway Queen's heroic achievements there during the second world war. At this time in 1971, the marina won the British Tourist Authority's "Come to Britain" award. At the same time the marina also boasted a swimming pool, which has long since disappeared.

=== Island Harbour Marina ===
Since those early days, the marina has had four different names, being The Medway Queen Marina from 1966, Wight Marina from 1972, Medina Yacht Harbour from 1977 and finally to its current name, Island Harbour Marina from 1987.

The marina has also changed hands a number of times over the years. Eamon O'Connor and his business partner Kevin Webb, bought the marina in January 2013 operated under the company name Uavend Investments LLP. In September 2022 they went into administration, In 2025 it was announced that Moses Oyediwura and Jamie Emiabata, the owners of the Breeze restaurant at Island Harbour had now purchased the marina, under the company Island Harbour Marina (IOW) Limited.

== The paddle steamers of Island Harbour ==
Island Harbour has long been associated with a number of paddle steamers, moored there as floating nightclubs and restaurants. The most well-known of these are the Medway Queen and the Ryde. However, less well-known is the Kingswear Castle, which was at the marina for four years from the late 1960s. There was in fact a period of nine months between September 1970, when the Ryde arrived and June 1971 when the Kingswear Castle left, that Island Harbour boasted three paddle steamers, all at the same time. Now, only the PS Ryde remains, which is in a derelict state.

=== Paddle Steamer Medway Queen ===
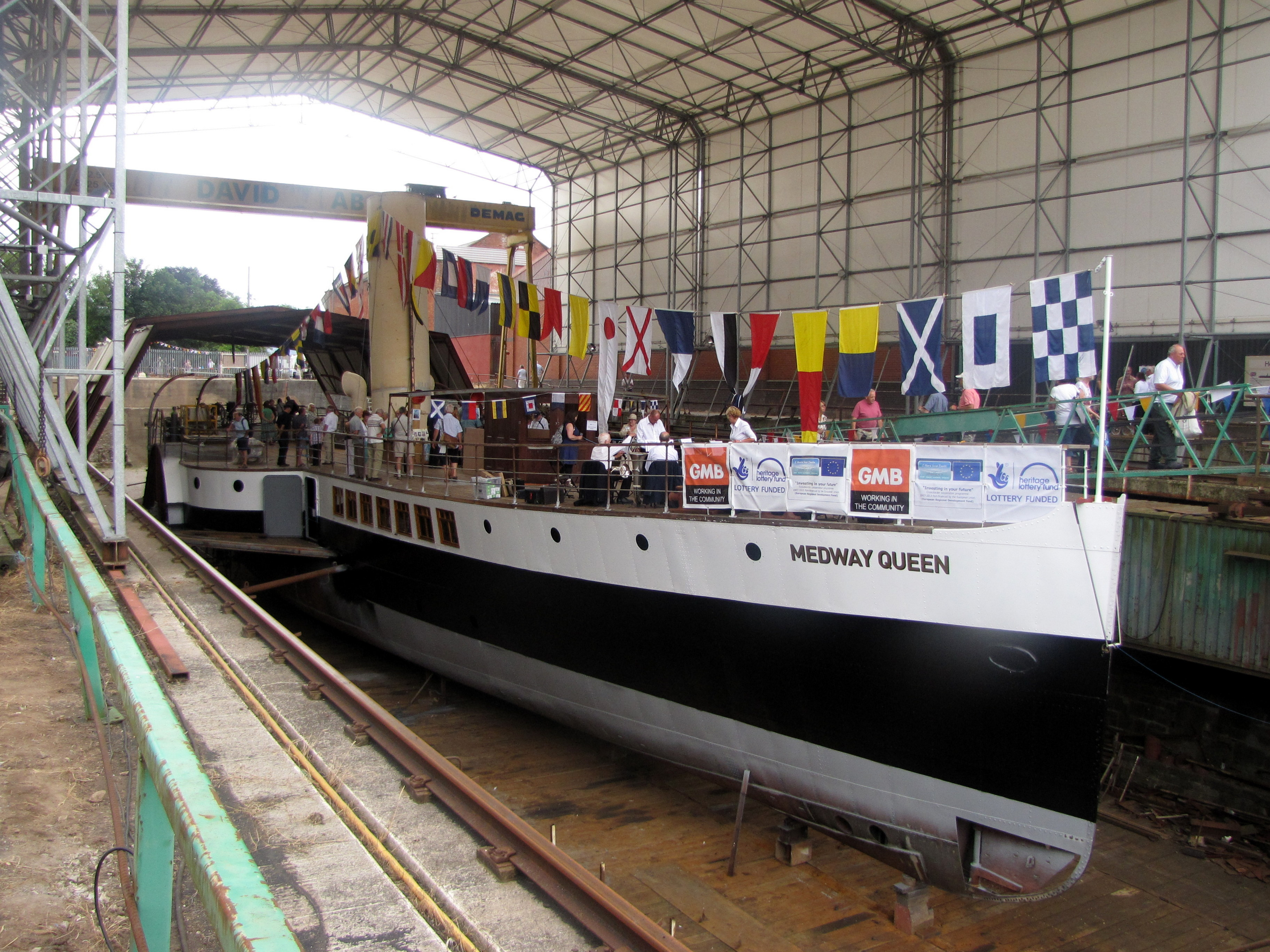
The PS Medway Queen in the Albion Dry Dock, Bristol, undergoing refurbishment in 2013

The marina's first paddle steamer was the PS Medway Queen, which arrived on 28 September 1965, ready to be converted into the clubhouse, restaurant and nightclub for the new marina which was due to open the following year. The Medway Queen Club, as it was going to be called, was to be the centre-piece of the Medway Queen Marina. Having been due to be scrapped before this, the Daily Mail set up a campaign to save her and she was duly rescued by the Ridetts, together with various preservation trusts, who paid £6,000 to buy her from a Belgian breaking company. It must have been perfect timing for the businessmen planning the new marina.

The Medway Queen had a distinguished career. She was built in 1924 by the Ailsa Shipbuilding Company of Troon on the Firth of Clyde, for operation on the River Medway. She steamed between Strood and Southend and was principally a pleasure-ship, running excursion trips for the holidaymakers. She was 179 feet long, weighed 316 tons, had a crew of 30 and originally had a service speed of 15 knots. She could carry 980 passengers and was coal-fired. However, In 1938, she was converted to run on oil and then after the war, her licence was reduced to carry 828 passengers.

During World War II, the Medway Queen was drafted into war service and converted into a minesweeper. Her aft end was modified to accommodate minesweeping equipment, she was painted battleship grey and she was fitted with anti-aircraft guns. She was renamed HMS Medway Queen and given pennant number N48. Other than her service as a minesweeper and a training ship, her pinnacle of achievement came when she became the "Heroine of Dunkirk". In the course of the evacuation, she made a record number of trips (seven) across the English Channel, rescued over 7,000 soldiers and was given four awards for gallantry. On her final crossing, she was severely damaged by a collision with another warship, but still managed to make it home.

After the war, the Medway Queen returned to her former career on the River Medway and remained in service until September 1963, when she was sold to the Forte Group, who intended to turn her into a floating restaurant and hotel. But when they could find no place to berth her on the River Thames, they sold her to ship-breakers, Van Heyghen Brothers of Belgium. However, when they found out that they had been asked to break up the "Heroine of Dunkirk", Van Heyghen Brothers declined to continue. This allowed time for the Daily Mail to set up their campaign and for the Medway Queen's ultimate arrival at Island Harbour.

The Medway Queen Club and nightclub became a huge success, with its four saloons converted into a restaurant, nightclub, casino and function room. It was officially opened on 14 May 1966 by Commander J D Graves, the ship's First Lieutenant during the second world war. However, it quickly became apparent that at 179 feet long, she was just too small and so in 1970, the 216 feet long PS Ryde was brought in as a replacement, opening in June 1972. The Medway Queen remained moored alongside, with both paddle steamers open to the public for a time. Owner, Alan Ridett said "For a time we ran them in tandem and could wine, dine and dance 1,000 people." However, the Medway Queen Club seems to have closed in the summer of 1974, leaving the Ryde Queen to continue on its own.

The Medway Queen fell into a state of severe dilapidation, but was bought in September 1977 by a trio of Kent businessmen for £10,000. When they tried to move her out of the marina, she sank just outside in the River Medina. There she remained until 1984, when she was refloated and taken to Chatham in Kent. After many years of uncertainty, she is now owned by the Medway Queen Preservation Society and is currently undergoing full restoration at Gillingham Pier.

=== Paddle Steamer Ryde ===
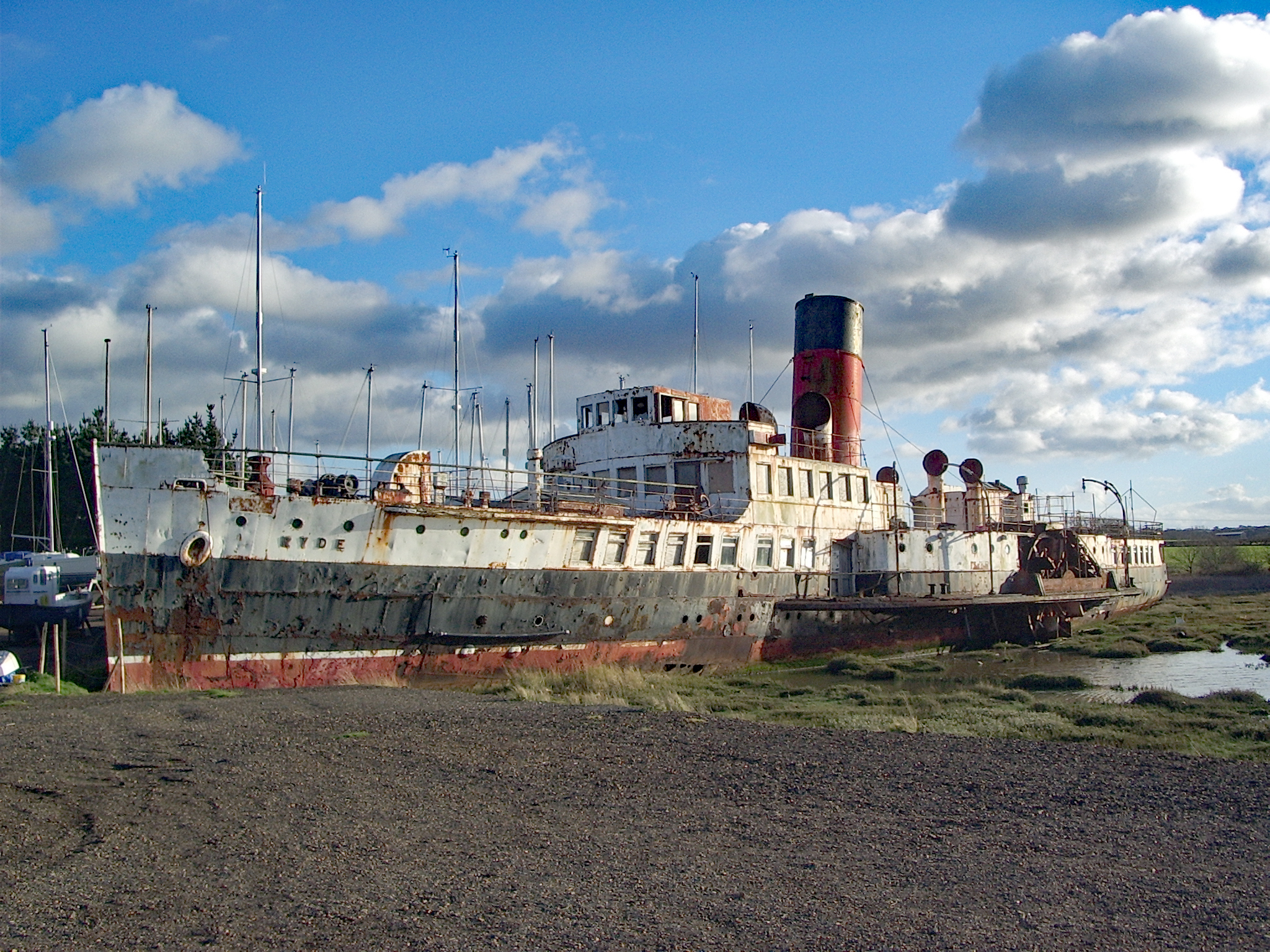
Paddle Steamer Ryde in 2005

The PS Ryde has been at Island Harbour for over 46 years, from September 1970 until the present day. She was built in 1937 by William Denny and Brothers of Dunbarton for Southern Railway (UK) and operated the Portsmouth to Ryde Pier passenger ferry service with her sister-ship, the PS Sandown. Originally costing £46,000, she is to be the only sea-going coal-fired paddle steamer left in the world. She is 216 feet long and displaces 603 tons.

At the outbreak of the Second World War, she was requisitioned by the Royal Navy and renamed HMS Ryde. She then spent two years as a minesweeper, before being converted to an anti-aircraft ship, patrolling the Thames Estuary. Her finest hour then came during the D-Day landings, when she was sent to the Normandy coast to assist in Operation Neptune. Her task was to take up position on the western side of the Mulberry Harbour at Omaha Beach and protect the invading US troops there by giving covering fire. At one stage, she was ordered to run herself aground if she did not have enough coal to return to England, but she did. She was also hit in the engine room by a shell, but it did not explode.

Following the war, she returned to her duties as a cross-Solent passenger ferry, being licensed to carry 1,011 passengers. In 1968, she was taken to the River Thames and chartered by Gilbey's Gin as a "Floating Gin Palace". A short film was made about this excursion by British Pathe News. The Ryde was finally withdrawn from service in August 1969.

Heading for the breakers yard, she was bought for £12,000 and saved by the Ridetts, who took her to Island Harbour in September 1970, to become its second floating restaurant and nightclub. After an extensive re-fit costing £60,000, she was officially opened as the "Ryde Queen Boatel" on 14 June 1972. At the same time, she was renamed from the Ryde to the Ryde Queen by Miss Carolyn Moore, the reigning Miss Great Britain. Her new interior enabled her to accommodate 35 guests in luxurious cabins and 100 people in her restaurant. She had an outside upper-deck bar, a quarter-deck dance floor and a lower deck "Boiler" lounge bar with a maple dance floor.

In August 1977, she was badly damaged by a mystery fire, which led to her temporary closure. However, she re-opened and carried on until 1989, when her deteriorating condition forced her to close for the last time. Since that time, she has continued to worsen and she is now in a very derelict state. In 2010, work was started to dismantle her, but this was stopped almost straight away for legal reasons.

Although many believe that she is now beyond repair, there is still a hope that something can be done to save her. An application was made to the Isle of Wight Council planning department on 11 June 2014 by the owners of Island Harbour Marina, for permission to retain her on site for a further three years. This was to allow time to evaluate the possibility; and to find the funding necessary to rebuild her. The application was approved by the council on 5 August 2014, guaranteeing her continued existence for at least another three years.

=== Paddle Steamer Kingswear Castle ===
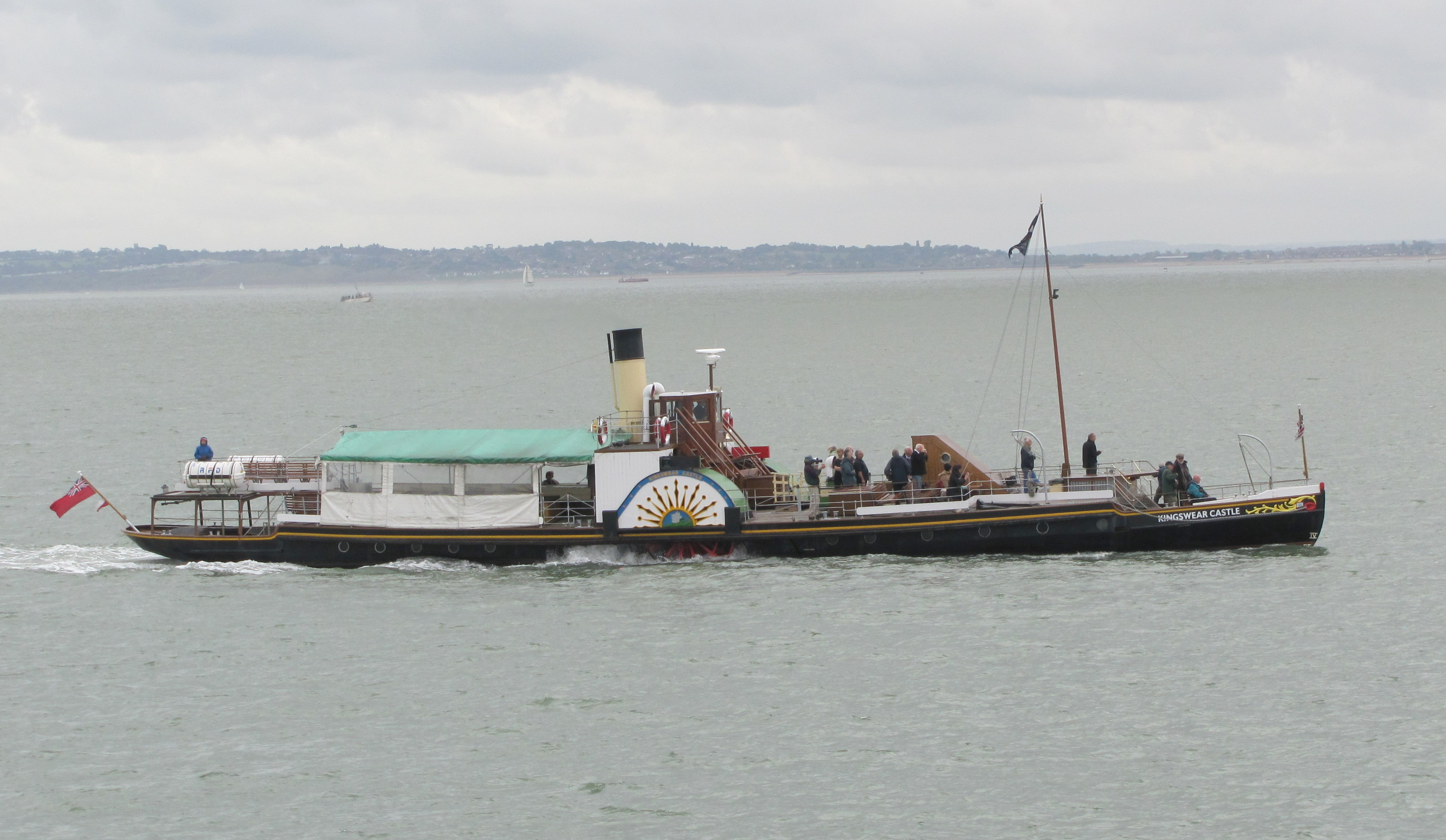
The PS Kingswear Castle in 2010

PS Kingswear Castle was built in 1924 by Philip and Son of Dartmouth, for service on the River Dart, between Totnes and Dartmouth. As a river-steamer, she was only 113 feet long, weighed 96 tons, but could carry 500 passengers. She is currently the last remaining operational coal-fired paddle steamer in the UK, but is not sea-going, like the PS Ryde. As with the PS Medway Queen and PS Ryde, the Kingswear Castle also saw service in World War II, being chartered to the United States Navy to carry stores and personnel.

After the war, she returned to the River Dart, where she continued her civilian career until finally being withdrawn from service in 1965. She was bought by the Paddle Steamer Preservation Society (PSPS) two years later and was chartered by them to the Medway Queen Marina in August 1967, to operate alongside the marina's other paddle steamer, the Medway Queen. Owner, Alan Ridett, thought that the Kingswear Castle would be an attractive addition to the marina and hoped that he would be able to use it for cruises along the River Medina. In May 1969, after an extensive mechanical overhaul, she took her first trip under her own steam since being withdrawn from service in 1965. A month later, she was running a cruise up the Beaulieu River.

However, only a year after that, in 1970, she was almost on the point of being scrapped, due to her over-all deteriorating condition. To save her, she left Island Harbour in June 1971, after a four-year stay and was moved to the River Medway. After many setbacks, she was finally restored in 1984 and returned to full passenger carrying service on the River Medway. There she stayed until 2012, when she returned to her original home on the River Dart and continues to work there, on charter to the Dartmouth Steam Railway and Riverboat Company.

=== Paddle Steamer Monarch ===
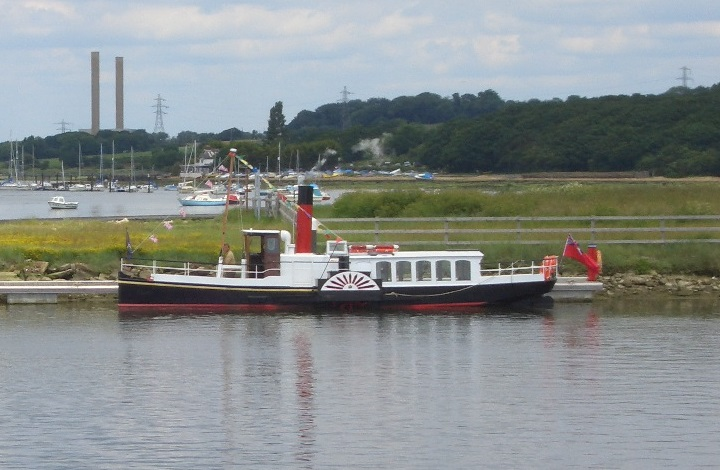
Island Harbour Monarch

In fact, another paddle steamer was also briefly located at Island Harbour. The modern PS Monarch was based there for three seasons from 2008 until 2010, offering excursions in the River Medina. At only 42 feet long, 8 feet wide and with a capacity for only 12 passengers, she is the world's smallest commercial paddle steamer.

The Monarch was designed and built by Brian Waters, who was a key volunteer in finally restoring the paddle steamer Kingswear Castle. It was a dream of his to construct his own paddle steamer from scratch. Construction was originally started in 1984, but it took him almost twenty years before she was finally finished, entering commercial service in 2003. She is powered by a 100-year-old compound steam engine, fed by an oil-fired boiler, which was originally used as a tar pump at Caerphilly gas works. This gives an operating speed of up to 6 knots.

Monarch originally worked the River Stour, but 2007 was when she was sold and moved to Island Harbour. In 2010, she was sold again, and moved to the River Tamar. Sold yet again in 2012, she is now running cruises along the River Frome, from Wareham Quay.

== The Pirate Ship ==
From the spring of 1984 until November 1987, there was another memorable and noteworthy vessel at Island Harbour. This was the 127 feet long, (sometimes quoted as 82 feet long), twin-masted Topsail Schooner, Nora-av-Ven. Also referred to as a Baltic Trader, she was built in 1825 and originally sailed out of Ven, Sweden. But, from the 1970s until she was finally broken up in 1999, she became known as "The Pirate Ship". This was because her owner brought her to the Isle of Wight and traded from her as a pirate-themed floating restaurant and museum. Previously she was owned by the actor, Edward Woodward. The Nora-av-Ven was reputed to have been used by real-life pirates at one stage of her chequered career.

During the 20th century she was at one time a floating dentists' surgery in Gibraltar; and in 1967 she was used as a floating stage by Bob Marley for a concert in Jamaica. She was also seen in the first series of the 1971 BBC drama series, The Onedin Line and another TV series about naturalist Charles Darwin. In 1973, Nora-av-Ven was almost wrecked when she struck rocks off Harwich.

In 1977, the Nora-av-Ven came to the Isle of Wight and the River Medina, where she began her new career as "The Pirate Ship" restaurant and museum. The restaurant treated its guests to a mock pirate meal and experience. Music would be provided in the form of sea shanties, played on an accordion.

From 1984, after leaving W A Souter & Son Marina in Cowes, The Pirate Ship traded from Island Harbour Marina, moored on the pontoon known as the Fuel Berth. Ultimately, after the marina was sold, the Pirate Ship departed Island Harbour in November 1987, temporarily going back to a berth in East Cowes.

The Pirate Ship finally ended up at Newport Quay in April 1988 and carried on trading there until July 1997, when her deteriorating condition forced her to close. Leaking more and more, she sank several times on her berth and had to be refloated. Her rotting main mast also snapped in 1995 and the masts had to be removed. In December 1998, she sank again and was never refloated. In April 1999, the 175-year-old Nora-av-Ven was finally broken up and removed by the Isle of Wight Council.
