= Binfield, Isle of Wight =

Coordinates: 50.720°N 1.270°W

Binfield
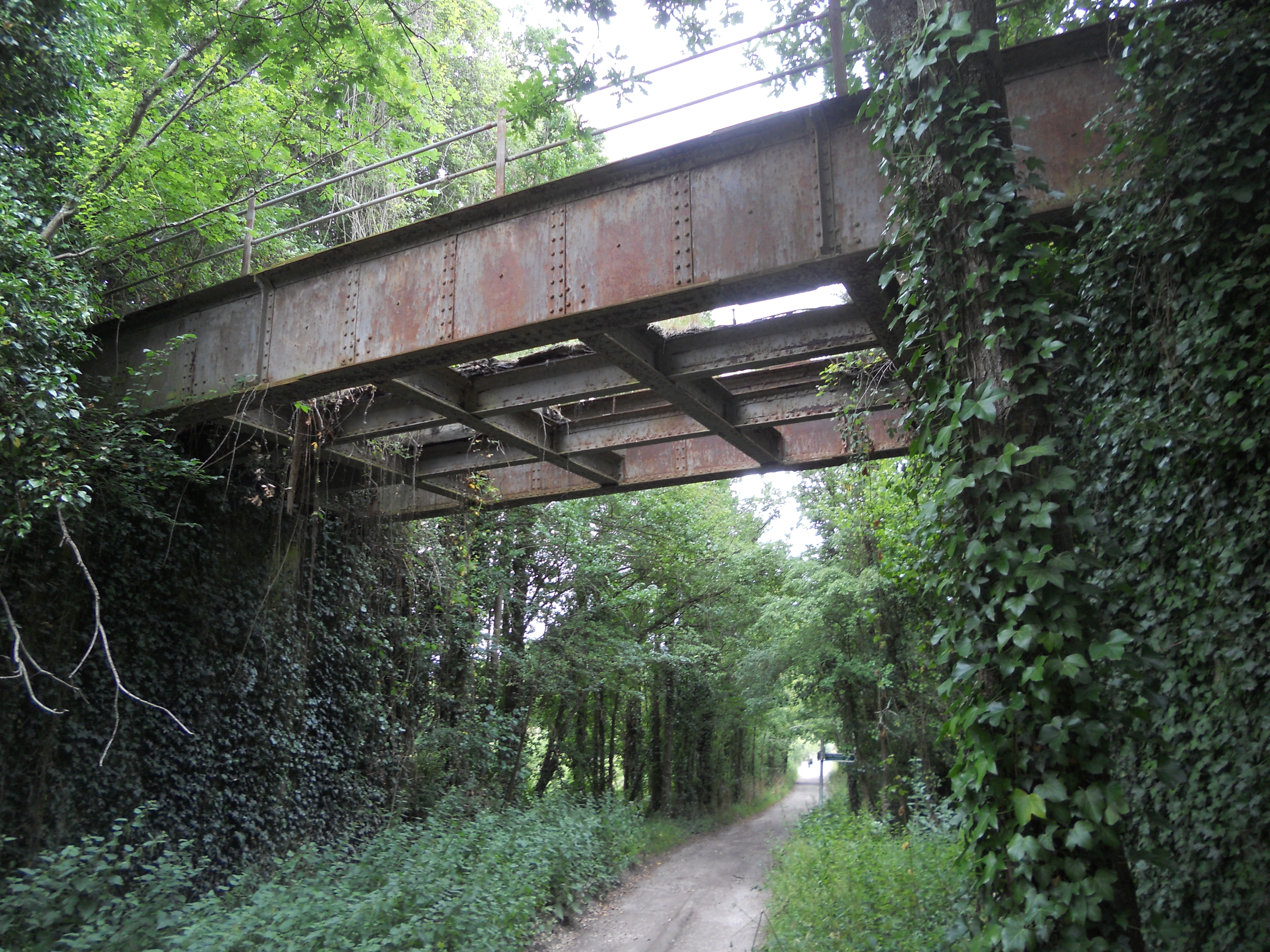
- An old railway bridge crossing farmland at Binfield

- Location within the Isle of Wight
- OS grid reference: SZ520911
- Unitary authority: Isle of Wight
- Ceremonial county: Isle of Wight
- Region: South East
- Country: England
- Sovereign state: United Kingdom
- Post town: NEWPORT
- Police: Hampshire and Isle of Wight
- Fire: Hampshire and Isle of Wight
- Ambulance: Isle of Wight
- UK Parliament: Isle of Wight West

Binfield is a hamlet on the Isle of Wight near Newport. It primarily lies along the A3054 road, which runs from Newport to East Cowes and Ryde.

The primary site of interest in Binfield is Island Harbour Marina, formerly known as Binfield Marina. The remaining highlights include a number of farms and houses, particularly those running along East Cowes Road.

In 2008, The People reported that electrician Arthur Reeder kept a collection of 190 Royal Mail post boxes on his four-acre property in Binfield.

== Name ==
The current name is unknown in origin, but the hamlet was previously known as Claybrooke (1851 census) Claybrook (1769) Cleybroc (1266) Cleibroc (~1200), meaning 'the clay brook' or 'the brook with high amounts of clay', from Old English clǣg and brōc. It referred to a small tributary of the River Medina.
