= PS Kingswear Castle =

1924 paddle steamer

Coordinates: 51°23′40″N 0°31′29″E

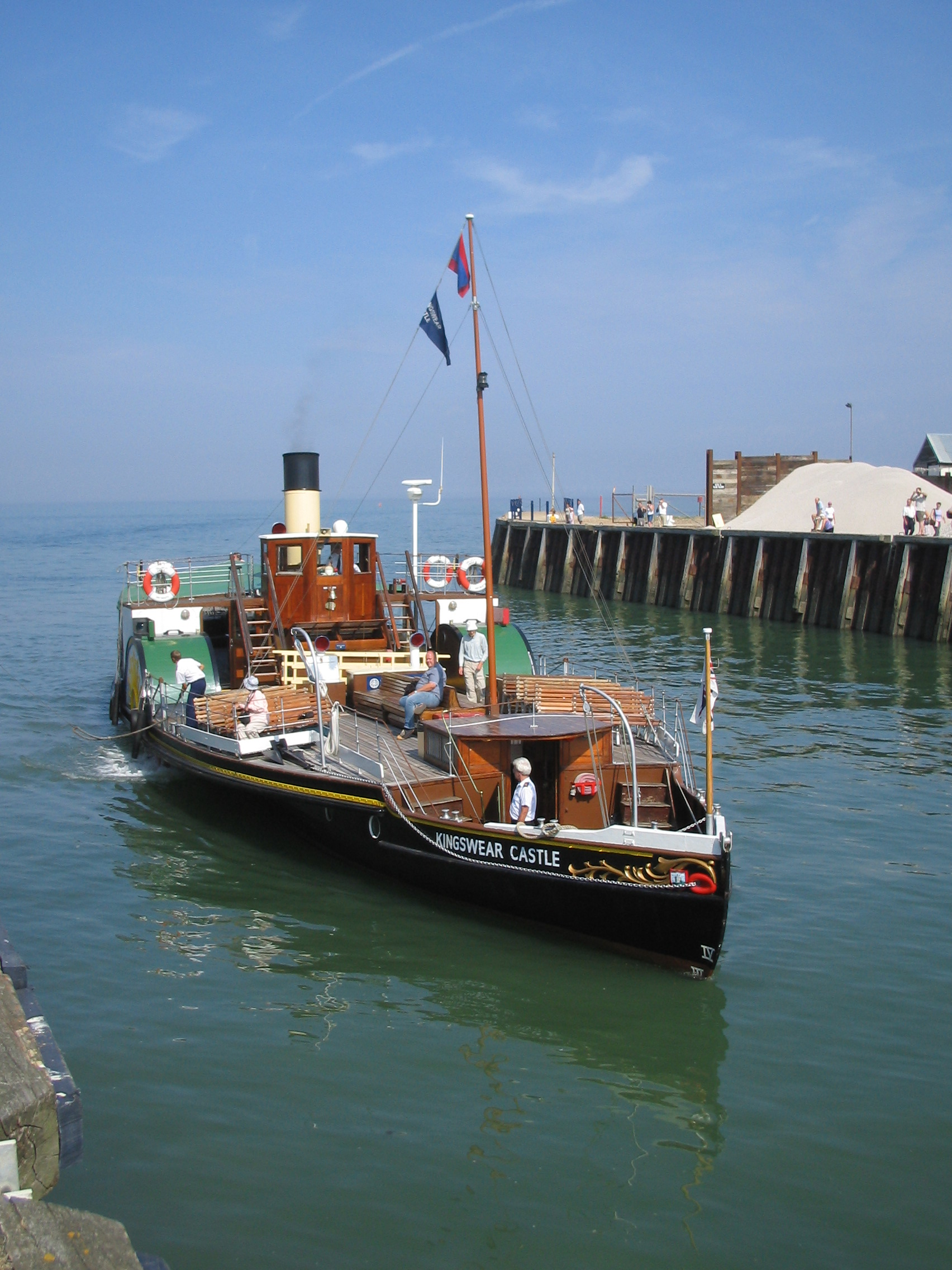
- PS Kingswear Castle in Whitstable Harbour

History

United Kingdom
- Name: PS Kingswear Castle
- Namesake: Kingswear Castle in Devon, UK
- Owner: River Dart Steamboat Company (1924); Paddle Steamer Preservation Society (1965)
- Operator: River Dart Steamboat Company (1924); Paddle Steamer Kingswear Castle Trust (1985); Dartmouth Steam Railway and Riverboat Company (2012)
- Route: River Dart (1924); River Medway and Thames (1985); River Dart (2013)
- Ordered: 1924
- Builder: Philip and Son, Dartmouth, UK
- Launched: 1924
- Identification: MMSI number: 235007618; Callsign: MCGH6
- Status: Active

General characteristics
- Type: Paddle steamer
- Length: 113.75 ft (34.67 m) LOA; 108.14 ft (32.96 m) LBP
- Beam: 17.43 ft (5.31 m)
- Draught: 3.43 ft (1.05 m)
- Propulsion: Compound Diagonal Steam engine (1904) built by Cox and Co of Falmouth

PS Kingswear Castle is a steamship. She is a coal-fired river paddle steamer, dating from 1924 with engines from 1904. After running summer excursions on the River Medway and the Thames for many years she returned to the River Dart in Devon in December 2012 to run excursions from 2013 onwards on the river she was built on and for. Kingswear Castle is listed as part of the National Historic Fleet of ships of "Pre-eminent National Significance".

== History ==
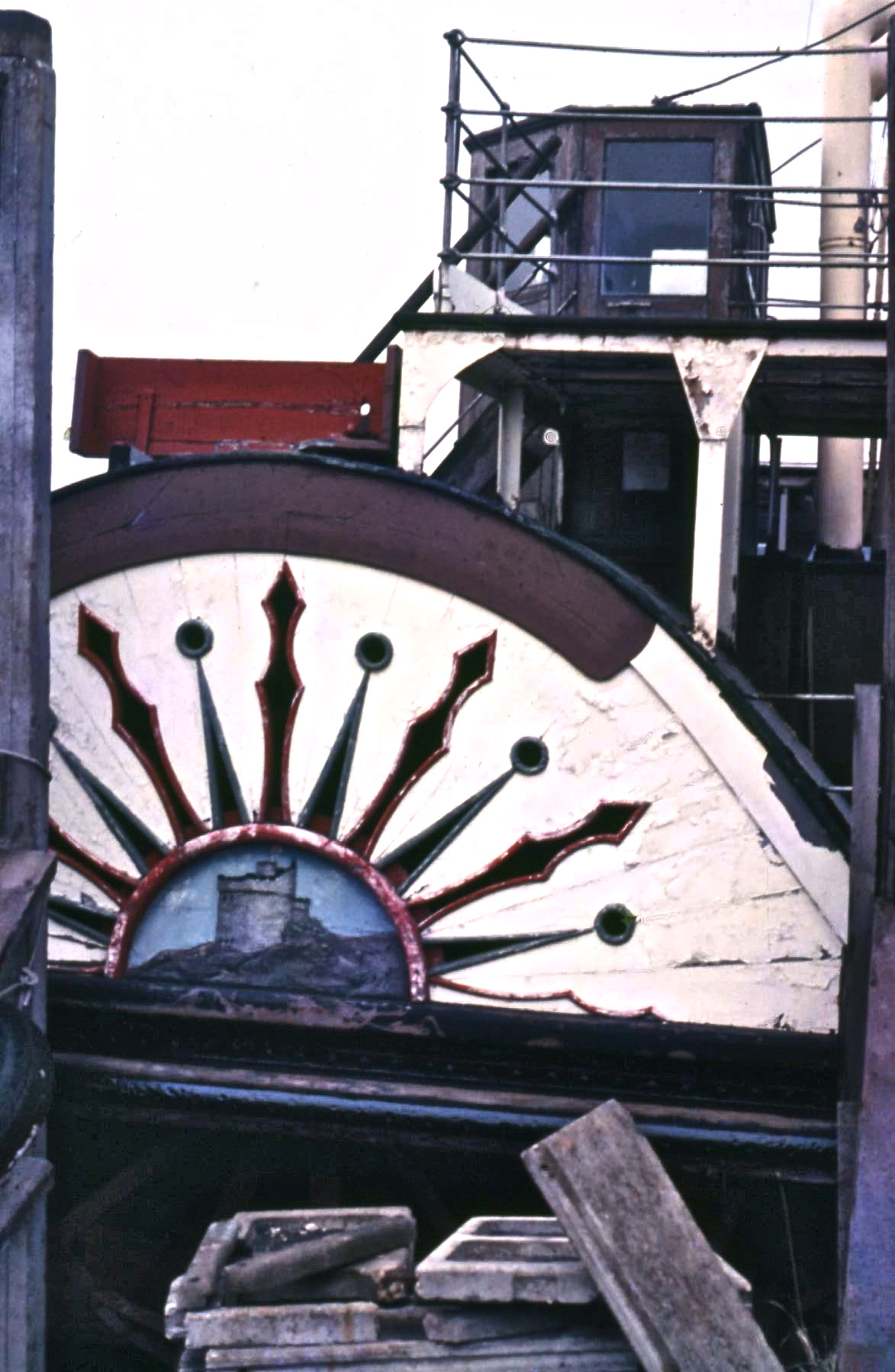
detail of paddle box, Kingswear Castle 28-4-1973 during restoration on a slipway at Medway Marina, Rochester.

The Kingswear Castle was built by Philip & Sons of Dartmouth in 1924 for service on the River Dart, following sister ships Compton Castle and Totnes Castle, and was operated by the River Dart Steamboat Co. Her predecessor of the same name from 1904 is now a rotted and barely recognisable hulk in the River Dart, but the engines were re-used in the current steamboat.

Kingswear Castle was chartered to the United States Navy during World War II, and was used for carrying stores and personnel at Dartmouth. In 1965 Kingswear Castle was withdrawn from service and became the first purchase of the Paddle Steamer Preservation Society (PSPS) two years later. She was then taken to the Isle of Wight and was moored at Island Harbour Marina from August 1967 to June 1971. However, due to her deteriorating condition, she was then taken to the River Medway.

After various difficulties and a great deal of restoration work she was finally brought into service again in 1985, and was operated by the Paddle Steamer Kingswear Castle Trust based at Chatham Historic Dockyard in Kent, in association with the PSPS.

On 18 December 2012 she returned to the River Dart again, under charter to the Dartmouth Steam Railway and Riverboat Company, to run passenger trips around Dartmouth Harbour and up river to Totnes.

== See also ==
- PS Waverley
- PS Wingfield Castle
- PS Medway Queen
- Paddle Steamer Preservation Society
