= New Belgica =

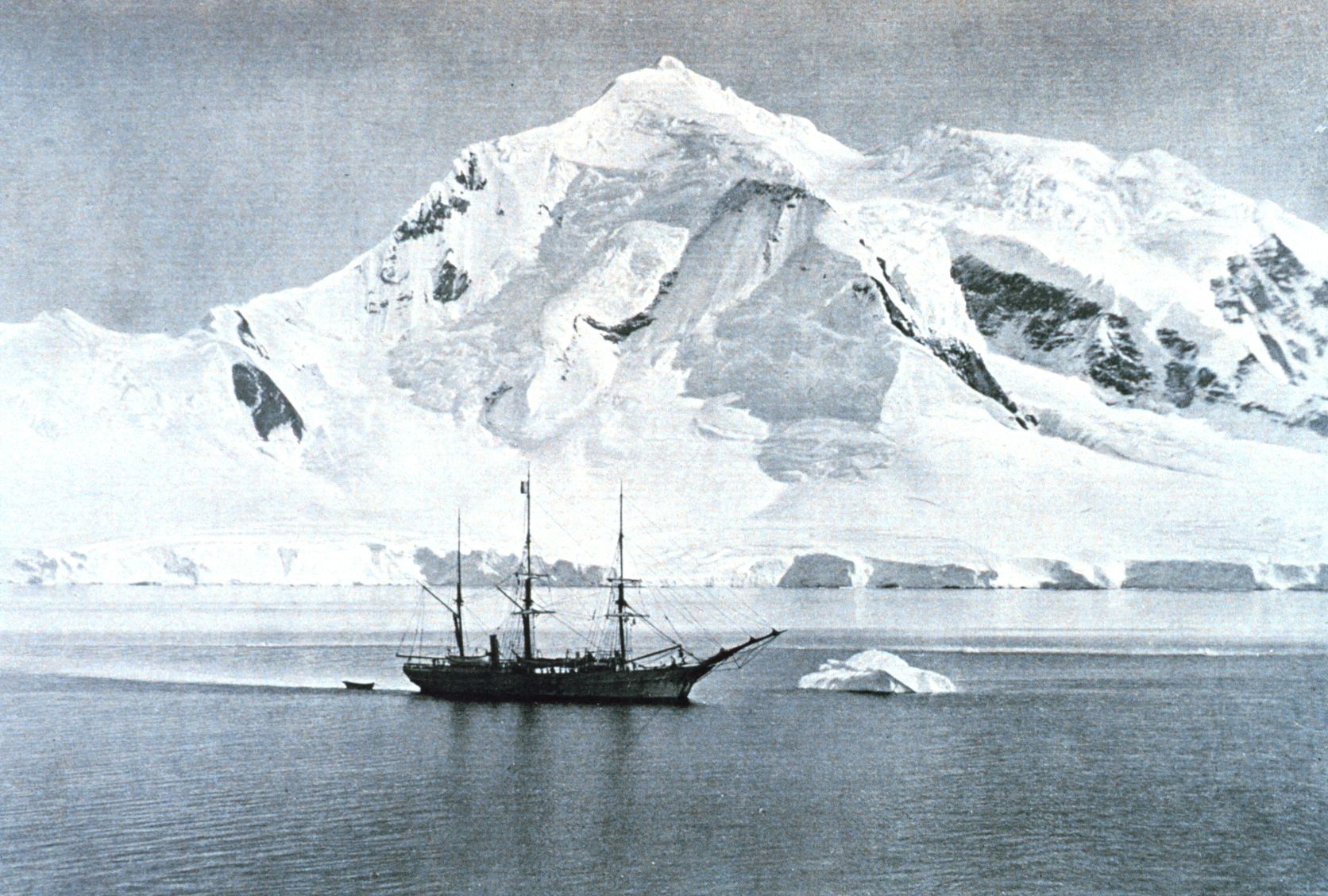
The BELGICA anchored at Mount William

The New Belgica is a replica of the RV Belgica (1884), a research vessel with a proud history.

== Replica ==
In 2006, the VZW New Belgica was formed with the intention of constructing a replica of Belgica. The project was officially launched on 9 September 2007 at De Steenschuit's yard in Boom, Antwerp by Kris Peeters, Minister-President of Flanders. Queen Paola is the project's patron. Construction was scheduled for completion in 2013.

From 2010 -2013 the project has been supported by the European Regional Development Fund's Echoes2c scheme. Steenschuits relocated their yard to Noeveren, in a major shipbuilding and brick making area. There came two significant setback that have changed the aims of the project. Firstly, the planned structural and spatial improvements for the area were stopped. The competent authorities refused to grant a certificate of seaworthiness to the new vessel demanding expensive and unpractical changes to the ship to bring her up to modern standards. The vessel has secured a place in the Port of Antwerp as a floating museum, adjacent to the historic dry-docks and the Red Star Line museum.

== See also ==
- PS Medway Queen
- Jean Bart
