= Paddle Steamer Preservation Society =

British charity and steamship preservation group

- Founded: 8 November 1959
- Founder: Dr Alan Robinson
- Registration no.: 298328 & SC037603
- Locations: Bristol Channel Branch, London & Home Counties Branch, North of England & North Wales Branch, Scottish Branch, Wessex & Dart Branch
- Members: 3,000
- Website: www.paddlesteamers.org

The Paddle Steamer Preservation Society (PSPS) is a United Kingdom-based registered charity and owner of two working paddle steamers; PS Kingswear Castle and PS Waverley.

In September 1959 a letter by Dr Alan Robinson appeared in The Daily Telegraph newspaper remarking on the rapid decline of the paddle steamer around the shores of the UK and soliciting support for a preservation project. Over the next month a number of letters of support appeared in the Telegraph and following a public meeting on 30 October 1959 the decision was made to form a society. The first meeting was held on 8 November 1959 in Southampton where the name "Paddle Steamer Preservation Society" was adopted, with Dr Alan Robinson as founder. Poet Laureate Sir John Betjeman held the position of Patron of the PSPS from 1960 until his death in 1984.

The Society acquired its first paddle steamer PS Kingswear Castle in 1967 and was given PS Waverley in 1974. Both have been extensively restored and are fully operational.

The Society membership has increased from the 15 persons present at the first meeting to over 3,000 members worldwide, the majority affiliated to one of five PSPS branches that cover the UK.

The PSPS Collection holds in excess of 50,000 objects ranging from posters, souvenirs and paintings through to fittings from long-departed paddle steamers.

In addition to owning two operational paddle steamers the Society also supports other paddle steamer projects including PS Maid of the Loch and PS Medway Queen.
