= PS Sandown =

Clyde-built paddle steamer (1934 to 1966)

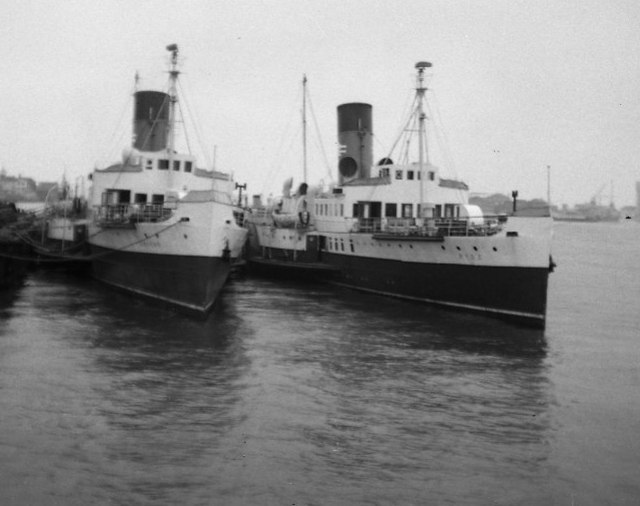
- Sandown (left) and Ryde at Portsmouth Harbour on 15 July 1965

History
- Name: PS Sandown
- Operator: 1934–1948: Southern Railway; 1948–1966: British Railways
- Port of registry: (United Kingdom)
- Builder: William Denny and Brothers, Dumbarton
- Cost: £39,850
- Yard number: 1272
- Launched: 1 May 1934
- Out of service: 16 July 1966
- Fate: Scrapped 1966

General characteristics
- Tonnage: 684 gross register tons (GRT)
- Length: 216 feet (66 m)
- Beam: 29.1 feet (8.9 m)
- Draught: 7 feet (2.1 m)
- Speed: 14.5 knots
- Capacity: 900 passengers

PS Sandown was a passenger vessel built for the Southern Railway in 1934 and later served with distinction in the Royal Navy during the Second World War.

== History ==
The ship was built by William Denny and Brothers in Dumbarton and launched on 1 May 1934 by Mrs E.J. Missenden, wife of the manager for the Southern Railway Company Docks at Southampton. Costing £39,850, she was one of two ships placed by the railway company, the other being Ryde. She was deployed on the Portsmouth to Ryde ferry service.

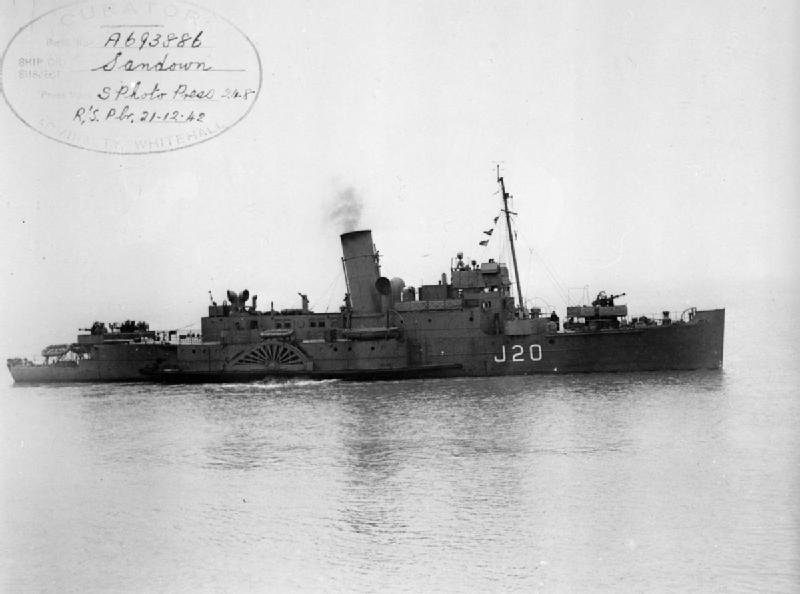
HMS Sandown in service as an anti-aircraft ship in December 1942.

At the outbreak of the Second World War, she was requisitioned by the Admiralty and converted to a minesweeper with the pennant number J.20, initially serving with the 10th Flotilla in the English Channel as the senior officer's vessel. On 27 May 1940, Sandown led the flotilla to the Dunkirk evacuation, returning with them on the following day and then operating independently. On 1 June, she rescued 250 men from a grounded drifter. The total number of men rescued by Sandown during the operation was 1,861. In 1942, she was reequipped as an anti-aircraft ship, later supporting the Normandy landings and the Battle of the Scheldt. She was returned to her owners in 1945.

She was acquired by British Railways in 1948. On 30 June 1954, she went to the rescue of her sister ship Ryde which had mechanical difficulties. The Sandown managed to secure a tow line and tow her to Portsmouth Harbour.

She was scrapped in 1966.
