= William Denny and Brothers =

Scottish shipbuilding company, 1840 to 1963

- Type: Private
- Industry: Shipbuilding
- Founded: 1840; 186 years ago
- Defunct: 1963; 63 years ago
- Fate: Liquidation
- Headquarters: Dumbarton, UK

William Denny and Brothers Limited, often referred to simply as Denny, was a Scottish shipbuilding company.

== History ==
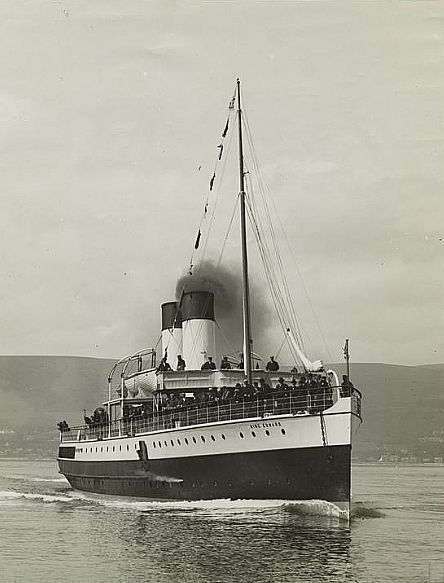
TS King Edward (1901) on sea trial

The shipbuilding interests of the Denny family date back to William Denny (born 1779), for whom ships are recorded being built in Dumbarton as far back as 1811 such as the sailing sloop Alpha. By 1823 the company name had changed to William Denny & Son. The first ship it built under this name was the paddle steamer Superb. From 1845 the company became Denny Brothers (this being William jnr, Alexander and Peter), and in 1849 the firm was reconstituted as William Denny & Brothers, this being William, James and Peter Denny.

Although the Denny yard was situated near the junction of the River Clyde and the River Leven, the yard was on the Leven. The founder developed the company's interests in ship owning and operation with interests in the British & Burmese Steam Navigation Company, the Irrawaddy Flotilla Company and La Platense Flotilla.

The Company built all types of ships but were particularly well known as producers of fine cross-channel steamships and ferries. It was a pioneer in the development of the ship's stabiliser in conjunction with Edinburgh-based Brown Brothers & Company. In 1913 the Channel steamer Paris was one of the first ships to use geared turbine engines utilising new Michell tilting-pad fluid bearing. It also undertook experimental work in hovercraft and helicopter-type aircraft.

A marine engineering company, also based in Dumbarton, was formed by Peter Denny, John Tulloch and John McAusland in 1850 as Tulloch & Denny. In 1862 the company was renamed Denny & Co. The company manufactured a wide range of types of marine engines and was absorbed into William Denny & Brothers in 1918.

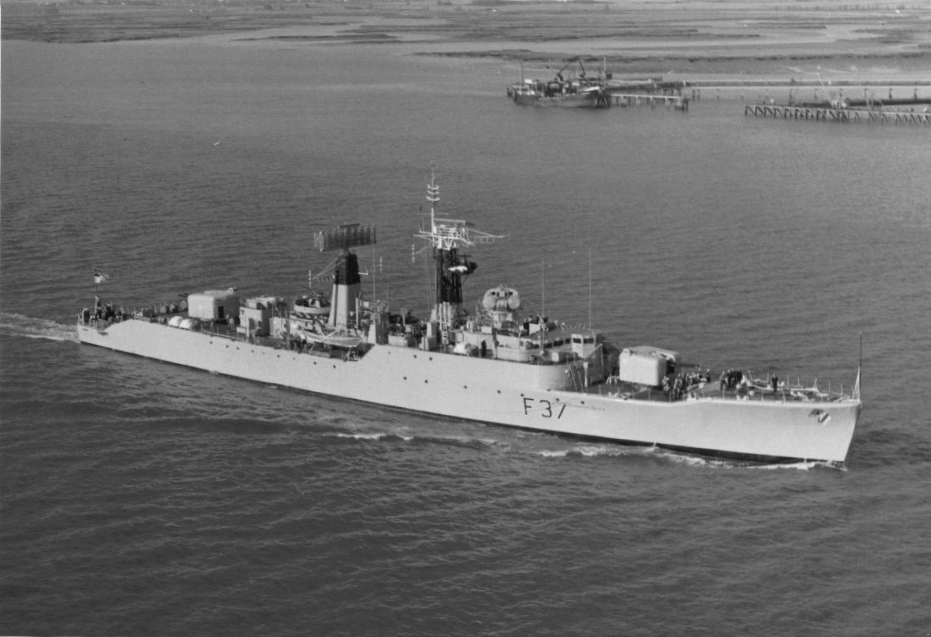
Type 41 frigate HMS Jaguar (1957)

Dennys were always innovators and were one of the first commercial shipyards in the world to have their own experimental testing tank: this is now open to the public as a museum. William Denny & Company went into voluntary liquidation in 1963.

== Denny ship model experiment tank ==
Inspired by the work of eminent naval architect William Froude, Denny's completed the world's first commercial example of a ship testing tank in 1883. The facility was used to test models of various ships and explored various propulsion methods, including propellers, paddles and vane wheels. Experiments were carried out on models of the Denny-Brown stabiliser and the Denny hovercraft to gauge their feasibility. Tank staff also carried out research and experiments for other companies: Belfast-based Harland and Wolff decided to fit a bulbous bow on the liner Canberra after successful model tests in the Denny Tank. After the Denny yard closed, the test tank facility was taken over by Vickers Shipbuilding and Engineering Limited and used for the testing of submarines until the early 1980s.

Re-opened as part of the Scottish Maritime Museum in 1982, it retains many of its original features, including the 100m long ship testing tank. The towing carriage is still in working order and is demonstrated from time to time, but all instrumentation has been removed and so the tank cannot currently be used for hydrodynamic research and testing.

== Denny-built vessels ==
Some significant Denny-built vessels include the following, listed chronologically by year:

- SS Marjory (1814) for James McCubbin, first steamship on east coast, first on Thames and first to cross the English Channel
- SS Greenock (1815) for James McCubbin, first steamship in Belfast and first on River Mersey
- Cutty Sark (1869); completed by Denny's after the liquidation of her contracted builders, Scott & Linton; preserved in a dry dock at Greenwich, London
- SS Parthia (1870); an ocean liner built for the Cunard Line. Existed under multiple roles and ownerships for over 80 years before finally being scrapped in Japan.
- SS Coya (1892); a Lake Titicaca steamer and now a floating restaurant
- SS Seaford (1893) A cross-channel ferry which sank in 1895 after collision with another LBSCR vessel, the cargo ship Lyon.
- SS Sussex (1896) A cross-channel ferry, built as an almost exact replacement for SS Seaford. It was severely damaged by a torpedo from a German U-boat in 1916. At least 50 passengers died.
- SS Sir Walter Scott (1899); excursion steamer on Loch Katrine, Scotland
- SY Lysistrata (1900): luxury steam yacht for James Gordon Bennett
- TS King Edward (1901); excursion steamer and the first commercial ship powered by steam turbines
- SS Brighton (1903) A cross-channel ferry which was involved in a collision with the windjammer Preußen 8 nautical miles (15 km) south of Newhaven, resulting in its total loss.
- SS Otaki (1908); a refrigerated cargo liner that was the first commercial ship to be powered by a combination of reciprocating steam engines and a low-pressure steam turbine
- HMS Engadine (1911); a cross-channel packet boat that was converted into a seaplane tender in 1914, sold to Filipino owners in 1933 and sunk by a mine in 1941
- Delta King (1924–1926); currently a hotel, theatre, and restaurant in Sacramento, California
- Delta Queen (1924–1926); currently a hotel at Chattanooga, Tennessee
- TS Queen Mary (1933); A Clyde turbine steamer that was once a floating restaurant in London. Now undergoing restoration next to the Glasgow Science Centre.
- PS Caledonia (1934); a Clyde paddle steamer that was converted into a minesweeper in 1939, a pub and restaurant in 1969 and was destroyed by fire in 1980
- PS Ryde (1937); built for the Southern Railway, and the world's last coal-fired sea-going paddle steamer when withdrawn from service in 1969. There were hopes to preserve the ship at the Island Harbour Marina on the Isle of Wight, but she is now planned to be dismantled.
- MV The Second Snark (1938); a former Denny-owned tug and tender on the Clyde
- MV Lymington (1938); an Isle of Wight ferry that in 1974 became the Clyde ferry MV Sound of Sanda
- MV Royal Iris (1950); a former Mersey ferry berthed at Woolwich, London
- MV Fenerbahçe (1953); a former passenger ferry, now a museum ship in Istanbul, Turkey
- HMS Jaguar (1957); Leopard class frigate, now BNS Ali Haider in Bangladesh Navy
- GMV Aramoana (1961) Last vessel built by William Denny and Brothers. She was a roll-on/roll-off road/rail ferry built for New Zealand Railways Department.

== Company flag ==
The company's flag consisted of a blue elephant against a white field. This image was taken from the civic arms of Dumbarton, and it also served to symbolise the strength and solidity of the company's products.

== See also ==
- Scottish Maritime Museum
