= PS Medway Queen =

Paddle steamer, little ship of Dunkirk

Coordinates: 51°23′53″N 0°33′18″E

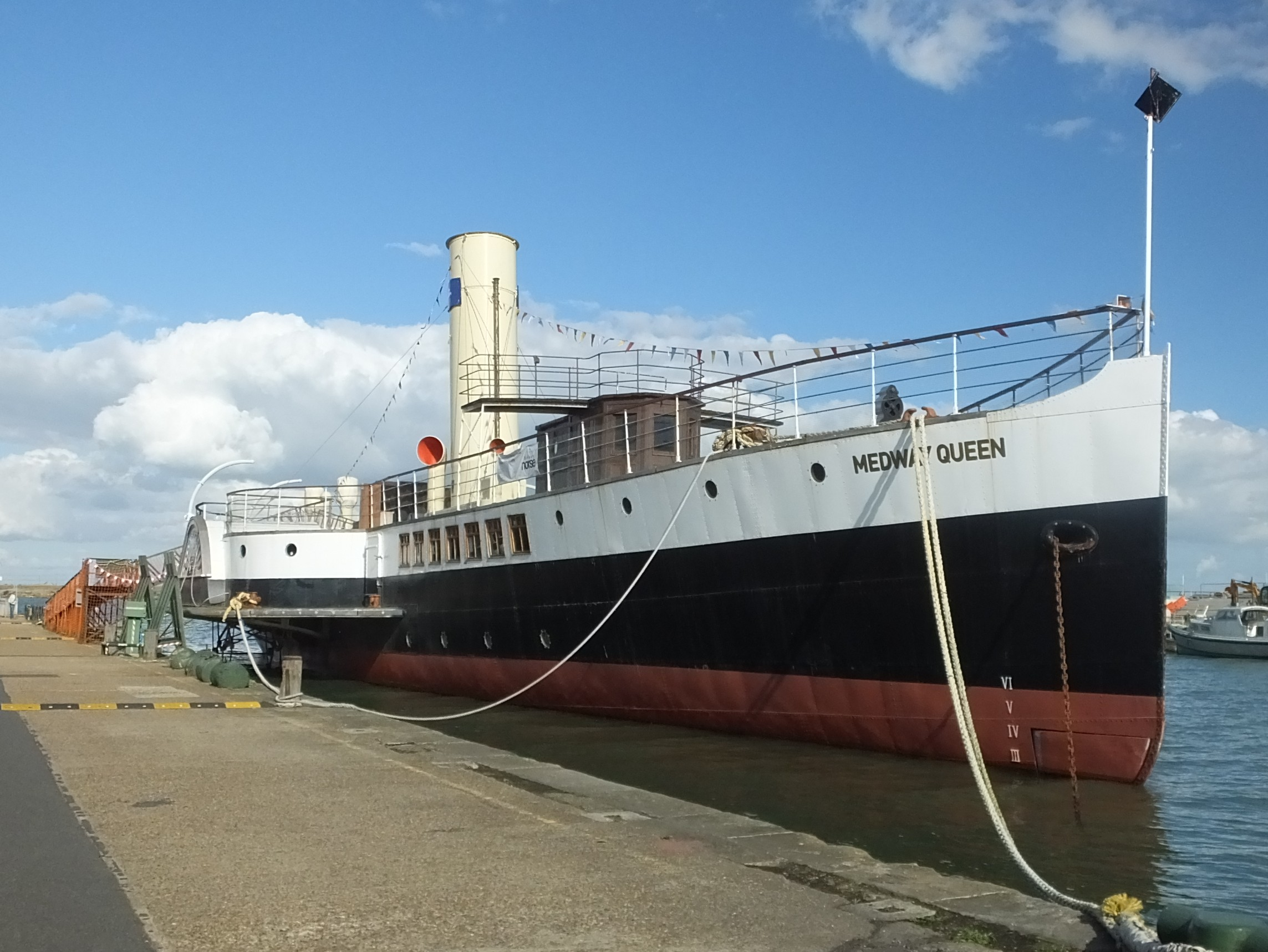
- PS Medway Queen, Gillingham Pier 2016

History

United Kingdom
- Name: Medway Queen
- Owner: New Medway Steam Packet Company (1924–64); (Nightclub, Ryde) (1964–85); Medway Queen Preservation Society (from 1985)
- Port of registry: (United Kingdom) Rochester
- Builder: Ailsa Shipbuilding Company, Troon, Scotland
- Yard number: PS 388
- Launched: Wednesday 23 April 1924
- In service: 1924
- Out of service: 1964
- Identification: UK Official Number 148361; Code letters GGNG (1944– ); Pennant Number N 48 (1939–42); Pennant Number J48 (1942–47)
- Nickname(s): Heroine of Dunkirk
- Status: Under restoration as a museum ship
- Notes: Sea trials 1924

General characteristics
- Class & type: Paddle steamer
- Tonnage: 316 GRT
- Displacement: 316 tonnes.
- Length: 179 ft 9 in (54.79 m)
- Beam: 24 ft 2 in (7.37 m) hull; 50 ft (15.24 m) over paddle frames
- Draught: 7 ft 8 in (2.34 m)
- Installed power: 76 hp (57 kW) Scotch type boiler 11 feet long, fitted with triple furnaces feeding Ailsa built compound diagonal steam engine. Coal fired when built, converted to oil fired by Wallsend Engineering in 1938, built by Ailsa
- Propulsion: Paddles
- Speed: 13 knots (24 km/h) at 45rpm cruising; 15 knots (28 km/h) at 55rpm maximum speed
- Armament: 1 × 12-pounder gun, 2 × machine guns (HMS Medway Queen)

The PS Medway Queen is a paddle driven steamship, the only mobile estuary paddle steamer left in the United Kingdom. She was one of the "little Ships of Dunkirk", making a record seven trips and rescuing 7,000 men in the evacuation of Dunkirk.

She was the subject of a £1.8 million National Lottery Heritage Memorial Fund grant to restore her hull. By 2014, her hull had been reconstructed and she is berthed at Gillingham Pier on the River Medway as of 2022. In 2024, she celebrated her centenary.

== History ==
PS Medway Queen was built by the Ailsa Shipbuilding Company at Troon, Scotland, in 1924 for service on the River Medway and in the Thames Estuary. Trialled on the River Clyde, she was delivered to be part of the "Queen Line" fleet of the New Medway Steam Packet Company based at Rochester, Kent. She steamed on routes from Strood and Chatham, to Sheerness, Herne Bay and Margate in Kent, and to Clacton and Southend in Essex. The novelist William Matthew Scott was one of the earliest passengers on the Herne Bay–Southend route.

On 3 August 1929, Medway Queen collided with Southend Pier, Essex, and suffered extensive damage to her bows.

After attending the Coronation Fleet Review for King George VI at Spithead, Medway Queen was converted to oil-fired steaming by Wallsend Slipway & Engineering Company in 1937.

=== World War II ===
Requisitioned by the Royal Navy on 9 September 1939, her first task was evacuating Kent children from Gravesend to East Anglia. She was refitted at the shipyard of the General Steam Navigation Company in Deptford Creek as a minesweeper, her stern being modified to take sweeping gear, being fitted with a 12-pounder gun and two machine guns, and allocated pennant number J 48 (N 48). She served for the duration of World War II in the 10th Minesweeping Flotilla, patrolling the Strait of Dover and the English Channel.

In May 1940 Operation Dynamo was launched to rescue retreating British Army soldiers from Dunkirk in northern France. HMS Medway Queen became part of the flotilla of little ships. She left with paddle steamers Sandown, Thames Queen, Gracie Fields, Queen of Thanet, PS Princess Elizabeth, Laguna Belle and Brighton Belle. She made seven crossings.

On her first trip, approximately 600 soldiers were taken off De Panne beach in lifeboats and ferried to the ship. On her return to Dover, her arrival coincided with an air raid. She shot down a German aircraft outside the harbour. The Brighton Belle ran over sunken wreckage and began to sink. All of her passengers and crew were rescued by the Medway Queen without loss of life and, heavily overloaded, she made the harbour.

On her second trip she took about 450 soldiers directly off the beach; this required more skill, but was much faster. Soldiers used a technique with oily bags to conceal their distinctive wash from patrolling aircraft. On later trips, the Medway Queen penetrated the damaged Dunkirk port and took off men from a concrete jetty or mole. Men were discharged at Ramsgate rather than Dover, where the vessel was fuelled and reprovisioned.

On Monday 3 June Vice Admiral Ramsey gave the order that all ships were to leave Dunkirk by 2.30 the following morning. This was the Medway Queen's seventh trip. She was at the mole in Dunkirk when a destroyer moored astern of her was driven forwards by an explosion and smashed her starboard paddle box, she sustained considerable damage. Medway Queen limped back to Dover with 400 French soldiers on board. On arriving back at Dover the crew of the Medway Queen discovered that the Admiralty had reported their ship as having been sunk (news which was reported throughout the UK); the Admiralty published a correction the following morning.

Her crew gained seven awards for gallantry – two Distinguished Service Crosses, three Distinguished Service Medals and two mentions in dispatches – having made seven crossings and rescued 7,000 men. In view of this remarkable achievement in rescuing so many Allied troops from France, she earned the title of "The Heroine of Dunkirk". After repairs in Portsmouth Dockyard, she returned to minesweeping duties, and in 1942 she was converted to a minesweeping training ship, serving out the war in this capacity, and was returned to her owners in January 1946.

=== Return to service ===
Rebuilt by Thornycrofts of Southampton in 1946, she returned to civilian service with New Medway Steam Packet Company for the 1947 season. Medway Queen attended the 1953 Coronation Fleet Review at Spithead.

She made her last sailing on 8 September 1963, and was scheduled to be scrapped in Belgium. The Belgian ship-breaker, upon discovering that the vessel he was expecting to break up was "The Heroine of Dunkirk", declined to continue (it is reported that he felt that no one should dare to destroy such a gallant and important little ship). The Daily Mail campaigned to save her.

=== Use as nightclub ===
Having been saved from scrapping, Medway Queen was eventually sold for use as a nightclub and marina clubhouse, and was moored at the Medway Queen Marina (now known as the Island Harbour Marina) on the Isle of Wight. The club opened in 1966. In 1970, a larger ship, PS Ryde, renamed as Ryde Queen, joined Medway Queen at the marina site, also operating as a nightclub. The two premises operated alongside one another for a period, until the Medway Queen was eventually closed and fell into disrepair.

=== Preservation ===
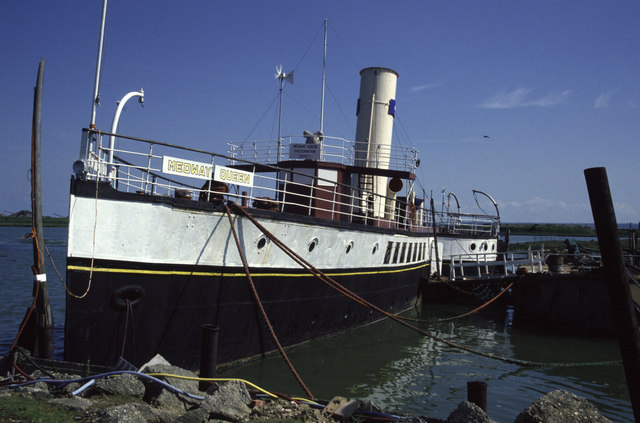
In 1994, the PS Medway Queen in Damhead Creek, Kingsnorth.

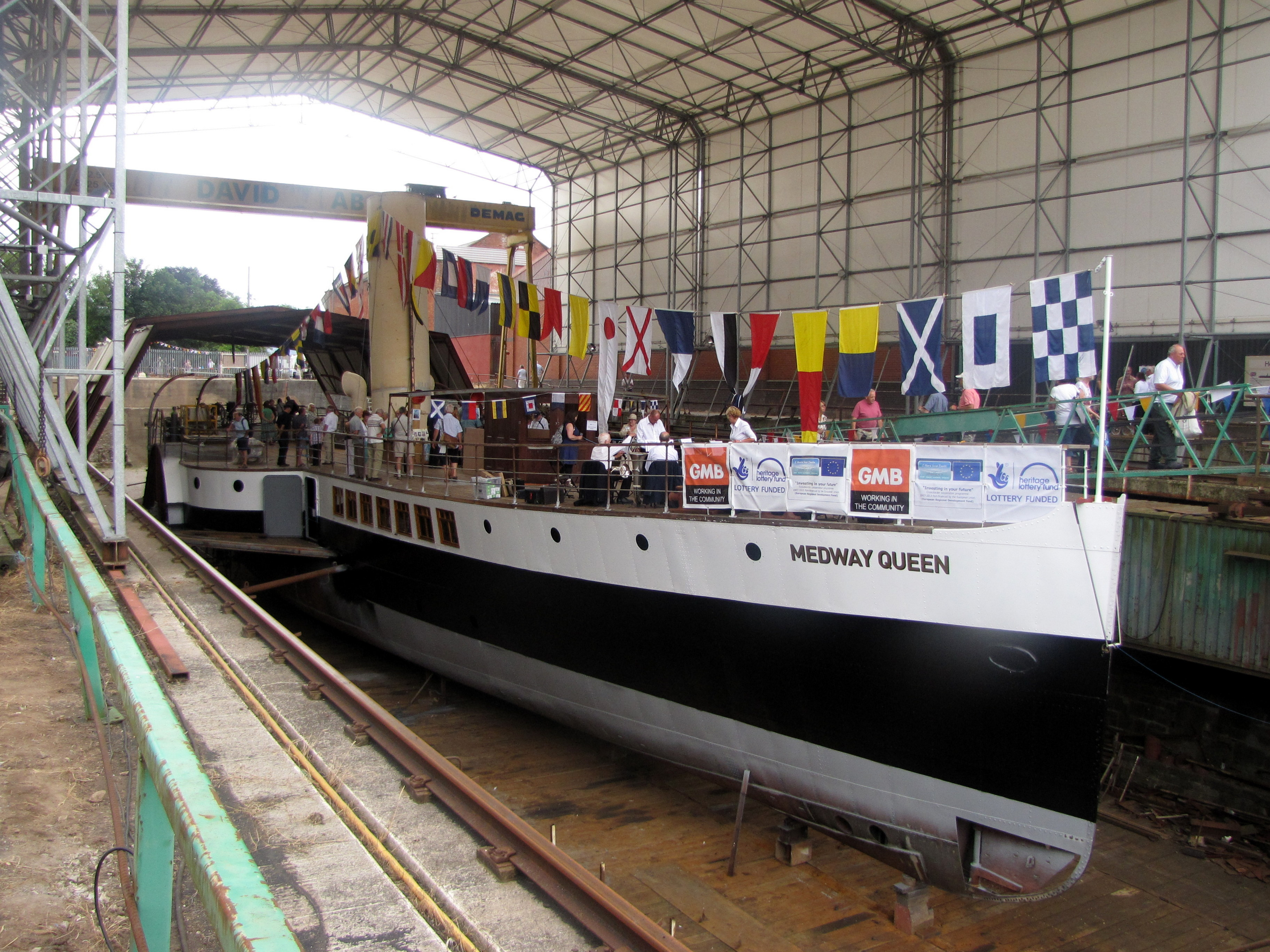
The PS Medway Queen in the Albion Dry Dock, Bristol on her rededication on 27 July 2013, during the Bristol Harbour Festival

In 1978 the Medway Queen was bought by private owners with the aim of preserving her. She was moved out of the marina to the adjacent River Medina, but sank in the river when the hull sprang a leak. There she remained, in a state of increasing deterioration, until in 1984 she was salvaged, moved to Cowes at the river's mouth, and thence towed back to Chatham in Kent on a salvage barge. In 1985 the Medway Queen Preservation Society formed, with the intention of preserving the historic ship.

In 1987 she was moved to Damhead Creek, Kingsnorth on the Hoo Peninsula, but the trust lacked funds to bring her back to service, and struggled to preserve the structure. After a series of near disasters, in 2006 the National Lottery Heritage Memorial Fund agreed a £1.8 million funding package to restore her structure, subject to the society raising £225,000. Although the funds were raised, neither the insurance company nor marine engineers were confident that her hull was seaworthy and able to sustain lifting on to a pontoon. In October 2006, the Trust agreed to the deconstruction of the hull, and salvageable pieces were moved to Gillingham Pier (and a National Lottery funded warehouse) in Chatham Dockyard, in preparation of the hull being professionally restored to seaworthy condition.

In October 2008, the society signed a contract with David Abels Shipbuilders to restore the hull at the Albion Dry Dock in Bristol, using plate riveting. Work began in April 2009 and was due to be completed in the summer of 2010. On 27 July 2013 the ship was rededicated. Plans were to float her out of the Albion Dock during the summer of 2013 and tow her back to Gillingham for a reception on 2 November.

The tow home to Gillingham using the tug Christine started from Bristol on 24 October 2013. Weather conditions meant they were held up at Avonmouth until 15 November when the wind abated sufficiently, and the tow around Land's End and through the English Channel continued in safety. The tug and tow finally arrived on the River Medway on Monday 18 November 2013. Due mainly to tidal restriction, the Medway Queen was buoyed in Saltpan Reach until high tide the following day. On 19 November the Medway Queen made the final leg of her journey to her new home at Gillingham Pier, guided by tug master Alan Pratt, with the ship welcomed by a large crowd and TV crews.

== Medway Queen at Ramsgate ==
In July 2021 the Medway Queen was towed to the Royal Harbour, Ramsgate for a major refurbishment, including repairs to the paddle wheels, hull and new handrails, before returning to Gillingham.

In 2025 it was announced that, for about eleven days in May, the Medway Queen would be a centrepiece at Ramsgate harbour during the 85th Anniversary of Operation Dynamo. She was expected to see off around 70 Little Ships, accompanied by naval warships, which planned to cross the Channel to Dunkirk on 21 May, and to welcome their return to Ramsgate on 26 May, weather permitting.

== Cultural references ==
The ship features in the 1964 Ken Russell film French Dressing.

== Official number and code letters ==
Official Numbers provided, on a national basis, a unique identifier for a ship, regardless of change of name. Medway Queen had the UK Official Number 148361.

She used the Code Letters GGNG between about 1944 and 1950.

== Timeline ==
- 1924 – built Troon, Scotland, by the Ailsa Yard for service on the River Medway and the Thames Estuary. Trialled on the River Clyde
- 1925 – worked on River Medway and the Thames Estuary, part of the "Queen Line" fleet of the New Medway Steam Packet Company based at Rochester, Kent
- 1937 – attended the Coronation Review for George VI at Spithead
- 1938 – converted by Wallsend Engineering from coal to oil burning, by Wallsend Engineering
- 1939 – carried children evacuated from Kent to East Anglia. Joined Royal Navy as minesweeper No J 48 (N 48), serving for the duration of the war in the 10th minesweeping flotilla in the English Channel
- 1940 – became part of the flotilla of ships evacuating British Army soldiers from Dunkirk during Operation Dynamo. After making seven trips (the record number of crossings by any merchant navy ship involved in the evacuation), she rescued over 7,000 men, gaining for the ship's crew seven awards for gallantry, and shot down three enemy aircraft. At one time during the evacuation, she was overdue and was thought to have been lost with all hands and troops – but she eventually arrived back at Dover, ready to return to France for more troops. The efforts of the ship and her crew earned the paddle steamer the title of "Heroine of Dunkirk"
- 1946 – rebuilt by Thorneycrofts of Southampton
- 1947 – returned to civilian service with New Medway Steam Packet Company
- 1953 – attended the Coronation Review for Queen Elizabeth II at Spithead
- 1963 – taken out of service, with the possibility of being broken up, but the Belgian shipbreaker declined to break up the "Heroine of Dunkirk"
- 1964 – sold, and later opened as a nightclub on the Isle of Wight
- 1970s – replaced by the larger PS Ryde and moved to the River Medina, but sank when the hull sprang a leak
- 1984 – raised and towed back to the River Medway on a pontoon by new owners
- ???? – abandoned and sank again, while moored against the wall of Chatham Dockyard
- 1985 – the Medway Queen Preservation Society formed, with the intention of preserving the ship
- 1987 – raised and moved to Damhead Creek, Kingsnorth on the Hoo Peninsula
- 2006 – the National Lottery Heritage Memorial Fund agreed a £1.8 million funding package to restore the structure, subject to the Society raising £225,000
- 2006 – deconstructed, as hull considered both unseaworthy and of sustaining lifting onto a pontoon. The hull and salvageable pieces were moved to Chatham Dockyard
- 2009 – restoration began in April, with new hull to be constructed at Albion Shipyard, Bristol.
- 2011 – Visitors' Centre opened at Gillingham Pier, funded by the European Heroes2c project with sister projects Association Tourville and de Steenschuit
- 2013 – new hull entered the River Medway at Sheerness under tow from Bristol on 18 November 2013
