= Jean-Bart =

1900s French automobile

The Jean-Bart was a French automobile manufactured in 1907 only. Successor to the Prosper-Lambert, the company built shaft-driven cars, single-cylinders of 9 hp and fours of 16 hp and 40 hp.
