= Jean Bart (2002) =

Coordinates: 50.9864°N 2.1177°E

History

France
- Name: Jean Bart
- Namesake: Jean Bart
- Owner: Association Tourville
- Builder: Gravelines, France
- Laid down: 2002
- Status: Under construction

General characteristics
- Tonnage: 1400
- Length: 57 m (187 ft)
- Beam: 15 m (49 ft)
- Height: 17 m (56 ft)
- Draught: 6 m (20 ft)
- Armament: 84 gun, Premier ship of the line

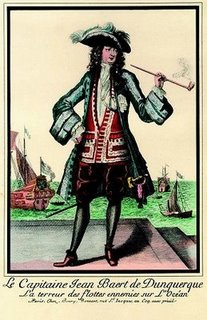
The Corsaire Jean Bart, a native of Dunkirk

Jean Bart is the name given to the replica of a 1670, 84-gun, ship-of-the-line, that is being constructed by the Association Tourville at Gravelines, Dunkirk, to the plans of the seventeenth century ship builder Colbert. It has European funding through the Heroes2c programme.

== Jean Bart, the corsaire ==
Jean Bart was a native of Dunkirk (Dunkerque).

== The project ==
The project is being managed by the Association Tourville. The keel of the ship was laid down in 2002, and it expected that it will take 20 years to complete. It uses traditional seventeenth century open air ship building techniques and it is hoped to preserve these skills for another generation. The ship is being built next to the Basin Vauban, in Gravelines, France.

From 2010 to 2013 it had the support of the European Development Fund's Interreg IV, Heroes2c scheme.

== See also ==
- Medway Queen, also funded by Heroes2c
- New Belgica, also funded by Heroes2c
- Hermione (2014), reproduction of the 1779 Hermione.
