= PS Ryde =

Clyde-built paddle steamer (1937 to 1989)

Coordinates: 50°43′28″N 1°16′48″W

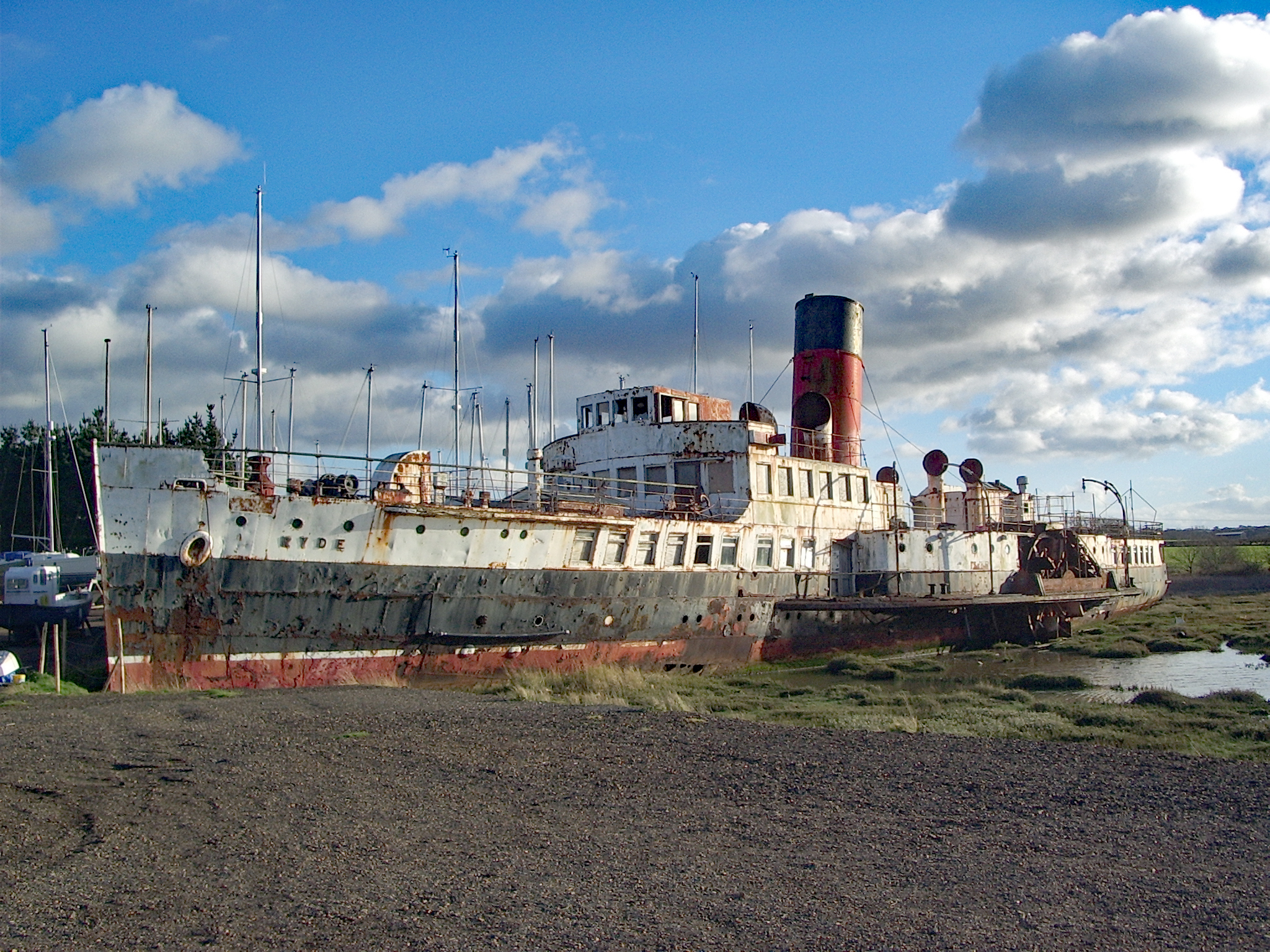
- PS Ryde at Binfield, Isle of Wight, in October 2005

History

United Kingdom
- Name: PS Ryde (1937–39, 1945–72, 1989–present); HMS Ryde (1939–45); Ryde Queen Boatel (1972–77); Ryde Queen (1977–89)
- Owner: Southern Railway (1937–39, 1945–47); Royal Navy (1939–45); British Railways (1948–70); Island Marina Holdings (−2010)
- Operator: Southern Railway (1937–47); British Railways (1948–70)
- Port of registry: (United Kingdom) Portsmouth (1937–39); (United Kingdom) Portsmouth (1939–45); (United Kingdom) Portsmouth (1945–70)
- Ordered: 15 October 1936
- Builder: William Denny and Brothers, Dumbarton
- Cost: £46,800
- Yard number: 1306
- Launched: 23 April 1937
- Completed: 4 June 1937
- Maiden voyage: 1 June 1937
- In service: 1937–1969
- Identification: Code Letters MMKG (1937–39, 1945–79); United Kingdom Official Number 166061 (1937–70)
- Status: Abandoned wreck at Island Harbour Marina

General characteristics
- Type: Paddle steamer
- Tonnage: 603 GRT; 237 NRT
- Length: 216 ft (65.84 m)
- Beam: 29 ft 1 in (8.86 m)
- Draught: 7 ft 2 in (2.18 m)
- Depth: 10 ft (3.05 m)
- Decks: 2
- Installed power: Triple expansion steam engine
- Propulsion: Paddle wheels

PS Ryde was a paddle steamer that was commissioned and run by Southern Railway as a passenger ferry between mainland England and the Isle of Wight from 1937 to 1969, with an interlude during the Second World War, where she served as a minesweeper and then an anti-aircraft ship, seeing action at D-Day. After many years abandoned on moorings at Island Harbour Marina on the River Medina, she was purchased by the PS Ryde Trust in late 2018, with the intention of raising money for her restoration. That project was abandoned in January 2019.

== Operational history ==
=== PS Ryde (1937–1939) ===
PS Ryde was commissioned by Southern Railway in 1936 as a sister ship for Sandown. Costing £46,800 (equivalent to £2,760,000 in 2025), she was built by William Denny and Brothers in Dumbarton on Clydeside and was licensed to carry 1,011 passengers. After her launch on Saint George's Day 1937, by Lady Walker, wife of Sir Herbert Walker, General Manager of the Southern Railway she replaced the PS Duchess of Norfolk on the Portsmouth to Ryde Pier passenger ferry service.

=== HMS Ryde (1939–1945) ===
In 1939, at the outbreak of the Second World War, PS Ryde and PS Sandown were both requisitioned by the Royal Navy. She was renamed HMS Ryde, and initially both were used as minesweepers in the Thames Estuary and Dover Straits. She was converted to an anti-aircraft vessel in 1942. In May 1944 she traveled to Portsmouth, from where she sailed to the Normandy coast to take part in Operation Neptune on D-Day, where she protected the Mulberry harbours at Omaha Beach. At one stage during the landings, she was hit in her engine room by a shell, but it did not explode. In spite of being instructed to beach the ship, if she ran out of coal, Ryde's commander, Lt. Commander Beamer, was able to return her safely to Portsmouth. After D-Day, HMS Ryde was anchored off Bembridge to help to protect Portsmouth Harbour from V-1 flying bombs.

=== PS Ryde (1945–1970) ===
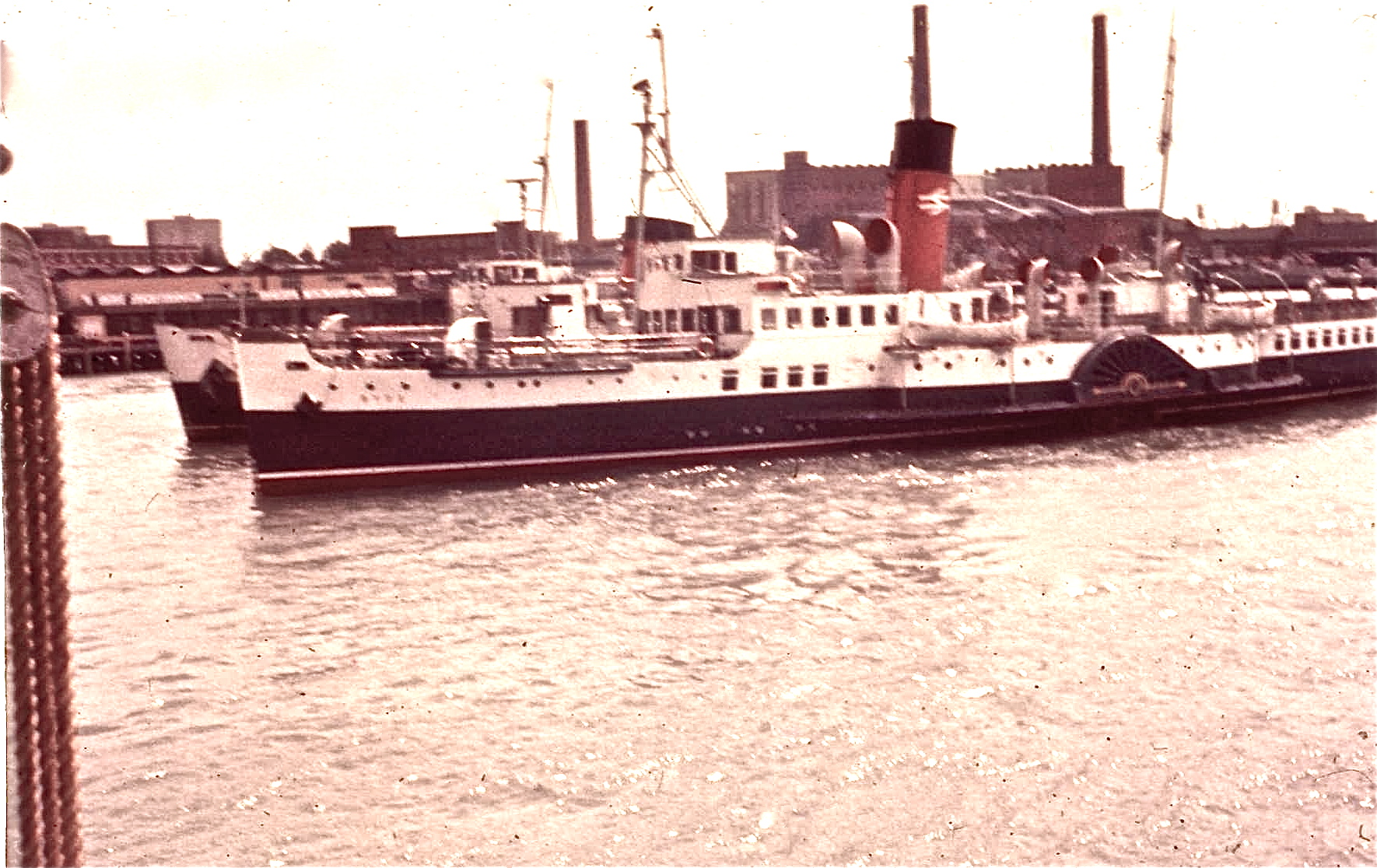
1969 at Portsmouth.

Reverting to her pre-war name upon her return to Southern Railway on 7 July 1945, PS Ryde worked on her former route and undertook a variety of chartered trips as well, such as being chartered by Gilbey's Gin to serve as a 'Floating Gin Palace' in London in 1968. However, Southern Railway started to commission more modern motor vessels after the war at the expense of the paddle steamers, starting with two diesel vessels in 1945 to replace PS Southsea and PS Portsdown. In July 1966, PS Sandown was retired and scrapped, and, in September 1969, by then a reserve ship used for Summer services mainly, it was decided to retire PS Ryde as well. At the time of her retirement, she had ferried passengers across the Solent for thirty-two years and was the last sea-going coal-fired paddle steamer in the world.

=== Ryde Queen Boatel, Ryde Queen (1970–1989) ===
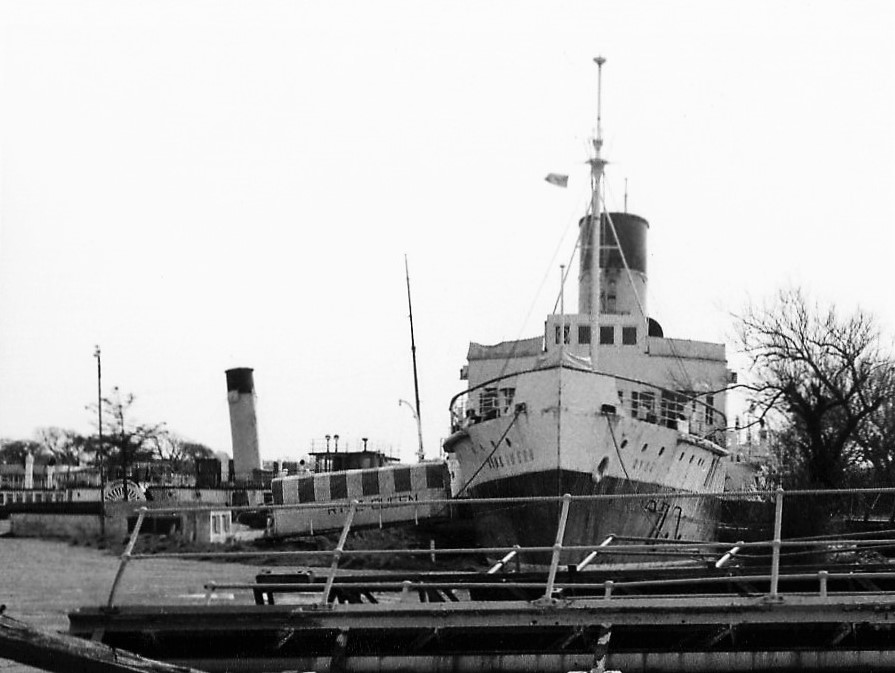
PS Ryde in 1977, with the Medway Queen in the background

Avoiding the scrapyard, and after briefly offering cruises from Tower Bridge in London, PS Ryde was bought by two Isle of Wight entrepreneurs, cousins Alan and Colin Ridett, for £12,000 in September 1970. After a two-year refit costing £60,000 and involving the removal of her boiler, she was fitted with eighteen luxury cabins, a restaurant, bar and dance-floor, and was renamed the Ryde Queen Boatel by Miss Carolyn Moore, Miss Great Britain 1971, in the opening ceremony on 14 June 1972. She served alongside the smaller PS Medway Queen in moorings at Binfield Marina on the River Medina near Newport, until Medway Queen was retired and purchased for preservation in 1978. In 1977, the Ryde Queen Boatel caught fire with the damage estimated at £100,000, but she was repaired and became a nightclub, known simply as the Ryde Queen. However, by the late 1980s her popularity had waned and the nightclub was closed in 1989. She remained derelict and abandoned on her mooring, gradually deteriorating, with her funnel collapsing in August 2006.

== Preservation ==
=== Early attempts ===
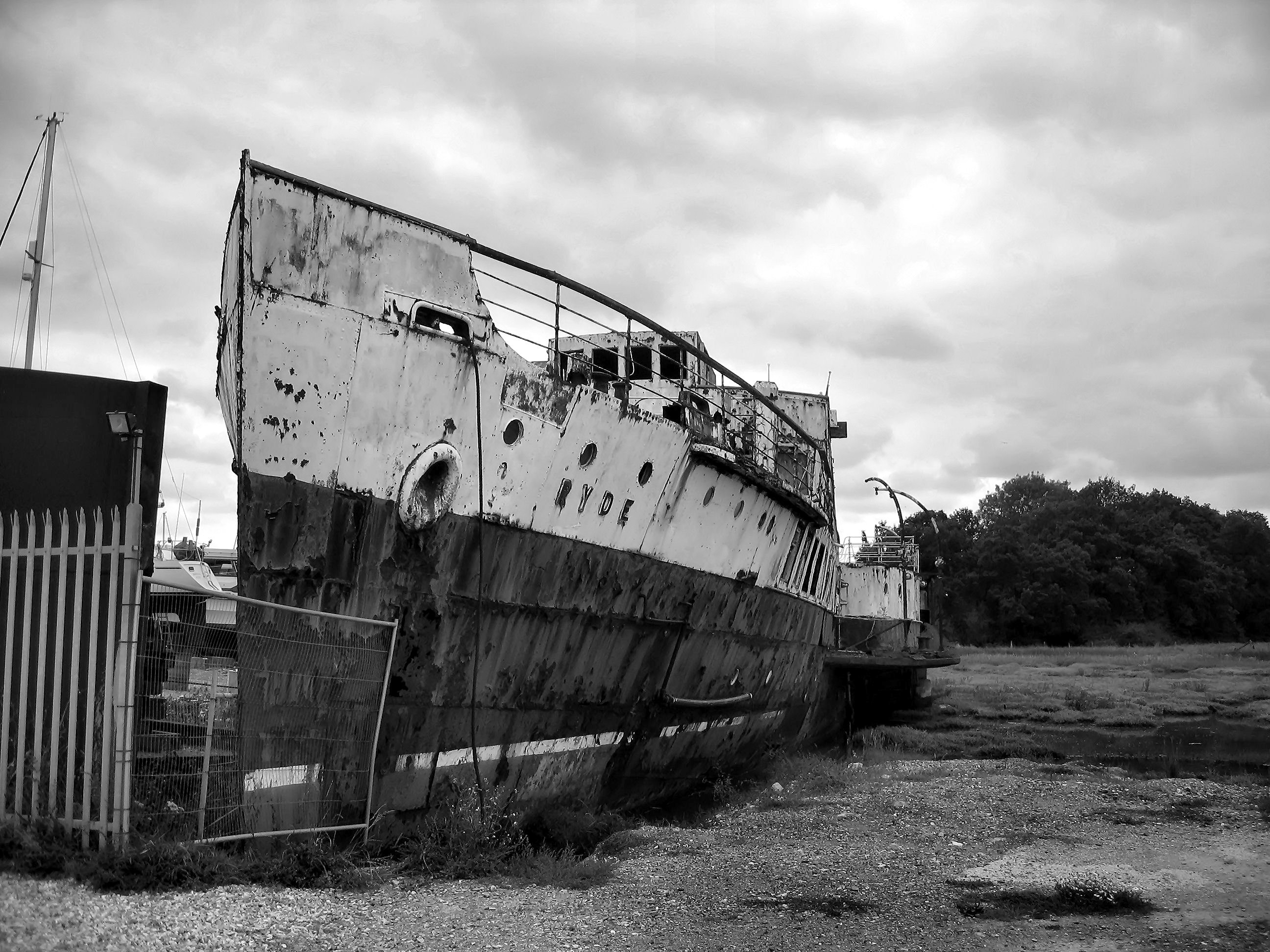
PS Ryde in 2008

In September 2009, it was announced that enthusiasts were attempting to raise funds to buy the steamer, held by receivers after her former owner, Island Harbour Holdings LTD, went into administration. A non-profit company, PS Ryde Trust, wished to restore the vessel to once again be in the condition to sail tourists across the Solent. It was estimated that £7 million would be needed for the restoration, with fundraising needs of £1,000 a month for mooring fees and £600,000 for the move to a dry dock, with the remainder of the funding coming from the National Lottery. In early 2010, work began to dismantle the vessel, beginning with asbestos removal. In 2012, the ship's bridge collapsed. The PS Ryde Trust failed to negotiate a deal to save the vessel, and the PS Ryde was left to continue to deteriorate.

An application was made to the Isle of Wight Council Planning Department on 11 June 2014 by the new owners of Island Harbour Marina for permission to retain the PS Ryde on site for a further three years. This is to allow time to evaluate and find the funding necessary to try and save her. The application was approved by the Council on 5 August 2014, guaranteeing her continued existence for at least another three years. The planning permission granted for the redevelopment of the marina states that Ryde must be removed within three years of work commencing.

=== PS Ryde Trust ===
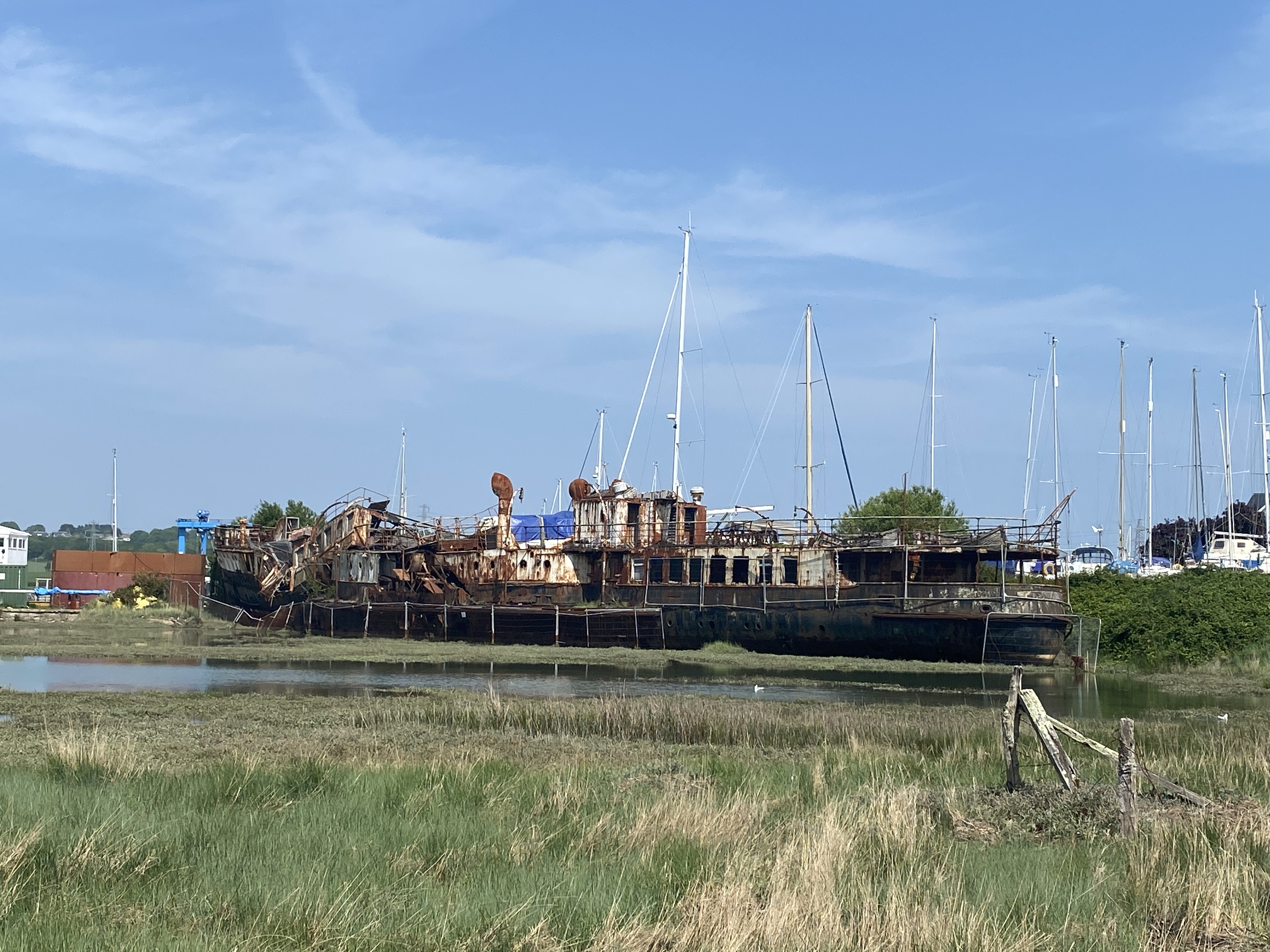
PS Ryde in May 2020

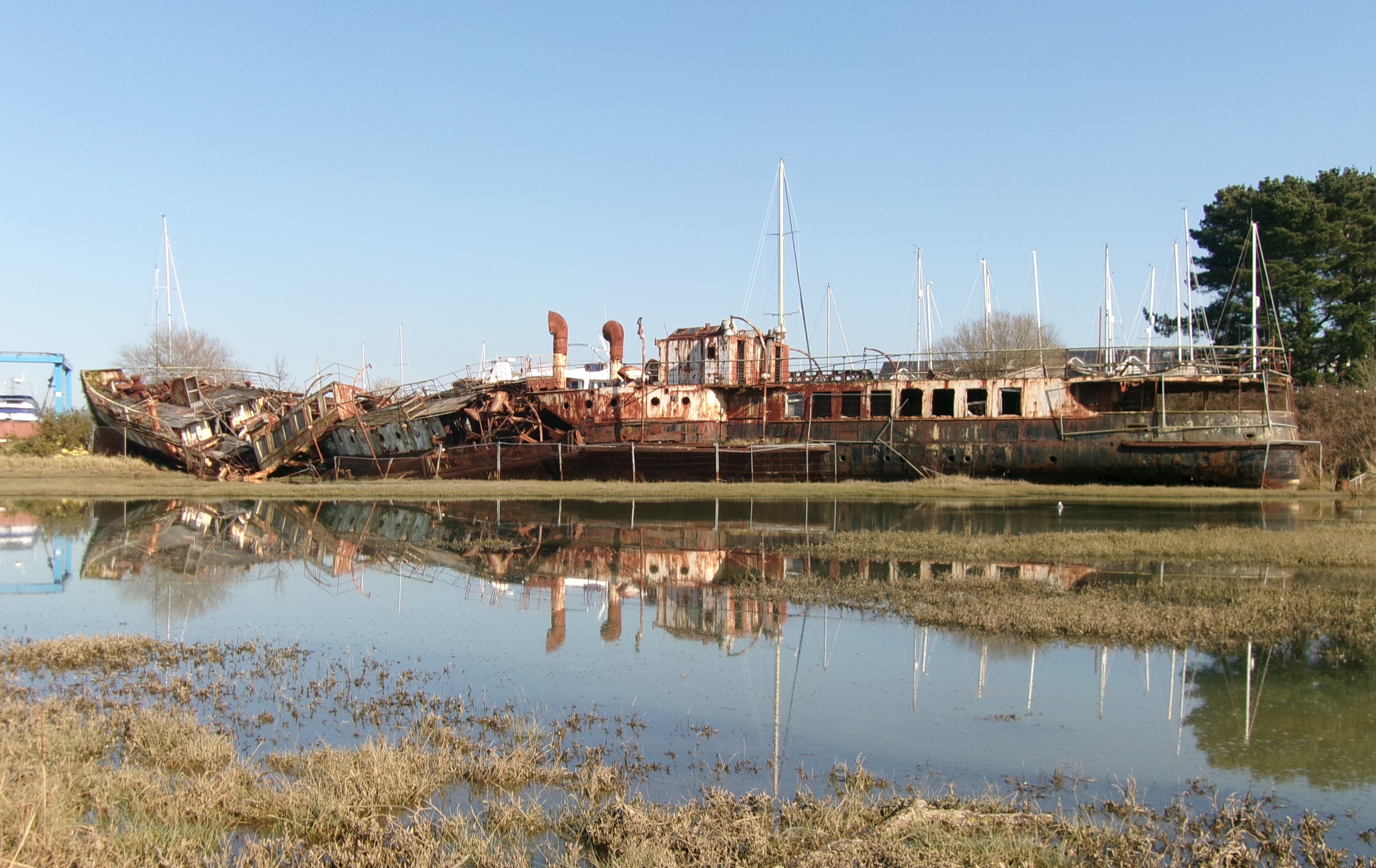
Remains of PS Ryde in March 2025

In June 2018, it was reported that Ryde had been sold and that there were plans to restore the vessel. A charitable trust was to be set up with this aim. An assessment of the vessel was to be undertaken with the assistance of the National Ships Register. It may have been necessary to cut the ship into sections to move her, with restoration estimated at £7–10 million. In November 2018 the P.S. Ryde Trust announced that funds had been raised to purchase Ryde and funding applications for the restoration would be made. After securing for the winter period and pumping out, it was intended that restoration work would start in April 2019 and last for two years, should the necessary funds be available, after which PS Ryde would be fully restored.

An inspection in December 2018 revealed that the remains of the bridge and much of the decking had collapsed. Attempts to remove the vessel would be environmentally hazardous, and it was decided to abandon the restoration project and dismantle the vessel later in 2019. Money raised from an on-line appeal would, instead, be used to fund work on the PS Medway Queen. However, as of January 2025, the dismantling work still had not commenced.

On 24 May 2025, a fire broke out on the remains of the PS Ryde, caused by work happening on a neighbouring boat, with crews being sent to the scene. There were no injuries.

== In popular culture ==
- Scenes towards the end of the 1980 film The Wildcats of St Trinian's were filmed on the Ryde Queen.
- The Ryde Queen nightclub featured in Isabel Ashdown's novel Summer of '76.

== See also ==
- List of ships built by William Denny and Brothers
