= Isle of Wight ferry services =

Ferry services connecting the Isle of Wight to mainland England

There are currently four different ferry companies that operate vessels carrying passengers and, on certain routes, vehicles across the Solent, the stretch of sea that separates the Isle of Wight from mainland England. These are Wightlink, Red Funnel, Hovertravel and Quay 2 Quay.

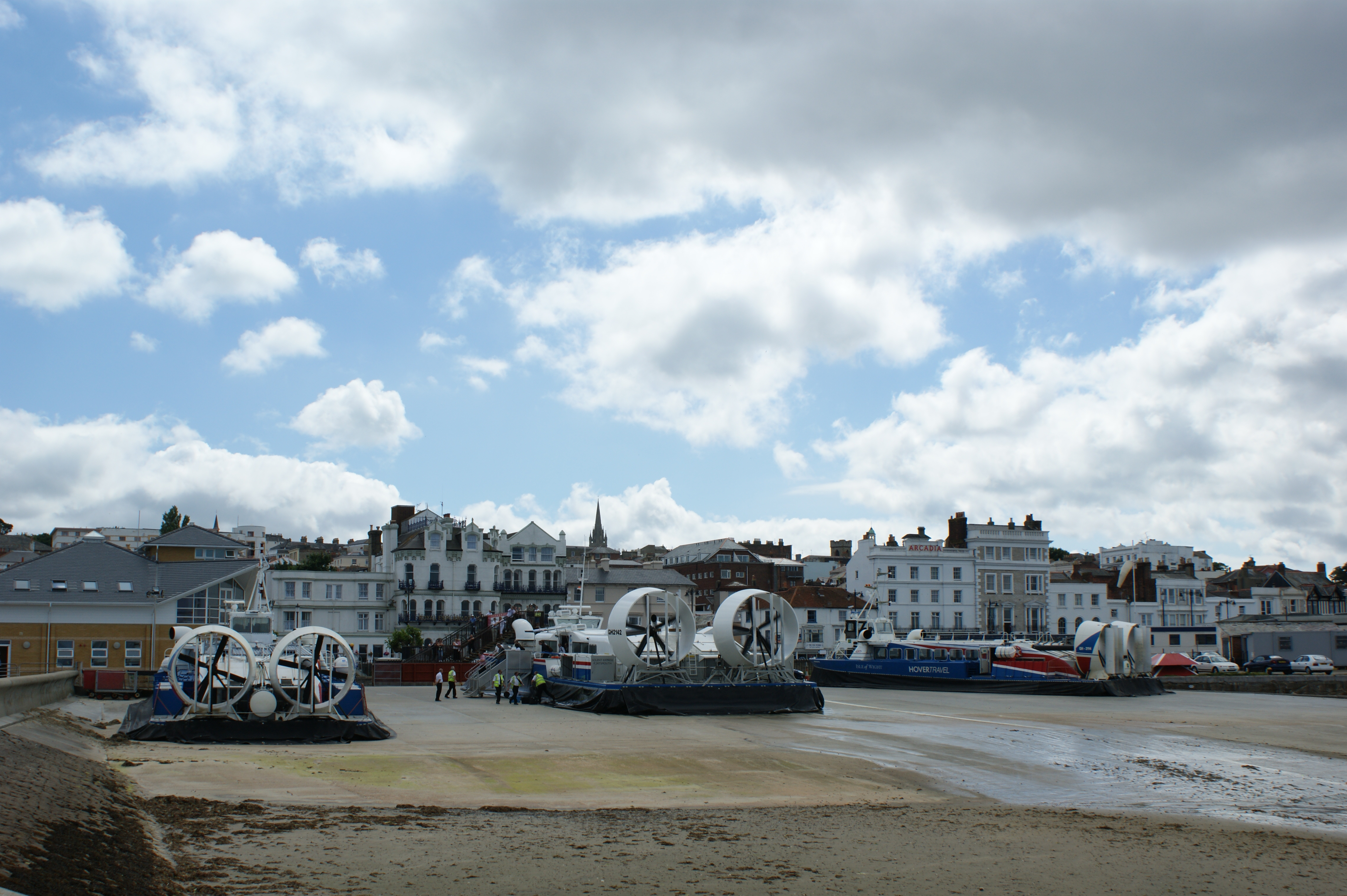
The Hovertravel fleet at Ryde.

== History ==
=== Early sail crossings ===
Since the Isle of Wight was separated from mainland Britain, probably about 7000 years ago, vessels have transported people and goods across the Solent. However the earliest record of an Isle of Wight ferry service is from 1420 when the Lord of the Manor in Ashey was responsible for boats crossing between Portsmouth and Ryde. By the 17th century a rota of Ryde fishermen were required, on penalty of a fine, to make daily return crossings to Portsmouth.

In 1796 a purpose-built sailing boat called The Packet began a regular service between Portsmouth and Ryde, and by 1811 two daily return trips were made between the Bugle Inn in Ryde and the Quebec Tavern in Portsmouth. At that time the boats, known as Ryde Wherries, had to anchor a considerable distance away from the shore at Ryde, and passengers were transported by horse, cart or on men's backs across the wide and shallow sands to the town. This problem was resolved in 1814 when Ryde Pier was completed.

=== The introduction of steam power ===
In 1817 the first steamship ferry, Britannia, began to operate on the Portsmouth–Ryde route, but she was found to be unsuitable for her role and quickly withdrawn. The first successful steam-powered regular service on the route began on 5 April 1825 with the paddle steamer PS Union. Meanwhile, in 1820 the paddle steamer PS Prince of Coburg had begun a service between Cowes and Southampton.

The success of the paddle steamers prompted a period of company formation. In 1827 the Portsmouth and Ryde Steam Packet Company (P&RSPC) was formed and took over the running of the PS Union. This was followed in 1849 by the Portsea, Portsmouth, Gosport and Isle of Wight Steam Packet Company (PPG&IWSPC) operating on the same route. These amalgamated on 1 January 1852 as the Port of Portsmouth and Ryde United Steam Packet Company (PP&RUSPC). In 1873 the Southsea and Isle of Wight Steam Ferry Company (S&IWSFC) began operating between Clarence Pier, Southsea and Ryde but was quickly taken over by the PP&RUSPC in 1876.

On the Southampton – Cowes route the Isle of Wight Royal Mail Steam Packet Company (IWRMSPC) was formed in 1820 and the Isle of Wight Steam Packet Company (IWSPC) in 1826. These merged in 1861, becoming the Southampton, Isle of Wight & South of England Royal Mail Steam Packet Company (IW&SERMSPC). This company became commonly known as Red Funnel in 1935 and is still operating today. (As of May 2025)

On the Western Solent, the first steam connection between Lymington and Yarmouth was by the Glasgow in March 1830, operated by Lymington owners and continuing also to Cowes, Southampton, Ryde and Portsmouth on various days.

=== The era of railway ownership ===
By 1880 railway lines connected to both the Ryde Pier and the Portsmouth Harbour ferry terminals. It was therefore a natural progression for the railway companies to acquire the ferry routes themselves. To do this the London, Brighton & South Coast Railway (LB&SCR) and the London & South Western Railway (L&SWR) jointly formed the South Western and Brighton Railway Companies Steam Packet Service (SW&BRCSPS). This new company bought out the PP&RUSPC and the era of railway ownership of the Ryde Portsmouth route began.

In 1884 the Isle of Wight Marine Transit Company started a rail freight ferry link between the Hayling Island Branch line at Langstone and the Bembridge branch line at St Helens quay. To provide the link the rail ferry PS Carrier was moved from Scotland. The project was unsuccessful and despite being acquired in full by the LB&SCR in 1886 ended in 1888. It remains the only rail ferry to have operated a service to the Isle of Wight.

In 1884 the Lymington service was bought by the L&SWR.

In addition to paddle steamers, the SW&BRCSPS used tow boats and a tug to carry livestock and subsequently motor cars from Broad Street, Portsmouth to the slipway at George Street, Ryde.

During the First World War four of the SW&BRCSPS paddle steamers were commandeered by the Royal Navy as minesweepers, leaving only two behind. The PS Duchess of Richmond was lost to a mine in the Mediterranean Sea.

On 1 January 1923 the SW&BRCSPS was taken over by Southern Railway which had been created in the Grouping ordered by the Railways Act 1921.

== Present day ==
Four commercial ferry operators currently provide services across the Solent. These are Hovertravel, Red Funnel, Wightlink and Quay 2 Quay. A list of routes is described below.

Route	Operator	Type of craft	Journey time
Southsea to Ryde	Hovertravel	Hovercraft	10 minutes
Portsmouth to Ryde	Wightlink	Catamaran	22 minutes
Portsmouth to Fishbourne	Wightlink	Car Ferry	45 minutes
Southampton to West Cowes	Red Funnel	Catamaran	25 minutes
Southampton to East Cowes	Red Funnel	Car Ferry	1 hour
Lymington to Yarmouth	Wightlink	Car Ferry	40 minutes
Lymington to Yarmouth	Quay 2 Quay	Catamaran	35 minutes

== Vessels ==
Vessels highlighted in Grey still serve the Isle of Wight

Name	Type^{†}	Operator(s)^{††}	Route(s)^{†††}	In service	Out of service	Notes	Image
PS Brittania	P		PR	1817		Built in Gainsborough, Lincs, in 1816. Unsuccessful experiment with steam power. Quickly withdrawn from service	
PS Union	P	P&RSPC	PR	1825			
PS Arrow	P	P&RSPC	PR	1825			
PS Lord Yarborough	P	P&RSPC	PR	1826			
PS Earl Spencer	P	P&RSPC	PR	1833			
Prince Albert	P		PR	1847			
Her Majesty	P		PR	1850			
Lindsey	P		PR	1850			
Prince of Wales	P		PR	1850			
Princess Royal	P		PR	1850			
Prince Consort	P	PP&RUSPC, SW&BRCSPS	PR	1859	1882	Built by J. Scott Russel, London	
Princess of Wales	P	PP&RUSPC, SW&BRCSPS	PR	1865	1885	Built by Lewis & Stockwell, London	
Gareloch	P		PR	1863			
Chancellor	P		PR	1863			
Duke of Edinburgh	P	PP&RUSPC, SW&BRCSPS	PR	1869	1884	Built by Money, Wigram Co, Blackwall	
Princess Alice	P	PP&RUSPC, SW&BRCSPS	PR	1869	1882	Built by Money, Wigram Co, Blackwall	
Ventnor	P		PR	1873			
Shanklin	P		PR	1873			
Southsea	P		PR	1873			
Ryde	P		PR	1873			
Heather Bell	P		PR	1876			
Albert Edward	P		PR	1878			
Alexandra	P		PR	1879			
Victoria	P		PR	1881			
PS Carrier	R	IWMTC, LB&SCR	LS	1884	1888	Built in 1858 by Scotts Shipbuilding and Engineering Co, Greenock. Failed rail ferry project. Sold in 1892 to Swedish company.	
Duchess of Edinburgh	P	SW&BRCSPS	PR	1884	1910		
Duchess of Connaught	P	SW&BRCSPS	PR	1884	1910		
Duchess of Albany	P	SW&BRCSPS, SR	PR	1889	1928	Built by Scotts, Greenock	
Princess Margaret	P	SW&BRCSPS, SR	PR	1893	1928	Built by Scotts, Greenock	
Duchess of Kent	P	SW&BRCSPS, SR	PR	1897	1933	Built by Day, Summers & Co, Southampton. Served as Royal Navy minesweeper in First World War. Replaced by PS Sandown	
Duchess of Fife	P	SW&BRCSPS, SR	PR	1899	1929	Built by Clydebank Engineering & Shipbuilding Co, Glasgow. Served as Royal Navy minesweeper in First World War	
Duchess of Richmond	P	SW&BRCSPS	PR	1910	1915	Built by D&W Henderson, Glasgow. Served as Royal Navy minesweeper in First World War. Mined and sank in Med.	
Duchess of Norfolk	P	SW&BRCSPS, SR	PR	1911	1937	Built by D&W Henderson, Glasgow. Served as Royal Navy minesweeper in First World War	
Shanklin	P	SR	PR	1924	1950	Built by John I Thornycroft & Company, Southampton; Sold to Cosens & Co and renamed Monarch	As Monarch at Swanage Pier
Merstone	P	SR	PR	1928	1950	Built by Caledon Shipbuilding & Engineering Company, Dundee	
Portsdown	P	SR	PR	1928	1940	Built by Caledon Shipbuilding & Engineering Company, Dundee	
Southsea	P	SR	PR	1930	1941	Built by Fairfield Shipbuilding & Engineering Company, Goven	
Whippingham	P	SR, BR	PR	1930	1963	Built by Fairfield Shipbuilding & Engineering Company, Goven	
Sandown	P	SR, BR	PR	1934	1966	Built by Denny in Dumbarton	Sandown and Ryde at Portsmouth Harbour 15 July 1965
PS Ryde	PPS	SR, BR	PR	1937	1970	Built by Denny in Dumbarton	In Portsmouth in 1969
TSMV Southsea	P	SL	PR	1948	1988	Built by Denny in Dumbarton	Southsea in background
TSMV Brading	P	SL	PR	1948	1986	Built by Denny in Dumbarton	
TSMV Shanklin	P	SL	PR	1951	1980	Built by Denny in Dumbarton. Renamed Prince Ivanhoe and sank off Welsh coast in 1981	Shanklin
Our Lady Patricia	PC	SL / WL	PR	1986	2006	Built by Incat, Australia	Our Lady Patricia
Our Lady Pamela	PC	SL / WL	PR	1986	2006	Built by Incat, Australia	Our Lady Pamela
FastCat Shanklin	PC	WL	PR	2000	2009		Fastcat Shanklin
FastCat Ryde	PC	WL	PR	2000	2010		Fastcat Ryde
Wight Ryder I	PC	WL	PR	2009			Wight Ryder I
Wight Ryder II	PC	WL	PR	2009			
MV Fishbourne (1927)	VP		PF	1927	1961	Built by Denny in Dumbarton	
MV Wooton	VP	SR	PF	1928	1961	Built by Denny in Dumbarton	
Hilsea	VP		PF	1931			
MV Lymington	VP	SR, BR	LY	1938	1974	Built by Denny in Dumbarton; Sold to Western Ferries as Sound of Sanda	MV Lymington
Farringford	VP		PF	1948	1980	Built by Denny in Dumbarton	
Freshwater	VP		PF	1959	1982	Built by Ailsa Shipbuilding Company, Troon; Sold to Western Ferries as Sound of Seil	
Camber Queen	VP	SL	PF	1961	1984	Built by Philip and Son in Dartmouth	
MV Fishbourne (1961)	VP	SL	PF/LY	1961	1983	Built by Philip and Son in Dartmouth	
MV Cuthred	VP	SL	PF	1969	1984	Built by Richards (Shipbuilders) Ltd in Lowestoft	
Shearwater	PH	RF	SC	1969	1973		
Shearwater 2	PH	RF	SC	1970	1971		
Shearwater 3	PH	RF	SC	1972	1992		
Shearwater 4	PH	RF	SC	1973	1992		
Shearwater 5	PH	RF	SC	1982	1999		
Shearwater 6	PH	RF	SC	1982	1999		
MV Caedmon	VP	SL / WL	PF(1973) / LY(1983)	1973	2009	Built by Robb Caledon in Dundee	MV Caedmon
MV Cenwulf	VP	SL / WL	PF(1973) / LY(1983)	1973	2009	Built by Robb Caledon in Dundee	MV Cenwulf
MV Cenred	VP	SL / WL	PF(1974) / LY(1983)	1974	2009	Built by Robb Caledon in Dundee	MV Cenred
MV St Catherine	VP	SL / WL	PF	1983	2010	Built by Robb Caledon Shipbuilders in Leith	MV St Catherine in 2008
MV St Helen	VP	SL / WL	PF	1983	2015	Built by Robb Caledon Shipbuilders in Leith	MV St Helen in 2008
MV St Cecilia	VP	SL / WL	PF	1987	2019	Built by Cochrane Shipbuilders in Selby	MV St Cecilia in 2008
MV St Faith	VP	WL	PF	1990		Built by Cochrane Shipbuilders in Selby	MV St Faith in 2013
MV St Clare	VP	WL	PF	2001		Built by Remontowa, Gdańsk	MV St Clare in 2003
PS Gem	P	IWSPC, RF	SC	1840	1883	Built by J. White, Cowes. Scrapped in 1889.	
PS Ruby	P	IWRMSPC, RF	SC	1841	1872	Built by Day, Summers & Co. Northam for the South Western & Isle of Wight Steam Navigation Co as 'The Pride of the Waters'	
PS Pearl	P	IWRMSPC, RF	SC	1844	1867	Built by Day, Summers & Co. Northam. Scrapped in 1875	
PS Queen (I)	P	IWRMSPC, RF	SC	1848	1876	Built by Day, Summers & Co. Northam.	
PS Prince of Coburg	P	IWSPC	SC	1820		Built in Gainsborough, Lincs, in 1817	
Earl of Malmsbury	P	IWSPC	SC				
George IV	P	IWSPC	SC				
PS Medina (I)	P	IWRMSPC, RF	SC	1852	1882	Built by J. White, Cowes as The Times	
PS Emerald	P	IWSPC, RF	SC	1857	1871	Built by Day, Summers & Co. Northam.	
PS Saphire	P	IWSPC, RF	SC	1860	1873	Built by CA Day. Northam.	
PS Princess Elizabeth	PPS	IWSPC, RF	SC	1927		Built by Day, Summers and Company	PS Princess Elizabeth as she is now
MV Norris Castle	VP	RF	SC	1947	1962	Built by Alexander Finlay & Co in Glasgow. Originally constructed as a tank landing craft for the Normandy landings. Sold to a Greek operator.	
MV Balmoral	VP	RF	SC	1949	1968	Built by John I Thornycroft & Company in Woolston. Sold to P & A Campbell	MV Balmoral as she is now
MV Carisbrooke Castle	VP	RF	SC	1959	1974	Built by John I Thornycroft & Company in Woolston. Sold to operator in Naples	
MV Osborne Castle	VP	RF	SC	1962	1978	Built by John I Thornycroft & Company in Woolston. Sold to a Canadian ferry company.	
MV Cowes Castle	VP	RF	SC	1965	1994	Built by John I Thornycroft & Company in Woolston. Sold to Jadrolinija for service in Croatia.	MV Cowes Castle
MV Norris Castle	VP	RF	SC	1968	1994	Built by John I Thornycroft & Company in Woolston. Sold to Jadrolinija for service in Croatia.	MV Norris Castle
MV Netley Castle	VP	RF	SC	1974	1997	Built by Ryton Marine Ltd in Wallsend. Sold to operator in Croatia	MV Netley Castle
MV Bergen Castle	VP	RF	SC	2003	2005	Purchased by Red Funnel to maintain a 3 ship service while the Raptor class where away being refitted	
Red Eagle	VP	RF	SC	1996		Built by Ferguson Shipbuilders	Red Eagle in 2005
Red Falcon	VP	RF	SC	1994		Built by Ferguson Shipbuilders	MV Red Falcon in 2009
Red Osprey	VP	RF	SC	1994		Built by Ferguson Shipbuilders	MV Red Osprey in 2009
Red Jet 1	PC	RF	SC	1991	2009	Built by Fairey Marine, Southampton	Red Jet 1
Red Jet 2	PC	RF	SC	1992	2009	Built by Fairey Marine, Southampton	Red Jet 2
Red Jet 3	PC	RF	SC	1998	2019	Built by Fairey Marine, Southampton	Red Jet 3
Red Jet 4	PC	RF	SC	2003	2024	Built by North West Bay Ships, Hobart	Red Jet 4 in 2006
Red Jet 5	PC	RF	SC	2009	2016		Red Jet 5
Wight Light	VP	WL	LY	2009		Built by Kraljevica Shipyard, Croatia	Wight Light in 2008
Wight Sky	VP	WL	LY	2009		Built by Kraljevica Shipyard, Croatia	Wight Sky in 2009
Wight Sun	VP	WL	LY	2009		Built by Kraljevica Shipyard, Croatia	Wight Sun
Double-O-Seven	H	HT	SR	1989	2003	Built by British Hovercraft Corporation	
Freedom 90	H	HT	SR	1990	2018	Built by British Hovercraft Corporation	Freedom 90 in 2008
Courier	H	HT	SR	1990	2000	Built by British Hovercraft Corporation	
Idun Viking	H	HT	SR	1997	2002	Built by British Hovercraft Corporation	
Island Express	H	HT	SR	2002	2017	Built by British Hovercraft Corporation	
Solent Express	H	HT	SR	2007	2011	Built by Griffon Hoverwork, Southampton; The Solent Express was used on Kirkcaldy to Portobello hovercraft passenger trials in 2007.	Solent Express in 2007
Solent Flyer	H	HT	SR	2016		Built by Griffon Hoverwork, Southampton	Solent Flyer in 2018
Island Flyer	H	HT	SR	2016		Built by Griffon Hoverwork, Southampton	
Red Jet 6	PC	RF	SC	2016		Built by Wight Shipyard, Cowes, Isle of Wight	Red Jet 6 in 2023
Red Jet 7	PC	RF	SC	2018		Built by Wight Shipyard, Cowes, Isle of Wight	Red Jet 7
Victoria of Wight	VP	WL	PF	2018		Built by Cemre Shipyard, Turkey	Victoria of Wight in 2018
Red Kestrel	F	RF	SC	2019		Built by Cammell Laird, Birkenhead; Operates as a freight only vessel	Red Kestrel
Kraken	PC	QQ	LY	2024		Built by Blyth Catamarans Ltd, Canvey Island, Essex	

Key
^{†}	Vessel type	P = Passenger, VP = Vehicle and passenger, PC = Passenger catamaran, PPS = Passenger paddle steamer, H = Hovercraft, F = Freight, PH = Passenger Hydrofoil
^{††}	Operators	RF = Red Funnel, WL = Wightlink, HT = Hovertravel, SL = Sealink, IWSPC = Isle of Wight Steam Packet Company, IWRMSPC = Isle of Wight royal mail steam packet company, P&RSPC = Portsmouth and Ryde Steam Packet Company, SW&BRCSPS = South Western and Brighton Railway Companies Steam Packet Service, PP&RUSPC = Port of Portsmouth and Ryde United Steam Packet Company, SR = Southern Railway, BR = British Rail, QQ = Quay 2 Quay
^{†††}	Routes	PR = Portsmouth Harbour to Ryde Pier Head, PF = Portsmouth Harbour to Fishbourne, SC = Southampton to Cowes, SR = Southsea to Ryde, LY = Lymington to Yarmouth

== Bibliography ==
- Adams, R B (1986). Red Funnel and Before. Southampton, Hampshire: Kingfisher Railway Productions. ISBN 0-946184-21-6.
- Haws, Duncan (1993). Britain's Railway Steamers: Western & Southern Companies + French & Stena. Hereford: TCL Publications. ISBN 0-946378-21-5.
- Hendy, John (1993). Wightlink: Isle of Wight Ferries (2nd ed.). Narberth, Pembrokeshire: Ferry Publications. ISBN 0951309366.
- Hendy, John (2008). Lymington-Yarmouth: The New Generation. Ramsey, Isle of Man: Ferry Publications. ISBN 9781906608019.
- Hendy, John (2010). Solent Seaways: Wightlink – Isle of Wight Ferries. Ramsey, Isle of Man: Ferry Publications. ISBN 9781906608118.
- O'Brien, Capt F T O (1973). Early Solent Steamers: A History of Local Steam Navigation. Newton Abbot, Devon: David & Charles. ISBN 0-7153-5654-2.(covers period up to the 1860s)
