= List of LB&SCR ships =

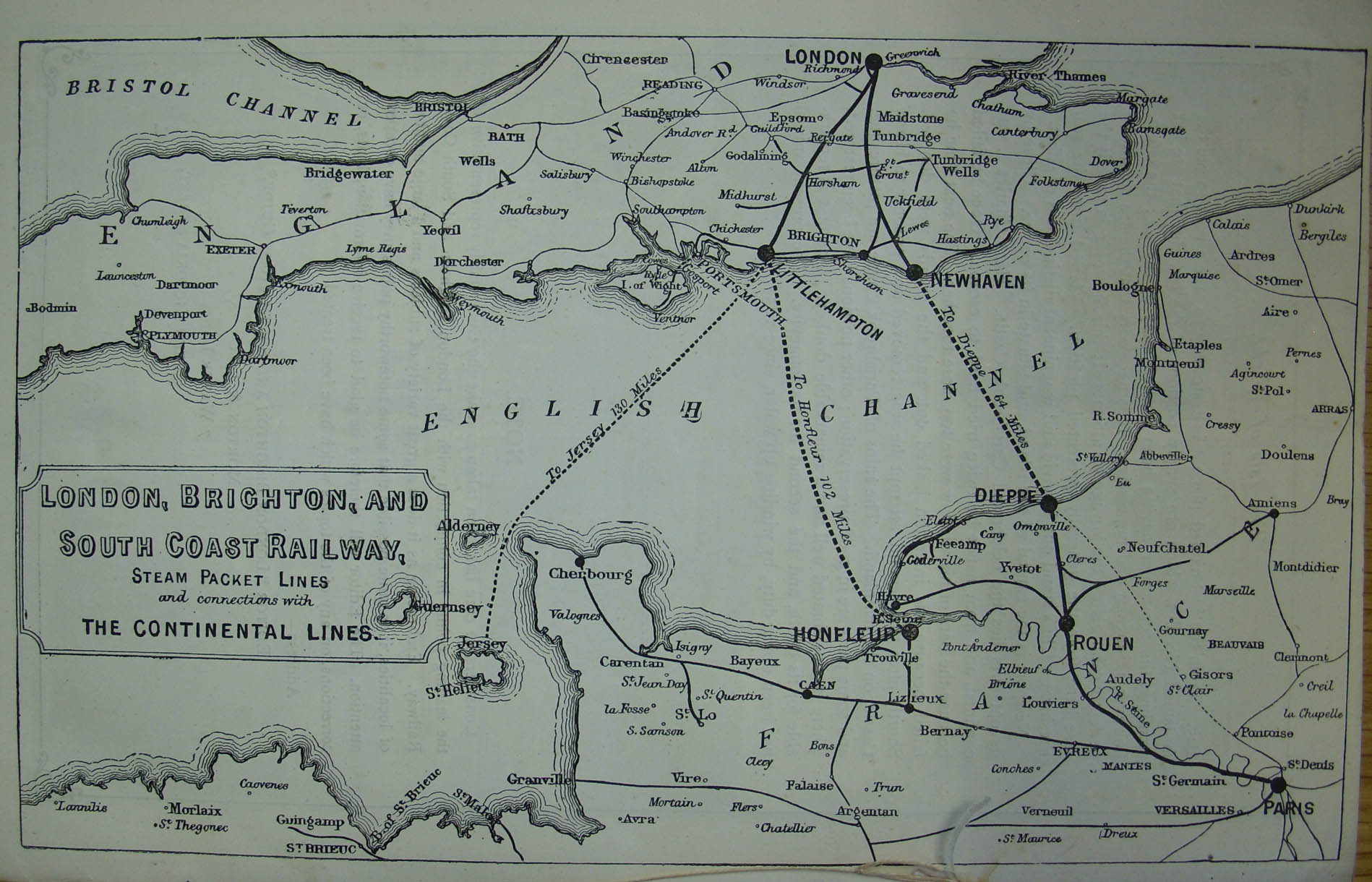
A map showing the main LB&SCR ferry routes in 1888

The London Brighton and South Coast Railway operated a number of cross channel ferry services, between its ports of Shoreham, Newhaven and Littlehampton to Dieppe, Honfleur, and Jersey. The profitable Newhaven-Dieppe service was operated in conjunction with the French Western Railway (Chemins de Fer de l'Ouest).

After 1880 the railway became a partner with the London and South Western Railway to form the South Western and Brighton Railway Companies Steam Packet Service (SW&BRCSPS) which bought out the existing operators between Portsmouth and the Isle of Wight.

In 1884 the Isle of Wight Marine Transit Company started a rail freight ferry link between the Hayling Island Branch Line at Langstone and the Bembridge branch line at St Helens quay. To provide the link the rail ferry Carrier, designed to carry railway trucks, was moved from Scotland. The project was unsuccessful and despite being acquired in full by the LB&SCR in 1886 ended in 1888

== Ships ==
Ships operated by the LB&SCR and (after 1863) Chemin de Fer de l'Ouest were:

Ship	Launched	Tonnage (GRT)	Notes
Alexandra	1863	325	Sold in 1883 to C Daniel, London.
Arundel	1900	1,067	Built Denny & Co. Dumbarton. Fitted out as a troopship 1914. Scrapped 1934.
Ayrshire Lassie	1839	169	Bought in 1851 from J Southern, Liverpool. Sold later that year.
Bordeaux	1865	419	Sold in 1890 to Bull & Co Ltd, Newhaven.
Brighton	1847	273	Sold in 1850 to Italy.
Brighton	1878	531	Collided with Dieppe Pier and sank January 1893. Salvaged and sold out of service in 1893.
Brighton	1903	1,129	Built Denny & Co. Dumbarton. Fitted out as troopship and then an ambulance ship. Sold 1930 for conversion to a private yacht, renamed Roussalka. Wrecked 25 August 1933.
Brittany	1882	605	2500 hp. Sold to Liverpool and Douglas Steamers Ltd in 1902. Scrapped at Preston in June 1904.
Brittany	1910	618	Sold to London and South Western Railway in 1912, renamed Aldershot in 1933, sold to Italy in 1936 and renamed Hercules. Torpedoed on 24 November 1941 by HMS Triumph at Heraklion Harbour, Crete.
Calvados	1894	570	Cargo vessel, built Denny & Co. Dumbarton. Sold in 1901 to General Steam Navigation Co Ltd, renamed Alouette.
Culloden	1845	250	Bought in 1851 from Denny Bros. Sold back to them the same year.
Dieppe	1847	123	Sold in 1849 to Bermuda.
Dieppe	1855	270	Out of service c1870.
Dieppe			Was run into by Victoria and sunk at Dieppe on 18 December 1881.
Dieppe	1905	1,210	Built Denny & Co. Dumbarton. Used as military transport 1914, later a hospital ship and troopship. Sold 1933 for conversion to a private yacht, renamed Rosaura.
Honfleur	1865		411 tons Builder's measurement.
La France	1899	729	Became troopship 1914. Scrapped in 1923.
London	1853	341	Sold in 1860 to Italy, renamed Generale Garibaldi.
Lyons	1856	244	Scrapped in 1885.
Lymington	1882	204	
Mayflower	1866	69	Purchased from the Solent Steamship Co Ltd in July 1884. Scrapped 1910
Manche	1897	978	Sold in 1913 to Bordeaux Chamber of Commerce, renamed Le Verdon.
Marseilles	1864	32	Sold in 1885 to Jones, Liverpool.
Menai	1830	235	In service 1844-48.
Newhaven	1847	123	Sold in 1849 to Aberdeen, Leith, Clyde & Tay Shipping Co Ltd.
Newhaven	1911	1,655	Became troopship 1914. Scrapped in 1947.
Normandy	1882		2500 hp. Sold to Liverpool and Douglas Steamers Ltd in 1902. Sold to Red Funnel Line in 1903, scrapped in 1909.
Normandy	1910	618	Sold to London and South Western Railway in 1912. Torpedoed on 25 January 1918 and sunk off Cape La Hague.
Orleans		270	In service 1856, Scrapped 1878.
Paris	1852	238	Wrecked in 1863 off Jersey.
Paris	1875	488	Resold in 1888 to builders.
Paris	1888	785	Designed William Stroudley, built by Fairfield Shipbuilding and Engineering Company, 3500 hp. Sold in 1912 to the Shipping Federation.
Paris	1913	1,774	Became minelayer 1914. Bombed and sunk at Dunkirk in 1940.
Prince Arthur	1896	578	Sold in 1901 to the South Eastern and Chatham Railway, renamed Deal.
Rothesay Castle	1837	180	Purchased in 1851 from Roxburgh, sold to Denny Bros. in the same year.
Rouen	1853	260	Out of service c1868.
PS Rouen	1888	785 900	Built by Fairfield Shipbuilding and Engineering Company, 3500 hp. Sold in 1903 to Barrow Steam Navigation Co Ltd, renamed Duchess of Bucchleugh.
Rouen	1912	1,656	Became auxiliary scout 1914, torpedoed 1916, salvaged and employed as a military transport. Scrapped in 1949 at Dieppe.
Seaford	1892	997	Designed John Biles, built Denny & Co. Dumbarton. Sank off Newhaven after collision with SS Lyon.
Seine	1891	808	Sold in 1906 and renamed Celia.
PS Solent	1902	161	
Sussex	1896	1,565	Designed John Biles, built Denny & Co. Dumbarton. Became troopship 1914, torpedoed 1916, and salvaged. Sold in 1920 to Greece, renamed Aghia Sophia. Scrapped in 1921 following fire damage.
Tamise	1891	953	Scrapped in 1913.
Trouville	1894	570	Cargo vessel, built Denny & Co. Dumbarton. Sold in 1901 to the South Eastern and Chatham Railway, renamed Walmer.
Versailles	1921	1,903	Scrapped in 1945.
Victoria	1878	531	Wrecked at Varengeville-sur-Mer, Seine-Inférieure, France on 13 April 1887 with the loss of 19 of the 90 people on board.

The company also operated a number of ships on the Isle of Wight Portsmouth to Ryde service jointly with the London and South Western Railway.

Ship	Launched	Tonnage (GRT)	Notes
PS Duchess of Albany	1889	256	Scrapped in 1928.
PS Duchess of Connaught	1884	342	Scrapped in 1910.
PS Duchess of Edinburgh	1884	342	Scrapped in 1910.
PS Duchess of Fife	1899	443	Scrapped in November 1929 at Bolness.
PS Duchess of Kent	1897	399	Sold to New Medway Steam Packet Co Ltd in 1933 and renamed Clacton Queen. Sold to Mersey & Blackpool Steamship Co Ltd in November 1935 and renamed Jubilee Queen. Sold to Jubilee Shipping Co and then S B Kelly in July 1936. Scrapped in June 1937 at Barrow in Furness.
PS Duchess of Norfolk	1911	381	Requisitioned by Royal Navy in 1916 as HMS Duchess of Norfolk. Returned to owners in 1920. Sold in 1937 to Cosens & Co Ltd, renamed Embassy. Requisitioned by Royal Navy in 1939 as HMS Ambassador. Returned to owners in 1945, renamed Embassy. Scrapped in 1967 at Boom, Belgium.
PS Duchess of Richmond	1910	354	Struck a mine on 28 June 1919 and sank.
PS Princess Margaret	1893	260	
PS Victoria	1881	366	Scrapped in 1900 at Bolness.

== Sources ==
- Acworth, W M (1888). "The London and Brighton Railway". Murray's Magazine (July 1888). London: John Murray.
- Marx, Klaus (2007). Lawson Billinton: a career cut short. Usk: The Oakwood Press. ISBN 978-0-85361-661-0.
- Marx, Klaus (2008). Robert Billinton: an engineer under pressure. Usk: The Oakwood Press. ISBN 978-0-85361-676-4.
