= TSMV Shanklin =

Ship built in 1951

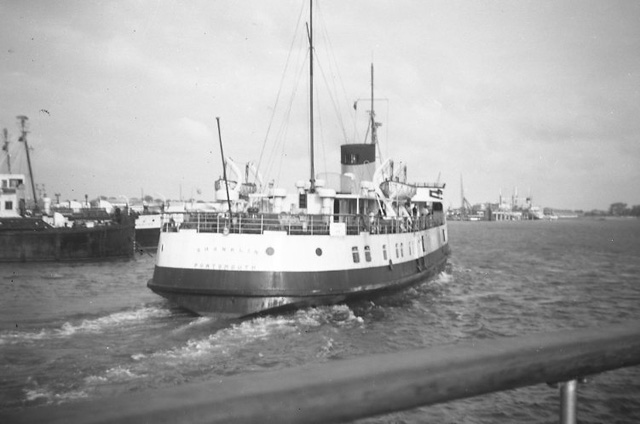
- Shanklin in Portsmouth Harbour

History

United Kingdom
- Name: 1951-1980: TSMV Shanklin; 1980-1981: TSMV Prince Ivanhoe
- Operator: British Railways; Sealink; Firth of Clyde Steam Packet Company
- Builder: William Denny & Brothers, Dumbarton
- Yard number: 1452
- Launched: 22 February 1951 by Mrs V. M Barrington-Ward
- In service: 18 June 1951
- Out of service: 3 August 1981
- Identification: IMO number: 5321772
- Fate: Sank.

General characteristics
- Class & type: Twin Screw Motor Vessel Passenger Ferry
- Tonnage: 965
- Length: 200 feet (61 m)
- Beam: 46 feet (14 m)
- Draught: 7 feet (2.1 m)
- Propulsion: 2 x Sulzer 8 MD 32 two-stroke 950 bhp diesel engines
- Speed: 14.4 knots
- Capacity: 1377 (summer) 1151 (winter)
- Crew: 33

TSMV Shanklin was a passenger ferry that operated between Portsmouth and the Isle of Wight between 1951 and 1980. Renamed Prince Ivanhoe she went on to become a pleasure cruiser in the Bristol Channel but in 1981 sank off the Welsh coast on her first season.

== Background and construction ==
Following World War II, Southern Railway, that provided passenger and vehicle ferry services to the Isle of Wight, decided to supplement and replace the existing coal burning paddle steamers that operated on the Portsmouth to Ryde route with modern twin screw diesel powered vessels (TSMV).

Initial plans, incorrectly based on a predicted downward trend in passenger numbers, were to order the construction of two such vessels. These were to be the identical ships Southsea and Brading built by William Denny & Brothers in Dumbarton on Clydeside. They were launched in 1948 and went into service with the now nationalised British Railways. One of the existing paddle steamers, Merstone, was replaced (two having been sunk during World War II) and four were retained.

Increasing numbers of passengers quickly led to the order for a third similar ship. Shanklin, designed to replace the paddle steamer Shanklin. Again built by William Denny & Brothers, the new Shanklin was launched on 22 February 1951. The ceremony was performed by Mrs V. M Barrington-Ward whose husband was a member of the British Railways executive.

As a result of experience gained from building and operating Brading and Southsea, Shanklin was designed slightly differently from her sisters. She had a taller funnel, raised lifeboats and increased passenger deck space.

== Ferry service ==
Shanklin went into service with British Railways on 18 June 1951. At this time there were three main activities for the passenger ferry fleet

- The regular ferry route from Portsmouth to Ryde Pier head.
- The summer only ferry route from Southsea (South parade pier) to Ryde pier head.
- Summer only Solent cruises and excursions.

In addition to Shanklin the five other vessels undertaking these tasks at this time were:

- TSMV Southsea
- TSMV Brading
- PS Whippingham
- PS Sandown
- PS Ryde

The withdrawal of the paddle steamers in 1970 resulted in the two ferry routes being combined as a three stage Portsmouth to Southsea (Clarence Pier) to Ryde route for some sailings.

Shanklin underwent a major refit over the winter of 1966/67. This resulted in an extended bridge deck and modernised lounge and saloon.

Shanklin's career was punctuated by a number of accidents. She collided with Ryde Pier on three occasions – on Saturday 5 June 1954, 9 March 1973, and 12 June 1979. The 1973 accident was the most serious. At 12:35 in the morning, in heavy fog, she struck the pier's roadway destroying 40 feet (12 m) of its length. A taxi being driven up the pier fell into the gap and sank. Fortunately the driver escaped.

In 1978 it was decided that only two vessels were needed on regular services. As Shanklin was by then regularly suffering engine problems it was decided to place her in reserve. She was finally withdrawn on 7 March 1980 and put up for sale.

== Prince Ivanhoe ==
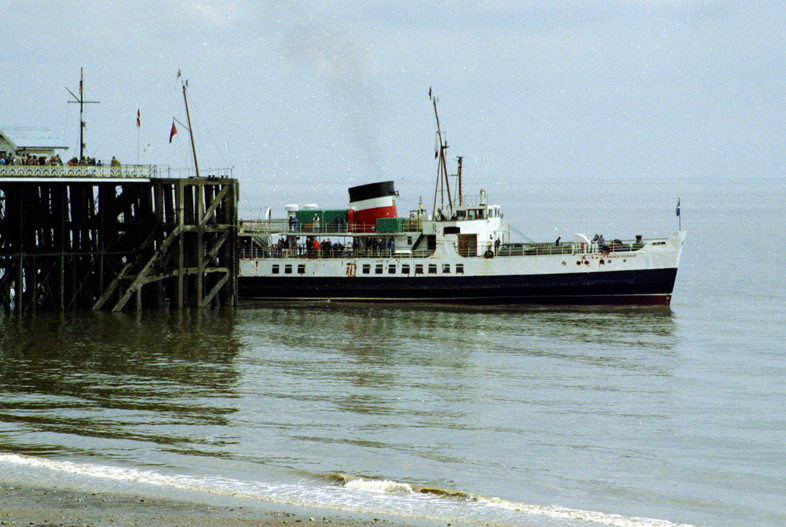
As Prince Ivanhoe

In October 1980 Shanklin was bought by the Firth of Clyde Steam Packet Company, who already ran the paddle steamer Waverley on coastal excursions, and renamed Prince Ivanhoe.

After renovations on Clydeside over the winter of 1980/81 she began public and private pleasure sailings in the Bristol Channel starting in May 1981.

=== Sinking ===
On 3 August 1981 Prince Ivanhoe began a pleasure trip starting at Penarth with stops at Minehead and Mumbles and then a cruise along the Gower coast. By the time she left Mumbles she had 450 passengers on board.

She navigated close to the shore around Oxwich Point into Port Eynon Bay at 15:35. Whilst emerging from this bay she hit a submerged object, probably rocks or a wreck, tearing a 60-foot (18 m) gash in her hull. Realising that she was sinking her captain, David Neill, sailed her about one mile (1.6 km) to Horton, Swansea where she was beached.

An RAF air-sea rescue helicopter and RNLI life boats from Horton, Port Eynon and Mumbles went to her assistance and all of the passengers were saved, mainly by being ferried to the shore in life boats. One passenger died from a heart attack on the beach after being rescued.

The wrecked ship remained where it had come to rest. There were several salvage attempts, which had varying degrees of success, until the hull was finally removed in July and August 1984.

== See also ==
British Railways ships
Wightlink
