= HMS Whippingham =

At least two ships of the Royal Navy have been named HMS Whippingham :

- HMS Whippingham, an auxiliary paddle minesweeper serving in World War II
- HMS Whippingham (M2739), a Ham-class minesweeper completed in 1955 and immediately transferred to France as Dahlia

== See also ==
- Whippingham (disambiguation)
