= PS Duchess of Fife =

Two ships have been named PS Duchess of Fife:

- PS Duchess of Fife (1899) launched in 1899 and scrapped in 1929
- PS Duchess of Fife (1903) launched in 1903 and scrapped in 1953
