= Whippingham (disambiguation) =

Whippingham is a village on the Isle of Wight, England.

Whippingham may also refer to:

- HMS Whippingham, ships of the Royal Navy
- PS Whippingham, a paddle steamer
- Whippingham railway station
