= MS Sis =

Car and passenger ferry, formerly operated on the Isle of Wight

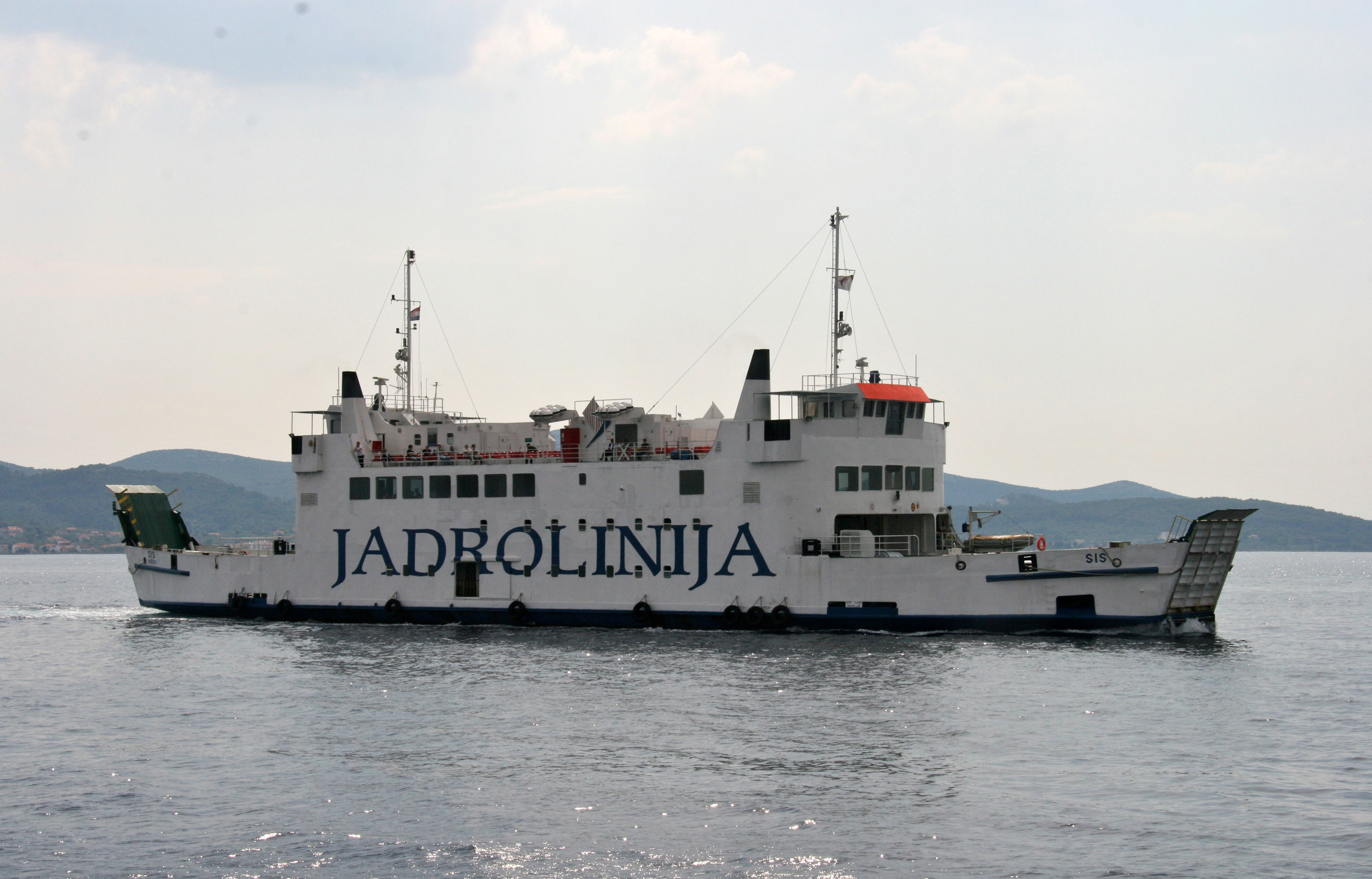

History

United Kingdom
- Name: Netley Castle
- Operator: Red Funnel
- Port of registry: Southampton
- Builder: Ryton Marine, Wallsend, England
- Launched: 23 November 1973
- In service: 24 June 1974
- Identification: Call sign: 9A4185; IMO number: 7341219; MMSI number: 238114840
- Fate: Sold 1997

History

Croatia
- Name: Sis
- Operator: Jadrolinija
- Port of registry: Rijeka
- Acquired: 1997
- Status: In service

General characteristics (as built)
- Tonnage: 1,183 GRT
- Length: 73.82 m (242 ft 2 in)
- Beam: 15.16 m (49 ft 9 in)
- Draught: 2.28 m (7 ft 6 in)
- Installed power: 4 × Caterpillar D379 diesel engines. 32.2 litre V8-cylinder, 6.25" bore x 8" stroke. Each 565bhp @ 1225rpm.
- Propulsion: 4 x Aquamaster Z-drives
- Speed: 14 kn (25.9 km/h)
- Capacity: 1000 passengers; 80 cars

Sis is a car and passenger ferry owned and operated by Jadrolinija in Croatia, where she operates between the city of Zadar and the islands of Iž and Rava. The vessel was previously known as Netley Castle when operated by Red Funnel on services to the Isle of Wight in the UK.

== History ==
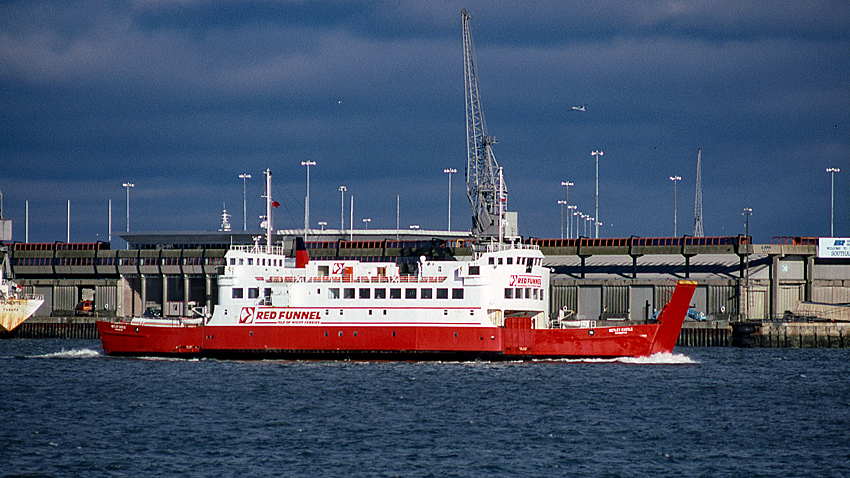
Netley Castle passing the old docks in Southampton

Sis was ordered from Ryton Marine in 1972 as Netley Castle for Red Funnel. The ship was launched on 23 November 1973 and after finishing work, trials and modifications entered service 24 June 1974. The vessel operated between Southampton and East Cowes until April 1996 when the vessel was replaced by Red Eagle. The ferry briefly re-entered service for two days on 31 July 1996 to cover for Red Osprey. She was sold to Jadrolinija and left Southampton on 24 January 1997 to transfer to Zadar, stopping at Gibraltar on 2 February.

As of 2018, she is operating the Jadrolinija line Zadar – Iž – Rava.

== Design ==
The ferry is double ended and to support this has two bridges, one at either end of the ship's superstructure. This allows true drive through operation on both legs of the route. Her predecessors were more conventional, which involved two reversals on one leg of the crossing. This added significant time to the journey, meaning the timetable was unbalanced. The ship had a side ramp on the north side, as seen in the photograph, to allow cars to be landed or embarked from the pontoon at West Cowes. This service ceased in the mid-1980s.

She is powered by four Caterpillar D379 diesel engines, each one driving an Aquamaster Z-drive which can provide thrust through 360º, eliminating the need for a conventional rudder and making her very manoeuvrable. These give her a service speed of 14 knots (26 km/h; 16 mph).

== Incidents ==
On 30 November 1975, she collided with the sea wall at Cowes in thick fog. The passengers and cars were disembarked at West Cowes to await rescue by Norris Castle.

Just before Easter 1983, she lost power approaching Town Quay and collided with another vessel moored at the quay. This necessitated urgent repairs at Husbands' shipyard at Marchwood to get her back into service for the Easter rush.
