= Dieppe (disambiguation) =

Dieppe is a commune in Normandy, France.

Dieppe may also refer to:

== Places ==
- Dieppe, New Brunswick, a city in Canada near Moncton, New Brunswick
- Dieppe-sous-Douaumont, a French commune in Lorraine, France
- Dieppe Bay, Antigua and Barbuda, a village in Antigua
- Dieppe Bay Town, a seaside town on Saint Kitts
- Dieppe Barracks, a military installation used by the Singapore Army

== Ships ==
- HMS Dieppe (1905), a steamship converted as a troopship, hospital ship, yacht and RN armed boarding craft
- SS Dieppe (1905)
- SS Dieppe (1847), a LB&SCR ship
- SS Dieppe (1855), a LB&SCR ship
- LST 3016 or HMS Dieppe, an amphibious warfare ship of the Royal Navy

== Other uses ==
- Dieppe Raid, a 1942 World War II Allied attack on German forces in the French town
- Dieppe, the battle honour awarded to forces participating in the Dieppe Raid
- Dieppe (board game), a board wargame simulating the Dieppe Raid
- Dieppe (film), a 1993 Canadian miniseries about the raid

== See also ==
- Dieppe Commandos, an ice hockey team in Dieppe, New Brunswick
- Dieppe Centre-Lewisville a provincial electoral district in New Brunswick
- Dieppe-Memramcook, a former provincial electoral district in New Brunswick; since replaced by Memramcook-Lakeville-Dieppe
- Dieppe Gardens, a park in Windsor, Ontario
- Dieppe maps, a series of 16th-century world maps made in Dieppe, Seine-Maritime
- Johnny Depp, American actor of French Huguenot extraction (descendant of Pierre Dieppe)
