= TSMV Brading =

British passenger ferry (1948-1986)

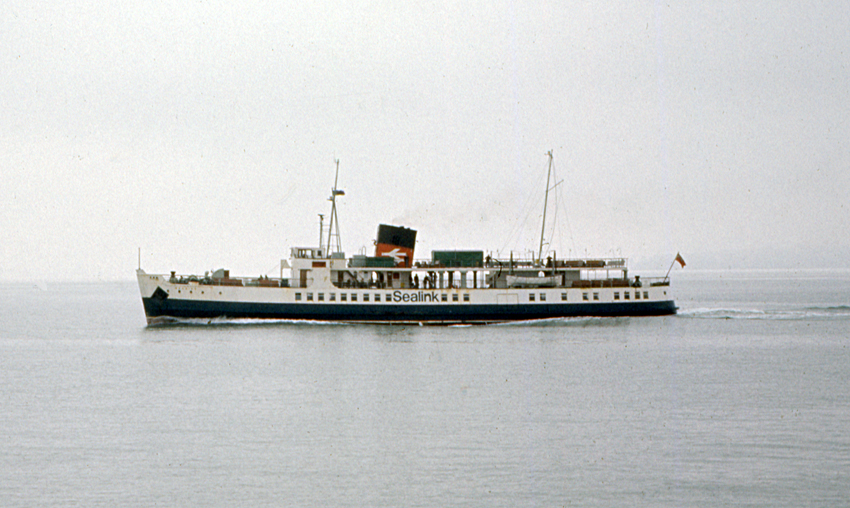
- Sealink ferry Brading

History

United Kingdom
- Name: TSMV Brading
- Operator: British Railways; Sealink
- Builder: William Denny and Brothers, Dumbarton
- Yard number: 1412
- Launched: 11 March 1948
- Completed: October 1948
- In service: 2 December 1948
- Out of service: 21 February 1986
- Identification: IMO number: 5050050
- Fate: Scrapped 1994

General characteristics
- Class & type: Twin Screw Motor Vessel Passenger Ferry
- Tonnage: 988
- Length: 200 feet (61 m)
- Beam: 46 feet (14 m)
- Draught: 7 feet (2.1 m)
- Propulsion: 2 x Sulzer 8 MD 32 two-stroke 950 bhp diesel engines
- Speed: 14.5 knots
- Capacity: 1135
- Crew: 33

TSMV Brading was a passenger ferry that operated between Portsmouth and the Isle of Wight between 1948 and 1986.

== Background and construction ==
Following the Second World War, Southern Railway, which operated passenger and vehicle ferry services to the Isle of Wight, decided to supplement and replace the existing coal burning paddle steamers that operated on the Portsmouth to Ryde route with modern twin screw diesel powered vessels.

Initial plans, incorrectly based on a predicted downward trend in passenger numbers, were to order the construction of two such vessels. These were to be the identical ships Southsea and Brading built by William Denny and Brothers in Dumbarton on Clydeside. They were launched on 11 March 1948 and went into service with British Railways, Brading being the second to enter service, on 2 December 1948. One of the existing paddle steamers, Merstone, was replaced (two having been sunk during World War II) and four were retained initially. The two ships were the first on the route to be fitted with radar which quickly proved itself in foggy conditions that had previously left the Isle of Wight cut off from the mainland.

Increasing numbers of passengers quickly led to the order for a third sister ship, Shanklin, in 1951. She entered service as a one-class ship and her two sisters became one-class at the same time. The ships all received a major overhaul in 1967 with an extra passenger deck, as a continuation of the bridge deck, and improved seating and catering facilities.

Brading and Southsea outlasted their newer sister on the Portsmouth to Ryde run, being replaced in 1986 by new catamaran-type ferries, Our Lady Pamela and Our Lady Patricia.

She was scrapped at Pounds Scrapyard in Portsmouth in 1994.

== Incidents ==
On 13 May 1960 a navy liberty boat, D11, was crossing Portsmouth harbour from Gosport to HMS Vernon with civilian workers on the way home. In attempting to avoid a yacht entering harbour it was run down by Brading on its way to Ryde. Four people from the boat were killed.

== See also ==
- British Railways ships
- Wightlink
