= TSMV Southsea =

British passenger ferry (1948-1988)

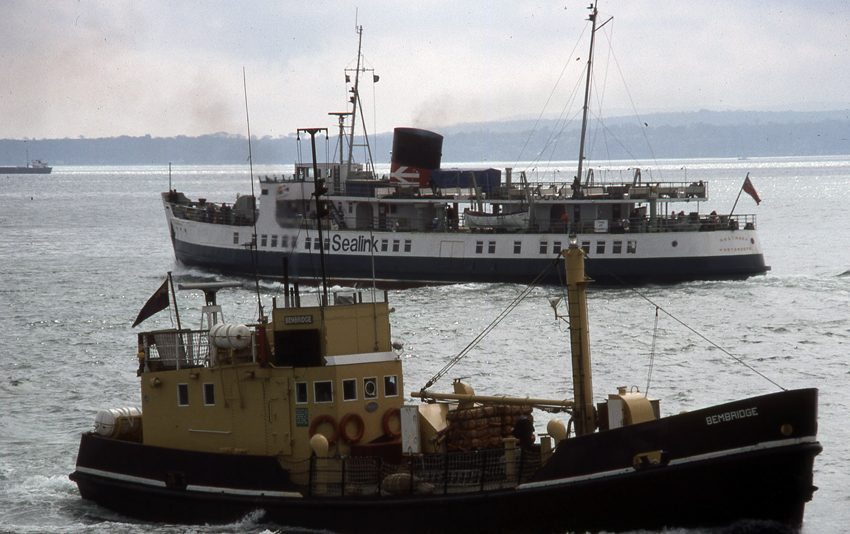
- Sealink ferry Southsea

History

United Kingdom
- Name: TSMV Southsea
- Operator: British Railways; Sealink
- Builder: William Denny and Brothers, Dumbarton
- Yard number: 1411
- Launched: 11 March 1948
- Completed: October 1948
- In service: 1 November 1948
- Out of service: 15 September 1988
- Identification: Callsign: MQCB; IMO number: 5335838
- Fate: Scrapped 2005

General characteristics
- Class & type: Twin Screw Motor Vessel Passenger Ferry
- Tonnage: 986
- Length: 200 feet (61 m)
- Beam: 46 feet (14 m)
- Draught: 7 feet (2.1 m)
- Propulsion: 2 x Sulzer 8 MD 32 two-stroke 950 bhp diesel engines
- Speed: 14.5 knots
- Capacity: 1135
- Crew: 33

TSMV Southsea was a passenger ferry that operated between Portsmouth and the Isle of Wight between 1948 and 1988.

== Background and construction ==
Following the Second World War, Southern Railway, which operated passenger and vehicle ferry services to the Isle of Wight, decided to supplement and replace the existing coal burning paddle steamers that operated on the Portsmouth to Ryde route with modern twin screw diesel powered vessels.

Initial plans, incorrectly based on a predicted downward trend in passenger numbers, were to order the construction of two such vessels. These were to be the identical ships Southsea and Brading built by William Denny and Brothers in Dumbarton on Clydeside. They were launched on 11 March 1948 and went into service with British Railways, Southsea being the first to enter service, on 1 November 1948. One of the existing paddle steamers, Merstone, was replaced (two having been sunk during World War II) and four were retained initially. The two ships were the first on the route to be fitted with radar which quickly proved itself in foggy conditions that had previously left the Isle of Wight cut off from the mainland.

Increasing numbers of passengers quickly led to the order for a third similar ship, Shanklin, in 1951. She entered service as a one-class ship and her two sisters became one-class at the same time. The ships all received a major overhaul in 1967 with an extra passenger deck, as a continuation of the bridge deck, and improved seating and catering facilities.

Brading and Southsea outlasted their newer sister on the Portsmouth to Ryde run, being replaced in 1986 by new catamaran-type ferries, Our Lady Pamela and Our Lady Patricia. Southsea was retained until 1987 as a backup, after which she operated pleasure cruises for two seasons. She was then earmarked for potential preservation, being laid up first at Falmouth and later at Drivers Wharf on the Itchen in Southampton. Ultimately the preservation attempt failed and she was eventually scrapped in 2005 in Esbjerg.

== See also ==
- British Railways ships
- Wightlink
