= MV Cowes Castle =

Former Isle of Wight car and passenger ferry

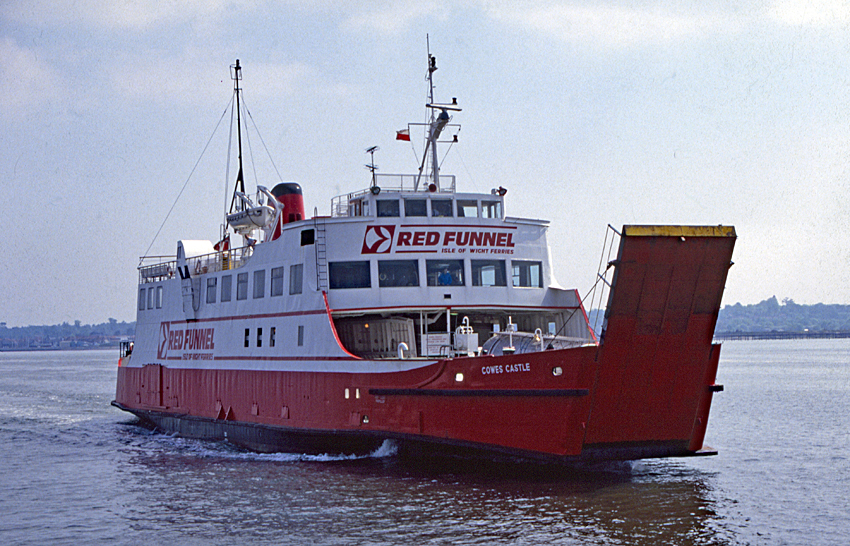
- Cowes Castle approaching Town Quay

History
- Name: Cowes Castle; Nehaj
- Owner: Red Funnel; Jadrolinija
- Port of registry: Southampton; Rijeka
- Route: Southampton–Cowes/East Cowes
- Builder: John I. Thornycroft & Company
- Yard number: 4209
- Launched: 11 November 1965
- Completed: 1965
- Maiden voyage: 15 December 1965
- Identification: IMO number: 6525002
- Fate: Scrapped 2008

General characteristics
- Class & type: Castle class Car ferry
- Tonnage: as built: 786 GT; after rebuild: 912 GT
- Length: as built: 191 ft 2 in (58.27 m); after rebuild: 221 feet (67 m)
- Beam: 42 ft (13 m)
- Installed power: 1,800 brake horsepower (1,300 kW)
- Propulsion: 2x 8 cyl Crossley Premier diesels driving twin screws
- Speed: 12 kn (22 km/h; 14 mph)

MV Cowes Castle was a car ferry operated by Red Funnel between Southampton and Cowes/East Cowes. Subsequently, sold to Jadrolinija in 1994 for further service in Croatia. She was scrapped in 2008.

== Design and construction ==
Ordered from John I. Thornycroft & Company and built at their Woolston shipyards, she was launched, on 11 November 1965, by the Governor of the Isle of Wight, Lady Brabourne, daughter of Lord Mountbatten of Burma. The third member of the company's Castle class, she was an improved version of the 1962 built Osborne Castle.

As originally built, she was 191 ft 2 in (58.27 m) long with a beam of 42 ft (13 m) and a capacity of 786 GT. Two Crossley Premier diesel engines driving twin screws gave her a maximum speed of 12 kn (22 km/h; 14 mph). She had a bow ramp for loading at slipways at each end of the route and side doors for loading from the pontoon at Cowes.

In September 1975, it was decided to convert her and her sister ship, Norris Castle, to drive through operation. Along with an increase in length, this increased her capacity by 25 to 30 cars. The conversion was carried out by Boele of Rotterdam and she reentered service on 15 December. After conversion, her length was increased to 221 feet (67 m) and her capacity to 912 GT. She was licensed to carry a maximum of 866 passengers and 65 cars or 22 lorries.

A gate was fitted at the stern, allowing her to utilise the link span at Southampton. She would load over the stern at Southampton and over the bow at East Cowes. A bow thruster was fitted in February 1976. Before this, she occasionally had trouble berthing at Southampton in high winds and was often assisted by the small tug, Bonchurch.

== History ==
In addition to her normal service operations, Cowes Castle undertook charter cruises, along with her sister ships. A regular event was the cruise to watch the firework display at the end of Cowes Week. She was also used as the venue for the annual general meetings of the company, moored at Royal Pier. On 16 May 1969 she was used for sightseeing cruises around Spithead for the 20th Anniversary revue of the NATO fleet by Elizabeth II.

=== Accidents and incidents ===
On 11 February 1971, arriving at Southampton in thick fog, she collided with the pontoon and ripped away one of the flotation tanks. There were no casualties but it was 30 minutes before her passengers could disembark.

=== Disposal ===
With the arrival of Red Falcon in 1994, she became surplus to requirements and was sold to Jadrolinija. She carried out a farewell cruise to Cowes and back on 18 March and her last service trip on 21 March. She departed for Croatia on 26 March, renamed Nehaj. After 14 years further service in the Adriatic Sea she was scrapped in 2008.
