= PS Premier =

British ship

History

United Kingdom
- Name: Premier
- Owner: Dumbarton Steamboat Co (1846–52); J Tizard (1852–60); Cosens & Co Ltd (1860–90); George E Elliot (1890– ); Cosens & Co Ltd ( –1938)
- Port of registry: Weymouth (from 1852)
- Builder: William Denny and Brothers
- Yard number: 6
- Launched: 1846
- Completed: 1847
- Identification: UK official number 6387; code letters JNPS
- Fate: Scrapped 1938

General characteristics
- Tonnage: after 1878: 129 GRT, 54 NRT
- Length: after 1878: 148.5 ft (45.3 m)
- Beam: 17.3 ft (5.3 m)
- Depth: 6.7 ft (2.0 m)
- Installed power: as built: 55 RHP; after 1878: 50 RHP
- Propulsion: after 1878: oscillating steam engine
- Notes: iron hull

PS Premier was a British paddle steamer that was noted for her longevity. She was built in Scotland in 1846, spent much of her career on the south coast of England and was scrapped in 1938.

== Building ==
William Denny and Brothers built Premier on the River Leven at Dumbarton in 1846. She had an iron hull and her paddles were driven by a 55 RHP engine made by a company called Steeple. The ship was registered on 5 February 1847.

== Career ==
Premier spent her first few years on the Firth of Clyde. The Dumbarton Steamboat Co operated her until 1852, when a J Tizard acquired her and re-registered her at Weymouth, Dorset.

Cosens & Co Ltd, who operated pleasure steamers from Weymouth, acquired Premier in 1860 Cosens rebuilt her in 1878 by inserting a new 65 feet (20 m) section amidships and replacing her original engine with a two-cylinder 50 RHP oscillating steam engine made by John Penn and Sons of Blackheath.

In 1890 a George E Elliot acquired Premier. But at some date she passed back to Cosens, whom Lloyd's Register records as her owner in 1930. The last Lloyd's Register in which she appears is for 1931. She was scrapped in 1938.
