= PS Southsea =

Passenger vessel built in 1930

History
- Name: PS Southsea
- Operator: Southern Railway
- Port of registry: (United Kingdom)
- Builder: Fairfield, Govan
- Yard number: 641
- Launched: 2 April 1930
- Fate: Mined and wrecked 16 February 1941

General characteristics
- Tonnage: 825 gross register tons (GRT)
- Length: 244 feet (74 m)
- Beam: 30.1 feet (9.2 m)
- Draught: 10.5 feet (3.2 m)

PS Southsea was a passenger vessel built for the Southern Railway in 1930. Requisitioned by the Royal Navy for war service, she was wrecked after hitting a naval mine in 1941.

== History ==
The ship was built by Fairfield, Govan and launched on 2 April 1930 She was one of an order for two new ships, the other being Whippingham.

She was deployed on the Portsmouth to Ryde ferry service, but as one of the largest vessels commissioned for the company, also operated excursions from Portsmouth.

In February 1940, Southsea was requisitioned by the Admiralty as a minesweeper, the conversion was carried out by Camper and Nicholson at Northam, Southampton. She went on to serve in the 8th Flotilla with the pennant number J.113. Working off the coast of North East England, in November 1940 she was credited with shooting down an enemy aircraft. She was mined at the mouth of the River Tyne on 16 February 1941 with the loss of two officers and five ratings. Although successfully run aground, she was declared wrecked.
