= PS Duchess of Kent =

History
- Name: 1897–1933: PS Duchess of Kent; 1933–1935: PS Clacton Queen; 1935–1937: PS Jubilee Queen
- Operator: 1897–1923: London and South Western Railway and London, Brighton and South Coast Railway; 1923–1933: Southern Railway; 1933–1935: New Medway Steam Packet Company; 1935–1936: Mersey and Blackpool Steamship Company; 1936–1937: Jubilee Shipping Company; 1937: S B Kelly
- Port of registry: (United Kingdom)
- Builder: Day, Summers and Company
- Launched: 1 July 1897
- Out of service: May 1937
- Fate: Scrapped 1937

General characteristics
- Tonnage: 399 gross register tons (GRT)
- Length: 195.4 feet (59.6 m)
- Beam: 26.1 feet (8.0 m)
- Draught: 9 feet (2.7 m)

PS Duchess of Kent was a passenger vessel built for the London and South Western Railway and London, Brighton and South Coast Railway in 1897.

== History ==
The ship was built by Day, Summers and Company of Southampton and launched on 1 July 1897 by Mrs R Brown, wife of the local Marine Superintendent, who named her after Princess Victoria of Saxe-Coburg-Saalfeld, the mother of Queen Victoria. She was constructed for a joint venture between the London and South Western Railway and the London, Brighton and South Coast Railway for the passenger trade to the Isle of Wight.

She was taken over in 1923 by the Southern Railway. They sold her to the New Medway Steam Packet Company Ltd in 1933 and she was renamed Clacton Queen. In November 1935 she was sold to the Mersey and Blackpool Steamship Company Ltd and renamed Jubilee Queen. Then she was sold to the Jubilee Shipping Company and then S B Kelly in July 1936. She was scrapped in June 1937 at Barrow in Furness.
