= PS Princess Elizabeth =

Former paddle-steamer, now restaurant in Dunkirk

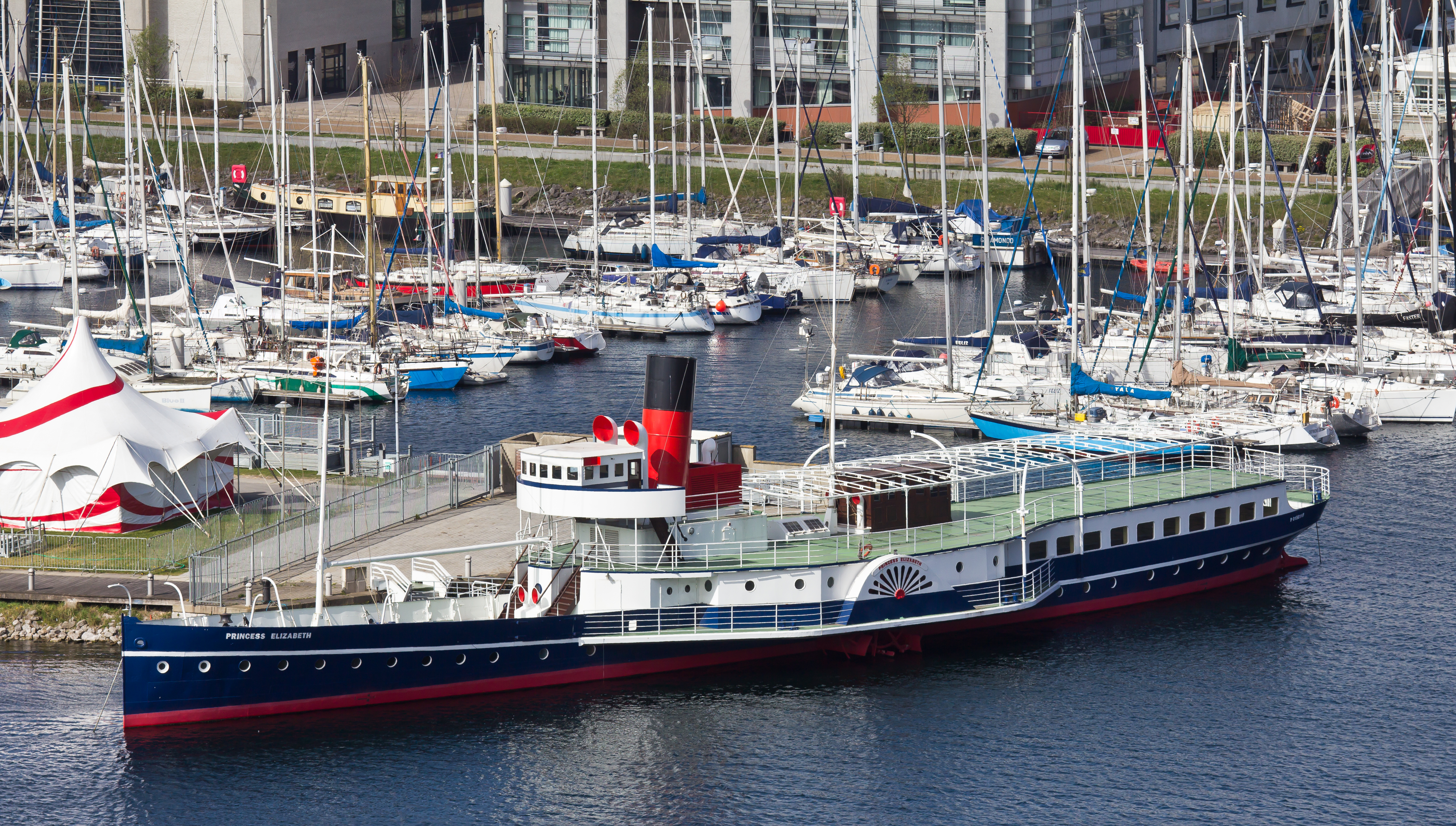
- PS Princess Elizabeth in the Port de Plaisance du Bassin de la Marine, Dunkerque

History
- Name: PS Princess Elizabeth (1926–1939); HMS Princess Elizabeth (1939–1944); PS Princess Elizabeth (1944–)
- Builder: Day, Summers and Company
- Launched: 2 June 1927
- Identification: Pennant number J111 (1939–1944)

General characteristics
- Tonnage: 388 GRT

PS Princess Elizabeth is a passenger-carrying paddle steamer which was built by Day, Summers and Company in 1927 for Southampton, Isle of Wight and South of England Royal Mail Steam Packet Company Limited, that is noted for being one of the Little Ships of Dunkirk, and is now a static floating restaurant in Dunkirk.

Named for the then newborn Princess Elizabeth the paddle steamer Princess Elizabeth originally entered service to carry passengers from Southampton and Bournemouth to Cowes on the Isle of Wight.

== Military service ==
With the outbreak of World War II like many paddlesteamers she was requisitioned by the British Admiralty to serve as a minesweeper. She was in the 12th Minesweeping flotilla with Duchess of Rothesay, Lorna Doone, Marmion, Oriole and Queen Empress.

On 29 May 1940 Princess Elizabeth was ordered to sail from Dover to assist with the Dunkirk evacuation. On her first trip she evacuated about 450 troops from La Panne beaches and disembarked them in Margate early the next morning. While in Margate they picked up four small boats as they had experienced problems ferrying troops from the beach to their ship with only the two small boats they regularly carried. On her second trip (30 May) she collected about 400 troops from La Panne, on her third (31 May) she rescued another 400 from Bray-Dunes and on her fourth and final trip (3 June) she retrieved about 380 troops from Dunkirk's east mole. Although the ship and crew were under fire multiple times during the operations, particularly on their third trip, they manage to avoid serious injury to either.

After Operation Dynamo the ship was purposed as an anti-aircraft vessel and after the war returned to her owners in 1944.

== Post war service ==
In 1957 the BBC broadcast a musical programme called Pleasure Boat from the ship while it sailed on The Solent.

In 1965 she became a floating casino. Then later a floating pub and restaurant on the River Thames. Then an exhibition and conference centre in Paris. Finally she was moved to Dunkirk in 1999. In 2017 the ship appeared in Christopher Nolan’s film Dunkirk.

The ship's bell was sold at Bonhams auction house in 2011 for £456 including premium.
