= PS Portsdown =

Southern Railway paddle steamer (1928–1941)

History
- Name: PS Portsdown
- Operator: Southern Railway
- Port of registry: (United Kingdom)
- Builder: Caledon Shipbuilding & Engineering Company, Dundee
- Yard number: 320
- Launched: 23 March 1928
- Fate: Mined and sunk 20 September 1941

General characteristics
- Tonnage: 342 gross register tons (GRT)
- Length: 190 feet (58 m)
- Beam: 25.1 feet (7.7 m)
- Draught: 8.7 feet (2.7 m)

PS Portsdown was a passenger vessel built for the Southern Railway in 1928. She was one of the civilian ships that participated in the Dunkirk evacuation in 1940 and was sunk by a naval mine a year later.

== History ==
The ship was built by Caledon Shipbuilding of Dundee and launched on 24 March 1928.

Portsdown was retained on the Portsmouth to Ryde run during the Second World War along with her sister ship Merstone. However, on 1 June 1940, she was employed as a naval transport ship and went unarmed to Dunkirk, where she used her own boats to load men from the beach, later putting her bow into the shore to rescue others. She returned to Ramsgate with 618 men. Portsdown hit a mine on 20 September 1941 at Spithead and sank with the loss of 23 lives
