= PS Duchess of Norfolk =

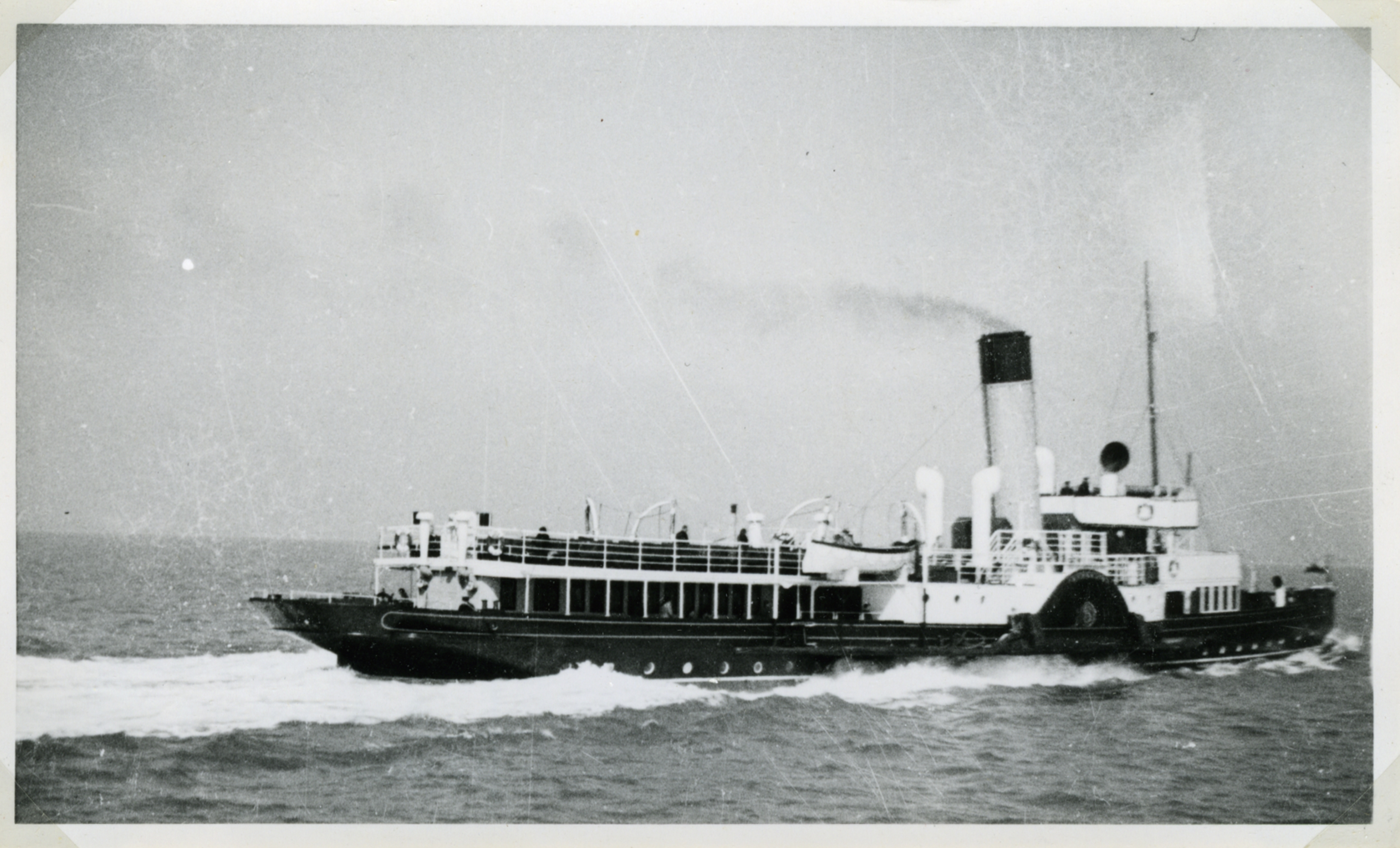

History
- Name: PS Duchess of Norfolk (1911-16); HMS Duchess of Norfolk (1916-20); PS Duchess of Norfolk (1920-37); PS Embassy (1937-39); HMS Ambassador (1939-45); PS Embassy (1945-67)
- Owner: London, Brighton and South Coast Railway / London and South Western Railway (joint owners, 1911-16); Royal Navy (1916-20); London, Brighton and South Coast Railway / London and South Western Railway (joint owners, 1920-22); Southern Railway (1923-37); Cosens & Co (1937-39); Royal Navy (1939-45); Cosens & Co (1945-67)
- Port of registry: (United Kingdom) Portsmouth (1911-16); (United Kingdom) Royal Navy (1916-20); (United Kingdom) Portsmouth (1920-37); (United Kingdom) Weymouth (1937-39); (United Kingdom) Royal Navy (1939-45); (United Kingdom) Weymouth (1945-67)
- Route: Portsmouth - Ryde (1911 - 14, 1918-37); Bournemouth - Swanage / Portsmouth / Isle of Wight (1937-39, 1946-47, 1949-66); Weymouth - Swanage / Portsmouth / Isle of Wight (1948)
- Builder: D & W Henderson & Co, Glasgow
- Yard number: 475
- Launched: 25 July 1911
- Completed: August 1911
- Out of service: 22 September 1966
- Identification: United Kingdom Official Number 131994; IMO Number 5510305 ( -1967); Code Letters MBQN
- Fate: Scrapped, June 1967

General characteristics
- Tonnage: 381 GRT
- Length: 190 ft (57.91 m)
- Beam: 26 ft 1 in (7.95 m)
- Depth: 8 ft 7 in (2.62 m)
- Installed power: Compound steam engine
- Propulsion: Paddle wheels
- Speed: 13.5 kn (25.0 km/h; 15.5 mph)

Duchess of Norfolk was a 381 GRT paddle steamer built in 1911 for the London, Brighton and South Coast Railway and London and South Western Railway, who operated a joint service to the Isle of Wight. She was requisitioned by the Royal Navy for use as minesweeper HMS Duchess of Norfolk during the First World War, returning to her owners after the war ended. She passed to the Southern Railway on 1 January 1923.

In 1937, she was sold to Cosens & Co Ltd and renamed Embassy. During the Second World War, she was again requisitioned for use as a minesweeper, this time being named HMS Ambassador. Postwar she was returned to her owners, and regained her former name Embassy. She served until 1966. She was scrapped in 1967.

== Description ==
The ship was built by D & W Henderson Ltd, Glasgow. She was yard number 475 and was launched on 25 July 1911 with completion in August 1911. The ship was 190 feet (57.91 m) long, with a beam of 26 feet 1 inch (7.95 m) and a depth of 8 feet 7 inches (2.62 m). She was powered by a compound steam engine, which had cylinders of 27 inches (69 cm) and 51 inches (130 cm) bore by 54 inches (140 cm) stroke. This could propel her at a speed of 13.5 knots (25.0 km/h).

== History ==
Duchess of Norfolk was built for the London, Brighton and South Coast Railway and the London and South Western Railway. She was used on their Portsmouth - Ryde route. Her port of registry was Portsmouth. In May 1916, Duchess of Norfolk was requisitioned by the Royal Navy for use as a minesweeper in the Mediterranean. She was returned to her owners in July 1920 and refitted before resuming service. She passed to the Southern Railway at Grouping.

In 1937, Duchess of Norfolk was replaced by Ryde. She was sold to Cosens & Co Ltd and was renamed Embassy. She was refitted before entering service. Her port of registry was changed to Weymouth. She was used for day trips from Bournemouth. During the Second World War, Embassy was requisitioned by the Royal Navy for use as a minesweeper, HMS Ambassador. Postwar, she was returned to Cosens & Co, and regained her former name. Embassy was refitted, with a larger wheelhouse and extended deck shelters, re-entering service in 1946. She was converted to oil firing during the winter of 1946-47. Embassy was used for day trips from Bournemouth, except for the 1948 season when she was based at Weymouth. In 1966, Embassy developed mechanical problems, including a damaged paddle wheel. She operated her final service on 22 September of that year. She was sold for scrap, and departed Weymouth under tow on 25 May 1967, bound for Ghent, Belgium. She was scrapped at Boom, where she arrived on 28 May 1967.

== Official Number and code letters ==
Official Numbers were a forerunner to IMO Numbers. Duchess of Norfolk and Embassy had the United Kingdom Official Number 131994 and used the Code Letters MBQN. Towards the end of her life, Embassy was allocated IMO Number 5510305.
