= PS Duchess of Richmond =

History
- Name: PS Duchess of Richmond
- Operator: London and South Western Railway and London, Brighton and South Coast Railway
- Port of registry: (United Kingdom)
- Builder: D and W Henderson, Glasgow
- Yard number: 471
- Launched: 11 June 1910
- Fate: Sunk 28 June 1919 by a mine in the Aegean Sea

General characteristics
- Tonnage: 365 gross register tons (GRT)
- Length: 190.2 feet (58.0 m)
- Beam: 26.1 feet (8.0 m)
- Draught: 8.7 feet (2.7 m)

PS Duchess of Richmond was a passenger vessel built for the London and South Western Railway and London, Brighton and South Coast Railway in 1910.

== History ==
The ship was built by D and W Henderson of Glasgow and launched on 11 June 1910. She was constructed for a joint venture between the London and South Western Railway and the London, Brighton and South Coast Railway for the passenger trade to the Isle of Wight.

On 25 June 1911 she collided with the pinnace of the Swedish warship Flygia which was bringing men ashore on leave. The pinnace was smashed and the crew thrown into the water, but all were rescued.

She was requisitioned by the Admiralty as HMS Duchess of Richmond a minesweeper during the First World War. On 28 June 1919 she struck a mine and sank in the Aegean Sea.
