= PS Duchess of Edinburgh (1884) =

History
- Name: PS Duchess of Edinburgh
- Operator: London and South Western Railway and London, Brighton and South Coast Railway
- Port of registry: (United Kingdom)
- Builder: Aitken and Mansel, Whiteinch
- Yard number: 128
- Launched: 10 April 1884
- Out of service: 1910
- Identification: Official number 87432
- Fate: Scrapped 1910

General characteristics
- Tonnage: 342 gross register tons (GRT)
- Length: 190.6 feet (58.1 m)
- Beam: 26.1 feet (8.0 m)
- Depth: 8.8 feet (2.7 m)

PS Duchess of Edinburgh was a passenger vessel built for the London and South Western Railway and London, Brighton and South Coast Railway in 1884.

== History ==
The ship was built in steel by Aitken and Mansel and launched on 10 April 1884. She was constructed for a joint venture between the London and South Western Railway and the London, Brighton and South Coast Railway. The engines were provided by J and J Thomson of Glasgow, with a pair of fixed diagonal surface condensing engines, the cylinders of which were 32 inches (81 cm) and 55 inches (140 cm) in diameter, the stroke being 5 feet (1.5 m). Steam was provided from four steel boilers which could produce 110 lbs per square inch. The design of the vessel was overseen by Mr Stroudley, engineer of the London, Brighton and South Coast Railway.

She went on a trial trip on 28 June 1884 on which she achieved a mean speed of 14.5 knots.

She was scrapped in 1910.
