= Cosens & Co =

British excursion steamer and marine engineering company

Cosens & Co Ltd
- Industry: shipping
- Founded: 1848
- Founder: Joseph Cosens
- Defunct: 1996
- Headquarters: Weymouth, United Kingdom
- Area served: South Coast
- Services: Tourism, ship repair and marine engineering

Cosens & Co Ltd was a British excursion steamer and marine engineering company based in Weymouth.

== History ==
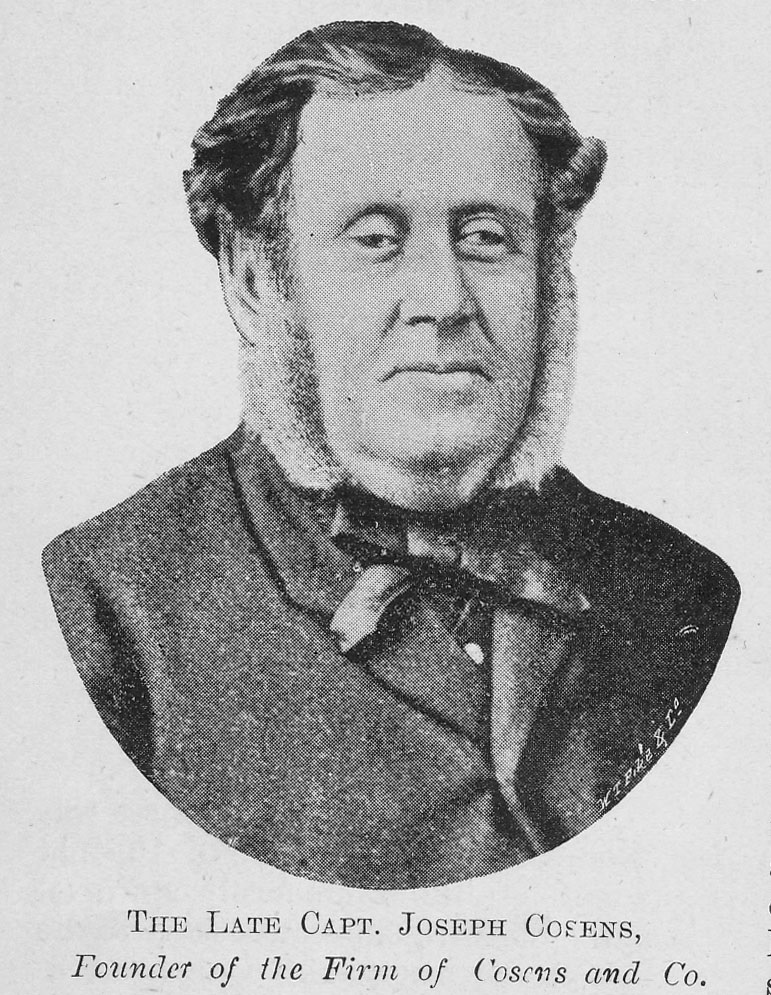
Joseph Cosens, about 1870

The company was founded in 1848 by Joseph Cosens and incorporated in 1876. It operated a fleet of paddle steamers on excursions along the south coast of England and on cross channel trips to Cherbourg and Alderney. It also operated a number of launches offering "trips round the bay" as well as tugs serving ships using Weymouth harbour. Up to the end of World War I the company held the Admiralty contract to operate liberty boats for naval ships at Portland. The engineering side of the company was a major ship repair and marine engineering facility. The company also had a cold storage and ice-making facility adjacent to the port.

In 1851 Joseph Cosens was operating the steamer Princess between Weymouth and Portland, when he found that a rival organisation, the Weymouth & Portland Steam Packet Company, owned by Philip Dodson, intended placing its own steamer Contractor on the same route. Cosens' response to this was to expand the company by going into partnership with wealthy local newspaper proprietor, Joseph Drew, in order to obtain a new ship. The new ship, named Prince, was designed and built by John Scott Russell, famous later as the builder of the ill-fated Great Eastern.

Joseph Cosens died at the end of 1873 and Joseph Drew became chairman.

In 1946 Cosens was taken over by its Southampton based rival Red Funnel which continued to operate the pleasure steamers, in conjunction with its own, until 1966 when the last surviving paddle steamer was withdrawn from service. The engineering division continued however, finally being sold in a management buy-out in 1990. Renamed Cosens Engineering Ltd it had a brief independent career that ended in receivership.

== Fleet ==
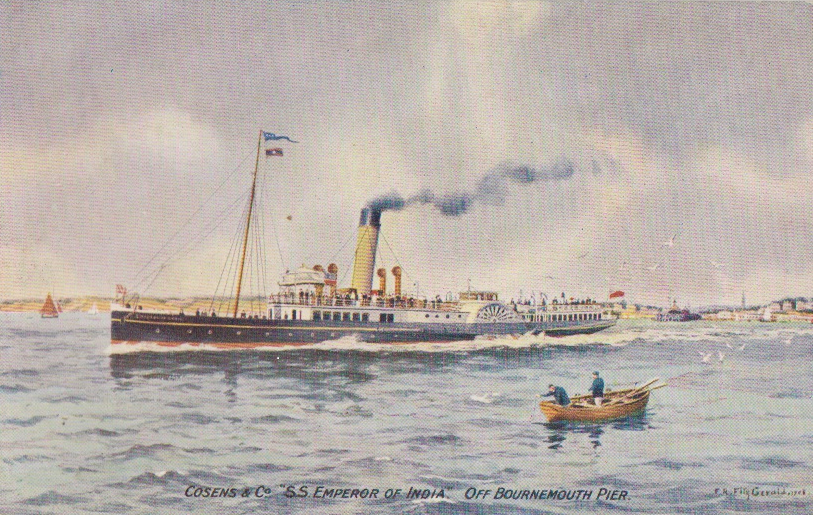
Emperor of India off Bournemouth Pier in 1908

Ship	Service	Notes
PS Highland Maid	1848	On charter
PS Princess	1848–1853	
PS Prince	1852–1888	
PS Contractor	1858–1863	Taken over from P Dodson
PS Ocean Bride	1858–1865	Taken over from P Dodson
PS Bannockburn	1860–1865	
PS Premier	1852–1938	
PS Wave Queen	1852	On charter
PS Commodore	1863–1890	
PS Empress	1879–1955	Featured in the 1946 film adaptation of Great Expectations.
PS Queen	1883–1920	
PS Victoria	1884–1953	
PS Monarch (I)	1888–1950	
PS Albert Victor	1889–1928	ex Lass o' Gowrie. Tug.
PS Prince George	1898–1928	
PS Majestic	1901–1916	Served as 0108 HMS Majestic II in World War I. Lost while minesweeping off Oran.
PS Brodick Castle	1901–1910	ex Buchanan Clyde steamer. Sold and renamed Paca Nova. Sank under tow off Portland Bill en route to Argentina.
PS Emperor of India	1908–1957	ex Princess Royal. Bought from Red Funnel. Served as HMS Mahratta in World War I. Served as J106 HMS Emperor of India in World War 2 and was present at Dunkirk.
PS Helper	1910-1920	Ex GWR Sir Francis Drake. Purchased to replace Brodick Castle .
PS Audrey	1911	On charter
PS Lord Roberts	1911	On charter
PS Melcombe Regis	1913–1920	ex Lune. Bought from the Lancashire and Yorkshire Railway
PS Alexandra (1879)	1915–1931	ex Portsmouth & Ryde service. Sold to breakers then resold as Showboat. Scrapped 1934.
PS Embassy	1937–1967	ex Duchess of Norfolk. Bought from the Southern Railway. Served as J109 HMS Ambassador in World War II. The last ship in company service.
PS Consul	1937–1963	ex Duke of Devonshire. Bought from Alexander Taylor of Torquay. Served as an examination vessel at Weymouth in World War II. Sold in 1963 for use along the Sussex coast. in 1965 she was adapted for use as an accommodation ship at Dartmouth and reverted to her original name. Scrapped in 1968.
PS Monarch (II)	1951–1961	ex Shanklin. Bought from the British Transport Commission, Portsmouth

Cosens' archive collection is extensive, and available to view at the Dorset history Centre, Dorchester https://archive-catalogue.dorsetcouncil.gov.uk/

== Bibliography ==
- Adams, Keith (2010). Red Funnel 150. Richard Danielson. ISBN 978-0-9513155-5-2.
- Clammer, Richard (2005). Cosens of Weymouth, 1848–1918. Witney: Black Dwarf Publications. ISBN 1-903599-14-8.
- Clammer, Richard (2001). Cosens of Weymouth, 1918–1996. Truro: Twelveheads Press. ISBN 9780906294482.
- Divine, David (1959). The Nine Days of Dunkirk. Pan Books. p. 295.
- Gladwell, Andrew (2013). Cosens Pleasure Steamers. Stroud: Amberley. ISBN 978-1-4456-1450-2.
- Lenton, HT; Colledge, JJ (1962). Warships of World War 2. Vol. Part 4 – Auxiliary Fighting Vessels. Ian Allan Publishing. p. 341.
