= PS Duchess of Albany =

History
- Name: PS Duchess of Albany
- Operator: 1889–1923: London and South Western Railway and London, Brighton and South Coast Railway; 1923–1928: Southern Railway
- Port of registry: (United Kingdom)
- Builder: Scotts, Greenock
- Yard number: 271
- Launched: 7 November 1889
- Out of service: 1928
- Fate: Scrapped 1928

General characteristics
- Tonnage: 256 gross register tons (GRT)
- Length: 170.4 feet (51.9 m)
- Beam: 22.1 feet (6.7 m)

PS Duchess of Albany was a passenger vessel built for the London and South Western Railway and London, Brighton and South Coast Railway in 1889.

== History ==
The ship was built by Scotts of Greenock and launched on 7 November 1889. She was constructed for a joint venture between the London and South Western Railway and the London, Brighton and South Coast Railway for the passenger trade to the Isle of Wight. She was named after Princess Helen of Waldeck and Pyrmont.

Occasionally she also undertook excursion runs, for example on 28 June 1890 there was an advertised trip from Portsmouth, Southsea and Ryde to Bournemouth. The fare was 2s 6d (equivalent to £17.38 in 2023) (excluding Pier Tolls).

In 1923 she passed to the Southern Railway and was scrapped in 1928.
