= MV Norris Castle (1968) =

Former Isle of Wight car and passenger ferry

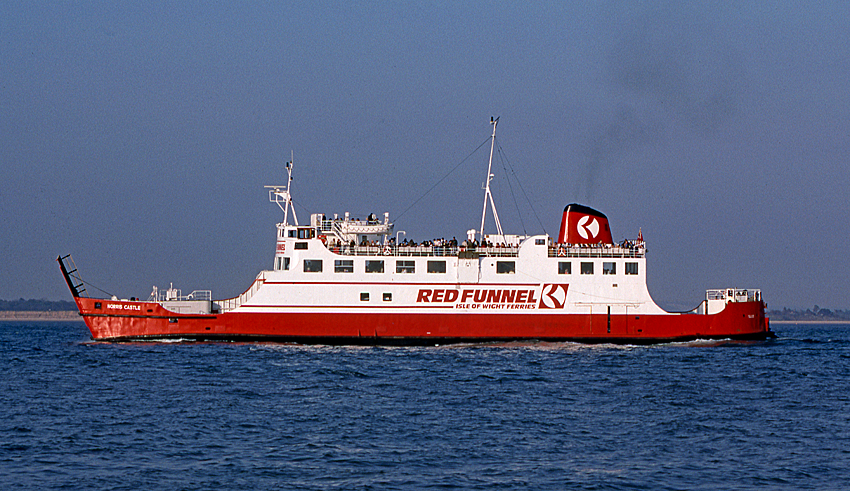
- Norris Castle, Red Funnel car ferry in the Solent

History
- Name: Norris Castle; Lovrejenac
- Owner: Red Funnel; Jadrolinija
- Port of registry: Southampton
- Route: Southampton–Cowes/East Cowes
- Ordered: October 1967
- Builder: John I Thornycroft & Company
- Yard number: 4226
- Launched: 8 August 1968
- Maiden voyage: 19 December 1968
- Identification: IMO number: 6826951
- Status: Laid up 2008

General characteristics
- Class & type: Castle class car ferry
- Tonnage: as built: 734 GT; after rebuild: 999 GT
- Length: as built: 191 feet 3 inches (58.29 m); after rebuild: 221 feet 2 inches (67.41 m)
- Beam: 42 feet 1 inch (12.83 m)
- Installed power: 1,800 brake horsepower (1,300 kW)
- Propulsion: 2x Crossley Premier diesels driving twin screws
- Speed: 12 kn (22 km/h; 14 mph)

MV Norris Castle, the third vessel in the Red Funnel fleet to carry the name, was built in 1968 by John I Thornycroft & Company at Woolston and operated as a car ferry between Southampton and East Cowes until 1994. Mrs Joan Lacon, owner of the namesake building, Norris Castle, named the ship. Originally designed to load and discharge through the bows, in 1976, she was converted to drive through operation, with mezzanine decks and an extended superstructure, by Boele in Rotterdam. As built, she was 191 feet 3 inches (58.29 m) long with a capacity of 734 GT. After rebuilding she was extended to 221 feet 2 inches (67.41 m) and 999 GT.

With the arrival of Red Osprey in 1994, she was surplus to requirements and sold to Jadrolinija for service in Croatia. She was renamed Lovrjenac. After 14 years further service, she was laid up in 2008.

== Accidents and incidents ==
In gale-force winds in 1981, when turning in the River Medina in the Isle of Wight, she was blown on to the Cowes Floating Bridge, but there was no serious damage done to either vessel.
