= Day, Summers and Company =

- Industry: Engineering
- Founded: 1834
- Founder: William Alltoft Summers, John Thomas Groves, Charles Arthur Day, William Baldock
- Headquarters: Millbrook, Southampton, then Northam, Southampton, England
- Products: Locomotives and shipbuilding

Day, Summers and Company was a British steam locomotive manufacturer and shipbuilder in the Southampton area. The company's history is complex and involves five men: William Alltoft Summers, John Thomas Groves, Charles Arthur Day, William Baldock and Nathaniel Ogle.

== Forerunners ==
Summers and Ogle's 1830 patent, "Specification of William Alltoft Summers and Nathaniel Ogle: Steam-engine and Other Boilers" was published by the Queen's Print Office in 1854.

In around 1830 or 1831, Summers and Ogle, based at the Iron Foundry, Millbrook, Southampton, made two, three-wheeled steam carriages.

In 1831, Ogle gave evidence on the steam carriage to the "Select Committee of the House of Commons on Steam Carriages".

In 1832, one of the steam carriages travelled, via Oxford, to Birmingham and Liverpool.

A June 1833 newspaper report described a demonstration in London:

On Saturday last Mr Nathaniel Ogle, accompanied by several ladies, together with Mr Babbage, Mr C Bischoff, Mr Macgary, Mr G Burdett, and other gentlemen, proceeded by his steam-carriage from the Bazaar in King-street, Portman-square, to call on Mr Rothschild at his residence at Stamford-hill. The vehicle, although it has been rattled over the roads nearly six hundred miles, is in efficient condition. A small quantity of waste steam was perceptible at first, until the boilers and casing were hot. The distance, full seven miles, was cleared, notwithstanding the crowded state of the roads, in thirty-one minutes, and the sudden and narrow ascent to Mr Rothschild's made with perfect precision, which was hardly to be expected from so long and ponderous a vehicle. The party was most urbanely and kindly received by Mr and Mrs Rothschild, and, after having partaken of refreshments, returned to Baker-street.

In 1834, two companies were founded at Millbrook. They were Summers, Day and Baldock and Summers, Groves and Day. In 1837, both companies moved to Northam, Southampton.

== Day, Summers and Company ==
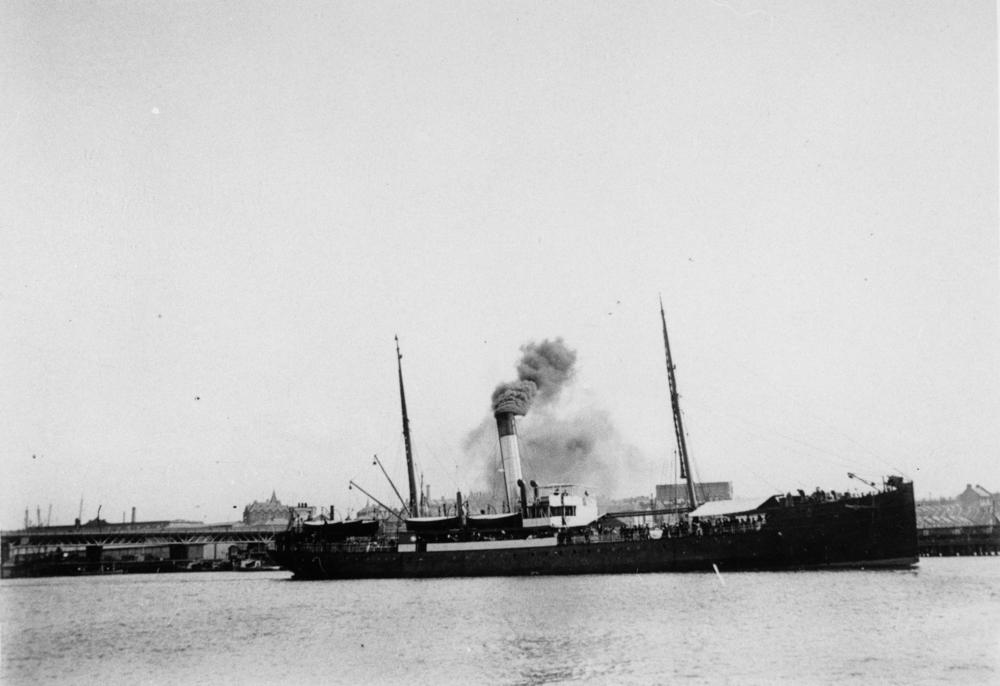
Day, Summers & Co built the cargo steamship Tyrian in 1890.

Groves left in 1845 and Baldock left in 1854. At some point the two companies merged and became Day, Summers and Company.

The first locomotive was "Jefferson" built in 1837, a 2-2-0 for the Richmond, Fredericksburg and Potomac Railroad in America.

Its engines were generally of the Stephenson "Planet" type. A further 2-2-0 was built in 1839 for the London and Greenwich Railway. This was modified soon after delivery by the addition of a trailing axle making it 2-2-2.

Two more locomotives were built for the London and Southampton Railway and two for Bourne, Bartley and Company. Of the latter, one was sold on to the North Union Railway and the other to the Bolton and Leigh Railway. Both were withdrawn before 1846.

When the London and South Western Railway opened in 1838, Summers Grove and Day carried out much of its repair work into the 1850s, complementing Nine Elms Locomotive Works at the other end of the line.

Other new engines may have been built, but known surviving records are sparse.

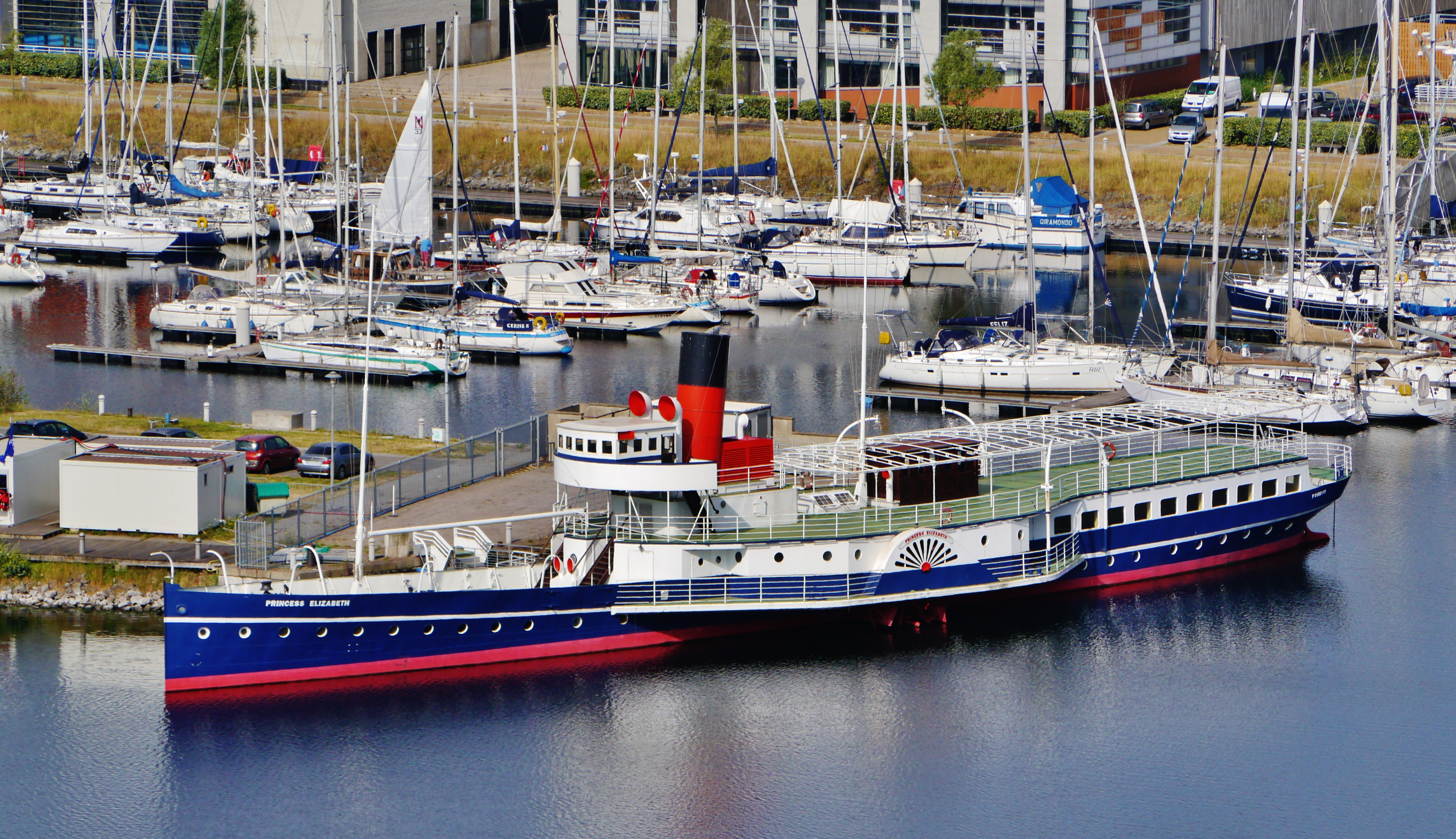
Day, Summers & Co built PS Princess Elizabeth in 1927
