= PS Shanklin =

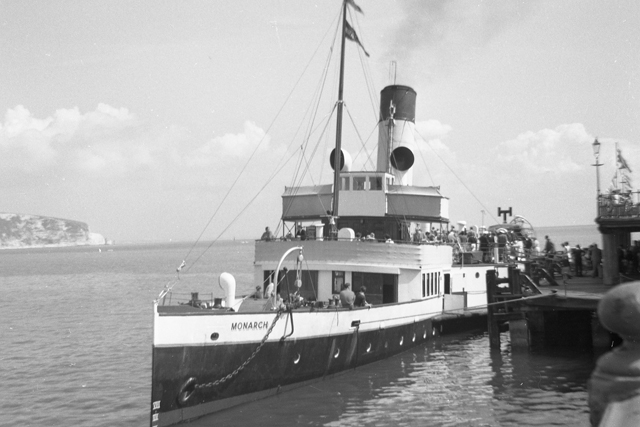
- As Monarch at Swanage Pier

History
- Name: 1924–1951: PS Shanklin; 1951–1961: PS Monarch
- Operator: 1924–1951: Southern Railway; 1951–1961: Cosens & Co Ltd
- Port of registry: (United Kingdom)
- Route: Portsmouth Harbour to Ryde Pier
- Builder: John I. Thornycroft & Company Southampton
- Launched: 6 June 1924
- Maiden voyage: 3 October 1924
- Out of service: 1961
- Fate: Scrapped 1961

General characteristics
- Tonnage: 412 gross register tons (GRT)
- Length: 190 feet (58 m)
- Beam: 26.1 feet (8.0 m)
- Draught: 8.7 feet (2.7 m)
- Speed: 13.5 knots (25.0 km/h; 15.5 mph)
- Capacity: 756 passengers

PS Shanklin was a passenger vessel built for the Southern Railway in 1924 for use on the Portsmouth Harbour to Ryde Pier route.

== History ==
The ship was built by John I. Thornycroft & Company of Southampton and launched in 1924. She was fitted with first and second class passenger saloons heated and ventilated by the inductor thermotank system. The main saloon was of light polished oak and the smoking saloon was of dark polished oak, underneath which was the dining saloon. The saloon had upholstered seating and the floor was covered with Ruboleum tiling. Instead of electro-plate or brass, the fittings throughout were made of Roanoid, a material similar to Bakelite. She operated the passenger service from Portsmouth Harbour to Ryde Pier with her first trip being on 3 October 1924.

She made her last trip on 30 November 1950 before being put up for sale in Southampton.

She was sold to Cosens & Co Ltd in 1951 and renamed Monarch. She was operated by them for ten years until scrapped in 1961.
