= PS Princess Margaret =

History
- Name: PS Princess Margaret
- Operator: 1893–1923: London and South Western Railway and London, Brighton and South Coast Railway; 1923–1928: Southern Railway
- Port of registry: (United Kingdom)
- Builder: Scotts, Greenock
- Yard number: 311
- Launched: 17 April 1893
- Out of service: 1928
- Fate: Scrapped 1928

General characteristics
- Tonnage: 260 gross register tons (GRT)
- Length: 170.6 feet (52.0 m)
- Beam: 22.1 feet (6.7 m)

PS Princess Margaret was a passenger vessel built for the London and South Western Railway and London, Brighton and South Coast Railway in 1893.

== History ==
The ship was built by Scotts of Greenock and launched on 14 April 1893. She was constructed for a joint venture between the London and South Western Railway and the London, Brighton and South Coast Railway for the passenger trade to the Isle of Wight.

On 10 March 1910 she was in collision with the destroyer HMS Crane. The destroyer's bows were badly smashed.

In 1912 a strong flood tide carried her against the flagship HMS Victory. Her stern was slightly twisted, and the Victory's companion ladder was damaged.

On 6 December 1920 she damaged her stern in a collision with the destroyer HMS Tarpon.

In 1923 she passed to the Southern Railway and was scrapped in 1928.
