= PS Duchess of Fife (1899) =

History
- Name: PS Duchess of Fife
- Operator: London and South Western Railway and London, Brighton and South Coast Railway
- Port of registry: (United Kingdom)
- Builder: Clydebank Engineering and Shipbuilding Company
- Yard number: 350
- Launched: 28 April 1899
- Out of service: 1929
- Fate: Scrapped 1929

General characteristics
- Tonnage: 443 gross register tons (GRT)
- Length: 215 feet (66 m)
- Beam: 26.1 feet (8.0 m)
- Draught: 9.5 feet (2.9 m)

PS Duchess of Fife was a passenger vessel built for the London and South Western Railway and London, Brighton and South Coast Railway in 1899.

== History ==
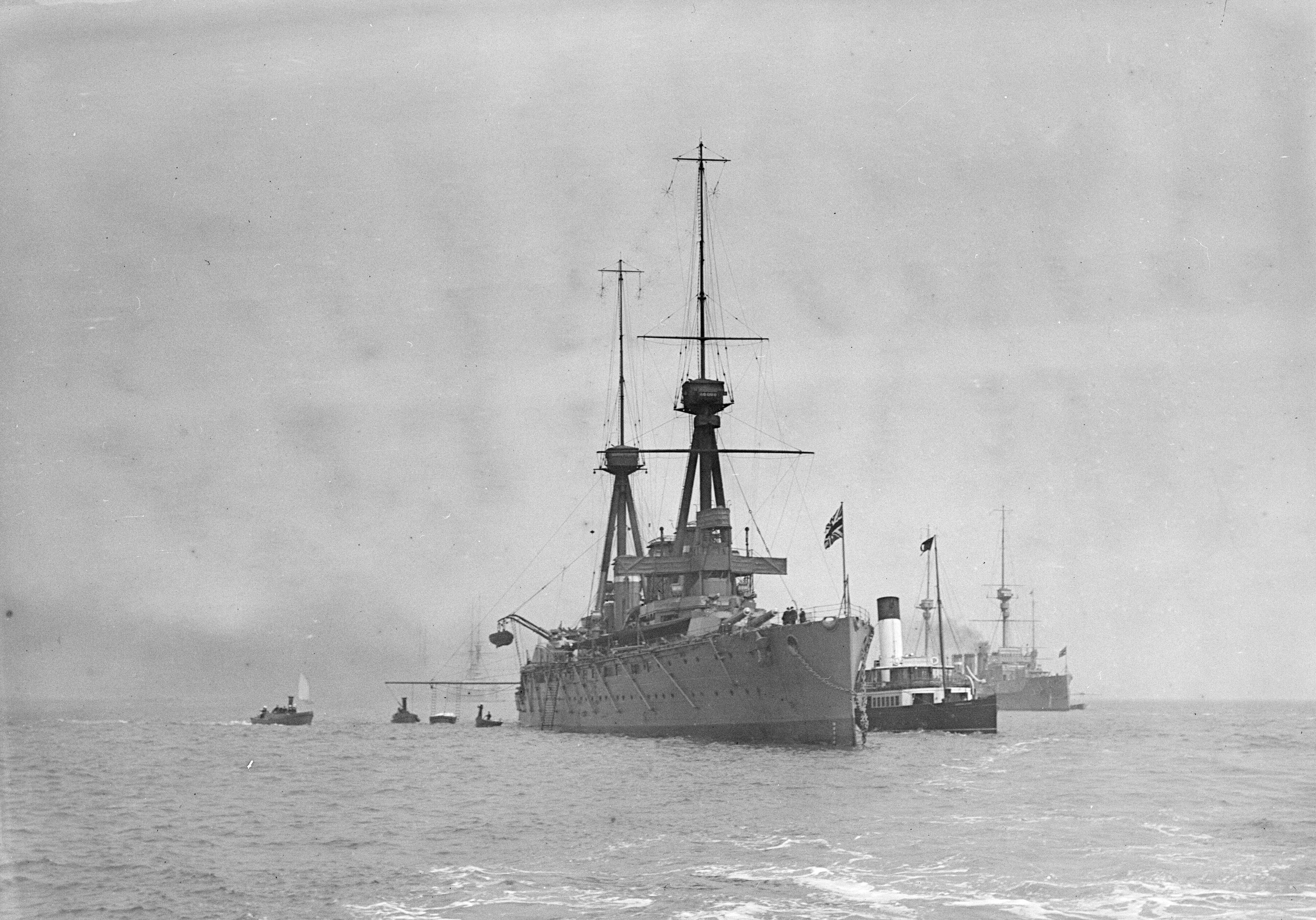
HMS Invincible anchored at Spithead, with on her port broadside the passenger paddle steamer Duchess of Fife

The ship was built by the Clydebank Engineering and Shipbuilding Company and launched on 28 April 1899 by Miss Brown, daughter of the Marine Superintendent of the railway companies. She was constructed for a joint venture between the London and South Western Railway and the London, Brighton and South Coast Railway for the passenger trade to the Isle of Wight.

She was taken over in 1923 by the Southern Railway. She was withdrawn in 1928 and sold for breaking by G.B. Pas and Sons in Bolnes in 1929.
