= Red Osprey =

Isle of Wight car and passenger ferry

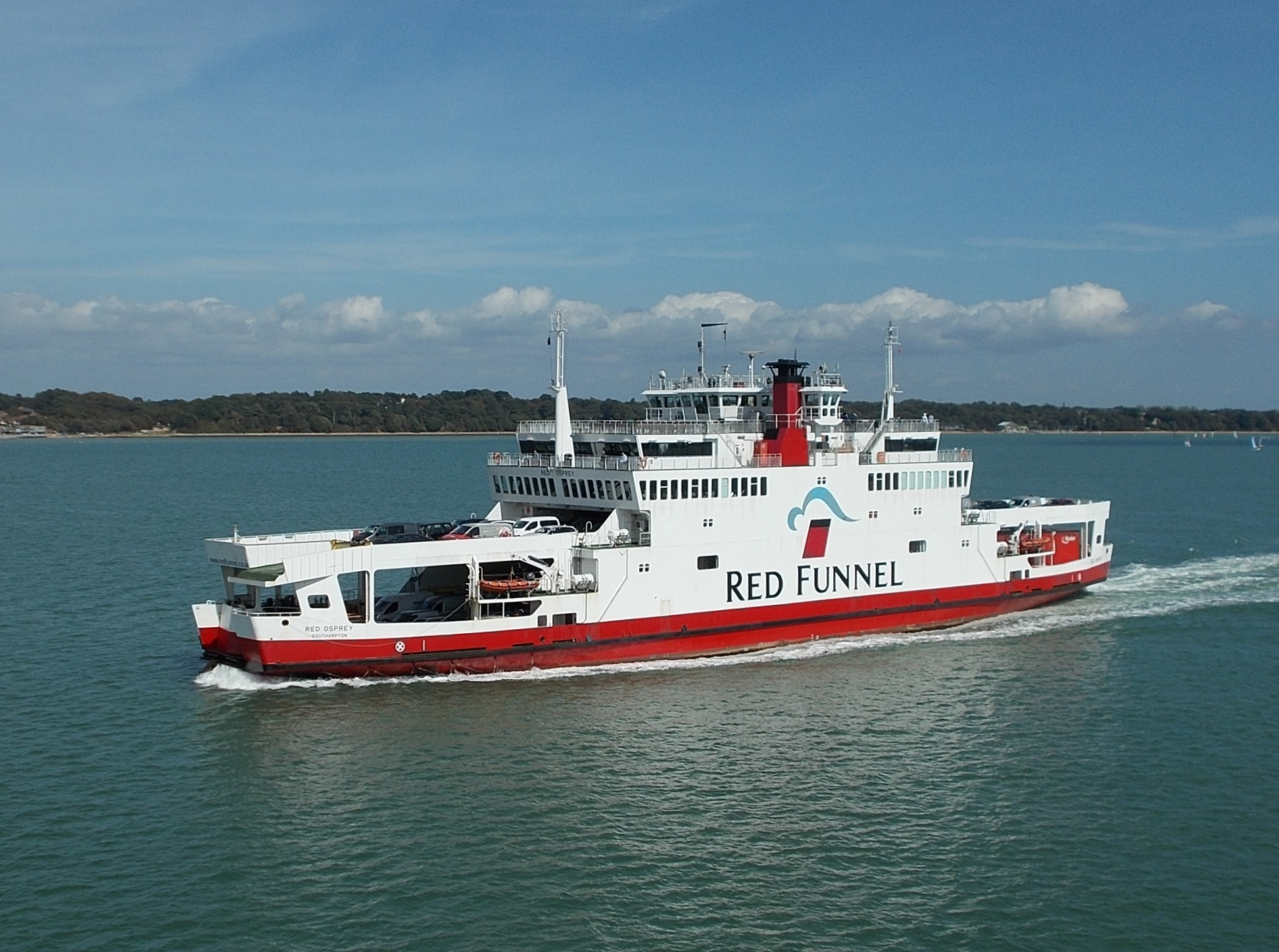
- Red Osprey in Southampton Water, 2019

History

United Kingdom
- Name: MV Red Osprey
- Operator: Red Funnel
- Builder: Ferguson Shipbuilders
- Launched: 28 April 1994
- In service: Oct 1994 - Sept 2003, Jan 2004 - Jan 2015, April 2015 -
- Identification: IMO number: 9064059
- Status: In service

General characteristics
- Class & type: Raptor Class Car Passenger Ferry
- Tonnage: 3,953 GT
- Length: 93.22 m (305.8 ft)
- Beam: 17.5 m (57.4 ft)
- Decks: 5, including 3 vehicle decks
- Propulsion: 2× 8-cyl Stork Wartsila FHD240 diesel engines driving Voith Schneider propeller
- Speed: 14 kn (25.9 km/h)
- Capacity: 895 passengers, 220 cars

MV Red Osprey is a Raptor Class vehicle and passenger ferry operated by Red Funnel on their route from Southampton to East Cowes on the Isle of Wight. She was built by Ferguson Shipbuilders in Port Glasgow.

== History ==
She first entered service in 1994, being bought new by Red Funnel along with her sister ship Red Falcon and as such, has operated the same regular route throughout her life. Between October and December 2003 she was re-fitted and extended by Remontowa in Gdańsk, Poland, in order to increase vehicle capacity by 80 and allow a greater passenger capacity. This involved the lengthening of the ship by 9.6 m (31 ft). She was the first of Red Funnel's Raptor Class ships to undergo the process,. From December 2004 until Red Eagle's stretch was completed a year later, she was the largest vessel regularly crossing the Solent, having taken this title from Wightlink's St Clare.

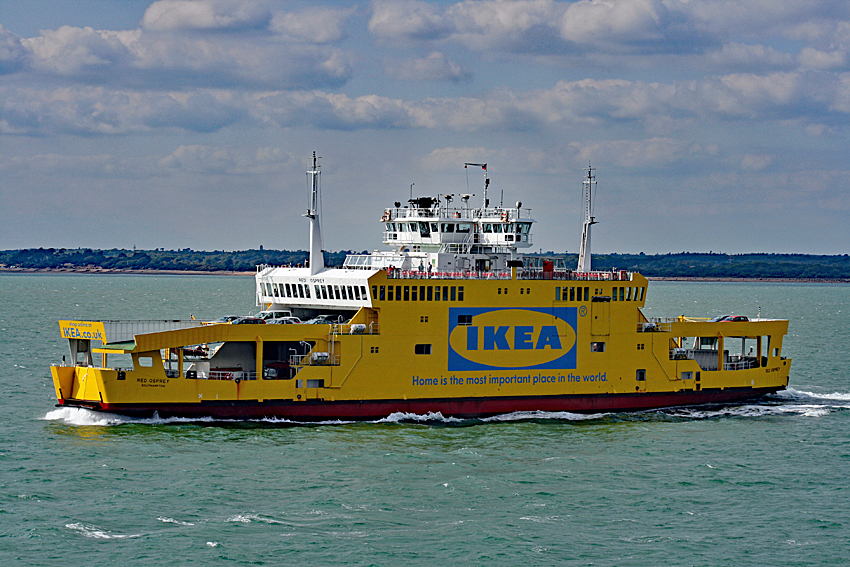
Red Osprey in IKEA livery on Southampton Water

In January 2009, the ship was re-painted in an entirely yellow and blue overall livery to advertise the opening of a new IKEA store in Southampton. This was the first time a Red Funnel ferry was re-painted out of the company's own colour scheme. She stayed in these colours for 12 months as part of a deal between Red Funnel and IKEA to provide home delivery services to the Isle of Wight. In January 2010, she was re-painted back into the normal Red Funnel colour scheme when the deal came to an end.

In 2015 Red Osprey underwent a similar refurbishment to that of her sister ship, Red Falcon, but with improvements based on customer recommendations. The refit commenced in January 2015, and she returned to service in April 2015.

== Appearances in the media ==
In 2005, Red Osprey featured in the film Fragile, starring Calista Flockhart. Several scenes were shot both on and off the ferry as it cruised across the Solent, including scenes shot on B and A deck. Somewhat unrealistically, the ferry appears to dock at the head of Ryde Pier, rather than its normal stopping point at East Cowes.
