= PS Whippingham =

Clyde-built paddle steamer (1930–1963)

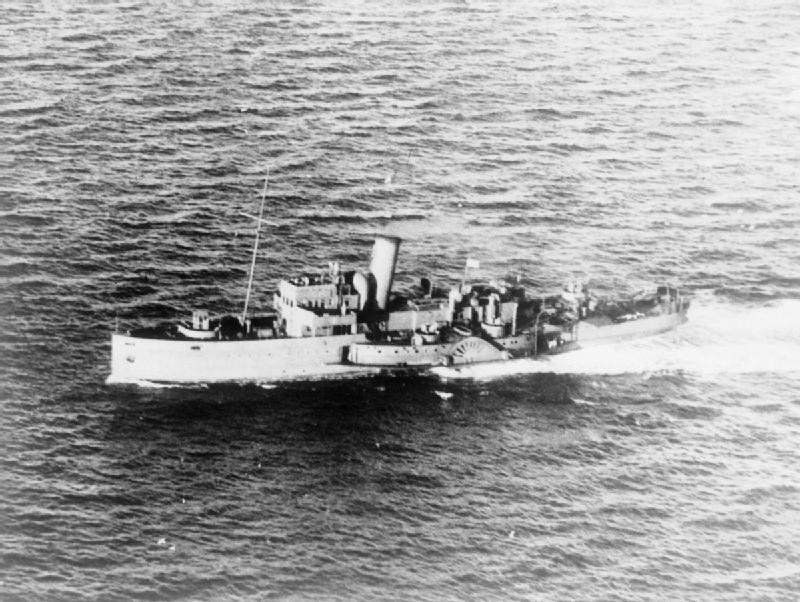
- Aerial photograph of Whippingham while in Royal Navy service.

History
- Name: PS Whippingham
- Operator: 1930–1948: Southern Railway; 1948–1963: British Railways
- Port of registry: (United Kingdom)
- Builder: Fairfield, Govan
- Yard number: 642
- Launched: 1 May 1930
- Out of service: August 1963
- Fate: Scrapped 1963

General characteristics
- Tonnage: 825 gross register tons (GRT)
- Length: 244 feet (74 m)
- Beam: 30.1 feet (9.2 m)
- Draught: 10.5 feet (3.2 m)

PS Whippingham was a passenger paddle steamer built for the Southern Railway in 1930 for the ferry route to the Isle of Wight. After distinguished war service, she returned to ferry work until she was scrapped in 1963.

== History ==
The ship was built by Fairfield, Govan and launched on 1 May 1930. She was one of two ships placed by the railway company, the other being Southsea. She was deployed on the Portsmouth to Ryde ferry service, but as one of the largest vessels commissioned for the company, also operated excursions from Portsmouth.

In 1933 there was a near collision with the King's racing yacht Britannia when the Whippingham, with a number of passengers on board, was caught by the tide and drifted towards the yacht, which was anchored some distance away. The Whippingham dropped anchor, and was stopped within 50 yards of the Royal yacht.

Although retained on the Isle of Wight ferry route at the outbreak of the Second World War, at the end of May 1940 she was requisitioned by the Admiralty and took part in the Dunkirk evacuation; although she only made one trip she brought back 2,700 men. After resuming ferry services, she was requisitioned again in 1941 as a minesweeper and converted to an anti-aircraft ship in the following year. She provided cover for convoys assembling in Largs Bay on the Firth of Clyde and later supported the Normandy landings in 1944. She returned to railway use in 1946. On 31 July 1947 she collided with the 28-ton yawl Ariette, which was preparing to take part in the Royal Thames Yacht Club regatta off the pier head at Ryde. The yacht was lifted out of the sea and the crew was thrown about the deck, but no one was seriously injured, although damage to the yacht was estimated at £3,000.

She was acquired by British Railways in 1948.

In November 1954 there was a fire on board whilst maintenance work was being carried out, but the damage was minimal.

She was scrapped in 1963.

A promotional scale model commissioned by the Southern Railway and contained in a glass cabinet still exists and is now part of the Bluebell Railway's museum collection and is currently on display at the Bluebell Railway Museum at the Sheffield Park Station.
