= PS Merstone =

History
- Name: 1924–1941: PS Merstone
- Operator: 1924–1941: Southern Railway
- Port of registry: (United Kingdom)
- Builder: Caledon Shipbuilding & Engineering Company, Dundee
- Yard number: 319
- Launched: 26 January 1928
- Out of service: 1952
- Fate: Scrapped 1952

General characteristics
- Tonnage: 342 gross register tons (GRT)
- Length: 190 feet (58 m)
- Beam: 25.1 feet (7.7 m)
- Draught: 8.7 feet (2.7 m)
- Speed: 13.5 knots
- Capacity: 750 passengers

PS Merstone was a passenger vessel built for the Southern Railway in 1928.

== History ==
The ship was built by Caledon Shipbuilding of Dundee and launched on 26 January 1928 by Mrs Donald A Mathieson, wife of the former general manager of the Scottish section of the L.M.S. Railway Company. She was one of an order for two new ships, the other being Portsdown.

She was withdrawn from service at Christmas 1950 and sold in September 1952 for breaking in Northam.
