= Hythe Scene =

Ferry used on the Hythe ferry service in Southampton, England

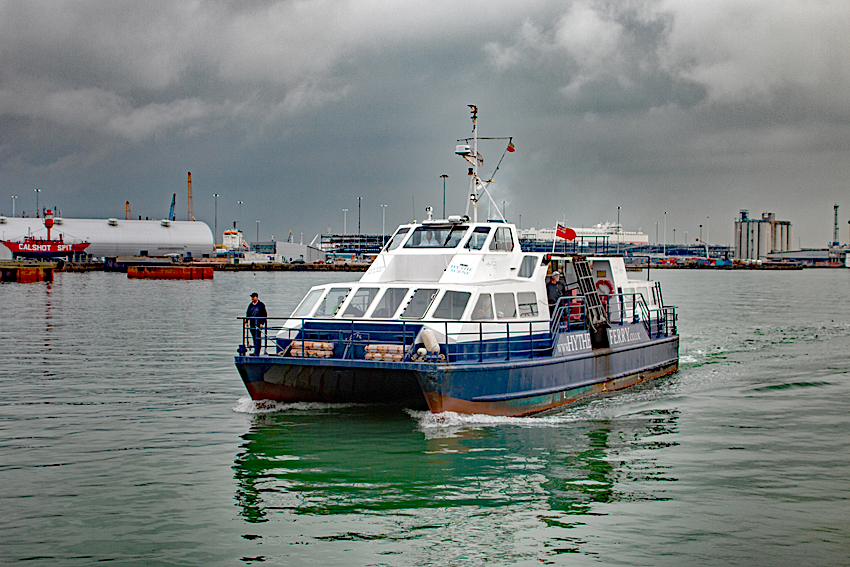
- Hythe Scene in 2017

History
- Name: 1992–2017: Great Expectations; 2017–present: Hythe Scene
- Owner: 1992–2017: White Horse Ferries; 2017–2023: Blue Funnel Group; 2023–present: Red Funnel
- Operator: 1992–2017: White Horse Ferries; 2017–2023: Blue Funnel Ferries; 2023–present: Hythe Ferry (via Red Funnel)
- Port of registry: 2017–present: Southampton, United Kingdom
- Route: Hythe Pier↔Southampton
- Launched: 1992
- Identification: MMSI number: 235083239; Call Sign: MQBW5
- Status: In service

General characteristics
- Type: Ferry
- Length: 21 metres (68 ft 11 in)
- Beam: 4 metres (13 ft 1 in)

Hythe Scene (formerly Great Expectations) is a catamaran ferry operating on the Hythe ferry service. This service connects the town of Hythe and the city of Southampton, across Southampton Water in England.

Great Expectations was originally introduced in 1992 and was used on the Gravesend to Tilbury ferry service across the River Thames between Kent and Essex, which was at that time operated by White Horse Ferries. She was named after the Charles Dickens novel, Great Expectations, in which the countryside of Kent and the marshes on the lower regions of the Thames feature heavily.

In 1995, White Horse moved Great Expectations from the Thames to be the front-line vessel on their Hythe service.

In 2008, White Horse Ferries spent £50,000 on upgrading the then 16-year-old Great Expectations, including improvements to her main drive shafts.

In 2012, Great Expectations received a new green and white with a black hull livery.

On 21 April 2017, Great Expectations was purchased by the Blue Funnel Group as part of a takeover of Hythe ferry service. Following a refit and repainting in blue, she returned to service on 26 May 2017 under the new name, Hythe Scene.

In March 2023 the ferry was used in a training exercise conducted by the home office and the Nigerian National Drug Law Enforcement Agency.
