= Gravesend–Tilbury Ferry =

Passenger ferry service in England

Coordinates: 51°26′55″N 0°22′3″E

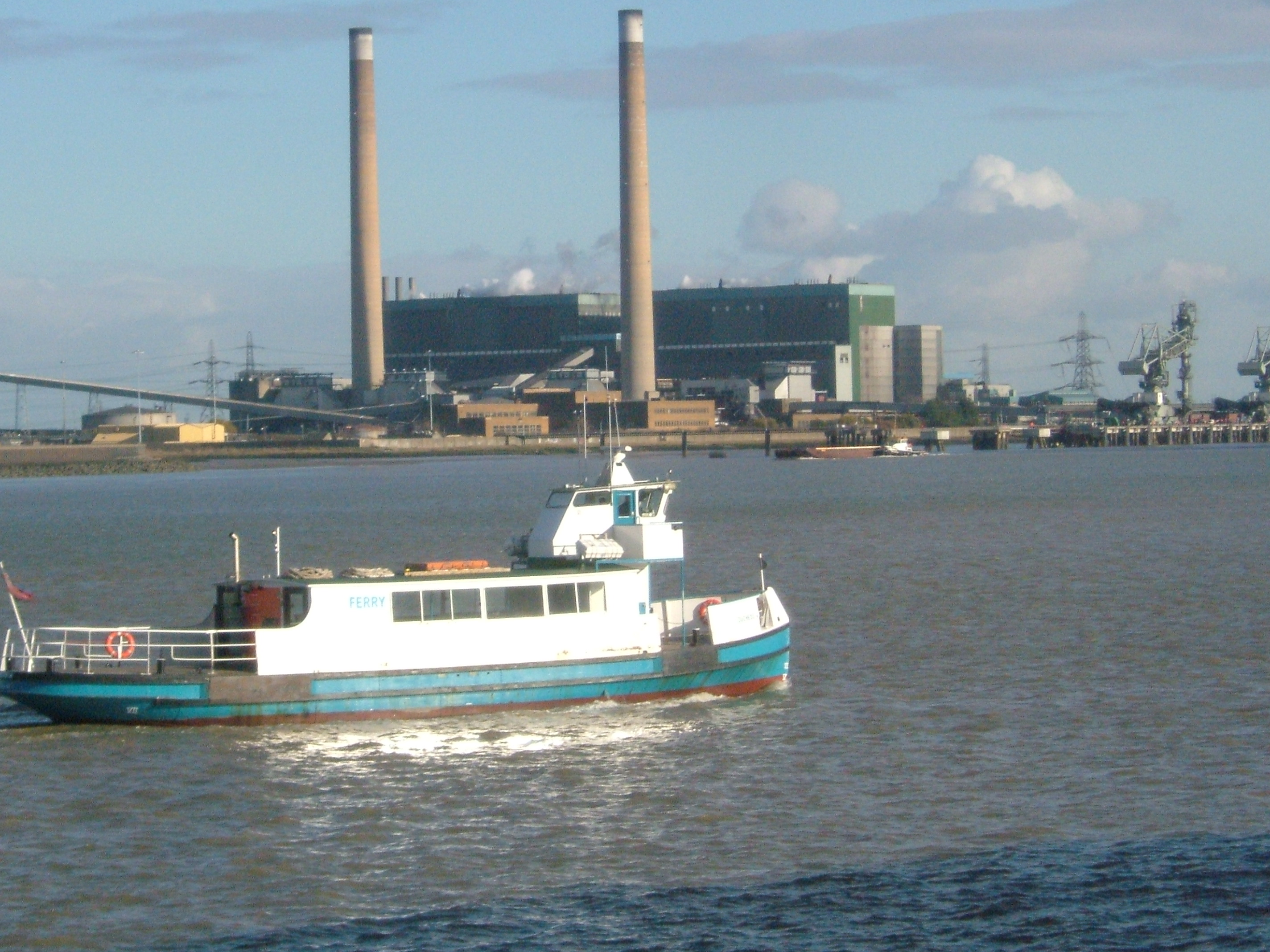
Ferry against Tilbury Power Station

The Gravesend–Tilbury Ferry was a passenger ferry across the River Thames east of London. It was the last public crossing point before the Thames reached the sea. On 1 April 2024, the service was stopped.

== History ==
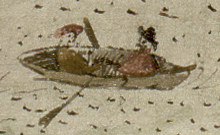
The Tilbury Ferry in 1640

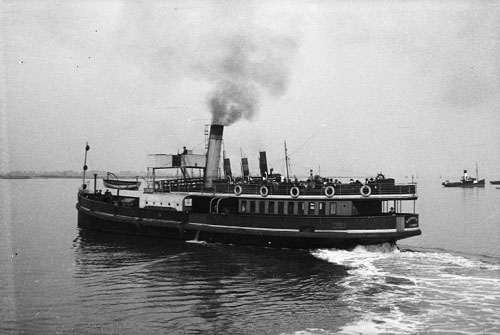
Ferry SS Gertrude, launched in 1905, pictured in 1924 or 1925

There were many ferries crossing the Thames in the area around Tilbury: one such operated between Higham and East Tilbury. This was owned by the Manor of South Hall in East Tilbury which itself was owned by Rochester Bridge.

The principal ferry operated between West Tilbury and Gravesend and was under the ownership of the Lord of the manor of Parrock in Milton-next-Gravesend. A sketch-map of 1571 shows evidence of two jetties, the one on the north bank leading to a northward road crossing the marsh. There are also houses marked on the marsh itself, which was important for sheep grazing; and there is some evidence to suggest that the ferry was used for the cross-river transport of animals and wool.

Although the 17th-century drawing might suggest a boat too small for large consignments, the long-established Gravesend market encouraged such traffic, and a contemporary account suggests that one of the boats used was a hoy, a forerunner of the Thames sailing barge. The rights to the Gravesend–Tilbury ferry were purchased by Gravesend Town Council in 1694.

At the same time, the governor of Tilbury Fort obtained the right to a ferry in the opposite direction. This originally operated from within the fort, but was later moved to a ferry house (now the World's End public house) just to the west of the fort. Sailing and rowing boats operated between Gravesend and Tilbury until they were replaced by a steam ferry service in 1855.

In 1852, the London, Tilbury and Southend Railway (LTS) was authorised to operate a ferry but only for its passengers. In 1862, the northbound Gravesend Town Council ferry was purchased by the LTS, and the southbound Board of Ordinance ferry was leased. The railway company and its successors continued to operate the ferry until 1984.

Car ferries were introduced in 1927. The duty of the ferry to transport goods and vehicles was discontinued in 1964 by authority of the British Transport Commission Act 1960 (8 & 9 Eliz. 2. c. xlvii), following the opening in 1963 of the first Dartford Tunnel. In 1991 the service was taken over by White Horse Ferries and was operated by the MV Great Expectations, purpose-built in their own yard until 1995 when it was transferred to their Southampton Water service.

== Services ==
From 17 September 2012, ferries from Gravesend used the Town Pier instead of the West Street terminal.

The ferry was operated by Jetstream Tours until 30 March 2024, and ran every 30 minutes between about 6 am and 7 pm from Monday to Saturday. The ferry operation was subsidised by both Thurrock Council and Kent County Council. Cycles were carried at no extra charge.

== Vessels employed from 1855 ==
Ship	Launched	Tonnage (GRT)	Notes
Earl of Essex	1855 ?	180 ?	Not railway owned.
Earl of Leicester	1855 ?	180 ?	Not railway owned.

=== London, Tilbury and Southend Railway ===
Owned by London, Tilbury and Southend Railway (LTS):

Ship	Launched	Tonnage (GRT)	Notes
Cato	1848	128	Built as a tug for Mersey service and purchased by LTS in 1873. Probably used in the ferry service, perhaps as a backup. Replaced by new Tilbury in 1883.
Tilbury	1855	180	Built by Henderson and Sons of Renfrew, a sister of Earl of Essex and Earl of Leicester. Renamed Sir Walter Raleigh in 1882 and re-boilered in 1892. Scrapped in 1905.
Thames	1868	125	Built by Bowdler, Chaffer and Company, Seacombe for service on Mersey jointly owned by London and North Western Railway and Great Western Railway. Was surplus to requirement and sold to LTS in 1882. Re-boilered in 1894 and scrapped in 1913 at Grays, Essex.
Tilbury	1883	269	Built by J. and K. Smit, at Kinderdijk. Re-boilered in 1897 and scrapped in 1922.
Carlotta	1893	261	Built by A.W. Robertson and Company at Canning Town. The first of four sisters. Sold for scrapping in 1930, but resold to Essex Yacht Club as a floating clubhouse at Leigh-on-Sea. Sunk by aircraft bombs off Tower Pier, London in 1941 while on naval service as a depot ship.
Rose	1901	259	Sister of "Carlotta" also built by A.W.Robertson and Company at Canning Town. Retired in February 1961 and was renamed Rose II before being towed to Belgium for breaking up.
Catherine	1903	259	Further sister of Carlotta built at Canning Town. Retired in 1960 and renamed Catherine II before being towed to Belgium for breaking-up.
Gertrude	1905	255	Further sister of Carlotta built at Canning Town. Sold in 1932 to New Medway Steam Packet Company and renamed Rochester Queen. Was sold to M.H. Bland in Gibraltar and renamed Caid. Further renaming in 1949 to Djebel Derif and dismantled in 1962.
Edith	1911	283	Built by A.W. Robertson and Co., and served until 1961 when she was renamed Edith II before being towed to Belgium for breaking-up.

All vessels in service in 1912 were transferred to the Midland Railway Company, and then became part of the London, Midland and Scottish Railway's fleet after 1923.

=== London, Midland and Scottish Railway car ferries ===
Car ferries introduced to service by London, Midland and Scottish Railway (LMS):

Ship	Launched	Tonnage (GRT)	Notes
Tessa	1924	371	Built by Lytham Shipbuilding and Engineering Co., at Lytham. Launched new vehicular ferry service in October 1924, which operated until 31 December 1964 when competition from the new Dartford Tunnel had severely reduced carryings. The vessel was broken up in 1965.
Mimie	1927	464	A slightly larger version of Tessa built by Ferguson Bros. of Port Glasgow. Served until 1964 with Tessa when service ceased and was broken up in the following year.

In 1948 control of the service was transferred to the British Transport Commission (BTC) London Midland Region and all operational vessels were taken under their control. In 1959 that control was changed to the Eastern Region of British Railways.

=== Eastern Region of British Railways ===
Vessels brought into service by the Eastern Region:

Ship	Launched	Tonnage (GRT)	Notes
Catherine	1961	214	Built by White's Shipyard (Southampton) Ltd with a Voith Schneider cycloidal screw controlled from the bridge. The first of three sister vessels. In 1976 this statutory service was no longer viable and the High Court refused permission to close it, but the following year a compromise was reached when permission was granted to replace the vessel with a smaller one. The vessel's passenger certificate was suspended in 1984 and she was withdrawn from service. She was sold in 1990 to Open Leisure Ltd and converted in North Shields to a sternwheeler and renamed Catherine Wheel for River Tyne excursion work.
Rose	1961	214	A sister to Catherine by the same builder. Sold in 1967 to Caledonian Steam Packet Company, and renamed Keppel for service on their Largs-Millport route. Ownership transferred to Scottish Transport Group in 1969. Continued in service on the Largs-Millport route until it closed in 1986, after which the vessel served as an excursion vessel. Withdrawn from service in 1992 and sold locally and renamed Clyde Rose. Still active in 2019 as an excursion boat in Malta with new wheelhouse under the name "Keppel".
Edith	1961	214	Sister to Catherine and Rose by the same builder. Did relief work on the Humber when local vessels were being overhauled and in 1984 whilst based at Grimsby was sold to the Whitehorse Group to be used as a floating restaurant and bar.

=== Vessels since 1995 ===
On service from	Ship	Company	Launched	Tonnage (GRT)	Notes
1995–1996	Great Expectations	Whitehorse Ferries	1992		
1996–2002	Martin Chuzzlewit	Whitehorse Ferries	1995	16	An 18 m Trimaran, built specifically for the ferry service. the design incorporated a special V-shaped berthing system which enabled the ferry to dock quickly and allow step-free access.
2002–2017	Duchess M	Lower Thames and Medway Passenger boat	1959	60	
2017–2024	Thames Swift	Jetstream Tours	1995	16	Built as Martin Chuzzlewit for Whitehorse ferries. The vessel spent some time in London as a tender vessel to cruise ship before being laid up in Tilbury Docks. She was sold to Jetstream Tours in 2017 when the ferry contract changed operators.
2017–2024	Jacob Marley	Jetstream Tours	1985	42	Built as Condor Kestrel in 1985 by Marine and General Engineers Ltd, Guernsey for Condor ferries. She traded between Sark and the hydrofoil service. Also served in Torbay and Jersey for a short time before moving to the Thames and Medway for Jetstream Tours. She serves as a relief ferry from time to time.

== See also ==
- Crossings of the River Thames
