= Blue Funnel =

Blue Funnel May refer to:

- Blue Funnel Line, A UK Shipping company operating from 1866 to 1988
- Blue Funnel Group, A UK pleasure and ferry boat company including Blue Funnel Cruises and Blue Funnel Ferries
