= Lower Thames and Medway Passenger Boat Company =

Cruise operator on the River Thames

- London River Services
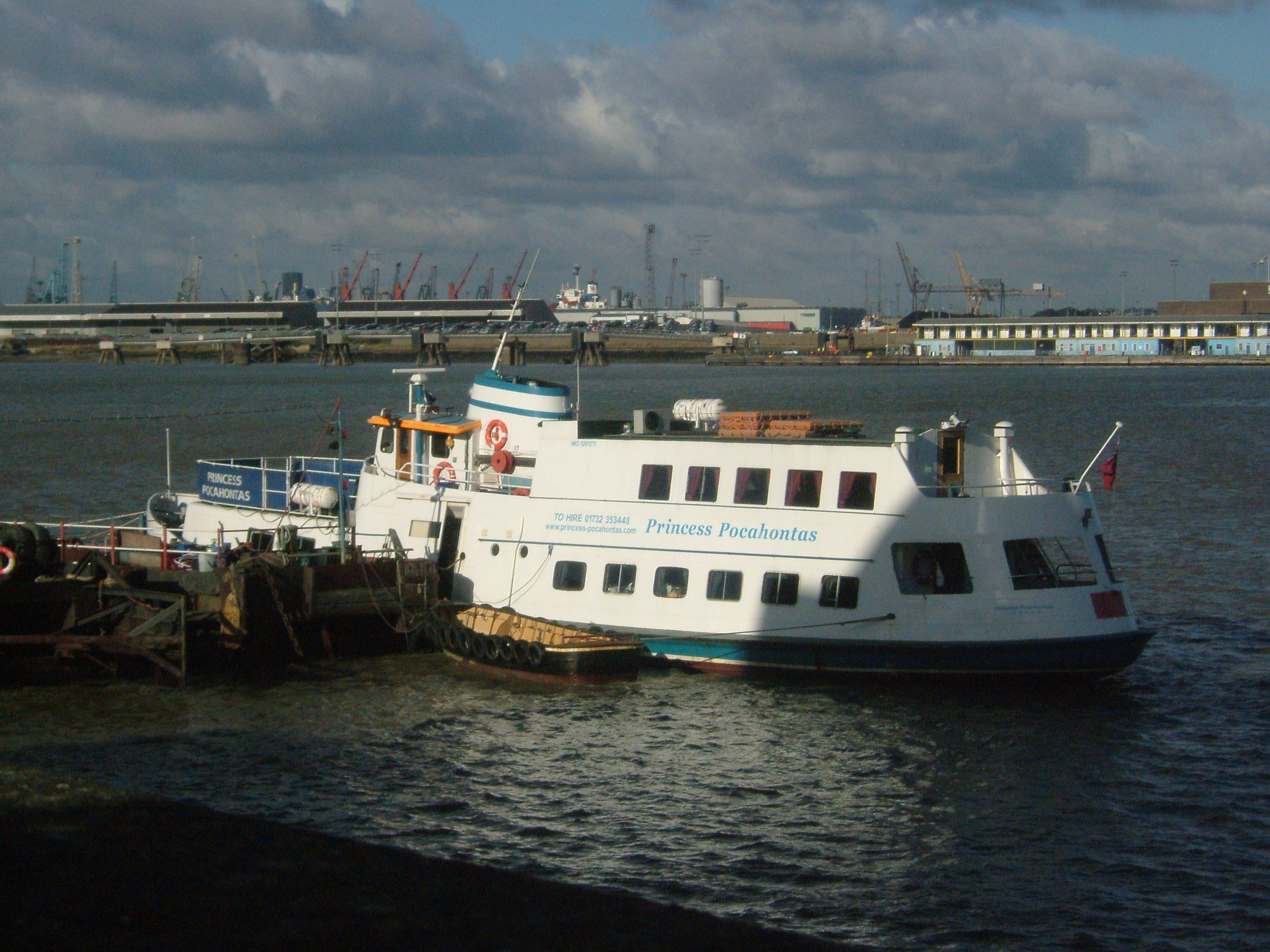
- Princess Pocahontas at Gravesend Pier
- Locale: London, UK
- Waterway: River Thames
- Transit type: Leisure/tourist cruises
- Terminals: Gravesend Pier, Tilbury Pier
- Operator: Lower Thames and Medway Passenger Boat Company
- No. of lines: 1
- No. of vessels: 1
- No. of terminals: 2

Lower Thames and Medway Passenger Boat Company was a river boat company which provided cruises on the River Thames in Gravesend and London, UK. Bateaux London cruises operate on the Thames under licence from London River Services, part of Transport for London.

== Services ==
The company provided cruises on the River Thames. Princess Pocahontas cruises begin at Gravesend and head west past Tilbury Docks, under the Queen Elizabeth II Bridge at Dartford and through the Thames Barrier, calling at Greenwich Pier. Passengers may remain on board for an optional "stay-aboard" cruise along the Thames, which returns to Greenwich.

From 2001 to 2017, it ran the Gravesend–Tilbury Ferry.

== Vessels ==
The company owned a 110-foot (34 m)-long, double-decker leisure boat, MV Princess Pocahontas with seating for 134 passengers. It was named after the Native American Princess Pocahontas who is buried at Gravesend. They also owned the passenger boat Duchess M which used to operate the ferry service between Gravesend and Tilbury.

== Dissolution ==
The company appointed administrators in April 2018, and was dissolved on 11 February 2023.
