= Pier railway =

Railway transport along piers

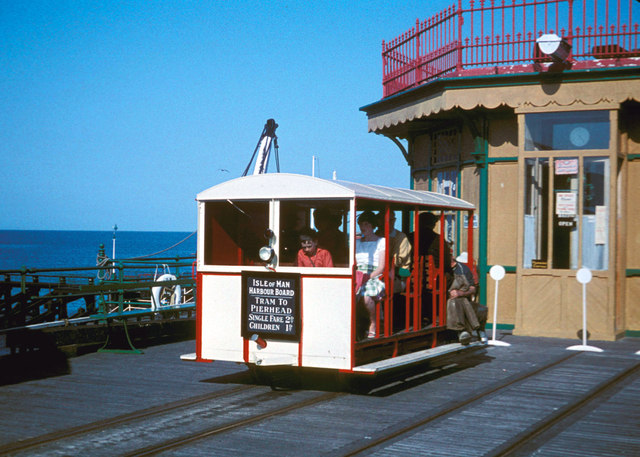
Passenger tram in 1961 on the Isle of Man

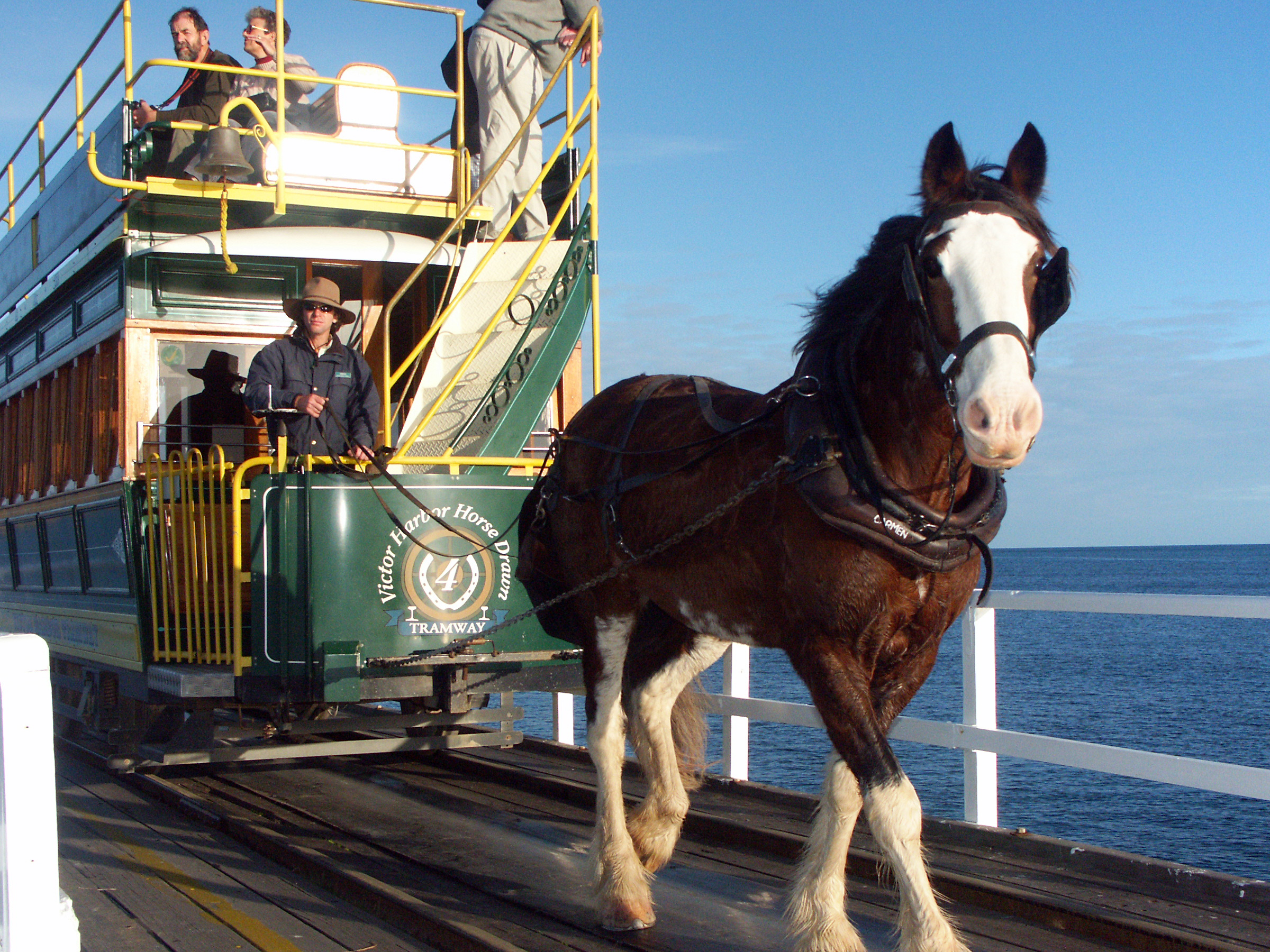
A tramcar on the causeway of Victor Harbor.

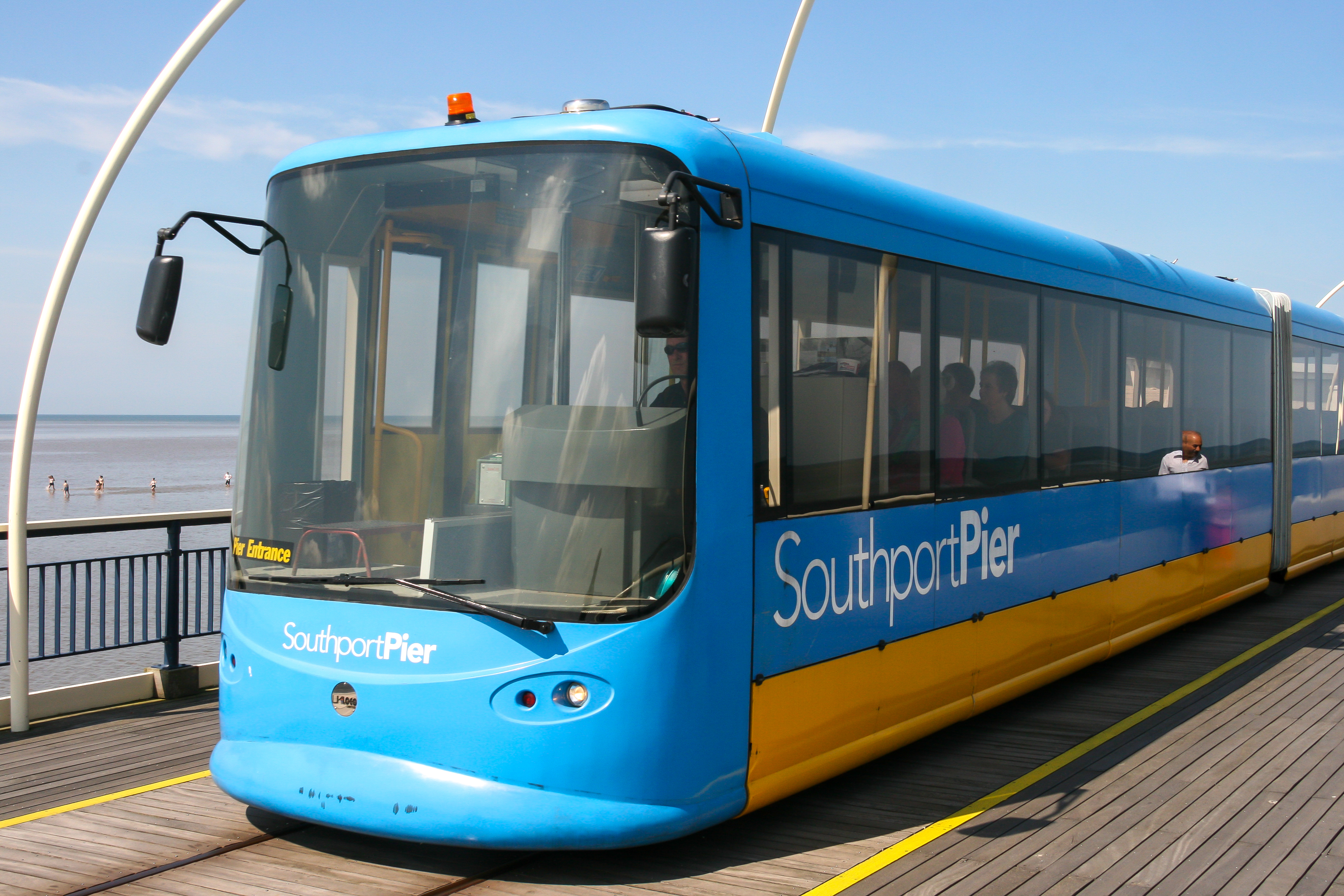
Southport Pier tram in 2011

Pier railways, sometimes called pier tramways, are a type of railway lines that provide transportation along a pier. Pier railways typically use bidirectional single-tracks. Five pier railways remain worldwide; four in the United Kingdom and one in Australia. Many others have been lost (due to fires, storms, or even coastal erosion) or decommissioned.

== Chronology ==
Historically, pier railways were used to transport goods for the construction of piers.

The oldest pier railway dates back to 1860 at the Southport Pier. The pier and the railway were extended in the 1870s.

A wooden pier opened in 1830 on the site of the 1890 built Southend Pier Railway, and a tramway began operating along it in 1846. The pier was replaced by an iron structure around 1889, and a 3 ft 6 in (1,067 mm) gauge electric tramway was laid along it.

In 1867, a 3.1 km (1.9 mi) tramway was built in Victor Harbor. Much of its route is over a 630-metre (2,070-foot) causeway. The tramway is one of the very few horse-drawn tram routes remaining in public transit service anywhere in the world. It operates every day throughout the year except Christmas Day. Up to three double-decker tramcars are each hauled by a Clydesdale horse. The line is built to 5 ft 3 in (1,600 mm) broad gauge, as were many of the early railways of South Australia.

The builders installed a 3 ft (914 mm) tramway on the Queen's Pier, Ramsey in 1882 to help transport building materials to the end of the pier. The tramway was intended to be dismantled once the pier was completed. The railway was first pushed by hand, and by 1900s, passenger railcars were added; by 1930s, locomotives ran on the railway.

By 2015, the Southport Pier railway ceased running as a safety measure, due to cracks being discovered in the pier columns. It was replaced by an extension of a pre-existing smaller land train, with the tram removed for sale in March 2016. The rails were removed in 2023 and donated to the West Lancashire Light Railway.

== Operation ==
Pier railways historically used a combination of horse-drawn railcars and steam engines, whilst some railcars were pushed by hand. Contemporary pier railways are electrified , but 3 run on narrow-gauge rails and two run on broad-gauge rails. Victor Harbor tram in Australia (the only of its type surviving today) is still horse-drawn.

Ryde Pier railway on the Island Line is part of the National Rail network, and it uses a 4 ft 8 1/2 in (1,435 mm) standard gauge. Two full stations are present on this pier; Ryde Esplanade and Ryde Pier Head. From 2021 onwards, Ryde Pier Head (and the rest of the Island Line) is served by new Vivarail D-Train Class 484 EMUs, converted from London Underground D78 Stock.

== List of pier railway systems ==
Four operational pier railway systems are located in the United Kingdom (including one in Ramsey on the Isle of Man). One active pier railway is located in Australia on a broad gauge railway.

Operational railways

- Queen's Pier, Ramsey (1886–1990, 2025–present)
- Hythe Pier, Railway and Ferry (1922–present)
- Southend Pier Railway (1890–present)
- Victor Harbor Horse Drawn Tram (1867–present)
- Ryde Pier Railway

=== Examples of defunct pier railways ===
- Southport Pier Tramway (1860–2023)
- Swanage Pier Tramway (c.1858–1930s)
- Hunstanton Pier Tramway (c.1947-1950s)
