= TSS Gertrude =

1905 British passenger vessel

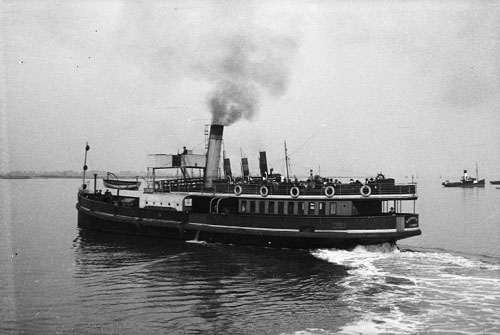
- Gertrude in 1906

History
- Name: 1905–1932: Gertrude; 1932–1934: Rochester Queen; 1934–1949: Caid; 1949–1962: Djebel Derif
- Operator: 1905–1912: London, Tilbury and Southend Railway; 1912–1922: Midland Railway; 1922–1932: London, Midland and Scottish Railway; 1932–1934: New Medway Steam Packet Company; 1934–1960: M. H. Bland, Gibraltar
- Port of registry: (United Kingdom)
- Builder: A. W. Robertson and Company
- Launched: 19 October 1905
- Out of service: 1962
- Fate: Scrapped

General characteristics
- Tonnage: 255 gross register tons (GRT)
- Length: 125 feet (38 m)
- Beam: 26.6 feet (8.1 m)
- Draught: 8.4 feet (2.6 m)

TSS Gertrude was a passenger vessel launched for the London, Tilbury and Southend Railway in 1905.

== History ==
Gertrude was built by A. W. Robertson and Company for the London, Tilbury and Southend Railway as a Gravesend-Tilbury Ferry. She was launched in 1905.

She was acquired by the Midland Railway in 1912 and the London, Midland and Scottish Railway in 1923. She was sold in 1932 to the New Medway Steam Packet Company and renamed Rochester Queen. She was sold again to M.H. Bland in Gibraltar and renamed Caid. In 1949 she was renamed Djebel Derif and was scrapped in 1962.
