= Blue Funnel Group =

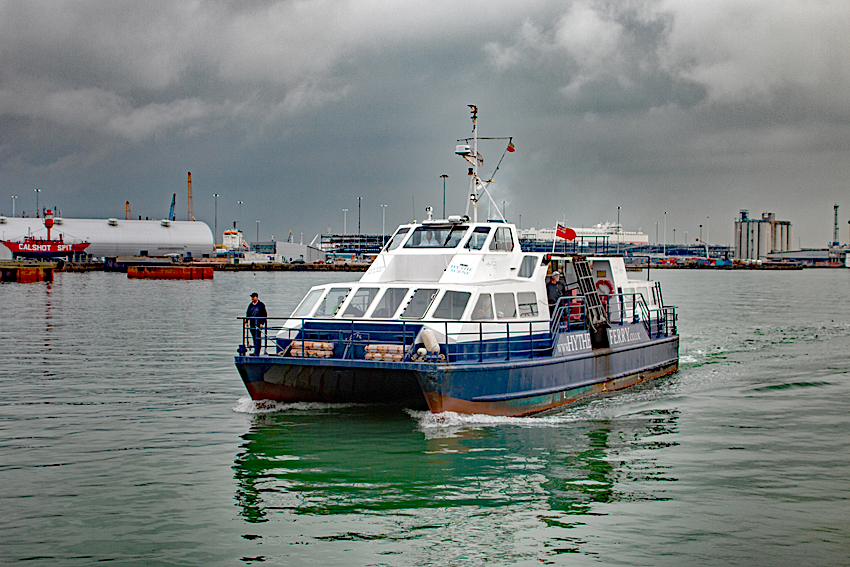
- Hythe Scene approaching Town Quay
- Industry: Transport
- Founded: 14 December 1993; 32 years ago
- Headquarters: Southampton, United Kingdom
- Area served: Solent; Isle of Wight; Hythe
- Key people: Mark Rayment (Former Managing Director)
- Owner: Lee Rayment (Managing Director)
- Website: solentcruises.co.uk bluefunnel.co.uk/

Blue Funnel Group refers to a related set of companies providing boat charter, cruise and ferry services around the Solent and Isle of Wight in vessels up to 500 passengers. The Blue Funnel Cruises operating out of Southampton Port and the Solent Cruises operating out of Portsmouth and Cowes as well as the Hythe Pier, Railway and Ferry operations are all run independently but co-operatively.

The 75-126 seat Jenny series of boats are noted for their high speed of up to 19 knots.

== History ==
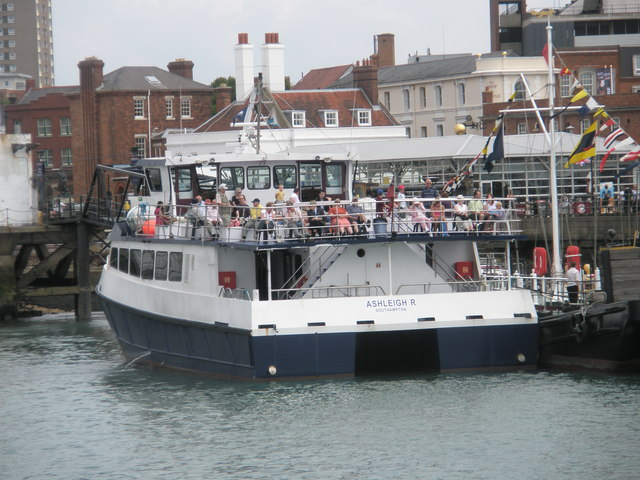
The Ashleigh R about to depart at Portsmouth Dockyard

Blue Funnel Cruises was originally formed from two or three companies including the boatbuilding Barkham family who pioneered viewing ocean liners in the 1930s. The trading name Blue Funnel was adopted about 1965. Walter Charles Hogg bought out the operation in 1979 but ran into financial difficulties in 1992 and was later bought out by the Solent and Wightline Cruises operation.

Solent and Wightline Cruises originated from the Rayment Family providing fishing trips from Bembridge on the Isle of Wight and eventually taking over Blue Funnel. The company name was later changed in 2021 to remove the "Wightline" from its name.

== Companies ==
=== Blue Funnel Cruises ===
Blue Funnel Cruises offers cruises between Southampton Port and Bucklers Hard. On 21 April 2017, the company took over the operations of the Hythe Pier, Railway and Ferry from White Horse Ferries and runs it under the Blue Funnel Ferries licence.

Logo used by Solent Cruises.

=== Solent Cruises ===
Solent Cruises offers cruises between the Isle of Wight and Portsmouth.

== Vessels ==
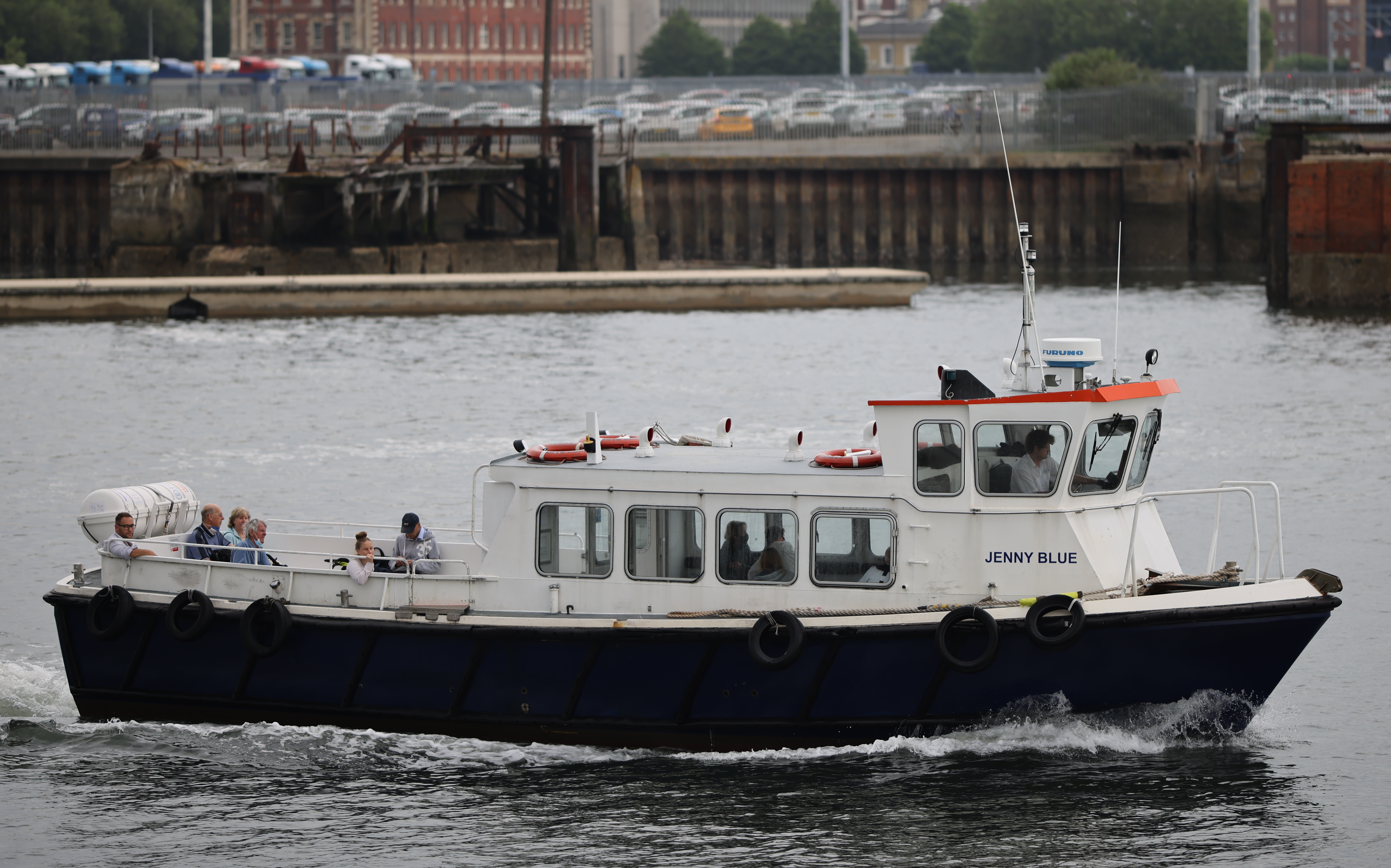
MV Jenny Blue in service as the Hythe ferry

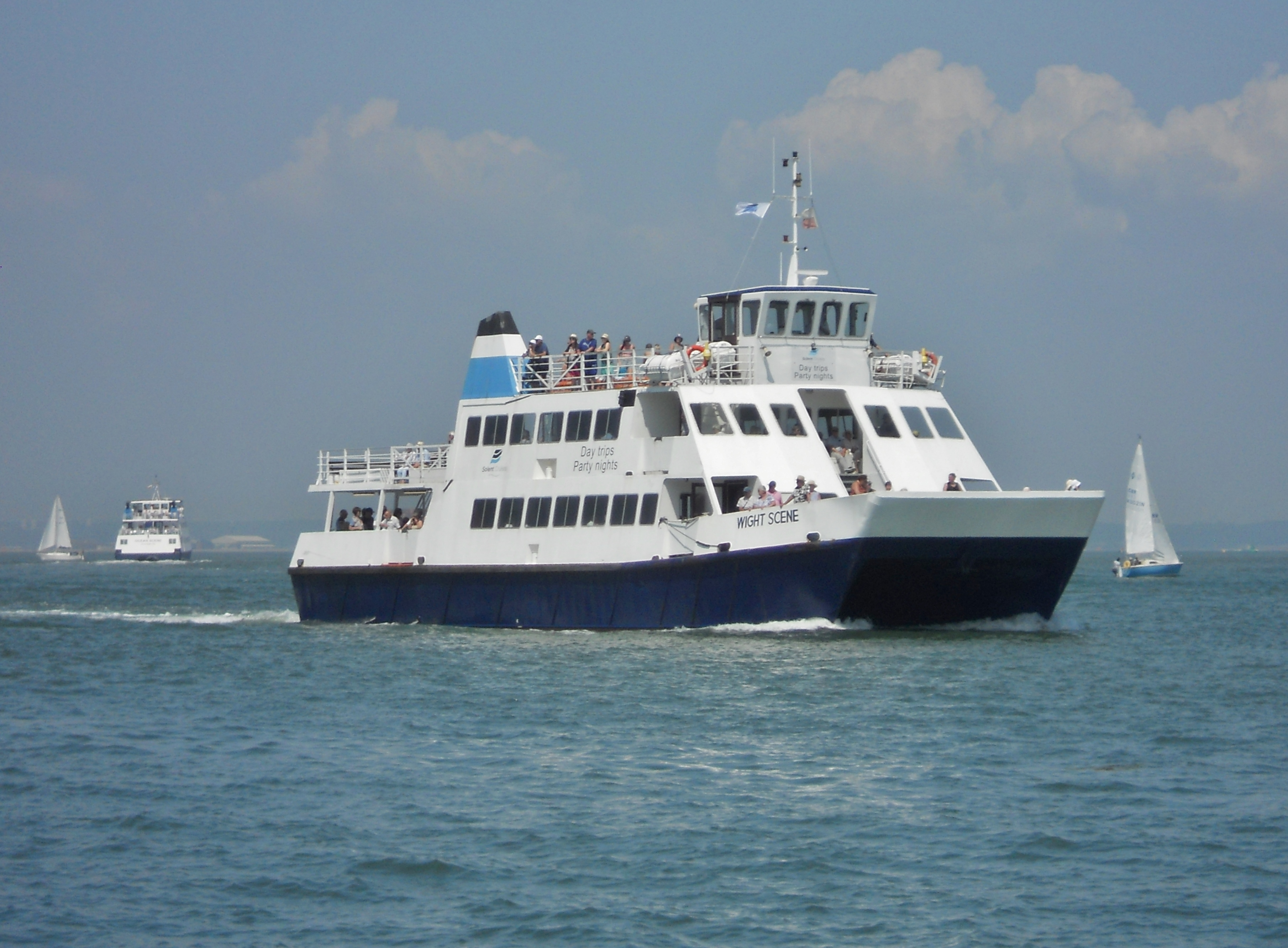
Wight Scene

Current vessels operated by the group include:

- Generally operated by Solent and Wightline Cruises:
  - Wight Scene, launched in 1992 and able to carry up to 500 passengers.
  - Solent Cat, a 245-passenger vessel including inside seating for 150.
  - Jenny M, a 116-seat vessels suited for harbour tours and school groups.
  - Jenny Lee, a 12.9 long vessel with an 18 knot top speed.
  - Jenny R, a 12.9 long vessel with an 18 knot top speed, may sometimes operate from Buckler's Hard.
  - Valerie, build in 1971 and since totally refurbished with a 17 knot top speed.
- Generally operated by Blue Funnel Cruises:
  - Ashleigh R, A twin hull introduced in 2004.
  - Oliver B, A vessel generally operating from Bucklers Hard
  - Ocean Scene, a sister ship of Wight Scene
- Generally operated by Blue Funnel Ferries:
  - Hythe Scene, formerly Great Expectations, a vessel Blue Funnel Group inherited as part of the Hythe ferry deal. Refitted during maintenance in 2017 including rebranding, adding winter heating and wooden bench seating replacement.
  - Jenny Blue, a 13m long vessel sharing Hythe ferry duties with Hythe Scene as of autumn 2018.

The vessel Solent Scene was once owned by Solent Cruises under the Blue Funnel brand, it was sold in May 1998 and is now independent of the company.
