= Southend Pier Railway =

English narrow gauge railway

Coordinates: 51°31′27″N 0°43′08″E

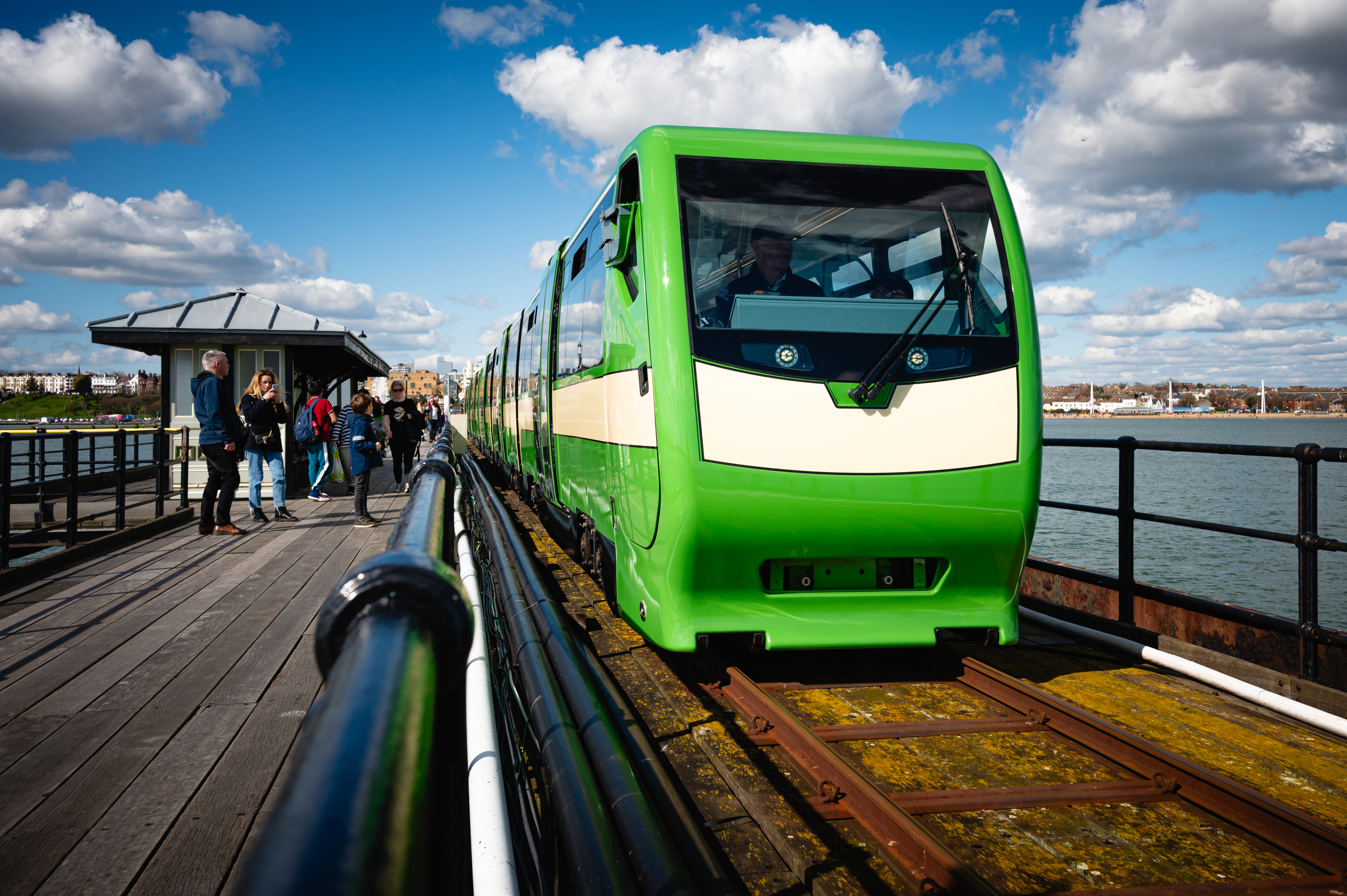
- A Severn Lamb train runs towards Pier Head Station 2023

Overview
- Status: Operational
- Owner: Southend-on-Sea City Council
- Locale: Southend-on-Sea
- Termini: Shore station; Pier Head station
- Stations: 2

Service
- Type: Light rail
- Services: 1

History
- Opened: 28 May 1890

Technical
- Track length: 2,046 yd (1,871 m)
- Num of tracks: 1
- Track gauge: 3 ft (914 mm) c.1830–c.1889, 1986–present; 3 ft 6 in (1,067 mm) 1890–1978
- Operating speed: 18 mph (29 km/h)
- Signalling: Automatic

The Southend Pier Railway is a 3 ft (914 mm) narrow gauge pier railway in the English city of Southend-on-Sea, Essex. It runs for 1.25 miles (2.0 km) along the 1.34-mile (2.16 km) length of Southend Pier, providing public passenger transport from the shore to the pier head.

A wooden pier opened in 1830, and a primitive tramway began operating along it in 1846. The pier was replaced by an iron structure around 1889, and a 3 ft 6 in (1,067 mm) gauge electric tramway was laid along it. This proved popular, and the number of trains gradually increased from one to four, while the number of carriages in each train also increased in stages from one to seven.

In 1949, four electric trains of seven carriages each were obtained from AC Cars of Thames Ditton, and the old trains were largely scrapped, although some were sold on. These trains continued to work until the 1970s, by which time only two were in service, and the railway closed in 1978, due to its poor state and the cost of repairs. Eight years later, the railway was relaid to 3 ft (914 mm) gauge, and two diesel trains were purchased to operate the service. The railway was opened by Princess Anne on 2 May 1986. In 2020, Southend Council decided to upgrade the rolling stock again, and two battery-electric trains were purchased from Severn Lamb. These were expected to begin operating in mid-2021, but teething problems resulted in them not being fully operational until late 2022.

== History ==
The original wooden pier built in 1830 employed a tramway from 1846, to convey goods and visitors to the pierhead. It used wooden rails, and luggage was carried on trucks which were pushed along it by hand. There was also a truck fitted with a sail, which could be used when the wind direction was favourable. After being owned by a series of private individuals, the pier was offered to the Southend Local Board (later Southend Borough Council) for £12,000 in December 1873, who paid £10,000 for it after negotiations were completed. Within two years they had replaced the wooden rails with iron ones, and trams were hauled by a pair of horses in tandem. The tramway closed in 1881 due to the poor state of the track, and the problems of the horses putting their hooves through holes in the planks. A suggestion by a councillor to use an elephant instead of horses was not implemented. The tramway had been profitable during its operation, as the Local Board had used the profits to reduce rates significantly.

With the construction of the new iron pier, by 1889, about 3/4 mile (1.2 km) of 3 ft 6 in (1,067 mm) gauge single track had been laid and a single toastrack motor car supplied by Falcon Works of Loughborough was run over it. An official opening took place on Friday 2 August 1890, when some of the members of the local board, accompanied by Dr Hopkinson and R. E. B. Crompton, representing Messrs Crompton and Company of Chelmsford, who had constructed the pier and railway, travelled the length of the railway in both directions. Three days later on the Bank Holiday Monday, over 3,000 visitors used the railway, with the single car running continuously from 10:15 until 19:30. A further 2,500 sampled its delights on Tuesday.

The motor car was equipped with a 13 hp (9.7 kW) motor taking current at 200 V DC from the pier's own generator. The compound-wound generator was belt driven from a Davey, Paxman & Co 25 hp (19 kW) steam engine with a locomotive-type boiler. Current collection was from a centre rail consisting of a steel channel and copper strip mounted on petticoat insulators, with a carbon brush pickup on the motor cars. The return circuit was through the running rails. In 1890, the 1 1/4 miles (2.0 km) single track was completed and two trailer cars acquired to form a three-car train. By 1893, a second train of three cars had been purchased, and a passing loop near the half-way point was added in 1898.

Over the six years from 1893, traffic on the pier had developed to the point where another two trains were needed. At the same time, in 1899, a second generator was provided and the passing loop extended. However, in 1902, Southend Corporation established its own generating station in London Road and the pier plant became redundant and was removed. The new supply was at 500 V DC; so the four motor cars were refitted with new motors rated at 18 hp (13 kW) each. The trains were made up to four cars each by the purchase of four new trailer cars from the Falcon Works. Trains were extended to five cars in 1909, when the motors were replaced by British Thomson-Houston 27 hp (20 kW) motors, and to seven in 1913/14, when a second 27 hp motor was fitted to each motor car. Each train consisted of a non-driving motor in the middle, with three trailers and three driving trailers, although the precise order in which they were marshalled is not documented. The motor cars and two of the driving trailers were enclosed, while the rest of the formation consisted of toastrack vehicles. There were also two double-ended single cars for use in the winter, which had 18 hp (13 kW) motors and seating for 30 passengers, some of it enclosed but some of it open. Two service vehicles were also used on the line, one to carry luggage and stores, and the other fitted with a water tank.

== 20th Century ==
In 1911 the conductor rail was replaced with 45lb/yard steel rail, similar to the running rails, with new pickups, made of cast iron, being fitted to the motor cars. In 1919, the original track, now twenty years old, needed replacement, so new running and conductor rails were laid throughout the pier.

In 1923, experimental magnetic brakes were fitted to one train set. The experiment was evidently not a success as they were discarded after about a year. At the same time, new wheels with Bessemer steel tyres were fitted to all the cars.

The year 1928 saw the extension of the midway loop by a further 150 yd (140 m) and new loops were constructed extending from the North (shore) and South (pier head) stations. The following year these loops were joined up to form a double track railway 93 chains, (2,046 yd (1,871 m)) long, along the length of the pier. The track came out of cover at pile 18, the two signal cabins were at piles 47/48 and 179/180, and the south station was at piles 217 to 225. At some stage, a workshop was built along the west side of the shore station to handle routine maintenance.

During the Second World War the pier was closed to visitors. It was taken over by the Royal Navy on 9 September 1939, and renamed HMS Leigh, becoming an assembly point for convoys with anti-aircraft guns on the pier head. It was also the main shipping control point for the Thames Estuary. The trains ran over 300,000 miles during the war years, and carried around 1.5 million service personnel. They carried supplies and war equipment for the ships, as well as ammunition for the anti-aircraft guns. Service personnel included many who were sick or wounded, returning from ships, and some of the carriages were adapted to carry men in stretchers. Masters of passing merchant ships used to complain the trains set off the acoustic aircraft early warning devices fitted to their vessels.

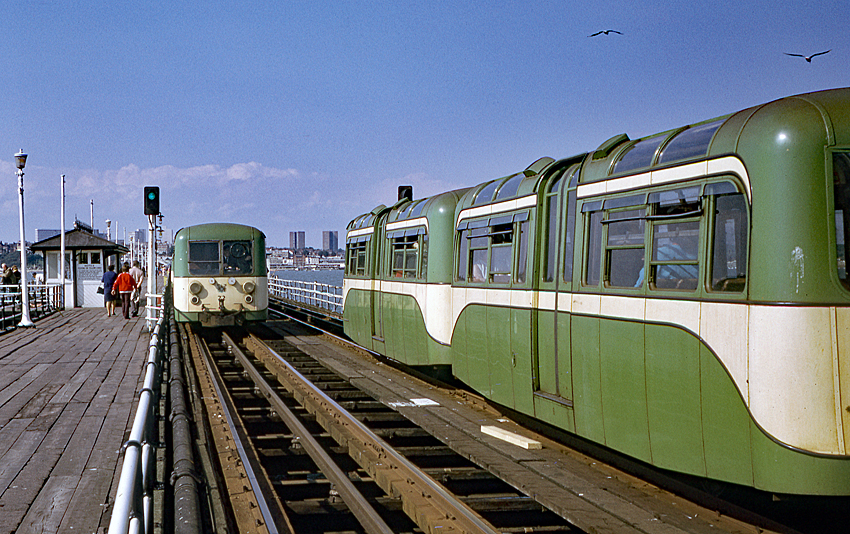
AC Cars electric trains in 1974. Note the third rail and longitudinal sleepers.

With the war ended, the pier became a popular attraction again. 2,750,000 passengers rode on the trains in 1946, and this had increased to 3,310,922 in 1947. By 1949 the original rolling stock was approaching 60 years old and so it was decided to replace it. New stock was ordered from AC Cars of Thames Ditton, the survivors of which worked the line until its closure in the mid-1970s. Twenty-eight cars were supplied, forming four trains of seven cars each, consisting of three motor cars and four trailer cars in M-T-T-M-T-T-M formation, the motors cars being operated in multiple. Each train could carry up to 260 passengers. At a top speed of 18 mph (29 km/h), the journey took four minutes each way, and during peak periods a train ran every five minutes, continuing until 11 pm. The record for passengers carried in one day stands at 55,000, and then new trains carried a record 4,713,082 passengers in 1949, the only year when numbers exceeded four million.

There were three common patterns of operation:

- Peak: all four trains in service. At any time two trains would be moving, one in each direction, while two more were sitting at the stations. As a train was on its way in to a station, the waiting train would depart, so passengers arriving at a station would normally find a train waiting, although this was not guaranteed.
- Off-peak: two trains were sitting locked up, while the other two ran a service.
- Low season: one train ran a shuttle service on one track while all the other trains were stored, at one end or the other, on the other track.

=== Decline ===
By 1964, the trains had carried around 45 million passengers, but seaside holidays then became less popular, and visitors to the pier dropped below one million in 1970. Two of the trains were withdrawn, leaving cars 1–7 and 22–28, although car 17 replaced car 26 in the second set. Car 8, one of the surplus motor cars, was converted into a works loco, consisting of a driving cab at the south end and a flat bed mounted on the remainder of the chassis. This was used for the transportation of goods out to the bars and stalls at the end of the pier, and also acted as a permanent way train. It was originally intended that this would replace car 29, which had been converted to a flat truck with cab in 1902, but both continued to operate on the railway. Motor cars 11, 14, 15 and 21 as well as trailer car 20 were moved to the Southend Corporation depot at Camper Road, while others were used as a source of spare parts. One was sold for £1, to be used as a garden shed.

In 1971. the Borough Council considered three options for the future of the pier. One was to demolish it, which was ruled out by fierce opposition from residents of the town. The second was to replace the railway with an Aerobus system, with vehicles running along a cable suspended from towers built alongside the existing pier, but the cost was prohibitive. The third was to reduce the railway to a single track, and this was selected in 1974 as the preferred option. This was expected to take 18 months to complete, and to cost £1.3 million, but in March 1975, the council decided to use direct labour and to spend £3,582,000 over 15 years to upgrade the pier.

Later in 1975, they took delivery of a 6.6 ton hydraulic crane, manufactured by Atlas/PAPE, which was floated down the River Thames from Tilbury on a barge. It was rail mounted, but the wheels could be retracted to allow the chassis to rest on the rails, evenly distributing its weight over its 16-foot (4.9 m) length. In February 1976 a 4-wheeled Wickham trolley was obtained, and used to carry out a thorough assessment of the pier's structural steelwork. The railway effectively became single track, as the western track was used as a worksite for fitting new decking to the pedestrian walkway.

Although reconstruction of the pier was progressing well by 1978, news for the railway was less good. The track and the signalling system were thought to be life-expired, and consequently, the railway closed on 1 October 1978. The Council attempted to find developers who would manage the pier, but the requirement that the railway should be re-instated dissuaded any potential developers from proceeding. In 1982, all of the 1949 stock trains and other equipment were offered for sale as scrap. The electrical equipment was bought by the East Anglian Transport Museum, based at Carlton Colville near Lowestoft. The hydraulic crane and Wickham trolley went to the Brecon Mountain Railway, where they were regauaged to 1 ft 11 1/2 in (597 mm) and are used by the engineering department. Most of the 1949 stock ended up in a scrapyard at Shoeburyness although some went elsewhere, and some was subsequently rescued.

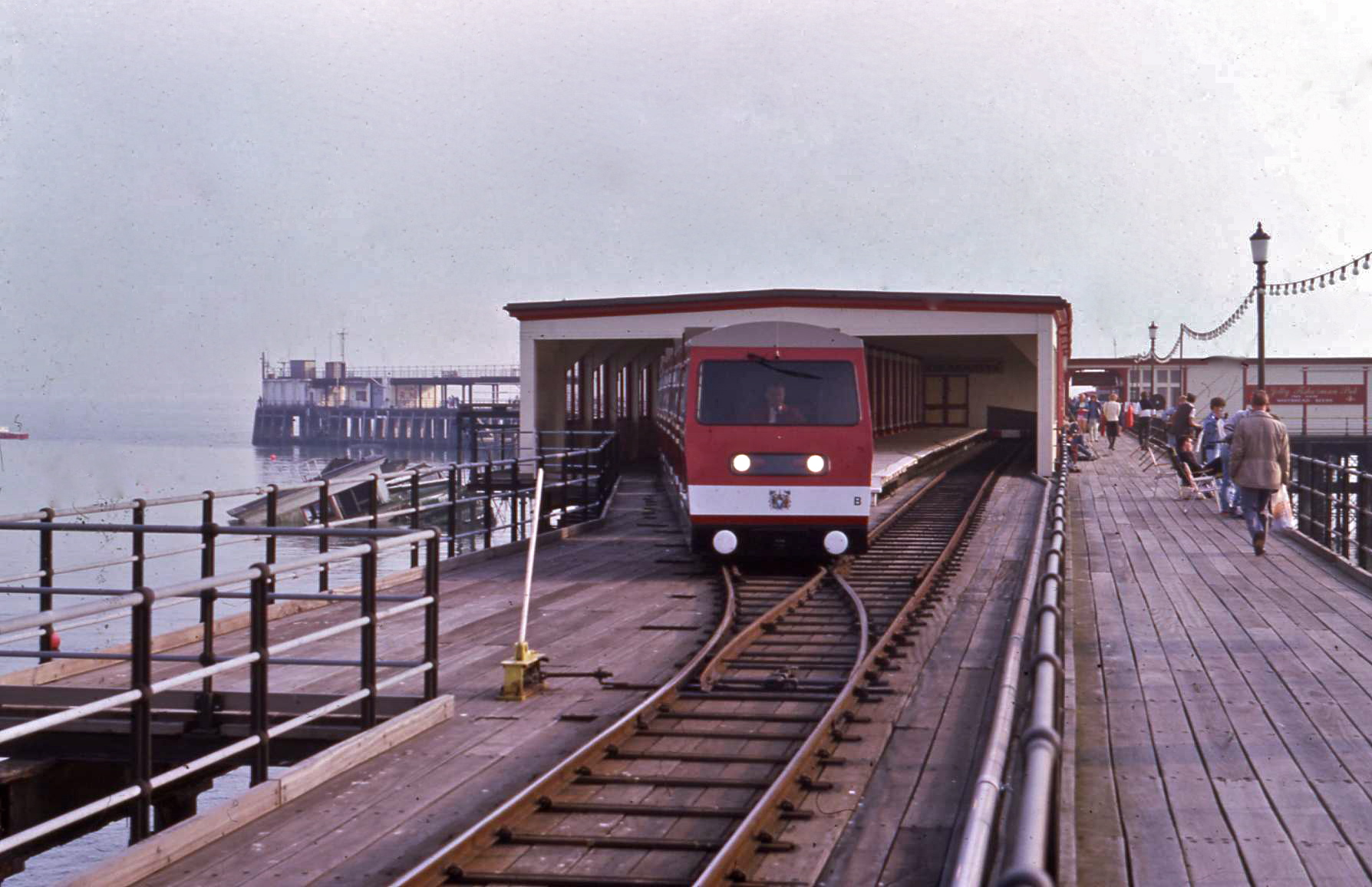
Train in burgundy and white livery in 1987 (collapsed pier section behind)

During 1985, the railway was rebuilt as a 3 ft (914 mm) gauge line. The work was undertaken by May Gurney Ltd, and during construction they used Motor Rail 10160 as the site locomotive, which they had acquired from Swinefleet Peat Works in 1984. When completed the railway was reopened by Princess Anne on 2 May 1986. Two new diesel trains were built by Severn Lamb and introduced on a simplified line comprising a single track with a passing loop and twin-track terminal stations. As originally delivered, the trains were liveried in all-over burgundy with a white waist-band, but were repainted to a two-tone blue in 2006, retaining the white waist-band. They also carried a Southend Borough Council logo.

A battery powered single passenger car, built by Castleline of Nottingham, entered service in November 1995 for service in winter. This car is numbered 1835, the year that Southend Pier first appeared on Admiralty charts. There are also several wagons for maintenance trains.

== 21st century ==
On 9 October 2005, a fire severely damaged much of the pier head including the railway station. The station was temporarily re-sited, until a new and modern structure was opened on the original site in September 2009. Although the passenger trains were not damaged, two wagons used on maintenance trains were destroyed in the fire.

In September 2016, the railway was out of action due to emergency engineering works, though the pier itself was still open to the public. The Pier Railway reopened in late 2016. Two new trains, built by Severn Lamb, were scheduled to replace the 1986 built trains in 2021. A public consultation was held in 2020, with three possible colour schemes and four designs for the nose cone. 3,466 people responded, and the modern nose cone with traditional green and cream livery were the most popular. The new trains began arriving at the pier on 28 September 2021. They are painted in the green and cream livery carried by the earlier electric trains. They were originally expected to be running in 2021, but delivery was delayed due to a problem with the paint. Commissioning testing took place after they were delivered, which was expected to be completed by February 2022.

The new trains were formally unveilled by Prince Charles and Camilla, Duchess of Cornwall on 1 March 2022, while they were visiting the town to award it city status. Prince Charles named the first train Sir David Amess, after the former MP for the town who was murdered. Further delays occurred, and the first passengers were carried by the new trains on 5 April. There were problems on 28 April, when the doors failed to open and passengers were stuck inside the carriage. Continuing teething problems resulted in the diesel train Sir William Heygate being put back into service in August, while problems with the new stock were rectified. The first electric train returned to service on 22 September 2022, and the service was maintained by continuing to run the diesel train until commissioning of the second electric train was completed.

On 6 October 2024, one of the battery electric trains was damaged when it failed to stop before hitting the buffers at the Pier Head station. The train was carrying passengers, but there were no reports of any injuries. However, a glass panel in one of the doors had to be removed to allow passengers to leave the front carriage. Southend Council stated that the train would be out of service until an investigation by the Office of Road and Rail was completed.

== Operation ==
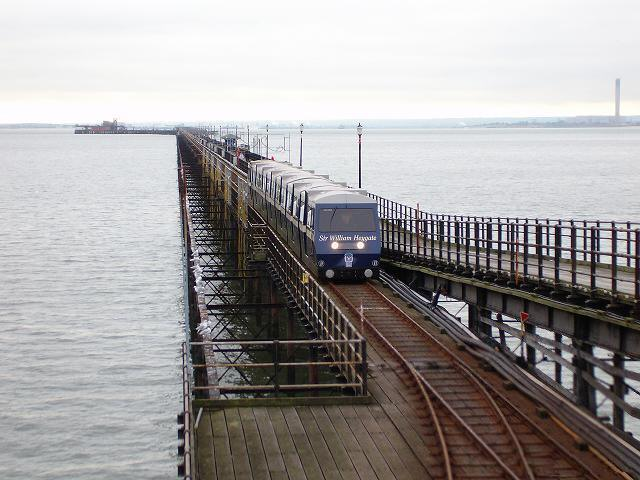
Sir William Heygate approaching the shore terminus in 2006. The pedestrian access to the pier can be seen descending from the station roof

The line is owned and operated by Southend-on-Sea City Council, and operates every day the pier is open. The normal service uses a single train, and runs every half-hour. As of 2024, the Council no longer state that at peak times a two train service is operated, providing a 15-minute interval service. Trains operate between stations known as Shore and Pier Head with no intermediate stops.

After the reopening on 2 May 1986, the Southend Pier Railway operated two diesel trains, each consisting of a diesel-hydraulic locomotive at the southern end, five trailer coaches and, at the northern end, a driver control unit with passenger space. The two trains were named Sir William Heygate and Sir John Betjeman. The Sir William Heygate remains in service as a reserve train for the time being. The Sir John Betjeman has been decommissioned, with the locomotive parked at the pier end station, while the carriage bodies were removed from their chassis and reused as waiting shelters at various places in the station and around the pier. The waiting shelters have since been scrapped.

Since 2021 the service has been provided by two battery-electric trains. Prince Charles and Camilla, Duchess of Cornwall only named the first train, as the second was not delivered until after their visit. It was named William Bradley after the pier head keeper from 1871 to 1891.

A twin-track island platform is provided at each terminus, and there is a passing loop in mid-pier, but otherwise the line is single tracked. The pier head terminus is in the open air, but the shore terminus is enclosed, and also provides rail access to a workshop for maintaining the trains. The Southend Pier Museum is situated below the shore station in the original workshops.

=== Rolling stock ===
==== Current fleet ====
Class	Image	Type	Top speed		Number	Carriages	Built
Class	Image	Type	mph	km/h	Number	Carriages	Built
Severn Lamb BEMU		Battery electric multiple unit (BEMU)	10.0	16.1	2	2 sets formed of 6 carriages each, with a 4w battery truck between cars 3 and 4	2021
Severn Lamb locomotive		Diesel hydraulic locomotive	10.0	16.1	2	2 sets formed of locomotive, 4 carriages plus 1 driving trailer	1986

==== Past fleet ====
Class	Image	Type	Top speed		Number	Carriages	Built	Preserved
Class	Image	Type	mph	km/h	Number	Carriages	Built	Preserved
AC Cars EMU		Electric multiple unit	18.0	28.9	4	4 sets with 7 cars each Formation= DM-T-T-DM-T-T-DM	1949	6 cars
Falcon Works EMU		Electric multiple unit			4	4 sets of 7 cars Formation= DT-T-DT-NDM-T-T-DT	1890, 1893, 1902, 1909, 1913/14	3 cars

=== Preservation ===
Following the closure of the railway in 1978, the old workshops, located below the shore station, were used to store a growing collection of memorabilia, including pictures and rolling stock. Car 29, the flat wagon converted from the 1890 stock, was stored there and was joined by cars 11 and 2 in 1982 when a local trader donated £1000 to allow them to be bought back from the Shoeburyness scrapyard. An organisation called the Friends of Southend Pier Museum was set up in 1985, later becoming the Southend Pier Museum Foundation. They located car 22 in another scrapyard at Chelmsford and purchased it for £500 in 1987. The pier museum opened on 8 July 1989, exactly 100 years since the opening of the iron pier. Volunteers from the Foundation worked on restoring the cars, which had been damaged while being moved to the scrapyard, and subsequently by vandalism, with car 22 being the first to be completed in 1990.

Some of the 1949 stock cars escaped the scrapyard in 1982, and were stored at Tal-y-Cafn goods yard, to become part of the proposed North Wales Tramway Museum near Colwyn Bay. Some reports say that four cars went there, including car 8, the converted flat truck, and car 7, while others say three, and the presence of cars 8, 21, and 7 are confirmed by photographs. The museum was never established, and all three were moved back to Essex, car 8 to Mangapps Railway Museum in Burnham-on-Crouch, car 21 to the Lynn Tait Gallery in old Leigh-on-Sea, and car 7 to the Central Nursery of Southend Borough Council's Parks Department for storage.

As well as documenting the history of the pier, the museum housed four railway vehicles. These were car 29, the 1902 converted flat top wagon, dating from 1890, and three of the 1949 AC Cars vehicles, driving motor cars No. 11 and No. 22 and trailer car No. 2. In the late 1980s, the bodywork of one of the 1890 toastracks was discovered in a garden in Benfleet. It had been used as a chicken coop and garden shed since 1949, and was given to the Foundation in exchange for a new garden shed. Subsequently, the driving cabin and the flat bed of car 29 were removed, and the restored bodywork was fitted to the chassis to create a complete vehicle.

In 2023, the displays in the museum were reworked, and two of the 1949 stock cars were removed, to be replaced by the driving trailer car from the 1986 diesel train Sir John Betjeman. In order to do this, part of the side wall of the museum had to be demolished, to provide access, and then rebuilt. Car 22 remains, and the other two went to the Central Nursery, part of the Parks Department, where they joined car 7, which had been there since before 2012. In 2012, car 21 was on display in the Lynn Tait Gallery, located in the Old Foundry at Leigh-on-Sea. The gallery closed in 2017, following the death of Lynn Tait but subsequently reopened as a cafe which still houses car 21.

Two of the Falcon Works trailer cars were purchased by the Volk's Electric Railway in Brighton when they became redundant in 1949. They were regauged to 2 ft 8 1/2 in (825 mm) and converted into motor cars numbered 8 and 9. They continued to operate in Brighton until the late 1990s, when they were again retired. Car 8 was returned to Southend to join the Southend Pier Museum collection, but after some years was moved to Sandford Mill for refurbishment. This work was eventually carried out by Alan Keef Ltd in 2018, and the vehicle is displayed inside a glass case at Chelmsford Museum. Car 9 remained at the Volk's Electric Railway, but in 2008 extra storage space was needed. Ownership was transferred to the Volk's Electric Railway Association, which moved it to the South Downs Heritage Centre at Hassocks, where it was expected to be part of a transport display. However, this failed to happen, and it was stored under a tarpaulin for 15 years. In 2023 it was moved back to the Volk's Electric Railway to be part of their 140th anniversary celebrations. Since then, plans have been drawn up to return it to operational service, and it is probable that the centre two bays will be adapted to take passengers in wheelchairs.

== Gallery ==
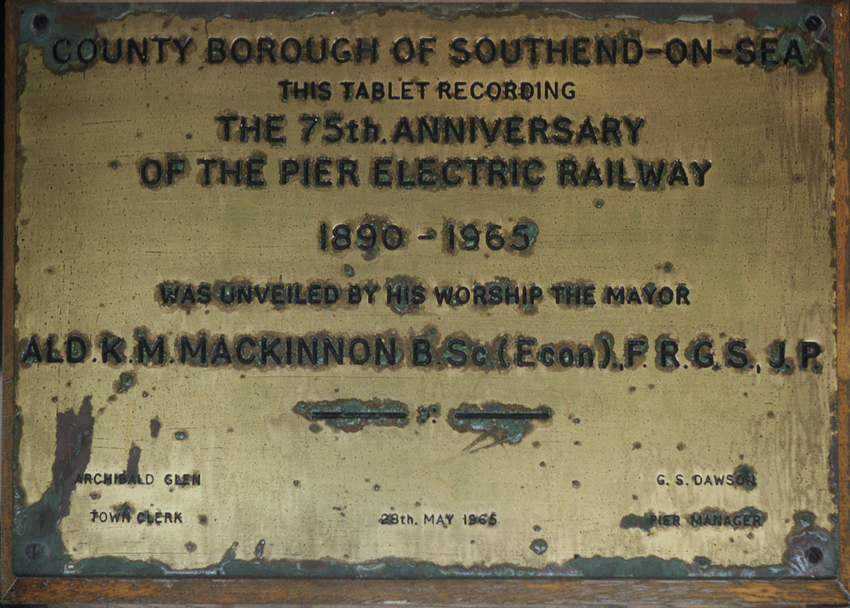
Plaque celebrating the 75th anniversary of the Southend Pier Railway

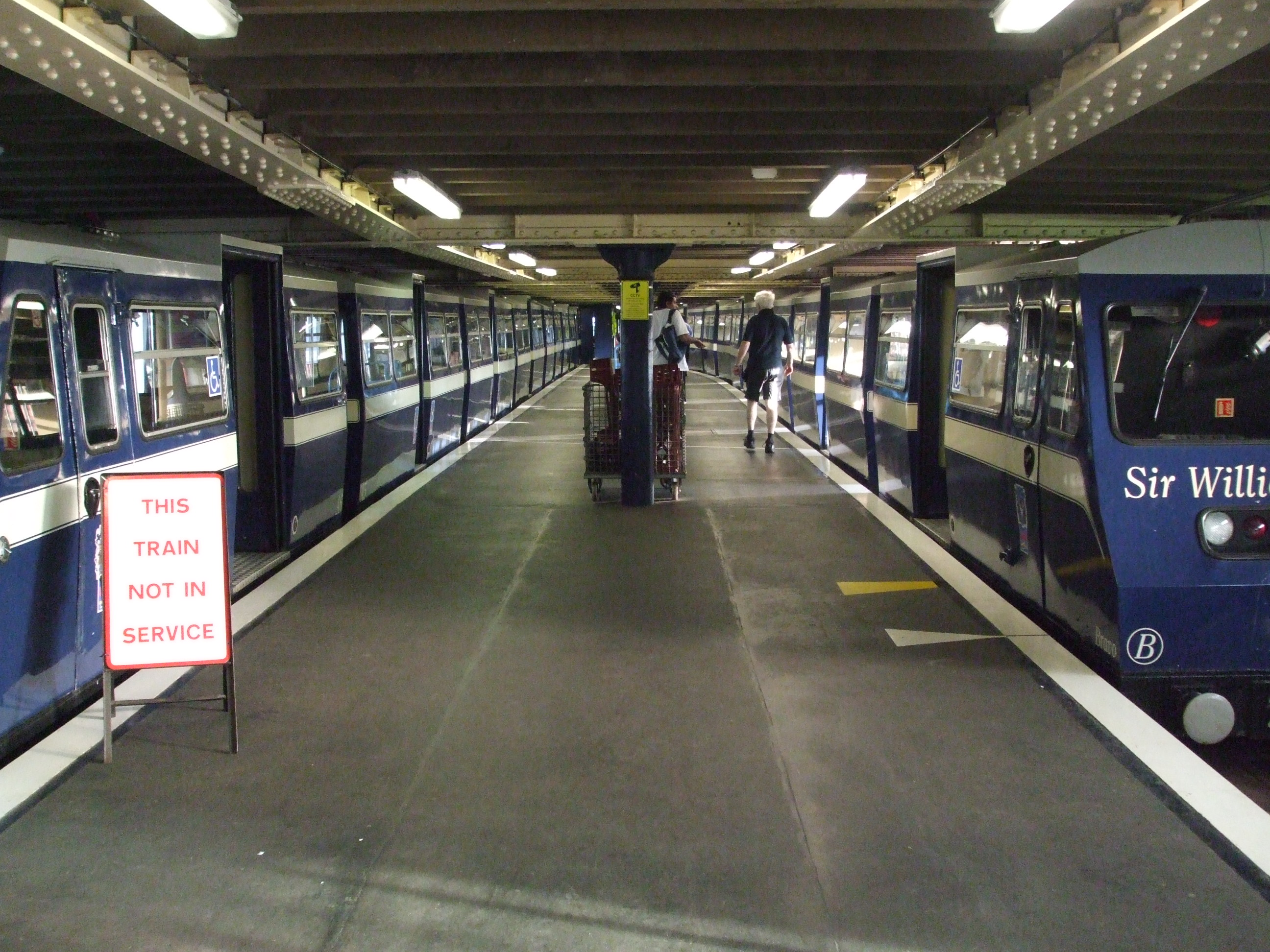
Shore station looking south, with both trains present.

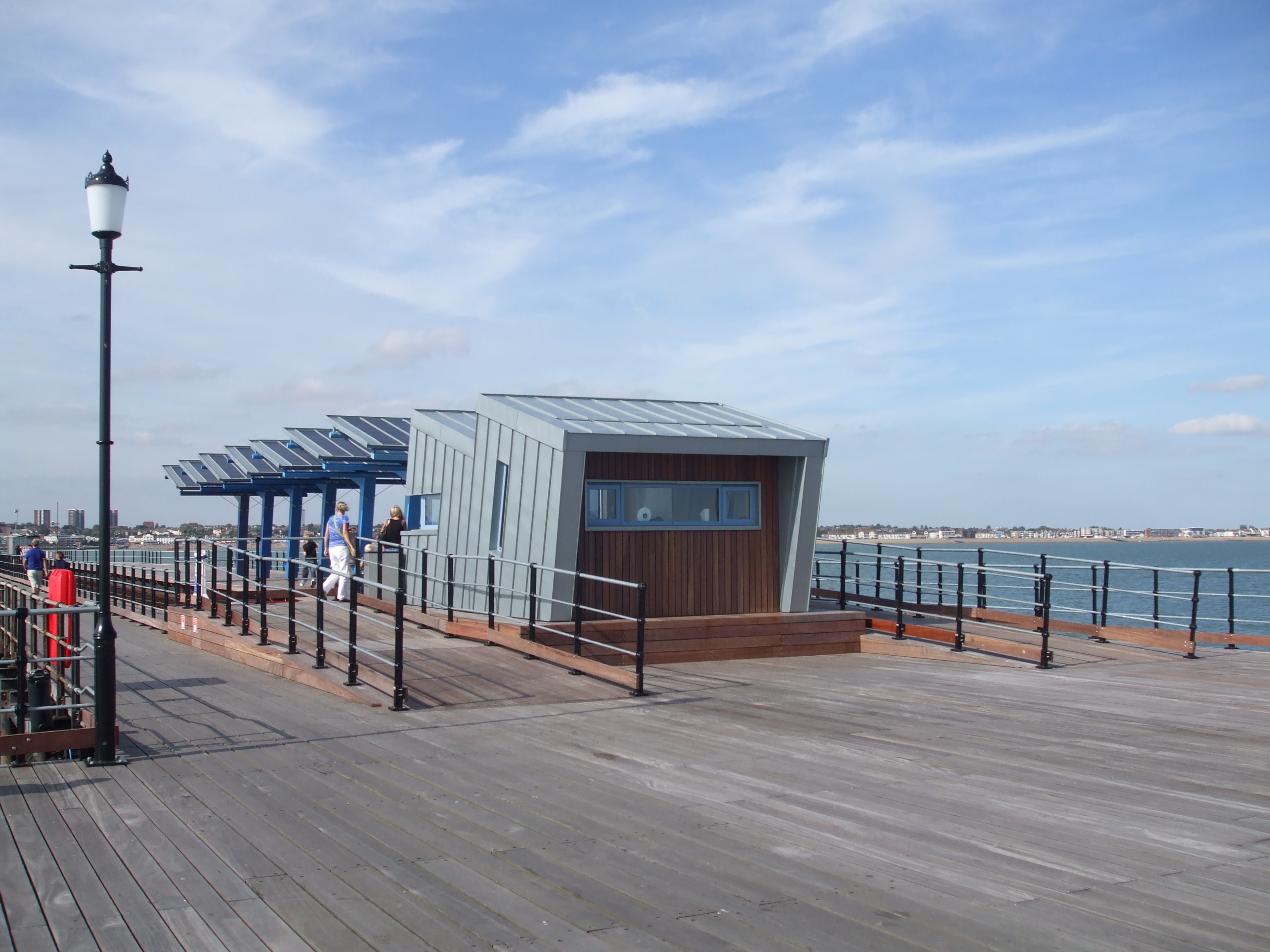
Pier Head station

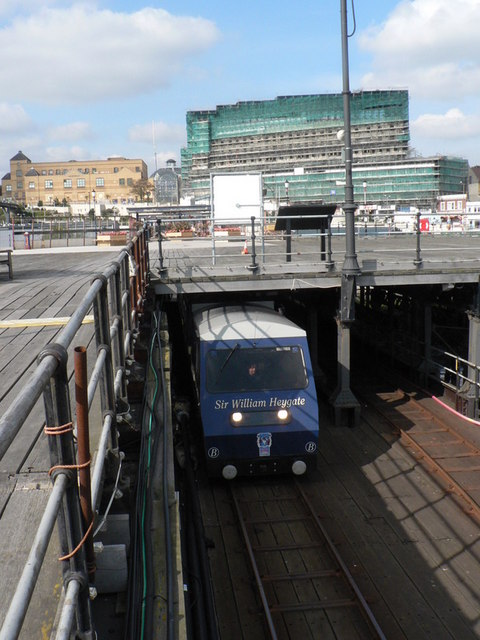
Sir William Heygate emerging from Shore terminus in 2008.

== See also ==
- Southend Cliff Railway

== Bibliography ==
- Booth, Adrian (1998). Peat Railways of Thorne and Hatfield Moors. Industrial Railway Society. ISBN 978-1-901556-04-9.
- Bride, Alderman H N (1962). The Story of Southend Pier. Corporation of Southend-on-Sea.
- Easdown, Martin (2007). Southend Pier. Tempus. ISBN 978-0-7524-4215-0.
- Frost, K A (1965). The Southend Pier Railway. Signal Transport Papers No. 3. Peter R Davis.
- Frost, K A; Carson, D J (1990). The Southend Pier Railway (2nd ed.). Romford: Ian Hnery Publications. ISBN 978-0-86025-431-7.
- IRS (2012). Industrial Locomotives Handbook 16EL. Industrial Railway Society. ISBN 978-1-901556-78-0.
