= PS Tilbury =

British passenger vessel

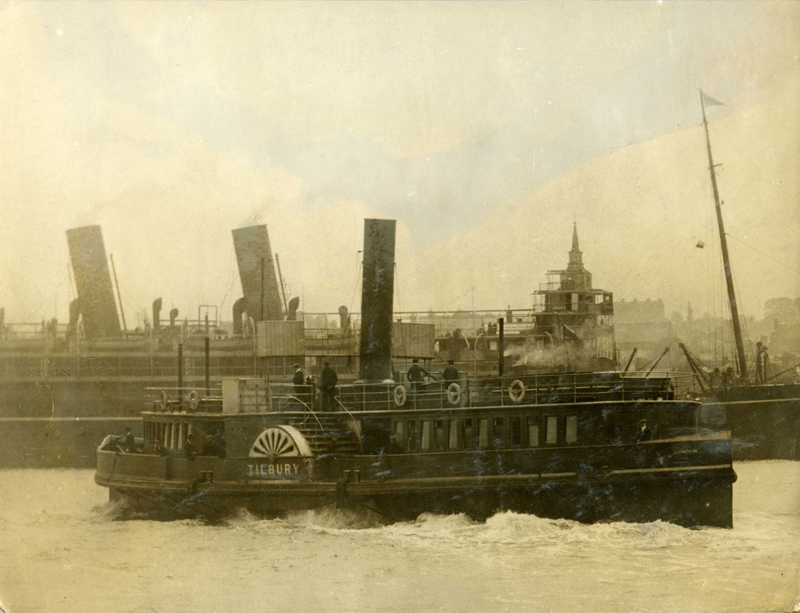
- Tilbury in 1883

History
- Name: 1883–1922: PS Tilbury
- Operator: 1883–1912: London, Tilbury and Southend Railway; 1912–1922: Midland Railway
- Port of registry: (United Kingdom)
- Builder: J and K Smit, Kinderdijk, Holland
- Launched: 1883
- Out of service: 1922
- Fate: Scrapped 1922

General characteristics
- Tonnage: 269 gross register tons (GRT)
- Length: 140 feet (43 m)
- Beam: 22.05 feet (6.72 m)
- Draught: 8.15 feet (2.48 m)

PS Tilbury was a passenger vessel built for the London, Tilbury and Southend Railway in 1883.

== History ==
PS Tilbury was built by J and K Smit, Kinderdijk, Rotterdam for the London, Tilbury and Southend Railway as a Gravesend–Tilbury Ferry. She was their first twin-screw vessel. She was launched in 1883. She was fitted with double action steering gear. On 21 September 1883 she underwent a trial trip.

She was acquired by the Midland Railway in 1912 and scrapped in 1922.
