= Southend Cliff Railway =

Funicular running from the clifftop to the beach in Southend

Coordinates: 51°32′01″N 0°42′39″E

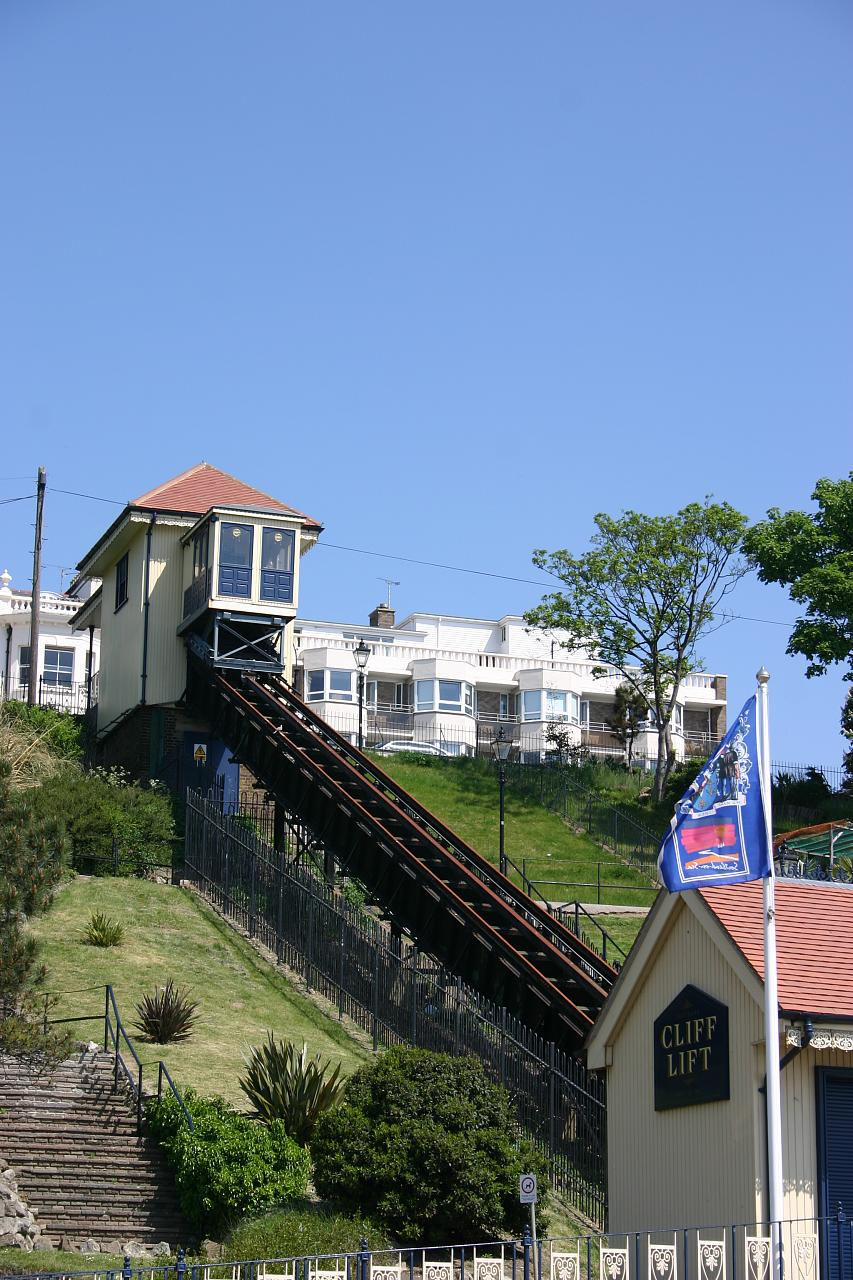
Southend Cliff Railway

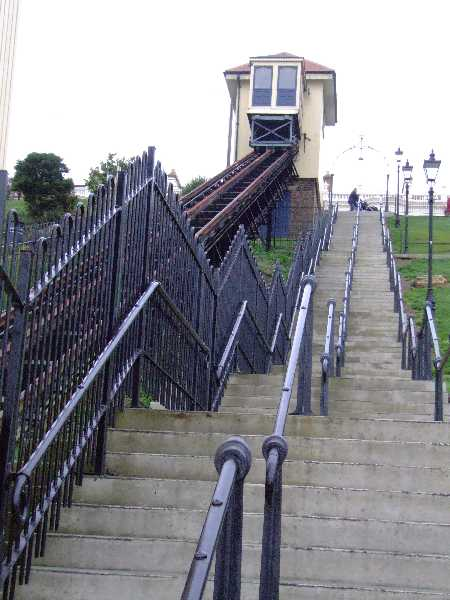
Stairs of the railway

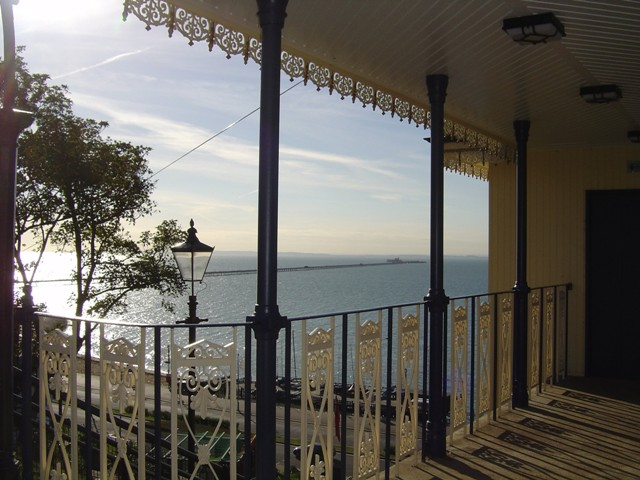
View from the top station across the Thames Estuary, with Southend Pier in the background

The Southend Cliff Railway, or Southend Cliff Lift, is an inclined lift in the English city of Southend-on-Sea, constructed in 1912. The lift operated for the first time on Bank Holiday Monday, in August of that year.

== Technical details ==
The line is owned and operated by the Pier and Foreshore Department of Southend-on-Sea City Council, and has the following technical parameters:

- Cars: 1
- Capacity: 12 passengers per car
- Configuration: Single track (with separate counterweight track that runs immediately below the main track for the passenger car).
- Gradient: 43,4%
- Height difference: 57 feet (17 m)
- Length: 130 feet (40 m)
- Track gauge (main track): 4 ft 6 in (1,372 mm)
- track gauge of counterweight: 21 in (533 mm)
- Speed: 0.93 miles per hour (1.50 km/h)
- Traction: 22 horsepower (16 kW) electric motor
- Weights: car 2,200 lb (1,000 kg), counterweight 2,899 lb (1,315 kg)

== Operation ==
The line operates daily between 10:30 am and 3:00 pm subject to the availability of volunteer drivers and weather conditions. As of August 2023 travel is free but donations are welcome.

== History ==
The line runs on the site of a pioneering moving walkway, a forerunner of today's escalator. This was constructed in 1901 by the American engineer Jesse W. Reno, but soon proved noisy and unreliable due its exposed location. The current lift was constructed by Waygood & Company, now part of the Otis Elevator Company. Since opening in August 1912 it has been modernised three times, in 1930, 1959 and 1990. Each modernisation has resulted in the replacement of the car.

In 2004 the line was closed due to technical problems, and refurbishment was undertaken on the stations. However, during the time that it was closed, the regulations governing its operation changed, requiring modifications before it could be reopened. The line finally re-opened on 25 May 2010, after a restoration costing a total of £3 million, £650,000 on the car alone.

== See also ==
- Southend Pier Railway
