= PS Thames =

1868 British passenger vessel

History
- Name: 1868–1913: PS Thames
- Operator: 1868–1879: London and North Western Railway; 1879–1882: Great Western Railway; 1882–1912: London, Tilbury and Southend Railway; 1912–1913: Midland Railway
- Port of registry: (United Kingdom)
- Builder: Bowdler, Chaffer and Company, Liverpool
- Launched: 1868
- Out of service: 1913
- Fate: Withdrawn

General characteristics
- Tonnage: 125 gross register tons (GRT)
- Length: 106 feet (32 m)
- Beam: 20 feet (6.1 m)
- Draught: 8.5 feet (2.6 m)
- Propulsion: Steam engines by Fawcett, Preston and Company

PS Thames was a passenger vessel built for the London and North Western Railway in 1868.

== History ==
PS Thames was built by Bowdler, Chaffer and Company, Liverpool and launched in 1868. She was used for services on the River Mersey.

In 1879, she was acquired by the Great Western Railway where she was used as a tender at Plymouth.

In 1882, she was acquired by the London, Tilbury and Southend Railway. In 1912 she was then owned by the Midland Railway and withdrawn in 1913.
