= Hythe Pier, Railway and Ferry =

Transport link in Hampshire, England

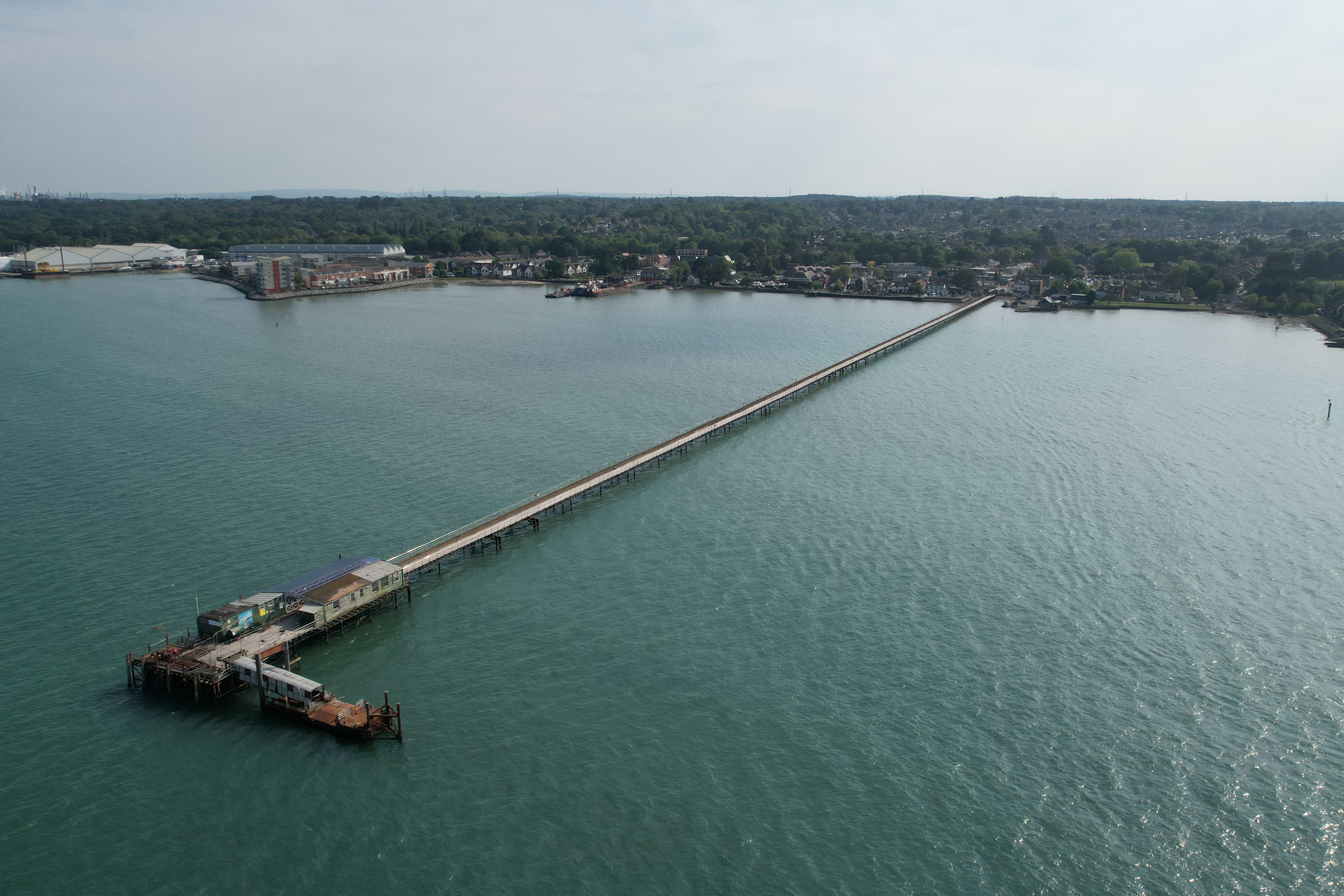
- Hythe Pier in May 2026

Overview
- Coordinates: 50°52′29″N 1°23′37″W
- Stations: 2

Service
- Type: Pier, railway and ferry
- Operator: Red Funnel
- Rolling stock: 2 locomotives; 4 bogie carriages; 1 flat car; 1 tank car

Listed Building – Grade II
- Official name: Hythe Pier
- Designated: 17 August 2021
- Reference no.: 1476460

Technical
- Track gauge: 2 ft (610 mm)

Hythe Pier, the Hythe Pier Railway and the Hythe Ferry provide a link between the port of Southampton and Hythe on the other side of Southampton Water. It is used both by commuters and tourists, and forms an important link in the Solent Way, England Coast Path and E9 European coastal paths. The railway is the oldest continuously-operating public pier train in the world. The ferry was last owned and operated by Red Funnel who purchased it in 2023, but liquidated the ferry service in April 2026 after damaging the landing stage in 2024. The pier, tracks and building are owned by The Hythe Pier Company. Hythe Pier Heritage Association have taken ownership of the tractors and carriages upon restoration of each unit.

== Hythe Pier ==
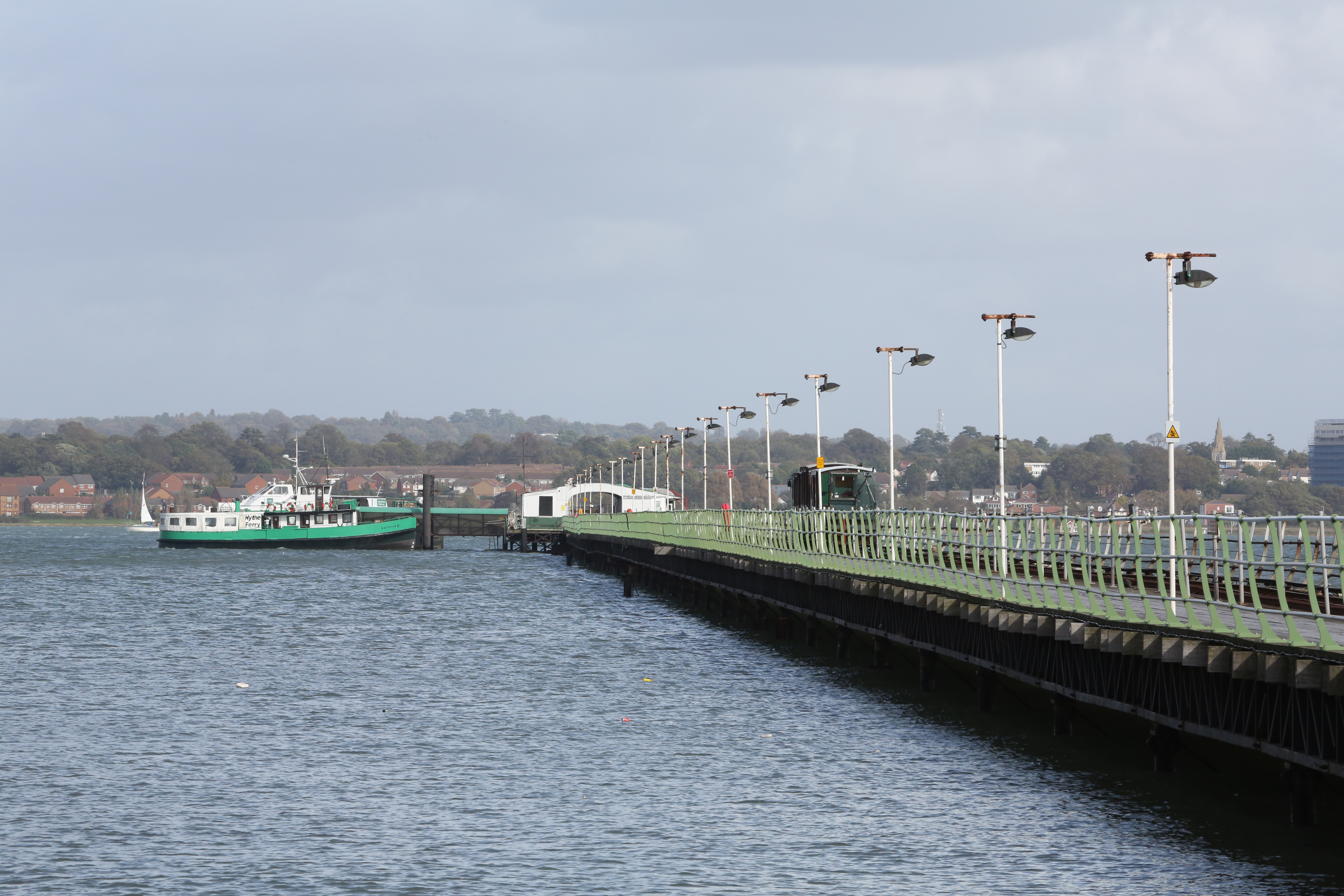
Hythe Pier from the Hythe shore

Hythe Pier stretches 700 yards (640 m) from the centre of Hythe to the deep water channel of Southampton Water, making it the 7th-longest pier in the UK. It is approximately 16 feet (4.9 m) wide, and carries a pedestrian walkway and cycleway on its northern side and the Hythe Pier Railway on its southern side. During normal high tides the pier is 4 feet (1.2 m) above the surface of the water.

A company, the Hythe and Southampton Steam Ferry Company, was formed to construct a pier in 1870. It obtained the Hythe Pier Order 1871 in order to do so. This effort then stalled and a pier was not constructed.

A second company, Hythe Pier and Hythe and Southampton Ferry Company, was formed in late 1874. A new Hythe Pier Order 1875 was passed by Parliament but legal disagreements with the Southampton Harbour and Pier Board delayed progress until 1878. Construction started in 1879 and the pier opened on 1 January 1881 having cost £7,000 to construct. Originally there was a toll house at the landward end of the pier, and this was replaced by the present ticket office in the first decade of the 20th century. The original toll house still exists and is occupied by a local travel operator. Large scale maintenance was carried out on the pier in 1896 at a cost of £1,500.

A local community group held a public meeting on 24 November 2016 and announced its intentions to "save Hythe Pier and ferry" by setting up a Charitable Community Benefit Society under the name Hythe Pier Heritage Association. In February 2017 Hampshire County Council made an emergency payment to White Horse Ferries to allow them to charter a replacement ferry while MV Great Expectations underwent maintenance.

The pier and its associated structures were awarded Grade II listed status in August 2021.

On 6 February 2019, 140 years after the original pier construction, Blue Funnel announced they intended to hand over the pier to the Hythe Pier Heritage Association. However, this never happened, and on 18 November 2024, Blue Funnel confirmed the sale of the pier to a newly formed entity called The Hythe Pier Company Ltd.

== Hythe Pier Railway ==
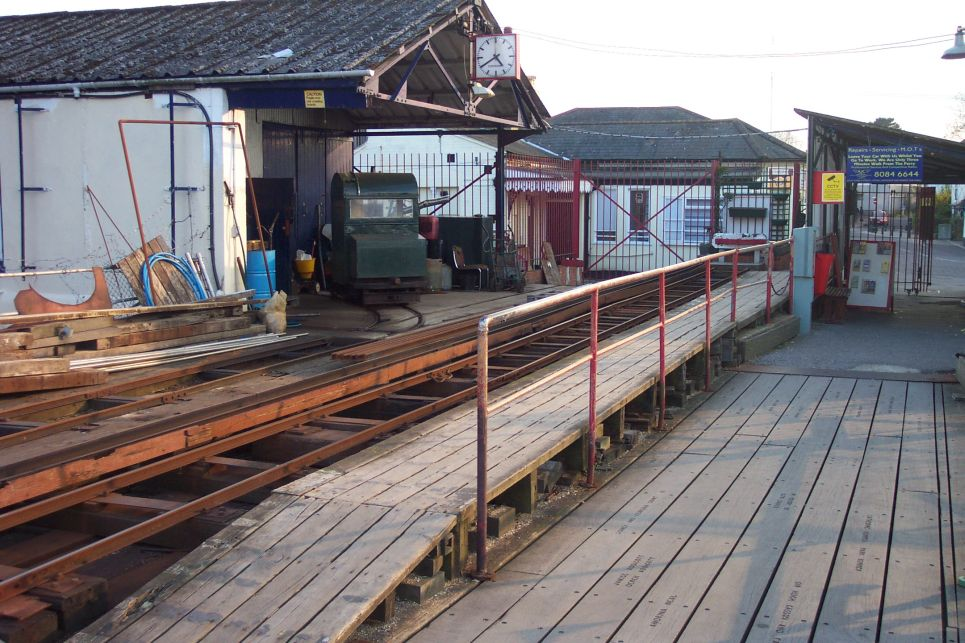
The landward station, with depot and spare locomotive

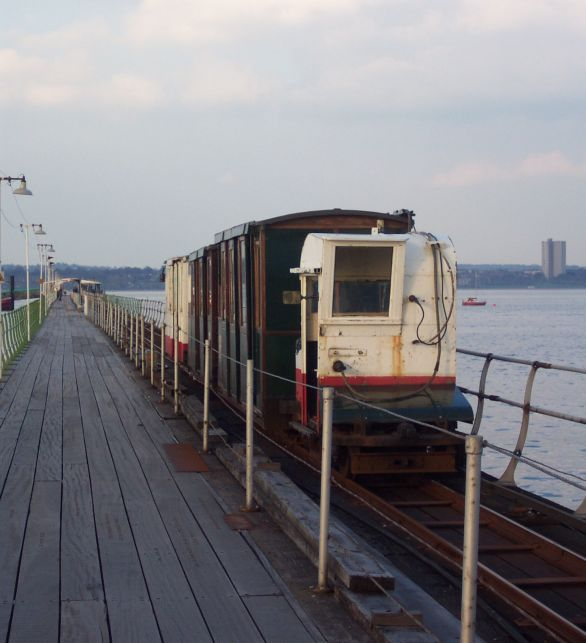
The pier with the pier train

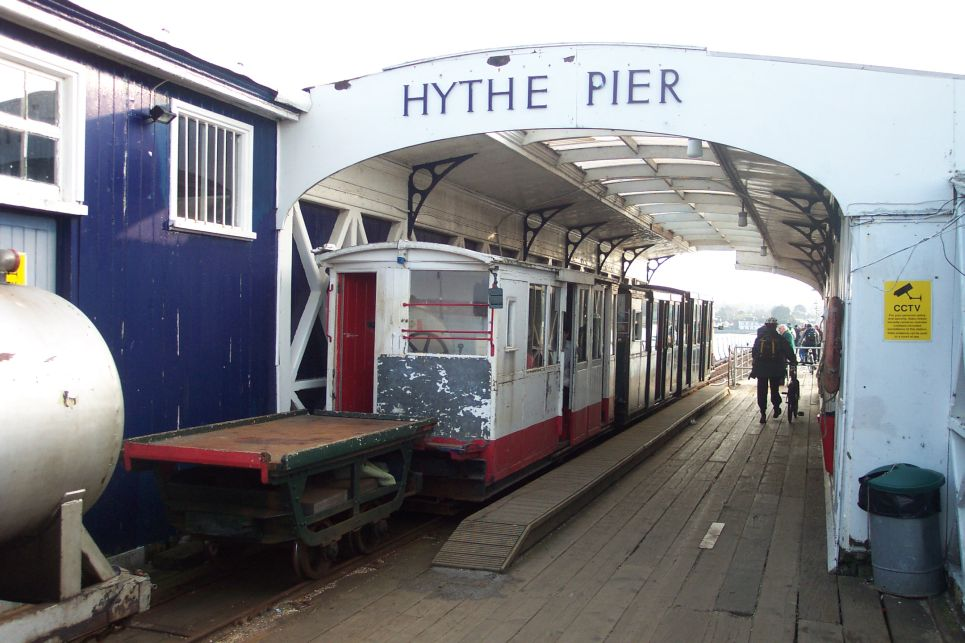
The pier head station

Section 8 of the Hythe Pier Order 1875 made provision for the construction of a tramway along the pier, although one was not originally laid. The hand carts that carried luggage along the pier were found to be damaging the pier decking, and in 1909 a narrow gauge rail and two wagons were installed on the northern side of the pier to replace them. The wagons were hand-propelled along the track that was laid flush with the pier decking.

In 1922, the current electrified railway was constructed on the southern side of the pier. The track is laid to 2 ft (610 mm) narrow gauge and is electrified at 250V DC by a third rail on the seaward side of the track. The line consists of a single track with no passing loops, with two non-electrified sidings at the landward end. One of the sidings enters the line's covered workshop which includes a maintenance pit. Stations, equipped with low wooden platforms, exist at both ends of the line. The pier head station has an overall roof, whilst the landward station has a ticket office and waiting shelter.

The line is operated by two four-wheeled electric locomotives built in 1917 by Brush with works numbers 16302 & 16307 (simply renumbered as No. 2 & No. 1 – the '7' looking like a '1'.). They were originally 100v battery powered, being used at the World War I mustard gas factory at Avonmouth. They were transferred to Hythe after the war, where they were converted to collect power from a third rail and had their batteries removed. There was initially a third locomotive, but it was used for spares and finally scrapped in 1935. All that remains of the 3rd tractor is the electric motor bearing the serial number "16304".

The line owns four bogie passenger coaches built by Drewry, two of which have a driving cab at their seaward ends. In normal operation the single train is made up of one of the locomotives propelling three passenger coaches, with a four-wheel flat car (made from one of the original 1909 hand propelled wagons, but modified to carry bikes in 2026) for baggage. The locomotive is always at the landward end, and the seaward passenger coach must have a driving cab. The line also has a four-wheel oil-tanker, used to carry fuel to the ferries.

== Hythe Ferry ==
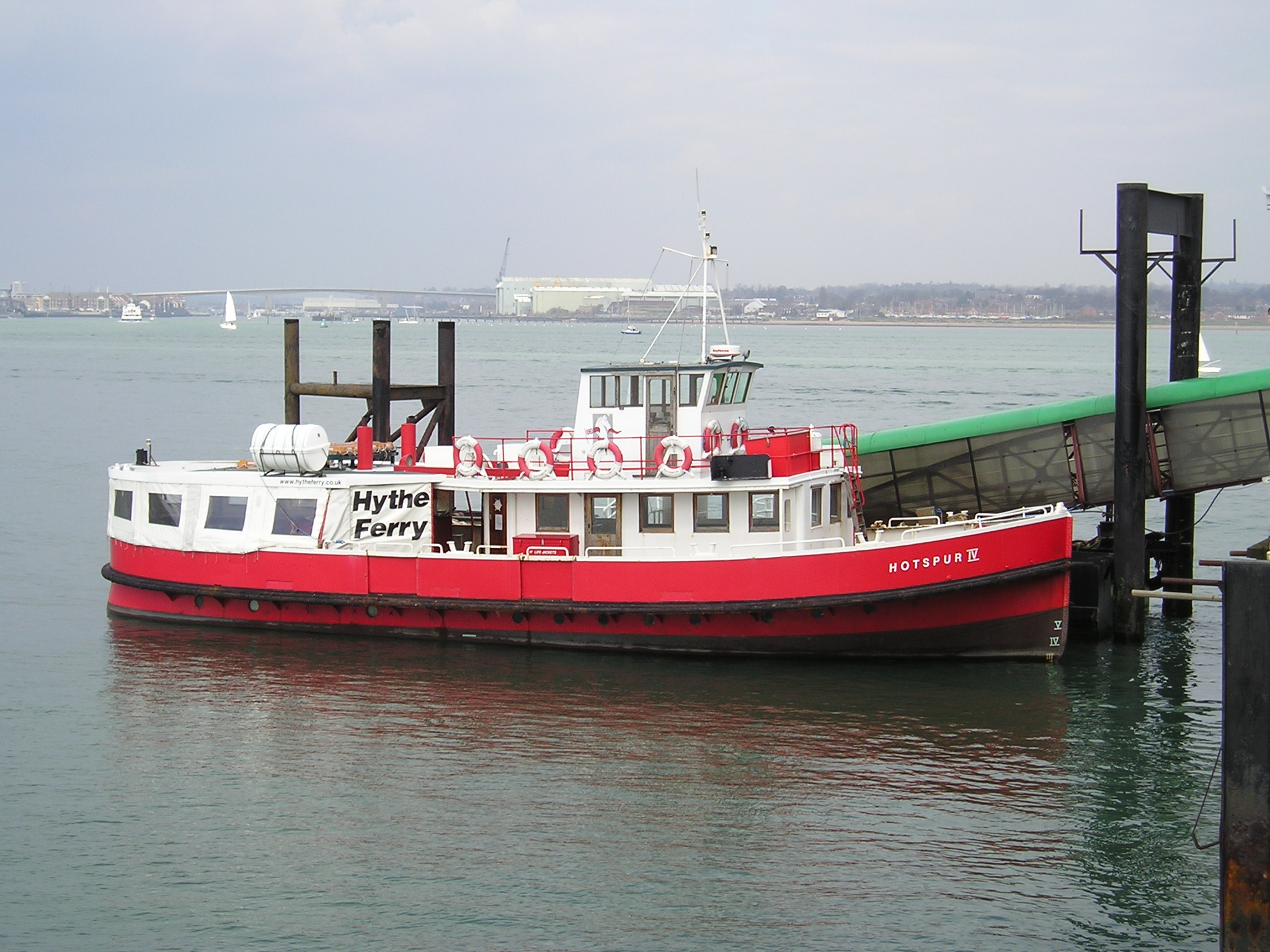
The Hotspur IV at the pier head

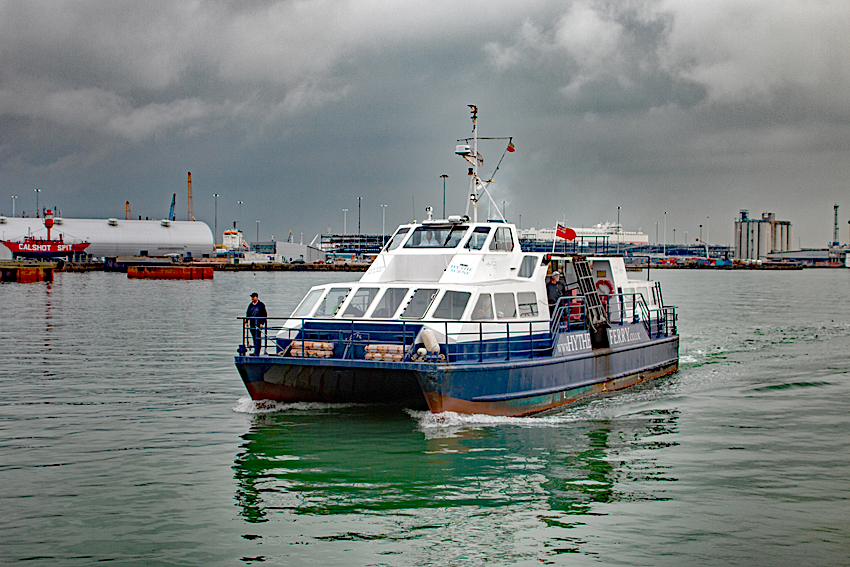
Hythe Scene approaching Town Quay

Every train connected at the pier head with an arrival and departure of the Hythe Ferry. The ferry carried passengers and bicycles, and took about 10 minutes for the crossing. En route, the ferry passed the terminal used by the passenger liners Queen Mary 2 and Queen Victoria and by other cruise ships, giving good views of the vessels when they were in port.

The Southampton terminal is at the Town Quay, also the terminal of the Red Funnel ferries to the Isle of Wight. Town Quay is a short walk from the city centre, and is linked to both the city centre and Southampton Central railway station by bus.

A ferry has operated from Hythe to Southampton since the Middle Ages, and it is marked on a map of 1575 by Christopher Saxton. Steam vessels were introduced in 1830. From 1889, the Percy family were involved in the running of the ferry, and from 1900 to 1980 the service was run by the General Estates Company, owned by the Percy family. As a consequence of this, many of the ferries used carried the name Hotspur, named after Henry Percy or Hotspur, who was immortalised by William Shakespeare.

From 1991 to 2017, the ferry was operated by White Horse Ferries Between 2017 and 2023, Blue Funnel operated the ferry until it was sold to Red Funnel.

The ferry was suspended on 22 August 2024 due to issues with the pontoon at the Hythe Pier. On 9 April 2026 the Hythe and Southampton Ferry Company was put into voluntary liquidation by its parent company, Red Funnel/Njord Partners.. The Hythe Pier Company, who owns the pier itself, purchased the assets from the liquidators in June 2026.

== Collisions ==
On 30 July 1885, the pier was hit by the schooner Annie, damaging five of the pier's piles. On 26 August 1915 the pier was hit by the sailing barge Itchen although on this occasion there was no damage to the pier. The pier's piles were again damaged in 1945 when an infantry landing craft collided with it.

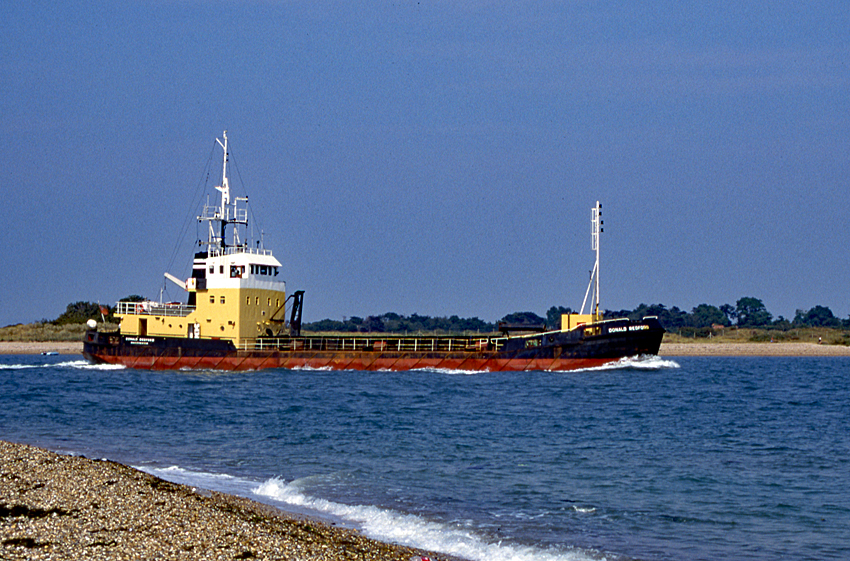
Donald Redford leaving Langstone Harbour

In the evening of 1 November 2003 at 18:08, the dredger Donald Redford collided with the pier, tearing a 150 feet (46 m) hole through the midsection and isolating the pier head from the land. The dredger did not collide with the pier train, and there were no casualties. The incident occurred a few minutes after a crowd of people were heading home after a football match. Repairs to the pier were carried out by Dudley Barnes Marine with Beckett Rankine as the designer; the cost was £308,000 and the pier reopened on 7 January 2004. The master of the dredger was sentenced to eight months in prison after pleading guilty to an act likely to cause the death of or serious injury to any person while under the influence of drink and causing damage to a structure while under the influence of drinking.

On 13 May 2016, the ferry Uriah Heep collided with the pier damaging the ferry's wheelhouse and requiring it to be withdrawn from service. The Marine Accident Investigation Branch report concluded the loss of control leading to the collision was almost certainly from a mechanical failure within the hydraulic circuit that powered the thrust deflector. The report also noted the inner berth at Hythe (used by smaller vessels) afforded little space to abort an approach in the event of a malfunction.
