= White Horse Ferries =

White Horse Ferries Limited
- Industry: Shipping
- Headquarters: Swindon, United Kingdom
- Area served: Solent
- Services: Passenger transportation
- Parent: Whitehorse

White Horse Ferries is a company that previously operated a ferry on the English south coast. It is a member of the White Horse group of sister companies.

== Hythe Pier, Railway and Ferry ==
They operated the Hythe Ferry, pier and pier railway from 1991 until its sale to Blue Funnel Cruises Ltd on 19 April 2017.

== Gravesend–Tilbury Ferry 1991-2000 ==
White Horse ferries operated the Gravesend–Tilbury Ferry from 1991. It ceased to operate the service following entry into receivership in 2000.

== Lay Construction Ltd ==
The White Horse Group sister company Lay Construction Ltd constructed ferries for White Horse Ferries at Clifton Slipways, West Street, Gravesend.
