= Port of Leith =

Port in Edinburgh, Scotland, UK

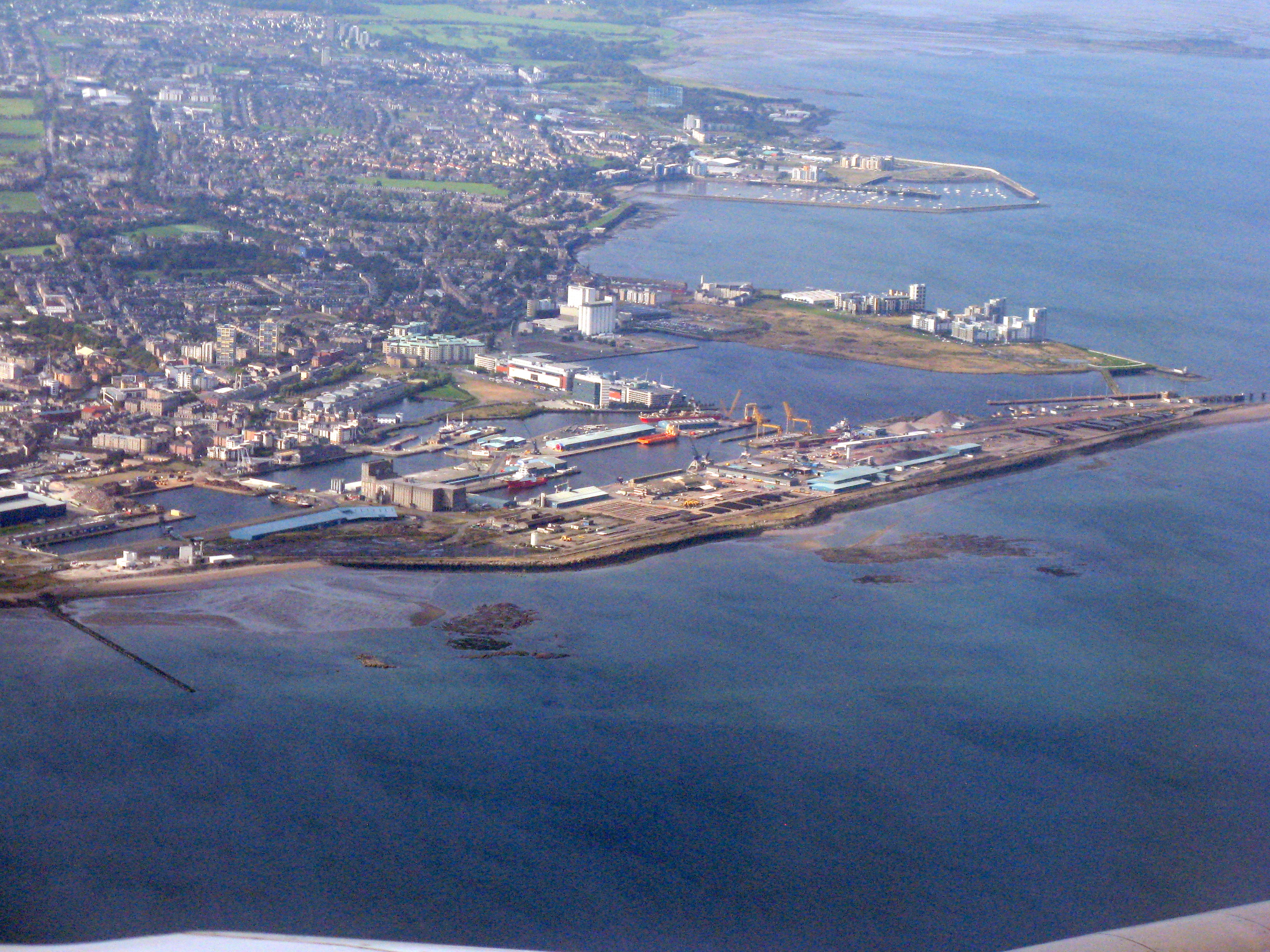
- The Port of Leith and Granton Harbour
- Interactive map of Port of Leith
- Location within Scotland

Location
- Country: Scotland
- Location: Leith, Edinburgh
- Coordinates: 55°59′N 3°10′W
- UN/LOCODE: GBLEI

Details
- Operated by: Forth Ports Limited
- Owned by: Forth Ports Limited
- Type of Harbor: Deepwater commercial / enclosed docks
- No. of berths: 13
- Draft depth: 9.75 metres (32.0 ft)

Statistics
- Annual cargo tonnage: over 1 million tonnes annually
- Website https://www.forthports.co.uk/our-ports/leith-edinburgh/

The Port of Leith is a major seaport facility on Scotland’s east coast, serving the city of Edinburgh. It is operated by Forth Ports, and is Scotland’s largest enclosed deep-water port. Much of the port is built on reclaimed land, with the shore moving northwards over the years.

From the 1990s onward, Leith has seen major regeneration. Projects include the Ocean Terminal shopping complex (with the permanently berthed royal yacht HMY Britannia) and the Victoria Quay offices of the Scottish Government.

== History ==
Leith has been a port since the Middle Ages, with early quays along the Water of Leith. It is one of the oldest ports in the UK, with a recorded mention c. 1329. Early development included quay walls along the banks of the Water of Leith, however these were inadequate for the growing shipping trade in the late 18th century. The civil engineer John Rennie was employed to design new docks and extended piers.

=== 18th century ===
The remains of a c. 1781 Navy Board Victualling Yard for arming and supplying ships were discovered between Baltic Street and Constitution Street, during archeological excavations in 2024. At this point, the coastline roughly followed the route of modern-day Tower Street, just to the north of the Naval Yard. During the excavations, remains of a sea wall were exposed. This was constructed from unbonded boulders and likely dates from the early-to-mid-18th century. The yard would have supplied Navy ships moored in Leith Roads (a safe anchorage off the coast of Leith, protected by Inchkeith) with various foods, beer, and other provisions using a lighter barge.

A 1789 "plan for the improvement of Leith Harbour" proposed by Robert Whitworth shows a new basin further up the Water of Leith, to the east of the modern West Bowling Street Bridge. It included two basins around 200 by 500 ft (61 by 152 m) with adjacent warehouses. This would have been linked by a canal and a lock to the north of Sheriff Brae to the tidal harbour.

=== 19th century ===
In 1809, a Martello tower was built to defend the port against Napoleon. This circular defensive structure was over 30 ft (9.1 m) tall, with walls about 8 ft (2.4 m) thick, constructed of Ashlar from Rosyth quarry. It is locally known as the Tally Toor. It is about 1.2 km (3/4 mile) north of the Bernard Street bridge, originally built on a rocky outcrop at the edge of the Leith Sands known as the Mussel Cape Rocks, it was later surrounded by land reclamation for the port expansion in the 1960s.

The 1804 plan of Edinburgh and Leith by John Ainslie, shows proposed new docks connecting the harbour in the Water of Leith to Newhaven. This comprised two wet docks 250 by 100 yards (229 by 91 m) to the north of the Citadel. It also showed a larger wet dock 500 by 100 yd (457 by 91 m) which linked to New Haven dry harbour with a proposed new entrance, although these were never built.

The first wet dock opened in 1806, with construction of the East Dock taking around six years. This was followed by the West Dock, constructed 1810–1817. Both were 750 by 300 ft (229 by 91 m) with an entrance 30 ft (9.1 m) wide and 13 ft (4.0 m) deep at MHWN. The cost to construct the docks and entrance lock was £300,000. These docks were later infilled, and are now used as parking for the Scottish Government's Victoria Quay building. The entrance lock still remains, to the north of the pub "Teuchters Landing", which uses part of the swing bridge over the lock as a beer garden. A ship building yard was located on land to the north of the West Dock, with two graving docks.

Around 1824–1829, the western breakwater and pier was built, and the eastern pier extended by 1,500 feet (460 m). Later land reclamation infilled around the western breakwater, and this is now the site of Ocean Terminal complex.

In 1833 a significant expansion of the dock was proposed by the Superintendent of the Docks and Engineer to the Commission, Mr Peter Whyte. This would involve reclaiming vast areas of foreshore for new docks and quaysides within a wall 4,400 ft (0.83 mi; 1.3 km) long, plus deepening the access channel to the open sea. Located to the north-east of the existing port, this foreshore was sandy, drying at low spring tides but covered by up to 16 ft (4.9 m) at high water. An area around 350 acres (140 ha) was enclosed by a sea wall or reclamation embankment. This was hand packed rubble, about 22 ft (6.7 m) wide at the base, and 9 ft (2.7 m) at the top, the seaward side faced with concrete blocks. It was eventually completed in June 1896.

In 1846, construction of the Victoria Dock commenced to the north of the West and East Docks, along with further expansion of the West and East Piers. These extended in a north-westerly direction past the Martello Tower, to the location of the modern sea lock. The Victoria Dock opened in 1852, at a cost of £180,000. This was also 750 by 300 ft (229 by 91 m), and had an entrance 60 ft (18 m) wide and 20 ft (6.1 m) deep at MHWN.

In 1859, the Prince of Wales Dry Dock was completed on the eastern side of the harbour. This cost around £60,000, and was 382 ft (116 m) long with an entrance 70 ft (21 m) wide. By 1981 it was no longer in use as a dry dock.

Between 1862 and 1869 the Albert Dock was constructed on the east side of the port. The dock was 1,100 by 450 ft (340 by 140 m) with an entrance lock 350 by 60 ft (107 by 18 m) and a depth over the sill at MHWN of 22 ft (6.7 m). The dock was opened by the steamship "Florence". It was designed by James Rendel of London and George Robinson of Leith, and cost £350,000. Construction required the reclamation of some 84 acres (34 ha) of the Leith Sands, formerly used for the Leith Races horse racing.

Between 1871 and 1874, the Victoria Swing Bridge was constructed to provide better access between the east and west sides of the docks. This carried two railway tracks, plus walkways either side.

In 1874, work began on a large land reclamation project and construction of the Edinburgh Dock, located to the east of the Albert Dock. Around 100 acres (40 ha) was reclaimed, with the construction of a sea wall of great strength, completed in 1877. The Edinburgh Dock was C-shaped, overall 1,500 by 650 ft (460 by 200 m) with a tongue in the middle projecting from the eastern end 1,000 by 250 ft (305 by 76 m). This had a dry dock at the western end 300 by 40 ft (91 by 12 m). The construction cost £500,000 and the engineers were again Rendel and Robertson. The dock was opened by HRH The Duke of Edinburgh, Alfred, Duke of Saxe-Coburg and Gotha.

In 1896, the Alexandra Dry Dock was opened. This was 335 by 48 ft (102 by 15 m), designed by Whyte. It is located just to the south of the Prince of Wales dock.

In 1897, work began on the Imperial Dock, the largest in the port, at 1,900 by 550 ft (580 by 170 m), with an entrance lock 340 by 70 ft (104 by 21 m), and depth of the sill at MHWN of 27 ft (8.2 m). It was also designed by Whyte, and completed in 1904 at a cost of £700,000. The Imperial Dock is located to the north of the Albert Dock, with a channel linking the two.

=== 20th century ===
In 1912, the Imperial Dry Dock opened. This is located at the north-western corner of the Imperial Dock, and is 550 by 70 ft (168 by 21 m).

In 1938, the Leith Dock Commission, a fully autonomous trust to control the affairs of the harbour, was set up by an act of Parliament. This facilitated future development. Previously, the affairs were managed by commissioners from Leith and Edinburgh city councils, but with control dominated by Edinburgh.

In 1936, work began on enclosing the Western Harbour with long breakwaters, completed in 1943. This increased the size of the docks by a further 230 acres (93 ha).

The Imperial Dock grain elevator, constructed in 1933–34 and extended in the 1950s–60s, reflected the port's importance in bulk grain handling. Despite opposition from groups including the Cockburn Association, the category B listed building was demolished in 2021, to enable a new renewable energy hub.

A deep-water sea lock was added in 1968. This was completed in 1969, and transformed the whole harbour into a deep water port for ships with a draught of up to 35 ft (11 m). The lock was 850 ft long by 110 ft wide (259 by 34 m), built within a cofferdam 1,700 ft (520 m) long. The lock was opened on 28 May 1969 by Prince Philip, the Duke of Edinburgh.

=== 21st century ===
In 2018, former Northern Lighthouse Board vessel MV Fingal opened as a boutique hotel. It is moored in the Alexandra Dock (former dry dock).

First Stage Studios took over a large warehouse at the port, having secure £1m investment from Screen Scotland in 2020. The facility was formerly used to build the Pelamis Wave Energy Converter, and parts of Avengers: Infinity War were filmed there.

Between July 2022 and July 2023, the MS Victoria was docked in the Port of Leith, and used to house between 700 and 1000 Ukrainian refugees fleeing the Russian invasion.

On 22 March 2023, 35 people were injured when the US Navy owned ship RV Petrel tipped over whilst in the Imperial Dry Dock. Twelve people were treated on site by the Scottish Ambulance Service, with 23 taken to hospital, nine whom were discharged by the next morning. Wind gusts of 38 to 44 mph (61 to 71 km/h; 17 to 20 m/s) had been recorded that morning.

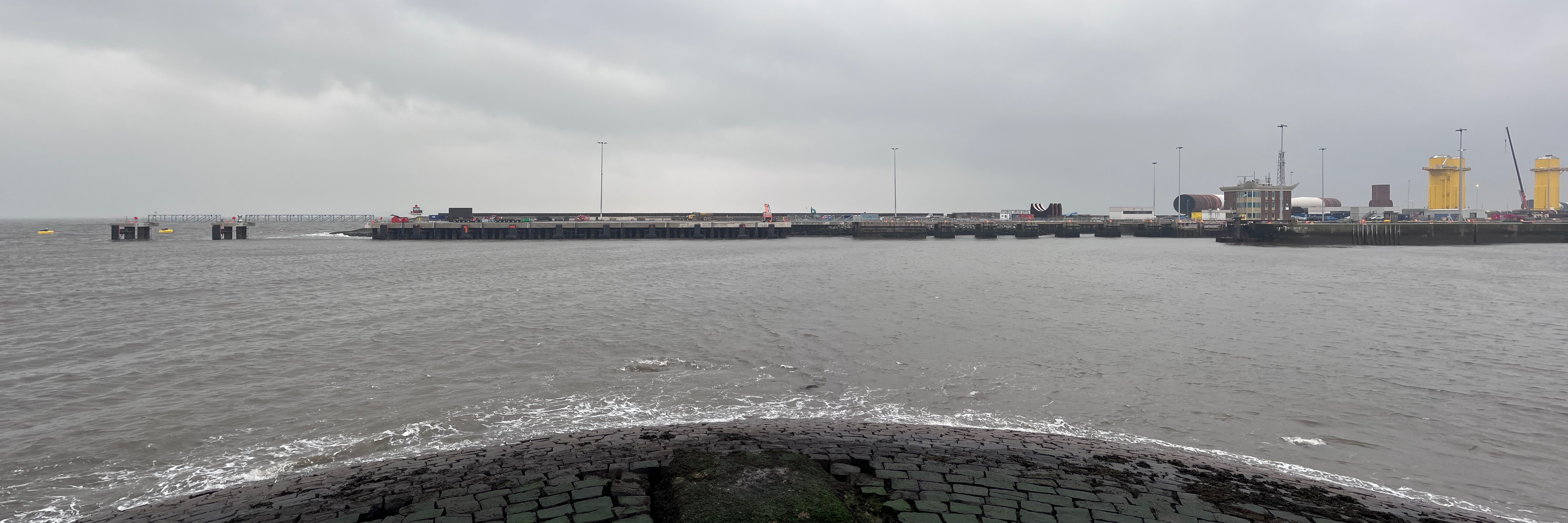
Charles Hammond Berth from the end of the Western Harbour breakwater

In April 2025, a new deep-water quay opened to the north of the sea lock. This is named the Charles Hammond Berth after the former CEO who had retired in 2024 after 23 years. It is designed to handle the large vessels used in the construction of offshore wind farms. The quayside has a load capacity of 100 tonnes/m^{2}, with 175 acres (71 ha) of adjacent space for logistics and marshalling.

== Facilities and operations ==
Leith handles cruise ships, breakbulk, dry bulk cargo, containers, and project cargo. It has no oil tanker facilities. Vessels of up to 50,000 tons deadweight (DWT) can be accommodated. The port also has two dry docks and supports mobilisation and demobilisation for the offshore energy sector.

The port was once the busiest on the east coast of Scotland, handling over 4.6 million tons of cargo in 1913, including over 3 million tons of exports. In the 1940s, there were over 1000 dockers and 100 crane operators employed in the Port of Leith; by 2019 this had dropped to around 19. The bulk cargo handled by the port reduced in the 1970s with the advent of containerization. The restricted road to Leith access meant much of the container traffic was instead handled at Grangemouth.

In the 1980s, the port was used to support the construction of north sea oil pipelines. The steel pipes were unloaded, lined with cement at the port, and then shipped out to the oil fields.

In 2023, Leith became the first large mainland Scottish port to provide shore power connections for ships.

In December 2024, Forth Ports announced a £50 million investment linked to the Inch Cape Offshore Wind Farm, creating around 50 jobs and upgrading infrastructure. The port will be used to handle the wind turbine foundations, while the turbine assembly will be managed from Dundee.

== Ownership and strategy ==
The port is owned and operated by Forth Ports Limited, which also manages ports at Grangemouth, Rosyth, Dundee and Tilbury. Leith forms part of the Forth Green Freeport and plays a central role in Scotland’s offshore renewables supply chain.

== See also ==
- Leith
- Ocean Terminal, Edinburgh
- Forth Ports
- Western Harbour, Edinburgh
- Royal Yacht Britannia

== Bibliography ==
- Paxton, Roland; Shipway, Jim (2007), Civil engineering heritage. Scotland - Lowlands and Borders, London: Telford, ISBN 978-0-7277-3487-7
- Kerr, John (1981). Paxton, Roland (ed.). "Historical aspects of Leith Docks". Our engineering heritage : three notable examples in the Edinburgh area : Dean Bridge, Leith Docks, Forth Rail Bridge. Edinburgh: Institution of Civil Engineers. Edinburgh and East of Scotland Association.
