= Western Harbour, Edinburgh =

Suburb of Edinburgh, Scotland

Coordinates: 55°59′8.21″N 3°11′30.26″W

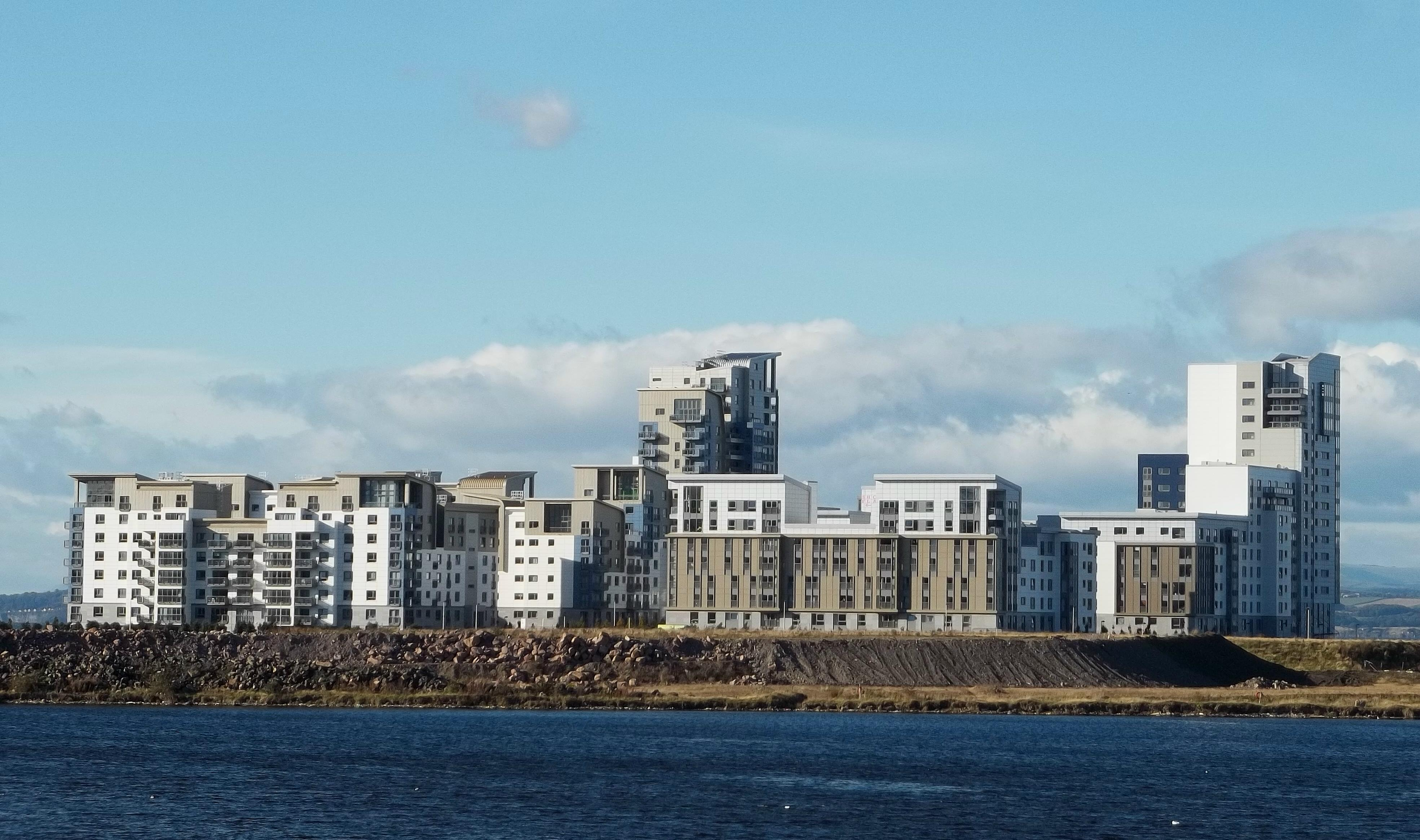
Leith Newhaven Harbour

Western Harbour is a mainly residential development in the Newhaven area of Edinburgh, the capital city Scotland.

== History ==
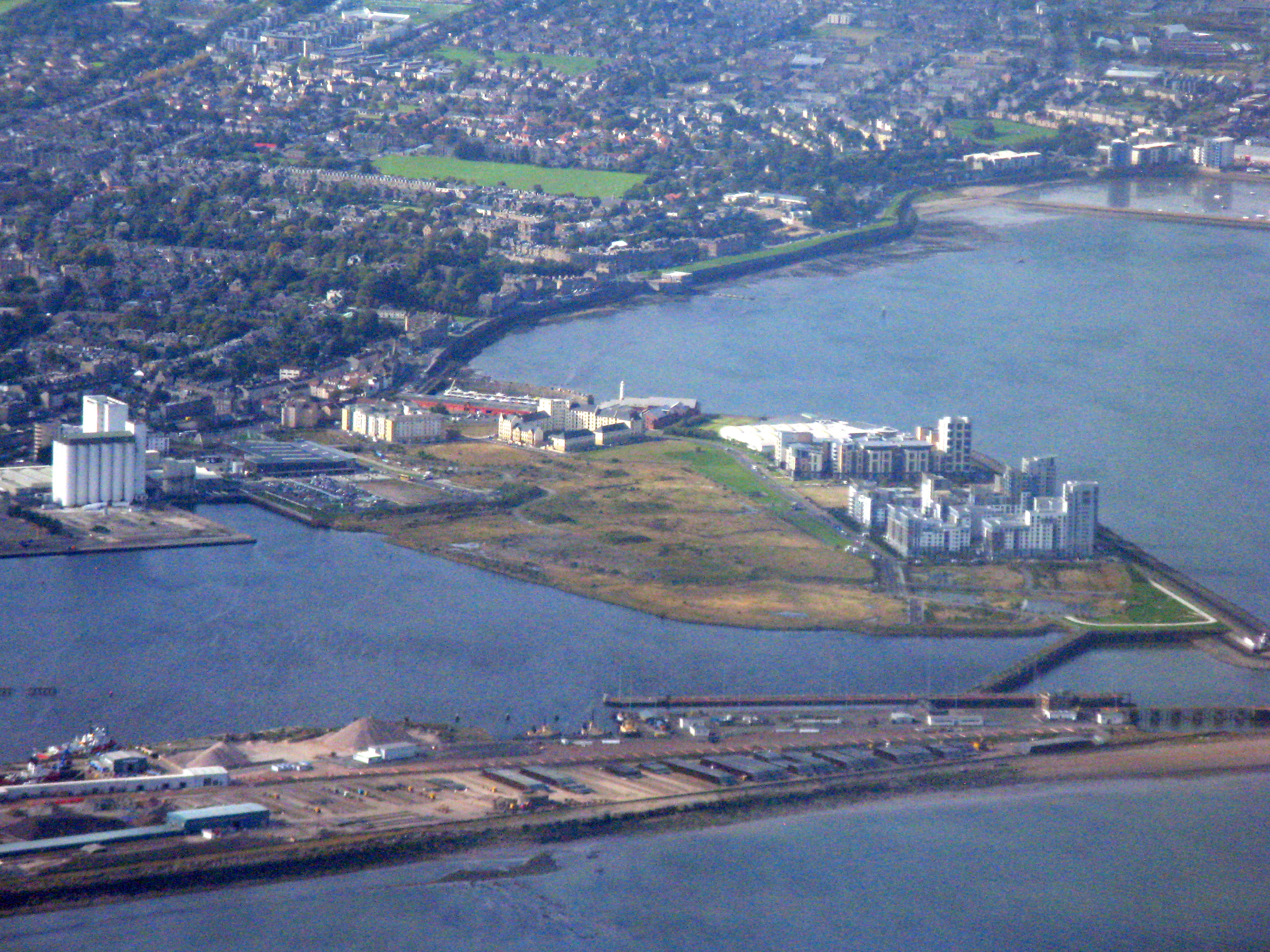
Western Harbour and the Dock gate

Between 1936 and 1942 the Port of Leith's western harbour was created by the construction of two breakwaters, the western of them running out from Newhaven into the Firth of Forth.

A large area of land to the east of the western breakwater has since been reclaimed through landfill, on the opposite side of the water to Ocean Terminal.

In 2003, it was the location for the 2003 MTV Europe Music Awards. The awards ceremony was held in a 6,000 capacity big top arena constructed specifically for the main event.

In 2004 the owner of the Docks, Forth Ports, announced plans to carry out a major redevelopment of the area. The planned development, which was given supplementary planning guidance by the City of Edinburgh Council in 2004, will be the size of a small town with up to 17,000 new homes. The new urbanist masterplan was designed by the new classical office of ADAM Architecture.

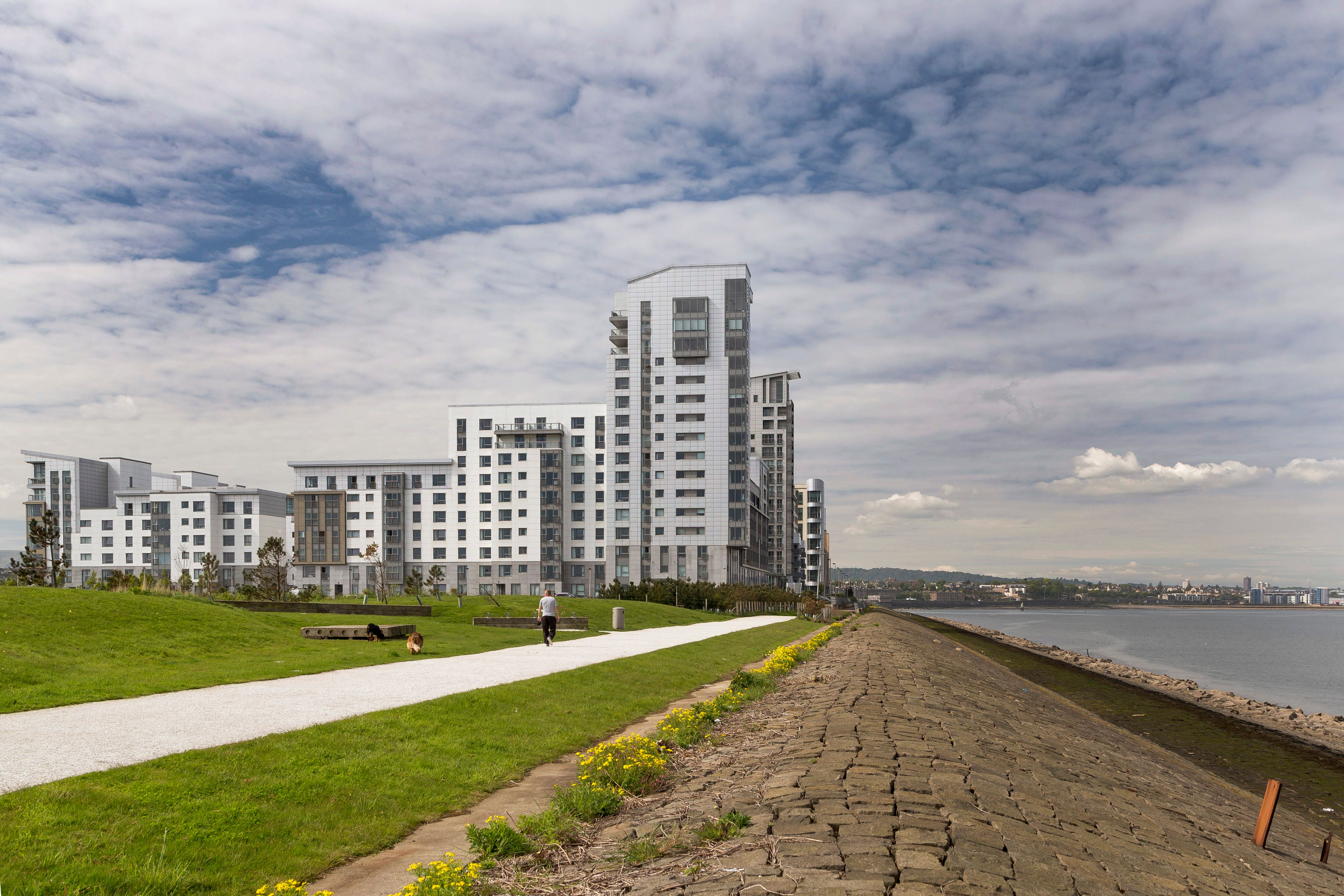
The Element building at Western Harbour

Initially, three large residential blocks were built along the western breakwater in 2009. However, interest in further development suddenly halted, largely as a result of the 2008 financial crisis and later the decision to cancel the Edinburgh Trams project to Leith and Newhaven.

Interest in Western Harbour has picked up again with the decision to complete the light rail link to Newhaven, which has since opened to passengers in June 2023. The Harbour Point & Gateway residential developments were completed in 2019 and the new replacement Victoria Primary and Nursery school opened its doors in January 2022. Another five development-ready sites went on the market in 2022 that would see up to 600 homes built on 10 acres of brownfield site.

== Transport ==
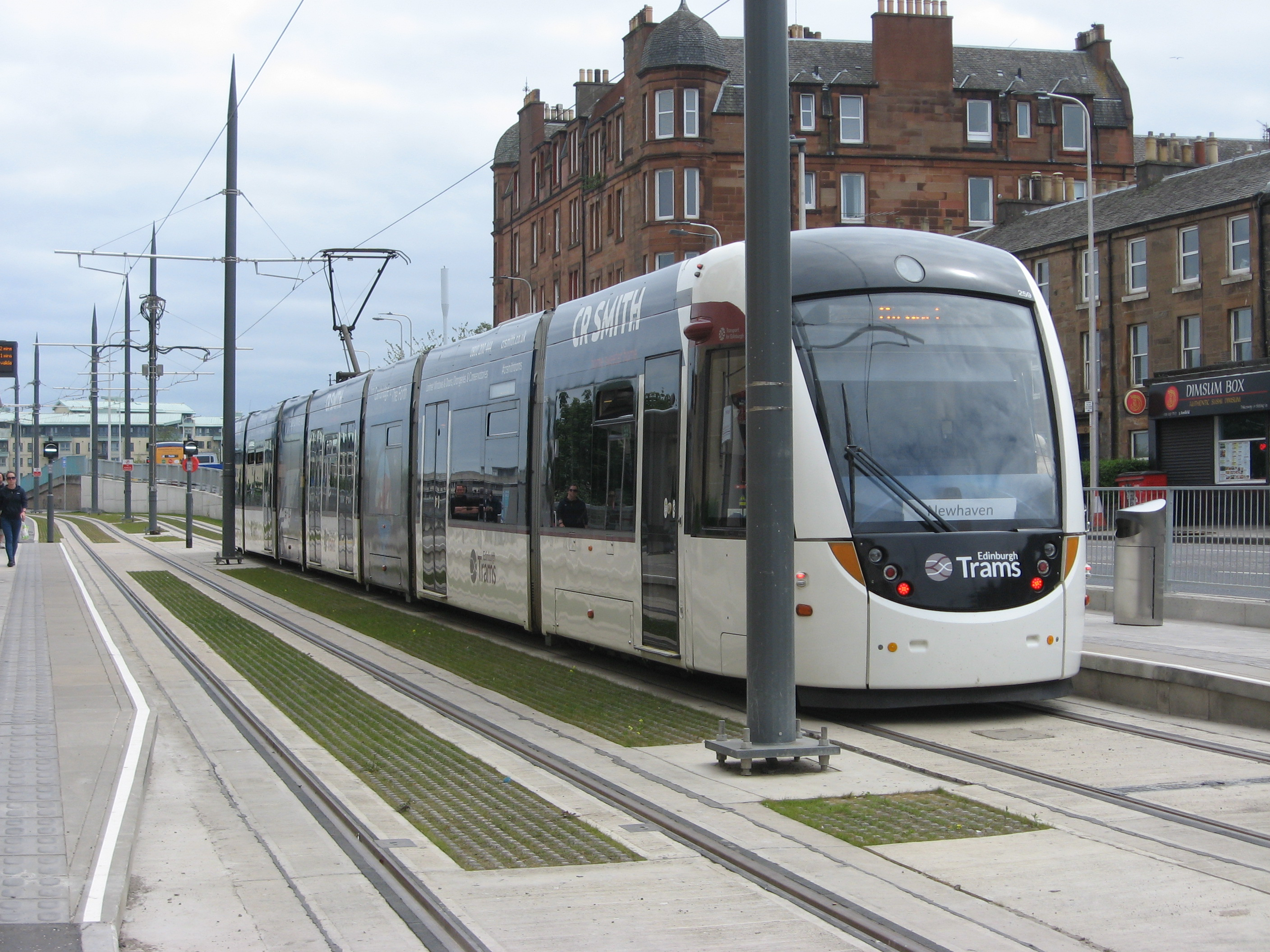
Tram arriving at the Newhaven terminus

=== Bus ===
Western Harbour has bus stops on Newhaven Place, Western Harbour Drive, Sandpiper Drive and Lindsay Road, all served by Lothian Buses service 11.

Services 16/N16 and the Skylink 200 also serve the Lindsay Road bus stop.

=== Tram ===
The area is served by Newhaven Tram Stop, located on the north side of Lindsay Road. This is the east terminus of the tram line.

Preceding station	Edinburgh Trams	Following station
Terminus	Newhaven – Edinburgh Airport	Ocean Terminal towards Airport

== Places of interest ==
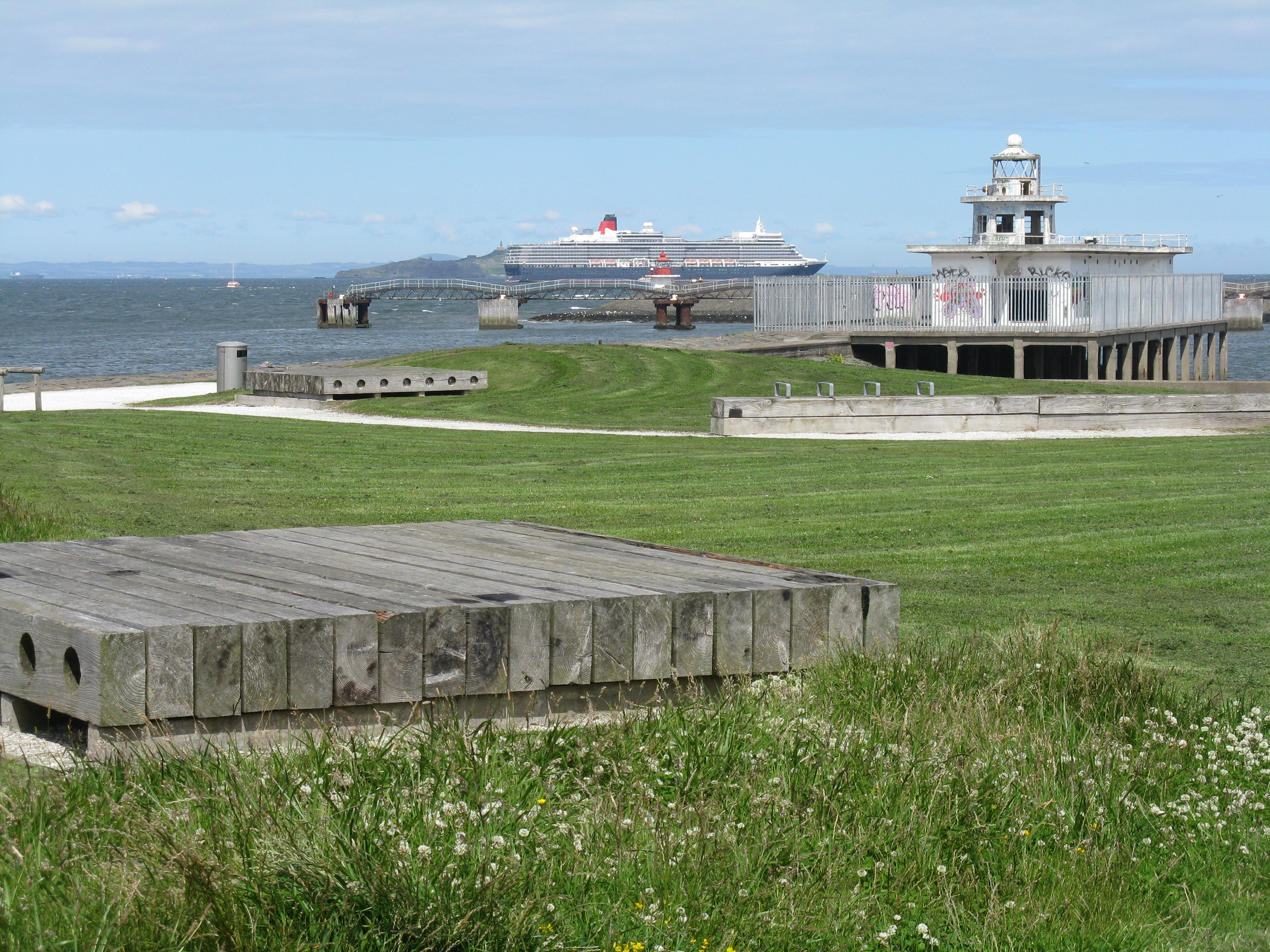
Lighthouse Park

=== West Breakwater Lighthouse ===
At the very northern tip of the breakwater sits an abandoned lighthouse built in the 1950s. It became known locally as the Point o' Leith. As navigational technology advanced it was eventually decommissioned. It has lay derelict for many years and has long been the target of heavy vandalism.

=== Lighthouse Park ===
A grass landscaped parkland at the north end of the western breakwater and south of the lighthouse, overlooking the dock gate. Some parts of the existing park may be temporary due to ongoing development in the area.

=== The Western Harbour Ponds ===
Since the development halted several years back, three ponds have formed within part of the excavated area. These have become home to several species of birds and other wildlife. A temporary tree preservation order has been issued for a collection of trees on the site.
