= Henry Robb =

Former Scottish shipbuilding company

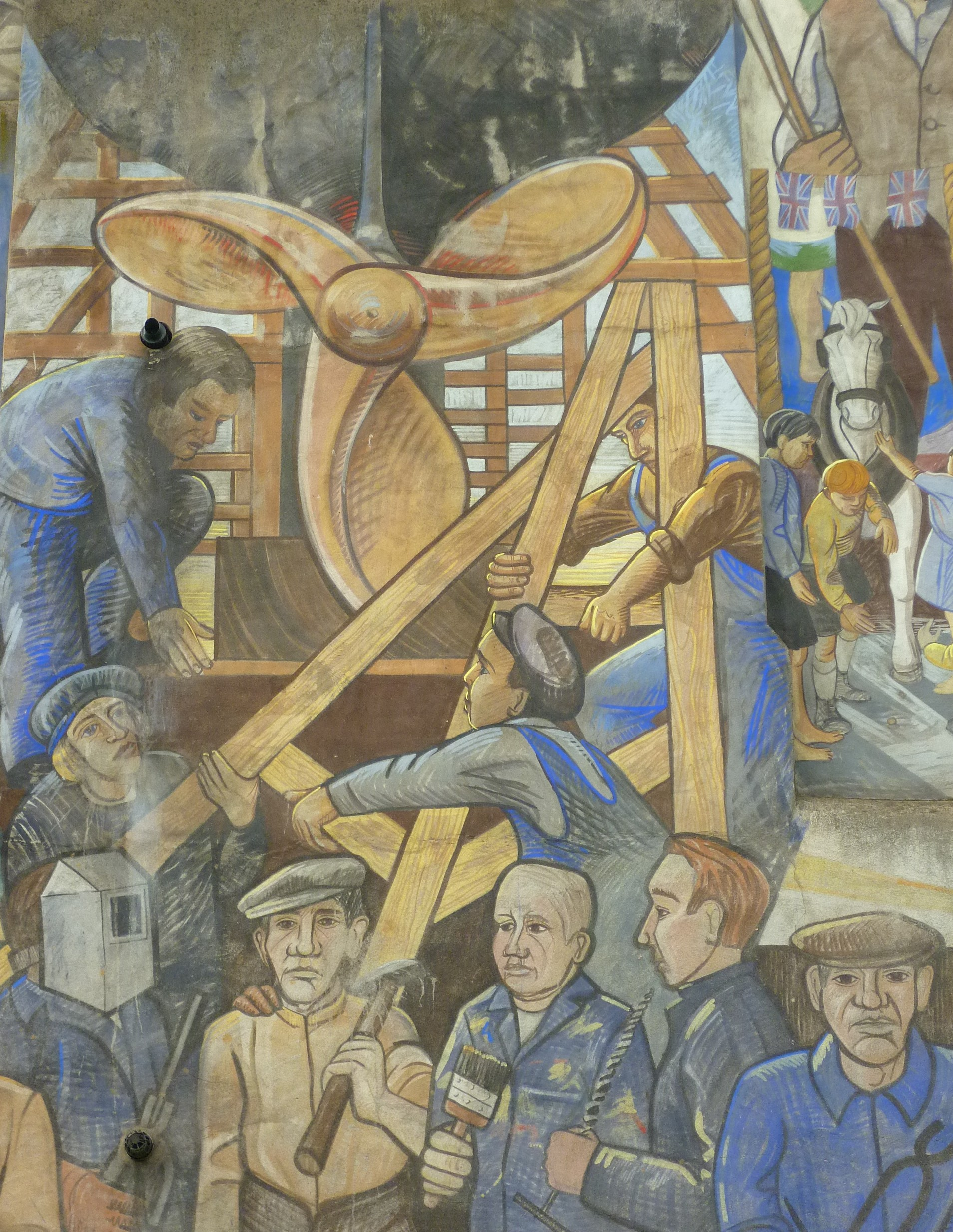
- Shipbuilding at Henry Robb's Yard, shown on the Leith Mural
- Type: Public
- Industry: Shipbuilding
- Founded: 1918
- Defunct: 1983
- Fate: Closed
- Headquarters: Leith, Edinburgh, Scotland
- Key people: Henry Robb

Henry Robb, Limited, known colloquially as Robbs, was a Scottish shipbuilding company based at Leith Docks in Edinburgh. Robbs built small-to-medium sized vessels, particularly tugs and dredgers.

== History ==
The company was founded on 1 April 1918 by Henry Robb, a former yard manager for Ramage & Ferguson shipbuilders, which lay around 1 km to the east. Robb was born in Partick, Glasgow in 1874 to Henry Robb (1843-1894), a ships caulker, and his wife Martha Simpson (1840–78). He married Mary Baird Mcintosh Cowan in 1903 and their son, Henry Cowan Robb (1932-2018), became a Director of the firm. Henry Robb died in Edinburgh in 1951.

Robbs grew by buying berths from Hawthorns in 1924, the business of Cran and Somerville in 1926 and the yards of Ramage and Ferguson in 1934. The site became known as Victoria Shipyard.

Robbs closed its Arbroath and Clyde operations in the 1920s and focused its activities on Leith.

During World War II, Robbs built a large number of warships for the Royal Navy, including preparing the designs and building the prototype of the Basset-class anti-submarine / minesweeping trawler. Three Bird-class corvettes were built for the Royal New Zealand Navy. Ordered in 1939, two of these ships famously sank the Japanese submarine I-1 in January 1943, while the third ship helped sink Japanese submarine I-17 seven months later.

On 26 February 1940 King George VI and Queen Elizabeth toured the shipyard. The King visited a second time on 29 July 1943.

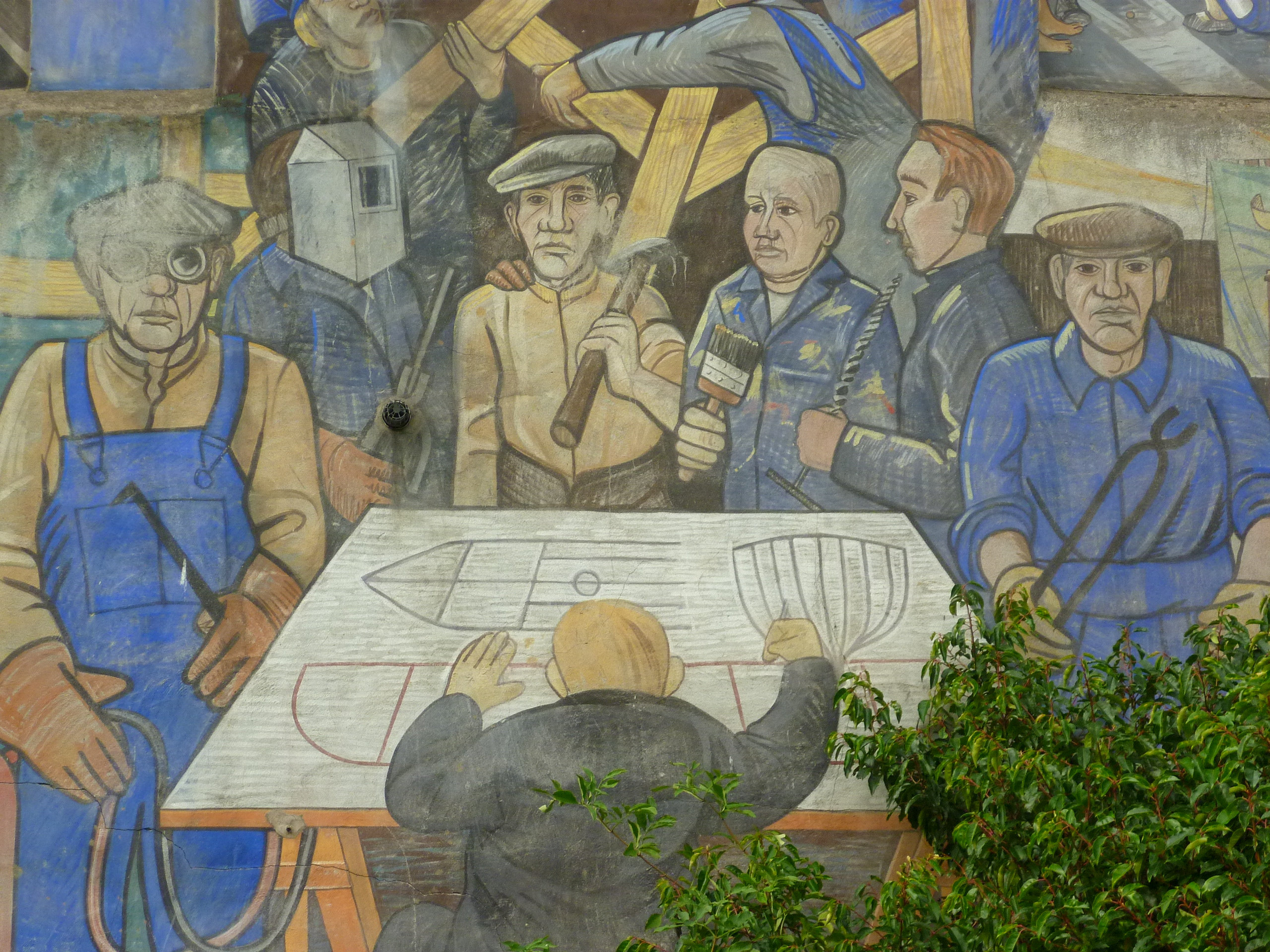
Workers at Henry Robb's, portrayed on the Leith Mural

In 1963 Robbs took over the neighbouring long-standing shipbuilding yard of Menzies & Co.

In 1968 Robbs merged with the Caledon Shipbuilding & Engineering Company of Dundee, forming Robb Caledon Shipbuilding, and in 1969 the new company took over the Burntisland Shipbuilding Company in Fife. In 1977, under the provisions of the Aircraft and Shipbuilding Industries Act 1977, Robb Caledon was nationalised as part of British Shipbuilders. The Caledon yard in Dundee closed in 1981. Robb's yard in Leith survived two more years, closing in 1983.

The site of Robb's shipyard is now the Ocean Terminal shopping centre, where the former Royal Yacht Britannia is berthed. An early 20th-century pitched roof paint shed that once belonged to the yard, built from rivetted iron plates, survives and was a Category B listed building before being relocated.

The yard features in the video to the song "Letter From America" (1987) by The Proclaimers, whose father worked in the yard. The overall sentiment of the song stresses the loss of Scotland's traditional industries and the mass emigration of Scots to North America due to circumstances such as the Highland Clearances.

== Ships built by Robbs ==
=== Naval ===
Flower-class corvettes

- HMS Delphinium
- HMS Dianthus
- HMS Petunia
- HMS Polyanthus
- HMS Lotus
- HMS Pink

Storage Ships

- MV Pembroke Coast
- MV British Coast
- MV Atlantic Coast
- MV Ocean Coast

Armed Trawlers

- HMS Basset
- HMS Mastiff

Hoppers

- MV Gallions Reach
- Tree-class trawlers
- HMS Hazel
- HMS Hickory

Castle-class corvettes

- HMS Flint Castle
- HMS Guildford Castle
- HMS Hedingham Castle

Bird-class minesweepers

- HMNZS Kiwi
- HMNZS Moa
- HMNZS Tui
- HMS Ringdove
- HMS Redstart

Other Minesweepers

- HMS Sword Dance
- HMS Staffa
- HMS Sidmouth
- HMS Stornoway

River-class frigates

- HMS Derg
- HMS Ness
- HMS Nith
- HMS Strule (ex- HMS Glenarm)
- HMS Windrush
- HMS Wye
- HMS Naver – cancelled and re-ordered as HMS Loch Achanalt.

Loch-class frigates

- HMS Loch Achanalt – to Royal Canadian Navy on completion.
- HMS Loch Insh – to Royal Malaysian Navy in 1964 as Hang Tuah.
- HMS Loch Katrine – to Royal New Zealand Navy in 1949 as Rotoiti.
- three further ships of this class – Loch Kishorn, Loch Nell and Loch Odairn – were cancelled.

Bay-class frigates

- HMS Cardigan Bay (ex- HMS Loch Laxford)
- HMS Carnarvon Bay (ex- HMS Loch Maddy)
- HMS Padstow Bay (ex- HMS Loch Coulside)

Royal Fleet Auxiliary ships

- RFA Bacchus – naval stores ship
- RFA Engadine – aviation training ship
- RFA Hebe – naval stores ship

Bustler-class ocean rescue tugs Built during WW2 these huge tugs could manage huge ships over long distances and were used to tow the sections of the Mulberry Harbour during the D-Day Landings

- HMRT Bustler
- HMRT Growler
- HMRT Hesperia
- HMRT Mediator
- HMRT Reward
- HMRT Samsonia
- HMRT Turmoil
- HMRT Warden

Other Tugs

- MV George Salt
- MV Firefly

Ships for Robertson Line

- MS Jacinth
- MS Spinel

Other Ships

- MS Kodara for Robetson Co.
- MS Edina for Currie Line
- MV Creole
- MV The Miller for E Marriage & Son
- MV Goldengown
- MV Puriri for Anchor Line of NZ
- MV Underwood for Union Steam Co of NZ
- MV Port Tauranga

Hecla-class survey vessel

- HMS Herald

Wild Duck-class RMAS cable-laying and salvage ships

- RMAS Goosander
- RMAS Pochard

=== Merchant ===
Yard No	Name	Type	Launch	Owner/Notes
216	Argos	cargo	1935	Cia. Argentina de Lanchas, Buenos Aires
267	South Steyne	Manly ferry	1 April 1938	Port Jackson & Manly Steamship Company
355	SS Tinto	cargo	1947	Ellerman's Wilson Line
356	SS Truro	cargo	1947	Ellerman's Wilson Line
357	SS Bravo	cargo	1947	Ellerman's Wilson Line
358	SS Silvio	cargo	1947	Ellerman's Wilson Line
361	MV Kaitangata	cargo	1948	Union Steamship Company
362	MV Konui	cargo	1949	Union Steamship Company
375	MV Kaitawa	collier	1949	Union Steamship Company
376	MV Kaiapoi	cargo	1949	Union Steamship Company
377	MV Kamona	cargo	1949	Union Steamship Company
379	MV Mombasa	passenger/cargo	1950	British India Steam Navigation Company
399	MV Kawatiri	cargo	1950	Union Steamship Company
393	MV Mtwara	passenger/cargo	1951	British India Steam Navigation Company
398	MV Waimate	cargo	1951	Union Steamship Company
400	MV Kokiri	cargo	1951	Union Steamship Company
406	MV Cavallo	cargo	1951	Ellerman's Wilson Line
407	MV Trentino	cargo	1952	Ellerman's Wilson Line
418	MV Wareatea	refrigerated cargo	1952	William Holyman and Sons Pty., Melbourne
427	MV Marwick Head	cargo	1952	A.F. Henry & MacGregor, Leith
426	MV Karamu	refrigerated cargo	1953	Union Steamship Company
428	MV Longfellow	cargo	1953	Rodney Steamship Company
430	MV Golden Bay	bulk carrier	1954	Tarakohe Shipping Co, Wellington
434	MV Auby	passenger/cargo	1954	Sarawak Steam Ship Company, Singapore
437	SS Cicero	refrigerated cargo	1954	Ellerman's Wilson Line
438	SS Rollo	refrigerated cargo	1954	Ellerman's Wilson Line
443	MV Kaitoa	cargo	1956	Union Steamship Company
448	MV Kaimai	cargo	1956	Union Steamship Company
456	MV Kumalla	cargo	1956	Union Steamship Company
457	MV Konini	cargo	1957	Union Steamship Company
508	RRS Bransfield	ice-strengthened research vessel	4 September 1970	British Antarctic Survey
515	MV Pioneer	ferry	4 January 1974	Caledonian MacBrayne
516	S.A. Wolraad Woltemade	salvage tug	15 May 1975	South African Marine Corporation
521	MV Borthwick	LPG Tanker	1977	Geo. Gibson & Co.
522	Claymore	ferry	31 August 1978	Caledonian MacBrayne
530	THV Patricia	lighthouse tender	1982	Trinity House
534	MV St Catherine	ferry	1983	Sealink/Wightlink
535	MV St Helen	ferry	1983	Sealink/Wightlink
