= K383 =

K383 or K-383 may refer to:

- K-383 (Kansas highway), a state highway in Kansas
- HMS Flint Castle (K383), a former UK Royal Navy ship
