= K137 =

K137 or K-137 may refer to:

- K-137 (Kansas highway), a state highway in Kansas
- HMS Pink (K137), a former UK Royal Navy ship
