= MV Fingal =

Lighthouse support ship converted to hotel

Coordinates: 55.9792°N 3.1691°W

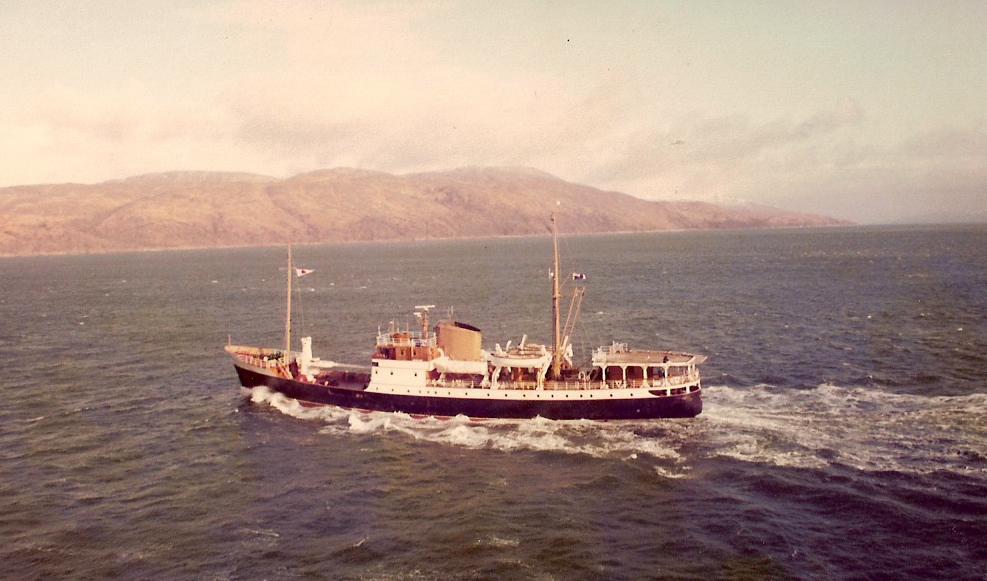
- MV Fingal sailing in the Hebrides

History

United Kingdom
- Name: Fingal
- Owner: Northern Lighthouse Board
- Port of registry: Leith
- Builder: Blythswood Shipbuilding Company, Glasgow
- Launched: 8 August 1963
- Identification: IMO 5419957
- Fate: Sold to Tamahine Investments in 2000
- Name: Windsor Castle
- Owner: Tamahine Investments
- Fate: Sold to the Royal Yacht Britannia Trust in 2014
- Name: Fingal
- Owner: The Royal Yacht Britannia Trust
- Operator: Royal Yacht Enterprises
- Status: in service as a luxury hotel

General characteristics
- Type: Twin screw motorship
- Tonnage: 1,342 GT
- Length: 238.9 ft (72.8 m)
- Beam: 40.3 ft (12.3 m)
- Depth: 18.5 ft (5.6 m)
- Propulsion: 2 x British Polar 2-stoke 6 cyl diesel engines

MV Fingal is a former Northern Lighthouse Board ship converted into a boutique hotel. Fingal is permanently berthed relatively near the former Royal Yacht Britannia as part of a major tourist attraction in Edinburgh, Scotland.

== History ==
Fingal was built by the Blythswood Shipbuilding Company in Glasgow, Scotland for the Northern Lighthouse Board. Launched in 1963, she was stationed for thirty years in Oban and then for six years in Stromness as a maintenance and supply vessel for lighthouses and buoys. The Fingal was retired from Northern Lighthouse Board service in the year 2000.

Following her retirement from the Northern Lighthouse Board, Fingal was sold to Hong Kong based Tamahine Investments, who renamed her Windsor Castle. The ship was maintained in working order for the next 14 years while moored on the River Fal in Cornwall.

In 2014, Windsor Castle was acquired by the Royal Yacht Britannia Trust who restored her original name.

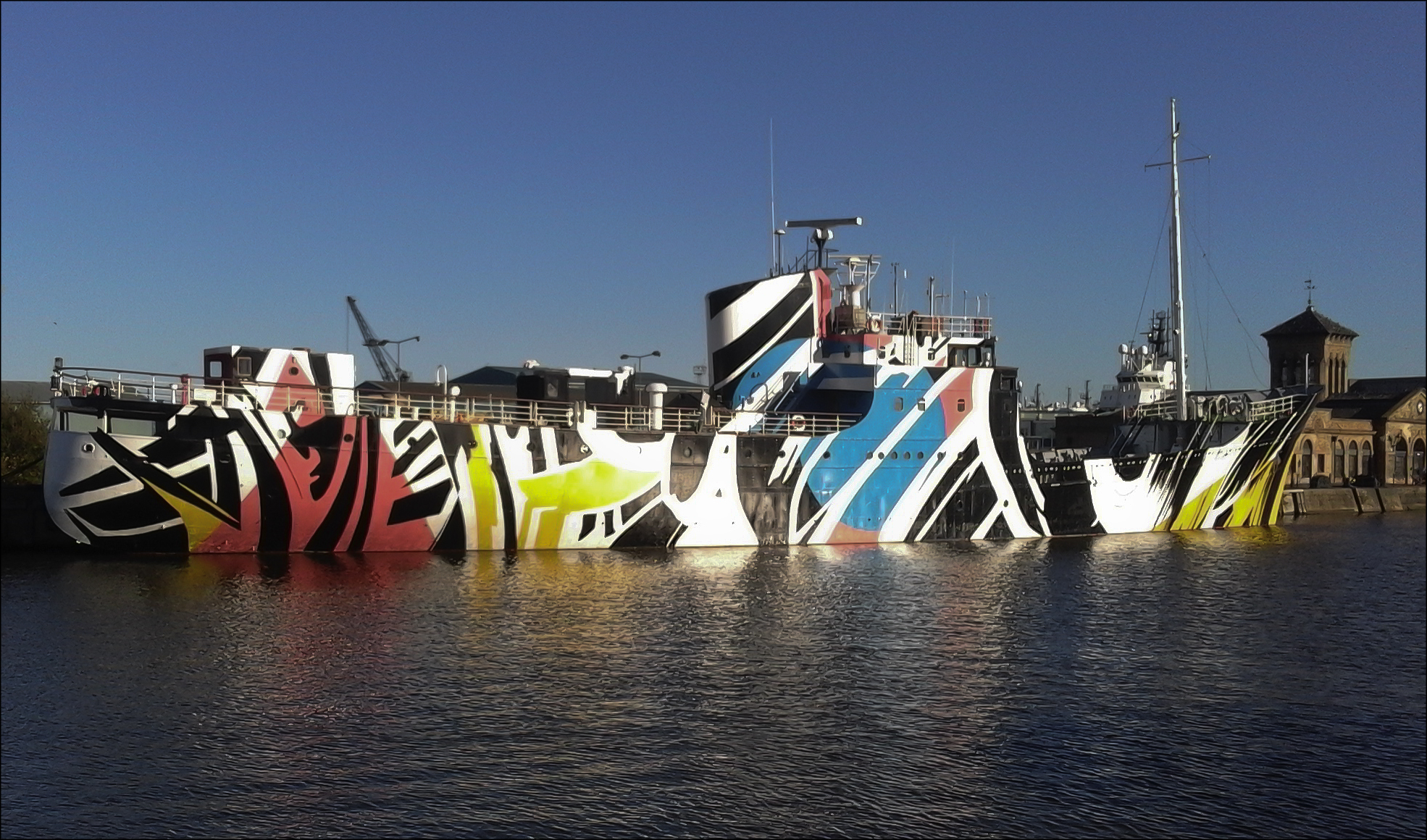
MV Fingal painted in a dazzle pattern, 2016

In 2016, Fingal was painted in a dazzle pattern named "Every Woman" designed by the artist Ciara Phillips as part of commemorations marking 100 years since the Battle of Jutland. The pattern used was a contemporary reimagining of dazzle camouflage specifically created to recognize the role of British women during World War I.

=== Luxury hotel ===
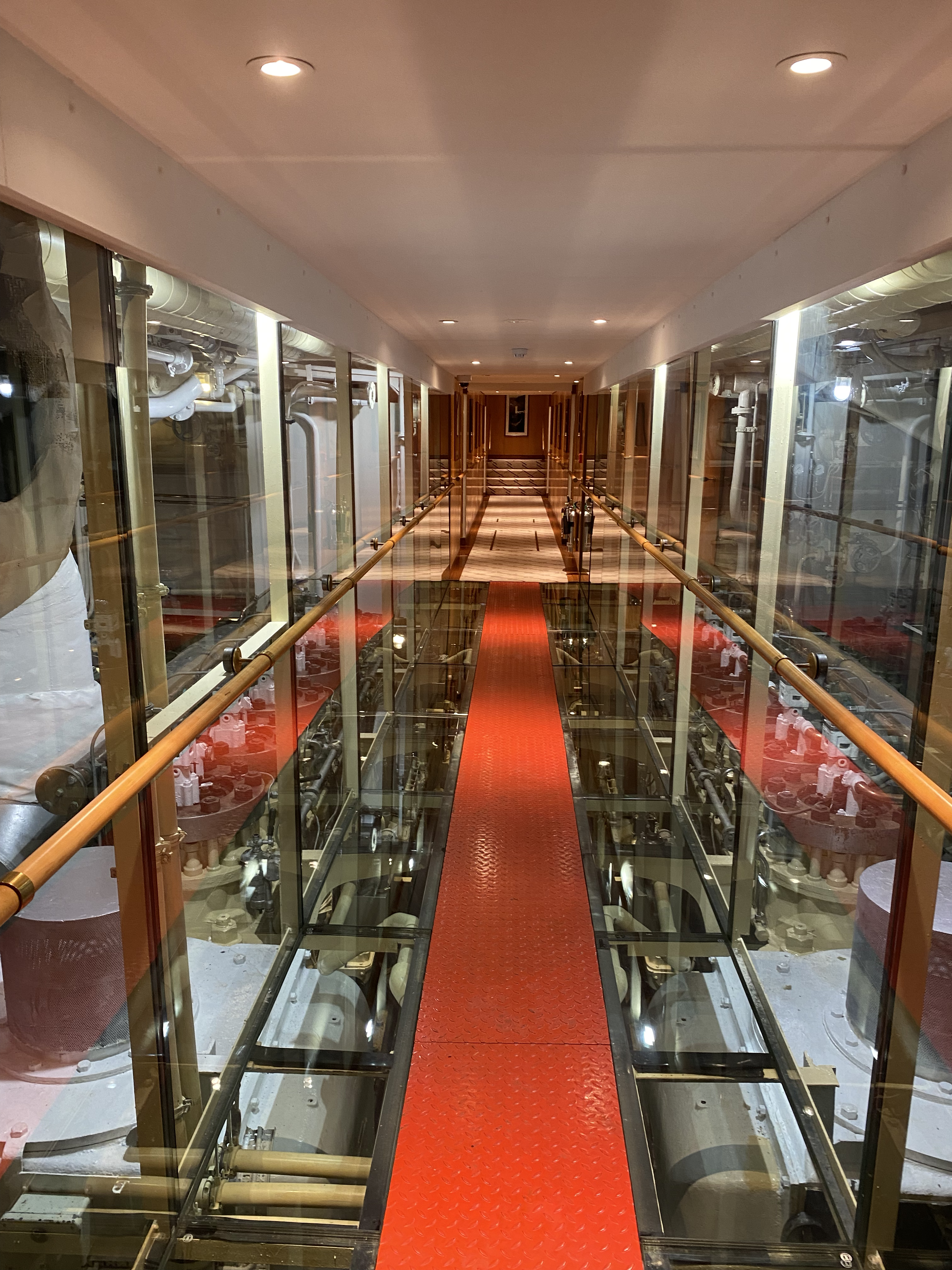
Fingal's engine room following the ships conversion into a luxury hotel

In 2019, following extensive modifications and refurbishment by the Pedley Group, Fingal was formally opened as a luxury floating hotel. It is berthed in the Alexandra Dock in the Port of Leith, about 600 m (2,000 ft) from the former Royal Yacht Britannia at Ocean Terminal, Edinburgh.

The hotel has 23 bedrooms, named after Northern Lighthouse Board lighthouses. Plans for the floating hotel were approved by the council by 6 votes to 5, following potential noise concerns.

In 2022 the AA awarded the Fingal its top five-star rating along with two AA Rosettes for its onboard restaurant, the Lighthouse. The AA praised the Lighthouse restaurant as "exceptional" and named the Fingal as one of the 25 best hotels in the United Kingdom.

== See also ==
- Northern Lighthouse Board
