= HMS Delphinium (K77) =

Flower-class corvette

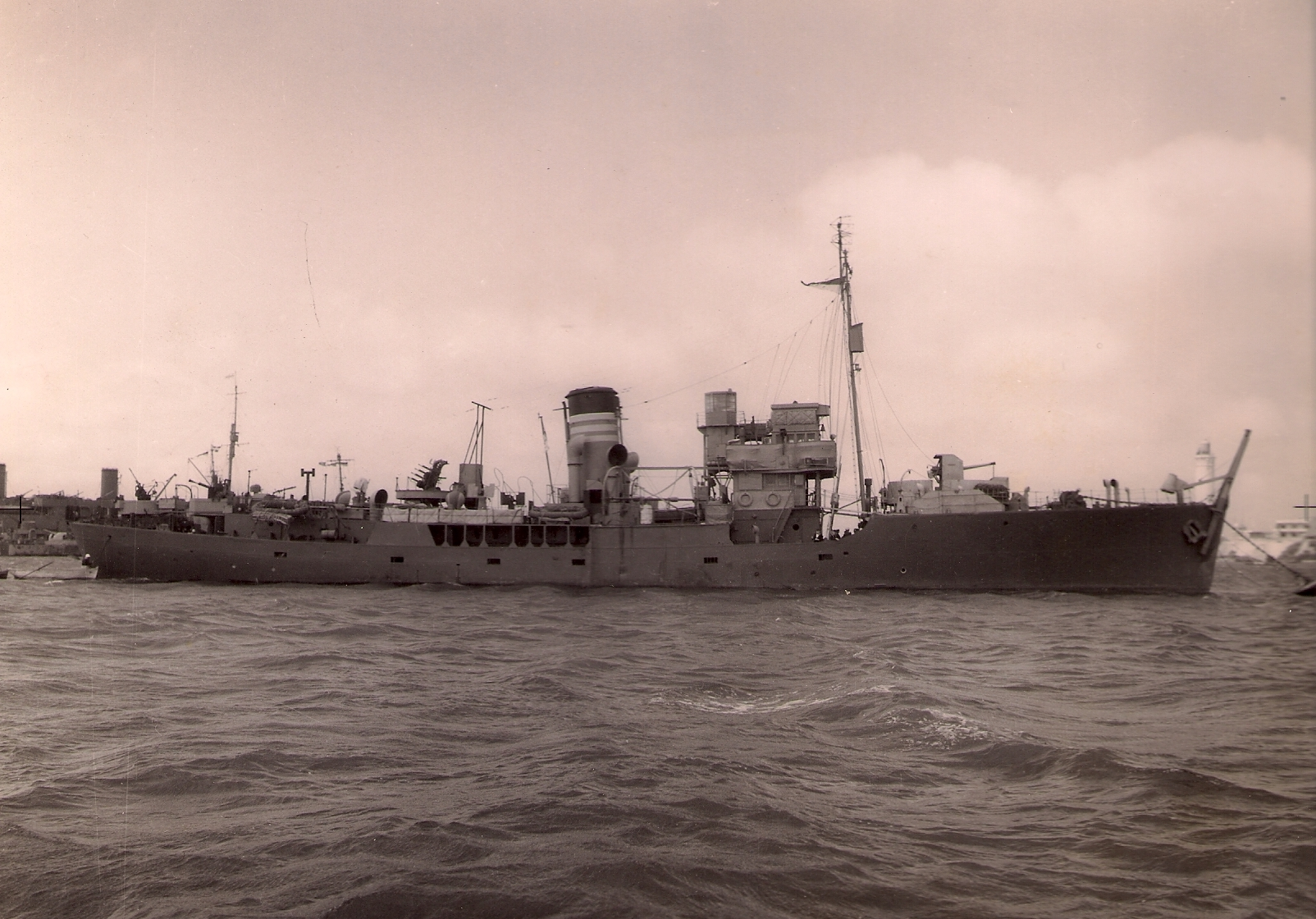
- HMS Delphinium (K77)

History

United Kingdom
- Name: Delphinium
- Builder: Henry Robb Ltd., Leith, United Kingdom
- Laid down: 31 October 1939
- Launched: 6 June 1940
- Commissioned: 15 November 1940
- Honours and awards: North Africa and Mediterranean 1941-1943, Sicily 1943, Atlantic 1943-1945
- Fate: Scrapped at Pembroke dock in 1949

General characteristics
- Class & type: Flower-class corvette
- Displacement: 940 tons
- Length: 205 ft (62.48 m)
- Beam: 33 ft (10.06 m)
- Draught: 11 ft 6 in (3.51 m)
- Propulsion: Single shaft 2 × fire tube Scotch boilers; 2 screws; 1 × 4-cycle triple-expansion reciprocating steam engine; 2,750 ihp (2,050 kW)
- Speed: 16 knots (29.6 km/h)
- Range: 3,500 nmi (6,482 km) @ 12 kt
- Complement: 85
- Sensors & processing systems: 1 × SW1C or 2C radar, 1× Type 123A or Type 127DV sonar
- Armament: 1 × 4 inch BL Mk.IX single gun, 2 × Vickers .50 machine guns (twin), 2 × .303 inch Lewis machine gun (twin), 2 × Mk.II depth charge throwers, 2 × depth charge rails with 40 depth charges, originally fitted with minesweeping and acoustic mine gear, later removed.

HMS Delphinium (K77) was a Flower-class corvette built for the Royal Navy (RN) from 1940 to 1946. From 1941 to 1943 she was active in the Mediterranean as an escort to convoys supporting the Eighth Army and the invasion of Sicily. From mid-1943 onwards she was on convoy escort duties between Africa, the Mediterranean and the United Kingdom; and Atlantic convoys between North America and the United Kingdom. She escorted a total of 68 convoys.

== Design and construction ==
The early Flower class corvettes, such as Delphinium were 205 feet 0 inches (62.48 m) long overall, 196 feet 0 inches (59.74 m) at the waterline and 190 feet 0 inches (57.91 m) between perpendiculars. Beam was 33 feet 0 inches (10.06 m) and draught was 14 feet 10 inches (4.52 m) aft. Displacement was about 940 long tons (960 t) standard and 1,170 long tons (1,190 t) full load. Two Admiralty Three-drum water tube boilers fed steam to a Vertical Triple Expansion Engine rated at 2,750 indicated horsepower (2,050 kW) which drove a single propeller shaft. This gave a speed of 16 knots (18 mph; 30 km/h). 200 tons of oil were carried, giving a range of 4,000 nautical miles (4,600 mi; 7,400 km) at 12 knots (14 mph; 22 km/h).

Design armament was a single BL 4-inch Mk IX naval gun forward and a single 2-pounder "pom-pom" anti-aircraft cannon aft, although the pom-poms were not available until 1941, so early Flowers such as Delphinium were completed with improvised close-range anti aircraft armament such as Lewis guns or Vickers .50 machine guns instead.

Delphinium was one of the first group of Flower-class corvettes modified for magnetic minesweeping In February 1941, they were also fitted with SA Type A Mark II gear (a submersible A-frame and bucket) to detonate acoustic mines. Delphinium retained anti-submarine capacity, although there was a reduction in the number of depth charges carried.

Delphinium formed part of the initial 26-ship order for Flower-class corvettes placed on 25 July 1939 under the 1939/40 Naval estimates. She was laid down at Henry Robb's, Leith shipyard on 31 October 1939, was launched on 6 June 1940 and commissioned on 15 November 1940.

== Service history ==
In February 1942, Delphinium was adopted by Torrington and District, Devon, as part of a warship week National Savings Campaign. Between 1941 and 1945, Delphinium escorted a total of 68 convoys.

After commissioning, Delphinium escorted four Atlantic Convoys in January 1941. In February 1941 she joined convoy OG 53 as an escort during passage to Gibraltar. In December 1941, Delphinium was part of the 11th corvette group based in Alexandria.

Between March and June 1942, she escorted 11 convoys between Tobruk and Alexandria supplying the Eighth Army in North Africa.

In January 1942 (escorting convoy AT-16), Delphinium (along with Primula) ran aground in Great Pass Alexandria. She was refloated with minor damage. On 20 May 1942, the German Submarine U-431 spotted convoy AT-46 about 65 miles east of Tobruk and torpedoed Eocene. Delphinium and the other convoy escorts (Hero and HMS Falk) dropped depth charges over the suspected position of the U-431, however it remained undetected and managed to escape.

In June 1942, Delphinium took part in Operation Vigorous, escorting supply convoy MW11 from the eastern Mediterranean to supply Malta.

Between June 1942 and July 1943, Delphinium did not escort any major convoys and in September 1942, was organised as the lead of the 3rd Escort Group assigned to vessels sailing between Port Said and Alexandria. The other vessels in this group were HMS Gloxinia, the Royal Hellenic Navy destroyers Kountouriotis and Spetsai, HMSAS Protea, HMSAS Southern Seas, the minesweeping trawlers HMT Cumbrae and HMT Islay, and the anti-submarine whaler HMS Klo.

On 11 February 1943, the Dutch tanker Saroena was torpedoed by German submarine U-81, and caught fire. Saroena was run aground in the St. George Bay, near Beirut and Delphinium assisted in the salvage operation.

In July 1943, Delphinium returned to convoy escort duty as part of the Allied invasion of Sicily (convoy KMS 019a), escorting a convoy of tankers sent to re-supply the invasion fleet.

In November 1943, Delphinium was made part of the 47th Escort Group, together with the Royal Hellenic Navy corvettes Sachtouris and Apostolis, HMS Inver (K302), HMSAS Southern Seas and a vessel from the 19th Minesweeping Flotilla.

From August 1943 to May 1945, Delphinium escorted 14 convoys sailing between the Port Said and Chesapeake Bay (GUS/UGS), 20 Atlantic convoys between the Mediterranean and Liverpool (MKS/KMS), and a further 15 convoys variously between United Kingdom and Sierra Leone (OS) as well as within the United Kingdom (TBC/BTC).

=== Fate ===
Delphinium was scrapped at Pembroke Dock in February 1949.

== Sources ==
- Elliott, Peter (1977). Allied Escort Ships of World War II: A complete survey. London: Macdonald and Jane's Publishers. ISBN 0-356-08401-9.
- Friedman, Norman (2008). British Destroyers and Frigates: The Second World War and After. Barnsley, UK: Seaforth Publishing. ISBN 978-1-84832-015-4.
- Lambert, John; Brown, Les (2008). Flower-Class Corvettes. St. Catharines, Ontario, Canada: Vanwall Publishing. ISBN 978-1-55068-986-0.
- Rohwer, Jürgen; Hümmelchen, Gerhard (1992). Chronology of the War at Sea 1939–1945. London: Greenhill Books. ISBN 1-85367-117-7.
