= Leith Races =

Historic horse race in Edinburgh, Scotland

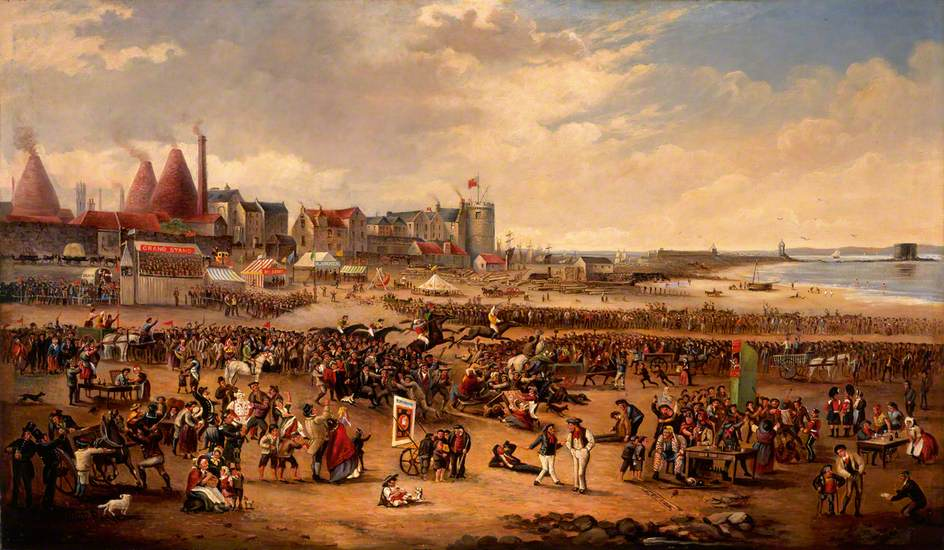
Painting of the annual races in Leith, Edinburgh, Scotland

Leith Races were the most important horse racing event in Scotland in the eighteenth century. They took place on the sands to the east of the harbour at Leith, near Edinburgh from 1504 (or earlier) to 1816. They first gained popularity through the patronage of the Duke of Albany, the future James VII and II, while he was Royal Commissioner at the Palace of Holyrood. Their exact date of origin had been lost by the mid-19th century but there is reference in the accounts of James IV's personal expenditure to a payment made in 1504 to a jockey, "the boy that ran the King’s horse", at Leith. There is also reference to them in the memoirs of the Earl of Huntly in 1591. From the Restoration until 1816, the races took place annually with very little intermission.

Leith Races were Edinburgh's great working class festival of the year and business was often suspended for the duration. They took place in the last week of July or the first week of August, and lasted for four or five days. The races were accompanied by a fair and other celebrations, the sands being covered with tents, booths and sideshows, including "roley-poleys, hobby-horses, wheels-of-fortune and many ... strange characters" Crowds could get drunken and rowdy and often brawls broke out, sometimes "along the whole length of Leith Walk".

The large crowds that attended included landowners from around the country. This made Leith an exception among race meetings in Scotland at the time, since during the eighteenth century most leading landlords looked to London for their social activity. Aristocratic patrons included the Duke of Buccleuch, Duke of Hamilton and Earl of Eglinton. The races were also supported by the city magistrates, who for many years opened the races by processing from the council chambers down Leith Walk to Leith with the "City Purse" being held aloft on a pole.

The biggest race was the Royal Plate, run for from at least 1728 by 6 year olds, carrying 12 stone, in 4 mile heats. Horses racing at Leith were not regarded as being especially noteworthy though, so records are scarce. In 1752, the Plate was opened up to all horse 4 years old and over, and in 1756, 1757, 1758 and 1760, the Royal Plate was divided into two plates, 50 guineas each.

The races were not held between 1741 and 1748, and their real popularity began in the latter half of the century. By 1800, it was said there had never been a better meeting, and the One Hundred Guineas race "attracted a great deal of company, far beyond what any person remembers."

In 1816, the races were moved permanently to Musselburgh to the east. The soft sands of Leith were now deemed unsuitable for the horses, in contrast to the turf at Musselburgh. After their removal, the races became a more sedate affair, Leith Races having been known to take place "amid a jollity unknown now at the other locality to which they have been transferred". Abortive attempts were made to revive racing in Leith in 1839 and 1840 and even into the 1850s Leith Races were still remembered with affection by elderly residents of Edinburgh.

Areas of the sandy foreshore used for the races were later reclaimed as part of the expansion of the Port of Leith.

The gold teapot awarded as the King's prize at Leith is now on display in the National Museum of Scotland, and was the subject of a poem in the museum's 26 Treasures exhibition in 2011.

Robert Fergusson, on Leith Races:

"To town-guard Drum, of clangour clear,

Baith men and steeds are raingit;

Some liveries red or yellow wear,

And some are tartan spraingit!"

== Bibliography ==
- Barrett, Norman, ed. (1995). The Daily Telegraph Chronicle of Horse Racing. Enfield, Middlesex: Guinness Publishing.
- Burnett, John (1998). "The Sites and Landscapes of Horse Racing in Scotland Before 1860" (PDF). The Sports Historian. 18 (1). The British Society of Sports History: 55–75. doi:10.1080/17460269809444769. Archived from the original (PDF) on 28 April 2014.
- Grant, James (1880). Cassell's Old and New Edinburgh: Its History, its People and its Places. Vol. VI. London, Paris and New York: Cassell, Petter, Galpin & Co.
- Whyte, James Christie (1840). History of the British Turf, from the earliest period to the present day, Volume I. London: H. Colburn. OL 6544990M.
