= RFA Bacchus =

Three ships of the Royal Fleet Auxiliary have borne the name RFA Bacchus, after Bacchus, the god of wine in Roman mythology:

- RFA Bacchus (1915) was a store carrier launched in 1915. She was renamed RFA Bacchus II in 1936 and was sunk as a target in 1938.
- RFA Bacchus (A103) was a store carrier launched in 1936 and sold into civilian service in 1962 under the name Pulau Bali.
- RFA Bacchus (A404) was a store carrier launched in 1962 and returned to her owners in 1981 under the name Cherry Lanka.
