= RMAS Goosander =

History

United Kingdom
- Name: RMAS Goosander (A164)
- Builder: Robb Caledon Shipbuilders
- Launched: 1973
- Identification: IMO number: 4500084

General characteristics
- Class & type: Wild Duck-class salvage vessel
- Displacement: 900 Gross Tons
- Length: 58 m
- Beam: 12 m
- Draught: 4 m
- Complement: 58

RMAS Goosander (A164) was a mooring, salvage and boom vessel of the Royal Maritime Auxiliary Service. She saw service in the Falklands War. She has a sister ship, RMAS Pochard, and was built by Robb Caledon Shipbuilders in Leith.
