= HMS Carnarvon Bay =

1945 Bay-class anti-aircraft frigate of the Royal Navy

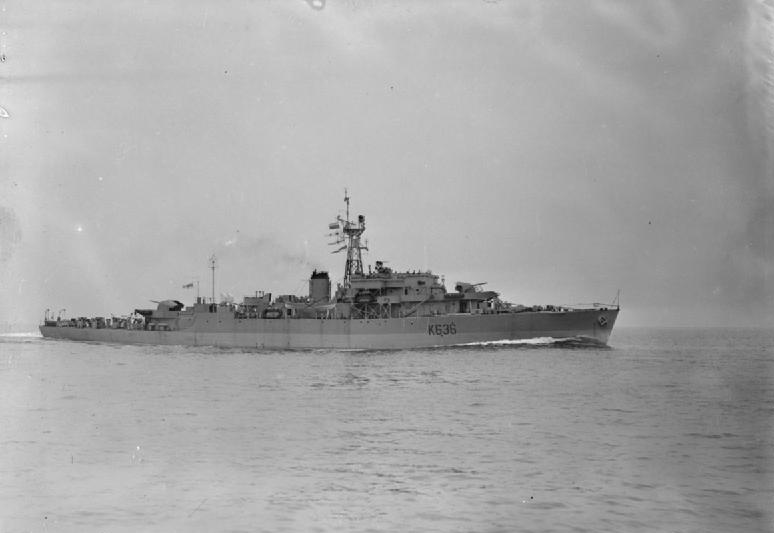
- Carnarvon Bay in September 1945

History

United Kingdom
- Name: HMS Carnarvon Bay
- Namesake: Caernarfon Bay
- Ordered: 25 January 1943
- Builder: Henry Robb, Leith
- Laid down: 8 June 1944
- Launched: 15 March 1945
- Completed: 20 September 1945
- Commissioned: September 1945
- Decommissioned: May 1946
- Identification: Pennant number K636
- Fate: Sold for scrapping, 1959

General characteristics
- Class & type: Bay-class frigate
- Displacement: 1,600 long tons (1,626 t) standard; 2,530 long tons (2,571 t) full
- Length: 307 ft (94 m) o/a
- Beam: 38 ft 7 in (11.76 m)
- Draught: 12 ft 9 in (3.89 m)
- Installed power: 5,500 ihp (4,100 kW); 2 × Admiralty 3-drum boilers
- Propulsion: 2 shafts; 2 vertical triple-expansion steam engines
- Speed: 20 knots (37 km/h; 23 mph)
- Range: 9,500 nmi (17,600 km; 10,900 mi) at 12 knots (22 km/h; 14 mph)
- Complement: 157
- Sensors & processing systems: Type 285 fire control radar; Type 291 air warning radar; Type 276 target indication radar; High Frequency Direction Finder (HF/DF); IFF transponder
- Armament: 2 × twin QF 4-inch Mark XVI dual-purpose guns; 2 × twin 40 mm Bofors AA guns; 4 × twin 20 mm Oerlikon AA guns; 1 × 24-barrel Hedgehog A/S projector; 2 rails and 4 throwers for 50 depth charges

HMS Carnarvon Bay was a Bay-class anti-aircraft frigate built for the Royal Navy during World War 2.

== Design and description ==
The Bay-class frigates were anti-aircraft versions of the Loch-class anti-submarine frigates intended for service in the Far East. Carnarvon Bay displaced 1,600 long tons (1,600 t) at standard load and 2,420 long tons (2,460 t) at deep load. The ship had an overall length of 307 feet (93.6 m), a beam of 38 feet 7 inches (11.8 m) and a draught of 12 feet 9 inches (3.9 m). She was powered by two vertical triple-expansion steam engines, each driving one shaft, using steam provided by two Admiralty three-drum boilers. The engines produced a total of 5,500 shaft horsepower (4,100 kW) and gave a maximum speed of 20 knots (37 km/h; 23 mph). Carnarvon Bay carried a maximum of 724 long tons (736 t) of fuel oil that gave her a range of 9,500 nautical miles (17,600 km; 10,900 mi) at 12 knots (22 km/h; 14 mph). The ship's complement was 157 officers and ratings.

The ships were armed with four QF 4-inch Mark XVI dual-purpose guns in two twin mounts forward of the superstructure. Supplementing their anti-aircraft (AA) defence, they had two twin mounts for 40 mm Bofors and two twin mounts for Oerlikon 20 mm cannon AA guns. Some ships had their Oerlikons replaced by two single Bofors guns. She was fitted with a 24-barrel Hedgehog spigot mortar. Two depth charge rails and four throwers were fitted for 50–60 depth charges.

== Construction and career ==
HMS Carnarvon Bay, named after Caernarfon Bay (anglicised as 'Carnarvon Bay') in Gwynedd, Wales, was originally ordered as the Loch-class vessel Loch Maddy, but the order was changed in 1944. Built by Henry Robb of Leith, the ship was laid down on 8 June 1944 and launched on 15 March 1945 by Lady Westwood.

== Service history ==
After sea trials Carnarvon Bay was assigned to the Rosyth Flotilla, joining in November 1945. Deployed for training duties, she made a single voyage to Oslo in January 1946, and to Scapa Flow in February. In April she sailed to Harwich to be decommissioned. Laid-up in the Reserve Fleet at Harwich, she was used as an accommodation ship for personnel of the Reserve Fleet.

Carnarvon Bay remained at Harwich until being sold on 28 August 1959.

== Bibliography ==
- Chesneau, Roger, ed. (1980). Conway's All the World's Fighting Ships 1922–1946. Greenwich, UK: Conway Maritime Press. ISBN 0-85177-146-7.
- Colledge, J. J.; Warlow, Ben (2006) [1969]. Ships of the Royal Navy: The Complete Record of All Fighting Ships of the Royal Navy from the 15th Century to the Present (3rd Rev ed.). London: Chatham Publishing. ISBN 978-1-86176-281-8. OCLC 67375475.
- Friedman, Norman (2006). British Destroyers and Frigates, the Second World War and After. Annapolis, Maryland: Naval Institute Press. ISBN 1-86176-137-6.
- Lenton, H. T. (1998). British & Empire Warships of the Second World War. Annapolis, Maryland: Naval Institute Press. ISBN 1-55750-048-7.
