= RFA Bacchus (A404) =

1962 Hebe-class stores freighter of the Royal Fleet Auxiliary

- RFA Bacchus

History

United Kingdom
- Name: RFA Bacchus
- Namesake: Bacchus
- Builder: Henry Robb, Leith
- Laid down: 18 April 1961
- Launched: 4 June 1962
- In service: 8 November 1962
- Out of service: 8 September 1981
- Identification: IMO number: 5033454; Pennant number: A404
- Fate: Scrapped 1985

General characteristics
- Tonnage: 4,823 gross register tons (GRT)
- Displacement: 2,740 long tons (2,780 t) (light), 7,958 long tons (8,086 t) (full load)
- Length: 350 feet (110 m) pp, 350 feet (110 m) overall
- Beam: 55 feet (17 m)
- Draught: 22 feet (6.7 m) max
- Propulsion: Swan Hunter-Sulzer SRD68 5-cylinder diesel engine on one shaft, 5,500 bhp (4,101 kW)
- Speed: 15 knots (28 km/h; 17 mph)
- Range: 720 tons fuel oil
- Complement: 57

RFA Bacchus (A404) was a stores ship of the Royal Fleet Auxiliary (RFA), the naval auxiliary fleet of the United Kingdom. She was the third ship to bear this name.

Built by Henry Robb of Leith for the British-India Steam Navigation Company and operated by the RFA on a long-term bareboat charter. She was designed to carry naval stores from UK to overseas naval bases, she pioneered containerisation with "Chacons", small wooden containers developed at Chatham Dockyard.

Bacchus was returned to her owners on 1 October 1981, and renamed Cherry Lanka on 6 November 1981. She scrapped at Gadani Beach on 31 December 1985.

Her sister-ship, RFA Hebe (A406) caught fire and was a constructive total loss in 1978 in Gibraltar.
