= HMS Flint Castle =

British castle-class corvettes

- Flint Castle

History

United Kingdom
- Name: Flint Castle
- Namesake: Flint Castle
- Ordered: 19 January 1943
- Builder: Henry Robb, Leith, Scotland
- Laid down: 20 April 1943
- Launched: 1 September 1943
- Completed: 31 December 1943
- Out of service: March 1956
- Identification: Pennant number: K383
- Honours and awards: Atlantic 1944–45
- Fate: Sold for scrap, 1956

General characteristics (as built)
- Class & type: Castle-class corvette
- Displacement: 1,010 long tons (1,030 t) (standard)
- Length: 252 ft (76.8 m)
- Beam: 33 ft (10.1 m)
- Draught: 13 ft 9 in (4.2 m) (deep load)
- Installed power: 2 Admiralty 3-drum boilers; 2,880 ihp (2,150 kW)
- Propulsion: 1 shaft, 1 triple-expansion engine
- Speed: 16.5 knots (30.6 km/h; 19.0 mph)
- Range: 6,500 nmi (12,000 km; 7,500 mi) at 15 knots (28 km/h; 17 mph)
- Complement: 99
- Sensors & processing systems: Type 145 and Type 147 ASDIC; Type 272 search radar; HF/DF radio direction finder
- Armament: 1 × QF 4 in (102 mm) DP gun; 2 × twin, 2 × single 20 mm (0.8 in) AA guns; 1 × 3-barrel Squid anti-submarine mortar; 1 × depth charge rail and 2 throwers; 15 depth charges

HMS Flint Castle (K383) was one of 44 Castle-class corvettes built for the Royal Navy during World War II. Completed at the end of 1943, the ship ran aground while training in January 1944. After repairs were completed the following month, she was briefly assigned to the 39th Escort Group for convoy escort duties in the Atlantic Ocean. Flint Castle was transferred to Escort Group B2 in March and screened convoys to and from Gibraltar until September. That month, she joined Escort Group B3 to escort convoys between Canada and Britain and continued to do so until the end of the war in May 1945. The ship then became an anti-submarine training ship in Rosyth and Campbeltown, Scotland, before moving to Portland at the beginning of 1947. Flint Castle remained there until she was taken out of service in March 1956 and broken up beginning in July 1958.

== Design and description ==
The Castle-class corvette was a stretched version of the preceding Flower class, enlarged to improve seakeeping and to accommodate modern weapons. The ships displaced 1,010 long tons (1,030 t) at standard load and 1,510 long tons (1,530 t) at deep load. The ships had an overall length of 252 feet (76.8 m), a beam of 36 feet 9 inches (11.2 m) and a deep draught of 13 feet 9 inches (4.2 m). They were powered by a four-cylinder triple-expansion steam engine driving one propeller shaft using steam provided by two Admiralty three-drum boilers. The engine developed a total of 2,880 indicated horsepower (2,150 kW) and gave a speed of 16.5 knots (30.6 km/h; 19.0 mph). The Castles carried fuel oil that gave them a range of 6,500 nautical miles (12,000 km; 7,500 mi) at 15 knots (28 km/h; 17 mph). The ships' complement was 99 officers and ratings.

The Castle-class ships were equipped with a single QF 4-inch (102 mm) Mk XVI dual-purpose gun forward, but their primary weapon was their single three-barrel Squid anti-submarine mortar. This was backed up by one depth charge rail and two throwers for 15 depth charges. The ships were fitted with two twin and a pair of single mounts for 20-millimeter (0.8 in) Oerlikon AA guns. Provision was made for a further four single mounts if needed. They were equipped with Type 145Q and Type 147B ASDIC sets to detect submarines by reflections from sound waves beamed into the water. A Type 272 search radar and a HF/DF radio direction finder rounded out the Castles' sensor suite.

== Construction and career ==
Flint Castle, the only ship of her name to serve in the Royal Navy, was ordered on 19 January 1943 and laid down by Henry Robb at their shipyard in Leith, Scotland on 20 April. The ship was launched on 1 September and completed on 31 December. She was damaged by an accidental explosion alongside Barrage Vessel BV 42 on 22 December 1943 and one man killed on each vessel. BV 42 sank.

She arrived at Tobermory, Mull, Scotland, on 12 January 1944 to begin training at the Royal Navy's Anti-Submarine Training School, HMS Western Isles. Flint Castle ran aground while training on 18 January and was refloated. She arrived at Belfast, Northern Ireland, the following day to begin repairs that lasted until 9 February. The ship was then assigned to the 39th Escort Group and escorted one Atlantic convoy in mid-March before being transferred to the Liverpool-based Escort Group B2 to escort convoys to and from Gibraltar. In September 1944, Flint Castle was assigned to Escort Group B3, which protected convoys sailing between St. John's, Newfoundland and Labrador, Canada, and Britain. The ship was refitted in Cardiff, Wales, in January–March 1945 and rejoined her group in Liverpool in April.

She was assigned to Rosyth Command in June as an anti-submarine training ship and visited ports in Norway and Germany over the next several months. Flint Castle was transferred to the Rosyth Escort Force in June 1946, which was employed as a training unit; it was redesignated as the Basic Anti-Submarine Training Flotilla in September. The unit was then transferred to Portland and used a variety of names before settling on the Second Training Squadron in January 1952. On 15 June 1953, she took part in the Fleet Review held at Spithead to celebrate the Coronation of Queen Elizabeth II. The ship was used to portray a German anti-submarine vessel in the 1955 film The Cockleshell Heroes.

Flint Castle was taken out of service in March 1956 at Devonport Dockyard, until her demolition began, starting on 10 July 1958 at Faslane. While her service was uneventful, Flint Castle was awarded the battle honour of Atlantic 1944–45.

== Bibliography ==
- Campbell, N. J. M. (1980). "Great Britain (including Empire Forces)". In Chesneau, Roger (ed.). Conway's All the World's Fighting Ships 1922–1946. Conway Maritime Press. pp. 2–85. ISBN 0-85177-146-7.
- Colledge, J. J.; Warlow, Ben (2006) [1969]. Ships of the Royal Navy: The Complete Record of All Fighting Ships of the Royal Navy from the 15th Century to the Present (3rd Rev ed.). London: Chatham Publishing. ISBN 978-1-86176-281-8. OCLC 67375475.
- Goodwin, Norman; compiled by (2007). Castle Class Corvettes: An Account of the Service of the Ships and of Their Ships' Companies. Maritime Books. ISBN 978-1-904459-27-9.
- Lenton, H. T. (1998). British & Empire Warships of the Second World War. Naval Institute Press. ISBN 1-55750-048-7.
