= HMY Britannia =

Museum ship, former royal yacht of the British monarch

Coordinates: 55°58′56″N 3°10′38″W

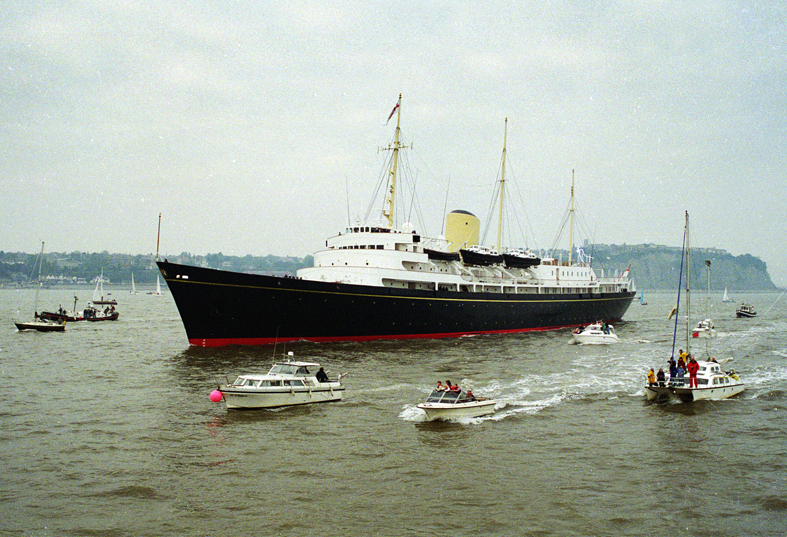
- Britannia departs Cardiff for the last time.

History

United Kingdom
- Name: Britannia
- Owner: The Royal Yacht Britannia Trust
- Ordered: 4 February 1952
- Builder: John Brown & Company, Glasgow, Scotland
- Yard number: 691
- Laid down: 16 June 1952
- Launched: 16 April 1953
- Commissioned: 11 January 1954
- Decommissioned: 11 December 1997
- Identification: IMO number: 8635306
- Status: Museum ship

General characteristics
- Tonnage: 5,769 GT
- Length: 412 ft (126 m)
- Beam: 55 ft (17 m)
- Height: 123 ft (37 m) to top of mainmast
- Draught: 15 ft (4.6 m)
- Installed power: 12,000 hp (8,900 kW)
- Propulsion: 2 Pametrada steam turbines
- Speed: 21.5 knots (39.8 km/h; 24.7 mph)
- Range: 2,400 nautical miles (4,400 km)
- Capacity: 250 guests
- Crew: 21 officers; 250 Royal Yachtsmen

Her Majesty's Yacht Britannia is the former royal yacht of the British monarchy. She was in their service from 1954 to 1997. She was the 83rd such vessel since King Charles II acceded to the throne in 1660, and is the second royal yacht to bear the name, the first being the racing cutter built for the Prince of Wales in 1893. During her 43-year career, the yacht travelled more than one million nautical miles (1.9 million kilometres) around the world to more than 600 ports in 135 countries. Now retired from royal service, Britannia is permanently berthed at Ocean Terminal, Leith in Edinburgh, Scotland, where she is a visitor attraction with over 300,000 visits each year.

== Design ==
HMY Britannia was designed by the Department of Naval Construction (DNC) under the direct supervision of Sir Victor Shepheard, the Director of Naval Construction. His personal team in London carried out the work under the charge of AN Harrison, the Assistant DNC. The work required frequent consultations by Shepheard and Harrison with HM King George VI and later with HM Queen Elizabeth II and HRH The Duke of Edinburgh.

Great importance was placed on habitability. The design required a comfortable motion, thus requiring a stabiliser. Trials exposed singing propellors, and these were reprofiled to reduce noise levels onboard.

== Construction ==
HMY Britannia was built at the shipyard of John Brown & Co. Ltd in Clydebank, Dunbartonshire. She was launched by Queen Elizabeth II on 16 April 1953, and commissioned on 11 January 1954. The ship was designed with three masts: a 133-foot (41 m) foremast, a 139-foot (42 m) mainmast, and a 118-foot (36 m) mizzenmast. The top aerial on the foremast and the top 20 feet (6 m) of the mainmast were hinged to allow the ship to pass under bridges.

Britannia was additionally designed to be converted into a hospital ship in time of war, however when the need came in the Falklands War this role went unfulfilled as Britannia, unique among the Royal Navy's fleet, required heavy fuel oil (common when she was commissioned but unique to her in 1982) and had only a 200-bed capacity. Instead the P&O liner SS Uganda was requisitioned and modified to become a hospital ship.

In the event of nuclear war, it was intended for the Queen and Prince Philip, Duke of Edinburgh, to take refuge aboard Britannia off the north-west coast of Scotland.

== Crew ==
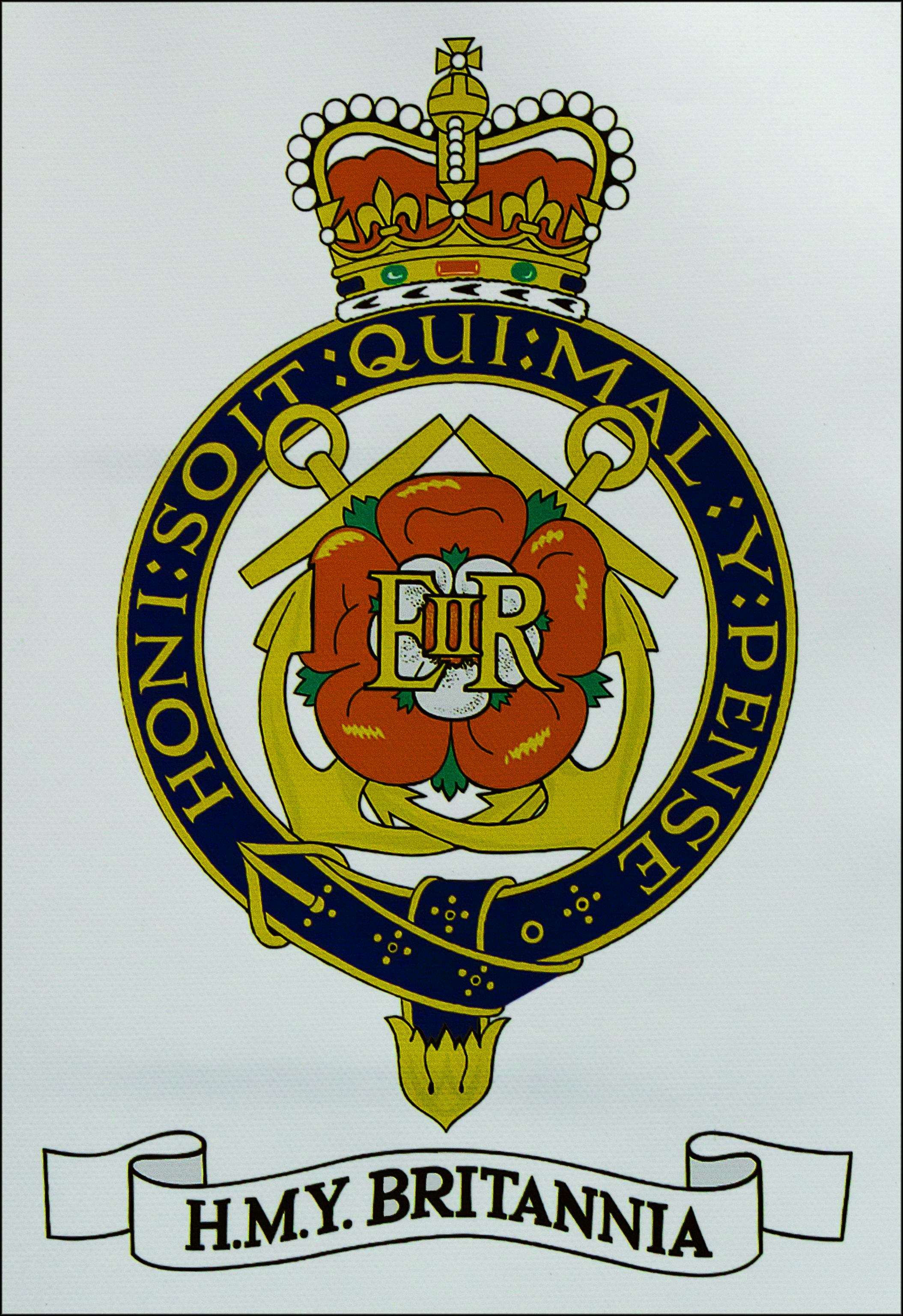
Royal Yacht Britannia Crest

Royal Navy officers were appointed for up to two years. The crew were volunteers from the general service of the Royal Navy. After 365 days' service, they could be admitted to the Permanent Royal Yacht Service as Royal Yachtsmen and serve until they chose to leave the service or were dismissed for medical or disciplinary reasons. As a result, some served for 20 years or more. The crew also included a detachment of Royal Marines. A contingent of Royal Marines Band members embarked whenever Britannia was on duty away from home port.

== History ==
Britannia sailed on her maiden voyage from Portsmouth to Grand Harbour, Malta, departing on 14 April and arriving on 22 April 1954. She carried Prince Charles and Princess Anne to Malta in order for them to meet the Queen and the Duke of Edinburgh at the end of the royal couple's Commonwealth tour. The Queen and the Duke of Edinburgh embarked on Britannia for the first time in Tobruk on 1 May 1954.

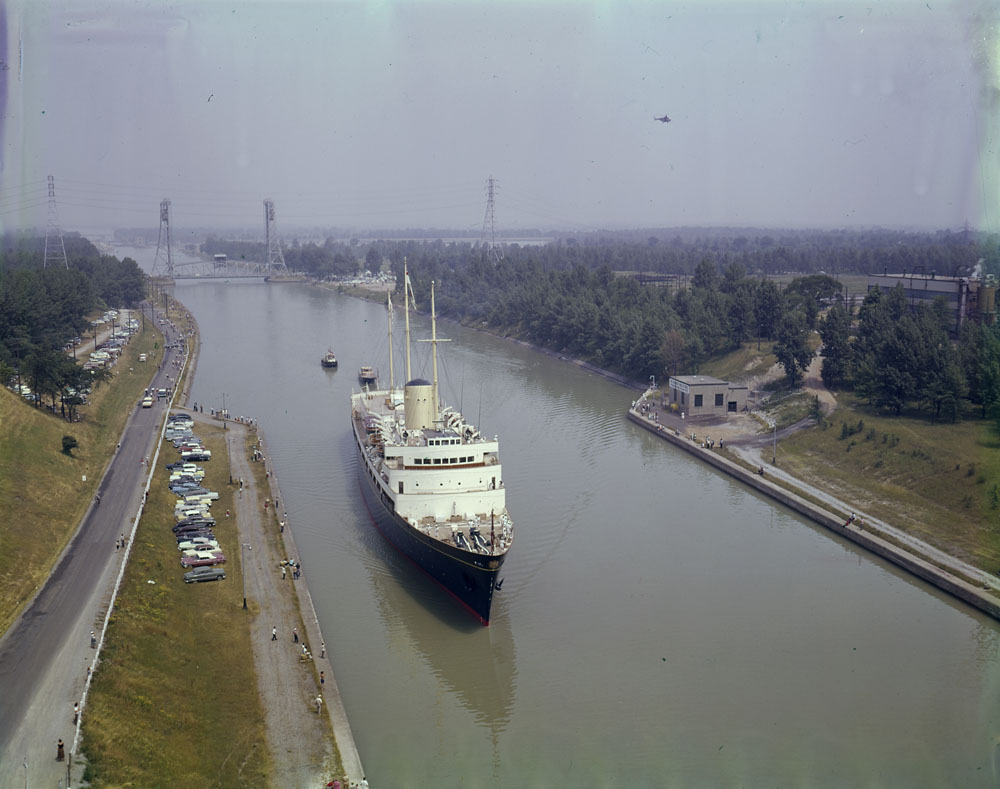
HMY Britannia on the Welland Canal in Canada, en route to Chicago in 1959, as part of the celebration for the opening of the Saint Lawrence Seaway

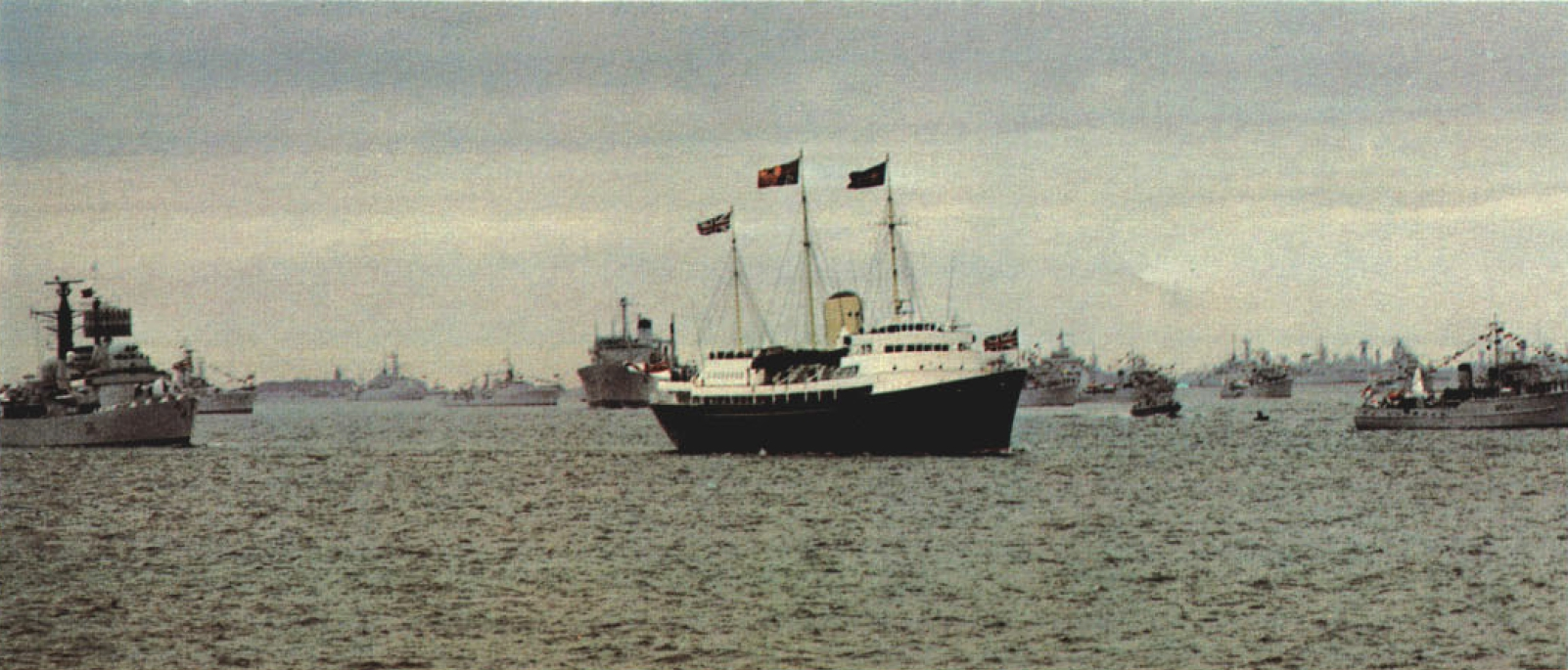
Britannia at the Spithead Fleet Review for the Silver Jubilee, 1977

On 20 July 1959, Britannia sailed the newly opened Saint Lawrence Seaway en route from Canada to Chicago, where she docked, making the Queen the first British monarch to visit the city. U.S. president Dwight D. Eisenhower was aboard Britannia for part of this cruise; Presidents Gerald Ford, Ronald Reagan, and Bill Clinton were welcomed aboard in later years. Anne and Mark Phillips took their honeymoon cruise aboard the ship in 1973; Charles would do the same with Diana in 1981. The ship evacuated over 1,000 refugees from the civil war in Aden in 1986. The vessel sailed to Canada in 1991 and made ports of call in Toronto and Kingston, Ontario.

HMY Britannia, when on royal duties, was escorted by a Royal Navy warship. The yacht was a regular sight at Cowes Week in early August and, usually, for the remainder of the month, was home to the Queen and her family for an annual cruise around the islands off the west coast of Scotland (known as the "Western Isles Tour").

During her career as Royal Yacht, Britannia conveyed the Queen, other members of the Royal Family and various dignitaries on 696 foreign visits to 135 countries and 272 visits in British waters. In this time, Britannia steamed 1,087,623 nautical miles (2,014,278 km).

=== Decommissioning ===
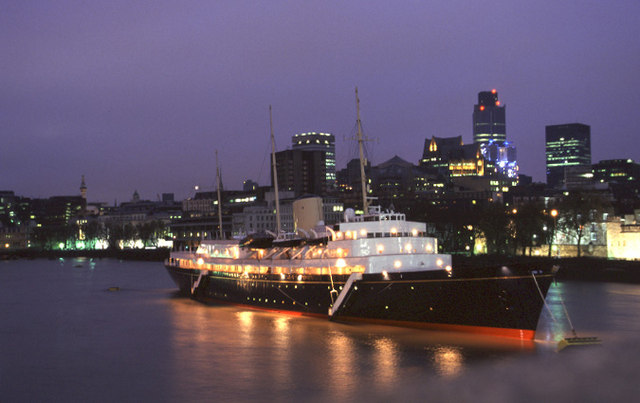
London, 1997

In 1994, the Conservative government announced the yacht's retirement:

The yacht last underwent a major refit in 1987. A further refit at an estimated cost of some £17 million would be necessary in 1996–97 but would only prolong her life for a further five years. In view of her age, even after the refit she would be difficult to maintain and expensive to run. It has therefore been decided to decommission "Britannia" in 1997. The Government will now consider the question of whether to replace "Britannia".

— Viscount Cranborne, House of Lords Hansard: Written Answers 23 June 1994

In January 1997, the government committed itself to replacing the Royal Yacht if reelected. The timing of the announcement, close to a general election, was controversial; The Guardian Weekly called it "part of a populist appeal to wavering Tory voters in the run-up to the general election" and reported that the Queen was "furious" that the Royal Family was "dragged into the centre of the election campaign, just as it is fighting to restore its public image." Sir Edward Heath publicly objected to the government's handling of the issue, stating "The Conservative Party above all must be an honourable party. And I don't believe the actions that have been taken are honourable ones and should never have been taken in this way."

The government argued that the cost was justified by its role in foreign policy and promoting British interests abroad, particularly through conferences held by British Invisibles, formerly the Committee on Invisible Exports. It was estimated by the Overseas Trade Board that events held on board the yacht helped raise £3 billion for HM Treasury between 1991 and 1995 alone.

The Labour opposition announced it would not commit the use of public funds for a replacement vessel for at least the first two years of any new Labour government. After its election victory in May 1997, the new government considered multiple options for the future of a royal yacht, but concluded in October of that year that Britannia would not be replaced:

We made clear that we would not spend public money on a Royal Yacht and I am keeping that promise. We in the Ministry of Defence have to justify every penny of the taxpayers' money that we spend and in this case I could not do so, particularly – as the Queen has made clear – since a Yacht is not needed for Royal travel. We considered in detail all private finance options, but these would only have been viable with a substantial annual subsidy from public funds.

— George Robertson, Defence Secretary,

The Royal Yacht's final foreign mission was to convey the last Governor of Hong Kong, Chris Patten, and the Prince of Wales back from Hong Kong after its handover to the People's Republic of China on 1 July 1997. Britannia was decommissioned on 11 December 1997. The Queen, normally undemonstrative in public, was reported to have cried at the decommissioning ceremony that was attended by most of the senior members of the Royal Family.

== Visitor attraction ==
Listed as part of the National Historic Fleet, Britannia is a visitor attraction moored in the historic Port of Leith in Edinburgh, Scotland, and is cared for by the Royal Yacht Britannia Trust, a registered charity. There was some controversy over the siting of the ship, with some arguing that she would be better moored on the River Clyde, where she was built, than in Edinburgh, with which the yacht had few links. Her positioning in Leith coincided with a redevelopment of the harbour area.

Entrance to the yacht is via the Ocean Terminal development, and over 300,000 people visit the Royal Yacht Britannia every year. She is one of the UK's top evening events venues. On 18 May 2006, the Swiss-born Hollywood actress and first Bond girl, Ursula Andress, celebrated her 70th birthday on board. On 29 July 2011, a drinks reception was held on board Britannia for Queen Elizabeth's granddaughter Zara Phillips and her then-fiancé, Mike Tindall, to celebrate their forthcoming wedding.

An early Land Rover in much-restored shape is displayed in the on-board garage and a retired Rolls-Royce Phantom V state car is parked on the wharf below the ship. The tour of the five decks open to the public includes the Queen's bedroom, which can be viewed behind a glass wall, and the state dining and drawing rooms, which hosted grand receptions for kings and queens, presidents and prime ministers throughout the world. The clocks on board are stopped at 3:01, the time that the Queen last disembarked. The royal deck tea room was added in 2009.

The 1936 racing yacht Bloodhound, once owned by the Queen and Prince Philip, is now berthed alongside Britannia. Bloodhound was one of the most successful ocean-racing yachts ever built and was the yacht on which King Charles III and the Princess Royal learned to sail. The Royal Yacht Britannia Trust bought Bloodhound in early 2010 and she is the centrepiece of an exhibition focusing on the Royal Family's passion for sailing. Visitors can view Bloodhound from a specially built pontoon when the racing yacht is in port. During July and August, she is berthed in Oban marina and is available for private charter, as she sails around the islands once visited by the Royal Family during their annual fortnight holiday in the Western Isles of Scotland. During this period, Royal Yachtsmen (Yotties) from Britannia's original crew sail the yacht for the Britannia Trust.

From 2019, the MV Fingal has been permanently berthed near Britannia at the Albert Dock Basin. The Fingal is a former Northern Lighthouse Board ship converted into a boutique hotel owned by the Royal Yacht Britannia Trust.

== Proposals for successor ==
Proposals for the construction of a new royal yacht, perhaps financed through a loan or by the royal family's own funds, have made little headway. In 2019 it was reported that the late Sir Donald Gosling donated £50 million in his will to pay for it.

In May 2021, Prime Minister Boris Johnson announced the construction of a new royal yacht, named after Prince Philip, Duke of Edinburgh. He said that the "new national flagship" – a ship rather than a luxury yacht – would enter service within the next four years and cost up to £200 million. By 2022 plans had progressed to two favoured design teams, and cost estimates were up to £250m, with annual running costs of up to £30m. In November 2022, the Sunak government cancelled the plans in favour of the procurement of a multi-role ocean surveillance ship.

== Commanding officers ==
- Captain J. S. Dalglish, 7 January – 28 April 1954
- Vice Admiral Sir Conolly Abel Smith, 28 April 1954 – 30 January 1958
- Vice Admiral Sir Peter Dawnay, 30 January 1958 – 25 January 1962
- Rear Admiral Sir Joseph Henley, 25 January 1962 – 9 March 1965
- Rear Admiral Sir Patrick Morgan, 9 March 1965 – 1 September 1970
- Rear Admiral Sir Richard Trowbridge, 1 September 1970 – 11 September 1975
- Rear Admiral Sir Hugh Janion, 11 September 1975 – 4 February 1981
- Rear Admiral Sir Paul Greening, 4 February 1981 – 12 September 1985
- Rear Admiral Sir John Garnier, 12 September 1985 – 18 September 1990
- Rear Admiral Sir Robert Woodard, 18 September 1990 – 1 April 1995
- Commodore Anthony Morrow, 1 April 1995 – 11 December 1997

== See also ==
- K1 Britannia, a planned replica of King George V's racing yacht Britannia to be used for charitable purposes.
- Hebridean Princess, twice chartered by Queen Elizabeth II since the retirement of HMY Britannia.
- Gloriana, a Royal barge in operation since 2012
- List of royal yachts of the United Kingdom
- The Royal Train
- Bentley State Limousine
- Air transport of the Royal Family
- Operation Candid, a Cold War era contingency plan involving HMY Britannia.

== Sources ==
- Shepeard, Victor (1954). "Her Majesty's Yacht Britannia"
- HMY Britannia (Caledonian Maritime Research Trust Database)
