= HMS Pink =

Flower-class corvette

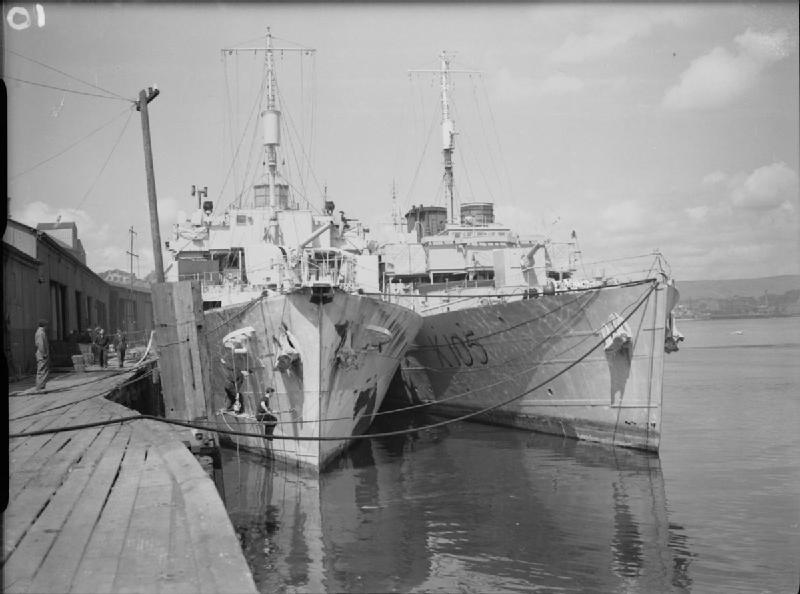
- Pink (left) being repainted

History

United Kingdom
- Name: Pink
- Namesake: Dianthus plumarius (Pink)
- Builder: Henry Robb, Leith
- Laid down: 20 May 1941
- Launched: 16 February 1942
- Commissioned: 2 July 1942
- Stricken: 27 June 1944
- Identification: Pennant number: K137
- Fate: Scrapped, 1947

General characteristics
- Class & type: Flower-class corvette
- Displacement: 925 long tons
- Length: 205 ft (62 m) o/a
- Beam: 33 ft (10 m)
- Draught: 11 ft 6 in (3.51 m)
- Propulsion: 1 × 4-cycle triple-expansion reciprocating steam engine; 2 × fire tube Scotch boilers; Single shaft; 2,750 ihp (2,050 kW)
- Speed: 16 kn (30 km/h)
- Range: 3,500 nmi (6,500 km) at 12 kn (22 km/h)
- Complement: 85
- Sensors & processing systems: 1 × SW1C or 2C radar; 1 × Type 123A or Type 127DV sonar
- Armament: 1 × BL 4-inch (101.6 mm) Mk.IX gun; 2 × Vickers .50 cal machine gun (twin); 2 × Lewis .303 cal machine gun (twin); 2 × Mk.II Depth charge throwers; 2 × Depth charge rails with 40 depth charges

HMS Pink (K137) was a Flower-class corvette that served in the Royal Navy. She was built by Henry Robb in Leith in 1941 and named after the flower nicknamed garden pink. She was commissioned in 1942 and scrapped in 1947.

== Design and description ==
In early 1939, with the risk of war with Nazi Germany increasing, it was clear to the Royal Navy that it needed more escort ships to counter the threat from Kriegsmarine U-boats. One particular concern was the need to protect shipping off the east coast of Britain. What was needed was something larger and faster than trawlers, but still cheap enough to be built in large numbers, preferably at small merchant shipyards, as larger yards were already busy. To meet this requirement, the Smiths Dock Company of Middlesbrough, a specialist in the design and build of fishing vessels, offered a development of its 700-ton, 16 knots (18 mph; 30 km/h) whale catcher Southern Pride. They were intended as small convoy escort ships that could be produced quickly and cheaply in large numbers. Despite naval planners' intentions that they be deployed for coastal convoys, their long range meant that they became the mainstay of Mid-Ocean Escort Force convoy protection during the first half of the war. The original Flowers had the standard RN layout, consisting of a raised forecastle, a well deck, then the bridge or wheelhouse, and a continuous deck running aft. The crew quarters were in the foc'sle while the galley was at the rear, making for poor messing arrangements.

The modified Flowers saw the forecastle extended aft past the bridge to the aft end of the funnel, a variation known as the "long forecastle" design. Apart from providing a very useful space where the whole crew could gather out of the weather, the added weight improved the ships' stability and speed and was retroactively applied to a number of the original Flower-class vessels during the mid and latter years of the war.

== Construction and career ==
Pink was laid down by Henry Robb at their shipyard at Leith, on 20 May 1941 and launched on 16 February 1942. She was commissioned on 2 July 1942.

HMS Pink was on a screening mission off Normandy during the Invasion of Normandy on 27 June 1944. An unidentified German U-boat launched a torpedo which struck HMS Pink crippling the ship. She was towed back to Portsmouth, declared a total loss and scrapped at Llanelly in 1947.
