= Forth Ports =

Port operator in Edinburgh, Scotland

Forth Ports Ltd.
- Type: Privately held company
- Industry: Port management
- Founded: 1967
- Headquarters: Edinburgh, Scotland, UK
- Key people: Stuart Wallace, CEO
- Revenue: £181.9 million (2010)
- Operating income: £49.8 million (2010)
- Net income: £45.1 million (2010)
- Owner: Public Sector Pension Investment Board
- Website: www.forthports.co.uk

Forth Ports Limited is a port operator in the United Kingdom based in Edinburgh, Scotland. It is owned by the Public Sector Pension Investment Board.

== History ==
Forth Ports was established on 15 December 1967 as the Forth Ports Authority. It became responsible for pilotage on the Firth of Forth in 1988. It was privatised and first listed on the London Stock Exchange in 1992. In 1995 it acquired the Port of Dundee on the River Tay and the Port of Tilbury on the River Thames. In 2007 it bought the Nordic Group, who manage terminal operations at Chatham. In March 2011, Forth Ports agreed to a £751 million takeover by Arcus Infrastructure Partners. The deal was completed in June 2011. In October 2018, Forth Ports was sold to the Public Sector Pension Investment Board.

== Operations ==
Forth Ports operates six ports on the Firth of Forth and two ports elsewhere:

=== Ports on the Firth of Forth ===
- Grangemouth is Scotland's largest container port. It is located at the head of the Firth of Forth in the heart of central Scotland.
- Burntisland is located in Fife on the north side of the Firth of Forth.
- Methil is also situated in Fife on the northern shores of the Firth of Forth. It has two docks and is able to take vessels up to 3,000 DWT. The Port specialises as a wood pulp and timber distribution centre.
- Kirkcaldy is located in Fife on the northern side of the Firth of Forth having re-opened in 2011 for commercial business.
- Rosyth is located 8 mi (13 km) from Edinburgh and 40 mi (64 km) from Glasgow, on the north shore of the Firth of Forth immediately west of the Forth Road Bridge and the Forth Bridge.
- The Port of Leith is located on the southern banks of the Firth of Forth and is just over 1.2 mi (1.9 km) north of Edinburgh city centre. The Port of Leith is the largest, enclosed, deep-water port in Scotland and has the capability to handle ships up to 50,000 DWT. The port offers a full stevedoring and cargo handling service.

=== Other ports ===
- Dundee is the most northerly port owned by Forth Ports and is located on the north side of the Firth of Tay on the east coast of Scotland. The port provides services in paper pulp and forest products and also a wide range of general and bulk cargoes.
- Port of Tilbury, the only English port operated by the company is located on the River Thames and is part of the Port of London. It is the UK's leading paper-handling port and also specialises in containers, bulk stored products and building materials. It is also the London location for the start of "no fly" holidays by the Ambassador Cruise Line.

=== Property ===
Forth Ports' property business owns 400 acres (1.6 km^{2}) of land which is available for development and which form the major part of Edinburgh's waterfront.

== See also ==
- Associated British Ports
- Peel Ports
