= Ocean Terminal, Edinburgh =

Ocean Terminal
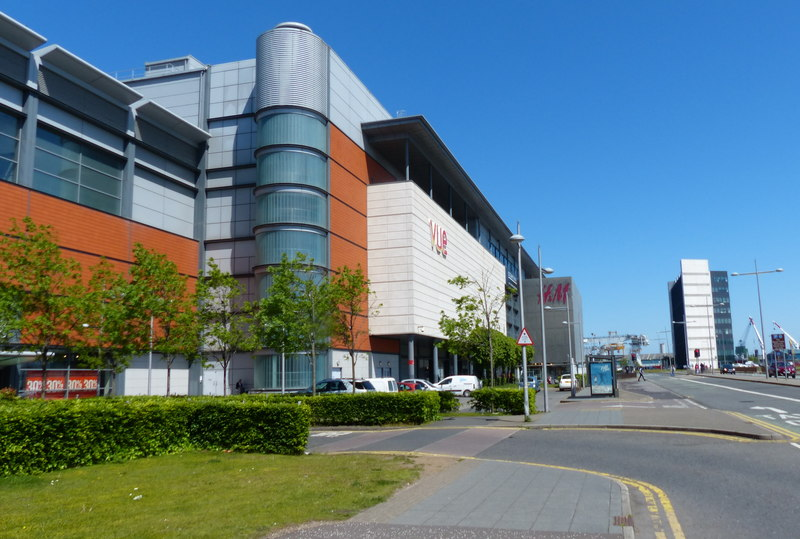
- View from the south in 2017
- Location: Edinburgh, Scotland
- Coordinates: 55°58′53″N 3°10′37″W
- Address: Ocean Drive; Leith; Edinburgh; EH6 6JJ
- Opened: 2001
- Developer: Forth Ports
- Owner: ICG Group / Ambassador Group
- Architect: Sir Terence Conran
- Num. of stores: 85
- Parking: 800
- Public transit: Ocean Terminal
- Website: www.oceanterminal.com

Ocean Terminal is the largest shopping centre in the Leith area of Edinburgh, Scotland.

== History ==
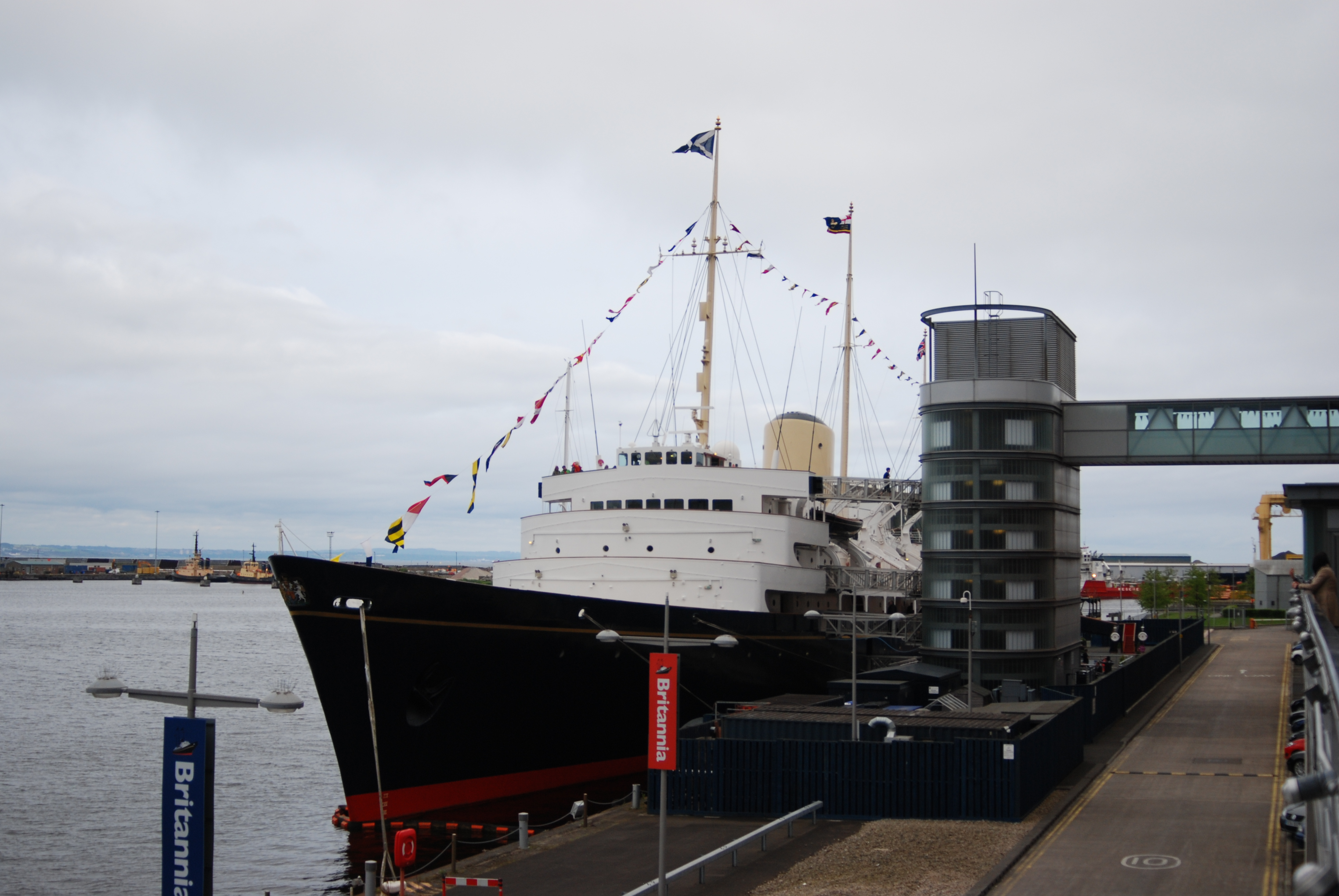
Royal Yacht Britannia

It is built on former industrial docklands on the north side of the city, at the edge of the boundary between formerly separate ports of Newhaven and Leith. The land was formerly occupied by the Henry Robb shipyard, which closed in 1983. Since then, the area has undergone urban renewal and regeneration, much led by and on the lands in the ownership of Forth Ports.

These and other developments have played key parts in the regeneration of Leith. The now-decommissioned Royal Yacht Britannia, which is accessed via the Britannia Visitor Centre within Ocean Terminal, is permanently berthed next to the building and can be viewed from the centre. Although originally planned to also function as a working passenger terminal, the permanent berthing of the Britannia has meant that the building has never been used for this function, despite its name.

The berth occupied by Britannia was originally planned to handle cruise liners. As Britannia is now permanently moored alongside the Ocean Terminal, Forth Ports plan to build another terminal for cruise liners.

There is an Antony Gormley sculpture located on an abandoned pier behind the building.

In September 2025 the centre was put on the market, for overs over £18 million. In February 2026 it was sold to the Fortress Investment Group for approximately £15 million.

== Current stores ==
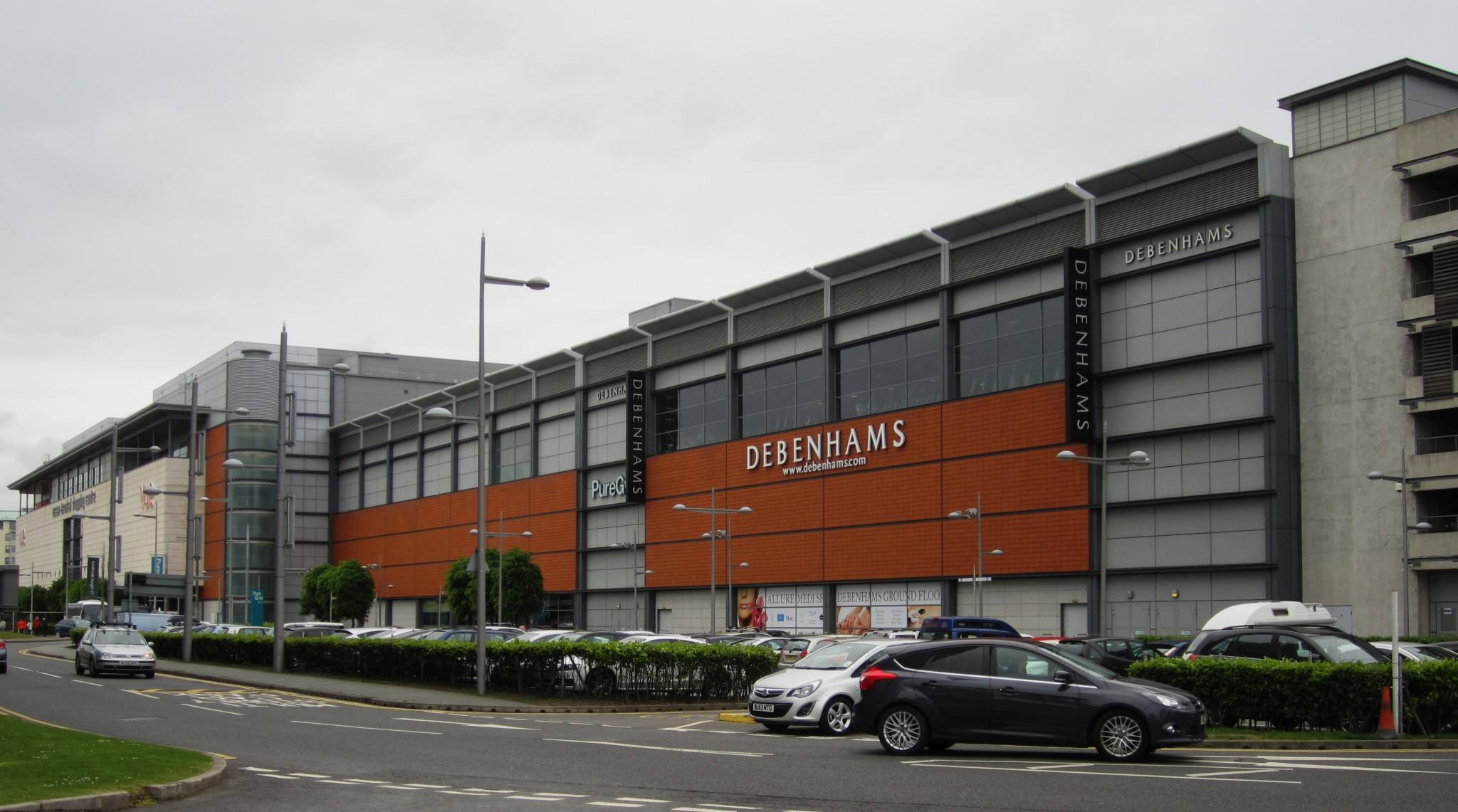
View of the northern section in 2014

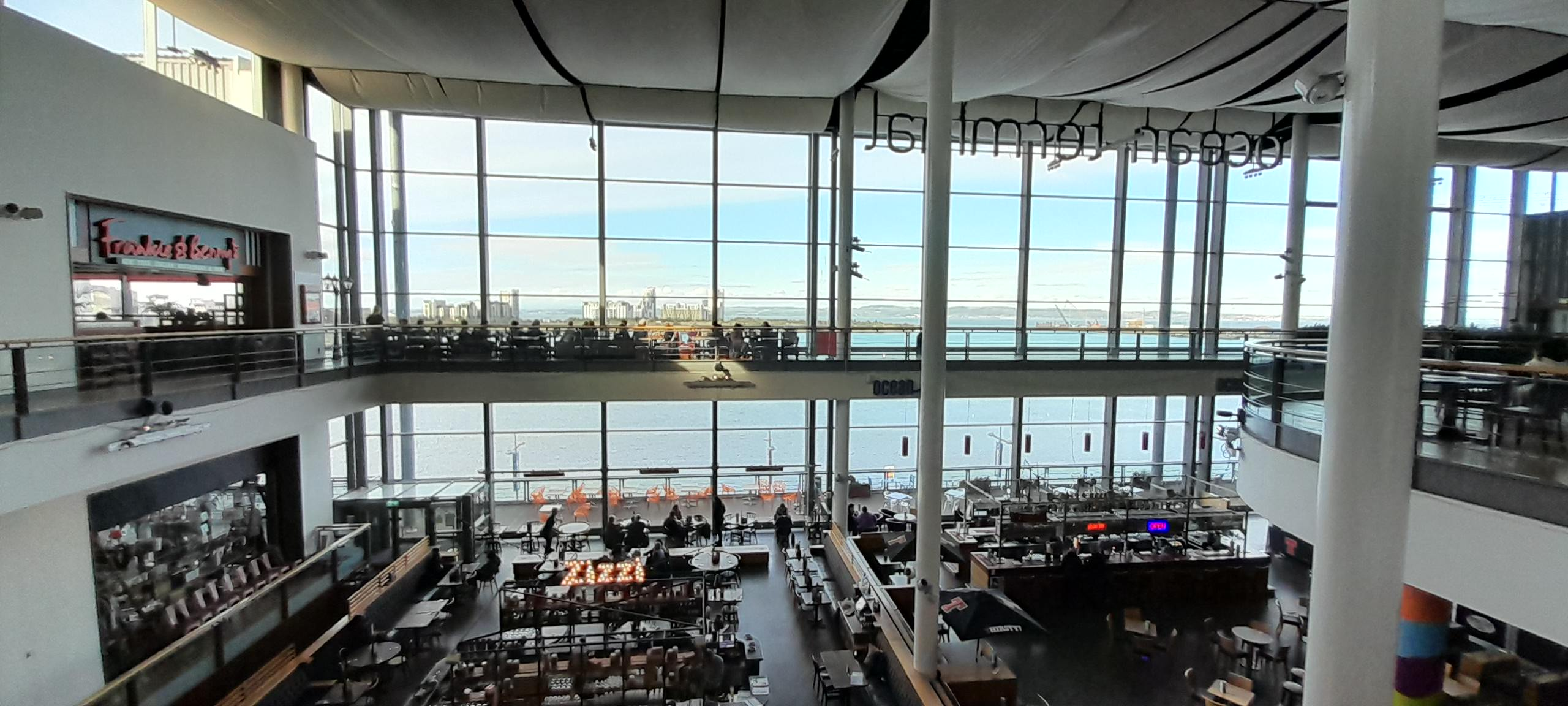
Ocean Dining food court overlooking Western Harbour

PureGym, H&M, Boots and HMV are amongst the main shops; in total there are some shops, 6 restaurants, 3 coffee shops, a variety of bars and cafés, as well as a 12-screen Vue cinema, an urban dance studio, children's play area and a day spa.

British Home Stores was an anchor tenant until 2016, and Debenhams until 2021.

The mall currently has an NHS vaccination clinic on the second floor.

== Transport ==
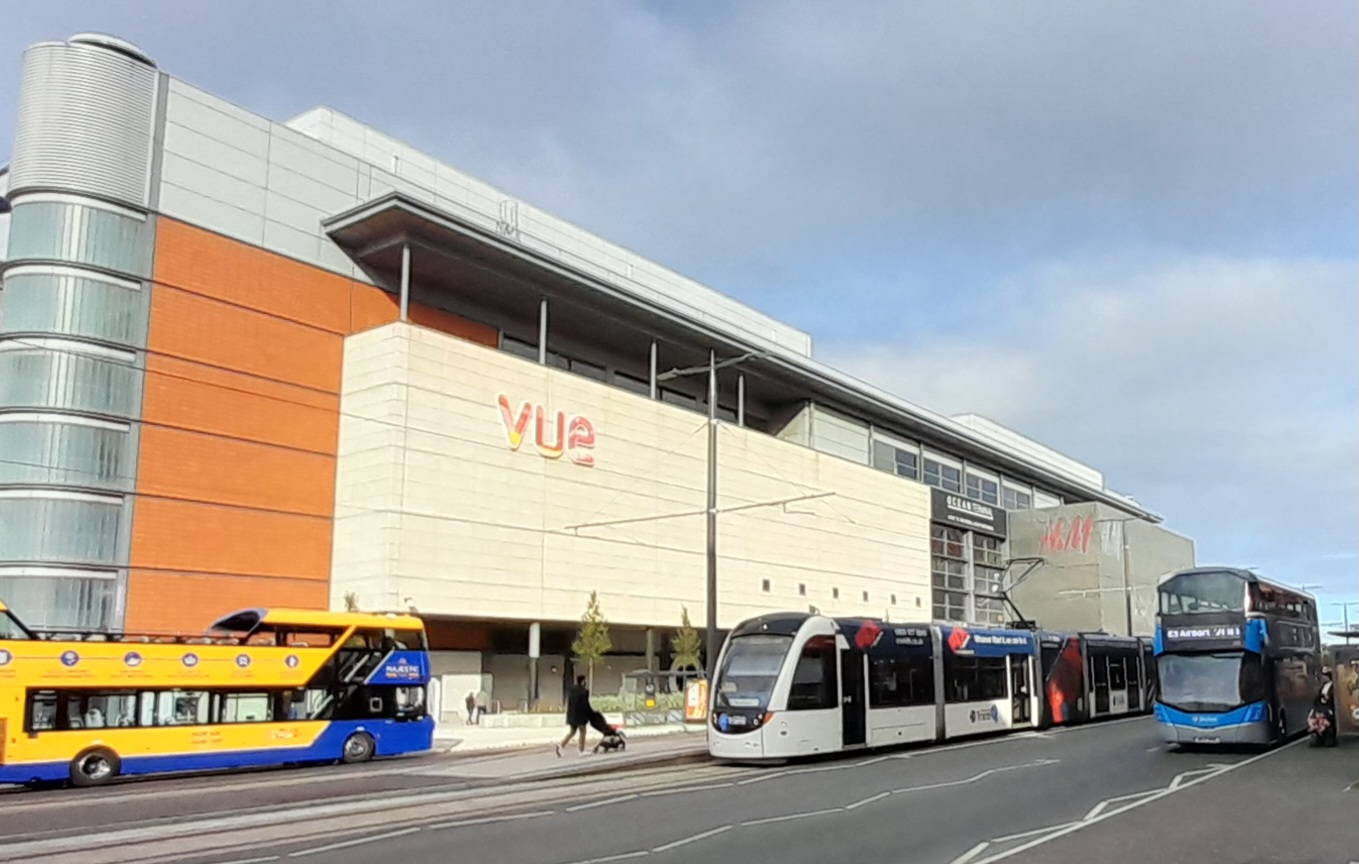
Bus & tram connections at the entrance

The centre has multi level car parking facilities at the Southern end of the building.

=== Buses ===
Lothian Buses services 10, 34, 35, 36 & Skylink 200 run from the stops at the front entrance.

Edinburgh Bus Tours also stop here on their Majestic route.

=== Tram ===
Ocean Terminal has a stop on the Edinburgh Trams light rail route, which opened with the Newhaven line extension in June 2023.

Services run to Newhaven and to the City Centre and Edinburgh Airport.

Ocean Terminal tram stop is an island platform located at the main entrance plaza.

Preceding station	Edinburgh Trams	Following station
Newhaven towards Newhaven	Newhaven – Edinburgh Airport	Port of Leith towards Airport

== Redevelopment ==
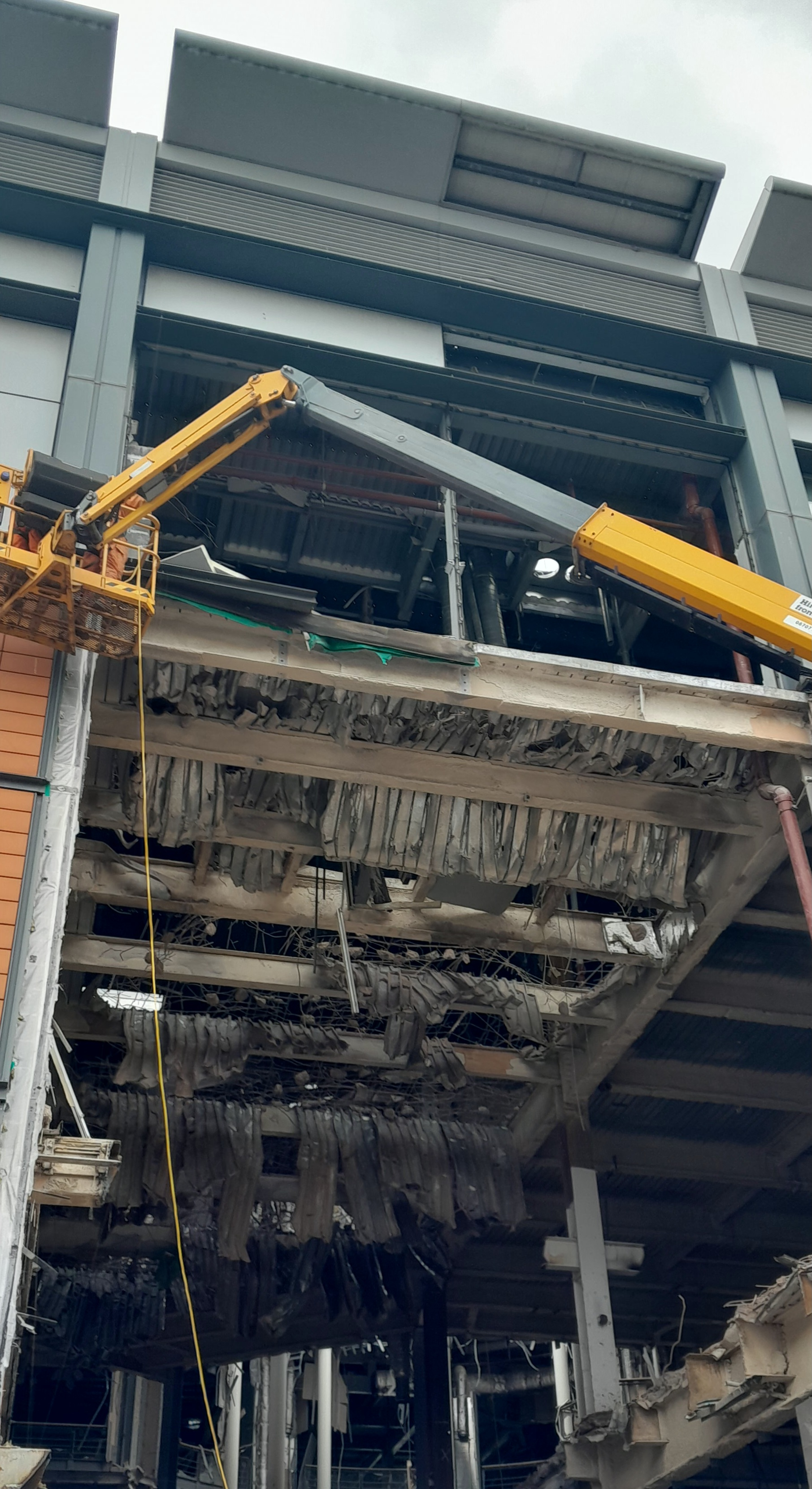
Demolition work on the north section, June 2024

In 2018, the previous owners of the centre announced plans to rebrand the centre as Porta, focusing on outlets and factory stores. These plans were dropped in June 2020 by the new owners, ICG Real Estate and Ambassador Group .

City of Edinburgh Council have approved plans for Phase One of a masterplan lodged by the centre’s owners that would see the northern section of the building demolished and a new frontage constructed, with retail units and public realm. The demolition work got underway in Spring 2024.

Plans were submitted in November 2022 for Phase Two, which includes a large scale residential development, and received unanimous council approval in January 2024.
