= MV Cuthred =

Former car and passenger ferry

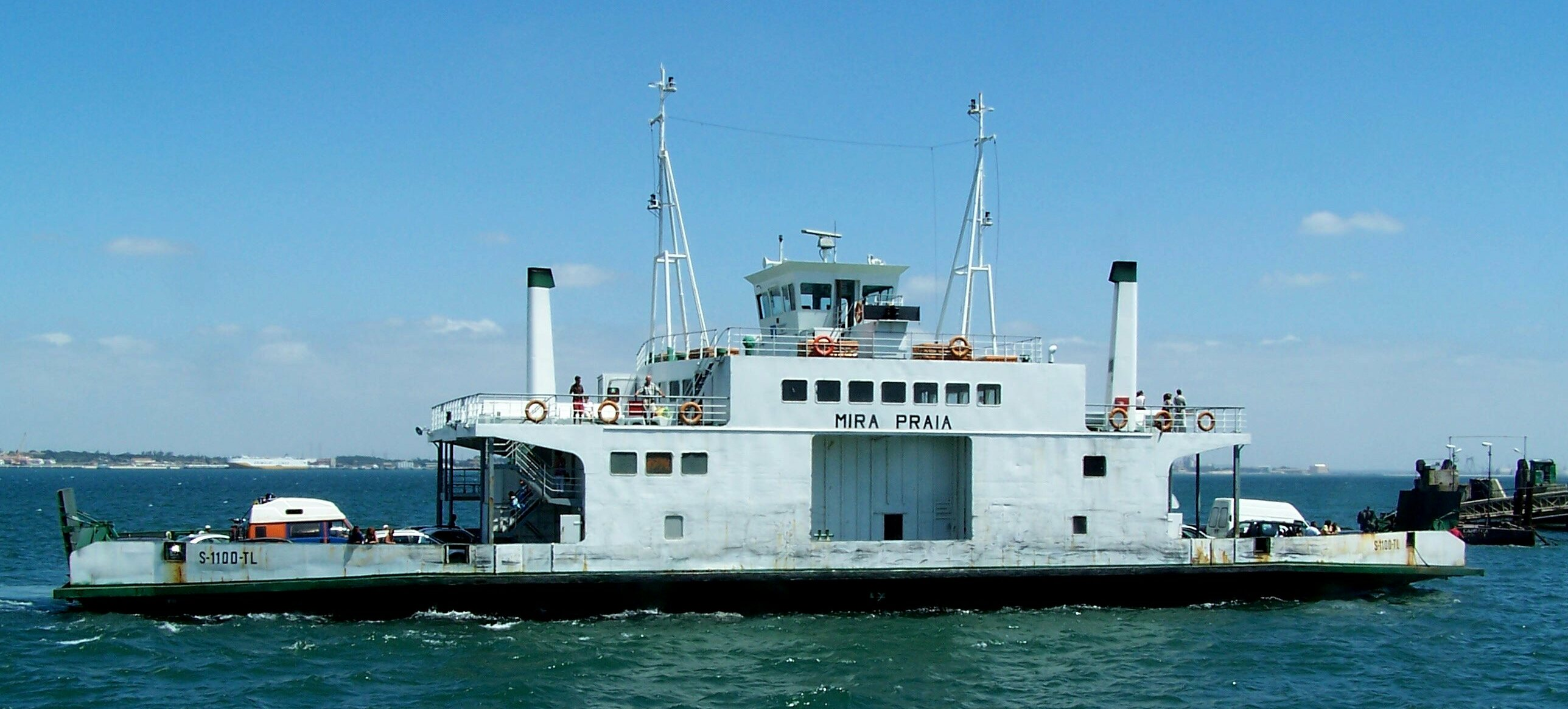
- As Mira Praia

History

United Kingdom
- Name: MV Cuthred
- Operator: 1969-1987 British Rail/Sealink/Wightlink; 1990-2009 Transado
- Route: 1969–1987 Portsmouth–Fishbourne
- Builder: Richards (Shipbuilders) Ltd, Lowestoft
- Launched: 3 June 1969
- In service: 28 June 1969
- Out of service: 2009
- Identification: IMO number: 6920238
- Fate: Remains laid up

General characteristics
- Class & type: Roll-on/roll-off Car & Passenger Ferry
- Tonnage: 704 Gross, 357 Net, 155 Deadweight.
- Displacement: 537 light
- Length: 190.0ft
- Beam: 51.6ft
- Draught: 6.50ft
- Installed power: Two Paxman 8RPHCM V8 turbocharged diesels, each 378bhp@900rpm.; One Ruston 6YEZ diesel engine driving a generator; Two main engine driven generators.
- Propulsion: 2x Voith Schneider 14EG/90 cycloidal propellers
- Speed: 10 knots

MV Cuthred was an Isle of Wight roll-on/roll-off ferry built in 1969. From 1990 until 2009, she operated as Mira Praia in Portugal.

== History ==
MV Cuthred was built by Richards of Lowestoft for British Rail (later Sealink) at a cost of £275,000 (equivalent to about £5,717,000 in 2023). She is named after Cuthred, king of Wessex (c.740–56). With a gross tonnage of 704, she was the largest Isle of Wight Ferry of the time, capable of carrying 48 cars and 400 passengers.

== Layout ==
Her design was unique, but formed the basis for the three sisters, MV Cenred, Cenwulf and Caedmon, built in 1973.

Propulsion was by means of two Voith Schneider cycloidal propellers mounted on diagonally opposite corners of the hull, each one being driven by a Paxman 8RPHCM turbocharged V8 diesel engine of 378 bhp (282 kW) at 900rpm.

== Service ==
She ran on the route until 1986, when Sealink ownership passed to Sea Containers. She was laid up in 1987 at Lymington for nearly 2 years. During 1989 she was sold to Open Leisure for use on the Tyne.

She remains laid up near Setubal to this day, slowly decaying, just a couple of miles from the route she served for almost 19 years.
