= Victoria of Wight =

Isle of Wight passenger and vehicle ferry

- Victoria of Wight leaving Portsmouth, 31 August 2018

History

United Kingdom
- Name: Victoria of Wight
- Operator: Wightlink
- Port of registry: Portsmouth
- Route: Portsmouth to Fishbourne
- Builder: Cemre Shipyard, Yalova, Turkey
- Cost: £30 million
- Yard number: NB0052
- Launched: 7 February 2018
- In service: 26 August 2018
- Identification: IMO number: 9791028; MMSI number: 232015630; Callsign: MDCW6
- Status: In service

General characteristics
- Class & type: Car Passenger Ferry (Victoria of Wight G Class)
- Tonnage: 8,041 GT
- Length: 89.7 m (294.3 ft)
- Beam: 19.4 m (63.6 ft)
- Draught: 2.6 m (8.5 ft)
- Propulsion: Diesel-electric/ battery hybrid system. 4x 1,475bhp 6-cyl Wärtsilä W6L20 diesel engines driving generators, 4 Voith Schneider 5-bladed cycloidal propellers driven by electric motors.
- Speed: 13 knots (24 km/h; 15 mph)
- Capacity: 1208 passengers, 178 cars
- Crew: 11

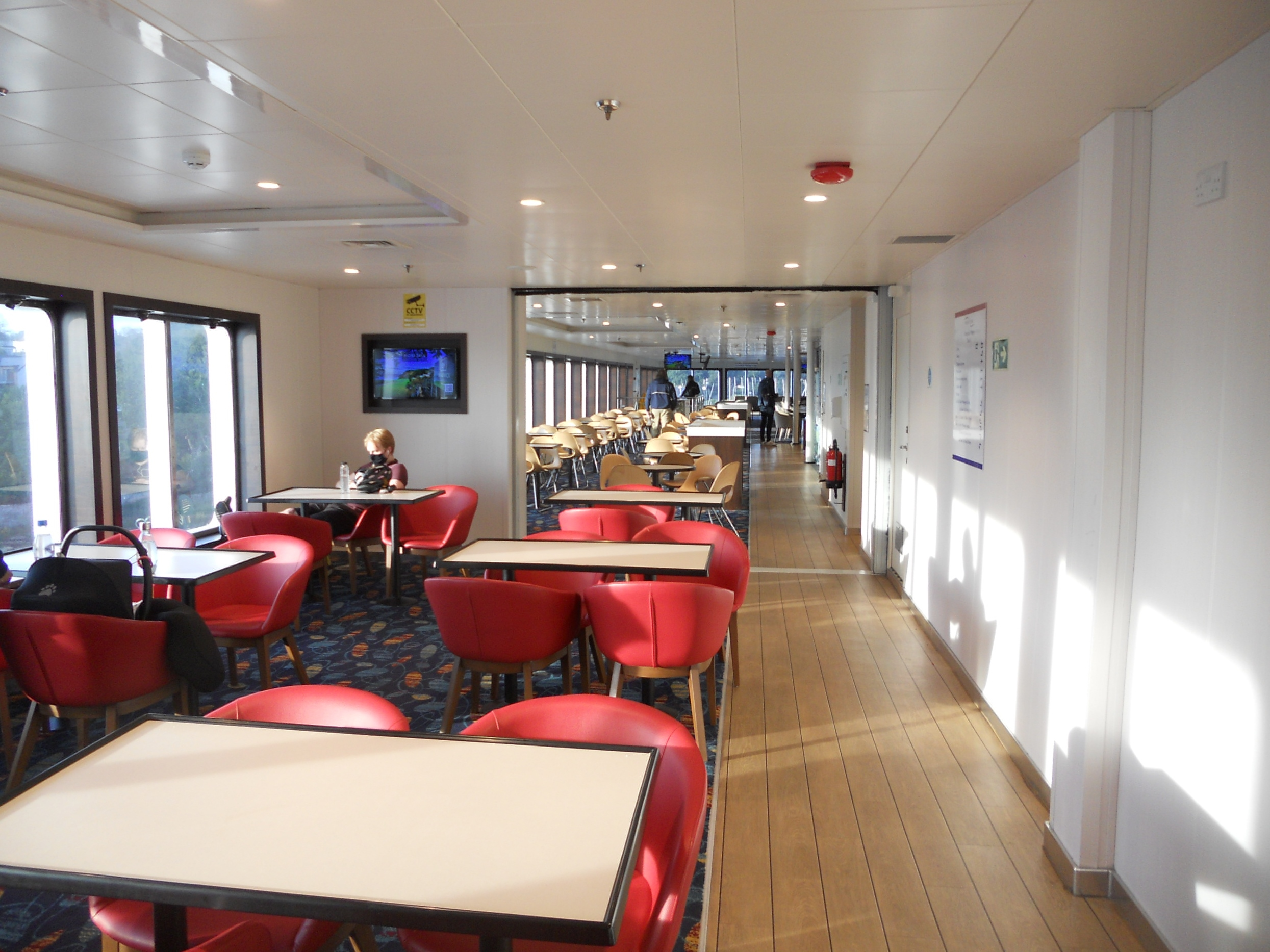
Passenger lounge

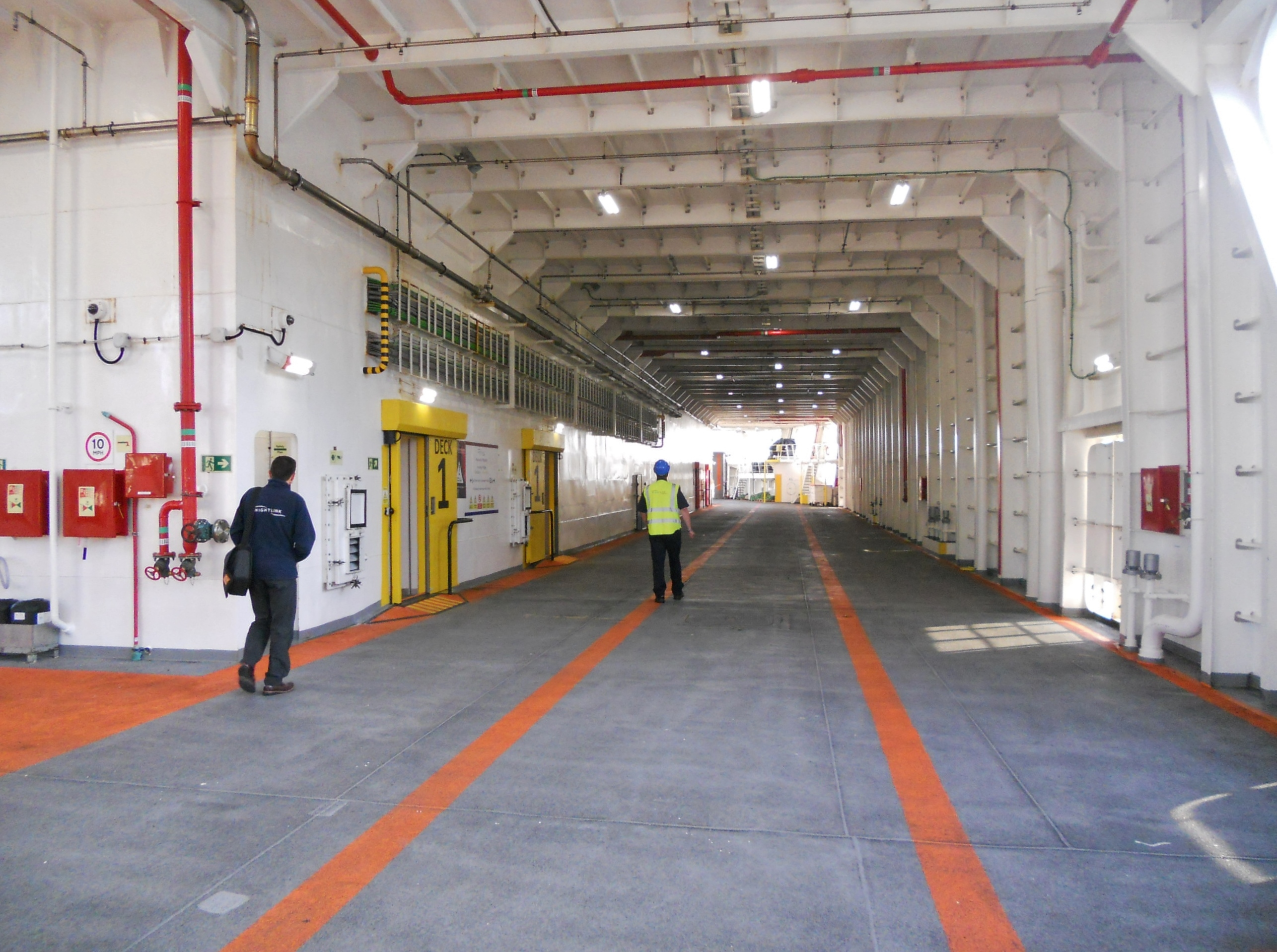
Vehicle deck

Victoria of Wight is a ship sailing on the Portsmouth to Fishbourne route operated by Wightlink. She entered service on 26 August 2018. Built by the Cemre Shipyard in Yalova for £30 million, she is the newest ship in the fleet and completed Wightlink's £45 million investment in the Portsmouth to Fishbourne route. In addition, upon introduction into service Victoria of Wight became the largest ship in the fleet and the new flagship.

While she is the broadest vessel to make regular crossings to the Isle of Wight, she is not the longest passenger ship, with Red Funnel's Raptor class ferries exceeding Victoria of Wight in length. The Victoria of Wight is notable for its use of a hybrid technology, combining battery power and conventional engines. This results in the ship being both quieter and releasing fewer emissions than the rest of Wightlink's fleet.

== History ==
The Victoria of Wight originated as part of Wightlink's £45 million investment, which aimed to improve facilities at Portsmouth terminal with a new building, and to introduce new double tier boarding ramps at Fishbourne and Portsmouth for quicker boarding of the St Clare and the new ferry. 22 tenders were received to construct the ship with Cemre Shipyard in Yalova eventually chosen for its cost effectiveness and ability to construct the ship within two years.

In October 2016, the steel cutting ceremony of the new ship marked the beginning of its construction.

Later the new ferry was renamed the Victoria of Wight in a staff competition held by Wightlink. The name is in recognition of Queen Victoria's history on the Isle of Wight, who would retreat to Osborne House during the summer.

After being launched in February 2018, she was fitted out, carrying out sea trials in the Sea of Marmara. On 16 July 2018, Victoria of Wight departed the Cemre shipyard to finally be transported to the Solent for crew training and introduction into service. Being towed by Amber II, a specialist tug, the journey took 25 days to complete.

On 26 August 2018, the Victoria of Wight began its maiden voyage on the 10:30 service from Portsmouth to Fishbourne, entering regular service. During the autumn, it was taken out of service during the weekdays to allow for more crew to be trained to operate it.

On 1 November 2019, during an early morning crossing from Fishbourne, the Victoria of Wight's propulsion system suffered a fault. She arrived in Portsmouth under reduced power accompanied by a tug, leading to the cancellation of further crossings that day.

== Technical ==
The ship is a diesel electric vessel operating at 690v 50Hz.

Four generators and two hybrid systems are coupled together to four variable speed propulsion motors via a tied, 4 section 690v BUS, coupled FWD to AFT with tie breakers, with LLC transformers strapping across each half.

The hybrid elements of the ship's powertrain are powered by a pair of 409 kWh battery arrays by Corvus Energy. The Orca Energy batteries provide support to four 1140KW 6 cylinder Wärtsilä diesel generators via, 1.5MW drives with active front ends following the generators, and DCDC choppers that take the 880v DC from the batteries and make it usable.

In operation the batteries supplement electrical load all the time in order to run the generators at the most efficient load, working as “generators” and parasitic load when recharging from the generators when engine load is light.

The vessel can supply all electrical load in port purely from stored battery energy, reducing in-port engine emissions.
