= MV St Cecilia =

Former Isle of Wight vehicle and passenger ferry

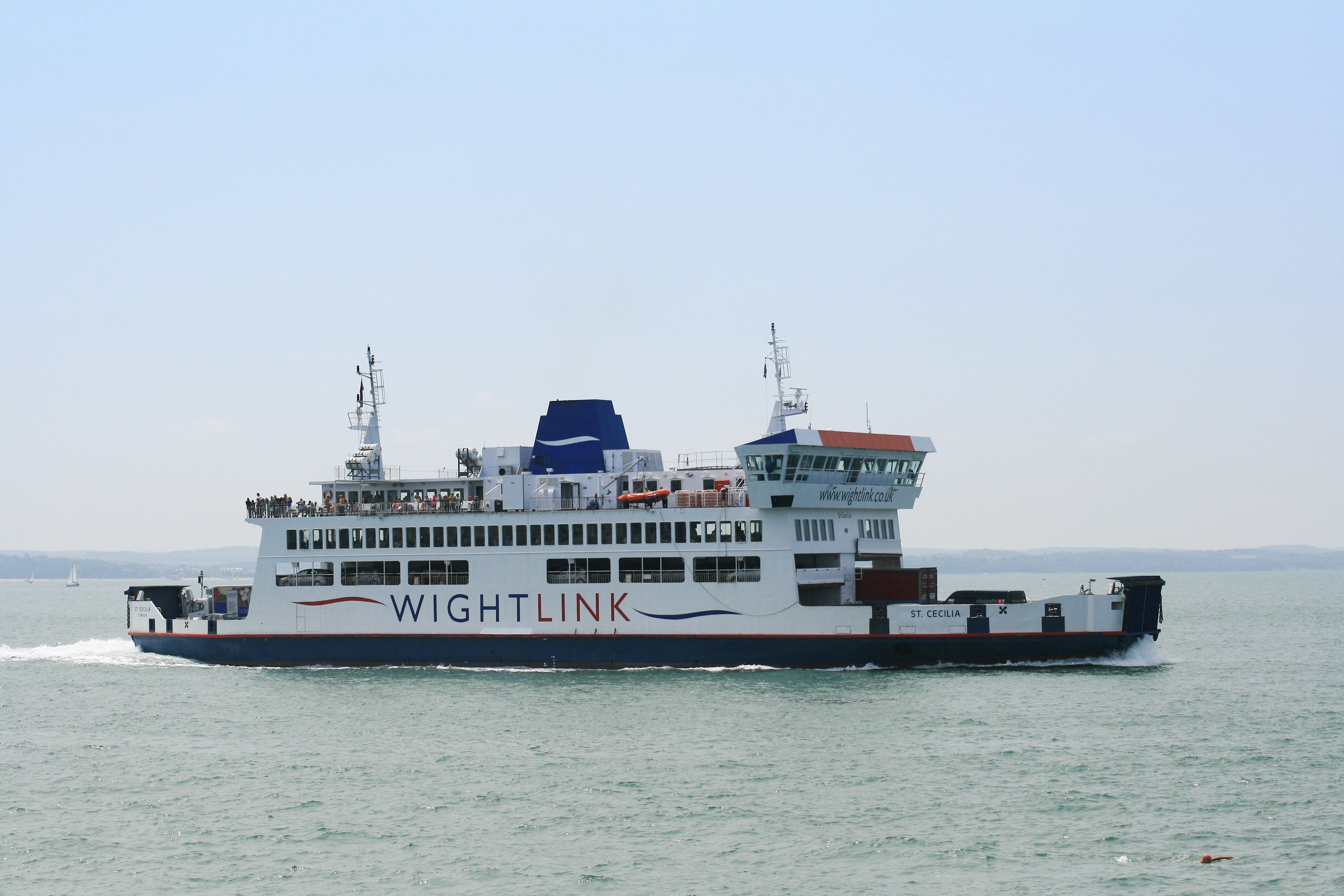
- St Cecilia in Portsmouth Harbour

History

United Kingdom
- Name: St Cecilia Nando Murrau
- Owner: Sealink (1987-1990); Wightlink (1990-2019)
- Operator: Sealink (1987-1990); Wightlink (1990-2019); Delcomar (2021-present)
- Port of registry: Portsmouth, United Kingdom
- Builder: Cochrane Shipbuilders, Selby
- Yard number: 135
- Launched: 4 November 1986
- In service: March 1987
- Identification: IMO number: 8518546; MMSI number: 235031617; Callsign: MFJT9
- Fate: Sold to Delcomar, Sardinia

General characteristics
- Tonnage: 2,968 GT
- Length: 77.05 metres (252.8 ft)
- Beam: 17.2 metres (56 ft)
- Draught: 2.48 metres (8 ft 2 in)
- Installed power: 3x 850bhp 6-cyl MAN 6ASL25 diesel engines
- Propulsion: 3x Voith Schneider cycloidal propellers
- Speed: 12.5 knots (23.2 km/h; 14.4 mph)
- Capacity: 771 passengers; 142 cars
- Crew: 10-12

MV St Cecilia is a vehicle and passenger ferry formerly operated by Wightlink on its route from Portsmouth to Fishbourne on the Isle of Wight, the route she took throughout her life.

St Cecilia was built by Cochrane Shipbuilders in Selby and was launched into the River Ouse. In March 1987, she began carrying passengers. In 2001 she appeared as a fictional "Norselink" ferry in a Gérard Depardieu film.

Her final voyage for Wightlink was on 25 January 2019, after which she joined her two older sisterships Anna Mur and GB Conte in Sardinia. She now operates linking Carloforte and Calasetta with the name Nando Murrau, operated by Delcomar.
