= MV St Helen =

Former Isle of Wight car and passenger ferry

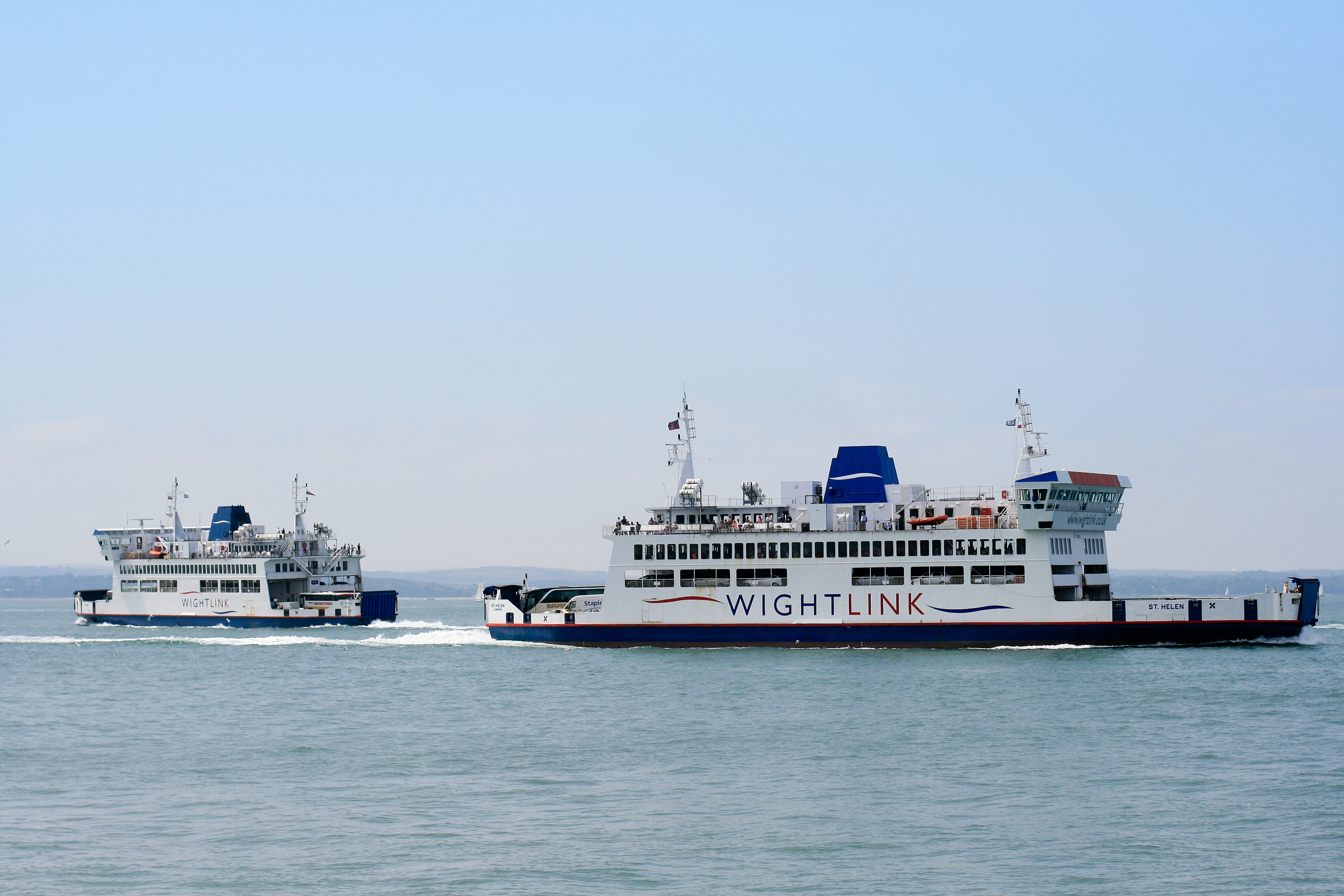
- MV St Helen (right) passes one of her sister ships, MV St Faith en route to Portsmouth Harbour from Fishbourne

History
- Name: MV St Helen (1983-2015); MV Anna Mur (2015 – present)
- Operator: Sealink 1983-1984; Sealink British Ferries 1984-1991; Wightlink 1991-2015; Delcomar Mar 2015 – present (Italy)
- Port of registry: 1983–2015: *London *2015–present: Cagliari
- Builder: Robb Caledon Shipbuilders, Leith
- Yard number: 535
- Launched: 15 September 1983
- In service: 28 November 1983
- Identification: IMO number: 8120569; Call sign: GDBB
- Status: In Service with Delcomar.

General characteristics
- Class & type: Car Passenger Ferry
- Tonnage: 2,983 GT
- Length: 77 metres (253 ft)
- Beam: 17.2 metres (56 ft)
- Draught: 2.48 metres (8 ft 2 in)
- Installed power: 3x 850bhp Harland & Wolff-MAN 6ASL25 diesel engines
- Propulsion: 3x Voith Schneider cycloidal propellers
- Speed: 12.5 knots (23.2 km/h; 14.4 mph)
- Capacity: 769 passengers; 142 cars; 12 Lorries

MV St Helen was a vehicle and passenger ferry operated by Wightlink on its route from Portsmouth to Fishbourne on the Isle of Wight. Due to her age, she was sold and was removed from service on 26 March 2015. She now operates in Sardinia with the name Anna Mur, operated by Delcomar, together with her sister ship GB Conte, the former MV St Catherine.

== History ==
St Helen was built by Robb Caledon Shipbuilders; the last ship to be launched from their Leith Shipyard. She entered service with Sealink on 28 November 1983 shortly after her sister St Catherine, She was positioned on the Portsmouth to Fishbourne route, the route she has taken through her life and was the largest Isle of Wight ferry until 1990 when MV St Faith was introduced measuring 26 gt more. This was a record held until 2001 when MV St Clare entered service.

== Deck collapse incident ==
The St Helen generated unwelcome headlines late on Friday 18 July 2014 at the Fishbourne ferry terminal, when a section of the mezzanine car deck with nine cars on board dropped about 6 ft (1.8 m) on to the deck below while being lowered. Three passengers and a crew member were injured and transferred to St Mary's Hospital in Newport. The Marine Accident Investigation Branch carried out an investigation.

The ship had just arrived on the 21:30 sailing from Portsmouth with 181 passengers and 11 crew on board. The next sailing, operated by St Clare, had to wait 90 minutes before being able to dock.

After the incident the St Helen was taken out of service for several weeks while Wightlink engineers removed the mezzanine deck leaving her sister ships St Clare, St Cecilia and St Faith to run the service.

== Sale to Delcomar ==
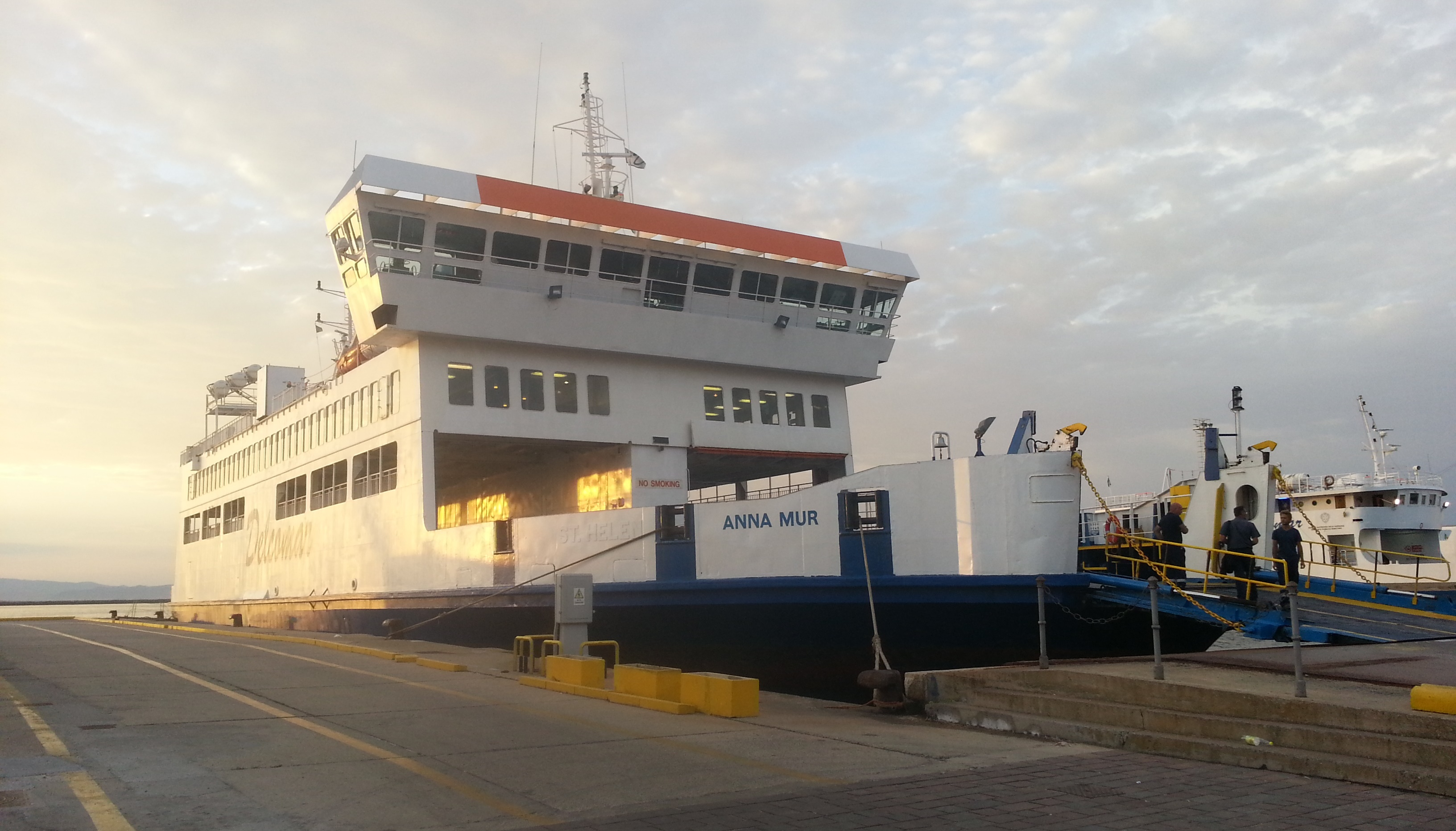
Anna Mur moored in Carloforte harbour (Isola di San Pietro, Sardinia)

After withdrawal from service, the ship was moored at Hythe, before being sold to Delcomar, Sardinia. She joined her sister ship St Catherine (now GB Conte), which was purchased by Delcomar in July 2010. Both ferries currently sail between the Isola di San Pietro and Portovesme; an approximately 40-minute service with a frequency of 17 ferries a day in each direction during the summer season. St Helen has been renamed Anna Mur.
