= MV Cenwulf =

Former Isle of Wight car and passenger ferry

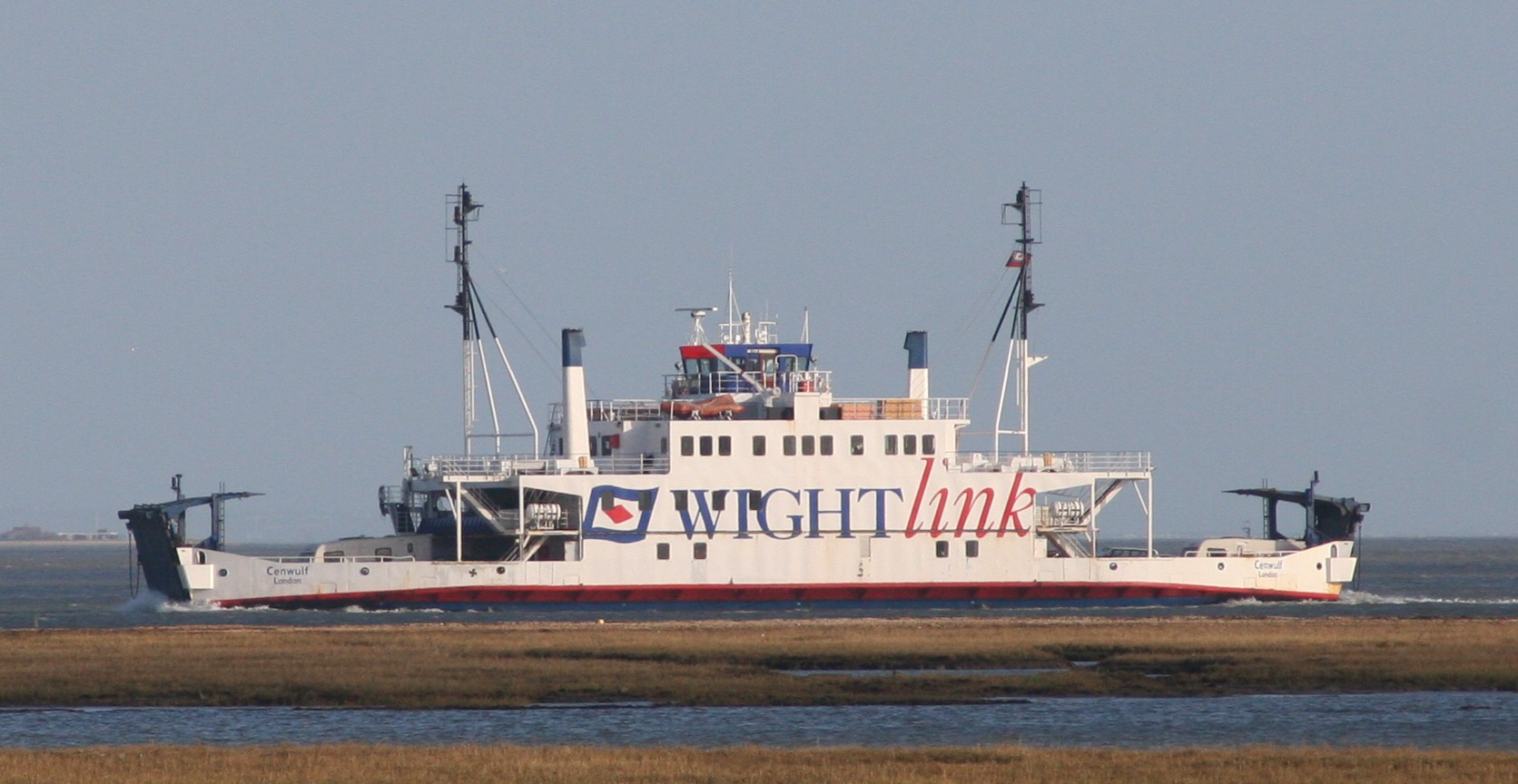
- MV Cenwulf

History

United Kingdom
- Name: MV Cenwulf
- Operator: Wightlink
- Builder: Robb Caledon Shipbuilders, Dundee
- Yard number: 561
- Launched: 1 June 1973
- Completed: July 1973
- In service: 1973
- Out of service: March 2009
- Identification: MMSI number: 235031615; IMO number: 7320021; Callsign: GTUQ
- Fate: Broken up 2010 in Esbjerg, Denmark

General characteristics
- Type: Car Passenger Ferry
- Tonnage: 761 GRT; 175 DWT
- Length: 58.00 m (190.3 ft)
- Beam: 15.7 m (51.5 ft)
- Draught: 2.28 m (7.5 ft)
- Propulsion: 2x 400bhp 6cyl Mirrlees Blackstone ERS6M turbocharged diesel engines driving Voith Schneider cycloidal propellers
- Speed: 10.00 knots
- Capacity: 512 passengers; 58 cars

MV Cenwulf was one of Wightlink's 'C' class vehicle and passenger ferries on their route from Lymington to Yarmouth on the Isle of Wight.

== History ==
Cenwulf was built in 1973 by Robb Caledon Shipbuilders in Dundee, Scotland, for Sealink Isle of Wight. The ship was named 'Cenwulf' after Coenwulf of Mercia, an Anglo-Saxon king of the Mercians from 796. Her maiden sailing was on 18 October 1973, when she replaced the 1938-built MV Lymington on the Lymington to Yarmouth route.

In 1990 ownership passed to Wightlink after the privatisation of Sealink in 1984.

Along with sister 'C' class ships MV Caedmon and MV Cenred operating the Lymington to Yarmouth ferry service, she was withdrawn with the introduction of the new Wight class ferries, Wight Light, Wight Sky and Wight Sun. Laid up at Marchwood in 2009,, Cenwulf was sold for scrapping. In March 2010 she was towed to Esbjerg, Denmark. A short time later, she was broken up.

== Layout ==
Above the car deck were passenger accommodation and navigation bridge. Fore and aft ramps allowed full ro-ro operation. In the late 1970s hydraulically operated mezzanine decks were fitted to increase her car capacity.

== Service ==
Cenwulf operated the Lymington to Yarmouth, Isle of Wight ferry service from 1973 to 2009, initially with sister ship Cenred and joined by Caedmon in 1983.
