= Wight Light =

Isle of Wight passenger and vehicle ferry

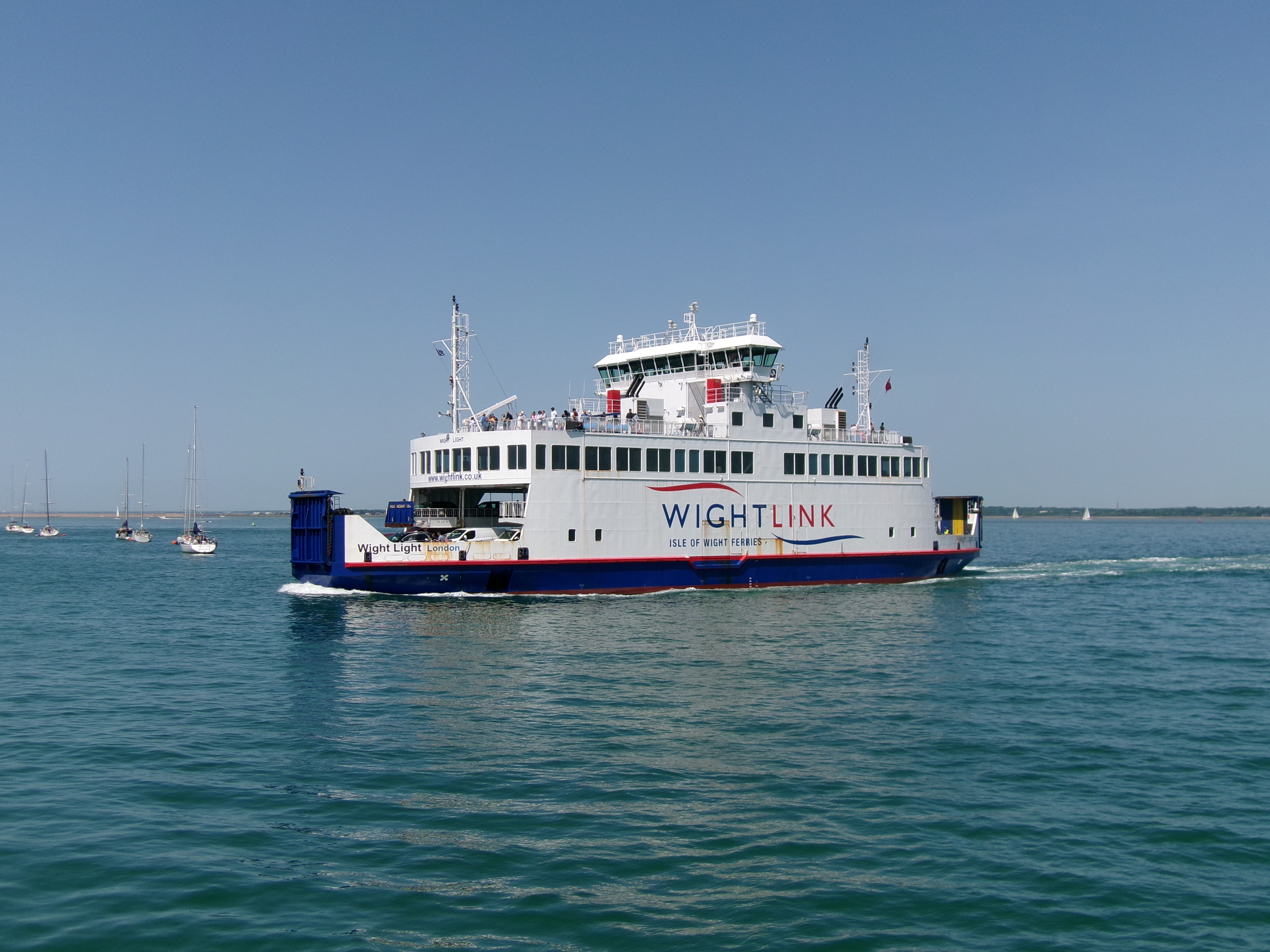

History

United Kingdom
- Name: Wight Light
- Owner: Wightlink 2009 present
- Operator: Wightlink
- Port of registry: London
- Route: Yarmouth to Lymington 25 February 2009 – 24 March 2015. 27 March 2015 – 1 April 15 (Portsmouth-Fishbourne) Replacement for retired St Helen 1 April 2015- present Yarmouth-Lymington.
- Builder: Kraljevica, Croatia
- Yard number: 550
- Launched: 26 January 2008
- In service: 25 February 2009
- Home port: London
- Identification: MMSI number: 235064784; IMO number: 9446972; Callsign: 2BBX5
- Status: In Service

General characteristics
- Class & type: W-Wight Class Roll-on/roll-off
- Tonnage: 2,546 GT; 360 DWT
- Displacement: 1,495 tonnes
- Length: 62.4 m (204.7 ft)
- Beam: 16.1 m (52.8 ft)
- Draught: 2.30 m (7.5 ft)
- Depth: 4.50 m (14.8 ft)
- Decks: Two Passenger and two car decks (One for cars & freight & one port side mezzanine for cars/vans only)
- Installed power: 4x 740 bhp (550 kW) Volvo Penta D16MH 16 litre 6cyl diesels
- Propulsion: 2 x Voith Schneider 21 R5/135 propeller units
- Speed: 11 knots (20 km/h; 13 mph)
- Capacity: 360 passengers, 65 cars, 110m of Freight Traffic
- Crew: 10

MV Wight Light is a car and passenger ferry built for the British ferry operator Wightlink. She is in service between mainland England and the Isle of Wight. She has a double end design so she doesn’t have to turn around considering she docks in narrow busy areas along with her sister ships Wight Sun and Wight Sky.

== History ==
Wight Light was designed by naval architects Hart Fenton & Company and constructed at the Kraljevica shipyard in Croatia. She was launched on 26 January 2008, the first of three vessels commissioned by Wightlink to replace their ageing ferries Caedmon, Cenred and Cenwulf on the Yarmouth to Lymington route. Her sister ships are Wight Sky and Wight Sun, both of which are now in service.

Wight Light was due to be delivered in late August 2008 arriving in Lymington late on 1 September 2008. She entered service on 25 February 2009.

== Service ==
Wight Light is in service between Yarmouth and Lymington. On 12 March 2009 Wight Light was taken out of service for repairs to her hydraulic ramp. 35-year-old Cenred was brought back from retirement.

On 24 November 2014, Wightlink announced that they were going to change the way they configure their fleet in response to both falling demand on their Western Solent Lymington-Yarmouth ferry service and the need to find a replacement for their oldest vessel in their fleet, St Helen. It was decided to transfer the Wight Light to the Portsmouth-Fishbourne route to replace the St Helen. Both sea and berthing trials were carried out in January–February and March 2015, allowing for the first commercial sailing of Wight Light on the Portsmouth-Fishbourne service on Friday 27 March 2015. Wight Light has since returned to operating the Yarmouth-Lymington route.
