= MV St Catherine =

Former Isle of Wight car and passenger ferry

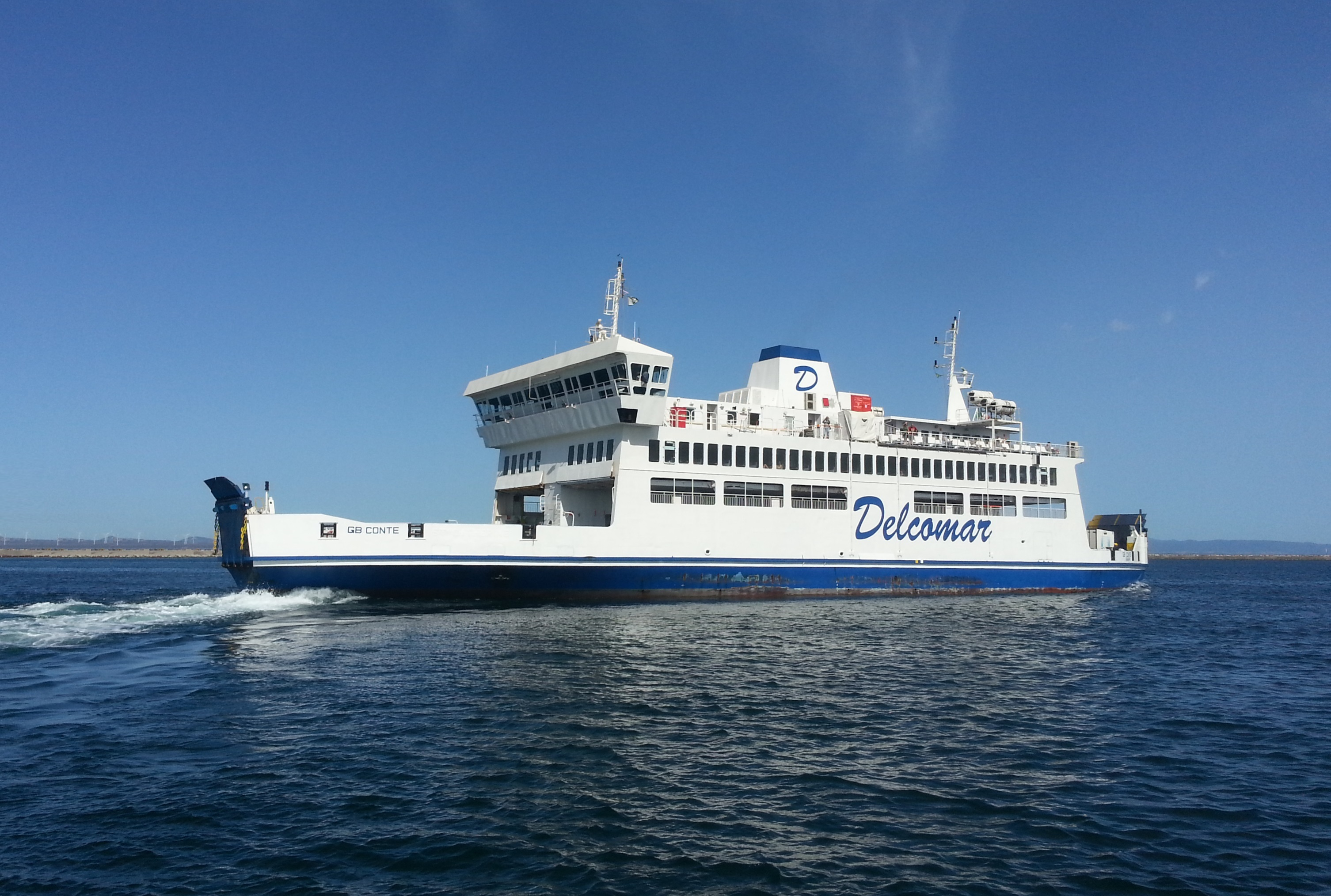
- GB Conte departing from Carloforte harbour.

History
- Name: 1983–2010: St Catherine; 2010–present: GB Conte
- Operator: 1983–2010: Wightlink; 2010–present (Italy) Delcomar
- Port of registry: 1983–2010: London; 2010–present: Cagliari
- Builder: Robb Caledon Shipbuilders, Leith
- Cost: £5 million
- Yard number: 534
- Launched: 30 March 1983
- Completed: 1983
- In service: 3 July 1983
- Identification: IMO number: 8120557; MMSI Number: 247294300 (was 235031616); Callsign: ICFZ (was GCZV)
- Status: In Service

General characteristics
- Class & type: Roll-on/roll-off car ferry
- Tonnage: 2,036 GT; 576 DWT
- Length: 77.05 m (252.8 ft)
- Beam: 17.22 m (56.5 ft)
- Draught: 2.48 m
- Installed power: 3x 850bhp Harland & Wolff-MAN 6ASL25/30 diesel engines driving Voith Schneider cycloidal propellers
- Speed: 12.5 knots (23.2 km/h; 14.4 mph)
- Capacity: 771 passengers; 142 cars

MV St Catherine is a Roll-on/roll-off car and passenger ferry. She served the Wightlink crossing from Portsmouth to Fishbourne, Isle of Wight from 1983 to 2009. In 2010, she was sold to Delcomar and renamed GB Conte.

== History ==
St Catherine was built by Robb Caledon Shipbuilders of Leith at a cost of £5 million. When she entered service on 3 July 1983, she was the biggest ferry ever in the Sealink Isle of Wight fleet, and the first able to carry more than 100 cars. Local papers reported that she made the other Isle of Wight ferries looked like toys in comparison. St Catherine remained the largest ship in the fleet only until sister ship, St Helen entered service later in 1983.

In 2001 the ferry was used as a location for the Robbie Williams single “Road to Mandalay”. The video was filmed during a night crossing with no other passengers aboard.

St Catherine was present at the International Fleet Review in 2005, representing Wightlink with a number of her sisters. She was later laid up at Hythe in Hampshire.

In 2010 St Catherine was sold to Delcomar and sailed from Hythe to Sardinia as GB Conte on 31 July 2010, with a crew of 11 on board. In March 2015, it was announced that sisters St Catherine and St Helen were being reunited, after spending five years apart, when St Helen was purchased by Delcomar.

== Layout ==
St Catherine was the first of the Isle of Wight ferries to use a Voith Schneider asymmetric three-propeller layout with a bridge mounted forward. Two decks of passenger accommodation are provided above the car deck, with two bar areas and seating space. One of the fastest car ferries in the company at the time, she allowed Wightlink to provide a 35-minute crossing of the Solent. Two older ferries on the route were withdrawn from service, while another, Caedmon was transferred to join her sisters on the Lymington to Yarmouth route.

== Service ==
St Catherine entered service with Sealink in 1983; the company becoming Wightlink in 1991. She sailed between Portsmouth, on the English mainland and Fishbourne, Isle of Wight until 2009. GB Conte and Anna Mur currently sail between the Isola di San Pietro and Portovesme; an approximately 40-minute service with a frequency of 17 ferries a day in each direction during the summer season.
