= Wightlink =

Ferry company operating routes between Hampshire and the Isle of Wight

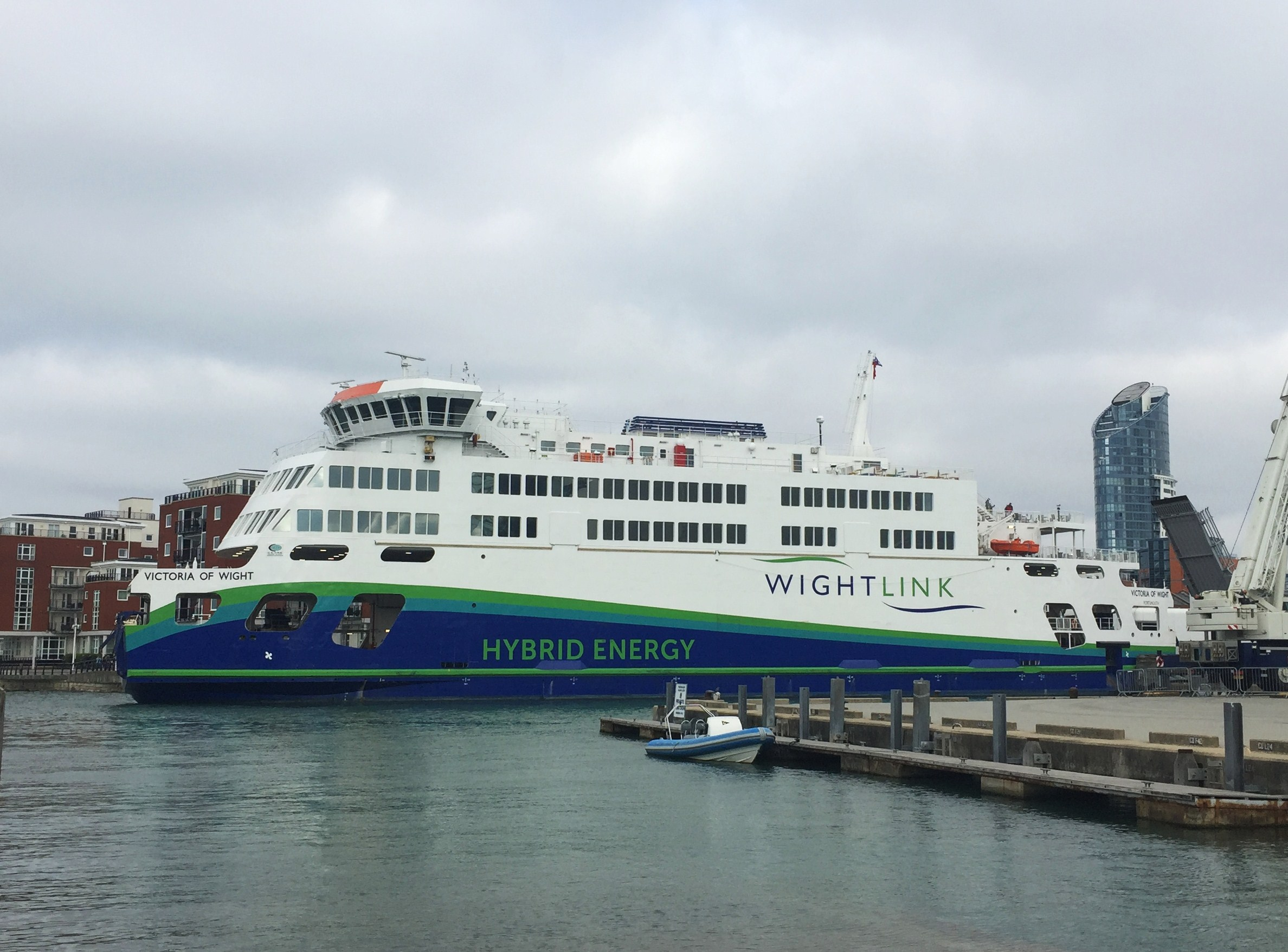
- Wightlink's hybrid ferry Victoria of Wight at Portsmouth Harbour, 25 October 2018
- Type: Limited Company
- Industry: Shipping
- Headquarters: Portsmouth, Hampshire, England
- Area served: Hampshire; Isle of Wight
- Revenue: £71 million (2022)
- Operating income: £28 million (2022)
- Net income: £19 million (2022)
- Parent: Basalt Infrastructure Partners (50%); Fiera Infrastructure (50%)
- Website: www.wightlink.co.uk

Wightlink is a ferry company operating routes across The Solent between Hampshire and the Isle of Wight in the south of England. It operates car ferries between Lymington and Yarmouth, and Portsmouth and Fishbourne and a fast passenger-only catamaran between Portsmouth Harbour and Ryde Pier. It is jointly owned by Basalt Infrastructure Partners and Fiera Infrastructure.

== History ==
Wightlink's House Flag

Wightlink and its forerunners have provided ferry services to and from the Isle of Wight for more than 160 years. In the early 19th century, ferries ran to the island from Lymington and Portsmouth. Later, steam ferries operated a circular route around Lymington, Yarmouth, Cowes, Ryde and Portsmouth. When the railway companies became involved, they concentrated on two direct routes, Lymington to Yarmouth and Portsmouth to Ryde. Operation of the ferries was eventually moved under a separate subsidiary of the British Railways Board called Sealink.

In 1984 Sealink was sold to Sea Containers. When Stena Line bought Sealink in 1990, the Isle of Wight ferries remained with Sea Containers, as Wightlink. In June 1995 Wightlink was the subject of a management buyout. In 2005 it was bought by the Macquarie European Infrastructure Fund.

In 2005, a Wightlink car ferry featured briefly in the film Fragile starring Calista Flockhart. The ferry is shown very briefly in a wide-angle shot. Closer shots used Red Funnel's Red Osprey.

In October 2006 Wightlink announced its intention to build two new ferries for the Yarmouth to Lymington route. These ships are slightly bigger than their predecessors, with extra vehicle space, but only accommodate 360 passengers compared to 500 on the older vessels. Wightlink later announced that a third new ferry would enter service in spring 2009. A dispute with some Lymington residents led to delay and threatened the viability of the route. In November 2008, the service was reduced so only two ships were required, allowing for the delay in the introduction of the new vessels. Sea trials were not complete by November 2008 and introduction became pressing with the expiry of safety certificates on the previous fleet. Wightlink proposed interim arrangements enabling them restricted use of the new ferries until the trials could be completed in full.

The previous Wightlink logo, replaced at around the time the new ferries were arriving.

In March 2008 Wightlink revealed that an order had been placed with FBMA Marine to construct two new passenger catamarans for the Portsmouth to Ryde service, to replace the three craft currently employed. They entered service in 2009.

From May 2008 Wightlink introduced a fuel surcharge on all crossings, linked to the price of Brent Crude oil. However, in November 2008 the surcharge dropped to zero following the sharp drop in crude prices during the 2008 financial crisis and as of November 2009 was still at zero.

Wightlink planned to spend £17.5 million on improving its Portsmouth to Fishbourne route. This involved remodelling the terminal facilities at both Fishbourne and Portsmouth. The flagship St Clare was to have its upper car deck adjusted so vehicles access it directly from on-shore ramps. Two of the older ferries were to be stretched in length by 12 metres, with upper car decks similar to St Clare's being added, replacing movable mezzanine decks. Of the remaining two ferries, St Catherine has been sold and St Helen was used mainly for freight until she too was sold. As part of this investment project the reservations and ticketing system was replaced by CarRes from Carus.

On 16 February 2015, Wightlink was sold by the Macquarie European Infrastructure Fund to Balfour Beatty Infrastructure Partners (BBIP). On 15 May 2015, Wightlink announced a revised investment of £45 million to include the purchase a new ferry, upgrading St Clare and modifications to the terminals at both ends to facilitate double-deck loading.

In July 2016, Balfour Beatty exited BBIP, which became Basalt Infrastructure Partners.

In August 2017, Wightlink announced that a new vehicle ferry, Victoria of Wight, would be built for the Portsmouth to Fishbourne service. It entered service on 26 August 2018. In May 2019, BBIP sold a 50% stake in the business to Fiera Infrastructure of Canada.

== Current fleet ==
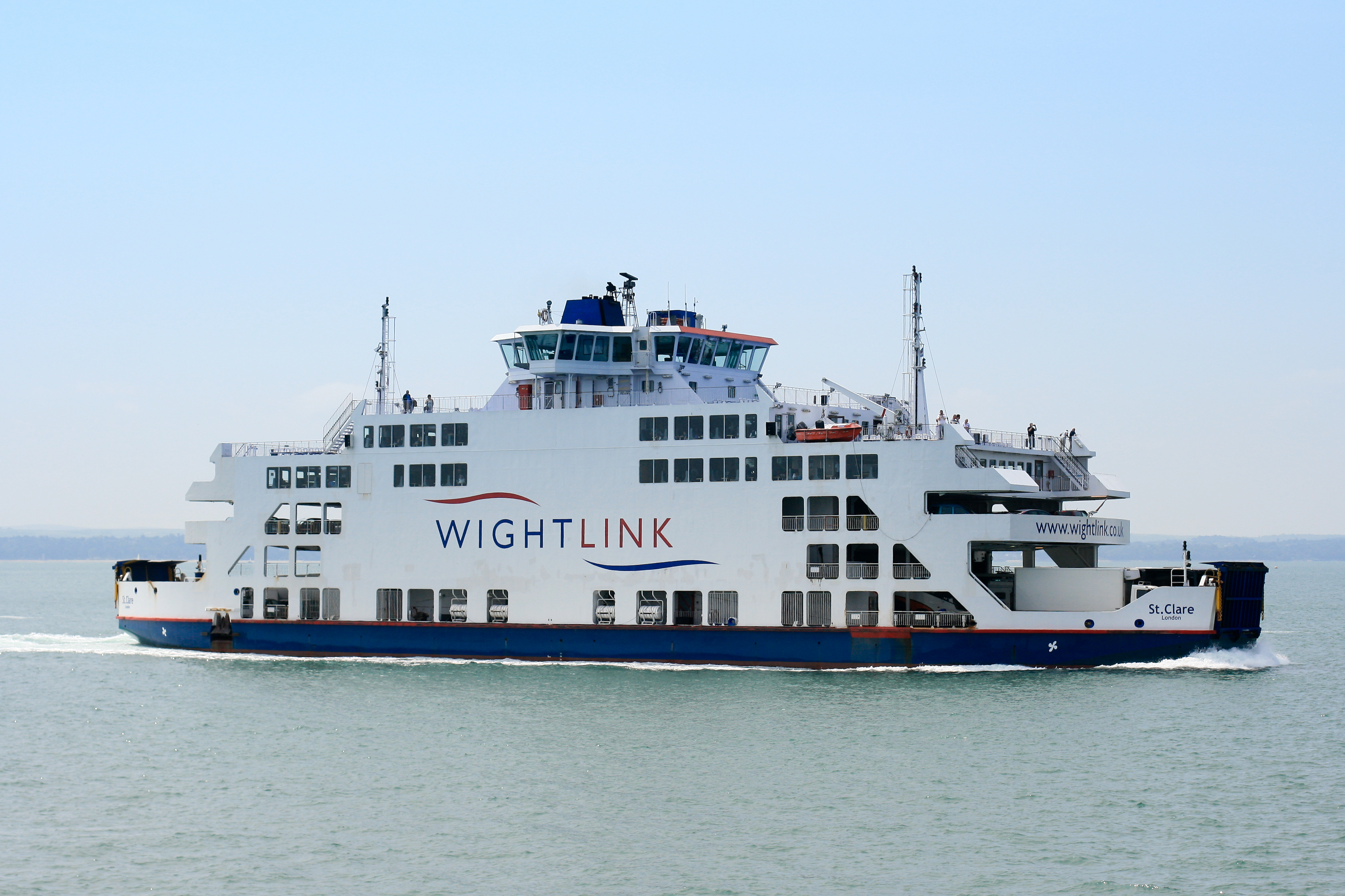
St Clare, July 2013.

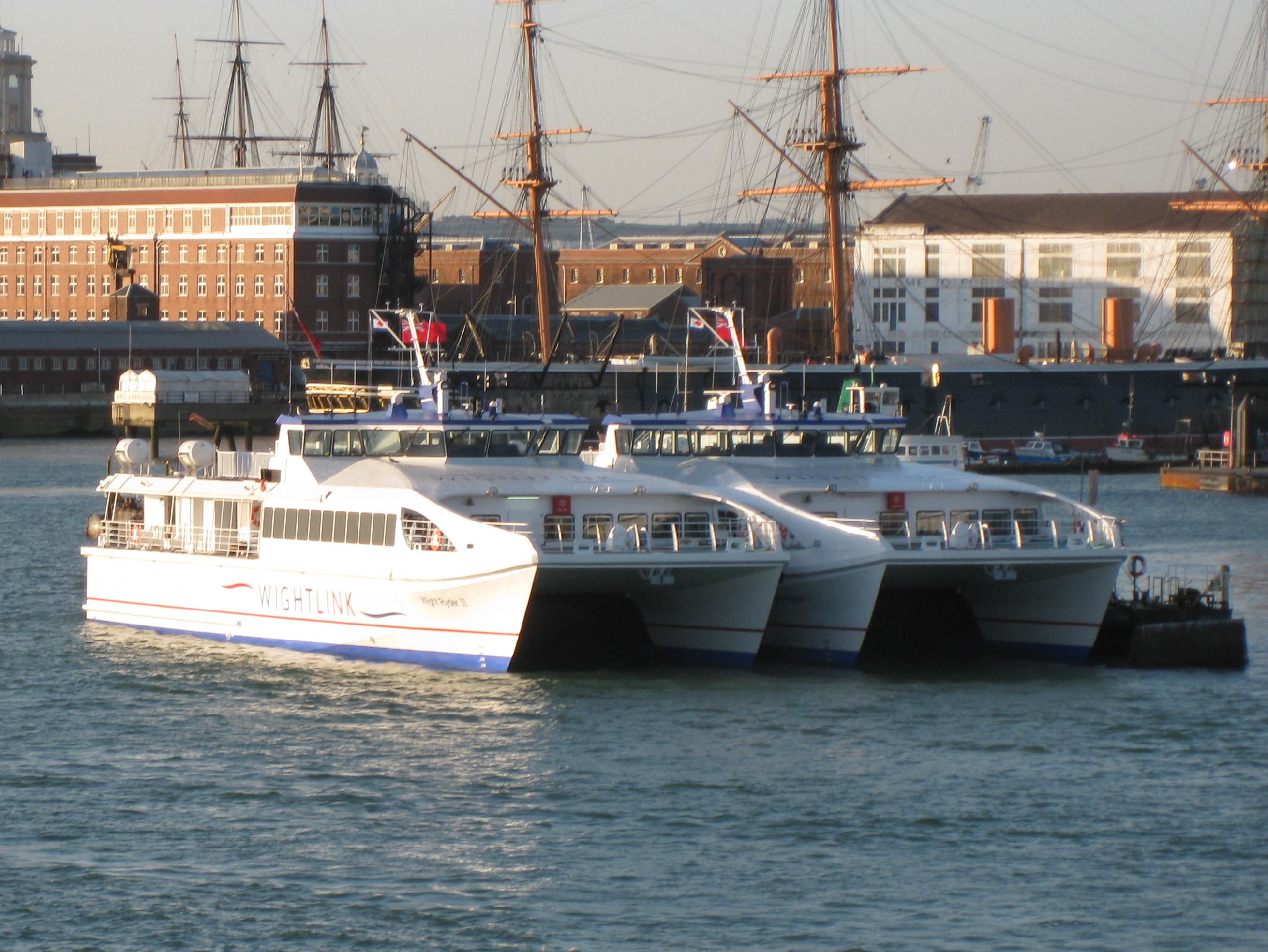
Wight Ryder I and Wight Ryder II at Portsmouth Harbour in August 2009 prior to entry into service

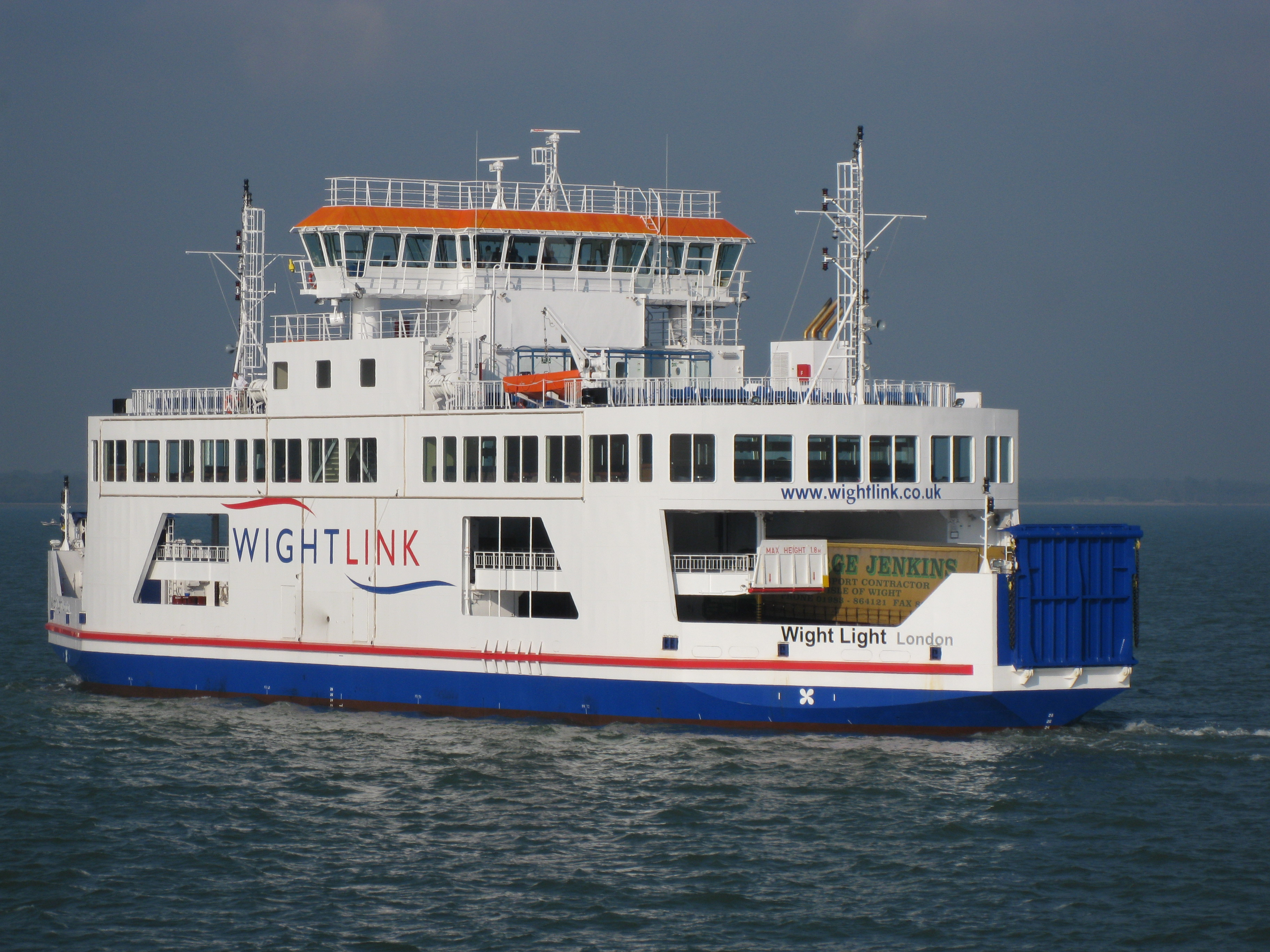
Wight Light, the first of the new ferries launched in 2008 for the Lymington to Yarmouth route, undertaking sea trials prior to delivery

=== Vehicle ferries ===
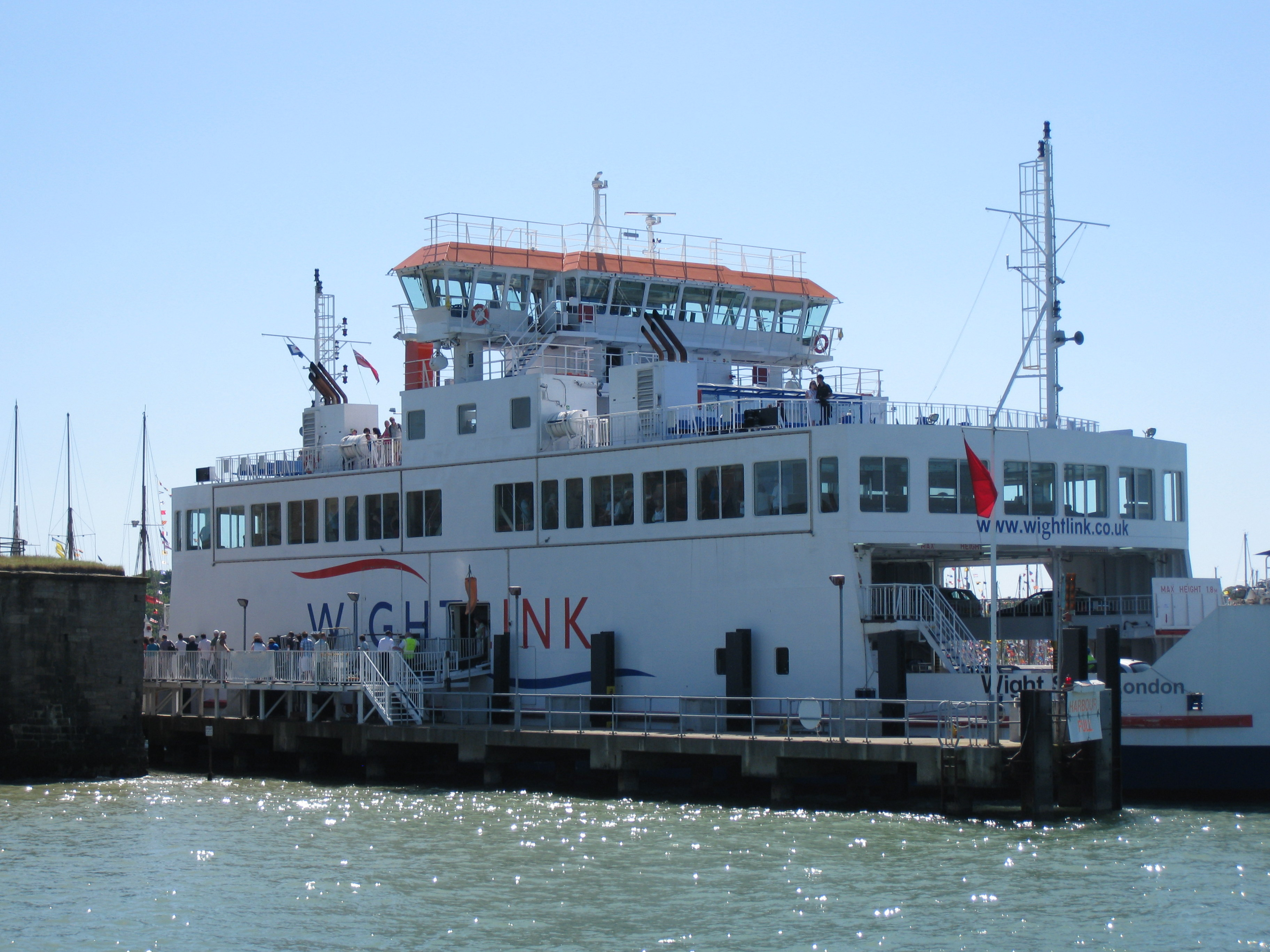
Wight Sky at Yarmouth Harbour

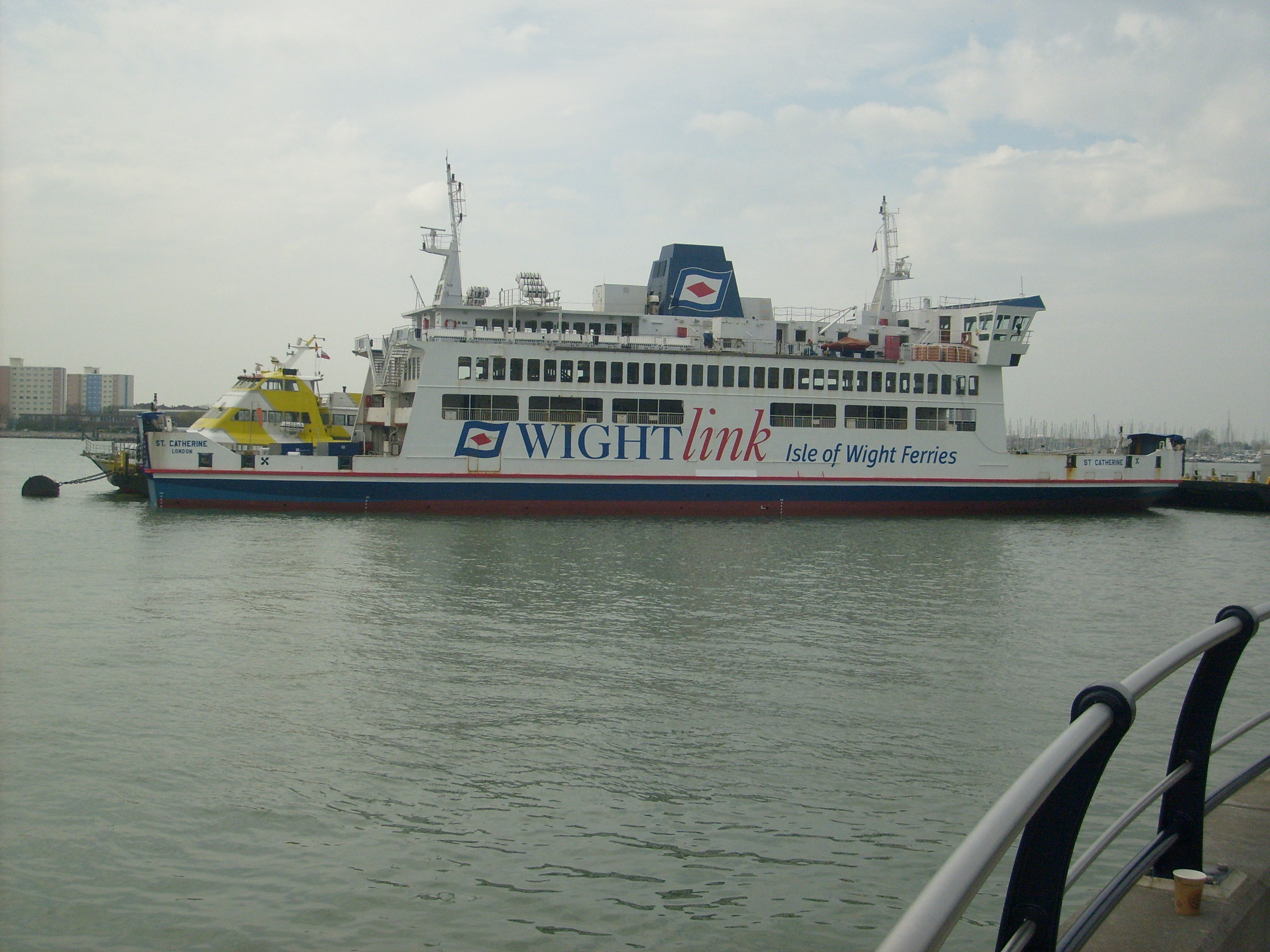
Wightlink's former St Catherine

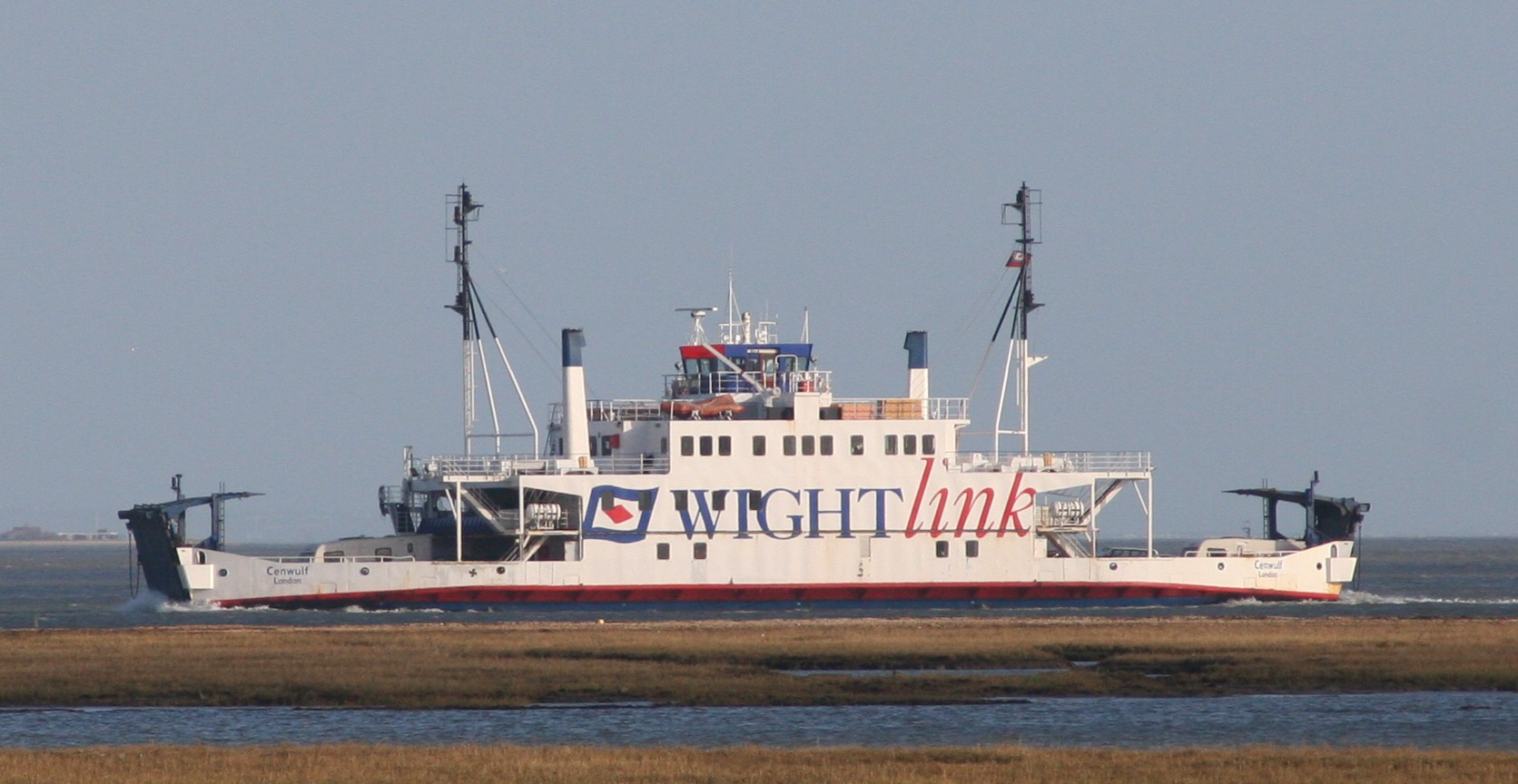
Cenwulf, one of the former Lymington – Yarmouth ferries

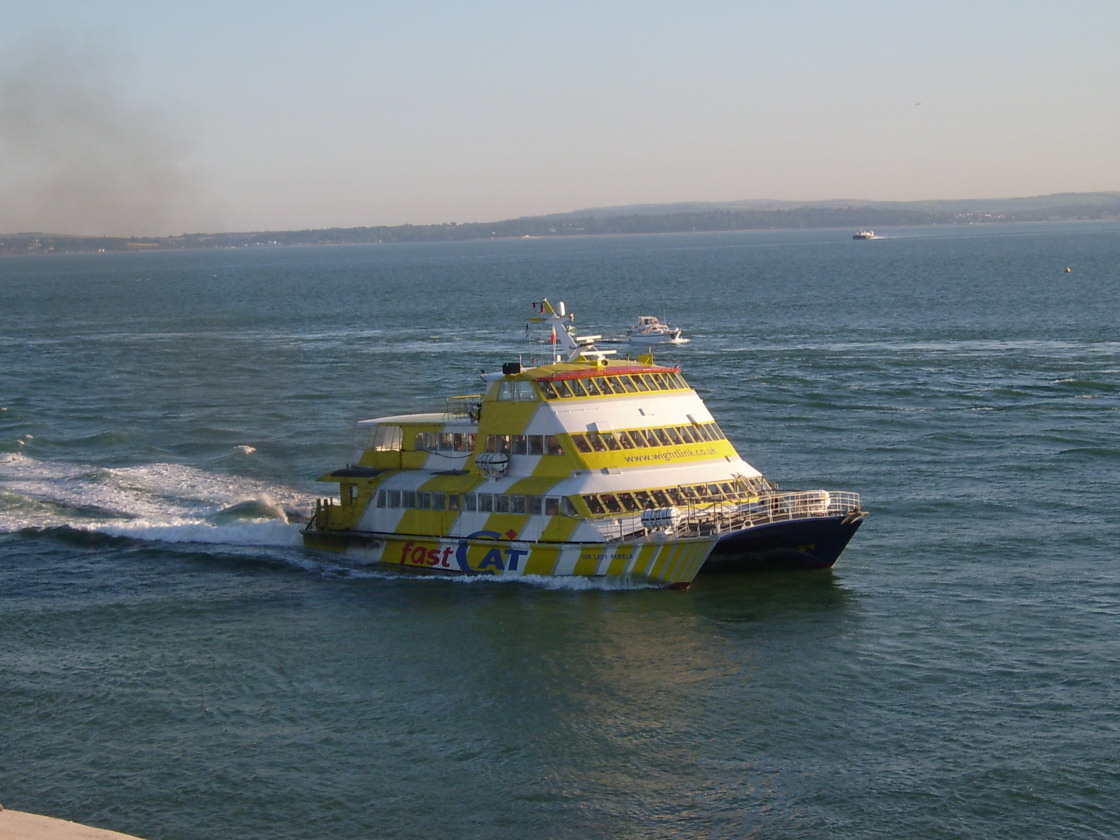
Our Lady Pamela crossing the Solent

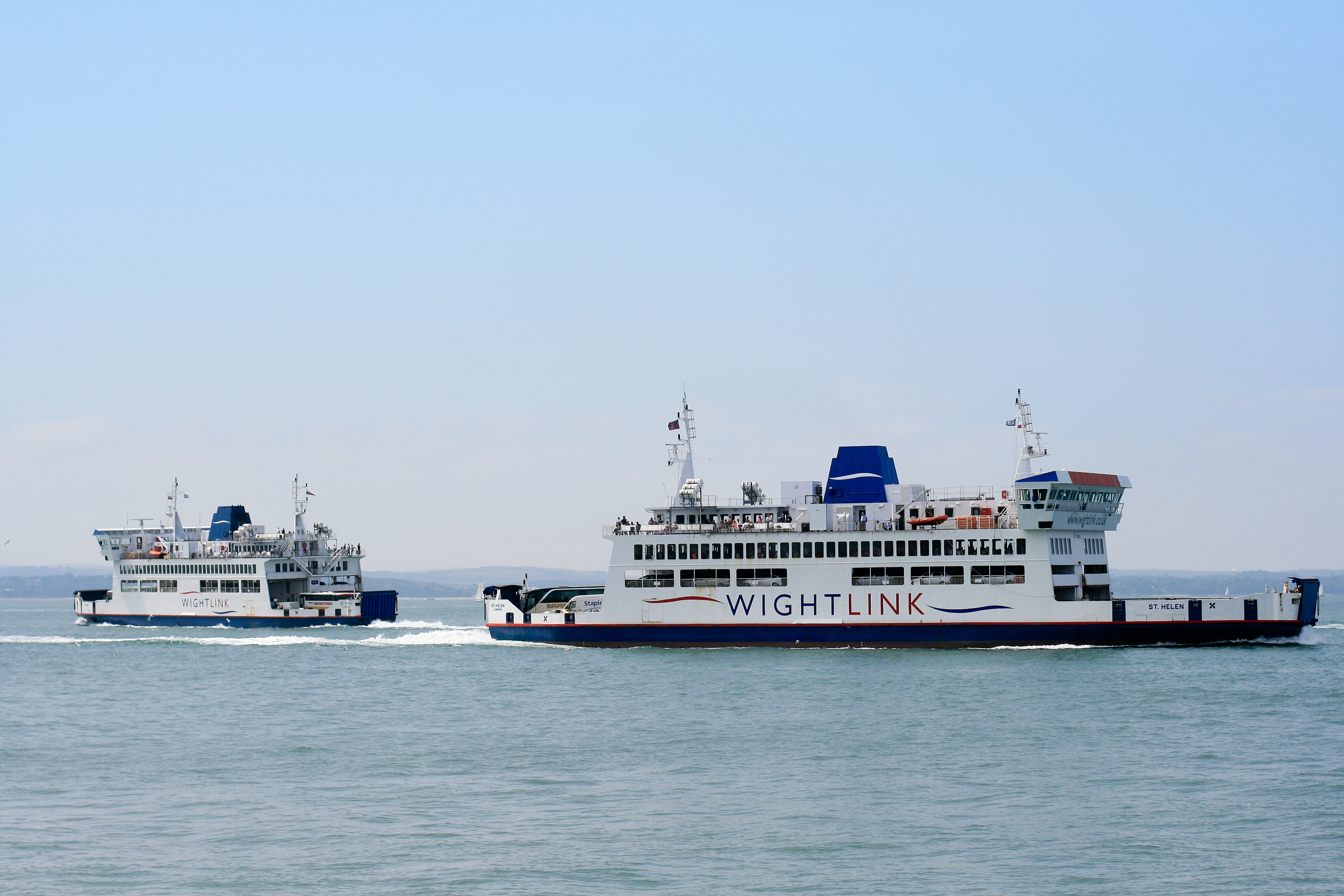
St Helen in foreground, and St Faith, 2013

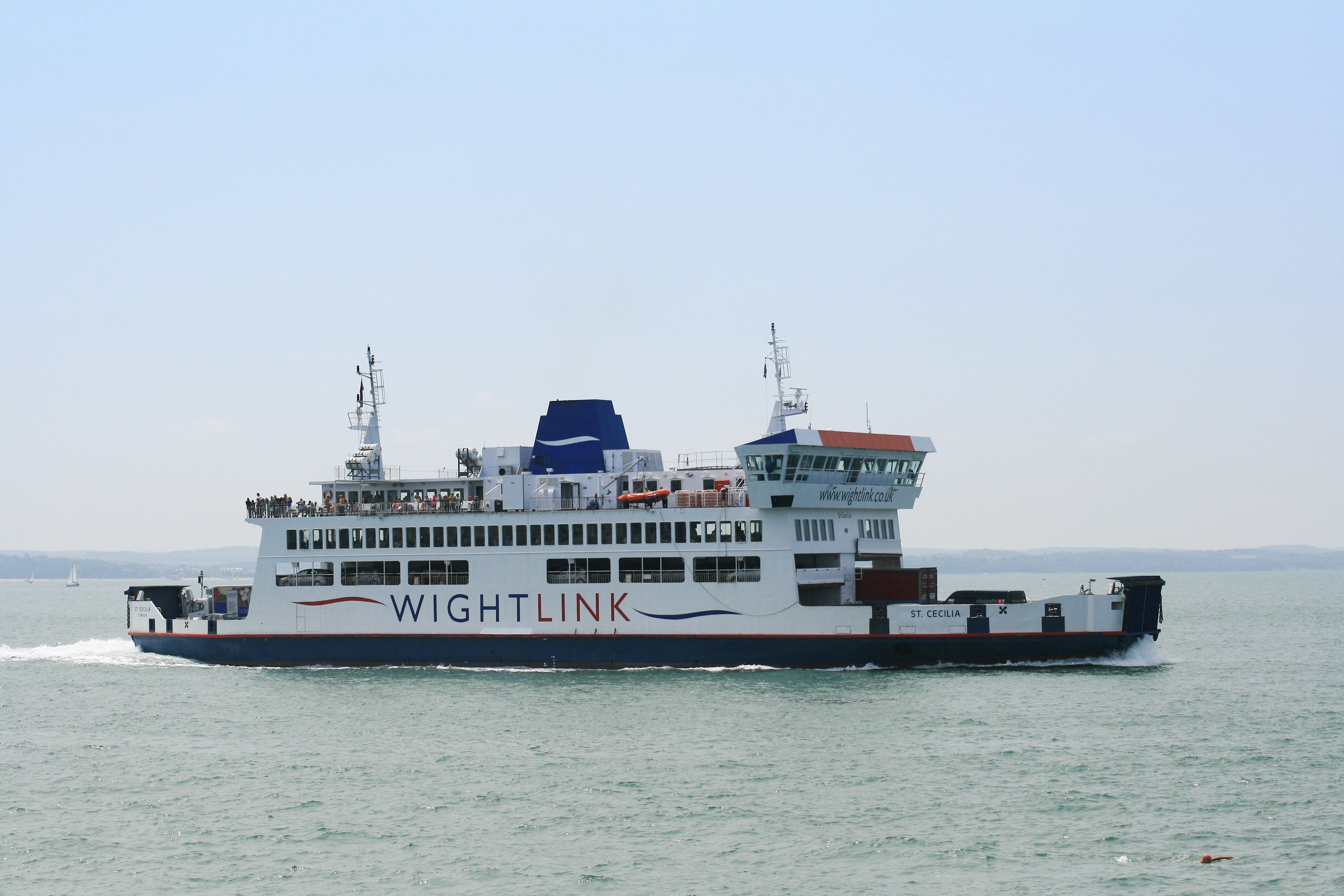
St Cecilia, July 2013

Ferry	Entered service	Route
MV St Faith	1990	Portsmouth to Fishbourne
MV St Clare	2001	Portsmouth to Fishbourne
Victoria of Wight	2018	Portsmouth to Fishbourne
Wight Sun	2009	Lymington to Yarmouth
Wight Light	2009	Lymington to Yarmouth
Wight Sky	2009	Lymington to Yarmouth

The introduction of the Wight class ferries was a much-discussed affair, with some Lymington residents claiming that the increased size of the ferries posed a risk, both in environmental terms and to users of pleasure craft on the Lymington river.

=== High-speed craft ===
Catamaran	Entered service	Route
Wight Ryder I	2009	Portsmouth to Ryde
Wight Ryder II	2009	Portsmouth to Ryde

== Historic fleet ==
The following ferries have operated historically on routes run by Wightlink or previous companies that have been absorbed by Wightlink.

=== Lymington-Yarmouth ===
Ship	Service	Company	Notes
PS Glasgow	1830–1850	Solent Steam Packet Co	
PS Red Lion	1858–1880	Solent Steam Packet Co	
PS Solent	1841–1861	Solent Steam Packet Co	
PS Solent	1863 –1901	Solent Steam Packet Co	
PS Mayflower	1866	Solent Steam Packet Co	
PS Lymington	1893	London and South Western Railway	
PS Solent	1902	London and South Western Railway	
PS Freshwater	1927-1959	Southern Railway	Sold and renamed Sussex Queen, renamed Swanage Queen
MV Lymington	1938–1973	Southern Railway	First Voith Schneider driven ferry. Sold and renamed Sound of Sanda
PMV Farringford	1948–1974	British Transport Commission	
MV Freshwater	1959–1983	British Transport Commission	2x 320bhp 8cyl Crossley diesels
MV Cenwulf	1973–2009	Wightlink	Scrapped 2010
MV Cenred	1974–2009	Wightlink	Scrapped 2010
MV Caedmon	1983–2009	Wightlink	Scrapped 2010

=== Portsmouth-Ryde ===
Ship	Service	Company	Notes
PS Arrow	1825–1851	Portsmouth & Ryde Steam Packet Co	
PS Union	1825	Portsmouth & Ryde Steam Packet Co	
PS Lord Yarborough	1826–1851	Portsmouth & Ryde Steam Packet Co	
PS Lord Spencer	1833		
PS Prince Albert	1847–1868	Portsmouth & Ryde Steam Packet Co	
PS Prince of Wales	1850	Portsea, Portsmouth, Gosport & Isle of Wight Steam Packet Co	
PS Princess Royal	1850	Portsea, Portsmouth, Gosport & Isle of Wight Steam Packet Co	
PS Her Majesty	1850-1883	Portsmouth & Ryde Steam Packet Co	
PS Prince Consort	1859–1882	Port of Portsmouth & Ryde United Steam Packet Co	
PS Princess of Wales	1865–1885	Port of Portsmouth & Ryde United Steam Packet Co	
PS Duke of Edinburgh	1869–1884	Port of Portsmouth & Ryde United Steam Packet Co	
PS Princess Alice	1869–1882	Port of Portsmouth & Ryde United Steam Packet Co	
PS Ventnor	1873–1879	Southsea & Isle of Wight Steam Packet Co	
PS Shanklin	1873–1879	Southsea & Isle of Wight Steam Packet Co	
PS Ryde	1873–1879	Southsea & Isle of Wight Steam Packet Co	
PS Southsea	1873–1879	Southsea & Isle of Wight Steam Packet Co	
SS Princess Louise	1873–1874	Port of Portsmouth & Ryde United Steam Packet Co	
SS Princess Beatrice	1874-1874	Port of Portsmouth & Ryde United Steam Packet Co	
PS Heather Bell	1875	Port of Portsmouth & Ryde United Steam Packet Co	
PS Albert Edward	1878	Port of Portsmouth & Ryde United Steam Packet Co	
PS Alexandra	1879–1913	Port of Portsmouth & Ryde United Steam Packet Co	Sold to Cosens & Co Ltd
PS Victoria	1881–1899	Joint Railway Companies Steampacket Service	
PS Duchess of Edinburgh	1884–1910	Joint Railway Companies Steampacket Service	
PS Duchess of Connaught	1884–1910	Joint Railway Companies Steampacket Service	
PS Duchess of Albany	1890–1927	Joint Railway Companies Steampacket Service	
PS Princess Margaret	1893–1927	Joint Railway Companies Steampacket Service	
PS Duchess of Kent	1897–1933	Joint Railway Companies Steampacket Service	Sold and renamed Clacton Queen
PS Duchess of Fife	1890–1929	Joint Railway Companies Steampacket Service	
PS Duchess of Richmond	1910–1915	Joint Railway Companies Steampacket Service	Mined in the Mediterranean
PS Duchess of Norfolk	1911–1937	Joint Railway Companies Steampacket Service	Sold and renamed Embassy. Scrapped June 1967
PS Shanklin	1924–1950	Southern Railway	Sold and renamed Monarch
PS Merstone	1928–1952	Southern Railway	
PS Portsdown	1928–1941	Southern Railway	Mined off Southsea
PS Southsea	1930–1941	Southern Railway	J113 HMS Southsea mined off the River Tyne
PS Whippingham	1930–1962	Southern Railway	J136 HMS Whippingham in WW2
PS Sandown	1934–1965	Southern Railway	J20 HMS Sandown in WW2, evacuated 3,000 men at Dunkirk
PS Ryde	1937–1969	Southern Railway	J132 HMS Ryde in WW2, Sold for use as a floating hotel and later a nightclub. Subsequent attempts at preservation finally failed in 2018.
TSMV Brading	1948–1986	British Transport Commission	
TSMV Southsea	1948–1988	British Transport Commission	Acquired for preservation, ultimately unsuccessful. Scrapped 2005.
TSMV Shanklin	1951–1980	British Transport Commission	Sold and renamed Prince Ivanhoe. Holed and beached in 1981. Scrapped in 1984.
Our Lady Patricia	1986–2006	Wightlink	Scrapped 2006
Our Lady Pamela	1986–2008	Wightlink	Scrapped 2008
FastCat Shanklin	1996–2009	Wightlink	Sold and renamed Sochi 2
FastCat Ryde	1996–2010	Wightlink	Sold and renamed Rapparee, resold and renamed Sochi 1

=== Portsmouth-Fishbourne ===
Ship	Service	Company	Notes
MV Fishbourne	1927–1961	Southern Railway	Sent to Dunkirk in 1940, 2x 120bhp Gardner 4T7 semi diesels
MV Wootton	1928–1961	Southern Railway	Sent to Dunkirk in 1940, 2x 120bhp Gardner 4T7 semi diesels
MV Hilsea	1930–1961	Southern Railway	2x 120bhp Gardner 4T7 semi diesels
MV Fishbourne	1961–1983	British Transport Commission	IMO5115587, 2x 320bhp 8cyl Crossley diesels
MV Camber Queen	1961–1984	British Transport Commission	2x 320bhp 8cyl Crossley diesels
MV Cuthred	1969–1986	Wightlink	Sold and renamed Mira Praia
MV Caedmon	1973–1983	Wightlink	Transferred to Lymington - Yarmouth route. Scrapped 2010
MV St Catherine	1983–2010	Wightlink	Sold to Delcomar, Sardinia and renamed GB Conte
MV St Helen	1983–2015	Wightlink	Sold to Delcomar, Sardinia and renamed Anna Mur
MV St Cecilia	1987–2019	Wightlink	Sold to Delcomar, Sardinia and renamed Nando Murrau

=== Langstone Harbour-Bembridge ===
Ship	Service	Company	Notes
TF Carrier	1885–1888	Isle of Wight Marine Transit Co	Ex Firth of Tay train ferry. Scrapped 1888 due to being ill-suited for the Solent
