= Wight Sun =

Isle of Wight passenger and vehicle ferry

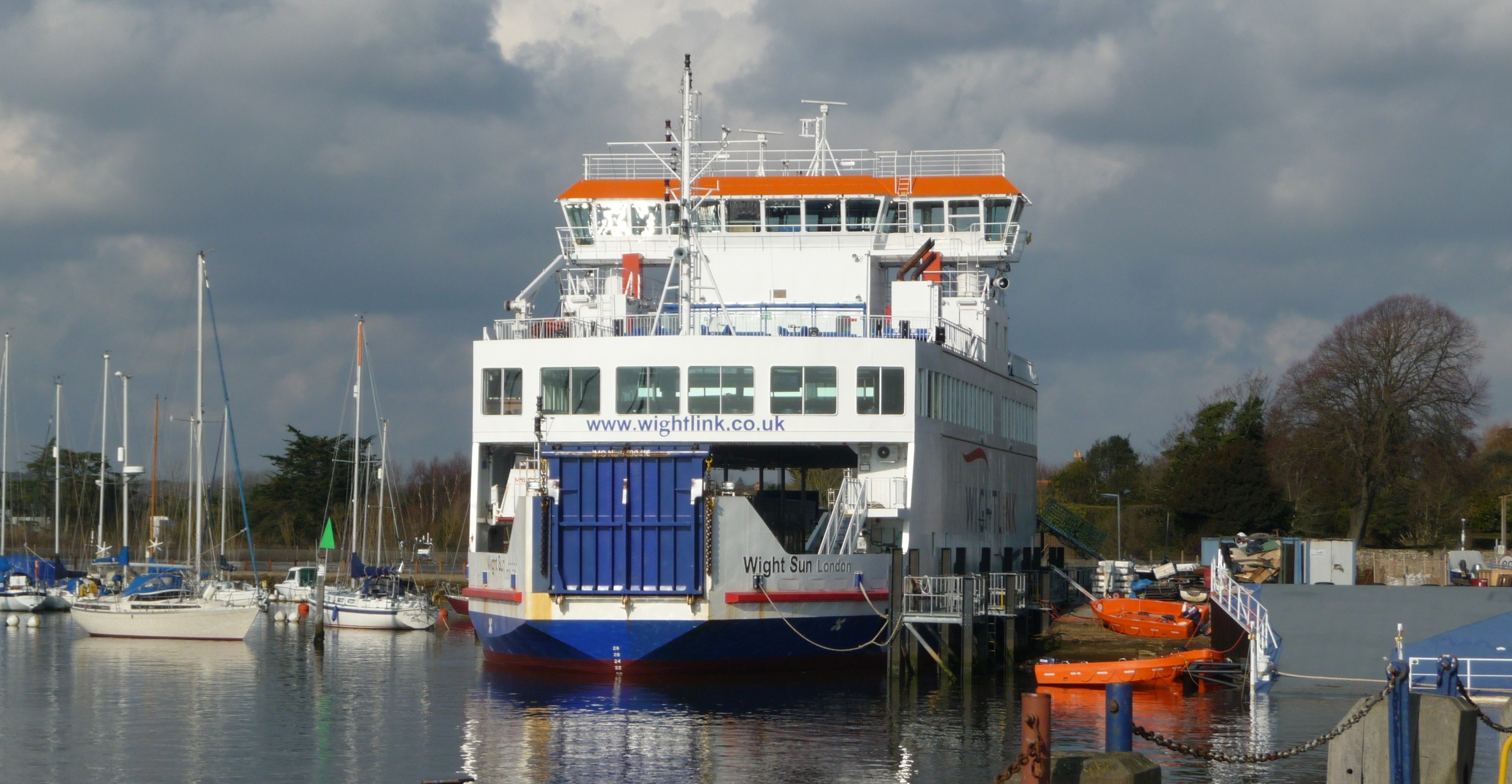
- Wight Sun berthed at Lymington

History

United Kingdom
- Name: Wight Sun
- Operator: Wightlink
- Route: Yarmouth to Lymington Portsmouth~Fishbourne (Seasonal relief vessel 2015 onwards)
- Builder: Kraljevica, Croatia
- Yard number: 552
- Launched: 29 June 2008
- Christened: by local schoolgirl Stefani Nadoh
- In service: 25 May 2009
- Home port: London
- Identification: IMO number: 9490416; MMSI number: 235064777; Callsign: 2BBW9
- Status: In service

General characteristics
- Tonnage: 2,546 GT; 360 DWT
- Length: 62.0 m (203.4 ft)
- Beam: 16.0 m (52.5 ft)
- Draught: 2.3 m (7.5 ft)
- Installed power: 4x 740bhp (552kw) Volvo Penta D16MH 16 litre 6cyl diesels
- Propulsion: 2x Voith Schneider 21 R5/135
- Speed: 11 knots (20 km/h; 13 mph)
- Capacity: 360 passengers, 65 cars
- Crew: 10

Wight Sun is an Isle of Wight ferry built in 2008 for the British company Wightlink.

== History ==
Wight Sun was built at the Brodogradiliste Kraljevica, Croatia and launched on 29 June 2008. After fitting out, she sailed the 3,071 miles to Lymington in March/April 2009 and entered service with Wightlink in spring 2009.

== Service ==
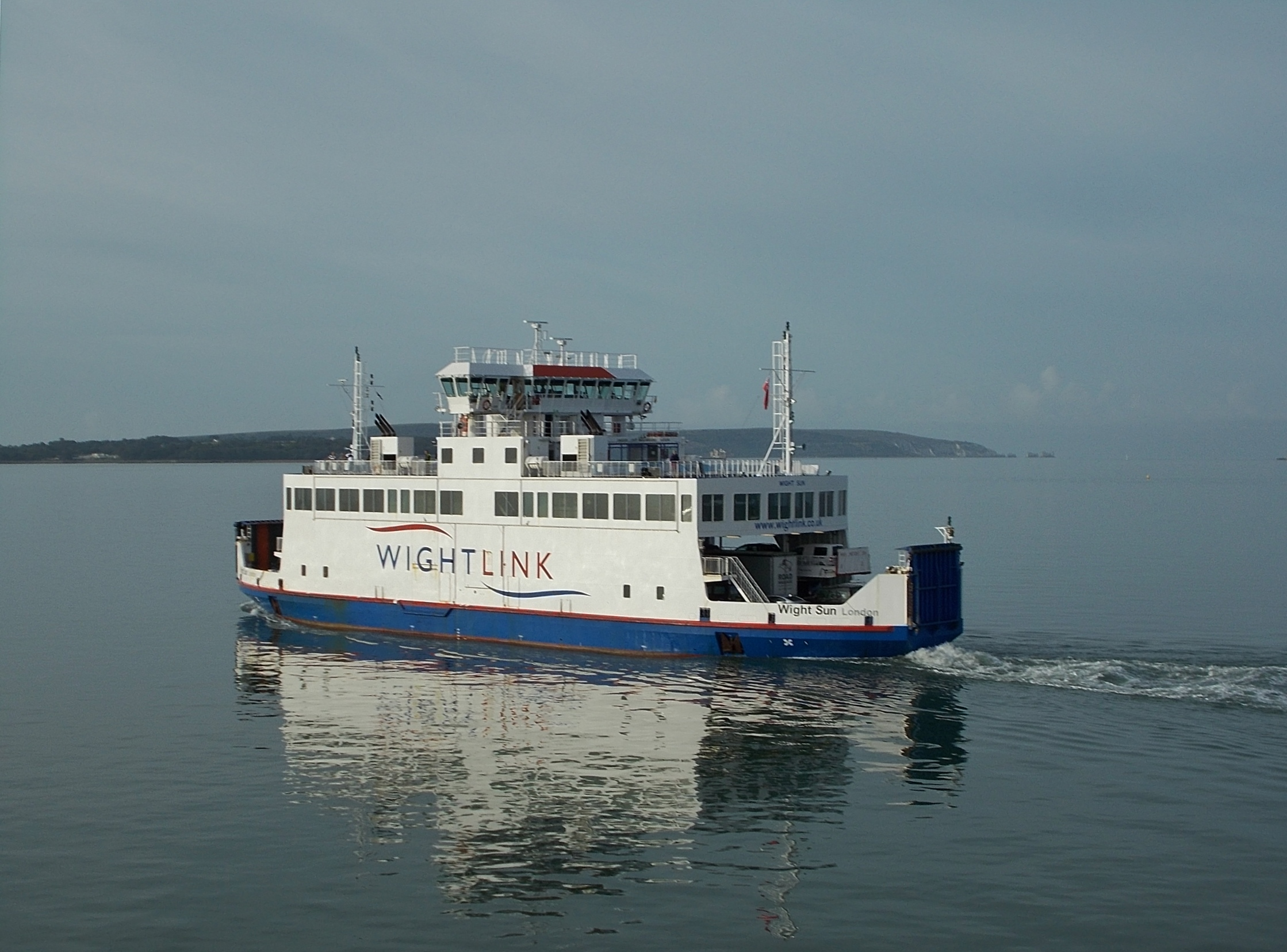
Wight Sun en route from Lymington to Yarmouth in 2019

Wight Sun joined the Wight-class fleet on the Yarmouth and Lymington service. Her two sister ships, Wight Light and Wight Sky entered service on 25 February 2009. In July 2015, she was transferred to the Portsmouth to Fishbourne route as a relief ferry. Wight Light, which was the relief ferry after St Helen was withdrawn, transferred back to the Lymington to Yarmouth route in its place.
