= Wight Sky =

Isle of Wight passenger and vehicle ferry

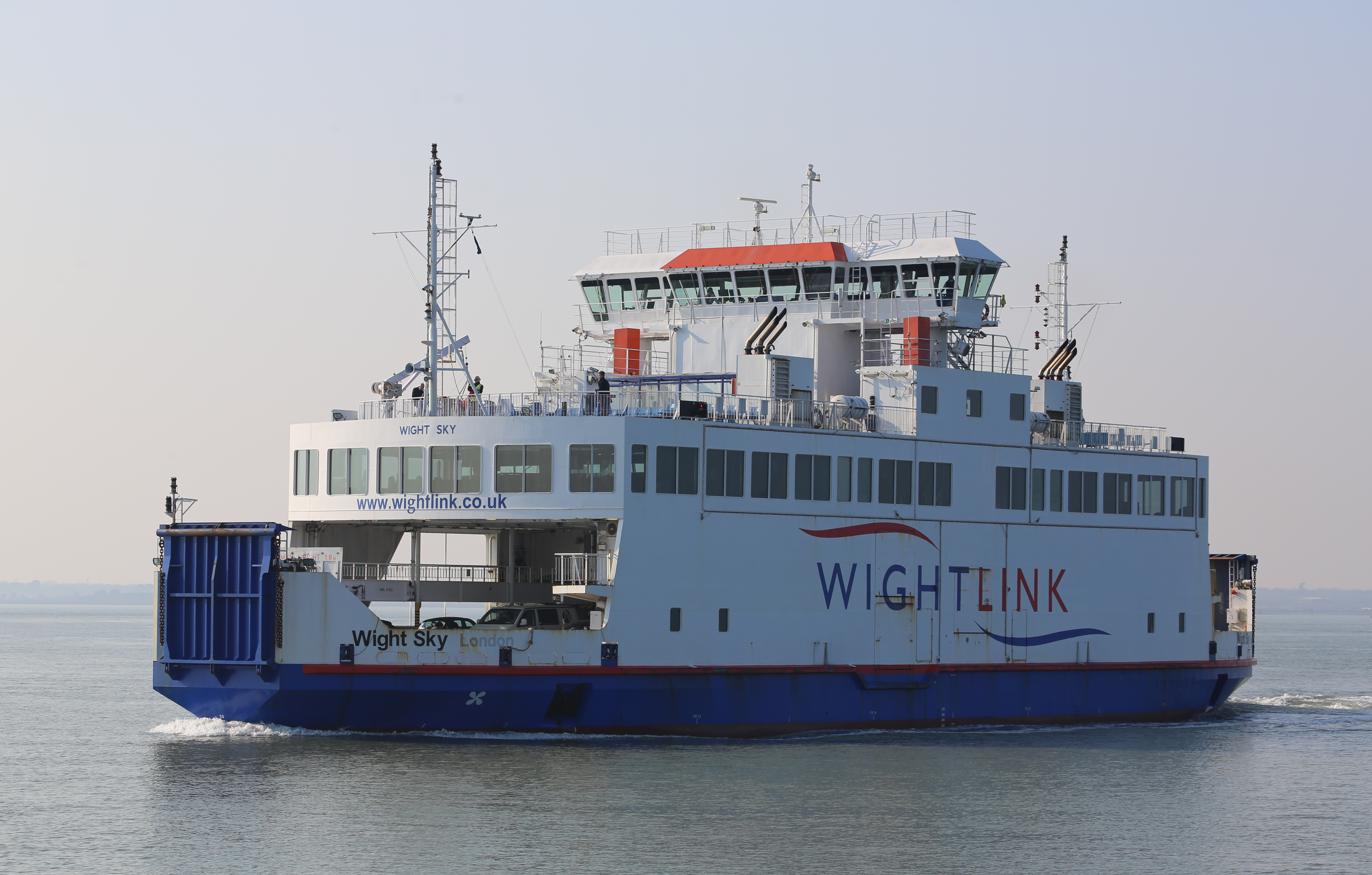
- Wight Sky in 2016

History

United Kingdom
- Name: Wight Sky
- Owner: Wightlink
- Operator: Wightlink
- Port of registry: London, United Kingdom
- Route: Lymington to Yarmouth, Isle of Wight; Portsmouth~Fishbourne 2015 onwards; (Seasonal relief vessel when required)
- Ordered: 12 March 2007
- Builder: Kraljevica Shipyard, Kraljevica, Croatia
- Yard number: 551
- Laid down: 13 August 2007
- Launched: 12 April 2008
- In service: 25 February 2009
- Identification: Call sign: 2ABV8; IMO number: 9446984; MMSI number: 235064783
- Status: In service

General characteristics
- Class & type: Wight class
- Tonnage: 2,546 GT; 360 DWT
- Displacement: 1,495 Tonnes at Full Capacity
- Length: 62.4 m (204.7 ft)
- Beam: 16.1 m (52.8 ft)
- Draught: 2.30 m (7.5 ft) at Full Capacity
- Decks: Two Passenger and three Car Decks
- Installed power: 4x 740bhp (552kw)Volvo Penta D16MH 16 litre 6cyl diesels
- Propulsion: 2 x Voith Schneider 21 R5/135 propeller units
- Speed: 11 knots (20 km/h; 13 mph)
- Capacity: 360 Passengers, 65 Cars, 110m of Freight Traffic
- Crew: Normally 10, can be as low as eight.

Wight Sky is a new design of roll-on/roll-off car and passenger ferry operating on Wightlink's Lymington to Yarmouth, Isle of Wight route.

== History ==
Wight Sky was constructed at the Kraljevica shipyard in Croatia and launched on 12 April 2008. After fitting out, she left Croatia on 15 September 2008 and arrived in Portsmouth on 2 October 2008.

== Design ==
Wight Sky, the second of three new vessels built for Wightlink, is a completely new design of vessel with more comfortable passenger facilities. The design by naval architects Hart Fenton & Company, utilises fixed and mobile mezzanine decks, complete disabled access and a larger cafe and sundeck area. There is a passenger lift between the car deck and passenger decks.

The new vessels do not have the additional third deck of the old C-class ferries, with the space incorporated into the passenger lounges. They are intended to last as long as the C-class vessels they replace.

== Service ==
Wight Sky is in service on the Yarmouth-Lymington crossing, with her sister ships Wight Light and Wight Sun. The Wight class vessels should be able to run to the existing timetable, with a scheduled crossing time of 30 minutes and 15 minutes turnaround.

The three previous vessels that ran the Lymington to Yarmouth route were retired and initially stored at Portsmouth. 35-year-old Cenred was brought back into service on 12 March 2009, when Wight Light broke down and was taken out of service for repairs to her hydraulic ramp.
