= MV St Clare =

Isle of Wight car and passenger ferry

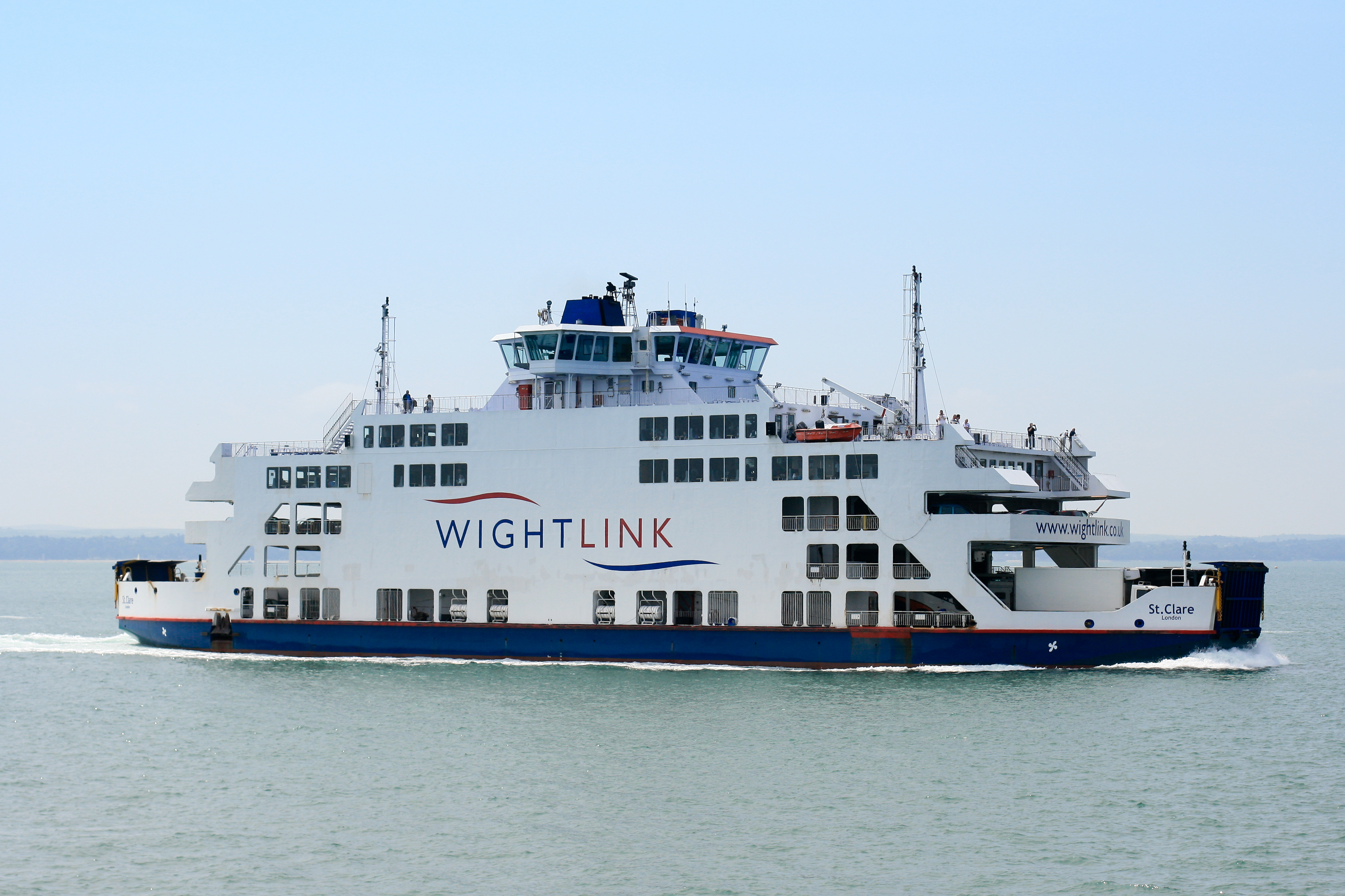

History

United Kingdom
- Name: MV St Clare
- Operator: Wightlink
- Port of registry: London
- Route: Portsmouth to Fishbourne
- Builder: Remontowa, Gdańsk
- Cost: £11.5m
- Launched: 26 April 2001
- In service: 20 July 2001
- Identification: IMO number: 9236949; MMSI number: 235002514; Callsign: ZNNR5
- Status: In service

General characteristics
- Class & type: Car Passenger Ferry (St Clare Class)
- Tonnage: 5,359 gt
- Displacement: 1,939 ton
- Length: 86.0 m (282.2 ft)
- Beam: 18.0 m (59.1 ft)
- Draught: 2.6 m (8.5 ft)
- Depth: 15.09ft
- Decks: 6, including 3 vehicle decks
- Installed power: 4x 965bhp Wärtsilä 5L20C 5-cyl diesel engines
- Propulsion: 4x Voith Schneider 21G 11/115 Cycloidal propellers
- Speed: 13 knots (24 km/h; 15 mph)
- Capacity: 878 passengers, 186 cars
- Crew: 10-15

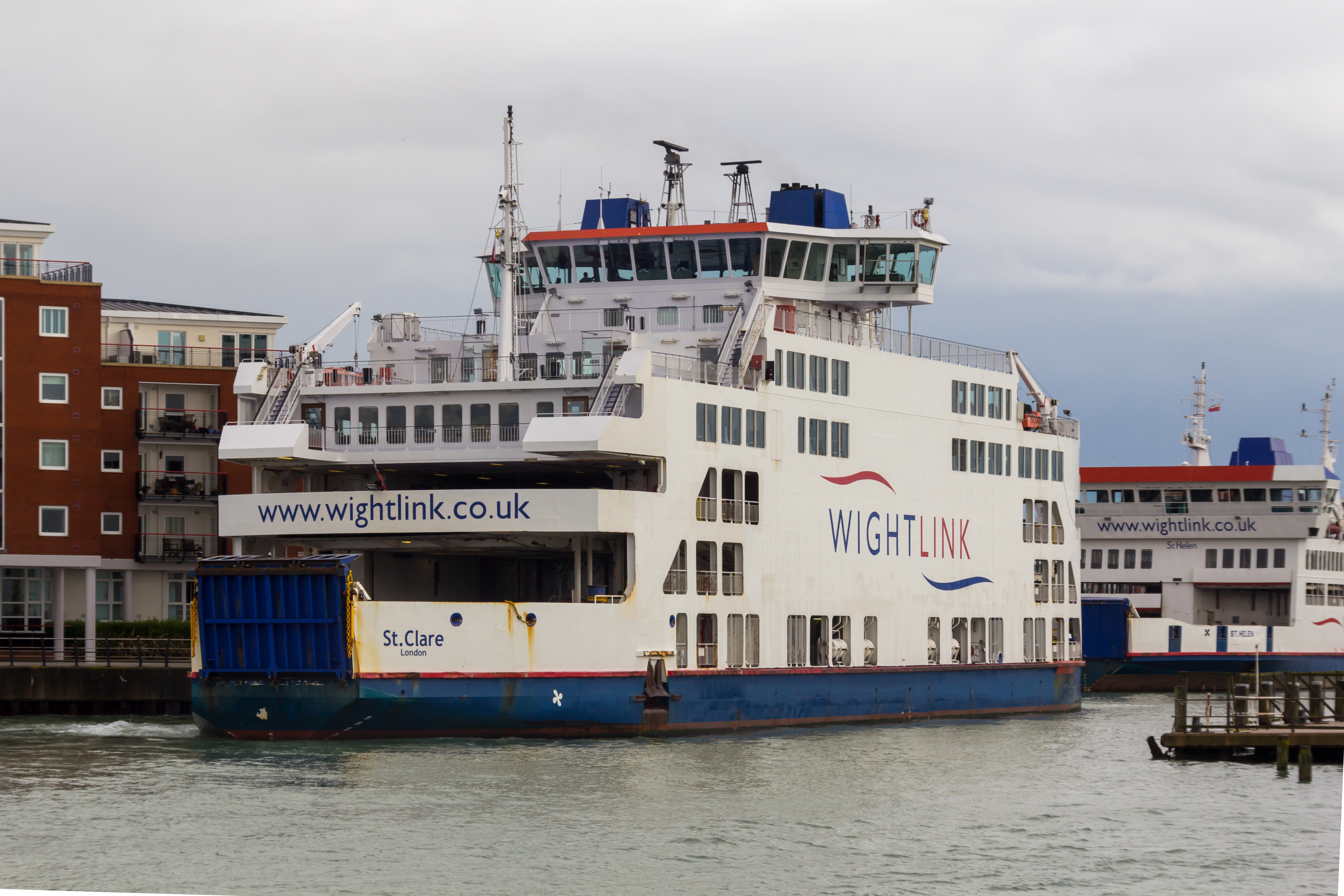
St Clare in Portsmouth

MV St Clare currently sails on the Portsmouth to Fishbourne route operated by Wightlink. She was built in Gdańsk in 2001. From her introduction in 2001 until January 2004, St Clare was the longest ship regularly crossing between the Isle of Wight and the British mainland, but was overtaken by Red Funnel's Red Osprey following that vessel's stretching.

St Clare can carry 878 passengers and 186 cars across three vehicle decks.

Her service speed is 13 knots, measuring 5,359 gt, with a length of 86 metres, beam of 18 metres and loaded draught of 2.6 metres. The ship has a double-end design, where the ship can travel in both directions, so that when it arrives, the vehicles are always facing the correct direction for disembarkation so she does not have to turn around before docking or after departing.
