= MV Cenred =

Former Isle of Wight passenger and vehicle ferry

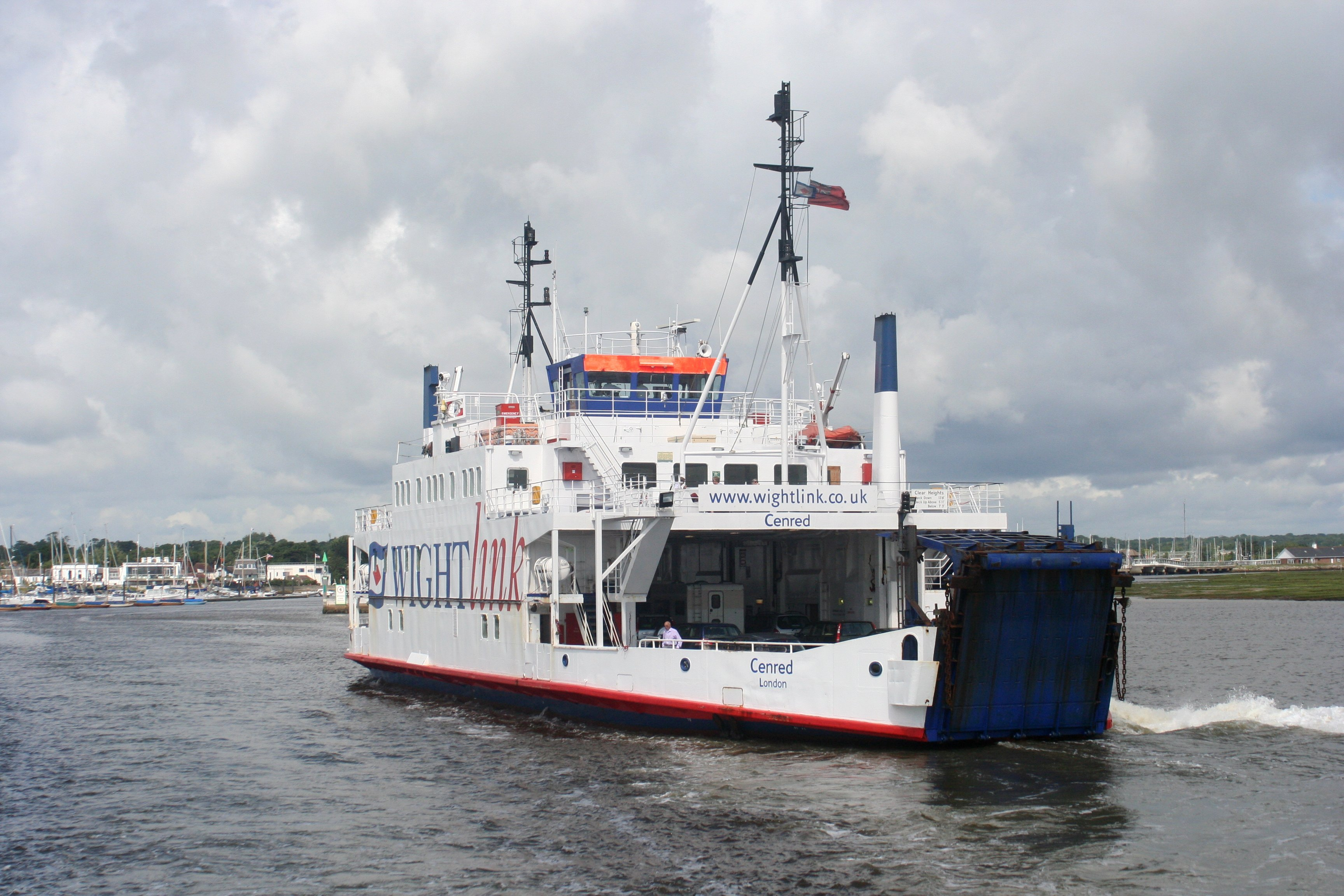

History

United Kingdom
- Name: MV Cenred
- Operator: Wightlink
- Builder: Robb Caledon Shipbuilders, Dundee
- Cost: £1.8 million
- Yard number: 562
- Launched: 3 July 1973
- Completed: July 1973
- In service: 1973
- Out of service: March 2009
- Identification: MMSI number: 234509000; IMO number: 7324091; Callsign: GUDR
- Fate: Broken up May 2010

General characteristics
- Type: Roll-on/roll-off Ferry
- Tonnage: 761 GRT; 180 DWT
- Length: 58.00 m (190.3 ft)
- Beam: 15.7 m (51.5 ft)
- Draught: 2.28 m (7.5 ft)
- Propulsion: 2x 400bhp 6cyl Mirrlees Blackstone ERS6M turbocharged diesel engines driving Voith Schneider cycloidal propellers
- Speed: 10.00 knots
- Capacity: 512 passengers; 58 cars

MV Cenred was one of Wightlink's 'C' class vehicle and passenger ferries on their route from Lymington to Yarmouth on the Isle of Wight.

== History ==
Cenred was built in 1973 for Sealink's Lymington to Yarmouth route by Robb Caledon Shipbuilders Ltd in Dundee, Scotland. The ship was named after Cenred of Wessex. She cost a total of £1.8 million to build and was one of three sister ships, the others being MV Caedmon and MV Cenwulf. They all passed to Wightlink after the privatisation of Sealink in 1984. Cenred remained on the route for her whole life.

Laid up at Marchwood in 2009,, Cenred was sold for scrapping and moved to Harlingen, Netherlands in March 2010, en route to Esbjerg in Denmark, in the hope of finding a new owner. Along with her sister ships, Cenred was broken up at Esbjerg in May 2010.

The Cenred in its Sealink livery, circa 1977

== Layout ==
The car deck had ramps fore and aft, allowing full ro-ro operation. Passenger accommodation was above the car deck, with the bridge above that.

== Service ==
Cenred operated the Lymington to Yarmouth ferry service from 1973 to 2008. Along with the two other 'C' class ships owned by Wightlink she was withdrawn from service on introduction of the three new Wight-class ferries. Cenred was brought back from retirement on 12 March 2009 when Wight Light required repairs to her hydraulic ramp.
