= MV Caedmon =

Former Isle of Wight passenger and vehicle ferry

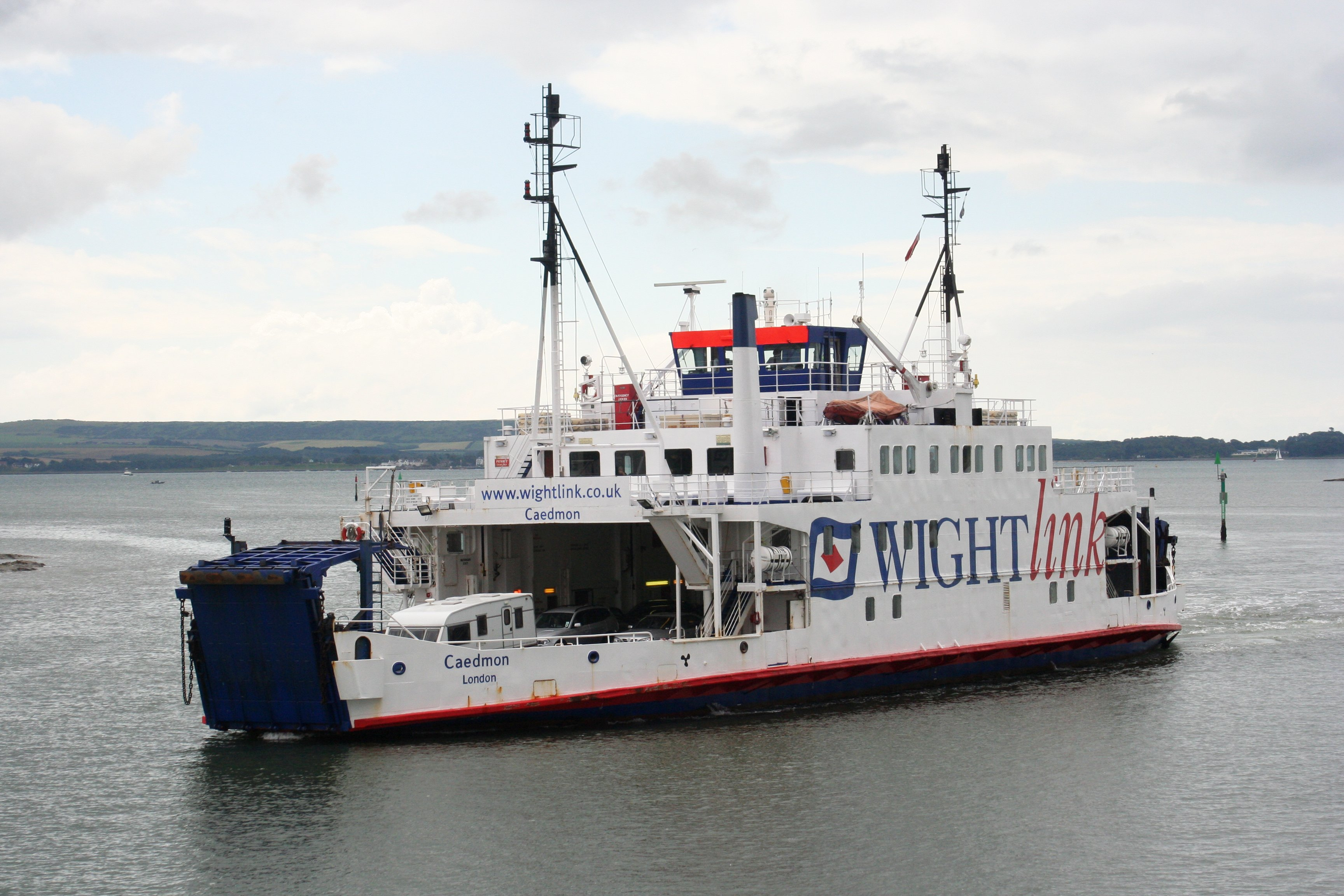
- MV Caedmon

History

United Kingdom
- Name: MV Caedmon
- Operator: Wightlink
- Builder: Robb Caledon Shipbuilders, Dundee
- Yard number: 560
- Launched: 3 May 1973
- Completed: July 1973
- In service: 1973
- Out of service: 2009
- Identification: MMSI number: 235031614; IMO number: 7314888; Callsign: GTHY
- Fate: Scrapped May 2010, Esbjerg, Denmark

General characteristics
- Type: Car passenger ferry
- Tonnage: 764 GRT 175 DWT
- Length: 58.00 m (190.3 ft)
- Beam: 15.7 m (51.5 ft)
- Draught: 2.28 m (7.5 ft)
- Propulsion: 2x 6cyl Mirrlees Blackstone ERS6M turbocharged diesel engines,400bhp each at 750rpm driving Voith Schneider cycloidal propellers
- Speed: 10.0 knots
- Capacity: 512 passengers; 58 cars

MV Caedmon was an Isle of Wight 'C' class ro-ro vehicle and passenger ferry. She operated for ten years on the Portsmouth to Fishbourne route before transferring to Wightlink's route from Lymington to Yarmouth. After 37 years of service, she was broken up in 2010.

== History ==
MV Caedmon was built in 1973 for Sealink by Robb Caledon Shipbuilders Ltd in Dundee, Scotland. The ship was named 'Caedmon' after the Anglo-Saxon poet Cædmon.

Caedmon served on the Portsmouth to Fishbourne route for her first ten years. For several weeks in 1979, she operated as a single-ended vessel after her prow was washed away during a storm.

When the Saint-class ships were put into service in 1983, Caedmon joined her sister ships, MV Cenwulf and MV Cenred, on the Lymington - Yarmouth route. All three passed to Wightlink after the privatisation of Sealink in 1984.

In 2008–09, on the introduction of three new Wight class ferries on the Lymington to Yarmouth route, the three 'C' class ships were withdrawn from service. They were sold for scrapping and initially laid up at Marchwood, before being towed to Esbjerg, in Denmark. Cenred, Caedmon and then Cenwulf were dismantled at Smedegaarden in May 2010.

== Layout ==
The car deck had a ramp fore and aft, allowing full ro-ro operation. The under car deck passenger accommodation cabins on all three boats, was not used for the last 20 years.

Twin 6-cylinder turbocharged Mirrlees Blackstone engines mounted at 45 degrees across each engine room drove Voith Schneider cycloidal propellers.

Unlike the earlier pioneer C-class ship Cuthred, the main engines were not additionally loaded by a generator, so larger Voith Schneider units were fitted and there was considerably more propulsive power.

Electrical supply was provided by two 6-cylinder Dorman/English electric gensets.

Fuel consumption was approximately 36 imperial gallons (160 litres; 43 US gallons) per hour.

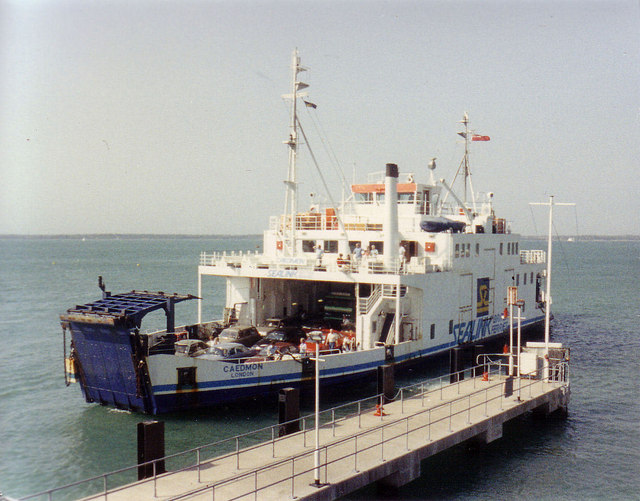
MV Caedmon at Yarmouth whilst operated by Sealink
