= Fishbourne, Isle of Wight =

Village on the Isle of Wight, England

Coordinates: 50.732°N 1.215°W

Fishbourne
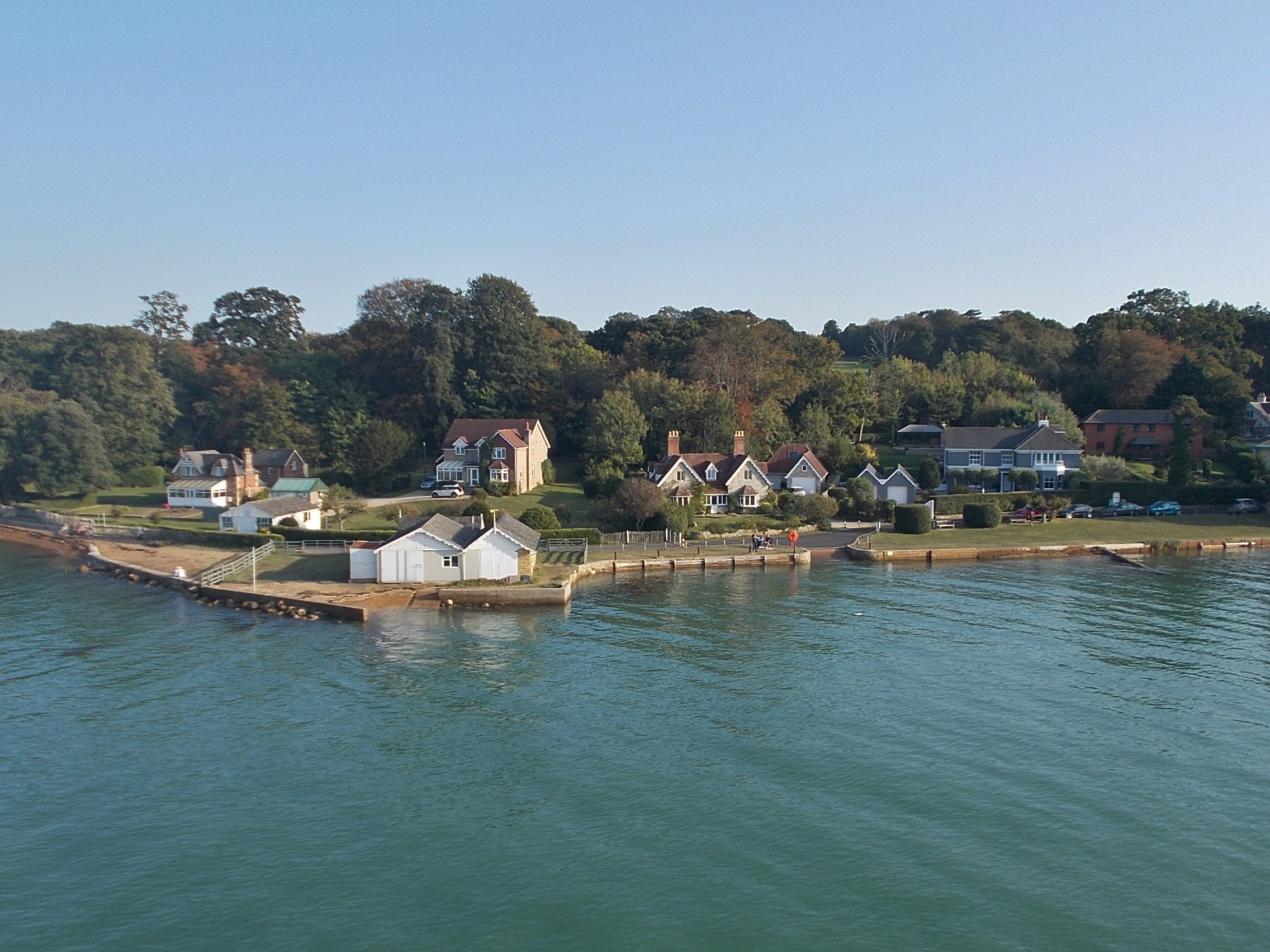
- Fishbourne seafront

- Location within the Isle of Wight
- Area: 2.1820 km^{2} (0.8425 sq mi)
- Population: 754 (2011)
  - Density: 346/km^{2} (900/sq mi)
- OS grid reference: SZ5592
- Civil parish: Fishbourne
- Unitary authority: Isle of Wight
- Ceremonial county: Isle of Wight
- Region: South East
- Country: England
- Sovereign state: United Kingdom
- Post town: RYDE
- Postcode district: PO33
- Dialling code: 01983
- Police: Hampshire and Isle of Wight
- Fire: Hampshire and Isle of Wight
- Ambulance: Isle of Wight
- UK Parliament: Isle of Wight East

Fishbourne is a village between Wootton and Ryde, on the Isle of Wight. It is positioned on the eastern bank of Wootton Creek, and includes the terminal for the Wightlink car ferry from Portsmouth.

Fishbourne, together with the adjoining Kite Hill area, became a civil parish in 2006 and has a parish council. The parish includes the ruined Norman abbey (founded 1132) and the Benedictine monastery including Quarr Abbey (founded in the early 1900s). Fishbourne is part of the electoral ward called Binstead and Fishbourne. This ward covers much of the Binstead district of Ryde parish and at the 2011 Census had a total population of 3,185.

The Royal Victoria Yacht Club and the Fishbourne Inn are located near the ferry terminal.

Public transport is provided by Southern Vectis bus routes 4 and 9, which stop on the main road, and operate to East Cowes, Newport and Ryde.

== Name ==
The name means 'the fish stream, the stream where fish are caught', from Old English fisc and burna, referring to Wootton Creek. There was a house, recorded from the 14th century until 1844, called Fisshehous 'the fish house'.

1267: Fisseburne

1769: Fishborn Creek

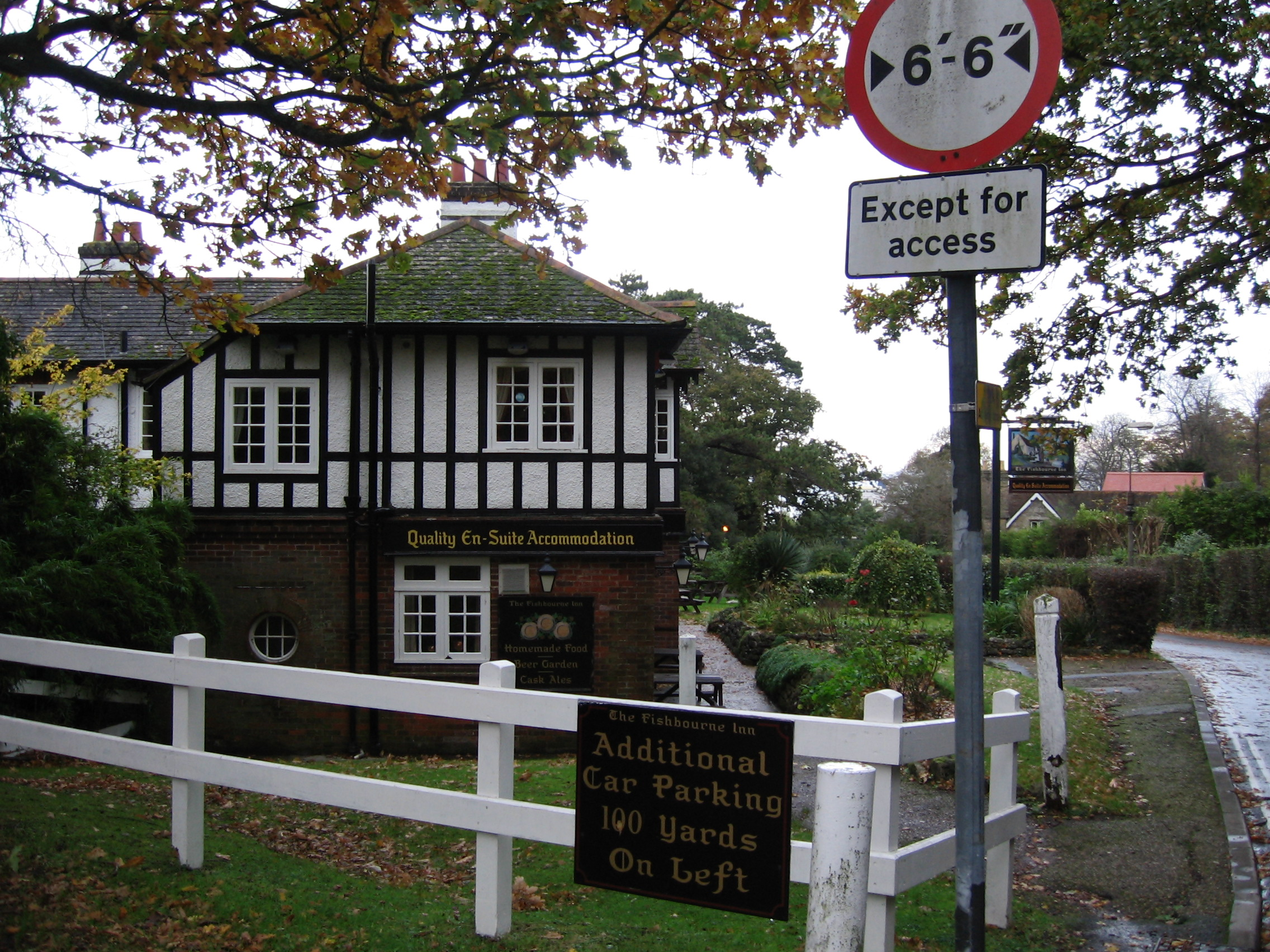
The Fishbourne Inn, near the Wightlink terminal.

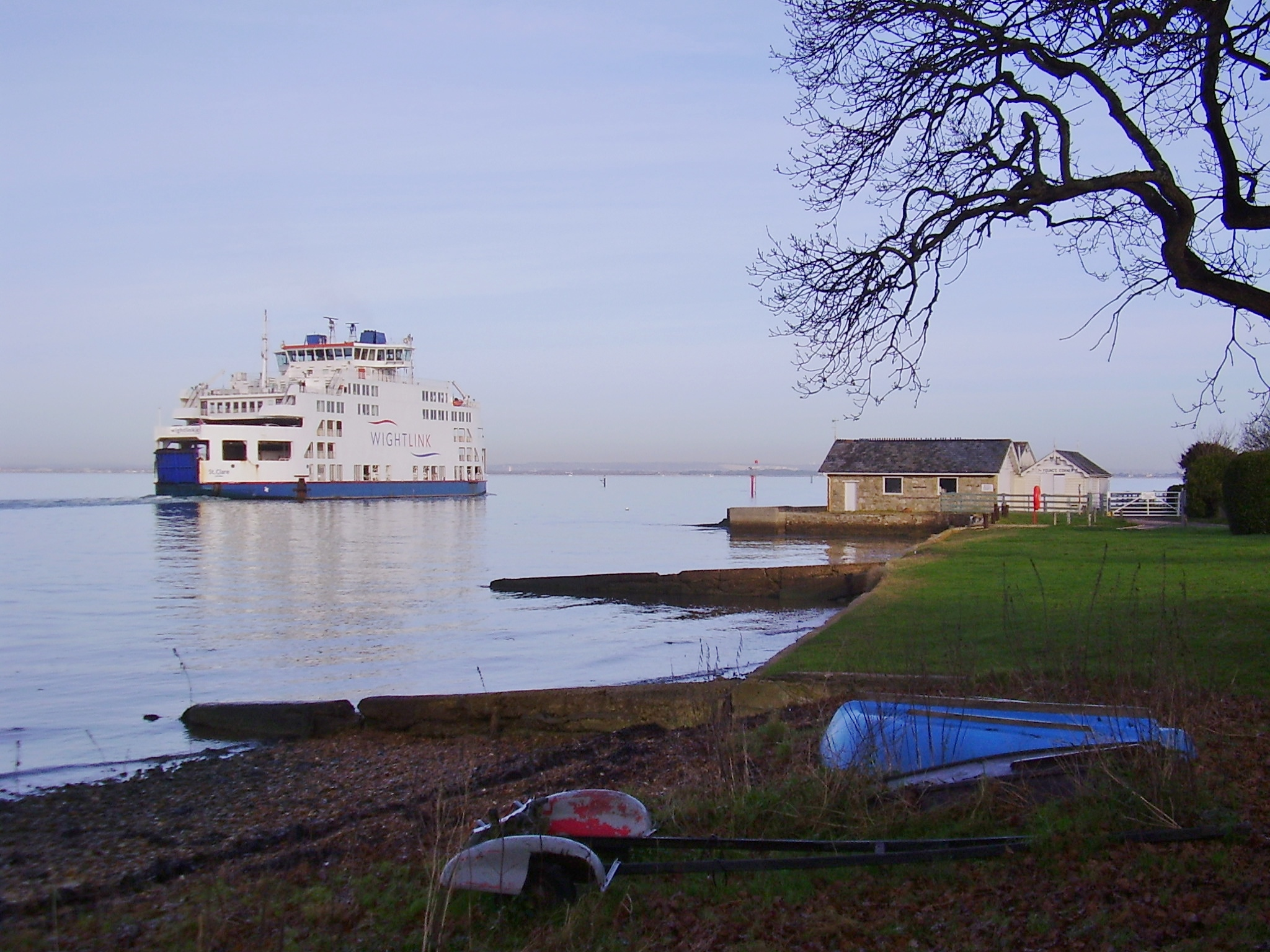
Wightlink car ferry leaving Fishbourne bound for Portsmouth
