= Our Lady Pamela =

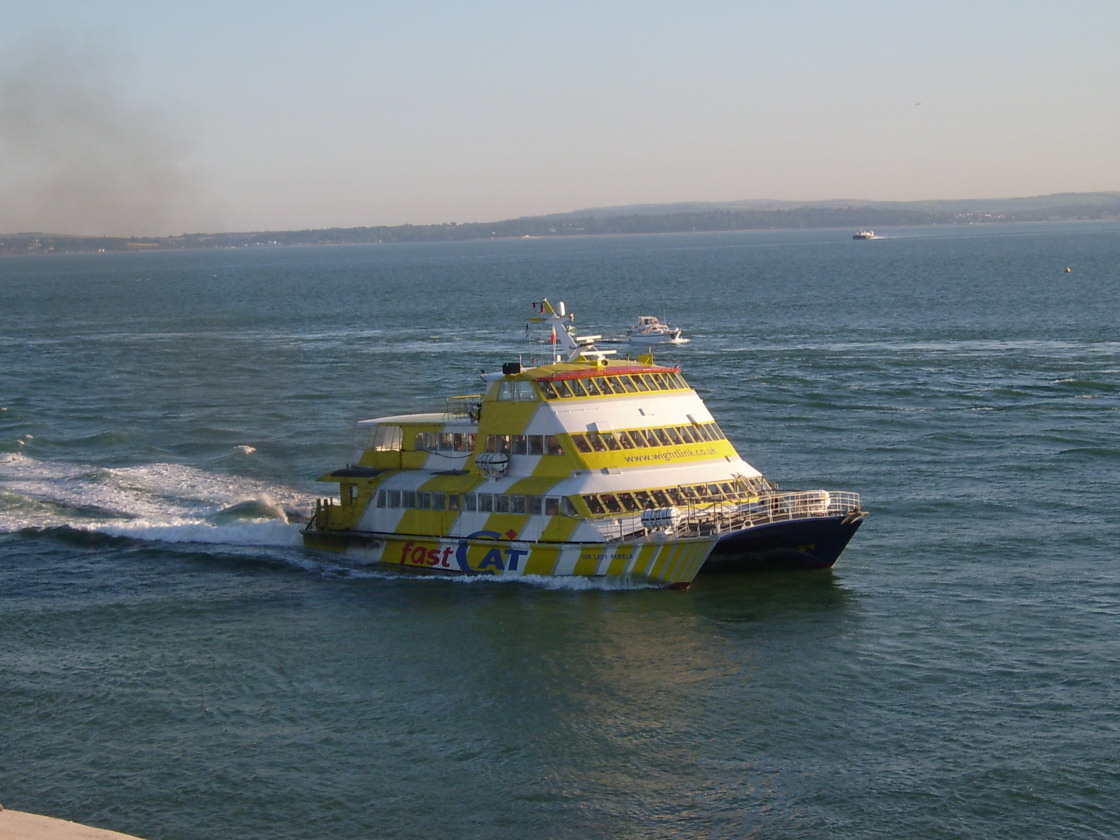

History

United Kingdom
- Name: Our Lady Pamela
- Operator: Wightlink
- Route: Ryde to Portsmouth
- Builder: Incat, Tasmania, Australia
- Yard number: 021
- Launched: 14 June 1986
- In service: 1986
- Out of service: 2008
- Identification: IMO number: 8508931
- Fate: Scrapped at Esbjerg, Denmark, April 2010

General characteristics
- Tonnage: 312 gt
- Length: 29.5 m
- Beam: 11.8 m
- Draught: 2.20m
- Installed power: 2x 1950bhp
- Propulsion: 2x 16-cyl MTU 16V396 diesels
- Speed: 29.4 knots (54.4 km/h; 33.8 mph)
- Capacity: 395 passengers
- Crew: 4-5

Our Lady Pamela was a high-speed catamaran ferry which operated between the Isle of Wight and mainland England. She had operated on the Wightlink Ryde Pier to Portsmouth route since 1986 under Sealink along with sister ship Our Lady Patricia. Both ships were named after the daughters of Lord Mountbatten, who had been the Governor of the Isle of Wight. It was built for Sealink by Incat, Australia.

In March 2009, it was announced that Wightlink would be replacing its FastCat catamarans with two new vessels, Wight Ryder I and Wight Ryder II. Our Lady Pamela was, however, taken out of service earlier than the two other vessels, FastCat Ryde and FastCat Shanklin. This was partly due to an engine fire causing significant damage.

She was scrapped at Esbjerg in April 2010.
