= List of ship launches in 2009 =

The list of ship launches in 2009 includes a chronological list of ships launched in 2009.

Date	Ship	Class / type	Builder	Location	Country	Notes
14 January	PTSC-Bach Ho	Floating Storage and Offloading vessel	Nam Trieu Ship Building Industry Corporation	Hai Phong	Vietnam	For Petrovietnam.
16 January	Drogdenbank		Ferus Smit	Leer	Germany	For Pot Scheepvaart
17 January	Halit Bey				Turkey	For VBG Shipping & Trading Co, Turkey.
18 January	New Mexico	Virginia-class submarine	Northrop Grumman	Newport News, Virginia	United States	
27 January	Al Khor	Sealand-New-York-type container ship	Ulsan	Hyundai Heavy Industries	South Korea	Reederei Hermann Wulff John-Peter Wulff
29 January	Mathilde Mærsk	M-class container ship	Odense Staalskibsvaerft	Lindø	Denmark	For Maersk Line
January	MSC Magnifica	Musica-class cruise ship	STX Europe	Saint-Nazaire	France	For MSC Cruises
11 February	Thor Heyerdahl	Fridtjof Nansen-class frigate	Navantia	Ferrol	Spain	For Royal Norwegian Navy
13 February	AIDAluna	Cruise ship	Meyer Werft	Papenburg	Germany	Official launch at Palma de Mallorca, built at Papenburg for AIDA Cruises.
14 February	Rio Blanco	Rio-class container ship	Daewoo Mangalia Heavy Industries	Mangalia	Romania	For Hamburg Süd
27 February	Silver Spirit	Cruise ship	Fincantieri	Ancona	Italy	For Silversea Cruises
28 February	MSC Camille	MSC Danit-type container ship	Daewoo Shipbuilding & Marine Engineering	Geoje	South Korea	For Mediterranean Shipping Company
8 March	Wally Schirra	Lewis and Clark-class dry cargo ship	National Steel and Shipbuilding	San Diego, California	United States	
12 March	Costa Deliziosa	Hybrid Vista and Spirit-class cruise ship	Fincantieri	Marghera	Italy	For Costa Cruises
12 March	Rio Bravo	Rio-class container ship	Daewoo Mangalia Heavy Industries	Mangalia	Romania	For Hamburg Süd
21 March	Bro Garland		Ferus Smit	Hoogezand	Netherlands	
27 March	Frisia Lübeck		Nordseewerke	Emden	Germany	
28 March	Eemsborg		Niestern Sander	Delfzijl	Netherlands	For Wagenborg Shipping
30 March	Gravely	Arleigh Burke-class destroyer	Ingalls Shipbuilding	Pascagoula, Mississippi	United States	
30 March	Medbaffin	type CV Venus 5300 container ship	Zhejiang Ouhua Shipbuilding	Zhoushan	China	For Reederei Buss
March	MSC Danit	Container ship	Daewoo Shipbuilding & Marine Engineering	Okpo	South Korea	
9 April	Navi Baltic	Sietas type 178 container ship	Schiffswerft J.J. Sietas	Hamburg-Neuenfelde	Germany	For Amisco, Tallinn
25 April	Sattha Bhum	Type Stocznia Gdynia 8184-container ship	Stocznia Gdynia	Gdynia	Poland	
30 April	Wight Ryder II	Catamaran	FBMA		Philippines	For Wightlink
25 May	Wind Force I		Diedrich Shipyard	Oldersum	Germany	For AG Norden-Frisia
6 June	Celebrity Equinox	Solstice-class cruise ship	Meyer Werft	Papenburg	Germany	For Celebrity Cruises
7 June	Stena Britannica	RoPax 55	Wandan Yards	Wismar	Germany	For Stena Line
7 June	Stena Hollandica	RoPax 55	Wandan Yards	Wismar	Germany	For Stena Line
12 June	Eclipse	container ship	Blohm + Voss	Hamburg	Germany	luxury yacht
16 June	Fivelborg		Ferus Smit	Leer	Germany	For Wagenborg Shipping
18 June	Arpão	Type 214 submarine	HDW	Kiel	Germany	For Portuguese Navy
25 June	Seabourn Odyssey	Cruise ship	T Mariotti SpA	Venice	Italy	For Seabourn Cruise Line
26 June	Azura	Grand-class cruise ship	Fincantieri	Monfalcone	Italy	For P&O Cruises
4 July	Saipem 12000		Samsung Heavy Industries	Geoje	South Korea	
11 July	Elysee	Sietas type 178 container ship	Schiffswerft J.J. Sietas	Hamburg-Neuenfelde	Germany	For JR Shipping BV Elysee
11 July	Mederie	type CV Venus 5300 container ship	Zhejiang Ouhua Shipbuilding	Zhoushan	China	For Reederei Buss
16 July	Samskip Innovator	Damen Container Feeder 800 container ship	Santierul Naval Damen Galati SA	Galați	Romania	
26 July	Arihant	Arihant-class submarine	Shipbuilding Centre	Visakhapatnam	India	
1 August	Jason Dunham	Arleigh Burke-class destroyer	Bath Iron Works	Bath, Maine	United States	
5 August	Rio Madeira	Rio-class container ship	Daewoo Mangalia Heavy Industries	Mangalia	Romania	For Hamburg Süd
14 August	Seychelles Paradise	Tanker	Lindenau	Kiel	Germany	
16 August	Matthew Perry	Lewis and Clark-class dry cargo ship	National Steel and Shipbuilding	San Diego, California	United States	
18 August	Borkum		Nordseewerke	Emden	Germany	
21 August	Ise	Hyūga-class helicopter destroyer	IHI Marine United		Japan	
27 August	Five Stars Fujian	bulk carrier	Sasebo HI	Sasebo	China	
28 August	Samskip Endeavour	Damen Container Feeder 800 container ship	Santierul Naval Damen Galati	Galați	Romania	
29 August	Royal Helena	Barquentine			Bulgaria	
4 September	Petrozavodsk	Reefer cargo ship	Skala Skipasmidja	Faroe Islands	Russia	For P/f Kenn
18 September	Kochi	Kolkata-class destroyer	Mazagon Dock Limited	Mumbai	India	
19 September	Ferdinand R. Hassler	Hydrographic survey vessel	VT Halter Marine	Moss Point, Mississippi	United States	For the National Oceanic and Atmospheric Administration
23 September	Sampson	Goliath-class crane ship	Pt. Drydocks World Pertama	Batam	Indonesia	For CVI Global Lux Oil & Gas 4 Sàrl
1 October	Le Boreal	Cruise ship	Fincantieri	Ancona	Italy	For Compagnie du Ponant
22 October	Vivien A	VW 2500-type container ship	Volkswerft Stralsund	Stralsund	Germany	
16 October	Hakuryū	Sōryū-class submarine			Japan	
16 October	Meteoro	Buque de Acción Marítima	Navantia	San Fernando, Cádiz	Spain	For Armada Española
21 October	Defender	Type 45 destroyer	BVT Surface Fleet	Govan	United Kingdom	
30 October	Nieuw Amsterdam	Vista-class cruise ship	Fincantieri	Marghera	Italy	For Holland America Line
6 November	Vienna Express	Vienna Express-class container ship	Hyundai Heavy Industries	Ulsan	South Korea	For Hapag Lloyd
6 November	MSC Sonia	MSC Danit-type container ship	Daewoo Shipbuilding & Marine Engineering	Geoje	South Korea	For Mediterranean Shipping Company
6 November	Medsuperior	type CV Venus 5300 container ship	Zhejiang Ouhua Shipbuilding	Zhoushan	China	For Reederei Buss
18 November	Amazonas	Amazonas-class offshore patrol vessel	BAE Systems Marine	Portsmouth	United Kingdom	For Brazilian Navy.
19 November	Scarborough	Offshore patrol vessel	BAE Systems Surface Ships	Scotstoun	United Kingdom	For Trinidad and Tobago Coast Guard.
20 November	Missouri	Virginia-class submarine	General Dynamics Electric Boat	Groton, Connecticut	United States	
20 November	Allure of the Seas	Oasis-class cruise ship	STX Europe	Turku	Finland	For Royal Caribbean International
21 November	Pioneer		Ferus Smit	Westerbroek	Netherlands	
11 December	Frisia Cottbus	TNSW 3400	Nordseewerke	Emden	Germany	
11 December	Basle Express	Vienna Express-class container ship	Hyundai Heavy Industries	Ulsan	South Korea	For Hapag Lloyd
11 December	Budapest Express	Vienna Express-class container ship	Hyundai Heavy Industries	Ulsan	South Korea	For Hapag Lloyd
15 December	William P. Lawrence	Arleigh Burke-class destroyer	Ingalls Shipbuilding	Pascagoula, Mississippi	United States	
24 December	Prague Express	Prague Express-class container ship	Hyundai Heavy Industries	Ulsan	South Korea	For Hapag Lloyd
30 December	CPO Savona	MSC Danit-type container ship	Daewoo Shipbuilding & Marine Engineering	Geoje	South Korea	For Mediterranean Shipping Company
Exact date unknown	Clyde Clipper	Ferry	David Abels Boatbuilders Ltd.	Bristol	United Kingdom	For Clyde Cruises.
Exact date unknown	Galéeon Andalucía	Galleon			Spain	For private owner.
Exact date unknown	Rathlin Express	Ferry	Arklow Marine Services	Arklow	Ireland	For Government of Northern Ireland.
Exact date unknown	Wight Ryder I	Catamaran	FBMA		Philippines	For Wightlink
Exact date unknown	Le Pietre	Gulet	Ada Yacht Works	Bodrum	Turkey	
