= FastCat Shanklin =

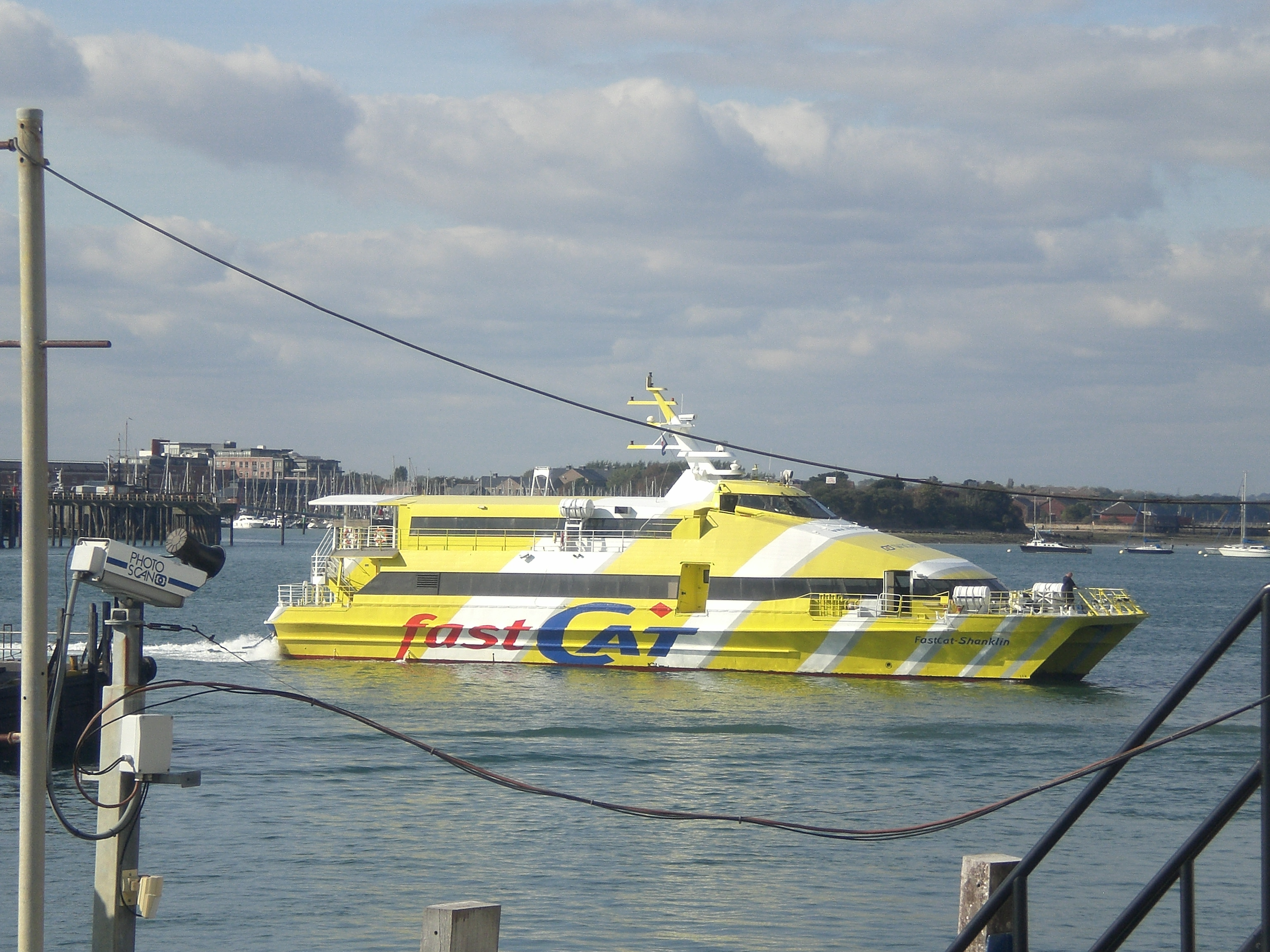

History
- Name: Water Jet 2; Supercat 18; FastCat Shanklin; Sochi-2
- Operator: 2000-2009: Wightlink; 2009-2010: Severn Link; 2011-present Alien
- Port of registry: 1996–2000: Manila, Philippines; 2000–2011: Portsmouth, United Kingdom; 2011 onwards: Novorossiysk, Russia
- Route: Ryde to Portsmouth: 2000-2009
- Builder: Kværner Fjellstrand, Singapore
- Yard number: 020
- Laid down: 5 October 1994
- Launched: 9 September 1996
- Maiden voyage: 1996
- In service: 1996
- Identification: Call sign: UBIH6; IMO number: 8888513; MMSI number: 273350130
- Fate: Sold to Russia 2011

General characteristics
- Tonnage: 482 GT
- Length: 40 m
- Beam: 10.10 m
- Draught: 1.70m
- Propulsion: 2× 16cyl MTU 16V396 diesel engines driving waterjets
- Speed: 34 knots (63 km/h; 39 mph)
- Capacity: 361 passengers
- Crew: 4-5

FastCat Shanklin is a high speed catamaran ferry which operated between the Isle of Wight and mainland England. She operated on the Wightlink Ryde Pier to Portsmouth route from 2000 to 2009 along with her sister ship FastCat Ryde. Prior to working for Wightlink, the ship worked in Singapore and was named Water Jet 2. In 1999, the year before it was sold to Wightlink, its name was changed to Supercat 18.

From early autumn 2009, Wightlink took delivery of two new vessels to operate the route, Wight Ryder I and Wight Ryder II. Both the FastCat Shanklin and FastCat Ryde were retained by Wightlink until 2010, due to teething problems which occurred with the new vessels. They were then sold on to new owners Severn Link. In January 2010, the FastCat Shanklin was re-painted into a new livery for use with Severn Link travelling between Ilfracombe and Swansea as part of a new catamaran service with a shorter travel time of 50 minutes. The re-paint occurred in Portsmouth Harbour and shortly afterwards the ferry departed for Swansea. On 29 January 2010 the ship arrived in the Bristol Channel and visited Ilfracombe before heading to Swansea Docks. After arriving there it received an interior refurbishment. However the proposed ferry service failed to start as stated by Severn Link at Easter 2010.

By August 2010 the planned ferry service had been postponed indefinitely and FastCat Shanklin was put up for sale along with her sister ship Rapparee (formerly FastCat Ryde). On 3 August she moved from Swansea to Hythe, Hampshire. In May 2011, having been sold to Alien, a Russian company, the two craft were transported to the Black Sea on board the Beluga Fantasy.
