= FastCat Ryde =

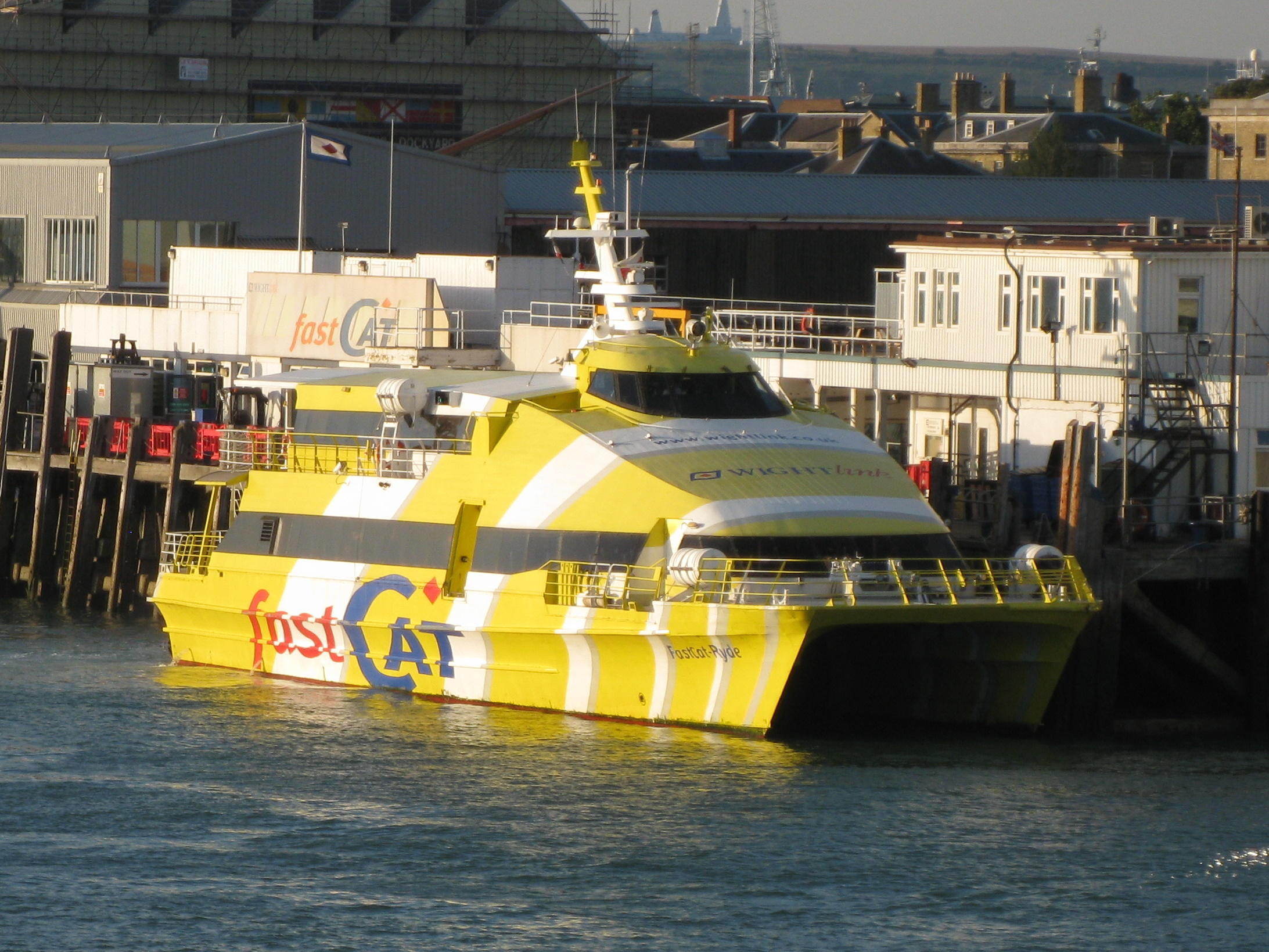

History

United Kingdom
- Name: Water Jet 1; Supercat 17; Fastcat Ryde; Fastcat-Ryde; Rapparee; Sochi-1
- Owner: 2011 onwards: Rosmorport
- Operator: 2000-2010: Wightlink; 2010-2011: Severn Link
- Port of registry: 2011 onwards: Novorossiysk, Russia
- Route: Ryde to Portsmouth: 2000-2010
- Builder: Kværner Fjellstrand, Singapore
- Yard number: 018
- Laid down: 15 June 1994
- Launched: 3 April 1995
- Maiden voyage: 1996
- In service: 1996
- Identification: Call sign: UBIH7; IMO number: 9144976; MMSI number: 273351130
- Status: In service

General characteristics
- Tonnage: 482 gt
- Length: 40 m
- Beam: 10.10 m
- Draught: 1.70m
- Decks: 2
- Propulsion: 2x 16-cyl MTU 16V396 diesel engines driving waterjets
- Speed: 34 knots (63 km/h; 39 mph)
- Capacity: 361 passengers
- Crew: 4–5

FastCat Ryde is a high speed catamaran ferry. The vessel was built in Singapore for service in the Philippines as Water Jet 1. She was bought by Wightlink in 2000 and following an extensive refit entered service on the Ryde Pier to Portsmouth route in August of that year along with her sister ship FastCat Shanklin.

From early Autumn 2009, Wightlink took delivery of two new vessels to operate the route, Wight Ryder I and Wight Ryder II. Both the FastCat Shanklin and FastCat Ryde were retained by Wightlink until Spring 2010 and drafted in as replacements as teething problems occurred with the new vessels. They were then sold on to new owners in Bristol.

On 12 January 2010, the FastCat Ryde crashed into Ryde Pier by landing heavily causing superficial damage to the vessel and a section of the pier. No one was injured in the crash and the vessel was sailed back empty to Portsmouth Harbour for a full investigation to be carried out.

In 2010 she was sold, along with her sister craft, to Severn Link in Ilfracombe to operate a service between there and Swansea. As a result of a local competition she was renamed Rapparee. The projected service failed to materialise and in August she returned to Southampton. In May 2011, having been sold to Alien, a Russian company, the two craft were transported to the Black Sea on board the Beluga Fantasy.
