= Our Lady Patricia =

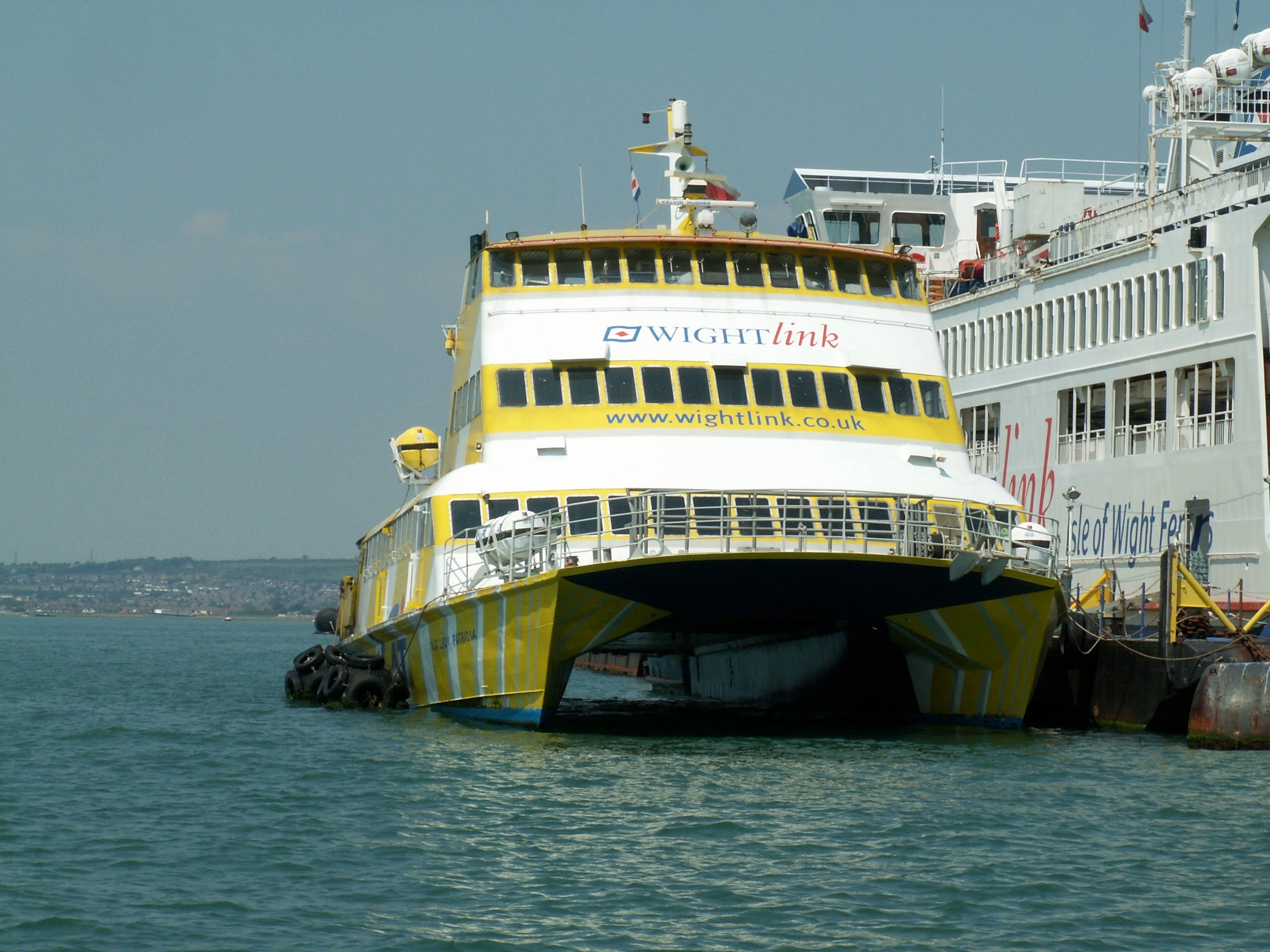

History

United Kingdom
- Name: Our Lady Patricia
- Operator: Wightlink
- Route: Ryde to Portsmouth
- Builder: Incat, Tasmania, Australia
- Yard number: 020
- Launched: 28 November 1985
- In service: 1986
- Out of service: 2006
- Identification: IMO number: 8507494
- Fate: Scrapped 10 December 2006

General characteristics
- Tonnage: 312 gt
- Length: 29.5 m
- Beam: 11.8 m
- Installed power: 2x 1950bhp
- Propulsion: 2x MTU 16v396 diesels
- Speed: 28.5 knots (52.8 km/h; 32.8 mph)
- Capacity: 410 passengers

Our Lady Patricia was a high speed catamaran ferry which operated between the Isle of Wight and mainland England. Built for Sealink by Incat, Australia, it operated on the Wightlink Ryde Pier to Portsmouth route from 1986 to 2006, in conjunction with sister ship Our Lady Pamela. She was scrapped at Marchwood in 2006. Both ships were named after the daughters of Lord Mountbatten, who had been the Governor of the Isle of Wight.
