= Wight Ryder I =

Isle of Wight passenger catamaran

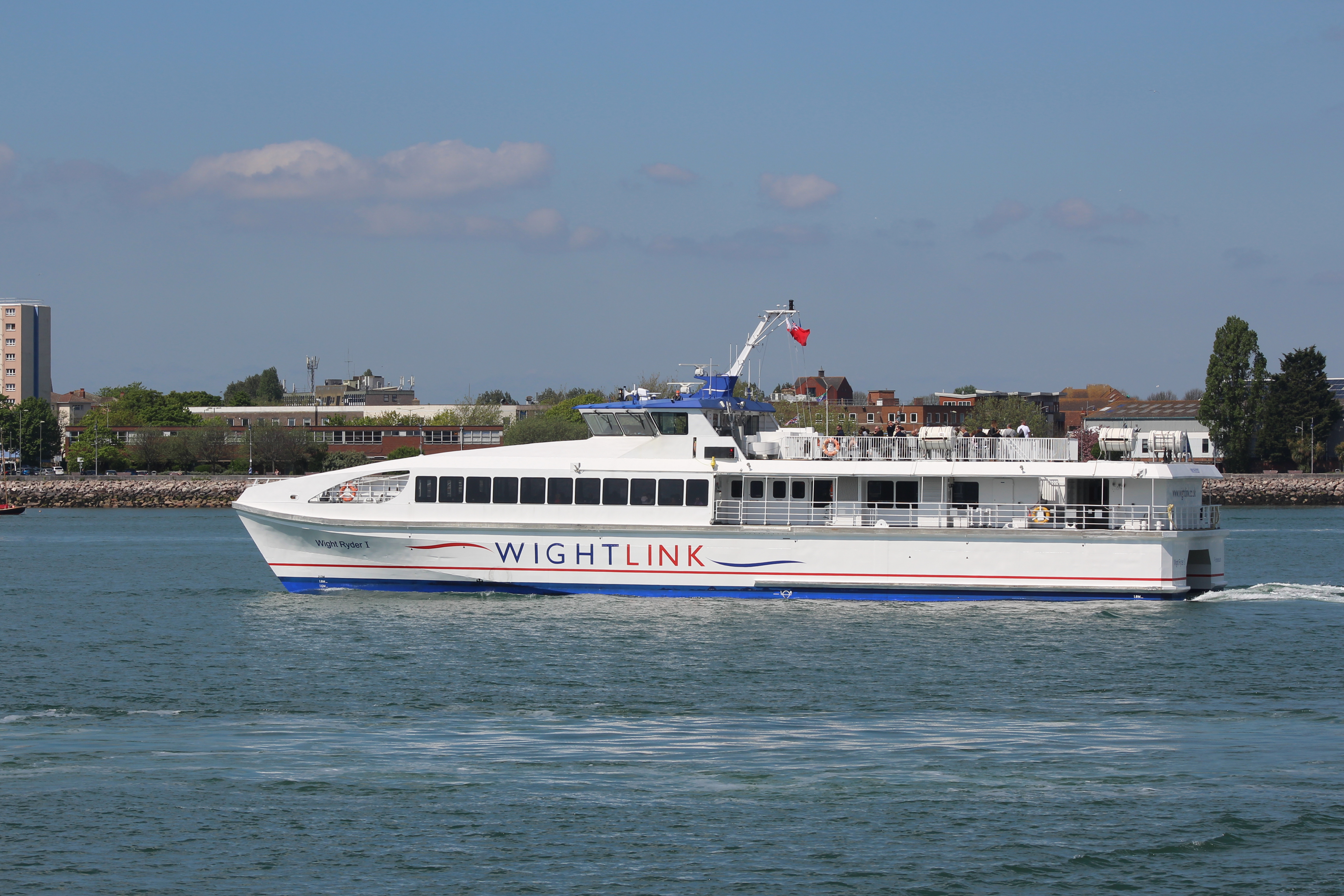
- Wight Ryder I leaving Portsmouth

History

United Kingdom
- Name: Wight Ryder I
- Operator: Wightlink
- Port of registry: Portsmouth
- Route: Ryde to Portsmouth
- Builder: FBMA, Philippines
- Yard number: 1026
- Launched: 2009
- Maiden voyage: 2009
- In service: 29 September 2009
- Identification: IMO number: 9512537; MMSI number: 235069875; Callsign: 2BWG5
- Status: Operational

General characteristics
- Tonnage: 520 GT
- Length: 41 metres (135 ft)
- Beam: 12 metres (39 ft)
- Draught: 1.60 metres (5 ft 3 in)
- Installed power: 2x 12-cyl Caterpillar C32 ACERT diesel engines
- Speed: 26.7 knots (49.4 km/h; 30.7 mph)
- Capacity: 260 passengers
- Crew: 4–5

Wight Ryder I is one of two high-speed passenger catamarans operated by Wightlink on the Ryde to Portsmouth route.

Built by FBMA in Cebu in The Philippines, with sister ship Wight Ryder II, it replaced FastCat Ryde and FastCat Shanklin in September 2009. Following the introduction of the Wight Ryders into service, the existing vessels, FastCat Ryde and FastCat Shanklin were withdrawn and sold to new owners in Bristol.

Unlike the older catamarans, the new vessels do not feature yellow and white "FastCat" branding, but are painted in a similar livery to Wightlink's larger car ferries. They include an open-air upper deck whereas the previous catamarans were fully enclosed.

On introduction, the vessels were criticised for being too slow and too small, with a seating capacity reduced from 294 to 260. Wightlink stated that a new timetable would be introduced offering more services during the day to ensure that there would be sufficient places to meet demand. The maximum speed is 26 knots compared to 34 knots for the earlier vessels, but as significant time is spent in the speed-limited region round Portsmouth Harbour, only a couple of minutes are lost, and fuel consumption is significantly less. However, the tight turnarounds can give cumulative delays if only one vessel is in operation on an hourly service.

A private naming and dedication ceremony took place on 17 September 2009 following the issuing of the passenger certificate. The vessels were initially expected to go into service on 21 September, with two days of discounted travel enabling passengers to trial the new vessels, but this was later postponed and occurred towards the end of September.

Following the launch, further problems arose when Wight Ryder II suffered a generator fault. This was followed by more problems on a later crossing involving a bang. The vessel returned to Ryde Pier, and was temporarily replaced with an older FastCat vessel. Wightlink were criticised by passengers for poor levels of communication. The older FastCats were again drafted in the following weekend when engineers discovered fuel contamination affecting both vessels.
