= Balamban =

Municipality in Cebu, Philippines

- Municipality
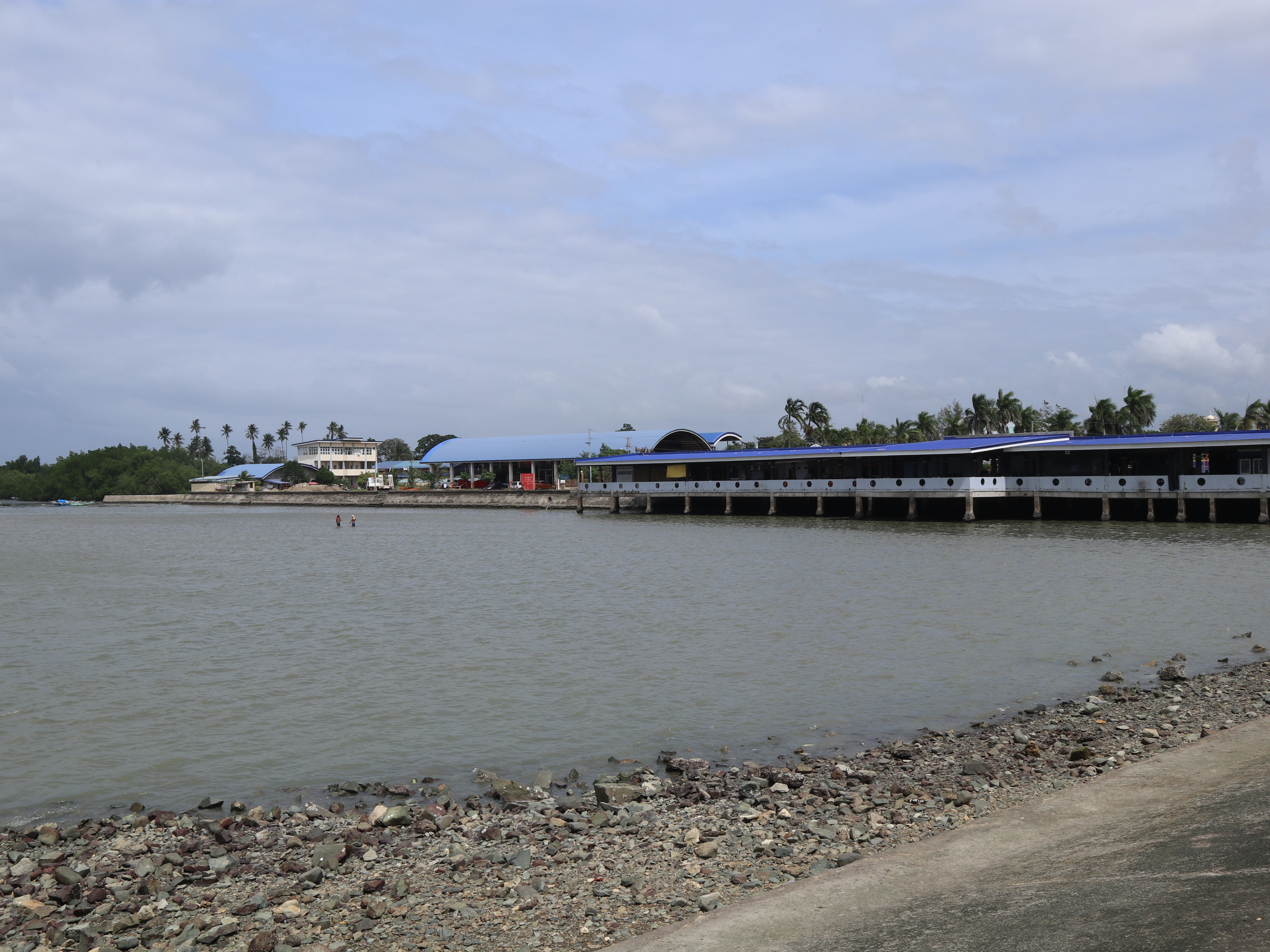
- Balamban Baywalk

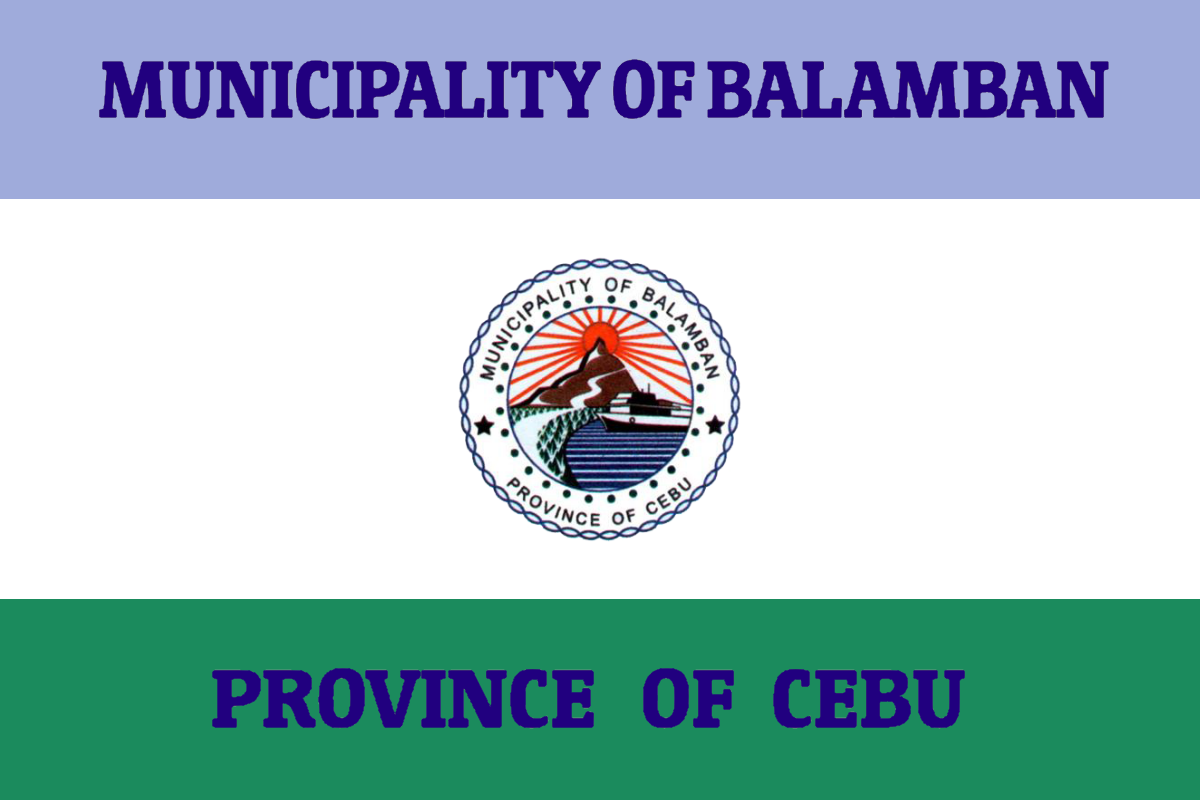
- Flag Seal
- Nickname: Shipbuilding Capital of the Philippines
- Anthem: Balamban Hymn
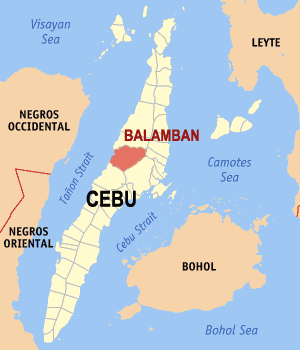
- Map of Cebu with Balamban highlighted
- Interactive map of Balamban
- Location within the Philippines Balamban (Philippines)
- Coordinates: 10°28′N 123°47′E
- Country: Philippines
- Region: Central Visayas
- Province: Cebu
- District: 3rd district
- Barangays: 28 (see Barangays)

Government
  - Type: Sangguniang Bayan
  - Mayor: Amos Cabahug (IND)
  - Vice Mayor: Alex Francis V. Binghay II (1Cebu)
  - Representative: Pablo John F. Garcia
  - Municipal Council: Members: Andres G. Borgonia; Anastacio A. Lape; Joedell S. Pilapil; Eliezer M. Climaco; Rhodessa P. Paulin; Roel P. Cabañero; Gemma A. Monong; Emmanuel B. Jo
  - Electorate: 55,263 voters (2025)

Area
  - Total: 333.56 km^{2} (128.79 sq mi)
- Elevation: 35 m (115 ft)
- Highest elevation: 378 m (1,240 ft)
- Lowest elevation: −1 m (−3.3 ft)

Population (2024 census)
  - Total: 98,170
  - Density: 294.3/km^{2} (762.3/sq mi)
  - Households: 22,748

Economy
  - Income class: 1st municipal income class
  - Poverty incidence: 24.97% (2023)
  - Revenue: ₱ 60.32 million (2024)
  - Assets: ₱ 1,964 million (2024)
  - Expenditure: ₱ 253 million (2024)
  - Liabilities: ₱ 437.8 million (2024)

Service provider
  - Electricity: Cebu 3 Electric Cooperative (CEBECO 3)
- Time zone: UTC+8 (PST)
- ZIP code: 6041
- PSGC: 0702208000
- IDD : area code: +63 (0)32
- Native languages: Cebuano; Tagalog

Balamban, officially the Municipality of Balamban (Cebuano: Lungsod sa Balamban; Hiligaynon: Banwa sang Balamban; Tagalog: Bayan ng Balamban), is a municipality in the province of Cebu, Philippines. According to the 2024 census, it has a population of 98,170 people. Balamban is known for its shipbuilding industry.

== History ==
There is no exact date which can be ascertained as the establishment date for the settlement of Balamban.

According to oral history, a polity called Balambang was part of a pre-Hispanic monarchy called Hinulawan located in the present Balamban barangay of Nangka.

A Spanish document attests that the community was recognized as a town during Spanish colonial period. The first administrator of the pueblo was Ciriaco Gutierrez, a Spanish captain who was appointed in 1857. The first native Filipino to hold the position was Macario Montejo which was followed by other natives including Fermin Ricafort.

As per a document dated May 2, 1878 from the Archive Division, Bureau of Records Management, the pueblo (now municipality) of Asturias was created from the pueblos of Balamban and Tuburan.

According to oral history, the construction of the St. Francis of Assisi Parish was initiated by a priest in 1875. He oversaw the parish until 1909.

On March 17, 1957, the Douglas C-47 which carried then-president Ramon Magsaysay crashed in Mount Manunggal. A monument was erected at the site which is now considered historical site ever since.

The Cebu Transcentral Highway was constructed in the 1990s improving the accessibility of Balamban with Cebu City.

== Geography ==
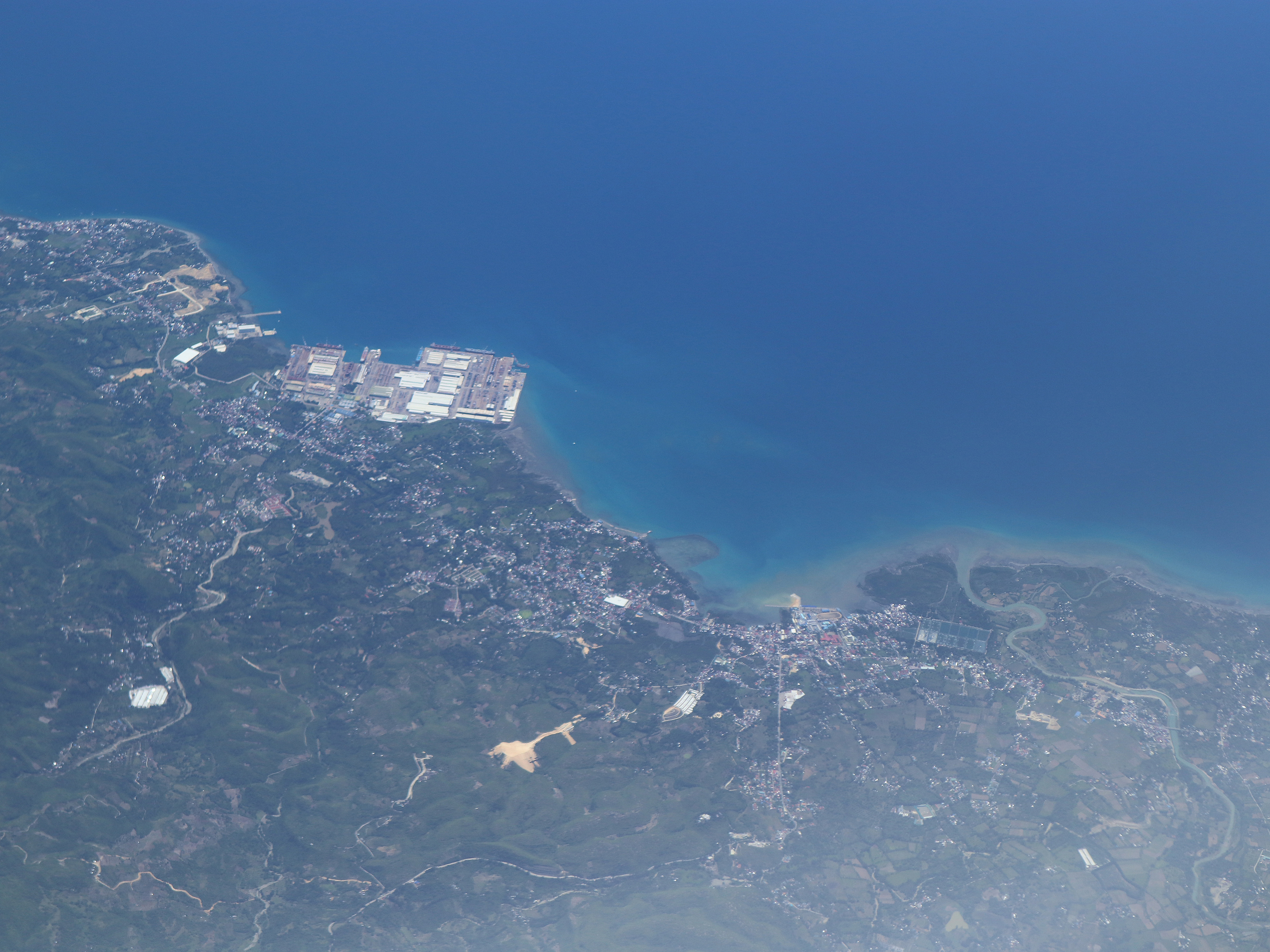
Aerial view of Balamban

Balamban is bordered to the north by the town of Asturias, to the west is the Tañon Strait, to the east is Cebu City, and to the south is the City of Toledo. It is 49 kilometers (30 mi) from Cebu City.

=== Barangays ===
Balamban is politically subdivided into 28 barangays. Each barangay consists of puroks and some have sitios.

PSGC	Barangay	Population			±% p.a.	
		2024		2010		
072208001	Abucayan	5.4%	5,315	4,591	▴	1.02%
072208002	Aliwanay	3.3%	3,277	3,186	▴	0.20%
072208003	Arpili	6.4%	6,312	4,877	▴	1.81%
072208027	Baliwagan (Poblacion)	5.6%	5,494	4,734	▴	1.04%
072208004	Bayong	0.9%	861	1,037	▾	−1.29%
072208005	Biasong	2.9%	2,816	2,155	▴	1.88%
072208006	Buanoy	12.3%	12,057	8,368	▴	2.57%
072208007	Cabagdalan	0.9%	842	698	▴	1.31%
072208008	Cabasiangan	1.3%	1,233	1,078	▴	0.94%
072208009	Cambuhawe	3.4%	3,374	2,916	▴	1.02%
072208010	Cansomoroy	2.0%	1,920	1,415	▴	2.15%
072208011	Cantibas	1.4%	1,346	1,084	▴	1.52%
072208012	Cantuod	3.5%	3,426	2,641	▴	1.83%
072208013	Duangan	1.4%	1,334	1,256	▴	0.42%
072208014	Gaas	3.1%	3,047	2,812	▴	0.56%
072208015	Ginatilan	1.6%	1,592	1,485	▴	0.49%
072208016	Hingatmonan	1.3%	1,241	973	▴	1.71%
072208017	Lamesa	1.8%	1,799	1,656	▴	0.58%
072208018	Liki	1.3%	1,243	1,212	▴	0.18%
072208019	Luca	1.4%	1,399	761	▴	4.33%
072208020	Matun‑og	1.0%	1,002	693	▴	2.60%
072208021	Nangka	6.3%	6,151	4,420	▴	2.33%
072208022	Pondol	10.1%	9,872	7,897	▴	1.56%
072208023	Prenza	3.0%	2,906	2,285	▴	1.69%
072208026	Santa Cruz-Santo Niño (Poblacion)	1.9%	1,866	1,698	▴	0.66%
072208024	Singsing	1.9%	1,870	1,462	▴	1.73%
072208025	Sunog (Magsaysay)	1.9%	1,825	1,998	▾	−0.63%
072208026	Vito	2.0%	1,939	1,849	▴	0.33%
	Total		98,170	71,237	▴	2.26%

=== Climate ===
Climate data for Balamban, Cebu
Month	Jan	Feb	Mar	Apr	May	Jun	Jul	Aug	Sep	Oct	Nov	Dec	Year
Mean daily maximum °C (°F)	28 (82)	29 (84)	30 (86)	31 (88)	31 (88)	30 (86)	30 (86)	30 (86)	30 (86)	29 (84)	29 (84)	28 (82)	30 (85)
Mean daily minimum °C (°F)	23 (73)	23 (73)	23 (73)	24 (75)	25 (77)	25 (77)	25 (77)	25 (77)	25 (77)	25 (77)	24 (75)	23 (73)	24 (75)
Average precipitation mm (inches)	70 (2.8)	49 (1.9)	62 (2.4)	78 (3.1)	138 (5.4)	201 (7.9)	192 (7.6)	185 (7.3)	192 (7.6)	205 (8.1)	156 (6.1)	111 (4.4)	1,639 (64.6)
Average rainy days	13.4	10.6	13.1	14.5	24.2	27.9	28.4	27.7	27.1	27.4	22.5	15.9	252.7
Source: Meteoblue (modeled/calculated data, not measured locally)

== Demographics ==
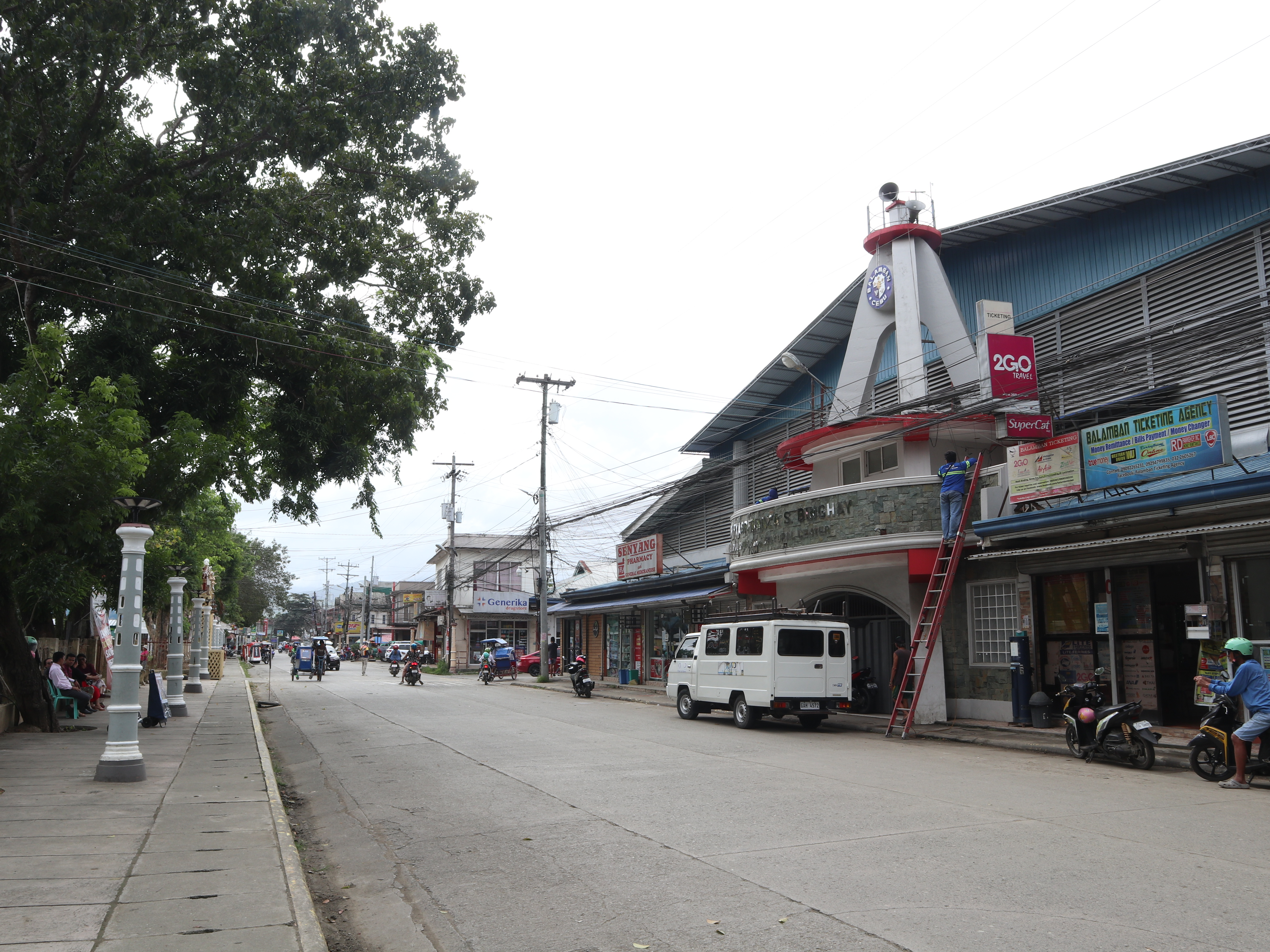
Town center

Population census of Balamban
Year	Pop.	±% p.a.
1903	10,603	—
1918	18,943	+3.94%
1939	31,385	+2.43%
1948	34,488	+1.05%
1960	38,081	+0.83%
1970	36,416	−0.45%
1975	37,351	+0.51%
1980	41,498	+2.13%
1990	45,909	+1.02%
1995	49,983	+1.61%
2000	59,922	+3.96%
2007	66,261	+1.40%
2010	71,237	+2.67%
2015	87,177	+3.92%
2020	95,136	+1.86%
2024	98,170	+0.76%
Source: Philippine Statistics Authority

== Economy ==
Poverty incidence of Balamban

Source: Philippine Statistics Authority

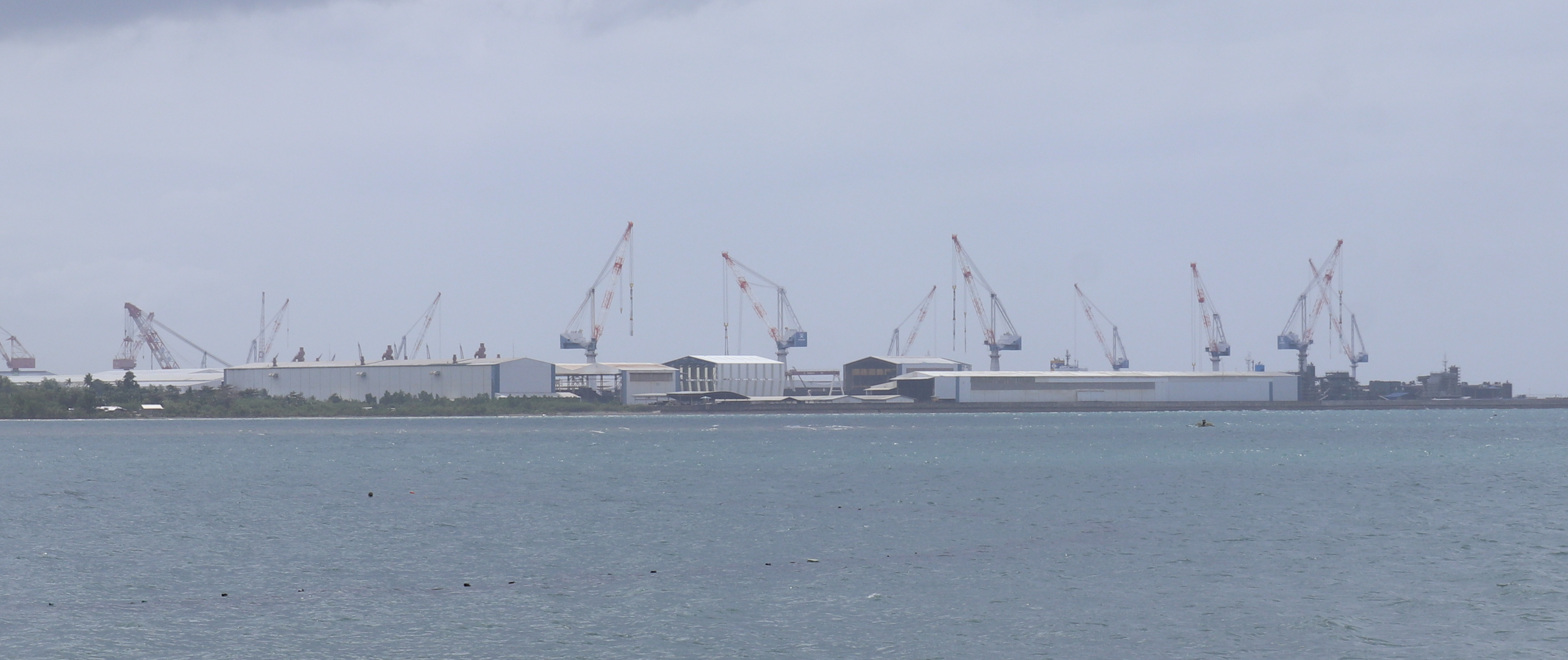
Tsuneishi Shipbuilding's Cebu shipyard in Balamban.

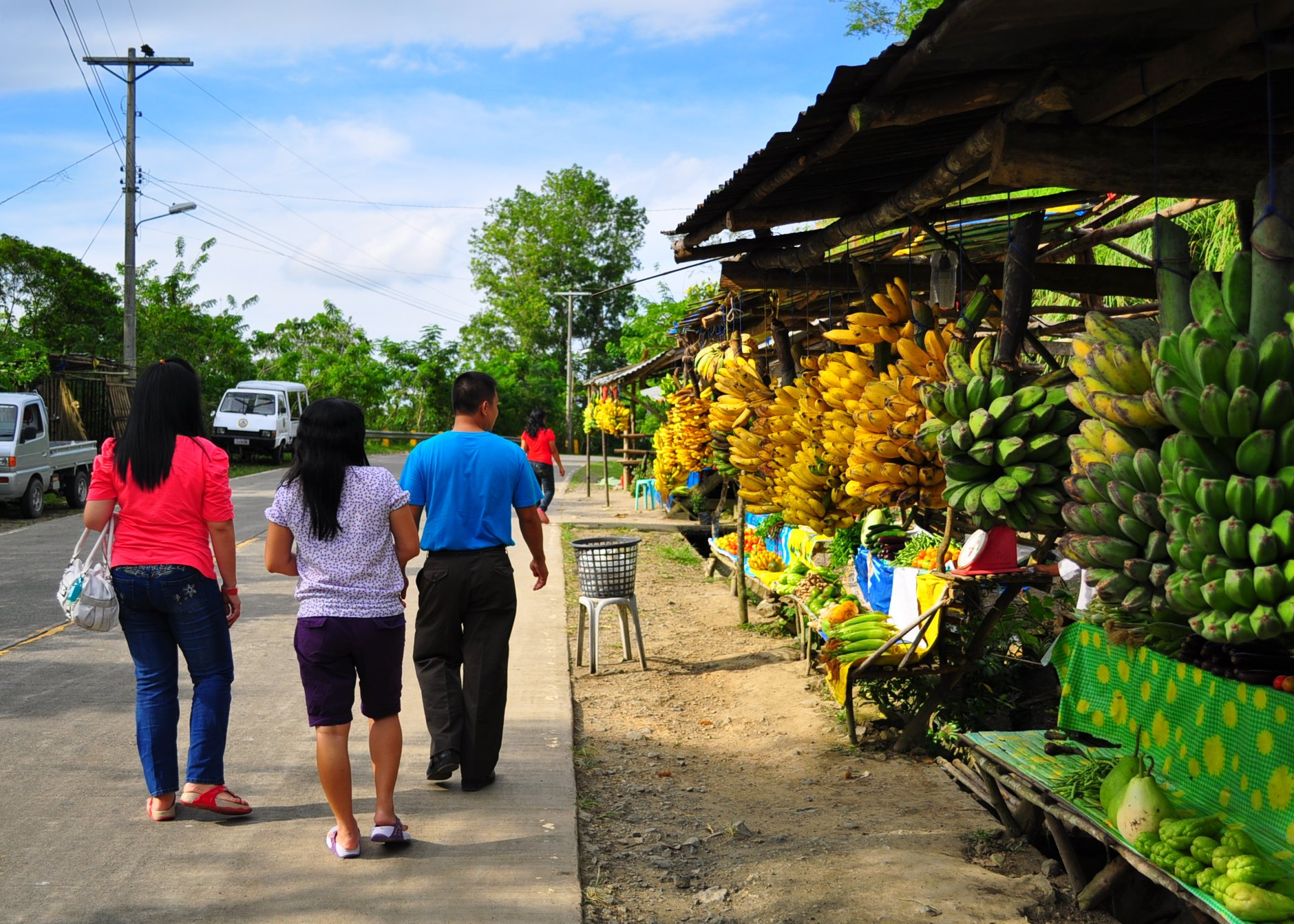
A fruit stall in Balamban

Shipbuilding is a major industry of the town of Balamban since the 1990s. Among the prominent firms with shipyards in the town is Austal Philippines, Tsuneishi and Metaphil at the West Cebu Industrial Park.

Farming is another source of livelihood for residents with corn, crops and vegetables among the important crops. The municipality is also the only source of abaca fibers in Cebu produced in a 260-to-300-hectare (640-to-740-acre) plantation in Mount Manunggal in barangay Magsaysay. With the elevation of 500 metres (1,600 ft) above sea level, Magsaysay is ideal for abaca cultivation.

Cannabis has also been illicitly cultivated in Magsaysay and other mountainous barangays of Balamban which is discouraged by the government and has encouraged farmers to grow alternative crops including abaca.

== Government ==
The following were the mayors of Balamban:

- Eufracio Yntig (1945–1946)
- Rizalina Migallos (1947–1955)
- Exasperanza Sanchez-Binghay (1955 – 1967)
- Socrates Gonzalez (1967–1986)
- Vicenta Dumdum (OIC; 1986–1987)
- Jose Narvios Jr. (March–June 1998)

- Alex Binghay (1988–1998)
- Marcelo Ike Pilapil (1998–2001)
- Alex Binghay (2001–2010)
- Ace Stefan Binghay (2010–2019)
- Alex Binghay (2019–2022)
- Ace Stefan Binghay (2022–2025)
