= Pewit Island (Portsmouth Harbour) =

Island in Portsmouth Harbour, Hampshire, England

Coordinates: 50°49′52″N 1°08′13″W

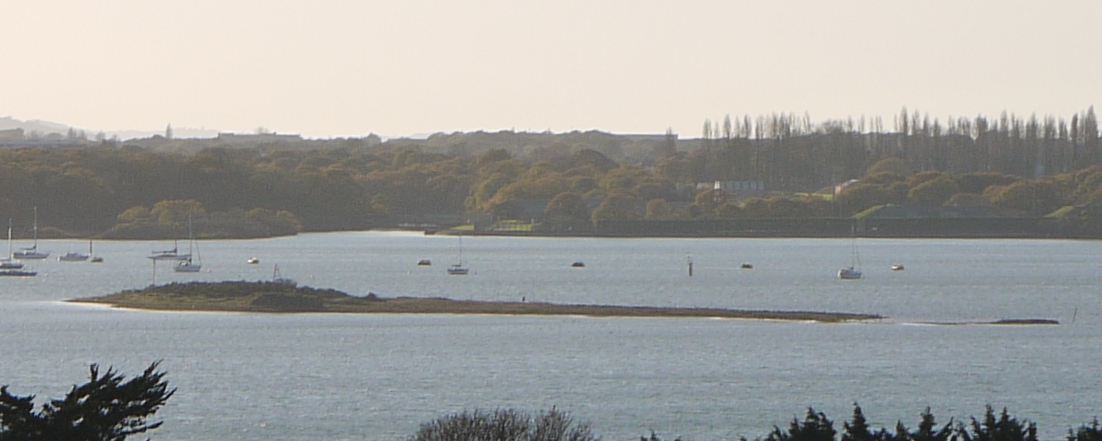
Pewit Island with the tide in

Pewit Island is a small island in England located in the northwestern section of Portsmouth Harbour.

Historically it appears to have been connected to the mainland via a manmade shingle causeway, parts of which still exist. The island has been colonised by oak and blackthorn scrub and is home to species including sea lavender and golden samphire plants. The island is currently a Hampshire and Isle of Wight Wildlife Trust nature reserve.

In 1857 plans drawn up to improve the defences of Portsmouth included building a fortification on the island. The plans were later modified in the face of improved artillery technology and the fortification was never built.
