= Wight Ryder II =

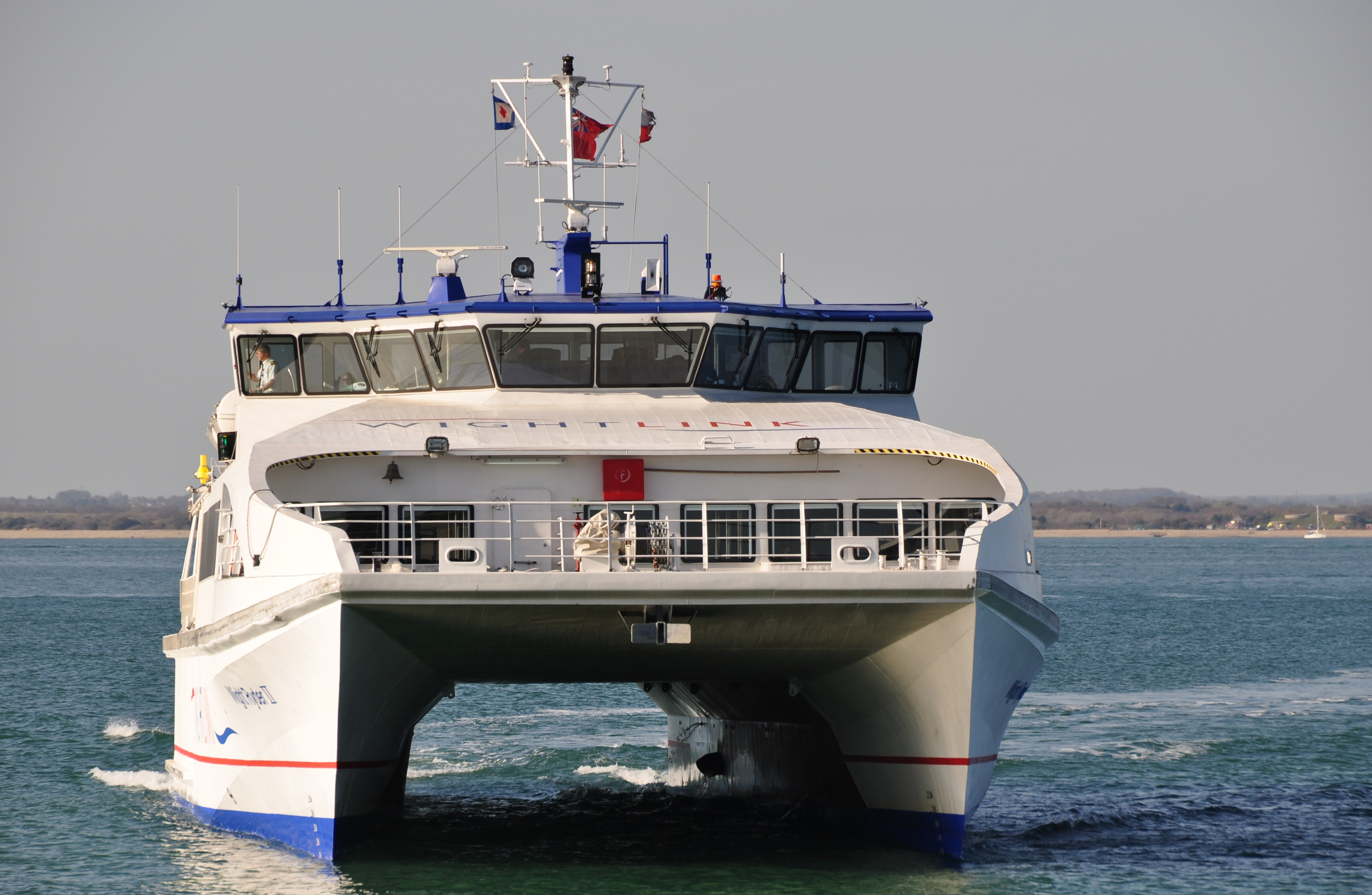
- Wight Ryder II in April 2012

History

England
- Name: Wight Ryder II
- Operator: Wightlink
- Port of registry: Portsmouth
- Route: Ryde to Portsmouth
- Builder: FBMA, Philippines
- Launched: 30 April 2009
- In service: 29 September 2009
- Identification: IMO number: 9512549; MMSI number: 235069877; Callsign: 2BWG7
- Status: Operational

General characteristics
- Tonnage: 520 GT
- Length: 41 metres (135 ft)
- Beam: 12 metres (39 ft)
- Draught: 1.60 metres (5 ft 3 in)
- Installed power: Caterpillar C32
- Speed: 26.7 knots (49.4 km/h; 30.7 mph)
- Capacity: 260 passengers

Wight Ryder II is one of two high-speed passenger catamarans operated by Wightlink on the Ryde to Portsmouth route.

Built by FBMA in Cebu in The Philippines, with sister ship Wight Ryder I, it replaced FastCat Ryde and FastCat Shanklin in September 2009.
