= Tsuneishi Cebu Shipyard =

Shipyard in the Philippines

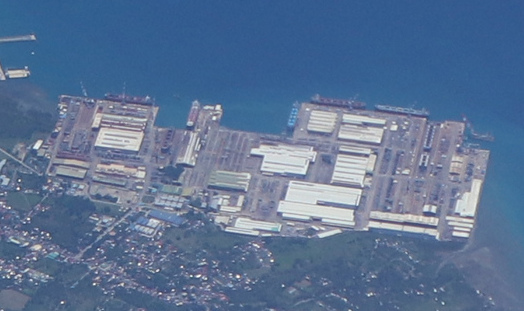
- Interactive map of Tsuneishi Cebu Shipyard

Location
- Country: Philippines
- Location: West Cebu Industrial Park, Balamban, Cebu
- Coordinates: 10°28′30.7″N 123°41′34.2″E

Details
- Opened: 1995
- Operated by: Tsuneishi Heavy Industries (Cebu)

Statistics
- Website www.thici.com

Tsuneishi Heavy Industries (Cebu), Inc. maintains a shipyard in Balamban, Cebu, Philippines.

== History ==
Tsuneishi Heavy Industries (Cebu), Inc. or THI as a corporation was established in September 1994 as a joint venture between Japanese firm Tsuneishi Shipbuilding and Cebu-based Aboitiz Group. The groundbreaking for the shipyard in Balamban happened in the same year.

In 1995, the first phase of the shipyard, Slipway No. 1 was completed. THI also acquired two floating docks. The following year the ship repair operations began. In 1997, THI built and delivered its first ship, the 23,000-DWT MV Sea Amelita. In September 16, 1998, THI became a PEZA-registered locator.

Slipway No. 2 was finished in 2004 and inaugurated the following year by then president Gloria Macapagal Arroyo. In May 2009, a building dock was inaugurated.

In August 2024, THI is in the process of expanding it shipyard to accommodate another slipway and building dock.

In January 2026, the Brave Pioneer, the Philippines’ first methanol dual-fueled bulk carrier ship, was inaugurated at the shipyard.

== Facilities ==
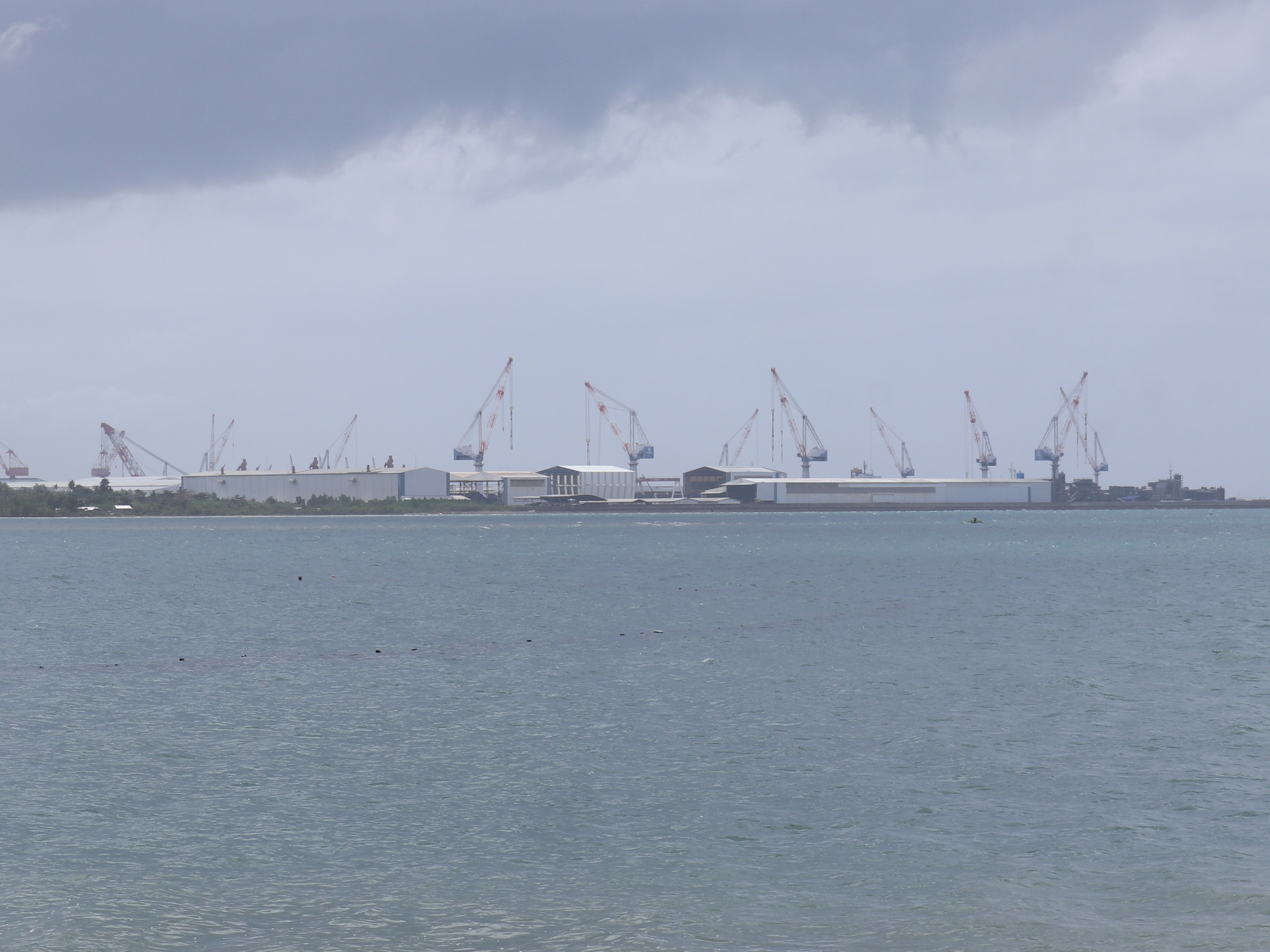
Tsuneishi's shipyard in Cebu

	Dimensions	Main cranes
Slipway No. 1	215 m × 34 m (705 ft × 112 ft)	Jib crane
Slipway No. 2	250 m × 41 m (820 ft × 135 ft)	Jib crane
Building dock	450 m × 60 m × 11.5 m (1,476 ft × 197 ft × 38 ft)	Jib crane 300tx4 Floating crane 1,300tx1
Source: THI

== See also ==
- Austal Philippines Shipyard
