= Tsuneishi Shipbuilding =

Japanese shipbuilding company

Tsuneishi Shipbuilding Co. Ltd.
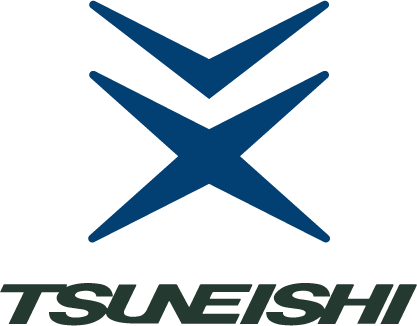
- Industry: Shipbuilding
- Founded: 1917; 109 years ago
- Founder: Katsutaro Kambara
- Headquarters: Fukuyama, Hiroshima, Japan
- Number of locations: 3 main factories (2025)
- Area served: Worldwide
- Products: Ships
- Brands: TESS; Kamsarmax
- Subsidiaries: Tsuneishi Heavy Industries (Cebu), Inc.; Tsuneishi Group (Zhoushan) Shipbuilding Inc.; Astillero Tsuneishi Paraguay
- Website: www.tsuneishi.co.jp

Tsuneishi Shipbuilding Co. Ltd. (常石造船株式会社, Tsuneishi Zōsen Kabushiki Gaisha) is a Japan-based global shipbuilding company.

== History ==
Businessman Katsutaro Kambara founded the Shiohama Dockyard in 1917 at the site of the current Tsuneishi Shipyard. His previous venture was Kambara Kisen Co., Ltd, a shipping firm. The business started with constructing wooden ships. Shiohama was later merged with the Fujii Dockyard and Nishihama Dockyard in the Tuneishi area to formally establish the Tsuneishi Shipbuilding Co. Ltd. in 1942.

After World War II, Tsuneishi shifted to producing steel ships. The first steel ship, the Mikomaru was built in 1958.

In 1968, Tuneishi finished its 200,000-metric-ton repair facility. The company introduced its first standardized carrier design, the Tsuneishi Economical Standard Ship (TESS). It started with the TESS40 series in 1984. By 2026, the design was used in 600 ships of various sizes.

Tsuneishi established a shipyard in Balamban, Cebu in 1994 in the Philippines. In 2003, the company established another shipyard in Zhongshan, China.

The company then introduced another flagship product, the Kamsarmax bulker series in 2005. It is named after Port Kamsar since it spans the maximum length that could enter the seaport in Guinea.

In October 2008, Astillero Tsuneishi Paraguay (ATP) in Paraguay was formed. In 2011, ATP began building river transport vehicles.

In 2025, Tsuneishi took over all the stakes of the shipbuilding division of Mitsui E&S

== Shipyards ==
Shipyard	Company	Location
Tsuneishi Factory (Main)	—N/a	Fukuyama, Hiroshima, Japan
Cebu Shipyard	Tsuneishi Heavy Industries (Cebu), Inc.	Balamban, Cebu, Philippines
TZS Shipyard	Tsuneishi Group (Zhoushan) Shipbuilding Inc.	Zhoushan, Zhejiang, China
