= Five Stars Fujian =

Bulk carrier ship

Five Stars Fujian is a bulk carrier launched in 2009. In May 2016, it was stranded off Gladstone in Queensland, Australia. It was carrying $40 million AUD of coal and the crew of the ship lacked food, fuel and wages for the return to China.

The vessel was detained from July to September 2016. After it was lifted, the vessel was banned from returning to Australian ports for 12 months. Australian Maritime Safety Authority General Manager of Ship Safety Allan Schwartz stated: “The crew of the Five Stars Fujian have been forsaken off the Australian coast for over two months, with limited supplies and thousands of dollars of unpaid wages. This is a completely unacceptable way for a company to treat their crew and this kind of conduct will not be tolerated in Australia.”

The vessel was to be auctioned on Taobao in May 2018. It was detained at Fengchenggang port in Guangxi.
