= Severn Link =

British ferry operator

Severn Link Cyswllt Hafren Kevren Havren
- Severn Link logo

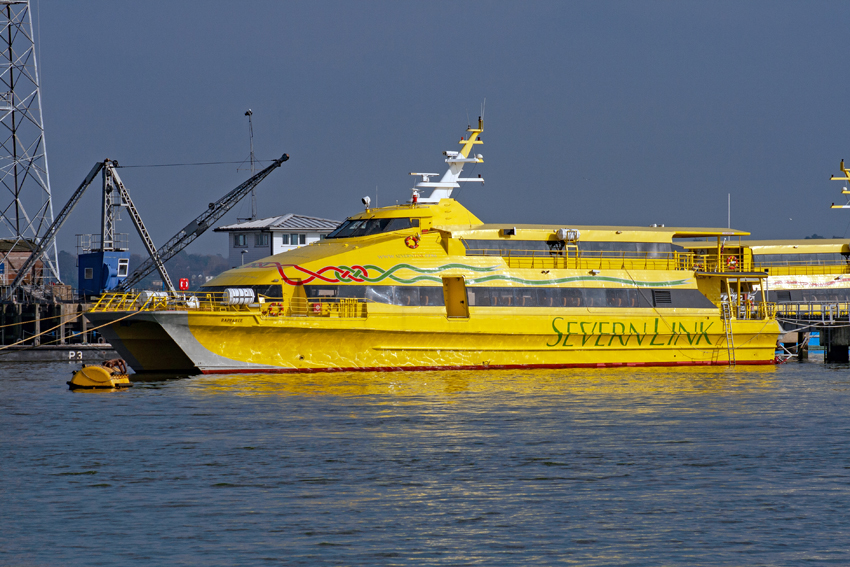
- Fast ferry Rapparee at Marchwood.
- Locale: Devon and Wales
- Waterway: Bristol Channel
- Transit type: Passenger ferry
- No. of lines: 1 (proposed)
- No. of vessels: 2
- No. of terminals: 2
- Website: Official website

Severn Link was a ferry operating company founded in 2010 that intended to provide ferry services across the Bristol Channel in England and Wales. The route was to have been served by two ex-Wightlink 40 metre "Fastcat" passenger ferries capable of running at 34 knots and carrying up to 360 seated passengers. The journey by ferry was expected to take around 50 minutes, compared to 3.5 hours by road.

The first route was planned to be a passenger service between Ilfracombe and Swansea, to start at Easter 2010, but a major investor who held the mortgages on the two catamarans pulled out, and talks to find a new investor were still ongoing in autumn 2010 with launch said to be delayed until 2011.

Later plans were for a ferry service linking Ilfracombe with Cardiff, docking at Penarth. Severn Link were planning on a more direct link whereby the ferry would dock in Cardiff, and the company said that it was considering other ferry services between Penarth and Minehead, and between Porthcawl and Ilfracombe.

In 2012 the company confirmed that although the withdrawal of an investor and problems with landing facilities had led to delays, and the two catamarans had been sold, there were still plans to start a service. In 2018 it was indicated that plans for a ferry service were "still very much on the cards". In 2021 a Devon MP called for the proposal to proceed.
