= Alien (shipping company) =

Russian shipping company

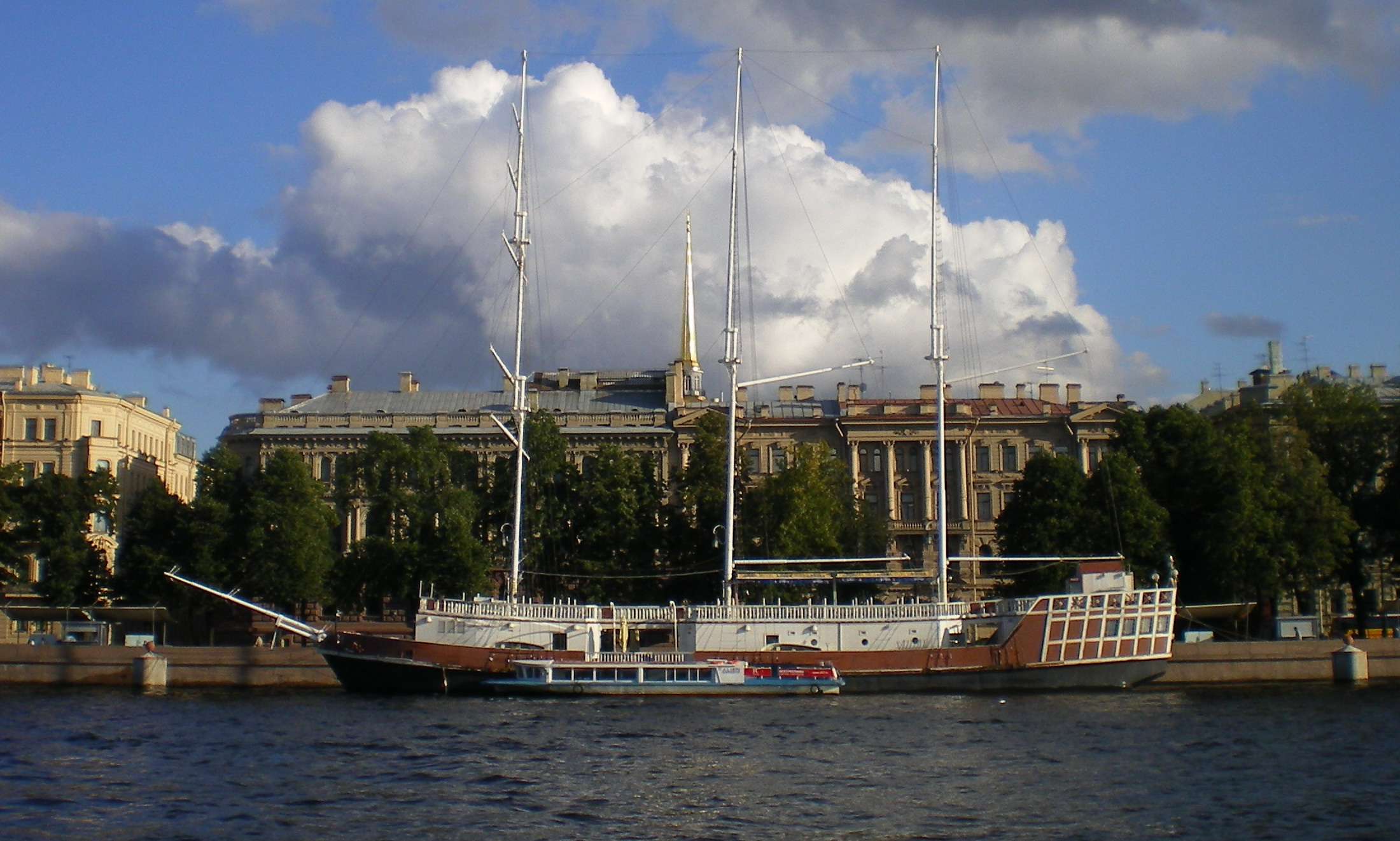
- Native name: Russian: Элиен
- Company type: Public limited company
- Industry: Tourism
- Founded: October 1, 1999
- Headquarters: St. Petersburg, Russia
- Number of locations: 22 river boats
- Area served: Ladoga Lake, Neva river, Neva Bay
- Production output: River cruises
- Services: Tourism Ferry
- Website: www.alienship.ru

Alien is a Russian company that owns and maintains passenger services and moored vessels in and around St. Petersburg. The company operates 22 boats, including hydrofoils, and the three-masted frigate Kronverk, maintained as a restaurant.

== Facts ==
This company has been operating since October 1999.

As a result of the 2008–2009 Russian financial crisis and changes in the economy during 2008 and 2009, the company has been compelled to look for new investment opportunities. Primarily, this involved establishing a hydrofoil service between Peter and Paul Fortress and Oreshek's fortress. Prior to this the route was served by slower vessels.

By the end of the summer tourist season of 2009 the company had amassed heavy financial losses and creditors compelled the sale of six boats, for a total sum of about 26 million roubles.
