= Austal Philippines Shipyard =

Shipyard in the Philippines

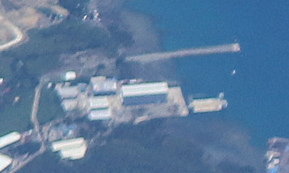

Location
- Country: Philippines
- Location: West Cebu Industrial Park, Balamban, Cebu
- Coordinates: 10°27′46.3″N 123°41′18.9″E

Details
- Opened: 1997
- Operated by: 1997–2009: FBM Aboitiz Marine; 2011–present: Austal
- Size: 120,000 m^{2} (1,300,000 sq ft) (land area)

Statistics
- Website philippines.austal.com

The Austal Philippines Shipyard is a shipyard in Balamban, Cebu, Philippines ran by the Philippine subsidiary of Australian firm Austal. It is one of the shipyards operating in the municipality.

== History ==
=== Under FBMA (1997–2009) ===
The Austal Philippines Shipyard was formerly operated by FBM Aboitiz (FBMA) Marine Inc. The groundbreaking took place in mid-1996.

The shipyard itself was established in 1997. It was the first facility in the Visayas where fast-craft catamarans were built. The first ever ship built was the Tricat, a passenger ferry which served Hong Kong and Macau. FBMA is a joint venture established in that year by local firm Aboitiz and Co. and Hong Kong-based Parkview Group. The stakes was later sold to British firm Babcock International.

Aboitiz and Co. acquired full ownership of FBMA in 2004.

However, FBMA was affected by the 2008 financial crisis. The last vessel FBMA delivered was for an operator based in New Caledonia. The ship left the facility in September 2008. In 2009, the shipyard was closed due to decreased demand for ships. FBMA delivered 22 vessels for clients in other parts of Asia, Europe, the United States, and Oceania.

=== Under Austal (2011–present) ===
Austal acquired the shipyard from FBMA in 2011. By 2019, Austal has been able to build and deliver 17 commercial ships.

== See also ==
- Tsuneishi Cebu Shipyard
