= Portsmouth Harbour =

Natural harbour in Hampshire, England

- Site of Special Scientific Interest
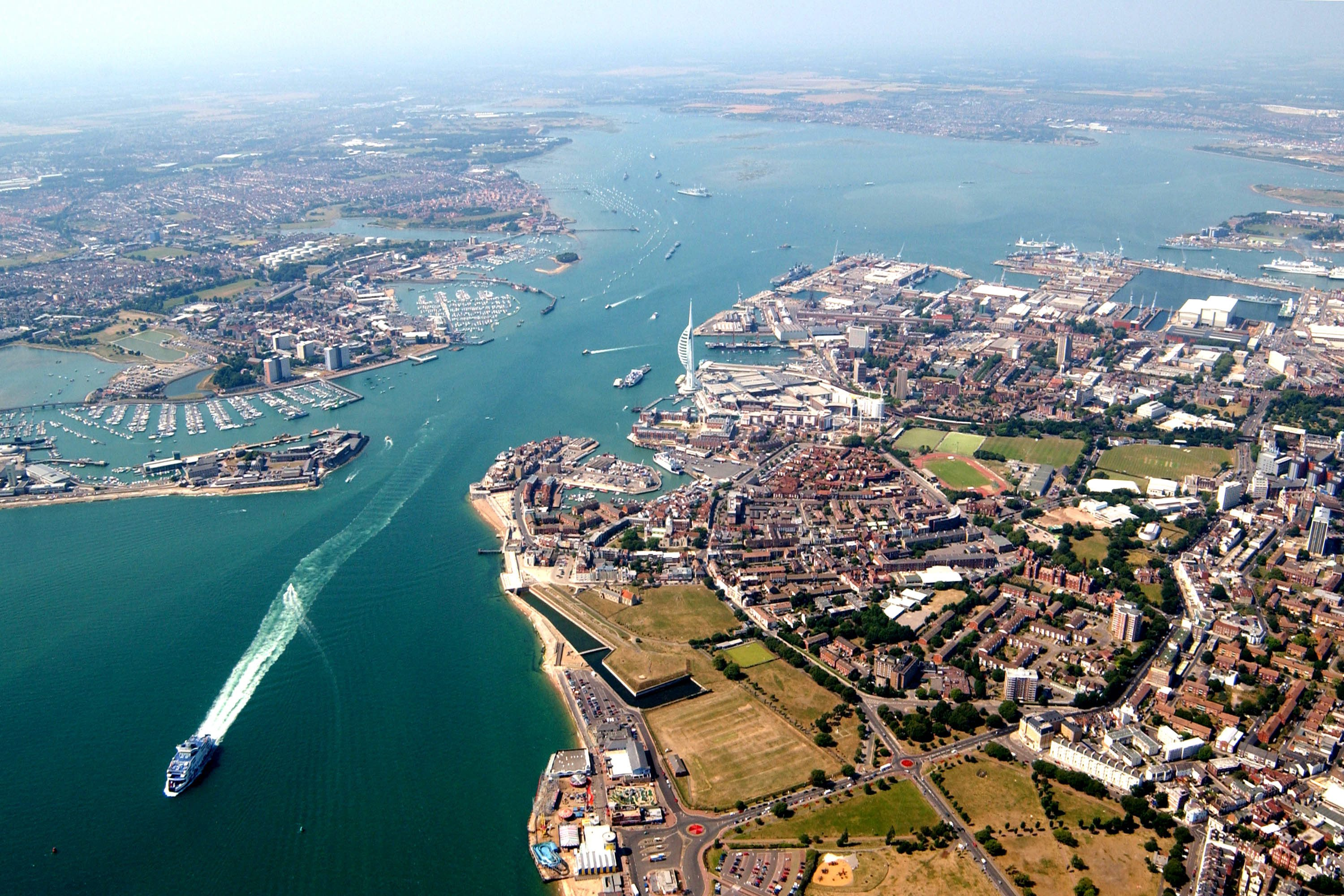
- Aerial view from the south-east
- Location of Portsmouth Harbour.
- Area of search: Hampshire
- Grid reference: SU 617 034
- Interest: Biological
- Area: 1,264.2 hectares (3,124 acres)
- Notification date: 1992
- Location map: Magic Map

Portsmouth Harbour is a large natural harbour between Portsmouth and Gosport in Hampshire, England, covering an area of 12.6 km^{2} (4.9 sq mi). It is a biological Site of Special Scientific Interest, a Ramsar site and a Special Protection Area.

An 18th-century panorama of Portsmouth Harbour, depicting British men-of-war and other shipping

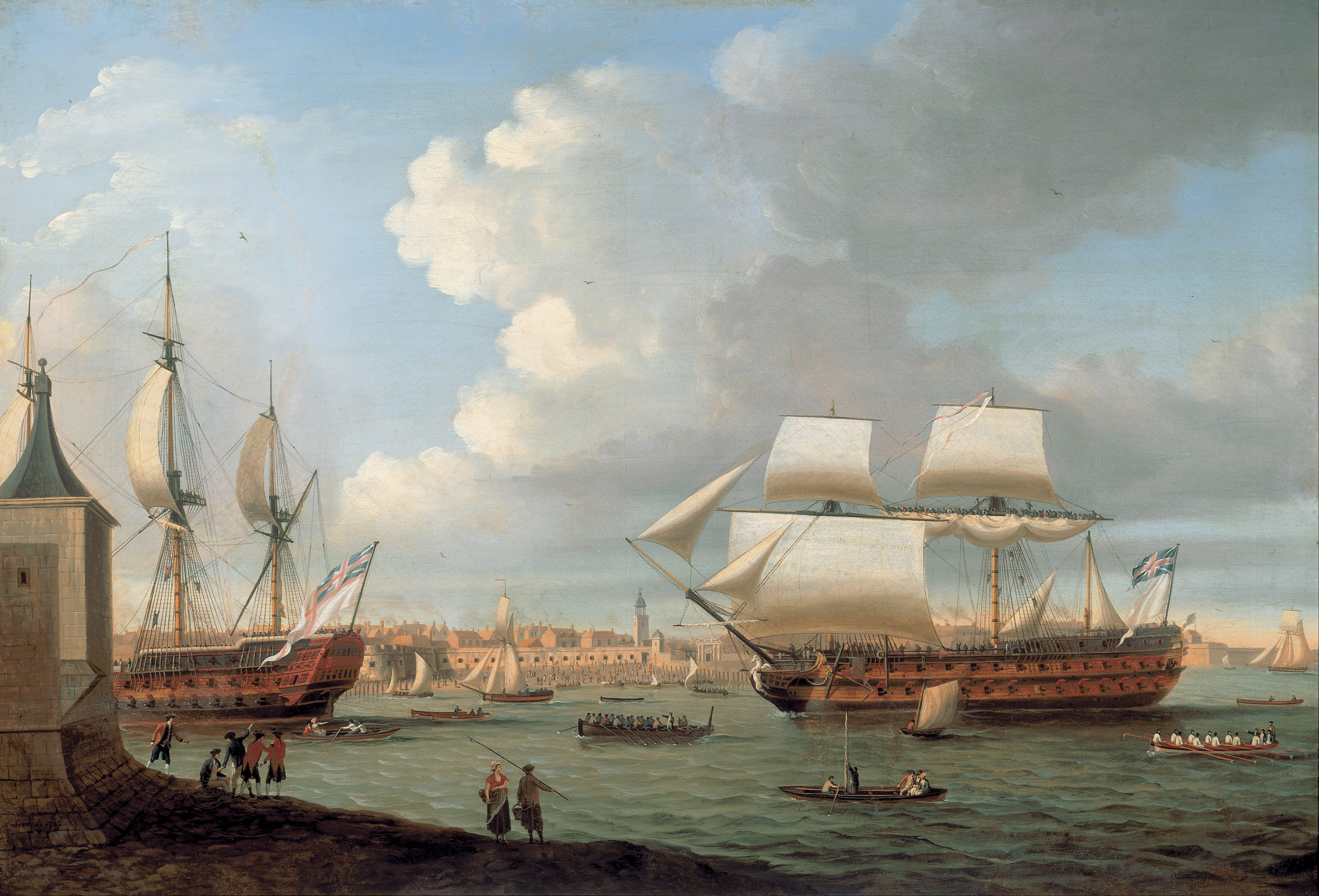
HMS Foudroyant (left) towing the captured French ship Pégase into Portsmouth Harbour on 30 April 1782

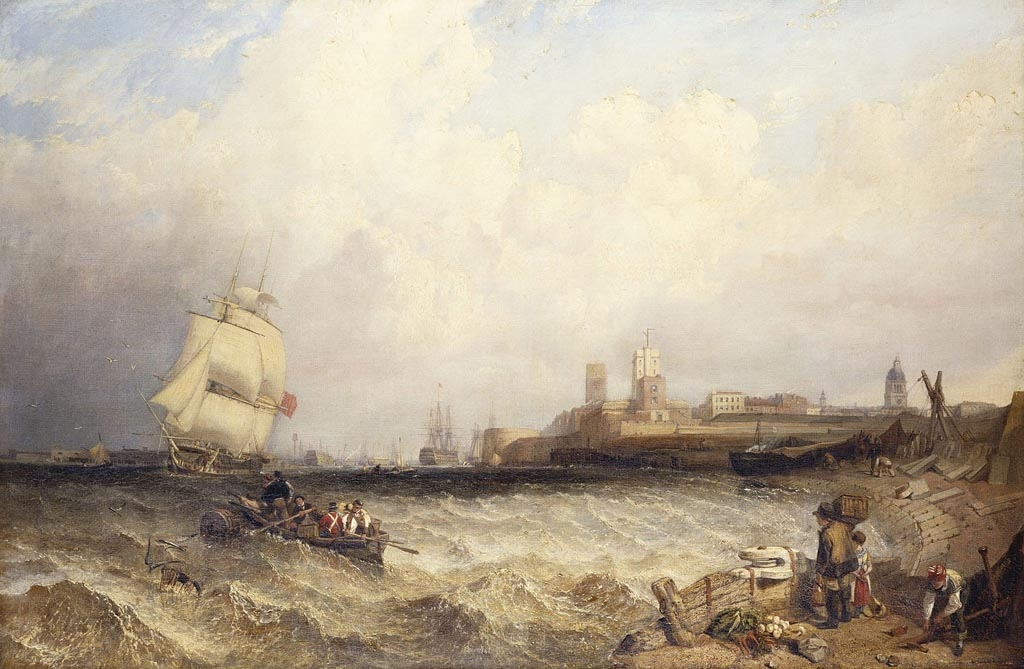
Portsmouth Harbour by Clarkson Stanfield, 1831

The harbour's mouth opens into the Solent. Geographically, the harbour is a ria: formerly it was the valley of a stream flowing from Portsdown into the Solent. At its north end is Portchester Castle, of Roman origin and the first fortress built to protect the harbour.

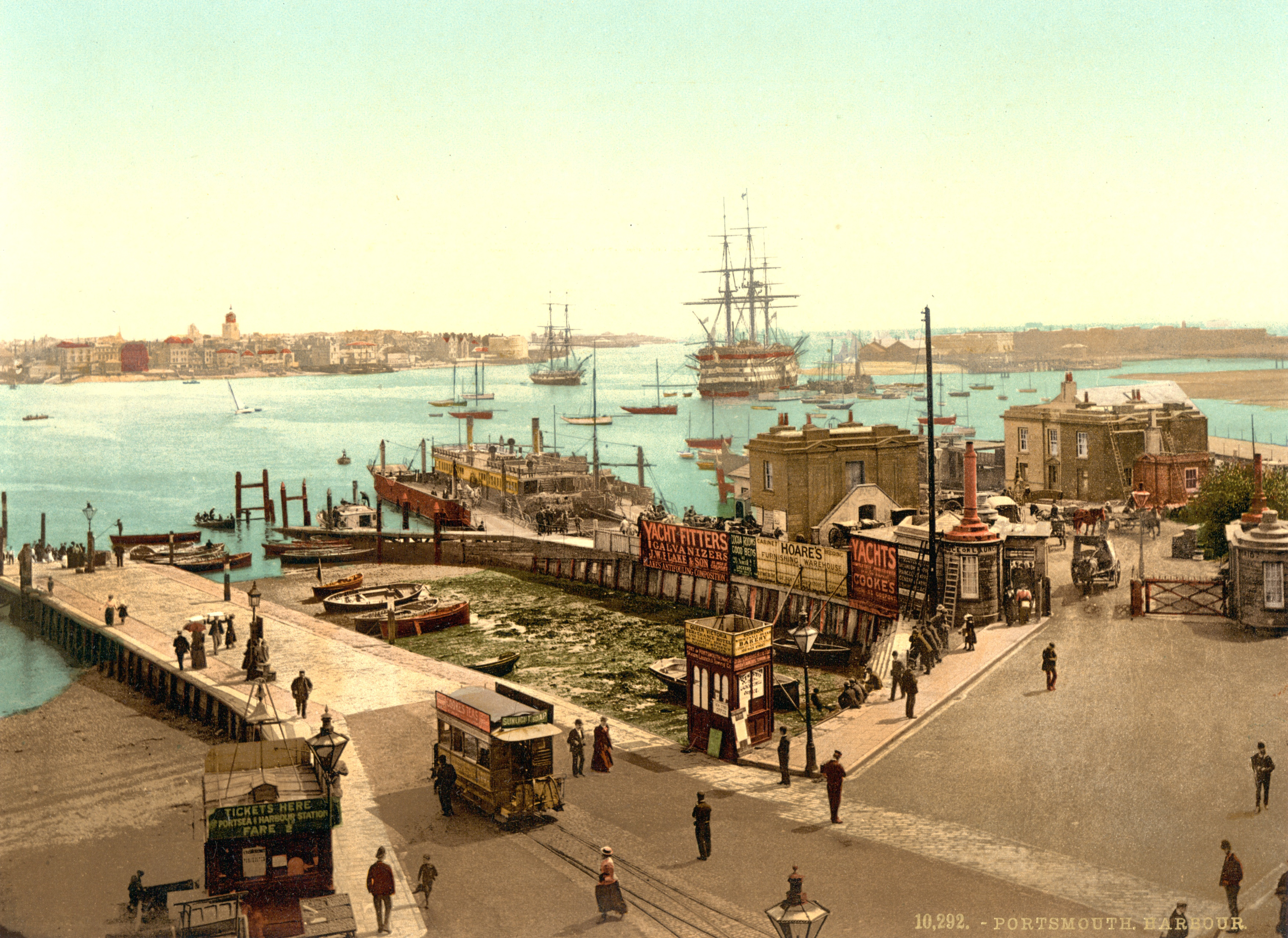
The lower end of Portsmouth harbour at the end of the 19th century

The harbour is best known as the home of the Royal Navy, HMNB Portsmouth. Because of its strategic location on the south coast of England, protected by the natural defence of the Isle of Wight, it has since the Middle Ages been the home to England's (and later Britain's) navy. The narrow entrance, and the forts surrounding it gave it a considerable advantage of being virtually impregnable to attack from the sea. Before the fortifications were built the French burned Portsmouth in 1338. During the civil war parliamentary forces were able to carry out a successful cutting-out expedition within the harbour and capture the six-gunned Henrietta Marie.

In modern times, the harbour has become a major commercial ferry port, with regular services to Bilbao, Santander, Caen, Cherbourg, St Malo, Le Havre, The Channel Islands and the Isle of Wight. There is also a passenger ferry to Gosport. The international ferry port also saw a cruise terminal expansion in 2012 and sees regular cruise ship operations. It is also a major area for leisure sailing. In 2001 the Gunwharf Quays development, was opened on the site of HMS Vernon (a former naval shore establishment).

== Islands ==
Portsmouth Harbour contains a number of islands. Whale Island is the home of the training establishment HMS Excellent. Horsea Island is now connected to the mainland due to land reclamation. It is also part of HMS Excellent. Pewit Island is a small island located in the north western section of Portsmouth Harbour. Closer to the harbour entrance on the Gosport side is Burrow Island, also known as Rat Island.

== Camber Dock ==
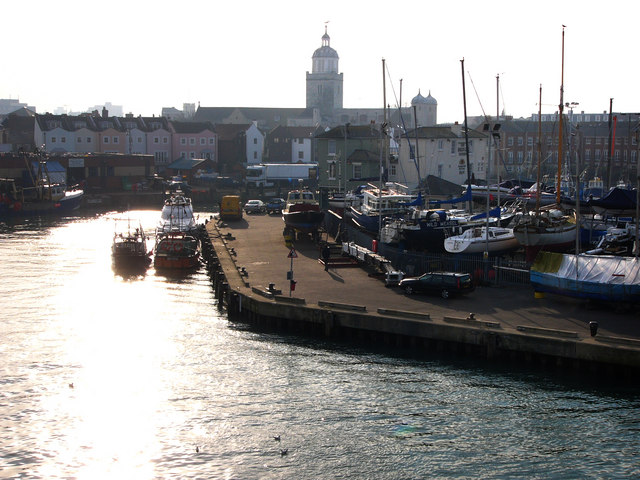
The historic Camber Dock and Camber Quay, February 2008

50.791645°N 1.106565°W
Camber Dock is the oldest developed part of the Portsmouth Harbour complex. Lying within the historic area of Old Portsmouth, it is part of Portsmouth Point that lies outside the original fortified boundaries of Portsmouth. After improvements in the King James's and Landport Gates and the areas military defences, civilian building of dockside storage and ancillary servicing facilities began from 1590. With major ships anchored at Spithead, from the 18th century the surrounding area became noted as a popular but lewd area for visiting sailors.

With advent of bigger steam powered ships, the physical restrictions of Camber Dock meant that it was bypassed for the larger capacity of the newer developed Portsmouth Harbour. Resultantly, Camber Quay became the home of the local fishing fleet, which it still remains today, together with the adjacent dockside development of the commercial fish market. Today it also has a series of visiting berths for non-commercial craft. In 2015, the Land Rover BAR yacht racing headquarters was completed.

== Portsmouth ferry port ==
=== Launch ===
Portsmouth investigated three locations for a ferry port at the end of the 1960s and the current location was chosen. The choice was based on cost and the likely benefit of cross-channel ferries. The site was at the end of the newly constructed M275. Originally built with two berths the site opened in 1976 with the Earl William (Sealink) running to the Channel Islands, the Viking Victory (Townsend Thoresen) running to Cherbourg and the Brittany Ferries running to Saint-Malo.

=== Expansion ===
All three operators increased their usage of the port during the mid-eighties, which led to expansion. An additional two berths were built, both twin tier. Berth 2 was filled and a new Berth 2 built, which was mainly used by the Earl Granville (Sealink) running to both the Channel Islands and Cherbourg, Berth 1 become more tight to use and the newly roll-on, roll-off Commodore Shipping used it for their Channel Island freight services. Berth 3 was left incomplete while Berth 4 was finished. This was generally considered the Brittany Ferries berth. When Berth 3 was finished Townsend Thoresen moved their passenger operation entirely from Southampton to Portsmouth. Shortly afterwards, Townsend Thoresen bought P&O (Normandy Ferries) and relocated them to Portsmouth. The old Southampton Ferry port was then converted to a marina.

The continued use of Portsmouth saw the creation of Berth 5 and the final stage of development. Portsmouth had seen additional ferry companies Channel Island Ferries, Hoverspeed and Truckline and new routes to Caen, Santander and Bilbao. With the advent of the Channel Tunnel and the abolition of Duty Free most of the companies disappeared. Sealink merged their Channel Island operations with the newly created Channel Island Ferries to create British Channel Island Ferries. They then later relocated operations to Poole before merging into Condor Ferries. Sealink operated to Cherbourg with the Earl Granville for several further years until the Earl Granville violently ran aground off Cherbourg. Hoverspeed ran the HOVERSPEED GB from Portsmouth to Cherbourg intermittently one summer – often the "new ferry of the future" was out of action and the now repaired but ageing Earl Granville would step into the breach – much to passenger annoyance.

=== Decline ===
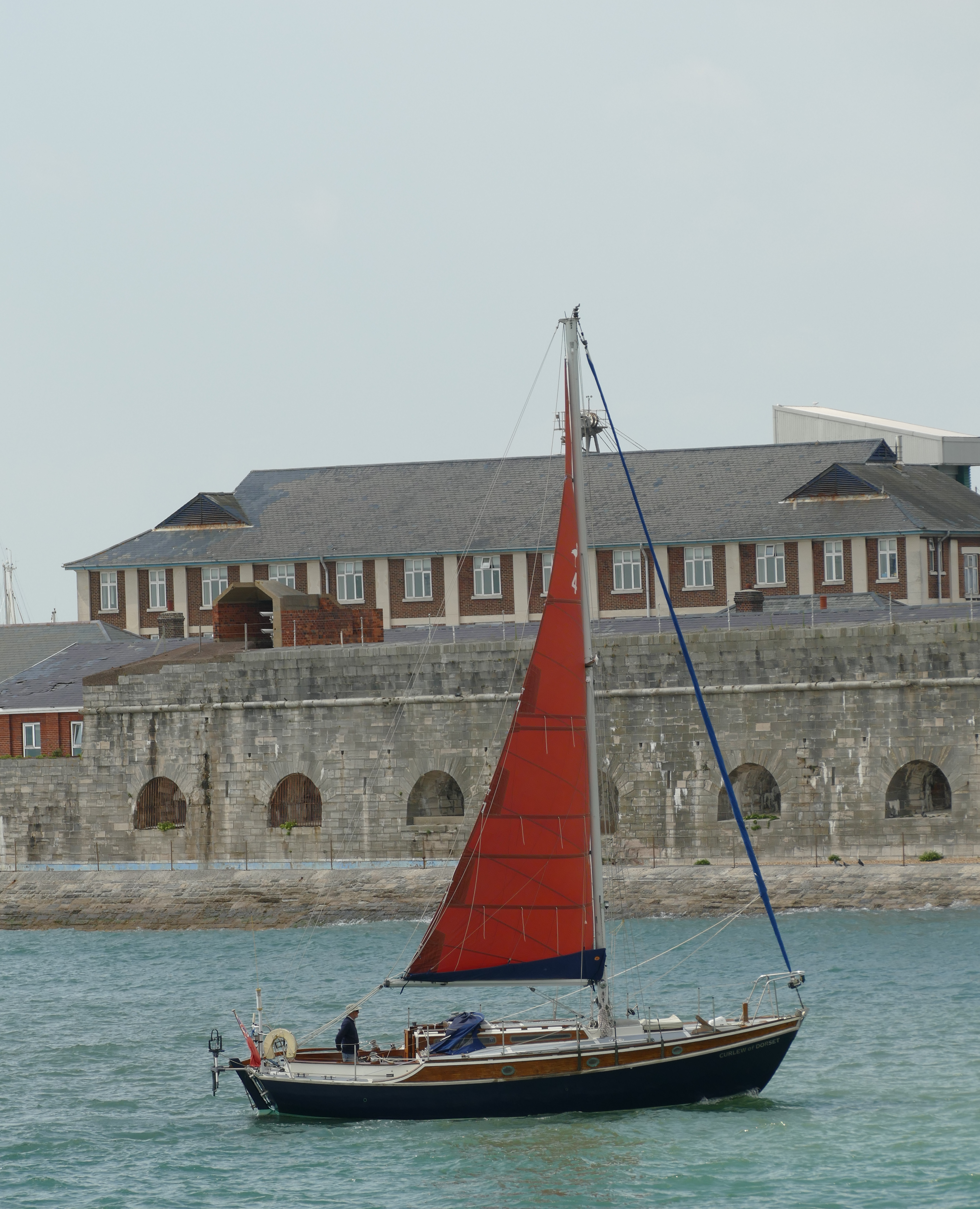
Sailboat entering Portsmouth Harbour, 2017

By 2000 Portsmouth only had ferries from Brittany Ferries, Condor and P&O. P&O replaced the ageing Super Vikings with a Ro-pax ship and a Sea-Cat on the Portsmouth-Cherbourg route, but by 2006 P&O had all but closed its operation from Portsmouth but retained the route to Bilbao and Portsmouth became a quiet port again.

After P&O Ferries withdrawal from the Le Havre route in September 2005 a new company stepped in to replace them with LD Lines running one sailing a day to Le Havre with the Norman Spirit.

The Spanish ferry company Acciona tried briefly in 2006 to compete on the northern Spain route to Bilbao using their ferry the Fortuny, but it lasted 3 months before closure.

=== Today ===
Today, Brittany Ferries operates a three times daily service to Caen, daily to St Malo, daily to Le Havre and offers a high-speed seasonal service to Cherbourg, which runs daily; on Friday, Saturday & Sunday it runs twice daily. Brittany Ferries also has up to six sailings a week to Spain with two departures to Bilbao and four to Santander.

Condor Ferries have two sailings a day to the Channel Islands with a morning sailing to the Islands with the passenger and freight ferry Commodore Clipper and an evening sailing to the islands with the freight-only ferry Commodore Goodwill.

The sole remaining P&O service to Bilbao ceased in September 2010 but has since been replaced by Brittany Ferries as of April 2011 with two sailings a week using their modern and fast ferry Cap Finistere which can make the trip from Portsmouth to Bilbao in 24 hours with a top cruising speed of 27 knots.

On 10 May 2011 the New Terminal building at the newly renamed Portsmouth International Port was opened by Vince Cable MP.

As well as the regular ferry sailings there were 45 cruise ships that called at the port during 2018 with several of them being turnaround calls. Regular calls are undertaken by CMV Cruises, Crystal Cruises, Hapag Lloyd, Phoenix Reisen, Saga Cruises, Viking Ocean Cruises, Windstar Cruises.

The harbour was dredged in 2016 in preparation for the arrival of HMS Queen Elizabeth and HMS Prince of Wales, the Navy's first supercarriers, with regular maintenance dredging taking place at various times of the year.

Portsmouth Harbour, taken from Hardway in Gosport, showing Portsdown Hill in the centre and the city of Portsmouth on the right including the home of the Royal Navy, HMNB Portsmouth.

== Site of Special Scientific Interest ==
Most of the harbour is composed of intertidal mudflats and cordgrass marshes, and they have abundant benthic fauna which provide food for birds. It is of national importance for dark-bellied Brent geese and for three species of waders, grey plover, black-tailed godwit and dunlin.

== Proposed tunnel ==
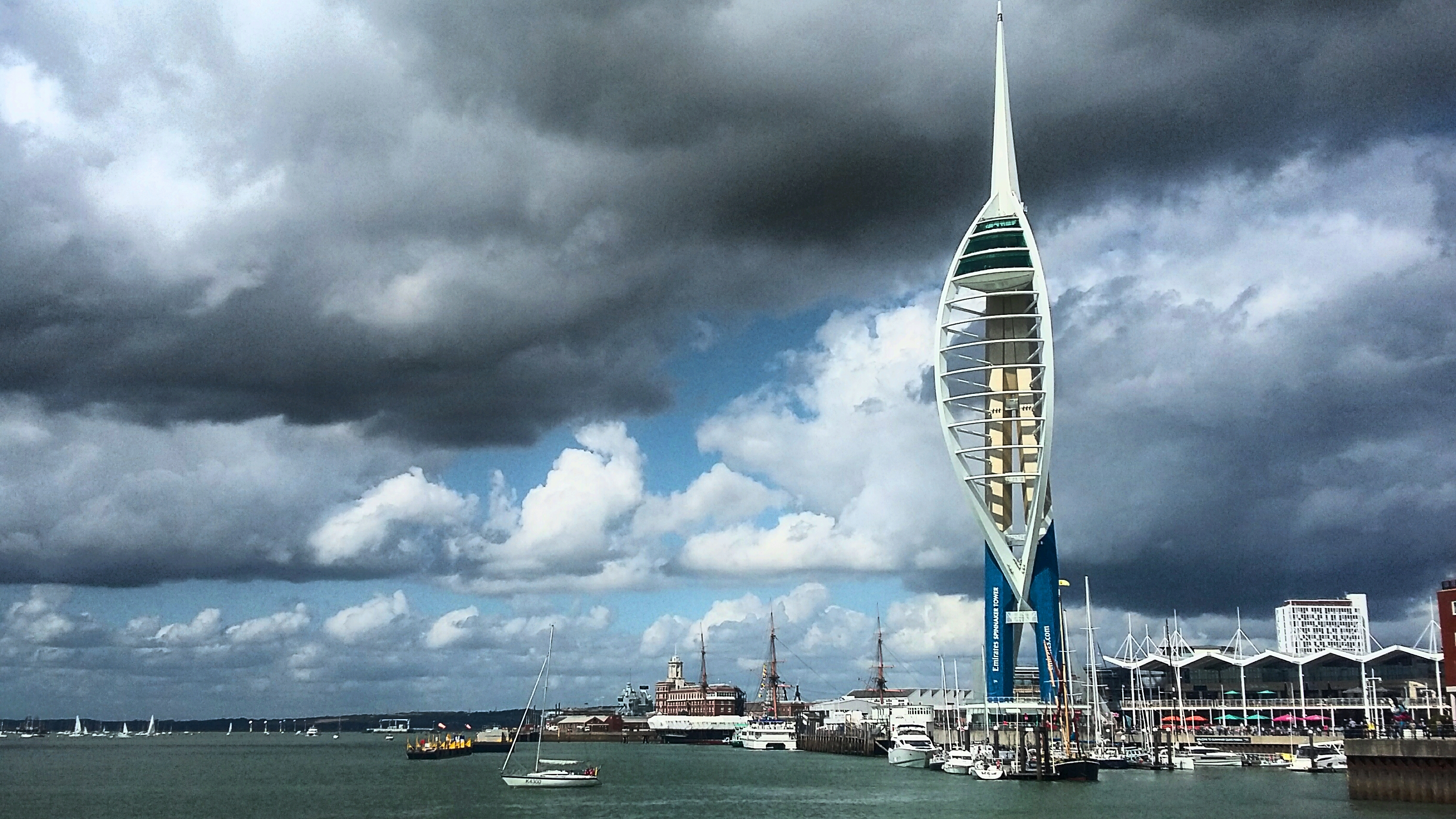
Portsmouth harbour with the Spinnaker Tower on the right. The masts of HMS Warrior and HMS Victory are visible in the background.

A tunnel crossing the mouth of the harbour between Gosport and Portsmouth was proposed in 1941, which would have allowed pedestrian traffic while doubling as a subterranean air raid shelter for residents on both sides. This proposal came during the Blitz, which saw Portsmouth and Gosport bombed heavily. The proposal, termed the "Kearney Tube" after the Australian engineer conducting the initial study, evolved into a proposal for rail link tunnel in 1942, but the project was never constructed.

In 1999, a study was undertaken by the Light Rail Transit Association in regard to a proposed tunnel crossing to alleviate traffic congestion in the area, particularly Gosport. Of three construction methods examined, an immersed tube was deemed to be the most effective, as it would not necessitate closing the harbour for over a year, but rather a series of shorter closures of around 24 hours for the addition of each segment of the tunnel. The tunnel would be approximately 1 km in length, though only around 670m of this would be underwater. The tunnel would have been part of a light rail network connecting Fareham, Gosport and Portsmouth. The South Hampshire Rapid Transit Order 2001 provided authorisation for the project, with construction intended for 2002, but financial problems delayed this. The Department for Transport ultimately declined to fund the initiative in 2005.

== See also ==
- Portsmouth Harbour railway station
