= Lymington =

Coastal town in Hampshire, England

Coordinates: 50.75°N 1.55°W

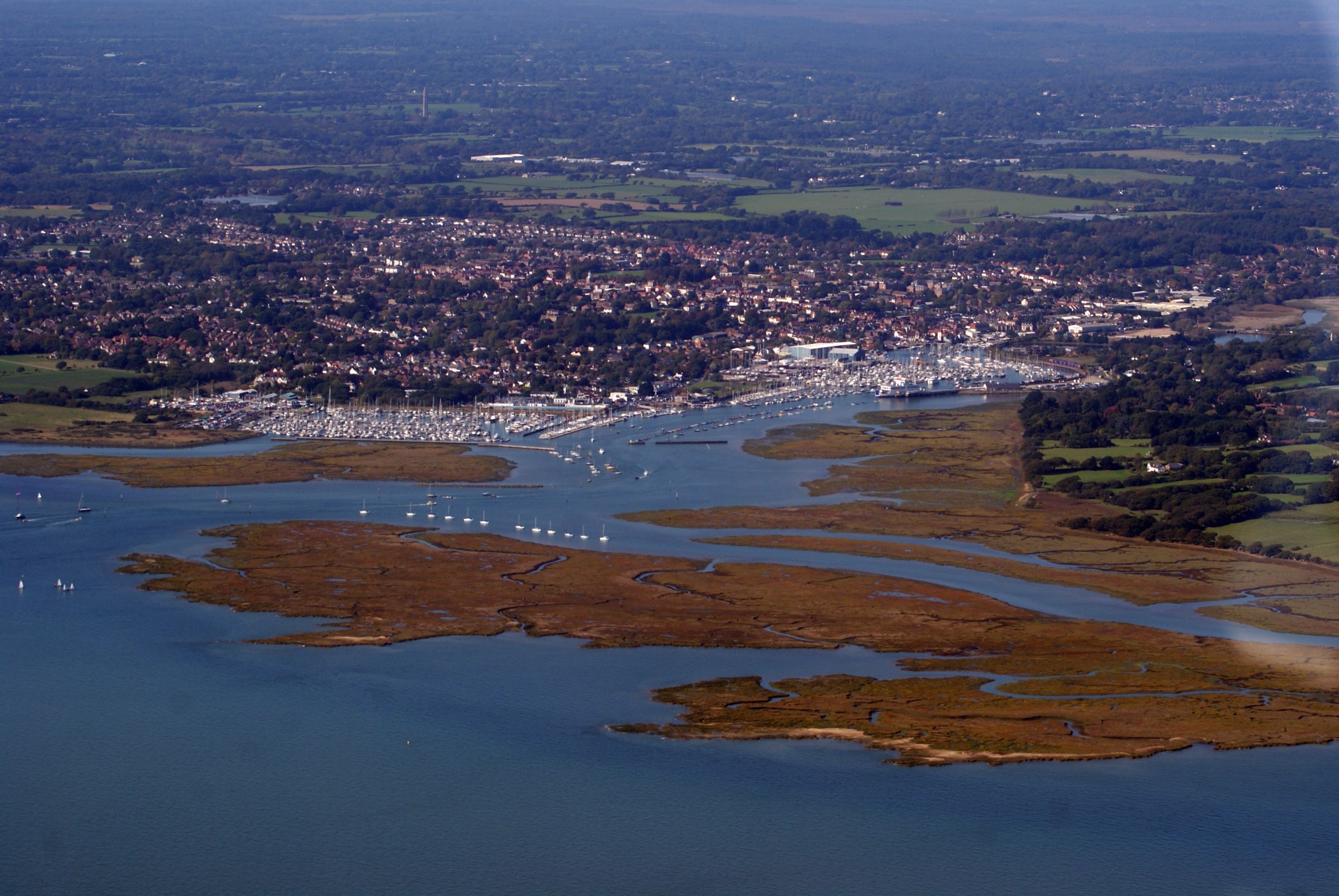
- From the air: yachts in the yacht basin can be seen on the left and the two other marinas; the New Forest fills most of the background.

- Location within Hampshire
- Area: 5.477 km^{2} (2.115 sq mi)
- Population: 14,858 (2021 census)
  - Density: 2,713/km^{2} (7,030/sq mi)
- OS grid reference: SZ3295
- Civil parish: Lymington and Pennington
- District: New Forest
- Shire county: Hampshire
- Region: South East
- Country: England
- Sovereign state: United Kingdom
- Post town: LYMINGTON
- Postcode district: SO41
- Dialling code: 01590
- Police: Hampshire and Isle of Wight
- Fire: Hampshire and Isle of Wight
- Ambulance: South Central
- UK Parliament: New Forest West

Lymington /ˈlɪmɪŋtən/ is a port town on the west bank of the Lymington River on the Solent, in the New Forest district of Hampshire, England.

The town faces Yarmouth, Isle of Wight, to which there is a car ferry service operated by Wightlink. It is within the civil parish of Lymington and Pennington. The town has a large tourist industry, based on proximity to the New Forest and its harbour. It is a major yachting centre with three marinas. In 2021 it had a population of 14,858.

== History ==
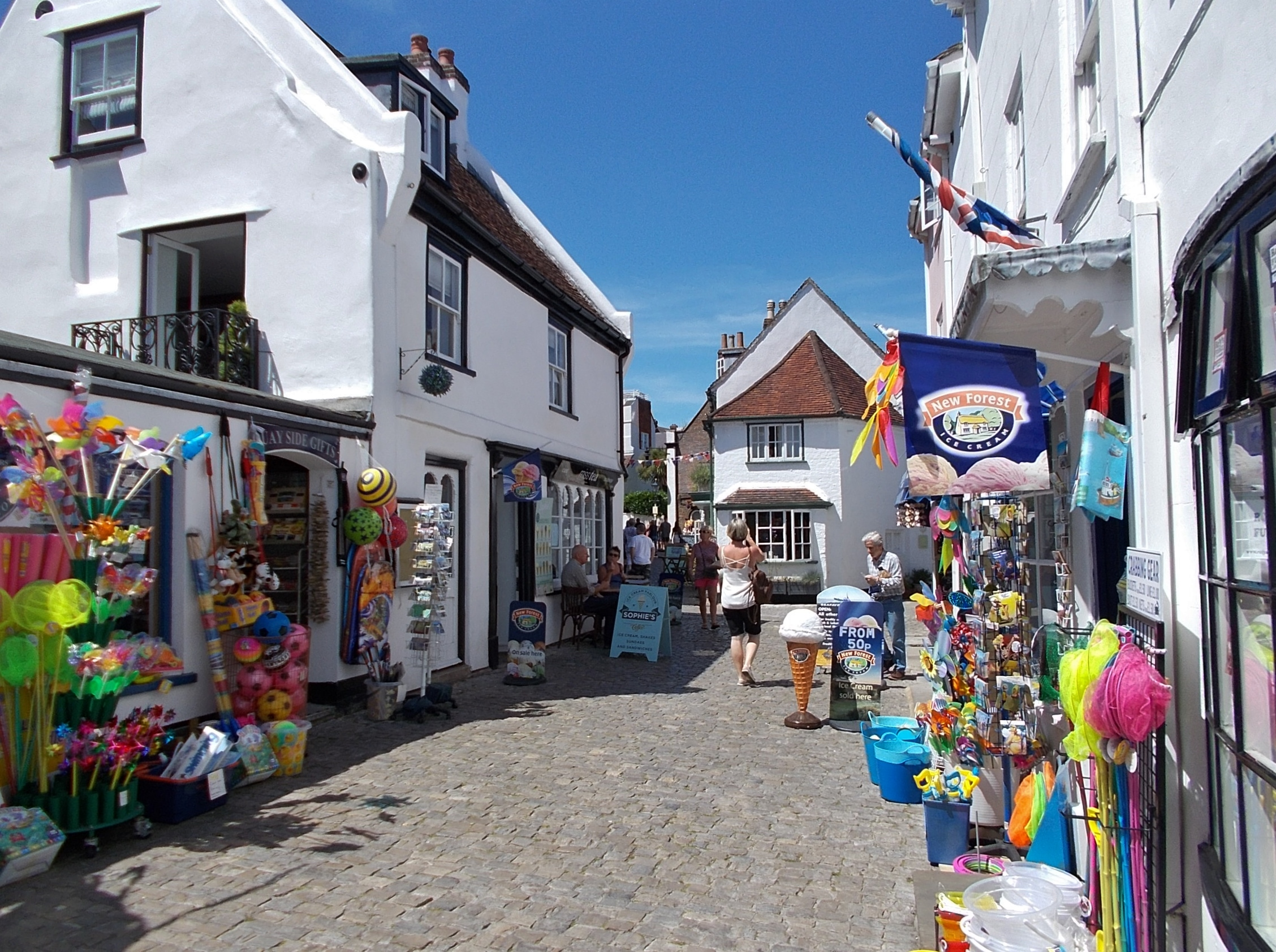
Cobbled streets in Lymington town centre

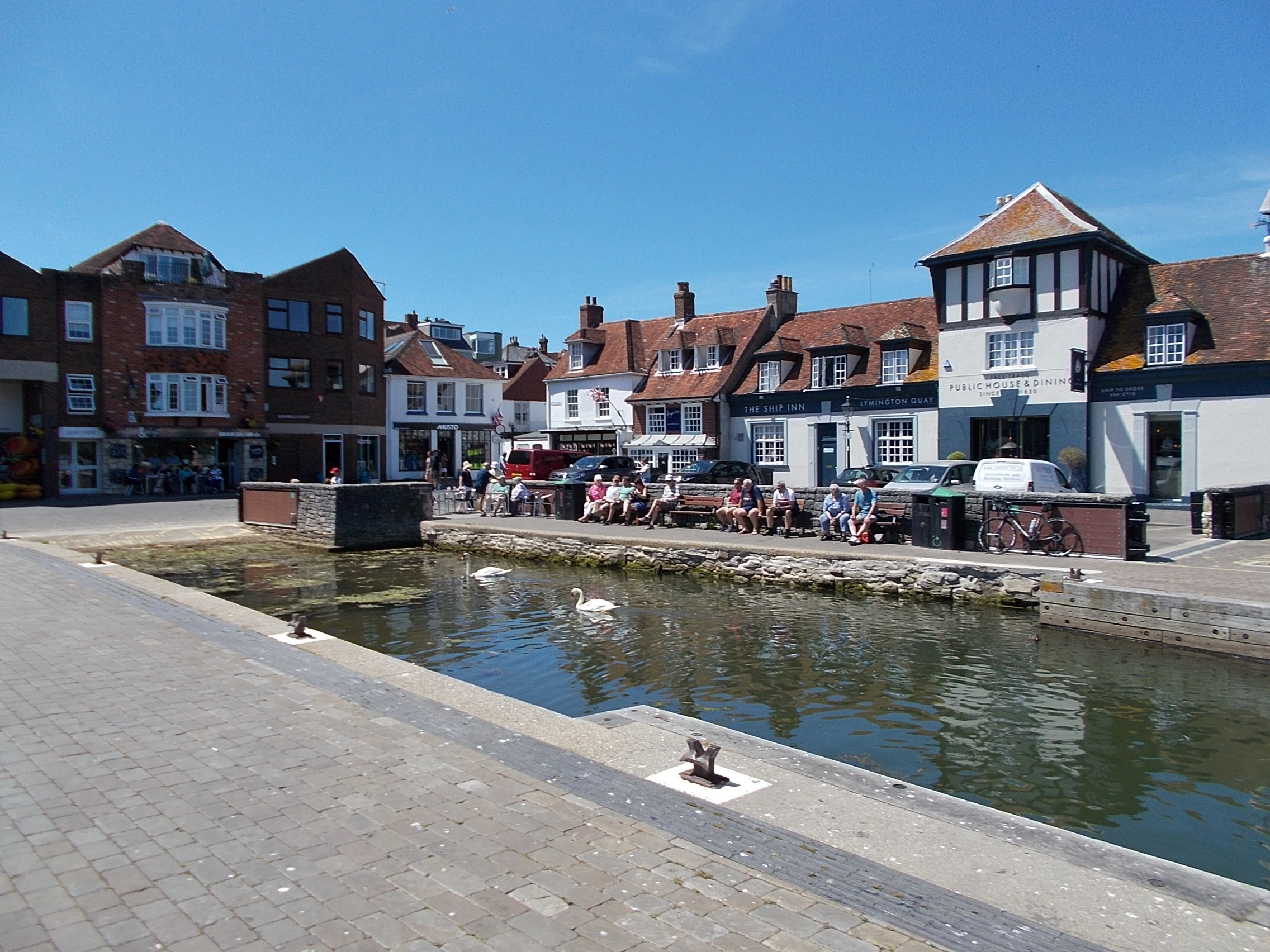
The town quay

The earliest settlement in the Lymington area was around the Iron Age hill fort known today as Buckland Rings. The hill and ditches of the fort survive, and archaeological excavation of part of the walls was carried out in 1935. The fort has been dated to around the 6th century BC. There is another supposed Iron Age site at nearby Ampress Hole. However, evidence of later settlement there (as opposed to occupation) is sparse before Domesday (1086).

Lymington itself began as an Anglo-Saxon village. The Jutes arrived in the area from the Isle of Wight in the 6th century and founded a settlement called Limentun. The Old English word tun means a farm or hamlet whilst limen is derived from the Ancient British word *lemanos meaning an elm tree.

The town is recorded in Domesday as Lentune. About 1200, the lord of the manor, William de Redvers created the borough of New Lymington around the present quay and High Street, while Old Lymington comprised the rest of the parish. He gave the town its first charter and the right to hold a market. The town became a parliamentary borough in 1585, returning two MPs until 1832, when its electoral base was expanded. Its representation was reduced to one member under the Reform Act 1867, and it was subsumed into the New Forest Division under the Redistribution of Seats Act 1885.

Lymington was famous for salt-making from the Middle Ages up to the 19th century. There was an almost continuous belt of salt workings along the coast toward Hurst Spit.

In the 18th and early 19th centuries, Lymington possessed a military depot that included a number of foreign troops – mostly artillery but also several militia regiments. At the time of the Napoleonic Wars, the King's German Artillery was based near Portchester Castle and sent sick soldiers to Lymington or Eling Hospital. As well as Germans and Dutch, there were French émigrés and French regiments. They were raised to take part in the ill-fated Quiberon Invasion of France, from which few returned (contrast the Battle of Quiberon Bay, or Bataille des Cardinaux, a 1759 victory).

From the early 19th century, Lymington had a thriving shipbuilding industry, particularly associated with Thomas Inman, builder of the schooner Alarm, which famously raced the American yacht America in the 1851 America's Cup. Much of the town centre is Victorian and Georgian, with narrow cobbled streets in the area of the quay. In 1859 the Roman Catholic church of Our Lady of Mercy and Saint Joseph was built to a design by Joseph Hansom.

Lymington particularly promotes stories about its smuggling. There are unproven stories of smugglers' tunnels running from the old inns and under the High Street to the town quay.

Lymington was among the boroughs reformed by the Municipal Corporations Act 1835. In 1932 it was extended to include Milton (previously an urban district), the parishes of Milford on Sea and Pennington, and parts of Lymington Rural District, so extending it along the coast to the edge of Christchurch.

The borough of Lymington was abolished on 1 April 1974 under the terms of the Local Government Act 1972, becoming an unparished area in the district of New Forest, with charter trustees. The area was subsequently divided into the four parishes of New Milton, Lymington and Pennington, Milford-on-Sea and Hordle on 1 April 1979. A new library was added in 2002.

== Lymington today ==
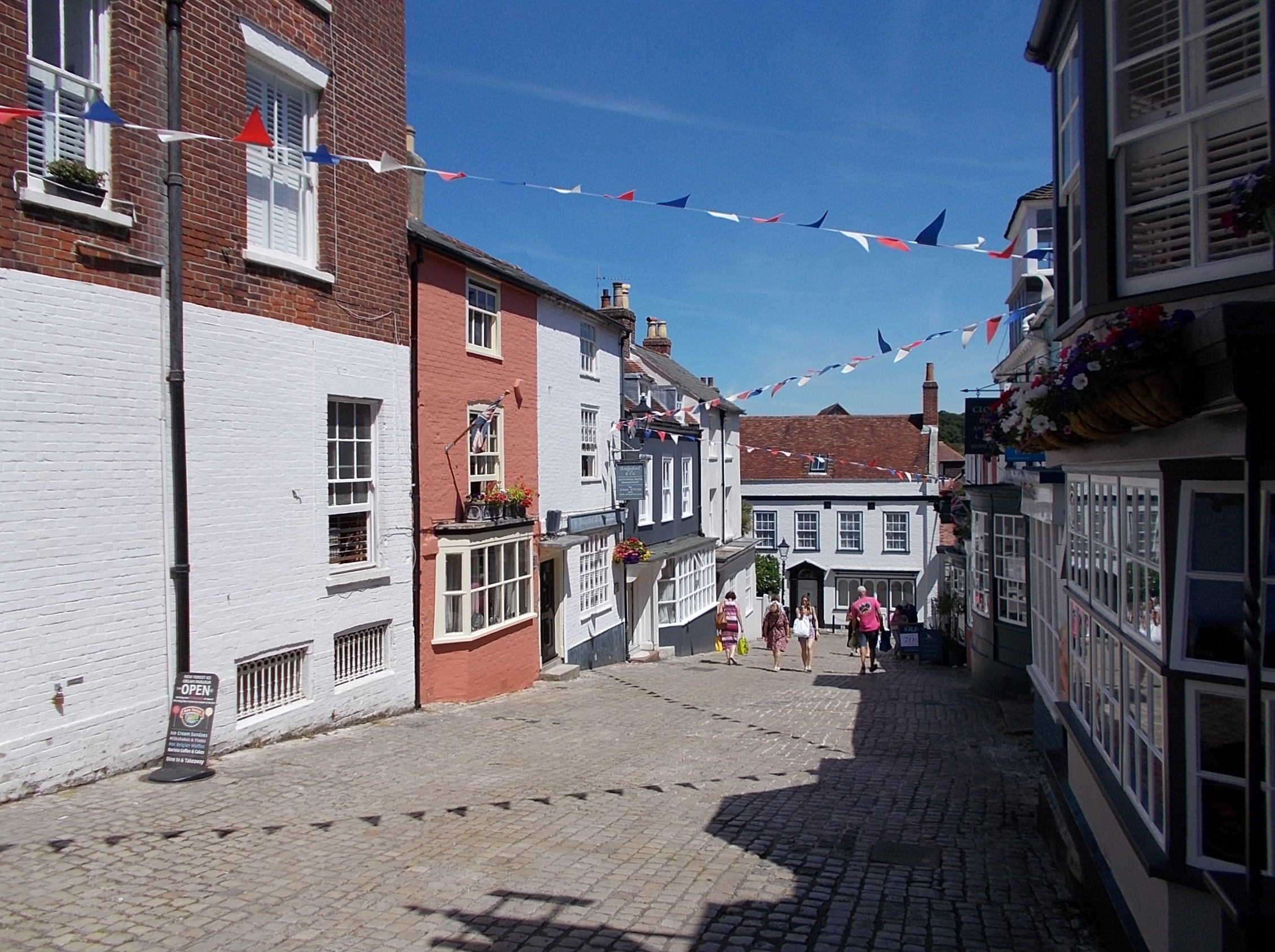
Looking down Quay Hill

Due to changes in planning legislation, many older areas of the town have been redeveloped. Houses have been demolished and replaced with apartment blocks and retirement homes. In a Channel 5 programme, Lymington received the accolade of "best town on the coast" in the UK for living (ahead of Sandbanks), for scenery, transport links and low crime levels.

Lymington New Forest Hospital opened in 2007, replacing the earlier Lymington Hospital. This has a minor injuries unit but no accident and emergency facility. The nearest are at Southampton General Hospital, 16 miles (26 km) away, and the Royal Bournemouth Hospital, 14.5 miles (23.3 km) away.

The main Anglican parish church is St Thomas's in the High Street. Lymington Town Hall, in Avenue Road, was opened in 1966.

The Mayor for Lymington and Pennington Town Council is current Councillor Colm McCarthy, and the Deputy Mayor is Councillor Iestyn Lewis.

In February 2026 Lymington and Pennington Town Council announced that it would enter the new Town of Culture contest for 2028.

=== Neighbourhoods ===
The northern neighbourhoods of the town are Buckland and Lower Buckland, the latter adjoining the Lymington River. However, to avoid confusion with Buckland, Portsmouth, also in Hampshire, many people refer to themselves and their businesses here solely as Lymington. The poet Caroline Anne Bowles (1786–1854) was born at Buckland Manor and died at Buckland Cottage.

Pennington is a village near Lymington, but is separated from the town by several schools with playing fields. Upper Pennington is a northern residential offshoot of Pennington, more rural in character, almost entirely surrounded by heath and farmland.

Lymington yacht basin and mudflats make up the former docks area known as Waterford.

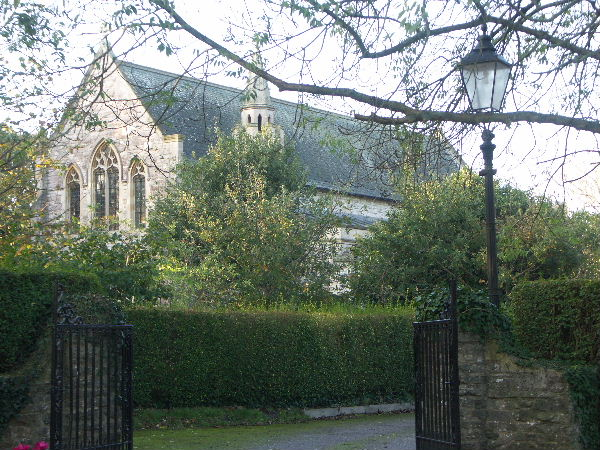
All Saints Church

Lower Pennington and Woodside lie adjacent to Woodside Park, a 20-hectare (49-acre) public park bequeathed to the people of Lymington in 1925 by Colonel Henry Douglas Rooke. The park includes formal gardens, a playground, a cricket ground and a sports field. The neighbourhood consists of a small southern triangle of residential and rural lanes, which include a manor house, church community hall, and All Saints' Church, Lymington. The church was built in 1909 by W. H. Romaine-Walker, architect of Danesfield House, Moreton Hall, Warwickshire, and the Tate Gallery extension, and a student of the High Victorian architect George Edmund Street.

Normandy is a coastal hamlet by a very small dock, salterns and estuary. It includes the buildings Normandy Garth, Little Normandy and Normandy Farm. The last backs onto De La Warr House, an early 19th-century listed building.

== Shopping ==
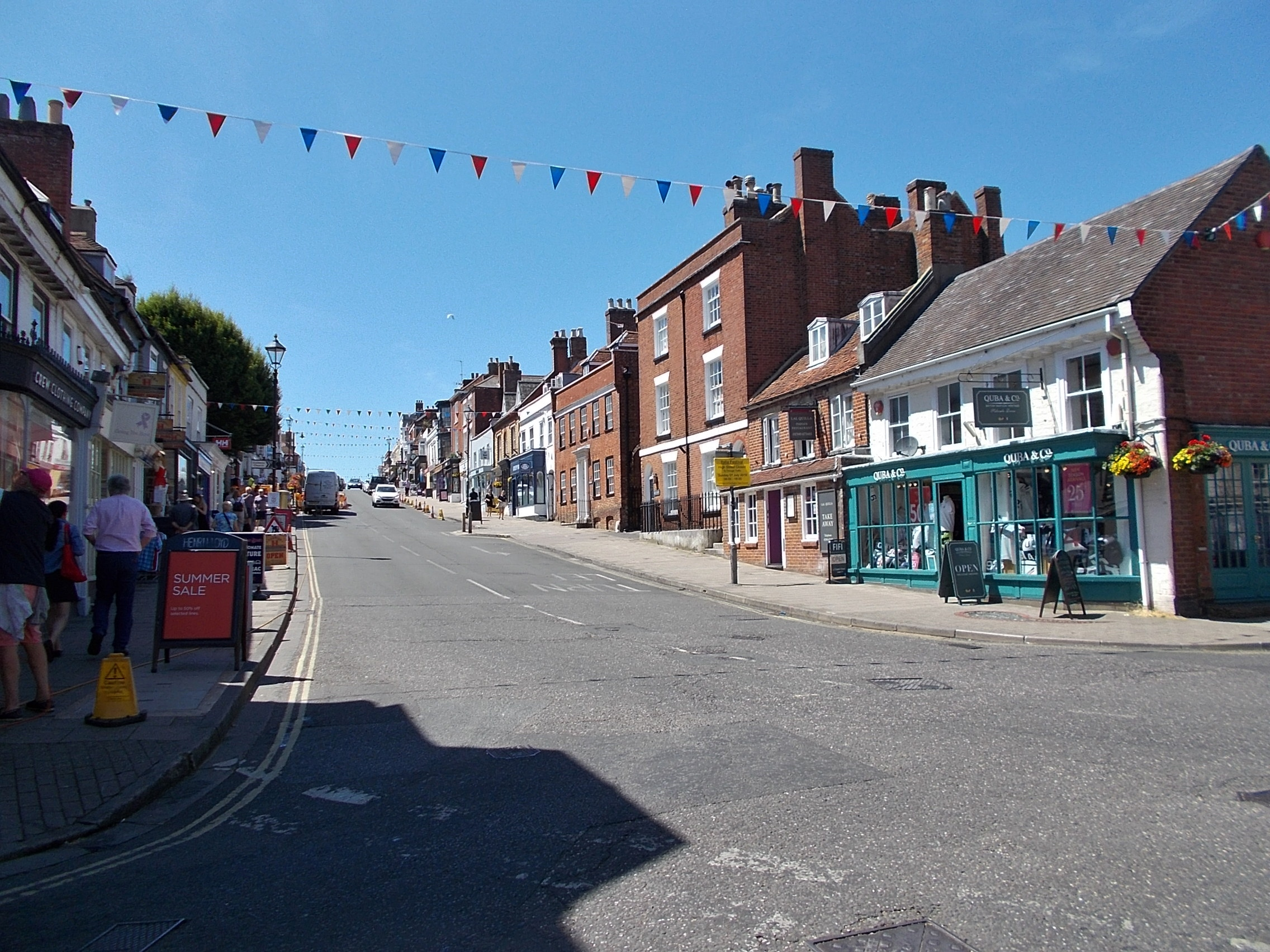
High Street

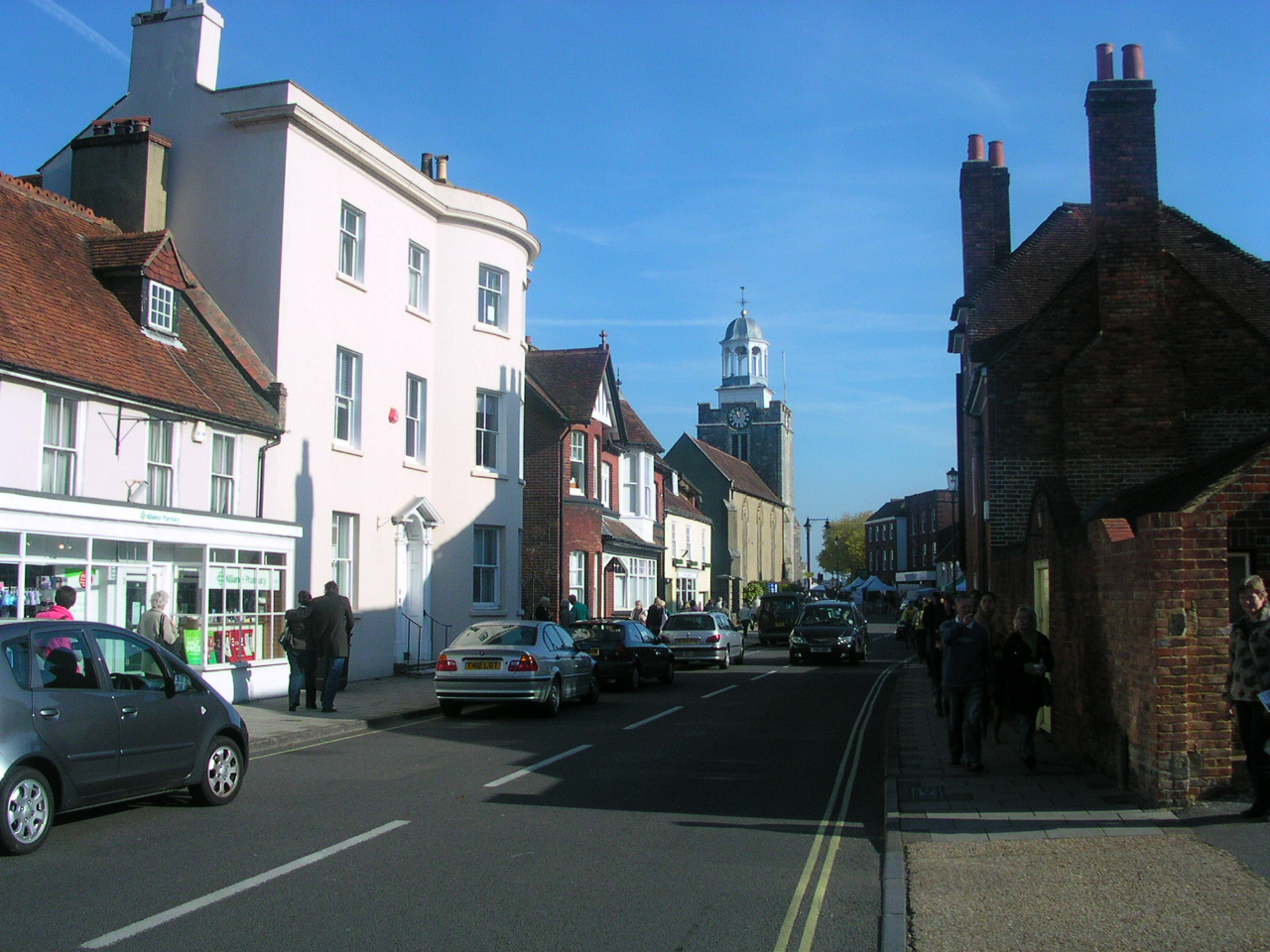
St Thomas Street and St Thomas's Church

The high street has seen rapid change over the last few years, with an increasing presence of chain stores and coffee-shop franchises. There is a local market, one of the New Forest producers' markets, held at the Masonic hall once a month in the game season. There are several marine outfitters in the cobbled street leading down to the quay.

Lymington has a wide range of shops and a large street market in the High Street, as well as three supermarkets: Waitrose, a small Tesco in the High Street, and a Marks and Spencer Food Hall.

=== Controversies ===
Several local campaigns have resulted in the rejection of proposals by businesses to open new branches on the high street, in an effort to preserve the town's character and status. In 2010, this led the media to dub Lymington "Britain's Snootiest Town".

In 2006, hundreds of residents signed a petition to prevent a new branch of the Argos retail outlet, fearing it would "lower the tone" of the area and attract a "certain calibre of customer". After the closure of Woolworths' high street stores in 2009, Argos applied to move into the empty premises and was rejected for a second time.

Retail chain 99p Stores, which had moved into the old Woolworths premises, were told to remove their shopfront signage, which appeared on all 103 of their stores across the country, for being "inappropriate and extremely gaudy".

A similar campaign in 2010 sought to prevent the pub chain J D Wetherspoon from opening a pub in the town. However, a second proposal by Wetherspoons in 2012 was successful and a pub named The Six Bells opened in 2013.

== Climate ==
Lymington, like the rest of the South of England, has a maritime climate of warm summers and mild winters. The nearest official Met office weather station for which online records are available is Everton, about 2 miles (3.2 km) to the west of the town centre. Thanks to its coastal position, sunshine levels are high relative to the rest of Britain, and severe frost unusual. The lowest recorded temperature in 43 years of records was −11.1 °C (12.0 °F) in January 1963. The highest locally recorded temperature was 33.5 °C (92.3 °F) in June 1976.

Climate data for Everton 16m asl, 1971–2000, extremes 1960–2003 (Weather station 2 miles (3 km) to the West of Lymington)
Month	Jan	Feb	Mar	Apr	May	Jun	Jul	Aug	Sep	Oct	Nov	Dec	Year
Record high °C (°F)	13.5 (56.3)	14.5 (58.1)	19.1 (66.4)	23.3 (73.9)	26.6 (79.9)	33.5 (92.3)	32.6 (90.7)	32.9 (91.2)	26.3 (79.3)	23.3 (73.9)	17.5 (63.5)	15.3 (59.5)	33.5 (92.3)
Mean daily maximum °C (°F)	7.9 (46.2)	7.9 (46.2)	10.1 (50.2)	12.4 (54.3)	15.9 (60.6)	18.4 (65.1)	20.8 (69.4)	20.8 (69.4)	18.3 (64.9)	14.9 (58.8)	11.1 (52.0)	9.0 (48.2)	14.0 (57.2)
Mean daily minimum °C (°F)	2.6 (36.7)	2.3 (36.1)	3.6 (38.5)	4.7 (40.5)	7.7 (45.9)	10.4 (50.7)	12.5 (54.5)	12.6 (54.7)	10.7 (51.3)	8.2 (46.8)	5.0 (41.0)	3.6 (38.5)	7.0 (44.6)
Record low °C (°F)	−11.1 (12.0)	−8.7 (16.3)	−8.3 (17.1)	−4.5 (23.9)	−2.8 (27.0)	1.7 (35.1)	4.4 (39.9)	4.4 (39.9)	1.7 (35.1)	−2.3 (27.9)	−6.5 (20.3)	−8.9 (16.0)	−11.1 (12.0)
Average precipitation mm (inches)	81.0 (3.19)	58.7 (2.31)	60.3 (2.37)	48.4 (1.91)	45.9 (1.81)	51.9 (2.04)	37.7 (1.48)	49.5 (1.95)	67.1 (2.64)	88.0 (3.46)	84.2 (3.31)	91.2 (3.59)	763.7 (30.07)
Mean monthly sunshine hours	61.7	81.1	121.8	181.5	223.2	212.4	231.6	223.2	160.2	120.0	80.7	53.3	1,750.7
Source 1: Met Office date=November 2011
Source 2: Royal Dutch Meteorological Institute/KNMI date=November 2011

== Sports and leisure ==
The town's leisure amenities include several parks, a nine-hole golf course, a rowing club, a community centre, a library, St Barbe Museum and Art Gallery, two swimming pools (one the Lymington Open Air Sea Water Baths built in 1833), a sports centre, a small cinema/theatre, a Skatepark (for skateboards), several tennis courts, and some youth football pitches. There is also a pétanque terrain near St Thomas's church. Lymington Cricket Club was established in 1807 and plays in the Southern Premier and Hampshire Cricket leagues.

The proximity of the New Forest makes Lymington a popular base for walking, cycling and riding.

=== Sailing ===
Royal Lymington Yacht Club
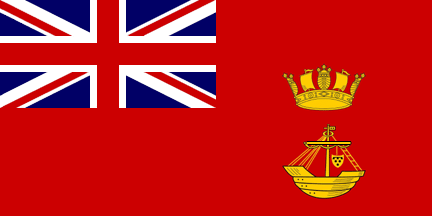
- Ensign
- Short name: RLYC
- Founded: 1922; 104 years ago
- Location: Lymington, Hampshire, England
- Website: https://rlymyc.org.uk/About_Us/Join_Us

Lymington is famous for its sailing history, and in recent years has been home to the world-famous regattas such as the Royal Lymington Cup, Etchells Worlds, Macnamara's Bowl, and Source Regatta. The strong tides make it a challenging race track, and together with the shallow depth of the river has resulted in Lymington losing several regattas to the Central Solent, principally run from Cowes. Nevertheless, Thursday Evening Racing takes place with up to 100 boats registered to race every Thursday night during the summer, hosted by the Royal Lymington Yacht Club. Started in the 1990s, this has become increasingly popular.

There are two active sailing clubs in the town. The Royal Lymington Yacht Club, founded in the 1920s as Lymington River Sailing Club, has over 3,000 members and runs major keelboat and dinghy events. The Lymington Town Sailing Club, founded in 1946, hosts a popular Lymington Winter Series known as the Solent Circuit.

=== Football ===
Lymington has a non-League football club, Lymington Town F.C., which plays at the sports ground. The children's football club, Lymington Sprites, is based in nearby Pennington.

=== Cricket ===
Lymington Cricket Club is an amateur cricket club that plays at the Sports Ground. The Third and Fourth XI play their home matches at Woodside Park. The club's first team compete in the Southern Premier Cricket League, which is the highest level of club cricket in Hampshire.

=== Rugby union ===
Lymington has a rugby union club, Lymington Mariners RFC, whose two teams play at Woodside Park. It meets every Thursday evening for practice and most Saturday afternoons for tournament games in the Hampshire region, and friendlies around the South of England.

== Media ==
Local news and television programmes are provided by BBC South and ITV Meridian. Television signals are received from the Rowridge TV transmitter.

Local radio stations are BBC Radio Solent on 96.1 FM, Heart South on 96.7 FM, Capital South on 103.2 FM, Easy Radio South Coast on 107.8 FM, Nation Radio South Coast on 106.0 FM and New Forest Hospital Radio, that broadcast local programming to patients from the New Forest Hospital in the town.

The Lymington Times and New Milton Advertiser is the town's local newspaper.

== Transport ==
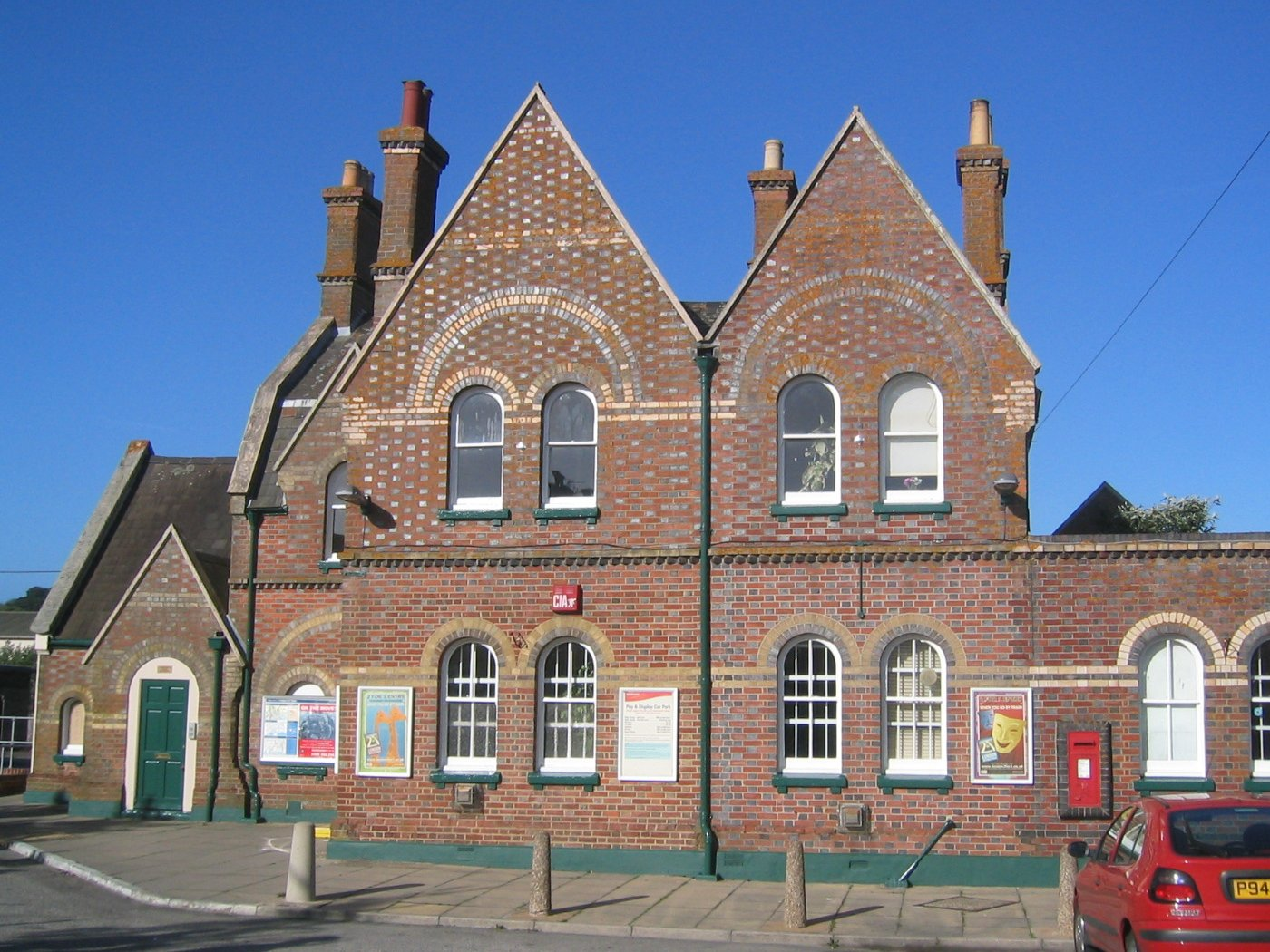
Lymington Town railway station

=== Buses ===
Lymington bus depot is owned by Go South Coast. Numerous local services operate, as do routes to Bournemouth and Southampton. In the summer, the New Forest Tour serves the town with open-top buses.

=== Rail ===
Lymington's two railway stations – Lymington Pier (the terminus), on the east side of the river near the ferry terminal, and Lymington Town – are connected to the national rail network by a branch line to Brockenhurst. Services twice an hour are operated by South Western Railway.

=== Roads ===
The A337 road links Lymington to Lyndhurst and the M27 motorway to the north, and to New Milton and the South East Dorset conurbation to the west.

=== Ferries ===
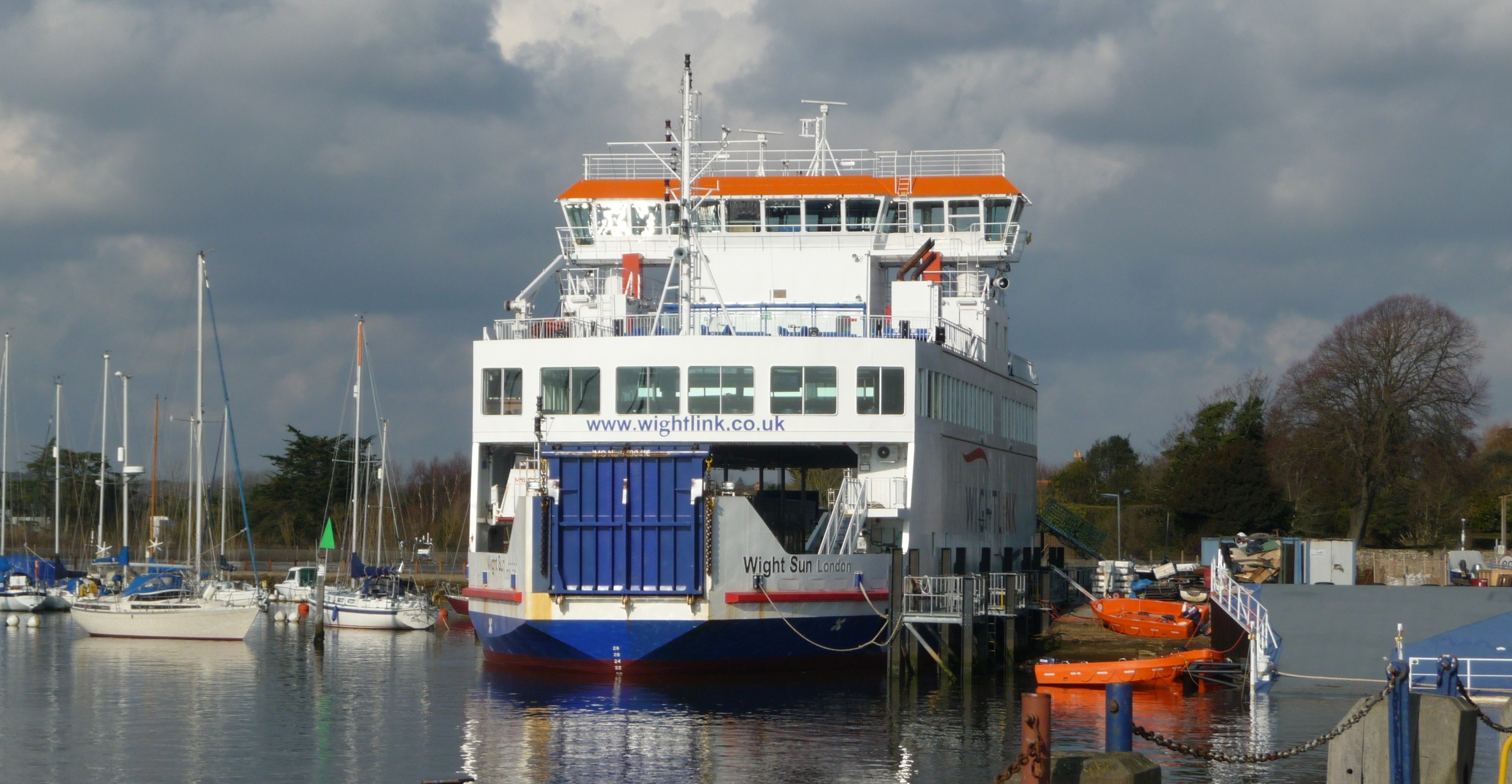
Wightlink's Wight Sun ferry berthed at Lymington

Ferries have run between Lymington and Yarmouth, Isle of Wight, since the 19th century. Since 1990 they have been operated by Wightlink, succeeding the nationalised Sealink on the route. The current fleet comprises three car ferries, which entered service in 2009: Wight Light, Wight Sky and Wight Sun. The service runs about once an hour from a dock south-east of the old town on the far side of the Lymington River.

== In fiction and on screen ==
Lymington features in The Children of the New Forest by Captain Marryat, in the historical novels of the local writer Warwick Collins (The Rationalist and The Marriage of Souls), and in The Forest by Edward Rutherfurd.

In Tom Clancy's Patriot Games, a Wightlink ferry heading from the Lymington ferry terminal is intercepted and a prisoner extracted in heavy seas. Several men on board the ferry are murdered.

The 1980 Christmas special of the ITV children's show Worzel Gummidge was filmed in the town during the summer of that year. During filming a sudden wind blew the titanium dioxide that was being used as a replica of snow into homes, shops and businesses, causing damage and a large compensation bill for the producers, Southern Television.

Lymington was occasionally featured in the 1980s BBC series Howards' Way.

The third season of the ITV crime drama series Unforgotten was partially filmed in Lymington, with the town standing in for the fictional Middenham.

== Notable people ==
- Thomas Blakiston (1832–1891) was an explorer and naturalist born in Lymington.

== Twin towns ==
Lymington is twinned with:

- Vitré (France)
- Mosbach (Germany)
- Almansa (Spain)

An active programme of exchange visits is coordinated by the local Twinning Association.

== See also ==
- Lymington power station
