= RAF Medmenham =

Former RAF base in Buckinghamshire, England

RAF Medmenham
- Near Medmenham, Buckinghamshire in England
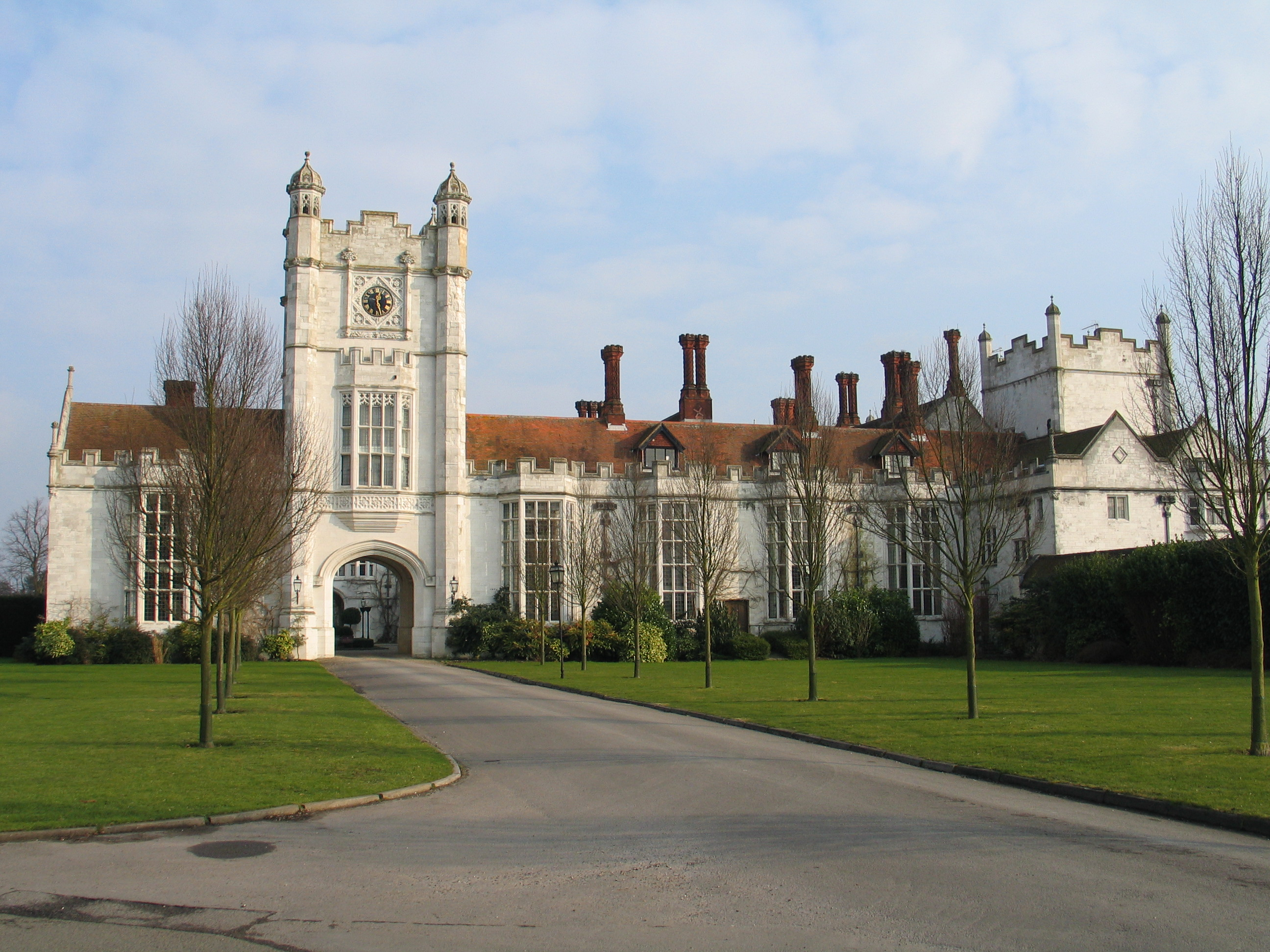
- Danesfield House, the home of RAF Medmenham

Site information
- Type: Royal Air Force station
- Owner: Ministry of Defence
- Operator: Royal Air Force
- Controlled by: Allied Central Interpretation Unit

Location
- Shown within Buckinghamshire RAF Medmenham (the United Kingdom)
- Coordinates: 51°33′10″N 0°49′25″W

Site history
- Built: 1941
- In use: 1941-1977
- Battles/wars: European theatre of World War II; Cold War

Garrison information
- Past commanders: Peter Stewart, Francis Cator, Douglas Kendall

RAF Medmenham is a former Royal Air Force station based at Danesfield House near Medmenham, in Buckinghamshire, England. Activities there specialised in photographic intelligence, and it was once the home of the RAF Intelligence Branch. During the Second World War, RAF Medmenham was the main interpretation centre for photographic reconnaissance operations in the European and Mediterranean theatres.

== Second World War ==
In April 1941, an RAF photographic interpretation unit (PIU) moved to Danesfield House, Medmenham, as its previous location at Wembley was short of space, and was renamed the Central Interpretation Unit (CIU). Later that year the Bomber Command Damage Assessment Section was absorbed, and amalgamation was completed when the Night Photographic Interpretation Section of No 3 Photographic Reconnaissance Unit, RAF Oakington, was integrated with CIU in February 1942 and the base was assigned the motto Serve and Support.

During 1942 and 1943, the CIU gradually expanded and was involved in the planning stages of practically every operation of the war, and in every aspect of intelligence. In 1945, daily intake of material averaged 25,000 negatives and 60,000 prints. By VE-day, the print library, which documented and stored worldwide cover, held 5,000,000 prints from which 40,000 reports had been produced.

American personnel had for some time formed an increasing part of the CIU and on 1 May 1944 this was finally recognised by changing the title of the unit to the Allied Central Interpretation Unit (ACIU). There were then over 1,700 personnel on the unit's strength. The title of the unit reverted to Central Interpretation Unit when the Americans returned home in August 1945.

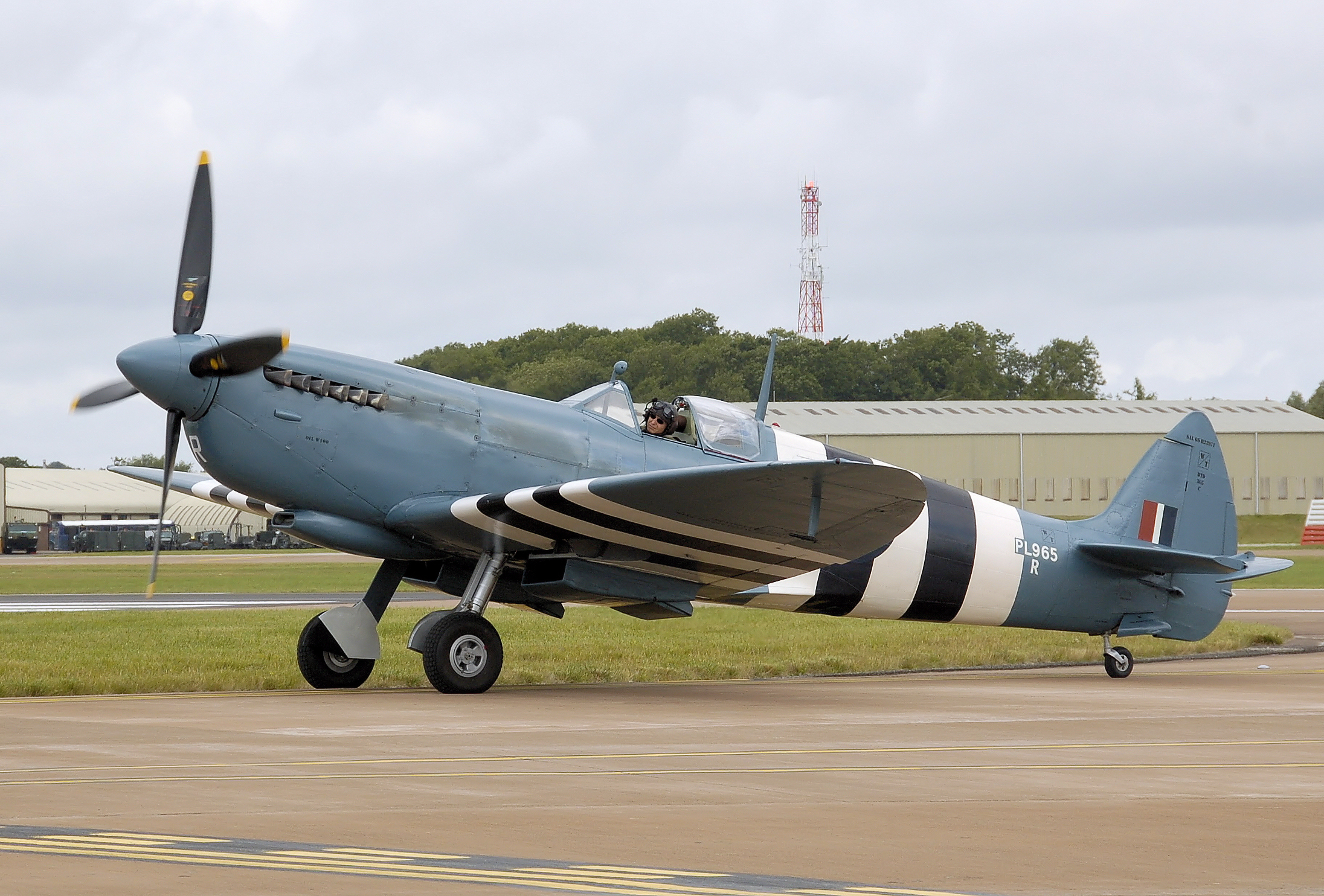
Photographic reconnaissance Spitfire PR Mk XI wearing 1944 invasion stripes.

Early in 1945, a number of photographic interpreters (PIs) were sent to join the British Bombing Research Mission in Paris to explore the degree of damage and production interruption caused by Allied bombing in the Resistance areas of the Massif Central and in the ports. They were also tasked with checking PI reports which were eventually related to assessment reports of attacks on German industry. Several PIs were also seconded to the Pentagon in Washington, D.C., to join a detachment of RAF and British Army officers.

Supermarine Spitfires, without any guns but with a maximum speed of 396 mph at 30,000 feet, were used for photo-reconnaissance missions. The aircraft were fitted with five cameras which were heated to ensure good results (while the cockpit was not). Another key aircraft was the Mosquito which had a cruising speed of 255 mph, maximum of 362 mph and a maximum altitude of 35,000 ft. Thirty-six million prints were made during the war, of which some 10 million, many in 3-D, still survive and are today kept in Edinburgh. A large number of photographic interpreters were recruited from the Hollywood Film Studios including Xavier Atencio. Dirk Bogarde was employed in the Army reconnaissance section as a visual inspector. Two renowned archaeologists also worked there as interpreters: Dorothy Garrod, the first woman to hold an Oxbridge Chair, and Glyn Daniel, who went on to gain popular acclaim as the host of the television game show Animal, Vegetable or Mineral?. Up to 150 women were also employed as PIs.

Of particular significance in the success of the work of Medmenham was the use of stereoscopic images, using a between plate overlap of exactly 60%. Having overcome the initial scepticism of Lord Cherwell to the possibility of the new rocket technology, major operations made possible by the work at Medmanham included, on 17 and 18 August 1943, an offensive against the V-2 rocket development plant at Peenemünde. Later offensives were also made against potential launch sites at Wizernes and 96 other launch sites in Northern France. It is claimed that Medmanham's greatest operational success was "Operation Crossbow" which, from 23 December 1943, destroyed the V-1 infrastructure in Northern France. One of the key PI's in the V-weapon detection period was Constance Babington Smith. Babington Smith was also responsible for the Allies' confirmation of the existence of the German Me 163 Komet rocket plane as well as evidence of the test flights of the Messerschmitt Me 262 jet fighter, the scorched grass caused by the rocket and jet engines of both aircraft being visible in aerial photographs taken over Rechlin – "The German equivalent of Farnborough".

== Post-Second World War ==
With the cessation of hostilities in Europe in May 1945 some sections closed almost immediately, whilst others worked on tasks for the Control Commission in Germany. The several Army sections of CIU were incorporated in September 1946 to become the Army Photographic Interpretation Centre (UK) (APIC (UK)).

The CIU was placed under the control of the newly established Central Photographic Establishment of RAF Coastal Command which had replaced the disbanded No. 106 Group RAF and the Joint Photographic Reconnaissance Committee (JPRC). In August 1947, the unit's name was changed yet again, this time to the Joint Air Photographic Intelligence Centre (UK) (JAPIC (UK)). In October 1947, APIC (UK) was renamed the Army Photographic Interpretation Unit (UK), (APIU (UK)) and, although it continued to operate within JAPIC (UK), had special responsibilities to the Director of Military Intelligence. The Officer Commanding APIU (UK) was also deputy commandant of JAPIC (UK).

In December 1953, the unit was given the title of the Joint Air Reconnaissance Intelligence Centre (United Kingdom), (JARIC (UK)). The personnel of APIU (UK) were absorbed into the establishment of the joint service unit and the Army has continued to provide a number of PIs and supporting staffs in the JARIC establishment. JARIC moved in 1957 from its base at RAF Nuneham Park, near Oxford, to RAF Brampton. In 2012 JARIC was renamed Defence Geospatial Intelligence Fusion Centre (DGIFC) and moved to the other side of Huntingdon to RAF Wyton in 2013.

The Joint School of Photographic Interpretation (JSPI) at RAF Chicksands – where PIs for all three British services are now trained has been named the 'Medmenham Training Wing' in honour of the unit's heritage with Medmenham.

In 1952, 591 Signals Unit moved to RAF Medmenham from RAF Wythall and stayed until 1955 when it moved to RAF Digby, its current location. It was during its stay at Medmenham that the unit's crest was conceived; a kingfisher watching over the river (Thames), representing the unit's watch over the integrity and security of RAF communications.

On 3 November 1958, RAF Signals Command (motto: Aetherem Vincere – "To conquer the upper air") was formed at Medmenham by raising No. 90 Group RAF to Command status under Air Vice Marshal Leslie Dalton-Morris. It was a relatively short-lived Command, lasting only until 1 January 1969, when it was absorbed by Strike Command and reduced to Group status. It had five Air Officers Commanding in Chief during its existence.

Since the early 2000s, the Joint Air Reconnaissance Intelligence Centre and Allied Central Interpretation Unit collections have been held by the National Collection of Aerial Photography.

== RAF Radio Introduction Branch ==
During the Second World War, an organisation known as the Post Design Services (PDS) was formed at the Telecommunications Research Establishment (TRE), Malvern, Worcestershire, to provide a direct link between the designers of electronic equipment in the laboratories and the service users in the field. The organisation was staffed by civilian scientists ("boffins") and serving officers and worked predominantly in the fields of airborne radar and ground-controlled interception (GCI).

In 1946, PDS was disbanded and a successor organisation, the Radio Introduction Branch (RIB), was formed at RAF Medmenham. In 1952, the RIB was renamed as Radio Introduction Unit (RIU) and became responsible for the introduction into service of all airborne and ground radio systems. The unit had a complement of ten officers dealing with airfield approach aids, airborne tail warning, Doppler navigation, weapon aiming and airborne interception for aircraft such as the Gloster Javelin, Bristol Brigand, Vickers Valetta, de Havilland Venom and Gloster Meteor. The unit moved to RAF Benson in 1977.

== See also ==
- Aerial reconnaissance
- Imagery intelligence
- National Collection of Aerial Photography
- Telecommunications Research Establishment
