= Lymington Town Hall =

Municipal building in Lymington, Hampshire, England

Coordinates: 50.7605°N 1.5464°W

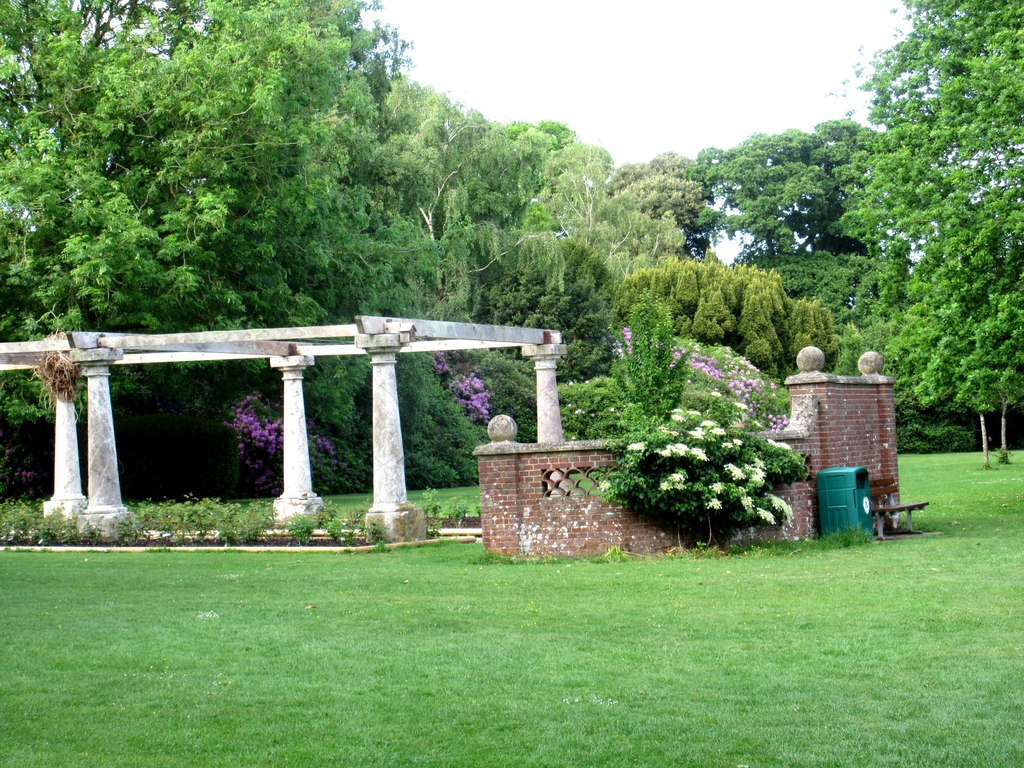
The pergola at Woodside Gardens which incorporates the columns from the second town hall

Lymington Town Hall is a municipal building in Avenue Road in Lymington, a town in Hampshire, in England. The building currently accommodates the offices of Lymington and Pennington Town Council as well as the headquarters of the New Forest National Park.

== History ==
The first recorded town hall in Lymington was erected on the south side of the High Street on a site donated to the town by a wealthy widow, Juliana Tevant, and was completed in 1463. This town hall became inadequate and a second town hall was commissioned on the initiative of John Mitchell, built on a site on the north side of the High Street at a cost of £143 and was completed in 1683. It was enclosed on the ground floor, so that markets could be held, with an assembly room on the first floor. The corporation later relocated to the Nags Head hotel, and the former town hall was used as a grammar school. The second town hall was demolished in 1782, but its columns survived and were incorporated into a pergola at Woodside Gardens.

After the second town hall also became inadequate, a third town hall was erected with funding from the local member of parliament, Paul Burrard, on a site in the middle of the High Street, further to the east of the previous building, and was completed in 1710. It was arcaded on the ground floor, so that markets could be held, with an assembly room on the first floor. King George III, accompanied by Bishop George Pretyman Tomline, visited the town hall and admired the view in the early 19th century, and Admiral Sir Harry Neale gave a speech about the Reform Bill there in 1831. Following the implementation of the Municipal Corporations Act 1835, the mayor, aldermen and burgesses of Lymington were replaced by an elected council which met in the town hall to discuss important local issues. The borough council was left without a dedicated building when the third town hall was demolished in 1858.

The borough council commissioned a fourth town hall on a site to the east of the previous building on the north side of the High Street. It was designed in the Edwardian Baroque style, built in red brick with stone dressings and was completed in 1913. The design involved a symmetrical main frontage of three bays facing onto the High Street. The central bay was fenestrated by three sash windows on the ground floor, and by a large Venetian window opening out onto a balcony on the first floor, all flanked by giant pilasters supporting an open pediment containing elaborate carvings in the tympanum. The fourth town hall was demolished to make way for the Early Court Shopping Centre in 1966.

The current and fifth town hall was commissioned in April 1962. The site the borough council selected on Avenue Road was open land to the west of the old Lymington Union Workhouse. The new building was designed in the modern style, built in brick and was officially opened by Queen Elizabeth II on 15 July 1966. The design involved a three-story office block on the left, a single-storey office block to the right, and, in the centre, a civic block containing the council chamber, which was blind on the main front, but with the borough coat of arms installed in the centre of the wall.

The building continued to serve as the offices of Lymington Urban District Council for another decade, but ceased to be the local seat of government when New Forest District Council was formed at Lyndhurst in 1974. However, the new council continued to use the town hall for the delivery of local services. Soon after, Lymington and Pennington Town Council was created, and it used part of the building as its offices. Since 2012, the building has also accommodated the headquarters of the New Forest National Park.
