= Buckland Rings =

Iron Age hillfort in Hampshire, England

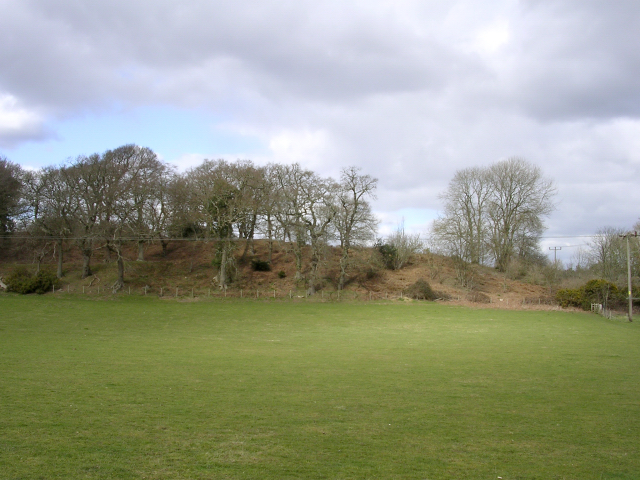
- Southern ramparts of Buckland Rings

- Location within Hampshire
- 50.77022°N 1.55525°W
- Type: Hillfort
- Periods: Iron Age
- Location: Lymington, Hampshire grid reference SZ314968

Site notes
- Height: 2.4 m (7 ft 10 in)
- Area: 2.8 ha (6.9 acres)
- Excavation dates: 1935
- Archaeologists: Christopher Hawkes
- Condition: Damaged on the east and west sides
- Owner: Hampshire County Council
- Public access: Yes

Buckland Rings is the site of an Iron Age hill fort in the town of Lymington, Hampshire. Today, the mounds and dykes around the outside which once constituted its defences are still clearly visible, although the outer bank lies under the road on the west side, and on the south-east it is nearly ploughed-out. Excavations of the inner and middle ramparts in 1935 revealed that they were of wall-and-fill construction, retained at the front by upright timber beams and walls of cut and laid turf. The entrance, which lies on the east side, was also excavated revealing a long entrance passage and the postholes for a pair of stout gateposts. The site was bought by Hampshire County Council in 1989 to ensure its preservation, and it is open to the public from the A337 road onto which part of it faces.

== Overview ==
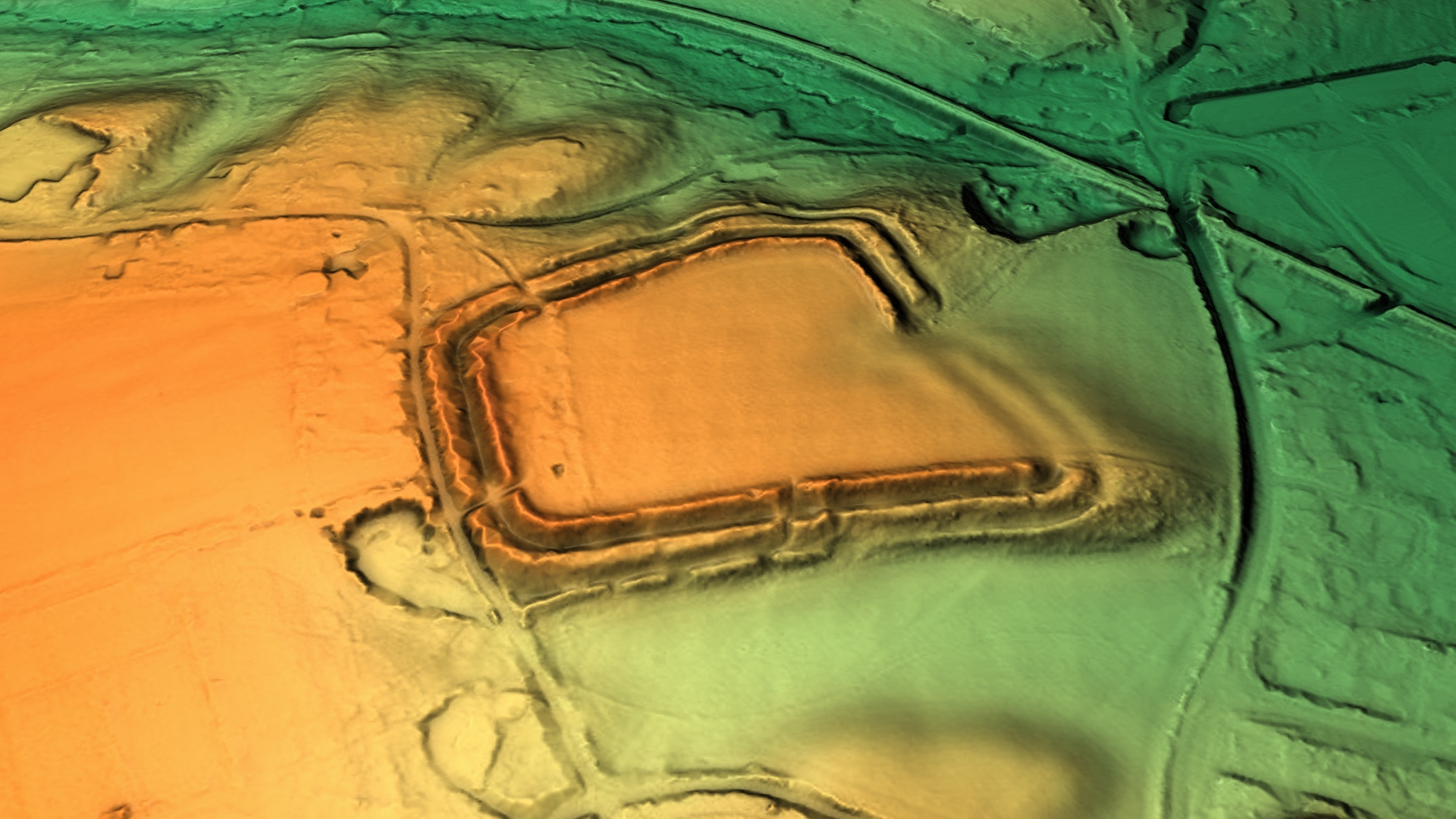
3D view of the digital terrain model

Buckland Rings is a triple-banked, rectangular encampment dating from the Iron Age. Although this type of enclosure is commonly referred to as a hillfort, Buckland Rings is in fact only 27 metres above sea-level. This type of site is rare in lowland areas and as such it is the best preserved and most important in the Hampshire/Dorset basin. It stands on a spur of gravel and encloses 2.8 hectares. The innermost bank stands 2.4 metres high whilst the middle one is lower but unusually wide. Buckland Rings has well-preserved triple banks and double ditches, although the outer bank lies under the road on the west side, and the east side which contained the entrance was partly ploughed up in the mid 18th century.

== Early reports ==
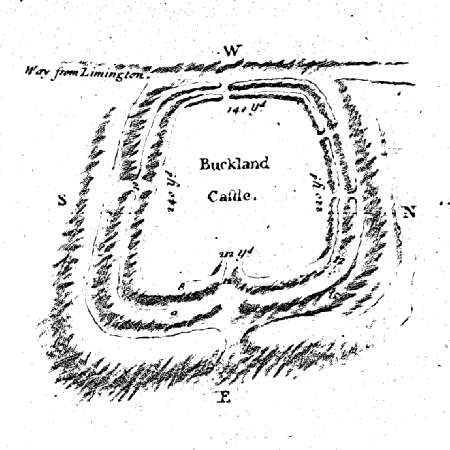
Buckland Rings depicted by Thomas Wright in 1744

The earliest report of Buckland Rings was by Thomas Wright who visited the site in the summer of 1743. He described Buckland Rings as "very strong, with double ditches, and triple Vallums, upon the Top of an Hill, three Ways guarded by a natural Ascent." Wright drew a plan of the fort, which is especially valuable as some of the eastern ramparts were flattened by a farmer around 1750. Wright also noticed the presence of a lower camp nearby (Ampress Camp) together with a farm called Ampress Farm, which he understood to be "Ambrose Farm", and he thought that it was "not improbable" that the site was "a principal station" belonging to the 5th-century Romano-British war-leader Ambrosius Aurelianus.

This thought was elaborated on by Richard Warner in 1793 who fancifully described how Ambrosius "unable to support the furious attacks of the invaders, was probably driven, ... till he reached the neighbourhood of Lymington." Warner describes how "an earthwork, a rude sample of British castrametation, may still be discerned at this place."

Others simply thought that Buckland Rings was a Roman camp, but in 1885 the newly formed Hampshire Field Club and Archaeological Society examined the site and resolved that the word "Roman" should be omitted from future Ordnance Survey maps.

== 1935 Excavations ==
To date the only excavation of the site was that conducted over a three-week period in 1935 under the supervision of Christopher Hawkes, following some preparatory work in 1934. Hawkes limited his excavations to areas around the entrance, and especially to the inner and middle ramparts and ditches on the east side where the ramparts had been almost totally removed around 1750.

=== Inner ditch and rampart ===
The inner ditch was of V-section, 3.5 metres deep and 8.8 metres wide. Postholes for upright beams were found at the front of the inner rampart. These posts would have held horizontal timbers forming a wooden revetment to the front of the rampart. The rampart was composed of sand and gravel dug from the ditches, together with a wall of cut and laid turf into which the posts had been recessed. Additional postholes were discovered 5.8 metres behind the front postholes. These presumably held anchor timbers for the front wall, although the 5.8 metre distance between the rows is thought somewhat excessive for simple cross-bracing.

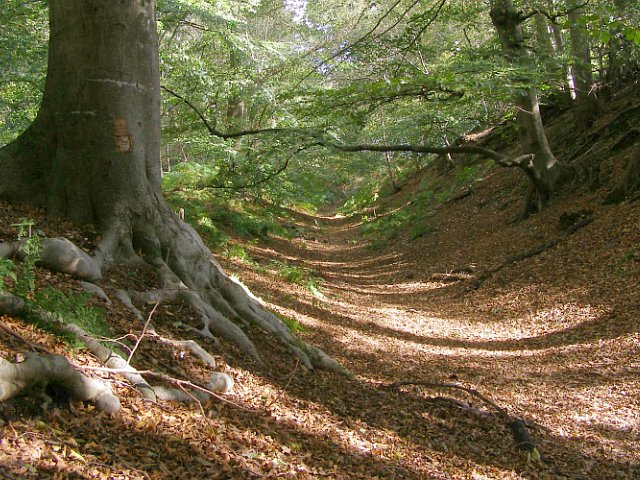
Inner ditch in the northern ramparts of Buckland Rings

=== Middle rampart ===
The middle rampart was apparently rather lower than the inner rampart, since the middle ditch was rather smaller than the inner ditch. Only one posthole was found, but it is thought that this rampart also had a wall-and-fill structure with upright beams and a facing wall of cut and laid turf.

=== Entrance ===
The entrance was a narrow passage extending some 60 metres in length from the outer edge of the second ditch to gates at the inmost end. The width of the passage varied between 8 and 12 metres along most of its length before narrowing to some 3 to 3.5 metres at the gates. The gates were supported on timbers in two massive holes, 90 centimetres in diameter.

=== Evaluation ===
The finds from the excavation were very few, and of limited help in dating the site. A small iron chain was found, consisting of a circular ring and remains of five oval links. There were also a few scraps of Iron-Age pottery, and a fragment of a bronze tube believed to be a "horn-cap," a type of object which it is believed was mounted on the ends of chariot yokes. Hawkes himself believed that the fort was built in the first century BC and was demolished in about 43 AD, possibly by the Romans. Advances in Iron-Age archaeology since the 1930s have now led modern archaeologists to adopt a longer chronology for the site. The site may date from the Early to Middle Iron-Age (c. 5th century BC) and may have started out with a single bank and ditch system. Later the ramparts may have been refurbished, and the outer ramparts were added to the original construction. Many hillforts in southern England had been abandoned well before the Roman conquest, and Buckland Rings may have fallen out use by the 1st century BC. The finds from excavation are stored in Winchester.

== 1993 survey ==
A geophysical survey was conducted in the interior of Buckland Rings in 1993 using magnetometry. However, geological conditions at the site for magnetic detection of archaeology were discovered to be poor and features such as posthole structures were undetectable. The survey was able to trace the course of the missing defences, locate the position of Hawkes's excavations, and partially define the entrance features. Evidence of settlement activity, however, was inconclusive.

== The site today ==
Today the site is well preserved, and the only obvious damage is where parts of the eastern ramparts were flattened in the 18th century, and where the outer rampart on the western side has been encroached upon by the road. In addition, two houses were built inside the west end of the fort in the early twentieth century. In 1986, a property developer announced plans to build a leisure centre inside Buckland Rings. These plans were rejected in a public inquiry in 1988. Since 1989 Buckland Rings has been in the care and ownership of Hampshire County Council and it is now open to visitors on foot. Buckland Rings is now a Scheduled Ancient Monument. There is also a bicycle Dirt jumping track adjacent to Buckland rings situated in a disused gravel pit.

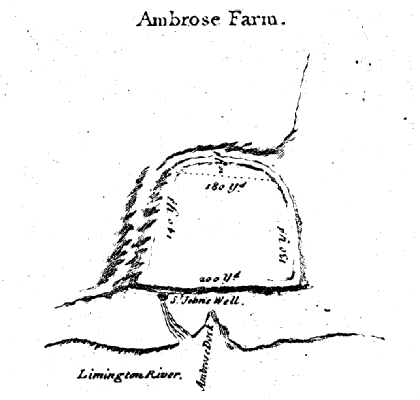
Ampress Camp as depicted by Thomas Wright in 1744. North is to the right

== Ampress Camp ==
Close to Buckland Rings is another earthwork enclosure known as Ampress Camp (or Ampress Hole) (grid reference SZ320970). It lies 360 metres east of Buckland Rings alongside Lymington River, and about 200 metres north of Lymington New Forest Hospital. Ampress Camp was noted by Thomas Wright in 1744, who described it as "upon a lower Ground, close by a River (which defends it on one Side), with a Ditch and Vallum half round, and a kind of Morass on the other." The outer rampart depicted by Wright has long since been flattened, and the ditches have been filled in. Waterworks occupy the northern part of the site, and commercial buildings have encroached upon the western half. Part of the interior (the southeastern part) is still viewable as a field, and a sunken lane runs a short distance along the line of the southern inner ditch. There have been only limited excavations, but a few scraps of pottery found at the site may date from the Iron Age. If the camp does date from the Iron Age, then it is unusual to have two Iron Age camps so close together. Ampress Camp may perhaps have formed a beachhead for the inhabitants of Buckland Rings, or it may have been occupied during a different period of the Iron Age.
