= Stanhope House =

Building in Mayfair, London, England

Coordinates: 51°30′24″N 0°09′07″W

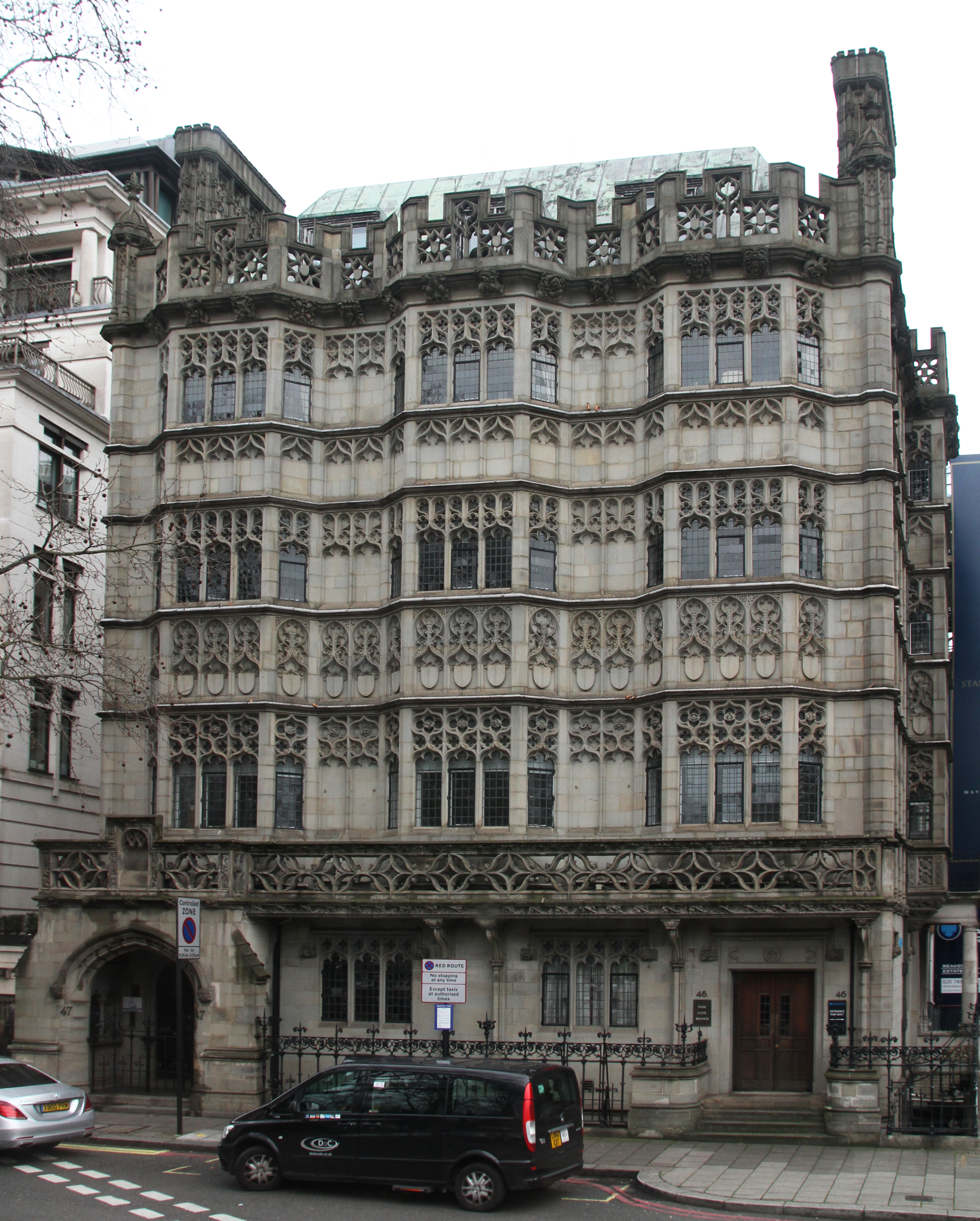
Stanhope House in 2016

Stanhope House is a Grade II listed building at 46 and 47 Park Lane in the Mayfair area of London, England.

It was built in 1899–1901 to a design by W. H. Romaine-Walker and Francis Besant. The building was commissioned by the soap manufacturer Robert William Hudson.

It was Grade II listed in 1958. In 1969–1970, after a fire, the interior was renovated.

The building is now commercial offices. In 1999, it was purchased, refurbished and let out as offices by HAB Group, a privately owned property development and investment company in the Turks and Caicos Islands.

Stanhope House and Dudley House are the only two left of the original ten mansions that lined Park Lane in 1900.
