= Robert William Hudson =

British businessman (1856–1937)

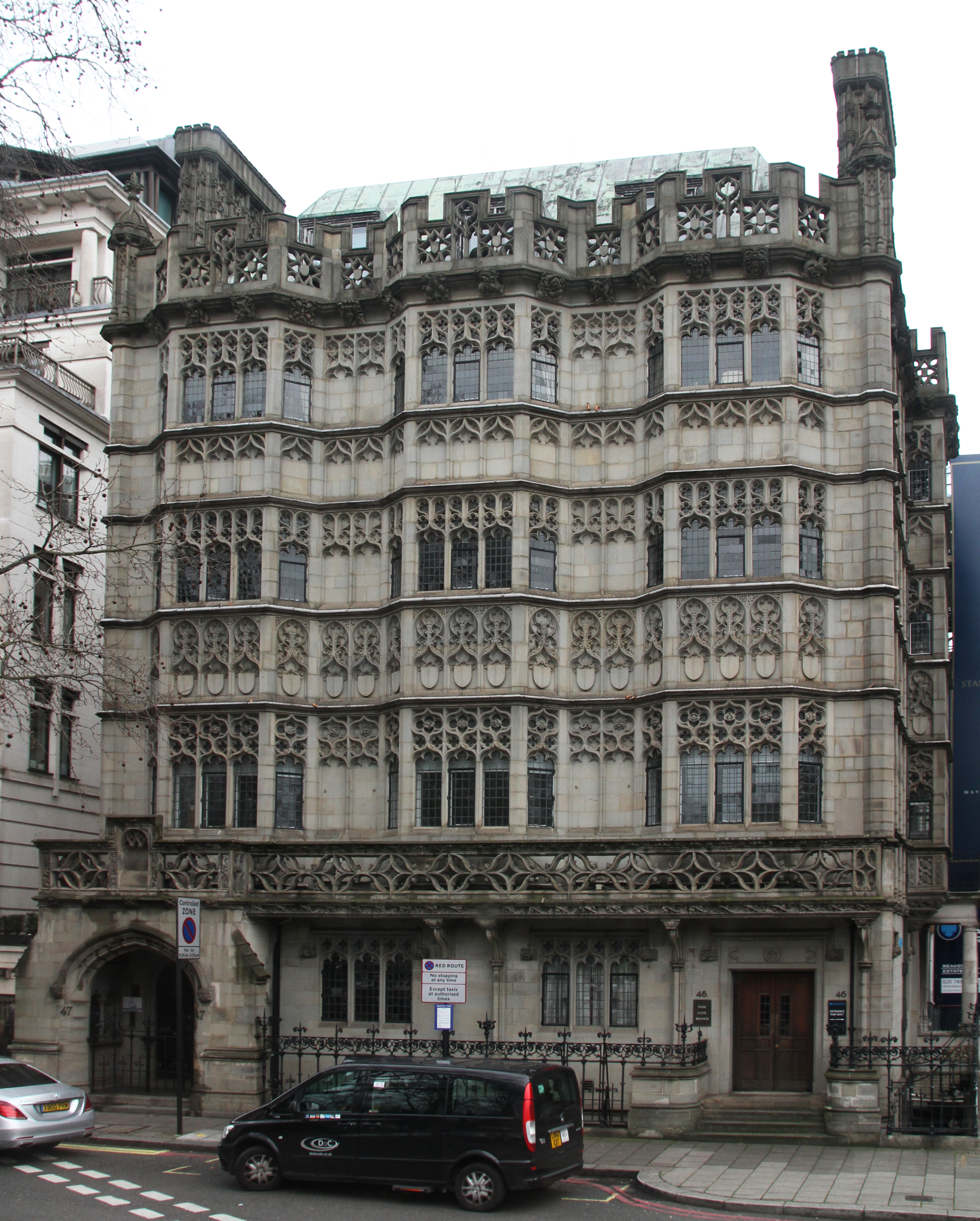
Stanhope House, 46-47 Park Lane, London, 2016

Robert William Hudson (1856–1937) was born in West Bromwich, the eldest son of Robert Spear Hudson who had founded a soap-flake manufacturing business. Hudson managed his father's company until it was taken over by Lever Brothers Ltd in 1908.

He built a house called 'Bidston Court' on Bidston Hill in Birkenhead in 1891 in Birkenhead. It was designed by Edward Ould, who also designed some of the houses in Port Sunlight Village, it was inspired by 16th-century Little Moreton Hall in Cheshire. Germany's Crown Prinz Wilhelm was so impressed with the house that in 1913 he built a similar house, the Cecilienhof in Potsdam. The house was sold in 1921 to Sir Ernest Royden and in 1928 it was moved to its present site at Royden Park, brick by brick, finally being completed in 1931. There it was renamed Hill Bark. The original site of the house on Vyner Road South was given to Birkenhead Corporation and became a public park in 1969.

In 1899 he commissioned the architects W. H. Romaine-Walker and Francis Besant to build him a house at 46 Park Lane, London. 'As it was especially desired by the owner that the Gothic style should be adopted, the period selected was the late fourteenth-century, with flamboyant feeling in the tracery and mouldings.' One of the most striking buildings on Park Lane, the building was originally called Stanhope House and it survives with its exterior largely unchanged. Today the ground floor houses a branch of IBV International Vaults.

Hudson moved to Danesfield House in Buckinghamshire, where he became High Sheriff in 1903. His first marriage was to Gerda Frances Marion Bushell (died 1932). Among their offspring was Robert Spear Hudson, 1st Viscount Hudson. He married Beatrice Sabina Gaudengio, daughter of Laurenzo Gaudengio, in 1932.

Beatrice Sabina Hudson subsequently moved to live in Monaco at the Villa Paloma on the Bvd Des Jardins Exotiques. The Villa Paloma was subsequently sold to the Fissore family, a leading billionaire Monegasque family.
