= W. H. Romaine-Walker =

English architect and interior decorator

William Henry Romaine-Walker (27 January 1854 – 10 May 1940) was an English architect and interior decorator, and artist.

== Life ==
Romaine-Walker was born in Bury, Lancashire, the son of Rev. John Walker and Caroline Spencer Walker. His father was the vicar at St Saviour's, Pimlico. He was educated at Lancing College, and then articled to the architect George Edmund Street. He was elected an Associate of the Royal Institute of British Architects in 1881, and in the same year began working in a partnership with Augustus William Tanner, which lasted until 1896.

While best known for his architecture, Walker was also an illustrator and painter, as "W. H. Walker" or "William Henry Walker". Among his publications were a 1907 edition of Alice in Wonderland. He also had numerous solo exhibitions at his family's Bond Street art gallery, "Walker's Galleries".

== Works ==
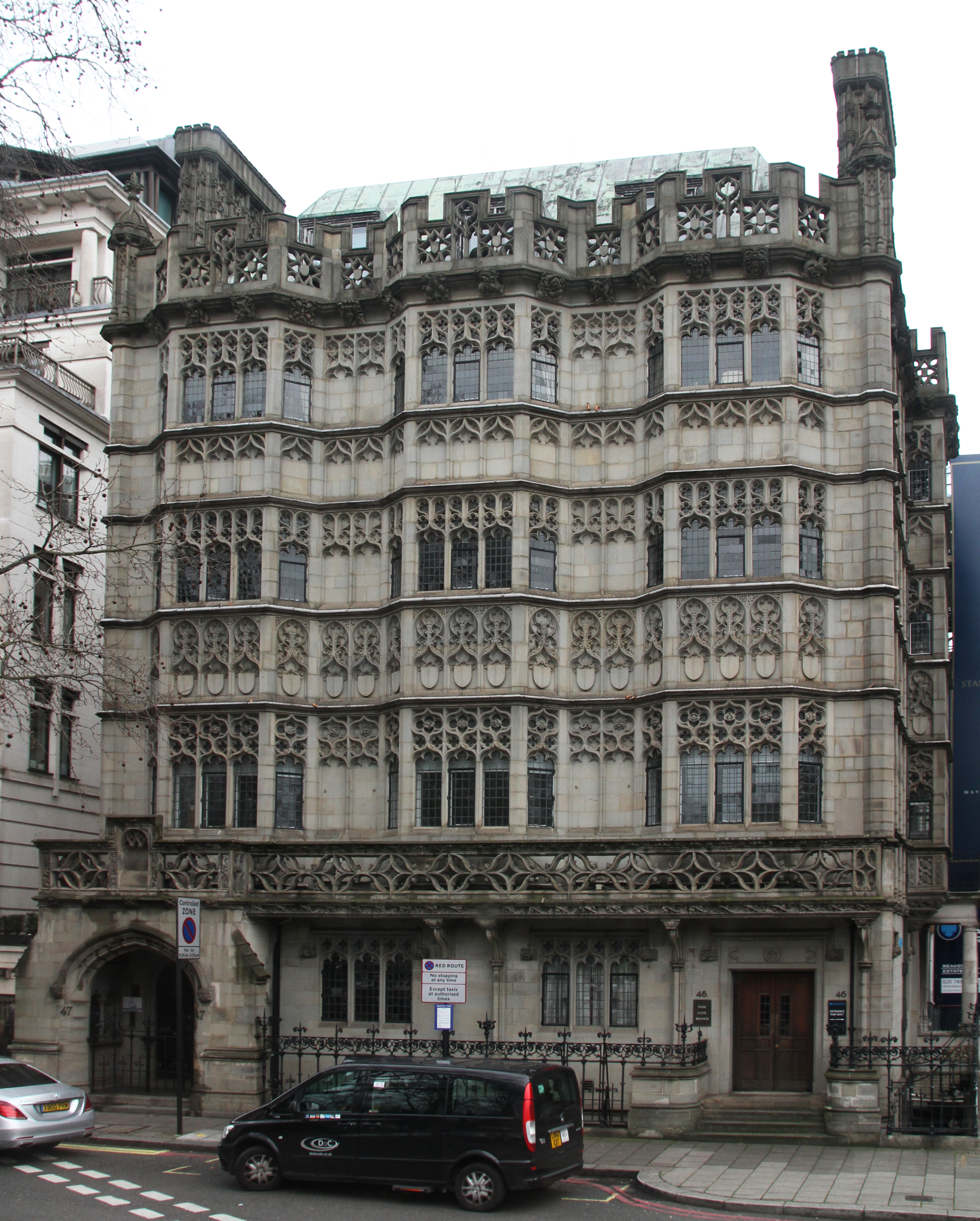
Stanhope House, 46–47 Park Lane, London, 2016

These include:

- Stanhope House, Park Lane, London (1899–1901), ornate Gothic mansion, with Besant.
- St. James, Hampton Hill, tower added to William Wigginton's earlier church, to celebrate Queen Victoria's Golden Jubilee (1887–88).
- Canford School, Canford Magna, Dorset, extended (with Tanner) (1888).
- Medmenham Abbey, Medmenham, Buckinghamshire, west wing added and remainder of the house much restored (1898) for Robert Hudson
- Danesfield House, Medmenham, Buckinghamshire, for Robert Hudson (1899–1901)
- Church of St. Saviour, Newtown, Dorset (1892) with Tanner.
- Beaumont College, Old Windsor, Berkshire: interior decoration (1902).
- Her Majesty's Theatre, London. Interior decoration (1897).
- St Michael's Church, Brighton (circa 1900). Internal features.
- Church of St John the Evangelist, Upper Parkstone, Poole, Dorset, with Besant (1902–03).
- Moreton Hall, Warwickshire (1906)
- Knowsley Hall, Merseyside. Modifications for the 17th Earl of Derby (1908–12)
- Tate Gallery extensions (1910, 1926, 1937)
- Buckland House, Buckland, Oxfordshire, alterations and additions (c 1910).
- Chatsworth House rebuilding of main staircase (1911–12).
- Liverpool Town Hall (1913). Internal modifications and decorations (with Jenkins)
- Great Fosters. Modifications (1918–19).
