= Medmenham =

Village in Buckinghamshire, England

Coordinates: 51°33′14″N 0°50′17″W

- Village
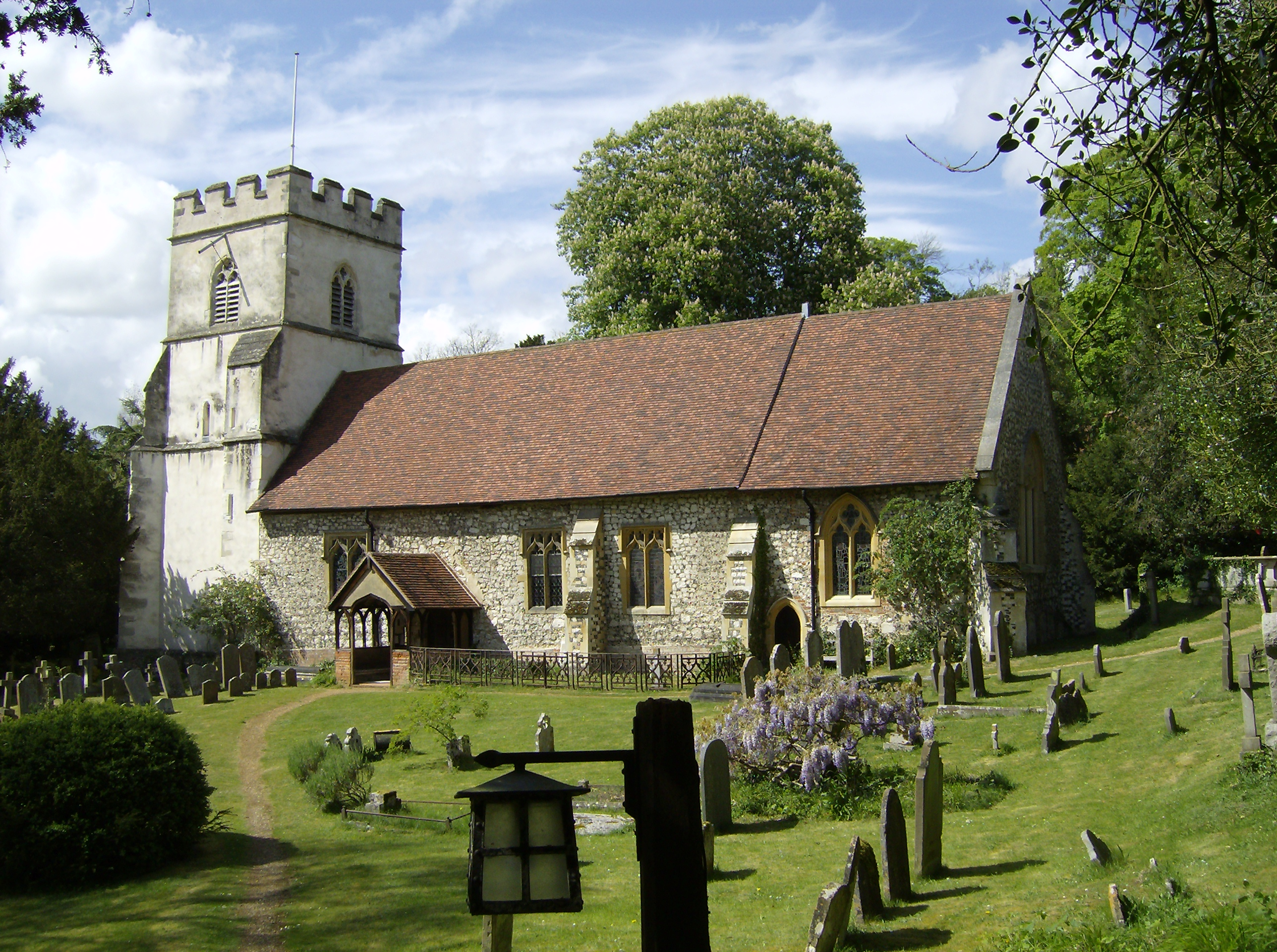
- St Peter's Parish Church

- Location within Buckinghamshire
- Population: 1,030 (2011)
- OS grid reference: SU8084
- Civil parish: Medmenham
- Unitary authority: Buckinghamshire
- Ceremonial county: Buckinghamshire
- Region: South East
- Country: England
- Sovereign state: United Kingdom
- Post town: MARLOW
- Postcode district: SL7
- Dialling code: 01491
- Police: Thames Valley
- Fire: Buckinghamshire
- Ambulance: South Central
- UK Parliament: Wycombe

Medmenham (/ˈmɛdənəm/) is a village and civil parish in south-west Buckinghamshire, England. It is on the River Thames, about 3 1/2 miles (5.6 km) southwest of Marlow and 3 miles (4.8 km) east of Henley-on-Thames. The parish also includes Danesfield, a housing estate predominantly for RAF officers, although families of other ranks from the RAF, Royal Navy and British Army also live there.

== Toponym ==
The toponym is derived from the Old English for "middle-sized homestead". An alternative explanation of the name is from the Saxon leader Meda, whose followers were known as Medings, hence Medin'ham, Medham, or Medmenham. It was recorded in the Domesday Book of 1086 as Medmeham.

== Features ==
The village includes some old timber framed brick and flint cottages and some estate workers cottages built at the beginning of the 20th century from local chalk rock. The Church of England parish church of Saint Peter was heavily restored in 1839. The Dog and Badger Inn on the A4155 road dates from late in the 16th century, the name having been transferred from the inn at Hambleden which was renamed the Stag and Huntsman.

The village lane ends at the Old Ferry crossing which ceased to be used after the Second World War. It was where the Thames towpath crossed from the Buckinghamshire to Berkshire bank of the river. On the towpath beside the former ferry crossing stands the large Medmenham Ferry Memorial that commemorates Lord Devonport's successful 1899 defence of the public right-of-way over the ferry.

Next to the village, but separated from it by the A4155, is the first of two Iron Age hill forts, Medmenham Camp. Danesfield Camp also known as Danes Ditches is located slightly further along the road to the east near to the village of Hurley.

Also attached to the village are the hamlets of Lower Woodend and Rockwell End.

== Abbey ==
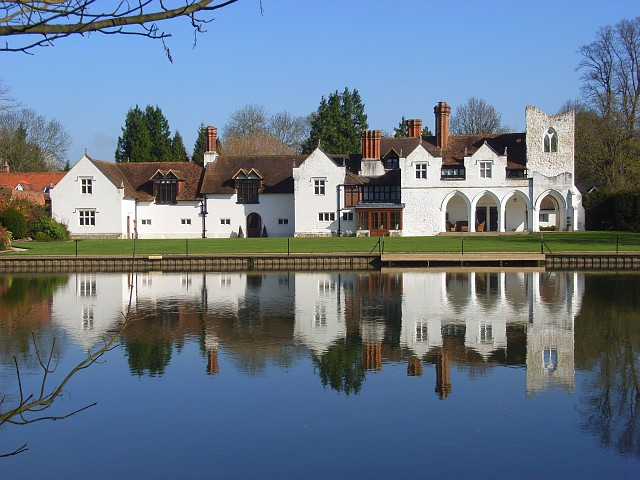
Medmenham Abbey

A Cistercian abbey was founded in Medmenham in the 12th century under the ownership of Woburn Abbey, though it was not officially recognised by royal charter until 1200. It was dedicated to St. Mary but closed in 1536. In 1547, at the Dissolution of the Monasteries, the abbey was seized and given to the Moore family and then sold privately to the Duffields. It was while in the possession of the Duffields that the abbey became infamous as the location of The Hellfire Club, headed by Sir Francis Dashwood, formerly called the Monks of Medmenham who used it for "obscene parodies of religious rites" according to one source, between the mid 1700s and 1774, though the club was already in disrepute by 1762. During that era, it was renovated to resemble a Gothic building. Eventually, the meetings were moved out of the abbey into a series of tunnels and caves in West Wycombe Hill.

Years later, the West Wycombe Caves in which the "friars" met became a tourist site known as the "Hell Fire Caves".

Dashwood had leased the ruins of the abbey from the Duffield family. After the club was defunct (by 1763), the property was sold to the chief justice of Chester. In 1898 the building was modified, and since then it has no longer resembled an abbey. Subsequent renovations were completed in the 20th century.

Today the building is a private residence and is not open to the public. A report in 2015 indicated it had been owned by a German family with a part of the abbey purchased in the 1970s and the rest in the mid 1990s. The property was listed for sale at the time. The report indicated that the 12,000sq ft interior included "nine bedrooms ..., six reception rooms, a gymnasium, a bar, a housekeeper’s cottage and staff offices". The property has been Grade II listed since 1955. By that time, it had been converted from a mansion into two houses, using some of the masonry from the original Abbey. The summary confirms that the house had been modified in 1755 for Sir Francis Dashwood and restored and extended in 1898.

== Landmarks of the Civil Parish ==
- Danesfield House
- RAF Medmenham
