= Danesfield House =

Country house in Buckinghamshire, England

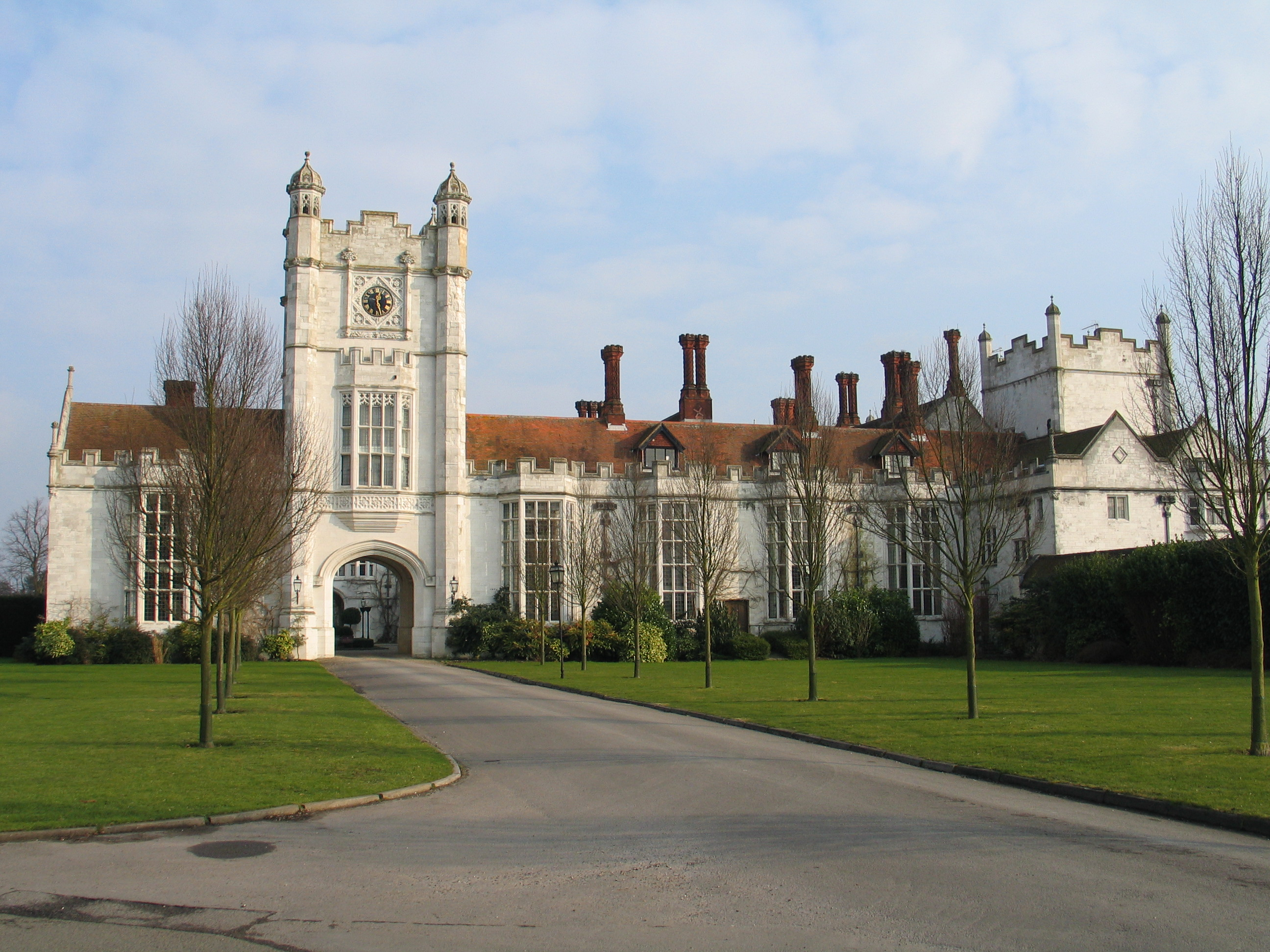

- Location within Buckinghamshire
- 51°33′11″N 0°49′26″W
- Type: Country House
- Location: Medmenham, Buckinghamshire
- OS grid reference: SU816843

History
- Built: 1899-1901

Site notes
- Architect: W. H. Romaine-Walker
- Architectural style: Neo-Tudor
- Owner: Danesfield House Hotel Ltd

Listed Building – Grade II*
- Designated: 9 August 1977
- Reference no.: 1310810

Danesfield House in Medmenham, near Marlow, Buckinghamshire, England, in the Chiltern Hills is a former country house now used as a hotel and spa. The house stands on a plateau which shelves steeply down to the River Thames to the south.

== History ==
The house is located on the site of a large multivallate hillfort known as Danesfield Camp, which originally had ramparts to north, east and west. Chalk cliffs to the south form a roughly rectangular plateau. Antiquarian Thomas Langley reported in 1797, that the site was a Danish encampment (hence "Danes-field"), but that interpretation was challenged by later finds of artefacts from the Neolithic, Bronze and Iron Ages. Medmenham Camp, a slight univallate hillfort, lies about 1 km to the west. Both are scheduled monuments.

The estate was acquired by Edmund Medlycott in 1664. He and his family occupied a farmhouse here, known as Medlycotts. The house was rented to Mrs Morton in 1725. Her son, John Morton, was a barrister and became Attorney-General to Queen Charlotte and Chief Justice of Chester (1762–1780). He also sat as Member of Parliament for Abingdon (1747–1770), New Romney (1770–1774) and Wigan (1775–1780). He acquired the estate's freehold in 1750, and later added extra land. He also bought the ruins of nearby Medmenham Abbey in 1778. He had the existing house demolished and built a new one which he named Danesfield. This house stood to the north of the prehistoric ramparts.

Morton's widow sold the estate to Robert Scott of Wimpole Street in 1787. Scott rebuilt the house in a typical Georgian classical style. The estate eventually passed to his nephew, Charles Robert Scott-Murray, MP for Buckinghamshire from 1841 to 1845. After he converted to Catholicism in 1845, he added a chapel to the house, one of the last designs by Augustus Pugin. Scott-Murray died in August 1882.

The house was let for a period. In the spring of 1894, Danesfield House was rented by Mrs. William Kissam Vanderbilt (Alva Belmont), mother of Consuelo Vanderbilt, the future Duchess of Marlborough, after a cruise in the Mediterranean aboard the Vanderbilt yacht Valiant ended abruptly and Mrs. Vanderbilt began considering divorce. The property was sold in 1897 to Robert William Hudson, son and heir of Victorian soap entrepreneur Robert Spear Hudson.

== Present house ==
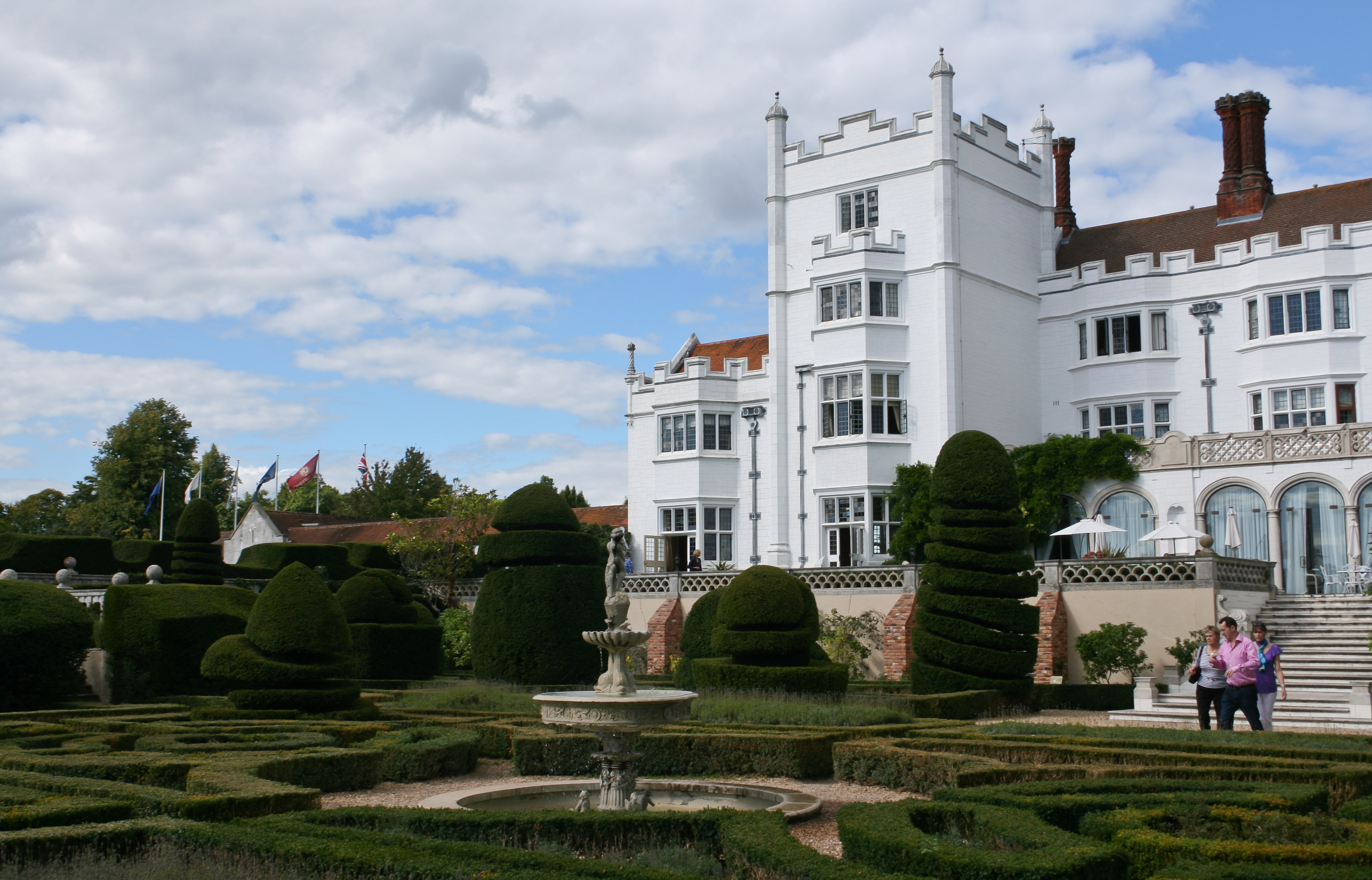
Topiary gardens and the south face of the hotel

A new house in a Neo-Tudor style was built from 1899 to 1901, designed by architect W. H. Romaine-Walker. This building was constructed in the northwestern quarter of the prehistoric ramparts, with the western ramparts being levelled to improve access. When the new building was completed, the old house and chapel were demolished. Shortly after it was completed, the estate was sold by Hudson to a property speculator, Mr Hossack, and then to Mrs Arthur Hornby Lewis.

Mrs Hornby Lewis died in 1930, and left the estate on trust for her 16-year-old grand niece Elizabeth Whitelaw. The trustees sold the estate in 1938 before she took possession. It was bought and renovated by Stanley Garton, but the Second World War intervened, and it became the temporary home of 80 boys from Colet Court prep school, evacuated from Hammersmith.

The house was requisitioned by the Air Ministry for the RAF to set up a Joint Service Imagery Intelligence (IMINT) Unit and was known as RAF Medmenham. Danesfield House was to IMINT what Bletchley Park was to Signals Intelligence (SIGINT). The RAF added many temporary wooden structures, and it was bought by the Air Ministry in 1948 to become the divisional headquarters for No. 90 Group RAF (Signals). The house was officers' accommodation, with the Grand Banqueting Hall used as the officers' mess.

The house was sold to the milk processing company Carnation in 1977, to become its corporate headquarters. It became a country house hotel in 1991. It is a Grade II* listed building. The north and west lodges, steps, walls and fountain in the garden are Grade II listed.
