= Moreton Hall, Warwickshire =

Country house in Moreton Morrell, Warwickshire, England

Coordinates: 52.1971°N 1.5554°W

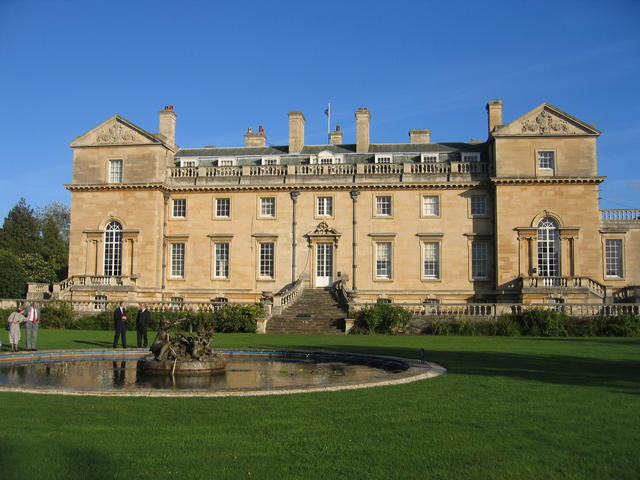

Moreton Hall is a Grade II listed, Georgian styled Edwardian house, built in the early 1900s and located in Moreton Morrell, Warwickshire, England. It is the location of Moreton Morrel Centre, the agricultural campus of Warwickshire College.

== History ==
In the early 1900s, Charles Tuller Garland, son of the co-founder of the New York based National City Bank, decided to build a house in South Warwickshire countryside, with views over the River Avon valley. Designed by the fashionable society architect and decorator W. H. Romaine-Walker, it was inspired by Wilton House near Salisbury, and given a Palladian style. Built in 1906/7, designed for lavish entertaining, the Hall has sumptuous plasterwork, particularly in the barrel-vaulted great hall, library and dining room. Romaine-Walker also landscaped the grounds, with a Wellingtonia-lined drive leading to the hall, its manicured blue garden, polo school and other equestrian facilities. In 1913 Moreton Hall and the associated Morton Farm were purchased by Gilbert Player. The hall was gutted by a major fire on 20 March 2008.

== Moreton Morrell Centre ==
After the Second World War, the grounds of Moreton Morrell were used to accommodate a farm-training institute by the Warwickshire Agricultural Committee, later absorbed as part of Warwickshire College as its Moreton Morrell Centre, which is one of the country's premier centres for agricultural, horticultural and equine training. The campus includes stabling for more than 100 horses and an equine demonstration area, and there is a 345-hectare farm with a dairy herd, pedigree sheep flock and pedigree beef herd.
