= 67th Siege Battery, Royal Garrison Artillery =

67th Siege Battery, RGA
- Cap Badge of the Royal Regiment of Artillery
- Active: 9 October 1915 – 3 May 1921
- Country: United Kingdom
- Branch: British Army
- Role: Siege artillery
- Part of: Royal Garrison Artillery
- Garrison/HQ: Broughty Ferry; Fort Wallington
- Engagements: Somme; Arras; Ypres; Hundred Days Offensive

67th Siege Battery was a heavy artillery unit of the Royal Garrison Artillery (RGA) formed in Scotland during World War I. It saw active service on the Western Front at the Somme, Arras, Ypres, and in the final Hundred Days Offensive.

== Mobilisation ==
On the outbreak of war in 1914 the part-time Territorial Force (TF) was mobilised at its war stations, including the North Scottish Royal Garrison Artillery, a coast defence unit at Broughty Ferry on the Firth of Tay. Shortly afterwards TF units were invited to volunteer for Overseas Service and on 15 August 1914, the War Office (WO) issued instructions to separate those men who had signed up for Home Service only, and form these into reserve units. On 31 August, the formation of a reserve or 2nd Line unit was authorised for each 1st Line unit where 60 per cent or more of the men had volunteered for Overseas Service. In this way duplicate companies and batteries were created, releasing the 1st Line units to be sent overseas.

By October 1914, the campaign on the Western Front was bogging down into Trench warfare and there was an urgent need for batteries of Siege artillery to be sent to France. The WO decided that the TF coastal gunners were well enough trained to take over many of the duties in the coastal defences, releasing regular gunners for service in the field, and 1st line RGA companies that had volunteered for overseas service were authorised to increase their strength by 50 per cent.

During 1915 the WO began to form new RGA siege batteries based on cadres from TF coast defence units. 67th Siege Battery was formed at Dover under WO Instruction 144 of 6 October 1915 from one company of the North Scottish RGA, which provided roughly half the personnel, the remainder being New Army Volunteers. Together with 66th Siege Bty, it constituted S Siege Brigade (Training) formed at Lydd Camp on 28 October.

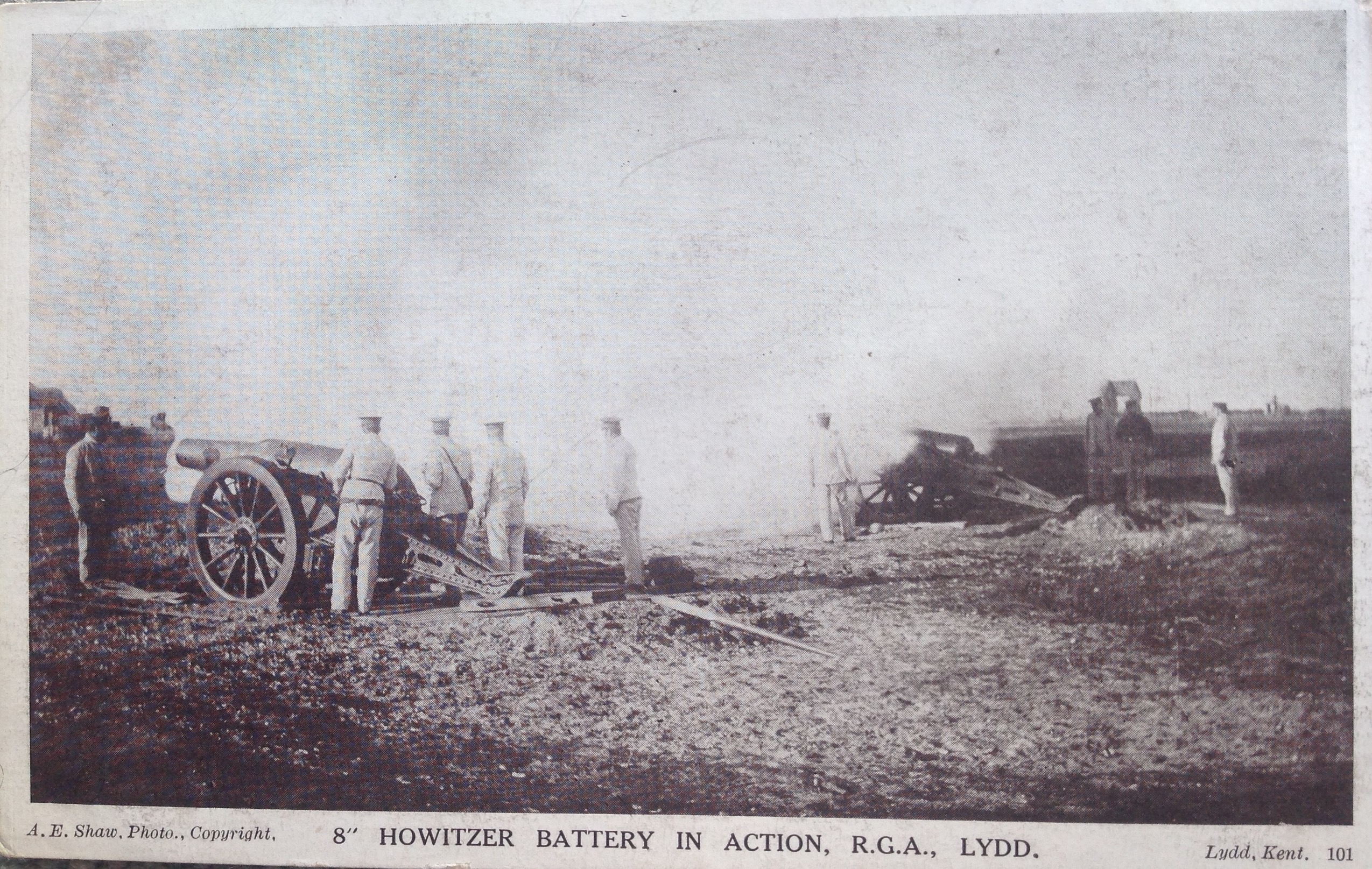
RML 8-inch howitzers being fired at Lydd, ca, 1903.

Major R.H. Brent Clark, a Regular RGA officer, was appointed to command the battery, but soon afterwards applied to be transferred to 76th Siege Bty, the cadre of which had been provided by the Essex & Suffolk RGA, of which he had been adjutant before the war.

At Lydd the men were introduced to modern heavy guns, but did gun drill on 9.45-inch Skoda howitzers from the Second Boer War and their actual field firing with 8-inch rifled muzzle-loading howitzers dating from 1879. Other units under training at Lydd at this time included 76th and 69th Siege Btys and five South African Heavy Artillery batteries (71st, 72nd, 73rd, 74th, 75th).

651 Company, Army Service Corps (ASC), was formed on 15 February 1916, as the battery's Ammunition Column Motor Transport.

== Service ==
The battery went out to the Western Front on 18 March 1916 manning four 8-inch howitzers. At this stage of the war the 8-inch howitzers in use (Marks I–V) were improvised from cut-down and bored-out barrels of 6-inch coast defence guns, with the recoil checked by enormous wooden wedges. On 31 March the battery joined 18th Heavy Artillery Brigade, moving to 30th Heavy Artillery Brigade a week later.

In April 1916 the heavy artillery on the Western Front was reorganised. The Heavy Artillery Brigades became Heavy Artillery Groups (HAGs) and batteries were switched between HAGs as required. At the same time the siege batteries' ASC companies were absorbed into heavy artillery ammunition columns on 25 April. 67th Siege Bty moved to 44th (South African) HAG on 27 April and then to 21st HAG on 15 June.

=== Somme ===
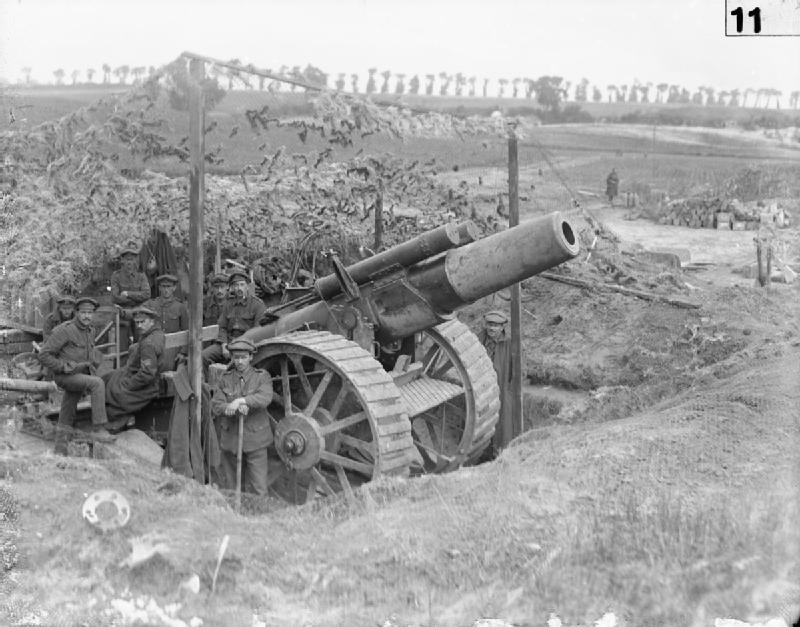
8-inch Howitzer Mk I on the Somme, July 1916.

21st Heavy Artillery Group was with Fourth Army preparing for that summer's 'Big Push' (the Battle of the Somme). It was one of the groups assigned to XV Corps facing the Fricourt Salient, a position of considerable strength in the German line.

The bombardment programme was to extend over five days, U, V, W, X and Y, before the assault was launched on Z day. The strenuous work of firing the heavy guns and howitzers was divided into 2-hour periods to allow the gunners to rest, Forward Observation Officers (FOOs) to be relieved, and the guns to cool. The bombardment began on 24 June, but on several days the weather was too bad for good air or ground observation and the programme was extended by two days (Y1 and Y2). On XV Corps' front, the HAGs were swamped with calls for counter-battery (CB) fire from FOOs, observation aircraft and balloons, and accurate observation was made difficult by the number of shells bursting; luckily the German artillery opposite was dealt with very effectively by the divisional field guns.

At 06.25 on Z Day (1 July) the final bombardment began. When the infantry launched their assault at 07.30, XV Corps made better progress than most other parts of the front, with 7th Division fighting its way into Mametz, then 21st Division enveloped Fricourt, albeit with appalling casualties in some units. Fricourt was captured without opposition during the night. XV Corps could have pushed forward on 2 July if its neighbouring formations had not already suffered disaster, but opposition stiffened as the day went on.

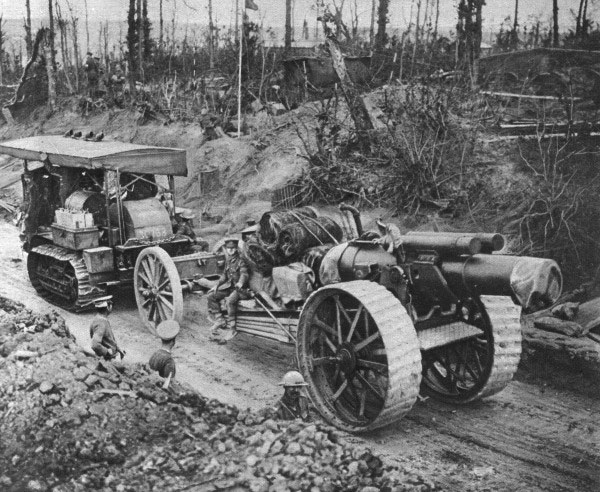
8-inch Howitzer Mk I under tow by a Holt 75 tractor on the Somme, July 1916.

On 21 September the battery was joined by the Right Half of 135th Siege Bty, which had just completed a month's familiarisation with 57th Siege Bty at Fricourt and Contalmaison. The half battery (two 8-inch howitzers) continued its training alongside 67th Siege Bty until the end of the month. XV Corps fight on throughout the Somme Offensive, including the battles for High Wood, Delville Wood, Flers and the Transloy Ridges until the middle of October. 67th Siege Bty was transferred to 3rd HAG on 2 December, exchanged its ASC ammunition column with that from 135th Siege Bty, which was going back for rest. 67th Siege Bty itself was taken out of the line for rest on 16 January 1917.

=== Arras ===
The battery joined VI Corps' Heavy Artillery in Third Army on 2 February 1917, but until 3 March its men were employed in digging positions and their guns were not in action. When the battery was reunited with its guns it was in 47th HAG, then moved briefly to 34th HAG (20 March) followed by 10th HAG three days later. 10th HAG was assigned to support VI Corps in the forthcoming Battle of Arras.

There were many more guns available for this attack and the artillery plan was much more carefully worked out than previous operations. It began with systematic CB work to put the German artillery out of action. Then, at Zero hour on 9 April, howitzers laid a standing barrage on the German trenches. VI Corps' attack was relatively successful. However, the follow-up over succeeding days was less successful, the guns having to be moved forward through mud and destruction, and the later bombardments were rushed and less effective. 67th Siege Bty was moved to 72nd HAG on the second day of the battle. Fighting on the Arras front dragged on into May.

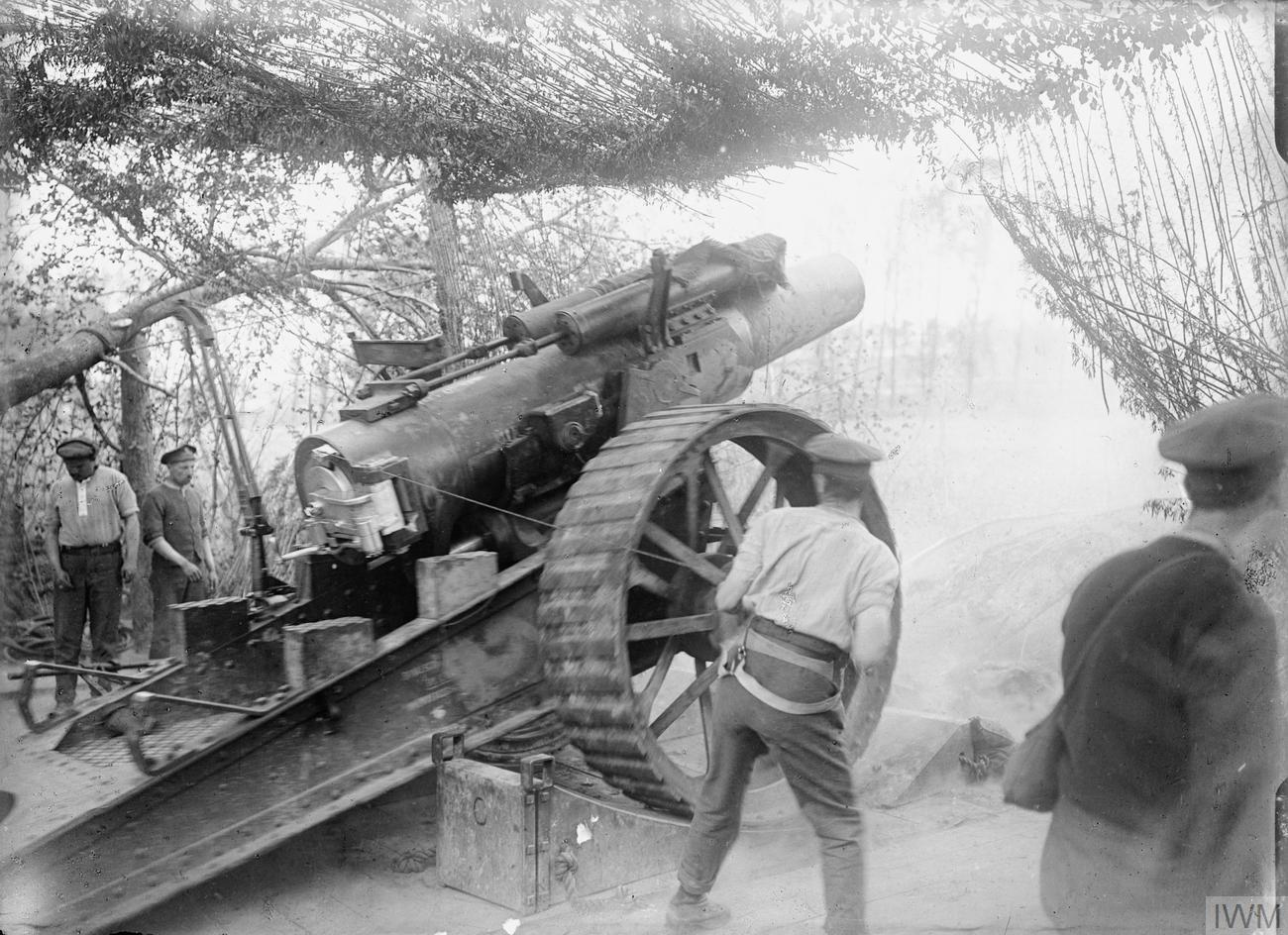
8-inch Howitzer at almost full recoil.

=== Ypres ===
67th Siege Bty transferred to 42nd HAG in Fifth Army in the Ypres Salient on 19 May. It was then made up to six howitzers and was joined in June by the personnel of a section from newly-arrived 318th Siege Bty. This battery had been formed at Prees Heath Camp the previous December but the men had trained on 6-inch howitzers. (The other section of 318th reinforced 145th Siege Bty at the same time.) On 29 June the expanded battery switched to 99th HAG in Second Army as Second and Fifth Armies prepared for the forthcoming Third Ypres Offensive. Second Army's role was to provide flank support, but as the campaign bogged down it took over direction of the battle in September. The Battles of the Menin Road, Polygon Wood and Broodseinde were highly successful because of the weight of artillery brought to bear on German positions. But as the offensive continued with the Poelcappelle and First and Second Battles of Passchendaele, the tables were turned: British batteries were clearly observable from the Passchendaele Ridge and were subjected to CB fire, while their own guns sank into the mud and became difficult to aim and fire. 67th Siege Bty had been with 16th HAG from 29 September, then with 1st Canadian HAG from 24 October, supporting the Canadian Corps at Passchendaele to the end of the fighting.

=== Spring Offensive ===
67th Siege Bty moved to 2nd HAG on 14 December and a week later to 62nd HAG, when it was rested from 23 December to 15 January 1918. By now HAG allocations were becoming more fixed, and on 1 February 1918 they were converted into permanent RGA brigades. 62nd Brigade was defined as a Mixed Brigade, with guns and howitzers of several sizes. 67th Siege Bty remained with this brigade until the Armistice.

62nd Bde RGA transferred to Third Army on 14 March 1918. A week later the German spring offensive was launched. Part of Third Army was engaged in the desperate fighting, but overall it was not obliged to retreat as far or to abandon as many heavy guns as Fifth Army further south. The German offensive had been halted on Third Army's front by 5 April.

=== Hundred Days ===
Third Army joined in the Allies' victorious Hundred Days Offensive with the Battle of Albert on 23/24 August. 50th Brigade led 17th (Northern) Division's attack across the old Somme battlefield, supported by 62nd Bde RGA. It swept through the Stuff and Swaben Redoubts, which had caused so many problems in 1916, and on through Thiepval. But then the brigade got lost in the ruins with no landmarks, and the advance ended in confusion.

By the end of August 62nd Bde RGA was with XVII Corps, and stayed with it for the rest of the war. The corps' task on 2 September was to capture the southernmost part of the Drocourt-Quéant Switch Line (the Wotan Stellung) where it joined the Hindenburg Line. Zero hour was 05.00, and at 06.00 the heavy guns including 62nd Bde switched from CB work to firing at the ground ahead of the advancing infantry between the D-Q and Hindenburg lines and on Quéant and other localities. The successful advance of 57th (2nd West Lancashire) Division through this ground cracked open the defences and allowed the flanking divisions to force their way through the Hindenburg Support Position and across the roads behind.

Third Army continued its advance through the Hindenburg positions and across the Canal du Nord. On 8 October 62nd Bde supported XVII Corps in its attempt to encircle Cambrai from the south and compel its evacuation by the enemy. A harassing bombardment began on 6 October and continued intermittently until Zero hour at 04.30 on 8 October. 63rd (Royal Naval) Division took Niergnies and completed its task by the end of the day, despite counter-attacks.

On 12 October XVII Corps probed forwards towards the River Selle, finding the villages of Haussy, Montrécourt and Saulzoir strongly held. At 18.30 the 8th Battalion Queen's Royal Regiment (West Surrey) was sent forward while 62nd Bde bombarded the occupied villages for 50 minutes. The enemy cleared out of the part of Montrécourt west of the river and patrols from the Queen's managed to cross by the one remaining girder of a blown bridge.

Third Army resumed its attack (the Battle of the Selle) on 20 October, aiming to clear the remaining area west of the Selle, which was to be the start line for the next offensive. No preliminary barrage was fired, the infantry attacking at 02.00 under a full moon to achieve surprise. 62nd Bde supported XVII Corps' attack. The attacking division, 19th (Western), took Haussy and crossed the river. It then met tough opposition, but reached its final objective by 07.00 the following day.

The next set-piece attack was the Battle of the Sambre. Zero hour for Third Army was 05.30 on 4 November, and 19th and 24th Divisions of XVII Corps attacked with complete success – some units advancing beyond their objectives – supported by 62nd Bde and many other guns, some of which had to move forward during the morning to bring down fire on the further objectives in the afternoon.

By now the offensive had turned into a pursuit, and many of the heavy batteries had to be left behind. Fighting was ended on 11 November by the Armistice with Germany.

== Postwar ==
Unusually for a New Army unit, 67th Siege Battery was not disbanded after the Armistice with Germany but continued in the postwar Regular Army. On 28 June 1919 it reformed at Fort Wallington, Fareham, in XVII Brigade, RGA. In May 1920 the battery and brigade were redesignated as 39th (Howitzer) Bty in X Bde, RGA, and on 8 July they were designated as Medium artillery. On 3 May 1921 39th Medium Bty was absorbed into 6th Medium Bty, a pre-war Regular Army unit.

== Notes ==
- Anon, A History of the South African Heavy Artillery: Seventy-First Siege Battery July 1915–November 1918, London: Miles & Co, ca 1920/Uckfield: Naval & Military Press, 2013, ISBN 978-1-78151-987-5.
- Maj A.F. Becke,History of the Great War: Order of Battle of Divisions, Part 2b: The 2nd-Line Territorial Force Divisions (57th–69th), with the Home-Service Divisions (71st–73rd) and 74th and 75th Divisions, London: HM Stationery Office, 1937/Uckfield: Naval & Military Press, 2007, ISBN 1-84734-739-8.
- Maj A.F. Becke,History of the Great War: Order of Battle of Divisions, Part 4: The Army Council, GHQs, Armies, and Corps 1914–1918, London: HM Stationery Office, 1944/Uckfield: Naval & Military Press, 2007, ISBN 1-84734-743-6.
- Brig-Gen Sir James E. Edmonds, History of the Great War: Military Operations, France and Belgium, 1916, Vol I, London: Macmillan,1932/Woking: Shearer, 1986, ISBN 0-946998-02-7.
- Brig-Gen Sir James E. Edmonds, History of the Great War: Military Operations, France and Belgium 1918, Vol IV, 8th August–26th September: The Franco-British Offensive, London: Macmillan, 1939/Uckfield: Imperial War Museum and Naval & Military, 2009, ISBN 978-1-84574-728-2.
- Brig-Gen Sir James E. Edmonds & Lt-Col R. Maxwell-Hyslop, History of the Great War: Military Operations, France and Belgium 1918, Vol V, 26th September–11th November, The Advance to Victory, London: HM Stationery Office, 1947/Imperial War Museum and Battery Press, 1993, ISBN 1-870423-06-2.
- Gen Sir Martin Farndale, History of the Royal Regiment of Artillery: The Years of Defeat: Europe and North Africa, 1939–1941, Woolwich: Royal Artillery Institution, 1988/London: Brasseys, 1996, ISBN 1-85753-080-2.
- Don Farr, The Silent General: Horne of the First Army, Solihull, Helion, 2007, ISBN 978-1-874622-99-4.
- Gen Sir Anthony Farrar-Hockley, The Somme, London: Batsford, 1954/Pan 1966, ISBN 0-330-20162-X.
- J.B.M. Frederick, Lineage Book of British Land Forces 1660–1978, Vol II, Wakefield: Microform Academic, 1984, ISBN 1-85117-009-X.
- L.F. Penstone, The History of 76 Siege Battery, R.G.A., 1937/Uckfield: Naval & Military Press, 2009, ISBN 978-1-84574-080-1.
- Lt D.J. Walters & Lt C.R. Hurle Hobbs, The History of the 135th Siege Battery R.G.A., 1921/Uckfield: Naval & Military Press, 2004, ISBN 978-1-84342-983-8.
- War Office Instructions Issued During October 1915, London: HM Stationery Office.
- Leon Wolff, In Flanders Fields: The 1917 Campaign, London: Longmans, 1959/Corgi, 1966.
- Lt-Col Michael Young, Army Service Corps 1902–1918, Barnsley: Leo Cooper, 2000, ISBN 0-85052-730-9.

== External sources ==
- Mark Conrad, The British Army, 1914 (archive site)
