= 135th Siege Battery, Royal Garrison Artillery =

135th Siege Battery, RGA
- Royal Artillery cap badge
- Active: 13 May 1916–August 1919
- Country: United Kingdom
- Branch: British Army
- Role: Siege Artillery
- Part of: Royal Garrison Artillery
- Garrison/HQ: Tynemouth
- Engagements: Battle of the Somme; Battle of Arras; German spring offensive Hundred Days Offensive

135th Siege Battery was a heavy howitzer unit of Britain's Royal Garrison Artillery (RGA) raised during World War I. It saw active service on the Western Front at the Somme and Arras, against the German spring offensive, and in the final Allied Hundred Days Offensive.

== Mobilisation and training ==
Once the fighting on the Western Front had bogged down into Trench warfare in 1914, there was an urgent need for siege artillery. 135th Siege Bty was formed at Tynemouth in Northumberland under Army Council Instruction 996 of 13 May 1916. The gunners were drawn from Nos 12 and 47 Companies, RGA, which manned coast artillery in the Tynemouth Garrison (66 from No 12 Co and 44 from No 47). Most of them were recent recruits under the Derby Scheme (Note: The recruitment scheme drawn up by the Earl of Derby; one source misinterprets this to mean that the men for 135th Siege Bty came from Derby.) with just a few weeks' training. The first officers and warrant officers set up battery headquarters (BHQ) at the Temperance Hotel at Cullercoats. Ten non-commissioned officers (NCOs) arrived from the RGA's B Depot at Bexhill-on-Sea, together with the signal detachment of three NCOs and eight men from A Depot at Bexhill. Captain D.B.C. Sladen was appointed to command the battery.

The battery left Cullercoats on 4 June to join R Siege Brigade (Training) at Horsham and after a month moved to Lydd to complete its training, first with B Bde, then with C Bde. On 29 July the battery began to move to Bristol to mobilise, where its guns were waiting. The battery was equipped with four 8-inch howitzers. At this stage of the war the 8-inch howitzers in use (Marks I–V) were improvised from cut-down and bored-out barrels of 6-inch coast defence guns, with the recoil checked by enormous wooden wedges.

== Western Front ==
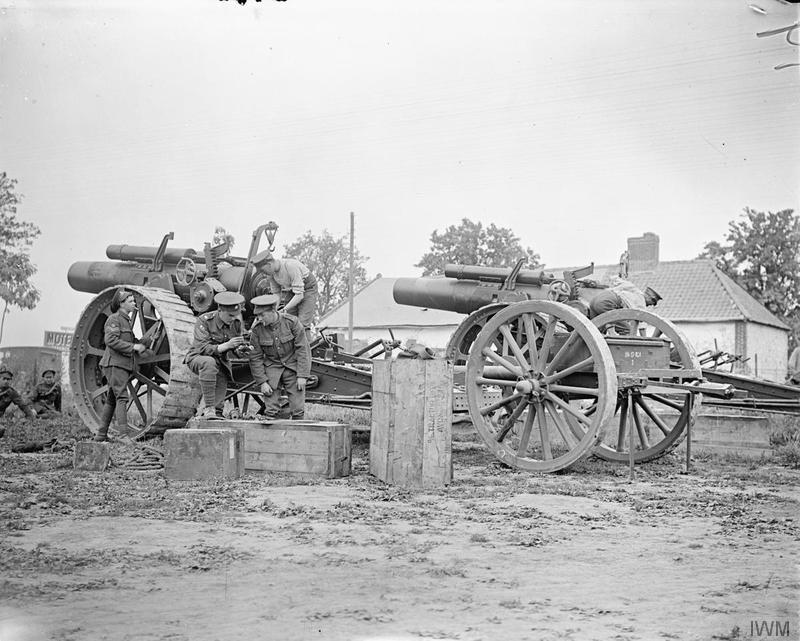
Artificers of 135th Siege Bty overhauling 8-inch howitzers at La Houssoye, 25 August 1916.

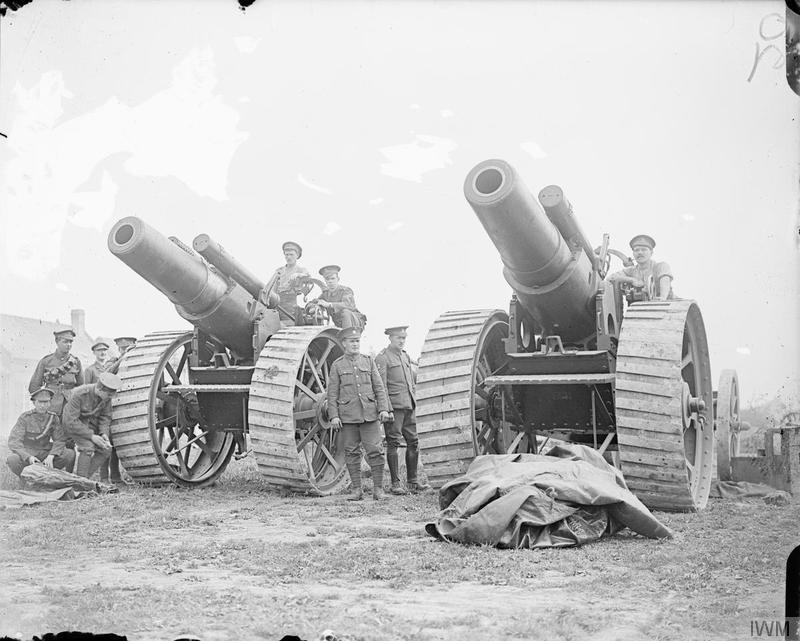
135th Siege Bty at La Houssoye, 25 August 1916.

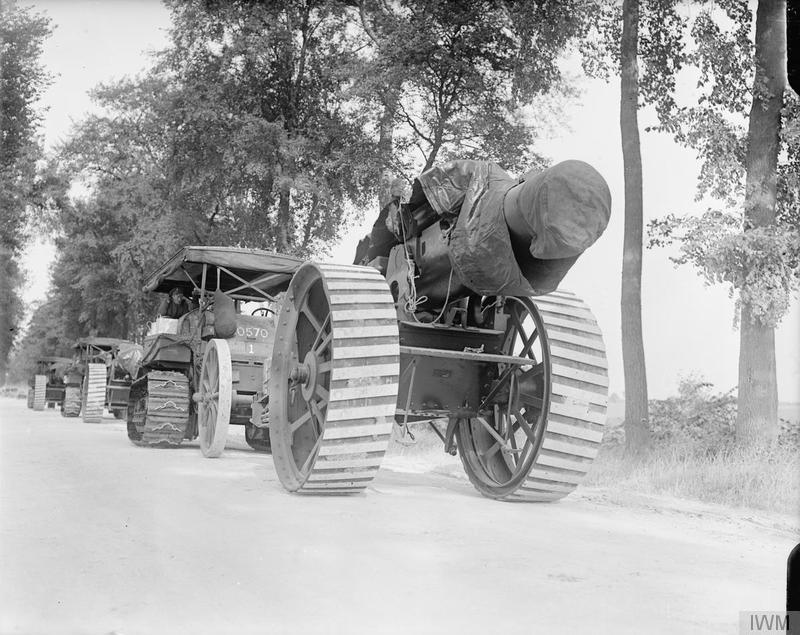
8-inch Mk V howitzers of 135th Siege Bty being towed along the Amiens–Albert road by Holt 75 caterpillar tractors.

135th Siege Bty went out to Western Front in the summer of 1916, the advance party leaving on 11 August, and on 13 August the guns and the motor transport column of the Army Service Corps (ASC) – four Holt 75 caterpillar tractors, over 30 lorries, plus a car and assorted motorcycles – went to Avonmouth Docks to be shipped to France. The rest of the personnel embarked on the Golden Eagle at Folkestone Harbour on 19 August. After unloading the guns at Boulogne the battery entrained and joined the advance party at La Houssoye on 23 August, where it joined III Corps' Heavy Artillery on 23 August.

=== Somme ===
While at La Houssoye the battery was visited by the official war photographer John Warwick Brooke, several of whose pictures of the battery are in the collection of the Imperial War Museum. On 29 August 135th Siege Bty was assigned to 27th Heavy Artillery Group (HAG). At that stage of the war a heavy artillery group (HAG) was a lieutenant-colonel's command controlling a fluctuating number of RGA heavy and siege batteries. The battery was temporarily split up and attached to experienced batteries for initiation into front-line service. Left Half Battery was attached to 19th Siege Bty (of 27th HAG) outside Mametz, Right Half Battery to 57th Siege Bty (of 30th HAG) with No 1 gun near Contalmaison with the forward section, and No 2 gun at Fricourt with the rear section. These batteries were supporting Fourth Army conducting the Somme Offensive; although the gun positions were rarely under fire, the forward observation officers (FOOs) and signallers were in Observation Posts (OPs) in the midst of fighting in High Wood and Delville Wood. After a month the battery was pulled out on 21 September, but immediately sent forward to new positions, with Right Half to 67th Siege Bty and Left Half to 47th Siege Bty, both close to Montauban in XV Corps' Heavy Artillery. From these positions the battery supported the attacks of September that cleared High Wood and Delville Wood, and captured Flers, Guillemont and Ginchy, and then Gueudecourt.

135th Siege Bty had been subordinated to 14th HAG since 12 September, and on 29 September the sections began moving forward to prepare four new positions on the Longueval–High Wood road and reunite the battery. The gunners worked in mud and rain, and had to carry their ammunition down the last 500 yards (460 m) along the shell-damaged road. Eventually the exhausted gunners were helped by fatigue parties from the British West Indies Regiment. The gunners were accommodated in old German dugouts that were collapsing under shellfire and rain. The OPs, however, were 3,000 yards (2,700 m) behind the front line, only just in front of the battery. The battery's targets were usually over the Ligny-Thilloy sector and round the Butte de Warlencourt. It suffered its first few fatal casualties in early October. Fourth Army's offensive was now completely held up, and XV Corps was relieved by I ANZAC Corps, taking over the batteries in position. 135th Siege Bty was transferred to the command of 3rd HAG on 16 October. 3rd HAG's primary target was the troublesome 'Gird Trench' nd associated strongpoints, which had withstood many attacks in the Battle of the Transloy Ridges. The shelling of the German positions continued, with 135th Siege Bty putting down a particularly heavy bombardment on 13 November to support Fifth Army's attack further north (the Battle of the Ancre).

=== Winter 1916–17 ===
The Somme Offensive died down after the Ancre and 135th Siege Bty pulled its guns out on the night of 1/2 December. It exchanged with ASC ammunition column with 67th Siege Bty and then moved to Bonnay for rest. The BEF was taking over part of the line from the French, so 135th Siege Bty moved south to rejoin XV Corps in this new sector, transferring to 6th HAG on 11 December. Its new gun positions were in the valley below 'Saverake Wood;, SW of Combles, at least half a mile from any road, so the only way to get the guns in was to dismantle them at the railhead and send the pieces up on small light railway trucks. The battery had to construct a railway siding connecting to the Decauville Railway while the gunners lived in camouflaged tents in the snow, until some experienced miners in their ranks constructed deep dugouts in the underlying chalk. The first gun was registered on 21 December and all four were in position and ready for action on 25 December. Major Sladen was invalided to England on 18 December and was succeeded on 17 January 1917 by Acting-Maj C.P. Heath from 66th Siege Bty.

The battery's miners also constructed camouflaged OPs for the brigade, despite alternate frosts and thaws. From February the battery was engaged in shelling the enemy's 'Jupiter' trenches along the edge of St Pierre Vaast Wood, for which the OP was in the infantry's lines, at the end of a 800 yards (730 m) telephone line that frequently had to be repaired after being cut by enemy shellfire. The battery's bombardments continued daily until 4 March, when 8th Division of XV Corps carried out a surprise local attack on Bouchavesnes. The battery pushed its OPs forwards and attempted to shell a group of German batteries that were now in sight. Unfortunately, they were beyond the limited range of the Mk V 8-inch howitzers. On 13 March the battery was ordered to pull out, and on 16 March it was officially transferred to 32nd HAG.

=== Arras ===
32nd HAG was with VI Corps in the Arras sector under Third Army, and the battery joined it on 21 March. Third Army was preparing for the forthcoming Arras Offensive, in which 135th Siege Bty's role was counter-battery (CB) fire. Positions had been selected for it in private gardens off the Place Vauban in the middle of Arras, only 2,800 yards (2,600 m) behind the front line. The flowerbeds had to be carefully protected as the guns were pulled in, because any changes would have been obvious to German air observers. The battery remained silent for several days while 3600 rounds of ammunition were stockpiled. The artillery plan for Arras was much more carefully worked out than previous operations. It began with systematic CB work to put the German artillery out of action, 135th Siege Bty's targets, beginning on 1 April being mainly in 'Battery Valley' (east and north-east of Tilloy ), in the valley of the River Scarpe, and behind 'Orange Hill'. Occasionally the battery also bombarded the villages of Feuchy, Fampoux and Athies. The main bombardment was planned to last for five days (V, W, X, Y and Z) beginning on 4 April. given the mass of guns firing, the area bombarded was divided into small zones without overlapping fire, to help the FOOs spot the fall of shot of their own guns. However, visibility was poor on some of the days, so an additional day (Q) was inserted on 7 April and Z day for the attack (the First Battle of the Scarpe) became 9 April. 135th Siege Bty was badly shelled in the Place Vauban on V day, with the Battery Quartermaster-Sergeant mortally wounded and the Battery Sergeant-Major wounded and evacuated. On Z day 135th Siege Bty was manning the brigade OP, with the FOOs and signallers tasked with following the attacking infantry as closely as possible, jumping off from the same tunnels under Arras and laying out a telephone line as they advanced. The enemy's SOS barrage came down too late, and slackened off as their batteries were captured, the infantry sweeping forward against scattered resistance. VI Corps had captured Orange Hill and the Wancourt–Feuchy lines by the end of the day, an advance of 5,000 yards (4,600 m).

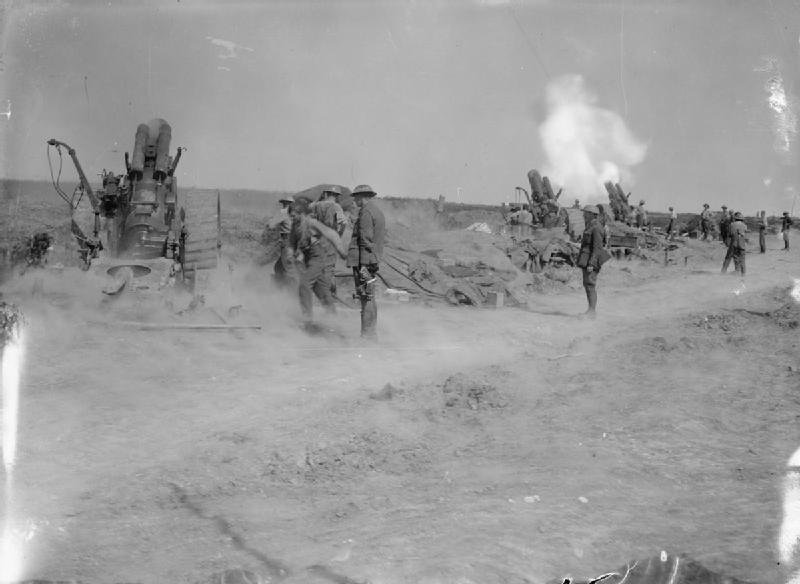
8-inch Mk V howitzers of 135th Siege Bty in action near Hénin-sur-Cojeul, 27 May 1917.

Although VI Corps' attack on 9 April had been successful, the follow-up over succeeding days was less so, the guns having to be pushed forward through mud and destruction to bring the enemy into effective range. On 11 April the loaded guns of 135th Siege Bty were ordered to cease fire until midnight, when they were fired off into Guémappe, which they could just reach. Next day 135th Siege Bty began moving forward to Feuchy Chapel, but the traffic congestion was so bad that the leading section could not pull its guns into position until after daybreak on 13 April, when it came under considerable enemy shelling. The two guns were in position by 13.30 and registered by 15.00; the other two came up during the day and were ready for action by 18.30. Large numbers of guns were crammed together in the open in a small area, under incessant harassing fire (HF) by enemy field guns and repeated CB bombardments by heavy guns. Apart from a few captured dugouts the gunners had to shelter from weather and shellfire in nearby trenches when not serving the guns. Keeping lines open to the OP on Orange Hill and later in Monchy-le-Preux was difficult, as was bringing up ammunition lorries under shellfire. A particularly destructive CB shoot ranged by aircraft hit the battery on 21 April, when ammunition dumps, camouflage and nearby supply tanks were destroyed. When the gunners emerged from shelter only one gun was completely knocked out, and another was soon repaired, giving the battery three guns to begin next morning's bombardment for the Second Battle of the Scarpe. However, the later bombardments were rushed and less effective than the opening of the offensive. During April 1917 135th Siege Bty fired more rounds than any similar period of its history. A fresh bombardment began on 1 May for the Third Battle of the Scarpe two days later, but the attack was largely unsuccessful.

After a period of rest the gunners returned to their guns at Feuchy Chapel on 15 May, but pulled them out next day when 135th Siege Bty was transferred to 48th HAG with VII Corps for the final attacks on the Hindenburg Line. It took up positions near Tilloy and began registering new targets. It then carried out CB shoots nearly every day with air observation while improving its positions, the miners digging new dugouts including an underground battery command post and telephone exchange.

=== Nieuport ===
The BEF's next planned operation was the Flanders Offensive, aiming to break through at Ypres, with a follow-up attack by Fourth Army along the coast supported by amphibious landings (Operation Hush). On 1 July 1917 the battery was ordered to Oostduinkerke to rejoin XV Corps with Fourth Army. It travelled by train and arrived on 7 July, being assigned to 34th HAG. The gun pits were dug into the sand dunes, and the guns had to be dragged in pieces over 1 mile (1.6 km) of sand, followed by the ammunition. The position being prepared was under shellfire, and on the night of 9/10 July this became severe, including large numbers of gas shells. This was the preparation for a spoiling attack by the Germans that captured the British front line trenches and pushed the infantry back over the canal. 135th Siege Bty pulled its guns in over the next two nights. 256th Tunnelling Company, Royal Engineers, helped the gunners to construct dugouts and galleries under the dunes. The OPs were at Nieuport, one being a concrete tower built into one of the houses. The guns of both sides were very active throughout the summer and the batteries round Oostduinkerke suffered a steady drain of casualties and damaged guns. On one occasion 135th Siege Bty came under accurate shelling while conducting a shoot with air observation; the observer found the enemy battery and called down fire from a 9.2-inch howitzer battery to silence it, returning to the task with 135th afterwards. After Operation Hush was abandoned, the battery came under the command of 36th HAG on 3 September and then of 1st HAG on 6 October but this did not alter its tasks.

=== Winter 1917–8 ===
On 5 December the battery was ordered back to the Arras sector to join 83rd HAG in XIII Corps with First Army. The battery moved by road, arriving on 12 December. It established a Forward Section of two guns at Bailleul-Sir-Berthoult ('M') on the forward slope of Vimy Ridge and the other two as the Rear Section at Maison de la Cote ('X2') on the Arras–Bailleul road, while also digging gun pits in a sunken road as an alternative position for two guns ('N').

On 24 December 1917 the battery was joined by a section of 258th Siege Bty, which joined Rear Section and brought 135th Siege Bty up to a six gun establishment. (Note: 258th Siege Bty was in the process of being reconstituted as a 6-inch howitzer Bty: its 8-inch howitzers and gunners experienced with them were distributed to 61st and 135th Siege Btys.) By now HAG allocations were becoming more fixed, and on 1 January 1918 they were converted into permanent RGA brigades. For the rest of the war the battery remained part of 83rd (Mixed) Bde, RGA, along with two heavy batteries (60-pounders), two 6-inch howitzer batteries and one of 9.2-inch howitzers.

Around two-thirds of the battery's personnel were sent for rest from 15 to 30 January 1918 while junior officers under training manned some of the guns. However, duties during the 'rest' period were still heavy, with two new Mk VI howitzers having to be dragged into an old German gun position ('S') near Bailleul (just 2,500 yards (2,300 m) from the current German front line) to begin replacing the worn-out Mk V guns. 83rd Brigade's role was CB work on XIII Corps' front, and with its excellent observation from Vimy Ridge 'S' and 'X2' positions (the latter shared with the 9.2-inch howitzers of 69th Siege Bty) were able to carry out some effective shoots against hostile batteries around Crest Wood. During February and March German retaliatory fire on Bailleul, was heavy, especially with Mustard gas shells, which caused numerous casualties.

The Germans were expected soon to launch a Spring Offensive, so all gun positions were well stocked with ammunition and equipped with gas-proof dugouts and buried telephone cables. The positions were prepared for defence with rifles and machine guns, and means to destroy the guns if overrun. A detachment of the Middlesex Regiment was attached to protect the battery. On 5 March six new Mk VII howitzers arrived to re-equip the battery at 'S' and 'X2' positions.

=== Spring Offensive ===
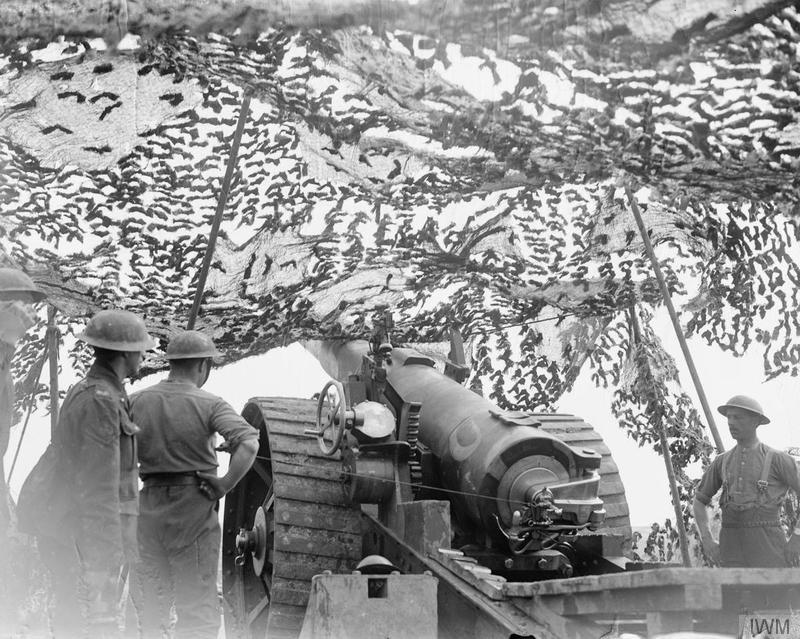
8-inch howitzer about to fire, near Arras, 2 April 1918.

The German Spring Offensive was launched on 21 March. Although the battery came under shellfire, particularly round 'X2', the Arras front remained quiet. Next day the batteries were ordered to get their guns onto emergency platforms, which allowed greater fields of fire. When the German attack extended to the Scarpe on 23 March, 135th Siege Bty was able to assist the defenders. It also pulled two guns out of the exposed S position and moved them to prepared gun pits on the reverse slope of Vimy Ridge. The battery carried out some effective CB work on the German batteries that were being moved up in front.

On 28 March the German extended their offensive north to First Army's front (the Third Battle of Arras), beginning with a massive bombardment at 03.00. The batteries of 83rd Bde were supporting 56th (1st London) Division, but the attack initially came in on the adjacent XVII Corps. The batteries opened fire on prearranged 'SOS' targets for XVII Corps at 04.00 but remained under fire themselves until 12.00. Many guns were temporarily put out of action when they were buried by debris from shell explosions, particularly at 'X2'. 135th Siege Bty received the heaviest fire in the brigade and Major Heath pulled his men back from the gun pits until he was ordered to continue fighting his guns regardless of casualties. The battery was finally ordered to pull back that night to Écurie station; one gun with a damaged wheel had to be left at X2 until it could be recovered later, but the rest of the battery got away and resumed fire next day from primitive platforms. However, the infantry battle had dwindled away by nightfall on 28 March. Although 56th (1st L) Division had been forced out of its forward zone, there was no breakthrough, Vimy Ridge had been held and German losses were severe.

On 1 April 135th Siege Bty's five guns were in action from Springfield Camp on the Arras–Lens road, establishing a new forward position (the Plank Road position) on the Roclincourt–Thélus road on 11 April. The battery also recovered gun platforms and ammunition that had been abandoned at the old S position. From these new positions (as yet undiscovered by the enemy) they resumed HF shoots against the Germans in support of 4th Canadian Division, which had taken over the line. The work included nightly 'corps salvoes' and concentrations against enemy trenches, dispersing working parties, occasional CB shoots with the flash spotters and sound rangers, and regular aeroplane shoots during daytime, as well as the battery's own OP on Vimy Ridge. It was not until 12 May that the Germans spotted the Plank Road position and subjected it to occasional HF shelling that inflicted a few casualties. It came under heavy fire while conducting a morning aeroplane shoot on 22 May, and one gun was damaged. On 28 May the section moved to a new camouflaged position that had been prepared some 800 yards (730 m) away in Roclincourt village. In June the battery was reinforced by an officer and 48 gunners of the Portuguese Expeditionary Corps to gain experience with heavy artillery. 83rd Brigade was withdrawn into GHQ Reserve on 19 July, and 135th and 69th Siege Btys temporarily joined 67th Bde, moving to new positions at Souchez. They pulled out again on the night of 30/31 July and entrained to rejoin 83rd Bde, which was reassembling at Gentelles Wood, near Amiens.

=== Hundred Days Offensive ===
83rd Brigade was once again supporting Canadian Corps, now under Fourth Army. The gunners found it difficult to move the heavy platforms through the wood into their designated positions, a wooded ravine about 400 yards (370 m) from the road, which was under shellfire. There was not time to dig gun pits before daylight so they were camouflaged and the men withdrawn to billets in Boves. It took several more nights' work to get the guns and ammunition into position and hidden. This was completed just in time to participate in the Battle of Amiens on 8 August. The heavy batteries remained hidden and silent until Zero hour, so no registration could be carried out, relying instead on the Field Survey Section to lay the guns accurately on their targets. The attack went in at 04.20 and 135th Siege Bty's task was to neutralise six enemy batteries, with one howitzer firing at each target, and later to take part in concentrations on likely enemy assembly points. The advance by infantry and tanks was rapid, and the German artillery withdrew rather than replying to the overwhelming fire. By 09.20 the enemy had been driven back out of range of the battery's howitzers. 83rd Brigade then ordered the battery to send forward a party to man some of the captured German guns. The volunteers from 135th Siege Bty under Lt O.L. Gill took over a 100 cm gun (Note: Possibly a 10 cm K 17.) and continued rapid fire at the retreating Germans until nightfall. This was also out of range by next morning but the battery commander managed to obtain two lorries and the captured gun advanced with the lighter (60-pdr and 6-inch) guns of the brigade. By 16 August Capt C.E.L. Phillips of 135th Siege Bty was commanding a battery of captured 5.9-inch howitzers (Note: Probably 15 cm sFH 13s.) and Lt Gill had a full battery of 10 cm guns, all manned by gunners drawn from all the batteries of 83rd Bde. Meanwhile, the brigade had left behind the slow-moving 8- and 9.2-inch howitzers of 135th and 69th Siege Btys, and it was not until the night of 12/13 August that 135th moved up to Le Quesnel. Next morning the gunners began emplacing the platforms, but the work had to be redone twice due to changes in orders. The main body of the battery therefore played little part in the Canadians' follow-up attack on 15 August.

During the Battle of Albert (23 August) 83rd Bde's batteries fired in support of the French XXXI Corps, which had relieved the Canadians but made little progress. The French finally captured Fresnoy-lès-Roye on 26 August and 83rd Bde advanced, leaving 135th and 69th Siege Btys behind once more. An advance party of 135th joined the rest of the brigade near Nesle on 30 August, ready to begin preparing new positions and the guns were ordered up that evening; they were in action at Herly by 12.00 next day. Although the OP came under some fire and the gun lines were bombed by aircraft nightly, 83rd Bde noted that hostile shelling was well below normal levels, and as the enemy pulled back out of range its batteries were placed in GHQ Reserve at Renancourt near Amiens on 5 September to undergo training.

83rd Brigade rejoined Fourth Army on 14 September and that night the caterpillar tractors began dragging the heavy guns up via Villers-Brettoneux to Attilly to support the next phase of the Hundred Days Offensive. By 18 September the guns were in position, ammunition had been brought up to forward dumps and the battery fired in support of the surprise attack of the Battle of Épehy that morning. 83rd Brigade was supporting 6th Division on the Army's extreme right, adjacent to the French. Although the assault was generally successful, 6th Division was held up at Holnon, 'the Quadrilateral' and Fresnoy-le-Petit, but the artillery crushed a German counter-attack. The battery then fired on SOS lines during the night in support of the infantry, suffering a number of casualties itself. 6th Division captured Holnon and Fresnoy next day. On 20 September the Germans began a destructive CB shoot against the battery, ranged by an aircraft, but caused no casualties or damage to guns, although some ammunition was destroyed. On the night of 21/22 September the whole brigade area came under heavy shellfire of various calibres, including some gas shelling. One gun received a direct hit and considerable amounts of ammunition were destroyed, and several gunners were wounded or gassed. After that, 83rd Bde arranged to have all its unengaged guns laid on five known enemy batteries, to fire retaliatory CB tasks whenever the Germans fired.

Before 135th Siege Bty left the dangerous positions at Attilly, its five remaining guns supported a limited attack on the Quadrilateral on 24 September, a preliminary operation allowing Fourth Army to close up to the Hindenburg Line. The battery then repositioned on the night of 25/26 September to support IX Corps' planned attack on the St Quentin Canal. From well-dispersed gun positions west of St Quentin Wood untroubled by German artillery but subjected to night bombing, the battery participated in two days' bombardment of enemy trenches and machine gun positions. The infantry assault went in on 29 September. 46th (North Midland) Division, which had to storm the canal itself, had the heaviest level of artillery support of any British division in the war and its assault was a smashing success. 135th and 69th Siege Btys' role was to breach the canal embankment from Bellenglise to the canal bend in an attempt to drain the water. 46th (NM) Division swarmed over the canal across captured bridges and dams, using lifebelts and planks, and took its final objectives before nightfall. The battery's five howitzers had fired 2107 rounds (approximately 200 tonnes) of ammunition in just over 62 hours, while suffering no casualties itself. Next day 83rd Bde fired on Thorigny (near Lehaucourt) supporting 1st Division's successful follow-up attack.

83rd Brigade now began moving its lighter guns forward across the canal to support 46th (NM) Division in the pursuit, leaving behind the 8- and 9.2-inch howitzers of 135th and 69th Siege Btys under the temporary command of 14th Bde. On the night of 3/4 October three caterpillar tractors were made available to move half of the battery 10 miles (16 km) to Magny-la-Fosse, where it was ready for action by 08.00. The remaining guns came up next night. However, early on 6 October 135th Siege Bty was badly bombed, suffering a number of casualties and damage to equipment. On 8 October IX Corps attacked Mericourt as part of the Second Battle of Cambrai, and 135th Siege Bty supported this with CB fire from four howitzers, one being unserviceable. By 08.00 the Germans had retreated and the battery was almost out of range. Next the battery was ordered up to Bohain to prepare for Fourth Army's next setpiece operation, the Battle of the Selle. Launched at 05.20 on 17 October the attack quickly achieved an advance of 4,000 yards (3,700 m) and after firing on enemy batteries 135th Siege Bty found itself out of range soon after 11.20. The Germans retired across the Sambre–Oise Canal and destroyed the bridges behind them.

Once again 135th and 69th Siege Btys had to be left behind as the lighter guns followed the pursuit. 135th Siege Bty spent the period 18–28 October out of action at Bohain, untroubled apart from an occasional long-range shell. After preparing fresh positions at Écaillon, the battery moved its platforms up on 31 October, despite problems on the crowded and slippery roads, and the first four guns arrived in the evening. That night the new position was heavily shelled and the battery suffered a number of casualties while emplacing its guns. After registering the guns, the whole of 83rd Bde supported 1st Division's successful attack across the Sambre–Oise Canal on 4 November. Zero was at 05.45, and each of 135th's five howitzers was laid on a different hostile battery. As the attack progressed, it responded to calls from observation aircraft. The 12 rounds fired in response to one such call at 15.12 were the last fired by the battery. The infantry had established bridgeheads over the canal and advanced 3,000 yards (2,700 m) beyond. Next day the German artillery could be seen pulling out and retreating. Left behind once more, the battery was quartered at Wassigny when the Armistice with Germany came into force on 11 November.

== Disbandment ==
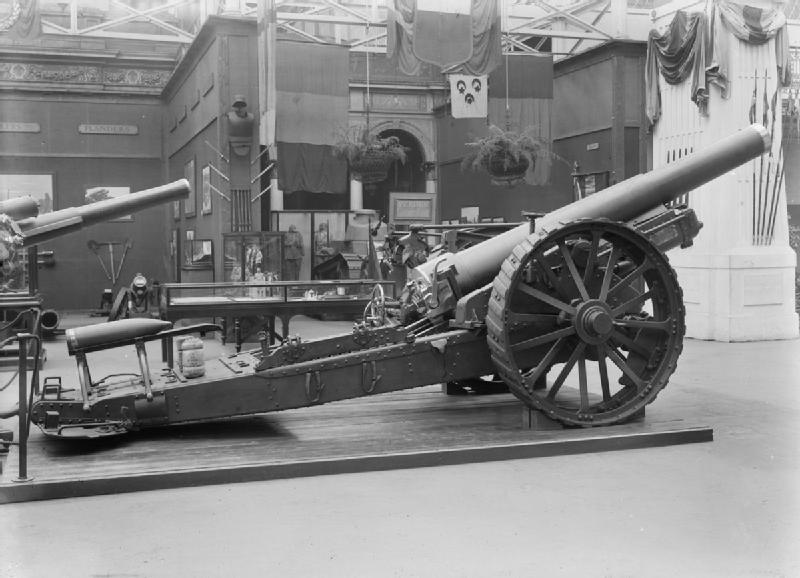
135th Siege Bty's 8-inch howitzer displayed at the Crystal Palace, 1923.

After the Armistice 83rd Bde was selected to form part of the British Army of Occupation in Germany, but 8-inch howitzers were not to be taken, so 135th Siege Bty was left behind once more. It moved on 11 December from Wassigny to Fontaine-au-Pire where it remained through the winter. In March 1919 it supplied a large draft to 25th and 70th Siege Btys in British Army of the Rhine and demobilisation proceeded for the rest until only a cadre remained. In the interim order of battle for the postwar Regular Army produced in May 1919, the cadre of 135th Siege Battery was to form the basis of 142nd Battery in XXXVI Brigade, RGA, but these plans were abandoned after the Treaty of Versailles was signed in June. By 26 June the cadre of about 30 men left for disbandment in England leaving the officer commanding and an equipment guard to entrain the guns and then embark them from Dunkirk on 6 August. One of the battery's 8-inch Mk VII howitzers was put on display at The Crystal Palace in an exhibition that formed the basis of the Imperial War Museum.

During its service the battery lost 29 men killed or died of wounds and had 108 wounded and 70 gassed (almost all the latter in March 1918). Commonwealth War Grave Commission records include three other men of the battery who died in service, two of them after the Armistice.
