= 69th Siege Battery, Royal Garrison Artillery =

69th Siege Battery, RGA
- Cap Badge of the Royal Regiment of Artillery
- Active: 9 October 1915–26 October 1919
- Country: United Kingdom
- Branch: British Army
- Role: Siege Artillery
- Part of: Royal Garrison Artillery
- Garrison/HQ: Brighton
- Equipment: BL 9.2-inch howitzer
- Engagements: Battle of the Somme; Battle of Arras; Battle of Messines; German spring offensive Hundred Days Offensive

Insignia
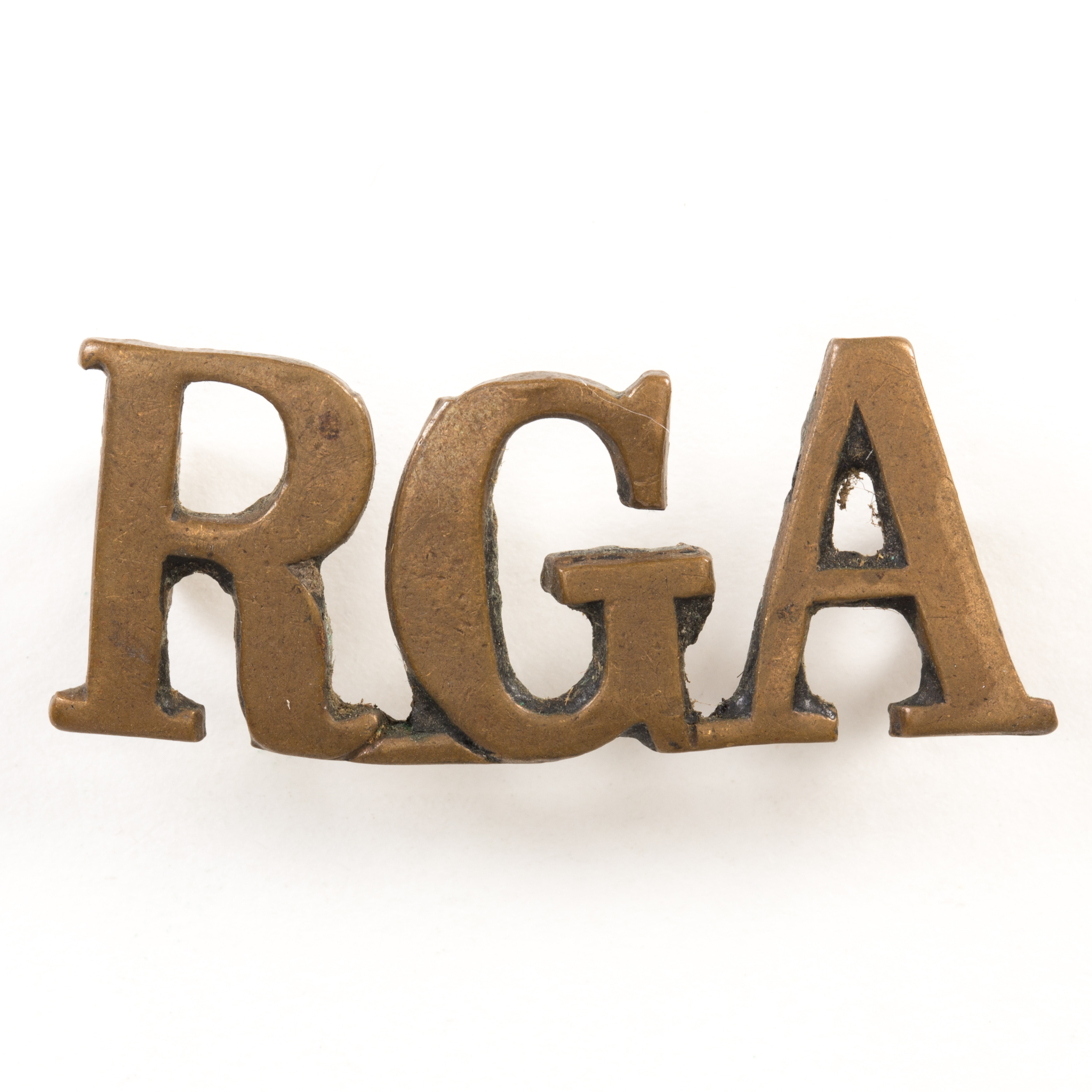
- Shoulder title

The 69th Siege Battery was a heavy howitzer unit of the British Royal Garrison Artillery (RGA), formed in Sussex during World War I. The battery saw active service on the Western Front, participating in key battles such as the Battle of the Somme, the Battle of Arras, and the Battle of Messines.

In addition to its role in these major offensives, the 69th Siege Battery also fought during the German Spring Offensive and contributed to the final Allied push during the Hundred Days Offensive, which ultimately led to the end of the war.

== Mobilisation ==
On the outbreak of war in August 1914, units of the part-time Territorial Force (TF) were invited to volunteer for Overseas Service and the majority of the Sussex Royal Garrison Artillery did so. This unit had mobilised as part of No. 10 Coastal Fire Command, responsible for the defence of Newhaven. By October 1914, the campaign on the Western Front was bogging down into trench warfare, and there was an urgent need for siege artillery batteries in France. The War Office decided that the TF coastal gunners were well-trained enough to take over many of the duties in the coastal defences, releasing Regular RGA gunners for service in the field. Soon the TF RGA companies that had volunteered for overseas service were also supplying trained gunners to RGA units serving overseas and providing cadres to form complete new units.

A company from the Sussex RGA provided half the personnel for the 69th Siege Battery, RGA when it was formed on 9 October 1915, the remainder being 'Kitchener's Army' volunteers. Together with the 68th Siege Battery, it constituted C Siege Brigade (Training) until that was dissolved in January 1916. The two batteries then joined the 70th Siege Battery in C Siege Brigade (Training) at Lydd Camp. At Lydd, the men were introduced to modern heavy guns but did gun drills on 9.45-inch Skoda howitzers from the Second Boer War and their actual field firing with 8-inch rifled muzzle-loading howitzers from 1879. Other units under training at Lydd at this time included the 67th and 76th Siege Batteries, as well as five South African Heavy Artillery batteries (71st, 72nd, 73rd, 74th, 75th).

On 19 February 1916, the Army Service Corps formed 652 Company as Battery Ammunition Column Motor Transport for 68th and 69th Siege Batteries. The battery mobilised at Taunton on 28 February under the command of Major H.G. Carr, with Major A.J. Martineau of the Sussex RGA as second-in-command. Throughout March, it received four 9.2-inch howitzers and was joined by the 652 Company. On 29 March, it dispatched its guns and transport by road to Avonmouth Docks, where they were loaded aboard HM Transport Aragon, and on 31 March, the men were transported by train to Southampton. There they embarked on the SS Lydia, together with the 76th Siege Battery with whom they had trained at Lydd, and arrived at Boulogne on 1 April.

== Western Front ==
The guns had been unloaded and overhauled by 16 April. The next day, the battery left for the front by lorry, with the guns following by train and arriving at La Houssoye on 19 April. The battery joined the 27th Heavy Artillery Group (HAG) supporting III Corps in the Fourth Army. Shortly afterwards, 652 Company ASC was absorbed into the group's ammunition column. The gunners spent a week digging positions; two guns were ready for action by 27 April, with all four ready by 29 April. They spent another 10 days preparing dugouts before firing their first rounds on 10 May, to begin registering their guns on targets. They then carried out a few counter-battery (CB) shoots. On 19 May, the battery came under the command of 30th HAG, a newly-arrived headquarters.

=== Somme ===
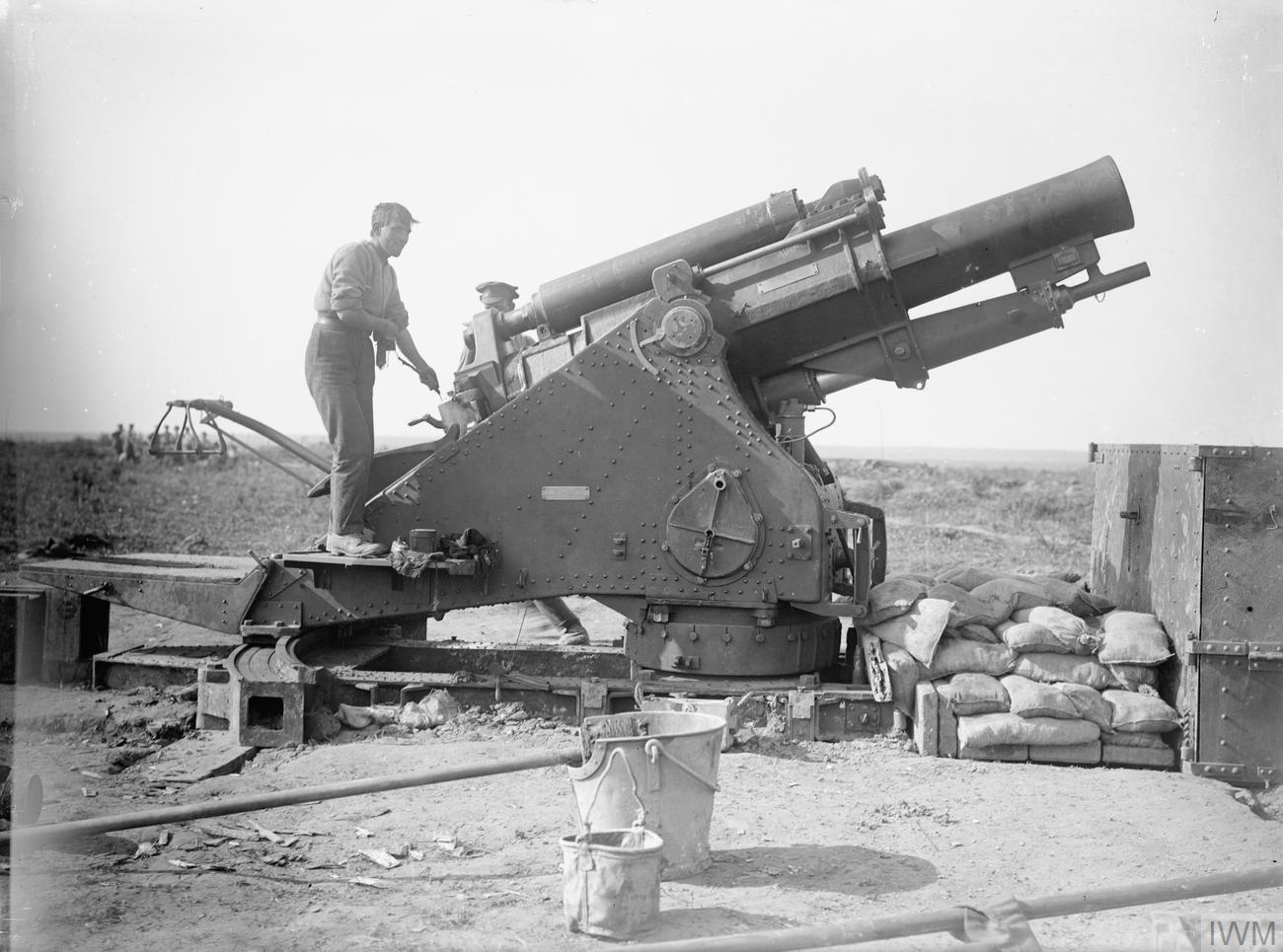
9.2-inch howitzer in action on the Somme, 1916.

The Fourth Army was preparing for that year's 'Big Push', the Battle of the Somme, with III Corps facing the German redoubts in front of Ovillers. The bombardment was to extend over five days-U, V, W, X, and Y-before the assault was launched on Z day. The strenuous work of firing the heavy guns and howitzers was divided into two-hour periods to allow the gunners to rest, Forward Observation Officers (FOOs) to be relieved, and the guns to cool. The bombardment began on 24 June, and for the 69th Siege Battery, it reached a crescendo of 444 rounds on X day (27 June), on which a premature shell burst killed two and wounded six gunners in the battery. However, on several days, the weather was too bad for good air or ground observation, and the programme was extended by two days (Y1 and Y2). The infantry commanders were still dissatisfied with the effects on Ovillers (many shells failed to burst) and brought up trench mortars to supplement the heavies. The final bombardment began at 06:25 on Z Day (1 July). When the infantry launched their assault at 07:30, III Corps had its heavy guns lengthen their range in a series of timed 'lifts' ahead of them. However, the bombardment had failed to knock out many of the machine gun positions, and as soon as the attackers went 'over the top', they began to take heavy casualties. The 8th Division, attacking up the Ovillers spur, gained only a few footholds in the opposing lines, and it was impossible to renew the attack in the afternoon.

The bombardment resumed the next day, with the 69th Siege Battery having to replace the beams on which its howitzers rested because they were splitting. Fire continued over the following days on targets in Contalmaison, Pozières, and Courcelette as the offensive continued, with the battery moving forward by sections to shorten the range. On 31 July, it suffered several casualties from enemy fire, and the Right Section withdrew to a safer position. The battery shelled Martinpuich and High Wood intermittently until mid-September in support of the continuing attacks. It then moved up to Contalmaison to bombard Eaucourt L'Abbaye and the Butte de Warlencourt. The battery participated in a heavy bombardment of the Gallwitz Line on 5 November, followed by some 'Chinese' (fake) attacks before the Somme offensive died out in mid-November. It supported the continuing Operations on the Ancre, January–March 1917. On 30 January 1917, Major Carr was promoted to command the 29th HAG and was replaced by Captain J.C. Lucas. On 28 January, the battery began preparing new positions at Frise, and the guns began registration fire from 5 February. Targets over the following weeks included trenches, dugouts, and bridges.

=== Arras ===
On 12 March, the guns were hauled out and moved north to join the 50th HAG under the Third Army in the Arras sector, with the first half battery arriving on 20 March. For the opening of the Battle of Arras on 9 April, the battery was deployed at Marœuil in support of XVII Corps. Before and during the attack, the 69th Siege Battery carried out counter-battery (CB) tasks and fired on selected roads. XVII Corps attacked with three divisions and was largely successful, except for a hold-up on one flank. Large numbers of prisoners were taken in the German front line, demoralised by the bombardment. After the battle, the battery prepared to dismount its guns, but several of the road wheels were destroyed by shellfire. The 76th Siege Battery loaned some wheels so that the battery could complete the move. It went to Écurie, north of Arras, and switched to the command of the 70th HAG for the subsequent stages of the Arras offensive, including the attacks on Oppy Wood.

=== Messines ===
The battery next moved to Neuve Eglise to join the 16th HAG with the Second Army as part of the artillery build-up for the forthcoming Battle of Messines. Once the battery had prepared its positions, it opened fire on Messines village on 29 May. The bombardment continued against enemy trenches until the assault went in on 7 June, following the explosion of huge mines. During the day, the battery fired 1,386 rounds between 03:00 and 23:00. The results of the limited attack were spectacular. The British artillery was repositioned after the battle, with the 69th Siege Battery moving up to La Petite Douve Farm in the old German front line.

=== Nieuport ===
On 17 June, the battery was pulled out of the line, leaving its guns in position and taking over those of the 118th Siege Battery. The gunners rested and overhauled these guns until 3 July, when they moved to Oostduinkerke on the Belgian coast to join the 22nd HAG with the Fourth Army. The BEF's next operation was the Flanders Offensive, aiming to break through at Ypres with a follow-up attack along the coast supported by amphibious landings (Operation Hush), for which the Fourth Army had assembled around Nieuport. The guns began registering on targets on 9 July; the next day, British preparations were disrupted by a German spoiling attack. Over the following weeks, the British batteries exchanged counter-battery (CB) fire with their German counterparts, with aircraft spotting for the guns. On 22 July, the 69th Siege Battery had a gun temporarily put out of action by a concentration of 11-inch shells, and the next day, had one gun totally destroyed. This continued, with occasional spells at rest camps, until 15 November, when the battery was pulled out.

Major Cyril Scholefield took over command of the battery on 31 August. He was a Regular officer who had been commissioned into the RGA just before the outbreak of war. Despite the static warfare, the battery's chain of command was frequently changed: to the 45th HAG on 3 September, to the 36th HAG on 6 October while in rest camp, and then to the 15th HAG with XIX Corps Heavy Artillery under the Belgian Army (after the Fourth Army HQ left) from 9 October to 26 November 1917.

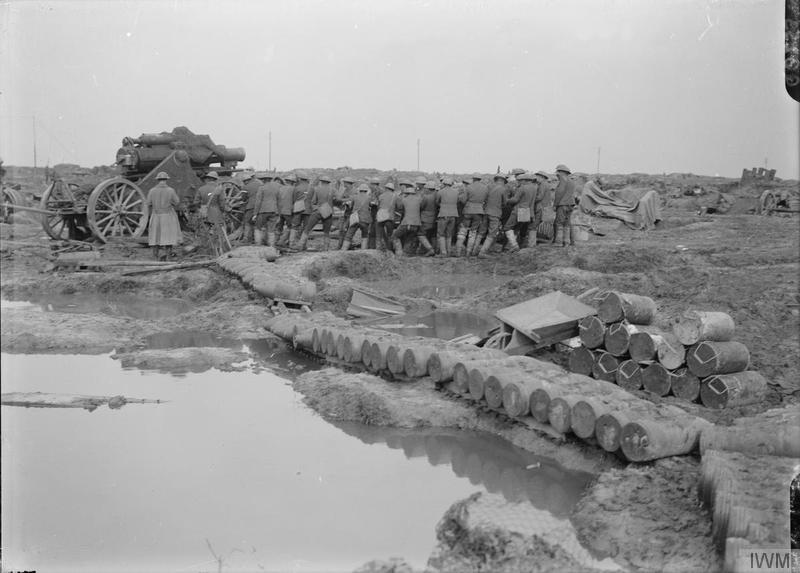
Positioning a 9.2-inch howitzer and its ammunition in the mud of the Western Front, 1917.

=== Winter 1917–18 ===
On 25 November 1917, the 69th Siege Battery returned to Marœuil, joining the 83rd HAG under the First Army. The guns shared a position at Maison de la Côte ('X2') on the Arras–Bailleul road with a section of 8-inch howitzers from the 135th Siege Battery. By then, HAG allocations were becoming more fixed, and on 1 January 1918, they were converted into permanent RGA brigades. For the rest of the war, the battery was part of the 83rd (Mixed) Brigade, RGA, along with one or two heavy batteries (60-pounders), two 6-inch howitzer batteries, and one battery of 8-inch howitzers. The 83rd Brigade's role was counter-battery (CB) work on XIII Corps' front, and with its excellent observation from Vimy Ridge, its batteries were able to carry out some effective shoots against hostile batteries around Crest Wood. During February and March, German retaliatory fire on Bailleul was heavy, especially with mustard gas shells, which caused numerous casualties. The 69th Siege Battery was rearmed with 9.2-inch Mark II howitzers and made up to a strength of six guns when a section from the 504th Siege Battery arrived from England and joined on 16 March 1918.

=== Spring Offensive ===
The German Spring Offensive was launched on 21 March. On 28 March, it extended north to the First Army's front (the Third Battle of Arras), beginning with a massive bombardment at 03:00. The batteries of the 83rd Brigade were supporting the 56th (1st London) Division, but the attack initially came in on the adjacent XVII Corps. The 69th Siege Battery had recently shifted its guns across the Bailleul road, and the German counter-battery (CB) fire hit their old positions. Nevertheless, the battery was subjected to a barrage of high explosive (HE) and gas shells that passed across its positions at 03:15. The batteries opened fire on prearranged 'SOS' targets for XVII Corps at 04:00 but remained under fire themselves until 12:00. Many guns were temporarily put out of action when they were buried by debris from shell explosions. The 69th Siege Battery suffered heavy casualties, with Major Scholefield killed and the battery captain severely wounded, along with another officer. Three other ranks (ORs) were reported killed and 20 wounded. Scholefield was 22 years old when he was killed, and he was buried with five other members of the battery at Roclincourt Commonwealth War Graves Commission Cemetery. Although the 56th (1st London) Division was forced out of its forward zone, there was no breakthrough, and German losses were severe. The battle dwindled away and was over by nightfall.

Major Dudley Hire (later Brigadier, RA, of Middle East Command during World War II) took over as Officer Commanding the 69th Siege Battery, and in April and May, the guns resumed harassing fire against the Germans in support of the 4th Canadian Division, which had taken over the line. The work included nightly 'corps salvos' and concentrations against enemy trenches, dispersing working parties, occasional CB shoots with the flash spotters, and regular aeroplane shoots during the daytime.

=== Hundred Days Offensive ===
The guns resumed harassing fire (HF) against the Germans in support of the Canadian Corps, which had taken over the line, and continued through the spring and early summer until the 83rd Brigade was withdrawn into GHQ Reserve on 19 July. At that point, the 69th Siege Battery was temporarily detached to the 16th Brigade, RGA, with VIII Corps. On 1 August, the 83rd Brigade reassembled at Hesdin and entrained for Gentelles Wood in the Somme sector to rejoin the Canadian Corps, now under the Fourth Army. The heavy howitzers were positioned just in time to participate in the Battle of Amiens on 8 August. The attack began at 04:20, and by 10:15, the enemy had been driven back out of range of the heavy guns. The brigade was left behind, and it was not until 13 August that the 69th Siege Battery dragged its howitzers and ammunition up to Folies and began registering targets at Damery for the Canadians' follow-up attack on 15 August. It also manned a brigade of captured German heavy guns, which it fired in support of the attack. The Allied Hundred Days Offensive was now well underway.

During the Battle of Albert (23 August), the 83rd Brigade's batteries fired in support of the French XXXI Corps, which had relieved the Canadians but made little progress. The French finally captured Fresnoy-lès-Roye on 26 August, leaving the 69th and 135th Siege Batteries behind once more. The 69th Siege Battery finally joined the rest of the brigade near Nesle on 30 August. By early September, the 83rd Brigade noted that hostile shelling was well below normal levels, and as the enemy pulled back out of range, its batteries were placed in GHQ Reserve at Renancourt near Amiens and underwent training. The brigade rejoined the Fourth Army on 14 September, and the caterpillar tractors began dragging the heavy guns up via Villers-Brettoneux, while the 69th Siege Battery sent its gunners forward to begin laying platforms near St Quentin Wood. By 18 September, the guns were in position, ammunition had been brought up to forward dumps, and the brigade fired in support of the surprise attack during the Battle of Épehy. The initial attack was successful, and the artillery then crushed a German counter-attack.

After carrying out HF tasks and fire support for preliminary operations to close up to the Hindenburg Line, the 83rd Brigade was ready to support IX Corps' attack on the St Quentin Canal. After two days of bombardment of enemy trenches and machine gun positions, the assault began on 29 September. The 46th (North Midland) Division, which had to storm the canal itself, had the heaviest level of artillery support of any British division in the war. The 69th Siege Battery's role was to breach the canal embankment from Bellenglise to the canal bend in an attempt to drain the water. The assault was a smashing success: the 46th (NM) Division swarmed over the canal across captured bridges and dams, using lifebelts and planks, and took its final objectives before nightfall. The next day, the 69th Siege Battery fired concentrations on Thorigny (near Lehaucourt), supporting the 1st Division's successful follow-up attack.

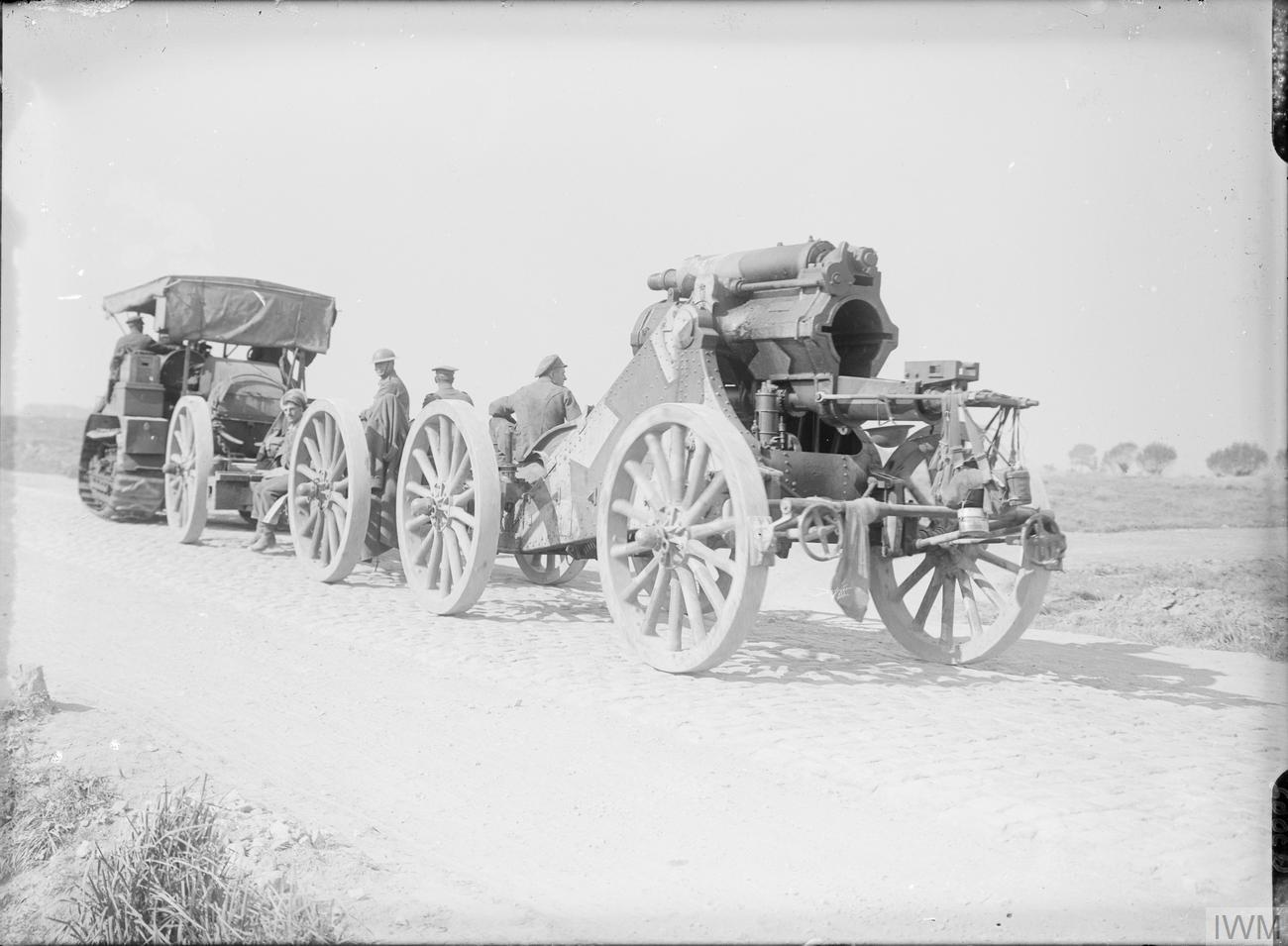
9.2-inch howitzer broken down into three loads for road movement.

The 83rd Brigade now began moving its lighter guns forward across the canal to support the 46th (North Midland) Division in the pursuit, leaving behind the 9.2- and 8-inch howitzers of the 69th and 135th Siege Batteries under the temporary command of the 14th Brigade, RGA, at Lehaucourt in corps reserve. It was not until the night of 12/13 October that it caught up with the rest of the brigade north of Bohain. On 14 October, it bombarded Regnicourt and Vaux Andigny, which had defied an attack by the 46th (North Midland) Division. The Fourth Army's next setpiece operation was the Battle of the Selle, with the 83rd Brigade once more supporting IX Corps. On 15 October, the battery fired on Bois St Pierre, and 16 October was devoted to HF shoots on enemy communications. The attack began at 05:20 on 17 October and quickly achieved an advance of 4,000 yards (3,700 m); the 83rd Brigade's fire then helped to break up a German counter-attack at 11:20. A fresh British attack at 17:00 made further progress, and the next morning, the brigade put down heavy barrages in front of a renewed attack at 11:30. The Germans retired across the Sambre–Oise Canal and destroyed the bridges behind them.

Once again, the 135th and 69th Siege Batteries had to be left behind as the lighter guns followed the pursuit. The 83rd Brigade was pulled out for rest on 25 October, but the 69th Siege Battery was moved up into position on 1 November. On 4 November, the whole brigade supported the 1st Division's successful attack across the Sambre–Oise Canal. Bridgeheads were established, and the infantry pushed on 3,000 yards (2,700 m) beyond the canal. The next day, the German artillery could be seen pulling out and retreating. Again, the 69th Siege Battery had to be left behind as the 83rd Brigade crossed the canal and joined the pursuit. It was still there with the 12th Brigade, RGA, when the Armistice with Germany came into force on 11 November.

During December 1918, the 69th Siege Battery was quartered at Sorée near Namur for the winter, and demobilisation began in the new year. The battery was finally disbanded on 26 October 1919.

== See also ==
- Newsreel film of a 9.2-inch howitzer being fired.
