= 71st (South African) Siege Battery, Royal Garrison Artillery =

71st (South African) Siege Battery, RGA
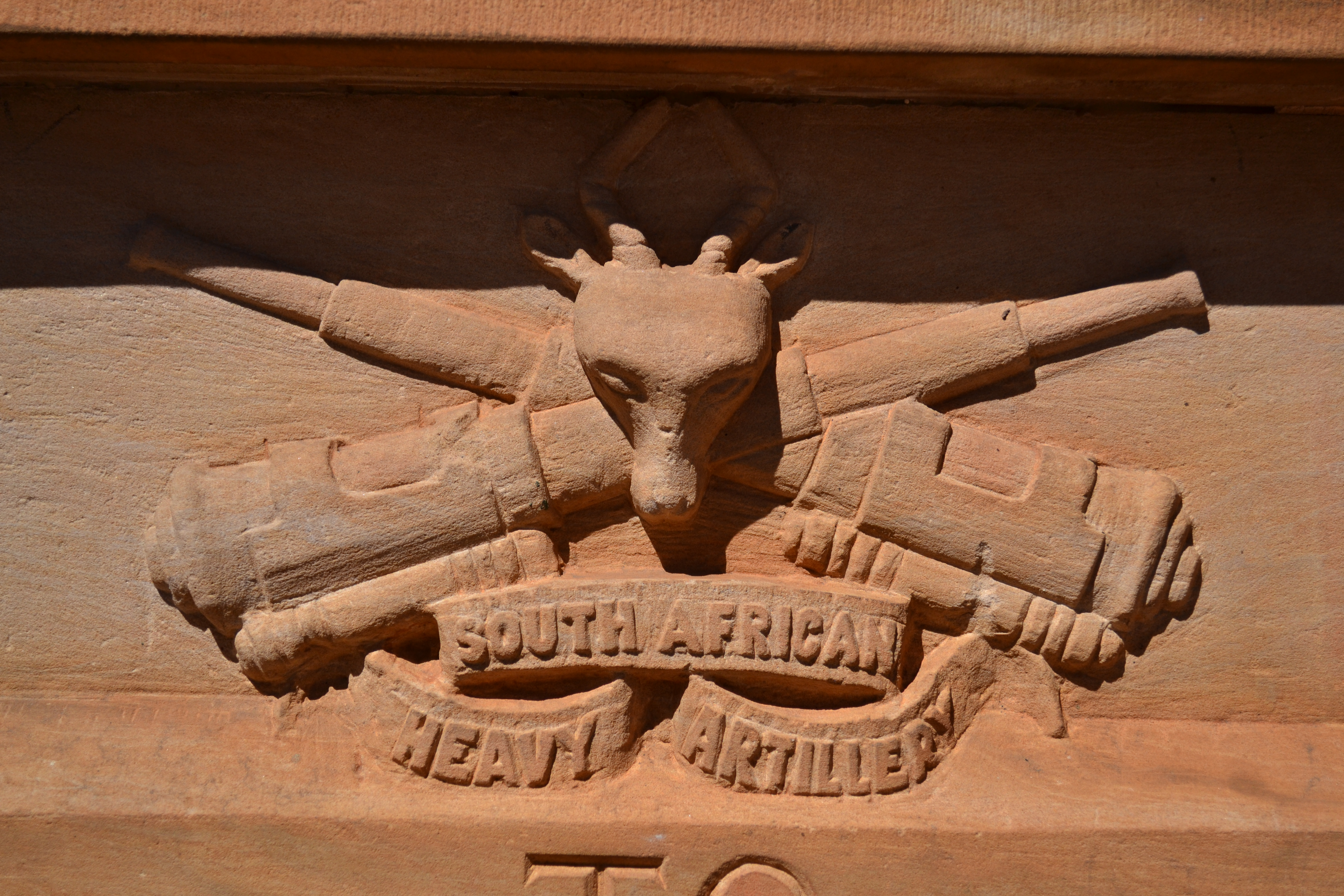
- Badge of the South African Heavy Artillery (from the memorial at Pretoria)
- Active: July 1915–1919
- Country: Union of South Africa
- Branch: Artillery
- Type: Siege
- Part of: South African Heavy Artillery; Royal Garrison Artillery
- Engagements: World War I: Battle of Mount Sorrel; Battle of the Somme; Battle of Bullecourt; Third Battle of Ypres; Battle of Cambrai; Spring Offensive; Hundred Days Offensive

71st (South African) Siege Battery, Royal Garrison Artillery was a unit of the South African Heavy Artillery formed for service with the South African Overseas Expeditionary Force in World War I. It travelled to Europe and fought under British command on the Western Front from 1916 to 1918, seeing action at Mount Sorrel, the Somme, Bullecourt, Ypres and Cambrai, against the German Spring Offensive and in the final Allied Hundred Days Offensive.

== Background ==
In July 1915 after the conclusion of the South West Africa campaign at the beginning of World War I, the South African Overseas Expeditionary Force was created to support the British Empire during the continuing war. The South African Heavy Artillery (SAHA) of five batteries was raised, mainly from volunteers who had seen service with a heavy artillery brigade in South West Africa. Among these was No 3 (Transvaal) Battery. The SAHA sailed from Cape Town on 28 August 1915, bound for Europe.

== Mobilisation and training ==
The batteries landed at Plymouth on 15 September and went to Cooden Camp, Bexhill-on-Sea, for general training. The British War Office decided to equip the SAHA as siege artillery attached to the Royal Garrison Artillery (RGA). Under War Office Instruction No 276 of 20 October 1915, 3rd (Transvaal) Battery was initially designated 71st (Transvaal) Siege Battery, RGA (later simply as 71st (South African) Battery) in the Northern and Central South Africa Siege Brigade. Captain H.C. Harrison was appointed officer commanding (OC). Although numbered as RGA units, the batteries retained their SAHA cap badges and national identity. (Note: From January 1917 they were also paid at UDF rates, which were higher than Imperial rates.) They were to be equipped with tractor-drawn 6-inch howitzers.

The batteries went to the RGA training camp at Lydd in December where they were introduced to modern heavy guns, but did gun drill on 9.45-inch Skoda howitzers from the Second Boer War and their actual field firing with 8-inch rifled muzzle-loading howitzers dating from 1879. Other units under training at Lydd at this time included 67th, 69th and 76th Siege Btys.

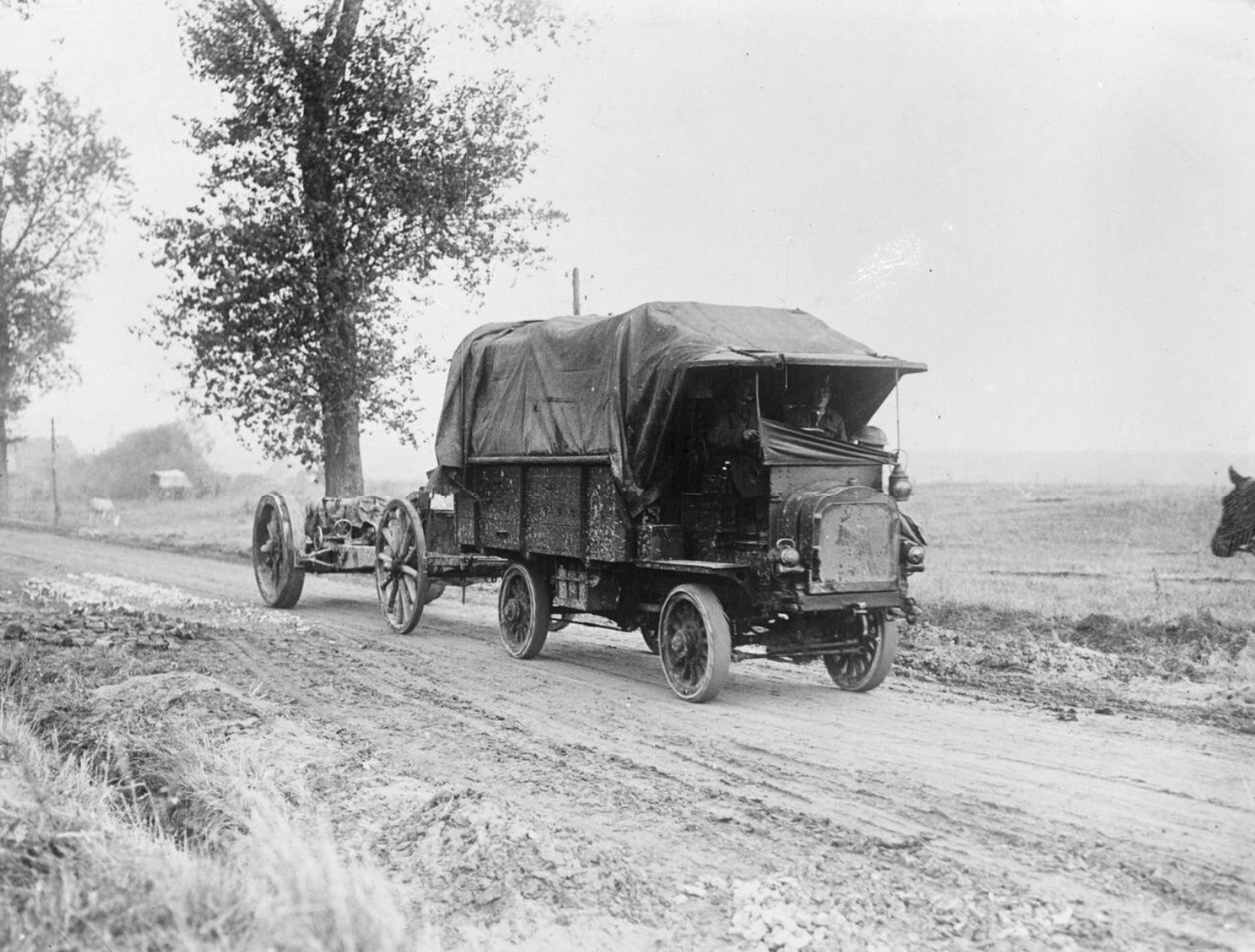
FWD Model B lorry towing a 6-inch 26 cwt howitzer.

On completion of training, Capt Harrison was promoted to major and the battery was equipped with four 6-inch howitzers of the latest 26-cwt pattern. Mobilisation then began: the Northern and Central Brigade mobilised at Woolwich on 8 March 1916 as 44th (South African) Siege Brigade, RGA, and 71st (SA) Siege Bty at Fort Fareham on 6 April. They sent their guns to Avonmouth Docks for despatch to France while the men embarked on the Manchester Importer at Southampton on 15 April and landed at Le Havre next day.

== Service ==
When the SAHA units arrived on the Western Front the policy within the British Expeditionary Force (BEF) was to move batteries frequently between brigades, which were designated Heavy Artillery Groups (HAGs). 71st (SA) Siege Bty left 44th HAG shortly after arrival, and joined 1st HAG on 26 April. 1st HAG was serving with VIII Corps in Fourth Army preparing for that summer's 'Big Push' (the Battle of the Somme). 71st (SA) Siege Bty parked its guns at Raincheval and the men began digging gun positions at Mailly-Maillet. The battery's new guns created considerable interest among the other units equipped with obsolescent 6-inch 30 cwt howitzers.

=== Mount Sorrel ===
The battery completed its positions and came 'into action' on 25 May. The guns were registered on their targets and then remained silent and hidden for the planned offensive. However, the battery was suddenly ordered north on 2 June and joined Canadian Corps Heavy Artillery next day. The Canadians were engaged in the Battle of Mont Sorrel and needed reinforcements. The battery reached Ypres on 4 June and pulled into action near the Dixmude Gate under heavy hostile fire, immediately suffering its first casualties. It remained here until 14 June, almost continuously in action and most of the time under shellfire. It fired a large amount of ammunition – at one point No 1 gun team fired 81 rounds (each weighing 100 pounds (45 kg)) in 29 minutes. By the end of this period the battery had suffered 35 casualties from a strength of 150 men.

=== Somme ===
71st (SA) Siege Bty returned to its previous positions at Mailly-Maillet on 18 June in time to take part in the Somme Offensive. The main bombardment was to extend over five days, U, V, W, X and Y, before the assault was launched on Z day. Tasks for the HAGs included counter-battery (CB) fire and direct bombardment of selected targets. Each day began with an 80-minute concentrated barrage, simulating the opening of the attack. The strenuous work of firing the heavy guns and howitzers was divided into 2-hour periods to allow the gunners to rest, forward observation officers (FOOs) to be relieved, and the guns to cool. The bombardment continued through the night, but half the guns were rested. U Day was 24 June, but on several days the weather was too bad for good air or ground observation and the programme was extended by two days (Y1 and Y2). The final bombardment began at 06.25 on Z Day (1 July), with a 65-minute barrage. VIII Corps' objectives were the villages of Serre and Beaumont-Hamel. Corps orders laid down a succession of lifts for the heavy artillery: off the front trench 10 minutes before Zero hour then onto the reserve trenches and each of the infantry's successive objectives in turn. Destruction of the enemy trenches was effective, but the CB fire less so, and many machine gun post were untouched. The assaulting infantry were cut down by fire within minutes of leaving their trenches and never reached most of their objectives. A second attack was hastily organised for the afternoon, with the heavy artillery bombarding the front line again from 12.00 to 12.25. This attack also failed and further attempts were called off that evening.

The First day on the Somme had been a disaster for VIII Corps, and no further attacks were made on that part of the front until later in the year. Accordingly, 71st (SA) Siege Bty moved south to Becordel on 5 July and joined 36th (Australian) HAG near Fricourt and Mametz, which had been captured by XV Corps on 1–2 July. From Becordel the battery fired in support of the further operations to capture Mametz Wood, Ovillers and Contalmaison. Major Harrison carried out several reconnaissances of Pozières when it was in No man's land, and was awarded the Distinguished Service Order (DSO); he was also evacuated for a time with gas poisoning. The Battle of Pozières was fought by II Corps under Reserve Army, then on 10 September 71st (SA) Siege Bty together with several Australian batteries transferred to the command of 59th HAG under Canadian Corps. However, the battery remained at Becordel, firing during the Battle of Flers–Courcelette on 15 September, when the Canadians captured the sugar factory and gained a foothold in Courcelette, which was cleared over the next two days.

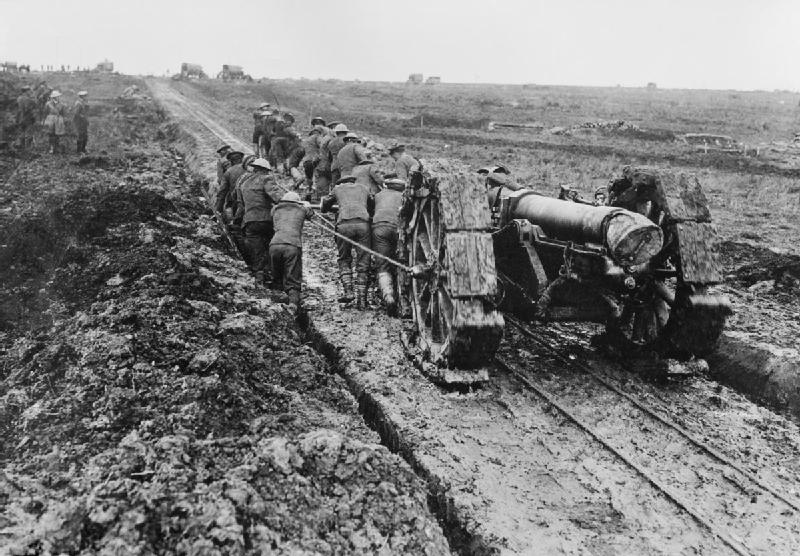
6-inch howitzer being moved through mud on the Western Front.

On 20 September the battery moved forward to Bazentin, where the range to the enemy was shorter, but where mud was a serious problem. The battery's primary targets during the autumn were Courcelette and Regina Trenches and the Zollern Redoubt, which the Canadians attacked on 26 September (part of the Battle of Thiepval Ridge). During October (the Battle of the Ancre Heights) II Corps and the Canadians were held up at Regina Trench. One particular German bombing post proved a problem. The infantry were withdrawn to communication and support trenches while 71st (SA) Siege Bty's FOO, Capt A.E. Rann, and his signallers set up their observation post (OP) in the trench just 50 yards (46 m) from the target. From this dangerous position, over two days, he brought down accurate fire from the battery to render the German post untenable; Rann was awarded the Military Cross (MC). The Canadians completed the Capture of Regina Trench on 10 November. The Battle of the Ancre on 13–18 November was the final phase of that year's Somme Offensive. On 22 December 71st (SA) Siege Bty was pulled out to Beauval for rest and Maj Harrison, still suffering from the effects of gas, was evacuated to England leaving Capt Rann in command.

=== Ancre ===
The battery returned to the line at Ovillers on 2 January 1917, firing on trench targets. The problems now were frost, leading to damage to gun carriages, and sickness. On 5 February 59th HAG went into reserve and 71st (SA) Siege Bty transferred to 2nd HAG next day. Fifth Army (formerly Reserve Army) was continuing low-level operations on the Ancre, and on 17 February II Corps attacked Loupart Wood and Miraumont. For three days beforehand, the heavy artillery carried out CB shoots and barbed wire-cutting, the latter using the '106' instantaneous fuze. 2nd HAG was defined as a 'siege group' from Zero, bombarding the enemy's rear lines, machine gun emplacements, etc, as the infantry advanced at 05.45. The thawing mud slowed the infantry and German retaliation was fierce, and the operation fell far short of its objectives.

On 8 March 71st (SA) Siege Bty moved two guns up to Thiepval to take part in a renewal of the operations against Loupart Wood and Miraumont, but just before the attack was due the Germans on this front began their withdrawal to the Hindenburg Line (Operation Alberich). The battery was among the forces that followed up: on 22 March it attempted to go cross-country to join the Albert–Bapaume road, the only one capable of taking heavy guns, but three of the guns were ditched on the way. The single gun that reached the road joined the stream of traffic going forwards, and went into action on 23 March at Ervillers, shelling Croisilles and Écoust. The battery had been ordered to come under 4th HAG on 21 March, but did not actually join up with it at Béhagnies, north of Bapaume, until 29 March, the rest of the group having been forbidden to use the fragile roads across the devastated zone. It was not until 3 April that the other three guns caught up, when the battery engaged tenacious German rearguards in Saint-Léger and Écoust until they were driven back within the Hindenburg Line.

=== Bullecourt ===
Once it had closed up to the Hindenburg Line, Fifth Army was in position to assist Third Army's Arras Offensive, launched on 9 April, with a subsidiary attack at Bullecourt on 11 April. The Germans counter-attacked (Operation Battering Ram) and fierce fighting continued at Bullecourt for several weeks. The battery pushed 3 guns forward on 23 April and on 1 May it moved to Mory. Here it had an excellent OP ('C1a') with views over practically every enemy battery position, allowing effective CB shooting. Neutralising fire was brought down every time one particularly troublesome battery at Riencourt opened up. Other targets were stretches of wire and two strongpoints in the Hindenburg Line dubbed 'Gog' and 'Magog'.

71st (SA) Siege Bty came under the command of 40th HAG on 18 May, reverting to 4th HAG on 9 July. On 4 July it moved 2 guns up to Croisilles, only 2,000 yards (1,800 m) from the Hindenburg Line and able to reach every battery and strongpoint visible from C1a. The other two guns were pulled into position about 600 yards (550 m) behind a few days later. Apart from CB shoots, the battery fired at fleeting targets such as enemy troop movements and working parties. The gun-pits were well sheltered, but the battery suffered a few casualties. On 29 July the forward section came under heavy hostile CB fire during which one gun received a direct hit and Maj Rann was wounded; Capt P.N.G. Fitzpatrick took over command. The battery came under 55th HAG from 9 August, but the targets remained the same.

=== Ypres ===
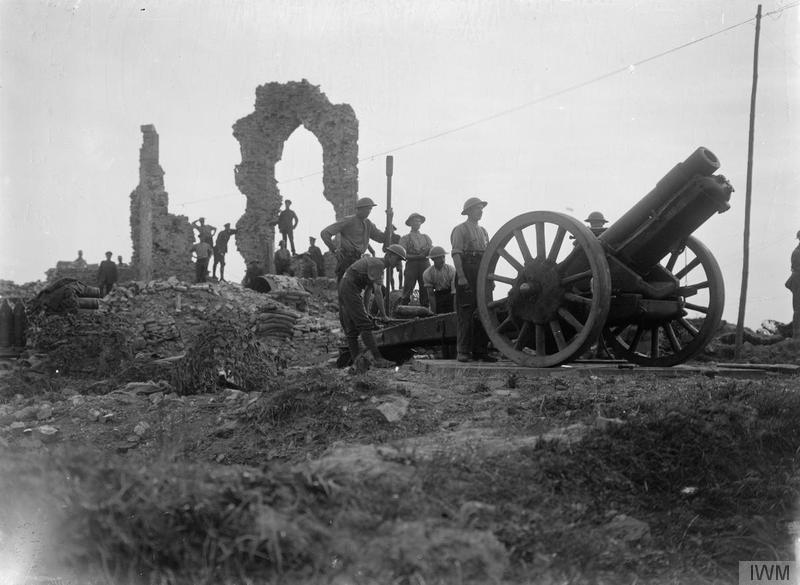
6-inch howitzer and crew during the Ypres offensive, 1917.

On 31 August Right Section (RX) of the battery pulled out and went north with two guns under Maj Fitzgerald to Ypres, where the Third Ypres Offensive was under way. It came under the orders of 13th HAG and took over a position just outside the Menin Gate. The day after it arrived it fired 1133 rounds on hostile batteries, but was subjected to a heavy gas bombardment, resulting in 60 casualties. The section participated in the fighting on Frezenberg Ridge of 9 September. The remainder of the battery arrived on 15 September. The whole battery was now with V Corps as part of the massive artillery preparations for the Battle of the Menin Road Ridge on 20 September. CB fire was vital to the plan, and 71st (SA) Siege Bty concentrated on 'Vampire' and 'Boiry' Farms. In this battle the battery was supporting 9th (Scottish) Division including 1st South African Brigade, the only time it did so during the war. The infantry assault was successful, largely because of the artillery support, though the South African brigade suffered severe casualties when the division to its left was held up.

For the next phase of the offensive, the Battle of Polygon Wood on 26 September, 71st (SA) Siege Bty transferred to 48th HAG on 22 September and fired barrage lines and 'crash' barrages around Zonnebeke. It then moved forward to 'Cavalry Farm' on 28 September, to support the attack at the Battle of Broodseinde on 4 October. In the preliminary bombardment it fired on Hill 40 and Niewedlin, and swept the area round Passchendaele. After that advance it went up to 'Bavaria House' on 5 October.

By now the gunners were struggling to bring up guns and ammunition through the morass of mud to continue the offensive at the Battle of Poelcappelle on 9 October and the First Battle of Passchendaele on 12 October. Conditions for the artillery were by now very bad: British batteries were clearly observable from the Passchendaele Ridge and suffered badly from CB fire, while their own guns sank into the mud and became difficult to aim and fire. For a period the battery could only keep two guns in action. New Zealand infantry helped to carry up the ammunition. In a period of 14 days at Bavaria Farm 71st (SA) Siege Bty lost four men killed and 25 wounded. The only shelter for the gunners was in the ramparts of Ypres, a march of 5–6 km from the gun positions along a route that was frequently under fire.

The gunners of 71st (SA) Siege Bty were relieved in the line by 2nd Canadian Siege Bty on 22 October and sent to Liévin in the comparatively quiet Lens sector for rest. Here it took over the former positions of 2nd Canadian Siege Bty and was briefly under the command of 2nd Canadian HAG before joining 42nd HAG on 29 October.

=== Cambrai ===
Rested and reinforced, the battery handed its guns over to 73rd (SA) Siege Bty, also being rested from the Ypres fighting, and moved out with that battery's guns on 8 November, joining a long convoy of heavy artillery marching south to reinforce Third Army for the Battle of Cambrai. (To maintain secrecy the cover story was that they were heading to the Italian Front.) During the journey it collected two new spare howitzers, to ensure that it would be able to keep guns in action. It pulled its guns into camouflaged positions on the outskirts of Gouzeaucourt on 13 November, coming under 87th HAG in III Corps. The plan was to break through the Hindenburg Line with a tank attack following a massive surprise bombardment using Predicted fire. III Corps' objective was the Marcoing–Masnières line. Zero was 06.20 on 20 November, and by 10.00 the rapid advance of the tanks and infantry had driven the enemy out of range of the battery's guns.

Next day 87th HAG HQ with 71st and another battery moved across to Haplincourt and came under IV Corps for the continuation of the offensive. 71st (SA) Siege Bty was positioned in a dip in the open country between Demicourt and Doignies on 22 November. Unusually, Bourlon Wood and many of the battery's other targets could be clearly seen from the gun positions, without requiring a forward OP. The Germans launched a devastating counter-attack on 30 November and although those attacking IV Corps from Bourlon Wood were caught in the open by the guns and halted, elsewhere they briefly captured Gouzeaucourt and threatened a complete breakthrough. The corps' guns could enfilade the whole front and they continued firing on subsequent days; on one occasion 71st (SA) Siege Bty fired as many as 1500 rounds. Frequent switches in command – IV Corps handed over to V Corps on 1 December and 71st went to 44th (SA) HAG on 30 November, to 17th HAG on 9 December and then back to 87th HAG on 15 December – caused problems for the signallers, who had to lay down fresh lines each time. Major Fitzgerald exercised his own discretion in selecting targets among the massed German forces that could be seen in front, depending on the ammunition available. Ammunition supply was by light railway and ordinary wagons, supplemented by supply tanks. Although V Corps maintained its positions, these were now in a dangerous salient and it had to withdraw on 5 December to conform with the retreat on its flank, leaving 71st (SA) Siege Bty within 1,400 yards (1,300 m) of the new German front line, which was visible from No 3 gun-pit.

The battery's billets were pulled back to Beaumetz-lès-Cambrai, but even this was under harassing shellfire. On 14 December Maj Fitzgerald was killed and another officer mortally wounded by the same shell. Major C.H. Hall arrived to take command on 18 December, when the guns were pulled back from their exposed position to Beaumetz.

=== Winter 1917–18 ===
At the end of 1917 the BEF's policy changed and HAGs became permanent brigades once more. The opportunity was taken to reunite the South African brigades, and on 24 December 71st (SA) Siege Bty was ordered to join 44th (SA) HAG. After the battery's previous brief attachment earlier in December, that HQ had moved north to join I Corps with I First Army. 44th (SA) HAG (redesignated a brigade from 25 January 1918) regained its largely South African character, commanding three South African 6-inch howitzer batteries (71st, 73rd and 125th) and one RGA 8-inch howitzer battery. 71st (SA) Siege Bty joined the brigade in the La Bassée sector on 29 December, with Left Section at Beuvry, Right Section at Labourse. The guns at Beuvry were registered on 1 January and then fell silent, while those of Labourse were called upon for SOS fire on 4 January before they had time to register. However, the battery positions were a long way behind the front, with only the German frontline trenches in range, and at that time the La Bassée sector was quiet. Between 9 and 30 January the whole brigade was withdrawn for rest, with 71st at Manqueville. Left Section went back to Beuvry on 30 January, while Right Section went to Locon before returning to La Bourse on 25 February. The batteries spent some time preparing reserve positions in the rear, in anticipation of a German attack.

Since 1916 the aim had been to increase siege batteries to six guns each; this was usually done by forming new batteries in England, and then dividing them between experienced batteries after they arrived on the Western Front. On 6 March 1918 71st (SA) Siege Bty was joined by a section from 496th (SA) Siege Bty, which had been formed the previous August (its other section went to 75th (SA) Siege Bty). The additional two howitzers were positioned at Beuvry. Major W. Brydon took command of 71st (SA) Siege Bty on 21 January until he returned to 73rd (SA) Siege Bty on 14 February and was succeeded by Maj E.H. Tamplin. 71st (SA) Siege Bty supported 55th (West Lancashire) Division at Givenchy-lès-la-Bassée in Trench raiding. XI Corps took over the sector on 19 March.

=== Spring Offensive ===
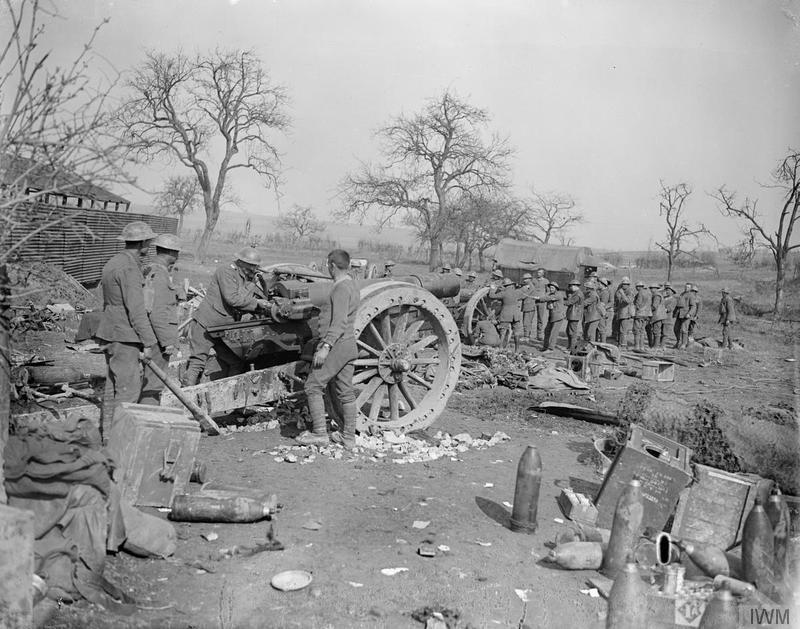
Gunners cleaning and positioning 6-inch howitzers, March 1918.

When the German Spring Offensive was launched in 21 March First Army's front was not attacked, though it was heavily bombarded with a mixture of high explosive and gas for day after day. The second phase of the offensive (the Battle of the Lys) began on 9 April with an attack on a wide front including the Givenchy sector. 55th (WL) Division held its ground, but the Portuguese division to its left was forced back and the Germans reached the gun lines: 73rd (SA) Siege Bty suffered very heavy casualties and 71st had to swing its guns at Beuvry round to engage German infantry and guns at short range. The guns remained in continuous action for several days, helping to halt another major attack on 12 April (the Battle of Hazebrouck), when I Corps HQ had taken over the sector. The targets included hostile batteries and Kite balloon sites, transport columns on the packed roads behind German lines, and fleeting targets reported by reconnaissance aircraft. From 9 to 17 April the battery fired over 11,000 rounds. Another heavy attack came in on Givenchy on 18 April (the Battle of Béthune), with shells falling all around the battery positions. One gun was put temporarily out of action by the La Bassée canal being flooded. Communications between battery and brigade HQs were cut off and the officer at Beuvry had to act on his own initiative. Despite a hostile aircraft ranging guns on the battery's sites, it only suffered 11 wounded, though 27 gas casualties were later evacuated. The attack on Givenchy was successfully repulsed, and the battery supported a counter-attack the following night. Over the next few days the battery switched its guns between positions at Beuvry cemetery and slagheap, and Labourse, but remained under fire. On 1 May the battery took up positions behind Annequin, sending two guns forward from 2 to 9 May for a specific task with aircraft observation against a hostile battery and ammunition dump.

The battery continued to duel with hostile batteries: on 25 May it again pushed two guns forward to Annequin to get within range of some of them, but came under fire after two days and eventually the section found a covered position behind a coal mine (Fosse 9) at Annequin. Meanwhile, the gun site at Labourse suffered 25 casualties from gas shelling on 25 May. On 1 June the battery carried out special bombardments of enemy machine gun positions at the request of 55th (WL) Division. On 28 June the whole brigade was pulled out for a month's rest and training at a reserve position at Houchin.

=== Hundred Days Offensive ===
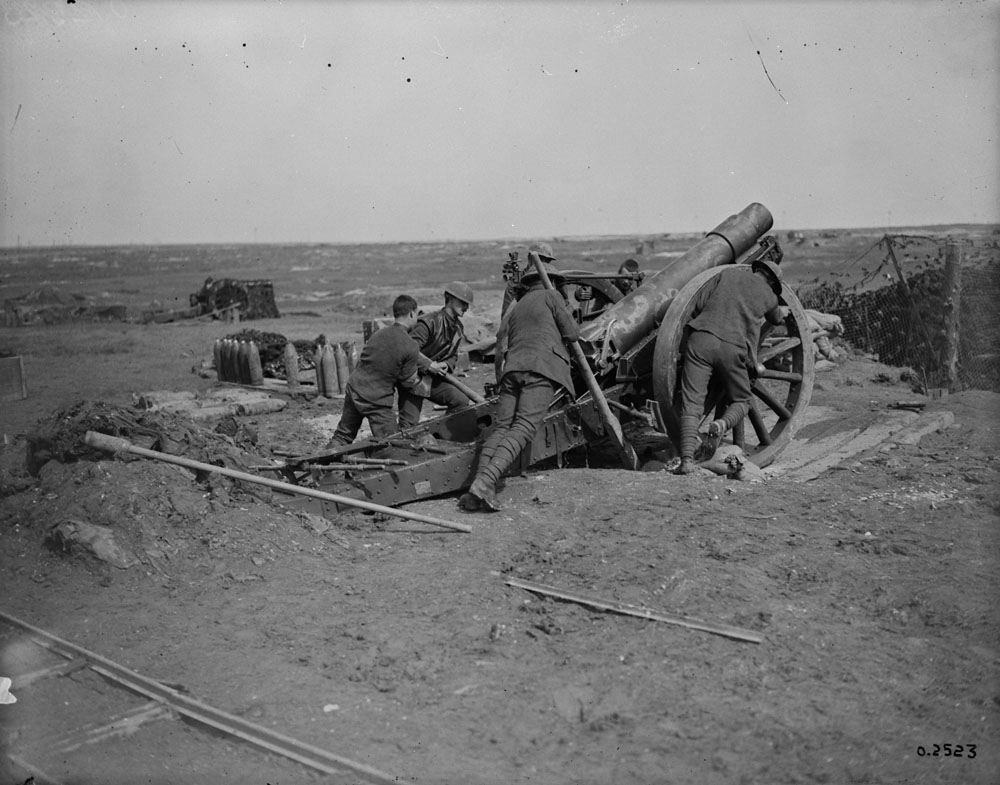
Crew positioning a 6-inch 26 cwt howitzer in 1918.

44th (SA) Brigade returned to the line in the Hulluch sector at the end of July. 71st (SA) Siege Bty establishing a section in a silent position at Sailly-Labourse and the rest of the battery going into action on 31 July 4 at Vermelles, with billets at Hersin-Coupigny. During August the pressure was kept up to assist the Allied Hundred Days Offensive that was launched further south on 8 August. The guns at Vermelles averaged 300 rounds per day, mainly on hostile batteries if the weather was clear enough for observation aircraft, otherwise on wire-cutting and gas bombardments. In early September the silent guns at Sailly were brought up to Mazingarbe, and then joined the rest of the battery at Vermelles, but enemy high velocity guns made the billets at Coupigny untenable, and the gunners moved into the wood at Ruitz.

By now the Germans were unable to mount any kind of offensive operations, and the British infantry on the Hulluch sector seized the initiative, with 71st (SA) Siege Bty supporting operations by 11th (Northern) Division that captured Fosse 8, 'The Craters' and 'Railway Triangle'. An OP was established on top of Fosse 8 with a telephone line to the battery, which could then accurately fire on the enemy wire in front of La Bassée. The Germans withdrew 3 miles (4.8 km) on 1 October and the battery sent three guns up to the old British front line to harass their troops and transport. After roads had been made passable, 44th (SA) Bde began the advance across the old No man's land into Hulluch. Two of 71st's guns went back to act as a demonstration battery at I Corps' Artillery School at Herly, but the remainder kept firing on targets indicated by observation aircraft, either on enemy batteries and machine gun nests, or on moving enemy troops and transport. On 12 October the brigade supported 15th (Scottish) Division's capture of Vendin-le-Vieil.

The Germans resumed their retreat on 15 October, and I Corps crossed the Haute Deûle canal under protection from the guns. Two guns went up to the canal bank, and as soon as a pontoon bridge was completed, these two guns crossed into Carvin on the morning of 17 October, being the first siege guns of the corps to get over. However, the battery was unable to fire for several days, the enemy having retreated out of range, destroying the roads and bridges behind them. Over a period of seven days the battery worked its four guns up, the FWD gun tractors hauling them cross-country into position. On 26 October the battery went into action near Lesdain, where it was joined on 3 November by the section from I Corps School. The Germans were lining the Escaut Canal some 2,700 yards (2,500 m) away. The battery carried out a great deal of CB work against the hostile batteries, which were particularly active just before the Germans withdrew on the night of 7/8 November. The battery fired its last salvo the following morning. It was unable to follow until the canal had been bridged. On the morning of 9 November a reconnaissance party from the battery went out looking for suitable gun positions and found itself in front of the advancing infantry, as the first Allied troops seen in some of the liberated villages. Hostilities ended when the Armistice with Germany came into force on 11 November.

The South African Heavy Artillery was demobilised after the Armistice. During the war 71st (SA) Siege Bty had suffered 277 casualties, including 26 deaths. A large number of the casualties were the result of mustard gas and many were able to return to the front after treatment.

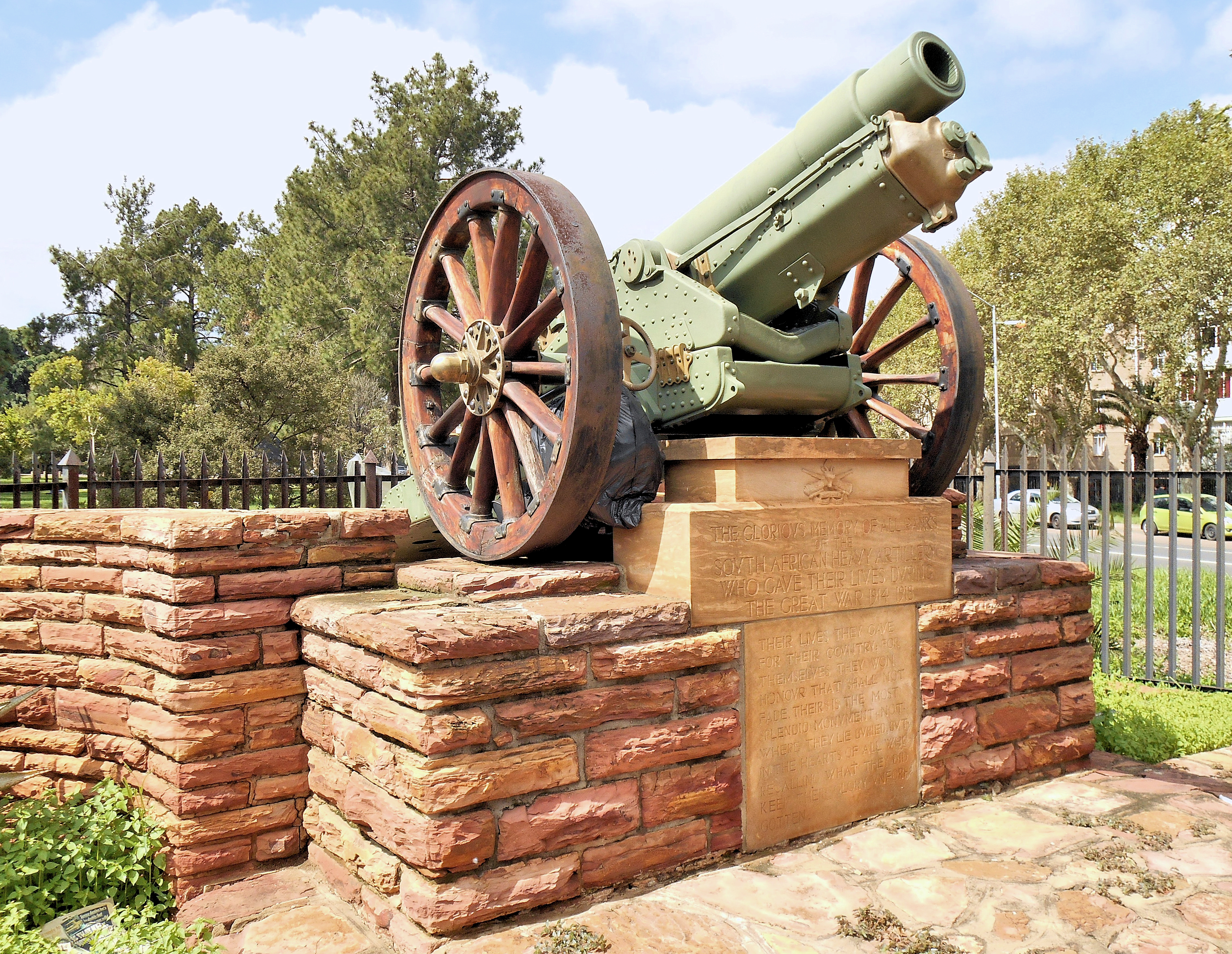
South African Heavy Artillery Memorial, Pretoria.

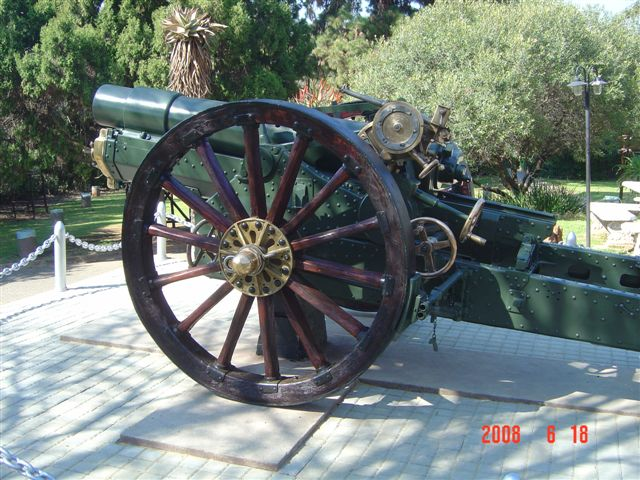
71st (Transvaal) Siege Bty's memorial, Johannesburh.

== Memorials ==
The South African Heavy Artillery Memorial, including a 6-inch howitzer brought back from the Western Front, stands in Pretoria. 71st (Transvaal) Siege Battery has its own memorial in the form of another 6-inch howitzer at Johannesburg Zoo.
