= South African Heavy Artillery =

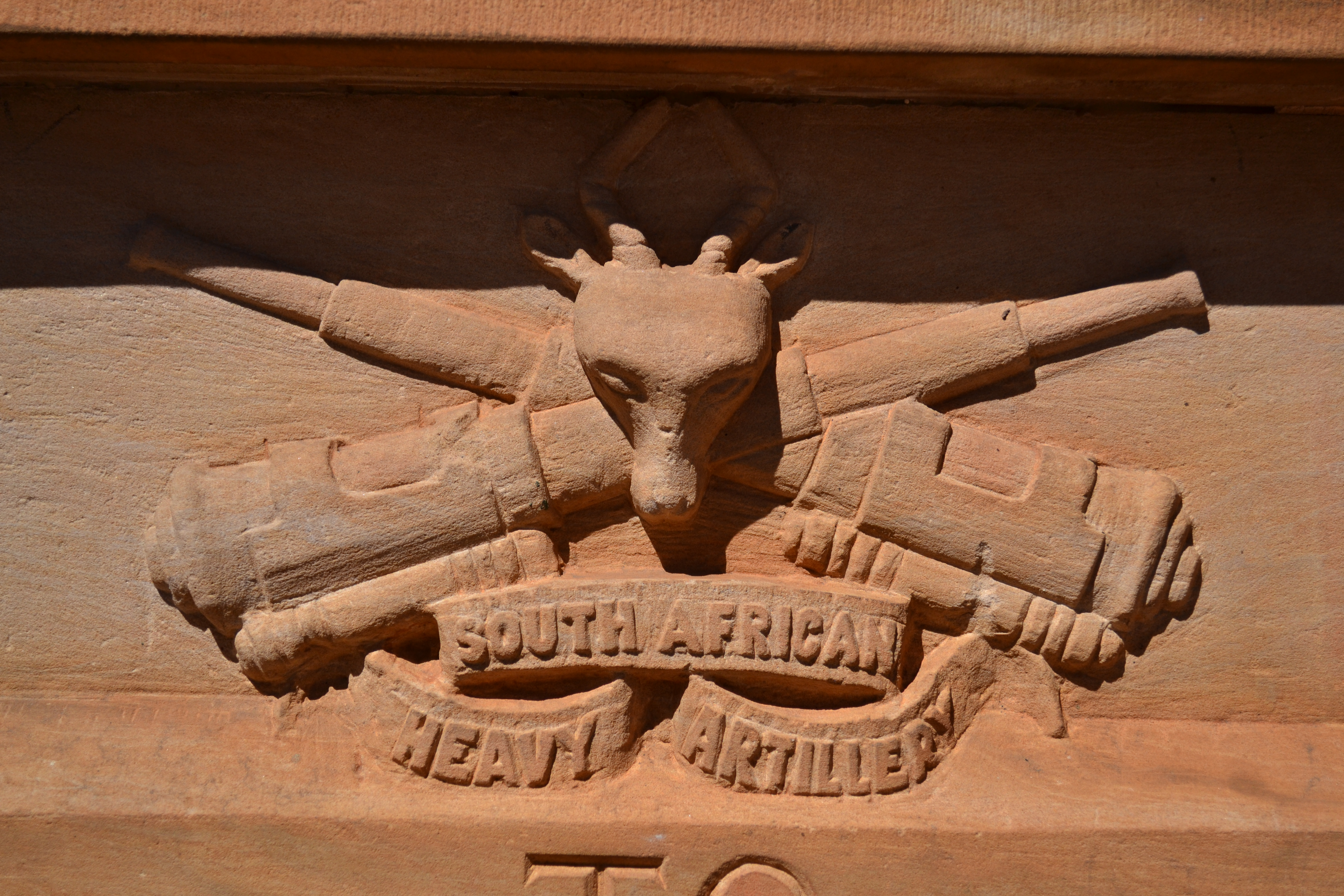
- Badge of the South African Heavy Artillery
- Active: July 1915–1919
- Country: Union of South Africa
- Branch: Artillery
- Type: Heavy
- Size: 6 Siege batteries
- Part of: South African Overseas Expeditionary Force; Royal Garrison Artillery
- Engagements: Western Front (World War I)

The South African Heavy Artillery (SAHA) was a regiment formed in 1915 as part of the South African Overseas Expeditionary Force to serve under British command during World War I. It never fought as a single formation, but contributed a number of batteries and brigades to the Royal Garrison Artillery that fought on the Western Front from 1916 until the Armistice.

== Background ==
The South African Union Defence Act of 1914 forbade the deployment of South African troops outside of its national borders and immediate surrounding territories. After the suppression of the Maritz rebellion and the successful conclusion of the South West Africa campaign at the beginning of World War I, the South African Overseas Expeditionary Force (SAOEF) was created in July 1915 to support the British Empire during the continuing war. It consisted of volunteers from the Union Defence Force (UDF) and had the status of Imperial troops under British command, rather than independent South African units.

== South African Heavy Artillery Regiment ==
A heavy artillery brigade armed with 4.7-inch and 4-inch naval guns had served in the South West Africa campaign. It had been formed at Cape Town from volunteers from various UDF artillery regiments (including the Cape Garrison Artillery and the Durban Garrison Artillery) with a nucleus of officers and non-commissioned officers from the Royal Marine Artillery. This brigade reached a strength of 60 officers and 1000 men but was disbanded in July 1915 at the conclusion of the campaign, and shortly afterwards a 600-strong regiment of heavy artillery was formed for the SAOEF, largely from ex-members of the earlier brigade. When it sailed from Cape Town on 28 August 1915 it was organised into five batteries:

- No 1 (Western Cape Province) Battery, SAHA
- No 2 (Eastern Cape Province) Battery, SAHA
- No 3 (Transvaal) Battery, SAHA
- No 4 (Kimberley and the Diamond Districts) Battery, SAHA
- No 5 (Province of Natal) Battery, SAHA

== Organisation and training ==
The regiment landed at Plymouth on 15 September and went to Cooden Camp, Bexhill-on-Sea, for general training. The British War Office decided to equip the SAHA as siege artillery attached to the Royal Garrison Artillery (RGA). Although numbered as RGA units, the batteries retained their SAHA cap badges and national identity. (Note: From January 1917 they were also paid at UDF rates, which were higher than Imperial rates.) Under War Office Instruction No 276 of 20 October 1915, they were to be equipped with tractor-drawn 6-inch howitzers and organised as follows:

- Northern and Central South Africa Siege Brigade, RGA
  - 71st (Transvaal) Siege Battery, RGA
  - 72nd (Central and Diamond) Siege Battery, RGA
- Cape Province Siege Brigade, RGA
  - 73rd (Cape Peninsula) Siege Battery, RGA
  - 74th (Eastern and Port Elizabeth) Siege Battery, RGA
- Unbrigaded
  - 75th (Natal) Siege Battery, RGA

(The brigades and batteries soon dropped their provincial subtitles and became simply 'South African'.)

The batteries went to the RGA training camp at Lydd in December where they were introduced to modern heavy guns, but did gun drill on 9.45-inch Skoda howitzers from the Second Boer War and their actual field firing with 8-inch rifled muzzle-loading howitzers dating from 1879. Other units under training at Lydd at this time included 69th and 76th Siege Btys.

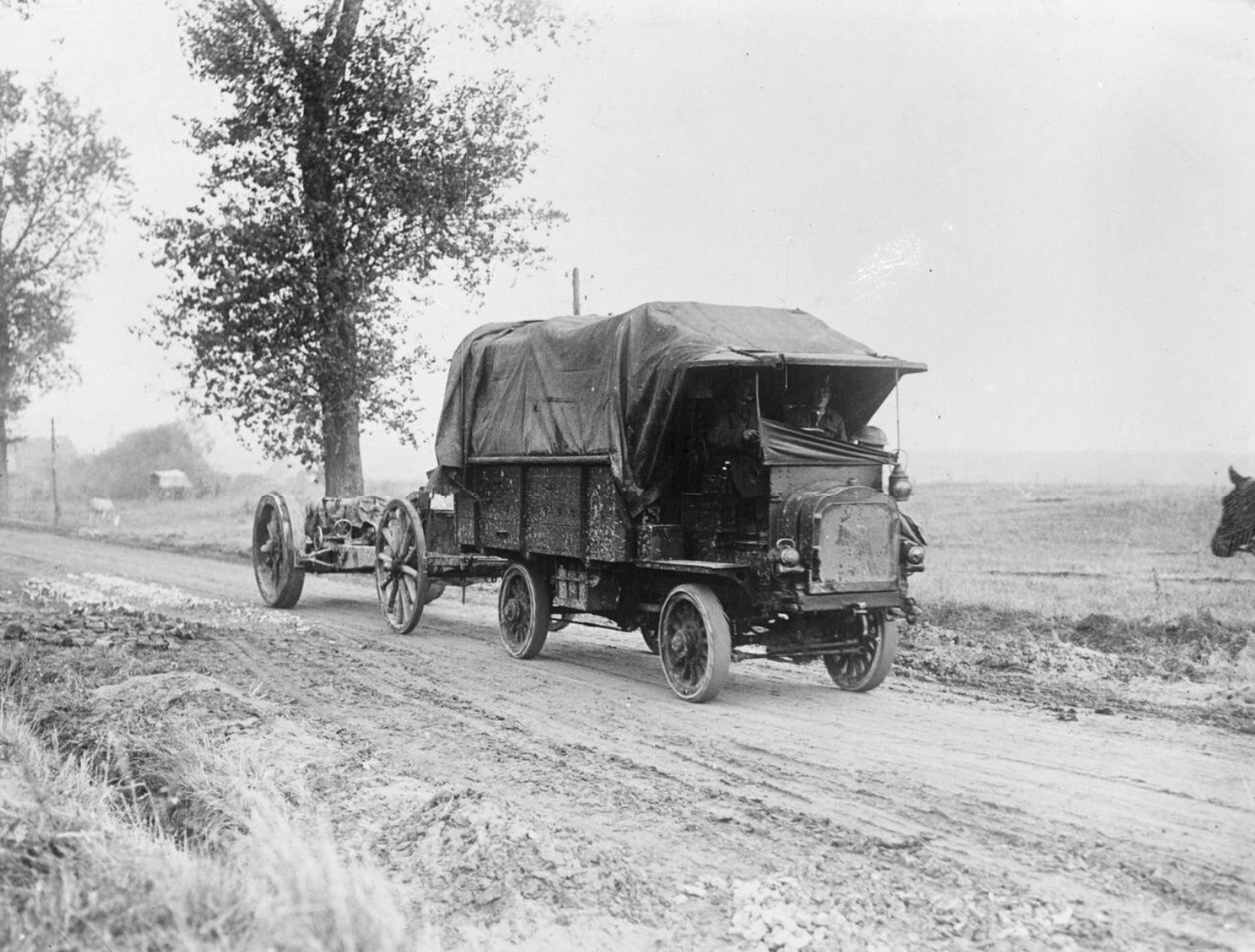
FWD Model B lorry towing a 6-inch 26 cwt howitzer.

On completion of training, each of the batteries was equipped with four 6-inch howitzers of the latest 26-cwt pattern. Mobilisation then began: the Northern and Central Brigade mobilised at Woolwich on 8 March 1916 as 44th (South African) Siege Brigade, RGA, and 71st (SA) Siege Bty at Fort Fareham on 6 April. They embarked at Southampton on 15 April and landed at Le Havre next day, followed by 72nd (SA) Siege Bty on 21 April. 75th (SA) Siege Bty arrived on 23 April, and 72nd and 73rd on 30 April. The Cape Province Siege Brigade did not mobilise until 30 April, when it became 50th (South African) Siege Brigade, RGA. It arrived in France in June, when it was assigned two British RGA batteries.

== Reinforcements ==
Immediately the first five batteries had begun mobilising, an additional 6-inch howitzer siege battery was formed on 3 April 1916 from the remaining SAHA details at Bexhill. This was 125th (SA) Siege Bty, which went to the Western Front in July.

At the end of 1916 a policy was adopted of increasing RGA batteries to six guns. Over the next year this was done by forming new batteries in England, and then breaking them up on arrival on the Western Front, sending them by sections to reinforce existing batteries. Three new South African 6-inch batteries were therefore formed:

- 496th (SA) Siege Bty formed about August 1917; arrived on Western Front February 1918 and split between 71st and 73rd (SA) Siege Btys
- 497th (SA) Siege Bty formed about August 1917; arrived on Western Front February 1918 and split between 72nd and 74th (SA) Siege Btys
- 542nd (SA) Siege Bty formed January 1918; arrived on Western Front May 1918 and split between 75th and 125th (SA) Siege Btys

In addition, 552nd (SA) Siege Bty, equipped with 8-inch howitzers, began to form in autumn 1918 but was too late to see action. (Note: The South African Official History states that a '52nd Siege Bty' was formed with 8-inch howitzers in autumn 1918, 52nd Siege Bty, RGA, was in fact formed in 1915 and equipped with 12-inch howitzers on railway mountings. Other sources confirm that the battery was numbered 552nd.)

== Service ==
When the SAHA units arrived on the Western Front the policy within the British Expeditionary Force (BEF) was to move batteries frequently between brigades, which were designated Heavy Artillery Groups (HAGs). On arrival, the South African batteries began registering targets for that summer's 'Big Push' (the Battle of the Somme) but 71st and 72nd had to interrupt their preparations and move north to reinforce the Canadian Corps at the Battle of Mont Sorrel. They returned in time for the First day on the Somme, when 73rd and 74th (SA) Btys supported the diversionary Attack on the Gommecourt Salient as part of 46th HAG. All six South African batteries served during the Somme offensive. By late 1916 44th (SA) Bde was commanding heavy rather than siege batteries, including 22nd and 126th (Camberwell) Heavy Btys.

Throughout 1917 the batteries were frequently switched from one HAG to another. 71st and 75th (SA) Siege Btys remained in the Somme sector, following up the German withdrawal to the Hindenburg Line (Operation Alberich) in March, and 71st Bty and 44th (SA) Bde participated in the Battle of Bullecourt. 72nd and 73rd (SA) Siege Btys and 44th (SA) Bde fired in support of the Canadian Corps at the Battle of Vimy, and 72nd continued with that formation for the remainder of the Arras Offensive and the Battle of Hill 70 (when 50th (SA) Bde also supported the Canadians). Meanwhile 73rd (SA) Siege Bty moved to the Ypres Salient for the Third Ypres Offensive. 74th (SA) Siege Bty supported the advance of the 1st South African Brigade at the start of the Arras Offensive, and then moved to Ypres. 125th (SA) Siege Bty also fought at Arras and Hill 70 and then was attached to the Belgian Army for the rest of the year. At the end of August, 71st also went north to join the Ypres offensive, suffering badly from counter-battery (CB) fire in the later stages of the fighting. In September it supported 9th (Scottish) Division, which included the 1st SA Bde. 71st Siege Bty was relieved in this dangerous area by 73rd, which in turn was relieved by 72nd. 71st was then sent to participate in the Battle of Cambrai, where the German counter-attack came near to its gun positions.

At the end of 1917 the BEF's policy changed and HAGs became permanent brigades once more. 44th and 50th HAGs were designated 8-inch howitzer brigades, each containing a British RGA battery equipped with this weapon, but both regained their largely South African character with the following organisation:

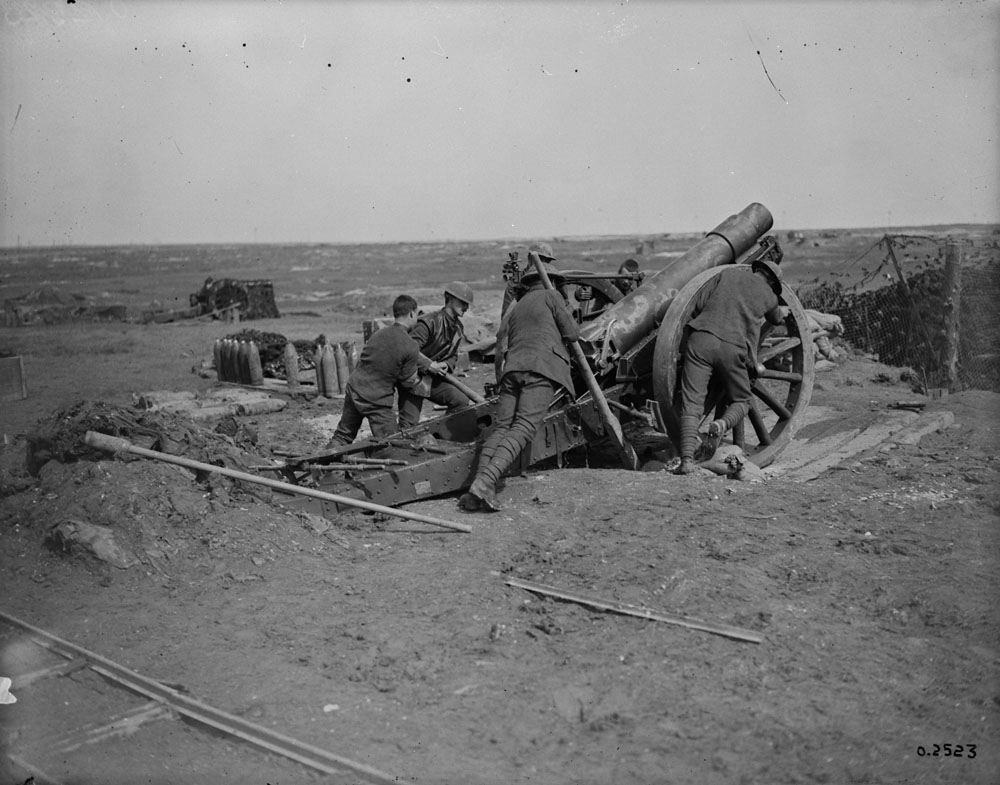
Crew positioning a 6-inch 26 cwt howitzer in 1918.

- 44th (SA) Brigade
  - 71st (SA) Siege Bty – 4 x 6-inch howitzers
  - 73rd (SA) Siege Bty – 4 x 6-inch howitzers
  - 125th (SA) Siege Bty – 4 x 6-inch howitzers
  - 20th Siege Bty – 4 x 8-inch howitzers
- 50th (SA) Brigade
  - 72nd (SA) Siege Bty – 4 x 6-inch howitzers
  - 74th (SA) Siege Bty – 4 x 6-inch howitzers
  - 75th (SA) Siege Bty – 4 x 6-inch howitzers
  - 275th Siege Bty – 6 x 8-inch howitzers

Between March and May 1918 the 6-inch howitzer batteries were brought up to a strength of six guns each after the arrival of the three reinforcing batteries (see above). When the Germans launched their Spring Offensive in March 1918, 50th (SA) Bde was sent south to reinforce Third Army fighting round Arras. 44th (SA) Brigade was very heavily engaged during the second phase of the offensive in April (the Battle of the Lys) and the gunners of 73rd (SA) Bty had to defend their guns with rifles, suffering heavy casualties. During the final Allied Hundred Days Offensive 44th (SA) Bde supported Fifth Army's advance to the Escaut Canal and 50th (SA) Bde supported First Army, including the Canadian Corps at the Second Battle of the Scarpe and the Battle of the Drocourt-Quéant Switch Line.

The South African Heavy Artillery was demobilised after the Armistice.

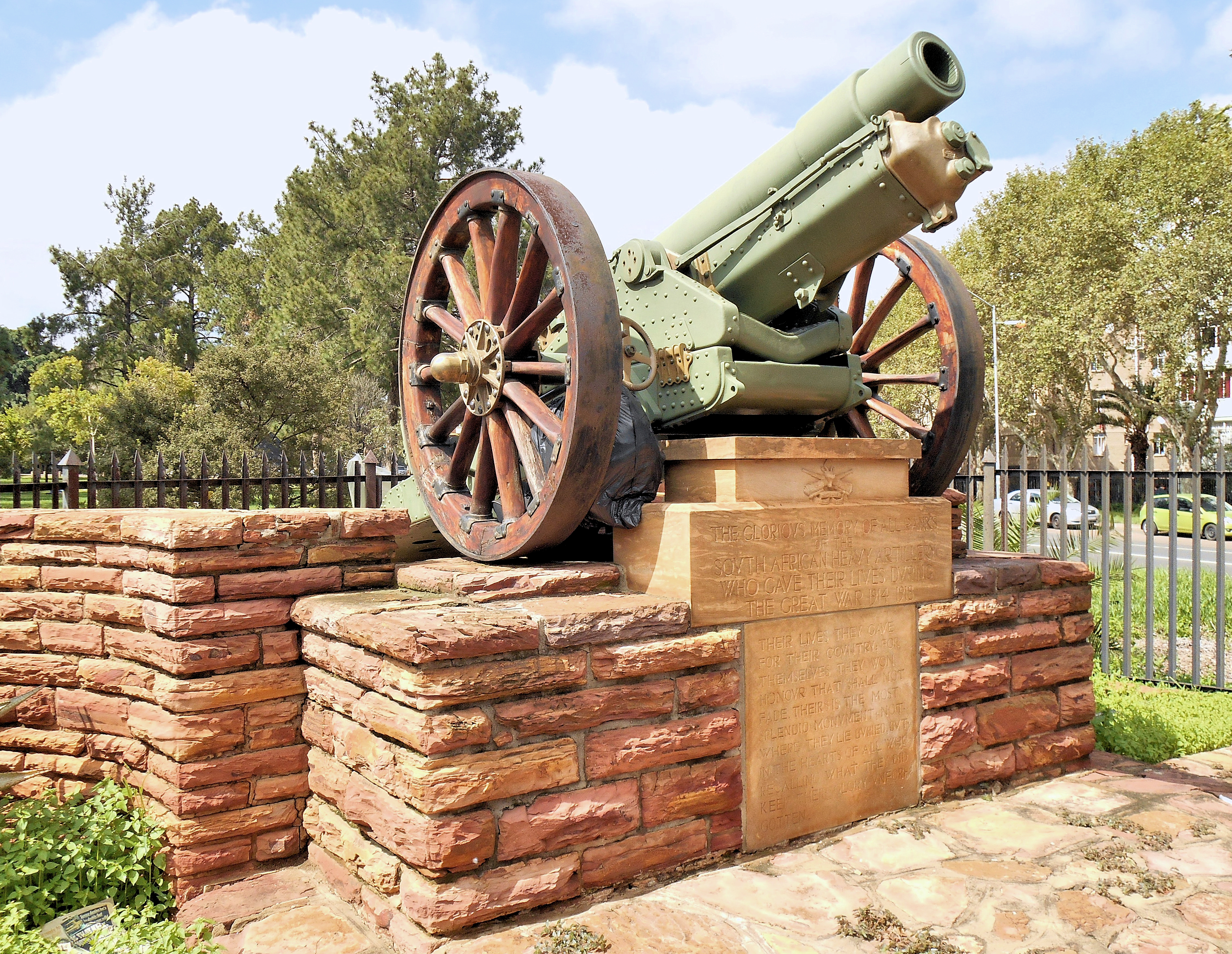
South African Heavy Artillery Memorial, Pretoria.

== Memorial ==
The South African Heavy Artillery Memorial, including 6-inch howitzers brought back from the Western Front, stands in Pretoria, another at the Johannesburg Zoo and a 3rd Gun in Port Elizabeth.

== Battle honours ==
Battle Honours
Awarded to Transvaal Horse Artillery
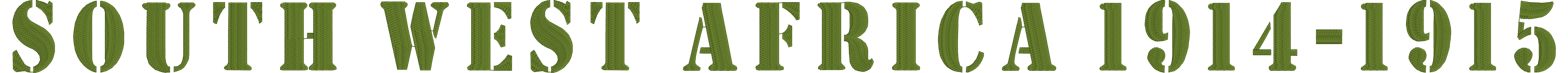
