= 47th Siege Battery, Royal Garrison Artillery =

47th Siege Battery, RGA
- Cap Badge of the Royal Regiment of Artillery
- Active: 28 July 1915 – 19 April 1919
- Country: United Kingdom
- Branch: British Army
- Role: Siege Artillery
- Part of: Royal Garrison Artillery
- Garrison/HQ: Portsmouth
- Engagements: Actions in the Ypres Salient; Battle of the Somme; Battle of Vimy Ridge; Third Battle of Ypres; German Spring Offensive; Hundred Days Offensive

47th Siege Battery was a heavy howitzer unit of Britain's Royal Garrison Artillery (RGA) in World War I, formed at Portsmouth with a nucleus of Territorial Force coastal gunners from Hampshire. It served in the Ypres Salient, on the Somme and at Vimy Ridge, before taking part in the Third Battle of Ypres. It then fought against the German Spring Offensive and participated in the final Allied Hundred Days Offensive. The battery was absorbed into the Regular Army after the war.

== Mobilisation & training ==
On the outbreak of war in August 1914, units of the part-time Territorial Force (TF) were invited to volunteer for Overseas Service and the majority of the Hampshire Royal Garrison Artillery did so. This was a 'defended ports unit' with companies stationed at the forts around Spithead and the Solent. By October 1914, the campaign on the Western Front was bogging down into Trench warfare and there was an urgent need for batteries of siege artillery to be sent to reinforce the British Expeditionary Force (BEF). The War Office decided that the TF coastal gunners were well enough trained to take over many of the duties in the coastal defences, releasing Regular Army RGA gunners for service in the field. Although complete TF defended ports units never served overseas, the companies that had volunteered for foreign service were soon supplying trained gunners to RGA units on active service and providing cadres to help form complete units.

47th Siege Battery, RGA, was formed on 28 July 1915 at Portsmouth with a nucleus from the Hampshire RGA and regular RGA gunners returned from Mauritius (No 56 Company) and Hong Kong (Nos 83, 87, 88 Companies and the Hong Kong-Singapore Royal Artillery). Together with 46th Siege Bty the battery formed a new 'L' Siege Brigade (Training) at the RGA training camp at Lydd on 30 July. The batteries training at Lydd did their field firing with 9.45-inch Skoda howitzers from the Second Boer War and 8-inch rifled muzzle-loading howitzers dating from 1879.

After training the battery moved to Horsham with 'L' Siege Bde, which was under orders to mobilise for overseas service as 36th Heavy Bde. However, the brigade's order to mobilise was rescinded. (Note: The number 36 was re-assigned to the Australian Garrison Artillery Bde; 'L' Bde (T) later mobilised as 48th Siege Bde.) Instead 47th Siege Bty went to Taunton and mobilised on 30 September with 'J' Siege Bde (T), which became 33rd Siege Bde.

== Western Front ==
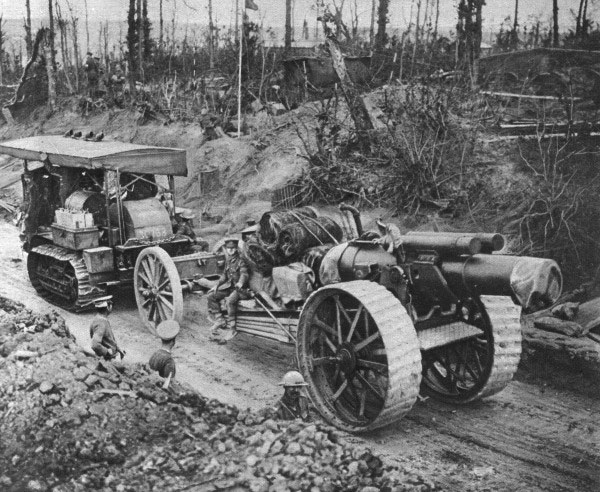
Early mark of 8-inch howitzer under tow by a Holt 75 caterpillar tractor, 1916.

47th Siege Bty embarked from Southampton on 26 November under the command of Major Robert Daubuz (who had been stationed on Gibraltar on the outbreak of war). It was equipped with four 8-inch howitzers (Note: At this stage of the war the 8-inch howitzers in use (Marks I–V) were improvised from cut-down and bored-out barrels of 6-inch coast defence guns, with the recoil checked by enormous wooden wedges.) and accompanied by its Army Service Corps mechanical transport (MT) section (2nd Section, No 593 MT Company of 33rd Bde). The battery disembarked at Boulogne on 27 November and marched across France to Belgium (delayed when one of the howitzers became ditched), arriving on 7 December at Vlamertinghe in the Ypres Salient.

=== Ypres Salient ===
At Vlamertinghe the battery joined 2nd Heavy Artillery Reserve (HAR) in V Corps Heavy Artillery (HA) under Second Army. It handed over its guns to 20th Siege Bty and then marched to a position south-east of Vlamertinghe to take over 20th Siege Bty's guns already emplaced. Right Half Bty manned 'Northern Guns' and Left Half 'Southern Guns'; each position had two Mark II 8-inch howitzers. The battery opened fire at 15.00 on 8 December, engaging various enemy trenches and strongpoints at ranges from 7,500 yards (6,900 m) to 9,860 yards (9,020 m). It fired 250 rounds in its first week in the line and then began registering its guns onto new targets with aircraft observation. It suffered its first casualties on 17 December when the billets of the South Guns section were hit by a 'Five-Nine' (150 mm) shell, wounding five men.

The battery settled into the routines of trench warfare, firing around 250 shells a week at targets around the Ypres Salient such as Hill 60, 'Stirling Castle', Hollebeke Chateau, and the Ypres–Comines canal, as well as retaliation shoots. On 14 February 1916 the battery came under the command of 5th Heavy Artillery Brigade in 2nd HAR Group. On that day the Germans attacked from the direction of Hooge Chateau: the battery brought down heavy fire on Stirling Castle and German communication trenches, but the enemy succeeded in capturing the British strongpoint known as The Bluff. Fighting continued next day, and the battery suffered a number of casualties. It continued retaliatory fire and desultory bombardment of The Bluff until 04.32 on 2 March when V Corps HA brought down a heavy bombardment to cover a surprise attack that succeeded in recapturing The Bluff. From 27 March the three guns of the battery that could be brought to bear cooperated in the fighting round the St Eloi Craters, which began with another British surprise attack launched at 04.15 without previous artillery preparation. This fighting continued until mid-April, when the line was virtually unchanged. V Corps ordered a protective barrage on its front when the Germans launched Gas attacks at Wulverghem after dark on 30 April.

From April RGA brigades were redesignated Heavy Artillery Groups (HAGs), and had no fixed organisation, batteries being attached as required. Increasingly 47th Siege Bty was used for counter-battery (CB) work, registering on known enemy batteries as well as its usual targets. On 2 June the batteries of 5th HAG were ordered to fire on Stirling Castle and Clonmel Copse as the Germans launched an attack on the Canadian Corps holding the line at Mount Sorrel. Fighting continued until 13 June and the battery was frequently called on to shell targets around Hill 60, Stirling Castle, Hooge, the canal and Armagh Wood.

=== Somme ===
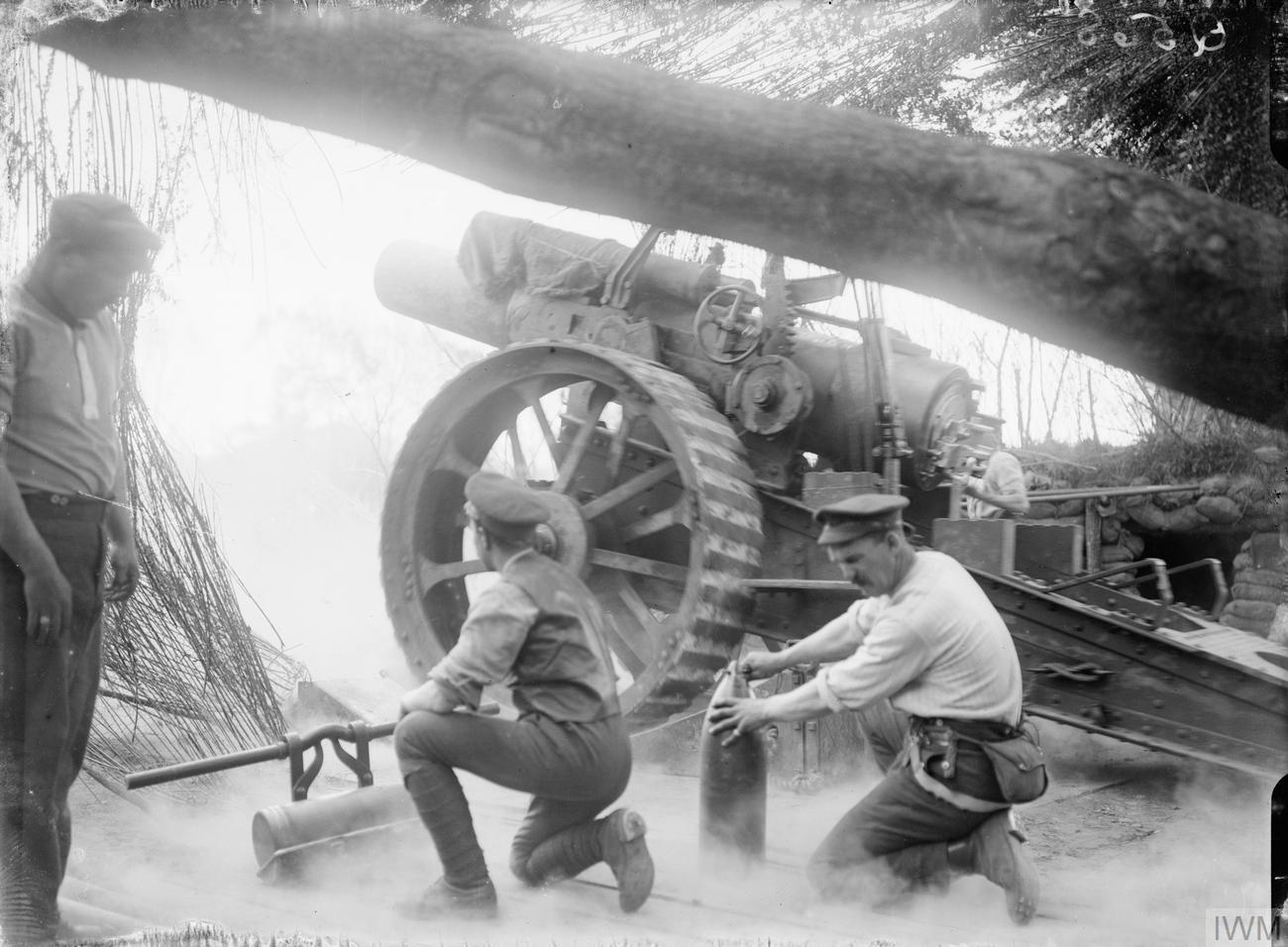
8-inch Howitzer Mk I recoiling.

On 14 June the battery paraded at Vlamertinghe and boarded a train at Godwaerswelde station bound for Fourth Army on the Somme, while the transport proceeded as a road convoy with the three serviceable guns. At Longeau the battery detrained and picked up a new (Vickers Mark VI) howitzer before marching into camp near Bray-sur-Somme on 17 June when it was attached to 14th HAG supporting XV Corps. Major Daubuz was injured in an accident, and on 20 June Maj E.D. Matthews arrived from 34th Siege Bty to take over as temporary officer commanding (OC).

Fourth Army was preparing for that summer's 'Big Push', (the Battle of the Somme). XV Corps' task was to capture the Fricourt Spur, including the villages of Fricourt and Mametz. The main bombardment was to extend over five days, U, V, W, X and Y, before the assault was launched on Z day. U Day was 24 June, but 47th Siege Bty was still registering its guns on that day. At first the new Mk VI gun (No 4) was described as 'very satisfactory', but it soon developed a series of faults and was sent to the workshop for repair. The battery joined in the bombardment on 26 June against enemy trenches north of Fricourt. Each day began with an 80-minute concentrated barrage, simulating the opening of the attack. The strenuous work of firing the heavy guns and howitzers was divided into 2-hour periods to allow the gunners to rest, forward observation officers (FOOs) to be relieved, and the guns to cool. The bombardment continued through the night, but half the guns were rested. 47th Siege Bty fired 780 rounds a day, but on several days the weather was too bad for good air or ground observation and the programme was extended by two days (Y1 and Y2), for which ammunition had to be used sparingly. The final bombardment began at 06.25 on Z Day (1 July), with 47th Siege Bty laying down a barrage on the enemy front line NW of Fricourt, then the infantry began their assault at 07.30. Two brigades of 21st Division had the task of capturing the German trenches NW of Fricourt before another brigade assaulted the village frontally. Although the Germans reported their tenches 'nearly completely destroyed', the leading battalions lost very heavily in the initial attack from a few machine gun posts that the bombardment had not hit. An hour later the supporting battalions also lost heavily crossing No man's land, but managed to push on to the Sunken Road north of Fricourt, gaining some of the 1st Objective. XV Corps' HA had been ordered to advance the barrage in a series of 'lifts', but the sixth lift onto Fricourt village was postponed until 14.30 and when the follow-up attack went in it met with disaster. However, that night the Germans abandoned Fricourt, which was threatened by the British advances to the north and south (where 7th Division had captured Mametz).

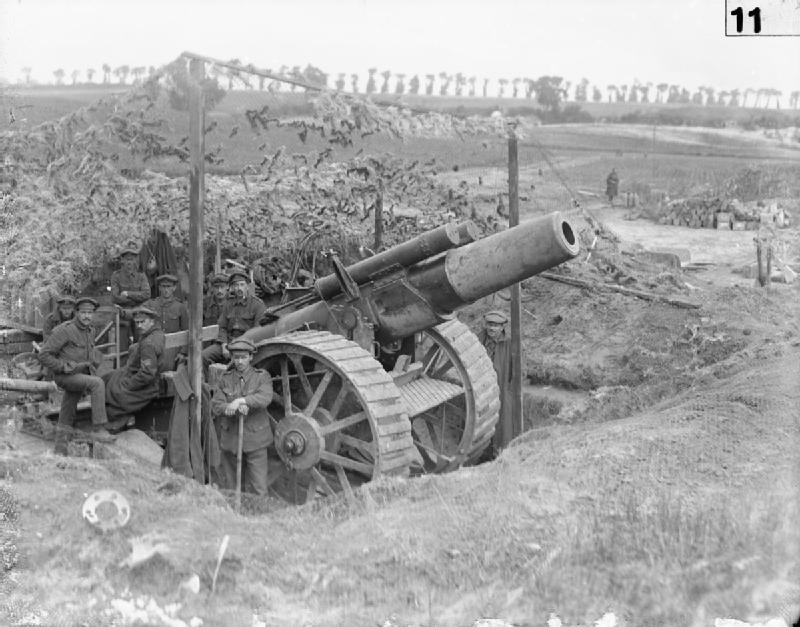
8-inch Howitzer Mk I on the Somme, July 1916.

Over the following days the battery fired a few bursts on Fricourt Wood, Bazentin le Grand and Mametz Wood, but had another gun condemned as worn out. On 9 July it moved its two serviceable guns forward close to Mametz, bringing up a new Mk V gun later. From here it registered on the German second position between Bazentin and Longueval. At 03.20 on 14 July it joined in the hurricane bombardment accompanying a surprise pre-dawn attack (the Battle of Bazentin Ridge). After that success it fired on Switch Trench and the village of Flers as XV Corps attacked High Wood and fought its way into Longueval (29 July).

Major H.A. Ramsay had been named to take over as OC of the battery on 6 July; he arrived from 14th HAG HQ on 1 August when Maj Matthews moved to 10th Siege Bty. On 1 August the battery began registering two guns on Ginchy Church. Next day Left Section (around 70 men with two guns) arrived from 126th Siege Bty, which had landed in France on 25 July. This allowed a similar number of 47th Siege Bty's gunners to be rested until 15 August. The combined four guns (the recently arrived Mk V was also condemned and had to be replaced) bombarded Ginchy for several days as the fighting continued round Delville Wood and then switched to the nearby Ale Alley, Beer Trench and Vat Alley (Beer Trench was reported 'nearly obliterated' when it was captured on 18 August). Fourth Army finally captured Guillemont and Ginchy in early September.

47th Siege Bty now reorganised its worn-out guns, taking over two with Left Section of the recently arrived 135th Siege Bty and exchanging an old Mk V for a new Mk VI from 126th Siege Bty. Still the offensive continued. On 13 September the battery began registering Flers and Gueudecourt, together with Pint Trench and Tea Support Trench for the Battle of Flers–Courcelette beginning two days later, in which XV Corps took Flers, and then bombarded Gueudecourt and Gird Trench until they were captured on 26 September during the Battle of Morval. Goat Trench was the next target, but on 28 September the battery began digging new forward positions near Longueval for two Mk VI howitzers while 135th Siege Bty left with the Mk Vs. In early October 47th Siege Bty brought up a third Mk VI howitzer and battered Ligny-Thilloy and Bayonet and Barley Trenches. XV Corps' participation in the Somme offensive died down after the Battle of the Transloy Ridges (1–18 October), but the guns continued firing for the rest of the year, and the battery continued to suffer a trickle of casualties. Major Ramsay was sent away on 21 October and Capt R.V.M. Garry arrived as replacement OC on 27 October, later being promoted to Acting Major.

=== Vimy Ridge ===
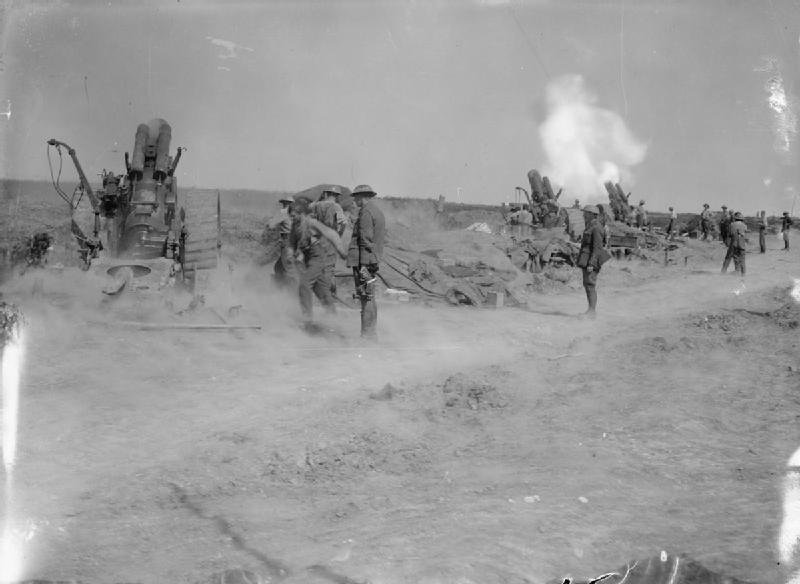
8-inch Mk V howitzers of 135th Siege Bty in action.

47th Siege Bty was taken out of the line and rested from 27 December to 19 January 1917. It then returned to positions at Ginchy and resumed desultory fire on the enemy. However, on 3 February it was pulled out again and moved north to Marœuil near Arras, where it joined 50th (South African) HAG with First Army on 11 February. It dug new positions and began registering its three guns on Thélus Mill. On 20 February 47th Siege Bty was taken over by 13th HAG, which had just moved into the area.

First Army was preparing for the Arras Offensive, with 13th HAG supporting Canadian Corps. For the next few weeks 47th Siege Bty fired on trench junctions and identified machine gun emplacements, especially around Zwischen-Stellung and Prinz Arnulf Graben trenches and Thélus Mill. It also carried out harassing fire (HF) tasks at night. The attack went in at 05.30 on 9 April with a heavy barrage in which 47th Siege Bty participated. Within five rounds of opening fire the battery received a salvo of enemy shells, which did no damage. The barrage then lifted five times during the day, successively from the three lines of German trenches onto Thélus, Farbus and then Vimy villages. The Canadians overran all three trench lines and seized the crest of the ridge where the battery soon established its observation post (OP). Firing continued over subsequent days as the Canadians consolidated the captured ground and carried out a limited exploitation. 47th Siege Bty ceased fire on 13 April when Vimy village was taken.

47th Siege Bty was then in reserve, awaiting orders for a move. These came on 24 April when it moved into a new position at Nine Elms near Thélus. On 26 April it began shelling Arleux-en-Gohelle in preparation for the Battle of Arleux on 28 April. The Canadian Corps' capture of the village was the only tangible success of the day's fighting. 47th Sige Bty now lengthened the range and began bombarding Acheville for the Third Battle of the Scarpe. This was launched on 3 May and the Canadians captured the front trench along the Fresnoy–Acheville Road and then Fresnoy village, the only bright spot in an otherwise disastrous day. On 5 May 47th Siege Bty two guns forward to new gun pits in a sunken road near Thélus and began firing on Méricourt. Shelling went on for a few more days, as German counter-attacks retook Fresnoy, but the Arras Offensive on First Army's front was over.

=== Third Ypres ===
On 14 May the Right Section of 47th Siege Bty pulled out to move north to join X Corps with Second Army at Ypres, though Left Section remained in place, still firing, until 20 May. The battery came under 30th HAG on 18 May and Right Section established itself at 'Moat Farm' on the Oudredam–Kruisstraate road south-west of Ypres (although it was shelled out of position, with a number of casualties, on 23 May, moving to a sunken road nearby). As the guns arrived they were registered on 'White Chateau', east of Ypres.

Policy in the BEF was now to increase batteries to six guns where possible, and on 4 June 47th Siege Bty was reinforced by a section of 340th Siege Bty. This battery had been formed at Crownhill Fort, Plymouth, on 6 January 1917. The battery's personnel went out to the Western Front on 29 May 1917 and joined X Corps HA on 4 June. On arrival the battery had been immediately split up, with one section posted to 47th Siege Bty, the other to 221st Siege Bty. Fifth Army took over part of the line after the completion of the Battle of Messines and the artillery was reorganised: 47th Siege Bty came under 6th HAG with II Corps on 16 June. On 20 June it began moving out of its positions in the sunken road, where it had been under continuous shellfire. The battery began digging new positions between Voormezeele and Elzenwalle, where the two additional guns for its new section were received on 23 June.

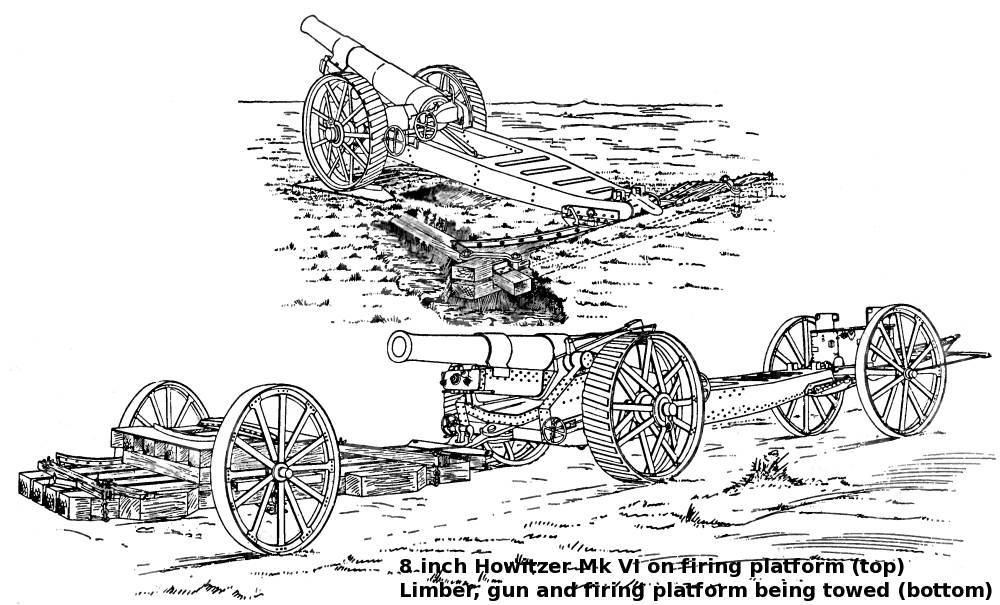
Vickers 8-inch howitzer Mk VI and platform.

Fifth Army was preparing for that summer's Third Ypres Offensive, and at the time the policy of II Corps was to leave the enemy alone apart from retaliation shoots. From the end of the month 47th Siege Bty joined in shoots on hostile batteries and concentrations on Kortewilde and Zandvoorde. During July the tempo increased, with wire-cutting and counter-battery (CB) tasks, though the weather was often too poor for ground or air observation. The preparatory bombardment officially began on 16 July and built up for the rest of the month, with increasingly heavy CB bombardments and practice barrages. The attack went in on 31 July (the Battle of Pilckem Ridge). As the infantry of 73rd Brigade (24th Division) followed the Creeping barrage through Shrewsbury Forest they were followed in turn by a joint FOO party from 47th and 162nd Siege Btys, paying out a telephone line as they went. The party reached Lower Star Post where they were being sniped from all sides, so they started back. One of the telephonists was hit and the others dragged him into a shell hole while fetching a stretcher party. Another man was wounded while they carried the stretcher back to a dressing station. The FOO got back the information that pillboxes at Lower Star Post were holding up the advance, the 2nd Battalion Leinster Regiment having gone to the left and the 7th Bn Northamptonshire Regiment to the right. The FOO party was then established with the infantry brigade HQ at Larch Wood, from where they sent back observations to 6th HAG for the rest of the day. Although 24th Division had reached the Blue Line (1st Objective) it had been forced to consolidate there, and had not reached the Black Line (2nd Objective) as at first believed. II Corps had failed to capture the Gheluvelt plateau as intended. Meanwhile, back at 47th Siege Bty's gun positions, the ammunition in No 6 gun pit had been hit by en enemy gas shell, resulting in a number of killed and wounded. During the day the battery fired 885 rounds in the various barrages and 79 on SOS tasks, followed by another 100 on night HF lines.

Rain set in that afternoon and it was not until 10 August that Fifth Army was able to resume the offensive, with II Corps attacking Westhoek, Glencorse Wood and Inverness Copse on the Gheluvelt plateau. 47th Siege Bty suffered casualties in the preceding exchanges of fire with the mass of German batteries behind the plateau, and then took part in the barrage for the attack. Although the infantry followed the barrage, they were unable to hold most of the ground captured. Rain then returned, making it difficult to bring up ammunition. On 16 August the batteries of 6th HAG supported the attack by 56th (1st London) Division (part of the Battle of Langemarck), which was halted by machine guns in Glencorse Wood and Inverness Copse and by the unsuppressed German artillery. There was further fighting along the Menin Road on 22–23 August as II Corps used 14th (Light) Division in another attempt to clear Inverness Copse, which was seen as vital for the whole campaign, but the infantry were driven out by a German counter-attack on 24 August, amidst accusations that the protective barrage was coming down on the defenders.

The failure to take the Gheluvelt Plateau led to a three-week pause in operations and a reorganisation, with Second Army resuming control of the sector. The new attack plan emphasised artillery preparation, with concentrated observed fire on strongpoints, batteries and counter-attack formations. Large amounts of ammunition were brought up. 6th HAG was joined by 54th HAG as 'Left Double Group' supporting X Corps. There was little firing in early September, but from 10 September 47th Siege Bty was engaged in daily shoots, with observation by aircraft or Kite balloons when weather permitted, and from 15 September practice barrages were carried out twice each day. The attack on the Gheluvelt Plateau by 23rd Division on 20 September during the Battle of the Menin Road Ridge was successful because the objectives were limited and the heavy artillery support was overwhelming. 47th Siege Bty fired 1480 rounds on barrages and a further 127 responding to SOS calls, at the end of which No 6 gun was taken out of action as worn out. Over following days the battery provided protective barrages as the infantry consolidated their gains, and the gunners prepared new positions further forward at Verbrandenmolen. From 22 September 6th HAG's batteries concentrated on Gheluvelt to prepare for the attack planned for 26 September (the Battle of Polygon Wood), but came under CB fire, and 47th Siege Bty was shelled out of the Verbrandenmolen position, with two guns damaged. The battery pulled them back to the original position and mounted one gun on the undamaged carriage of the other to make one good gun. On 24 September it got four guns into a different position at Verbrandenmolen, but when it began registering them on Gheluvelt Mill next morning it was caught by CB fire as the Germans put in a spoiling attack between the Menin Road and Polygon Wood. It suffered a number of casualties but Second Army's attack still went in as scheduled at 05.50 on 26 September. 47th Siege Bty fired in the barrage as the infantry took all their objectives, and on SOS tasks when the German counter-attacks were crushed by the massed artillery. It got its fifth gun into position at the end of the day.

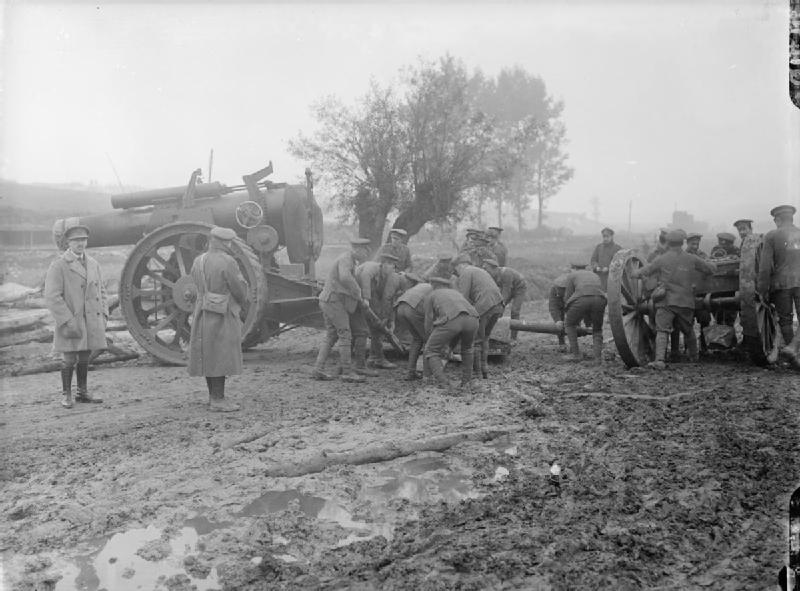
Hauling an 8-inch howitzer into position.

In the days after the attack 47th Siege Bty provided protective barrages, but suffered more casualties from shellfire. Second Army repeated its successful formula with partially successful attacks on 4 October (the Battle of Broodseinde, 6th HAG supporting 5th Division) and 9 October (the Battle of Poelcappelle, when the infantry in front of 6th HAG failed to take Polderhoek Chateau). X Corps carried out a feint attack with full artillery support when the neighbouring II ANZAC Corps attacked on 12 October at the First Battle of Passchendaele. By now the tables were turned: British batteries were clearly observable from the Passchendaele Ridge and were subjected to hostile CB fire, while their own guns sank into the mud and became difficult to move and fire. 6th HAG was now concentrated round Zillebeke Lake. (Note: By now 47th Siege Bty was equipped with six Mk VII 8-inch howitzers.) From 13 October each divisional front was only covered by 10 howitzers and 10 heavy guns to allow the RGA gunners some rest. Those guns still operating fired at Polderhoek and Gheluvelt Chateau in preparation for the Second Battle of Passchendaele starting on 26 October, but when 7th Division attacked they suffered heavy casualties and made no lasting gains. X Corps' guns continued to put down barrages on the Menin Road, but these were only diversions while the fighting continued elsewhere. Meanwhile 47th Siege Bty was bombed by German aircraft on 29 October, losing four killed and seven wounded, including the OC, Maj Garry, and had further casualties from shellfire next day.

=== Winter 1917–18 ===
47th Siege Bty was finally pulled out on 9 November and went for rest and training with 66th HAG at Clairmarais near Saint-Omer until 3 December. It then returned to the line in the Cambrai sector, rejoining 5th HAG on 4 December.

By now HAG allocations were becoming more fixed, and during December they were converted into permanent RGA brigades once more. From 27 December 1917 for the rest of the war the battery was the heavy element in 5th (8-inch Howitzer) Brigade, RGA, along with three 6-inch howitzer batteries.

47th Siege Bty was deployed with its Right Half at Saint-Emilie and Left Half at Villers-Faucon. 5th Brigade was firing on Villers-Guislain, an outpost of the Hindenburg Line, with Right Half on specific map references (batteries, working parties etc.) mainly with aircraft observation or Sound ranging, while Left Half concentrated on the Beet Factory and Eagle Quarry. At the end of February 5 Bde was withdrawn into GHQ Reserve, moving by road (except 47th Siege Bty by train) to Maricourt where the brigade rested in camp. It then moved (47th Siege Bty by train) to Péronne.

=== Spring Offensive ===
The Germans launched their Spring Offensive against Fifth Army on 21 March and at 17.30 5th Bde was sent up to reinforce VII Corps. The guns went into position at Aizecourt-le-Haut to defend the partially-dug 'Green Line', bringing up ammunition from the dump at Nurlu, which was already under shellfire. The batteries came into action at 10.00 next morning. The enemy were advancing rapidly but the batteries were ordered not to withdraw until the retreating British troops actually fell back to the gun pits (an order that was subsequently cancelled). The gun positions were shelled that night, with 47th Siege Bty losing some of its ammunition and suffering some wounded. Early on 23 March the brigade was ordered back to Cléry (except 47th Siege Bty sent further back to Bray-sur-Somme) under the orders of 39th Division, which had also joined the corps from GHQ Reserve and had covered the retirement to the Green Line. The brigade was then withdrawn north over the Somme, and moved back progressively through a number of firing positions across the old Somme battlefield. The retreat ended on 27 March for 47th Siege Bty, which took up positions at Bresle, west of Albert. Although Albert had fallen to the enemy, VII Corps (now under Third Army) was holding the line of the River Ancre and the German advance had been stopped. Unlike some others, 5th Bde had got back without losing a gun.

The Germans resumed the offensive with the Battle of the Ancre, and shelled the whole of the Bresle valley all day, but although the batteries suffered come casualties they remained in action throughout, and the attackers were mown down by artillery and machine guns. The Germans were unable to attack again in this sector. VII Corps HQ was relieved next day, and 5th Bde came under Australian Corps' HA in Fourth Army. The batteries settled down to improving their positions and routine HF and CB tasks, with occasional concentrations on the village of Morlancourt with its converging roads. On 24–25 April the Germans attacked the Australian positions south of the Somme (the Second Battle of Villers-Bretonneux). The German artillery preparation at 03.45 once again included the Bresle Valley to the north, the battery positions being shelled with high explosive and gas. 5th Brigade's batteries immediately replied with their counter-preparation tasks, and kept up HF throughout both days. Again the Germans failed to break through, and were fiercely counter-attacked.

5th Brigade were relieved on 3 May and withdrew into reserve positions around Pont-Noyelles. Here the batteries prepared gun pits and OPs in case of a resumption of the German offensive, but the fighting had moved to other sectors. On 23 May the brigade returned to the line, now around Franvillers, and resumed HF shoots on Morlancourt and enemy trenches. The brigade was relieved on 14 May and moved to Bussy, where it carried out precise CB shoots with aircraft and balloon observation. On 4 July the Australians launched a limited attack, the Battle of Hamel; 5th Bde's supporting CB shoots were very effective, with hardly a shell coming back from the enemy. This work continued throughout July, on one occasion 47th Siege Bty using its 8-inch shells to suppress anti-aircraft batteries troubling the observation aircraft. On 29 July the battery fired in support of a raid by 5th Australian Division near Morlancourt.

=== Hundred Days Offensive ===
The Allies launched their Hundred Days Offensive with the Battle of Amiens on 8 August. There was no preliminary bombardment and the barrage came down as a surprise at H Hour (04.20); the Australians were on their first objectives 2 miles (3.2 km) away by 07.00. Already the Germans had retreated out of range of some of 5th Bde's 6-inch batteries, which began to follow up as quickly as the damaged roads would allow. 47th Siege Bty's longer-range 8-inch howitzers continued to pound the enemy batteries. Next morning the brigade shelled the exits from Proyart as the Australians swept up to the village. The gunners of 47th Siege Bty got a captured battery of 'Five-Nine' (5.9-inch or 15 cm) howitzers (Note: Probably 15 cm sFH 13s.) into action against the retreating Germans. The whole brigade ceased fire on 10 August, when patrols showed that the Germans had retreated out of range. The 6-inch batteries, together with 47th's 5.9s, were moved up and came back into action on 12 August with harassing fire on roads and suspected battery positions. Next day, 47th Siege Bty got two captured '8-inch' (21 cm) howitzers into action as well. (Note: Probably 21 cm Mörser 16s.) However, the impetus had gone out of Fourth Army's offensive, and the line solidified. 5th Brigade's batteries reverted to static CB and HF tasks.

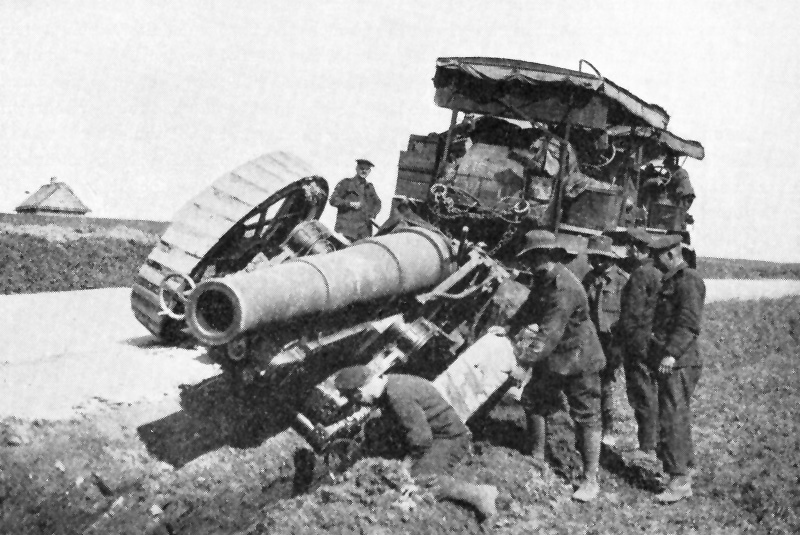
An 8-inch howitzer Mk VI ditched while under tow.

The advance was resumed with the Battle of Albert on 21 August. On 23 August 5th Bde supported an attack by Australian Corps either side of the Somme. Zero hour was 04.45 and from Corbie 47th Siege Bty shelled its bombardment targets with a mixture of 8-inch and captured 15 cm and 21 cm howitzers. By 19.00 each of the batteries had been ordered to send a section forward, and these were reported 'in action' by midnight, ready for the resumption of the advance at 01.00. The other two sections of 47th Siege Bty came straight up next morning, leaving its positions to be used as the brigade lorry park. By evening on 27 August the infantry patrols were so far forward that most of the brigade's gun were out of range again: 47th Siege Bty's longest-range gun had to cease fire next morning. The batteries now moved up behind the advancing infantry (47th Siege Bty bringing up its captured howitzers) until they got back in range for CB tasks against the German batteries that were still fairly active. 5th Brigade was now operating in close liaison with 15th Australian Infantry Bde, which forced a crossing of the Somme at Brie on 30 August. The Australians liberated Péronne on 1 September and the advance continued under conditions of open warfare.

The Germans were now falling back on the Hindenburg Line, the penetration of which would entail another set-piece operation. 5th Brigade spent several days parked, with 47th Siege Bty's guns alongside the road at Mons-en-Chaussée. They moved into new positions on 13 September with some difficulty due to rain. The 5th was now designated as a 'bombardment brigade' for the forthcoming operations. The Australians attacked the Hindenburg outposts at the Battle of Épehy at 05.20 on 18 September, advancing so rapidly that 47th Siege Bty was out of range by 09.40. The battery moved forward into a 'silent' position on the night of 19/20 September for the next phase, for which 5th Bde was transferred to IX Corps' HA. The 'silent' guns were registered, and on 27 September 47th Siege Bty opened up for two days of intense HF and CB before the assault crossing of the St Quentin Canal on 29 September. 46th (North Midland) Division, which had to storm the canal itself, had the heaviest level of artillery support of any British division in the war. The attack was a smashing success: 46th (NM) Division swarmed over the canal across captured bridges and dams, using lifebelts and planks, and took its final objectives before nightfall. That afternoon 5th Bde fired concentrations on Thorigny (near Lehaucourt) supporting 1st Division's successful follow-up attack.

47th Siege Bty fired in support of the subsequent attacks on the Beaurevoir Line (3–4 October), and was then sent off independently to provide fire support for French troops operating at Flatiron Wood on 5–6 October. The brigade fired during the Second Battle of Cambrai (8–9 October), after which its guns were out of range and it went into GHQ Reserve at Tincourt. On 14 October it moved to Mesnil, expecting to move to another corps, but was not used for the rest of the month. Finally, on 31 October it was ordered to the Banteux–Bantouzelle area to join IV Corps in Third Army.

IV Corps was preparing for the Battle of the Sambre. 47th Siege Bty moved four guns up to forward positions the night before the attack on 4 November. 5th Brigade then took part in a complex fire programme to assist 37th Division and the New Zealand Division in capturing the old fortress of Le Quesnoy. Third Army had advanced beyond its objectives and by next morning the enemy had retreated out of range once more. Although the brigade reconnoitred the road ahead through the Forêt de Mormal, the pursuit was now so fast that the heavy artillery was left behind. Hostilities ended on 11 November when the Armistice with Germany took effect.

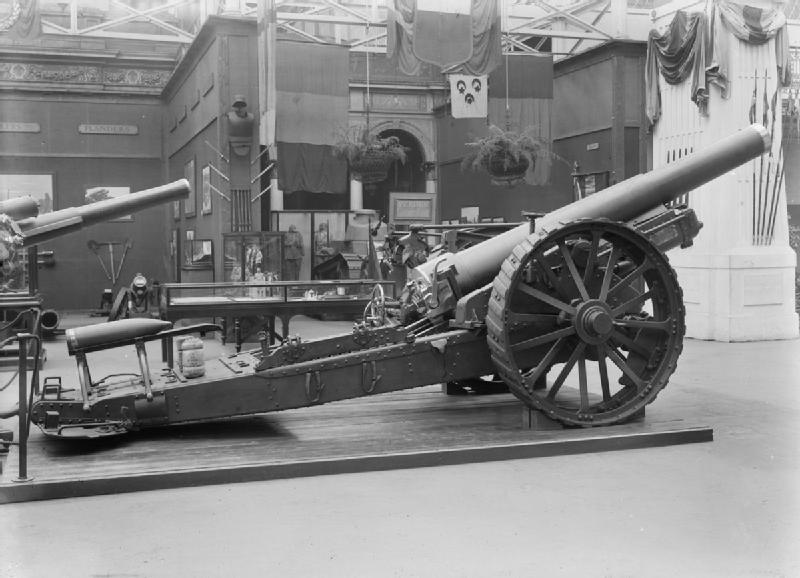
A Mark VII 8-inch howitzer displayed after the war at The Crystal Palace.

The Commonwealth War Graves Commission lists 38 names of members of the battery who died during the war, but others may have been listed simply as 'RGA'.

== Postwar ==
After the Armistice, 5th Bde was concentrated in billets in Neuville and then moved back to Bertangles, near Arras, where it was billeted for the winter. Demobilisation got under way early in 1919 and units were progressively reduced to cadre strength and shipped back to the UK. By 19 April 1919 47th Siege Bty was at Newtownards in County Down when it was joined by the cadre of 46th Siege Bty. Together they formed a new 46th Bty, RGA, in the Regular Army. The new battery, part of 12th Brigade at Dundalk, was held to reconstitute the prewar No 17 Company RGA. The battery later became 19th Medium Battery and served until 1943.
