= 1st Hampshire Artillery Volunteers =

1st Hampshire Artillery Volunteers; Hampshire Royal Garrison Artillery; 527th (Hampshire) Coast Regiment, RA; 406th (Hampshire) Coast Regiment, RA
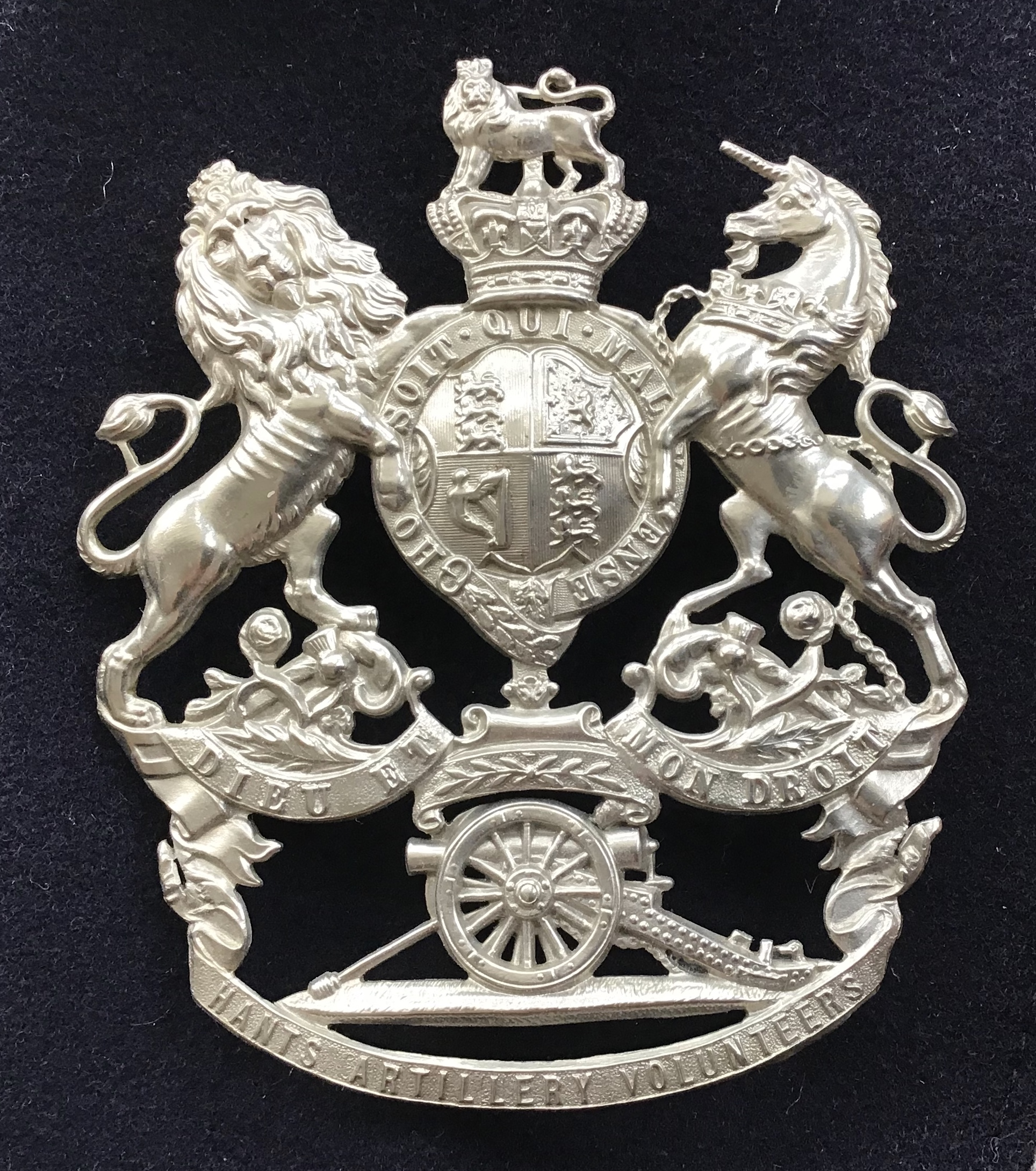
- Helmet Plate, Hampshire Artillery Volunteers, c1890
- Active: 1860 to 1967
- Country: United Kingdom
- Branch: (United Kingdom) Territorial Army
- Type: Artillery Corps
- Role: Garrison Artillery; Coast Artillery
- Part of: Southern Coast Defences
- Garrison/HQ: Southampton

The 1st Hampshire Artillery Volunteers and its successors were part-time coast defence units of the British Army from 1860 to 1967. Although the units saw no action, they protected the Portsmouth area in both World Wars and supplied trained gunners to siege batteries engaged on the Western Front during World War I. The unit continued in the Territorial Army after World War II.

== Volunteer Force ==
The enthusiasm for the Volunteer movement following an invasion scare in 1859 saw the creation of many Rifle and Artillery Volunteer Corps composed of part-time soldiers eager to supplement the Regular British Army in time of need. Three Artillery Volunteer Corps (AVCs) were quickly formed in Hampshire, and on 1 January 1861 they were combined into the 1st Administrative Brigade, Hampshire AVCs under the command of Lieutenant-Colonel Alfred B. Sturdee, with its headquarters (HQ) at Portsmouth:

- 1st (Southampton) Hampshire AVC, formed at Gosport on 25 April 1860, moved to Bitterne near Southampton in May 1860; formed a second battery on 21 August 1861 and later two others; moved into Southampton in 1873.
- 2nd (Southsea) Hampshire AVC, formed at Southsea, near Portsmouth, on 9 May 1860; initially listed as the 3rd, it became the 2nd in June that year; formed a second battery 20 July 1860, a third 24 May 1861, a fourth by January 1864 and two others 15 September 1865; amalgamated with 3rd in 1871 when the HQ moved to Portsmouth
- 3rd (Portsmouth Dockyard) Hampshire AVC, formed at Portsmouth on 18 August 1860; formed three more batteries 5 September, a fifth by 14 September 1860, and a sixth later; HQ moved into Portsmouth Dockyard from March 1862; amalgamated with 2nd in 1871

In November 1863, the 1st, 3rd and 4th Dorsetshire AVCs (the 2nd having been disbanded in 1861) joined the 1st Hampshire Admin Brigade, staying until 1866 when they were transferred to the 1st Devonshire Admin Brigade. A new 4th Hampshire AVC was formed at Bournemouth on 29 November 1866 (a 5th (Dockyard) Hampshire AVC may have been formed on 18 August 1860, but had quickly been disbanded). The Dorsetshire AVCs rejoined the 1st Hampshire Admin Bde from January 1873, by which time the 5th and 6th Dorsetshire AVCs had been formed, although the 3rd Dorsetshire was disbanded in 1876.

The Volunteers were consolidated in March 1880, with the Admin Brigade becoming the 1st Hampshire (Hants & Dorset) AVC of 18 batteries, with HQ at Portsmouth:

Band of the Bournemouth Artillery Volunteers, c1900

- Nos 1–4 Batteries at Southampton (former 1st Hampshire AVC)
- Nos 5–12 Batteries at Portsmouth (former 2nd Hampshire AVC)
- No 13–14 Batteries at Bournemouth (former 4th Hampshire AVC)
- No 15 Battery at Lyme Regis (former 1st Dorset AVC)
- No 16 Battery at Portland (former 4th Dorset AVC)
- No 17 Battery at Portland and Swanage (former 4th and 6th Dorset AVCs)
- No 18 Battery at Charmouth (former 5th Dorset AVC)

In 1882, all the artillery volunteers were affiliated to one or other of the territorial garrison divisions of the Royal Artillery (RA) and the 1st Hampshire AVC became the 1st Volunteer (Hampshire) Brigade of the Southern Division, with HQ moving to Southsea. In 1886, the Dorset companies were separated to form an independent 1st Dorsetshire AVC as the 2nd Volunteer Brigade of the Southern Division, and on 25 April 1888 the Southampton companies were withdrawn to form the 3rd Volunteer (Hampshire) Brigade, Southern Division. Finally, the Hampshire brigades were renumbered in December 1889, the 3rd (descended from the original 1st AVC) becoming the 1st Hampshire AVC at Southampton and the 1st (from the original 2nd and 3rd) becoming the 2nd Hampshire AVC at Portsmouth. The 1st Hampshire AVC opened its drill hall in St Mary's Road, Southampton, in 1889. By 1893 the War Office Mobilisation Scheme had allocated the 1st Hampshire Artillery Volunteers to the Portsmouth fixed defences.

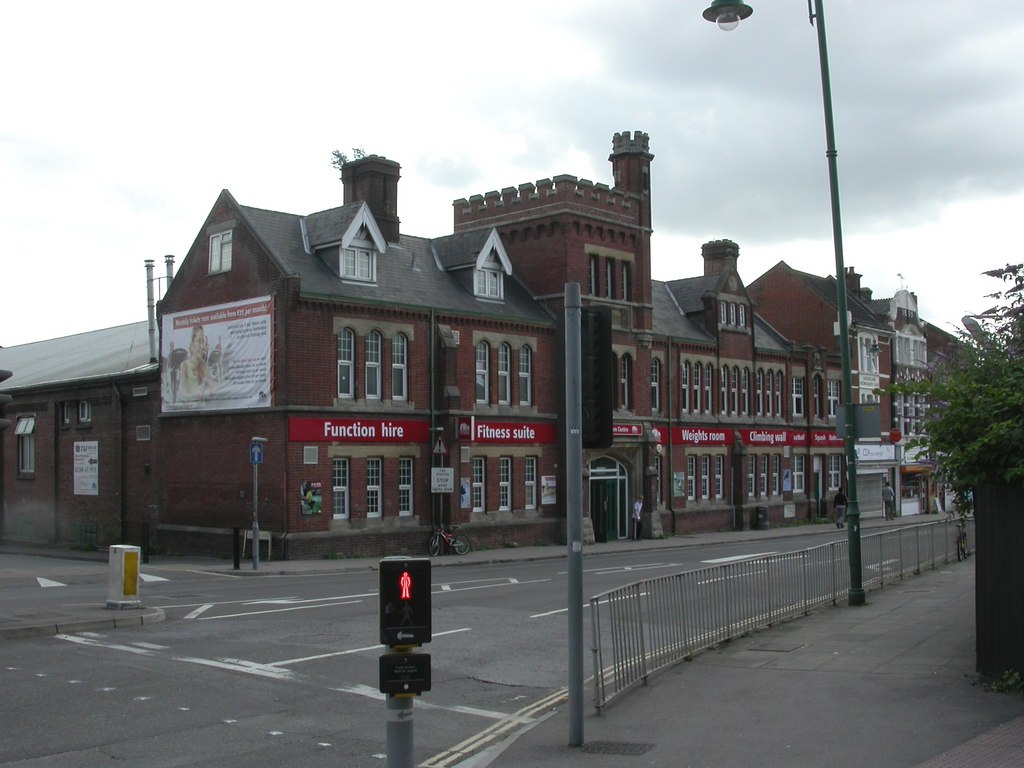
St Mary's Road drill hall, now a leisure centre.

By 1894, the unit was organised as follows:

- HQ at Southampton
- Nos 1–4, 7 and half 8 Companies at Southampton
- No 5 Company at Shirley, Southampton
- No 6 Company at Bitterne
- Half of No 8 Company at Woolston, Southampton
- Nos 9–10 Companies at Eastleigh

In 1899, the RA was divided into separate field and garrison branches, and the artillery volunteers were all assigned to the Royal Garrison Artillery (RGA). In 1902 the divisional structure was abolished and the unit titles were changed, the 1st Hampshire AVC becoming the 1st Hampshire Royal Garrison Artillery (Volunteers), with its HQ at St Mary's Road.

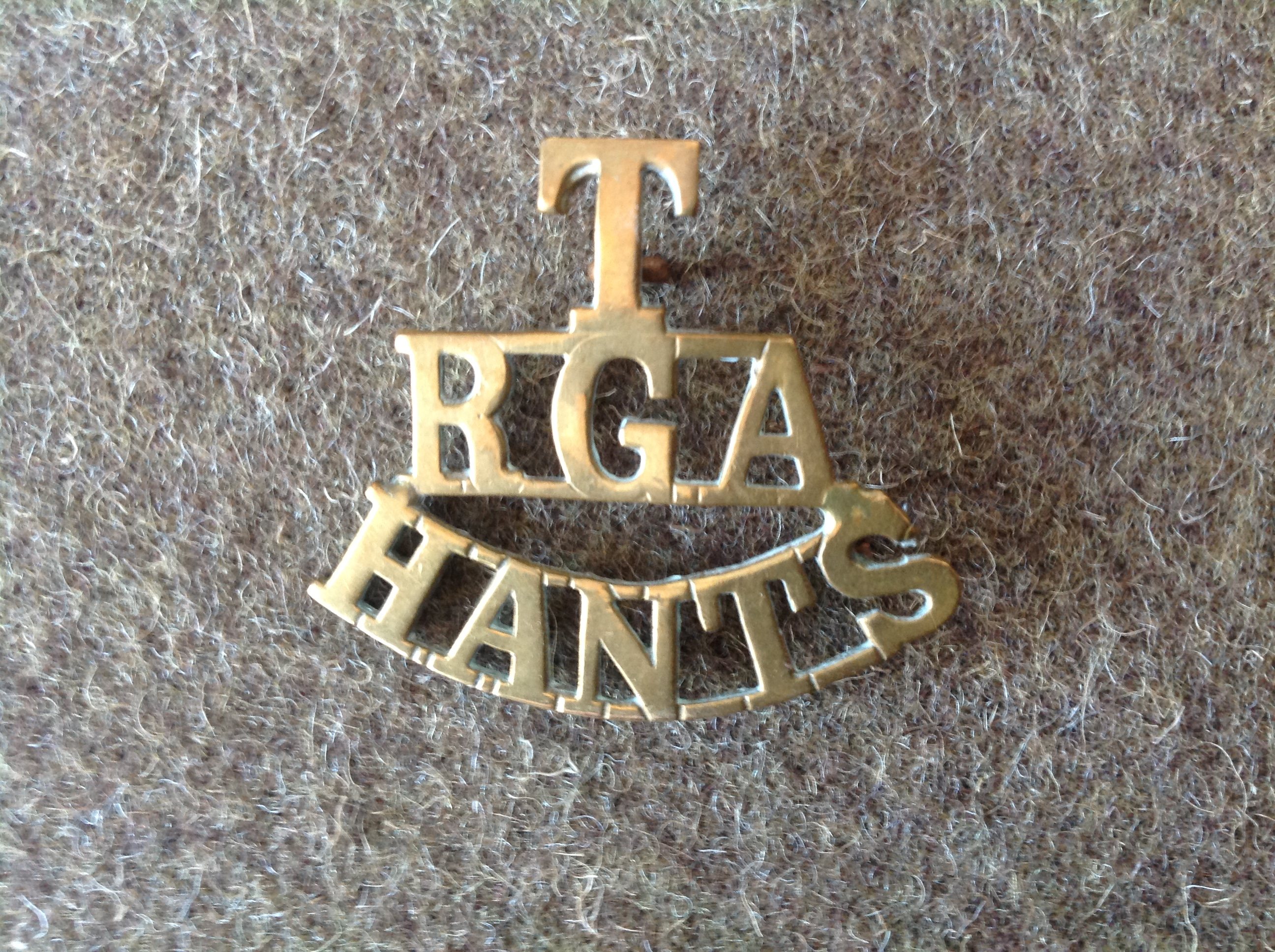
Unit shoulder title.

== Territorial Force ==
When the Territorial Force (TF) was created from the old Volunteer Force under the Haldane Reforms of 1908, the 1st Hampshire RGA (V) was to join with the Dorsetshire RGA (V) once again to become the Hants & Dorset RGA, but this was changed back to separate Dorset and Hampshire units in 1910. The Hampshire RGA had the following organisation:

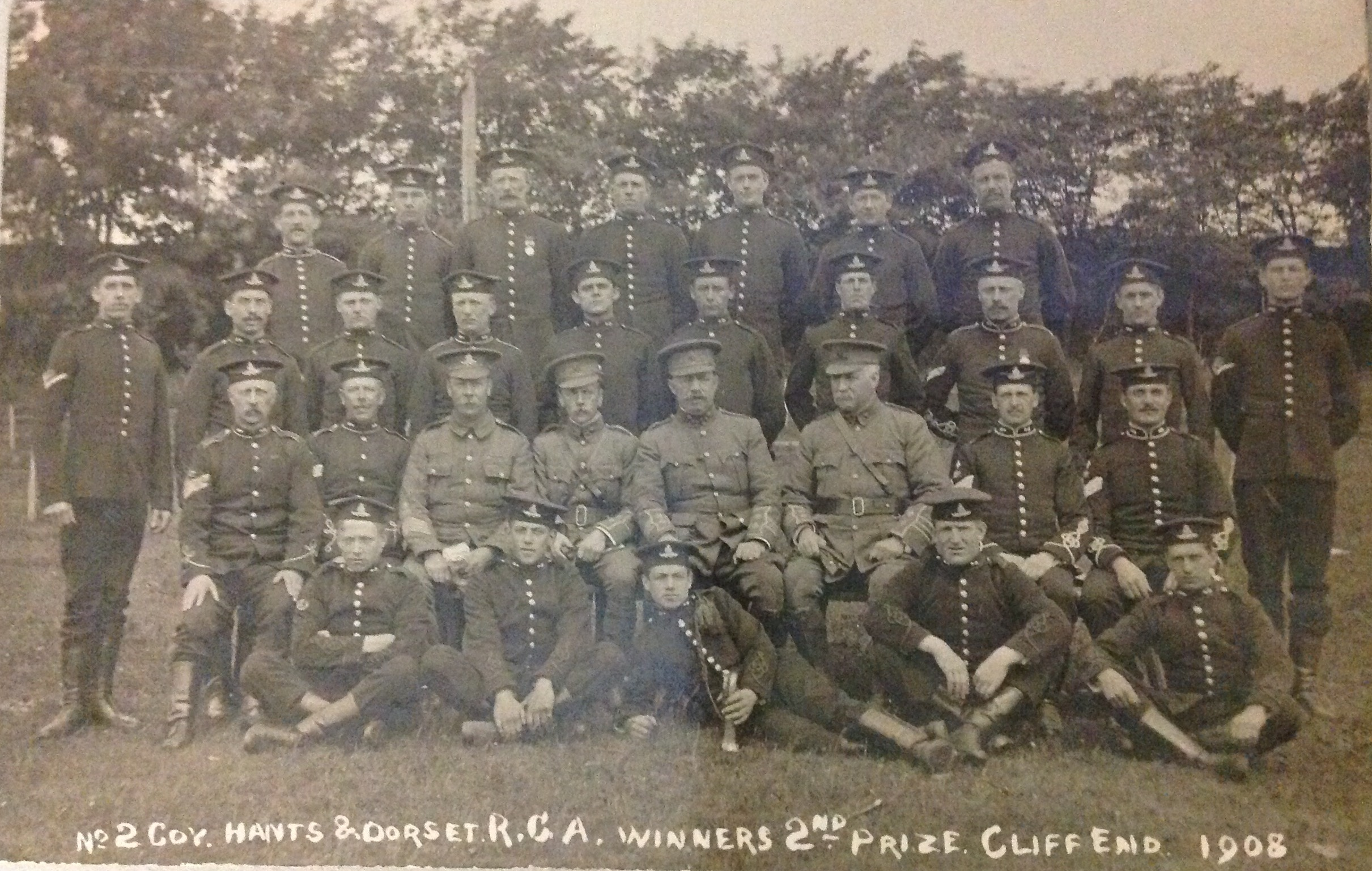
No 2 Company, Hants & Dorset RGA, 1908.

- HQ at St Mary's Road, Southampton
- No 1 Heavy Battery at Southampton
- No 2 Company at Southampton
- No 3 Company at Eastleigh
- No 4 Company at Governor's Green, Portsmouth
- No 5 Company at Southampton
- No 6 Company at Woolston, and High Street, Bitterne
- No 7 Company at Southampton
- No 8 Company at Eastleigh

It was designated as a Defended Ports Unit in Southern Coast Defences, which was based at Portsmouth. There were a large number of forts and batteries around Spithead and the Solent, controlling access to Portsmouth Harbour and Southampton Water, which in time of war would be manned by four Regular RGA companies and the companies of the Hampshire RGA, while the heavy battery was mobile and responsible for the landward defences (TF heavy batteries were usually armed with obsolescent 4.7-inch guns).

== World War I ==
=== Mobilisation ===
On the outbreak of war, the Hampshire RGA mobilised under the command of Lt-Col J.E. Dawe, TD, in Nos 6–9 Fire Commands. Shortly afterwards, TF units were invited to volunteer for Overseas Service and on 15 August 1914, the War Office (WO) issued instructions to separate those men who had signed up for Home Service only, and form these into reserve units. On 31 August, the formation of a reserve or 2nd Line unit was authorised for each 1st Line unit where 60 per cent or more of the men had volunteered for Overseas Service. The titles of these 2nd Line units would be the same as the original, but distinguished by a '2/' prefix. In this way, duplicate companies and batteries were created, releasing the 1st Line units to be sent overseas.

By October 1914, the campaign on the Western Front was bogging down into Trench warfare and there was an urgent need for batteries of Siege artillery to be sent to France. The WO decided that the TF coastal gunners were well enough trained to take over many of the duties in the coastal defences, releasing Regular RGA gunners for service in the field, and 1st line RGA companies had been authorised to increase their strength by 50 per cent.

Although complete TF defended ports units never left the UK, they did supply drafts of trained gunners to RGA units serving overseas. These included providing cadres as the basis on which to form complete new units for front line service. 47th Siege Battery, RGA, (see below) was formed on 28 July 1915 at Portsmouth with a nucleus from the Hampshire RGA and regular RGA gunners returned from overseas garrisons. Equipped with 8-inch howitzers it went out to the Western Front in November 1915 and served there for the rest of the war. 147th Siege Battery (see below) was formed at Portsmouth on 22 May 1916 based on a cadre of four officers and 78 other ranks from the Hampshire RGA (probably drawn in the main from 1/1st Heavy Bty, which disappeared from the order of battle by April 1917). A large number of other siege batteries were formed in the Portsmouth defences in 1915–16, which may also have included trained men from the Hampshire RGA among the recruits, although the Army Council Instructions did not specifically order this. For example, 27 members of No 4 Company died on active service during the war, even though its 1st and 2nd Line never left the UK.

=== Home Defence ===
After the beginning of air attacks on Britain, the RGA also became responsible for manning anti-aircraft (AA) guns both at home and overseas. A number of AA batteries were stationed round Portsmouth, probably including men drawn from the Hampshire RGA, and Southern Command was also responsible for the AA defence of Coventry and Birmingham, where some Hampshire RGA companies were stationed. Under Army Council Instruction 686 of April 1917, the coastal defence companies of the RGA (TF) were reorganised. The 12 remaining Hampshire RGA companies serving in the Portsmouth garrison and the Coventry and Birmingham AA command (1/2nd, 1/3rd, 1/4th, 1/5th, 1/6th, 1/7th, 1/8th, 2/3rd, 2/4th, 2/5th, 2/6th, 2/7th) were reduced to two companies, which were to be kept up to strength with non-TF recruits.

=== 47th Siege Battery ===
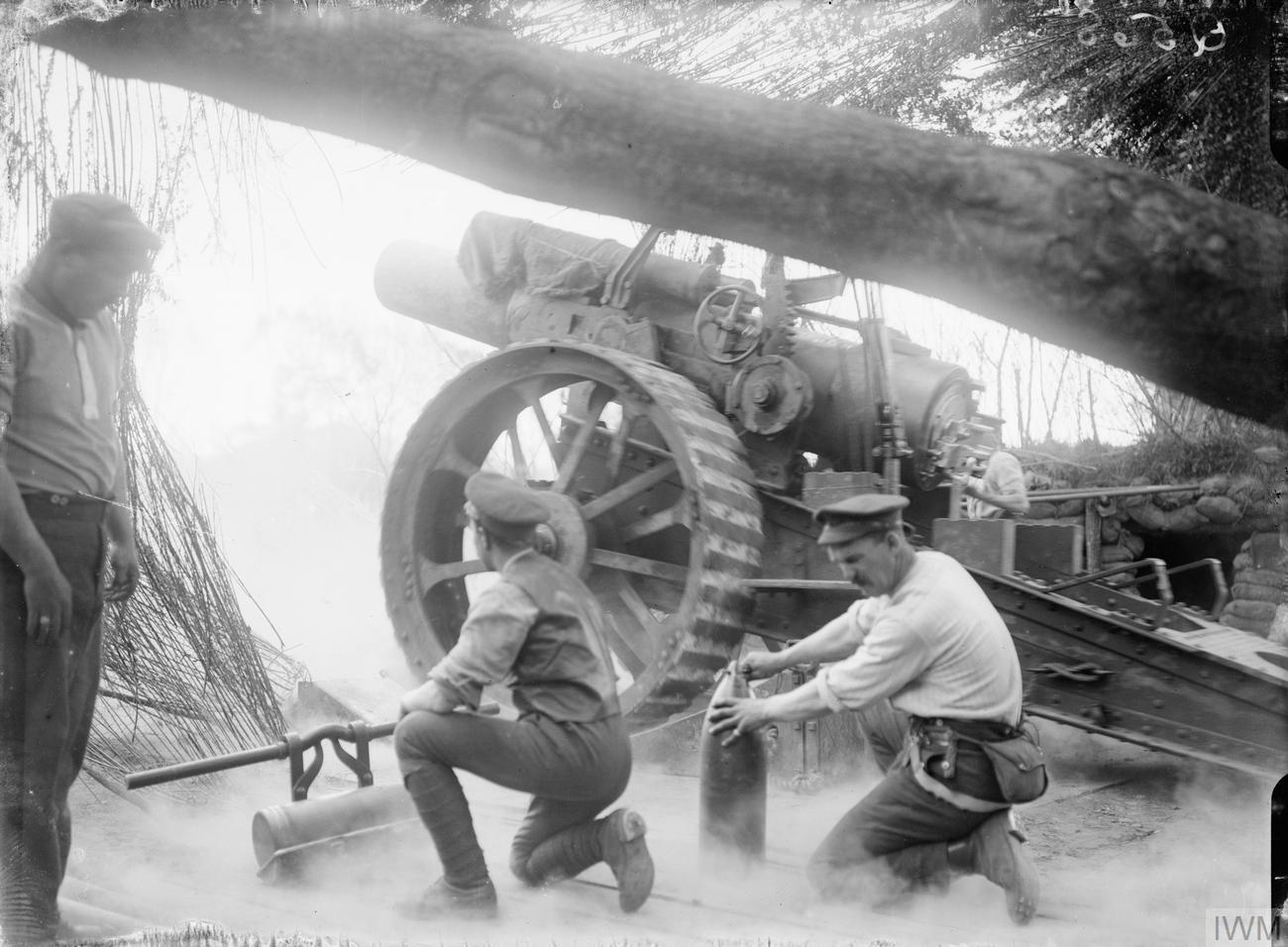
8-inch Howitzer Mk I recoiling.

47th Siege Battery, RGA, was formed on 28 July 1915 at Portsmouth with a nucleus from the Hampshire RGA and regular RGA gunners returned from Mauritius (No 56 Company) and Hong Kong (Nos 83, 87, 88 Companies and the Hong Kong-Singapore Royal Artillery). It went out to the Western Front equipped with four 8-inch howitzers.

After serving in the Ypres Salient, the battery moved south in June 1916 to join Fourth Army in the opening bombardment for the Battle of the Somme, supporting the attack on Fricourt. It remained on the Somme for the whole of that summer's offensive. In early 1917 47th Siege Bty was moved to the Arras sector with First Army, which was preparing for the Battle of Vimy Ridge. As part of 13th Heavy Artillery Group (HAG) it was positioned Marœuil near Arras firing in support of Canadian Corps. The artillery plan for the heavy guns emphasised counter-battery (CB) fire. At Zero hour, while the field guns laid down a Creeping barrage to protect the advancing infantry, the heavy howitzers fired 450 yards (410 m) further ahead to hit the rear areas on the reverse slope of the ridge, especially known gun positions. The attack went in on 9 April, when the Canadians overran three trench lines and seized the crest of the ridge where the batteries soon established observation posts (OPs). At the end of the Arras Offensive the battery returned to Ypres, where it was brought up to a strength of six guns when it was joined by a section from the newly arrived 340th Siege Bty. It fought through the Third Ypres Offensive until November 1917.

Whereas batteries had previously been moved from one group to another, HAG allocations were becoming more fixed, and in December 1917 they were converted into permanent RGA brigades. 47th Siege Bty joined 5th Brigade and served with it for the rest of the war.

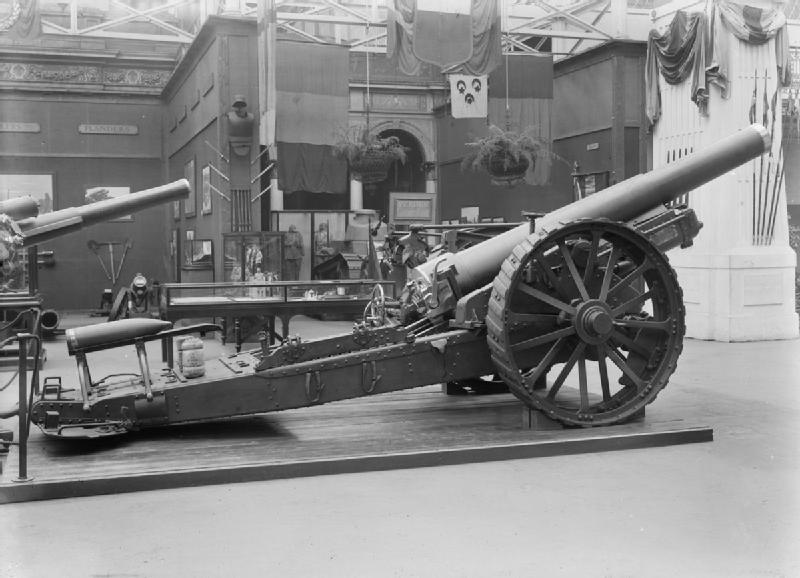
A Mark VII 8-inch howitzer displayed after the war at The Crystal Palace.

5th Brigade was sent up to the front as reinforcements when the German Spring Offensive opened on 21 March 1918, but the batteries were soon caught up in the 'Great Retreat'. The brigade got back without losing a gun to Villers-Bretonneux, where the Germans were halted. The battery participated in the Battle of Amiens that launched the Allies' Hundred Days Offensive. In the subsequent advance the battery used captured heavy howitzers in addition to its own. It supported the assault crossing of the St Quentin Canal that broke open the Hindenburg Line on 29 September. Its last operation was to support the New Zealand Division in capturing the old fortress of Le Quesnoy on 4 November.

Demobilisation got under way after the Armistice with Germany, and units were reduced to cadre strength and shipped back to the UK. On 19 April 1919, while stationed at Newtownards in County Down, the personnel of 47th Siege Bty were merged with the cadre of 46th Siege Bty to form a new 46th Bty, RGA, in the Regular Army.

=== 147th Siege Battery ===
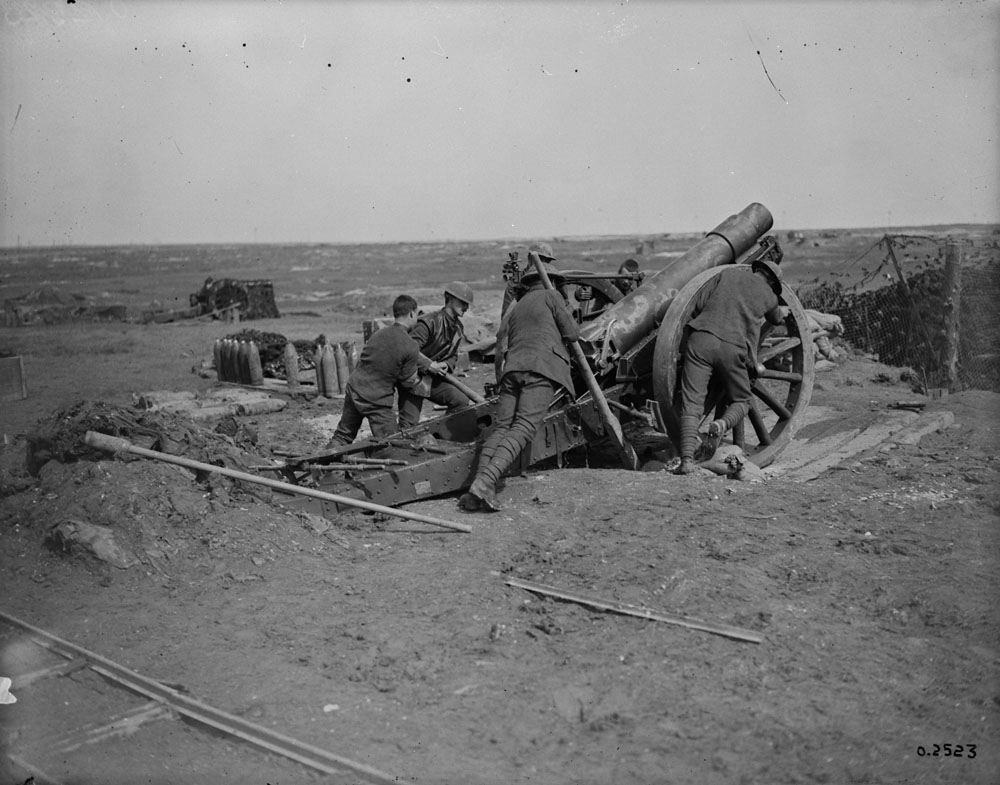
Crew positioning a 6-inch 26 cwt howitzer in 1918.

147th Siege Battery went out to the Western Front on 21 August 1916, equipped with four 6-inch howitzers. On 25 August, it joined 33rd HAG serving with Fourth Army, which was engaged in the Somme offensive. The battery moved to 49th HAG on 29 October as the offensive ground to a conclusion and then to others within Fourth Army (77th HAG on 20 December, 28th HAG on 10 February) during the winter of 1916–17. On 22 March 1917 the battery transferred to 18th HAG with First Army. 18th HAG was positioned just behind Arras, also in support of Canadian Corps during the capture of Vimy Ridge.

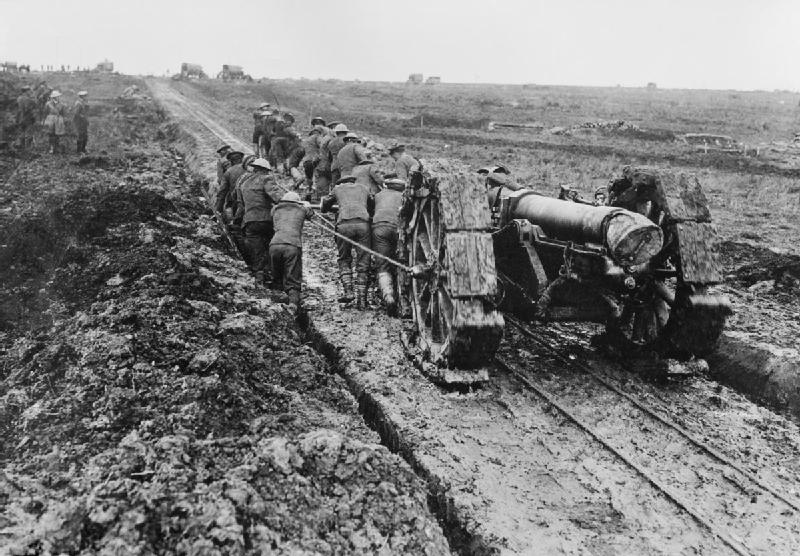
6-inch howitzer being moved through mud on the Western Front.

Fighting south of Vimy (the Battle of Arras) continued into May, with 147th Siege Bty joining 83rd HAG with Third Army on 25 May. It was back to 18th HAG in First Army on 16 June, at rest and training 8–24 August, and then joined 78th HAG on 3 September. Later that month the battery was reorganised, a section from the newly arrived 446th Siege Bty joining on 22 September, bringing 147th up to a strength of six howitzers.

On 16 December, the battery was reduced to four guns once more, with a section leaving to help reform 190th Siege Bty, and joined 43rd HAG with Fourth Army the following day. The battery was at rest from 23 December to 9 January 1918. By now HAG allocations were becoming more fixed, and on 1 February 1918 they were converted into permanent RGA brigades. 43rd Brigade was composed of units with a variety of different calibre howitzers. 147th Siege Bty remained with this brigade until the Armistice.

In April 1918, the battery was once more made up to a strength of six howitzers when a new third section joined. 43rd Brigade RGA transferred from Fourth to Second Army on 1 May 1918 and remained with it until the Armistice, fighting through the Allied Hundred Days Offensive. For example, at the Fifth Battle of Ypres starting on 28 September, 43rd Bde's batteries directly supported the assault of 29th Division, having remained hidden and silent until Zero hour. When the infantry attacked at 05.30, they quickly took their intermediate objectives (06.30) and first objectives (08.30–08.45). The second wave then passed through to continue the advance towards the village of Kruiseecke, but had to halt until 12.15, because the heavy artillery barrage was still falling on the village. Such rapid progress could not be kept up, and German reinforcements halted further advances, but 29th Division had crossed the Ypres Ridge, the objective of so many failed assaults in 1917. After that Second Army continued to advance through October until it reached the River Dendre by the time the Armistice came in to force.

In the interim order of battle for the postwar army, the battery was supposed to form D Bty in LXXV Brigade, RGA, but this was rescinded after the signing of the Treaty of Versailles, and the remaining cadre of the battery was disbanded in 1919.

== Interwar ==
The Hampshire RGA was placed in suspended animation after demobilisation in 1919. When the TF was reconstituted on 7 February 1920, the unit was reformed, still under the command of Brevet Colonel J.E. Dawe, with HQ at Southampton, one battery from 1 Hvy Bty and Nos, 2, 5, 6, and 7 Cos, a second battery from Nos 3 and 8 Cs, and a third battery from No 4 Co. The TF was reorganised as the Territorial Army the following year, when the unit was redesignated the Hampshire Coast Brigade, RGA and the batteries were numbered 153–6. The RGA was subsumed into the RA on 1 June 1924, when the unit became the Hampshire Heavy Brigade, RA. It formed part of the coast defence troops in 43rd (Wessex) Divisional Area and had the following organisation:

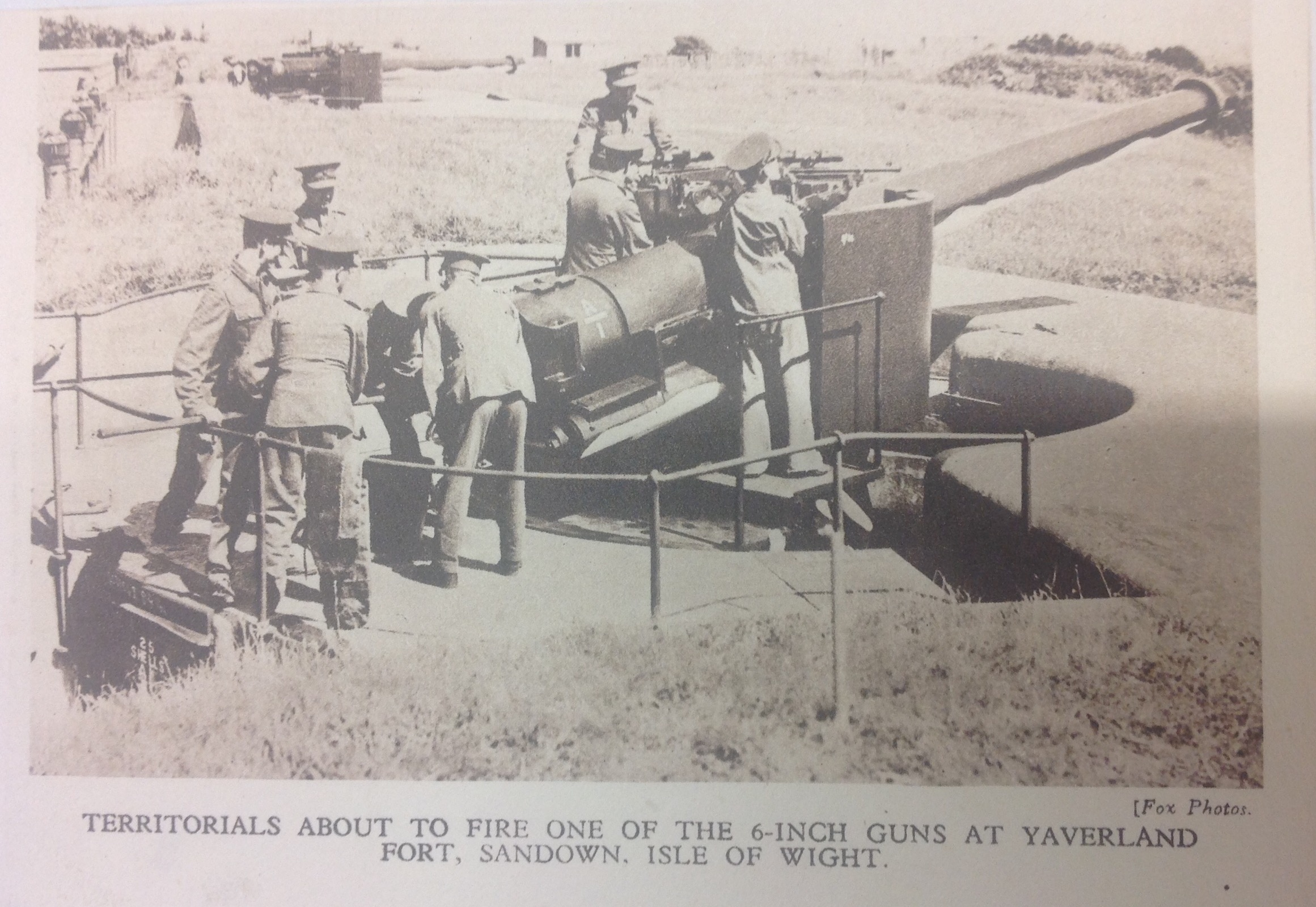
Territorials about to fire one of the 6-inch guns at Yaverland Battery, ca 1935.

- HQ at St Mary's Road, Southampton
- 153 Heavy Battery at St Mary's Road
- 154 Heavy Battery at Bishop's Waltham, later at Eastleigh as well
- 155 Heavy Battery at Eastleigh, later at Portsmouth and Fareham
- 156 Heavy Battery at Governor's Green, Portsmouth, absorbed into 155 Bty February 1938

In 1927, it was decided that the coast defences of the UK would be manned by the TA alone. A 1927 report on coastal defences by the Committee of Imperial Defence made recommendations for defence schemes at 15 'Class A' home ports, including Portsmouth and Southampton (Scheme 2), but little was done to modernise them before the outbreak of World War II.

The unit was redesignated the Hampshire Heavy Regiment, RA on 1 November 1938 when the RA adopted the term 'regiment' instead of 'brigade' for a lieutenant-colonel's command.

== World War II ==
=== Mobilisation ===
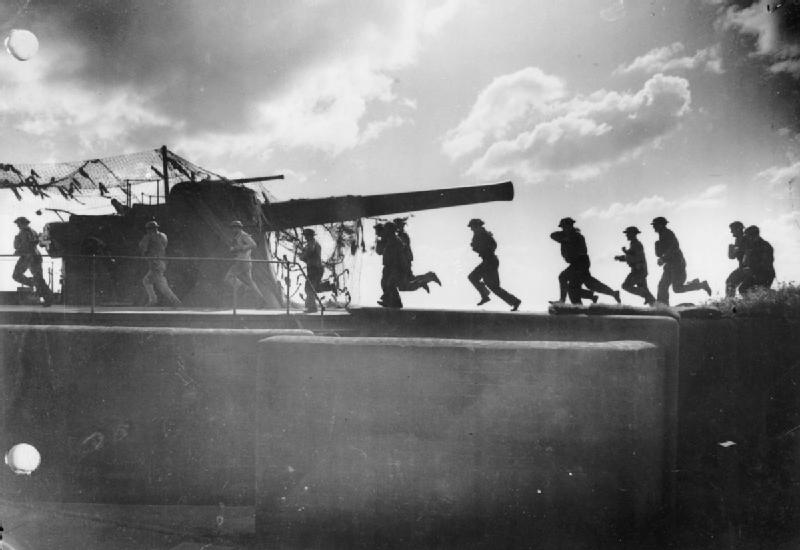
A crew from 118 Bty ready one of the two 9.2 inch gun coastal defence guns for action at Culver Point Battery, August 1940.

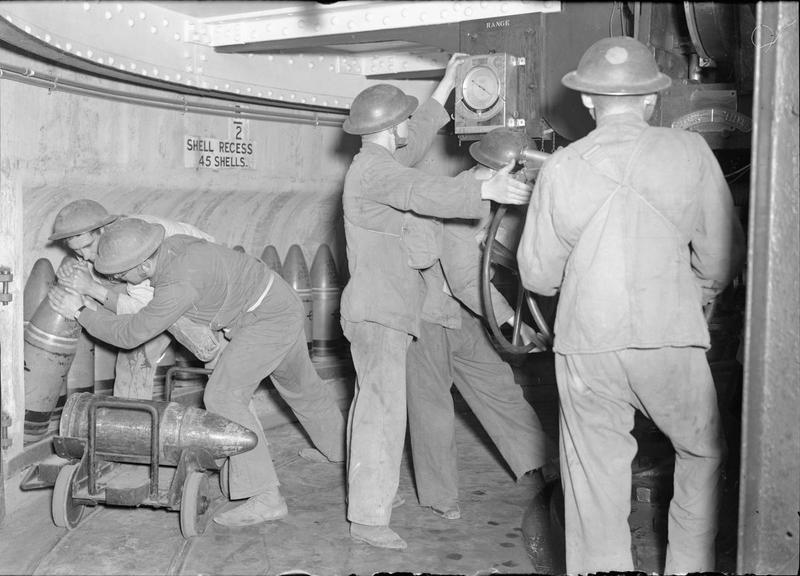
Preparing shells for one of the 9.2-inch guns at Culver Battery, 24 August 1940.

On the outbreak of war, the regiment and its three batteries mobilised in the Portsmouth Defences. Together with Princess Beatrice's (Isle of Wight Rifles) Heavy Rgt, it was responsible for manning 6 × 9.2-inch, 16 × 6-inch and 8 × 12-pounder guns.

With the danger of invasion after the British Expeditionary Force was evacuated from Dunkirk, the coastal artillery regiments underwent a major reorganisation in the summer of 1940. On 9 September, the Hampshire Heavy Rgt expanded to form three new regiments:

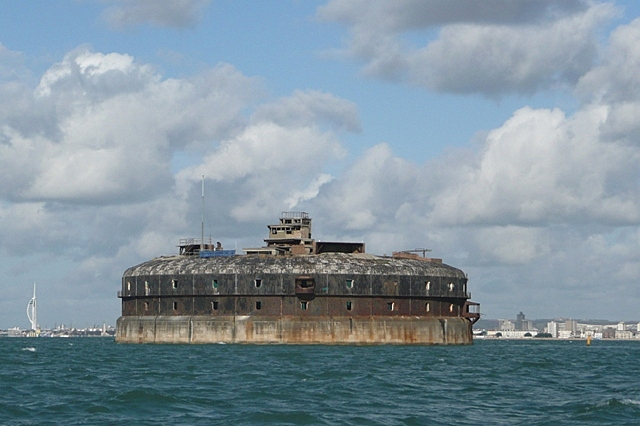
Horse Sand Fort.

- 527th (Hampshire) Coast Rgt – on the Isle of Wight
  - A Bty at Culver Battery – redesignated 118 Bty 1 April 1941
  - B Bty at Nodes Point Battery and St Helens Fort – reorganised as 119 (9.2-inch) and 120 (6-inch) Btys 1 April 1941
  - 60 Coast Observer Detachment (COD) – joined summer 1941
- 528th (Hampshire) Coast Rgt – at Horse Sand Fort
  - A Bty at Horse Sand Fort – redesignated 121 Bty 1 April 1941
  - B Bty at No Man's Land Fort – redesignated 122 Bty 1 April 1941
- 529th (Hampshire) Coast Rgt – at Portsmouth
  - A Bty at Spithead – redesignated 123 Bty 1 April 1941
  - B Bty at Esplanade, Southsea Castle and Old Saluting Batteries – redesignated 124 Bty 1 April 1941
  - C Bty at Fort Blockhouse and Fort Monckton – redesignated 125 Bty 1 April 1941
  - 32 (Static) Defence Troop – joined by January 1942

=== Home Defence ===
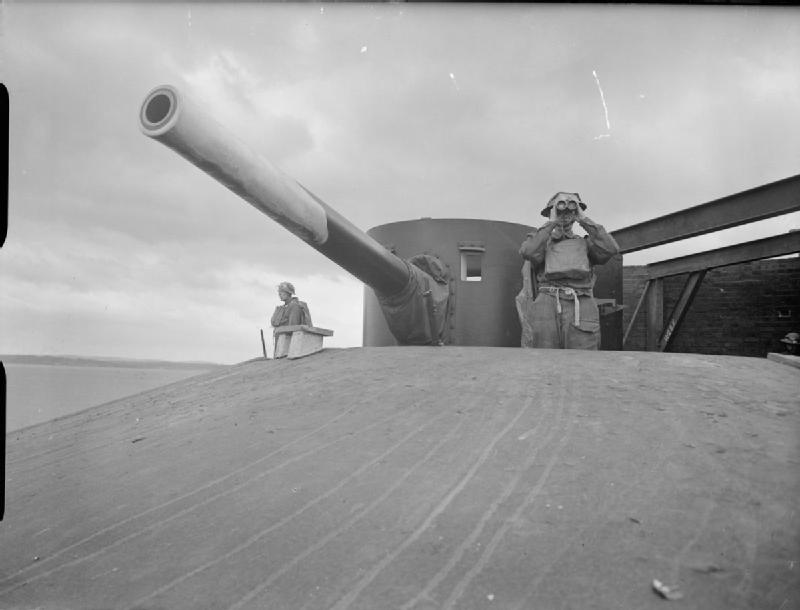
6-inch BL gun on top of Horse Sand Fort.

By their height in September 1941, the Portsmouth and Southampton defences manned by the Hampshire and Isle of Wight coast regiments contained the following guns:

- 6 × 9.2-inch
- 14 × 6-inch
- 8 × 12-pounders
- 8 × 6-pounders

In the spring of 1942, the coast regiments round the Solent came under the command of a new V Corps Coast Artillery (CA) HQ, which was joined in the summer by 3rd CA Plotting Room (later 3rd Army Plotting Room) in Portsmouth. When V Corps HQ went to North Africa as part of Operation Torch in late 1942, the CA HQ and plotting room came under Hampshire & Dorset District of Southern Command.

=== Mid War ===
By 1942, the threat from German attack had diminished, the coast defences were seen as absorbing excessive manpower and there was demand for trained gunners for the fighting fronts. A process of reducing the manpower in the coast defences began. 528th Coast Rgt was disbanded on 7 December 1942, the remaining batteries transferring to 527th, leaving the following organisation:

- 527th (Hampshire) Coast Rgt – at Culver Down, IoW, in Culver Fire Command
  - 118, 119, 120 Btys
  - 121, 122 Btys – transferred from 528th Coast Rgt 7 December 1942
  - 441 Independent Bty – formed at Yaverland Battery by 1 June 1943; joined by 1 July
  - 60 COD – disbanded by 1 July 1943
- 529th (Hampshire) Coast Rgt – at Square Tower, Portsmouth, in Square Tower Fire Command
  - 123, 124, 125 Btys
  - 165, 183, 209 Btys – joined from 539th Coast Rgt at Southampton, by 17 March 1943

=== Late war ===
The manpower requirements for the forthcoming Allied invasion of Normandy (Operation Overlord) led to further reductions in coast defences in April 1944. By this stage of the war, many of the coast battery positions were manned by Home Guard detachments or were in the hands of care and maintenance parties. On 1 April, 529th Coast Rgt was placed in suspended animation, the batteries joining 527th, which had the following organisation until the end of the war.

- 527th (Hampshire) Coast Rgt
  - 118, 119, 120, 121, 122, 441 Btys
  - 123, 124, 125, 165, 183, 209 Btys – transferred from 529th Coast Rgt 1 April 1944
  - 102 Bty – transferred from 522nd (Dorsetshire) Coast Rgt 15 February 1945
  - 103, 104, 105, 106, 107, 134, 239, 387 Btys – transferred from 522nd (Dorsetshire) Coast Rgt 28 February 1945

Then, on 1 June 1945, after VE Day, 102, 103, 104, 105, 106, 107, 121, 122, 134 and 165 Btys began entering suspended animation (completing on 22 June), while 183, 209, 239, 387 and 441 Btys were disbanded. Next, on 15 December 1945, 118 and 125 Btys commenced suspended animation (completing on 17 January 1946. Finally, Regimental HQ and the remaining batteries (119, 120, 121, 123 and 124) began entering suspended animation at Southsea Castle on 10 January 1946, completing the process on 17 January, when the remaining personnel joined 566th (Devon & Cornwall) Coast Rgt.

== Postwar ==
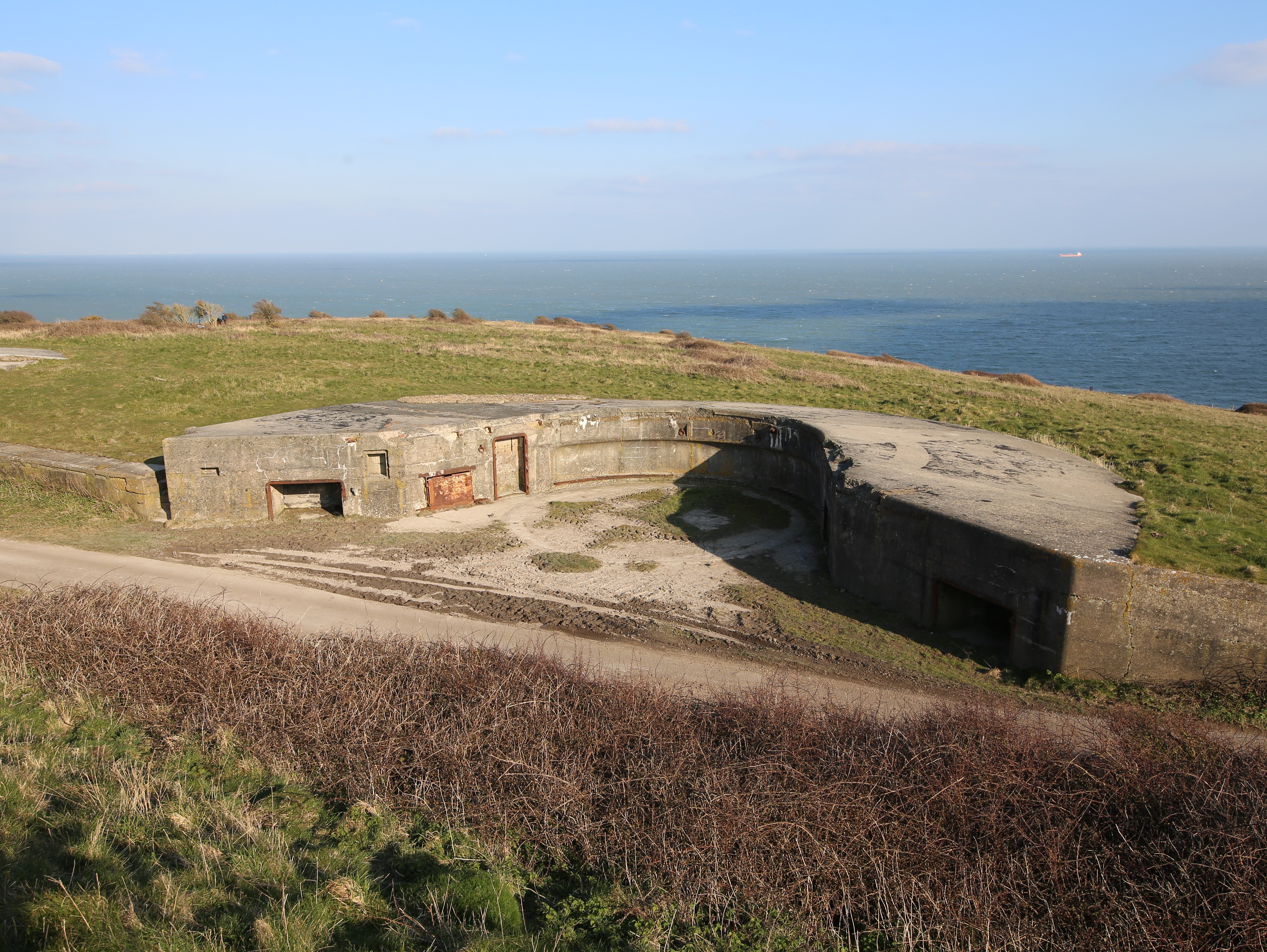
Remains of one of the 9.2-inch gun positions at Culver Battery.

When the TA was reconstituted on 1 January 1947, 529th Coast Rgt was formally disbanded, and 527th was reformed as 406th (Hampshire) Coast Rgt in 102 Coast Brigade.

The coast artillery branch of the RA was abolished during 1956, the regiment being officially disbanded on 15 September, but on 31 October it was instead converted to the Royal Engineers as 581 Construction Squadron, RE. It was assigned to 115 Construction Rgt which reorganised as 115 (Hampshire Fortress) Corps Engineer Rgt in 1961. The squadron was disbanded on 1 April 1967 when the TA was reduced into the Territorial and Army Volunteer Reserve (TAVR), and the remaining personnel joined D (Hampshire Fortress Engineers) Sqn in the Hampshire and Isle of Wight Territorials.

== Honorary Colonels ==
The following served as Honorary Colonel of the unit:

- Alfred B. Sturdee, original commanding officer (CO), 1st Hampshire Admin Brigade, appointed 14 September 1869, continued as Hon Col of the 2nd Hampshire AVC after 1888
- Charles L. Owen, VD, half-pay Captain, Royal Marine Light Infantry, and former CO, 1st Hampshire AVC, appointed 5 April 1888
- Sir Barrington Simeon, 4th Baronet, MP for Southampton, appointed 5 December 1903
- Col J.H. Harrison Hogge, TD, appointed 25 July 1914
- Field Marshal Lord Milne, appointed 24 April 1926
- Bt Col J.E. Dawe, former CO, appointed 30 September 1931
- Col C.R. Gillett, DSO, appointed 30 September 1937

== Memorial ==
After World War I, No 4 Company of the Hampshire RGA erected a memorial tablet in the Royal Garrison Church in Old Portsmouth, adjacent to the company's drill hall at Governor's Green. The plaque lists 27 men who died on active service. Although the church was bombed out during World War II, the memorial is still visible in the ruined nave.
