= St Mary's Road drill hall, Southampton =

British military installation

St Mary's Road drill hall
- Southampton
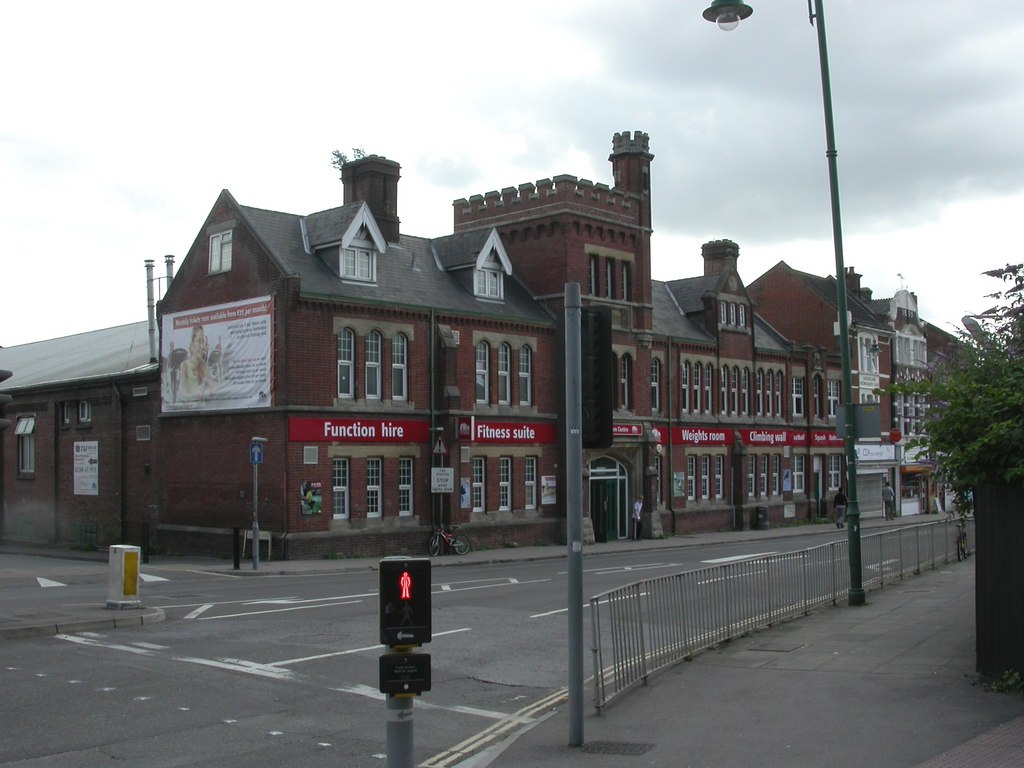
- St Mary's Road drill hall

Site information
- Type: Drill hall
- Owner: Southampton City Council
- Operator: Active Nation
- Open to the public: yes

Location
- Location in Southampton
- Coordinates: 50°54′39″N 1°23′58″W

Site history
- Built: 1889
- Built for: War Office
- Architect: W H Mitchell
- In use: 1890–1969

The St Mary's Road drill hall is a former military installation in Southampton. It is a Grade II listed building.

== History ==
The building was designed by W H Mitchell as the headquarters of the 1st Hampshire Artillery Volunteers and completed in 1889. It was an initiative of Colonel Edward Bance, former mayor of Southampton, and was opened by Edward Stanhope, Secretary of State for War, in 1890. With the formation of the Territorial Force in 1908, the 1st Hampshire AV became the Hampshire Royal Garrison Artillery, but the drill hall also became the home of the Hampshire Royal Horse Artillery in 1908. Both units were mobilised at the drill hall in August 1914, with the Hampshire RGA manning coast forts and the Hampshire RHA being deployed to the Middle East.

After World War I, the Hampshire RGA resumed its coast defence role while the Hampshire RHA amalgamated with the Hampshire Yeomanry and evolved to become 378 (Hampshire RHA) Battery with its base in Southampton. It was renamed 218 (Hampshire RHA) Battery in 1937 and served as part of 72nd (Hampshire) Heavy Anti-Aircraft Regiment, RA, during World War II. The heavy regiment formed three coast artillery regiments during the war that manned the Portsmouth and Southampton defences.

Postwar, the drill hall was decommissioned and converted for leisure use in 1974.

The building remained in use as St Mary's Community and Leisure Centre, owned and operated by Southampton City Council, until its closure in December 2021. Following a campaign by local residents, the facility reopened in August 2022, managed by the charity Active Nation. In February 2025, the council was seeking a new operator to lease the building on a long term agreement.
