= 46th Siege Battery, Royal Garrison Artillery =

46th Siege Battery, RGA 19th Medium Battery, RA
- Cap Badge of the Royal Regiment of Artillery
- Active: 30 July 1915 – 20 October 1943
- Country: United Kingdom
- Branch: British Army
- Role: Siege Artillery
- Part of: Royal Garrison Artillery
- Engagements: Battle of the Somme; Battle of the Ancre; Battle of Arras; Battle of Hill 70; Third Battle of Ypres; German Spring Offensive; Hundred Days Offensive

46th Siege Battery was a heavy howitzer unit of Britain's Royal Garrison Artillery (RGA) in World War I, formed at Tynemouth with a nucleus of Territorial Force coastal gunners from Cornwall. It served on the Somme and the Ancre, at Arras and Hill 70, before going to Ypres during the battles of Autumn 1917. It then fought against the German Spring Offensive and participated in the final Allied Hundred Days Offensive. The battery was absorbed into the Regular Army after the war.

== Mobilisation & training ==
On the outbreak of war in August 1914, units of the part-time Territorial Force (TF) were invited to volunteer for Overseas Service and the majority of the Cornwall (Duke of Cornwall's) Royal Garrison Artillery (CRGA) did so. This was a 'defended ports unit' with companies stationed at the small ports on the coast of Cornwall.

By October 1914, the campaign on the Western Front was bogging down into Trench warfare and there was an urgent need for batteries of siege artillery to be sent to reinforce the British Expeditionary Force (BEF). The War Office decided that the TF coastal gunners were well enough trained to take over many of the duties in the coastal defences, releasing Regular Army RGA gunners for service in the field. Although complete TF defended ports units never served overseas, the companies that had volunteered for foreign service were soon supplying trained gunners to RGA units serving overseas and providing cadres to help form complete units.

46th Siege Battery, RGA, was officially formed at Tynemouth on 30 July 1915 under the command of Major T.S.N. Hardinge, who had been the gunnery instructor of the North East Coast Defences, with 115 other ranks (ORs) drawn from Nos 12 and 47 Companies, RGA, of the Tynemouth garrison. On 10 August three officers and 78 ORs from the CRGA, led by Captain A.W. Gill, officer commanding (OC) No 7 Co, CRGA, at Truro, travelled from their headquarters at Falmouth to the RGA camp at Lydd, where they were joined by the Tynemouth contingent on 16 August. Together with 47th Siege Bty the battery formed a new 'L' Siege Brigade (Training), but was transferred to 'H' Siege Bde (T) on 30 August. The establishment of the battery was then reduced, and the surplus men were posted to 60th Siege Bty, which was being formed. Like other batteries training at Lydd, the gunners of 46th Siege Bty did their field firing with 9.45-inch Skoda howitzers from the Second Boer War and 8-inch rifled muzzle-loading howitzers dating from 1879.

On the completion of its training the battery proceeded to Taunton where it drew its equipment, four 9.2-inch howitzers. The battery's Army Service Corps motor transport section (2nd Section, No 565 MT Company) took the 30 lorries and 5 Holt 75 caterpillar tractors to Avonmouth Docks to be loaded onto SS Chevington on 17 October. The main body with the guns entrained at Taunton for Southampton on 20 October, where the guns and ASC personnel were embarked on the Chevington while the gunners boarded the SS France. The battery disembarked at Boulogne on 21–22 October and marched across France, arriving on 29 October at Authie in the Somme sector, where it was billeted.

== Western Front ==
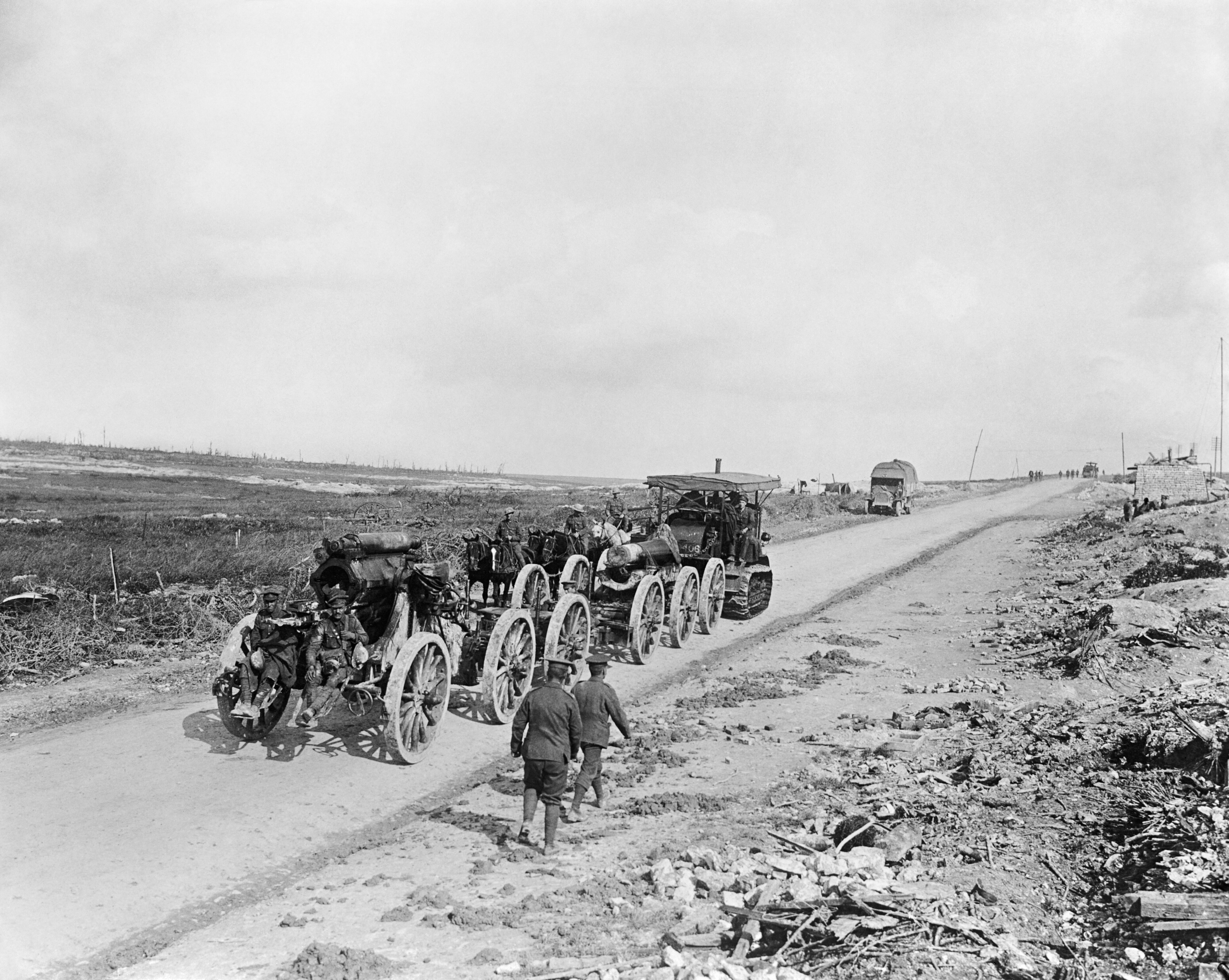
A Holt 75 caterpillar tractor hauling a 9.2-inch howitzer on the Somme, summer 1916.

46th Siege Bty joined X Corps' Heavy Artillery (HA) under Third Army on 1 November and began laying concrete gun platforms and preparing dugouts at its gun positions: Right Half Bty under Maj Hardinge at Beaussart, Left Half Bty under Capt Gill at St Amand. The ground conditions at Beaussart meant that the gunners and caterpillars struggled to position the guns. On 8 November the battery came under the command of 31st HA Brigade, which was designated as a Siege Group under Third Army HA Reserve; 565 MT Co, ASC, became 31st Bde's ammunition column.

Hindered by snow and frost, it was not until 24 November that the gun positions at Beaussart were complete and the observation posts (OPs) established: No 2 gun fired the battery's first registration shots with the help of an observation aircraft. After problems with calibrating the guns and remounting them on firmer platforms, it was not until 23 December that the section carried out a full bombardment, firing 30 rounds at the Hawthorn Ridge Redoubt. On 8 December Left Section (LX) moved from St Amand to Warloy and came under 23rd HA Bde. It rejoined on 20 January 1916 and returned to its old positions at St Amand. During January the battery settled down to the routine of trench warfare, firing a few rounds most days, at targets such as trenches on Redan Ridge, and enemy occupied farms and villages, including Beaucourt, Beaumont-Hamel, Serre and Thiepval.

=== Somme ===
On 4 March 31 HA Bde HQ moved away, handing over its batteries to 17th HA Bde, which was acting as Northern Group of X Corps HA. It ordered 46th Siege Bty to take over gun positions between Mailly and Englebelmer from 50th Siege Bty. The group concentrated on counter-battery (CB) work against enemy artillery and firing on trenches to assist the infantry. The BEF was beginning to prepare for that summer's 'Big Push' (the Battle of the Somme) and Fourth Army took over the Somme sector, with 17th HA Bde coming under VIII Corps at the end of March. A change in artillery policy from 4 April led the RGA brigades to be redesignated as 'Heavy Artillery Groups' (HAGs), with batteries being frequently switched between them as required.

Apart from a few registration shots 46th Siege Bty remained silent for most of April and May while it was preparing new positions halfway between Beaussart and Colincamps for itself, and also for other batteries to move in later. It transferred from 17th to 1st HAG on 4 May but carried on with digging its gun pits and preparing OPs. Dumping of ammunition at the battery's new positions for the forthcoming offensive began on 8 June, and the last howitzer was mounted on 17 June, when re-registration began. The bombardment programme for the offensive was to be spread over five days, U, V, W, X and Y before the assault was launched on Z day. On U Day (24 June) the battery began barbed wire-cutting, with LX prepared to carry out CB fire if required. However, the battery complained that registration methods and small amount of ammunition allocated gave unsatisfactory results. More general bombardment began on W day, with 46th Siege Bty shelling Puisieux, the Heidenkopf strongpoint known as the Quadrilateral Redoubt, and Munich Trench. The strenuous work of firing the heavy guns was divided into 2-hour periods to allow the gunners to rest, Forward Observation Officers (FOOs) to be relieved, and the guns to cool. On several days the weather was too bad for good air or ground observation and the programme was extended by two days (Y1 and Y2).

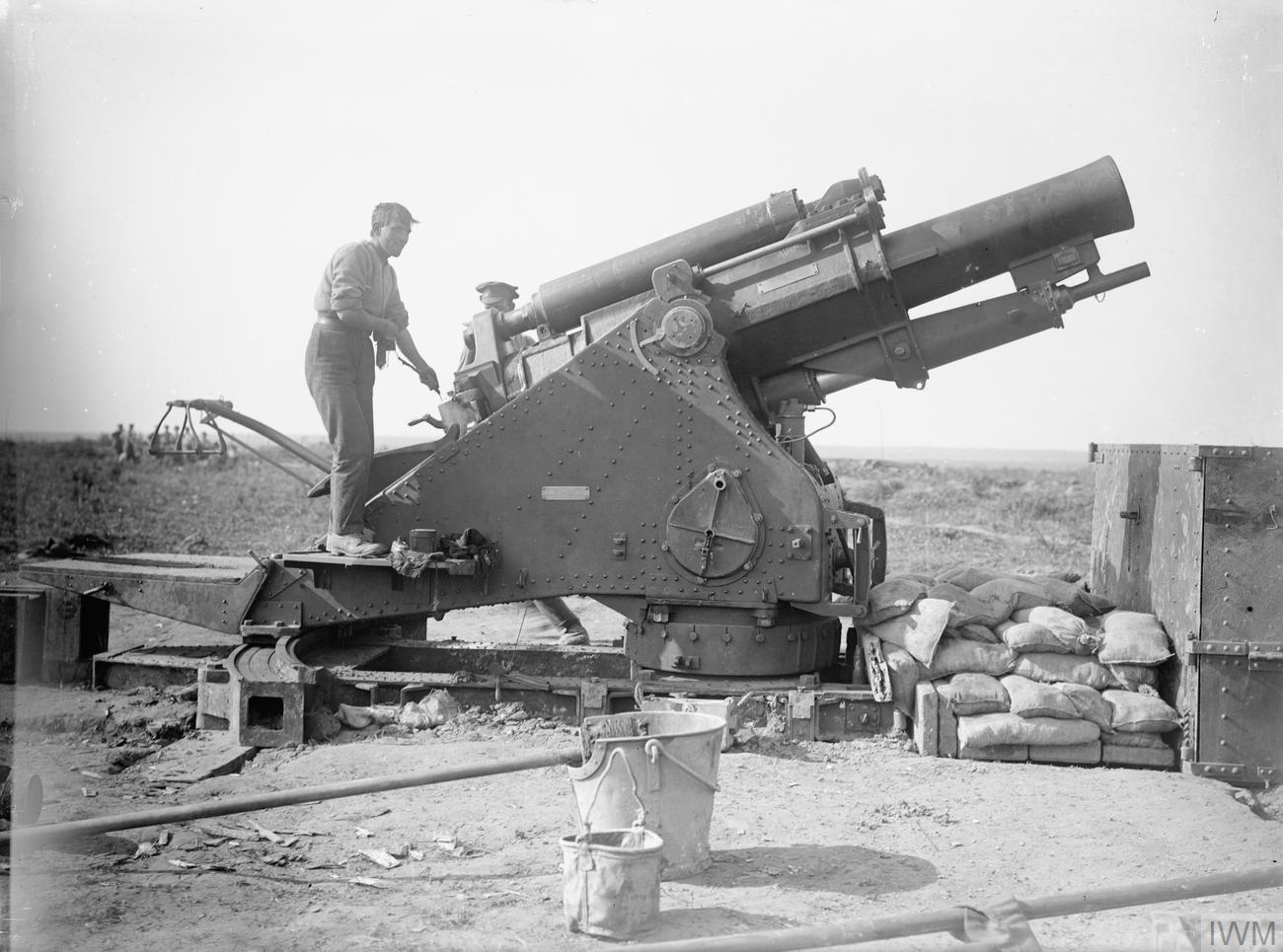
9.2-inch howitzer in action on the Somme, 1916.

At 06.25 on Z Day (1 July) the final bombardment began. When VIII Corps' infantry launched their assault at 07.30, the heavy artillery had already lifted off the German front line and 46th Siege Bty was firing at their third line. The attacks on Serre and Beaumont-Hamel by 31st and 29th Divisions were disastrous. 4th Division found the wire better cut and the trenches destroyed, but the German dugouts sheltering the machine gun teams were hardly touched. Although it too suffered heavy casualties 4th Division was able to capture the Quadrilateral and some men entered Munich Trench, but counter-attacks from the direction of Serre drove them back. By the end of the day VIII Corps' only gain was the Quadrilateral, and that had to abandoned next day.

Although Fourth Army continued attacking, the offensive was shut down on VIII Corps' front. Reserve Army took over that sector on 4 July. There was very little firing for 46th Siege Bty in the days following the battle, and it returned some of its unused ammunition to the railhead for distribution to other units. Later it fired a few rounds a day at various targets, including Grandcourt, to assist the operations further south. The battery resumed CB fire, sometimes with air observation by No 15 Squadron, Royal Flying Corps, when German aircraft and wireless jamming did not interfere. Continued firing with the guns trained right (south) led to damage to their platforms. At the end of July VIII Corps HQ handed over the sector in front of Beaumont-Hamel to XIV Corps, then V Corps took over in mid-August. It carried out active trench warfare and began preparations for renewed operations in the sector. From 25 August 46th Siege Bty began firing at trenches (Railway Alley, Redoubt Alley, etc) rather than hostile batteries. Reserve Army's assault went in at 05.10 on 3 September, with 39th Division attacking up the valley of the River Ancre. 46th Siege Bty fired on the Quarries and then laid down a barrage on the station before moving onto the front edge of Beaucourt and then the German second line trenches. The attack, however, was another failure.

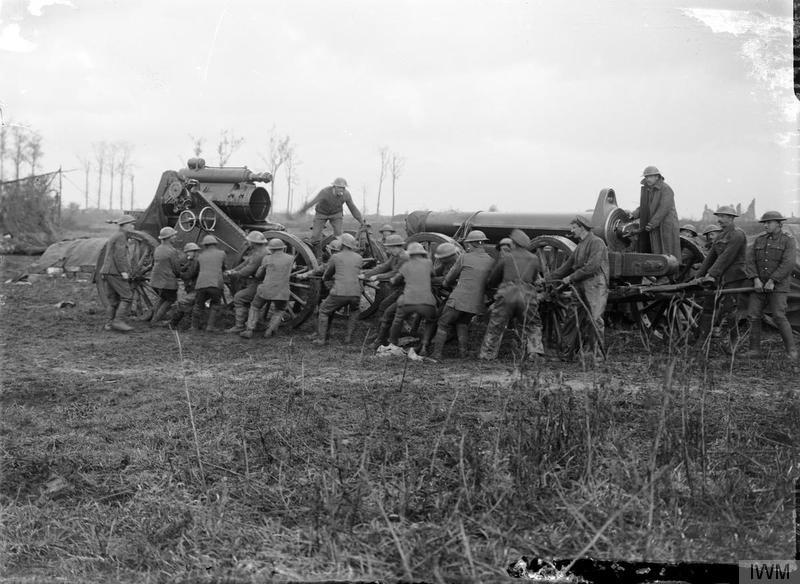
Moving a 9.2-inch howitzer onto its travelling carriage.

On 9 September the battery came temporarily under 16th HAG while transferring to 58th HAG at Mesnil. Left Section dismounted its guns overnight and began preparing the new positions, RX following a day later. On 11 September LX took part in a bombardment of Miraumont, then began firing at enemy trenches (one of which was recorded by 16th HAG as 'pulverised'). During 15 September the battery fired a large number of CB tasks with aircraft observation in support of the Battle of Flers–Courcelette. On 23 September it began firing on Stuff Trench and Regina Trench in preparation for the Battle of Thiepval Ridge that was launched on 26 September and continued for four days. The battery then dismounted its guns and moved them (with difficulty in the mud) back to their old positions, coming under 1st HAG once more. From here it supported Reserve Army's continuing attacks (the Battle of the Ancre Heights), firing on Grandcourt, Muck Trench and Beaucourt Redoubt. From 22 October the targets switched to Puisieux, Serre and Beaumont-Hamel as Reserve Army (soon redesignated Fifth Army) attempted to capture the objectives of 1 July. It took a further major attack (the Battle of the Ancre 13–18 November) for V Corps finally to take Beaumont-Hamel and Beaucourt; this ended the Somme Offensive.

=== Winter 1916–17 ===
The normal routine of static trench warfare was then resumed, with 46th Siege Bty still shelling Puisieux and Munich Trench. On 5 January 1917 it fired on Ten Tree Alley to support a small operation by XIII Corps. The battery was then rested from 14 to 26 January 1917. After returning to its gun positions, it came under the command of 43rd HAG from 19 February 1917.

On 24 February patrols from V Corps reported that the Germans had pulled out of their positions in front. It was the start of a planned withdrawal to the Hindenburg Line (Operation Alberich). On 2 March 46th Siege Bty reconnoitred new positions at the abandoned ruins of Serre, from which it could reach the German R1 or Bucquoy Line, but the road to Serre ceased to exist beyond the old front lines and movement for anything bigger than field artillery was impossible. The battery began to move forward on 9 March, taken part way by lorry, then by Decauville Railway, but abandoned the effort on 12 March. Instead it moved north to the Arras sector where on 18 March it joined 56th HAG under XVII Corps' HA. The battery camped in Marœuil Wood and took over gun positions that had been partly prepared by 251st Siege Bty.

=== Arras ===
XVII Corps was preparing for Third Army's Arras Offensive. The battery continued working on its positions, hauling in its guns and unloading ammunition. 56th HAG was then designated as the corps Trench Bombardment Group and exchanged its CB batteries with 80th HAG on 24 March. CB preparation for the offensive had already begun when 46th Siege Bty began registering its guns on 31 March. Weather conditions on several days were unsuitable for air or ground observation, when the battery was forced to fire blind by the map. The intense bombardment lasted for four days (V–Y) before Z Day on 9 April. The battery suffered frequent problems: No 4 gun kept leaning to the right, the buffer of No 3 gun kept overheating and leaking. On Z Day XVII Corps attacked with three divisions and was largely successful, except for a hold-up on one flank. Large numbers of prisoners were taken in the German front line, demoralised by the bombardment. Immediately, 46th Siege Bty began dismounting its guns and reconnoitring new positions at Roclincourt, just behind the old front line. Despite the main road being impassable, the battery got its first two guns mounted on 15 April.

By now, XIII Corps of First Army had taken over this section of the front for the follow-up attack (the Second Battle of the Scarpe). Its objective was Gavrelle, for which XIII Corps had massive artillery support; 46th Siege Bty began bombarding this village on 19 April. The attack (by 63rd (Royal Naval) Division) went in on 23 April and captured Gavrelle, but the troops could not push beyond it. Several counter-attacks were beaten back with the help of the artillery. Again, the battery dismounted its guns that night and moved further forward. By 26 April they were firing on Gavrelle Church and nearby trenches and villages. The next bounds, the Battle of Arleux (28 April) and the attack on Oppy during the Third Battle of the Scarpe (3–4 May) were progressively less successful, and the offensive was closed down.

On 12 May Maj T.S.N. Hardinge was promoted to command 70th HAG, and was replaced by Maj J.C. Bassett. Over the following weeks the battery fired on various trench targets, and was itself shelled by the enemy on several occasions. Oppy Wood was finally captured on 28 June, as a diversion from the BEF's planned Flanders Offensive, and 80th HAG supported XIII Corps' active raiding on its front. Then on 20 July 46th Siege Bty began packing up to move to join 67th HAG with I Corps in the Béthune sector.

=== Ypres ===
The new battery positions were at Vermelles with billets at Nœux-les-Mines. The guns were registered on Douvrin Distillery Chimney and resumed CB work with aircraft observation. First Army launched the Battle of Hill 70 on 15 August as a further diversion from the continued fighting at the Third Battle of Ypres. I Corps HA was very active supporting the main attack on Hill 70 by the Canadian Corps. The fighting continued for another 10 days, during which the battery carried out large numbers of CB tasks, sometimes interrupted by hostile shelling.

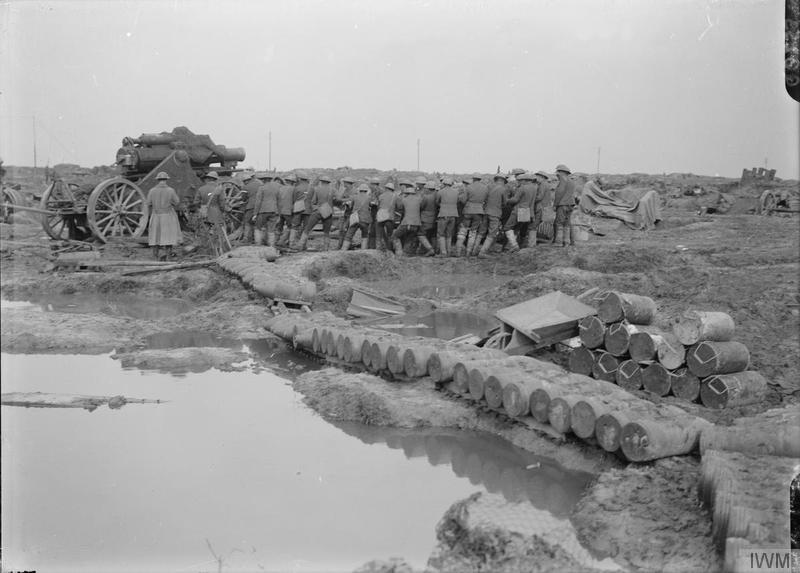
Positioning a 9.2-inch howitzer and its ammunition in the mud of the Ypres Salient, 1917.

On 2 September 46th Siege Bty pulled out and went to billets in Béthune, while an advance party travelled to prepare new positions at Verbrandmolen in the Ypres Salient under Second Army. On 8 September the battery joined 98th HAG, which had been brought in to command the Northern CB Group of X Corps HA in the continuing fighting at Ypres. By the time the battery had its guns in position (12–13 September) it had suffered about 20 casualties from enemy shellfire. The Northern Group carried out CB shoots with aircraft observation in support of a series of attacks by Second Army: the Battles of the Menin Road Ridge (20 September), Polygon Wood (26 September) and Broodseinde (4 October). During the attacks one or two heavy howitzers were dedicated to each enemy battery to neutralise them. Between Polygon Wood and Broodseinde 46th Siege Bty moved two of its guns forward, close to the Menin Road, but the other two were in the workshops for repairs.

These limited attacks on the Gheluvelt Plateau had been successful, but now the weather broke. For the Battle of Poelcappelle (9 October) any CB fire was hampered by poor observation conditions, while the infantry struggling through the mud made little headway. As the offensive continued the tables were turned: British batteries were clearly observable from the Passchendaele Ridge and were subjected to CB fire, while their own guns sank into the mud and became difficult to aim and fire. Even the batteries well behind the lines such as 46th Siege Bty suffered a steady trickle of casualties and damage. Following the First Battle of Passchendaele 46th Siege Bty came under the command of 24th HAG on 15 October. The battery now took part in barrages to support the continuing attacks, and firing on strongpoints such as Gheluvelt Chateau. On 30 October the battery's OP party was gassed and evacuated to hospital, and next day the battery was shelled all day. That evening, while the Second Battle of Passchendaele was continuing, it was ordered to pull out its guns and go for rest. In the mud and under shellfire it took six days to pull out the guns, and some stores and transport were destroyed.

=== Winter 1917–18 ===
On 7 November the battery went into rest billets at Arques under 31st HAG until 2 December. It was then posted to Third Army and entrained with three of its howitzers at Doullens, arriving at Cartigny to join 6th HAG on 6 December. It emplaced its guns and registered them on Hindenburg Line outposts such as Villers-Guislain. Then on 16 December the battery was withdrawn once more and sent to XVII Corps in the Arras area. On arrival it joined 19th HAG on 18 December, got its three serviceable howitzers into positions in Feuchy, and resumed routine CB tasks when the weather permitted observation.

By now HAG allocations were becoming more fixed, and during December 1917 they were converted into permanent RGA brigades once more. For the rest of the war the battery was the heavy element in 19th (9.2-inch Howitzer) Brigade, RGA, along with three 6-inch howitzer batteries.

46th Siege Bty received and mounted a new No 4 gun at the end of January and registered it on a hostile battery with the help of the sound ranging section. By now the battery was disposed in a forward and a rear section; the rear section became silent and hidden, though the forward section at Feuchy was regularly under fire from gas and high explosive shells. During January and February Maj Bassett twice took temporary command of 19th Bde before himself going to England on a course.

=== Spring Offensive ===
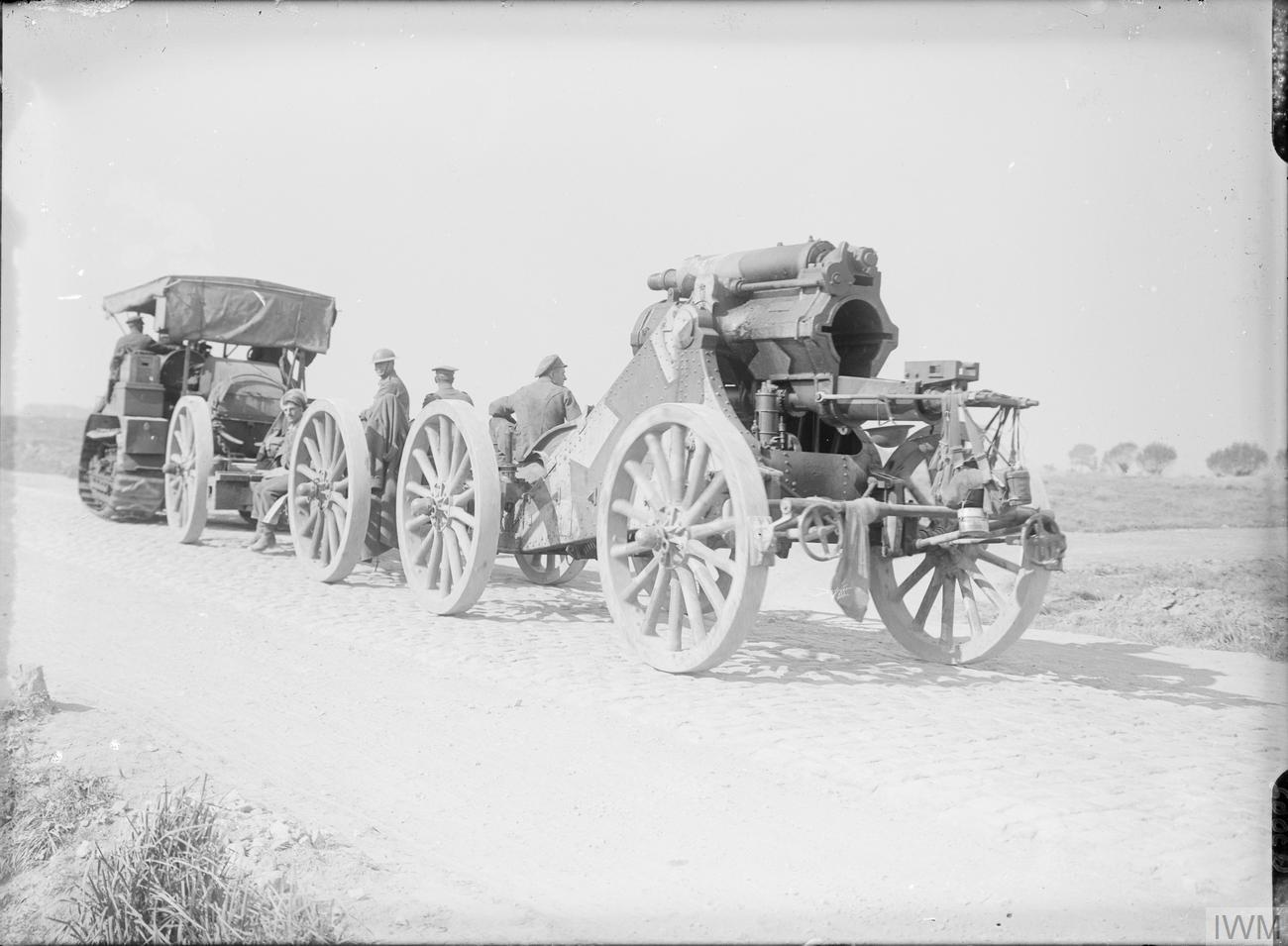
9.2-inch howitzer broken down into three loads for road movement.

The Germans launched their long-expected Spring Offensive against Third and Fifth Armies on 21 March. In the Arras sector this was restricted to heavy bombardment, including severe gas shelling of Feuchy. 46th Siege Bty suffered one gun of its forward section put out of action and a number of casualties. 19th Brigade carried out some pre-arranged SOS shoots to assist the neighbouring VI Corps to the south. The following day its batteries fired continuously, harassing enemy roads and batteries, and in the afternoon firing at masses of Germans preparing to attack VI Corps, which had to give some ground under heavy pressure. Meanwhile, Feuchy was still being shelled and 46th Siege Bty's forward position was vacated, the guns coming into action again at Spider Corner, still under fire. Overnight VI Corps had to fall back to its third line trenches because of the disaster further south, where the 'Great Retreat' was under way. Throughout the morning of 23 March the batteries continued shelling enemy-held trenches, roads, and bodies of troops around Monchy-le-Preux, which had been abandoned the previous day. The pressure on VI and XVII Corps had eased, but the gas shelling of Feuchy was now so bad that 46th Siege Bty was ordered to vacate the village and Spider Corner and fall back to the St Nicholas suburb of Arras.

XVII Corps' front was relatively quiet over the next few days, but on 28 March a new phase of the German offensive was launched at Arras itself, beginning with a heavy bombardment of the British battery positions from 03.00. 46th Siege Bty back in its new position escaped this shelling. As the infantry battle moved closer, 19th Bde was ordered to pull back, and 46th Siege Bty gave up its positions at St Nicholas to 288th Siege Bty, parking its 9.2-inch howitzers and transport by the road from St Vaast to Louez behind Arras. However, the attack on Arras failed, and on 30 March 46th Siege Bty was ordered to return to St Nicholas. It got three guns mounted next day and joined in the brigade's retaliatory fire.

Major Bassett returned to the command at the beginning of April and the second-in-command, Capt H.B. Turner, was promoted to command 297th Siege Bty (he was killed a month later). A reorganisation of the front saw 19th Bde come under First Army, but the Arras sector was not involved in the next German attack, the Battle of the Lys, which involved only the northern part of the Army. On 22 April 46th Siege Bty handed over St Nicholas to 69th Siege Bty and moved to new positions at Anzin, north of Arras. Apart from routine retaliatory fire and providing cover for trench raids, the spring of 1918 was quiet and the batteries serviced their guns. During July 46th Siege Bty increasingly participated in CB shoots.

=== Hundred Days Offensive ===
The Allied launched their Hundred Days Offensive on 8 August. Third Army joined in at the Battle of Albert on 21 August, and 19th Bde fired in support of the neighbouring VI Corps. Canadian Corps then replaced XVII Corps on the Arras front in preparation for the Battle of the Scarpe, beginning on 26 August. All of 19th Bde's batteries were engaged from Zero at 03.00, firing on barrage lines as 2nd and 3rd Canadian Divisions captured Orange Hill. The lighter 6-inch batteries then moved up behind the advance. The attack continued over the next two days as the Canadians closed up to the Drocourt-Quéant (D–Q) Switch Line. The lighter howitzers continued to move forward, and 46th Siege Bty got one of its 9.2s forward on 28 August, but was getting left behind. By the end of the month the battery had its guns parked, awaiting orders to move. On 2 September it took part in the CB programme supporting the Canadian attack on the D–Q Line, at the end of which 19th HAG reverted to XVII Corps in Third Army, covering the area between the Scarpe and Sensée rivers. 46th Siege Bty moved up to Boiry-Notre-Dame.

The Allies now planned a coordinated series of attacks against the Hindenburg Line, with Third Army joining in on 27 September (the Battle of the Canal du Nord). All the batteries fired from Zero (05.30), with 46th Siege Bty firing all day to neutralise hostile batteries. The Germans now began to retire all along the line and XVII Corps advanced towards Cambrai, which it encircled and captured on 8–9 October. However, while the 19th Bde's 6-inch batteries could keep up with the advance, 46th Siege Bty was left behind, parked at Dury. Only on 4 November, during the Battle of the Sambre, did the battery receive orders to move up from Dury to Lourches, which it did with three guns (the caterpillar tractor of the other gun being out of action for two days). However, it was engaged in no further action and was still parked at Lourches when the Armistice with Germany came into force on 11 November.

The Commonwealth War Graves Commission (CWGC) lists 11 members of the battery who died during the war, but others were probably recorded simply as 'RGA'.

== Postwar ==
As 19th HAG moved forward into Belgium, 46th Siege Bty got its guns up to Quiévrain and rejoined the brigade. Here the gunners were put in charge of a supply dump until they moved back to Marchiennes, where the brigade was billeted for the winter. Demobilisation of key workers began in mid-December. Major Bassett was sent to command the RGA base depot at Le Havre and Maj J.W. Parker from 288th Siege Bty took over command, and also acted as brigade commander from mid-March. Demobilisation gathered pace during February 1919 until the batteries were reduced to cadre strength and returned to the UK.

On 19 April 1919 the cadre of 46th Siege Bty joined the personnel of 47th Siege Bty at Newtownards in County Down to form a new 46th Bty, RGA, in the Regular Army. The new battery, part of 12th Brigade at Dundalk, was held to reconstitute the prewar No 17 Company RGA. On 4 May 1920 they were redesignated as 19th Medium Bty in 5th Medium Bde. The battery transferred to 1st Medium Bde in August 1923, then became an independent battery in January 1927.

On 1 April 1927 19th Medium Bty was included in a newly-formed 6th Medium Bde. On the outbreak of World War II the brigade (now termed 6th Medium Regiment) was serving in India with 19th Med Bty detached with Northern Force. 19th Medium Bty was sent to Iraqforce independently in June 1941. It was moved to Ninth Army in Palestine in June 1943 and then on 20 October it was broken up to help convert 26th Defence Regiment, RA, into 26th Medium Regiment.

== See also ==
Newsreel film of a 9.2-inch howitzer being fired.
