= Elzenwalle Brasserie Cemetery =

CWGC cemetery in West Flanders, Belgium

Elzenwalle Brasserie, Voormezele
- Commonwealth War Graves Commission
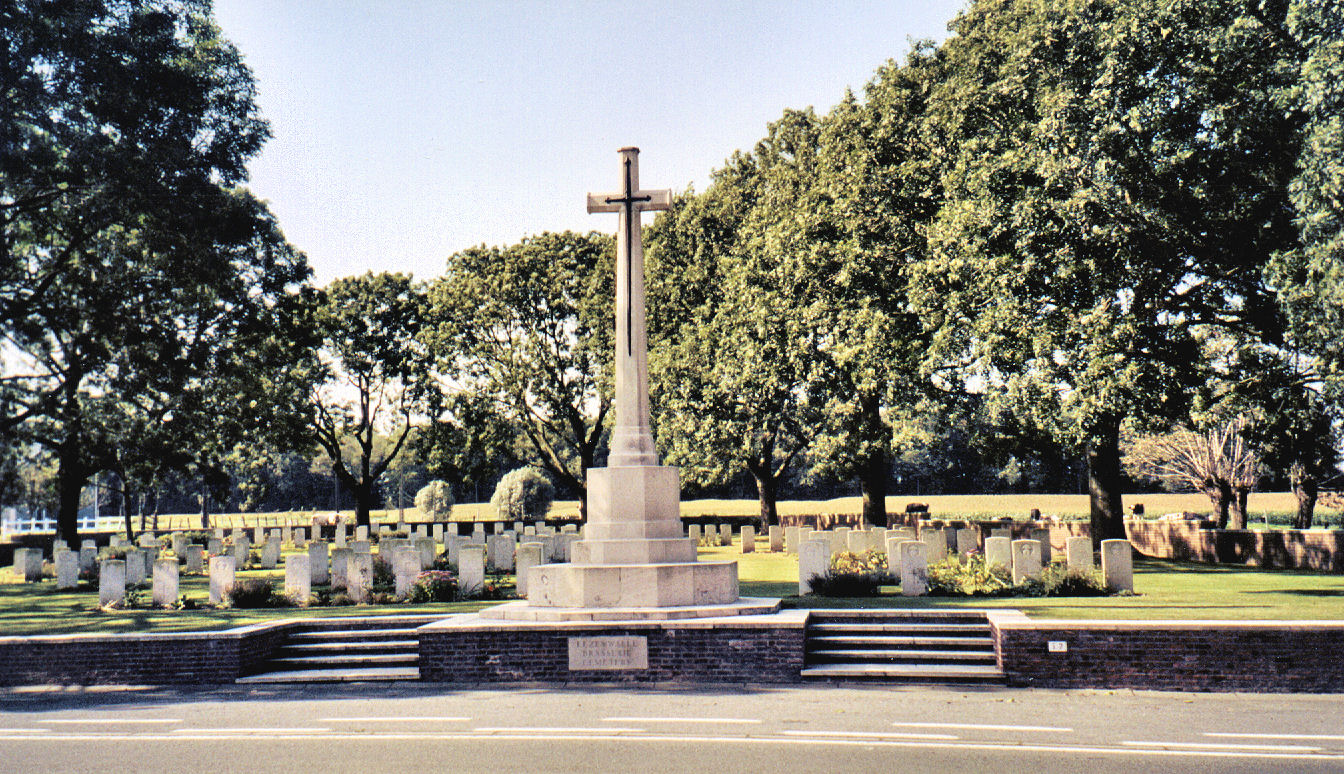
- Used for those deceased 1915–1918
- Established: February 1915
- Location: 50°48′40″N 02°51′33″E near Ypres, West Flanders, Belgium
- Designed by: G H Goldsmith
- Total burials: 144
- Unknowns: 5

Burials by nation
- Allied Powers: United Kingdom: 108; Canada: 41

Burials by war
- World War I: 149

Elzenwalle Brasserie Cemetery is a Commonwealth War Graves Commission burial ground for the dead of the First World War located near Ypres on the Western Front in Belgium.

The cemetery grounds were assigned to the United Kingdom in perpetuity by King Albert I of Belgium in recognition of the sacrifices made by the British Empire in the defence and liberation of Belgium during the war.

== Foundation ==
The cemetery takes its name from the brewery opposite. Founded in February 1915, it was formed from eight regimental burial grounds. There are between one and fourteen graves in each of these plots.

This cemetery is a prime example of regimental burial grounds created by the units defending the trenches in the area between 1915 and 1917. The graves are of individual soldiers killed holding the line of the trenches during the long stalemate of the front and the new forward line after the Battle of Messines.

The cemetery was designed by George Hartley Goldsmith.
