= Attached gas-check =

An attached gas-check was a copper plate that was physically attached to the base of a studded projectile of rifled muzzle-loading ("RML") artillery, sealing the escape of gas between the projectile and the barrel.

== Gallery ==
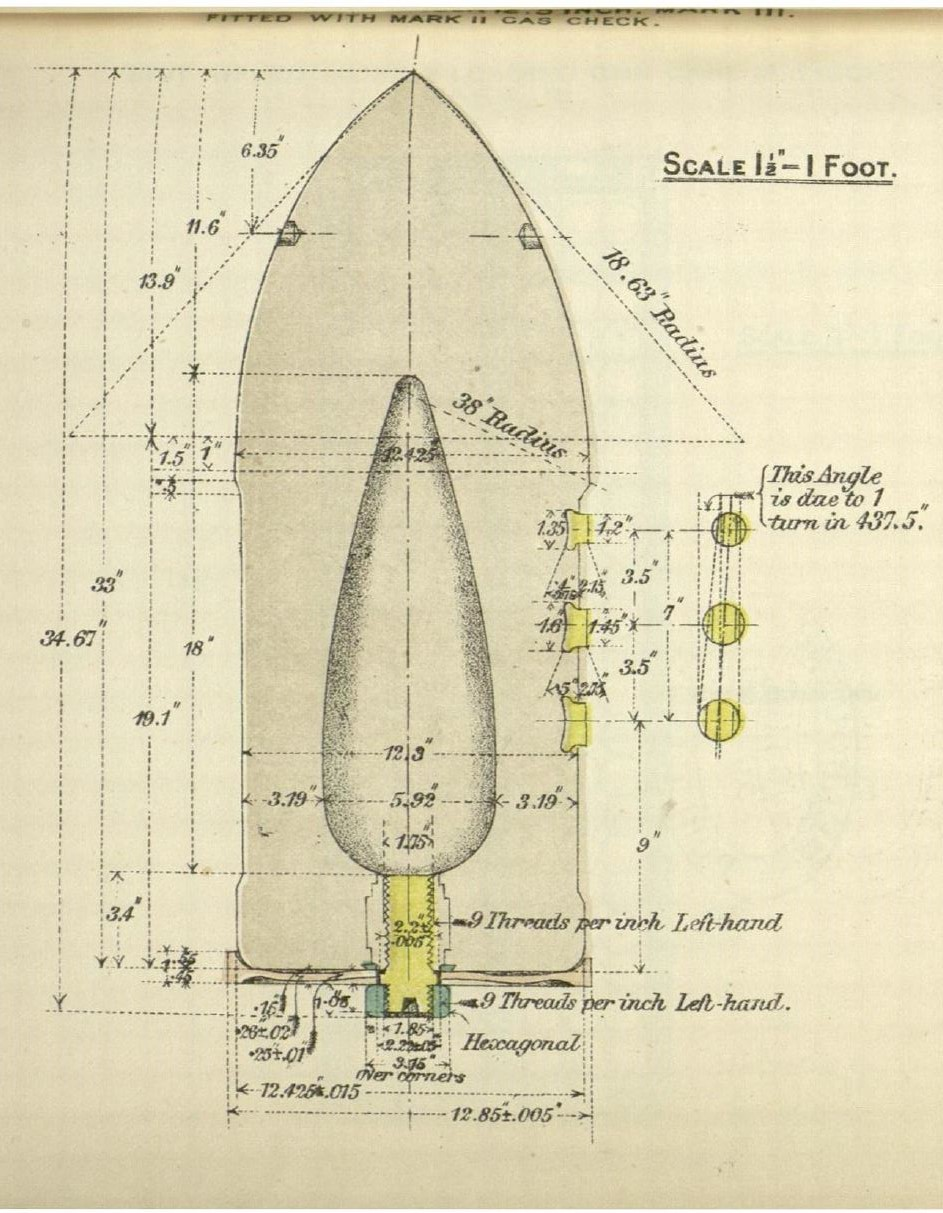
1

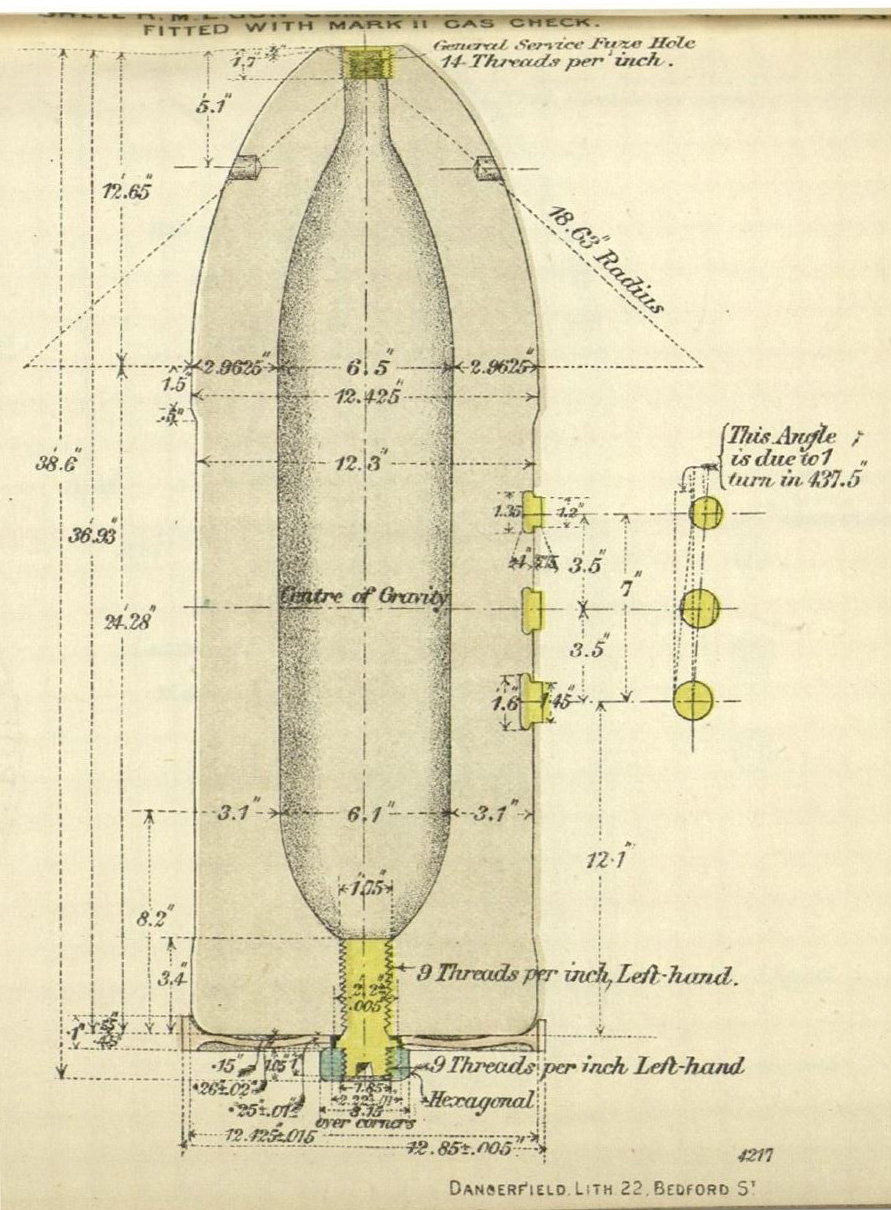
2

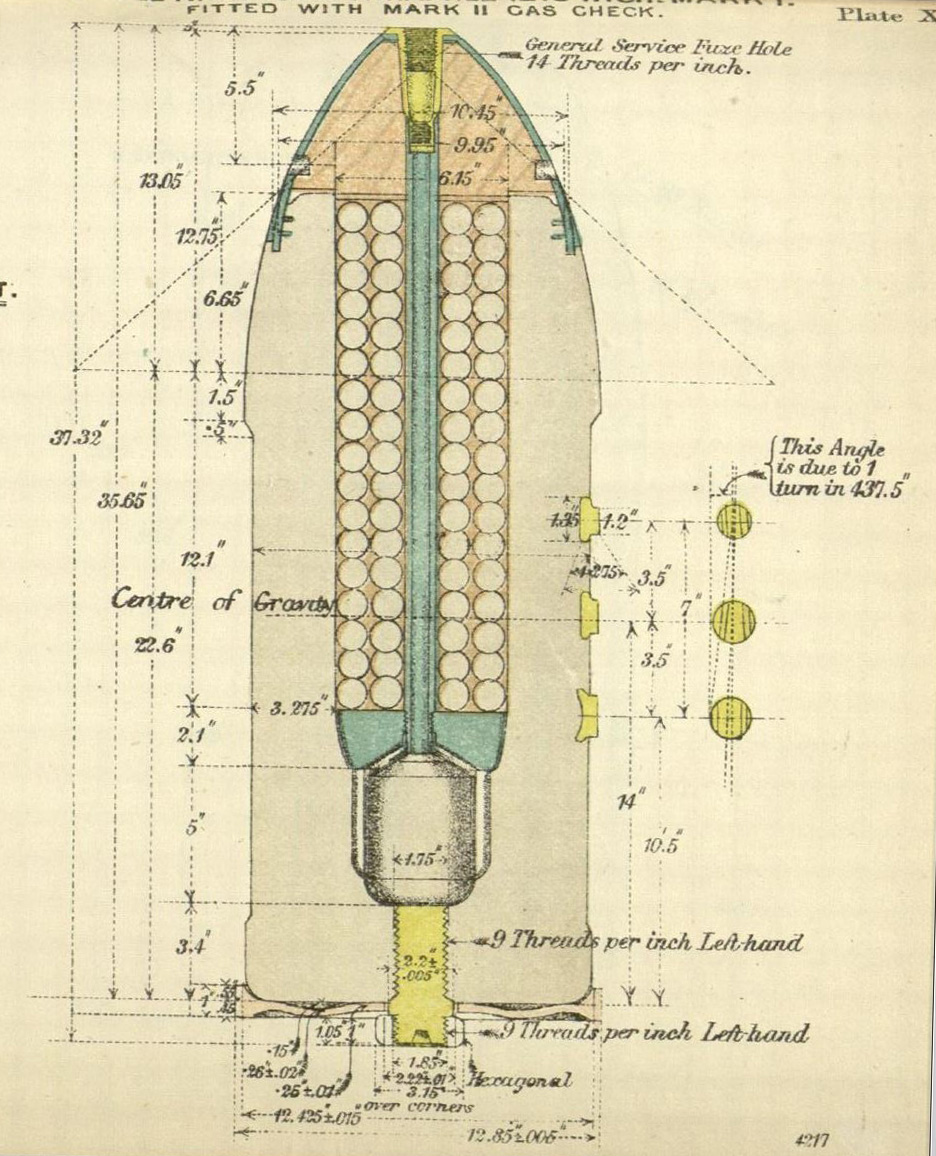
3
1. RML 12.5in Studded Palliser Shell Mk III with Attached Gas-Check Mk II
2. RML 12.5in Studded Common Shell Mk I with Attached Gas-Check Mk II
3. RML 12.5in Studded Shrapnel Shell Mk I with Attached Gas-check Mk II

== See also ==
- Gas-checks in British RML heavy guns
- Automatic gas-check
