= RML 8-inch howitzer =

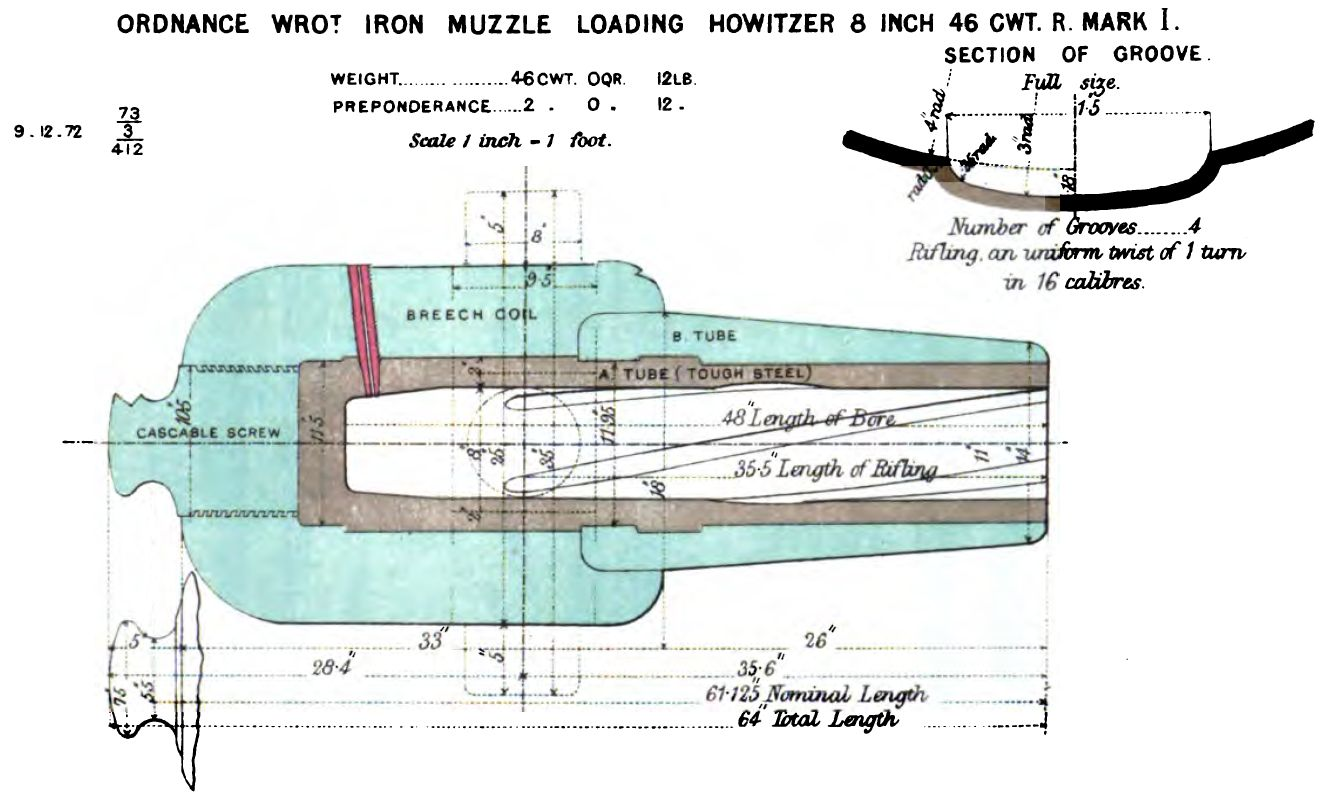
- RML 8-inch 46 cwt howitzer diagram, pub. 1879 (HMSO)
- Type: Howitzer
- Place of origin: United Kingdom

Service history
- In service: 1872–1902
- Used by: British Empire

Production history
- Designer: Woolwich Arsenal
- Manufacturer: Woolwich Arsenal
- Variants: 46 cwt Mark I and II; 70 cwt Mark I and II (Note: cwt = hundredweight =112 pounds (51 kg). Britain typically used the weight of the gun barrel rounded to nearest cwt to differentiate versions of guns with the same calibre. Hence there were versions weighing 46 hundredweight (2,337 kg) and 70 hundredweight (3,556 kg). Britain used Roman numerals to denote Marks (models) of ordnance. Mk I = Mark I, Mk II = Mark 2. Hence this article refers to the 2 models each of RML 8-inch 46 cwt and 70 cwt howitzers.)

Specifications
- Mass: 46-long-hundredweight (2,300 kg)
- Crew: 9
- Shell: 180 pounds (82 kg) (common shell); 180 pounds (82 kg) (shrapnel)
- Calibre: 8 inches (203.2 mm)
- Action: RML
- Breech: none – muzzle-loading
- Muzzle velocity: 1,330 feet per second (405 m/s)
- Effective firing range: 3,500 yards (3,200 m)

The RML 8-inch howitzer was a British Rifled, Muzzle Loading (RML) Howitzer manufactured in England in the 19th century, which fired a projectile weighing approximately 180 pounds (82 kg). It was used in siege batteries and in fortifications.

== Design and manufacture ==
The gun consisted of an 'A' tube of toughened steel, over which was shrunk a 'B' tube of wrought iron and jacket. A cascable was fitted at the end.

The original 46 cwt howitzer was rifled on the "Woolwich" pattern with 4 spiral grooves in which studs protruding from the projectile engaged to impart spin; the later 70 cwt howitzer was rifled on the "Polygroove" pattern with 24 grooves and projectiles had "Automatic gas-checks" attached to the base which engaged the grooves.

Three planes were machined on the upper surface of the Howitzer, for use with quadrants enabling it to be elevated to 30 degrees. This enabled the gun to be sighted for indirect, or direct fire.

== Ammunition ==
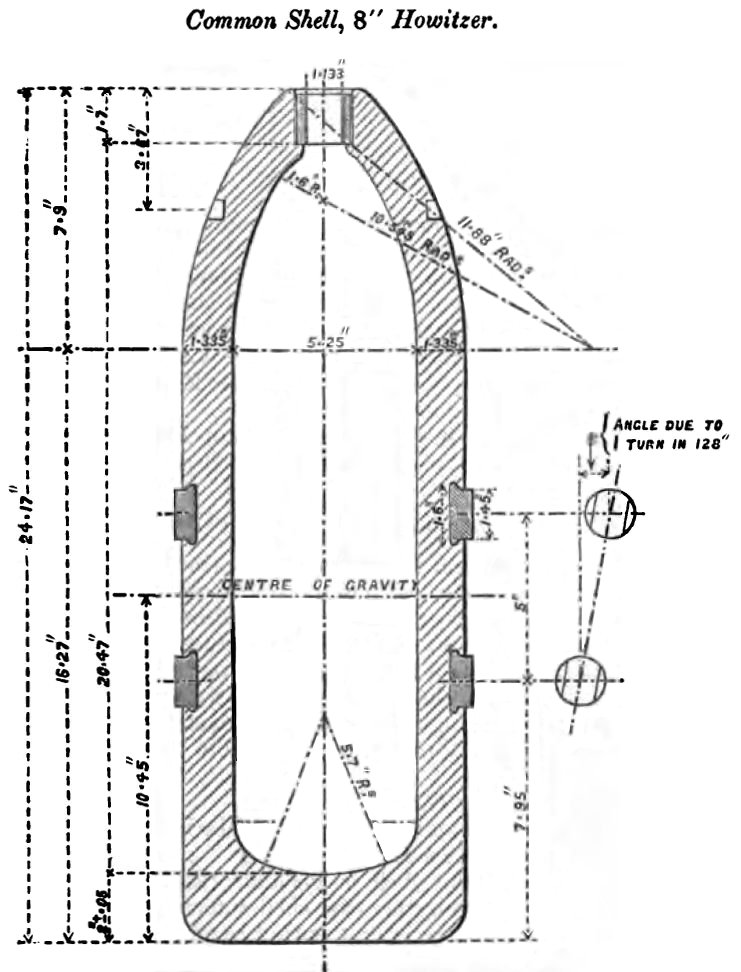
RML 8-inch 46 cwt howitzer studded common shell diagram

46- and 70 cwt guns differed in number and type of rifling grooves so studded projectiles were only available for 46 cwt guns, and different automatic gas checks were required for studless projectiles.

Guns were fired using a silk bag containing a black powder propellant. They used three types of ammunition – Common shell (for use against buildings or fortifications), shrapnel shell (for use any Infantry or Cavalry) and case shot (for close range use against 'soft' targets). Ignition was through a copper lined vent at the breech end of the gun. A copper friction tube would be inserted and a lanyard attached. When the lanyard was pulled the tube would ignite, firing the gun. A number of different fuzes could be used enabling shells to either burst at a pre-determined time (and range), or on impact. A typical rate of fire was one round per minute.

== Operation ==
The Howitzer was normally deployed in batteries of four guns. Each gun was pulled by a team of elephants. It had a crew of nine men. In addition to each gun, a limbered ammunition trailer was also deployed with each gun.

== Service history ==
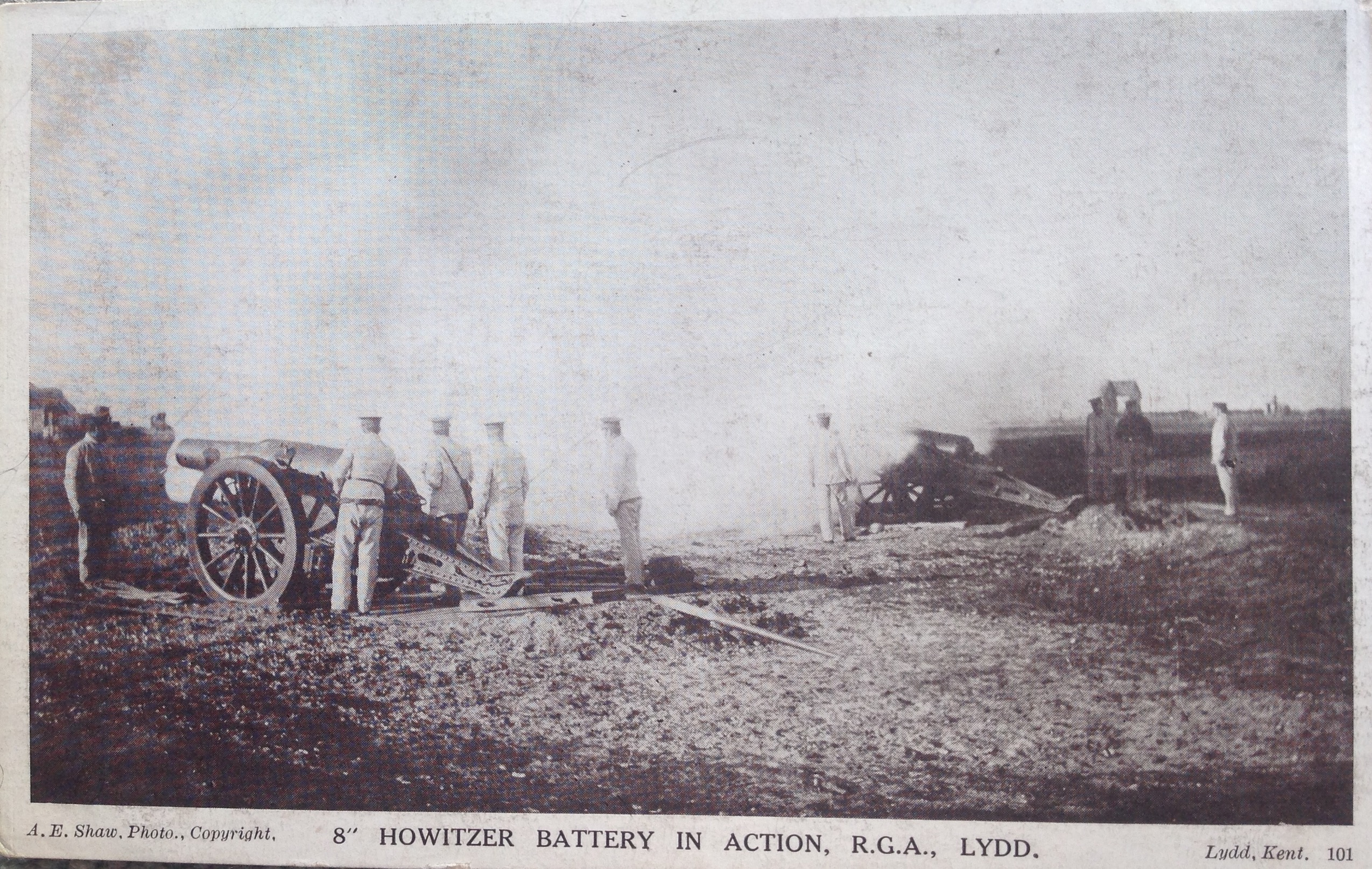
8-inch RML Howizer, Lydd, c1903

Rifled Muzzle Loading howitzers were selected by the Royal Artillery in the 1870s to replace obsolete smooth bore Mortars and howitzers, as they had great range and accuracy. They were only semi-mobile and were used by Garrison batteries of the Royal Artillery in India, drawn by elephants, or kept in fixed emplacements or fortifications. For example, by the 1890s Fort Widley had two howitzers on travelling siege carriages that could be moved to wherever they were needed.

Some were used by batteries of reserve units in the United Kingdom. The 2nd Kent Artillery Volunteers conducted practise with them at Lydd in 1903.

== See also ==
- List of howitzers

== Surviving examples ==
- A 70 cwt variant is preserved at Fort Rinella, Malta

== Bibliography ==
- Captain John F Owen R.A., "Treatise on the Construction and Manufacture of Ordnance in the British Service", Prepared in the Royal Gun Factory, London, 1877, pages 177–178, 292.
- Text Book of Gunnery, 1902. LONDON : PRINTED FOR HIS MAJESTY'S STATIONERY OFFICE, BY HARRISON AND SONS, ST. MARTIN'S LANE
