= Gas-checks in British RML heavy guns =

Gas-checks were attachments to ammunition that revolutionised the performance of RML heavy guns. The first generation of RML heavy guns began entering service in about 1865. They all had Woolwich rifling and relied on studs on the projectiles for rotation. Gas-checks were first introduced in 1878 or soon after. They significantly reduced wear on the guns while also increasing their range and accuracy. Before long, studless ammunition was being manufactured for these guns, using gas-checks for projectile rotation. Gas-checks also facilitated a switch to the second generation of RML guns which used polygroove rifling and only supported studless ammunition.

== Introduction ==
The first RML heavy guns were introduced into British service in about 1865. By 1878, 11 models of Woolwich rifled guns had been introduced, ranging from 7 inches to 12.5 inches. Unfortunately, Woolwich rifling had a major defect, namely, that hot powder gas escaping around the ammunition ("Windage") caused excessive barrel erosion, especially in the rifling grooves. Extensive research was performed in the early 1870s to find a solution, and by 1878 two types of gas-checks had been designed. Both gas-checks were made of copper with a little added zinc. They were, in effect, shallow cups of about the same diameter as the ammunition that were attached to the base of the ammunition. When the gun was fired, the powder gas pressure forced the sides of the cup into the rifling grooves, creating a gas seal. It was immediately found that gas-checks also increased the range of guns, and provided greater accuracy. It was also realised that gas-checks were capable of rotating the ammunition, removing the need for studs. This facilitated the use of polygroove rifling, which used a lot of shallow grooves, in place of the Woolwich system which used only a few deeper grooves. Polygroove rifling was less detrimental to the strength of the guns. Also, studless ammunition was stronger and flew more accurately than studded ammunition. Shell strength was particularly important for armour-piercing ammunition.

== Attached gas-checks ==
Attached gas-checks were used with the existing studded ammunition of Woolwich rifled guns. Their basic design was the same across all sizes of guns, the key difference being their diameter. The gas-check was attached to the base of the projectile by a screw-in plug which required a minor modification to each projectile. A few projectiles were unsuitable for modification, and were scrapped.

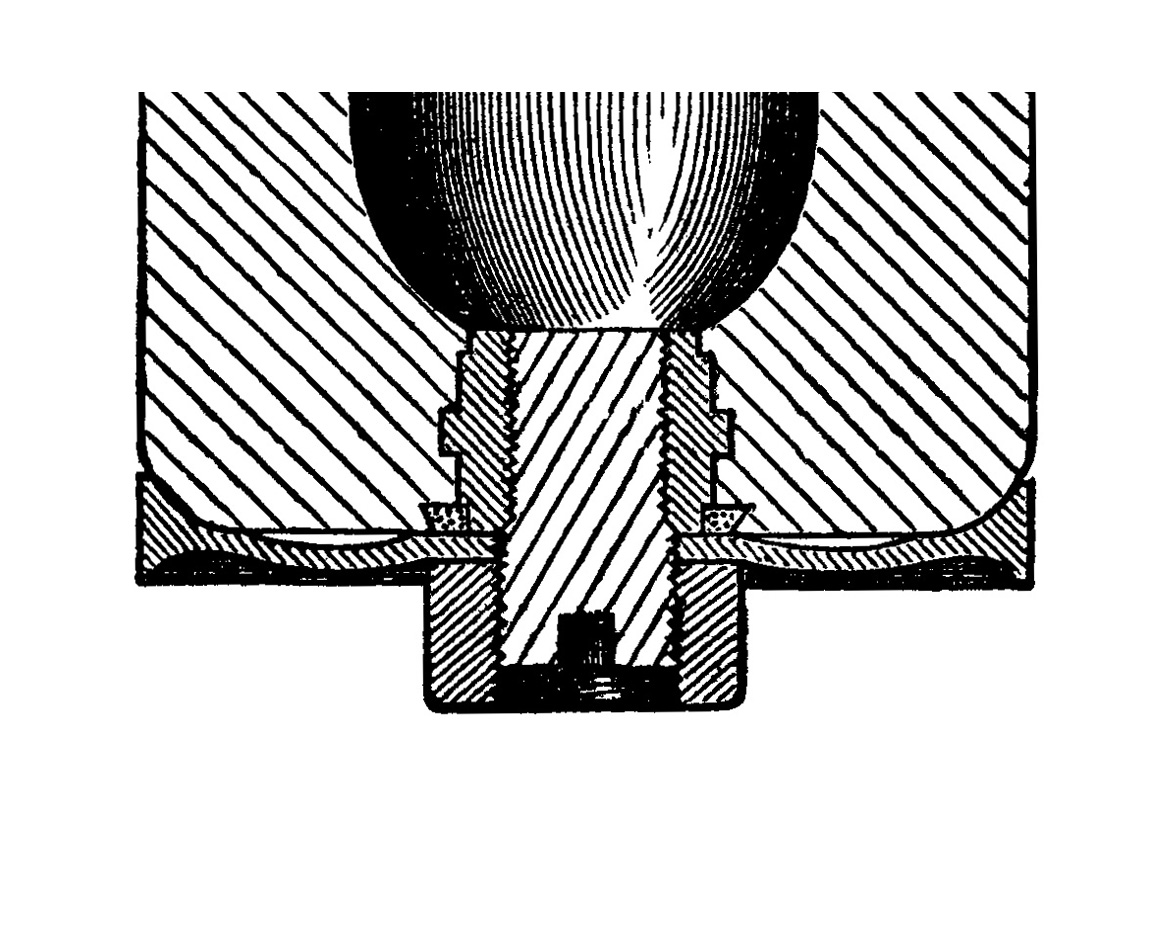
Fig 1. Attached Gas-Check Mk I.

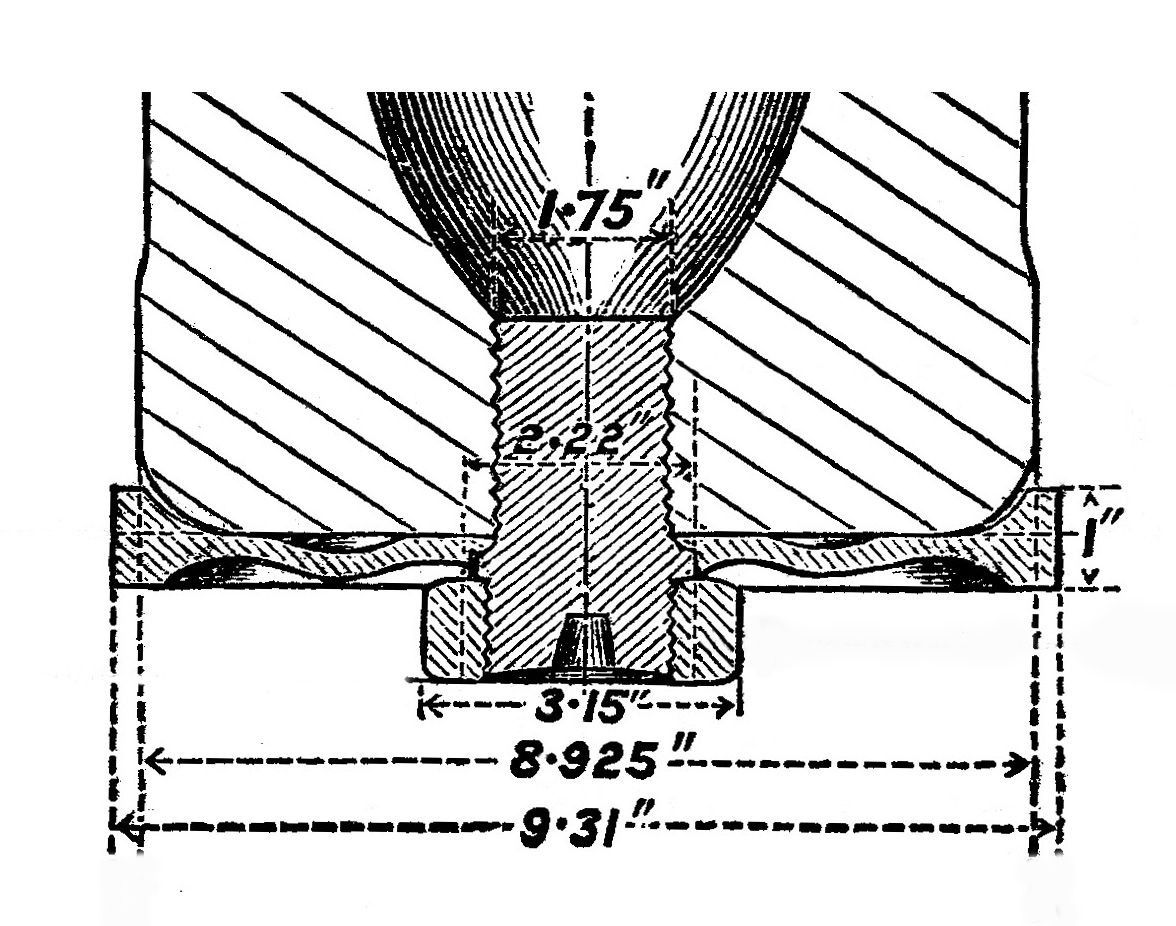
Fig 2. Attached Gas-Check Mk II.

Fig 1 shows the base of a 9-inch studded Palliser shell with attached gas-check Mk I. The gas-check consists of a wavy disc with a circular collar of the same diameter as the projectile around its edge. On firing, the intense powder gas pressure flattened the disc against the base of the projectile, increasing the disc’s overall diameter, and forcing the collar against and into the rifling, forming a gas seal. The Mk I gas-check performed well for the faster burning R.L.G. powder with which it was initially tested, but was found to seal the grooves too slowly with slower burning powders such as P and P^{2}, resulting in scoring of the bottoms of grooves. As a result, the Mk I gas-check was superseded by the Mk II gas-check by 1881. Fig 2 shows a 9-inch studded common shell with a Mk II gas-check. The Mk II gas-check was virtually identical to the Mk I, the main difference being that the collar had projections that fitted into the grooves on loading and resulted in faster gas sealing on firing.

== Automatic gas-checks ==
Automatic gas-checks were used with studless ammunition in both Woolwich and polygroove rifled guns. They were otherwise known as “Rotating Gas-Checks” or “EOC Gas-Checks”. They were called "automatic" because they could be loaded into the barrel separately from the projectile, and automatically became firmly attached to the projectile on firing. They were called rotating gas-checks because they were able to rotate the projectile, enabling the use of studless projectiles. They were called EOC gas-checks, because they were developed by the Armstrong company which owned EOC.

Automatic gas-checks were designed to be inserted into the barrel separately from, and before, the projectile, so that the gas-check would become located on the base of the projectile, but not attached to it, during ramming. On firing it became firmly attached to the projectile, and remained firmly attached all the way to the target. As an alternative to loading the gas-check separately, it was also sometimes permissible to pre-attach the gas-check to the projectile before loading.

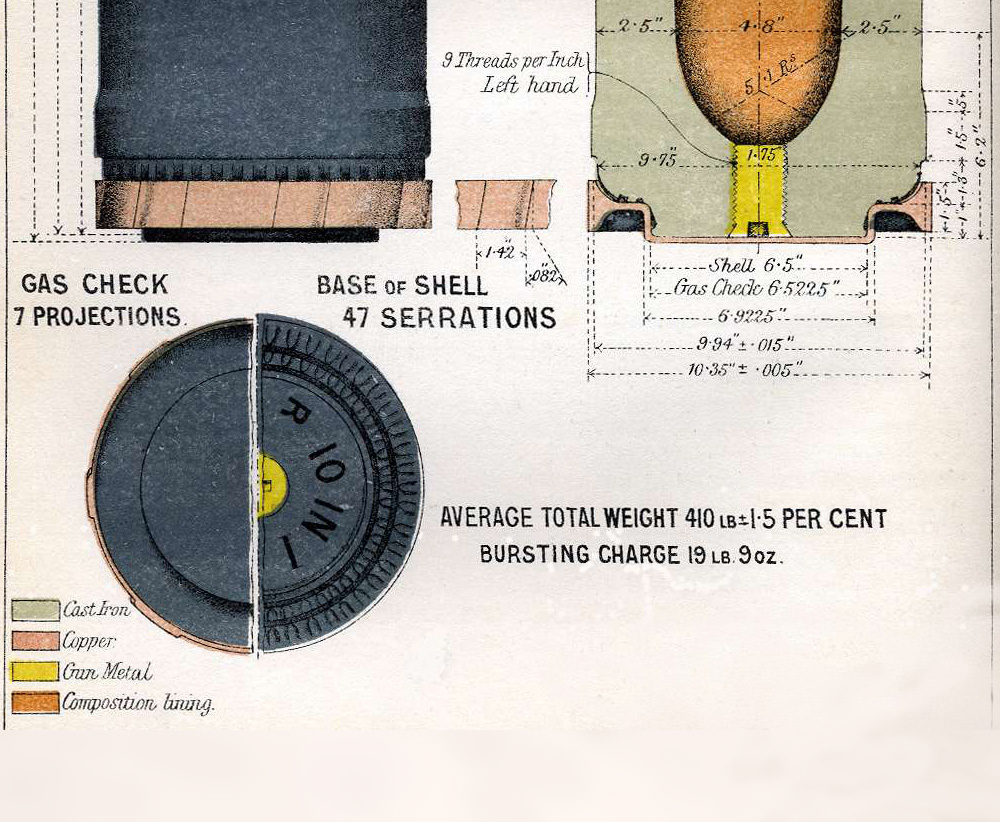
Fig 3. Protrusion is part of shell.

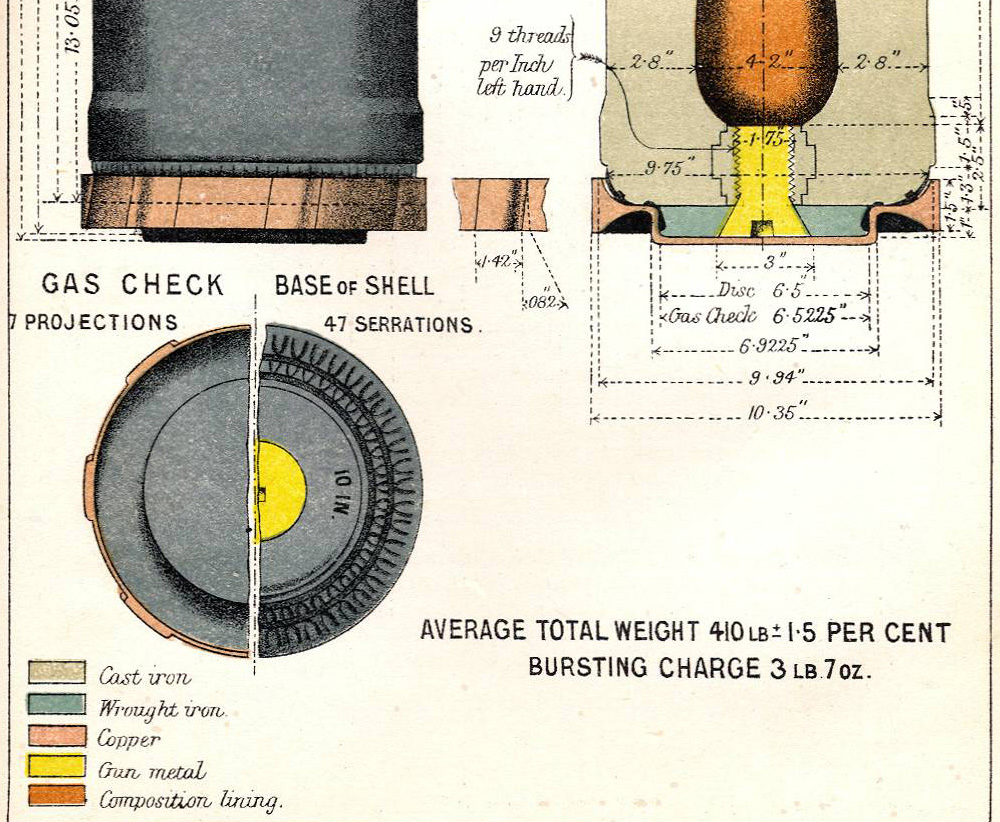
Fig 4. Protrusion is wrought-iron disk.

Fig 3 shows the base of a 10-inch studless common shell Mk I with automatic gas-check in place but not attached i.e. as it would be in the gun after ramming but before firing. The centre of the base of the projectile has a circular flat-topped protrusion with undercut sides. The outside of the base is curved and covered with two circular grooves and 47 tapered radial ridges. The collar has 7 projections corresponding to the rifling grooves. On firing, the powder gas pressure forces the copper gas-check into the undercut in the side of the protrusion, the two circular grooves, and the 47 gaps between the tapered radial ridges, permanently attaching the gas-check to the shell. The gas pressure also forces the collar outwards against the rifling, creating a gas seal. The radial ridges prevent rotation of the gas-check on the base of the projectile, forcing the projectile to rotate.

Fig 4 shows a 10-inch studless Palliser shell Mk II with automatic gas-check. The gas-check is the same as the one in Fig 3. However, in contrast to Fig 3, the protrusion on the base of the shell in Fig 4 is not part of the shell, but is instead a wrought iron disc attached to the shell by the screw plug. Initially, all studless shells 9–17.72 inches, including Palliser shells, were made in one piece as in Fig 3. These shells were identified as Mark I. However, it was found that casting Palliser shells in brittle metal in one piece was extremely difficult, especially for smaller calibres, and that the protrusions were liable to chipping during handling. As a result, later Palliser shells 9–12.5 inches were made in two pieces as in Fig 4, and identified as Mark II. The separate protrusions were made from wrought iron, cast steel or malleable cast iron.

Some Woolwich groove guns had 2 marks of automatic gas-checks. The changes to Mark I mainly involved shaving metal off parts of the projections to make them bend more precisely and rapidly into the Woolwich grooves, sealing the grooves faster.

In general, all marks of a particular gun shared the same studless ammunition. Also, the studless ammunition for a particular gun used the same automatic gas-check, except for 9 inch and 10 inch guns which had some marks with Woolwich rifling, and others with polygroove. In these cases there was one automatic gas-check for all Woolwich marks, and a different automatic gas-check for all polygroove marks. The 8 inch 46 cwt and 70 cwt howitzers shared the same studless ammunition, but required different automatic gas-checks for their Woolwich and polygroove rifling respectively.

== Gallery ==
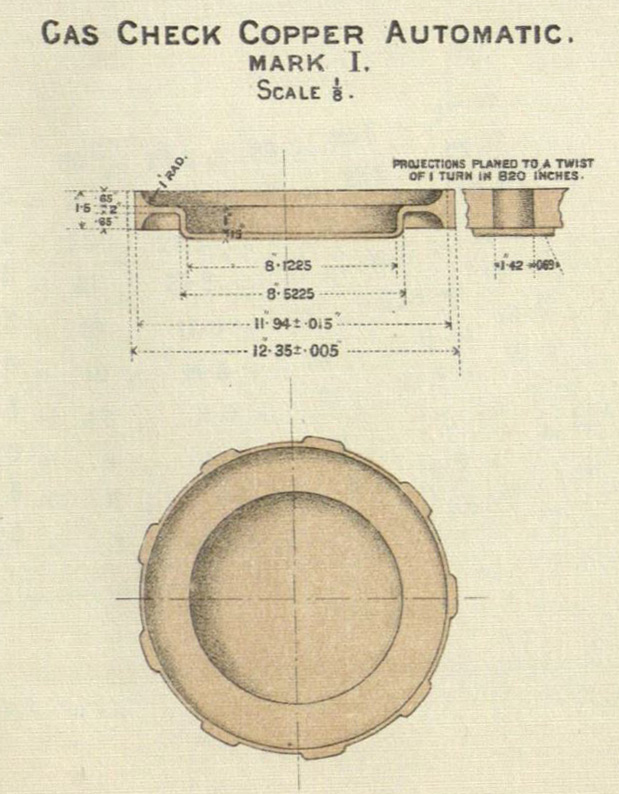
1

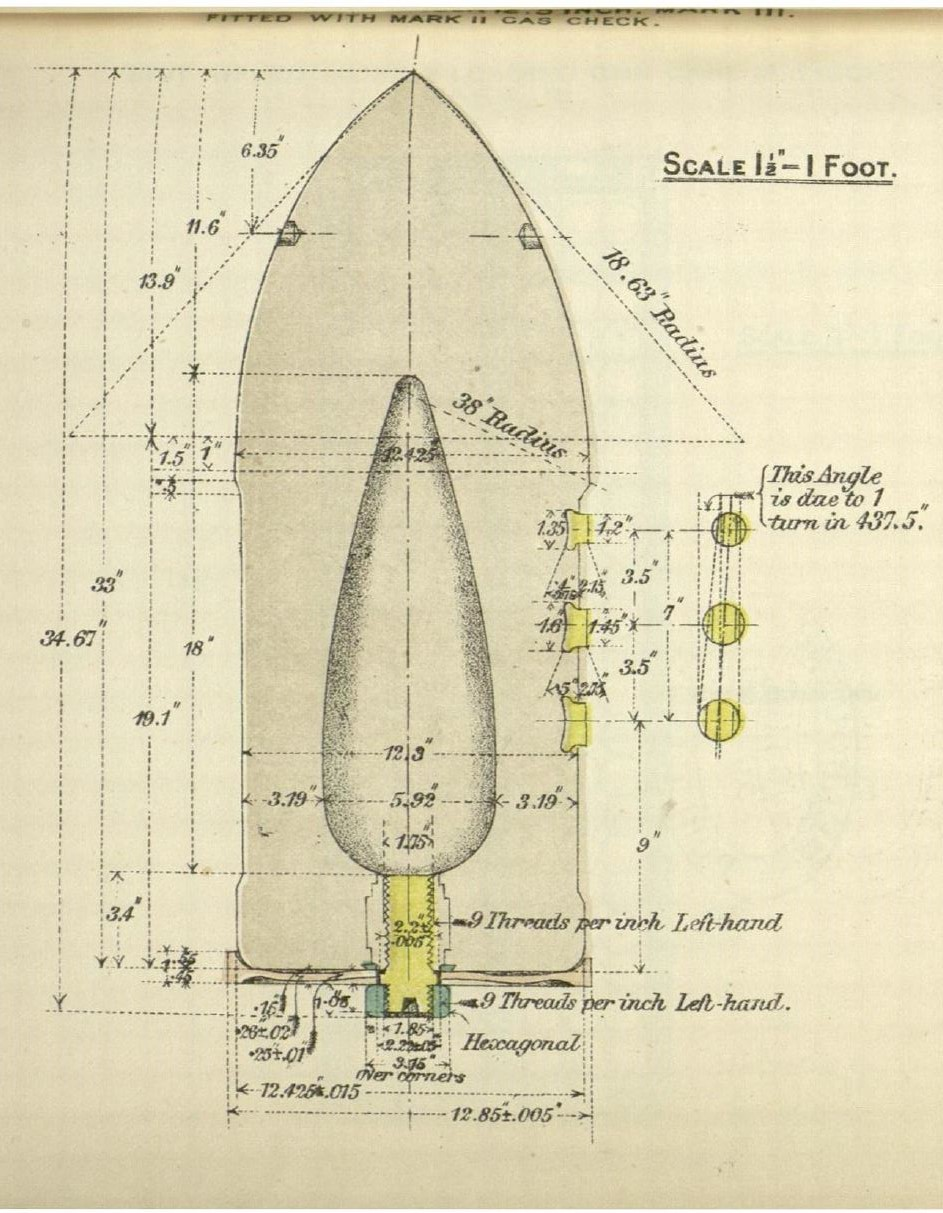
2

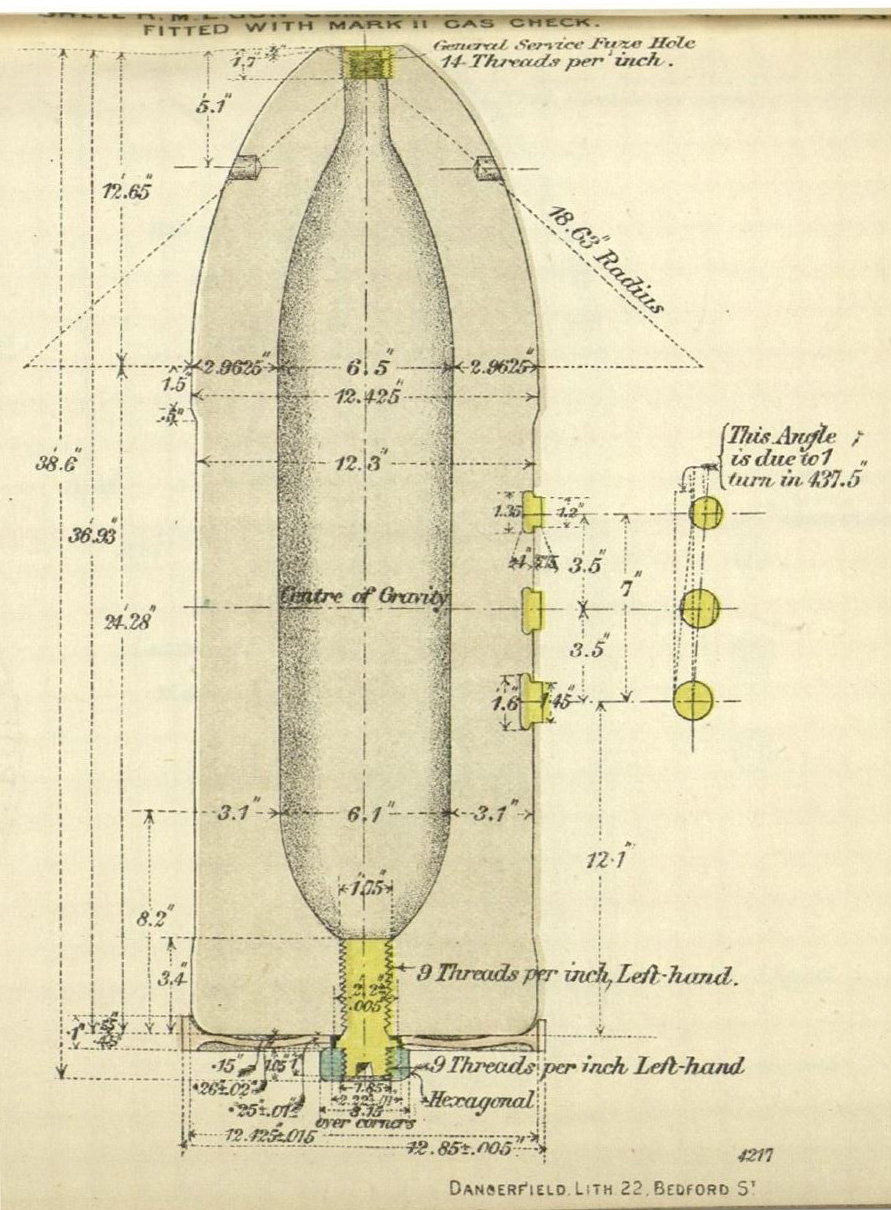
3

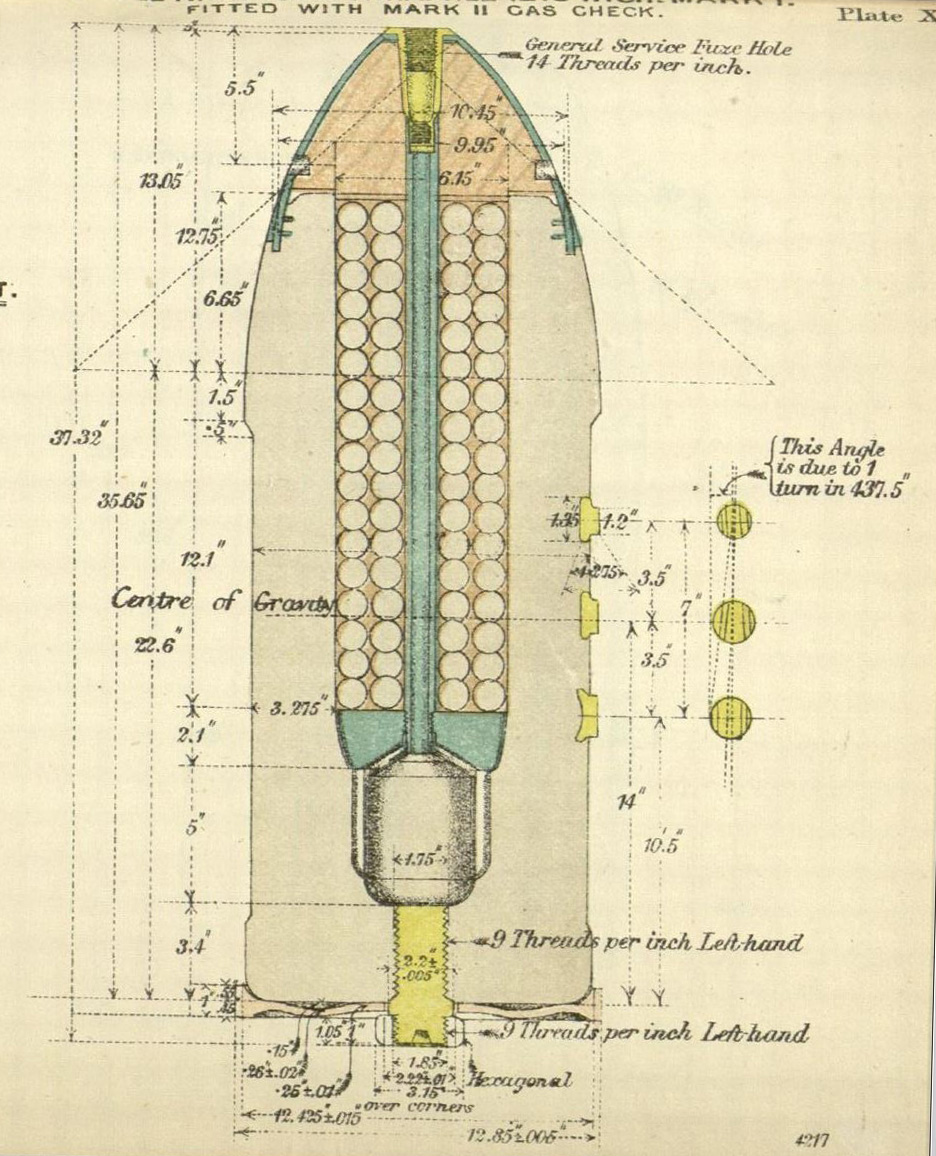
4

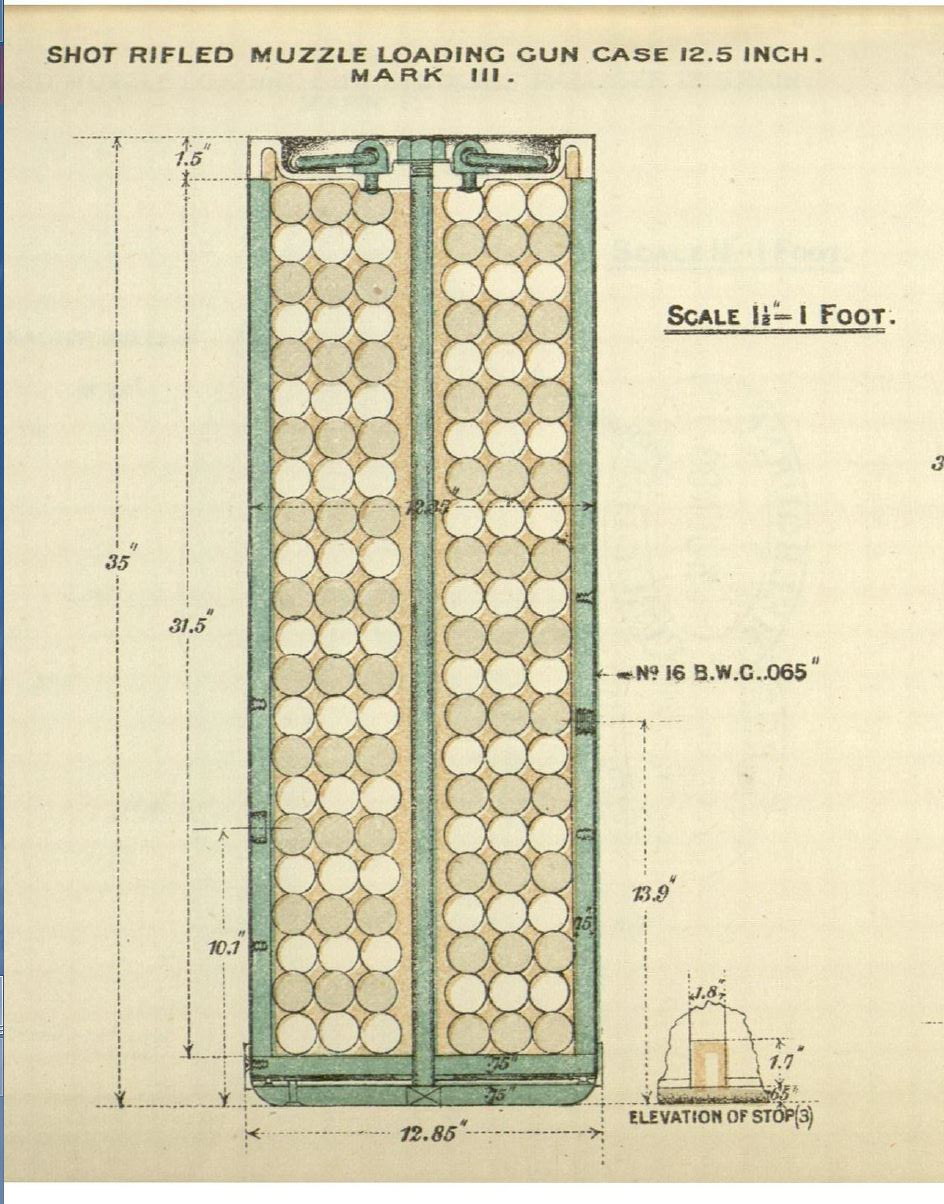
5

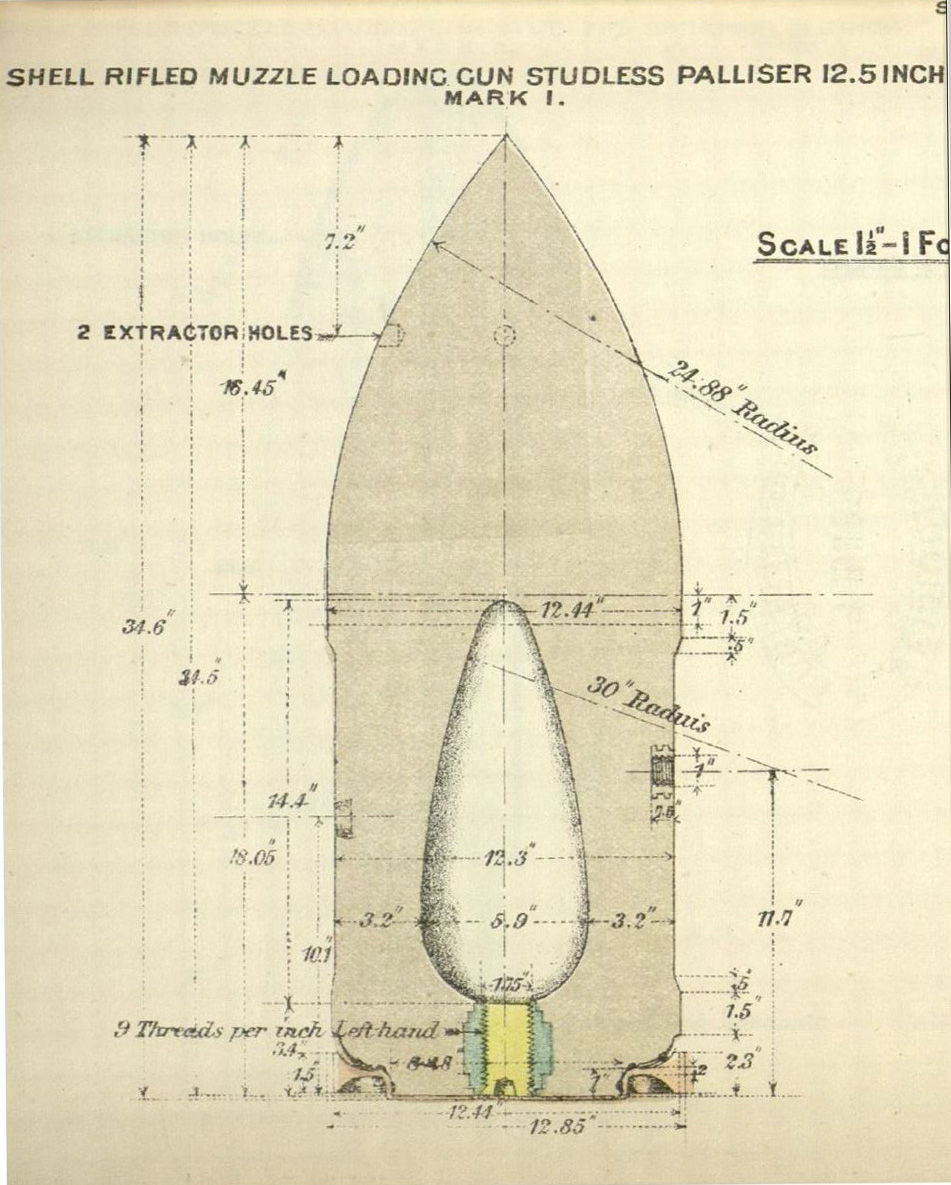
6

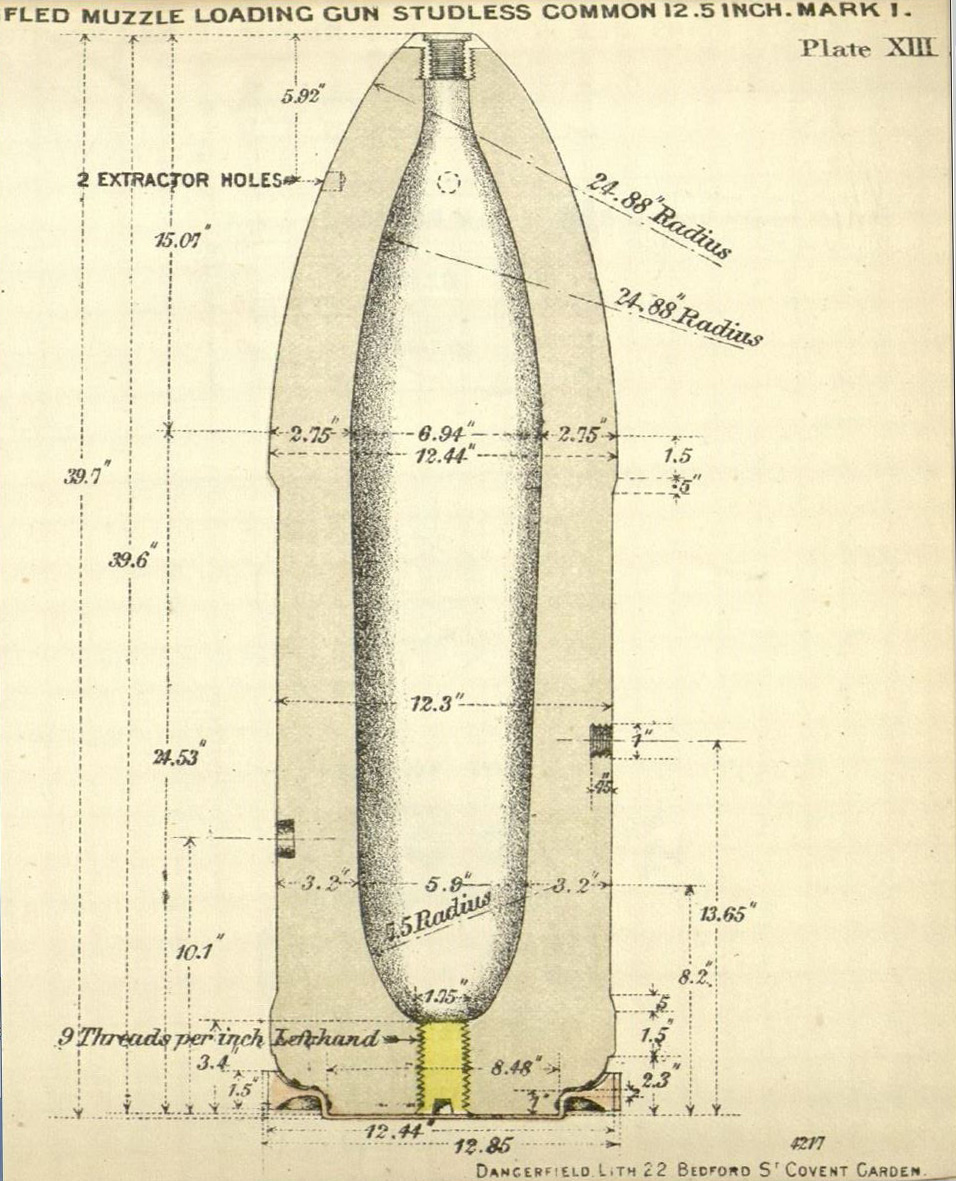
7

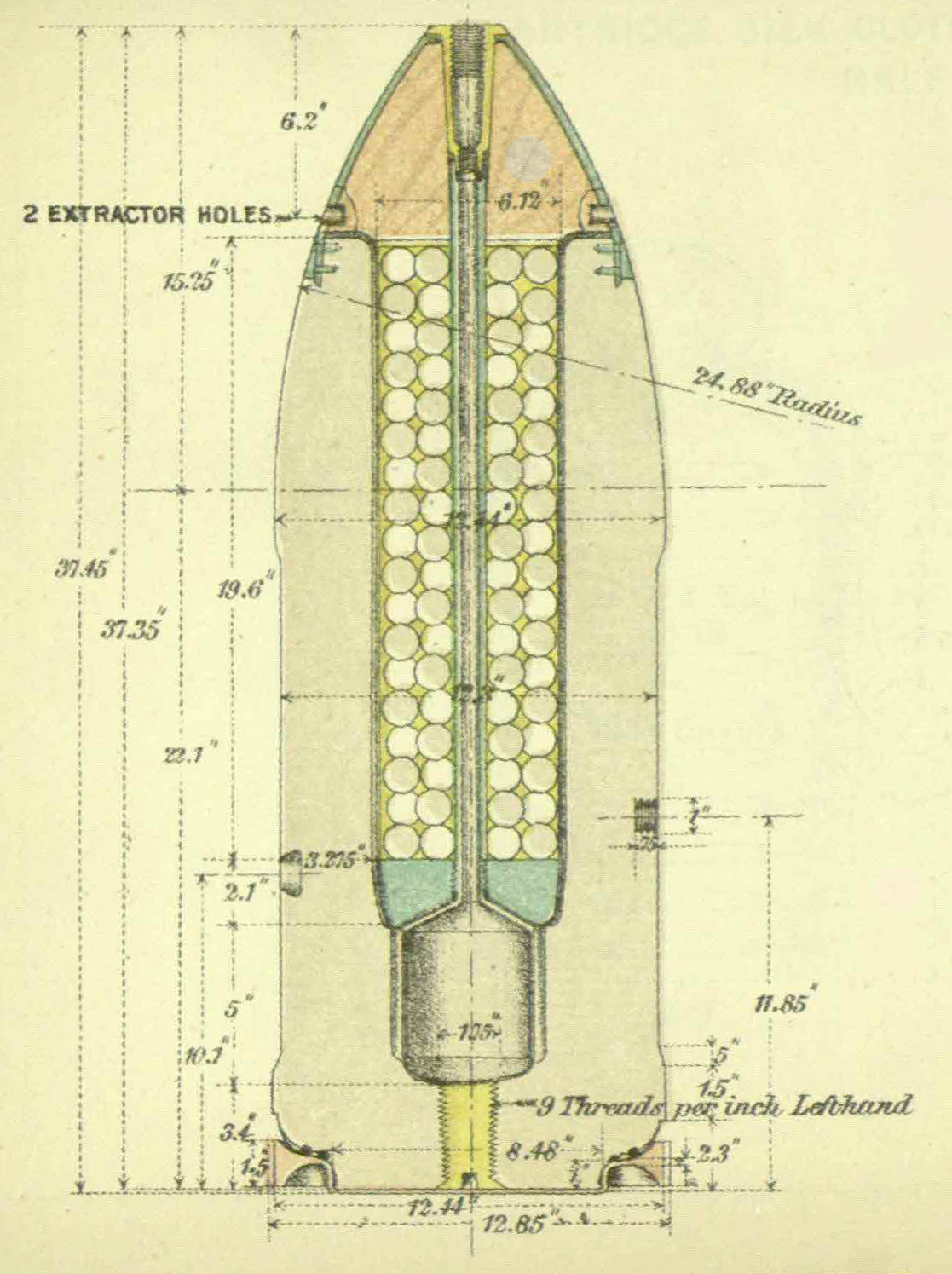
8
1. RML 12in Automatic Gas-Check Mk I
2. RML 12.5in Studded Palliser Shell Mk III with Attached Gas-Check Mk II
3. RML 12.5in Studded Common Shell Mk I with Attached Gas-Check Mk II
4. RML 12.5in Studded Shrapnel Shell Mk I with Attached Gas-check Mk II
5. RML 12.5in Case Shot Mk III
6. RML 12.5in Studless Palliser Shell Mk I with Automatic Gas-Check
7. RML 12.5in Studless Common Shell Mk I with Automatic Gas-Check
8. RML 12.5in Studless Shrapnel Shell Mk I with Automatic Gas-check

Images 2–8 show the range of ammunition for the RML 12.5 inch gun in 1885. This range is typical of the ammunition in use with Woolwich-grooved guns of 9 inches or larger after the mid-1880s. These guns no longer fired studded ammunition without gas-checks. Instead there were two sets of ammunition available, namely: older studded ammunition with attached gas-checks Mk II, and newer studless ammunition with automatic gas-checks. Case ammunition was neither studded nor required gas-checks.

== Summary table ==
The table summarises the types of projectiles in service with RML heavy guns in 1902, (and probably, by the late 1880s for the guns existing at that time). All polygroove guns exclusively fired studless projectiles with automatic gas-checks. All Woolwich groove guns except 7 inch guns, fired both studded and studless projectiles. The studded projectiles had attached gas-checks while the studless projectiles had automatic gas-checks. The 8 inch gun only fired one studless projectile, a studless pointed common shell. The 7 inch guns fired exclusively studded projectiles without gas-checks.

Model	Rifling		Stud/Gas-Check Combinations		
Model	Type	Grooves	Studded without Gas-Check	Studded with Attached Gas-Check	Studless with Automatic Gas-Check
17.72 inch	Polygroove	28			Y
16 inch	Polygroove	33			Y
12.5 inch	Woolwich	9		Y	Y
12 inch 35 ton	Woolwich	9		Y	Y
12 inch 25 ton	Woolwich	9		Y	Y
11 inch	Woolwich	9		Y	Y
10.4 inch 28 ton	Polygroove	21			Y
10 inch 18 ton Marks I & II	Woolwich	7		Y	Y
10 inch 12 ton Marks III & IV	Polygroove	32			Y
9 inch Marks I-V	Woolwich	6		Y	Y
9 inch Mark VI LS	Polygroove	27			Y
8 inch 9 ton gun	Woolwich	4		Y	Y
8 inch 70 cwt howitzer	Polygroove	24			Y
8 inch 46 cwt howitzer	Woolwich	4		Y	Y
7 inch 7 ton	Woolwich	3	Y		
7 inch 6.5 ton	Woolwich	3	Y		
7 inch 90 cwt	Woolwich	3	Y		

== Brief chronology ==
- 1865–1878 All models and marks of RML heavy guns with Woolwich rifling entered service. All models and marks entering service following this period had polygroove rifling.
- 1879–1881 Most existing studded projectiles of 9 inches or larger were modified to take an attached gas-check. A few projectiles were unsuitable for modification and were scrapped.
- 1879–1882 Manufacturing of studded projectiles terminated for all guns of 9 inches or larger, but this does not imply stocks of studded projectiles had been exhausted.
- 1880–1881 Attached gas-check Mk I was superseded by attached gas-check Mk II which introduced projections to fit into the rifling grooves.
- 1879–1884 Studless projectiles became available for all guns 9 inches or larger.
- 1905 RML guns with Woolwich rifling were either obsolete or obsolescent. Ref 1905 states that of the RML heavy guns introduced up to 1879, the ones "considered to be worth manning in time of war" were 12.5, 10 and 9 inches.
