= Rotating gas-check =

A rotating gas-check (more commonly known as an automatic gas-check) was a copper plate that automatically attached itself to a specially designed studless projectile of rifled muzzle-loading ("RML") artillery, sealing the escape of gas between the projectile and the barrel and imparting axial rotation to the projectile.

== Gallery ==
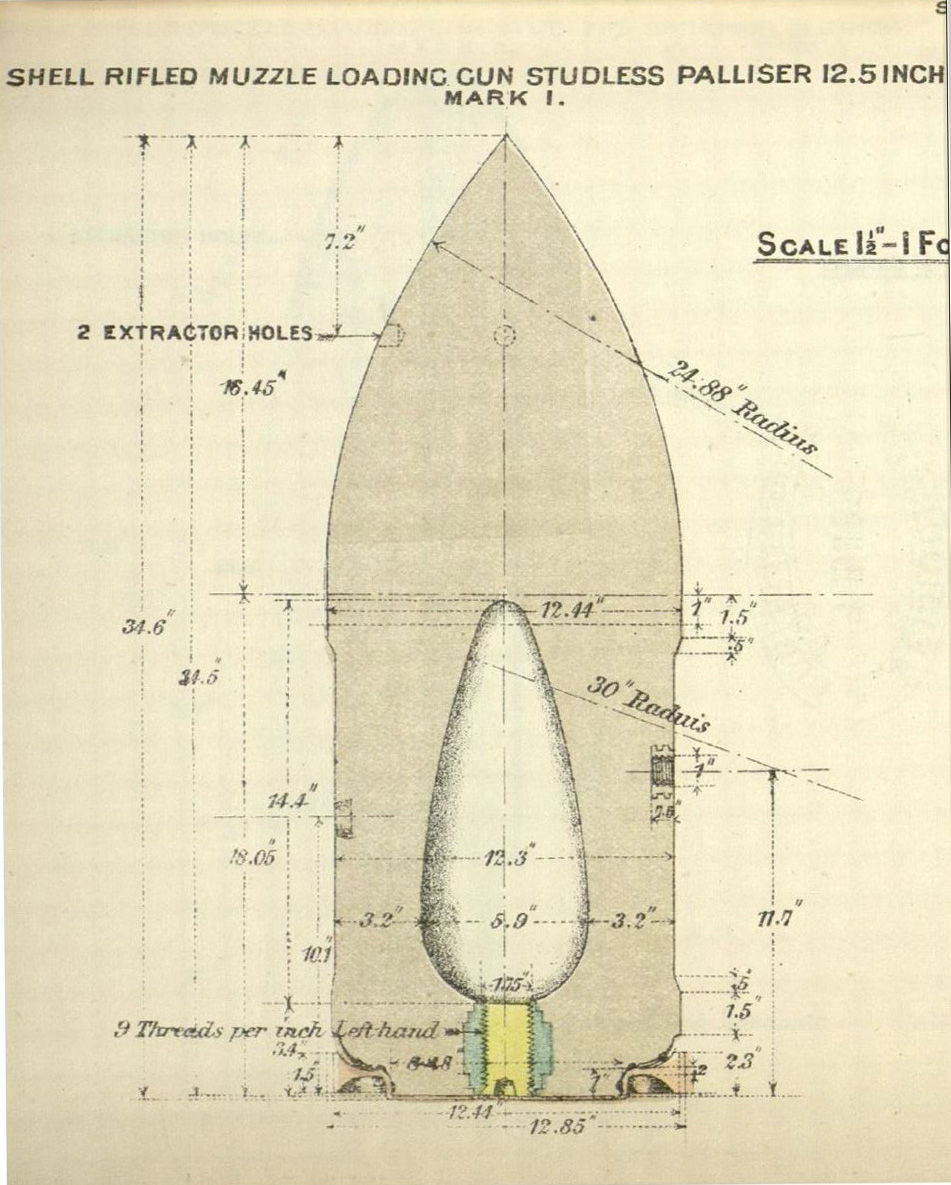
1

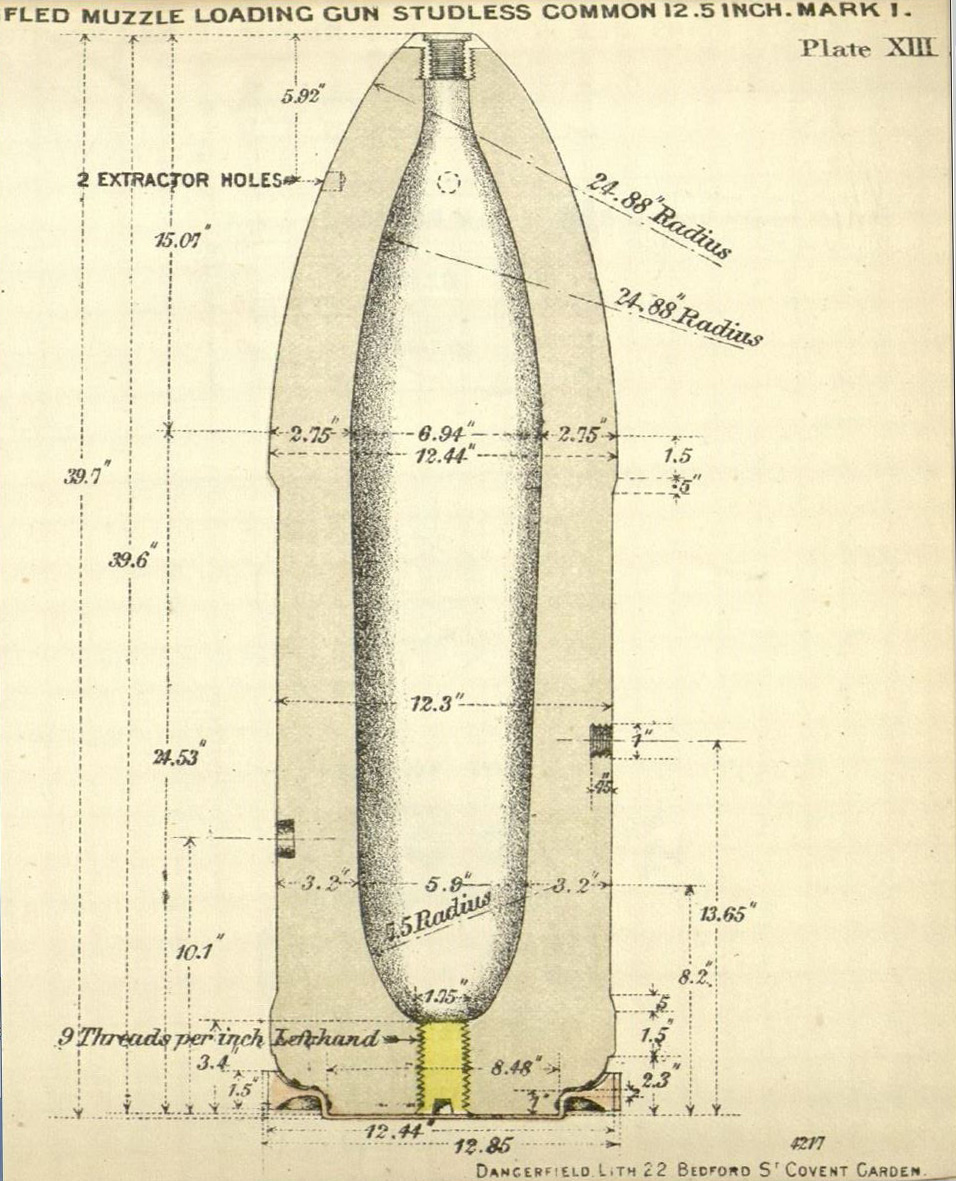
2
1. RML 12.5in Studless Palliser Shell Mk I with Automatic Gas-Check
2. RML 12.5in Studless Common Shell Mk I with Automatic Gas-Check

== See also ==
- Gas-checks in British RML heavy guns
- Attached gas-check
