= Spy Glass Battery =

Artillery battery in Gibraltar

Spyglass Battery
- Part of Fortifications of Gibraltar
- Gibraltar
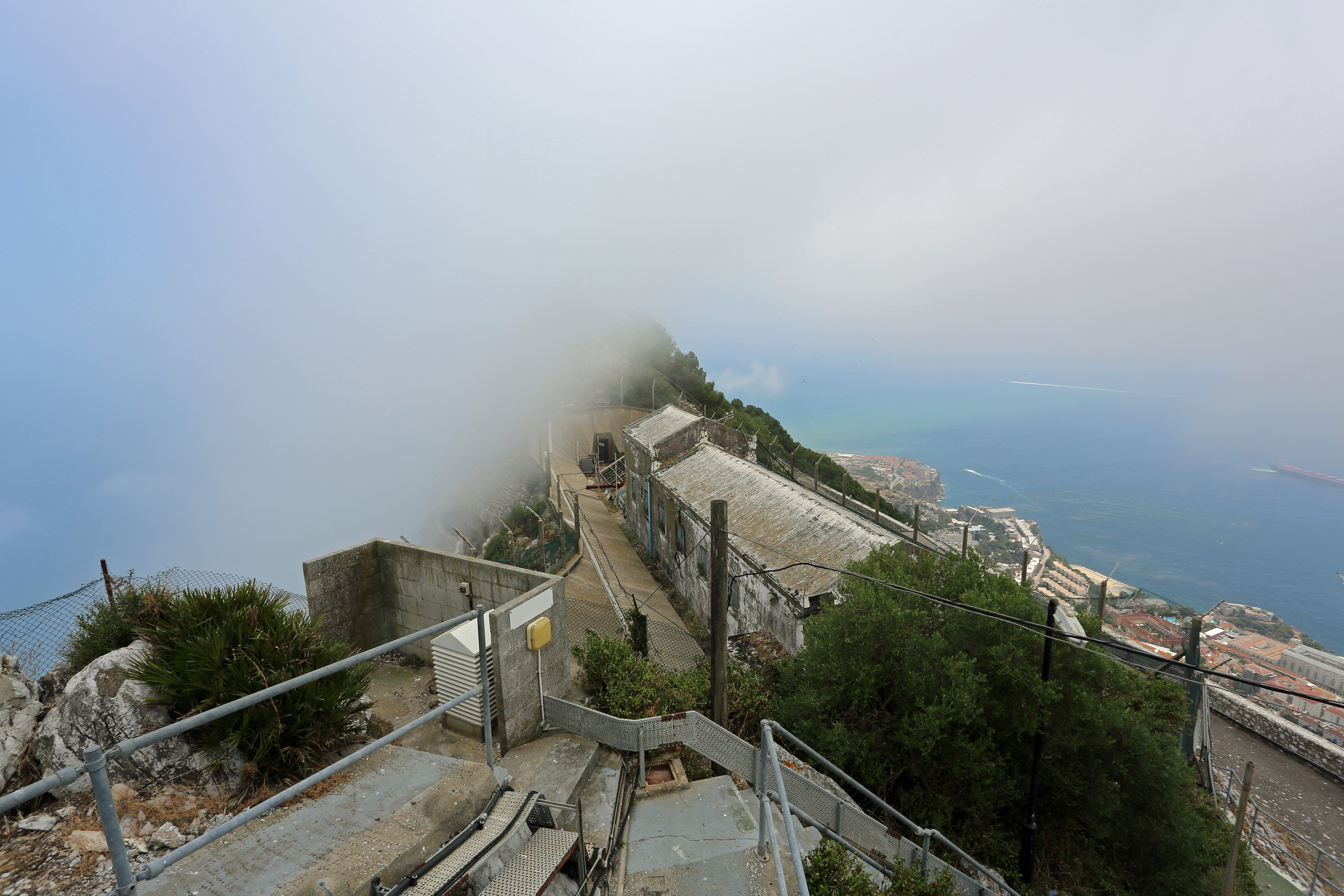
- The Levanter Cloud streaming over Spy Glass Battery

Site information
- Type: Artillery battery
- Owner: Ministry of Defence
- Controlled by: Ministry of Defence

Location
- Coordinates: 36.127318°N 5.344154°W

Spy Glass Battery or Spyglass Battery was originally a high angle artillery battery in the British Overseas Territory of Gibraltar. The battery is mounted high on the rock to give extra range and protection. The battery was still in use during the Second World War as a listening post and site for a Bofors Gun.

== Description ==
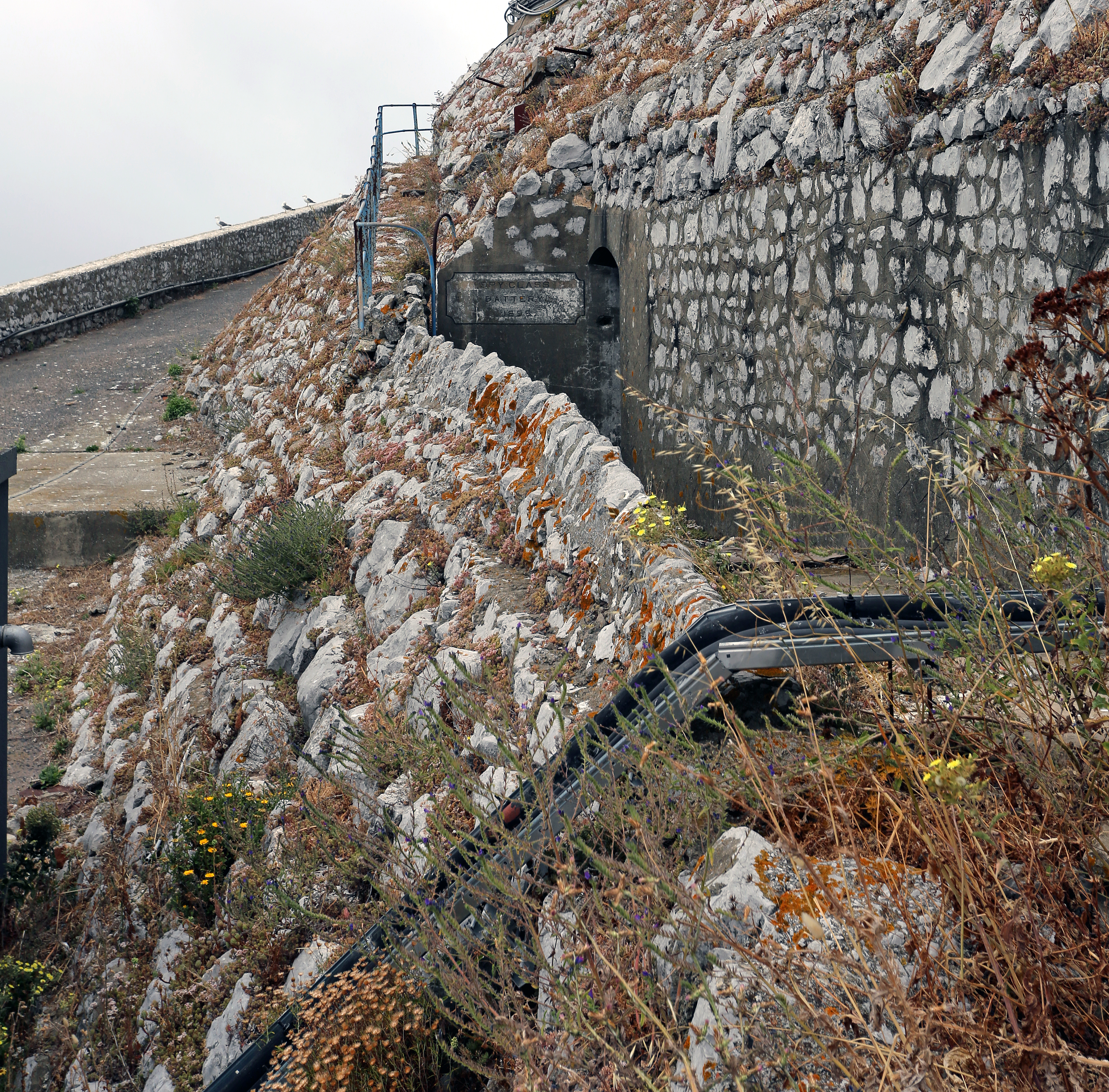
1898 is the date on the entrance

The six RML 10-inch 18-ton guns here were seen as the culmination of the idea of "retired batteries". Originally most of Gibraltar's guns were on the coast but Major General Sir John Jones realised that setting them higher up the Rock gave them more range and made them more difficult to hit. The six guns here and at the other ridge batteries were as high as guns could be placed.

This battery however was different in that this was a high angle battery. There was a growing realisation that the thickness of the armour carried by battleships at the end of the nineteenth century meant that they were almost impossible to penetrate with even the largest gun. A new gun was devised this was the Mark 6 RML gun and it was intended to fire high in the air such that it would hit the decks and not the armoured sides of the battleship. These batteries would have been unusual with the guns and crews hidden from view because they were so far below the surface that only specially placed observers could see the horizon. This meant that the crews were very well protected from incoming fire. These high angle guns were the antithesis of the famous gun carriage created by George Koehler which were designed to fire at a depressed angle down the side of the rock of Gibraltar and made a major contribution to the Great Siege of Gibraltar. Here the guns fired up. The advantage of height that the Spyglass battery enabled the guns here to have increased range. The battery here has the date of 1898 on its signage today. The guns have unusual cloud cover caused by the Levant wind which forms clouds as warm air meets the cool rock of Gibraltar.

== Second World War ==
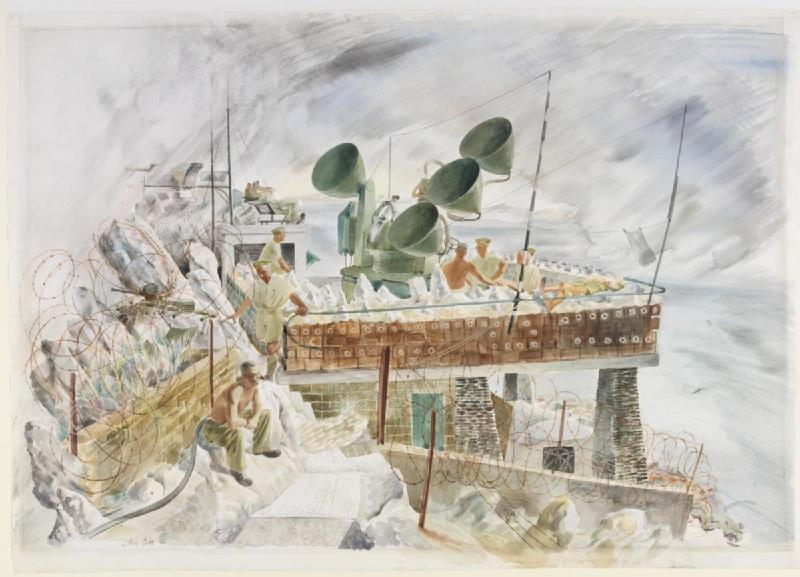
Listening-post at Spyglass

During the Second World War, there was a Bofors anti-aircraft gun here. Leslie Cole who was a War Artist recorded the listening equipment that was being used from this battery. Listening posts were the best early warning of approaching aircraft before the invention of radar. The parabolic shapes directed the smallest of noises to a microphone which would give an early warning. In Britain 30 foot concrete dishes were constructed to carry out the same task.

Today the remains of the battery (like Breakneck Battery) are still under the control of the United Kingdom's Ministry of Defence. The site can be visited only with special permission and there are no routine guided tours.

== Gallery ==
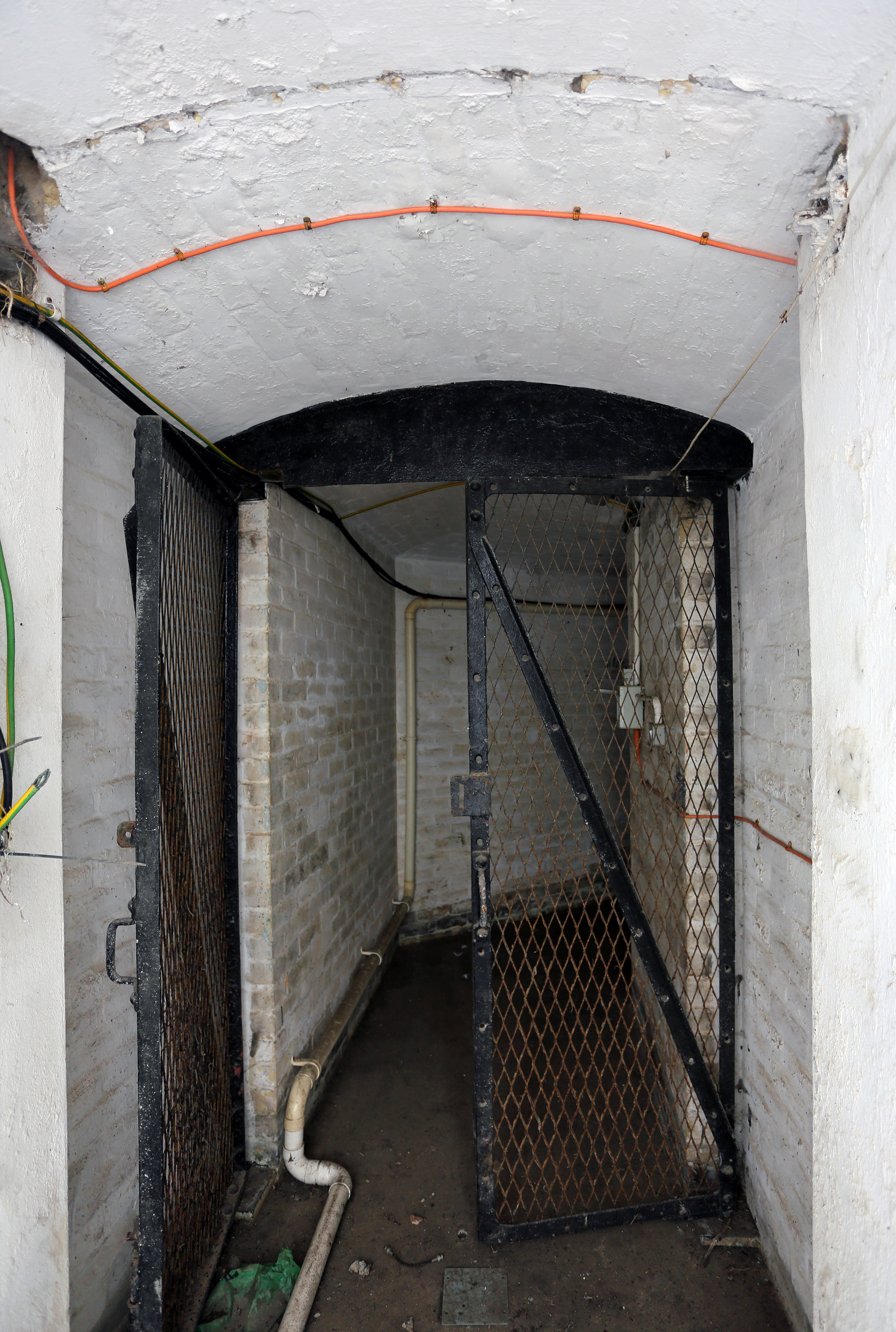
Magazine Entrance

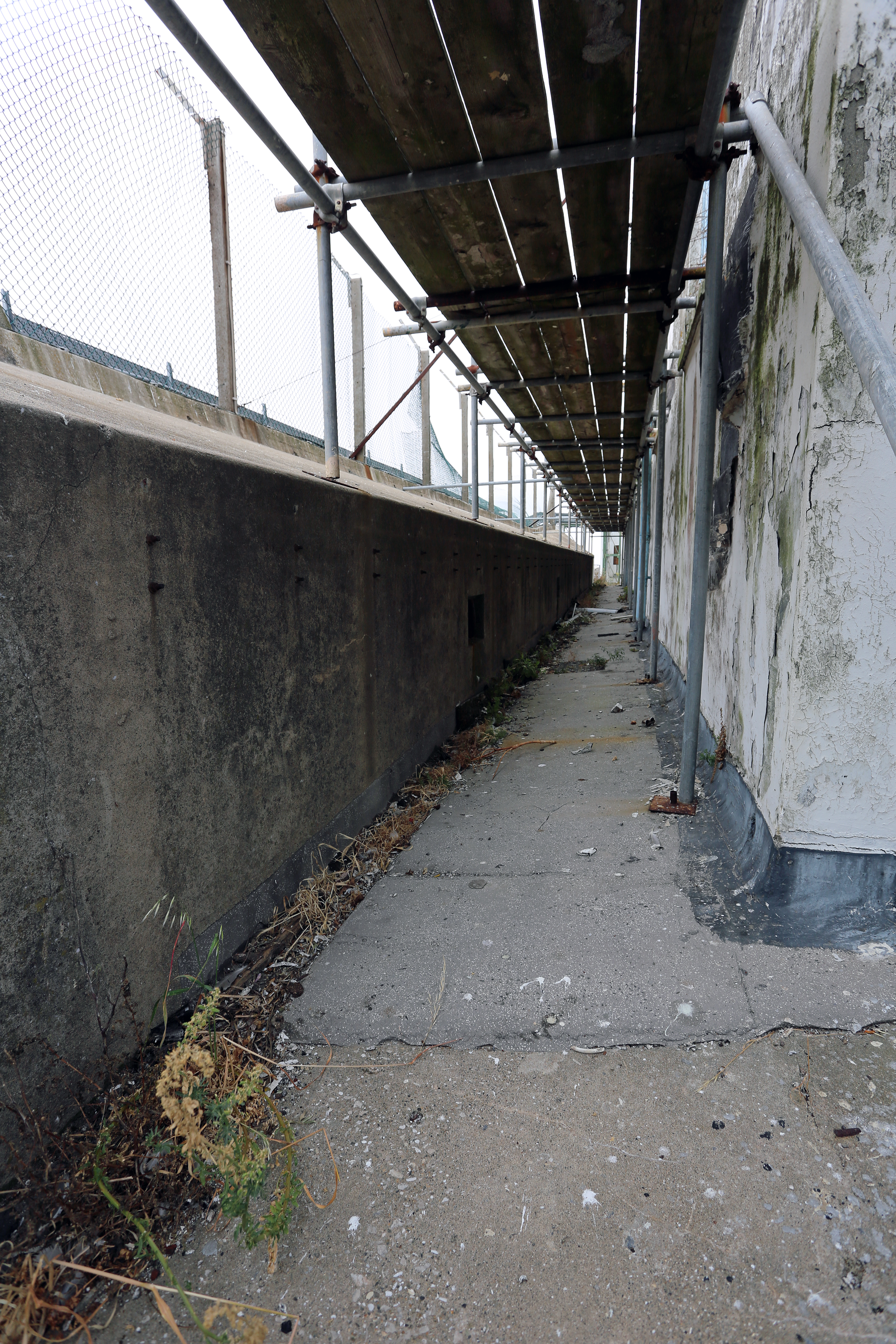
The battery in 2013

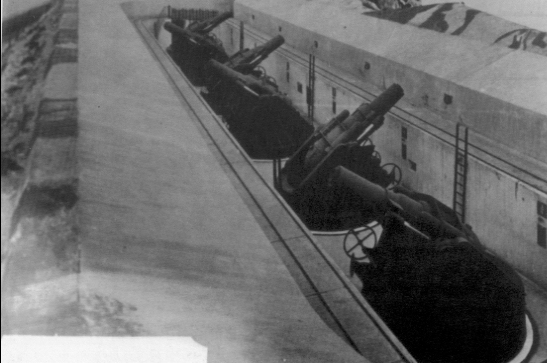
Spyglass high-angle battery

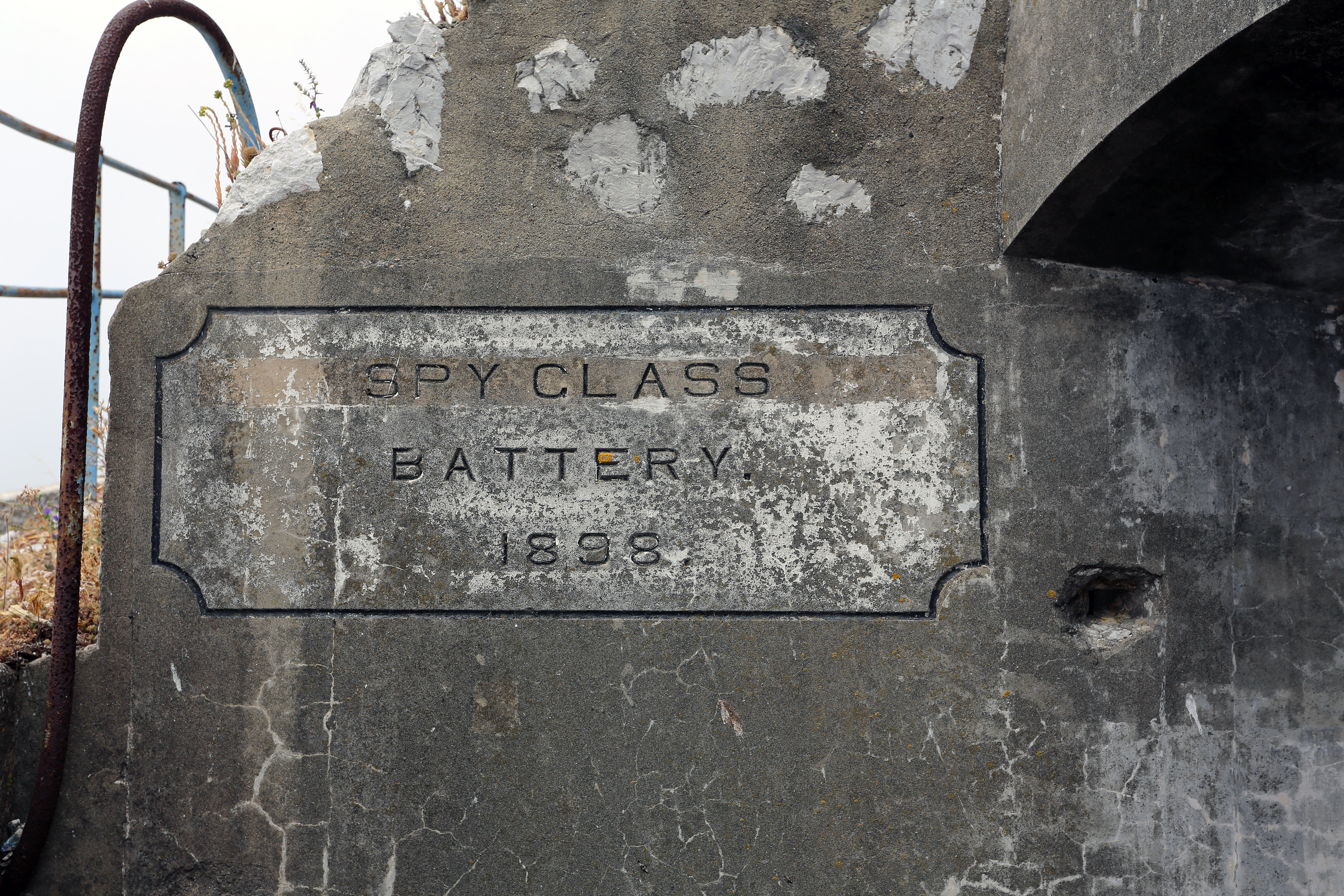
Plaque at entrance
