= 76th Siege Battery, Royal Garrison Artillery =

76th Siege Battery, RGA
- Cap Badge of the Royal Regiment of Artillery
- Active: 3 November 1915–1919
- Country: United Kingdom
- Branch: British Army
- Role: Siege Artillery
- Part of: Royal Garrison Artillery
- Garrison/HQ: Harwich
- Engagements: Battle of the Somme; Battle of Vimy Ridge; Battle of Passchendaele; German Spring Offensive; Hundred Days Offensive

76th Siege Battery was a heavy howitzer unit of Britain's Royal Garrison Artillery (RGA) raised in Essex and Suffolk during World War I. It saw active service on the Western Front at the Somme, Vimy Ridge and Passchendaele, against the German Spring Offensive, and in the final Allied Hundred Days Offensive.

== Mobilisation ==
On the outbreak of war in August 1914, units of the part-time Territorial Force (TF) were invited to volunteer for Overseas Service and the majority of the Essex and Suffolk Royal Garrison Artillery did so. This unit had mobilised as part of No 14 (Essex & Suffolk) Coastal Fire Command at Landguard Fort, charged with defending the Haven ports of Harwich, Felixstowe and Ipswich and the associated naval base. By October 1914, the campaign on the Western Front was bogging down into Trench warfare and there was an urgent need for batteries of siege artillery to be sent to France. The WO decided that the TF coastal gunners were well enough trained to take over many of the duties in the coastal defences, releasing Regular RGA gunners for service in the field. Soon the TF RGA companies that had volunteered for overseas service were also supplying trained gunners to RGA units serving overseas and providing cadres to form complete new units.

In August 1915 Harwich was chosen as one of the depots for forming these units, under the command of Major G.W. Horsfield of the Essex & Suffolk RGA. The selected Territorials were sent to Beacon Hill Battery under Capt F.A.W. Cobbold (a member of Ipswich's Cobbold brewing family) to begin their training. The first battery to be formed at Harwich, 76th Siege Battery, consisted of a half battery of men drawn from all four companies of the Essex & Suffolk RGA, the remainder being returning wounded Regulars, men of the Special Reserve, and 'Kitchener's Army' volunteers.

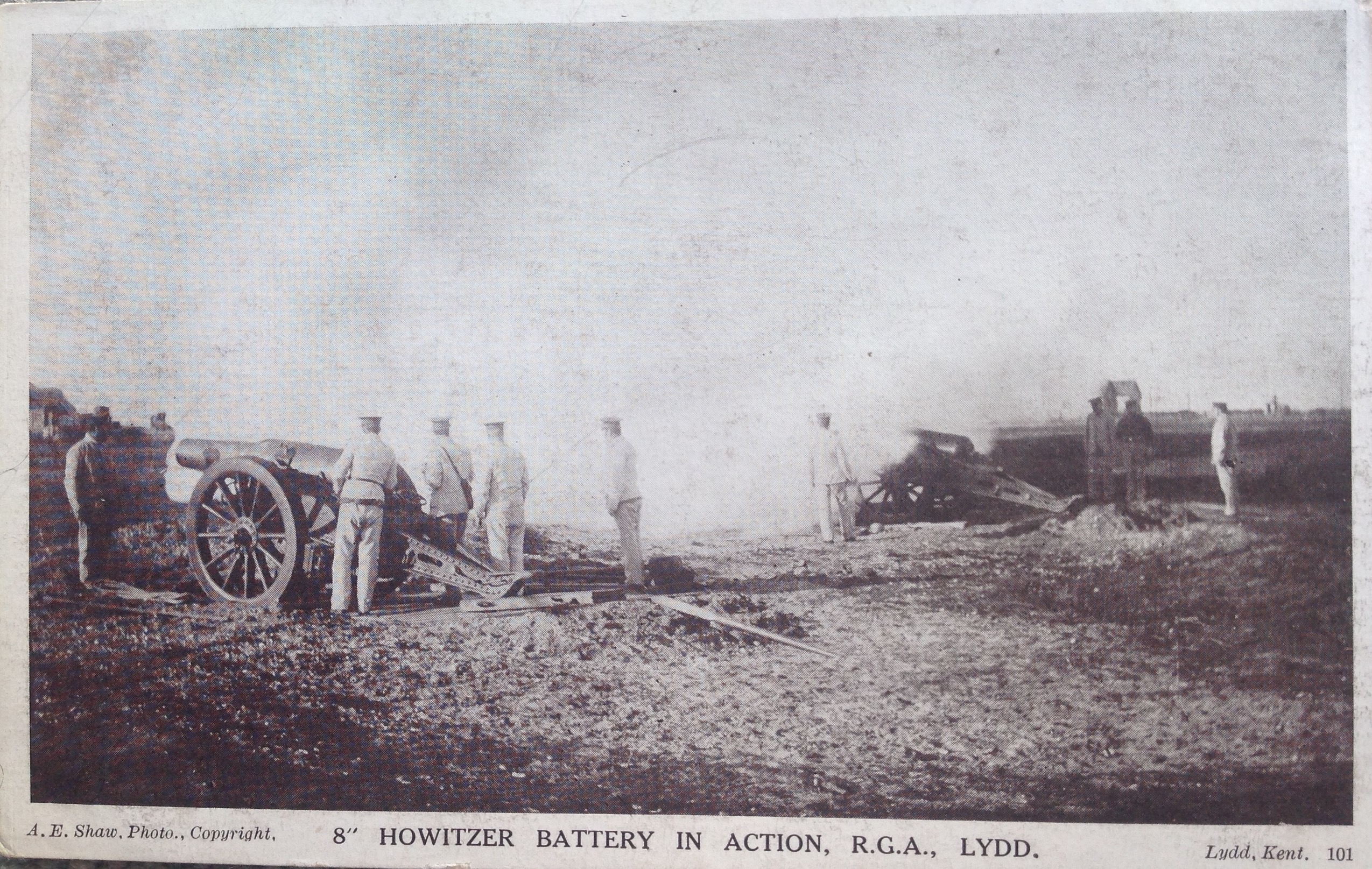
RML 8-inch howitzers being fired at Lydd, ca, 1903.

On 3 November 1915 the half battery from Harwich travelled to Roffey Camp, Horsham, to join the other personnel from Clarence Barracks, Portsmouth, under the command of Maj W.H. Brent Clark. Clark had been the Regular Army adjutant of the Essex & Suffolk before the war and had applied to transfer to the battery from command of 67th Siege Bty. In December the battery moved to Lydd Camp where the men were introduced to modern heavy guns, but did gun drill on 9.45-inch Skoda howitzers from the Second Boer War and their actual field firing with 8-inch rifled muzzle-loading howitzers dating from 1879. The other units under training at Lydd at this time included 67th and 69th Siege Btys and five South African Heavy Artillery batteries (71st, 72nd, 73rd, 74th, 75th). On 15 March 1916 the battery left Lydd for Bristol, where it mobilised with its equipment (four 9.2-inch howitzers towed by Holt 75 caterpillar tractors) and was joined by its Ammunition Column, Motor Transport (MT), 653 Company, Army Service Corps, which had formed on 3 March 1916.

== Western Front ==
On 24 March the main body of the battery went to Avonmouth Docks to load the equipment on HM Transport Aragon while an advance party went to Southampton where they boarded SS Hantonia. The advance party landed at Le Havre on 28 March and reached Albert, Somme, on 2 April, where they began preparing gun positions. The main body from Bristol embarked at Southampton on SS Lydia together with 69th Siege Bty with whom they had trained at Lydd, arriving at Boulogne on 1 April. The delayed Aragon with the guns and equipment arrived on 14 April and these were entrained for Talmas. The battery spent the next two weeks learning how to lay the firing beams and to mount and dismount their new howitzers. The few Regulars who had already seen service with 10th, 12th and 13th Siege Batteries were able to pass on their experience. By 11 May the whole battery was in position alongside the Albert–Amiens road, the guns camouflaged as haystacks, ready to open fire.

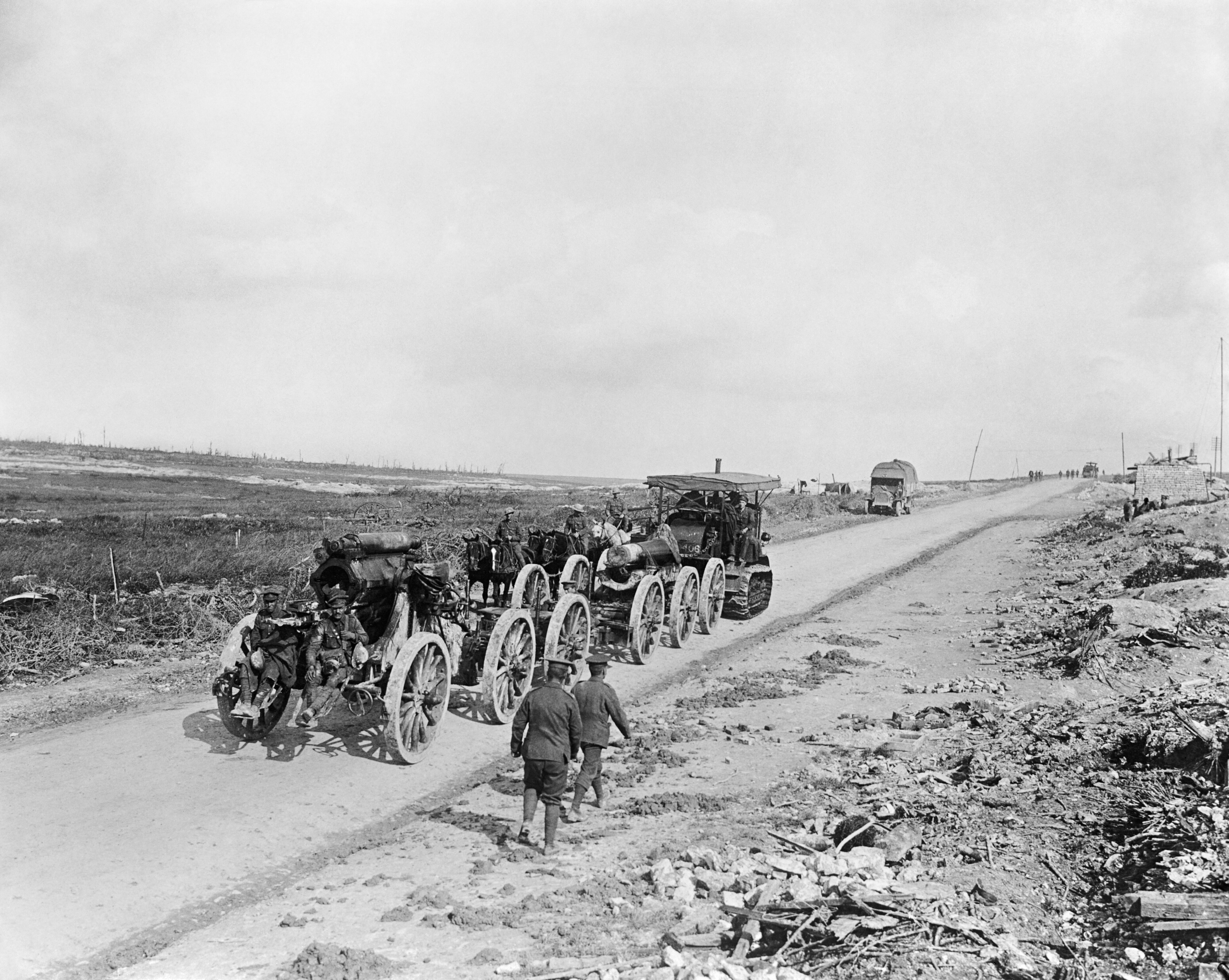
A Holt 75 caterpillar tractor hauling a 9.2-inch howitzer on the Somme, summer 1916.

=== Somme ===
The battery had joined X Corps' Southern Heavy Group on 19 April, being assigned to 25th Heavy Artillery Group (HAG) when that HQ arrived at Bouzincourt on 24 April. 653 Company, ASC, was absorbed into 25th HAG's ammunition column next day. X Corps was part of Fourth Army, which was preparing for that year's 'Big Push' (the Battle of the Somme). 76th Siege Battery was actually positioned among guns belonging to the neighbouring III Corps, including 69th Siege Bty alongside. The III Corps batteries had already requisitioned all the best sites for observation posts (OPs), but the 76th was able to obtain essential stores from III Corps. Eventually four OPs were established facing the village of Thiepval. 76th Siege Bty fired 100 rounds in support of a trench raid at Thiepval on 5 June. The batteries of 25th HAG then began registering their guns on their targets in support of 32nd and 36th (Ulster) Divisions who would launch the main attack.

The German positions facing X Corps were of great strength: Thiepval itself formed a strongpoint on the crest of a ridge overlooking the British lines, while other strongpoints protected the German line with crossfire. The main bombardment was to extend over five days, U, V, W, X and Y, before the assault was launched on Z Day. The strenuous work of firing the heavy guns and howitzers was divided into 2-hour periods to allow the gunners to rest, Forward Observation Officers (FOOs) to be relieved, and the guns to cool. U Day was 24 June, but on several days the weather was too bad for good air or ground observation and the programme was extended by two days (Y1 and Y2). During the bombardment 76th Siege Bty concentrated on strongpoints and machine gun posts in and around Thiepval, including the chateau and Mouquet Farm ('Mucky Farm'). From X Day the intensity of the bombardment increased, with A and B guns firing 130 rounds each in 12 hours, and C and D 125 rounds each in 6 hours (the 9.2-inch howitzer was only designed to fire 6 rounds per hour). On Z Day (1 July, the First day on the Somme) the artillery programme began at 06.35. The infantry went 'over the top' at 07.30 and the heavy artillery bombardment proceeded through its planned phases, lifting from one objective to the next. However, in the words of 25th HAG's war diary, the attack was 'not very successful: Left Division (36th) gained objective, 32nd Division held up'. One brigade of 36th (Ulster) Division had swept through the German positions opposite, but the other was shot down in No man's land. 32nd Division had crept into No man's land under cover of the barrage and the men rushed the German front trenches, but were then cut down crossing the open ground. At 08.30 the 4th Phase bombardment was ordered to be repeated because the infantry were held up in front of Thiepval and could not reach their objective. The batteries continued firing on this line until 10.55 (incidentally blocking the planned advance of 36th (Ulster) Division's reserve brigade), when 76th Siege Bty was ordered to cease fire and the other batteries switched to shelling German strongpoints. 76th Siege Bty joined in a re-bombardment of the trenches at 12.15 and then a bombardment of Thiepval from 15.00, but it was too scattered to be effective and the advance could not be restarted, while counter-attacks drove the Ulstermen out of most of their gains.

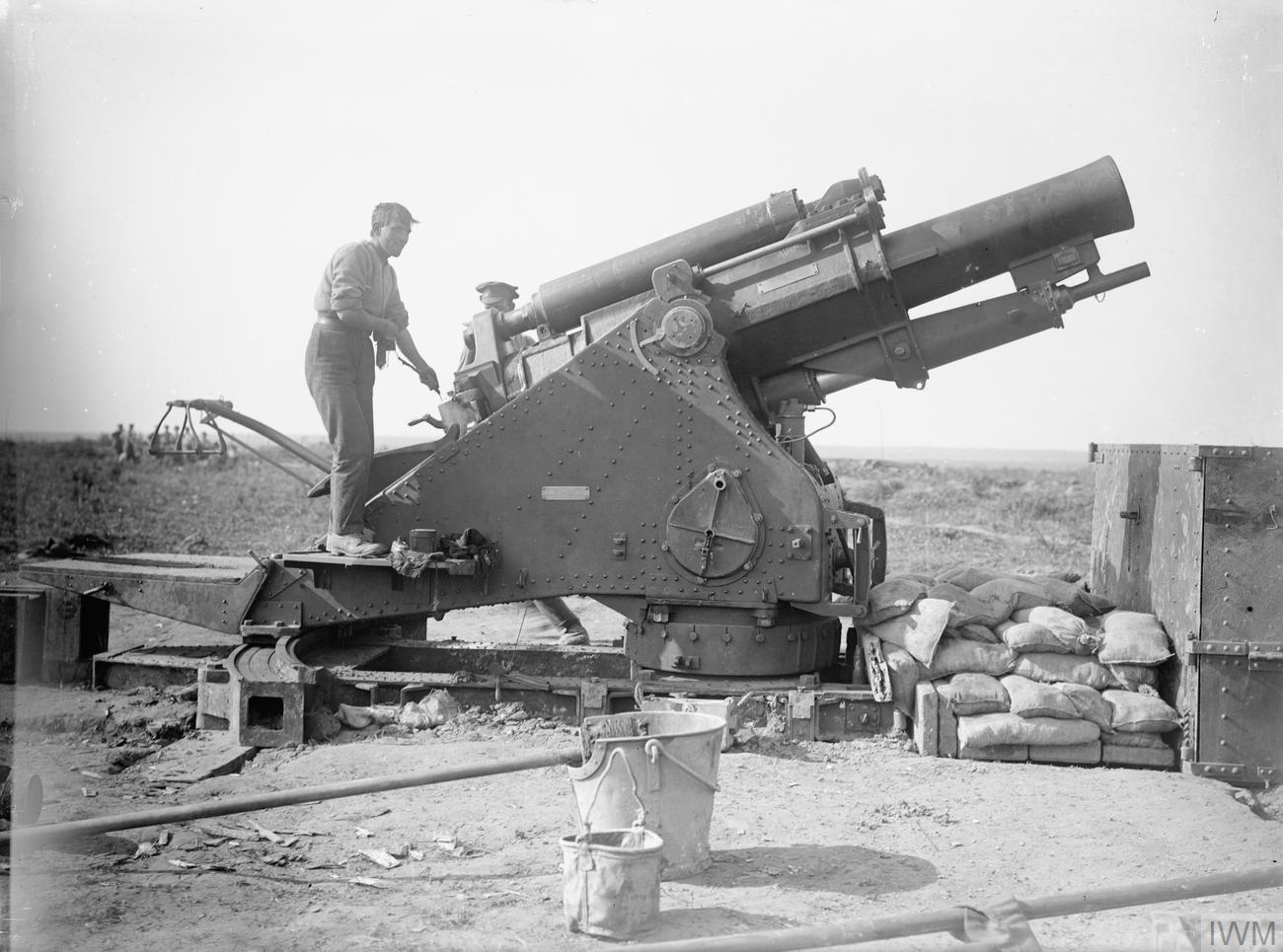
9.2-inch howitzer in action on the Somme, 1916.

The offensive continued over subsequent days, 76th Siege Bty firing at targets in Thiepval and the Ovillers-la-Boisselle area. On 7 July one of the battery's howitzers (C gun) was damaged by the premature explosion of a shell and was replaced a few days later. The battery supported the attacks on Pozières and Contalmaison, to the right of Thiepval, which meant that new OPs had to be established in the old German front line. II Corps of Reserve Army now took over this part of the line, including 25th HAG, whose batteries continued to fire on Pozières, which was finally captured on 25 July. 76th Siege Bty supported the capture of Ration Trench in early August then during the fighting for Mucky Farm on 11–12 August, the battery's ammunition expenditure was unusually heavy, D gun firing 85 rounds in 52 minutes, the barrel having to be cooled with wet sandbags. 18 August saw another day of heavy firing, the heavy artillery's barrage isolating the objective for 145th (South Midland) Brigade's successful attack. Firing continued daily until the end of the month, when there was a special bombardment of the Thiepval and Ration Trench area: 76th Siege Bty fired 400 rounds and broke the timber baulks beneath both C and D guns, which had to be dismounted and re-positioned. Major Clark was evacuated to hospital on 8 September and Capt Cobbold took command.

On 10 September the battery's Left Section (LX) was ordered to dismount its guns and move forward to a new position near Usna Hill, close to the British font line of 1 July in front of La Boisselle. The two sections were now directed at different targets: while Right Section (RX) continued to pound Thiepval, LX attacked Mucky Farm and the Schwaben Redoubt, and contributed to the successes of the Battle of Flers–Courcelette on 15 September. Once II Corps finally captured Thiepval Ridge on 26–28 September after a heavy bombardment, RX could be brought forward. On 1 October the battery's personnel took over three guns from 13th Siege Bty at Ovillers-La Boisselle and brought up D Section's original gun. The gunners occupied captured German dugouts and the OPs were in disused trenches or in Mesnil Chateau. At this period the heavies were engaged in firing concentrations at enemy-occupied villages, with 76th Siege Bty targeting Grandcourt, Pys, Miraumont and Irles. It also participated in counter-battery (CB) shoots in combination with observation aircraft: on 25 October it fired at four separate hostile batteries. Ammunition was brought up to the guns over the cratered ground by means of a Decauville Railway. II Corps gradually captured the Schwaben Redoubt and other German strongpoints in their front. For 63rd (Royal Naval) Division's attack on Beaumont-Hamel on 13 November (the Battle of the Ancre), 76th Siege Bty was required to swing its howitzers to their extreme left so that they could enfilade two enemy support trenches: these trenches were reported to be completely destroyed by this bombardment.

The Somme offensive died down after 15 November. There were minor operations on the Ancre Heights during January 1917, with 76th Siege Bty engaging newly dug German trenches in front of its OP in the Schwaben Redoubt. The battery suffered casualties when this OP was hit by an enemy shell. In early February the battery was moved to a position near Pozières, a difficult move because the earth in the boxes that counterweighted the guns was completely frozen and could not be dug out until thawed, while the lorries had to be kept running continuously to avoid freezing. By now D Section's old gun was so worn that it was firing inaccurately and the OC refused to use it until it was condemned and replaced. In March the Germans began their withdrawal to the Hindenburg Line (Operation Alberich), and the battery moved up to Martinpuich with two serviceable guns, but the enemy had retired out of range.

=== Vimy ===
Batteries were regularly moved from one HAG to another, so 76th Siege Bty was unusual in having remained with 25th HAG for almost a year. However, on 18 March it was ordered to the Arras sector where it joined 13th HAG with First Army, arriving on 26 March. First Army was preparing for the Arras Offensive, with 13th HAG deployed at Marœuil supporting Canadian Corps. 76th Siege Bty moved into four previously prepared concrete emplacements in a small wood. Some concrete had to be chipped away to make space for the large firing beams of the 9.2-inch howitzers, then the concrete broke up under the concussion of firing, and new emplacements had to be dug. The wood was in full view of German OPs on Vimy Ridge, so all movement and ammunition supply had to be carried out after dark. To avoid being spotted, the battery only fired registration shots until the day before the assault. The targets, registered from an OP near Neuville-Saint-Vaast, were Thélus, La Chaudière, Vimy, Farbus, enemy trenches and machine gun positions on the ridge, and enemy batteries. On the afternoon of 8 April the battery was ordered to fire 100 rounds into Thélus and do as much damage as possible. The attack went in at 05.30 next morning with a heavy barrage and bombardment; the Canadians overran three lines of German trenches and seized the crest of the ridge, where the battery established an OP for the following morning's shoot. The FOOs found that original target for 10 April was already in Canadian hands. Petit Vimy was chosen as an alternative target: the battery hit it accurately with its new 9.2s, and it was soon evacuated.

Firing continued over subsequent days as the Canadians consolidated the captured ground and carried out a limited exploitation. 76th Siege Bty moved Nos 2 and 4 guns up to La Targette and a few days later moved 1 and 3 to Neuville-Saint-Vaast. At the end of April the whole battery moved forward to Thélus, where on 30 April it came under the command of 76th HAG, a specialist CB group. The battery carried out shoots with the aid of observation aircraft and OPs on the ridge looking into the German rear areas; one of these shoots involved a duel with the target battery, which returned fire on 76th. On 17 May the battery came under the command of 50th (South African) HAG under Third Army, which was continuing the Arras offensive. CB shoots were carried out with air observation, the battery working closely with No 57 Squadron, Royal Flying Corps

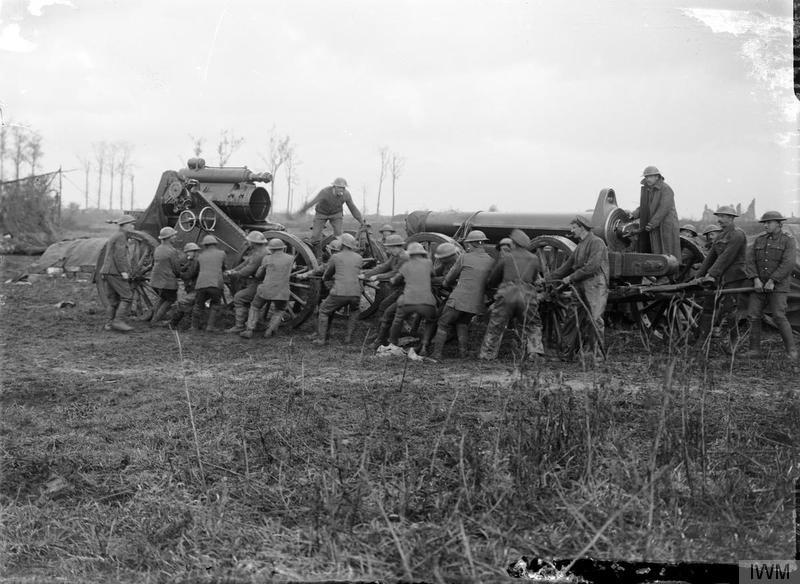
Moving a 9.2-inch howitzer on its travelling carriage at Ypres, 1917.

=== Ypres ===
On 29 May the battery was ordered to dismount its guns and move north. It took up position at Potton Farm near Poperinghe, behind the Ypres Salient. It now came under 70th HAG in VIII Corps. This was part of Second Army, which was preparing for the Battle of Messines, and although the corps was not scheduled to attack its artillery assisted the preparations. 76th Siege Bty was engaged in CB work against batteries in the St Julien area, north of the sector to be attacked. It had problems with US-manufactured shells that included a large number of 'duds', and it came under hostile shrapnel fire, suffering a number of casualties. Once the attack had been delivered on 7 June, VIII Corps was withdrawn and on 11 June the battery transferred to 90th HAG under the command of XVIII Corps in Fifth Army but the new position at Ypres Cavalry Barracks was actually in XIX Corps' area.

At the end of June the battery was brought up to a strength of six howitzers when it was joined by a section (2 officers and 32 other ranks (ORs)) from 356th Siege Bty, which had also been formed with a cadre from the Essex & Suffolk RGA. Although the battery continued its CB shoots, the working parties preparing the new positions in the open at the cavalry barracks were hindered by enemy shelling and suffered a number of casualties. When the first four guns were moved up they came under fire from German guns directed by aircraft, over 3000 rounds of ammunition being destroyed in a fire on 4 July when two men were killed and over 30 wounded, including Maj Cobbold; all four guns were put out of action, two being 'practically uprooted'. A new battery position had to be selected behind a row of ruined houses on the Brielen road north-west of Ypres.

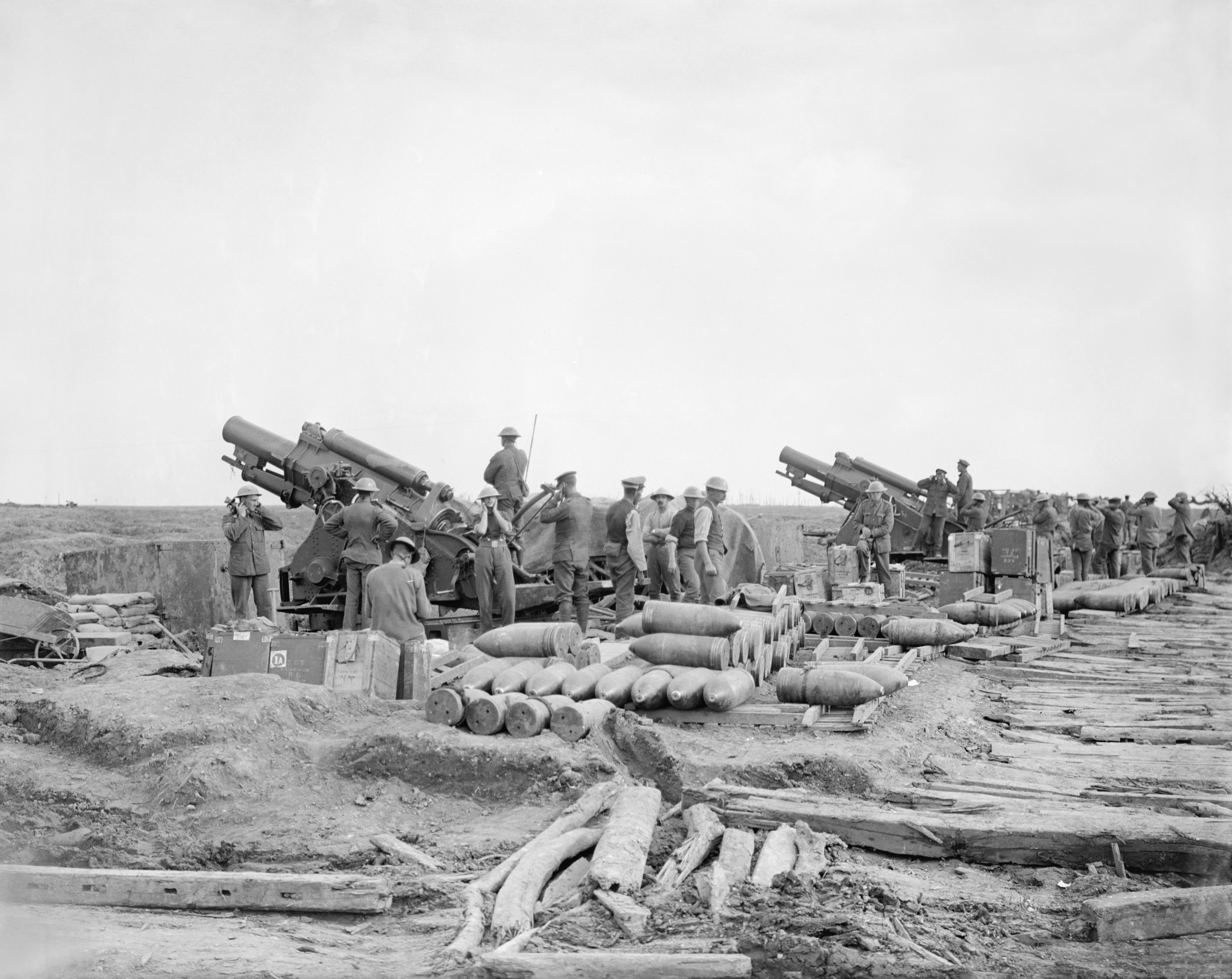
Section of 9.2-inch howitzers in action at Ypres, October 1917.

Fifth Army HQ had been brought to Ypres to carry out the planned Flanders offensive (the Third Battle of Ypres). Although the preliminary bombardment had begun on 12 June, the Germans had air superiority and better OPs, and the recent experience of 76th Siege Bty was not untypical for the British artillery in the Salient. However, the British build-up continued and as time went by the guns began to get the upper hand, with the full artillery preparation beginning on 16 July. On 21 July Maj Owen Wakeford arrived to take command of 76th Siege Bty, which moved forward to Gibraltar Farm near Potijze after the Germans withdrew a little on 24 July. The delayed attack (the Battle of Pilckem Ridge) was launched on 31 July. Although XVIII Corps initially made a good start and reached the Steenbeke stream, counter-attacks in the afternoon took back some of the ground, and heavy rain in the evening halted any further moves.

The massed guns prepared the way for the next assault (the Battle of Langemarck) on 16 August. The result was failure: the guns failed to suppress German strongpoints. 76th Siege Bty's FOO party at their OP in a captured pillbox looking down upon Zonnebeke watched as a battalion of the Royal Irish Rifles was effectively wiped out in 2–3 minutes. The pillbox became a shelter for the wounded, and the FOO gathered a group of about 20 German prisoners to carry them to the rear. With telephone wires cut by the counter-barrage, the OP could only keep in touch by using carrier pigeons. Early next morning the FOO party was driven out by German gas shells, which also caused casualties at the battery position during the coming days.

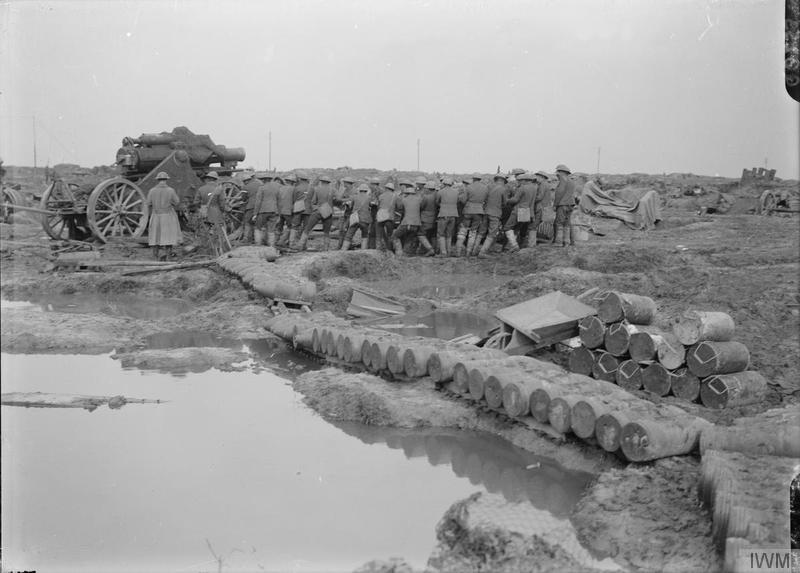
Positioning a 9.2-inch howitzer and its ammunition in the mud of the Ypres Salient, 1917.

As the Ypres offensive bogged down Second Army took over its direction in September. The battery was rested from 9 to 17 September 1917, then joined 2nd HAG, which had exchanged with 90th HAG and became the southern CB group supporting V Corps of Second Army. The Battles of the Menin Road (20 September) and Polygon Wood (26 September) were highly successful because of the weight of artillery brought to bear on German positions. But as the offensive continued the tables were turned: British batteries were clearly observable from the Passchendaele Ridge and were subjected to CB fire, while their own guns sank into the mud and became difficult to aim and fire. On 26 September 76th Siege Bty moved its guns up to Cambridge Road and White Chateau, where it suffered a steady trickle of casualties, with a particularly bad day on 6 October during the Battle of Broodseinde. At the end of the month it moved up onto Frezenburg Ridge to support the Canadian attacks on Passchendaele, where the task of bringing up ammunition under fire, and keeping track of it in the mud and destruction, became almost impossible. The exhausted battery was finally taken out of action on 15 December 1917.

76th Siege Bty joined 62nd HAG on 22 December but continued resting until 15 January 1918. By now HAG allocations were becoming more fixed and converted into permanent RGA brigades. 62nd Brigade changed its designation on 22 December and was defined as a Mixed Brigade, with guns and howitzers of several sizes. Apart from short periods on detachment, 76th Siege Bty remained with this brigade until the Armistice.

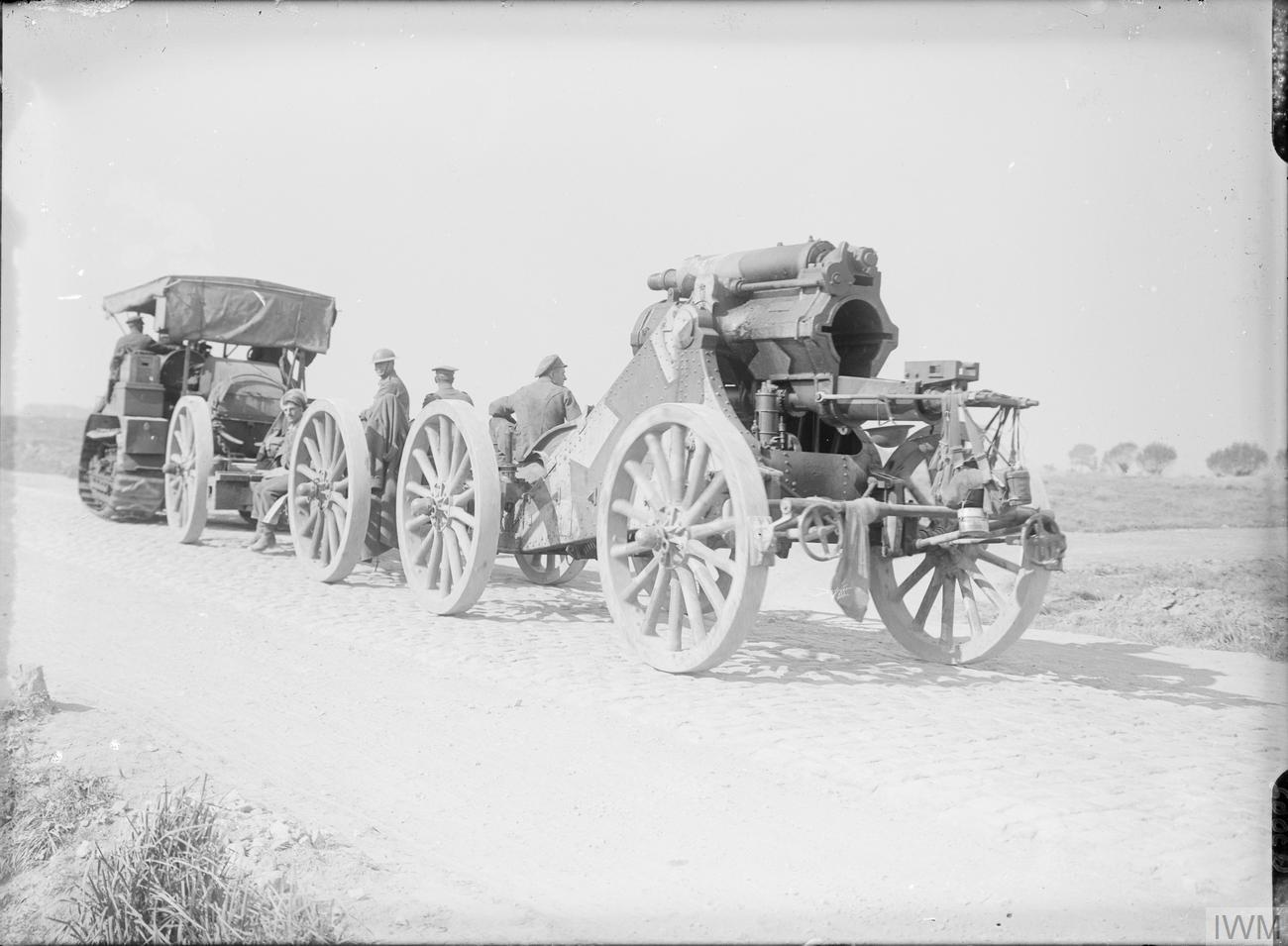
9.2-inch howitzer broken down into three loads for road movement.

=== Spring Offensive ===
In February 76th Siege Bty was ordered south, and began the move on 3 March to Hermies, where 62nd Bde RGA had transferred to V Corps under Third Army. The battery was dug into a disused quarry alongside the Ruyaulcourt road. After registering its guns, the battery remained silent. The anticipated German Spring Offensive was launched at 04.00 on 21 March. 76th Siege Bty immediately went into action, firing pre-arranged SOS barrages to support the infantry in the Flesquières Salient. German retaliation was heavy: the gun positions came under heavy fire of gas, shrapnel and High explosive shells and for a while the guns were forced to cease fire. However, when the German fire moved on the battery resumed its SOS fire, although one gun was out of action. That afternoon Maj Wakeford was hit by a gas shell and fatally wounded. (Note: Major Wakeford's body was never recovered and he is commemorated on the Arras Memorial.) When the second-in-command, Capt E.D.R. Ramsdale, arrived from HQ, he brought orders to pull out, and the ASC brought up the caterpillar tractors and lorries, allowing the battery to get clear with the guns and some stores during the night. The field artillery and many of the retreating infantry had already passed through the position before the column pulled out, and Hermies was reached by German troops who had outflanked the Flesquières Salient. The battery struggled back to its reserve position at Ruyaulcourt, where it had emplaced three guns by the evening of 22 March. Shortly afterwards it was ordered to move on. At dawn next day the battery began digging in at Le Mesnil, but it was realised that '9.2 howitzers, being only semi-mobile, were of no use in a running battle' and the battery was ordered to pull out entirely, going back through Bapaume to Albert. The journey along roads crowded with retreating troops and civilians was slow, while Bapaume was under shellfire and a number of casualties were suffered. The battery became split into subunits spread over 20 miles (32 km) of road. Albert was under air attack, so the heavy batteries were moved on, Lewis guns mounted on the lorries in case German cavalry broke through, and passing through Doullens reached Hem-Hardinval on the evening of 26 March. Here 76th Siege Bty halted after a retreat of some 40 miles (64 km) and was able to rest.

The battery's return to the front began on 11 April when three guns went up to Hérissart and were dug in, positioned in case of a further German breakthrough. 62nd Brigade was designated a CB brigade covering the northern part of V Corps' front, but the guns at Hérissart were out of range. They had to be moved up to Forceville to join Bde HQ. 76th Siege Bty then prepared forward positions for the other three guns on the Hédauville–Mailly-Maillet road, which was under shellfire, and numerous casualties were suffered during May, including the new second-in-command, Capt George Andrews, who was killed. (Note: Captain Andrews was buried at Varennes Military Cemetery.)

=== Hundred Days Offensive ===
During May–July 1918 62nd Brigade was engaged in CB and harassing fire (HF) tasks on V Corps' front, which was relatively quiet. 76th Siege Bty used aircraft, Kite balloon and visual observation to hit enemy trench mortar and machine gun emplacements. On 17 August 62nd Bde HQ moved to VI Corps to prepare for Third Army's entry into the Allied Hundred Days Offensive (the Battle of Albert), leaving 76th Siege Bty under the temporary command of 58th Bde, RGA. After a number of moves, the battery rejoined 62nd Bde on 29 August, now with XVII Corps with which it stayed for the rest of the war.

XVII Corps' task on 2 September was to capture the southernmost part of the Drocourt-Quéant Switch Line (the Wotan Stellung) where it joined the Hindenburg Line. Zero hour was 05.00, and at 06.00 the heavy guns including 62nd Bde switched from CB work to firing at the ground ahead of the advancing infantry between the D-Q and Hindenburg lines and on Quéant and other localities. The successful advance of 57th (2nd West Lancashire) Division through this ground cracked open the defences and allowed the flanking divisions to force their way through the Hindenburg Support Position and across the roads behind. 76th Siege Bty took up a very exposed position at Pronville-en-Artois, near Quéant, and after being heavily shelled had to move back into the valley behind.

For the Battle of the Canal du Nord on 27 September, 76th Siege Bty was attached to a Super-Heavy Group, and fired in support of the attack until the enemy were out of range. On 6 October the battery moved two guns into Noyelles-sur-Escaut under cover of darkness. However, the detachments came under heavy fire next morning while they were mounting the guns, and suffered 30 casualties out of 40 men. Reinforcements were sent up from Pronville to complete the task before XVII Corps' attack on Cambrai was launched on 8 October. Although the two guns came under CB fire, this rapidly diminished and before the end of the day the guns received the cease fire order as the enemy were out of range.

By now the offensive had turned into a pursuit, and many of the heavy batteries had to be left behind. 76th Siege Bty dismounted its guns and had them ready on the road in case they were called for, but in mid-October the gunners moved into billets on the outskirts of Cambrai. By 1 November they were billeted at Avesnes-les-Aubert and were still there when hostilities were ended on 11 November by the Armistice with Germany.

=== Disbandment ===
On 21 November the battery received new Mark II 9.2-inch howitzers, but never had the chance to use them. On 27 November it moved to the French Cavalry Barracks in Cambrai, then in early December went by train and road to Authieule near Doullens, where 62nd Bde went into winter quarters. Preliminary demobilisation began in the new year, and as 1919 progressed 76th was reduced to a skeleton battery of officers and men who escorted the guns back to England in May, where they were handed over on the Isle of Wight.

76th Siege Bty was designated 104th Bty in 26th Bde RGA in the interim order of battle published on 21 May 1919, but this was scrapped after the signature of the Treaty of Versailles in June and the battery was officially disbanded. During its service the battery had suffered losses of three officers and 52 ORs killed in action or died of wounds.

== See also ==
- Newsreel film of a 9.2-inch howitzer being fired.
