= SS Normannia (1911) =

British passenger vessel (1911-1940)

History
- Name: TSS Normannia
- Operator: 1911–1948: London and South Western Railway; 1923–1940: Southern Railway
- Port of registry: (United Kingdom)
- Builder: Fairfield, Govan
- Yard number: 481
- Launched: 9 November 1911
- Fate: Bombed and sunk 30 May 1940

General characteristics
- Tonnage: 1,567 gross register tons (GRT)
- Length: 290.3 feet (88.5 m)
- Beam: 36.1 feet (11.0 m)
- Draught: 15.3 feet (4.7 m)

TSS Normannia was a passenger vessel built for the London and South Western Railway in 1911.

== History ==
The ship was built by the Fairfield Govan and launched on 9 November 1911. With her sister ship Hantonia they were put on the service between Southampton and Le Havre. They were the first cross-channel steamers to be fitted with single-reduction geared Parsons turbines, which gave the vessels a speed of over 20 knots but also cut down on the vibration experienced by cross-Channel passengers.

She was requisitioned by the Admiralty in 1914 and operated as a troopship during the First World War, she also brought home Elsie Cameron Corbett and others freed from captivity.

She was acquired by the Southern Railway in 1923.

On 30 May 1940 she was bombed and severely damaged during Operation Dynamo in the North Sea 4 nautical miles (7.4 km) off Dunkerque by Heinkel aircraft of the Luftwaffe. She was beached and abandoned.
