= Royal Samaritan Hospital =

- NHS Greater Glasgow
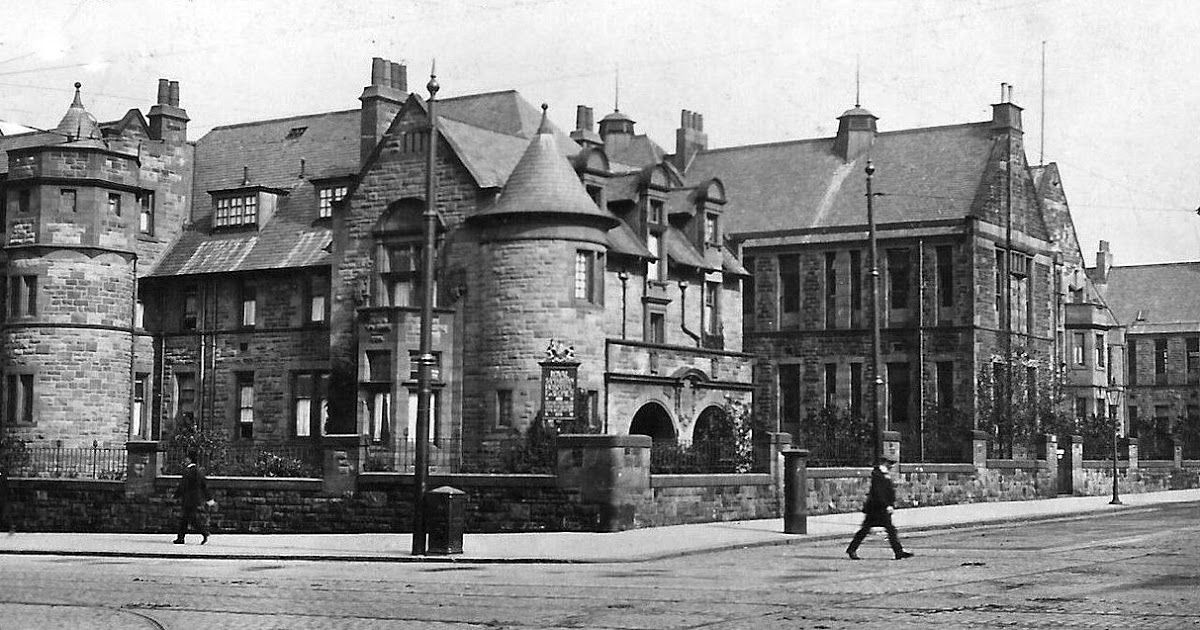
- Royal Samaritan Hospital

- Shown in Glasgow

Geography
- Location: Glasgow, Scotland
- Coordinates: 55.8401°N 4.2626°W

Organisation
- Care system: NHS Scotland
- Type: Specialist

Services
- Emergency department: No
- Speciality: Hospital for Women

History
- Founded: 1886
- Closed: 1991

Links
- Lists: Hospitals in Scotland

The Royal Samaritan Hospital was a hospital for women in Govanhill, Glasgow, Scotland.

== History ==
The hospital had its origins in a converted house in South Cumberland Street which opened in January 1886. It moved to Kingston House in Tradeston in 1890 and to a new purpose‑built hospital, designed by MacWhannel and Rogerson, in Coplaw Street in 1895. The Alice Mary Corbett Memorial Nurses' Home was completed in 1904, funded by the grandmother of Elsie Cameron Corbett. A new wing to the hospital was completed in 1927 and a patients' annex opened in 1936. It joined the National Health Service in 1948 and then closed in 1991.
