= Elsie Cameron Corbett =

Volunteer ambulance driver World War One

The Honourable Elsie Cameron Corbett JP
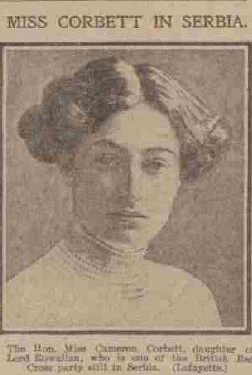
- Born: 4 February 1893; Chelsea, London, England
- Died: 1977 (aged 83–84); Spelsbury, England
- Resting place: All Saint's Churchyard, Spelsbury, Oxfordshire
- Occupations: Volunteer ambulance driver, suffragist, philanthropist
- Father: Archibald Corbett, 1st Baron Rowallan
- Awards: British War Medal and Victory Medal; Serbian Gold Medal for Devoted Service; Scottish Woman's Hospital 1914 medal; Scout Medal

Elsie Cameron Corbett JP (4 February 1893 – 1977) was a volunteer ambulance driver and major donor to the World War One Scottish Women's Hospital for Foreign Service in Serbia. She was a prisoner of war in 1916 and won medals from the Serbian and British governments. She was also a justice of the peace, a leading suffragist, temperance supporter, folklorist and diarist.

== Family and early life ==
The Honourable Elsie Cameron Corbett was born in Chelsea, London on 4 February 1893. She was the only daughter of Archibald Corbett, 1st Baron Rowallan, Scots philanthropist and politician, builder and landowner. Her mother, Alice Polson, who was the daughter of the founder of the Brown and Polson cornflour company, also came from a liberal and philanthropic family. Her parents were married in September 1887 at Skermorlie near Gourock; a year later they moved to Chelsea, where in 1893 their first child Elsie was born.

At eight months old, Elsie Corbett had appeared at a political rally with her parents, which made the news. She was at home in 26 Hans Place, Chelsea for the 1901 census. Her mother died of septicaemia in 1902 when her daughter was nine years old, and she was educated at home by a governess and later went to be educated privately in Brussels. Elsie Corbett was to inherit part of the estate of her maternal grandmother Mary Polson in 1911, after a gift of £10,000 had been made to the Glasgow Samaritan Hospital for building the 'Alice Mary Corbett Nursing Home' in 1902.

She had two younger brothers: Thomas Godfrey Polson Corbett (19 December 1895 – 30 November 1977), who would inherit the Rowallan title, although Elsie was the eldest, and Arthur Cameron Corbett (8 March 1898 – 4 November 1916), who was killed in action at the age of eighteen, in World War I.

She lived with her father, at the estate in Rowallan, Ayrshire, undertaking conventional socialite activities such as attending formal balls, opening local galas, and entering a horse in a country show competition.

Her father's many good works set an example for Corbett, and she became honorary vice-president of the women and girls section of the Scottish Christian Union, which was independent but affiliated to the British Women's Temperance Association. She funded an additional hostel at Glasgow Green for working girls to be able to stay overnight for a low fee.

== Suffragism and war service ==
Enjoying behaving unconventionally, both Corbett and her father publicly supported the National Union of Women's Suffrage Societies (NUWSS). Although she was one of the youngest members of the Scottish Federation of Women's Suffrage Societies Kilmarnock Branch, Corbett became honorary president (1911–1914). At one event, she and her father gave more funds to a Working Girls Club, as they watched a suffragette play, which had already been performed in various settings, written by Henry, husband of suffrage activist Maud Arncliffe Sennett.

The NUWSS were behind the setting up and raising of funds for Dr. Elsie Inglis' Scottish Women's Hospitals for Foreign Service. Corbett became one of their strongest fundraisers and a long term donor to healthcare in Serbia, from 1914–1915 until long after the war in 1935 and beyond.

In 1914, she became honorary vice-president of a group fundraising for the ‘Scottish Lassie’ motorised ambulances for the hospitals nearest the front. She chaired a fundraising concert, with speaker suffragette Teresa Billington-Greig, and a local choir and musicians. Corbett was also a platform guest when over £3,000 was donated (one week later) to the chairman of the British Red Cross, Sir George Beatson, who explained how important these motor vehicles were going to be to move injured troops more rapidly to get urgent treatment.

Corbett then took another unconventional step, and went to train in nursing at Kilmarnock Infirmary and Stobhill Hospital (at that time redesignated 'Scottish Military Hospital No 3') so that she could volunteer to go to the Scottish Women's Hospitals herself, where she worked between 1915 and 1919.

On the sea passage to the war zone, she met Kathleen Nora Dillon (1877–1958) from Aghada, Cork who was put in charge of the transport unit and was to become her lifelong friend, and companion or partner. From Spring 1915, Corbett and Dillon were both with the Red Cross Scottish Ambulance Column.

=== War experiences in the news ===
Corbett's arrival in Serbia was front page "war hero" news in the Christmas Day edition of The Daily Record of 1915, although from 10 November 1915 to 29 February 1916, Corbett was a prisoner of the Austro-Hungarian forces. This was noted by the British press a few days after the earlier item. Herne Bay Press included some of Corbett's letter to her father, reassuring him of her safety and saying "being taken prisoner is not nearly so exciting as it sounds".

After four and a half months, her safe return was also headline news. She sailed via a French port on SS Normannia with other women from the British Red Cross unit. A news image had been taken in Switzerland, when they were ready to return following the 'great retreat' from Serbia, published under the headline "Lord Rowallan's Daughter Home from Serbia" and the Daily Record and Mail commented that the women were "none the worse for their adventure".

In summer 1916, Corbett was back home and working in the Victoria Infirmary, Glasgow as well as chairing meetings at the Kilmarnock branch of NUWSS and fundraising, such as when Mrs Gardner Robertson, of Edinburgh's Morningside spoke of her visit to the Royaumont Scottish Women's Hospital.

=== Serbian ambulance transport service ===
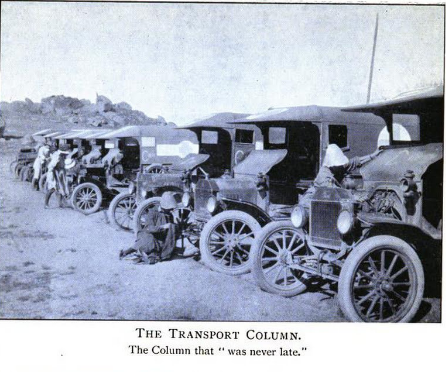
Scottish Women's Hospital, the Transport Column that "was never late", had women motor ambulance drivers

By August 1916 (and up to March 1919), Corbett was again in the war zone, after going to London to learn to drive and repair vehicles. She joined the Voluntary Aid Detachment, driving the ambulances she had been funding. She was placed with the American unit at Ostrovo, to the north of Salonika, retrieving wounded soldiers from the front, occasionally under direct fire, on difficult roads with abandoned vehicles and bodies by the wayside, contending with fuel shortages, to get injured men to urgent treatment. A medical report to the military stated: "The roads are beyond belief and the driving of our girl chauffeurs simply miraculous in its courage and skill".

Elsie Corbett kept notes of her war experience of driving 9,153 miles, transporting 1,122 patients. By August 1917, she was in the Kaimakchalan mountains, Macedonia with ice, snow and damaged roads, again with abandoned vehicles and fatalities to contend with, as the Serbs returned to their homeland. Her role was considered a significant contribution by the Serbian authorities.

Corbett was awarded the Serbian Gold Medal for Devoted Service.

She edited and eventually published her war diary (180pp, re-published in a presentation version in 1964). A copy is now in the National Library of Scotland, after an auction (sold for £120) in 2020. The book includes some of Corbett's personal photography.

==== Ongoing financial support for Serbian healthcare ====
Corbett continued to donate large sums to the work of the Serbian hospitals, for example £188.10s in 1917 for the American unit's motor ambulance and a further £179.0s.6p and £3.16s for a car for Katherine Harley's unit. NUWSS estimated it to cost £350 a year to run an ambulance. Corbett's largest donation of £1,000 was for the Belgrade children's hospital, established by Dr Katherine MacPhail, a sum that was matched by the Peter Coats Trust, initiating an appeal to the West of Scotland to support "a very gallant country woman in a most noble enterprise in a foreign land". Corbett continued to endow a bed at an estimated annual cost of £50, as reported in the local press in 1935.

== Post-war travels and community activity ==
Corbett returned to her previous 'country lady' activities in 1921, being pictured with "Miss Jean Arthur at the meet of Lord Eglinton's foxhounds at Caprington Castle, near Kilmarnock". In 1923, she was invited to a royal reception at Holyrood Palace with her father Lord Rowallan.

In 1922, Corbett was elected to the executive committee of the Women's Institute in Oxfordshire, and convened a new branch in Spelsbury, where she now lived with Kathleen Dillon. In May 1924, she was at the National Federation of Women's Institutes, and reporting back to Mixbury W.I. along with Kathleen Dillon who examined the books of the Mixbury branch and declared it was 'working on the right lines'. She supported Dillon, presenting lantern slides of their experience in Serbia at another new WI branch in Wootton. As Oxfordshire W.I. honorary treasurer in 1926, Corbett was mentioned in the newspaper report of the pageant and displays in Worcester College grounds, which had been modelled on the 'St. Frideswide's Fair of Long Ago'.

She travelled in the summer of 1928 with Dillon (again keeping a diary) across France, Austria and Czechoslovakia. In Spring 1929, at Dillon's home, Spelsbury House, Oxford, she gathered local folk tales and ghost stories for the Women's Institute, which were published in a short article in the journal Folklore. That summer, she and Dillon travelled to Syria and Iraq, as reported in Corbett's diary. She wrote and published a history of the parish of Spelsbury in 1931.

Corbett gave a talk on Albania to the Women's Institute in Turville in April 1939. In 1941, she presented films about 'The Royal Tour of Canada and the USA', 'Poland' and 'Oxford' to the W.I. in Langford, and on the 'charming scenery of The Balkans' in Shenington.

As a teetotaller, Corbett welcomed that her adopted village chose not to have a pub. She set up an animal welfare centre for rescued pit ponies and seaside donkeys. In 1931, Misses Dillon and Corbett's Welsh bull won a prize at the Royal Show in Warwick.

Her father died suddenly in 1933 at age 77 and her brother Thomas inherited the title Lord Rowallan.

She was recruiting a parlourmaid in October 1933 ("2 maids, 2 in family"). The following year she and Dillon travelled across Switzerland, Italy, Croatia, Greece, Hungary and Austria during the months of March to May. In February 1935, the Folk-Lore Society elected Corbett as a member at its 57th annual meeting, where she was nominated by Violet Mason. That summer, Corbett and Dillon were travelling again, this time to Belgium, the Netherlands, Germany, Poland, Romania, Hungary, Austria and Czechoslovakia, as noted in her second travel diary.

In February 1938, she was awarded the Scout Medal, seven years before her brother became the Chief Scout. She became a JP in Oxfordshire, and in a 1938 case including youths stealing, they were put on probation by the board of magistrates including Corbett but given a 'stern warning'. In 1939, Corbett was re-appointed as honorary vice-president to her brother Lord Rowallan as president of the Scottish Band of Hope Union for temperance.

In 1946, Corbett was on the platform of the Oxfordshire Federation of the Women's Institutes Half-Yearly Council meeting. The following year, she briefed the Bloxham W.I. on the upcoming Albert Hall conference.

Her friend Kathleen Dillon died in 1958 and is buried in All Saints Churchyard, Spelsbury. Corbett dedicated an updated version of her local history book to her friend's "dear and gallant memory" (1962, edited by Lois Hey).

== Awards ==
- British War and Victory Medal
- Serbian Gold Medal for Devoted Service
- Scottish Woman's Hospital
- Scout Medal (engraved Hon. E. Corbett. 9–2–38)
- Scottish Women's Hospitals 1914 Medal

== Death and memorial ==
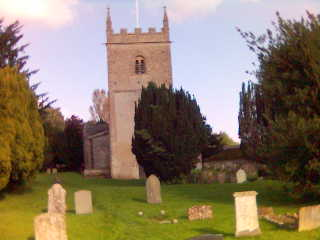
All Saints' Church, Spelsbury

Corbett died and was also buried near where her friend was laid, in All Saints Churchyard, Spelsbury in 1977.

In 2015 and 2016, Corbett was mentioned as among those being honoured as a "benefactor and friend "in a memorial service at St Sava Orthodox Church, London with the support of the Serbian Council of Great Britain, Serbian Society, Serbian City Club, Kolo Srpskih Sestara Kosovka Devojka and Britic and the Embassy of the Republic of Serbia in Great Britain.

== Portrayals ==
The organisation "Musical Theatre Australia" included Corbett as one of the characters in its production "A Girl's Guide to World War".
