= Katherine Stewart MacPhail =

Scottish physician (1887–1974)

Katherine Stewart MacPhail OBE
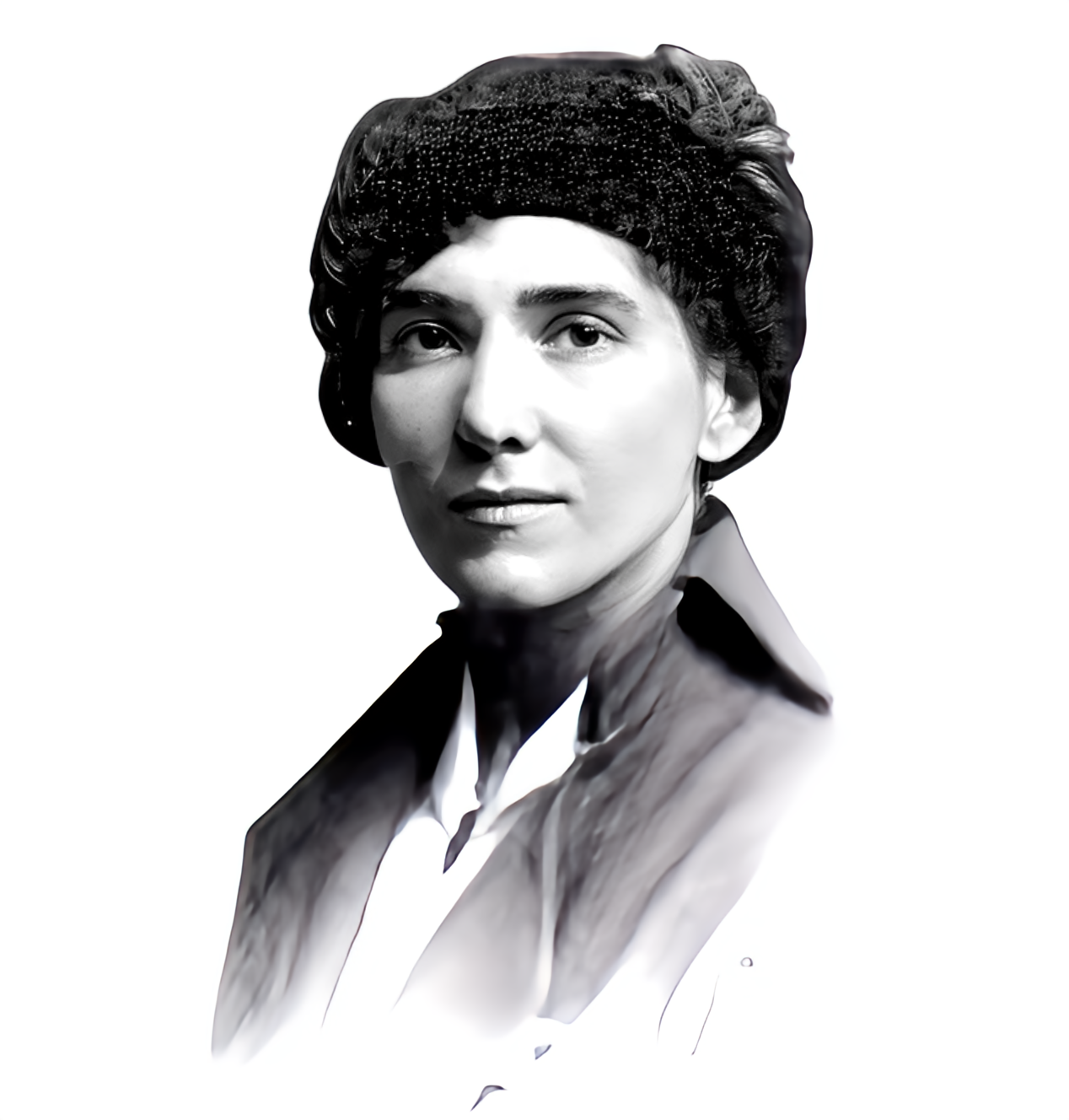
- Born: 30 October 1887; Glasgow, Scotland
- Died: 11 September 1974 (aged 86); St Andrews, Scotland
- Education: University of Glasgow
- Known for: Establishing Serbia's first children's hospital
- Medical career
- Profession: surgeon
- Institutions: Glasgow Royal Infirmary; Scottish Women's Hospitals for Foreign Service; Anglo-Serb Children's Hospital; English-Yugoslav Hospital for Treatment of Osteoarticular Tuberculosis
- Sub-specialties: War medicine and paediatric orthopaedic
- Awards: OBE; Order of St Sava; Honorary citizen of Coatbridge; Serbian Mail commemorative stamps

Katherine Stewart MacPhail OBE (30 October 1887 – 11 September 1974) was a Scottish surgeon. During World War I, she served as chief medical officer of two units of the Scottish Women's Hospitals for Foreign Service. She cared for the wounded in Serbia, France, and the Thessaloniki Front. In 1921, during her stay in Serbia, she founded the country's first children's hospital. While she is remembered as a national hero in Serbia, she was criticised by some for providing her expertise in Serbia rather than in her own country. Her honours include several medals, plaques, and a postage stamp.

== Early years and education ==
Katherine Stewart MacPhail was born in Glasgow on 30 October 1887, the third of four daughters of Jessie MacPhail and Dr Donald MacPhail, a doctor. MacPhail was the only daughter in the family who showed an interest in her father's work. As a young girl, she entered the father's office and watched him examine the patients or treat wounds; she also went with him to visit patients on remote farms. In addition, her decision to dedicate her life to medicine was probably influenced by her uncles who were successful doctors: James led a missionary hospital in India, and Alex was a professor of anatomy at the University of Glasgow.

MacPhail and her siblings were initially home-schooled by private teachers. Once they were old enough they attended the distant elementary school in Coatbridge, going on to study at Hillhead High School in Glasgow. All four children successfully completed their studies at the academy, and later at the University of Glasgow.

At that time in Scotland, it was unusual for women to study at all, and especially medicine. Of the well-educated women from reputable families, they were expected only to lead the household well and deal with art. Probably for this reason, her father was against his daughter's desire to study medicine. However, she had already demonstrated decisive determination and persistence, and he could not stand in the way of her decision. Her parents understood the importance of education, and on 26 April 1906 she enrolled to study medicine at the University of Glasgow. She was an excellent student, and received numerous awards for her studies: prizes in physiology (first class) and second class in practical zoology, anatomy and surgery. She graduated on 12 October 1911 with an MB ChB from University of Glasgow Medical School.

MacPhail began her medical career at the Glasgow Royal Infirmary, and she was also an assistant doctor at her father's clinic.

== World War I ==
=== Scotland, 1914 ===
When World War I broke out, MacPhail decided to volunteer for active service in the British Army and sent a letter to the War Office requesting to do so. The answer was fast, declining her request and explaining that the Royal Army Medical Corps did not accept women. She turned to the Red Cross, and received a similar response, as it too did not accept female doctors. She contacted Dr Elsie Inglis, who was recruiting women doctors and other medical staff for a women's volunteer medical units. Dr Inglis offered her hospital team to the British War Office, but was rejected by the sentence: "My dear lady, go home and sit still." Dr Inglis then sent letters to the embassies of France, Belgium, Russia and Serbia, who accepted this offer immediately and with gratitude.

"We knew we were being sent out under the auspices of the Suffrage Societies, and each was afraid that every other was a strong supporter, but were much relieved to find that almost none of us was what might be called 'strong', and that Serbia was the common bond, not suffrage."

From then, she began active work for the Scottish Women's Hospitals for Foreign Service which affiliated itself with the suffrage movement. As the units for France and Belgium had already been filled, MacPhail was in a dilemma whether to go to Serbia, which was little known in the United Kingdom at that time. MacPhail later said: "I really hardly knew where Serbia was, but from what I read, I knew it was very difficult for them." MacPhail accepted the offer and joined as the youngest in a group of 30 women who comprised the staff of the first unit of the Scottish Women's Hospital in Serbia. Her sister Isabel accompanied her as an orderly.

=== Serbia, 1915 ===
In mid-December 1914, MacPhail's group boarded a transport boat in Southampton. On the way to Malta, most members of the unit spent time learning Serbian. Immediately after Christmas, they boarded the ship Nile, which sailed to Piraeus. They arrived in Thessaloniki on 1 January 1915, and the next day boarded a train for Kragujevac, which was the headquarters of the Serbian army and military medical team. Though she was a junior doctor, she felt her skills were not being used appropriately.

In the year 1915, an epidemic of typhoid fever emerged among the Serbian army. In June 1915, when the epidemic was in decline, MacPhail became ill with a severe form of the infection. Her hearing was damaged by long-lasting high temperatures, and she lost her hair, so covered her head wearing a hat or a scarf for a long time. When she was healed, on the insistence of Admiral Ernest Troubridge, she left Serbia and returned to Scotland in order to recover completely. She reached Scotland in September 1915.

=== France, 1916 ===
As soon as she had recovered sufficiently, MacPhail contacted the Serbian Support Fund in London and began a campaign to help the organisation. She traveled all over Scotland, attended charity meetings and held lectures about her experiences in Serbia, appealing for help for the country.

As she was unable to return to Serbia, which by then was behind enemy lines, in January 1916, she joined the Friends charity, which worked in France. She worked at Shalona in Marni, in the Champagne region, northeast of Paris. In April 1916, she was offered a job in Corsica, and in May 1916, arrived in Bastia to work at a hospital. A few days after her arrival she went to Ajaccio, visiting a Scottish Women's Hospital. There, she met with several acquaintances she knew from Serbia, and they told her what was happening to their old unit. Finding that there were opportunities to return to Serbia, she interrupted her stay in Corsica, in order to try to organise the accommodation of Serbian orphans in the Friends home in the High Savai. However, this failed. Friends took over a hotel in Samoan, about 20 kilometres (12 mi) from the Swiss border, and turned it into a refugee camp. At the end of September 1916, MacPhail took over the duties of a doctor in this home. During her stay in France, Dr. Sondermayer, chief of the Sanitary Department of the Serbian Army, offered her a place in a hospital and MacPhail, immediately accepted the offer.

=== Serbia, 1917 ===
In the early spring of 1917, MacPhail was on the Thessaloniki front. In Thessaloniki, MacPhail located her younger sister, Isabel, who arrived there earlier with the Scottish Women's Hospital. Dr Sondermayer offered MacPhail and Isabel an opportunity to work in a newly formed large hospital, which France provided to the Serbian army, named the Serbian Hospital of Crown Prince Alexander.

A few days later, they received an invitation from the head of the Serbian Relielf Fund in Thessaloniki to come to their hospital in Sorović (today the Greek town of Amyntaio, near the Greek-Macedonian border) to help care for the injured civilian population during the bombing of Bitola and the surrounding area. MacPhail and Isabel as well as two other nurses and a cook were sent to the village of Brod, on the south-eastern side of the Bitola area. Isabel soon left Brod and returned to Thessaloniki to work in the Serbian hospital of Crown Prince Alexander, while MacPhail remained behind. At the end of the year, she traveled to Thessaloniki, returning to Brod with a serious illness. She was sure that it was a disease that was caused by long-term poor nutrition, and later it was identified as pellagra, then a little-known disease caused by a diet insufficient in vitamins.

At the end of 1917, the hospital of the Serbian Support Fund was moved from Sorović to Germijan near Brod, where MacPhail's outpatient clinic. At the same time, she approached her deadline to report to her post at the Serbian Hospital of Crown Prince Alexander in Thessaloniki. MacPhail was convinced that her medical help was far more needed in the villages, so she managed to persuade Dr Sondermayer to let her remain in Bitola. At that time, MacPhail was visited by her friend, Dr Edward W. Ryan, whom she showed the poor living conditions in the nearby villages. Seeing this, Ryan immediately began collecting aid through the American Red Cross, and managed to obtain a mobile outpatient unit, which was supplied with drugs and food supplies so that MacPhail could expand her work to improving the nutrition of vulnerable children.

During the winter of 1917–18, MacPhail was invited to a celebration where she first saw and met Crown Prince Alexander. In the Macedonian mountains, conditions were harsh and cold, but MacPhail with her mobile outpatient unit visited the surrounding villages regularly and did her job. In the meantime, her family and friends in Scotland collected warm clothes and footwear which she shared with impoverished women and children.

=== Scotland, 1918 ===
In the summer of 1918, MacPhail returned to Scotland for a short time to assist her father, Dr Donald MacPhail, who was working alone attending to patients who had contracted Spanish flu. When he contracted the flu, MacPhail and Isabel left Serbia, and the responsible parties accepted their reasons. MacPhail was awarded the Order of St. Sava IV class and the Medal of the Serbian Red Cross, while Isabel received the Cross of Mercy. In August 1918, the sisters MacPhail left Thessaloniki and returned to their native Scotland.

In Scotland, MacPhail cared for her sick father and some of his patients.

On 15 August 1918 MacPhail became an honorary citizen of Coatbridge, and at a special ceremony received the town's charter, and a gold watch.

MacPhail followed news of the offensives on the Thessaloniki front and the allies' breakthrough in September 1918.

== Interwar period ==
=== Return to Serbia ===
At the end of November 1918 MacPhail returned to Serbia. Clothing, footwear and other supplies to help Serbia, were collected by her family, friends and patients, were packaged and sent separately via the Red Cross. From London, MacPhail traveled to Paris and Toulon where she waited to board a ship to Dubrovnik. At that time Toulon was crowded with refugees from Serbia, soldiers and civilians trying to return home. In Toulon she met Darinka Grujic, who had been taking care of Serbian orphans and refugees in France since the beginning of the war, which she wanted to return to Serbia. After several days waiting in Toulon, she embarked for Dubrovnik, then traveled for three days to Sarajevo, Zemun and finally Belgrade.

After her arrival in Belgrade MacPhail applied to the Ministry of the Interior and was granted permission to stay to carryout charity work.

==== First Children's Hospital in Belgrade ====
At the beginning of 1919, she opened the first children's hospital in Belgrade. This was facilitated by Darinka Grujic securing five military barracks in Studenicka Street, near the Military Hospital, and giving one of the barracks to MacPhail to establish a children's hospital. British marines, under the command of Admiral Troubridge, cleaned, repaired and outfitted the barrack. A steriliser was installed along with 25 military beds, bedding, blankets and other supplies from Red Cross. Drugs and military supplies came from the American Red Cross. The Serbian Support Fund opened a charity kitchen for a nearby school, so MacPhail managed to arrange to supply this kitchen with food as well as for children at the hospital, while firewood was provided by the city government. Troubridge received many toys, and Florence Harvey offered to provide a car for free. At the end of January 1919, the hospital received its first patients.

During the first months of operation, every bed in the hospital was filled, and a large number of children attended the outpatient clinic. MacPhail performed all the medical work because there were few doctors as only about 100 had survived the war. Because of her work, MacPhail was popular in Belgrade, and was able to provide various types of assistance and donations for those who lacked financial means. Her efforts were supported by £1000 donations by Elsie Cameron Corbett and the Peter Coats Trust.

==== Pavilion in Topčider ====
By spring of 1919, the hospital was already too small in particular due to an increase in the number of children with tuberculosis. MacPhail learned that there was an empty and abandoned open pavilion that was previously used for children at Topčider, 10 kilometres (6.2 mi) from Belgrade. The pavilion was located on a hill, at the edge of a forest, so it was ideal for a treatment consisting of fresh air and sun, which, in addition to good food and rest, was at that time the only medicine for tuberculosis. MacPhail was granted a permit from the city government to arrange necessary repairs for the building and to procure equipment. By Easter 1919 the 40 bed pavilion received its first patients. It was managed by Mary Baker and soon proved to be successful with many children recovering. As an open pavilion it was only used in the summer months. It closed in 1924.

==== Anglo-Serbian Children's Hospital ====
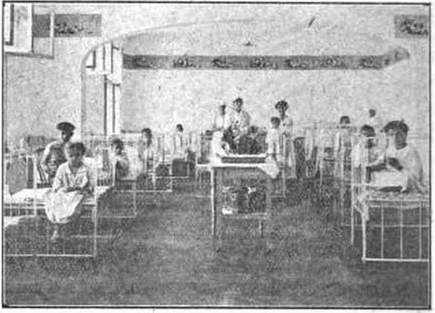
Anglo-Serbian Children's Hospital surgical ward

As the work expanded, MacPhail realised that the existing capacities would soon be insufficient for an increasing number of patients, especially because the top of the pavilion made it unusable in the winter, so she began to think about expanding the hospital. An enlarged building in Kneza Milosa Street, near the Military Hospital, was left empty when British marines left Belgrade and MacPhail immediately started the action to get that house for her hospital. It was a large, bright, well-built and preserved building that had enough space to accommodate 50 beds, especially when MacPhail succeeded in replacing large military beds for children's beds. In addition, a small operating room for easy surgical cases was formed, while severe surgical cases were sent to the state hospital. A large department for outpatient patients was also established. This new hospital began operating in November 1919, though it officially opened in February 1921. It was no longer an improvised institution, but a real medical institution. It was officially recognised by the Government of the Kingdom of Serbs, Croats and Slovenes as the first Children's Hospital in Serbia, called the Anglo-Serb Children's Hospital, abbreviated ASCH. It was the only children's hospital in what was now Yugoslavia. Shortly after the opening of this hospital, the Ministry of Health asked MacPhail to receive infants and newborns, so a special nursing department was also set up with treatment provided by the most experienced nurse. By 1921, MacPhail was hopeful to not only perfect this hospital, but to encourage the foundation of others and to train native nurses to work in them.

=== Dubrovnik ===
As the number of patients at Topcider had been steadily increasing, MacPhail came to the idea of finding a place on the seashore where she could accommodate children with tuberculous. She learned that there was a villa in Dubrovnik that would be ideal for this purpose. MacPhail contacted Zivojin Mišić who was then the head of the generalštab and whom MacPhail knew from the Thessaloniki front. When MacPhail explained to him that this villa in Dubrovnik should serve as a health center and a children's rest home, he immediately ordered the villa to be handed over to the English-Serbian children's hospital for further use. MacPhail's sister, Isabel, who was already volunteering at the Children's Hospital in Belgrade, traveled to Dubrovnik to see the building and find equipment for her. While in Dubrovnik, Isabel heard of an abandoned Austrian hospital near Zelenika in Boka Kotorska and traveled there to visit it. She found a deserted, fully equipped hospital, with beds, bedding and other material, and a young Serbian officer, Vasa Srdić, who oversaw the hospital with his soldiers. Srdić offered Isabel all that she needed, and he immediately arranged shipping and transport of equipment to Dubrovnik. Isabel selected 60 beds and other equipment. As the building itself was well preserved, the hospital was established in February 1920.

=== Sremska Kamenica ===
In the early 1930s, a report was submitted regarding the Anglo-Serbian Children's Hospital stating that during the preceding two years, 115 hospital patients were hospitalised (hospitalisation of some patients lasted up to 24 months), and 160 children were treated clinically, or outside the hospital. There were also 25 surgical procedures, 194 punctures and 113 x-ray imaging, and 84 immunisations with gypsum were performed. Fifty children left the hospital as successfully cured, 12 of them had improved health status during discharge, and the rest was on further treatment. The conclusion was that in spite of the small number of beds and a limited fund owned by the Anglo-Yugoslav hospital, she managed to fulfill all the tasks. The enormous costs of maintaining a hospital in Belgrade had become increasingly high year after year, and this, among other reasons, influenced MacPhail to start thinking about moving the hospital somewhere in the interior of the country, but not too far from Belgrade, which would be in open air with fresh air and sun. She even thought about buying one of the abandoned Fruška Gora monasteries. Darinka Grujic advised her to try to find a suitable building or to build a new building in Sremska Kamenica, which according to its natural conditions, was the most suitable place for this purpose. As MacPhail already had a holiday home in Sremska Kamenica, she immediately started making plans for the establishment of a new hospital.

MacPhail's friend, Vasa Srdić had been an officer of the Serbian army in Zelenika in the early 1920s and had helped Isabel, and subsequently became a great friend of the MacPhail sisters. After the war, as a graduate engineer of agronomy, he got land in Temerin, where he settled and was engaged in farming and fruit growing. Being aware of MacPhail's plans, he soon learned that on the hill Čardak, just above Sremska Kamenica, an old and abandoned vineyard was being sold which could suit MacPhail's plans. She was thrilled with the position of the city itself and its surroundings and bought the land, which was officially conveyed to her on 1 August 1933, and immediately began preparations for the construction of the hospital. According to Ketrin's idea and with the help of an engineer of the Hygienic Institute in Belgrade, an old Russian architect made plans for a three-winged building with a central courtyard and a long terrace along the north and west wing so that children can be in the sun all day.

In the spring of 1934, the work on the new hospital was completed, all necessary equipment was ordered, and lists of patients scheduled to start treatment were compiled. The Royal Commission of the Danube Banovina approved the opening of the children's sanatorium. The building consisted of a main frontal area and two symmetrically situated wings. The main part consisted of three departments of the hospital, a patient unit, a workshop, a radiotherapy department, a pharmacy section, a space intended for patients with infectious diseases and rooms for the sterilisation of instruments and appliances. Also, there was an area for the administration of the hospital, as well as a warehouse for medicines and instruments. In the wings of the building was a kitchen with a pantry and a dining room for children. On the first floor were four-room dormitories for doctors and nurses. There were also four bathrooms and toilets arranged in the wings of the building. The hospital was built in accordance with the needs of patients who anticipated a longer stay for treatment. There were terraces in front of the south and west wings. Even the courtyard was fenced and decorated like a park. The orchard and vineyard were also located within the yard.

The principal treatment of bone and joint tuberculosis at the time when antibiotics and antituberculotics did not exist consisted of increasing the general resistance of patients with hygienic and dietary regimen, fresh air therapy, heliotherapy (exposure to the sun during the day, during the winter exposure to artificial light), immobilisation and various surgical procedures. Special attention was also paid to hospital hygiene. School-age children attended daily classes that corresponded to their age and curriculum, after which they would receive a certificate at the end of the school year. The hospital also organised workshops that were part of the work therapy, where children attended art classes. Once a week, the Orthodox priest would come to provide the children with religious instruction. The hospital also had a library that was equipped with a large number of children's books, which were both educational and entertaining, and some toys.

The English-Yugoslav Hospital for Treatment of Osteoarticular Tuberculosis was officially opened on 23 September 1934, under the auspices of Her Majesty Queen Maria Karađorđević. The first patients were transferred from a Belgrade hospital as early as 1 August. The treatment was focused on patients with tuberculosis of the bones and joints, and rachitis. The treatment consisted of fresh air, sun exposure, good food, rest, massage, immobilisation with plaster and surgery if there was a need for it. The hospital received children under 14 years of age. During the year, there were up to 50 children, and over the winter, 32. The head of the hospital was MacPhail, the main surgeon was Svetislav Sojanović, the main nurse was Agnes Hardy, and Alice Murphy was a secretary. Among the staff, there were two other nurses, one teacher and auxiliary staff. One of the main problems of the hospital was funding, because the children were mostly treated for free. The cost of the hospital was covered by many donors. Among the donors, there was also the Ministry of Social Affairs and Public Health of the Kingdom of Yugoslavia, the Child Protection Fund, as well as various other organisations. All of this was not enough to cover the cost of the hospital, so for this reason, MacPhail had to constantly run a fundraising campaign in order to keep the hospital in operation. One of the earliest financial supporters was the Honourable Elsie Cameron Corbett, who donated £1000 in 1921. She continued to endow a bed at an annual cost of £50 until at least 1935.

In 1940, the situation in the region became serious and the sanatorium staff began to prepare with the military against an enemy attack. In February 1941, MacPhail had a plan to evacuate children from the hospital. Three weeks before the war, all children were sent from the hospital to their homes, and all the hospital equipment was packed and sheltered in the basements to be protected in the event of a bombing. The situation become very serious and the British Embassy advised all British citizens to leave the country. Not leaving in time, she and other British residents became the prisoners of the Germans before she was repatriated to Britain.

Soon thereafter, 120 soldiers were placed in the hospital for anti-aircraft patrols. The building was soon turned into a local hospital. The hospital staff often helped the partisan movement in the form of providing medical care and food, which was one of the reasons why the hospital was attacked. After that, the building was abandoned and destroyed.

== Post-World War Two ==
MacPhail returned to Belgrade after the liberation in 1945, as leader of a special unit of relief workers sent by Save the Children Fund. In a report published in the Daily Record in March 1945, which included a photograph of her, she described the local conditions. She noted that of a thousand beds, 920 were bare, and hospital equipment such as x-ray machines had been shattered or thrown into the Danube.

When she went to visit Sremska Kamenica, she encountered a building that was without a door and windows, empty and ruined. There was no longer any medical or electrical equipment in it. In July, MacPhail began negotiations over the reopening of a hospital in Sremska Kamenica with the help of the Child Protection Fund from London. The Ministry of Public Health of the Democratic Federative Yugoslavia gave permission to start the reconstruction on 15 August. With the help of staff, MacPhail managed to procure medical equipment and medical supplies to carry out the operation. From humanitarian organisations from Canada and the United Kingdom came bedding and blankets. The complete equipment from the surgery was found in a military hospital in Sremski Karlovci and was soon returned. Katherine also received 46 boxes of clothes and bedding for children from friends. The complete repair of the hospital was financed by the Government of the Autonomous Welfare of Vojvodina, and the hospital was restarted on 19 December 1945.

During the war, the number of children who had tuberculosis increased. The hospital now operated with a capacity of 75 beds and was permanently filled. The working conditions were difficult at that time due to the lack of equipment and food, as the supply of the hospital was difficult. During this period, the fruit trees and vineyards around the hospital were of great help. Soon, life and work at the hospital returned to normal. However, the new government slowly increased the amount of mistrust towards MacPhail and her associates. She proposed to the Ministry of Health to turn the hospital into a rehabilitation center for children with disabilities, as well as for children who became disabled due to tuberculosis or other illnesses. She also planned to build a workshop where adults with disabilities would help in the production of orthopedic aids.

In 1947, the new regime nationalised all hospitals, and the Anglo-Serb Children's Hospital was transferred to the Yugoslav authorities in the autumn of that year. After nationalisation, the hospital continued to exist as a state sanatorium for bone tuberculosis and was overseen by the Department of Orthopedic Surgery of the Medical Faculty in Belgrade, led by Professor Svetislav Stojanovic. Realising that nothing could prevent the implementation of the communist regime, MacPhail returned to Scotland in 1949, settling in St Andrews.

On 22 September 1954, to mark the 20th anniversary of the hospital's establishment, MacPhail visited the hospital in Sremska Kamenica and was greeted warmly: "The hospital looked like before, fresh, exposed to the sun and surrounded by rich vineyards. The children attended school classes, freshly-prepared meal awaited the children every day thanks to the staff from the kitchen." A memorial plaque was placed in the entrance hall with the inscription that she was its founder. This memorial plaque was a great sign of gratitude for her contribution during the war. Apart from MacPhail, the ceremony were attended by Alice Marfi and Flora Sands.

MacPhail died in St Andrews on 11 September 1974.

== Honours and legacy ==
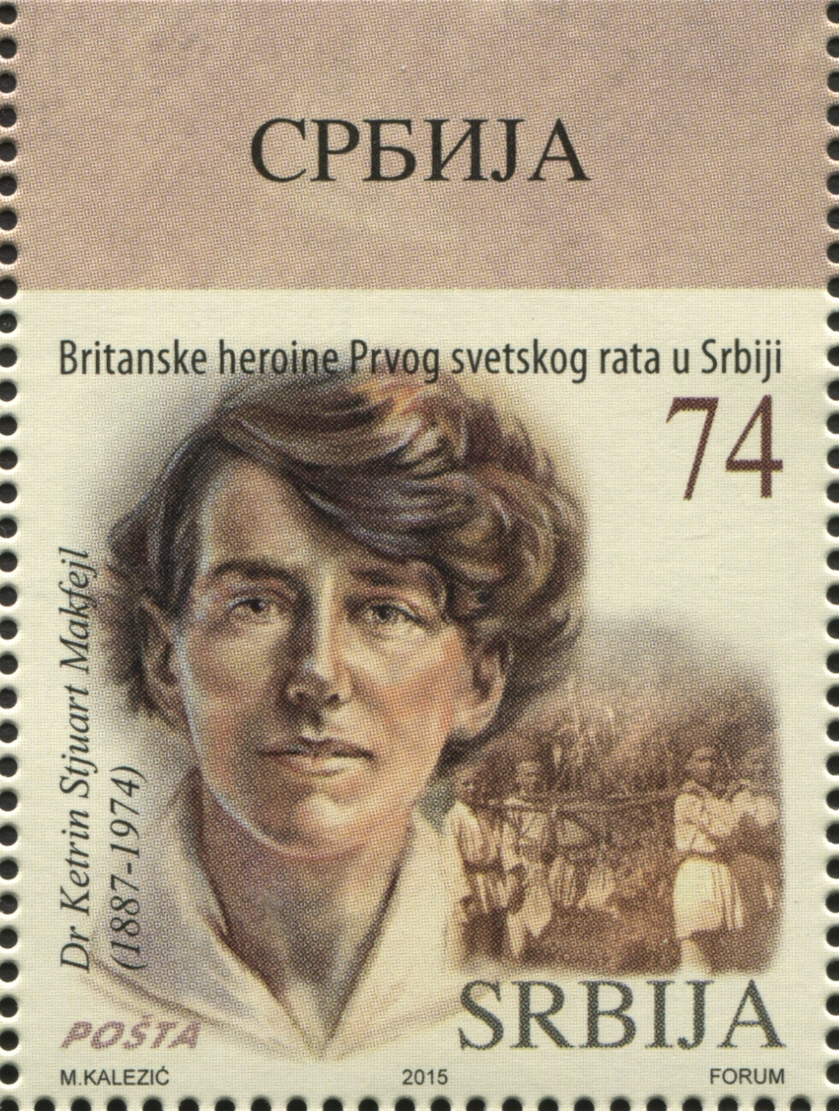
Postage stamp issued by Serbian Mail, 2015

During the World War I, MacPhail was decorated with the Order of St. Sava of the Fourth and Fifth degrees, and due to the humanitarian activities that followed the war, she received the Order of the Third Degree.

In 1932, she was awarded the Russian Red Cross insignia for her work.

In 1928, she received an OBE.

In 1954, on the 20th anniversary of the founding of her hospital, she became an honorary citizen of Sremska Kamenica and made the lifelong president of the Karlovac Red Cross.

On 15 June 1988, two memorial plaques were placed in the courtyard of the hospital and a monument was also erected in her honour.

In December 2015, Serbian Post in partnership with the British Embassy, Belgrade, issued a series of stamps commemorating British women's First World War efforts and 'universal suffrage, solidarity and gender equality and the part they played building relationships with leaders and communities in Serbia.' MacPhail was included in the series along with fellow doctors Elsie Inglis, Isobel Galloway Hutton, Evelina Haverfield and Elizabeth Ross and Captain Flora Sandes.

Her biography, Ever Yours Sincerely: The Life and Work of Dr Katherine S. MacPhail (Cambridge, 2007), was translated from Serbian to English by Muriel Heppell, from Želimir Dj. Mikić's original version in Serbian, Uvek vaša: život i delo dr Ketrin Makfejl (Novi Sad, 1998).

== See also ==
- Serbian Campaign of World War I
