= SS Hantonia =

History
- Name: TSS Hantonia
- Operator: 1911–1948: London and South Western Railway; 1923–1948: Southern Railway; 1948–1952: British Railways
- Port of registry: (United Kingdom)
- Builder: Fairfield, Govan
- Yard number: 482
- Launched: 23 December 1911
- Fate: Scrapped 7 June 1952

General characteristics
- Tonnage: 1,567 gross register tons (GRT)
- Length: 290.3 feet (88.5 m)
- Beam: 36.1 feet (11.0 m)
- Draught: 15.3 feet (4.7 m)

TSS Hantonia was a passenger vessel built for the London and South Western Railway in 1911.

== History ==
The ship was built by Fairfield Govan and launched on 23 December 1911 as Louvima, but in January 1912 renamed Hantonia. With her sister ship Normannia they entered service between Southampton and Le Havre. They were the first cross-channel steamers to be fitted with single-reduction geared Parsons' turbines, which gave the vessels a speed of over 20 knots but also cut down on the vibration experienced by cross-Channel passengers.

Hantonia was requisitioned by the Admiralty in 1914 and operated as a troopship during the First World War and after war service she was acquired by the Southern Railway in 1923.

In 1939 Hantonia was requisitioned for a second time by the Admiralty and transported troops between Folkestone and Calais until January 1940. She was then a Royal Navy accommodation ship until 1945. She returned to railway service in 1945 and was deployed on the Channel Islands service, where she returned children who had been evacuated before the German Invasion. From 1946 returned to the Southampton to Le Havre service.

In 1948 Hantonia was acquired by British Railways and was later retired and then scrapped in 1952.
