= SS Batavier II =

SS Batavier II may refer to one of the following ships of the Batavier Line:

- SS Batavier II (1897), packet on the Batavier Line's Rotterdam–London service; captured in World War I by German submarine UB-6 in September 1916; sunk by British submarine E55 in July 1917
- SS Batavier II (1921), built as a post-World War I replacement for the first Batavier II and used on primarily on Rotterdam–London service until passenger service ended in 1960; broken up, 1960
