= SS Batavier V =

SS Batavier V may refer to one of the following ships of the Batavier Line:

- SS Batavier V (1902), packet on the Batavier Line's Rotterdam–London service; captured in World War I by German submarine U-28 in March 1915; mined and sunk by German submarine UC-6 in May 1916
- SS Batavier V (1921), built as a post-World War I replacement for the first Batavier II and used on primarily on Rotterdam–London service until seized by German forces in 1940; sunk by British motor torpedo boat in 1941
- SS Batavier V (1959), built as a freight-only ship for Rotterdam–London service after passenger service ended in 1960; later named Satellite, Mohsein; broken up in 2004 in India
