= List of shipwrecks in July 1875 =

The list of shipwrecks in July 1875 includes ships sunk, foundered, grounded, or otherwise lost during July 1875.

== 1 July ==
List of shipwrecks: 1 July 1875
| Ship | State | Description |
|---|---|---|
| Lizzie Schallan | United Kingdom | The schooner collided with steamship Erin (United Kingdom) and sank at Liverpool, Lancashire, United Kingdom with the loss of two of her crew. Lizzie Schallan was on a voyage from Kingston, Jamaica to Liverpool. |
| Strathmore | United Kingdom | The ship was wrecked in the Crozet Islands. Of the 89 people on board, 44 survivors were rescued on 22 January 1876 by Young Phoenix (United States). Strathmore was on a voyage from London to Otago, New Zealand. |

== 2 July ==
List of shipwrecks: 2 July 1875
| Ship | State | Description |
|---|---|---|
| Janie Vivian | United Kingdom | The ship was driven ashore at the Point of Ayr, Cheshire. She was on a voyage from Rotterdam, South Holland, Netherlands to Connah's Quay, Flintshire. |
| Lotus | United Kingdom | The barque was driven ashore at "Cape St. John, Staten Island". Five crew took to a boat and were rescued on 10 July by Antoinette ( Canada) but two of them subsequently died. Lotus was on a voyage from Rio de Janeiro, Brazil to Callao, Peru. |

== 3 July ==
List of shipwrecks: 3 July 1875
| Ship | State | Description |
|---|---|---|
| Antioch | United Kingdom | The Mersey Flat was run into by the steamship Athensian (United Kingdom) and sank in the River Mersey at Liverpool, Lancashire during the launch of Athensian. Her crew were rescued. |
| Cattarina | Italy | The brigantine was wrecked near Portofino. Her crew were rescued. |
| Hilda | United Kingdom | The steamship struck a sunken rock and foundered. All on board were rescued. She was on a voyage from South Shields, County Durham to Trondheim, Norway. |
| Lady Louisa Kerr | United Kingdom | The schooner was abandoned in the Irish Sea. Her five crew were rescued by the steamship Voltaic (United Kingdom). Lady Louisa Kerr was on a voyage from Carrickfergus, County Antrim to the River Clyde. Although taken in tow, she sank off Donaghadee, County Down. |
| Mokanna | Belgium | The barque capsized in the Thanlwin. She was a total loss. |
| Petronella | Netherlands | The ship ran aground in the Bali Strait. She was on a voyage from Rotterdam, South Holland to Samarang, Netherlands East Indies. |
| Unnamed | Flag unknown | The schooner ran aground on the West Hoyle Bank, in Liverpool Bay and was abandoned by her crew. |

== 4 July ==
List of shipwrecks: 4 July 1875
| Ship | State | Description |
|---|---|---|
| Isabella | United Kingdom | The ship was wrecked on the Beltona Reef, in the Torres Strait. Eleven of her 34 crew reached Queensland in a boat. Authorities there were reluctant to send assistance. Only seven of the remaining 23 crew survived long enough to be rescued. Isabella was on a voyage from Newcastle, New South Wales to Hong Kong. |
| Shepherdess | United Kingdom | The ship was run into by the barque Witch (Germany) and sank off Great Yarmouth, Norfolk. Her crew were rescued. She was on a voyage from Sunderland, County Durham to Hastings, Sussex. |

== 5 July ==
List of shipwrecks: 5 July 1875
| Ship | State | Description |
|---|---|---|
| Lydia | United Kingdom | The schooner ran aground on the Blacktail Bank, in the Thames Estuary. She was on a voyage from Riga, Russia to London. She was refloated the next day. |

== 6 July ==
List of shipwrecks: 6 July 1875
| Ship | State | Description |
|---|---|---|
| Buenos Ayres | Italy | The barque collided with the steamship Marathon (United Kingdom) and sank in the River Mersey. All eighteen people on board were rescued by the tugs Agincourt and Sailor King (both United Kingdom). Buenos Ayres was on a voyage from Supe, Peru to Liverpool, Lancashire, United Kingdom. The wreck was dispersed by gunpowder on 16 July. |
| Heribet | United Kingdom | The ship ran aground at Grimsby, Lincolnshire. She was refloated and taken in to Grimsby in a leaky condition. |
| Irmãos | Portugal | The ship was driven ashore near Almería, Spain. She was on a voyage from Portimão to Palamós, Spain. |
| Pyrhha | Flag unknown | The steamship ran aground at "Stjollen", near Malmö, Sweden. She was refloated and resumed her voyage. |
| William Nelson | United Kingdom | The ship was driven ashore at Poorhead, County Cork. She was refloated and towed in to Queenstown, County Cork in a leaky condition. |
| Unnamed | Germany | The barque ran aground on the Maplin Sand, in the North Sea off the coast of Essex, United Kingdom. She was refloated. |

== 8 July ==
List of shipwrecks: 8 July 1875
| Ship | State | Description |
|---|---|---|
| Loch Laggan | United Kingdom | The ship ran aground on the Tuskar Rock. She was on a voyage from Liverpool, Lancashire to Melbourne, Victoria. Her passengers were placed aboard the Conibeg Lightship ( Trinity House). Loch Laggan was refloated and found to be severely leaky. She was towed to Ballyhack, County Wexford by the paddle steamer Great Western and beached. |
| Prince | United Kingdom | The steamship ran aground in the River Carron. She was on a voyage from Grangemouth, Stirlingshire to Palermo, Sicily, Italy. |

== 9 July ==
List of shipwrecks: 9 July 1875
| Ship | State | Description |
|---|---|---|
| Cheshire Witch | United Kingdom | The schooner went aground in fog in Donaghadee Sound, County Down and broke in two, Maryport for Belfast with coal. |
| Clarissa | United Kingdom | The ship sank at Liverpool, Lancashire. |
| Emma | United Kingdom | The brig ran aground on the Maiden Rock, in the Belfast Lough. She was refloated and taken in to Belfast, County Antrim. |
| Mina | Netherlands | The schooner was driven ashore at Cabadello Point, Portugal. She was refloated and resumed her voyage. |

== 10 July ==
List of shipwrecks: 10 July 1875
| Ship | State | Description |
|---|---|---|
| Coureur | France | The ship was driven ashore at St. Ives, Cornwall, United Kingdom. |
| Flying Fish | United Kingdom | The schooner sprang a leak and was beached at Arklow, County Wicklow. She was on a voyage from Liverpool, Lancashire to Waterford. |
| Guiding Star | United Kingdom | The tug ran aground on the Tuskar Rock. She was refloated with assistance from the tugs Merry Andrew and Viscount (both United Kingdom) and towed in to Waterford. |
| Heiress | United Kingdom | The schooner collided with the barque Hebe (Sweden) and sank in the North Sea off the Newarp Lightship ( Trinity House) with the loss of one of her six crew. |
| Linnet | United Kingdom | The fishing trawler foundered in the North Sea off Salthouse, Norfolk. Her crew survived. |
| Margarethe | Flag unknown | The ship ran aground in the River Thames at Erith, Kent, United Kingdom. |

== 11 July ==
List of shipwrecks: 11 July 1875
| Ship | State | Description |
|---|---|---|
| Amphitrite | United Kingdom | The schooner ran aground on the Black Rock, in the Belfast Lough. She was on a voyage from Newry, County Antrim to Preston, Lancashire. |
| Bessie | United Kingdom | The schooner ran aground on the Maplin Sand, in the North Sea off the coast of Essex. She was on a voyage from Plymouth, Devon to Woolwich, Kent. She was refloated and resumed her voyage. |
| Glenlussa | United Kingdom | The smack ran aground at Glenarm, County Antrim and was wrecked. |
| John Tennant | United Kingdom | The steamship was driven ashore and wrecked at Cape Finisterre, Spain. All on board, her crew and 113 passengers, were rescued. She was on a voyage from Calcutta, India to London. |
| Robert | United Kingdom | The barge sank at Cowes, Isle of Wight. She was on a voyage from Langstone, Hampshire to Cowes. |

== 12 July ==
List of shipwrecks: 12 July 1875
| Ship | State | Description |
|---|---|---|
| Bayones | Spain | Third Carlist War: The steamship was wrecked near Motrico. Her crew were rescued by Carlist fishing boats and held hostage. They were released on 25 July. |
| Jane Kilgour | United Kingdom | The ship ran aground on Saltholm, Denmark. She was on a voyage from Copenhagen, Denmark to a Baltic port. |
| Light of the Age | United Kingdom | The ship ran aground at Norrköping, Sweden. |
| Rowena | United Kingdom | The brig ran aground on the Cockle Sand, in the North Sea off the coast of Norfolk. She was refloated and assisted in to Great Yarmouth, Norfolk. |

== 13 July ==
List of shipwrecks: 13 July 1875
| Ship | State | Description |
|---|---|---|
| Betty and Emma | Germany | The barque was abandoned in the Min River. Her crew were rescued. She was on a voyage from Cardiff, Glamorgan, United Kingdom to the Min River. |
| Burgos | United Kingdom | The steamship ran aground in the Dardanelles. She was on a voyage from Cardiff, Glamorgan to Odesa, Russia. |
| Lily | United Kingdom | The ship was driven ashore. She was on a voyage from Guernsey, Channel Islands to London. She was refloated and taken in to Gravesend, Kent in a leaky condition. |

== 14 July ==
List of shipwrecks: 14 July 1875
| Ship | State | Description |
|---|---|---|
| Comete | France | The barque was destroyed by fire in the Bangka Strait with the loss of a crew member. She was on a voyage from Singapore, Straits Settlements to Marseille, Bouches-du-Rhône. |
| Earl of Stair | United Kingdom | The schooner was driven ashore and severely damaged on Sanda Island, Argyllshire. |
| Lerwick | New Zealand | The 14-ton cutter stranded on rocks in Bluff Harbour, New Zealand, and became a wreck. |
| Louise Besselmann | Germany | The barque was wrecked on Neckmansgrund. Her crew were rescued. She was on a voyage from Grangemouth, Stirlingshire, United Kingdom to Kronstadt, Russia. |
| Princess Alexandra | (United Kingdom of Great Britain and Ireland) Jersey | The ship departed from Jersey for Berwick upon Tweed, Northumberland. No further trace, presumed foundered with the loss of all hands. |
| Rachelina | Italy | The schooner was driven ashore at Lagos, Lagos Colony. |
| Venus | United Kingdom | The smack was driven ashore at Saundersfoot, Pembrokeshire. Her crew were rescued. She was on a voyage from Newport, Monmouthshire to Fremington, Devon. |
| Mary Elizabeth | United Kingdom | The ship was wrecked on the Minquiers, in the Channel Islands. |

== 15 July ==
List of shipwrecks: 15 July 1875
| Ship | State | Description |
|---|---|---|
| Africana | Canada | The foundered at Port Alfred, Cape Colony. Her crew survived. She was on a voyage from Calcutta, India to New York, United States. |
| Charlie | United Kingdom | The ship was driven ashore at Wexford. She was on a voyage from Newport, Monmouthshire to Wexford. She was refloated on 20 July. |
| Eden | United Kingdom | The brig was driven ashore on the south point of Öland, Sweden. She was on a voyage from Newcastle upon Tyne, Northumberland to Norrköping, Sweden. |
| Fanny | Austria-Hungary | The full-rigged ship ran aground at Kertch, Russia. She was refloated the next day. |
| New Zealand | United Kingdom | The brigantine was driven ashore at Wexford. Her crew were rescued by rocket apparatus. She was on a voyage from Saundersfoot, Pembrokeshire to Wexford. She was refloated on 20 July. |
| Snorro Storlassen | Flag unknown | The brig was wrecked at the mouth of the Kowie River. |
| Soeblomsten | Norway | The ship ran aground at Newhaven, Sussex, United Kingdom. She capsized the next day. |
| Theodor | Germany | The ship was driven ashore in South Bay, County Wexford. She was on a voyage from Memel to Wexford. |

== 16 July ==
List of shipwrecks: 16 July 1875
| Ship | State | Description |
|---|---|---|
| Alice | United Kingdom | The Thames barge collided with the steamship T. E. Forster and sank in the River Thames at Blackwall, Middlesex. |
| Catherine | Germany | The barque was driven ashore at Cape Henlopen, Delaware, United States. She was refloated and resumed her voyage. |
| Champlain II | United States | Champlain II The 244-foot (74 m) sidewheel paddle steamer ran aground at night and was wrecked in Lake Champlain at Split Rock Mountain between Barn Rock and Rock Harbor off Steam Mill Point, Westport, New York. Her wreck sank in 15 to 35 feet (4.6 to 10.7 m) of water at 44°12.36′N 073°22.58′W. |
| Ennerdale | United Kingdom | The steamship ran aground in the Dardanelles. She was on a voyage from Nicolaieff, Russia to Marseille, Bouches-du-Rhône, France. She was refloated and resumed her voyage. |
| Leader | United Kingdom | The schooner was abandoned off the Smalls Lighthouse, Cornwall. Her crew were rescued by Christabel (United Kingdom). Leader was on a voyage from Newport, Monmouthshire to Limerick. |
| May Flower | United Kingdom | The ship collided with a lighter and sank at Rotterdam, South Holland, Netherlands. |
| Planet | United Kingdom | The barque was driven ashore between Cartagena and Portmán, Spain. She was on a voyage from Newcastle upon Tyne, Northumberland to Cartagena. She floated off but consequently sank. Her crew were rescued by the tug Robert Scott (United Kingdom). |
| Thames | United Kingdom | The steamship was severely damaged by fire at Stockton-on-Tees, County Durham. |

== 17 July ==
List of shipwrecks: 17 July 1875
| Ship | State | Description |
|---|---|---|
| Corregidor | Flag unknown | The steamship was wrecked in Albay Bay. |
| Hero | United Kingdom | The ship ran aground on the Wolves Rocks, in the Bristol Channel west of Flat Holm. Her crew survived She was on a voyage from Newport, Monmouthshire to Cork. She was refloated and taken in to Newport in a leaky condition. |
| Sarah Ann | United Kingdom | The schooner was wrecked on Wolves Rocks. |

== 18 July ==
List of shipwrecks: 18 July 1875
| Ship | State | Description |
|---|---|---|
| Herder | United Kingdom | The steamship ran aground near Blankenese, Germany. |

== 19 July ==
List of shipwrecks: 19 July 1875
| Ship | State | Description |
|---|---|---|
| Ariel | United Kingdom | The herring boat was wrecked at Montrose, Forfarshire. Her crew were rescued. She was on a voyage from Montrose to Aberdeen. |
| Audax | United Kingdom | The brig sprang a leak and foundered in the Atlantic Ocean 25 nautical miles (46 km) off Brava Island, Cape Verde Islands. Her crew survived. She was on a voyage from Liverpool, Lancashire to Africa. |
| Emus | Spain | The brig was wrecked near "Puntarenas", Spanish East Indies. She was on a voyage from Manila to Cagayan. |
| Princess Alexandra | United Kingdom | The ship departed from Jersey, Channel Islands for Spittal, Northumberland. No further trace, presumed foundered with the loss of all hands. |

== 20 July ==
List of shipwrecks: 20 July 1875
| Ship | State | Description |
|---|---|---|
| Lothair | United Kingdom | The ship was sighted in the Atlantic Ocean whilst on a voyage from Liverpool, Lancashire to Valparaíso, Chile. No further trace, presumed foundered with the loss of all hands. |
| Nile | United Kingdom | The ship ran aground. She was on a voyage from Philadelphia, Pennsylvania to Antwerp, Belgium or Bremen, Germany. She was refloated and resumed her voyage. |
| Triton | Norway | The ship sank at Dunkirk, Nord, France. She was on a voyage from Nordmaling, Sweden to Dunkirk. |

== 21 July ==
List of shipwrecks: 21 July 1875
| Ship | State | Description |
|---|---|---|
| Abbotsford | United Kingdom | The steamship was driven ashore in Cummons Bay, Anglesey. Her passengers were taken off. She was refloated. |
| Angelo Antonio | Flag unknown | The ship caught fire and was beached on the coast of Brazil. She was on a voyage from Liverpool, Lancashire, United Kingdom to Callao, Peru. |
| Carl | Norway | The barque ran aground, heeled over and sank at Grangemouth, Stirlingshire, United Kingdom. She was on a voyage from Langesund to Grangemouth. |
| Forfait | French Navy | An artist′s impression of Forfait sinking. The screw corvette sank without loss of life in the Tyrrhenian Sea off the east coast of Corsica after colliding with the ironclad central battery ship Jeanne d'Arc during naval exercises. Jeanne d'Arc was severely damaged. |
| Minklina | Russia | The ship ran aground at Nidingen, Sweden. She was on a voyage from Riga to Bo'ness, Lothian, United Kingdom. She was refloated and taken in to Gothenburg, Sweden in a leaky condition. |
| Zest | United Kingdom | The steamship ran aground on rocks near the Cabo da Roca, Portugal. Her crew were rescued. She was on a voyage from Genoa, Italy to Liverpool, Lancashire. She had broken up by mid-August. |

== 23 July ==
List of shipwrecks: 23 July 1875
| Ship | State | Description |
|---|---|---|
| Abbotsford | United Kingdom | The steamship heeled over and sank off Anglesey. |
| Hero | New Zealand | The 29-ton cutter was discovered floating empty and abandoned off the east coast of New Zealand's North Island. Only one of the crew of three survived, who came ashore near Mokau. The ship had sprung a leak and was labouring in a heavy swell when the mast gave way. The crew took to the ship's boat, but it capsized and the other two crew members were drowned. |

== 25 July ==
List of shipwrecks: 25 July 1875
| Ship | State | Description |
|---|---|---|
| Isabella | United Kingdom | The barque ran aground on "Akbouron", Russia. She was refloated and taken in to Kertch, Russia. |

== 26 July ==
List of shipwrecks: 26 July 1875
| Ship | State | Description |
|---|---|---|
| Eliza Ramden | New South Wales | The barque struck a sunken rock off Queenscliff, Victoria and sank. Her crew were rescued by the Queenscliff Lifeboat. She was on a voyage from Melbourne, Victoria to Newcastle. |
| Paris Port de Mar | France | The barque was driven ashore and wrecked at Pernambuco, Brazil. She was on a voyage from Bahia to Aracaju, Brazil. |
| No. 15 | United Kingdom | The lighter was run down and sunk in the Clyde by the paddle steamer Duke of Leinster (United Kingdom) with the loss of one of her two crew. The captain of Duke of Leinster was subsequently acquitted of a charge of culpable homicide. |

== 27 July ==
List of shipwrecks: 27 July 1875
| Ship | State | Description |
|---|---|---|
| Findlay | United Kingdom | The ship ran aground at Tønning, Germany. She was on a voyage from West Hartlepool, County Durham to Tønning. |
| Fusi Yama | China | The steamship sprang a leak and was beached at "Nyangking". She was on a voyage from Hankou (Hankow) to Shanghai. |
| Marquis of Lorne | United Kingdom | The steamship ran aground on the Zuid, off the Dutch coast. She was refloated the next day but ran aground again. She was on a voyage from Maryport, Cumberland to Maassluis, South Holland, Netherlands. She was refloated on 30 July. |
| Nordlyset | Sweden | The ship was driven ashore near "Hallnaes", Öland. She was on a voyage from Norrköping to an English port. She was refloated on 5 August and taken in to Oskarshamn. |
| Rosewood | United Kingdom | The brigantine departed from Troon, Ayrshire for Matanzas, Cuba. No further trace, presumed foundered with the loss of all ten crew. |
| HMS Valorous | Royal Navy | The Magicienne-class frigate ran aground 10 nautical miles (19 km) off Holstenborg, Greenland. She was refloated and taken in to Holstenborg, where she was repaired. |
| Veritas | Germany | The ship ran aground at Kastrup, Denmark. She was refloated and taken in to Copenhagen, Denmark. |

== 28 July ==
List of shipwrecks: 28 July 1875
| Ship | State | Description |
|---|---|---|
| Blue Cross | United Kingdom | The steamship was driven ashore on the coast of the Courland Governorate. She was on a voyage from Kiel, Germany to Riga, Russia. She was later refloated and taken in to Bolderāja, Russia, where she arrived on 2 August. |
| Boreas | Norway | The brig ran aground near Helsingborg, Sweden. She was on a voyage from Narva, Russia to Montrose, Forfarshire. She was refloated with the assistance of a steamship. |
| Elvira | United Kingdom | The ship ran aground on Hirsholmene, Denmark. She was on a voyage from Blyth, Northumberland to Kalundborg, Sweden. She was refloated and towed in to Frederikshavn, Denmark in a leaky condition. |
| Emma Trechmann | United Kingdom | The steamship was driven ashore at "Stubben", Denmark. She was on a voyage from Saint Petersburg, Russia to London. She was refloated. |
| Jeune Hortense | France | The ship ran aground on the Scroby Sands Norfolk, United Kingdom. She was on a voyage from Middlesbrough, Yorkshire to Vannes, Morbihan. She was refloated and assisted in to Great Yarmouth, Norfolk in a leaky condition. |
| Lady Catherine | United Kingdom | The steamship collided with the steamship Milo (United Kingdom) and sank at Swinemünde, Germany. She was on a voyage from Sunderland, County Durham to Swinemünde. |
| Maynards | United Kingdom | The ship ran aground on the Droogden, in the Baltic Sea. She was on a voyage from Loviisa, Grand Duchy of Finland to Hartlepool, County Durham. |
| Squirrel | United Kingdom | The schooner ran aground at Larache, Morocco. She was refloated the next day. |
| Walter Thomas | United Kingdom | The ship ran aground at Lindisfarne, Northumberland. |

== 29 July ==
List of shipwrecks: 29 July 1875
| Ship | State | Description |
|---|---|---|
| Alice | United Kingdom | The schooner was driven ashore at Robin Hoods Bay, Yorkshire. She was on a voyage from Southampton, Hampshire to Middlesbrough, Yorkshire. |
| Emil | Sweden | The ship was driven ashore at Kastrup, Denmark. She was on a voyage from Nantes, Loire-Inférieure, France to Stockholm. |
| Jane Young | United Kingdom | The ship ran aground at New York, United States. She was refloated and resumed her voyage. |
| Marian | United Kingdom | The ship was driven ashore at Calcutta, India. She was on a voyage from Calcutta to London. |
| Parthenia | United Kingdom | The ship was driven ashore at Hornbæk, Denmark. |
| St. Brycedale | (United Kingdom of Great Britain and Ireland) Tasmania | The barque was driven ashore and wrecked on Bird Island. |

== 30 July ==
List of shipwrecks: 30 July 1875
| Ship | State | Description |
|---|---|---|
| Astrea | United Kingdom | The ship was driven ashore at Redcar, Yorkshire. She was refloated on 2 August and taken in to Hartlepool, County Durham in a leaky condition. |
| Dundee | United Kingdom | The steamship ran aground at Newport-on-Tay, Fife. She was on a voyage from Dundee, Forfarshire to Newport-on-Tay. She was refloated. |
| Forward | United Kingdom | The smack was driven ashore at Gourock, Renfrewshire. She was on a voyage from Glasgow, Renfrewshire to Port Bannatyne, Isle of Bute. |
| Maria | Germany | The schooner was driven ashore at Macduff, Aberdeenshire, United Kingdom. Her five crew were rescued by rocket apparatus. |
| Nelusko | United Kingdom | The steamship caught fire and was abandoned off Madeira. Her crew were rescued by Africa (United Kingdom). Nelusko was on a voyage from the River Plate to Antwerp, Belgium. |
| Petrino | Italy | The brig collided with the schooner Ocean Swell (United Kingdom) off Cape Spartel, Morocco and was abandoned. Her crew were rescued by Ocean Swell. Petrino was on a voyage from Liverpool, Lancashire, United Kingdom to Syros, Greece. |

== 31 July ==
List of shipwrecks: 31 July 1875
| Ship | State | Description |
|---|---|---|
| Dispatch | United Kingdom | The schooner was wrecked on the Cross Sand, in the North Sea off the coast of Norfolk. Her five crew were rescued by the fishing smack Shannon (United Kingdom). |
| Nelusko | Belgium | The steamship caught fire off Madeira and was abandoned by her crew, seventeen of whom were reported missing. She was on a voyage from Rio de Janeiro, Brazil to Havre de Grâce, Seine-Inférieure, France. She was taken in tow by the steamship Africa (United Kingdom) but sank off the Desertas Islands. |

== Unknown date ==
List of shipwrecks: Unknown date in July 1875
| Ship | State | Description |
|---|---|---|
| Claushefty | United Kingdom | The ship foundered at sea. She was on a voyage from Newcastle upon Tyne, Northumberland to Quebec City, Canada. |
| Comayeux | France | The schooner foundered off the Horn Reef. Her crew were rescued by the smack Tornado (United Kingdom). |
| Ellibank | United Kingdom | The full-rigged ship was wrecked at "Timari". |
| Fortuna | Norway | The brig was abandoned in the North Sea before 21 July. She was taken in tow by tow smacks, which took herr in to Hull, Yorkshire, United Kingdom, where she was beached. |
| John Clarke | United Kingdom | The ship was driven ashore and severely damaged at Cape Cove, Newfoundland Colony. She was refloated and taken in to Gaspé, Quebec. |
| Julia Esson | Canada | The ship capsized in the Atlantic Ocean. |
| Kanagadwa Maru | Japan | The steamship ran aground at Wusong, China. She was refloated. |
| Lamsden | New South Wales | The ship struck a sunken rock and foundered. Her crew were rescued. |
| Liberty | United Kingdom | The ship was abandoned in the Strait of Belle Isle. She was on a voyage from Quebec City to Dundee, Forfarshire. She was subsequently taken in to Quebec City. |
| Pass-by | United Kingdom | The ship was driven ashore on Eleuthera, Bahamas. |
| Primrose | United Kingdom | The ship was driven ashore at Porto, Portugal. She was refloated. |
| Skandinav | Norway | The brig collided with another vessel and was abandoned in the English Channel. |
| T. H. Haviland | United States | The ship was abandoned at sea before 28 July. She was on a voyage from Naguabo, Puerto Rico to New York. |
| Titian | United Kingdom | The steamship was driven ashore at Kertch, Russia. She was refloated on 11 July. |
| Unnamed | Ottoman Empire | The caïque was wrecked at Giurgevo. |
| Two unnamed vessels | Greece | The ships were wrecked at Giurgevo . |
