= List of shipwrecks in September 1859 =

The list of shipwrecks in September 1859 includes ships sunk, foundered, grounded, or otherwise lost during September 1859.

== 1 September ==
List of shipwrecks: 1 September 1859
Ship	State	Description
Beal	United Kingdom	The ship was driven ashore at the Tolbuchin Lighthouse, Russia. She was on a voyage from Sunderland, County Durham to Kronstadt, Russia. She was refloated the next day with the assistance from a tug and taken in to Kronstadt.
Stridente	French Navy	The Alerte-class gunboat was driven ashore and wrecked at Rufisque, Senegal.
Rebecca and Sarah	United Kingdom	The ship was wrecked on the Hinder Sand, in the North Sea off the Dutch coast. Her crew were rescued. She was on a voyage from Newcastle upon Tyne, Northumberland to Rotterdam, South Holland.
Venete	France	The barque was wrecked at Cannoniers Point, Mauritius. She was on a voyage from Calcutta, India to a European port.
Vollenhove	Netherlands	The ship foundered in the North Sea. Her crew were rescued by Trompen (Netherlands). Vollenhove was on a voyage from Newcastle upon Tyne to Zwolle, Overijssel.

== 2 September ==
List of shipwrecks: 2 September 1859
Ship	State	Description
Harbinger	United Kingdom	The ship was wrecked at Hastings, Sussex. Her crew were rescued. She was on a voyage from Seaham, County Durham to Hastings.
Mellaneah	United Kingdom	The schooner foundered in the English Channel 9 nautical miles (17 km) off Saint-Valery-sur-Somme, Somme, France with the loss of all five crew.
Mentor	United Kingdom	The ship ran aground on the Westerberm, off the coast of Zeeland, Netherlands. She was on a voyage from Amble, Northumberland to Antwerp, Belgium.
Renovation	United Kingdom	The ship ran aground on the Sunk Sand, in the North Sea off the coast of Essex. She was on a voyage from Hull, Yorkshire to Plymouth, Devon. She was refloated.

== 3 September ==
List of shipwrecks: 3 September 1859
Ship	State	Description
Hibernia	United Kingdom	The ship was driven ashore and wrecked on Hogland, Russia. She was on a voyage from Vyborg, Grand Duchy of Finland to Sunderland, County Durham.
Rival	United Kingdom	The schooner was wrecked on Texel, North Holland, Netherlands. Her crew were rescued. She was on a voyage from a British port to Hamburg

== 4 September ==
List of shipwrecks: 4 September 1859
Ship	State	Description
Josiah Quincy	United States	The ship was abandoned in the Atlantic Ocean. Her crew were rescued by Eddystone (United Kingdom). Josiah Quincy was on a voyage from Livorno, Grand Duchy of Tuscany to Boston, Massachusetts.
Lord Seaham	United Kingdom	The brig ran aground on the Patch Sand, in the North Sea. She was refloated and put in to Great Yarmouth, Norfolk in a severely leaky condition and took on extra hands.
Maxim	United Kingdom	The ship was abandoned off the coast of Kent and subsequently sank. Her crew were rescued by Zoanstrom (Flag unknown). Maxim was on a voyage from South Shields, County Durham to Bordeaux, Gironde, France.
Miltiades	Greece	The ship departed from Malta for Falmouth, Cornwall, United Kingdom. No further trace, presumed foundered with the loss of all hands.
Suffolk	(United Kingdom of Great Britain and Ireland) New South Wales	The brig ran aground off Tuggerah Beach. Her crew were rescued. She was on a voyage from Launceston, Tasmania, to Newcastle.

== 5 September ==
List of shipwrecks: 5 September 1859
Ship	State	Description
Active	United Kingdom	The ship ran aground on the Dudgeon Sandbank, in the North Sea. She was on a voyage from London to Sunderland, County Durham. She was refloated and put in to Great Yarmouth, Norfolk.
Francis	United Kingdom	The barque struck the pier and was severely damaged at Great Yarmouth.
Gallego	United Kingdom	The ship was run ashore in Table Bay. She was refloated.

== 6 September ==
List of shipwrecks: 6 September 1859
Ship	State	Description
Fame	United Kingdom	The brig was wrecked on the Shipwash Sand, in the North Sea off the coast of Suffolk. Her five crew were rescued by the smack John and William (United Kingdom). Fame was on a voyage from South Shields, County Durham to London.
Josephine	France	The ship was wrecked whilst on a voyage from Saint Pierre Island to Réunion. Her crew were rescued by Bacchus (United Kingdom).

== 7 September ==
List of shipwrecks: 7 September 1859
Ship	State	Description
Neptune	United Kingdom	The ship was lost in the "Myoor River" Burma. Her crew survived.
Olive	United Kingdom	The paddle tug caught fire and sank at Sunderland, County Durham.
Porto Franco	Kingdom of Sardinia	The ship was severely damaged by fire at Genoa.
Quickstep	United Kingdom	The brig ran aground on the Goodwin Sands. She was refloated. She was refloated with the assistance of the Ramsgate Lifeboat, a tug and somed luggers and assisted in to Ramsgate, Kent.

== 8 September ==
List of shipwrecks: 8 September 1859
Ship	State	Description
August Marie	France	The ship was wrecked on the Holm Sand, in the North Sea off the coast of Suffolk, United Kingdom. She was on a voyage from Newcastle upon Tyne, Northumberland, United kingdom to Dieppe, Seine-Inférieure.
Grace Darling	United Kingdom	The smack was wrecked at Carradale Point, on the Mull of Kintyre, Argyllshire with the loss of all three crew. She was on a voyage from Ardrossan, Ayrshire to West Loch Tarbert.
Jeune Marie	France	The ship was driven ashore near Ostend, West Flanders, Belgium. She was on a voyage from Grimsby, Lincolnshire, United Kingdom to Bordeaux, Gironde. She was refloated and taken in to Ostend in a severely leaky condition.

== 9 September ==
List of shipwrecks: 9 September 1859
Ship	State	Description
Brothers	United Kingdom	The ship was driven ashore at Broughty Ferry, Forfarshire. She was on a voyage from the River Tyne to Dundee. She was refloated on 13 September and taken in to Dundee.
Catherines	United Kingdom	The ship sank in the North Sea 15 nautical miles (28 km) south east of St. Abbs Head, Berwickshire with the loss of one of the five people on board. Survivors were rescued by the galiot Gezina Abena (Netherlands). Catherines was on a voyage from Hartlepool, County Durham to Dundee, Forfarshire.
Elizabeth	United Kingdom	The sloop foundered in Wigtown Bay with the loss of a crew member. She was on a voyage from Irvine, Ayrshire to Freetown, Sierra Leone.
Great Eastern	United Kingdom	Great Eastern The steamship was severely damaged by a boiler explosion in the English Channel off Hastings, Sussex with the loss of six lives.
Industry	United Kingdom	The sloop ran aground and sank at Lindisfarne, Northumberland. She was on a voyage from Newcastle upon Tyne, Northumberland to Warrenpoint, County Antrim. She was refloated on 13 September and taken in to Lindisfarne in a severely damaged condition.
Intrepid	United Kingdom	The schooner was discovered derelict off the Hilbre Islands, Cheshire. She was taken in to Flint.
John and Mary	United Kingdom	The ship foundered off the coast of South America. All on board survived.
Maggie Miller	United Kingdom	The ship driven ashore at Calcutta, India. She was refloated the next day.
Phoebe	United Kingdom	The schooner was driven ashore on the west coast of the Isle of Bute with the loss of a crew member. She was on a voyage from Ardrossan, Ayrshire to Newport, Monmouthshire. She was refloated on 13 September and taken in to Rothesay, Buteshire for repairs.

== 10 September ==
List of shipwrecks: 10 September 1859
Ship	State	Description
Carl von Linne	(Russian Empire) Grand Duchy of Finland	The ship ran aground on the Noriskar Reef, in the Baltic Sea. She was on a voyage from Hull, Yorkshire to Vaasa.
Margaret	Norway	The ship was abandoned in the North Sea 6 nautical miles (11 km) off Hanstholm, Denmark. Her crew were rescued by Josephine Gogstad (Norway). Margaret was on a voyage from Barcelona, Spain to Porsgrund.
Mastiff	United States	The clipper was destroyed by fire in the Pacific Ocean. She was on a voyage from San Francisco, California to Hong Kong.
Sportsman	United Kingdom	The schooner foundered in the North Sea. Her crew were rescued by the schooner Cygnet (United Kingdom). Sportsman was on a voyage from the River Wear to Aberdeen.

== 11 September ==
List of shipwrecks: 11 September 1859
Ship	State	Description
Celestial	United Kingdom	The schooner was driven ashore and severely damaged in a typhoon at Swatow, China.
Chin Chin	United Kingdom	The barque was damaged in a typhoon at Swatow.
Cid	Hamburg	The barque was damaged in a typhoon at Swatow.
Confucius	United Kingdom	The ship was driven into Victoria (United Kingdom) in a typhoon at Hong Kong and sank.
Dr. Jaris Jantsen	Netherlands	The ship was driven ashore in a typhoon at Hong Kong.
Hazard	United Kingdom	The schooner was driven ashore in a typhoon at Swatow.
Hendrika Jantina	Netherlands	The koff sprang a leak and foundered off Salcombe, Devon, United Kingdom. Her crew were rescued. She was on a voyage from Málaga, Spain to the River Clyde.
India	Sweden	The barque was damaged in a typhoon at Swatow.
Kenilworth	United Kingdom	The full-rigged ship was wrecked in a typhoon at Hong Kong.
Luna	United Kingdom	The full-rigged ship was wrecked in a typhoon at Hong Kong.
Lucifer	United Kingdom	The ship was wrecked on the Nirro, in the Baltic Sea. She was on a voyage from Vyborg, Grand Duchy of Finland to Liverpool, Lancashire.
Melbourne	United Kingdom	The ship was driven ashore in a typhoon at Hong Kong.
Moultan	United Kingdom	The barque was driven ashore in a typhoon at Swatow.
Napoleon	Chile	The barque was driven ashore in a typhoon at Swatow.
New York	United Kingdom	The barque was damaged in a typhoon at Swatow.
Orestes	United Kingdom	The barque was damaged in a typhoon at Swatow.
Podesta	United Kingdom	The ship was reported missing following a typhoon at Hong Kong.
Sea	United Kingdom	The brig sprang a leak and foundered at a position variously reported as 17 nautical miles (31 km) south of the Old Head of Kinsale, County Cork or 141 nautical miles (261 km) north by west of Cape Finisterre, Spain (44°45′00″N 11°01′30″W). Her crew were rescued by Llewellyn (United Kingdom). Sea was on a voyage from Queenstown, County Cork to "Kustinga".
Shantung	China	The barque was driven ashore and wrecked in a typhoon 4 nautical miles (7.4 km) downstream of Swatow.
Victoria	United Kingdom	The ship was sunk in a typhoon at Hong Kong.
Victoria	Peru	The ship was driven ashore in a typhoon at Swatow.
Whirlwind	United States	The ship was damaged in a typhoon at Hong Kong.
Wide Awake	United Kingdom	The full-rigged ship was wrecked in a typhoon 4 nautical miles (7.4 km) downstream of Swatow.
Wild Wave	United Kingdom	The schooner was driven ashore in a typhoon at Swatow.

== 12 September ==
List of shipwrecks: 12 September 1859
Ship	State	Description
Emma	United Kingdom	The schooner ran aground on the Warden Ledge, off the Isle of Wight and was abandoned. She was on a voyage from the River Tyne to Livorno, Grand Duchy of Tuscany.
Hector	United Kingdom	The schooner was driven ashore in Swanage Bay.
Treasure	United Kingdom	The ship put in to Belfast, County Antrim is a severely sagged condition. She was on a voyage from Arklow, County Wicklow to Sunderland, County Durham.

== 13 September ==
List of shipwrecks: 13 September 1859
Ship	State	Description
Belle	United Kingdom	The barque capsized in the Atlantic Ocean (47°28′N 30°48′W) and was abandoned. Her crew were rescued by the schooner Eclipta (United Kingdom). Belle was on a voyage from Quebec City, Province of Canada, British North America to Padstow, Cornwall.
Commerce	United Kingdom	The brig was driven ashore and wrecked at Glen Head, County Donegal. Her crew were rescued. She was on a voyage from Newcastle upon Tyne, Northumberland to Limerick.
Emanuel	Kingdom of Hanover	The ship was wrecked at Fjaltring, Denmark. Her crew were rescued. She was on a voyage from "Norwarp" to Hanover.
Friends	United Kingdom	The brigantine departed from Cardiff, Glamorgan for Pembroke Dockyard. No further trace, believed foundered off Caldy Island, Pembrokeshire with the loss of all hands.
Governor Brown	United Kingdom	The ship was dismasted in the Atlantic Ocean. She was abandoned on 16 September. Her crew were rescued by Birmingham. Governor Brown was on a voyage from Newcastle upon Tyne, Northumberland to Newhaven, Connecticut, United States.
Helen	United Kingdom	The ship was abandoned in the Atlantic Ocean. She was on a voyage from Quebec City to Liverpool, Lancashire.
Ocean Wave	United States	The ship ran aground on the Man of War Shoal. She was on a voyage from Livorno, Grand Duchy of Tuscany to Baltimore, Maryland.

== 14 September ==
List of shipwrecks: 14 September 1859
Ship	State	Description
Albion	United Kingdom	The brig was driven ashore north of Whitby, Yorkshire. She was refloated and taken in to Scarborough.
Dove	United Kingdom	The schooner was driven ashore and wrecked at Shakespeare Cliff, Dover, Kent. Her crew were rescued by the Coast Guard. Dove was on a voyage from Blyth, Northumberland to Harfleur, Seine-Inférieure, France.
Luna	United Kingdom	The brig ran aground off the Mumbles, Glamorgan. She was refloated and put in to Swansea, Glamorgan in a waterlogged condition.
Pet	United Kingdom	The ship foundered off Bardsey Island, Pembrokeshire. She was on a voyage from Liverpool, Lancashire to Barmouth, Caernarfonshire.
Union	(United Kingdom of Great Britain and Ireland) British North America	The schooner was driven ashore at Cape Cove, Newfoundland and sank. She was on a voyage from Boston, Massachusetts, United States to Weymouth, Nova Scotia.
Westmoreland	United Kingdom	The ship ran aground and was severely damaged at Hartlepool, County Durham.

== 15 September ==
List of shipwrecks: 15 September 1859
Ship	State	Description
Mastiff	United States	The clipper was destroyed by fire in the Pacific Ocean. All 208 people on board were rescued by the full-rigged ship Achilles (United States). Mastiff was on a voyage from San Francisco, California to Hong Kong.
Ostrich	(United Kingdom of Great Britain and Ireland) British North America	The schooner was wrecked at "Fox, Newfoundland". Her crew were rescued.
Princess	United Kingdom	The schooner was abandoned in the Atlantic Ocean and sank with the loss of one life. Survivors were rescued by Queen of the Fleet (United Kingdom). Princess was on a voyage from Sydney, Nova Scotia, British North America to Boston, Massachusetts, United States.
Rhoda	United Kingdom	The schooner sprang a leak and sank 15 nautical miles (28 km) off Sardinia. Her six crew were rescued by Cornelia (Kingdom of Hanover). Rhoda was on a voyage from Brăila and Constantinople, Ottoman Empire to Cork.

== 16 September ==
List of shipwrecks: 16 September 1859
Ship	State	Description
Mansfield	United Kingdom	The schooner sprang a leak, ran aground and was severely damaged at Peterhead, Aberdeenshire. She was on a voyage from Aberdeen to Trondheim, Norway. She was refloated and taken in to Peterhead in a waterlogged condition.
Rome	United Kingdom	The ship was destroyed by fire at Saint Thomas, Virgin Islands.

== 17 September ==
List of shipwrecks: 17 September 1859
Ship	State	Description
Amelia	(United Kingdom of Great Britain and Ireland) Jersey	The ship was driven ashore at Cleethorpes, Lincolnshire.
Benjamin Heape	United Kingdom	The barque ran aground off Port Malcolm, South Australia. She was on a voyage from Melbourne, Victoria to Adelaide, South Australia.
Eagle	United Kingdom	The schooner was driven ashore and wrecked north of Bridlington, Yorkshire. Her six crew were rescued by the Bridlington Lifeboat. She was on a voyage from Sunderland, County Durham to Boulogne-sur-Mer, Pas-de-Calais, France.
Golden Gate	United States	The schooner capsized in the Atlantic Ocean with the loss of four of her seven crews. Survivors were rescued on 2 October by Isabella Maria (United Kingdom). Golden Gate was on a voyage from Philadelphia, Pennsylvania to Pernambuco, Brazil.
Lucinde	Prussia	The brig was wrecked off Minsmere, Suffolk, United Kingdom with the loss of a crew member. Eleven survivors were rescued by the Southwold Lifeboat ( Royal National Lifeboat Institution). Lucinde was on a voyage from Memel to Rochester, Kent, United Kingdom.
Rome	United States	The ship was damaged by fire at Saint Thomas, Virgin Islands. She was on a voyage from Liverpool, Lancashire, United Kingdom to Saint Thomas.

== 18 September ==
List of shipwrecks: 18 September 1859
Ship	State	Description
Catherine Hodges	United Kingdom	The ship driven ashore and wrecked at Dunnet Head, Caithness with the loss of two of her crew. She was on a voyage from Runcorn, Cheshire to Charleston, South Carolina, United States.
Haidee	United Kingdom	The brig was driven ashore on Schouwen, Zeeland, Netherlands. She was on a voyage from Newcastle upon Tyne, Northumberland to Rotterdam, South Holland, Netherlands. Haidee was refloated on 20 September and towed in to Brouwershaven, Zeeland., where she was beached, being severely leaky.
Hendrika	Kingdom of Hanover	The ship ran ashore on Baltrum and was wrecked. Her crew were rescued. She was on a voyage from the Ems to Geestemünde.

== 19 September ==
List of shipwrecks: 19 September 1859
Ship	State	Description
Lily	United Kingdom	The barque ran aground in the Danube downstream of Sfântu Gheorghe, Ottoman Empire. She was on a voyage from South Shields, County Durham to Sulina, Ottoman Empire. She had been refloated by 9 October and taken in to Sulina for repairs.
Queen of the Pacific	United States	The medium clipper was wrecked on a reef 180 nautical miles (330 km) north of Pernambuco, Brazil. She was on a voyage from New York to San Francisco, California.
Rügen	Prussia	The paddle steamer ran aground and was severely damaged at Swinemünde.
Swantje	Netherlands	The schooner was abandoned in the Atlantic Ocean. Her crew were rescued by Anna (United Kingdom). Swantje was on a voyage from Agrigento, Sicily to Hamburg.

== 20 September ==
List of shipwrecks: 20 September 1859
Ship	State	Description
Express	United Kingdom	The South Western Steam Company mail ship struck the Grunes Houilleres Rocks off La Corbière, Jersey, Channel Islands and was run ashore with the loss of two lives. She was on a voyage from Saint Helier, Jersey to Guernsey, Channel Islands and Weymouth, Dorset. Her crew and survivors of about 200 passengers were rescued, some of them by the cutter Napier ( (United Kingdom of Great Britain and Ireland) Jersey)
Nautilus	United Kingdom	The sloop foundered in the English Channel off La Heve, Seine-Inférieure, France. Her crew were rescued. She was on a voyage from Rouen, Seine-Inférieure to Runcorn, Cheshire.

== 21 September ==
List of shipwrecks: 21 September 1859
Ship	State	Description
Ebenezer	United Kingdom	The ship was driven ashore at Goatness, Lothian. She was on a voyage from Sunderland, County Durham to Leith, Lothian. She was refloated and taken in to Dunbar, Lothian.
Marion	United Kingdom	The brig sank off Bornholm, Denmark. She was on a voyage from Sunderland to Kronstadt, Russia.
Marys	United Kingdom	The brig sank in the North Sea. Her crew were rescued by Bertha (United Kingdom). Marys was on a voyage from South Shields, County Durham to Saint Petersburg, Russia.
Ophelia	United Kingdom	The brig ran aground at Flamborough Head, Yorkshire. She was on a voyage from Bridlington, Yorkshire to South Shields, County Durham. She was refloated and resumed her voyage in a leaky condition.

== 22 September ==
List of shipwrecks: 22 September 1859
Ship	State	Description
Ann	United Kingdom	The brig was driven ashore and wrecked at Hook of Holland, South Holland, Netherlands with the loss of all seven crew. She was on a voyage from Newcastle upon Tyne, Northumberland to Rotterdam, South Holland.
Anna Catherina	Hamburg	The galiot collided with another vessel in the North Sea 120 nautical miles (220 km) off Flamborough Head, Yorkshire, United Kingdom. Her crew were taken off the wreck the next day by Waters (United Kingdom). Anna Catherina was on a voyage from Hartlepool, County Durham, United Kingdom to Hamburg.
Archduke	United Kingdom	The ship was abandoned in the North Sea and foundered off the Dutch coast. Her crew were rescued.
Enterprise	United Kingdom	The schooner was abandoned in the North Sea off Flamborough Head. She was on a voyage from Southwold, Suffolk to West Hartlepool, County Durham. She was taken in to Scarborough, Yorkshire in a derelict condition the next day.
Fenna Catherina	Kingdom of Hanover	The ship foundered. Her crew were rescued by Sir Robert Peel (United Kingdom).
Hellespont	France	The paddle steamer struck a sunken rock and sank off Naples, Kingdom of the Two Sicilies. All on board were rescued. She was on a voyage from Naples to Marseille, Bouches-du-Rhône.
Italian	United Kingdom	The steamship ran aground on a reef north east of Namoa, China. All on board were rescued by the steamship Manilla (Flag unknown).
James Dixon	United Kingdom	The steamship was driven ashore at South Shields, County Durham. She was refloated and resumed her voyage.
Lebanon	United Kingdom	The brig foundered 35 nautical miles (65 km) off Alicante, Spain. Her crew were rescued by the barque Stentor (United Kingdom). Lebanon was on a voyage from Sulina, Ottoman Empire to Liverpool, Lancashire.
Monkey	United Kingdom	The tug collided with Firefly (United Kingdom) and sank in the River Avon. Her crew were rescued.
Northern Eagle	United States	The ship was destroyed by fire at Esquimault Harbour, British Columbia, British North America.
S Giovanni	Papal States	The brigantine was wrecked at Rimini. Her crew were rescued.

== 23 September ==
List of shipwrecks: 23 September 1859
Ship	State	Description
Sané	French Navy	The paddle frigate was wrecked on the Chaussée du Sein. Her crew survived. She was on a voyage from Toulon, Var to Brest, Finistère. mc
Sapphire	United Kingdom	The full-rigged ship was wrecked in the Sir Charles Hardy Islands, Queensland. All on board survived. She was on a voyage from Sydney, New South Wales to Calcutta, India.
Victoria	United Kingdom	The paddle steamer foundered off Anholt, Denmark. Her crew were rescued.

== 24 September ==
List of shipwrecks: 24 September 1859
Ship	State	Description
Beatrice	United Kingdom	The barque was abandoned in the Atlantic Ocean. Her crew were rescued by the brig Laboreaux (France).
Conservative	(United Kingdom of Great Britain and Ireland) British Guiana	The schooner collided with the steamship Admiral van Ryk (Netherlands) and sank off Berbice with the loss of a crew member.
Forest Monarch	United Kingdom	The ship was wrecked. She was on a voyage from San Francisco, California, United States to Puget Sound.
Heinrich and Edouard	Hamburg	The schooner caught fire in the Atlantic Ocean and was abandoned. Her crew were rescued by Medora (United Kingdom). Heinrich and Edouard was on a voyage from Hamburg to the Rio Grande.
Wide Awake	United Kingdom	The ship was wrecked near Lemvig, Denmark.

== 25 September ==
List of shipwrecks: 25 September 1859
Ship	State	Description
Christiania	United Kingdom	The ship foundered in the Atlantic Ocean. Her crew were rescued by Nancy (United Kingdom). She was on a voyage from dublin to Miramichi, New Brunswick, British North America.
Hebe	Sweden	The ship was driven ashore on the west coast of Gotland. She was on a voyage from the East Indies to Stockholm.
New Rambler	United Kingdom	The ship was driven ashore south of Fredrikshavn, Denmark. She was on a voyage from Stettin to Leith, Lothian. She was refloated the next day and taken in to Fredrikshavn in a severely leaky condition.
Rambler	United Kingdom	The ship was abandoned in the Atlantic Ocean. Her crew were rescued by Montreal (United Kingdom). Rambler was on a voyage from Miramichi, New Brunswick, British North America to Sunderland, County Durham.

== 26 September ==
List of shipwrecks: 26 September 1859
Ship	State	Description
Britannia	United Kingdom	The schooner ran aground in Kyle Rhea. She was refloated but was consequently beached at Kyleakin, Isle of Skye, Outer Hebrides.
Olaf	Norway	The ship was driven ashore on Skagen, Denmark. She was on a voyage from Newcastle upon Tyne, Northumberland, United Kingdom to Saint Petersburg, Russia. She was refloated and taken in to Kristiansand.
Palmyra	United Kingdom	The ship was wrecked at Lambayeque, Peru. All on board were rescued. She was on a voyage from Sydney, New South Wales to Callao, Peru.
Sascha	United Kingdom	The ship was wrecked on the Little Tytters, in the Baltic Sea. . She was on a voyage from South Shields, County Durham to Saint Petersburg.
Scandia	Sweden	The ship was driven ashore near "San Stefano", Ottoman Empire. She was on a voyage from Brăila, Ottoman Empire to an English port.

== 27 September ==
List of shipwrecks: 27 September 1859
Ship	State	Description
Disco	Norway or Sweden	The barque was driven ashore 3 nautical miles (5.6 km) from Ringkøbing, Denmark. All on board were rescued. She was on a voyage from Nordmaling or Umeå, Sweden to London, United Kingdom.
Empire	United States	The ship collided with Marcellus (United States) and sank in The Narrows. She was on a voyage from Boston, Massachusetts to Bristol, Rhode Island. She was later refloated and towed in to Boston.
Nova Scotian	(United Kingdom of Great Britain and Ireland) British North America	The steamship was reported to have run aground in the Saint Lawrence River upstream of Trois-Rivières, Province of Canada. She was on a voyage from Montreal to Quebec City. She was reported to have been refloated two days later and taken in to Quebec City. The report was denied by her owners, the Montreal Screw Steamship Company.
Panola	United Kingdom	The ship sprang a leak and was abandoned in the Atlantic Ocean. Her crew were rescued by Clemanthe (United Kingdom). Panola was on a voyage from Bombay, India to London.
Waterlily	United Kingdom	The ship foundered in the Bristol Channel between Nash Point, Glamorgan and Ilfracombe, Devon. Her crew were rescued.

== 28 September ==
List of shipwrecks: 28 September 1859
Ship	State	Description
Admiral Boxer	United Kingdom	The ship was wrecked 14 nautical miles (26 km) from Kurrachee, India. All on board were rescued. She was on a voyage from Cardiff, Glamorgan to Kurrachee.
Circe	France	The ship ran aground on the Marquesas Shoals. She was on a voyage from Mobile, Alabama, United States to Cherbourg, Seine-Inférieure. She was refloated and taken in the Key West, Florida, United States where she was condemned.
Friends	United Kingdom	The ketch foundered on the Helwick Shoal in the Bristol Channel with the loss of all six crew.
Grace Darling	United Kingdom	The schooner was run ashore and wrecked at Kilinore, County Wexford. Her crew were rescued. She was on a voyage from Liverpool, Lancashire to Waterford.
New Darlington	United Kingdom	The brig collided with the barque Pantaloon (United Kingdom) and sank in the North Sea 1.5 nautical miles (2.8 km) south of the Mouse Lightship ( Trinity House). Her crew were rescued. She was on a voyage from Seaham, County Durham to London.
Turk	United Kingdom	The ship sank at Calais. Her crew were rescued. She was on a voyage from Antwerp, Belgium to London.

== 29 September ==
List of shipwrecks: 29 September 1859
Ship	State	Description
Army	United Kingdom	The ship departed from Barcelona, Spain for Swansea, Glamorgan. She subsequently foundered; wreckage from the ship washed up at Hartland Point, Devon on 10 November.
Fero	(United Kingdom of Great Britain and Ireland) British North America	The brig was abandoned in the Atlantic Ocean. Her crew were rescued by the barque Aurelia (United States). Fero was on a voyage from Richibucto, New Brunswick to West Hartlepool, County Durham.
John	United Kingdom	The smack was driven ashore near Dartmouth, Devon. She was refloated on 8 October and taken in to Dartmouth.

== 30 September ==
List of shipwrecks: 30 September 1859
Ship	State	Description
Arrow	United Kingdom	The ship ran aground on the Droogden, in the Baltic Sea. She was on a voyage from Newcastle upon Tyne, Northumberland to Kronstadt, Russia. She had been refloated by 12 October and taken in to Copenhagen, Denmark in a leaky condition.
Cumberland	United Kingdom	The ship was driven ashore and wrecked at Sandhammaren, Sweden. Her crew were rescued. She was on a voyage from Memel, Prussia to London.
Flor de Mar	Portugal	The schooner foundered in the Strait of Dover. Her crew were rescued by Destin (France).
Louise Frederike	Hamburg	The brig ran aground off Aux Cayes, Haiti. She was on a voyage from Saint Thomas, Virgin Islands to "Aguin". She was refloated on 3 October and resumed her voyage.

== Unknown date ==
List of shipwrecks: Unknown date in September 1859
Ship	State	Description
Achsah	United Kingdom	The ship was abandoned in the North Sea before 22 September. Her crew were rescued by Newa (Russia). Achsah subsequently foundered. She was on a voyage from Hartlepool, County Durham to Kronstadt, Russia.
Ark	(United Kingdom of Great Britain and Ireland) British North America	The ship ran aground on the Anegada Reef, off Bermuda. She was refloated on 20 September and taken in to Tortola in a leaky condition.
Better Luck	United Kingdom	The schooner ran aground in the Hilbre Islands, Cheshire before 22 September.
Canning	United Kingdom	The ship foundered with the loss of twelve lives.
Charity	United Kingdom	The lighter was wrecked on Hiiumaa, Russia. Her crew were rescued. She was on a voyage from Newcastle upon Tyne, Northumberland to Saint Petersburg, Russia.
Chinchurrah Eastaway	United Kingdom	The full-rigged ship was wrecked on the Gaspar Sands. She was on a voyage from London to Calcutta, India.
Cornhill	United Kingdom	The ship ran aground on the Middlegrund, in the Baltic Sea. She was on a voyage from Saint Petersburg to London. She was refloated and resumed her voyage, but later collided with a schooner and was damaged. She put in to Helsingør, Denmark on 30 September in a leaky condition.
Cromwell	United Kingdom	The ship was driven ashore at Singapore, Straits Settlements.
Emerald	France	The ship foundered in the Bristol Channel before 4 September. She was on a voyage from Rouen, Seine-Inférieure to the Clyde.
USS Fulton	United States Navy	The harbor defense ship was reported to have been wrecked on Santa Rosa Island, Florida.
Fury	United Kingdom	The tug suffered a boiler explosion and sank off the mouth of the River Avon with the loss of three of her four crew.
General Parkhill	United Kingdom	The ship was driven ashore on Sullivan's Island, South Carolina, United States. She was on a voyage from Liverpool to Charleston, South Carolina. She was later refloated and completed her voyage.
Heden	United Kingdom	The ship was abandoned in the Atlantic Ocean before 25 September.
Hoffnung	Kingdom of Hanover	The brig foundered in the North Sea. Her crew were rescued. She was on a voyage from Newcastle upon Tyne to Bremen.
Isaac H Boardman	United Kingdom	The ship caught fire at Aden and was scuttled. She was later refloated.
Jan Zylker	Netherlands	The galiot ran aground off Sestos, Ottoman Empire with the loss of a crew member. She had been refloated by 27 September.
Jernbarden	Norway	The schooner foundered in the North Sea before 29 September. Her crew were rescued by Augusta (United Kingdom). Jernbarden was on a voyage from an English port to Brevig.
John Bull	United Kingdom	The ship was driven ashore near "Toukow". She was on a voyage from London to Vaasa, Grand Duchy of Finland. She was refloated and taken in to Helsingør, Denmark, where she arrived on 30 September in a leaky condition.
Kate and Jane	United Kingdom	The ship was driven ashore at Dartmouth, Devon. She was refloated on 27 September.
Louis Alma Inkermann	(United Kingdom of Great Britain and Ireland) British North America	The schooner was wrecked near Sept-Îles, Province of Canada.
Margaret	United Kingdom	The ship was wrecked on the coast of Africa. She was on a voyage from London to Suez, Egypt.
Ocean	Sweden	The schooner foundered off Isla de Lobos, Uruguay. She was on a voyage from Glasgow, Renfrewshire, United Kingdom to Montevideo, Uruguay.
Ocean Express	United States	The clipper ran aground in the Golden Gate. She was refloated.
Rachel	United Kingdom	The ship was driven ashore and wrecked in the Hudson River before 28 September. She was on a voyage from Liverpool, Lancashire to New York, United States.
Rattler	United Kingdom	The barque was abandoned in the Atlantic Ocean between 8 and 20 September. Her crew were rescued by Jessy (United Kingdom). Rattler was on a voyage from Quebec City to London.
Sphynx	United Kingdom	The barque was abandoned in the Atlantic Ocean before 11 September.
Thomas Brassey	United Kingdom	The ship was abandoned off the Cape of Good Hope, Cape Colony. She was on a voyage from Bombay, India to Liverpool, Lancashire.
Uruguay	France	The barque ran aground on the Florida Reefs, in the Atlantic Ocean. She was on a voyage from Havana, Cuba to Havre de Grâce, Seine-Inférieure. She was refloated and put in to Norfolk, Virginia, United States, where she arrived on 21 September in a severely leaky condition.
Vedra	Russia	The steamship was driven ashore on "Demunstein" before 23 September. She was on a voyage from Kronstadt to Narva. She was consequently condemned.
Zembarden Christensen	Norway	The schooner foundered in the North Sea. Her crew were rescued by the schooner Augusta (Sweden). Zembarden Christensen was on a voyage from an English port to Lemvig.
