= Arcturus (steamship) =

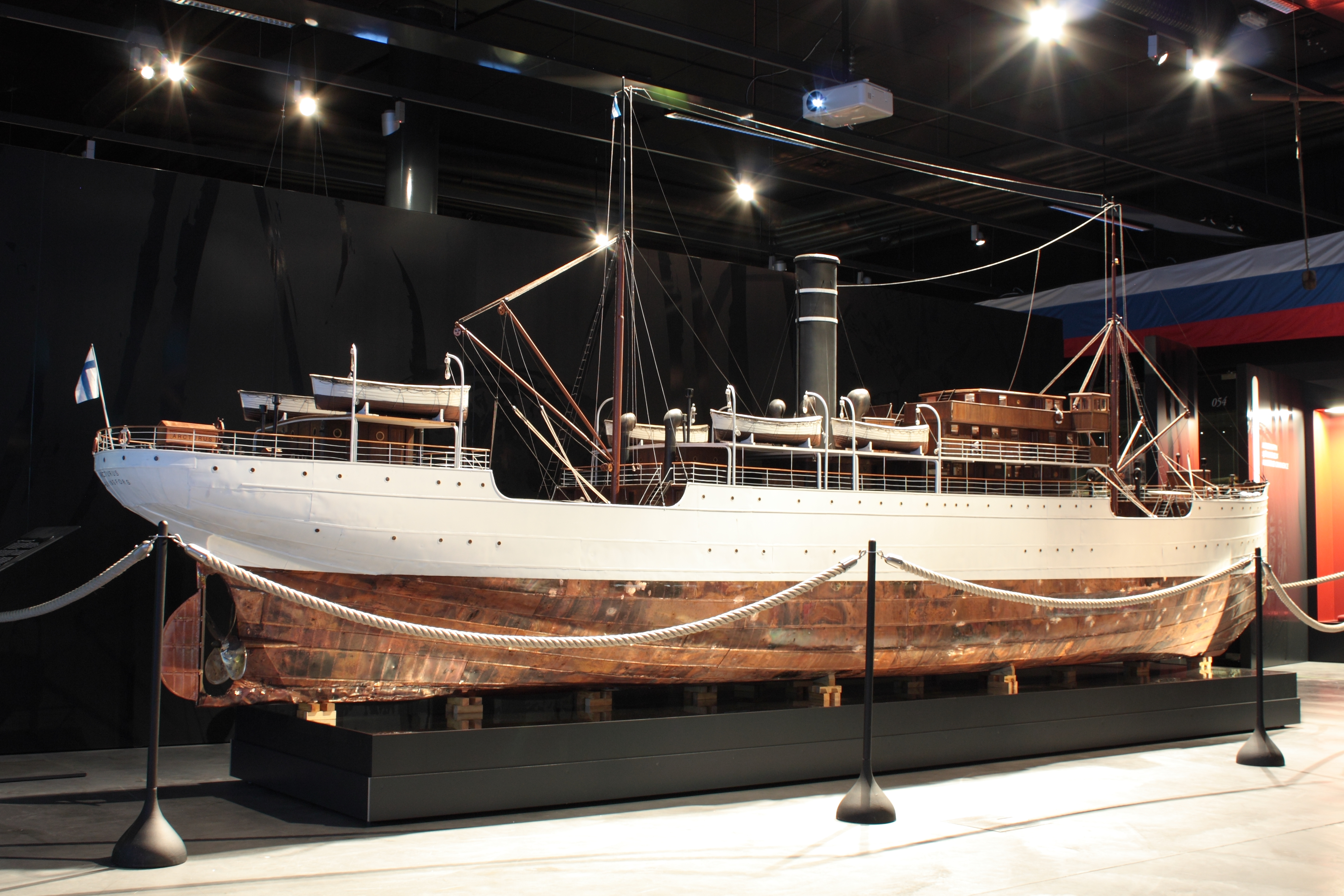
- A scale model by Tomi Isopahkala in Maritime Museum of Finland

History

Finland
- Name: Arcturus
- Owner: Finland Steamship Company
- Port of registry: Helsinki, Finland
- Route: Finland-Copenhagen-Hull, England
- Builder: Gourlay Brothers, Dundee, Scotland
- Cost: FIM 1,317,000
- Yard number: 183
- Launched: 1 October 1898
- Completed: December 1898
- In service: 1898–1957
- Identification: code letters SQMJ (until 1933); call sign OHAF (from 1934)
- Fate: Scrapped

General characteristics
- Type: Passenger ship
- Tonnage: 2,023 GRT; tonnage under deck 1,522; 1,157 NRT; 1,270 DWT (open)
- Length: 88.95 m (292 ft)
- Beam: 11.57 m (38 ft)
- Draught: 6.35 m (21 ft)
- Depth: 4.2 m (13.7 ft)
- Installed power: 3,250 ihp; 551 NHP
- Propulsion: triple-expansion steam engine; single screw
- Speed: 13.5 knots (25 km/h)
- Sensors & processing systems: wireless direction finding (from 1931)

SS Arcturus was a passenger ship of the Finland Steamship Company operating primarily on the route between Hanko, Finland and Hull, England via Copenhagen, Denmark. Gourlay Brothers of Dundee, Scotland built Arcturus, launching her on 1 October 1898 and completing her that December.

In its earlier years Arcturus was one of the primary ships that Finnish emigrants sailed on when heading to North America. After disembarking at Hull, emigrants would typically take a train to Liverpool to board a transatlantic liner.

On 12 December 1930 in fog in the Kattegat Arcturus collided with another Finnish Steamship Company ship, Oberon. Oberon sank in only three minutes, with the loss of 41 of her passengers and crew.

Arcturus remained in service until 1956.
