= SS Batavier V (1902) =

Dutch steam packet

- SS Batavier V

History
- Name: SS Batavier V
- Owner: William Müller & Co.
- Operator: Batavier Line
- Port of registry: (Netherlands) Rotterdam
- Route: Rotterdam–London
- Builder: Gourlay Brothers, Dundee, Scotland
- Yard number: 205
- Launched: 28 November 1902
- Completed: February 1903
- Captured: seized as prize by U-28, 18 March 1915, but later released
- Fate: mined and sunk, 16 May 1916

General characteristics
- Type: steam packet
- Tonnage: 1,562 GRT
- Length: 79.3 m (260 ft 2 in) (lpp)
- Beam: 10.7 m (35 ft 1 in)
- Propulsion: 1 × 3-cylinder, triple-expansion steam engine, 2,300 ihp (1,700 kW)
- Speed: 14.5 knots (26.9 km/h)
- Capacity: passengers: 75 first class; 28 second-class; 325 steerage

SS Batavier V was a steam packet for the Batavier Line that sailed between Rotterdam and London for most of her career. The ship was built in 1897 by the Gourlay Brothers of Dundee. The Dutch ship could carry a limited amount of freight and up to 428 passengers. She was rebuilt in 1909 which increased her length by over 5 metres (16 ft).

During World War I, the Batavier Line attempted to maintain service, but in March 1915, Batavier V was seized as a prize by German submarine U-28 and sailed into Zeebrugge in German-occupied Belgium. The ship was released by a German prize court in September. In May 1916, Batavier V struck a mine laid by German submarine UC-6 off the British coast and sank with the loss of four lives.

== Career ==
Batavier V and sister ship Batavier IV were built for William Müller and Company by the Gourlay Brothers of Dundee, Scotland. The ship was launched on 28 November 1902. She was 79.3 metres (260 ft 2 in) long (between perpendiculars) and 10.7 metres (35 ft 1 in) abeam. Batavier V was powered by a single 3-cylinder, triple-expansion steam engine of 2,300 indicated horsepower (1,700 kW) that moved her at a speed of up to 14.5 knots (26.9 km/h). She could carry a maximum of 428 passengers: 75 in first class, 28 in second, and up to 325 in steerage. She was listed at 1,562 gross register tons (GRT).

Upon completion in February 1903, she joined Batavier I, Batavier II, Batavier III, and Batavier IV in packet service between Rotterdam and London. In Rotterdam, the ships docked at the Willemsplein; in London, the ships docked at the Customs House and Wool Quays near the Tower Bridge. The Batavier Line service between Rotterdam and London was offered daily except Sundays, with each ship making multiple round trips per week.

After the outbreak of World War I in August 1914, the Batavier Line continued service on the Rotterdam–London route. Batavier V was frequently stopped by German warships, examined and allowed to proceed. On 17 March 1915, however, Batavier V left Rotterdam and proceeded to Hook of Holland, passing there in the early morning hours of 18 March. At about 05:00, 6 nautical miles (11 km) southwest of the Maas Lightship, German submarine U-28 hailed Batavier V. Kapitänleutnant Georg-Günther von Forstner, U-28's commanding officer, made clear his intent to seize Batavier V and sail it to German-occupied Zeebrugge. While the captains of the two vessels argued the legalities of seizing a vessel flagged under a neutral country, lookouts on the submarine spotted another Dutch steamer, Zaanstroom. U-28 left an officer and a sailor on board Batavier V, and proceeded to stop and similarly seize Zaanstroom. U-28 and a pilot boat, W2, led both of the Dutch ships through minefields and into Zeebrugge.

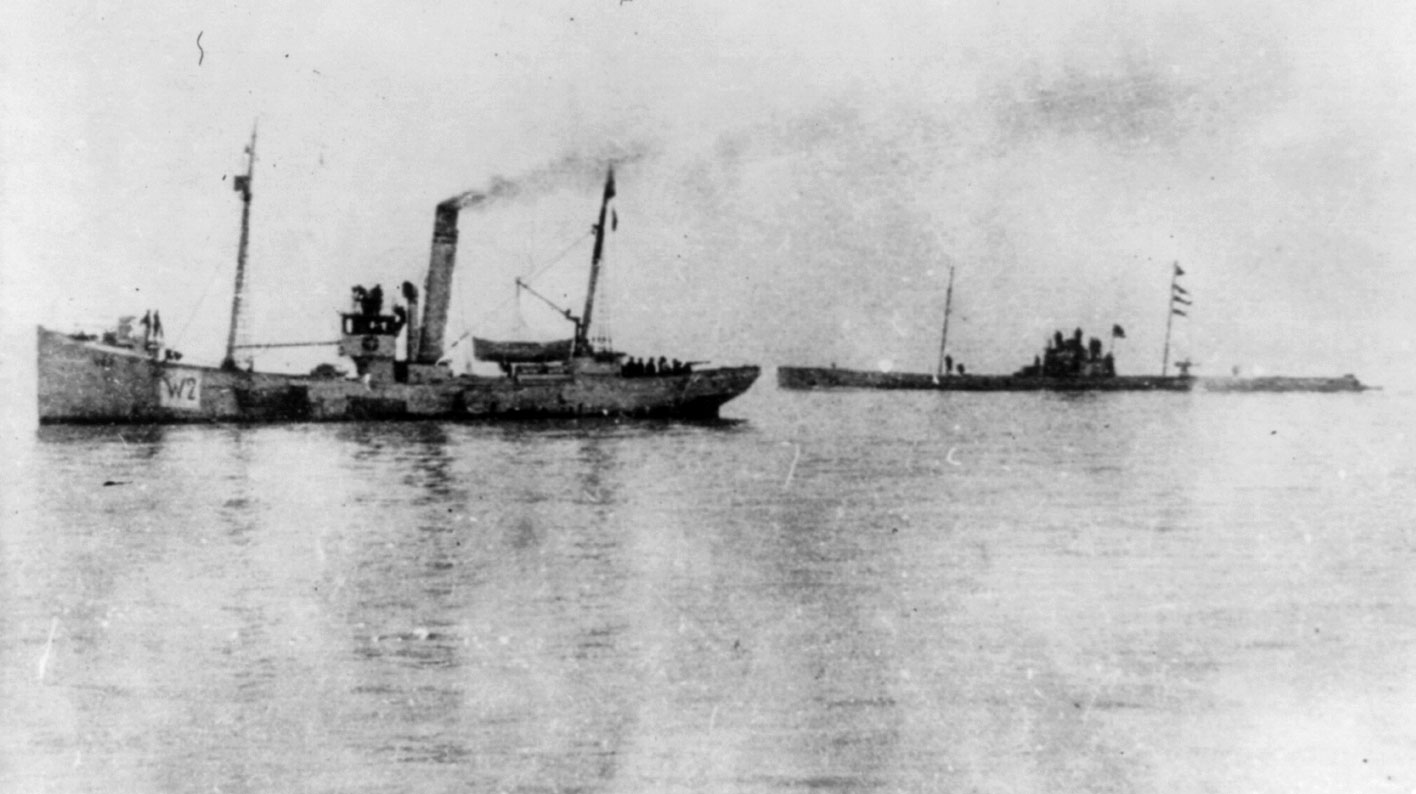
Pilot boat W2 and U-28 as seen from Batavier V when she was captured as a prize in March 1915.

According to Popular Mechanics, one of Batavier V's passengers was a photographer who was able to snap pictures of the ship's encounter with the U-boat. In April, the International News Service copyrighted eight images from the photographer, and deposited them with the Library of Congress. According to Popular Mechanics, which published one of the photos in its July 1915 edition, the photographs give a sense of the "enormous size and power of the latest German submarines". (Note: Some of the Copyright deposits and the Popular Mechanics article identify the submarine as U-36, while some of the copyright deposits and all contemporary news accounts identify the submarine as U-28. While its possible that Batavier V may have been seized twice by two different submarines, it seems more likely that International News Service was responsible for the misidentification.)

At Zeebrugge, Batavier V's Dutch crew, and all the Dutch citizens, women, and children among the ship's passengers were released; fourteen Belgian men of fighting age and two priests were taken prisoner by the Germans. Batavier V's cargo of fresh meat and Zaanstroom's 300 long tons (340 short tons) of fresh eggs were confiscated and unloaded by German personnel. The women and children were fed what one woman called "unpalatable black bread" before being sent to Ghent and on to Terneuzen in the Netherlands. The Dutch government requested explanation from Germany over the seizure of the neutral vessels and their cargoes. Batavier V was released by a German prize court in September.

Batavier V resumed Rotterdam–London passenger service after her release from German control at Zeebrugge. On 16 May 1916, while outbound from London for Rotterdam, Batavier V struck a mine near the north buoy at Inner Gabbard. The mine had been recently planted by the German coastal minelaying submarine UC-6. According to one witness, the ship's decks were awash within three minutes of the explosion, which blew the rear cargo hold hatch and sent a great deal of cargo flying through the air. Batavier V sank within twenty minutes, taking with her three members of the crew and one American passenger.

== Bibliography ==
- Library of Congress, Copyright Office (1915). Catalogue of Copyright Entries for the Year 1915, Part 4. Washington, D.C.: Government Printing Office. OCLC 6467863.
- Reynolds, Francis J.; Allen L. Churchill; Francis Trevelyan Miller (1916). The Story of the Great War: The Complete Historical Record of Events to Date. New York: P.F. Collier and Son. OCLC 2678548.
- van Ysselsteyn, Hendrik Albert (1908). The Port of Rotterdam (3d ed.). Rotterdam: Nijgh & Van Ditmar's Publishing Co. OCLC 60983381.
