= HMS Western Isles =

History

Netherlands
- Name: Batavier IV
- Owner: Wm. H. Müller & Co.
- Operator: Batavier Line
- Route: Rotterdam–London
- Builder: Gourlay Bros & Co., Dundee
- Yard number: 204
- Launched: 17 October 1902
- Fate: Chartered by British Ministry of War Transport, May 1940

United Kingdom
- Name: HMS Eastern Isles (1940–1941); HMS Western Isles (1941–1946)
- Acquired: By charter, May 1940
- Commissioned: September 1940
- Decommissioned: 1946
- Fate: Sold to the Royal Netherlands Navy, 1946

Netherlands
- Name: Hr. Ms. Zeearend (A 892)
- Acquired: By purchase, 1946
- Decommissioned: October 1970
- Stricken: July 1971
- Fate: Sold for scrapping, November 1972

General characteristics (as built)
- Type: Passenger/cargo ship
- Tonnage: 1,568 GRT
- Length: 79.31 m (260 ft 2 in)
- Beam: 10.7 m (35 ft 1 in)
- Draught: 4.39 m (14 ft 5 in)
- Propulsion: 3-cylinder triple expansion engine; 2,300 ihp (1,700 kW)
- Speed: 14.5 knots (26.9 km/h; 16.7 mph)
- Capacity: Passengers: 75 × first-class; 28 × second-class; up to 325 in steerage

HMS Western Isles was a command ship of the Royal Navy during World War II, serving as the flagship of the Anti-Submarine Training School at Tobermory on the Isle of Mull under Vice Admiral Gilbert Stephenson. Launched in 1902 as the Dutch Batavier Line passenger ship Batavier IV, after the war she served in the Royal Netherlands Navy as the training ship Hr. Ms. Zeearend (A 892). She was decommissioned in 1970, and scrapped in 1972.

== Ship history ==
The ship was built by Gourlay Brothers & Co. of Dundee as a passenger/cargo ship for Wm. H. Müller & Company's Batavier Line, and launched as Batavier IV in 1902. Of 1,568 gross register tons (GRT), and with a length of 260 ft (79 m), she was powered by a 3-cylinder triple expansion engine, producing 2,300 ihp (1,700 kW) to give a maximum speed of 14.5 knots (26.9 km/h; 16.7 mph). The ship carried 75 first class and 28 second class passengers, and up to 325 in steerage.

In service on the daily Rotterdam to London route, after the invasion of the Netherlands in May 1940 the ship was chartered by the British Ministry of War Transport and was sent to Guernsey to evacuate children in anticipation of the German occupation of the Channel Islands. In June she was transferred to the Royal Navy, and commissioned in September 1940 as HMS Eastern Isles, being renamed HMS Western Isles in March 1941.

She served as the flagship of Western Approaches Command's Anti-Submarine Training School at Tobermory where from about July 1940 all escort ships intended for Atlantic convoy duty attended before being allowed to deploy. A noted depiction of the establishment and its commander is given (albeit in fictional form) in Nicholas Monsarrat's novel The Cruel Sea. The Training School was closed following the end of World War II in Europe.

In 1946 HMS Western Isles was sold to the Koninklijke Marine ("Royal Netherlands Navy"). She was converted into a submarine warfare training ship and renamed HNLMS Zeearend (A 892). She was finally decommissioned in October 1970, struck from the Navy List in July 1971, and sold for scrapping in November 1972.

== See also ==
- SS Batavier V (1902) (sister ship)
- Ship's cat § Peebles (ship's cat of HMS Western Isles)
