= SS Bonnie Dundee =

Australian steamship, launched 1877

History

New South Wales
- Name: Bonnie Dundee
- Owner: George & Bruce Nicoll
- Port of registry: Sydney
- Builder: Gourlay Brothers and Company, Dundee
- Launched: 2 March 1877
- Identification: Registration number: 41/1877; UK Official Number: 75200
- Fate: Sunk as a result of collision on 10 March 1879, with the loss of 5 lives

General characteristics
- Tonnage: 193/121 gross register tons
- Length: 130.3 feet (39.7 m)
- Beam: 19 feet (6 m)
- Draft: 9.9 feet (3.0 m)
- Propulsion: 40 hp twin cylinder compound steam engine with single coal burning boiler

SS Bonnie Dundee was a 193/121 Gross register tons Australian steamship which sank after a collision with the steamship SS Barrabool off Lake Macquarie, New South Wales, Australia, on 10 March 1879.

== History ==
Bonnie Dundee was built by Gourlay Brothers and Company, Dundee, Scotland, for George and Bruce Nicoll, Sydney, Australia, and was launched on 2 March 1877. Intended for trade from the Richmond River in New South Wales, Australia, she departed Dundee on 28 March 1877, traveling via the Suez Canal and stopping at Ceylon before and arriving in Cooktown, Australia, on Wednesday, 27 June 1877. She put into the Clarence River in New South Wales in mid-July 1877 and arrived in Sydney, New South Wales, on 18 July 1877.

While under charter, captained by John Alexander Stuart, Bonnie Dundee was cut in two in a collision with SS Barrabool, captained by John Readman Clark, which ran into her at about 8:00 p.m. on Monday, 10 March 1879. Bonnie Dundee sank within a few minutes. Five of her passengers did not survive the sinking. Barrabool suffered a gash in her port bow above the waterline.

Bonnie Dundee's wreck is located in 35 metres (115 ft) of water about 5 kilometres (3 mi) off Caves Beach, New South Wales, southeast of Moon Island, at approximately 33°06.327′S 151°42.258′E.
