= Batavier Line =

SS Batavier II in c. 1897–1909

SS Batavier V in c. 1902–1916

The Batavier Line (Dutch: Batavier Lijn) was a packet service between Rotterdam and London from 1830 until the 1960s. The line was established by the Nederlandsche Stoomboot Maatschappij (known as NSM and in English as Netherlands Steamship Company).

== History ==
Having attempted unsuccessfully to establish services between Rotterdam–Hamburg and Antwerp–London, the company turned its attention to Rotterdam–London and became the first regular foreign-owned company to set up such a service into London Port.

The original boat on the service was the wooden paddle steamer De Batavier (built 1829). She was replaced by an iron-hulled paddle steamer named Batavier in 1855, and this ship was replaced by another iron-hulled steamer Batavier in 1872.

In 1895, NSM sold the company to Wm. H. Müller and Co. and a condition of sale was that the Batavier name would be maintained as the company name and the naming scheme for its ships.

Müller ordered two new steel-hulled steamers from Gourlay Brothers of Dundee in 1897, Batavier II and Batavier III. When this pair joined the fleet, the prior Batavier was renamed Batavier I. In Rotterdam, the ships docked at the Willemsplein; in London, the ships originally docked near London Bridge, but in 1899 switched to Custom House and Wool Quays near Tower Bridge (now known as Sugar Quay). Also beginning in 1899, the Batavier Line service between Rotterdam and London was offered daily except Sundays. In 1902 a further pair of ship was ordered from Gourlay, Batavier IV and Batavier V, and when Batavier VI was added in 1903, Batavier I was taken out of service. In 1909 Batavier II and Batavier III were rebuilt to a size more closely aligned with the later ships.

During the early stages of World War I, the line continued service, but the ships were sometime subjected to being stopped by German submarines. In March 1915, Batavier V was stopped and seized as a prize by German submarine U-28, but later released by the German prize court. In May 1916, Batavier V struck a mine off the British coast and was sunk with the loss of four lives. In September, Batavier II was seized by UB-6, but later released; she was sunk in 1917 by the British submarine E55.

In June 1922 the London terminal was changed to "Batavier Pier" in Gravesend.

After World War I ended, new Batavier II and Batavier V were added to the line, but during World War II, the newer Batavier V was seized by German forces and later sunk by a British motor torpedo boat. A newer Batavier III, added in 1939 to replace the 1902 ship of the same name, was also seized by the Germans and later mined. After the end of the war, only the 1921 Batavier II remained in service for the line and continued passenger service until April 1958 ending the 128 year service. Several freighters were added in the late 1950s and a freight service was continued for a time after passenger service ended.

== Ships ==
See list of ships operated below

| Propulsion | Ship | Launched | Tonnage (GRT) | Notes and references |
|---|---|---|---|---|
| PS | De Batavier | 1827 | c.300 | Wooden construction. Tonnage possibly DWAT or DWCC not NRT? |
| PS | Batavier | 1855 | | Iron hulled. |
| SS | Batavier | 1872 ? | ? | Iron hulled. Replaced Batavier (1855). Renamed Batavier I in 1897. |
| SS | Batavier II | 1897 | 1,136 | Built Gourlay Brothers. Lengthened and re-boilered in 1909/1910. War loss, 1916. |
| SS | Batavier III | 1897 | 1,136 | Built Gourlay Brothers. Lengthened and re-boilered 1909/1910. Sold, 1939. |
| SS | Batavier IV | 1903 | 1,568 | Built by Gourlay Brothers. Survived World War II, but did not re-enter service. |
| SS | Batavier V | 1903 | 1,568 | Built by Gourlay Brothers. Mined in 1916 and sunk. |
| SS | Batavier VI | 1903 | 1,181 | Built by Mackie and Thompson, Glasgow. Survived World War I. Sold, 1928. |
| SS | Batavier II | 1921 | 1,573 | Built by Wilton Engineering, Rotterdam. Re-entered service after war and served until passenger service closed in 1958. Scrapped, 1960. |
| SS | Batavier V | 1921 | 1,573 | Built by Wilton Engineering, Rotterdam. Seized by Germany. Sunk by British Royal Navy, 1941. |
| SS | Batavier III | 1939 | 2,687 | Built by Scheepswerf De Noord, Alblasserdam. Seized by Germany in May 1940. Hit mine and sank, 1942. |

== Bibliography ==
- Greenway, Ambrose (1986). A Century of North Sea Passenger Steamers. Shepperton: Ian Allan Ltd. ISBN 0-7110-1338-1.
- van Ysselsteyn, Hendrik Albert (1908). The Port of Rotterdam (3d ed.). Rotterdam: Nijgh & Van Ditmar's Publishing Co. OCLC 60983381.
