= SS Cromer =

Cargo vessel

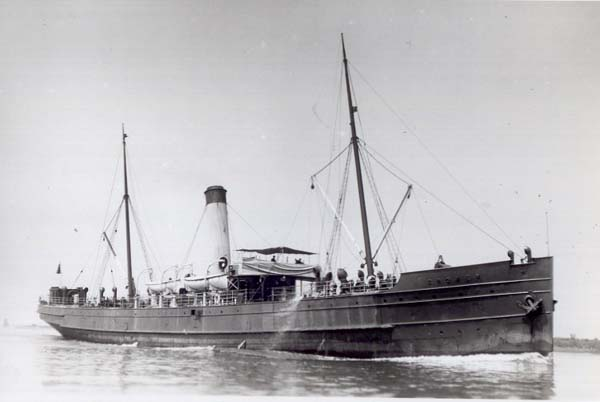

History
- Name: TSS Cromer
- Namesake: Cromer
- Operator: 1902–1923: Great Eastern Railway; 1923–1934: London and North Eastern Railway
- Port of registry: (United Kingdom)
- Builder: Gourlay Brothers, Dundee
- Yard number: 201
- Launched: 22 February 1902
- Out of service: 1934
- Fate: Scrapped 1934

General characteristics
- Tonnage: 812 gross register tons (GRT)
- Length: 245.3 feet (74.8 m)
- Beam: 31.1 feet (9.5 m)
- Depth: 15.3 feet (4.7 m)
- Speed: 13.5 knots

TSS Cromer was a cargo vessel built for the Great Eastern Railway in 1902.

== History ==
The ship was built by Gourlay Brothers of Dundee and launched on 22 February 1902 by Miss A Howard. She made her trial trip on 17 March 1902. She was put to work on the Harwich to Rotterdam route. She could carry 450 tons of cargo and 86 head of cattle.

On 9 July 1909 she was in collision with the Cardiff steamer Southfield, in the waterway from Rotterdam. She sustained only slight damage, whereas the forepart of the Southfield was damaged badly and she started to leak. After returning to her anchorage, the Cromer was able to depart for Harwich later the same evening.

In 1915 she was attacked 15 miles off the Noord Hinder Lightship but the torpedo missed the ship.

In 1916 she picked up from a lifeboat 23 men from the crew of the British steamer Empress of Midland which had been sunk. Later that same year Captain Beeching was presented with a gold watch, and the crew with silver watches to commemorate the sinking by the Cromer of a German submarine in the North Sea some two months previously.

She was taken over by the London and North Eastern Railway in 1923.

She was scrapped in 1934.

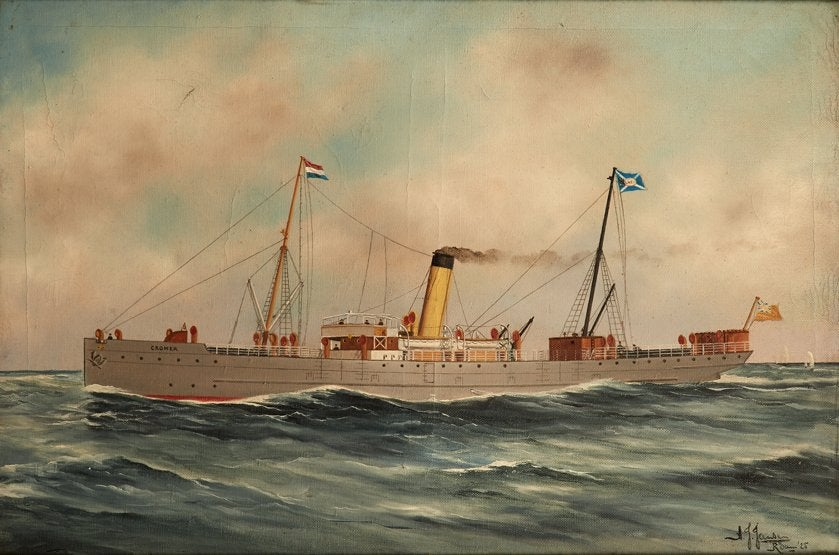
SS Cromer, by A. J. Jansen
