= Gilbert Stephenson =

British naval officer (1878–1972)

Vice-Admiral Sir Gilbert Stephenson KBE CB CMG DL
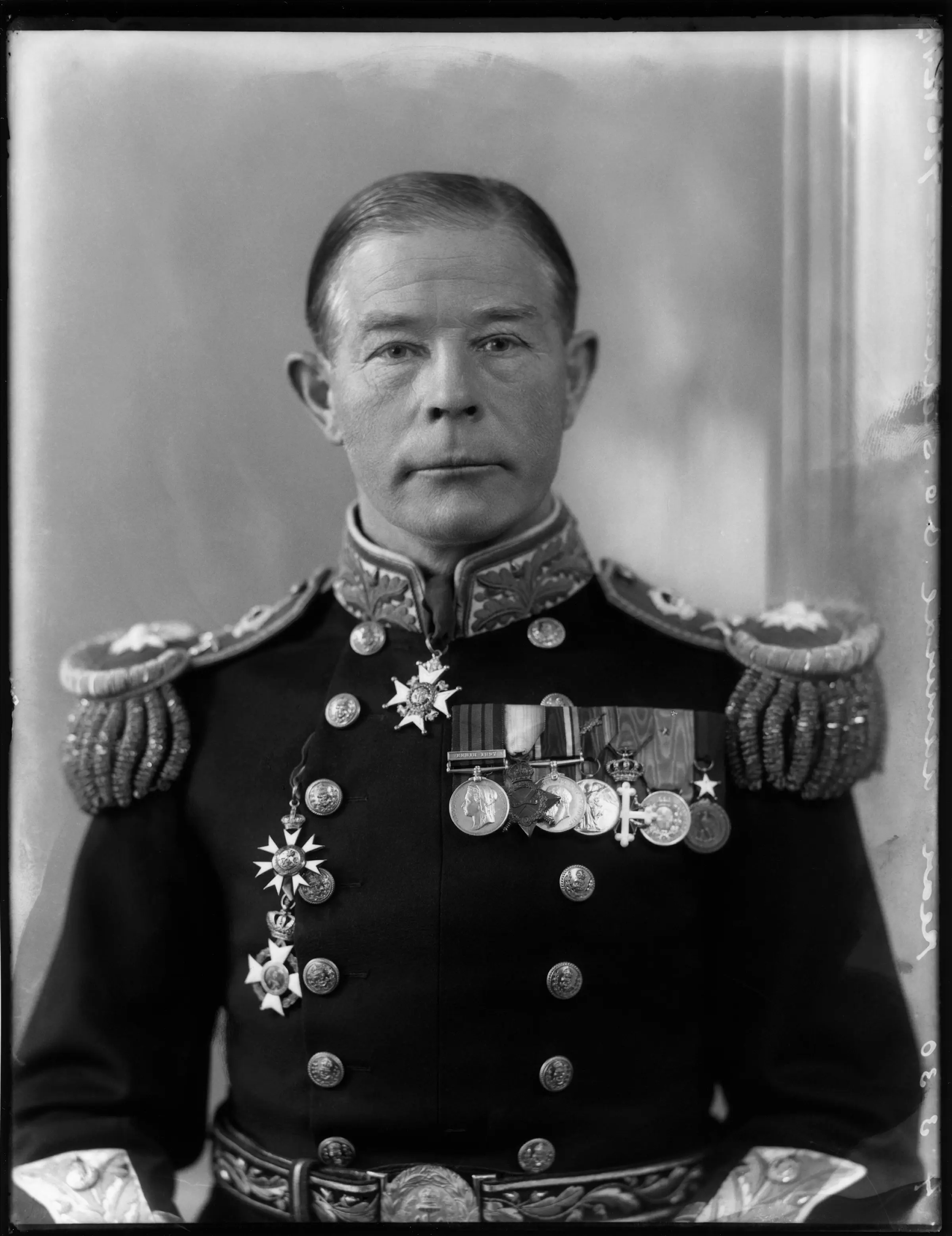
- Stephenson in 1930
- Born: 13 February 1878; London, England
- Died: 27 May 1972 (aged 94); Saffron Walden, England
- Military career
- Allegiance: United Kingdom
- Branch: Royal Navy
- Service years: 1892–1929; 1939–1945
- Rank: Vice-Admiral
- Nicknames: "Monkey Brand", "The Terror of Tobermory", "The Monkey"
- Commands: HMS Western Isles; Portsmouth Naval Barracks; HMS Revenge; HMS Dauntless; Otranto Barrage; HMS Hussar; HMS Scourge; TB 90
- Conflicts: Benin Expedition of 1897; First World War: Gallipoli campaign; Second World War: Dunkirk evacuation; Battle of the Atlantic
- Awards: Knight Commander of the Order of the British Empire; Companion of the Order of the Bath; Companion of the Order of St Michael and St George; Mentioned in Despatches (2); Commander of the Order of the Redeemer (Greece); Officer of the Order of Saints Maurice and Lazarus (Italy); Silver Medal of Military Valor (Italy); Navy Distinguished Service Medal (United States); Commander with Star of the Royal Norwegian Order of St. Olav (Norway)

Vice-Admiral Sir Gilbert Owen Stephenson, KBE, CB, CMG, DL (13 February 1878 – 27 May 1972) was a senior officer in the Royal Navy, a pioneer of anti-submarine techniques in the First World War and a distinguished naval training commandant in the Second World War.

== Early life and career ==
Stephenson was born in London on 13 February 1878. His father was a merchant in the Indian trade. Stephenson joined the Royal Navy aged fourteen in 1892 when he began his training at the Royal Naval College, Dartmouth. As a midshipman he was posted to HMS Endymion and HMS Forte. While with Forte he was involved in the Punitive Expedition of 1897 in Benin. Following promotion to sub-lieutenant on 15 June 1898, he went first to the First Destroyer Flotilla. In February 1900 he was posted to HMS Ramillies, flagship of the Mediterranean Fleet, and served on HMS Ocean for the voyage to Malta. The following year he was given his first command, the torpedo boat, TB 90. He was promoted lieutenant in June 1900.

Stephenson managed to make a favourable impression on Admiral Sir Jackie Fisher, the then Commander-in-Chief, Mediterranean. As a result, Stephenson, aged just 23, was given command of the destroyer, HMS Scourge. He then took the torpedo course at Royal Naval College, Greenwich, and was posted to the staff of HMS Vernon, the Royal Navy's torpedo school. This was followed by appointments as torpedo officer aboard the cruisers HMS Monmouth and HMS Black Prince. After promotion to lieutenant commander, he served as First Lieutenant on the battleship HMS Duncan. He was promoted commander in 1912.

== First World War and first retirement ==
At the outbreak of the First World War in August 1914, Stephenson was based in the Admiralty, attached to the Naval Intelligence Division. However, he soon managed to obtain a seagoing role as executive officer of HMS Canopus. He was involved in operations in the Dardanelles, and then commanded a fleet of naval trawlers undertaking patrols from Crete. He went on to command the gunboat HMS Hussar and, (as an acting captain) the Otranto Barrage, a fleet of small boats which attempted to control the exit from the Adriatic Sea, particularly trying to prevent submarines of the Austro-Hungarian Navy breaking out into the Mediterranean. In this last role, he also undertook early experiments into the use of hydrophones to detect submarines. He was Mentioned in Despatches in December 1918, appointed a Companion of the Order of St Michael and St George in the 1919 New Year Honours, awarded the Greek decoration of Commander of the Order of the Redeemer for his service in the Mediterranean and Adriatic, and was also awarded the United States Navy Distinguished Service Medal.

These experiments led to Stephenson's first post-war role, as director of the anti-submarine division of the Admiralty. He found many of his fellow officers conservative in their approach, and struggled to get new techniques accepted. He left this role in 1921 to command the cruiser HMS Dauntless, and then in 1923 the battleship HMS Revenge, where he had the young Louis Mountbatten as one of his junior officers.

Stephenson then served ashore, first as Chief of Staff to the Commander-in-Chief, Portsmouth and then as Commodore of Portsmouth Naval Barracks, where he undertook many innovations to raise morale including regular community singing. In 1929, he was part of the official British delegation at the funeral of Marshal Ferdinand Foch, acting as Naval Aide-de-camp to Prince George, and later that year was placed on the retired list, with promotion to rear admiral. He was appointed a Companion of the Order of the Bath in 1930. From 1932 to 1935 he was Secretary of the Navy League, and he was promoted to vice admiral in 1934. He also ran a boys' club near his Hampshire home, where he was nicknamed "Monkey Brand" as the boys thought his heavily whiskered face was like the image used to advertise a well-known household cleaning product.

== Second World War ==
With the outbreak of the Second World War in September 1939, Stephenson was recalled as Commodore, Royal Navy Reserve. Initially he served as a Commodore of Convoy and made several trips in that capacity. He was also involved in the Dunkirk evacuation.

In 1940 Stephenson was tasked with setting up the training base HMS Western Isles at Tobermory on the Isle of Mull in the Scottish Inner Hebrides. This was to be the Royal Navy's Anti-Submarine Training School for the remainder of the war and Stephenson's greatest legacy was that his training methods had an influence within the service that lasted long after the cessation of conflict.

Stephenson realised that the task of training war-time reservist officers and hostilities-only ratings required a different approach to that of training regulars. He believed that the most important priority was making the trainees determined to win; then that they understood the importance of discipline; next the importance of correct administration; and finally technical proficiency—he felt that skill would be worthless if overall spirit were lacking. He emphasised strict discipline in his training combined with encouraging a willingness to adapt quickly to various situations with surprise inspections and orders to trainees as well as creative wargames to simulate difficult situations at sea.

A frequently recounted anecdote is that when inspecting a corvette and its crew, Stephenson suddenly threw his hat on the deck and called it an unexploded bomb. A trainee (variously reported as quartermaster, or a sub-lieutenant) immediately kicked it into the water. After Stephenson commended him for quick action, but wanting his heavily gold-braided hat back, he then suddenly said the hat was now a man overboard and the trainee had to dive in to retrieve it.

Stephenson had the reputation of being a very hard taskmaster, with officers being replaced before the ship was allowed to leave (and even commanding officers being dismissed on occasion). However, he was reportedly very pleasant to those who matched his standards. Although he was disliked by the trainees, who called him "The Terror of Tobermory" and "The Monkey", Stephenson was credited in producing capable sailors who were able to meet the demands of the Battle of the Atlantic. As such, Stephenson is credited with being a factor in turning the tide in favour of the Allies in that critical contest in the war.

A noted fictionalised depiction of Stephenson and his Second World War assignment is presented in Nicholas Monsarrat's novel The Cruel Sea. Stephenson was reportedly very proud of this depiction.

Over the four-and-a-half years Stephenson ran the school, 911 ships went through 1132 training courses at HMS Western Isles. He was again Mentioned in Despatches in 1940, knighted as a Knight Commander of the Order of the British Empire in the 1943 Birthday Honours, and was later given the decoration of Commander with Star of the Royal Norwegian Order of St. Olav. He retired for the second time in 1945, with the anti-submarine battle won.

== Second retirement ==
This second retirement saw Stephenson just as active as he had been previously. He was appointed Honorary Commodore of the Sea Cadet Corps in 1949, a post he held until the age of eighty in 1958, when he finally felt it necessary to step down.

Stephenson settled in Saffron Walden, and took a strong interest in local affairs, being known locally as "The Admiral". He was appointed a Deputy Lieutenant of Essex in 1949, but resigned with 7 others in 1968. His name was listed as a sponsor of the National Fellowship in a full-page advertisement placed in The Times by the Fellowship in 1962.

Stephenson died in Saffron Walden on 27 May 1972, at the age of 94.
