= SS Baron Gautsch =

Austro-Hungarian passenger ship

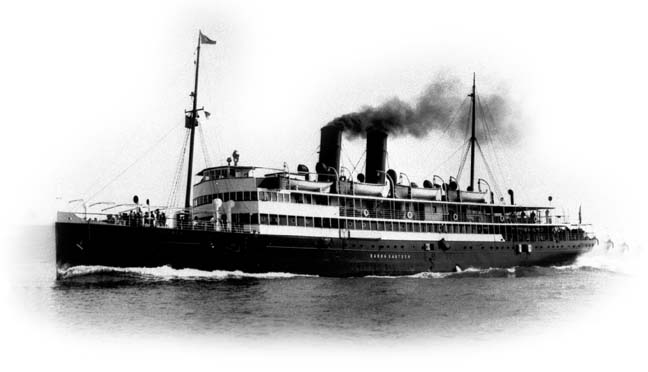
- Baron Gautsch sailing

History

Austria-Hungary
- Name: Baron Gautsch
- Owner: Österreichischer Lloyd
- Route: Trieste to Kotor
- Builder: Gourlay Brothers, Dundee
- Yard number: 229
- Launched: 3 May 1908
- Maiden voyage: 16 June 1908
- In service: 16 June 1908 – 13 August 1914
- Fate: Sunk by mine on 13 August 1914

General characteristics
- Tonnage: 2069 GRT and 861 NRT
- Length: 84.55 m
- Beam: 11.64 m
- Draught: 7.5 m
- Installed power: Three-cylinder steam engines with heavy oil heated steam boilers; 3 bronze propeller; output:4,600 hp (3,400 kW)
- Speed: 17 knots (31 km/h; 20 mph)
- Capacity: Passengers: 300, crew: 64. Total: 364

Baron Gautsch was an Austro-Hungarian passenger ship that sank in the northern Adriatic Sea on 13 August 1914, during its voyage from Kotor to Trieste, after running into a minefield laid by the Austro-Hungarian Navy. The sinking resulted in the deaths of 127 passengers and crew members. The ship was operated by Österreichischer Lloyd, and was built by the Gourlay Brothers shipyard in Dundee, United Kingdom.

== Background ==
Österreichischer Lloyd (English: Austrian Lloyd) was the largest and most successful Austro-Hungarian shipping company of its time, founded in 1833. The company's fleet was constantly growing, especially under the leadership of Julius Derschatta von Standhalt (1852–1924), Minister of Railways in the Austro-Hungarian Imperial Council and president of Lloyd. During his tenure as president, three new modern sister ships were ordered. These were Baron Gautsch in May 1908 (2,069 GRT), Prinz Hohenlohe in October 1908 (1962 GRT), and Baron Bruck in the summer of 1913 (2085 GRT). Since one of the largest shipyards in Austria-Hungary, the Stabilimento Tecnico Triestino in Trieste, was busy, Baron Gautsch and Prinz Hohenlohe were built at the Gourlay Brothers shipyard in Dundee, Scotland.

The ship was named after the former Austrian Prime Minister and Interior Minister Paul Gautsch von Frankenthurn. Baron Gautsch and its sister ships were built for the so-called Dalmatian Express Line, a route that went south of the Austrian Riviera along the coast of Istria and Dalmatia. The home port of each ship was Trieste. Baron Gautsch carried commuters, business and leisure travelers and summer guests who wanted to visit the popular seaside resorts of the Adriatic. It had its maiden voyage on 16 June 1908.

== Ship features ==
The 2069 GRT steamer Baron Gautsch was built at the Gourlay Brothers shipyard in the Scottish city of Dundee. It was transferred to the water on 3 May 1908. The ship was 84.5 meters long, 11.64 meters wide and had a maximum draft of 7.5 meters. The ship had three heated steam boilers, with heavy oil, that powered three bronze propellers via one steam engine. The engines had 4600 HP (3383 kW), which allowed a speed of 17 kn (31 km/h). Lloyd hoped to significantly increase the ship's performance with the installation of three steam engines, but when that did not happen Lloyd returned the ship to the shipyard for extensive modifications in Trieste at the cost of Gourlay Brothers. This was one of the reasons why the Gourlay Brothers shipyard went into bankruptcy and had to be liquidated in October 1910.

== During World War I ==
With the outbreak of World War I on 28 July 1914, all merchant ships in Austria-Hungary were put into the military service of the Austro-Hungarian Navy. Ships received camouflage and from that point served as auxiliary cruisers, troop carriers or supply ships. Many officers were reservists and entered the service of the Navy. On 27 July 1914 Baron Gautsch was pressed into service the Navy. This was followed by four sailings on which Baron Gautsch brought supplies for troops stationed in Kotor. During these four voyages, Baron Gautsch crossed 1810 miles and transported 2855 people. On each return trip, civilians were evacuated to the ports of the northern Adriatic. On 11 August 1914 Baron Gautsch completed all of its military tasks and was thus returned to Lloyd.

== Sinking ==
Before Baron Gautsch sailed one last time from Kotor back to Trieste, a conference of war naval authorities was held in Trieste. Baron Gautsch's second officer Tenze was present as a representative of Captain Paul Winter. At the conference, the commanders of ships were informed that the Navy planned to set mine fields in the northern Adriatic in order to protect the entrance to its main naval port, Pula. Tenze informed his captain about it, so the first officer Luppis set the ship's route for the following journey. Later, the crew of Baron Gautsch received further instructions regarding navigation from military authorities in Zadar via radio. On its way back, Baron Gautsch was carrying refugees from the territories of Bosnia and Herzegovina, people that were coming back home from holiday, including many women and children, as well as members of the Austro-Hungarian military that were on their way back to Austria. There were 66 crew members and 240 passengers on board (this data does not include children under 10 years of age and conscripted soldiers).

On 12 August 1914 Baron Gautsch sailed from Kotor to Trieste for the last time. The commander was Captain Paul Winter. On 13 August 1914, at 11:00 am, Baron Gautsch departed from harbour on the island of Veli Lošinj, and was sailing directly to the port of Trieste, where it was scheduled to arrive at 6.00 pm. From Veli Lošinj to Pula, the ship was officially sailing under the command of First Officer Josef Luppis, but this was not the case in reality. In fact, Luppis was handed over command by the captain in 2:00 pm, but he left the bridge, without Captain's knowledge, handing command to the relatively inexperienced second officer Tenze, and went to lunch with the first class passengers. Captain Winter was asleep in his cabin.

Baron Gautsch began sailing much further north than the military authorities had ordered earlier, and passed near the ship Prinz Hohenloheom, which was sailing south to Dalmatian Islands more than 3 nautical miles away from the coast. Even warnings by several passengers did not cause Tenze to change the ship's course. Tenze made several references about minefields in surrounding areas, and how Austro-Hungarian Navy had placed them to protect the port of Pula, but that did not make him change course. At 2:45 pm, seven nautical miles from the Brijuni islands, Baron Gautsch entered at full speed into a minefield that had just been set by the Navy forces. At this time the minelayer Basilisk saw Baron Gautsch sailing directly into the danger zone, so it gave warning signals, but the signals were not noticed or understood. At the last moment, Tenze recognized the threat and turned the wheel so the ship would go to the open sea, but this maneuver came too late because the ship was already in the middle of a minefield.

It was then that the ship hit the first mine, triggering a huge explosion on the port side of the ship that caused the tailgate to fly open and shook the steamer. Shortly afterwards, a second explosion occurred, probably triggered by a boiler explosion. Baron Gautsch heeled hard to port and quickly began to run fully. Passengers on board began panicking, leading to general chaos. Passengers rushed to the lifeboats, which quickly became crowded before they were swung over the deck. In others, the holders were so tightly lashed or intricate that they could not be used. Many passengers jumped overboard and drowned. Heavy fuel oil was running out from the cracked oil tanks, which irritated the nose, eyes and ears of those floating in the water and prevented them from breathing. Also, the oil caught fire and many of the passengers tragically burned alive. Passengers that survived testified afterwards that many members of the crew failed to care for the passengers, instead only caring about themselves. This is supported by the fact there were more crew members than passengers in many lifeboats. Baron Gautsch sank within about five to seven minutes after the first explosion. The Austro-Hungarian destroyers Csepel, Triglav and Balaton were nearby, so they were the first ships that came to the rescue of the victims. Together these ships saved 159 people from the water. However, 127 passengers, mostly women, children, and crew members, were killed. They were buried in the Military cemetery in Pula.

== Aftermath of sinking ==
Captain Winter and first officer Luppis survived and were placed under house arrest in Pula. Both of them were eventually found responsible for the disaster in a trial before Admiralty court. Nevertheless, it is known that both of them worked in the 1920s as skippers for the Lloyd Adriatico, during which time they also commanded transatlantic liners. Details from their trial and the verdict are unknown because the events were under war censorship, but also because it was believed that everything about the case should stay hidden from general public for morale reasons.

Survivors sued the Lloyd for damages. This was initially rejected, but Ministry of Commerce later allowed compensation in limited form of 200,000 crowns. Survivors who disagreed with this appealed in the courts. Almost all court documents about the sinking and the following processes were later lost. Numerous documents were lost during the July Revolt of 1927 when the Vienna Palace of Justice was burned down. Other documents were destroyed in Kristallnacht of 1938 because the lawyer of the survivors was a Jew and his office was ransacked.

In August 1994 a memorial service attended by representatives of the Catholic Church, the military and political parties was held in Rovinj for the 80th anniversary of the sinking. During this commemoration, Radiotelevisione italiana (RAI) presented its documentary about the tragedy. Floral wreaths were thrown into the sea, while a plaque was placed on the wreck. In October 1995, by the Decision of the Board for the Protection of Cultural Heritage, the wreck of Baron Gautsch was registered in the Register of Croatian Cultural Monuments.

On 12 June 2014 the diving club "Coral Sub" from Palmanova (Udine Italia) jointly with a number of diving center from Friuli and Croatia, promoted an evening to remember the ship. At the "G.da Modena" theatre in Palmanova, the event, led by the journalist Pietro Spirito was a great success with more than 200 divers and history fanatics attending.

== Wreck ==
The wreck of Baron Gautsch was found on 15 August 1958 by Slovenian diver Božo Dimnik. The wreck of Baron Gautsch is at the coordinates 44°56.25′N 13°34.40′E in 28 to 40 meters deep on sandy and stony ground. It is overgrown with algae and sponges. The wreck is not in a good condition because it is broken in many places and chimneys and masts are folded over. In addition, three propellers were removed. Nevertheless, this wreck is considered to be one of the most popular diving destinations for wreck divers in the northern Adriatic. In the 1920s, the Yugoslav Navy used this heavily damaged wreck as a practice target for attack maneuvers.

== Sources ==
- Ronald E. Coons: Steamships, statesmen and bureaucrats. Austrian policy towards the Steam Navigation Company of the Austrian Lloyd; 1836–1848. Franz Steiner Verlag, Wiesbaden 1975, ISBN 3-515-01983-9.
- Samuel George Edgar Lythe: Gourlays of Dundee: The Rise and Fall of a Scottish Shipbuilding Firm. Abertay Historical Society, Dundee 1964.
- John Leng (Hrsg.): The Dundee Year Book, Facts and Figures for 1908. Dundee 1909.
- Wladimir Aichelburg: Die Handelsschiffe Österreich-Ungarns im Weltkrieg 1914–1918. 1. Auflage. Herbert Weishaupt Verlag, Graz 1988.
- Hermann Pfeiffer: Halte Dich dicht an mich und eile! Der Untergang der Baron Gautsch. Braumüller, 2014, ISBN 978-3-99200-114-9.
- K.u.K. Staatsanwaltschaft in Rovigno: Anklageschrift gegen Kapitän Paul Winter und den Ersten Offizier Josef Luppis, Übersetzung, Wien o. J (Quelle: Allg. Verwaltungsarchiv, Abt. Verkehrsarchiv) Capitaneria di porto di Trieste, Denuncia di identificazione di relitto, No. 16806, 26. Ago. 1958.
