= SS Batavier II (1897) =

Ductch steam packet

- SS Batavier II, as she appeared from 1897 to 1909

History
- Name: Batavier II
- Owner: William Müller & Co.
- Operator: Batavier Line
- Port of registry: (Netherlands) Rotterdam
- Route: Rotterdam–London
- Builder: Gourlay Brothers, Dundee, Scotland
- Yard number: 176
- Launched: 17 August 1897
- Completed: October 1897
- Captured: seized as prize, 24 September 1916
- Fate: Shelled and sunk, 27 July 1917

General characteristics
- Type: steam packet
- Tonnage: as built: 1,136 GRT; after 1909: 1,335 GRT
- Length: as built: 74.4 m (244 ft 1 in) (lpp); after 1909: 79.7 m (261 ft 6 in)
- Beam: 10.2 m (33 ft 6 in)
- Propulsion: 1 × 4-cylinder, triple-expansion steam engine, 2,000 ihp (1,500 kW)
- Speed: 13 to 14 knots (24–26 km/h)
- Capacity: passengers: 44 first class; 27 second-class; 250 steerage

SS Batavier II was a steam packet for the Batavier Line that sailed between Rotterdam and London for most of her career. The ship was built in 1897 by the Gourlay Brothers of Dundee. The Dutch ship could carry a limited amount of freight and up to 321 passengers. She was rebuilt in 1909 which increased her length by over 5 metres (16 ft).

During World War I, the Batavier Line attempted to maintain service, but in September 1916, Batavier II was seized as a prize by German submarine UB-6 and sailed into Zeebrugge and retained. Ten months later, Batavier II was shelled by the British submarine E55 and sank near Texel.

== Career ==
Batavier II and her sister ship Batavier III were built for William Müller and Company by the Gourlay Brothers of Dundee, Scotland. The ship was launched on 17 August 1897. As built, she was 74.4 metres (244 ft 1 in) long (between perpendiculars) and 10.2 metres (33 ft 6 in) abeam. Batavier II was powered by a single 4-cylinder, triple-expansion steam engine of 2,000 indicated horsepower (1,500 kW) that moved her up to 14 knots (26 km/h). She could carry up to 321 passengers: 44 in first class, 27 in second class, and up to 250 in steerage. She was listed at 1,136 gross register tons (GRT).

Upon completion in October 1897, she joined the 683-ton Batavier I in packet service between Rotterdam and London. The pair were joined by Batavier III after her completion in November. In Rotterdam, the ships docked at the Willemsplein; in London, the ships originally docked near London Bridge, but in 1899 switched to the Customs House and Wool Quays near the Tower Bridge. Also beginning in 1899, Batavier Line service between Rotterdam and London was offered daily except Sundays; each of the ships made three round trips per week. In addition to passengers, Batavier II could also carry a limited quantity of freight. One example that may be typical was a load of 1 long ton (1.1 short tons) of dry chemical wood pulp in 5 bales carried to London in March 1907. In 1909, Batavier II was rebuilt to 1,335 GRT and lengthened by 5.3 metres (17 ft 5 in) to 79.7 metres (261 ft 6 in).

After the outbreak of World War I in August 1914, the Batavier Line continued service on the Rotterdam–London route. In December 1914, Batavier II made news when porters handling what was identified as a 750-pound (340 kg) crate of Swedish matches discovered an escaped German Army officer inside. The plan, apparently, was for him to be shipped from London to Rotterdam via Batavier II. The plot unraveled when the porters could only move the heavy crate by rolling it, which knocked the man unconscious; the officer was returned to the custody of British military officials.

In June 1915, passengers on Batavier II witnessed an attack by two German airplanes against a British steamship between the Galloper and the North Hinder Lightships. The attack was broken off when two British airplanes arrived over the ship to engage the German aircraft; none of the airplanes were destroyed, and the ship was unscathed.

On 24 September 1916, after Batavier II had departed from Rotterdam, the ship was stopped by the German submarine UB-6. She was seized as prize and sailed into German-held Zeebrugge. There, Batavier II's Dutch crew and women and children passengers were released and sent via train to Rotterdam. The Germans confiscated the ship's cargo of food. Also on board Batavier II were four escaped Russian prisoners of war and Richard Hansemann, a German-born New York businessman. American newspapers carried reports of Hansemann's plight, reporting by 1 October that he would likely be impressed into the German Army.

Batavier II's whereabouts and activities over the next ten months are uncertain. She remained under German control for a time, but how long is not clear from sources. Batavier II was back under Dutch control by late July 1917.

On 27 July 1917, Batavier II was shelled by the British submarine E55 just outside Dutch territorial waters. (Note: Sources alternately identify the submarine as HMS L55, upon which construction had not yet begun in July 1917; or "C55"', never used by a British submarine. See: "Capture of Dutch ship by submarine". The Christian Science Monitor. 1 August 1917. p. 1. Also see: "How Batavier II was sunk". The New York Times. 1 August 1917. p. 2.) Damaged by E55's gunfire, Batavier II's crew steered her back into Dutch territorial waters. E55 then sent a prize crew on board Batavier II and sailed her back outside Dutch waters. By the time a Dutch torpedo boat arrived on the scene, Batavier II was taking on water and had drifted back into Dutch territory. The torpedo boat sent the message "respect neutrality" to E55 which retrieved her prize crew and departed. Despite efforts to stem the flow of water, Batavier II sank 1 nautical mile (1.9 km) from the Molengat North Buoy, off Texel.

== Bibliography ==
- van Ysselsteyn, Hendrik Albert (1908). The Port of Rotterdam (3d ed.). Rotterdam: Nijgh & Van Ditmar's Publishing Co. OCLC 60983381.
