= Gourlay Brothers =

Scottish marine engineering and shipbuilding company

Gourlay Brothers and Company (Dundee) Ltd.
- Type: Private limited company
- Industry: Marine engineering Shipbuilding
- Predecessor: Gourlay, Mudie & Co. (1846-1853); Gourlay Brothers & Co. (1853-1904)
- Founded: 1791 (Dundee Foundry)
- Defunct: 1908
- Headquarters: Dundee, Scotland, UK

Gourlay Brothers was a marine engineering and shipbuilding company based in Dundee, Scotland. It existed between 1846 and 1908.

== Company history ==
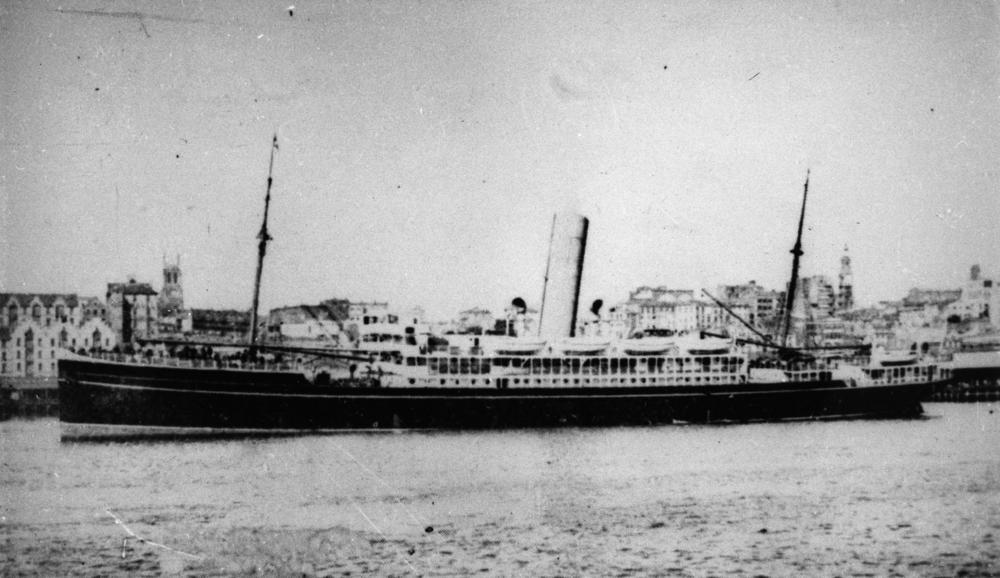
Ulimaroa launched in 1907

The company had its origins in the Dundee Foundry, founded in 1791. By 1820 the foundry was manufacturing steam engines, building engines and boilers for the steam tug William Wallace in 1829, and in the 1830s building locomotives for the Dundee and Newtyle and the Arbroath and Forfar Railways. James Stirling (1800–1876) was manager of the Dundee Foundry until 1846.

In 1846 the Foundry was taken over and renamed Gourlay, Mudie & Co. This company was dissolved in 1853, and then operated as Gourlay Brothers & Co., with four brothers – Alexander, William, Gershom, and Henry Gourlay – as partners.

In May 1854, Gourlay's turned to shipbuilding, leasing land at the east end of Marine Parade to use as a slipway. Their first vessels were built for the coastal trade, but they went on to build a number of cargo ships for the Dundee, Perth and London Shipping Company. The business prospered, largely due to the efforts of Henry Gourlay, a member of the Institution of Engineers and Shipbuilders in Scotland and of the Institution of Naval Architects. By 1866 Gourlay's had become the largest of the five shipbuilding firms in Dundee, employing about 300 men, and building 14,000 tons of shipping between 1861 and 1867. In 1867 they launched the Dundee of 1,295 tons, at that time the largest ship built on the Tay. In 1869 Gourlay's leased more land downriver from their yard, which they named Camperdown Dock, enabling even larger ships to be built. In 1871 five vessels were launched, all of more than 1,000 tons. In 1876 seven of the twenty-three ships built in Dundee were launched from Gourlay's yard. However, a serious slump in shipbuilding occurred in the mid-1880s, with Gourlay's building only three ships totalling 4,000 tons in 1885 and 1886. The recovery came with the resumption of international orders; in 1890, Gourlay's built 11,616 tons of shipping, with orders coming from South Africa, South America, India, Russia, Australia, Finland, Turkey and France.

Gershom Gourlay, the last of the original partners, retired in 1889, and his sons, Henry Garrett and Charles Gershom Gourlay, with James Gordon Lyon, became the directors of the company. Another slump occurred in the mid-1890s, with 1894 the worst year for orders yet, with only three small paddle-boats built. Ship repairing and refitting helped to provide some employment, but it was not until 1897 that orders begin to rise. Although Gourlay's were pioneers in the use of the screw propeller, they now gained a reputation for building paddle steamers. British railway companies became regular customers, and of the thirty vessels built between 1902 and 1908, nine were for the Great Eastern, the Great Central, and the London and South Western Railways.

Unfortunately, labour relations soured, and between 1902 and 1904 the yard experienced a three-week strike by joiners, a demarcation dispute, a 14-week strike by engineers, and various minor disputes. In 1904 the yard had been virtually closed, its total output being a 364-ton ship and two tugs. The same year it became a private joint stock company under the name of Gourlay Brothers & Company (Dundee) Ltd. with Charles Gershom Gourlay holding the controlling majority of shares, with Henry, Fanny, Kenneth and William Gourlay, James Lyon and William Fyffe holding lesser amounts.

Output for 1905 reached a total of nearly 12,000 tons, and that year also saw the completion of a modernisation programme, with new machinery and complete electrification of the yard. In 1906 Gourlay's launched over 12,600 tons of shipping, its most productive year yet. However the following year output sank to only 6,276 tons. The lack of orders and the expensive modernisation programme led the company into serious debt. This, along with higher prices of raw materials, pushed up the cost of building, shortening profit margins. Demand for new shipping continued to fall and by the end of 1907 orders were few.

On 8 June 1908, the company was finally wound up. In May 1909 the equipment of the Yard and Foundry were sold at public auction, and on 23 June 1910, the company was formally dissolved. In its time Gourlay's launched over 200 ships.

== Ships constructed ==
Ship	Yard No.	GRT	Owners	Type	Date of launch
Alma	1		For Australian owners.	Three masted iron schooner	29 November 1854
Pavo	2			Iron Screw Steamer	18 July 1855
London	3	785 tons	Dundee, Perth and London Shipping Company	Iron screw steamer	7 April 1856
Mexicana	4	300 tons	Liverpool Owners	Full rigged brig	15 October 1856
Hamburg	5	600 tons	Dundee and London Steam Shipping Company		8 June 1857
Ydun	8		Paterson of Randers for services between Copenhagen and Jutland	Iron Screw Steamer	17 March 1859.
Princess Alice		440 tons			30 March 1860
Mendoza	9				12 January 1861
Dalhousie	10				9 February 1861
Scotia	11	800 tons	Dundee, Perth and London Steam Shipping Company	Screw Steamer	21 September 1861
Forfarshire	12				20 June 1861
Arauco	13	604 tons	Balfour, Williamson and Company, Liverpool	Iron screw steamer	29 March 1862
Scotia (II)	14		Dundee and London Shipping Company		9 October 1862
Rangatara	15	300 tons			21 January 1863
Shooey Leen	17				6 May 1863
Anglia	18		Dundee and London Steam Shipping Company		15 September 1863
Wangania	19	170 tons			30 July 1863
The Cohen		774 tons	Peninsular and Oriental Steam Navigation Company		12 December 1863
Tararua					1864
Grampian	20		Panama and New Zealand Mail Boat Company		21 April 1864
Stork	23	950 tons	General Steam Navigation Company, London		20 July 1864
Unknown Tug					12 October 1864
Hibernia	22	830 tons	Dundee, Perth, and London Shipping Company		12 January 1865
Dundee	25	1300 tons	Gilroy Brothers	Iron Sailing Ship	25 January 1865
Brage	27	209 tons		Iron	8 June 1865
Gallia	26	440.5 tons		Iron	10 August 1865
Vesper	29	476 tons		Iron	2 December 1865
Eider	28	581 tons			1 March 1866
Niord	31	247 tons			1866
Granton	30	1000 tons			1866
Curfew	34				1867
Mary	32				1867
Dundee					1867
Unknown		548 tons		Iron Screw Steamer	8 February 1868
Cambria	35	680 tons	Dundee, Perth and London Shipping Company		7 May 1868
Lebu	36	800 tons	Balfour, Williamson and Company, Liverpool		21 July 1868
La Escossesa	37	998 tons	Balfour, Williamson and Company, Liverpool		16 October 1868
Viking	38	860 tons	consortium of Dundee merchants	Iron Screw Steamer	28 January 1869
Chacabuco	39	1008 tons	Balfour, Williamson and Company, Liverpool. Intended for voyages to Sydney	Iron Screw Steamer	27 April 1869
Libra	41	617 tons	General Steam Navigation Company	Steamer	10 July 1869
Asturias	42	260 tons			22 September 1869
Lota	40	762 tons	Balfour, Williamson and Company, Liverpool	Iron screw steamer	6 November 1869
Maormer	43	881 tons			17 February 1870
Agrigento	44	995 tons			1870
Virgo	46	1000 tons		Iron Screw Steamer	8 November 1870
Jose A. Morene	45	535 tons			30 May 1870
Covadonga	47	590 tons		Iron Screw Steamer	24 September 1870
Strathtay	48	1081 tons	William Thomson, Dundee		8 March 1871
Thane	49	1074 tons	R. A. Mudie and Company, Dundee		22 April 1871
Ariel	50	1107 tons	Blythe Brothers, London to trade between London and Brazil		17 June 1871
Chesapeake	52	1215 tons	J.A. Dunkerley, Hull	Iron Screw Steamer	8 April 1872
Rainbow	53	1088 tons	General Steam Navigation Company	Iron Screw Steamer	28 October 1871
Shannon	51	1210 tons	Dunkerley, Hull		19 August 1871
Selinunte	54	1290 tons	Built for Italian owners for the Mediterranean trade		27 January 1872
Kenilworth	55	2537 tons	Williamson, Milligan and Company, Liverpool		20 August 1872
Malaga	57	1007 tons	Malcolm and Company, London for the Mediterranean iron ore trade	Steamer	18 September 1872
Pelayo	58	700 tons		Steamer	13 January 1873
SS Abbotsford	56	2537 tons	Williamson, Milligan and Company of Liverpool		29 March 1873
Taormina	60	1570 tons	Trinacria Steam Navigation Company	Schooner rigged Iron Screw Steamer	13 May 1873
Butuam	61	463 tons	Pickford of Manilla	Iron Screw Steamer	7 August 1873
Thibet	62	2600 tons	Peninsular and Oriental Steamship Company	Steamer	29 August 1874
Teheran	59	2690 tons	For the Peninsular and Oriental Steamship Company	Steamer	20 March 1874
Honfleur	64		London, Brighton and South Coast Railway	Steamer	1875
Piles	63	300 tons	Gijon Steam Navigation Company	Steamer	1 July 1874
Zampa	66		United Steam Ship Company of Copenhagen. Cattle carrier	Iron Paddle Steamer	1875
Riberhuus	67	840 tons	United Steam Ship Company of Copenhagen. Cattle carrier	Iron Paddle Steamer	20 May 1875
Strathearn	68	1160 tons	William Thomson, Dundee	Iron Ship	3 August 1875
Tern	69			Iron Screw 3 mast Steamer	16 August 1875
Curlew	65		R. A. Mudie	Screw steamer	8 February 1875
Condor	71	500 tons	General Steam Navigation Company, London	Iron Screw Steamer	14 December 1875
Hawk	72			Iron Screw Steamer	23 October 1875
Oaklands	73	1000 tons		Iron Ship	28 March 1876
Gijon	70	736 tons	Senor Polo of Gijon	Iron Screw Steamer	2 August 1875
Stracathro	75	1200 tons		Iron "Clipper" Ship	21 August 1876
Arthurstone	76			Iron Clipper Ship	18 October 1876
Aurora	77			Screw Steamer	25 July 1876
Strathtay	78	1300 tons	William Thomson of Dundee	Steam Ship	13 January 1877
Britannia	79	950 tons	London Shipping Company	Iron Screw Steamer	17 March 1877
SS Bonnie Dundee	80	300 tons		Screw Steamer	2 March 1877
Barcelona	81	1850 tons	William Thomson, Dundee	Iron Screw Steamer	21 March 1878
John O’Groat	82			Screw Steamer	28 May 1877
Mayfield	83			Screw Steamer	28 July 1877
Curfew	84	800 tons	R. A. Mudie and Sons, coal merchants, Dundee	Screw Steamer	8 September 1877
Diamond	85	620 tons	P.M. Duncan, coal merchant	Screw Steamer	25 October 1877
Emerald	86	620 tons	P.M. Duncan, coal merchant	Steam Ship	6 December 1877
Kestrel	87	950 tons	General Steam Navigation Company, London	Iron Screw Steamer	5 March 1878
Loch Leven	88	560 tons		Screw Steamer	20 April 1878
Loch Awe	89	560 tons	Ireland, Leitch and Company	Screw Steamer	3 July 1878
Richmond	90		George Nicoll, Sydney		8 June 1878
Loch Earn	91			Screw Steamer	26 September 1878
Balmuir	92	1531 tons	John Machan, Dundee	Iron Screw Steamer	25 January 1879
Lapwing	93	1214 tons	General Steam Navigation Company, London	Iron Screw Steamer	6 March 1879
Amethyst	94	933 tons	P.M. Duncan, Dundee	Iron Screw Steamer	8 May 1879
Aranco	95	800 tons	Pacific Steam Navigation Company, Liverpool	Iron Screw Steamer	24 April 1879
Puchoco	96	800 tons	Pacific Steam Navigation Company, Liverpool	Iron Screw Steamer	18 June 1879
Carlos	97	846 tons	A. C. de Freitas and Company, Hamburg	Iron Screw Steamer	22 July 1879
Australian	98	362 tons	G.B. Nicoll and Company, Sydney	Iron Screw Steamer	4 September 1879
Loch Garry	99	949 tons	Ireland, Leitch and Company, Dundee	Iron Screw Steamer	13 January 1880
Loch Maree	100	947 tons	Ireland, Leitch and Company, Dundee	Iron Screw Steamer	25 February 1880
Avlona	101	1953 tons	William Thomson, Dundee	Iron Screw Steamer	27 April 1880
Lismore	102	339 tons	G. and B. Nicoll, Sydney	Iron Screw Steamer	10 February 1880
Garnet	103	1004 tons	P.M. Duncan, Dundee	Iron Screw Steamer	22 May 1880
Spey	104	1004 tons	George Armistead and Company, Dundee	Iron Screw Steamer	22 June 1880
Loch Rannoch	105	1642 tons	Ireland, Leitch and Company, Dundee	Steel Screw Steamer	21 September 1880
Ganges	106	2360 tons	David Bruce and Company, Dundee	Iron Screw Steamer	17 November 1880
Carmona	107	3715 tons	William Thomson, Dundee	Iron Screw Steamer	28 April 1881
Waverley	108	3096 tons	Williamson, Milligan and Company, Liverpool	Iron Screw Steamer	28 July 1881
Merton Hall	109	4140 tons	Alexander and Radcliffe’s Hall Line, Liverpool	Steel Screw Steamer	22 December 1881
Casino	110	425 tons	B.B. Nicoll, Sydney	Iron Screw Steamer	21 February 1882
Mallard	111	1296 tons	General Steam Navigation Company, London	Iron Screw Steamer	4 May 1882
Helen Nicoll	112	284 tons	George Nicoll, Brisbane	Iron Screw Steamer	21 February 1882
Aston Hall	113	3568 tons	Alexander and Radcliffe’s Hall Line, Liverpool	Iron Screw Steamer	13 September 1882
Isla	114	1130 tons	North Sea Steamship Company, Dundee		19 June 1883
Loch Tay	115	1310 tons	Loch Line Company, Dundee	Steamship	12 December 1882
Eden Hall	116	3610 tons	Alexander and Radcliffe’s Hall Line, Liverpool	Iron Screw Steamer	25 April 1883
Dundee	117	1565 tons	Dundee, Perth and London Shipping Company	Steel Screw Steamer	23 May 1883
Peverill	118	3036 tons	Williamson, Milligan and Company, Liverpool	Steel Screw Steamer	9 February 1883
Invertay	119	1289 tons	Charles Barrie, Dundee	Steel Screw Steamer	15 September 1883
Cygnet	120	1272 tons	General Steam Navigation Company	Steel Screw Steamer	20 September 1883
Martos	121	1503 tons	Senor Lister, Valencia	Iron Screw Steamer	1 November 1883
Indus	122	2486 tons	David Bruce and Company, Dundee	Steel Screw Steamer	10 April 1884
Dracona	123	1903 tons	William Thomson and Sons, Dundee	Steel Screw Steamer	27 May 1884
Escalona	124	1904 tons	William Thomson and Sons, Dundee	Steel Screw Steamer	10 July 1884
Abden	135	376 tons	London and Kirkcaldy Shipping Company		2 October 1884
Richmond	126	628 tons	Messrs B. B. Nicoll and Company of Sydney		19 May 1885
Loch Etive	127	2315 tons	Dundee Loch Line Shipping Company	Steel Screw Steamer	21 January 1886
Dundee (III)	128	1305 tons	Dundee, Perth and London Shipping Company	Steel Screw Steamer	7 November 1885
Dean	129	1310 tons	North Sea Steam Shipping Company	Steel Screw Steamer	21 May 1887
Theodora	130	477 tons	Mr. Morton, London	Steel Screw Steamer Yacht	7 May 1887
Grebe	131	814 tons	General Steam Navigation Company	Steel Screw Steamer	8 July 1887
Fremona	132	2900 tons	William Thomson and Sons, Dundee	Steel Screw Steamer	15 November 1887
Gerona	133	3100 tons	William Thomson and Sons, Dundee	Steel Screw Steamer	9 August 1888
Ardle	134	1390 tons	North Sea Steam Shipping Company, Dundee	Steel Screw Steamer	17 October 1888
Dean	135	1476 tons	George Armistead and Company, Dundee	Steel Screw Steamer	17 January 1889
Oceana	136	311 tons	William Watkins and Company, London	Iron Twin Screw Tug Steamer	27 March 1889
Loch Katrine	137	1476 tons	Dundee Loch Line Steam Ship Company	Steel Screw Steamer	3 April 1889
Parkmore (or Queensmore?)	138	3800 tons	William Johnston and Company, Liverpool	Steel Screw Steamer	9 November 1890
Circassie	139	2241 tons	N. Pacquet and Company, Marseilles	Steel Screw Steamer	19 February 1890
Burrawong	140	391 tons	John See, Sydney	Twin Screw Steamer	12 September 1889
Heron	141	879 tons	General Steam Navigation Company, London	Iron Screw Steamer	21 December 1889
America	142	5020 tons	National Steamship Company, Liverpool. Largest vessel built in Dundee to date	Steel Hull 4 mast Steamer	26 November 1890
Hirondelle	143	1610 tons	General Steam Navigation Company, London	Steel Screw Steamer	7 May 1890
Bullarra	144	1725 tons	Adelaide Steamship Company	Steel Screw Steamer	11 September 1890
Massilia	145	2965 tons	French Steam Navigation Company to trade between Marseille and New York	Steel Screw Steamer	10 January 1891
Ptarmigan	146	780 tons	General Steam Navigation Company	Iron Screw Steamer	28 January 1891
Richard King	147	327 tons		Iron Twin Screw Tug Steamer	22 June 1891
Assistance	148	214 tons		Steel Screw Tug	1891
Mustang	149	387 tons	Robert Thomson, Fenchurch Avenue, London	Steel Screw Steamer	20 August 1891
Athenai	150	2404 tons	Companie Navigation a Vapeur Panhellenique, Piraeus	Steel Screw Steamer	17 October 1891
Sparti	151	2404 tons	Companie Navigation a Vapeur Panhellenique, Piraeus	Steel Screw Steamer	19 November 1891
Byzantion	152	2404 tons	Companie Navigation a Vapeur Panhellenique, Piraeus	Steel Screw Steamer	14 January 1892
London	153	1737 tons	Dundee, Perth and London Shipping Company	Steel Screw Steamer	15 March 1892
Dungeness	154	1201 tons	Clyde Shipping Company, Glasgow	Iron Screw Steamer	12 May 1892
Iona	155	3343 tons	William Thomson and Sons, Dundee	Steel Screw Steamer	7 September 1892
Matim	156	3900 tons	R.A. Mudie and Sons, Dundee	Steel Screw Steamer	3 April 1893
Villam	157	650 tons	Leopold Schwarz	Steel Screw Steamer	15 August 1893
Nour-el-Bahr	158		Thomson and Campbell, London for Turkish owners	Steel Screw Steamer	25 November 1893
Scotia	159	223 tons	Dundee Pleasure Boat Company	Paddle Steamer	17 March 1894
Fenerbahce	160	286 tons	Joseph Constant of London for the Turkish Government	Paddle Steamer	6 June 1894
Haydarpascha	161	286 tons	Joseph Constant of London for the Turkish Government	Paddle Steamer	6 July 1894
Juno	162	760 tons	Straits Steamship Company, Singapore	Steel Screw Steamer	24 May 1895
Sardinia	163	1100 tons	James Currie and Company, Leith	Steel Screw Steamer	19 July 1895
Oratios Couppas	164	2550 tons	Nicolas Couppa, Marseilles	Single Screw Steel Steamer	19 September 1895
Puri	165	936 tons	India Steam Navigation Company intended to trade between Calcutta and Chanballi	Twin Screw Steamer	19 October 1895
Progress	166	68 tons	John P Bruce of Dundee	Screw Tug	25 June 1895
Pas De Carvalho	167	459 tons	Amazon Steam Navigation Company of South America	Steel Twin Screw Steamer	18 December 1895
Antonia Olyntho	168	459 tons	Amazon Steam Navigation Company, Paraguay	Steel Twin Screw Steamer	11 January 1896
Daniel Erno	169	644 tons	Leopold Schwartz, Buda-Pesth	Steel Screw Steamer	30 March 1896
Rotterdam	170	1091 tons	James Rankine and Son, Glasgow and Grangemouth	Steel Screw Steamer	11 August 1896
Hesperus	171	570 tons	Commissioners of Northern Lights	Steel Twin Screw Steamer	22 October 1896
Excelsior	172	290 tons	G. Nicoll of Sydney		17 February 1897
Fenchurch	174	3290 tons	David Bruce and Company, Dundee and London	Screw Steamer	16 July 1897
Euro	175	235 tons	David Bruce and Company, London for the Adelaide Steam Tug Company	Steel Screw Tug	22 April 1897
SS Batavier II	176	1140 tons	Nederlandsche Stoomboot Maatschappij (Netherlands Steamboat Company), Rotterdam	Steel Screw Steamer	17 August 1897
SS Batavier III	177	1140 tons	Nederlandsche Stoomboot Maatschappij (Netherlands Steamboat Company), Rotterdam	Steel Screw Steamer	14 September 1897
Sir John	178	400 tons	Government of Natal	Iron & Steel Twin Screw Tug	1 June 1897
Wellamo	179	1035 tons	Finska Steamship Company, Helsingfors	Steel Screw Steamer	25 November 1897
Oihonna	180	1025 tons	Finska Steamship Company, Finland	Steel Screw Steamer	23 February 1898
Eagle	181	620 tons	General Steam Navigation Company of London. For passenger traffic on the Thames	Paddle steamer	6 April 1898
Coburg	182	930 tons	James Currie and Company	Steel Screw Steamer 3 mast	2 July 1898
SS Arcturus	183	2050 tons	Finska Steamship Company, Helsingfors, Finland	Steel Screw Steamer	1 October 1898
Polaris	184	2050 tons	Finska Steamship Company, Helsingfors	Screw Steamer	15 December 1898
Zealandia	185			Steel Screw Steamer	29 March 1899
Minto	186			Steel Screw Steamer	12 July 1899
Belvoir Castle	187			Steel Screw Ketch	27 February 1899
Dreadnought	188			Trawler	24 March 1899
Marwarri	189				16 December 1899
Defender	190			Steel Screw Trawler	24 March 1899
Taymouth	191			Trawler, Steel Screw Ketch	1899
Tayside	192			Trawler	27 May 1899
Ngapuhi	193	680	Northern Steamship Company	Steel Twin Screw Steamer	18 April 1900
Norfolk	194	295	Great Eastern Railway	Paddle steamer	25 April 1900
Lady North	195			Twin Screw Steamer	18 May 1900
Bengali	196			Steel Screw Steamer	20 December 1900
Monte Video	197			Single Screw	3 July 1901
Ingerid	198			Single Screw	19 April 1901
Kuranda	199				11 October 1901
Harry Escombe	200			Steel & Iron Twin Screw Steamer	14 November 1901
SS Cromer	201			Steel Twin Screw Steamer	1902
SS Brussels	202			Twin Screw Passenger Steamer	26 March 1902
Victoria	203				21 June 1902
SS Batavier IV	204				17 October 1902
SS Batavier V	205				28 November 1902
Kirkcaldy	206			Steel Screw Steamer	13 December 1902
Rarawa	207	1072	Northern Steamship Company	Steel Twin Screw Steamer	30 April 1903
Yarmouth	208			Twin screw	24 July 1903
Cleethorpes	209			Paddle Steamer	6 October 1903
Alice	210				31 October 1903
Neptune	211			Single Screw	13 February 1904
No 1	212		Great Central Railway	Tug	1904
No 2	213		Great Central Railway	Tug	1904
Den of Kelly	214			Single Screw	3 February 1905
Den of Mains	215			Steel Screw Steamer	5 June 1905
SS Ada	216		London and South Western Railway	Steel Screw Steamer	4 April 1905
Lismore	217				30 September 1905
Rio Mar	218			Steel Twin Screw Steamer	19 September 1905
SS Bertha	219		London and South Western Railway	Screw Steamer	9 November 1905
Londres	220			Triple Screw Steamer	7 April 1906
Woodcock	221			Steel Screw Steamer	7 June 1906
Phrygie	223		Paquet and Co, Marseilles		15 November 1906
Emanuel N. Underdown	225			Double ended ferry for Havana Harbour	4 October 1906
SS Princess Ena	224	1198	London and South Western Railway	Steel Twin Screw Steamer	25 May 1906
Registan	222				21 August 1906
Ulimaroa	226				11 July 1907
Atalanta	227			Twin Screw	26 April 1907
Titania	228			Steel Screw Steamer	19 March 1908
Baron Gautsch	229			Steel Triple Screw Steamer	3 May 1908
Prinz Hohenlohe	230			Triple Screw Steamer	30 April 1908
