= SS Abbotsford =

History

United Kingdom
- Name: SS Abbotsford
- Operator: 1873: Red Star Line; 1874: American Line
- Port of registry: (United Kingdom) Liverpool
- Builder: Gourlay Brothers, Dundee, Scotland
- Launched: 29 March 1873
- Maiden voyage: Liverpool–Queenstown–Philadelphia, 10 May 1873
- Fate: Sank off Anglesey, 23 July 1875

General characteristics
- Tonnage: 2,554 gross register tons (GRT)
- Length: 345 ft 11 in (105.44 m)
- Beam: 37 ft 2 in (11.33 m)
- Propulsion: Single screw
- Sail plan: Four masts
- Speed: 14 knots (26 km/h)
- Capacity: 30 Saloon, 650 steerage passengers
- Notes: Single funnel, iron hull

The SS Abbotsford was a brig-rigged iron passenger ship built by the Gourlay Brothers of Dundee for the Red Star Line, of Antwerp. Despite the company's home in Belgium, the liner was registered in Liverpool and flew the British flag.

She was launched on 29 March 1873. Her maiden voyage from Liverpool to Philadelphia started on 10 May 1873 for the Red Star.

On 24 November 1874 the Abbotsford collided with the Indus on the way to New York from Antwerp. Repairs were made in London, England. That same year, small pox broke out on the ship forcing the hospitalization of 8 passengers with the other passengers sent to Liverpool.

On 7 January 1875 a machinery failure disabled the Abbotsford while easterly bound and she was taken in tow by the Pennsylvania. A slight collision occurred in towing.

On 21 July 1875, the Abbotsford was driven ashore in Cummons Bay, Anglesey. Passengers were landed within 30 minutes and lodged at Amlwch. She was on a voyage from Philadelphia to Liverpool. On 23 July the Abbotsford heeled over and sank. She was replaced in service by the City of Limerick.
