= Cape Cove =

Coordinates: 49.652°N 54.037°W

Location of Cape Cove in Newfoundland and Labrador

Cape Cove is a vacated or seasonal settlement in Newfoundland and Labrador located on the northeast side of Fogo island. Cape Cove in 1945 had a population of 51 and was a resettled community settled in the early 1800s by Irish Roman Catholic settlers. The settlement was first reported in a census in 1845, with an original population of three. The population were all most likely involved in fishing and sealing. By 1901 the population reached 41 (all of which were Roman Catholics) and had one school and fishing was the dominant economic base of Cape Cove. Cape Cove could only be accessed by boat.
