= HMS E55 =

Submarine of the Royal Navy

- HMS E55

History

United Kingdom
- Name: E55
- Builder: William Denny, Dumbarton
- Yard number: 1032
- Launched: 5 February 1916
- Commissioned: March 1916
- Fate: Sold, 6 September 1922

General characteristics
- Class & type: E-class submarine
- Displacement: 662 long tons (673 t) surfaced; 807 long tons (820 t) submerged
- Length: 181 ft (55 m)
- Beam: 15 ft (4.6 m)
- Propulsion: 2 × 800 hp (597 kW) diesel; 2 × 420 hp (313 kW) electric; 2 screws
- Speed: 15 knots (28 km/h; 17 mph) surfaced; 10 knots (19 km/h; 12 mph) submerged
- Range: 3,000 nmi (5,600 km) at 10 kn (19 km/h; 12 mph) surfaced; 65 nmi (120 km) at 5 kn (9.3 km/h; 5.8 mph) surfaced
- Complement: 31
- Armament: 5 × 18 inch (450 mm) torpedo tubes (2 bow, 2 beam, 1 stern); 1 × 12-pounder gun

HMS E55 was a British E-class submarine built by William Denny, Dumbarton as Yard No.1032. She was launched on 5 February 1916 and was delivered on 25 March 1916. E55 was sold for scrap at Newcastle on 6 September 1922.

== Design ==
Like all post-E8 British E-class submarines, E55 had a displacement of 662 long tons (673 t) at the surface and 807 long tons (820 t) while submerged. She had a total length of 180 feet (55 m) and a beam of 22 feet 8.5 inches (6.922 m). She was powered by two 800 horsepower (600 kW) eight-cylinder two-stroke diesel engines and two 420 horsepower (310 kW) electric motors made by Bellis & Marcom. The submarine had a maximum surface speed of 16 knots (30 km/h; 18 mph) and a submerged speed of 10 knots (19 km/h; 12 mph). British E-class submarines had fuel capacities of 50 long tons (51 t) of diesel and ranges of 3,255 miles (5,238 km; 2,829 nmi) when travelling at 10 knots (19 km/h; 12 mph). E55 was capable of operating submerged for five hours when travelling at 5 knots (9.3 km/h; 5.8 mph).

E55 was constructed with a 12-pounder 76 mm (3.0 in) QF gun mounted forward of the conning tower, although this was later removed. She had five 18 inch (450 mm) torpedo tubes, two in the bow, one either side amidships, and one in the stern; a total of 10 torpedoes were carried.

E-Class submarines had wireless systems with 1 kilowatt (1.3 hp) power ratings; in some submarines, these were later upgraded to 3 kilowatts (4.0 hp) systems by removing a midship torpedo tube. Their maximum design depth was 100 feet (30 m) although in service some reached depths of below 200 feet (61 m). Some submarines contained Fessenden oscillator systems.

== Service ==
E55 joined the 8th Submarine Flotilla, part of the Harwich Force, following commissioning. In mid-April 1916, E55 was fitted with knife-edged hydroplanes and bow for experiments in net cutting, which allowed the effectiveness of different types of anti-submarine net to be evaluated. On 3 May, E55 left Harwich to patrol off Terschelling as part of Operation XX, a large scale operation in which a seaplane attack on Tondern would be carried out in an attempt to lure the German High Seas Fleet out to sea where it could be attacked. E55 saw nothing of interest during the operation. On 30 May 1916, the eve of the Battle of Jutland, E55, together with E26 and D1, set out from Harwich to patrol off the Vyl Lightvessel. E55 arrived near Horns Rev on 31 May, and after sighting a German airship, settled to the bottom to save her batteries, and although several explosions were heard, nothing was seen during daylight on 1 June. On the afternoon of 2 June, E55 spotted the German submarine U-64, and fired a single torpedo which missed. On 29 July 1916, E55 attacked a German submarine off the Schouwen Bank, but two torpedoes missed while a third stuck in the torpedo tube and could not be launched.

In August 1916, the Royal Navy reorganised its submarine flotillas, with the Harwich based submarines, including E55, joining the newly established 9th Submarine Flotilla. E55 remained part of the 9th Flotilla until the end of the war. In May 1919, E55 was listed as part of the 3rd Submarine Flotilla, part of the Atlantic Fleet.

E55 was sold for scrap on 6 September 1922.

== Bibliography ==
- Campbell, John (1998). Jutland: An Analysis of the Fighting. London: Conway Maritime Press. ISBN 0-85177-750-3.
- Dittmar, F. J.; Colledge, J. J. (1972). British Warships 1914–1919. Shepperton, UK: Ian Allan. ISBN 0-7110-0380-7.
- Hutchinson, Robert (2001). Jane's Submarines: War Beneath the Waves from 1776 to the Present Day. London: HarperCollins. ISBN 978-0-00-710558-8. OCLC 53783010.
- Monograph No. 31: Home Waters Part VI: From October 1915 to May 1916 (PDF). Naval Staff Monographs (Historical). Vol. XV. Naval Staff, Training and Staff Duties Division. 1926.
- Monograph No. 33: Home Waters Part VII: From June 1916 to November 1916 (PDF). Naval Staff Monographs (Historical). Vol. XVII. Naval Staff, Training and Staff Duties Division. 1927.
