= Shipping services of the London and South Western Railway =

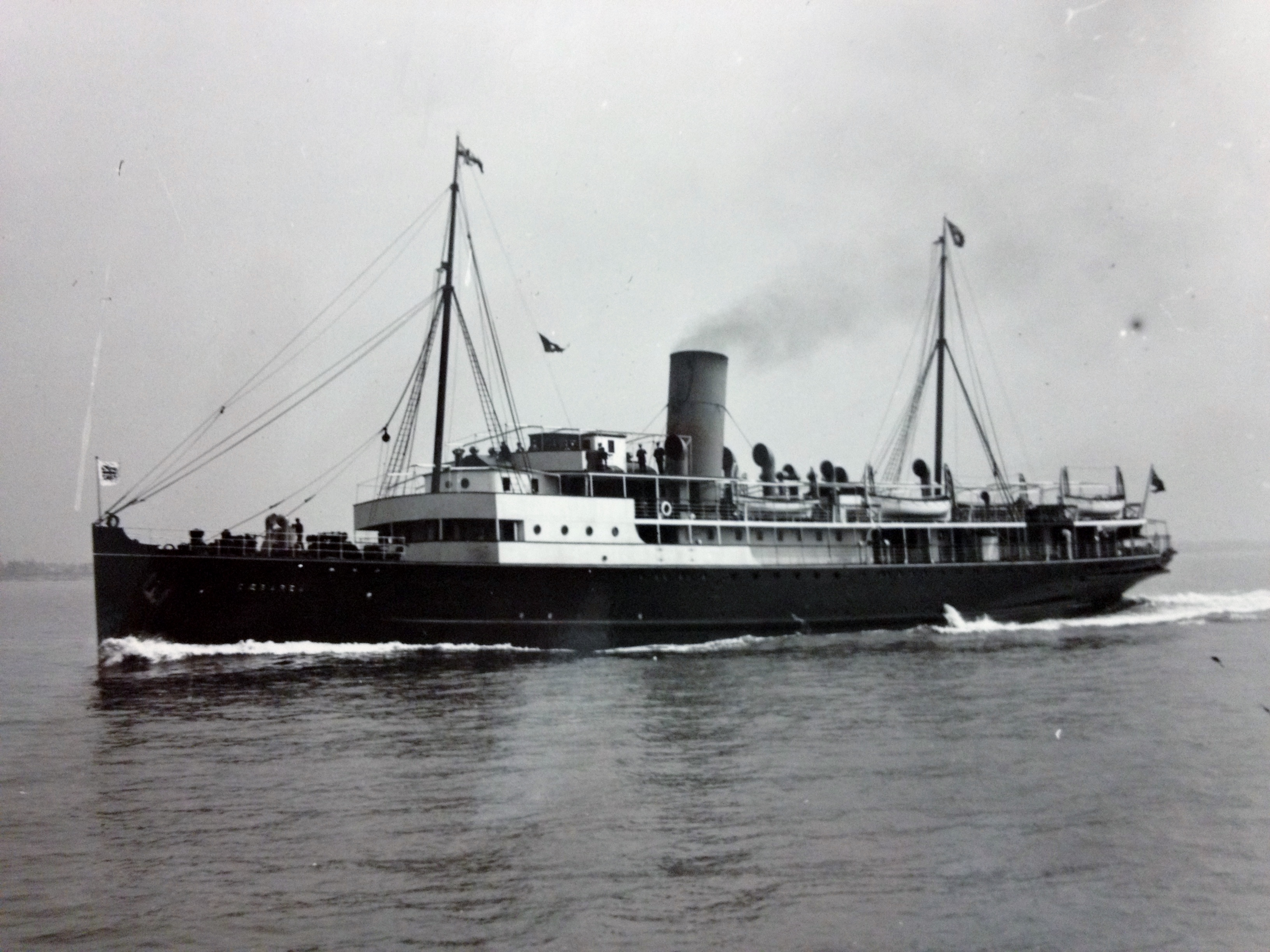
SS Caesarea

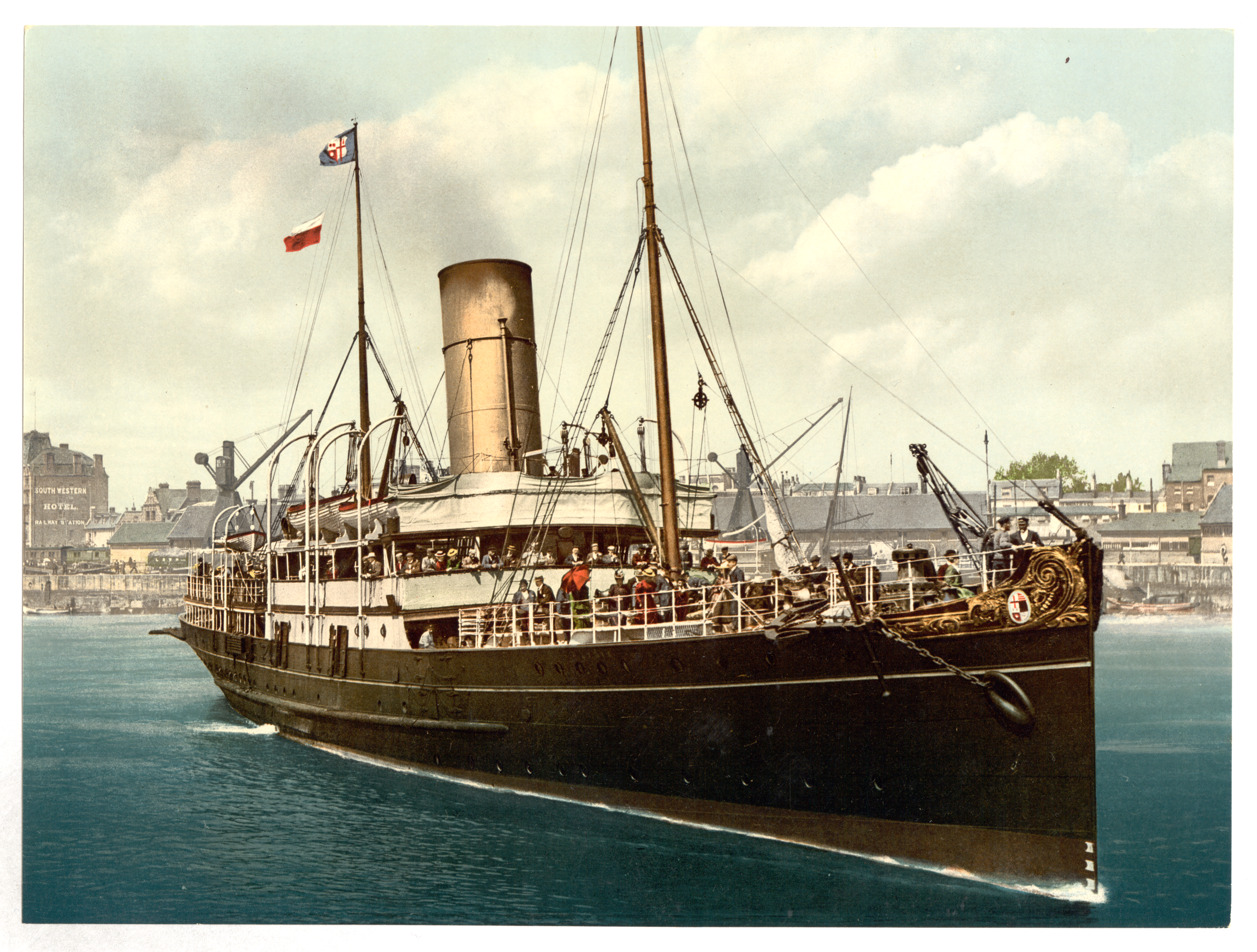
SS Lydia

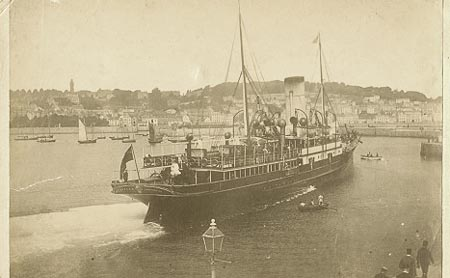
SS Stella

This article describes the shipping services of the London and South Western Railway and the vessels employed.

The London and South Western Railway (LSWR) started out as the London and Southampton Railway in 1838, with the object of linking the port facilities at Southampton with the capital, as well as the other ordinary business of a railway.

With the network extended to Portsmouth and Weymouth, it also developed a shipping business to the Isle of Wight, to the Channel Islands and to France.

== Lymington services ==
The LSWR reached Lymington in July 1858. The town's commercial activity was declining, but an independent ferry operator provided services from Lymington to the Isle of Wight. This became the Solent Sea Steam Packet Company. The railway line originally terminated at what is now Lymington Town station, but silting in the Lymington River made berthing there increasingly difficult, and the LSWR extended the line to the present Lymington Pier station on 19 September 1860.

Effective from 1 July 1884, the LSWR bought out the Solent Steam Packet Company's fleet of two paddle steamers, Solent and Mayflower, four horse and cargo boats, and other boats and property, paying £2,750.

The original Solent pre-dated the arrival of the railway at Lymington, having been built in 1841. In 1858, Red Lion (built 1856) was added to the SSPC fleet to handle additional traffic brought by the railway, and a second Solent replaced the first on 3 November 1863.

Mayflower joined the fleet on 6 July 1866 had been built in Newcastle; she was tastefully fitted and comfortable. As well as plying to Yarmouth, she made excursion runs to Bournemouth, but was disposed of after 1878.

A new paddle steamer, Lymington, entered service on 9 May 1893; she cost £6,000, having been built at the Northam Iron Works, Southampton. She was 120 feet (37 m) long.

The second Solent was becoming life expired at the end of the century, and in December 1899 the LSWR ordered a new paddle steamer from Mordey, Carney and Co of Southampton; the purchase price was to be £8,300. The builders evidently encountered difficulties, and when she was delivered in January 1901 she was found not to be compliant with the contract. Acceptance was refused, and after negotiation, Mordey, Carney offered to build a compliant vessel for £9,000; this proposal was accepted. The third Solent was handed over on 14 October 1901, the previous (second) vessel of the same name being sold for scrap in June 1901 for £225.

The Mayflower was sold for scrap in June 1905, realising £50.

A combined tug and cargo boat named Carrier was purchased from J Power on 6 February 1906. A 36-ton twin screw vessel, she had a wide beam providing a large deck for carrying motor cars, as the route was becoming a popular means of getting to the Island.

== Fleet ==
An incomplete list of LSWR ships:

Ship	Launched	Tonnage (GRT)	Notes and references
Ada	1905	529	Built by Gourlay Brothers Dundee. Scrapped in 1934.
Alberta	1900	1,236	Sold in 1930 to Greece.
Alice	1857	635	Purchased in 1869 from the Caledonian Railway, hulked in 1887.
Alliance	1855	400	Scrapped in 1900.
Alma	1894	1,145	Sold in 1912 to Eastern Shipping Co Ltd.
Ardena	1915	1,092	Ex-HMS Peony, purchased in 1919 and renamed Ardena. Sold in 1934 to Greece.
Atalanta	1907	550	Sold to the Great Western Railway in 1910
Bertha	1905	528	Built by Gourlay Brothers Dundee. Sold in 1933 to Metal Industries Ltd, Rosyth and employed as a salvage vessel raising the German fleet at Scapa Flow.
Brittany	1864		Scrapped in 1900
Brittany	1910	618	Purchased from the London, Brighton and South Coast Railway in 1912. Renamed Aldershot in 1933. Sold in 1936 to Italy, renamed Hercules.
Cæsarea	1867	275	Collided with Strathesk and sank off Cap La Hougue, Manche, France on 27 June 1884.
Caesarea	1910	1,505	Sold in 1928 to Isle of Man Steam Packet Company, renamed Manx Maid.
Cherbourg	1873		Scrapped in 1930
Columbia	1894	1,178	Sold in 1912 to Spain, renamed Sitges.
Courrier	1847	255	Scrapped in 1885.
Diana	1876	745	Wrecked at St Malo in 1895.
Dora	1889	813	Sold in 1901 to the Isle of Man Steam Packet Company. Renamed Douglas, the third IoMSPCo ship to bear that name.
Ella	1881	820	Sold in 1913 to the Shipping Federation.
Express	1847	256	Wrecked in 1859.
Fannie	1859	635	Purchased in 1869 from the Caledonian Railway. Scrapped in 1880.
Frederica	1890	1,059	Sold in 1911 to Turkey, renamed Neylofer.
Guernsey	1874		Wrecked in 1915 off French coast.
Hantonia	1911	1,560	Scrapped in 1952.
Havre	1856	372	Wrecked in 1875.
Hilda	1882	820	Wrecked in 1905 near St Malo with the loss of 105 lives.
Honfleur	1874		Sold in 1911.
Laura	1885	641	Sold to the Bahamas in 1927 and renamed City of Nassau.
Lorina	1918	1,504	Bombed at Dunkirk in 1940.
Lydia	1890	1,059	Sold in 1920 to T Sales Ltd.
Lymington	1893	204	
Mayflower	1866	69	Purchased from the Solent Steam Packet Company in July 1884. Scrapped 1910
Normandy	1863	600	Collided with the steamship Mary and sank on 17 March 1870 with the loss of 30 lives.
Normandy	1910	618	Purchased in 1912 from the London, Brighton and South Coast Railway. Torpedoed on 25 January 1918 and sunk off Cape La Hague.
Normannia	1911	1,567	Bombed and sunk at Dunkirk in 1940.
Princess Ena	1906	1,198	Requisitioned in 1915 and converted to a Q-ship. Returned postwar. Caught fire in 1935 off Jersey and wrecked.
Sarnia	1910	1,498	Torpedoed in 1918 at Alexandria and sunk.
Solent	1863	61	Purchased from the Solent Steam Packet Company in July 1884. Scrapped 1901.
Solent	1902	161	
South Western	1843	204	Sold in 1863.
South Western	1874	657	Torpedoed and sunk in 1918 with the loss of 24 lives.
Southampton	1860	585	Sold in 1897 for scrap.
Stella	1890	1,059	Wrecked in 1899 off the Channel Islands with the loss of over 100 lives.
Ulrica	1895	383	Built in 1895 as Granuaile. Acquired in 1917. Passed to the Southern Railway in 1923 and scrapped in 1928
Vera	1898	1,136	Scrapped in 1933
Victoria	1896	709	Sold in 1919 to Turkey, later sold to Greek owners. Scrapped in 1937.
Waverley	1865	593	Purchased in 1868 from the North British Railway. Wrecked in 1873.
Wolf	1862	731	Purchased in 1871. Sold in 1896 for use as a hospital ship.
Wonder	1844	250	Scrapped in 1873.

The company also operated a number of ships on the Isle of Wight service from Portsmouth to Ryde jointly with the London, Brighton and South Coast Railway.

Ship	Launched	Tonnage (GRT)	Notes and references
Duchess of Albany	1889	256	Scrapped in 1928.
Duchess of Connaught	1884	342	Scrapped in 1910.
Duchess of Edinburgh	1884	342	Scrapped in 1910.
Duchess of Fife	1899	443	Scrapped in November 1929 at Bolnes.
Duchess of Kent	1897	399	Sold to New Medway Steam Packet Co Ltd in 1933 and renamed Clacton Queen. Sold to Mersey & Blackpool Steamship Co Ltd in November 1935 and renamed Jubilee Queen. Sold to Jubilee Shipping Co and then S B Kelly in July 1936. Scrapped in June 1937 at Barrow in Furness.
Duchess of Norfolk	1911	381	Requisitioned by Royal Navy in 1919 as HMS Duchess of Norfolk. Returned to owners in 1920. Sold in 1937 to Cosens & Co Ltd, renamed Embassy. Requisitioned by Royal Navy in 1939 as HMS Ambassador. Returned to owners in 1945, renamed Embassy. Scrapped in 1967 at Boom, Belgium.
Duchess of Richmond	1910	354	Struck a mine on 28 June 1919 and sank.
Princess Margaret	1893	260	
Victoria	1881	366	Scrapped in 1900 at Bolness.
