= SS Granuaile =

SS Granuaile is the name of the following ships:

- SS Granuaile (1895), scrapped 1928
- SS Granuaile (1948), scrapped 1970

== See also ==
- Granuaile
