= SS Ada =

SS Ada is the name of the following ships:

- SS Ada (1881), built in 1881 as SS Amalfi, renamed SS Ada in 1911, sunk by SM U-61 on 9 June 1917
- SS Ada (1905), scrapped in 1934

== See also ==
- Ada (disambiguation)
- SS Ada Hancock
