= SS Bertha (1905) =

Cargo vessel operated by London and South Western Railway

History
- Name: SS Bertha
- Operator: 1905–1923: London and South Western Railway; 1923–1933: Southern Railway
- Port of registry: (United Kingdom)
- Builder: Gourlay Brothers, Dundee
- Yard number: 219
- Launched: 9 November 1905
- Fate: Scrapped 1948

General characteristics
- Tonnage: 528 gross register tons (GRT)
- Length: 175.3 feet (53.4 m)
- Beam: 28.1 feet (8.6 m)
- Draught: 12.4 feet (3.8 m)

SS Bertha was a cargo vessel built for the London and South Western Railway in 1905.

== History ==
She was built by Gourlay Brothers in Dundee and launched on 9 November 1905 by Miss Key, daughter of one of the railway superintendents. She was the second of a pair of vessels ordered by the London and South Western Railway, the other being Ada. She was built for light cargo traffic between Southampton and the Channel Islands.

She was acquired by the Southern Railway in 1923.

She was sold in 1933 to Metal Industries, Limited of Rosyth and used as a salvage vessel in raising some members of the German Fleet scuttled in Scapa Flow.
