= British Rail Class 401 =

British electric train classification

SR 2-BIL British Rail Class 401
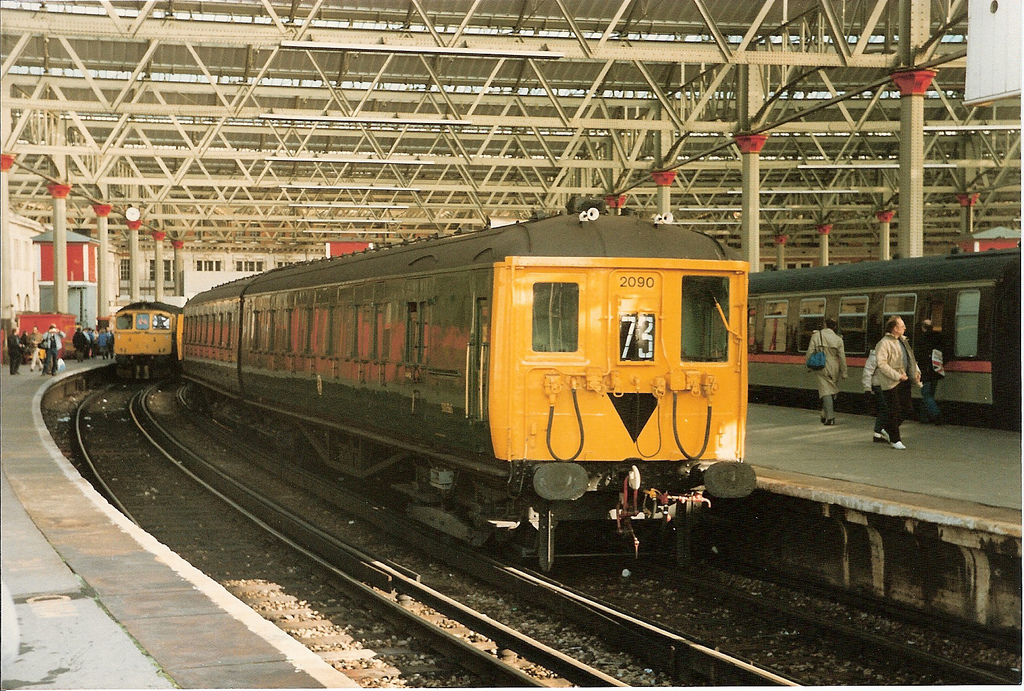
- 2090 at London Waterloo in 1986
- In service: 1935–1971
- Manufacturer: Southern Railway
- Order nos.: HO806; HO898; HO903; HO948; HO949
- Built at: Eastleigh railway works (bodies); Lancing Works (underframes)
- Constructed: 1935–1938
- Entered service: 1935
- Number built: 152 sets
- Number preserved: 1 set
- Number scrapped: 151 sets
- Formation: 2-car sets: DMBTL-DTCL
- Diagram: 2111 (DMBTL); 2115 (DMBTL); 2700 (DTCL); 2701 (DTCL)
- Design code: 2-BIL
- Fleet numbers: 2001–2152
- Capacity: 52S (MBSL) (Note: Originally 3rd class seating.); 24F/32S (DTCL)
- Operators: Southern Railway; British Railways

Specifications
- Car body construction: Steel-panelled wooden-framed body on steel underframe
- Train length: 129 ft 6 in (39.47 m)
- Car length: 62 ft 6 in (19.05 m)
- Width: 9 ft 3 in (2.82 m)
- Doors: Slam
- Maximum speed: 75 mph (121 km/h)
- Weight: 74 long tons 15 cwt (75.9 t) (total); 43 long tons 10 cwt (44.2 t) (MBSL); 31 long tons 5 cwt (31.8 t) (DTCL)
- Traction motors: 2 × MV339; 2 × EE507C (MV339 replacements); 2 × EE339 (as built)
- Power output: 2x 275 hp (205 kW) (as built); 550 hp (410 kW) (total, as built); 2 x 250 hp (186 kW) (replacement); 500 hp (373 kW) (total, replacement)
- Electric system: 750 V DC Third rail
- Current collection: Contact shoe
- UIC classification: Bo′2′+2′2′
- Braking system: Automatic air
- Coupling system: Screw
- Multiple working: SR Standard system (1936 Type)
- Track gauge: 4 ft 8 1/2 in (1,435 mm)

The Southern Railway (SR) gave the designation 2-BIL to the DC third rail electric multiple units built during the 1930s to work long-distance semi-fast services on the newly electrified lines from London to Eastbourne, Portsmouth and Reading. This type of unit survived long enough in British Rail ownership to be allocated TOPS Class 401.

== Construction ==
The 2-BIL units (2-car Bi-Lavatory stock) were so-called because each set had two lavatories, one in each car. They were built in four batches, each for service on newly electrified lines:

Units	Built	Intended Use
2001–2010	1935	London to Eastbourne
2011–2048	1936	London Waterloo to Alton and Portsmouth slow services
2049–2116	1937	Portsmouth to Bognor Regis
2117–2152	1938	London Waterloo to Reading

The different batches were broadly similar, though in the first one, the driving motor brake car had a smaller brake compartment and seven full compartments, rather than six-and-a-half in the later batches.

Several of the cars were destroyed in World War II at various points on the system. Some unit numbers were withdrawn, while others received a single replacement car from the small batch of postwar all-steel 2-HAL units which were built as replacements.

== Formations ==
The first two batches of 2-BIL stock were subject to the EMU renumbering scheme implemented during January and February 1937. The renumbering of these units, and the original formations of all 2-BIL units, are set out in the table below (*Unit 1890 was renumbered 1900 in January 1936):

Units (pre-1937)	Units (post-1937)	DMBT	DTC
1890 / 1900*	2010	10567	12101
1891–1899	2001–2009	10568 to 10576	12102 to 12110
1901–1920	2011–2030	10577 to 10596	12034 to 12053
1954–1971	2031–2048	10597 to 10614	12054 to 12071
-	2049–2077	10615 to 10643	12072 to 12100
-	2078–2152	10644 to 10718	12111 to 12185

The first ten 2-BIL units (2001 to 2010) had an earlier form of multiple unit control. They were compatible with the 4-LAV units of the same era, but not with the remainder of the 2-BIL sets. They normally operating from Brighton, where the 4-LAV were also based, on local services. The remaining sets spent their lives on the services for which they were constructed, although they were fully mixed in operation, and it was common for units to be exchanged between areas of operation even within a day's normal work. Commuter services into London Waterloo, Victoria and London Bridge found them typically marshalled up to 8-car units.

An unusual feature of their operation in the 1950s and 1960s was that there were about 30 more diagrams for these units than sets actually existed, while for the subsequent 2-HAL units (Class 402) there were more than 30 spare units, so a significant number of the daily 2-BIL diagrams were operated by the latter units, typically marshalled together as one of the sets in a full 8-car formation.

== 7-TC ==
In 1963, a 7-coach trailer set was formed by placing five former 4-SUB trailer cars between the two driving cars from unit 2006. The set was intended for use on the Oxted line, where it was hauled by diesel locomotives.

The motors from former DMBS car number 10573 were removed, and the whole set was re-wired to enable the hauling diesel locomotive to provide the electric train heating. Six out of nine compartments of one of the 4-Sub Trailer Second cars (number 11485) were refitted as first class compartments, thereby making it a Trailer Composite.

The set was originally numbered 900 in the old hauled carriage set number series, but this was amended in February 1966 to 701 in the new series for trailer control units. Despite this, and its designation as 7-TC (7-car Trailer Control stock), it was not a real trailer control unit in that a locomotive could not be operated remotely from the unit's driving cars.

The unit was stored from December 1967 and then withdrawn in April 1969. However, while the two driving cars were scrapped the following year, all five trailers were reused in other units. Four returned to 4-SUB formations, but 11485 underwent a further conversion, this time to a 4EPB Trailer Second, and was renumbered 15084. Full details of the 7-TC formation, the origin of the individual cars and their subsequent disposal are set out in the table below:

Carriage Number	Carriage Type	Former Unit	Re-use/Disposal
10573	TBS (ex-DMBS)	2-BIL 2006	Scrapped (1970)
10351	TS	4-SUB 4328	4-SUB 4132
10353	TS	4-SUB 4352	4-SUB 4364
11485	TC (ex-TS)	4-SUB 4115	4-EPB 5115 (as TS 15084)
10349	TS	4-SUB 4346	4-SUB 4132
10346	TS	4-SUB 4329	4-SUB 4131
12107	TC (ex-DTC)	2-BIL 2006	Scrapped (1970)

== Accidents and incidents ==
- On 1 August 1962, unit No.2088 was derailed at Barnham, West Sussex when a set of points moved under it due to an electrical fault. Thirty-eight people were injured.

== Withdrawal ==
After withdrawal in 1971, various 2-BIL units in company with 2-HAL units were noted at Stratford in east London destined for scrapping by Kings of Norwich, or being hauled west for scrapping in the Newport area.

== Preservation ==
Only one 2-BIL unit has survived into preservation, namely number 2090, formed of carriages 10656 and 12123, which is in the care of the National Railway Museum, York. This unit is also the only pre-war main line EMU in existence, which is still in original formation. A Class 503, which was kept at the Locomotive Storage Ltd facility in Margate, has 2 carriages slated for scrap [9]

Unit number (current in bold)		DMBTK	DTCK	Built	Livery	Location
**2090**	-	10656	12123	1937 Eastleigh	BR(S) Malachite Green	National Railway Museum

== Model railways ==
In 2013, Hornby Railways introduced a DCC-ready OO gauge model of the 2-BIL, with versions in both SR green and BR green.

In 2010, Electrifying Trains produced a BR green 2-BIL model in O gauge.
