= PS Lymington =

Ship built in 1893

History
- Name: PS Lymington
- Operator: 1893–1923: London and South Western Railway; 1923–1929: Southern Railway
- Port of registry: (United Kingdom)
- Builder: Day, Summers and Company, Southampton
- Cost: £6,000
- Launched: 6 April 1893

General characteristics
- Tonnage: 130 gross register tons (GRT)
- Length: 120.2 feet (36.6 m)
- Beam: 18.1 feet (5.5 m)
- Draught: 7.7 feet (2.3 m)

PS Lymington was a passenger vessel built for the London and South Western Railway in 1893.

== History ==
She was built by Day, Summers and Company in Southampton and launched on 6 April 1893.

She cost £6,000 (equivalent to £670,000 in 2025) and was 120 feet (37 m) long. and was used for the Yarmouth to Lymington ferry service.

She was acquired by the Southern Railway in 1923.

She was disposed of is 1929 and converted into a houseboat at Yarmouth and renamed Glengarry. Later she was used as the Norwich Sea Cadets’ training vessel Lord Nelson.
