= British Rail Class 402 =

Class of British electric rail cars

Southern Railway 2-HAL British Rail Class 402
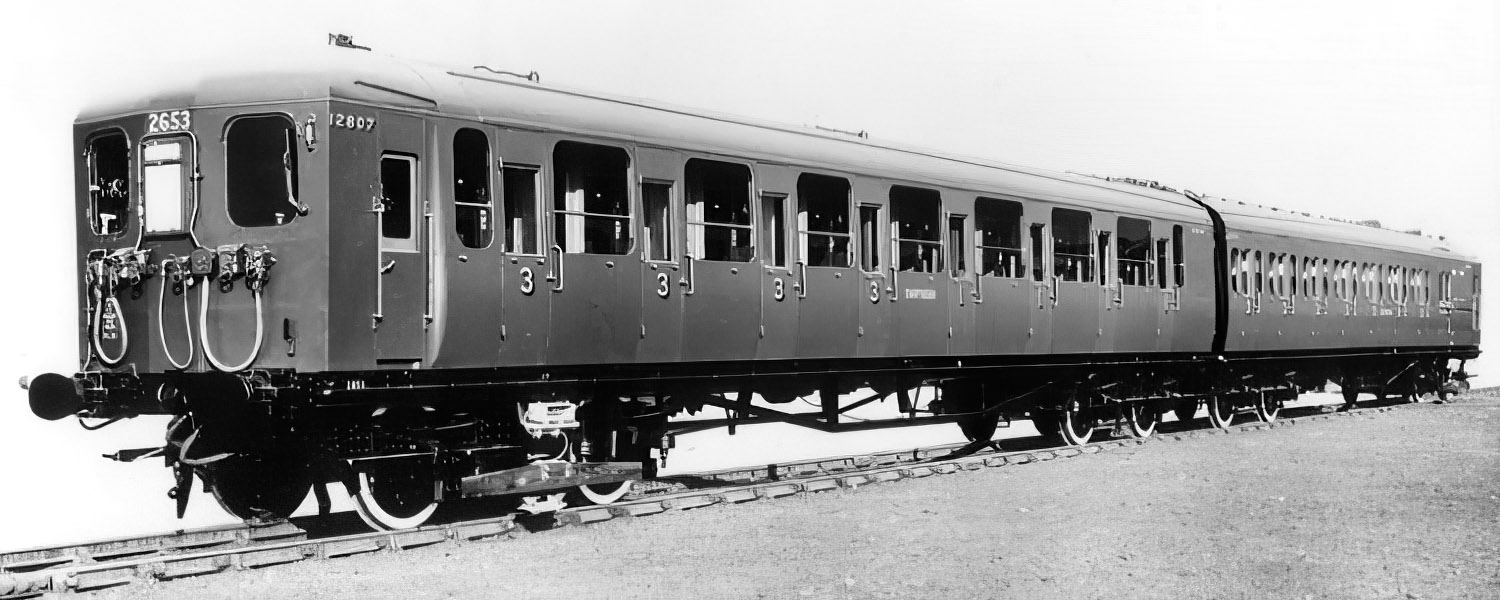
- Southern Railway publicity photograph 1938
- In service: 1939–1971
- Manufacturer: Eastleigh Works, frames from Lancing
- Replaced: Steam locomotives and carriages
- Constructed: 1938–1939, 1948, 1955
- Number built: 100
- Number scrapped: All
- Formation: DMBT-DTC
- Capacity: 32 first class (later 24), 102 third class
- Operators: Southern Railway and British Railways

Specifications
- Train length: 129 ft 6 in (39.47 m)
- Car length: 62 ft 6 in (19.05 m)
- Width: 9 ft 2 in (2.79 m)
- Maximum speed: 75 mph (121 km/h)
- Weight: 76 long tons (77 t; 85 short tons)
- Traction motors: Two
- Power output: 2 x 275 hp (205 kW) total = 550 hp (410 kW)
- Electric system(s): 750 V DC Third rail
- Current collection: Contact shoe
- UIC classification: Bo′2′+2′2′
- Braking system(s): Electro-pneumatic Air
- Coupling system: Screw-link
- Track gauge: 4 ft 8 1/2 in (1,435 mm) standard gauge

The Southern Railway (SR) gave the designation 2-HAL to the electric multiple-unit passenger trains built during the late 1930s to work long-distance semi-fast services on the newly electrified lines from London Victoria to Maidstone and Gillingham (Kent). This type of unit survived long enough in British Rail ownership to be allocated TOPS Class 402.

== Construction ==
A development of the earlier 2-BIL units, the 2-HAL units (2-car Half Lavatory stock) were so-called because only one car in each unit had a lavatory. They were built in three batches:

Units	Built	Intended Use
2601–2677	1938	London Victoria to Maidstone and Gillingham
2677–2692	1939	London Waterloo to Aldershot and Reading
2693–2699	1948	Post-World War II additional units
2700	1955	Accident replacement unit

The handful of post-war units were of completely different appearance, of all-steel construction, and looked very like the standard 4-SUB units being built at the same time, with flat ends, whereas the main 2-HAL units had the domed end appearance of the first 10 prototype "Queen Mary" 4-SUB units.

In the early 1960s the Eastern Division was fully changed over to EP-braked electric stock, and the 2-HAL units operating from Victoria to Maidstone/Gillingham etc. were removed to the Central and Western Divisions, being replaced by the large new build of 2-HAP units. The units then remained in service on these divisions until replaced at the end of their life by new 4-VEP units.

== Formations ==
The original formations of these units are set out in the table below:

Unit Numbers	DMBT	DTC
2601–2646	10719 to 10764	12186 to 12231
2647–2699	10765 to 10817	12801 to 12853
2700	12664 (ex 4-SUB 4590)	12855 (new build)

== Departmental service ==
=== De-icing units ===
In 1967, three units were converted for de-icing the 3rd rail and were renumbered 001 - 003. These units operated from depots at Eastleigh and Bournemouth.

=== Stores units ===
In 1970, two units were converted for use transporting stores between depots. Renumbered 022 and 023 these units linked Eastleigh Works and other depots on the Southern Region and followed a set route on a weekly schedule. Unit 022 was allocated to Slade Green and served Stewarts Lane, Hither Green, Ashford, Ramsgate and Slade Green while Unit 023 was allocated to Brighton and served Wimbledon, Selhurst, New Cross Gate, Brighton and Fratton.

=== 2-PAN ===
In 1971, six units were converted for use conveying parcels and newspaper traffic. They were renumbered 061-066 and designated 2-PAN (2-car Parcels and Newspapers stock), reusing the PAN code originally allocated to 6-PAN (Pantry) stock. Their life was not extended by long; within two years, all had been withdrawn.

== Withdrawal ==
After withdrawal in 1971, various 2-HAL units in company with 2-BIL units were noted at Stratford in east London destined for scrapping by Kings of Norwich, or being hauled west for scrapping in the Newport area.
