= SS Ada (1905) =

History
- Name: SS Ada
- Operator: 1905–1923: London and South Western Railway; 1923–1934: Southern Railway
- Port of registry: (United Kingdom)
- Builder: Gourlay Brothers, Dundee
- Yard number: 216
- Launched: 4 April 1905
- Out of service: 1934
- Fate: Scrapped 1934

General characteristics
- Tonnage: 529 gross register tons (GRT)
- Length: 175.3 feet (53.4 m)
- Beam: 28.1 feet (8.6 m)
- Draught: 12.4 feet (3.8 m)
- Speed: 12 knots

SS Ada was a cargo vessel built for the London and South Western Railway in 1905.

== History ==
The SS Ada was built by Gourlay Brothers in Dundee and launched on 4 April 1905 by Miss Drummond. She was launched only 47 days after the keel was laid, without overtime being worked, and represented a record for the Gourlay shipyard. She was the first of a pair of ships ordered by the London and South Western Railway, the other being Bertha. She was built for light cargo traffic between Southampton and the Channel Islands.

She was acquired by the Southern Railway in 1923.

She was scrapped in 1934.
