= SS Alma (1894) =

History
- Name: 1894–1917: SS Alma; 1917–1922: SS Shokiku Maru No. 2; 1922–1924: SS Shogiku Maru
- Operator: 1894–1912: London and South Western Railway; 1912–1916: Eastern Shipping Company, Penang; 1916–1917: P N Heath, Shanghai; 1917–1920: M Matsou and U Matsumoto, Japan; 1920–1924: Hongo Ikichiro, Amiro
- Port of registry: (United Kingdom)
- Builder: J and G Thomson, Clydebank
- Yard number: 275
- Launched: 4 October 1894
- Fate: Wrecked 17 June 1924

General characteristics
- Tonnage: 1,145 gross register tons (GRT)
- Length: 270.7 feet (82.5 m)
- Beam: 34 feet (10 m)
- Draught: 14.6 feet (4.5 m)

SS Alma was a passenger vessel built for the London and South Western Railway in 1894.

== History ==
The ship was built by J and G Thomson of Clydebank and launched on 4 October 1894 by Evelyn Donaldson, Cochno House, Duntocher. She was provided with accommodation for 100 first-class passengers in two-berth rooms and 50 second-class passengers at the after end of the vessel in large cabins. The first-class cabins were located near the centre of the vessel where the pitching motion is least. Bilge keels were also fitted to dispense with rolling motion. She was one of an order for two ships, the other being Columbia.

In 1899 she picked up Thomas Slattery and James Montague, seamen from the Boadicea of Bridgwater which had foundered off Lundy on 13 January 1899. With two others they had built a raft, and spent three hours in the stormy sea, but the two others were washed off.

In she was sold to the Eastern Shipping Company, Penang. In 1916 she was purchased by P N Heath, Shanghai who sold her in 1917 to M Matsou and U Matsumoto, Japan who renamed her Shokiku Maru No. 2. In 1920 she was sold to Hongo Ikichiro, Amiro and she was renamed Shogiku Maru in 1922. She was wrecked on 17 June 1924 on the west coast of Sakhalin.
