= SS Columbia (1894) =

British passenger ship, later French troopship, sunk in WWI

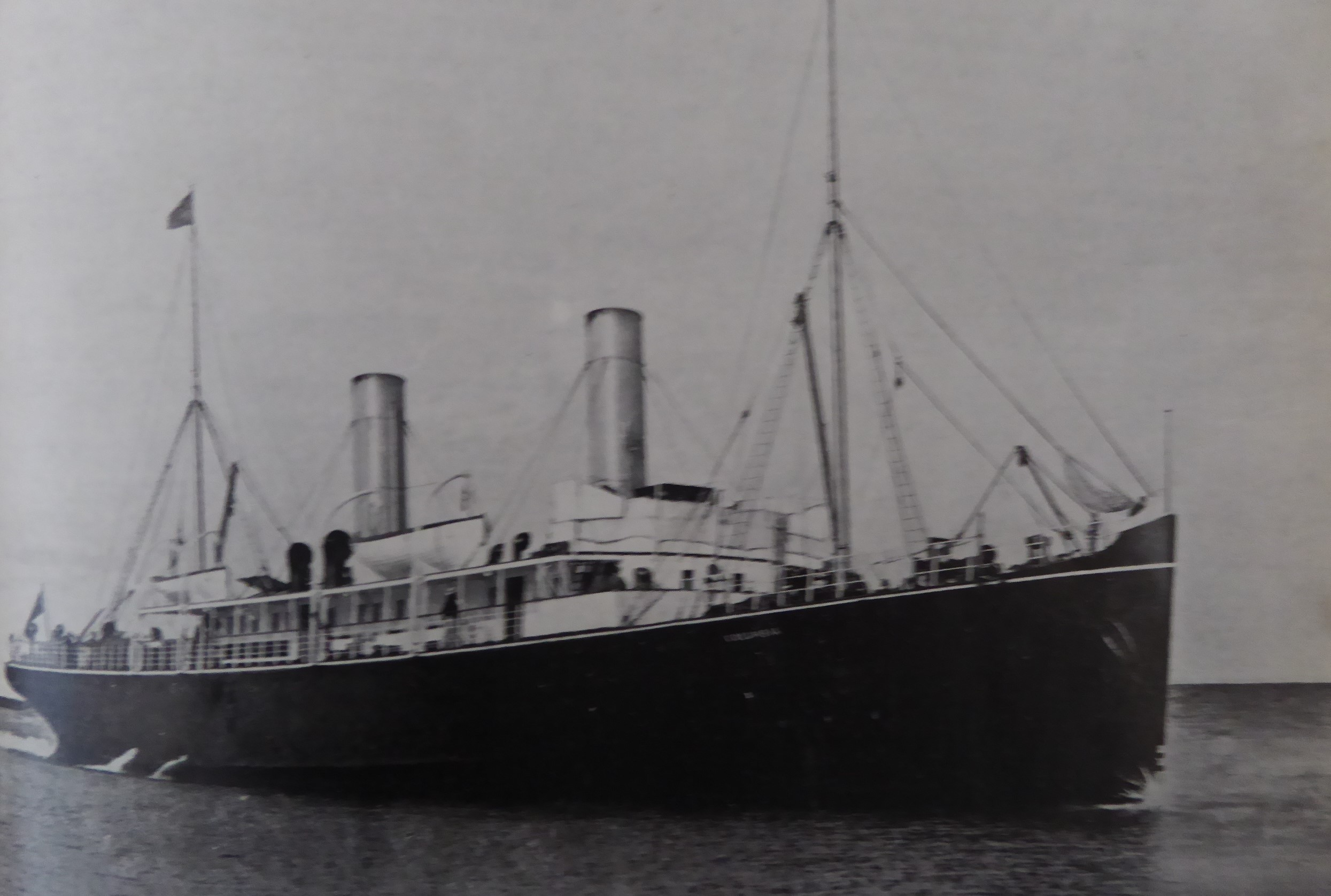

History

United Kingdom, France
- Name: 1894–1912: SS Columbia; 1912–1915: SS Sitges; 1915–1918: SS Corse
- Operator: 1894–1912: London and South Western Railway; 1912–1915: J.J. Sitges Freres, Alicante; 1915–1918: French Navy
- Port of registry: (United Kingdom)
- Builder: J and G Thomson, Clydebank
- Yard number: 274
- Launched: 4 September 1894
- Fate: Torpedoed and sunk 24 January 1918

General characteristics
- Type: Passenger vessel/troopship
- Tonnage: 1,145 gross register tons (GRT)
- Length: 270.7 feet (82.5 m)
- Beam: 34 feet (10 m)
- Draught: 14.6 feet (4.5 m)

SS Columbia was a passenger vessel built for the London and South Western Railway in 1894.

== History ==
The ship was built by J and G Thomson of Clydebank and launched on 4 September 1894, sponsored by a Miss Alderson. Columbia was one of an order for two ships, the other being Alma. She was intended for the fast passenger mail service operated by the railway company between Southampton and Le Havre.

On 13 February 1898, Columbia collided with the French fishing-smack Gazelle. Of the crew of eight French fishermen, only two were rescued.

In 1912, Columbia was sold to J. J. Sitges Freres of Alicante, Spain, and renamed Sitges. He was acquired by the French Navy in 1915 for World War I service as a troopship and renamed 'Corse'. Corse was sunk on 24 January 1918 in the Mediterranean Sea off La Ciotat, Bouches-du-Rhône, France, by the Imperial German Navy submarine SM UC-67. Her crew survived.
