= SS Vera (1898) =

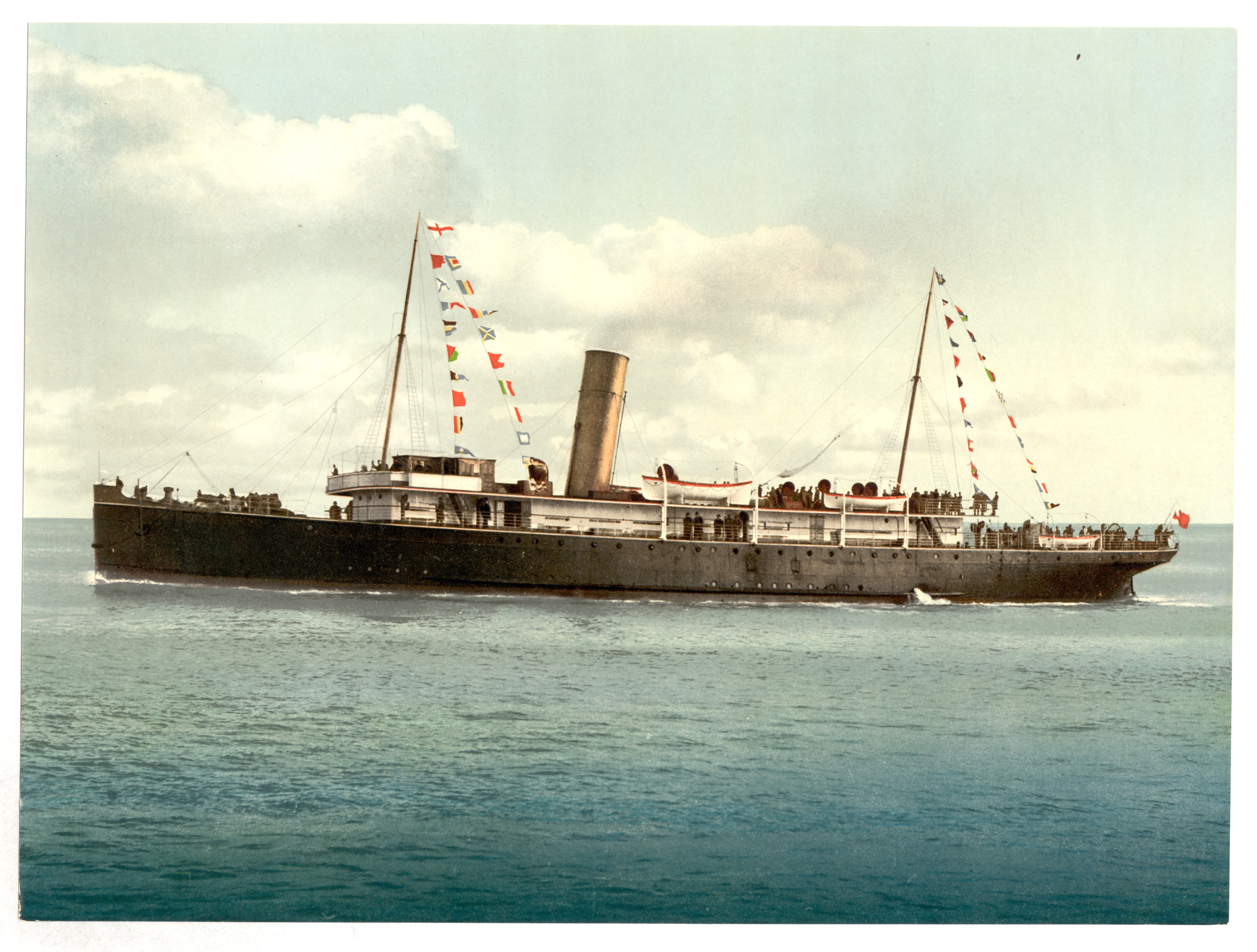

History
- Name: SS Vera
- Operator: 1898–1923: London and South Western Railway; 1923–1933: Southern Railway
- Port of registry: (United Kingdom)
- Builder: Clydebank Engineering and Shipbuilding Company
- Yard number: 330
- Launched: 4 July 1898
- Out of service: 1933
- Fate: Scrapped 9 November 1933

General characteristics
- Tonnage: 1,136 gross register tons (GRT)
- Length: 270 feet (82 m)
- Beam: 35.1 feet (10.7 m)

SS Vera was a passenger vessel built for the London and South Western Railway in 1898.

== History ==
She was built by the Clydebank Engineering and Shipbuilding Company and launched on 4 July 1898 by Mrs Dixon, the wife of the marine superintendent of the London and South Western Railway. She was deployed on services between Southampton, the Channel Islands and the north coast of France. She had accommodation for 80 first-class passengers in cabins, and an additional 80 first-class passengers in Pullman car style state rooms. Provision was also made for 50 second-class passengers in the after-end of the vessel in large cabins.

On 15 July 1905 she stranded herself on the Black Rock, at Yarmouth off the Isle of Wight.

She was acquired by the Southern Railway in 1923.

She was disposed in 1933.
