= PS Solent (1863) =

History
- Name: PS Solent
- Operator: 1863–1884: Solent Steam Packet Company; 1884–1901: London and South Western Railway
- Port of registry: (United Kingdom)
- Builder: George Inman, Lymington
- Launched: 1 May 1863
- Out of service: 1901
- Fate: Scrapped

General characteristics
- Tonnage: 61 gross register tons (GRT)
- Length: 94 feet (29 m)
- Beam: 15.6 feet (4.8 m)
- Draught: 7.1 feet (2.2 m)
- Propulsion: Engines by J. Hodgkinson of Southampton
- Speed: 12 knots

PS Solent was a passenger vessel built for the Solent Steam Packet Company in 1863.

== History ==
She was built by George Inman of Lymington and launched on 1 May 1863. She went to Southampton in June 1863 for the fitting of her engines by J. Hodgkinson. She undertook her trial trip on 29 October 1863 from Lymington to Stokes Bay.

She was acquired by the London and South Western Railway in 1884.

She was disposed of around 1901.
