= SS Lorina =

History
- Name: TSS Lorina
- Operator: 1918–1923: London and South Western Railway; 1923–1940: Southern Railway
- Port of registry: (United Kingdom)
- Builder: William Denny and Brothers, Dumbarton
- Yard number: 1021
- Launched: 12 August 1918
- Fate: Bombed and sunk 29 May 1940

General characteristics
- Tonnage: 1,457 gross register tons (GRT)
- Length: 291.3 feet (88.8 m)
- Beam: 36.1 feet (11.0 m)

TSS Lorina was a passenger vessel built for the London and South Western Railway in 1918.

== History ==
She was built by William Denny and Brothers and launched on 12 August 1918 and later converted into a troopship by Caledon Shipyards in Dundee. After an initial role as a troop ship, the railway company deployed her in March 1920 as a passenger ferry to and from the Channel Islands.

In 1923, the TSS Lorina was acquired by the Southern Railway. On 27 August 1927 when leaving Guernsey, she collided with a motor fishing boat in St Peter Port. The fishing boat sank within two minutes and one of the fishermen drowned. On 23 October 1935 she struck the Platte Rock near St Helier harbour but there were no casualties.

Lorina was ordered to sail from Southampton to Dover in 1940 after the start of Operation Dynamo, the Dunkirk evacuation. On 29 May 1940 she was dive-bombed by Luftwaffe aircraft while off Dunkirk and sank with the loss of eight crew. Two days later the wreck was boarded by men from the destroyer HMS Winchelsea who lowered undamaged lifeboats from the Lorina's davits and used them to ferry troops from the beaches.
