= PS Mayflower (1866) =

History
- Name: PS Mayflower
- Operator: 1866–1884: Solent Steam Packet Company; 1884–1905: London and South Western Railway
- Port of registry: (United Kingdom)
- Builder: Marshall Brothers, Newcastle
- Launched: 1866
- Out of service: 1912
- Fate: Scrapped 1912

General characteristics
- Tonnage: 69 gross register tons (GRT)
- Length: 98.3 feet (30.0 m)
- Beam: 15.7 feet (4.8 m)
- Draught: 6.8 feet (2.1 m)

PS Mayflower was a passenger vessel built for the Solent Steam Packet Company in 1866.

== History ==
She was built by Marshall Brothers in Newcastle and launched in 1866 and was used to expand the company services, offering a daily passage between Lymington and Portsmouth.

She was acquired by the London and South Western Railway in 1884.

In 1905 she was acquired by Joseph Constant in London and registered in Southampton. She was broken up in 1912.
