= SS Ardena =

History
- Name: 1915–1920: HMS Peony; 1920–1943: SS Ardena
- Operator: 1915–1920: Royal Navy; 1920–1923: London and South Western Railway; 1923–1934: Southern Railway; 1934–1942: Navigation Constantine Toyias, Piraeus; 1942–1943: German Navy
- Port of registry: (United Kingdom)
- Builder: A McMillan & Son, Dumbarton
- Yard number: 462
- Launched: 25 August 1915
- Fate: Mined and sunk 27 September 1943

General characteristics
- Tonnage: 1,092 gross register tons (GRT)
- Length: 250.1 feet (76.2 m)
- Beam: 33.1 feet (10.1 m)

SS Ardena was a minesweeper and escort vessel built as an Azalea-class sloop minesweeper for the British Royal Navy with the name HMS Peony in 1915.

== Design and construction ==
The Azalea-class was based on the previous Acacia-class, but with a heavier gun armament. (Note: Together with the following Arabis-class, Aubrietia-class and Anchusa-class, these classes were collectively known as Flower-class sloops.) They were designed at the start of the First World War as relatively fast minesweepers that could also carry out various miscellaneous duties in support of the fleet such as acting as dispatch vessels or carrying out towing operations, but as the war continued and the threat from German submarines grew, became increasingly involved in anti-submarine duties.

Peony was 262 ft 6 in (80.01 m) long overall and 250 ft (76.20 m) between perpendiculars, with a beam of 33 ft (10.06 m) and a draught of 11 ft (3.35 m). Displacement was 1,210 long tons (1,229 t) normal. Two cylindrical boilers fed steam to a triple expansion steam engine rated at 1,800 ihp (1,300 kW), giving a speed of 16.5 kn (19.0 mph; 30.6 km/h). The Azeleas had a main armament of two 4.7 inch (120 mm) or 4 inch (102 mm) guns, with two 3-pounder (47 mm) anti-aircraft guns also carried. Peony had a crew of 90 officers and other ranks.

Peony was ordered on 4 May 1915 from the Scottish shipbuilder Archibald McMillan & Son, and was built at their Dumbarton shipyard as Yard number 462. She was launched on 25 August 1915, and was completed on 27 October 1915.

== Service ==
Peony joined the Mediterranean Fleet after commissioning. In December 1915, the Royal Navy prepared to evacuate troops from the Dardanelles, with Peony serving as headquarters ship for General Julian Byng during the evacuation from Suvla Bay on the night of 18/19 December that year. In June 1916, Peony took part in a demonstration in Milo Bay to force the Greek Army to demobilise after Greece had allowed German forces to capture Fort Roupel and occupy much of eastern Macedonia without a fight.

By May 1917, Peony formed part of the Eastern Mediterranean Squadron, which by September, had become the Aegean Squadron. In May 1917, owing to a shortage of seaplane carriers to support anti-submarine operations in the southern Aegean, Peony was fitted to support the operation of three seaplanes. From mid-May to the end of June that year, she was based at Leros, using her seaplanes to search for hidden U-boat bases around the islands of the Aegean. Peony remained in the Aegean Sea into 1918, operating in the Smyrna area, and was undergoing boiler cleaning on 20 January 1918. In April 1918, she was based at Mudros, together with the seaplane carrier HMS Ark Royal (1914), with their seaplanes being mainly employed on anti-submarine duties. Peony was still based in the Aegean, supporting aircraft operations at the end of the war. In January 1919, she was listed as part of the 12th Sloop Flotilla, based at Malta.

== Civil use ==
Peony was sold to T. R. Sales on 20 August 1919, and was resold to the London and South Western Railway. In 1920, she was reconstructed as a passenger ferry by the Caledon Shipbuilding & Engineering Company at their Dundee yard, and was renamed Ardena, making her maiden civil voyage on 6 December 1920. Ardena was placed on the routes to Cherbourg and Caen which re-opened in July 1921. She was taken over by the Southern Railway in 1923 and remained until sold in July 1934.

She went to Navigation Constantine Toyias, Piraeus. On 18 April 1941, during a convoy escort, she collided with the Greek destroyer Leon followed by the explosion of two depth charges. As a result, the stern section of Leon was cut off and two officers were killed.

Ardena was sunk by the Luftwaffe in April 1941 and later raised by the Germans.

On 28 September 1943 she was sailing from Cephalonia to Greece with 840 Italian prisoners of war when she hit a mine off Argostoli and sank. 720 Italian prisoners of war were killed.
