= SS Granuaile (1895) =

History
- Name: 1895–1917: SS Granuaile; 1917–1926: SS Ulrica
- Operator: 1895–1915: Congested Districts Board of Ireland, Dublin; 1915–1916: Peter Morrison, Glasgow; 1916: R.E.V. James Ltd, Southampton; 1916–1923: London and South Western Railway; 1923–1928: Southern Railway
- Port of registry: (United Kingdom)
- Builder: Ailsa Shipbuilding Company
- Yard number: 49
- Launched: 12 February 1895
- Out of service: 1928
- Fate: Scrapped 1928

General characteristics
- Tonnage: 383 gross register tons (GRT)
- Length: 149.9 feet (45.7 m)
- Beam: 24.1 feet (7.3 m)

SS Granuaile was a cargo vessel built in 1895.

== History ==
She was built by the Ailsa Shipbuilding Company and launched on 12 February 1895 as the Granuaile. She undertook her trials on 23 March 1895 when she achieved the speed of 10.5 knots. Her engines were fitted by Muir and Houston.

She was acquired by the London and South Western Railway in 1916 and renamed Ulrica.

She was taken over by the Southern Railway in 1923. On 8 March 1923 she struck the Roustel Rock, off St Sampson’s Harbour, and took in water, but managed to make it into St Peter’s Port Harbour.

She remained until scrapped in 1928.
