= SS Laura (1885) =

History
- Name: 1885–1928: SS Laura; 1828–1937: SS City of Nassau
- Operator: 1885–1923: London and South Western Railway; 1923–1927: Southern Railway; 1927–1928: Bahamas Shipping Company, Nassau; 1928–1937: Florida Inter-Island Steam Ship Company
- Port of registry: (United Kingdom)
- Builder: Aitken and Mansel, Whiteinch
- Yard number: 132
- Launched: 20 March 1885
- Out of service: 1937
- Fate: Scrapped 1937

General characteristics
- Tonnage: 641 gross register tons (GRT)
- Length: 207 feet (63 m)
- Beam: 26.8 feet (8.2 m)
- Draught: 13.3 feet (4.1 m)
- Installed power: 200 hp

SS Laura was a passenger vessel built for the London and South Western Railway in 1885.

== History ==
The ship was built of Siemens Martin steel by the Aitken and Mansel of Whiteinch and launched on 20 March 1885 by Miss Alice Fleming of Eltham Kent. She had accommodation for about 150 passengers, exclusive of third class passengers.

On 27 January 1886 she was on a voyage from Southampton to St Malo when the bottom of her high-pressure cylinder blew out, scalding one of the firemen, and disabling the ship about 15 miles north of Guernsey. The tugs Rescue and Alert were sent from Guernsey to render her assistance.

In 1910, 21 miles south of the Needle’s lighthouse, she collided with the Norwegian ship Sophie, of Lavinia, bound from Caleta Buena for Hamburg loaded with nitrate. The Sophie was struck on the starboard quarter and started to flood.

In January 1911 she collided with her sister ship Lydia during a dense fog off the Needles and on 14 January 1914 the Hamburg-Amerika Company’s tender Ariadne collided with her.

She was taken over in 1923 by the Southern Railway. On 6 November 1925 she fractured her rudder on a trip from St Malo to Southampton. She was picked up by the steamer Magic Star and towed to the entrance of Southampton water.

She was sold to the Bahamas Shipping Company in 1927 in Nassau, and the Florida Inter-Island Steam Ship Company, Nassau in 1928 when she was renamed City of Nassau. She was scrapped in 1937.
