= Solent Sea Steam Packet Company =

Ferry operator

- Formerly: Solent Sea Steam Packet Company
- Industry: Ferry
- Founded: 1841
- Defunct: 1884
- Fate: Acquired by London and South Western Railway

The Solent Sea Steam Packet Company, later the Solent Steam Packet Company, operated ferry services between Lymington and Yarmouth on the Isle of Wight between 1841 and 1884.

== History ==
In early 1841, the company purchased Glasgow from the Lymington, Yarmouth, Cowes and Portsmouth Steam Packet Company, and after refitting, was deployed on the service between Lymington and Yarmouth, operating three or four passages a day.

In March 1841, the company entered into a contract with the Post Office for the conveyance of mail between Lymington and Yarmouth. By 18the next year, the company had acquired another vessel, Solent, which was running from Lymington to Yarmouth, Cowes, Ryde and Portsmouth.

In 1858, Red Lion was added to the fleet to handle additional traffic brought by the railway. The company changed its name to the Solent Steam Packet Company in 1861.

A second Solent replaced the first on 3 November 1863. Mayflower joined the fleet on 6 July 1866 had been built in Newcastle; she was tastefully fitted and comfortable. As well as plying to Yarmouth, she made excursion runs to Bournemouth, but was disposed of after 1878.

On 1 July 1884, the London and South Western Railway bought out the Solent Steam Packet Company's fleet of two paddle steamers, Solent and Mayflower, four horse and cargo boats, and other boats and property, paying £2,750 (equivalent to £295,454 in 2025).

=== Ships ===
The vessels operated by the Solent Sea Steam Packet Company were:

Ship	Launched	Tonnage (GRT)	Notes and references
PS Glasgow	1828	50	Built by John Wood, Port Glasgow in 1828. Lengthened in 1831. Acquired in 1841. Disposed of in 1852.
PS Solent	1841	61	Built by Summers, Groves and Day in 1841. Disposed on in 1864.
PS Red Lion	1856	54	Built by Thornburn and Alman in North Shields in 1856. Acquired in 1858. Disposed of in 1878 to Marshall of South Shields. Broken up in 1886.
PS Solent	1863	61	Built by George Inman, Lymington in 1863.
PS Mayflower	1866	69	Built by Marshall Brothers in Newcastle in 1866. She transferred to the London and South Western Railway in 1884 and was sold in 1905 and broken up in 1912.
