= SS Brittany (1910) =

History
- Name: Brittany (1910–1933); Aldershot (1933–1937); Hercules (1937–1941)
- Owner: London Brighton and South Coast Railway (1910–1912); London and South Western Railway (1912–1922); Southern Railway (1923–1936); D Tripcovich & Compagnie (1936–1941)
- Operator: London Brighton and South Coast Railway (1910–1912); London and South Western Railway (1912–1922); Southern Railway (1923–1936); Società Anonima di Navigazione Rimorchi e Salvataggi (1936–1941)
- Port of registry: (United Kingdom) Newhaven (1910–1912); (United Kingdom) Southampton (1912–1936); (Italy) Trieste (1936–1941)
- Route: Newhaven – Caen (1910–1912)
- Builder: Earle's Co Ltd, Hull
- Yard number: 572
- Launched: 9 July 1910
- Completed: August 1910
- Out of service: 24 November 1941
- Identification: UK Official Number 105657 (1910-36); Italian Official Number 404 (1936-41); Code Letters HRNC (1910-36); Code Letters IOMU (1936-41)
- Fate: Torpedoed and sunk, 24 November 1941

General characteristics
- Type: Passenger ferry (1910–1937); Salvage vessel (1937–1941)
- Tonnage: 631 GRT; 256 NRT
- Length: 192 ft (58.52 m)
- Beam: 29 ft 2 in (8.89 m)
- Depth: 14 ft 1 in (4.29 m)
- Installed power: 1 x triple expansion steam engine
- Speed: 12 knots (22 km/h)

Brittany was a 631 GRT passenger ferry built in 1910 for the London, Brighton and South Coast Railway. In 1912 she was sold to the London and South Western Railway, passing to the Southern Railway on 1 January 1923. She was renamed Aldershot in 1933. In 1937 she was sold to an Italian owner and renamed Hercules. On 24 November 1941, she was torpedoed and sunk by HMS Triumph.

== Description ==
The ship was built by Earle's, Kingston upon Hull. She was yard number 572 and was launched on 9 July 1910 with completion in August 1910. She had a GRT of 632 and a NRT of 256. The ship was 192 feet (58.52 m) long, with a beam of 29 feet 2 inches (8.89 m) and a depth of 14 feet 1 inch (4.29 m). She was powered by a triple expansion steam engine which had cylinders of 13½ inches (34 cm), 25 inches (64 cm) and 40 inches (100 cm) bore by 27 inches (69 cm) stroke. This could propel her at a speed of 12 knots (22 km/h).

== History ==
Brittany was built for the London, Brighton and South Coast Railway. She was used on their Newhaven – Caen route. In 1912, Brittany was sold to the London and South Western Railway. Her port of registry was Southampton. She passed into the ownership of the Southern Railway on 1 January 1923. In 1933, Brittany was renamed Aldershot when the new Brittany entered service with the Southern Railway.

In 1936, Aldershot was sold to D Tripcovich & Compagnie, Italy and renamed Hercules. She was converted to a salvage vessel and was operated under the management of Società Anonima di Navigazione Rimorchi e Salvataggi. Her port of registry was Trieste. On 24 November 1941, Hercules was torpedoed and sunk by HMS Triumph in Heraklion harbour.

== Official Number and code letters ==
Official Numbers were a forerunner to IMO Numbers. Brittany and Aldershot had the United Kingdom Official Number 105657 and used the Code Letters HRNC. Hercules had the Italian Official Number 404 and used the Code Letters IOMU.
