= SS Alberta (1900) =

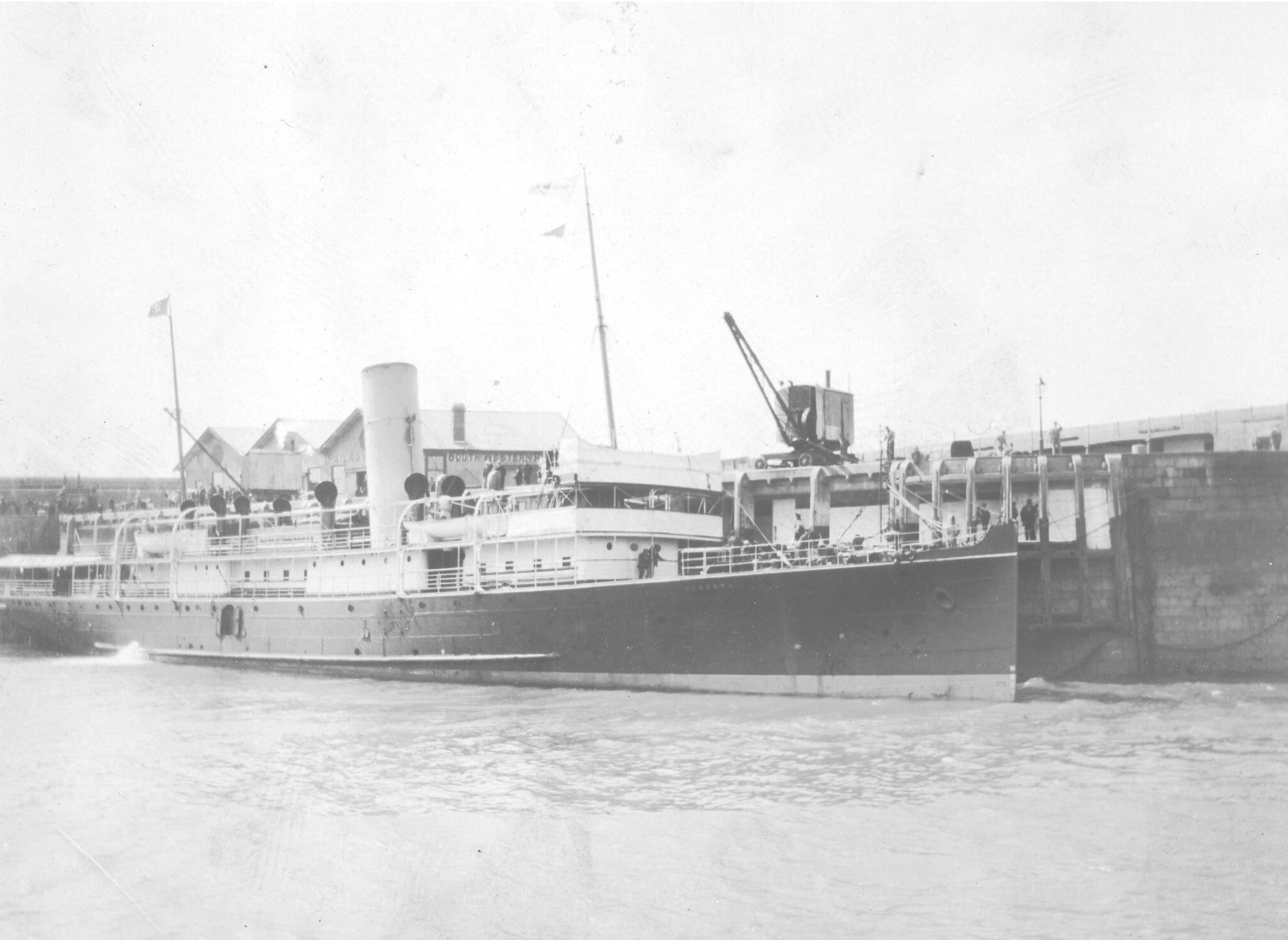
- Alberta in port sometime in 1908.

History
- Name: TSS Alberta
- Operator: 1900–1923: London and South Western Railway; 1923–1930: Southern Railway; 1930–1941: D Inglessi Fils, Navigation de Samos
- Port of registry: (United Kingdom)
- Builder: Clydebank Engineering and Shipbuilding Company
- Yard number: 331
- Launched: 3 April 1900
- Fate: Bombed and sunk 23 April 1941

General characteristics
- Tonnage: 1,236 gross register tons (GRT)
- Length: 270 feet (82 m)
- Beam: 35.6 feet (10.9 m)
- Draught: 14.6 feet (4.5 m)

TSS Alberta was a passenger vessel built for the London and South Western Railway in 1900.

== History ==
The ship was built by the Clydebank Engineering and Shipbuilding Company and launched on 3 April 1900 by Miss Biles, daughter of Professor Biles. She was ordered to replace the ill-fated Stella built by the same builders. She undertook her trials on 22 May 1900 on the Firth of Clyde. The weather was stormy with a strong south-west wind blowing. After doing four runs on the measured mile a period of six hours was completed, and during that time she maintained a speed of 19.8 knots. She was placed on services from Southampton to the Channel Islands.

She was acquired by the Southern Railway in 1923 and sold in 1930 to D Inglessi Fils, Navigation de Samos. She may have changed her name temporarily in 1934 to Mykali. On 23 April 1941 she was bombed and sunk in the Saronic Gulf off Salamis Island by Luftwaffe aircraft.
