= SS Riviera =

Riviera was the name of a number of steamships including:

- SS Riviera (1911), a South Eastern and Chatham Railway ferry
- SS Riviera (1951), a cruise ship built as Ocean Monarch
