= SS Princess Ena (1906) =

History
- Name: SS Princess Ena
- Operator: 1905–1923: London and South Western Railway; 1923–1935: Southern Railway
- Port of registry: (United Kingdom)
- Builder: Gourlay Brothers, Dundee
- Yard number: 224
- Launched: 25 May 1906
- Fate: Caught fire and sank 3 August 1935

General characteristics
- Tonnage: 1,198 gross register tons (GRT)
- Length: 250.6 feet (76.4 m)
- Beam: 33.3 feet (10.1 m)
- Draught: 15.1 feet (4.6 m)

TSS Princess Ena was a passenger vessel built for the London and South Western Railway in 1906.

== History ==
She was built by Gourlay Brothers in Dundee and launched on 25 May 1906. She was built as a replacement for the Hilda, lost in the English Channel in 1905. She was built in four months, with the order being placed in December 1905.

She was requisitioned by the Admiralty in 1915 and converted to a Q-ship. She returned to railway service at the conclusion of hostilities.

She was acquired by the Southern Railway in 1923.

On 3 August 1935 she caught fire on a passage from Jersey to St Malo and sank 10 nautical miles (19 km) south of Jersey, Channel Islands.

The crew were rescued by Duke of Normandy and St. Julien.
