= Tony Knowland =

English professor (1919–2006)

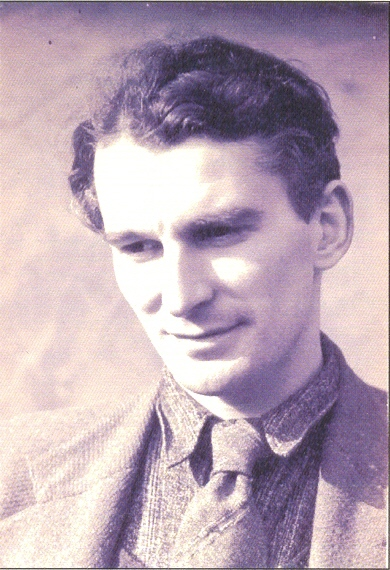
Tony Knowland in 1943

Anthony Stephen Knowland (22 March 1919 – 10 December 2006) was a professor of English literature, specialising in the work of W. B. Yeats, William Shakespeare, and classical Greek literature. He was a conscientious objector in World War II.

== Early life and education ==
Knowland was born in Hove, Sussex, son of Albert James Knowland and Maud Knowland (née Sturley). He was educated at Dulwich College and later at Frensham Heights, Surrey, where he became head boy and studied Latin and Greek. He won a place at Exeter College, Oxford, in 1938. There he studied classics until the outbreak of the Second World War, gaining a wartime degree. In 1947, he returned to Exeter College, where he took English and gained a first-class degree.

== Conscientious objector ==
As a captain in the Suffolk 3rd Division of the British Army, Knowland was involved in planning for the Second Front. However, he became a conscientious objector before the invasion and was court-martialled in 1944. He was represented at the court martial by Raymond Blackburn, dismissed from service, and confined to Windsor Castle for two months because of his knowledge of the invasion plans. On his release, he was employed as a teacher at Frensham Heights, although within weeks as a civilian, he was called up again and had to put his case to the Conscientious Objectors Tribunal at Reading, where it was decreed that, having once put himself at risk of imprisonment, he should be allowed to stand down and return to teaching. According to his daughter Isabel, who wrote his obituary, he was a committed pacifist.

== Career ==
In 1950, he was invited to the University of Toronto in Canada as lecturer in English.

In 1953, he took up a post at Magee University, Derry, where he was elected to the chair of English. As well as directing several Shakespeare plays, he founded a music society at which many distinguished musicians performed, including Julian Bream, Amaryllis Fleming, Alan Loveday, Lamar Crowson, Frederick Grinke, and a 14-year-old Jacqueline du Pré. Contrary to the prevailing ethos of the university, Knowland insisted that Roman Catholics be allowed to join the society.

In 1960, he joined St Clare's, Oxford, and was responsible for directing the academic programme for external London degrees and a liberal arts programme for visiting American students. Knowland became vice principal in 1972.

During his career, he had visiting professorships to universities in Connecticut and Munich. He published work on 17th-century drama, translations of Sophocles and Aristophanes, and was an authority on W. B. Yeats. His book, W.B. Yeats – Dramatist of Vision, was published in 1984.

Knowland was interested in folk music, and from the 1950s, he made many recordings of musicians on the west coast of Ireland, which are now in Ireland's national archives.

== Personal life ==
In December 1943, Knowland married Barbara Amy Morris (1 May 1926 – 4 August 2014), the eldest daughter of John Morris (co-founder of Boriswood publishers) and Pamela Paramythioti (co-founder of St Clare's, Oxford) and granddaughter of the composer Amy Horrocks. Living in Oxford and finally, Woodstock, Oxfordshire, they had five children. Knowland was an accomplished pianist.
