= Anthony Carrigan =

Anthony Carrigan may refer to:

- Anthony Carrigan (actor) (born 1983), American actor
- Anthony Carrigan (academic) (1980–2016), British academic
