= A. Norman Jeffares =

Irish literary scholar (1920–2005)

Alexander Norman "Derry" Jeffares AM (/ˈdʒɛfəz/, 11 August 1920 – 1 June 2005) was an Irish literary scholar.

== Early life and education ==
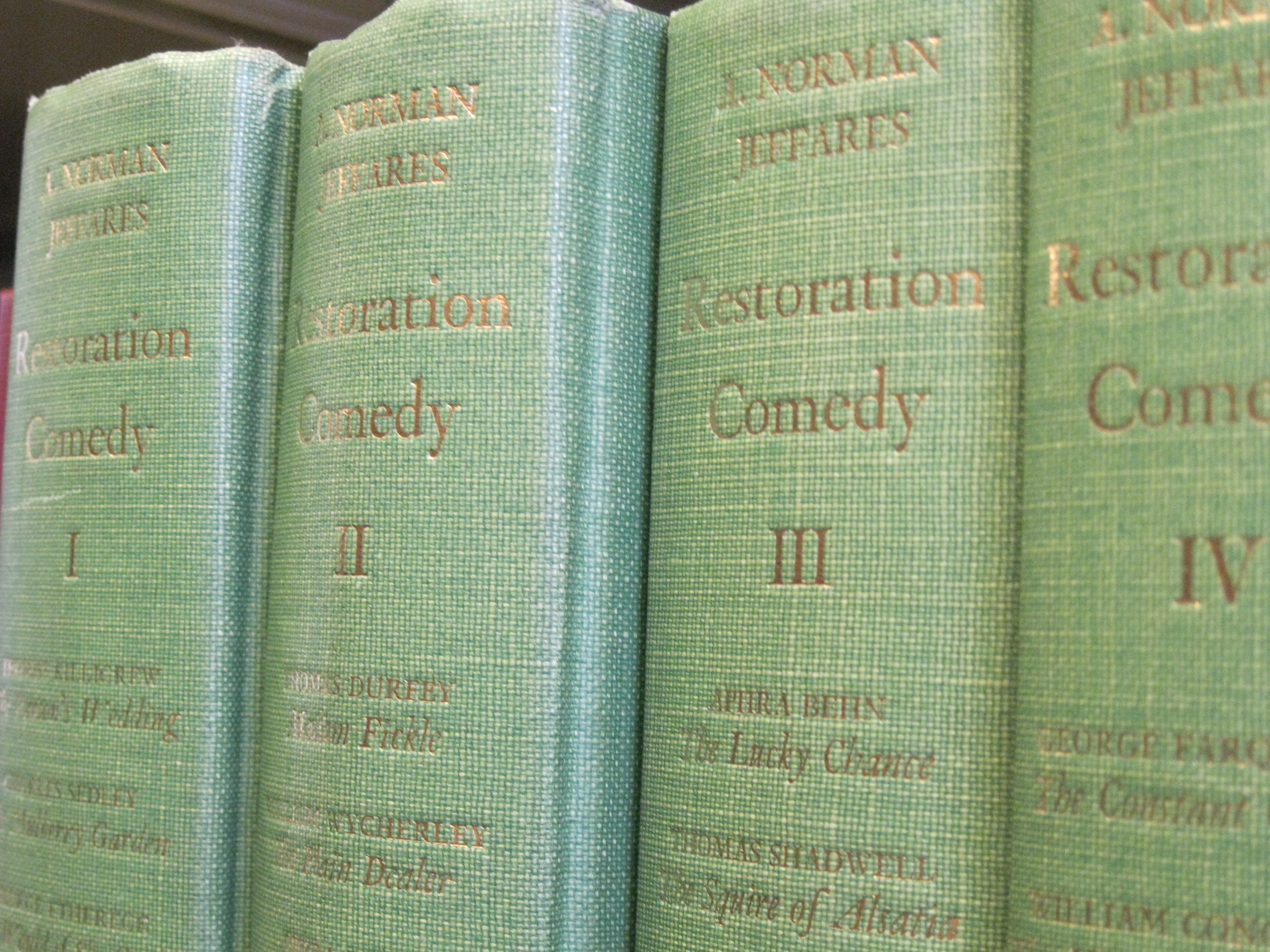
Works by Norman Jeffares

Jeffares was born in Dublin, Ireland, educated at Dublin High School, Trinity College Dublin (where he was elected a Scholar in classics in 1941), and Oriel College, Oxford.

== Academic career ==
Jeffares took up his first academic appointment at the Department of English at the University of Groningen in 1947 and then moved to the University of Edinburgh in 1948. In 1951, at the very early age of 30, he was appointed to the Jury Chair of English at the University of Adelaide, where he stayed until taking up the Chair of English at the University of Leeds in 1957. Finally, he moved to the University of Stirling in 1974. He retired as Emeritus Professor of English in 1985.

A specialist interest throughout his career was the life and works of W. B. Yeats, a subject upon which he was considered a leading authority.

While at Leeds, he was a founder of The Journal of Commonwealth Literature, and was also editor of the publication A Review of English Literature, published by Longmans.

He was the founder of the York Notes series of revision guides, which are still widely used by GCSE and A-Level students.

== Honours ==
In 1978, he was made an honorary fellow of Trinity College Dublin. On Australia Day 1988, Jeffares was appointed an Honorary Member of the Order of Australia, "for service to the study of Australian literature overseas".

In 2013, an edition of the Yeats Annual was dedicated to him.

== Selected list of works ==
=== As author ===
- Trinity College Dublin: Thirty-Four Drawings and Descriptions, Dublin: Alex, Thom & Co., 1944.
- W. B. Yeats: Man and Poet, London: Routledge & Kegan Paul, 1949.
- The Scientific Background: A Prose Anthology, London: Pitman, 1958. (with M. Bryn Davies)
- Oliver Goldsmith, London: Longmans, Green & Co., 1959. (The British Council, Writers and Their Work no. 107)
- The Poetry of W. B. Yeats, London: Edward Arnold, 1961. (Studies in English Literature no. 4)
- George Moore, London: Longmans, Green & Co., 1965. (The British Council, Writers and Their Work no. 180)
- Congreve: Incognita and the Way of the World, London: Edward Arnold, 1966. (Arnold's English Texts)
- Swift, London: Macmillan, 1968. (Modern Judgements series)
- A Commentary on the Collected Poems of W. B. Yeats, London: Macmillan, 1968.
- The Circus Animals. Essays: Mainly Anglo-Irish, London: Macmillan, 1970.
- W. B. Yeats: Profiles in Literature, London: Routledge & Kegan Paul, 1971. (Profiles in Literature series)
- A Commentary on the Collected Plays of W. B. Yeats, London: Macmillan, 1975. (with A. S. Knowland)
- Jonathan Swift, London: Longman, 1976. (The British Council, Writers and Their Work no. 248)
- Anglo-Irish Literature, London: Macmillan, 1982. (Macmillan History of Literature)
- W. B. Yeats. A New Biography, London: Hutchinson, 1988.
- A Pocket History of Irish Literature, Dublin: O'Brien Press, 1997.
- The Irish Literary Movement, London: National Portrait Gallery, 1998. (Character Sketches series)

=== As editor ===
- Cowper: Selected Poems and Letters, Oxford: Oxford University Press, 1963.
- In Excited Reverie: A Centenary Tribute to William Butler Yeats 1865-1939, London: Macmillan, 1965. (with K. G. W. Cross)
- Fair Liberty Was All His Cry: A Tercentenary Tribute to Jonathan Swift, 1667-1745, London: Macmillan, 1967.
- Scott's Mind and Art, Edinburgh: Oliver & Boyd, 1969. (Essays Old and New series)
- Restoration Comedy, The Folio Press/Rowman & Littlefield, 1974. (in 4 volumes)
- W. B. Yeats: The Critical Heritage, London: Routledge & Kegan Paul, 1977. (Critical Heritage series)
- Yeats, Sligo and Ireland, Gerrards Cross: Colin Smythe, 1980. (Irish Literary Studies no. 6)
- Poems of W. B. Yeats. A New Selection, London: Macmillan, 1984.
- An Irish Childhood: An Anthology, London: HarperCollins, 1987. (with Antony Kamm)
- A Jewish Childhood, London: Boxtree, 1988. (with Antony Kamm)
- Yeats the European, Gerrards Cross: Colin Smythe, 1989. (Princess Grace Irish Library series)
- The Gonne-Yeats Letters 1893-1938: Always Your Friend, London: Hutchinson, 1992. (with Anna MacBride White)
- Jonathan Swift: The Selected Poems, London: Kyle Cathie, 1992.
- Collins Dictionary of Quotations, London: HarperCollins, 1995. (with Martin Gray)
- The Secret Rose: Love Poems by W. B. Yeats, New York: Roberts Rinehart, 2001.
- The Poems and Plays of Oliver St John Grogaty, Gerrards Cross: Colin Smythe, 2001.
- Irish Literature: The Eighteenth Century. An Annotated Anthology, Irish Academic Press, 2005. (with Peter Van De Kamp)
- Irish Literature: The Nineteenth Century. An Annotated Anthology, Irish Academic Press, 2005-2007. (in 3 volumes; with P. Van De Kamp)
