= Diary of a Country Priest =

1951 French film by Robert Bresson

- Theatrical release poster
- Directed by: Robert Bresson
- Written by: Robert Bresson
- Based on: The Diary of a Country Priest by Georges Bernanos
- Produced by: Léon Carré; Robert Sussfeld
- Starring: Claude Laydu; André Guibert; Jean Riveyre; Marie-Monique Arkell
- Cinematography: Léonce-Henri Burel
- Edited by: Paulette Robert
- Music by: Jean-Jacques Grünenwald
- Distributed by: Brandon Films Inc.
- Release date: 7 February 1951
- Running time: 115 minutes
- Country: France
- Language: French

Diary of a Country Priest (French: Journal d'un curé de campagne) is a 1951 French drama film written and directed by Robert Bresson. The film stars Claude Laydu in his feature film debut. A faithful adaptation of Georges Bernanos' Grand Prix du Roman-winning novel of the same name, the film tells the story of a sickly young Catholic priest who has been assigned a small village in northern France as his first parish. The film illustrates the eroding religious faith in the French countryside (where Bresson grew up) and the clergy's struggles to reach younger believers disillusioned by the inflexibility, and sometimes hypocritical flexibility, of the Church at the time.

The film was lauded for Laydu's performance, which has been called one of the greatest in the history of cinema. It won numerous awards, including the Best Cinematography and International awards at the Venice International Film Festival and the Prix Louis Delluc. According to Roger Ebert, Diary of a Country Priest and Dreyer's The Passion of Joan of Arc are sometimes called the two greatest Catholic films.

== Plot ==
In the small village of Ambricourt, the new parish priest keeps a diary, where he confides his insecurities about his challenged faith, his inexperience, and his worsening health. Only one person, Miss Louise, attends daily mass. In addition, due to an undiagnosed stomach ailment, the priest subsists on a diet of bread, wine, and sugar.

The priest tries to win over the villagers by asking the Count of Ambricourt for funds to start a Catholic youth club and sports program. However, his mentor, the experienced priest of Torcy, tells him to focus on projecting strength to the village, explaining that obedience comes through respect and not love.

Over time, the priest finds himself drawn into the Count's family drama. The Count and Countess had two children, a teenage girl (Chantal) and a younger boy who died several years ago. The devastated Countess renounced God and withdrew into herself. The Count began an affair with Louise, Chantal's governess. Although both the Countess and Chantal are aware of the affair, the Countess acquiesces while Chantal grows resentful.

Louise complains to the priest that Chantal is mistreating her. The priest agrees to talk to the Count about it, but while the Count warmly welcomes the priest at first, he grows cold when the priest attempts to discuss Chantal and Louise; he expects the priest to turn a blind eye to his adultery. Louise suggests that he might request a transfer to another parish.

As the priest's health deteriorates, he struggles to maintain his faith in God, who he thinks has abandoned him. The priest of Torcy recommends that he see his friend Dr. Delbende, who checks the priest's abdomen but offers no diagnosis. One day, Dr. Delbende kills himself. The priest of Torcy explains that Dr. Delbende was tormented by his loss of faith and the village's low opinion of his medical skills (not unlike the priest of Ambricourt). He concludes that God would not reject a good man even if he committed a mortal sin.

To get Chantal out of the way, the Count and Louise plan to send her to boarding school. Chantal goes to the priest for advice, but he correctly senses that she is suicidal. Following his mentor's advice, the priest intimidates Chantal into handing over her suicide note. She acquiesces, but she is visibly terrified and the priest fails to console her. Chantal privately resolves to ruin him.

The priest visits the embittered Countess on Chantal's behalf. The priest persuades the Countess to reconcile with God, explaining that "God is not a torturer" and pointing out that Jesus already died for mankind's sins, regardless of whether the Countess resents God. That night, the Countess sends the priest a letter of thanks and then dies of a heart condition. Chantal, who overheard the conversation, exacts revenge by lying to her father that the priest drove the Countess to despair. The Count resolves to drive the priest out of town. He arranges for a church investigator to interrogate the priest, but the priest refuses to exonerate himself with the Countess' letter. It is implied that he considers the letter protected by the seal of confession.

Chantal visits the priest to taunt him, promising to "sin for sin's sake." However, she eventually confesses that she saw, and was impressed by, the comfort and enlightenment the priest helped her mother achieve. She asks the priest for his "secret," but the depressed priest responds that it is "a lost secret," concluding that "You too will find it and lose it in turn, and others will pass it on after you."

After hemorrhaging blood, the priest visits a doctor in the city of Lille. He is diagnosed with terminal stomach cancer. The priest calls on his seminary classmate Dufrety, who abandoned the ministry and now lives with a woman out of wedlock. He faints in Dufrety's flat, and Dufrety's partner takes care of him until he dies. Before dying, the priest asks Dufrety for absolution. Dufrety questions whether, as an ex-priest, it is appropriate for him to perform the rites. The priest responds, in his last words: "What does it matter? All is grace."

== Cast ==
- Claude Laydu as Priest of Ambricourt (Curé d'Ambricourt)
- Léon Arvel as Fabregars
- Antoine Balpêtré as Dr. Delbende (Docteur Delbende)
- Jean Danet as Olivier
- Yvette Etiévant (credited as Jeanne Etiévant) as Cleaning Lady (Femme de ménage)
- Adrien Borel (credited as André Guibert) as Priest of Torcy (Curé de Torcy)
- Bernard Hubrenne as Priest Dufréty (Abbé Dufréty) (Note: In France, the title "Abbé" applies to both monastic abbots and lower-ranking clergy. See, for example, the Abbé Sieyès.)
- Nicole Ladmiral as Chantal
- Martine Lemaire as Séraphita Dumouchel
- Nicole Maurey as Miss Louise (Mlle Louise)
- Martial Morange as Deputy Mayor (L'Adjoint)
- Jean Riveyre as Count (Le Comte)
- Gaston Séverin as Canon (Le Chanoine)
- Gilberte Terbois as Madame Dumouchel (Mme Dumouchel)
- Rachel Bérendt (credited as Marie-Monique Arkell) as Countess (La Comtesse)

== Production ==
=== Screenplay ===
At one point, screenwriters Jean Aurenche and Pierre Bost wrote an adaptation of the novel, but author Georges Bernanos rejected their draft. François Truffaut reviewed the Aurenche-Bost draft and concluded that it was unfaithful to both the letter and spirit of the novel. For example, the draft screenplay does not end with "All is grace," and omits the character of Dr. Delbende (Aurenche argued that a good screenplay should not have a character who dies midway through the film).

Bresson did not write his screenplay until after Bernanos was dead, and said he would have deviated more from the novel if Bernanos had still been alive, which Truffaut interpreted to mean that Bresson intended to be faithful to the novel's spirit but would have solicited Bernanos' input on certain modifications (that is, "inventing without betraying"). While the film remains faithful to the spirit of the novel, Bresson strips the story bare with his exceptionally sober film style, to the degree that Truffaut was likely employing understatement when he said the film had sound scenes that were "down-to-earth."

=== Style ===
In the film, Bresson cast some non-professional actors, which is a practice he would expand upon in his subsequent films. His direction of these amateurs, who he referred to as "models", purposely constrained their movements and expressions, as he believed the performers' emotive lack would leave greater room for response in the audience. The models were often encouraged to empty themselves of intention by repeating a take until they lost all sense of the meaning of their actions and were simply moving or speaking "automatically".

The film was Bresson's first to utilize a complex soundtrack and voice-over narration. Its dialogue, which frequently consists of debates on spiritual and ethical matters, is complemented by voice-over commentary drawn from the diary after which the film is titled. Bresson stated that "an ice-cold commentary can warm, by contrast, tepid dialogues in a film. Phenomenon analogous to that of hot and cold in painting." Frequently, the commentary is intentionally redundant, with the priest informing the audience of an action that he has recently, or will shortly, complete on-screen.

French journalist Frédéric Bonnaud praised Bresson's minimalist approach to the film's setting and argued: "For the first time in French cinema, the less the environment is shown, the more it resonates [...] ubiquitous and constant, persistent and unchanging, it doesn’t need to be shown: its evocation through sound is enough. It’s a veritable prison."

== Analysis ==
=== Drama, but not melodrama ===
Throughout his filmography, Bresson was consistently captivated by characters that fall victim to an ineradicable idea or resolution, with Diary of a Country Priest being no exception. However, while his characters necessarily evidence motivated behaviors and decisions, Bresson scrupulously denied any hint of melodrama, and tried to minimize what he referred to as "psychologism" (meaning drama reducible to the intersection of its characters' personalities). Further, he aimed to preclude the insertion of any textual "value judgements" on the content of the film via the construction of its form. The resulting contemplative—perhaps even ascetic—formal distancing is meant to serve Bresson's overriding (Christian) spiritual concern, foregrounding ineffability and irreducible mystery, while nonetheless leaving room for grace.

Frédéric Bonnaud wrote that "Diary of a Country Priest is a film about imprisonment. ... It is a story about someone who tries his best to throw things off balance, and whose best efforts are finally squelched by the weighty order of things. ... [H]aving himself been seen [by the adulterous couple], he now becomes a dangerous intruder. Henceforth, they will not rest until he is beaten down, until he understands that he is an unwelcome stranger in their territory. In the game of society, the rules are unchanging." He added that Bresson's film marks a shift from the genre tropes of postwar French cinema, and facilitated "the slow process of the liberation of postwar French cinema" that led to the New Wave.

=== Revisionist Christian themes ===
Martin Scorsese, a longtime fan of the film, said that Diary of a Country Priest helped strengthen his flagging faith in God. In an interview about his film Silence (2016), another film about a priest who struggles to maintain his faith in an unfriendly environment, Scorsese said that he was particularly drawn to the film's message of Christian mercy and self-forgiveness:

I saw the film for the first time in the mid-60s. I was in my early 20s, and I was growing up, moving beyond the idea of Catholicism that I'd held as a child. Like many children, I was overwhelmed and deeply impressed by the severe side of God as he was presented to us — the God that punishes you when you do something bad, the God of storms and lightning. ...

It was at that time that I saw Bresson's film of Diary of a Country Priest, and it gave me hope. Every character in that picture, with the possible exception of the older priest, is suffering. Every character is feeling punished and most of them are inflicting punishment on each other. And at one point, the priest has an exchange with one of his parishioners, and he says to her: "God is not a torturer. He just wants us to be merciful with ourselves." And that opened something up for me. That was the key. Because even though we feel that God is punishing and torturing us, if we're able to give ourselves the time and space to reflect on it, we realize that we're the ones doing the torturing, and we're the ones we have to be merciful with. I got to meet Bresson once in Paris, and I told him just what the picture meant to me.

After I made Raging Bull, I came to realize that this was what we had made ... this was what the film was about.

== Reception ==
=== Critical reception ===
Diary of a Country Priest was a financial success in France and established Bresson's international reputation as a major film director. Film critic André Bazin wrote an entire essay on the film, calling it a masterpiece "because of its power to stir the emotions, rather than the intelligence." Claude Laydu's debut performance in the title role has been described as one of the greatest in the history of film, with Jean Tulard writing in his Dictionary of Film that "No other actor deserves to go to heaven as much as Laydu."

On the review aggregator website Rotten Tomatoes, the film has a 95% approval rating based on 40 critics, with an average rating of 8.70/10; the site's "critics consensus" reads: "Diary of a Country Priest brilliantly captures one man's spiritual and religious journey -- and the striking next phase in the evolution of a major filmmaking talent." Roger Ebert of the Chicago Sun-Times put the film on his Great Movies list, explaining: "A film like Diary of a Country Priest gathers its strength as it continues. There's always the sense that Bresson knows exactly where he's going and the simplest way to get there." He added that "Diary of a Country Priest has been called one of the two greatest Catholic films, along with Dreyer's The Passion of Joan of Arc." John Simon of the National Review regarded it as Bresson's best film. Armond White of the New York Press praised the film, noting that "Bresson exemplified 20th-century ecumenical intelligence that is much out of fashion today, yet remains singular and powerful."

=== Awards ===
The film was entered into competition for the Golden Lion at the 12th Venice International Film Festival, losing to Akira Kurosawa's Rashomon. At Venice, it won the Best Cinematography award and the International Award. It also won the OCIC (Catholic) award and the Italian Film Critics Award. All together, the film won eight international awards, including the Prix Louis Delluc.

Laydu was nominated for Best Foreign Actor at the 1954 BAFTAs, losing to Marlon Brando for Julius Caesar.

=== Influence ===
Numerous filmmakers have expressed their admiration for the film. Russian filmmaker Andrei Tarkovsky said that it was his favorite film. American filmmaker Martin Scorsese told the 2022 Sight and Sound poll that it was one of the ten greatest films of all time (although he attempted to cast fifteen votes), and cited it as an influence for his films Taxi Driver (1976) and Raging Bull (1980). Paul Schrader, who wrote the script for Taxi Driver, noted the film as a major influence when writing and directing his 2017 film First Reformed. He switched between Diary of a Country Priest and Pickpocket for his Sight and Sound vote. Hong Sang-soo said that watching Diary of a Country Priest inspired him to become a feature filmmaker, explaining that "I keep saying ["All is grace"] to myself every day."

The Swedish filmmaker Ingmar Bergman was "extremely fond" of the film and cited it as a significant influence on his own film Winter Light, and called it "one of the strangest works ever made". The Austrian filmmaker Michael Haneke regards the film as one of his favorite Bresson films. Portuguese filmmaker Pedro Costa and American filmmaker Annie Baker both included the film in their lists of ten films to pick from The Criterion Collection. In addition to Scorsese and Costa, the French streaming website La Cinetek lists François Truffaut, Jacques Audiard, Chantal Akerman, the Dardenne brothers, and Agnieszka Holland as fans of the film.

== See also ==
- Diary of a City Priest

== Sources ==
- Wakeman, John (1987). World Film Directors. Vol. 1. The H. W. Wilson Company.
