= SS Lydia (1890) =

Ferry boat

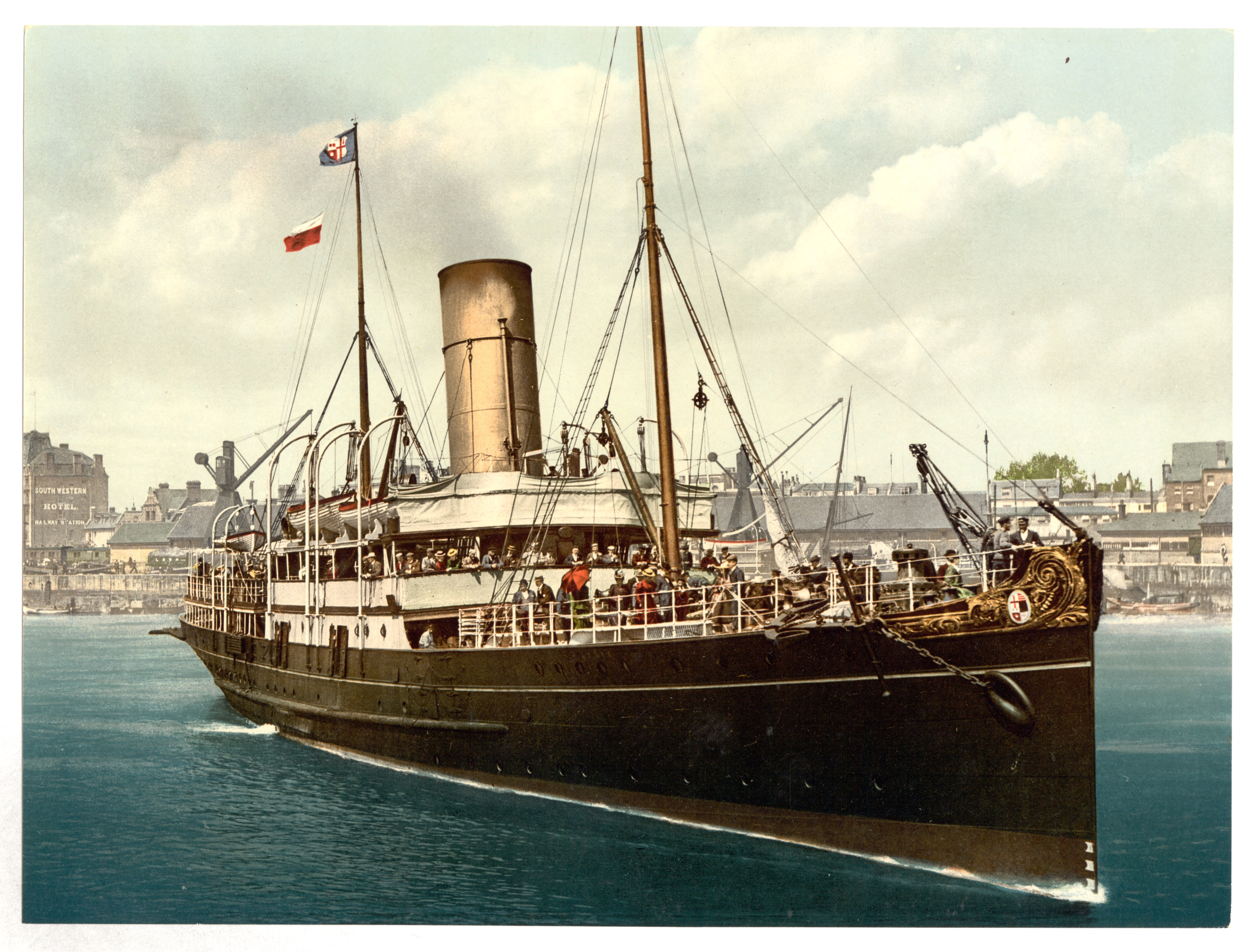
- Photochrom of Lydia

History
- Name: 1890: Lydia; 1923: Ierax
- Owner: 1890: London & South Western Rly; 1920: Thomas Sales; 1921: Montague Yates; 1922: R E V James; 1923: Coast Lines; 1923: Navigation a Vapeur Ionienne; 1929: Hellenic Coast Lines
- Operator: As owner except; 1923: G Yannoulato Freres
- Port of registry: 1890: (United Kingdom) Southampton; 1923: (United Kingdom) Liverpool; 1923: (Greece) Argostoli; 1929: (Greece) Piraeus
- Builder: J & G Thomson, Clydebank
- Yard number: 251
- Launched: 16 July 1890
- Out of service: 1933
- Identification: UK official number 97217; 1890: code letters LNTM; 1923: code letters JFGT
- Fate: Scrapped 1933

General characteristics
- Tonnage: 1,059 GRT, 193 NRT
- Length: 253.0 ft (77.1 m)
- Beam: 35.1 ft (10.7 m)
- Depth: 14.8 ft (4.5 m)
- Decks: 1
- Installed power: 360 NHP
- Propulsion: 2 × screws; 2 × triple expansion engines
- Speed: 19 1/2 knots (36.1 km/h)
- Notes: sister ships: Frederica, Stella

SS Lydia was a passenger ferry that was built in Scotland in 1890 for the London and South Western Railway. From 1920 onward she passed through several owners. In 1923 she was renamed Ierax and registered in Greece. She was scrapped in 1933.

== Building and registration ==
In 1890 J & G Thomson Ltd at Clydebank in Glasgow built a set of three sister ships for the LSWR's fast mail and passenger service between Southampton and the Channel Islands: Frederica, Lydia and Stella. Lydia was the second of the trio to be built. She was launched on 16 July 1890 and made her sea trials on the River Clyde on 12 September 1890.

Her registered length was 253.0 ft (77.1 m), her beam was 35.1 ft (10.7 m) and her depth was 14.8 ft (4.5 m). Her tonnages were 1,059 GRT and 193 NRT. She was built with accommodation for 170 first class passengers, 70 second class and numerous steerage passengers.

Lydia had twin screws, each powered by a three-cylinder triple expansion steam engine. Between them her two engines were rated at 360 NHP and gave her a speed of 19 1/2 knots (36.1 km/h) on her sea trials.

The LSWR registered Lydia at Southampton. Her United Kingdom official number was 97217 and her code letters were LNTM.

== Career ==
In 1915 a submarine attacked Lydia, but the torpedo passed 50 yards from the ship.

In 1920 the LSWR sold Lydia. In 1923 Coast Lines bought her and re-registered her in Liverpool. Coast Lines planned to operate her between Dublin and Preston, Lancashire, but then sold her that same year to Navigation a Vapeur Ionienne, who renamed her Ierax and registered her in Argostoli in Greece. Her code letters were changed to JFGT. In 1929 she passed to Hellenic Coast Lines, who registered her in Piraeus. She was scrapped in 1933.
