= SS Frederica (1890) =

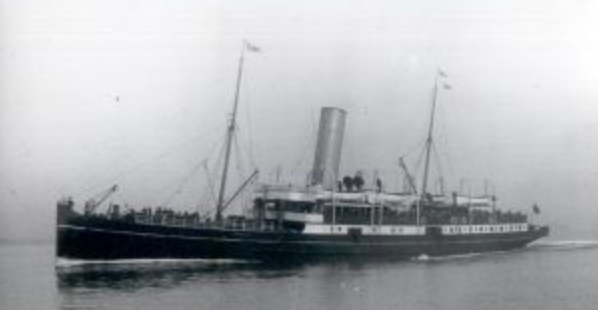
- Frederica

History
- Name: 1890: Frederica; 1912: Nilufer
- Owner: 1890: London & South Western Rly; 1911: Idarei Massouseih; 1912: Administration de Navigation a Vapeur Ottomane
- Operator: As owner except: 1914: Ottoman Navy
- Port of registry: 1890: (United Kingdom) Southampton; 1912: (Ottoman Empire) Constantinople
- Builder: J & G Thomson, Clydebank
- Yard number: 250
- Launched: 5 June 1890
- Identification: UK official number 97212; 1890: code letters LTSV
- Fate: Sunk by mine, 1914

General characteristics
- Tonnage: 1,059 GRT, 193 NRT
- Length: 253.0 ft (77.1 m)
- Beam: 35.1 ft (10.7 m)
- Draught: 15 ft 8 in (4.78 m)
- Depth: 14.8 ft (4.5 m)
- Decks: 2
- Installed power: 360 NHP
- Propulsion: 2 × screws; 2 × triple expansion engines
- Crew: as minelayer: 73
- Notes: sister ships: Lydia, Stella

SS Frederica was a passenger ferry that was built in Scotland in 1890 for the London and South Western Railway. In 1912 she was sold to Ottoman owners who renamed her Nilufer. In 1914 the Ottoman Navy used her as a minelayer. A mine sank her in November 1914.

== Building and registration ==
In 1890 J & G Thomson Ltd at Clydebank in Glasgow built a set of three sister ships for the LSWR's fast mail and passenger service between Southampton and the Channel Islands: Frederica, Lydia and Stella. Frederica was built as yard number 250 and was the first of the trio to be built, being launched on 5 June 1890.

Frederica's registered length was 253.0 ft (77.1 m), her beam was 35.1 ft (10.7 m) and her depth was 14.8 ft (4.5 m). Her tonnages were 1,059 GRT and 193 NRT. She had twin screws, each powered by a three-cylinder triple expansion steam engine. Between them her two engines were rated at 360 NHP.

The LSWR registered Frederica at Southampton. Her United Kingdom official number was 97212 and her code letters were LTSV.

== Career ==
Frederica was in Southampton and dressed for the opening of the new deep-water dock by Queen Victoria on 26 July 1890. The ship's arrival in Guernsey on 31 July 1860 at 6:23 a.m. was witnessed by many observers, and she then left at 7:00 a.m. and went to Jersey, with her arrival there at 8.33 a.m. witnessed by a thousand people on the pier. On 4 September 1890 she broke the record for the fastest passage from Guernsey to Southampton, leaving at 10.15 a.m. and arriving in Southampton Docks at 3.30 p.m., a time of 5 hours 15 minutes. In October 1890 she made the same voyage in 5 hours 8 minutes.

In 1911 she was sold to Idarei Massousieh in Constantinople in the Ottoman Empire. In 1912 she was sold to the Administration de Navigation a Vapeur Ottomane, who renamed her Nilufer and registered her in Constantinople. After the Ottoman Empire entered the First World War I at the end of October 1914, the Ottoman Navy took her over as a minelayer, commanded by Hasan Murad. She was sunk by a Bulgarian mine on 22 November 1914 in the Black Sea near Rila, Bulgaria.
