= Ambricourt =

- Commune
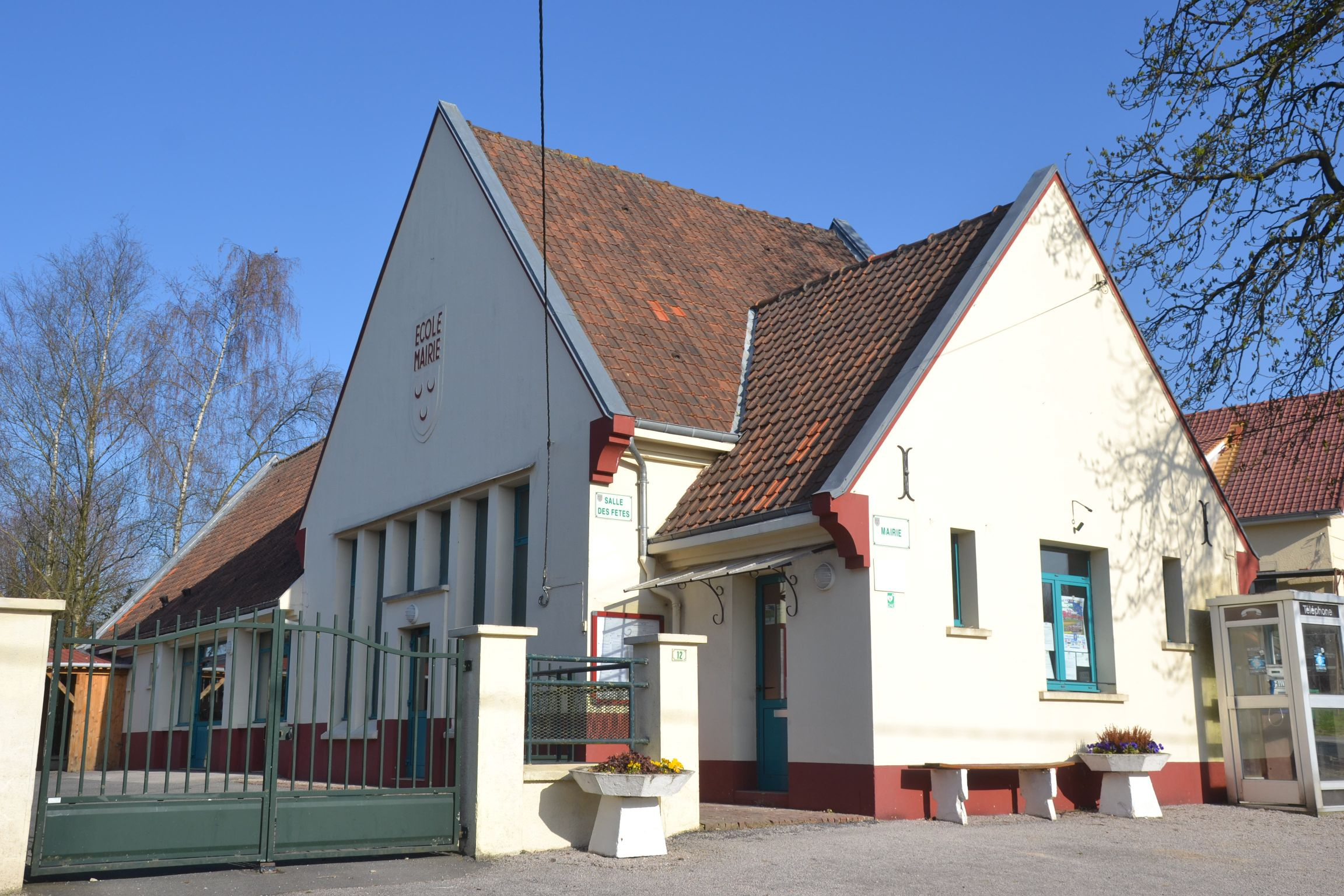
- The town hall and school of Ambricourt

- Coat of arms
- Location of Ambricourt
- Location within France Location within Hauts-de-France
- Coordinates: 50°28′16″N 2°10′42″E
- Country: France
- Region: Hauts-de-France
- Department: Pas-de-Calais
- Arrondissement: Montreuil
- Canton: Fruges
- Intercommunality: CC Haut Pays du Montreuillois

Government
  - Mayor (2020–2026): Raphael Herbert
- Area^{1}: 3.39 km^{2} (1.31 sq mi)
- Elevation: 124 m (407 ft)
- Highest elevation: 138 m (453 ft)
- Lowest elevation: 93 m (305 ft)
- Population (2023): 118
  - Density: 34.8/km^{2} (90.2/sq mi)
- Time zone: UTC+01:00 (CET)
  - Summer (DST): UTC+02:00 (CEST)
- INSEE/Postal code: 62026 /62310
- ^{1} French Land Register data, which excludes lakes, ponds, glaciers > 1 km^{2} (0.386 sq mi or 247 acres) and river estuaries.

Ambricourt (French pronunciation: [ɑ̃bʁikuʁ]) is a commune in the Pas-de-Calais department in northern France.

The commune is the setting of Georges Bernanos's 1936 novel The Diary of a Country Priest (Journal d'un curé de campagne) and Robert Bresson's 1951 film adaptation of the same name.

== Geography ==
A small village situated some 15 miles (24 km) east of Montreuil-sur-Mer, on the D71 E4 road.

== Population ==
Historical population
Year	Pop.	±% p.a.
1968	183	—
1975	158	−2.08%
1982	147	−1.03%
1990	111	−3.45%
1999	102	−0.94%
2007	114	+1.40%
2012	140	+4.19%
2017	112	−4.36%
2023	118	+0.87%
Source: INSEE

== See also ==
- Communes of the Pas-de-Calais department
