= Anthony Carrigan (academic) =

Anthony Carrigan speaking at the conference Reframing Disaster, Leeds, 28–29 November 2014.

Anthony James Carrigan (11 September 1980 – 3 March 2016) was a British academic noted for his pioneering work in combining the theoretical paradigms of postcolonialism and environmental studies (in particular ecocriticism).

He was described in 2012 as "a lively and authoritative new voice in postcolonial studies".

== Biography ==
Carrigan attended Girton College, Cambridge, graduating with a BA in English, winning Girton's Charity Reeves Prize in English and an Emily Davies Scholarship in 2001. He took his MA at the School of Advanced Study, University of London. He completed his PhD thesis, Representations of Tourism in Postcolonial Island Literatures in the School of English at the University of Leeds, in 2008.

Following his PhD, Carrigan took up a lectureship at Keele University in 2009, in the course of which he also held a fellowship at the Rachel Carson Center for Environment and Society at LMU Munich (January–June 2012).

In September 2013 he returned to the School of English at Leeds University as a lecturer in postcolonial literature and cultures, where he worked until his death in Manchester following an extended period of illness from cancer in 2016, at the age of 35.

Carrigan was an active supporter of the Bhopal Medical Appeal. In June 2016, a special issue of the Journal of Commonwealth Literature on 'postcolonial environments' was dedicated to him. A section of the conference The Future of Wild Europe in September of that year was also dedicated to him.

== Work ==
Carrigan is best known for his 2011 monograph Postcolonial Tourism: Literature, Culture, and Environment. The study was innovative in examining tourism from a postcolonial perspective, and for its argument that "postcolonial literature can shed light on current tourism practices in island states and provide ways for local residents to negotiate a form of sustainable and emancipatory tourism from within the tourism system".

But it was more significant again for bringing into dialogue the fields of postcolonialism and ecocriticism, on which grounds it has been characterised as "groundbreaking", "pioneering", and "rich, complex and nuanced". It has been the stated inspiration for subsequent research by others.

At the time of his death, Carrigan was establishing new approaches to disaster studies, "addressing how postcolonial perspectives might challenge, reject, or reconfigure key disaster studies concepts such as resilience, risk, adaptation, and vulnerability, while at the same time asking how disaster studies insights can help frame and inform interpretations of postcolonial disasters".

Carrigan was the editor of a special issue of the journal Moving Worlds entitled Catastrophe & Environment, and an editor of the 2015 collection Global Ecologies and the Environmental Humanities: Postcolonial Approaches.

== Publications ==
=== Monograph ===
- Postcolonial Tourism: Literature, Culture, and Environment, Routledge Research in Postcolonial Literatures, 33 (New York: Routledge, 2011).

=== Edited volumes ===
- Global Ecologies and the Environmental Humanities: Postcolonial Approaches, ed. by Elizabeth DeLoughrey, Jill Didur, and Anthony Carrigan, Routledge Interdisciplinary Perspectives on Literature, 41 (New York: Routledge, 2015)
- Moving Worlds: A Journal of Transcultural Writings, 14.2 (2014). Special issue: Catastrophe and Environment

=== Journal articles ===
- with Shamira A. Meghani, "Reframing Disaster: Creativity and Activism", The Journal of Commonwealth Literature, 51.2 (2016), pp. 256–74, doi:10.1177/0021989415626209
- "Dark Tourism and Postcolonial Studies: Critical Intersections", Postcolonial Studies, 17 (2014), pp. 236–50, doi:10.1080/13688790.2014.993425
- "Introduction: Representing Catastrophe", Moving Worlds: A Journal of Transcultural Writings, 14.2 (2014), pp. 3–13
- "'Justice is on our side'? Animal’s People, Generic Hybridity, and Eco-Crime", Journal of Commonwealth Literature], 47.2 (2012), pp. 159–74
- "(Eco)Catastrophe, Reconstruction, and Representation: Montserrat and the Limits of Sustainability", New Literatures Review, 47–48 (2011), pp. 111–28
- "Postcolonial Disaster, Pacific Nuclearization, and Disabling Environments", Journal of Literary and Cultural Disability Studies, 4.3 (2010), pp. 255–72
- "Postcolonial Tourism, Island Specificity, and Literary Representation: Observations on Derek Walcott’s Omeros", Space and Culture, 13.2 (2010), pp. 154–63
- "Tourism, Culture, and Reindigenisation in Kiana Davenport’s Shark Dialogues and Georgia Ka‘apuni McMillen’s School for Hawaiian Girls", Journal of Postcolonial Writing, 45.2 (2009), pp. 181–90
- "Preening with Privilege, Bubbling Bilge: Representations of Cruise Tourism in Paule Marshall’s Praisesong for the Widow and Derek Walcott’s Omeros", Interdisciplinary Studies in Literature and Environment, 14.1 (2007), pp. 143–59
- "'Hotels are Squatting on My Metaphors': Tourism, Sustainability, and Sacred Space in the Caribbean", Journal of Commonwealth and Postcolonial Studies, 13.2–14.1 (2006–7), 59–82.
- "Negotiating Personal Identity and Cultural Memory in Olaudah Equiano's Interesting Narrative", Wasafiri, 21.2 (2006), pp. 42–47

=== Book chapters ===
- 'Nature, Ecocriticism, and the Postcolonial Novel', in The Cambridge Companion to the Postcolonial Novel, ed. by Ato Quayson (New York: Cambridge University Press, 2016), pp. 81–98, doi:10.1017/CBO9781316459287.006
- with Elizabeth DeLoughrey and Jill Didur, ‘Introduction: A Postcolonial Environmental Humanities’, in Global Ecologies and the Environmental Humanities: Postcolonial Approaches, ed. by Elizabeth DeLoughrey, Jill Didur, and Anthony Carrigan, Routledge Interdisciplinary Perspectives on Literature, 41 (New York: Routledge, 2015), pp. 1–32, and in What Postcolonial Theory Doesn't Say, ed. by Anna Bernard, Ziad Elmarsafy, and Stuart Murray (London and New York: Routledge, 2015), pp. 202–21
- ‘Towards a Postcolonial Disaster Studies’, in Global Ecologies and the Environmental Humanities: Postcolonial Approaches, ed. by Elizabeth DeLoughrey, Jill Didur, and Anthony Carrigan, Routledge Interdisciplinary Perspectives on Literature, 41 (New York: Routledge, 2015), pp. 117–39
- with Ilan Kelman, J. C. Gaillard, Jessica Mercer, and James Lewis, ‘Island Vulnerability and Resilience: Combining Knowledges for Disaster Risk Reduction, Including Climate Change Adaptation’, in Global Ecologies and the Environmental Humanities: Postcolonial Approaches, ed. by Elizabeth DeLoughrey, Jill Didur, and Anthony Carrigan, Routledge Interdisciplinary Perspectives on Literature, 41 (New York: Routledge, 2015), pp. 162–85
- ‘Cultural Sustainability and Postcolonial Island Literatures’, in Travel Writing and Ethics: Theory and Practice, ed. by Corinne Fowler, Charles Forsdick, and Ludmilla Kostova, Routledge Research in Travel Writing, 7 (London and New York: Routledge, 2013), 128–49.
- ‘ “Out of this great tragedy will come a world class tourism destination”: Disaster, Ecology, and Post-Tsunami Tourism Development in Sri Lanka’, in Postcolonial Ecologies: Literatures of the Environment, ed. by Elizabeth DeLoughrey and George Handley (Oxford: Oxford University Press, 2011), 273–90
- ‘Haunted Places, Development, and Opposition in Kamau Brathwaite’s “The Namsetoura Papers” ’, in Postcolonial Ghosts/Fantômes Post-Coloniaux, ed. by Mélanie Joseph-Vilain and Judith Misrahi-Barak (Montpellier: Presses Universitaires de la Méditerranée, 2010), 157–73.

=== Notes ===
- "Reply to 'Mind the "Gap Year": A Critical Discourse Analysis of Volunteer Tourism Promotional Material'", Global Discourse, 4.1 (2014), 47–48.

=== Journalism ===
- with Clare Barker, "Bhopal: How Activists and Artists Kept this Ongoing Disaster in the Public Eye", The Conversation (3 December 2014), https://theconversation.com/bhopal-how-activists-and-artists-kept-this-ongoing-disaster-in-the-public-eye-34998.

=== Reviews ===
- Review: Bonnie Roos and Alex Hunt, eds., Postcolonial Green: Environmental Politics and World Narratives (Charlottesville and London: University of Virginia Press, 2011). In MHRA, 107.3 (2012), 911–13.
- Review: Graham Huggan and Helen Tiffin, Postcolonial Ecocriticism: Literature, Animals, Environment (New York and London: Routledge, 2010). In Journal of Postcolonial Writing, 47.3 (2011), 352–53.
- Review: Elizabeth DeLoughrey, Routes and Roots: Navigating Caribbean and Pacific Island Literatures (Honolulu: University of Hawaii Press, 2007). In New West Indian Guide, 84.3–4 (2010), 328–30.
