= SS Stella (1890) =

Passenger ferry wrecked off the Casquets in 1899

Coordinates: 49.71°N 2.37°W

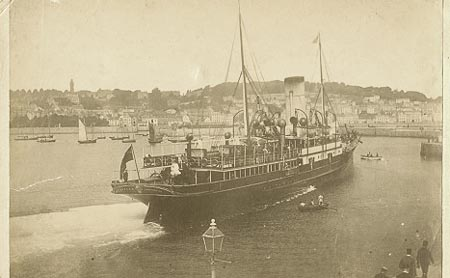
- Stella

History

United Kingdom
- Name: Stella
- Owner: London and South Western Railway
- Port of registry: Southampton
- Route: Southampton – Channel Islands
- Builder: J & G Thomson, Clydebank
- Cost: £62,000
- Yard number: 252
- Launched: 16 September 1890
- Completed: October 1890
- Identification: UK official number 97219; code letters LWKQ
- Fate: Wrecked, 30 March 1899

General characteristics
- Tonnage: 1,059 GRT, 193 NRT
- Length: 253.0 ft (77.1 m)
- Beam: 35.1 ft (10.7 m)
- Depth: 14.8 ft (4.5 m)
- Decks: 1
- Installed power: 360 NHP
- Propulsion: 2 × screws; 2 × triple expansion engines
- Speed: 19 1/2 knots (36.1 km/h)
- Capacity: 712 passengers
- Crew: 43
- Notes: sister ships: Frederica, Lydia

Stella was a passenger ferry in service with the London and South Western Railway (LSWR). She was built in Glasgow in 1890, and wrecked in 1899 off the Casquets during a crossing from Southampton to Guernsey.

== Building and registration ==
In 1890 J & G Thomson Ltd at Clydebank in Glasgow built a set of three sister ships for the LSWR: Frederica, Lydia and Stella. Stella was yard number 252, and was the last of the three to be launched and completed. A Miss Chisholm launched Stella on 15 September 1890. The ship was completed that October. Her registered length was 253.0 ft (77.1 m), her beam was 35.1 ft (10.7 m) and her depth was 14.8 ft (4.5 m). Her tonnages were 1,059 GRT and 193 NRT.

Stella had twin screws, each powered by a three-cylinder triple expansion steam engine. Between them her two engines were rated at 360 NHP and gave her a speed of 19 1/2 knots (36.1 km/h).

Stella could carry 712 passengers and carried 754 lifejackets, 12 lifebuoys and her lifeboats could carry 148 people. Stella was built for the LSWRs Southampton – Channel Islands service.

The LSWR registered Stella at Southampton. Her United Kingdom official number was 97219 and her code letters were LWKQ.

== Shipwreck ==
On Maundy Thursday, 30 March 1899, Stella left Southampton for Saint Peter Port, Guernsey carrying 147 passengers and 43 crew. Many of the passengers were travelling to the Channel Islands for an Easter holiday or returning home there during the Easter break. Stella departed Southampton at 11:25 and after passing The Needles proceeded at full speed across the Channel. Some fog banks were encountered and speed was reduced twice while passing through these. Approaching the Channel Islands, another fog bank was encountered, but speed was not reduced. Shortly before 16:00, the fog signal from the Casquets Lighthouse was heard and the Casquets came into view directly ahead. Captain Reeks ordered the engines full astern and attempted to turn away from the rocks. Stella scraped along two rocks, and then her bottom was ripped open by a submerged granite reef.

Stella sank in eight minutes. Four lifeboats were successfully launched, while a fifth capsized. The women and children first protocol was observed, although one stewardess, Mary Ann Rogers, gave up her lifejacket and refused a place in a lifeboat. The capsized lifeboat was later righted by a freak wave and 12 people managed to climb into it. Four of these died of exposure during the night. The eight remaining survivors were rescued by the French Naval tug Marsouin.

One lifeboat, with 38 survivors on board, had a cutter in tow with 29 survivors on board. These two boats were sighted at 07:00 on 31 March by the LSWR steamship Vera. They were picked up and landed at St Helier, Jersey. The other cutter, with 24 survivors on board, had a dinghy in tow with 13 survivors on board. They were picked up by the Great Western Railway (GWR) steamship Lynx, sailing from Weymouth to St Peter Port. The LSWR steamship Honfleur assisted in the search for survivors. In all, 86 passengers and 19 crew died in the sinking.

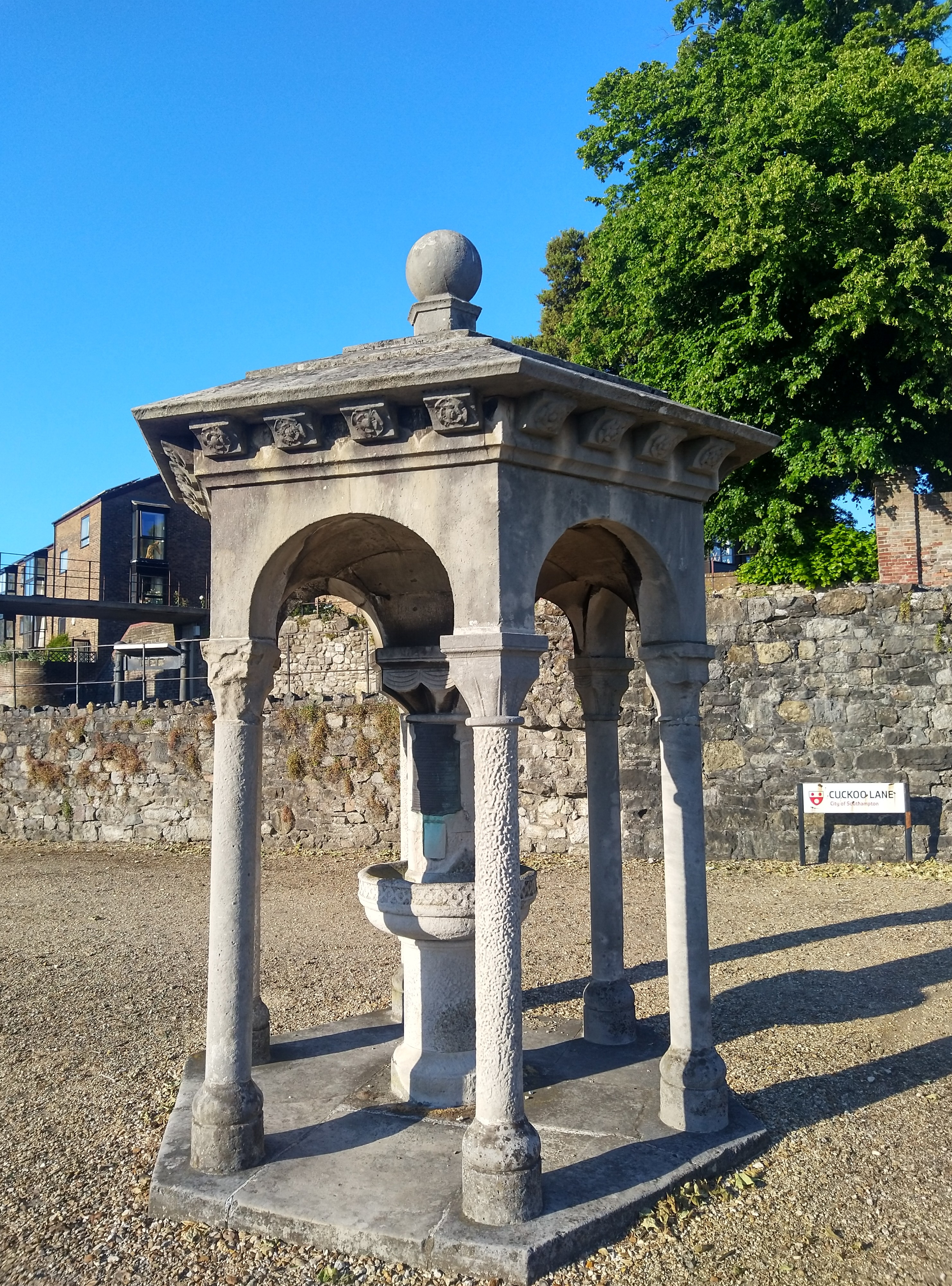
Stella Memorial fountain to Mary Anne Rogers, Southampton

Famed English opera soprano Greta Williams, who was a passenger on the Stella, was hailed as a heroine for comforting the ship's frightened survivors as they awaited their rescuers. A poem by William McGonagall, published just after the shipwreck, contained the lines:

But the sufferings of the survivors are pitiful to hear,
And I think all Christian people for them will drop a tear,
Because the rowers of the boats were exhausted with damp and cold;
And the heroine of the wreck was Miss Greta Williams, be it told.

She remained in as open boat with her fellow-passengers and crew,
And sang "O rest in the Lord, and He will come to our rescue";
And for fourteen hours they were rowing on the mighty deep,
And when each man was done with his turn he fell asleep.

Two Channel Islands divers discovered Stella's wreck in June 1973. It lies in 49 metres (161 ft) of water south of the Casquets.

== Inquiry ==
The Board of Trade's inquiry into the wreck opened at the Guildhall, Westminster on 27 April 1900 and lasted six days. It was alleged that Stella had been racing against the GWR ship. This allegation was rejected by the LSWR. Although the inquiry could not come to a definite conclusion about whether there had been racing or not, blame was placed entirely upon Captain William Reeks for continuing at full speed in the fog.

This finding gave forty bereaved families cause to sue the LSWR for compensation. The company and their insurers went to great lengths to avoid paying out, but an eventual finding by the Court of Appeal resulted in a series of awards being made to individuals, at considerable cost to the LSWR.

== Memorials ==
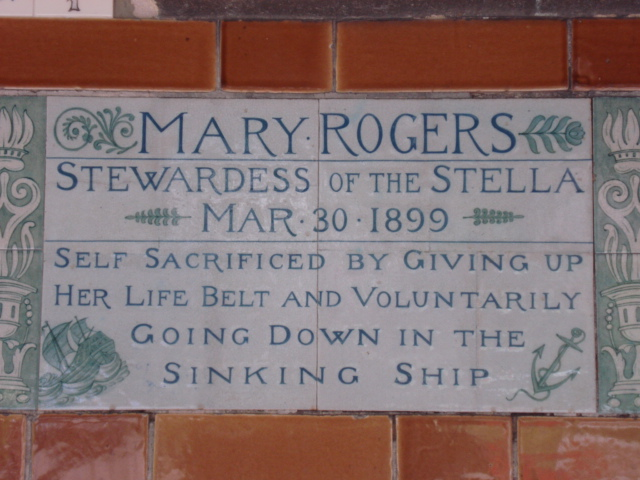
Plaque to Mary Ann Rogers in Postman's Park, London.

=== Channel Islands ===
A metal plaque at St Peter Port Harbour commemorates the wreck of Stella. A set of two commemorative postage stamps was issued by Alderney in 1999. A set of six commemorative postage stamps was issued by Alderney on 13 February 2019 to mark the 120th anniversary of the sinking.

=== Liverpool ===
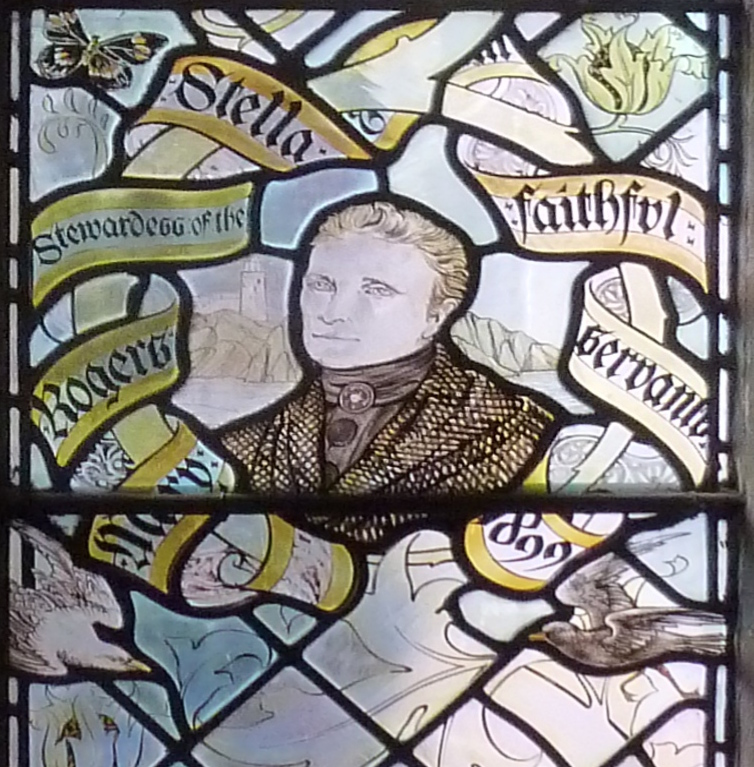
Mary Ann Rogers detail from Liverpool Anglican Cathedral

In Liverpool Cathedral, Mary Ann Rogers is one of eight women commemorated in a stained glass window in the Staircase Window of the Lady Chapel. The other seven women are Anne Cecile, Grace Darling, Agnes Jones, Anna Hinderer, Alice Marvel, Louisa Stewart and Kitty Wilkinson.

=== London ===
Mary Ann Rogers is commemorated on the "Memorial to Heroic Self Sacrifice" in Postman's Park, London.

=== Southampton ===
The Stella Memorial in Southampton commemorates the shipwreck, and particularly the actions of Mary Ann Rogers. The memorial was paid for by public subscription. Amongst the subscribers were Lady Montagu of Beaulieu, Earl Grey and the Duke of Westminster. A total of £570 was raised, of which £250 went to Mary Ann Rogers' family and the rest was spent on the memorial.

== See also ==
Hilda, a London and South Western Railway steamship which sank off Saint-Malo in 1905 with the loss of 125 lives.
