= Bonne nuit les petits =

1970s animated television series

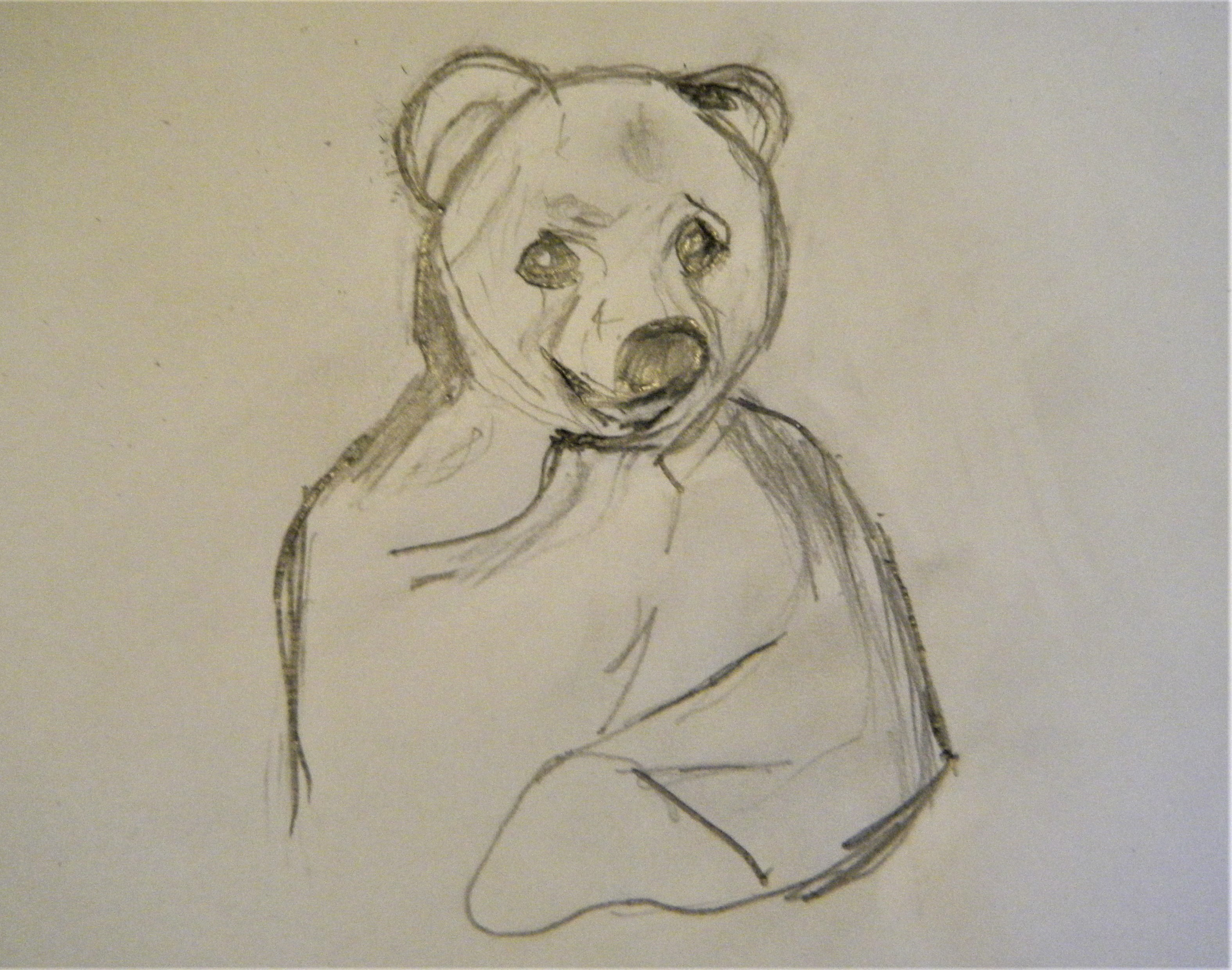
- A sketch of Nounours the bear
- Genre: Children's television series
- Country of origin: France
- No. of seasons: 9

Production
- Running time: 3-5 minutes

Original release
- Network: ORTF
- Release: December 10, 1962 – January 31, 1997

Bonne nuit les petits (English: "Good night kids") is a puppet television series which initially ran from 1962 to 1973, created by Claude Laydu. It had a revival series that aired from 1994-1997.

The series revolved Nounours the bear and Ulysses the sandman, whom every night on their flying cloud, visit the children Nicolas and Pimprenelle, as Nounours asks the two about their day, or tells them a story.

== History ==
The first episode aired on 10 December 1962 just before the 20 pm News on RTF. The series was initially directed by Michel Manini. Episodes were very short (less than 5 minutes).
