= Adrien Borel =

French psychiatrist and psychoanalyst

Adrien Alphonse Alcide Borel (19 March 1886, in Paris – 19 September 1966, in Beaumont-lès-Valence) was a French psychiatrist and psychoanalyst.

== Biography ==
Son of Joseph Adrien Alphonse Borel, a doctor from the Ardèche and grandson of a pharmacist from Crest, he received his early education in Privas and Lyon, where he passed his baccalauréat. He studied medicine in Paris, where he became an intern in 1908 at the Sainte-Anne Hospital Center and Bichat hospitals, before obtaining his title in 1913. His medical thesis, defended in 1913, is entitled “Contribution à l'étude des réflexes dans la démence précoce” .

During the First World War I, he was seriously wounded in action in 1915, while serving as an auxiliary surgeon. He began Psychoanalysis with René Laforgue, and later became one of the first to practice psychoanalytic treatment in France; he was also interested in the arts, especially literature. He was particularly close to the Surrealists, sharing with them an interest in the unconscious and daydreaming - he wrote Les Rêveurs éveillés (Gallimard, 1925), in collaboration with Gilbert Robin.

From the mid-1920s, he worked as a psychotherapist for a number of writers, including Michel Leiris and Georges Bataille, before ceasing to practice analysis. His meeting with Bataille was crucial, especially for the writer, and the two remained lifelong friends. It was following his analysis with Borel that Bataille wrote Story of the Eye, his first book, published anonymously in 1928 under the pseudonym Lord Auch and distributed under the cloak. During his analysis, the psychiatrist gave Bataille photographs of the Chinese torture victim Fou-Tchou Li, cut up alive into a hundred pieces (Lingchi). These images, which had, in his own words, an “infinite value of reversal” on him, were first evoked by Bataille in his essay L'Expérience intérieure (1943), and published thirty-five years later in Les Larmes d'Éros (1961).

In 1926, Adrien Borel was a founding member of the Paris Psychoanalytic Society, which he chaired from 1932 to 1934, before resigning after the war.

In 1950, under the Pseudonym “André Guibert”, Adrien Borel played the role of the Curé de Torcy in Robert Bresson The Diary of a Country Priest, based on the novel by Georges Bernanos.

From 1949 to 1955, he worked at Hôpital Bichat with Professor Guy Laroche, head of department.

In 1957, he became president of the Société médico-psychologique, which he had joined in 1923.

A bon vivant who was close to his patients, a confidant and friend of artists, he was considered a “cultivated and humanistic psychiatrist”.
