= Claude Laydu =

Swiss actor (1927–2011)

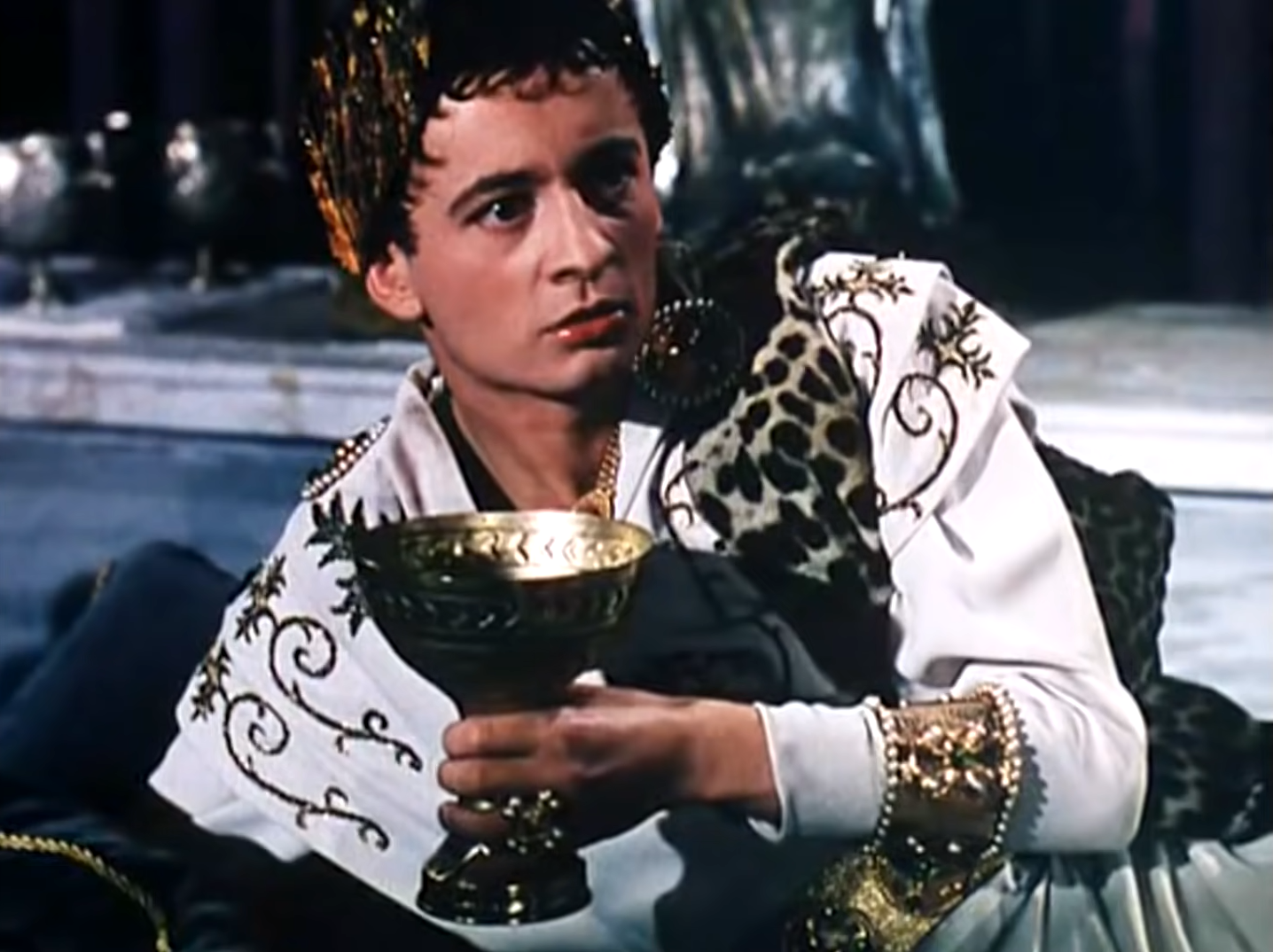
- Laydu as Emperor Valentinian in Attila
- Born: 10 March 1927; Brussels, Belgium
- Died: 29 July 2011 (aged 84); Paris, France
- Occupation: Actor
- Spouse: Christine Balli
- Children: 2

Claude Laydu ([klod lɛdy]; 10 March 1927 – 29 July 2011) was a Belgian-born Swiss actor on stage and in films. He was renowned for his performance in his film debut in the role of the young priest in Robert Bresson's Diary of a Country Priest (1951), which has been described as one of the greatest in the history of film.

== Biography ==
Laydu was born and grew up in Brussels. He moved to Paris to study at the National Academy of Dramatic Arts. He became a member of Madeleine Renaud and Jean-Louis Barrault's company at the Théâtre Marigny, when he was selected by director Robert Bresson for his first role in a film, as the titular young priest in Diary of a Country Priest, based on the 1936 novel of the same name by Georges Bernanos. They met to discuss the role, and Laydu prepared by spending time in a monastery and losing weight.

While Bresson sometimes suggested acting got in the way of his moviemaking, Laydu, a practicing Catholic, "brought his own spirituality, instinctive presence and intense ascetic looks to the role." Claude Laydu's performance in the title role has been described as one of the greatest in the history of film. Jean Tulard, in his Dictionary of Film, wrote of him in this work, "No other actor deserves to go to heaven as much as Laydu."

Laydu's next film, Le Voyage en Amérique (Trip to America, 1951), was a light comedy, but he was seen to have an austere style. His next film was Au Coeur de la Casbah (Heart of the Casbah, 1952), where he struggled in an affair; he played a lawyer of a man condemned to death in Nous Sommes Tous des Assassins (We Are All Murderers), the director André Cayatte's protest against the death penalty; and in Le Chemin de Damas (The Road to Damascus), Laydu played Saint Etienne (Saint Stephen). He played roles as a priest in La Guerra de Dios (I Was a Parish Priest, 1953) and as the title character, the Russian Orthodox Rasputin (1954).

Over the next decade, Laydu worked in film steadily until Mafia alla sbarra (1963). His only two film projects after that were Le Destin de Priscilla Davies (1979) and Nounours (1995), which he co-wrote with his wife, Christine.

In 1962 he and his wife developed a puppet show for television, called Bonne nuit les petits (Good Night, Little Ones). Five minutes long, it was shown nightly and its characters Nounours, Pimprenelle and Nicolas became known by generations of French children, as it was produced for more than a decade. Laydu performed the voice of the Sandman, who spoke the title each night. Laydu and his wife revived it in 1995 as Nounours and it ran for several years. There was associated development and marketing of numerous related books, records, videos and dolls. He and co-star Linette Lemercier (who voiced Oscar) were the only ones who reprised their roles in the reboot series. The show became very popular in Canada as it airs on Ici Radio-Canada Télé right before Le Téléjournal Ce Soir.

== Death ==
Laydu died 29 July 2011 in Paris of a heart condition.

== Personal life ==
He married Christine Balli; the couple had a son and a daughter.

== Filmography ==
Year	Title	Role	Notes
1951	Diary of a Country Priest	Priest of Ambricourt	
1951	The Voyage to America	François Soalhat	
1952	Heart of the Casbah	Michel	
1952	We Are All Murderers	Philippe Arnaud	
1952	The Road to Damascus	Etienne	
1953	Good Lord Without Confession	Roland Dupont	
1953	I Was a Parish Priest	Padre Andrés Mendoza	
1953	Napoleon Road	Pierre Marchand	
1954	Rasputin	Héliodore	
1954	Attila	Valentiniano Caesar	
1955	The Price of Love	Pierre Ménard	
1956	Altair	Mario Rossi	
1956	Symphony of Love	Franz Schubert	
1957	The Wheel	Roland Pelletier	
1960	Dialogue of the Carmelites	Le Chevalier de la Force	
1961	Italienisches Capriccio	Carlo Goldoni	
1963	Mafia alla sbarra		
