= Anne Dreydel =

Anne Dreydel OBE (27 May 1918 – 3 July 2007) was the co-founder of the Oxford English Centre, which later became St Clare's, Oxford. In 1958 she was awarded the German state decoration of Bundesverdienstkreuz which, in 2001, was then upgraded to the Commander's Cross. In 1981 she was appointed an OBE for her services to education.

At the age of 22, during the Second World War, Dreydel was badly injured by a German bomb that fell on her London home. The explosion killed her stepfather and paralysed her from the waist down. After over a year of recovery she left hospital, but she remained in a wheelchair for the remainder of her life.

Dreydel studied English at St. Anne's College in Oxford from 1943 and studied German in Bonn during her holidays. In 1947 she founded the Oxford-Bonn Universities Committee to develop the twinning of the University of Oxford and the University of Bonn and their respective cities. The link encouraged students from Germany to study at Oxford during a time when relations between the countries were still strained.

Along with Pamela Morris she founded the Oxford English Centre in 1953, which went on to become St Clare's College. She became the sole principal in 1972 and remained in that post until her retirement in 1983. Later she would become the head of the American International School of Florence and then the director of the Oxford Centre for Learning Skills.

Dreydel also helped the disabled by serving on the Committee for the Employment of Disabled People for Oxfordshire and Berkshire.
