= Yeats Annual =

Yeats Annual is a book series about W. B. Yeats. The project was started by Richard J. Finneran, who edited the first two volumes and had them published by Macmillan. Despite its name, the series is not published annually.

== Volumes ==
- No. 1 (1982)
- No. 2 (1983)
- No. 3 (1985)
- No. 4 (1986)
- No. 5 (1987)
- No. 6 (1988)
- No. 7 (1990)
- No. 8 (1991)
- No. 9 Yeats and Women, A Special Number (1992)
- No. 10 (1993)
- No. 11 (1994)
- No. 12 That Accusing Eye: Yeats and his Irish (1996)
- No. 13 (1998)
- No. 14 Yeats and the Nineties: A Special Number (2001)
- No. 15 Yeats's Collaborations: A Special Number (2002)
- No. 16 Poems and Contexts: A special Number (2005)
- No. 17 Influence and Confluence: A Special Number (2007)
- No. 18 A Special Edition: Essays in Memory of A. Norman Jeffares (2013)
- No. 19 A Special Edition: Yeats's Mask (2013)
- No. 20 Essays in Honour of Eamonn Cantwell (2016)
