= Amy Horrocks =

English pianist and composer (1867–1919)

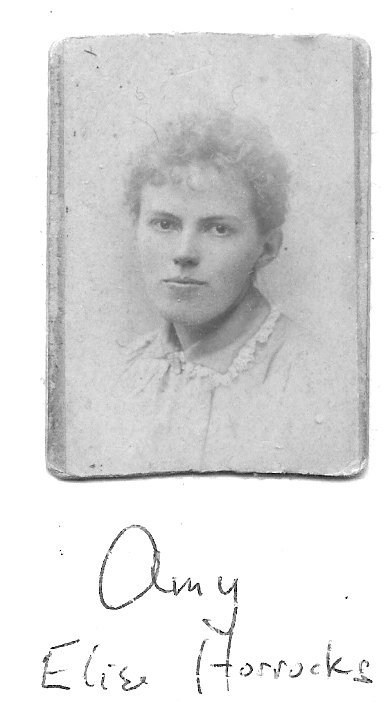

Amy Elise (Note: Although frequently referred to in text books as Amy Elsie (for example British Musical Biography: A Dictionary of Musical Artists, Authors and Composers, born in Britain and its Colonies, by James Brown and Stephen Stratton, S.S. Stratton, Birmingham, (1897), Women's Work in Music by Arthur Elson, L. C. Page & Company, Boston (1903), Women Composers: A Handbook by Susan Stern, Scarecrow Press, London (1978), Women composers : A Checklist of Works for the Solo Voice by Miriam Stewart-Green, G.K. Hall & Co., Boston (1980) and The New Grove Dictionary of Women Composers by Julie Anne Sadie (ed.), London: Macmillan, (1995)), her birth certificate lists her name as Amy Eliza and her marriage certificate, Amy Elise.) Horrocks (23 February 1867 – 4 December 1919) was an English music educator, composer (particularly of songs) and pianist. She had a close association with the Royal Academy of Music as a student, teacher, and Fellow. She enjoyed a degree of professional success, including several performances of her work at the Proms.

== Early life ==
=== Childhood ===
Amy Horrocks was born on 23 February 1867 to English parents, Francis James Horrocks (8 July 1829 – 27 April 1913) and his wife Hannah (née Allen, 1833 – 22 April 1913) in Rio Grande do Sul, Brazil, where it is suggested that Francis Horrocks was constructing tramways. Her early education from the age of about six was at Miss Frances Anne Gregson's Highbury College in Bowdon, Cheshire.

In 1879 the family relocated to London and were living at 35 Bartholomew Road, Kentish Town. Amy joined North London Collegiate School for Girls in May 1880 and was a pupil of Music Master John Blockley, a composer. She left the school in Easter 1882. The school recorded her successes at the Royal Academy of Music, noting her Certificate of Merit for Harmony, Bronze and Silver Medals for Pianoforte, Potter Exhibition and Sterndale Bennett prize. Her song, "At Peep of Dawn" was performed at the school concert in 1897 and her Collection of Two-Part Songs was bought for the library in 1902.

=== Education ===
By 1881, the family were living at 17 Goldhurst Terrace in Hampstead. From 1882, she studied piano and composition under the pianist Adolf Schlösser and the musician Francis William Davenport at the Royal Academy. In 1883 she won prizes in piano and French at the Royal Academy. In 1885 she won the Academy's silver medal for piano and a bronze medal for harmony.

From 1886 to 1888, she took part in student concerts at St James's Hall. In 1888, her "The Return of May" was performed in the Steinway Hall. Her "Variations for pianoforte, violin, viola and violincello" was performed in St James's Hall in 1889. Also in 1889, she won the Academy's Sterndale Bennett prize.

By 1891, she was a Professor of Music; she was elected as an Associate of the Academy in 1890 and as a Fellow in 1895. She won the Potter Exhibition prize in 1888 and the Sterndale Bennett Prize in 1889.

== Career ==
=== Composer and performer ===
From 1891, Horrocks's works were performed around Britain, such as at the Prince's Hall. Her "Sonata in G, for piano and violincello" was praised by The Musical Times. Other works performed early in her career include "The Return of May"; "Bonnie Wee Thing" (words by Robert Burns) "An Idyll of New Years Eve"; "A Midsummer Song"; "Berceuse in F. Waltz in C"; "Four Songs in Two Books "When Mortals are at Rest"; "Six Songs, Two Fairy Songs for Treble Voices and Six Pieces for Piano"; "The Skylark's Wooing, Hill Tops"; "On a Nankin Plate"; and "The Bird and The Rose" (words by Robert Smythe Hichens, 1895). The song features in many contemporary reports from concerts around Britain by Horrocks, and from covers by other performers.

A performance of her "Eight Variations" features at another St James's Hall concert, conducted by Royal Academy principal Alexander MacKenzie on 27 February 1893.

She continued to perform as a pianist and became a teacher at the Academy. She served as one of the Academy's examiners for the 1893 and 1897 Hine Exhibition Prize for composition and the 1896 Robert Cocks Prize for piano playing. One of her songs ("To Music To Becalm His Fever") featured at the Academy's annual prize giving in 1894 and two of her duets, "April Showers" and "The Skylark's Wooing", at an Academy concert in 1898.

Amy performed Antonín Dvořák and one of her own piano compositions in 1894, and featured as soloist and composer at a Birmingham Chamber Concert. She contributed to a collection of Artistic Songs, published by Robert Cocks & Co. Her song "Holly" was performed in 1895. A concert by the D'Oyly Carte singer Esther Palliserconsists entirely of works by female composers including Horrocks and Clara Schumann. Horrocks composed two songs, "Garden Voices" and "Lullaby" for a performance by the singer Marian McKenzie in 1895. Horrocks accompanied the Russian pianist Wassily Sapellnikoff at the Steinway Hall performing two of her duets, "The Night Has a Thousand Eyes" and "A Flower".

The singer Rosa Leo performed Horrocks's "Lullaby" at an 1895 recital at the Steinway Hall. Horrocks's songs feature at three more Rosa Leo concerts in 1896. The first Steinway Hall event on 3 March includes "The Night Has a Thousand Eyes" and "A Flower". At later concerts in the series, "Forget-me-not" and "The Answer" were sung.

=== The London Ballad Concerts ===
Horrocks was performed at a concert in 1896 and her song, "A Romany Spring Song" featured in the annual Wilhelm Ganz concert. Two more of Horrocks's songs ("The Bird and the Rose" and "My Pretty Jane") were performed by Jack Robertson as part of a 1896 London Ballad Concert, sponsored by Boosey & Co.; these were followed by "Romany Spring Song" at a Queen's Hall Ballad Concert in 1897. "The Bird and the Rose" features in a Queen's Hall Ballad Concert later in 1897, performed by Edwardian actress, Georgina Delmar, and again at a Ballad Concert in 1898. Horrocks appeared at an 1898 Ballad Concert and later occasions accompanying Ellen Bowick in Tennyson's "The Lady of Shalott" to Horrocks's accompaniment of violin, cello and piano.

=== Success ===
One of her pieces, "Sing Heigh-ho!", was performed by Australian contralto Ada Crossley at a Ballad concert in December 1898; her work was also performed at a recital given by the English operatic soprano and contralto, and occasional pianist, Greta Williams.

She played the piano in 1899 at the Salle Erard in London, accompanying Hungarian cellist Dezso Kordy. Kordy performrf two of Amy's pieces. During this period, she also worked as a music teacher.

Three of her Six Greek Love Songs were premiered by the baritone Frederick Keel (to whom the collection is dedicated) at the Steinway Hall in May 1899, and her duet for female voices, "Harebell Curfew" was performed later that year. She produced two new songs, "To Violets" and "July the Pedlar". The English contralto, (Louise) Kirkby Lunn performed Amy's "Bonnie Wee Thing", while Horrocks accompanied Rhoda Wiley in her vocal recital, including "To Violets" and "July the Pedlar", at the Steinway Hall. Another of her vocal compositions, "Prithee Maiden", was performed at the end of the year.

Amy's piece, "The Hotspur" was performed by Scottish baritone Andrew Black at the 1900 Ballad Concert. Two of her Greek Love Songs reappeared in 1900 at a concert given by Florence Bulleid accompanied by Horrocks. Her songs featured in a concert by the American baritone David Bispham.

=== Sir Henry Wood and the Proms ===
It is alleged that Amy was proposed to by Sir Henry Wood; they were students together, and she had nicknamed him "Grubby Wood". Whatever relationship she had with Wood came to nothing, as he wrote in his 1938 autobiography that "I have now quite lost sight of Amy Elise Horrocks".

In the early days of the Promenade concerts when Robert Newman presented Saturday-only concerts in the early spring of 1896/7, Horrocks appears on the bill for the Prom under the baton of Henry Wood. Amy "was twice called to the platform after the first performance of her 'orchestral legend' Undine" on 6 February 1897. She and the piece were praised in the press. Her success in the proms encouraged speculation in multiple newspapers on whether she would produce new work for the next season of concerts.

Her second proms appearance was a year later, with her fresh composition "Romaunt of the Page"; it had its world premiere on 6 October 1899.

=== After marriage ===
'The Bird and the Rose' was performed many times in England, Scotland, Wales, Ireland, and the Channel Islands. It was mentioned as one of the popular songs of the time (meaning the Victorian era of Arthur Sullivan, as in Gilbert and Sullivan) (Simpson 1910).

Husband and wife Ethel Barns and Charles Philips included one of Horrocks 's songs in their Bechstein Hall Chamber Concert. Her cello piece "Twilight" was performed in 1902. Two of her duets, "To Violets" and "July the Pedlar" were performed in 1902, and in several 1903 concerts. "July the Pedlar" features in a 1906 concert by American opera singer Margaret Crawford and in concerts in 1909 by other performers.

Her new compositions in 1903 include "Forget Me Not" and 'An Idle Poet". They were followed by settings of Nash's "The Sweet Spring" and "Weep you no more, sad fountains". Her songs continued to appear at the Ballad Concerts, performed by Kirkby Lunn in 1914. New compositions "My Little House" and "The Baby Child of Mary" appear in 1914/15. The English contralto Marguerite d'Alvarez performs Horrocks's work in 1914.

== Personal life ==
Horrocks had two children, Jean in 1904 and Pamela in 1906 (Norrington 2006).

=== Le Drapeau Bleu ===
Amy and Nico wrote to each other frequently during the nineteen years of their engagement and marriage from September 1900 to June 1919. "We know that Mother and Father write to each other every day … Father's letters often begin 'Dear Girl' and end 'Your loving husband Nico'" (Norrington 2006). In 1919 their letters cover Amy's composition of a song, which went through various iterations, often with Nico suggesting lyrics and advising on French grammar. Amy enters the song, which became "Le Drapeau Bleu", into a competition run by the French newspaper L'Oeuvre to compose a song to celebrate the end of the First World War and the establishment of a Society or League of Nations, as proposed by US President Wilson, which had chosen a blue flag as its symbol.

Even though The Blind Horse of Corfu gives the impression that Nico destroyed the song, "… a 'Song for Peace' which had apparently won an important prize" (Norrington 2006), obituaries in The Stage and, suffragette newspaper, The Vote announcing Amy's death both report that "shortly before her death a jury of musicians and literary men in Paris had awarded her the prize, open to the world, for a song in honour of the 'Drapeau Bleu' - the ensign of the League of Nations". Le Drapeau Bleu was eventually published in 1920 and was performed by Amy's granddaughter, Nicole Paramythioti one hundred years later, in January 2020 at a concert in Horspath, Oxfordshire organised by Amy's great granddaughter, musician, Isabel Richards to celebrate Amy's life and music. (Note: Other pieces by Amy included in the concert are Elegy for violin and piano, Opus 34 No. 2; The Lady of Shalott for narrator, violin, cello and piano; An Indian Lullaby; An Irish Melody and Country Dance for cello and piano, Opus 17 No, 1; Eight Variations on an Original Theme for violin, viola, cello and piano, Opus 11)

=== Death ===
Horrocks died on 4 December 1919 in Paris and was cremated and initially buried in Cimetière Du Père-Lachaise. Her husband Nico died in 1943 and Amy's ashes were transferred to his resting place at Barbizon, near the Fontainebleau Forest. She is recorded as a Deceased Fellow (under her married name) in the 1929/30 Prospectus for the Royal Academy of Music and Nico as a Subscribing Member. An obituary in The Etude sums up her life: "Amy Elsie [sic] Horrocks, pianist and composer, died lately in Paris. She was born in Brazil, of English parentage. She composed numerous songs, as well as compositions in larger form. Undine, an orchestral tone-poem, had performance at Queen's Hall, London, with success. Her most famous song was The Bird and the Rose".

Nigel Burton summarises her musical career: "Horrocks's work suffer from a lack of musical substance, though her miniatures have a certain delicate charm. Her piano writing is usually derived from the style of Adolf Henselt and Anton Rubinstein; in larger works, however (such as the Cello Sonata and the Eight Variations op. 11 for piano quartet), of the texture is reminiscent of Brahms. She relied heavily on her rhythmic facility and was over-fond of canons. Her most successful piece is the experimental narrative scena with piano trio, The Lady of Shalott."

Horrocks's work continued to be performed for some years after her death. The Royal Academy of Music celebrated its centenary in 1922 with two of her songs. Performances continued around Britain.

== Recorded and published works ==
Horrocks composed music for orchestra, chamber ensemble, choral and solo voice. The Bird and the Rose was recorded on a 78 record (Victrola (64751) by Herbert Witherspoon in 1917. Some of her other works have been issued on CD, including:

- Catherine Wilmers, Simon Marlow: A Cello Century of British Women Composers (22 August 2000) Quicksilva Records, ASIN: B00004U5FS
- Alexandra Mackenzie & Ingrid Sawers: Beyond Twilight: Music for Cello & Piano By Female Composers (20 October 2023) Delphian DCD34306
- Catherine Wilmers, Jill Morton: Cello Sonata, Op. 7, on A Cello Galaxy of British Women Composers, Divine Art DDX 21134 (2025)

Copies of many of her compositions are held at the British Library. Selected works include (dates are dates of publication unless better dates are available):-

Date of Publication Unknown

- The Answer [Song]
- A Flower [Song]
- Garden Voices [Song]
- Holly [Song]
- My Pretty Jane [Song]
- Short Exercises on Sight-reading [Song]
- Wild Swans [Cantata]

1886

- The Return of May. Choral Trio for female voices, with pianoforte accompaniment. Words by Mrs Hemans, Lucas, Weber & Co., London 1886

1889

- Sonata for cello and pianoforte, 1889
- An Idyll of New Years Eve, 1889

1890

- Berceuse in F. Op. 4 No. 1. [P. F.], Augener, London 1890
- Waltz in C. Op. 4 No. 2. [P. F.], Augener, London 1890
- Ashes of Roses (words by E. Goodall) and A Love Song of the 17th Century (words by Austin Dobson). With a Primrose (words by T. Carew) and A Cradle Hymn (words from Kingsley's 'Waterbabies') [In 2 keys], R. Cocks & Co., London 1890
- Constant Love. [Song, etc.], Stanley Lucas, Weber & Co., London 1890

1891

- Blow, blow, thou Winter Wind. [Three-part song] Words by Shakespeare, 1891
- A Serenade. [Three-part song] Words by H.M. Waithman, 1891
- A Midsummer Song. Words by M.C. Gillington [In C minor and D minor], Stanley Lucas, Weber & Co., London 1891
- At Peep of Dawn. [Three-part song] Words by C. Scollard, 1891

1892

- Six Songs. Op. 10, J. Williams, London 1892
- Two Fairy Songs, for treble voices. 1. Elfin Sleep Song, 2. The Fairy Thrall. Words by M. C. Gillington. Op. 13, J. Williams, London 1892

1893

- When Mortals are at Rest, etc., published 1893
- Eight Variations on an original Theme for pianoforte, violin, viola and cello. Op. 11, J. Williams, London 1893
- Cradle Song and Scherzo à la Mazurka for violin and piano. Op. 12, J. Williams, London 1893
- Six Pieces for Piano. No. 1. Boat-Song, No. 2. Minuet, No. 3. Romance, No. 4. Spinning-Song, No. 5. Waltz, No. 6. Mazurka. Op. 14, J. Williams, London 1893
- Rose-Song. Words by P.B. Marston, 1893
- A Spring Day. [Song] Words by Wordsworth, 1893
- Christmas Carol. [Song] Words by J. Milton, 1893
- A Dirge for the Year. [Song] Words by P.B. Shelley, 1893
- A Garden. [Song] Words by P.B. Shelley, 1893
- To Music, to Becalm his Fever. [Song] Words by R. Herrick, 1893

1894

- Irish Melody and Country Dance for violoncello and piano. Op. 17 No. 1, J. Williams, London 1894
- Bloom, O my Rose. [Two-part song] Words by W.S. Landor. Op. 18 No. 1, 1894
- Love's Requiem. [Song with violoncello obbligato] Words by M.C. Gillington, J. Williams 1894

1895

- Bitter for Sweet. [Two-part song] Words by C. Rossetti. Op. 18 No. 3, 1895
- Summer Changes. [Song] Words by P.B. Marston, 1895
- A Lullaby. [Song] Words by Mrs G. Byron, J. Williams, London 1895
- My Love will ne'er forsake me. [Irish Love Song] Words by Mrs. G. Byron, J. Williams, London 1895
- The Bird and the Rose. [Song] Words by R.S. Hichens, Boosey & Co., London & New York 1895
- Bonnie Wee Thing. [Song] Words by R. Burns, Boosey & Co., London & New York 1895
- The Skylark's Wooing. [Two-part song] Words by M.C. Gillington. Op. 23 No. 1, Augener & Co, London 1895
- April Showers. [Two-part song] Words by M.C. Gillington. Op. 23 No. 2, Augener & Co, London 1895
- Hill-Tops. [Two-part song] Words by M.C. Gillington. Op. 23 No. 3, Augener & Co, London 1895

1896

- Sonata in G for pianoforte and violoncello. Op. 7, J. Williams, London 1896
- Another Spring. [Two-part song] Words by C. Rossetti. Op. 18 No. 5, 1896
- On the Pond. [Two-part song] Words by F. Schloesser. Op. 18 No. 6, 1896
- On a Nankin Plate. [Song] Words by A. Dobson, Chappell & Co., London 1896
- Prithee, Maiden. [Song] Words by S. Lever, Boosey & Co., London & New York 1896
- A Romany Spring Song. Words by M. Byron, Boosey & Co., London & New York 1896

1897

- Undine, Op. 16 for orchestra, 1897
- The Nightingale. [Song] Words by F.E. Weatherly, Boosey & Co., London & New York 1897
- Slumber Song of the Year. [Two-part song] Words by M. Byron, 1897
- Ragged Robin. [Two-part song] Words by M. Byron, 1897
- Piano Trio in B flat, published 1897

1898

- The Winds. A Cantata for treble voices. Words by M.C. Gillington. (German words by W. Kastner). Op. 22, J. Williams, London 1898
- The Fairy Cobbler. [Two-part song for female voices] Words by M.C. Gillington, Augener & Co, London 1898
- Tragedy. [Two-part song for female voices] Words by M.C. Gillington, etc., Augener & Co, London 1898
- Amoret. [Song]. Words by M. Byron, Boosey & Co., London & New York 1898
- The Recompense. [Song with violoncello accompaniment] Words by M. Byron, Boosey & Co., London & New York 1898
- Sing Heigh-ho! [Song] Words by C. Kingsley, etc., Boosey & Co., London & New York 1898

1899

- Romaunt of the Page, A Ballade published 1899
- Elfin Sleep Song [Three-part song], etc., 1899
- The Night has a Thousand Eyes. [Canon] Words by F.W. Bourdillon, 1899
- The Fairy Thrall. [Four-part song], etc., 1899
- Harebell Curfew. [Duet for female voices.] Words by M. Byron, Augener & Co, London 1899
- Spring in the Forest. [Two-part song for female voices, with pianoforte accompaniment] Words by M. Byron, Augener & Co, London 1899
- Six Greek Love Songs, Boosey & Co., London & New York 1899
- Golden Eyes [Song.] Words by A. Lang, Boosey & Co., London & New York 1899
- An Indian Lullaby. [Song] Words by M.C. Gillington, etc., Houghton & Co., London 1899
- July the Pedlar. [Vocal duet] Words by N. Hopper, Chappell & Co., London 1899
- The Season for Wooing. [Song] Words by G.S. Aspinall, Chappell & Co., London 1899
- A Spanish Pastoral. Spanisches Schäferlied. [Song with flute obbligato] Words by M. Byron, German translation by O.L. Sturm, J. Williams, London 1899
- To Violets. [Vocal duet] Words by M. Byron, Chappell & Co., London 1899
- The Lady of Shalott. Words by Tennyson with pianoforte accompaniment, Boosey & Co., London & New York 1899
- The Lady of Shalott. Words by Tennyson with musical accompaniment for violin, violoncello and pianoforte, Boosey & Co., London & New York 1899

1900

- Trois Pièces faciles pour violon avec accompagnement de piano. No. 1. Barcarolle. No. 2. Élégie. No. 3. Masjurka. Op. 34, Schott & Co., London 1900
- The Daisy. [Two-part song for female voices, with pianoforte accompaniment] Words by Wordsworth, Augener & Co, London 1900
- Sweet Dreams. - Cradle Song. - [Duet for female voices] Words by W. Blake, Augener & Co, London 1900
- The Hotspur. [Song] Words by M. Byron, Boosey & Co., London & New York 1900
- Lady Moon. [Song] Words by M. Byron, Boosey & Co., London & New York 1900
- To Althea, from Prison [Song] English words by R. Lovelace, German by W.A. Kastner, J. Williams, London 1900
- Rigaudon for violin with pianoforte accompaniment, Augener & Co., London 1900
- 4 Songs. No. 1. My Lady Wind, No. 2. The Shepherd, No. 3. The Babes in the Wood, No. 4. The Lamb, Augener & Co., London 1900
- 4 Songs. No. 1. The Old Woman and her Broom, No. 2. Sleep, Baby, Sleep, No. 3. Cock Robin's Serenade, No. 4. Up in the Morning Early, Augener & Co., London 1900

1901

- Twilight, a Rêverie for violoncello and pianoforte. Taken from 'Songs for Children', J. Williams, London 1901
- 4 Songs. Voice part in Tonic Sol-fa notation, etc., published 1901
- 6 Action Songs. No. 1 The Marching Host, No. 2. The Blue Room, No. 3. The Weathercock, No. 4. The Flowers' Frocks, No. 5. Old Jack Frost, No. 6. The Soldier's Return. Words by M.C. Gillington. In Staff and Tonic Sol-fa Notation, Augener & Co. 1901
- The Return of May. [Choral Trio for female voices, with pianoforte accompaniment, etc.] Augener & Co., London 1901
- The Rigadoon. [Song] Words by M. Byron [In D and F.], Chappell & Co., London 1901

1902

- Six (Nine) Action Songs. No. 1. A Birdie's Plans, No. 2. The Fan Folk, No. 3. The Sleep Fairy, No. 4. Dolly's Distress, No. 5. Impecunious, No. 6. The Beetle and the Dormouse, No. 7. The Flower Circus, No. 8. The Town Mouse and the Country Mouse, No. 9. The Butterfly's Wedding. Words and Actions by M.C. Gillington J. Williams, London 1902–04
- Philomel and the Aloe Flower. [Song] Words by A. Webster, J. Williams, London 1902
- The Sun's the Heart of the Sky. [Song] Words by A. Webster, J. Williams, London 1902

1903

- Two Lyrics. No. 1. Forget-me-not, No. 2. An Idle Poet. Words by H. Robertson, J. Williams, London 1903

1904

- The Dustman. [Song] Words by M. Byron, Boosey & Co., London & New York 1904
- An Indian Lullaby, etc., published 1904
- 4 Songs. No. 1. The Flowers' Mother, No. 2. A Little Spring Song, No. 3. Queen Mab, No. 4. Adventure. Words by M. C. Gillington and T. Hood, Augener, London 1908
- The Sweet Spring. [Duet for female voices] Words by T. Nash, etc., Augener & Co, London 1904
- Weep you no more, sad Fountains. [Duet for female voices] Words anonymous, etc., Augener & Co, London 1904

1905

- Says the Nightingale. [Duet for female voices] Words by M.C. Gillington, Augener, London 1905
- The Dancers. [Two-part song for female voices, with pianoforte accompaniment] Words by M.C. Gillington, Augener, London 1905
- The Blackbird. [Two-part song for female voices, with pianoforte accompaniment] Words by M.C. Gillington, Augener, London 1905
- The Cuckoo. [Duet for female voices] Words by M.C. Gillington, Augener, London 1905
- Mayday Morn. [Duet for female voices] Words by M.C. Gillington, Augener, London 1905

1908

- Child's Talk in April. [Duet for female voices] Words by C. Rossetti, Augener, London 1908
- Forest Slumber Song. [Duet for female voices] Words by M.C. Gillington, Augener, London 1908
- The Daisy Lullaby. [Two-part song] Words by M. Byron, published 1908
- Cottage Cradle Song. [Two-part song.] Words by M. Byron, published 1908

1911

- Picture Story Books. [Action Song] Words by M.C. Gillington, J. Williams, London 1911
- The Discontented Bunny. [Action Song] Words by M.C. Gillington, J. Williams, London 1911
- Travellers' Tales. [Action Song] Words by M.C. Gillington, J. Williams, London 1911

1913

- A Summer Wish. [Two-part song] Words by C. Rossetti, published 1913
- Dead Hope. [Two-part song] Words by C. Rossetti, published 1913
- If I had a Court and Castle. [Irish Love Song] Words by M.C. Gillington, J. Williams, London 1913
- My Love is a slumb'ring Flower. [Song] Words by M.C. Gillington, J. Williams, London 1913

1914

- The Baby Child of Mary. [Spanish Lullaby, etc], Chappell & Co., London, etc 1914
- My Little House. [Song] Words by M. Byron, Chappell & Co., London, etc 1914

1915

- A Tale of the Sea, and Valse. Two light pieces for the pianoforte, Chappell & Co., London, etc 1915

1917

- The Bird and the Rose. [Song for bass voice and orchestra], published 1917

1919

- Le Drapeau Bleu (Chant des Peuples). [Song], Poulalion, Paris 1920
