= Frensham Heights School =

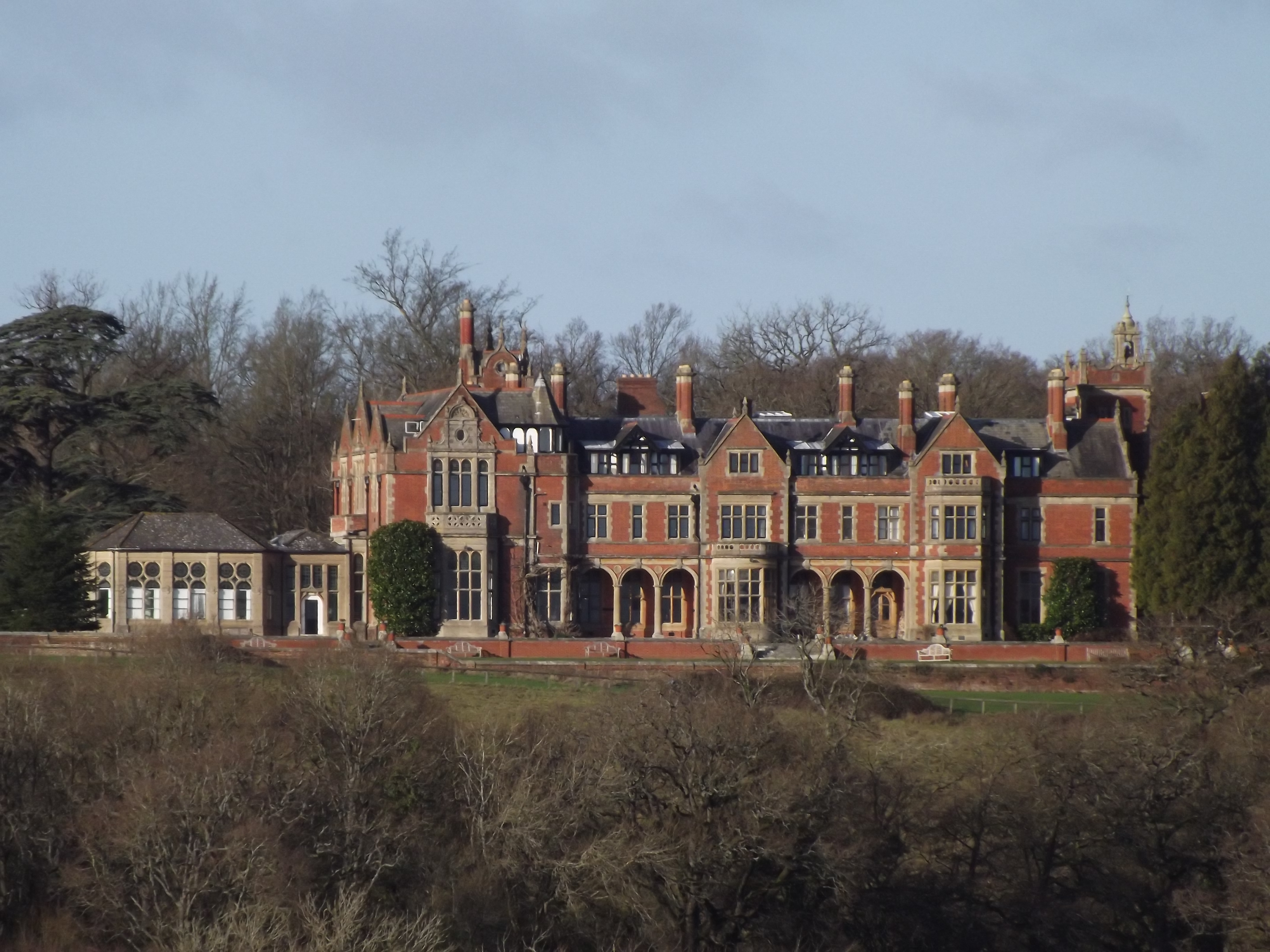

Location
- Rowledge; Farnham, Surrey, GU10 4EA; England; 51.17714°N 0.81151°W

Information
- Type: Private and Sixth form college Day and Boarding
- Motto: Think, Create, Explore
- Established: 1925
- Founder: Edith Douglas-Hamilton
- Local authority: Surrey
- Department for Education URN: 125338 Tables
- Headmaster: Ben McCarey
- Gender: Coeducational
- Age: 3 to 18
- Enrolment: 530~
- Former pupils: Old Frenshamians
- Website: https://www.frensham.org

Frensham Heights School is a private school with a sixth form college located near Farnham, Surrey, England, run by the registered charity, Frensham Heights Educational Trust Ltd. It was founded in 1925 and formed as part of the movement for progressive education. Unlike many HMC member schools, it has been coeducational and has taken both day and boarding pupils since its foundation.

== Foundation and location ==
The school was founded by Edith Douglas-Hamilton, and established under Beatrice Ensor and Isabel King as joint headmistresses. It became firmly established under the headmastership of Paul Roberts (1928–1949) and was recognised as efficient by the Ministry of Education (now the Department for Education) in 1935.

Based at a mock-Tudor mansion, built by the brewer Charles Charrington in 1898, and in its estate, the school is on a hill 2.5 miles (4.0 km) from the centre of Farnham but is actually in the village of Frensham. Its grounds run into Rowledge.

== The Head ==
Ben McCarey began his tenure as the full-time Head of Frensham Heights in September 2024.

== Facilities ==
The school has a professional working theatre called the Aldridge Theatre, with a capacity of 300, which is used for both internal and external performances. It also has an independent sixth form centre, which is separated from the rest of the school, and a music centre.

== Notable alumni ==
Ex-pupils (Old Frenshamians) include:

- Nikki Amuka-Bird, actress
- Hugo Blick, filmmaker
- Edward Davenport, fraudster
- Jack Dee, comedian
- Hannah Gavron, sociologist
- Will Hodgkinson, writer
- Charlotte Hough (née Woodyadd), author and illustrator
- Rufus Hound, comedian
- Francis Huxley, anthropologist and writer
- James Irvine, designer
- Tony Knowland, professor
- Sir Thomas Legg, civil servant
- Nick Mason, drummer
- Hattie Morahan, actor
- Jon Pertwee, actor famous for Doctor Who
- Wolf Rilla, film director
- Sam Roddick, businesswoman
- Henry Smith, former Member of Parliament for Crawley
- Jim Sturgess, actor and musician
