= The Diary of a Country Priest =

Classic French novel

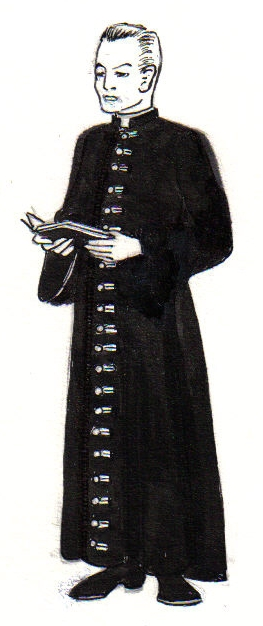
- Author: Georges Bernanos
- Original title: Journal d'un curé de campagne
- Translator: Pamela Morris
- Language: French
- Publisher: Plon
- Publication date: 1936
- Publication place: France
- English publication date: 1937
- Pages: 254

The Diary of a Country Priest (French: Journal d'un curé de campagne) is a 1936 novel by the French writer Georges Bernanos. The novel received the Grand Prix du roman de l'Académie française. In 1950 it was named one of the twelve best novels in the French language published between 1900 and 1950. It was the basis for the 1951 film Diary of a Country Priest, directed by Robert Bresson.

The book was first published in English in 1937 in a translation by Pamela Morris.

== Synopsis ==
The story is set in Ambricourt in northern France, where a young, newly appointed Catholic priest struggles with stomach pains and the lack of faith within his parish. He knows he is weak, inferior, and sometimes thinks himself touched by madness, but strongly believes that the grace of God passes through his priesthood: "All is grace!".

The diary is divided into three parts:

- In the first, the young priest describes his arrival in his parish in the north of France and his first experiences with the poor population.
- The second is about daily life in the parish. The priest describes his encounters with different people and the results of his work. He fails to fulfill his duty, and it is only during a crisis in the local palace that he succeeds in convincing the Countess of the existence of God. This conversation with the Countess is the culmination of the novel. She finds herself in a fatal situation and dies a day later.
- The last part deals with the stay and the death of the priest in Lille after a medical examination.
