= Greta Williams =

English contralto (1869–1964)

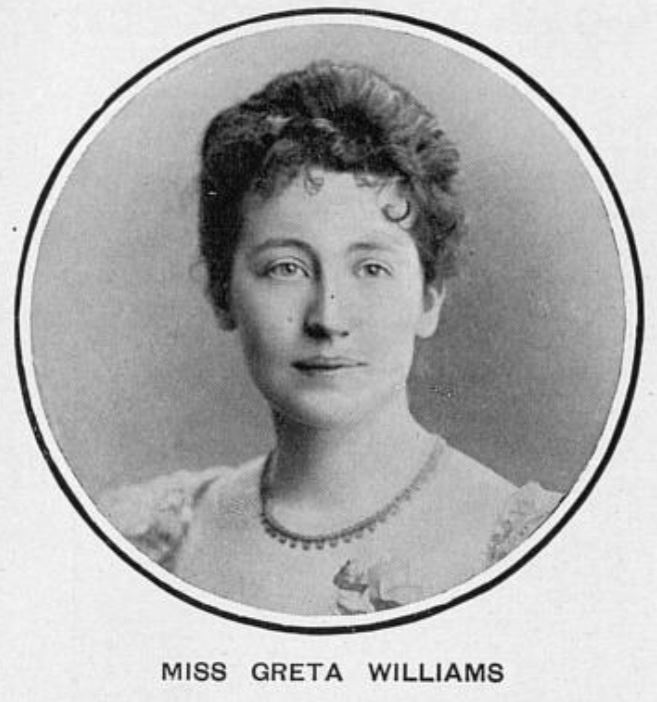
- Miss Greta Williams, pictured in The Tatler, 2 April 1902

Background information
- Born: Ada Margrethe; Kensington
- Occupation: Singer

Ada Margrethe (Greta) was born in Kensington London on 9 January 1869, the daughter of Danish-born Florentine Margrethe née Bentsen (1833–1921), a nurse, and Robert Henry Williams (1833–1920), a coal merchant. She was a piano prodigy before her voice developed. In 1886 she entered the Royal Academy of Music in London where she studied singing with Edwin Holland and Alberto Randegger. She also studied harmony and composition with F.W. Davenport and George Alexander Macfarren. In 1887 she performed at a memorial concert for George Alexander Macfarren, principal of the RAM from 1875 – 1887.

Whilst at the Royal Academy of Music she was a Westmoreland Scholar and was the first recipient of the Rutson Memorial Prize (July 1890). The competition was adjudicated by Harry Plunket Greene and Antoinette Sterling. She also received her Certificate of Merit, the highest award of the academy, in 1889.

Williams became a celebrated English operatic soprano and contralto and made numerous appearances, both as an instrumentalist and a singer, at the Hallé Concerts, Royal Albert Hall, Queen's Hall and other venues.

She is also remembered as a heroine of the 1899 wreck of the SS Stella, in which 77 people perished. During the 14 hours she and other survivors waited in open boats for their rescuers, she quelled the fears of the passengers and crew by singing "O, Rest in the Lord", an aria from Part II of Mendelssohn's Elijah. Her encounter, with recounts in her own words, is detailed in Chapter 17 of Edward Rowe Snow's book, Women of the Sea.

In July 1899, Williams organised a grand charity concert at the Queen's Hall in aid of the Stella Widows and Orphan Fund. Appearing at the concert were noted performers of the time such as the soprano Evangeline Florence, the pianist Natalia Janotha, the violinist Leonora Jackson McKim and the actor Lewis Waller.

Williams died in April 1964 at her home in Brean, Somerset, aged 95.
