= St Clare's, Oxford =

Coordinates: 51°46′23″N 1°15′49″W

Location
- 139 Banbury Road; Oxford, Oxfordshire, OX2 7AL; England

Information
- Type: Coeducational independent day and boarding school International school
- Established: 1953
- Founders: Anne Dreydel and Pamela Morris
- Local authority: Oxfordshire
- Department for Education URN: 133430 Tables
- Chair of Governors: Jens Tholstrup
- Principal: Duncan Reith
- Age: IB 15–19, Summer 9–17 to and adults 16+
- Enrolment: As of 2025: 289
- Capacity: 318
- Colours: Blue and white
- Website: www.stclares.ac.uk

St Clare's is a coeducational private, international day and boarding college in North Oxford, England. St Clare's is an IB World School, offering the International Baccalaureate Diploma and a Preparatory IB programme, as well as English Language programmes, University Pathway and Gap Year programme, Summer and Short courses, and Teacher Training.

Programmes for adults include the University Foundation Programme, English language, English plus Academic Subjects and an Undergraduate Programme. In the summer months, adults, teenagers and juniors can study English language programmes on three separate sites.

The school is consistently listed in the Top 20 IB Schools in the UK School League Tables from Education Advisers Ltd. In 2026, the average score was 35.4, compared to a world average of 30.9 points.

== History ==
The school was founded in 1952 by Anne Dreydel and Pamela Morris, and grew out of a scheme to establish links between British and European students after the Second World War. Its mission is to advance international education and understanding.

The original name was The Oxford English Centre for Foreign Students, which later became St Clare's Hall, and then St Clare's, Oxford.

Links with universities in the USA date back to the 1960s. Formal agreements by which American university students could gain credit towards their US degrees by studying abroad at St Clare's started in the 1970s. Such programmes gradually replaced the University of London external degrees that had previously been offered.

From its original base on 141 Banbury Road, the College has grown to allow more teaching space and a wider range of subject choices. Early homestay arrangements were largely replaced with residential accommodation, as new houses in the area were acquired and refurbished. In 1999, the College bought the Oxford Academy English Language School in Bardwell Road, which became the centre for all adult programmes.

The main campus building and reception is at 139 Banbury Road, in the Summertown suburb of North Oxford.

== Campus ==
St Clare's is located in the North Oxford Conservation Area on two sites – the Banbury Road Campus (No. 139, between Lathbury Road and Moreton Road) and the Bardwell Road Campus (No. 3). It occupies 28 Victorian and Edwardian houses to which purpose-built facilities have been added. At the Banbury Road Campus these include a library building, a careers and university counselling centre, four science laboratories completed in 2014, an art studio completed in 2015, a music studio, dining room and café. Adult students are based at the International College located at the Bardwell Road Campus which is made up of classrooms, a common room, activities office, gardens and student bedrooms.

Students live in college houses close to the college, under the care of residential staff. Adult students can also choose to live with hosts in Oxford.

== International Baccalaureate ==
In the most recent Ofsted inspection of the IB World School, St Clare's was awarded "outstanding", the highest rating, for the quality of its boarding.

Inspectors (Independent Schools Inspectorate) awarded St Clare's a 'significant strength' for the 'harmonious and international college community', a recognition given to only a small percentage of ISI-inspected schools in the UK.

St Clare's offers a range of languages to study at A1 Literature level. Students must study 6 subjects, 3 at Higher Level and 3 at Standard Level. Every student must study one subject from Groups 1 - 5. The sixth subject option can be chosen either from group 6 or from one of the previous groups.

== English Language programmes ==
Adult English Language programmes run throughout the academic year, from September to June. Programmes run from 2 weeks to one academic year; 25 lessons per week, as well as online one-to-one tuition. Courses include English for Life, English for Examinations (which covers IELTS and Cambridge examination preparation) and English plus Academic Subjects. There is also the option to take Personal Language Training.

Students who wish to apply to university in the UK, USA and Europe can take the 28/35-week University Foundation Programme.

Students with advanced level English are able to study a programme which combines English language classes with academic subjects taught at university level. These academic subjects are a part of the Undergraduate Programme. This course is for students who wish to take a Gap Year as part of their US degree, build their academic literacies for further study or learn a new academic subject.

== Notable former pupils ==
- Andrea Agnelli, businessman and chairman of Italian football club Juventus FC
- Sally Brampton, journalist, writer, and magazine editor
- Anji Hunter, Baroness Hunter of Auchenreoch, Labour peer
- Cristina Odone, journalist, editor, and writer
- Katharina Otto-Bernstein, German-American filmmaker
- Ragnar Tørnquist, game designer and author
- Deborah Warner, director of theatre and opera
