= The Journal of Commonwealth Literature =

Academic journal established in 1966

- Discipline: Literature
- Language: English
- Edited by: Claire Chambers, Susan Watkins

Publication details
- History: 1966-present
- Publisher: SAGE Publications
- Frequency: Quarterly

Standard abbreviations
- ISO 4: J. Commonw. Lit.

Indexing
- ISSN: 0021-9894
- LCCN: 65009987
- OCLC no.: 47091524

Links
- Journal homepage; Online access; Online archive

The Journal of Commonwealth Literature (JCL) is a quarterly peer-reviewed academic journal that covers the field of literature, especially Commonwealth and postcolonial literatures, including colonial discourse and translational studies. The journal's editors-in-chief are Claire Chambers (University of York) and Rachael Gilmour (Queen Mary University of London). Alastair Niven was the main articles editor from 1978 to 1991. He was succeeded in the role by its longest serving editor, John Thieme (University of Hull; London South Bank University), who was editor-in-chief from 1992 to 2011.

It was established in 1966 by Norman Jeffares and Arthur Ravenscroft at Heinemann. In 1970, JCL began being published by Oxford University Press. Hanz Zell became the publisher of JCL in 1979. Zell was acquired by K. G. Saur Verlag the following year. After Saur was acquired by Reed International in 1987, its British division was merged with the British holdings of sister publisher R. R. Bowker to form Bowker-Saur. Cambridge Information Group acquired Bowker-Saur in 2001. JCL has been published by SAGE Publications since 2003.

== Abstracting and indexing ==
The Journal of Commonwealth Literature is abstracted and indexed in:

- Academic Search Premier
- Arts and Humanities Citation Index
- Current Contents/Arts & Humanities
- Humanities Index
- Periodicals Content Index
- Scopus
