= Pamela Morris =

- Born: 10 November 1906; France
- Died: 20 October 2002 (aged 95); Burford, Oxford, England
- Citizenship: United Kingdom
- Occupations: Publisher; Teacher
- Years active: 1930s–1972
- Organizations: Boriswood; St Clare's, Oxford
- Spouse: John Morris (m. 1925)
- Children: 2

Pamela Morris (10 November 1906 – 20 October 2002) was an English publisher and teacher who co-founded the publishing firm Boriswood with her husband, John Morris, and their friend Cecil Greenwood and later Oxford English Centre with Anne Dreydel in 1953 (now called St Clare's, Oxford). She translated Diary of a Country Priest by Georges Bernanos and published Archibald MacLeish's Land of the Free. Morris taught English as a second or foreign language at St Clare's as well as French and English literature and administered the school's courses. The St Clare's Science and Mathematics building opened in 2017 was named after her.

== Biography ==
On 10 November 1906, Morris was born in Neuilly-sur-Seine, Paris, France. She was the daughter of Nico Paramythioti, the Greek businessperson, and Amy Horrocks, the English composer. Morris grew up in Paris because her father had business interests in the city, learning to become fluent in both English and French. She went on to establish the publishing firm Boriswood in Surrey with her husband and their friend Cecil Greenwood. The publishing firm was responsible for finding multiple authors such as James Hanley and Rex Warner. Morris translated Diary of a Country Priest by Georges Bernanos and this helped to cement the reputation of the company. She also published Archibald MacLeish's Land of the Free. During the Second World War, the Morrises sold the publishing firm to The Bodley Head and relocated to Oxford.

In Oxford, she taught English as a second or foreign language (EFL), and met Anne Dreydel. The two women established the Oxford English Centre in Banbury Road in 1953 (now called St Clare's, Oxford). Morris continued teaching EFL as well as French, English literature. She also administered every course ran by the centre such as EFL, A-Level programmes, external honours degrees from London and courses for American university students. Morris frequently toured the continent visiting British Council offices and universities promoting the international educational objective of St. Clare's, and continued administered courses at St Clare's until 1960. In 1972, she retired as co-principal of the trust after she and her family moved to Shilton close to Burford. Morris read contemporary novels every week and frequently went to the local library in her final years whilst being cared for by staff at a local nursing home. Her life is chronicled in a memoir 'The Blind Horse of Corfu', written by her daughter Anne Norrington.

== Personal life ==
She was married to John Morris from 1925 until his death in 1985 and the couple had two children. Morris moved to a nursing home in Burford in 1995 and died there on 20 October 2002.

== Legacy ==
The Science and Mathematics building at St Clare's that was designed to complement the existing structure from the Edwardian and Victorian eras opened in 2017 was named for her.
