= Push–pull =

Push–pull may refer to:

== In electronic technology ==
- Push–pull output, type of electronic circuit
- Push–pull converter, in electronics, is a type of DC to DC converter that uses a transformer
- Push–pull connector, an electronic cable connector
- Push technology and Pull technology, in network communications

== In transport technology ==
- Push–pull configuration, on aircraft
- Push–pull train, a train able to be operated by a driver at either end
- Push-to-pull compression fittings, a type of compression fitting that allows air line to be attached without the use of tools

== In other technology ==
- Push processing, and its counterpart "pull processing" in photography
- Push-and-pull enteroscopy, an endoscopic technique for visualization of the small bowel
- Push–pull olefin, in organic chemistry
- Push–pull perfusion, an in vivo sampling method
- Push–pull agricultural pest management a.k.a. Push–pull technology, in farming, an intercropping strategy for controlling agricultural pests

== In the arts ==
=== Music ===
- Push Pull (Hoobastank album), 2018
- Push Pull (Jimmy Lyons album), 1979
- "Push Pull", a song by Purity Ring from the 2015 album Another Eternity

=== Other uses ===
- Hans Hofmann's "push/pull" theory, concerning perceived depth in abstract painting
- Pushmi-pullyu, fictional breed of antelope

== Other uses ==
- Human migration § Push and pull, factors pushing migrants out from home, or pulling them toward a new host
- Push–pull strategy, in logistics, supply chain management and marketing
- Push–pull workout, a type of weight-lifting routine

== See also ==
- Push and pull (disambiguation)
