= Push and pull (disambiguation) =

Push and pull are concepts in supply chain management.

Push and pull or Push & Pull may also refer to:

- "(Do The) Push and Pull", a 1970 soul song
- Push-and-pull enteroscopy, an endoscopic technique for visualization of the small bowel
- Push & Pull, a 2006 album by Blackthorn
- Push & Pull, a 2009 album by Strung-Out Troubadours
- "Push & Pull", a song by Nikka Costa on the 2001 album Everybody Got Their Something
- "Push & Pull", a song by Twice on the 2021 album Formula of Love: O+T=<3
- "Push + Pull", a song by July Talk from their 2016 album Touch

== See also ==
- Push to pull, compression fitting
- Push–pull (disambiguation)
