= Quick connect fitting =

Type of hose or pipe coupling

For hoses and piping, a quick connect fitting, also called a push fitting or Quick Connect Coupling, is a coupling used to provide a fast, make-or-break connection of gas or liquid transfer lines. Operated by hand, quick connect fittings replace threaded or flanged connections, which require wrenches. When equipped with self-sealing valves, quick connect fittings will, upon disconnection, automatically contain any fluid in the line. However, this depends on the type of coupling, such as single shut-off, double shut-off, or straight-through designs, which determine whether fluid retention occurs.

== Uses ==
There is a large variety of quick connect fittings. They are used underwater, in drilling operations, and in outer space, as well as for pneumatic-power, plumbing, heating, electrical, and fire-suppression applications. Quick connect fittings are intended to be applied more easily than traditional fittings, requiring only that the pipes be pushed together firmly to lock the teeth of the fitting firmly. The teeth are forced deeper into the tubing when opposing force is applied to them, preventing their separation from the tubing. An o-ring provides a water-tight and airtight seal.

=== Quick Connect Fittings/couplings ===
Quick connect fittings are used in a wide range of applications, including:

- Underwater systems
- Drilling operations
- Outer space applications
- Pneumatic power systems
- Plumbing
- Heating
- Electrical connections
- Fire suppression systems

=== Pneumatic Couplings ===
Pneumatic couplings are specialized quick connect fittings used for compressed air and gas applications. These couplings allow for fast and secure connections, ensuring efficiency and safety in pneumatic systems. They are designed to minimize pressure drops, prevent air leakage, and provide durability under high-pressure conditions.

==== Industries Using Pneumatic Couplings ====
Pneumatic couplings are widely used across various industries, including:

- Manufacturing: Used in automated machinery and pneumatic tools for assembly lines.
- Automotive: Applied in air-powered tools, tire inflation, and braking systems.
- Aerospace: Essential for aircraft maintenance and pneumatic system operations.
- Medical: Found in oxygen supply systems and pneumatic medical devices.
- Construction: Used in jackhammers, nail guns, and other pneumatic-powered equipment.
- Agriculture: Applied in pneumatic seeders, sprayers, and automated farming tools.

== Types ==
Fittings come in a variety of generic and proprietary types, with market dominance highly dependent on global region.

North America:

- Industrial-type interconnect/interchange, based on military specification MIL-C-4109F.
- ARO-type interconnect/interchange, compact and lightweight fittings developed by ARO (now part of Ingersoll-Rand), mainly for precise pneumatic applications.
- Automotive-type interconnect/interchange, based on a standard set forth by the pneumatic machinery firm Tru-Flate for automotive shops, including tire inflation and pneumatic tools.

Europe:

- European standard, also known as the Highflow European standard.
- British standard

Japan:

- Nitto standard

=== Types of Quick Connect Couplings ===
Pneumatic quick connect couplings come in various designs based on function and industry standards:

- Single Shut-Off Couplings: Have a valve on one side to prevent air loss when disconnected.
- Double Shut-Off Couplings: Both sides contain shut-off valves to minimize air loss.
- Straight-Through Couplings: No valves, allowing unrestricted airflow for maximum efficiency.
- High-Flow Couplings: Designed to maximize air volume transfer, often used in heavy-duty applications.
- ISO Standard Couplings: Comply with international standards for interchangeability.
- Safety Couplings: Include locking mechanisms to prevent accidental disconnection.

== Materials ==
Quick connect couplings are made from various materials, each suited for specific applications based on durability, chemical resistance, and cost. The two primary categories are plastics and metals. The performance, durability, and suitability of the coupling depend on the application and the material from which it is made.

- Plastics (e.g., acetal, polypropylene, nylon, and Polyether ether ketone (PEEK))
  - Lightweight and corrosion-resistant.
  - Ideal for medical, food processing, and chemical applications.
  - Generally more cost-effective than metal alternatives.
  - Less durable under high-pressure or high-temperature conditions.
- Metals (e.g., brass, stainless steel, aluminum)
  - Higher strength and durability.
  - Suitable for high-pressure and high-temperature applications.
  - Corrosion-resistant variants like stainless steel are used in harsh environments.
  - More expensive but provide longer service life.

== Cost ==
Unit cost varies from a few dollars for mass-produced compressed air couplings to $1 million for large-bore couplings used in the ship-to-shore transfer of liquified natural gas.

== See also ==
- Air-line fitting
- Hose coupling
- Fitting
