= F37 =

F37 may refer to:

- F37 (type foundry), a type foundry, based in Manchester, UK.
- HMS Kelvin (F37), a UK Royal Navy K-class destroyer
- HMS Jaguar (F37), a UK Royal Navy Leopard-class anti-aircraft frigate
- INS Beas (F37), an Indian Navy Brahmaputra-class frigate
- Parflange F37, a flange connection for hydraulic tubes and pipes
