= Hironori Yamamoto =

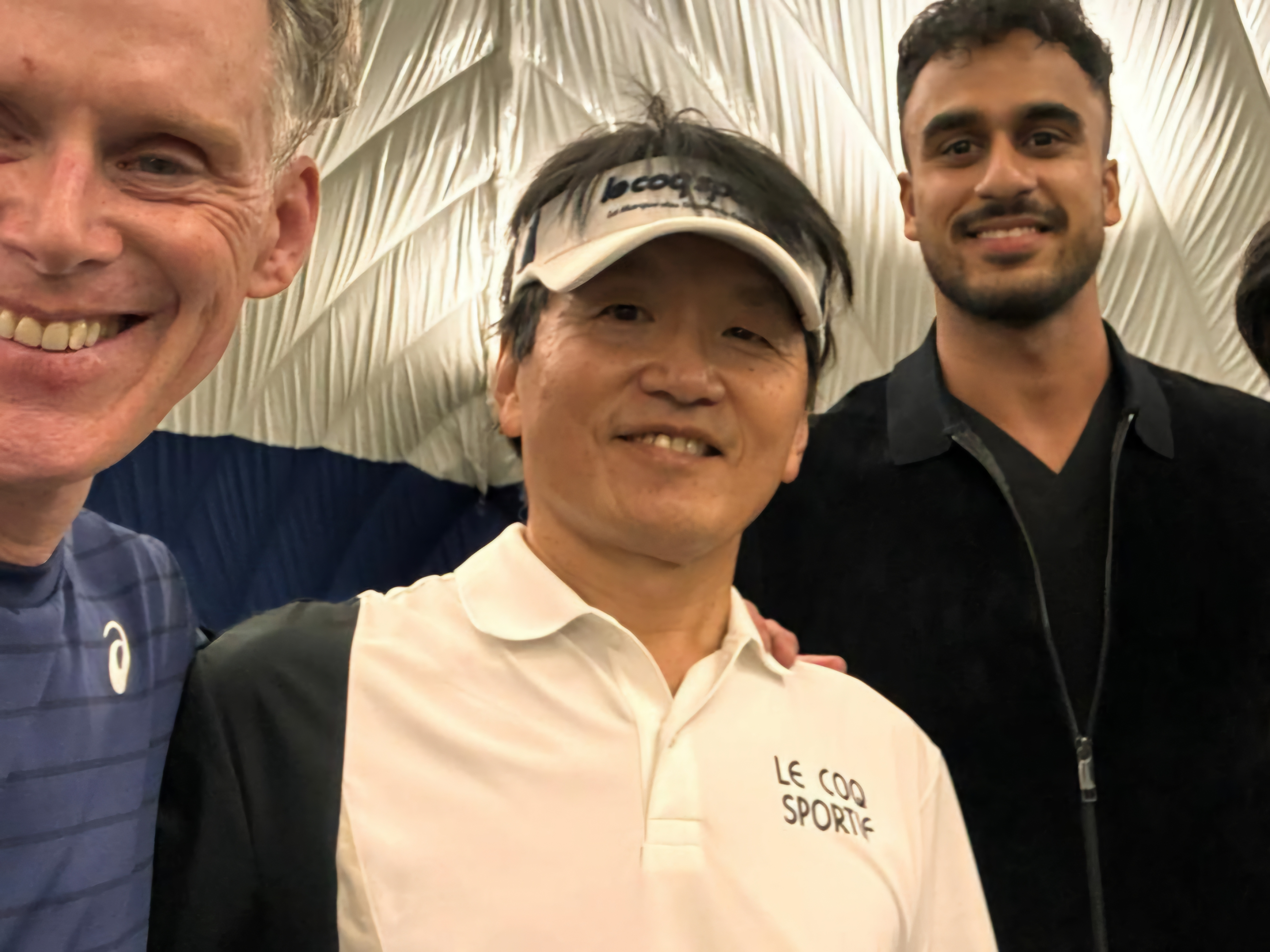
- Born: Japan
- Known for: Inventing double-balloon enteroscopy

Academic background
- Education: Jichi Medical University

Academic work
- Discipline: Gastroenterology
- Institutions: Jichi Medical University

Hironori Yamamoto is a Japanese gastroenterologist and academic best known for inventing double-balloon enteroscopy (DBE), a technique that enables detailed visualization and treatment of the small intestine by endoscopy. His work has significantly advanced the field of endoluminal therapeutic endoscopy.

== Early life and education ==
Yamamoto was born in Japan and completed his medical degree at Jichi Medical University. He later joined the university as a faculty member, focusing his research and clinical efforts on improving endoscopic techniques.

== Career ==
In 2001, Yamamoto developed double-balloon enteroscopy, an endoscopic method that allows examination and intervention throughout the small intestine using an endoscope equipped with two balloons. The technique overcame limitations of conventional endoscopy, which could not access the entire small bowel.

Yamamoto is also recognized for his contributions to endoscopic submucosal dissection (ESD) techniques, which are used to remove gastrointestinal tumors.

== Publications ==
Yamamoto has published extensively in peer-reviewed journals and co-authored the book Double-Balloon Endoscopy: Theory and Practice, which provides a detailed guide to the DBE technique.

== Current position ==
Yamamoto currently serves as professor and chairman at the Department of Medicine, Division of Gastroenterology, Jichi Medical University.

== Recognition ==
Dr. Yamamoto’s innovations have had a lasting impact on the diagnosis and treatment of small intestinal diseases. His pioneering work with DBE has been widely adopted worldwide and remains a critical tool in gastrointestinal endoscopy.
