= Lincoln Industrial =

Industrial corporation heartquartered in the U.S.

Lincoln Industrial Corporation
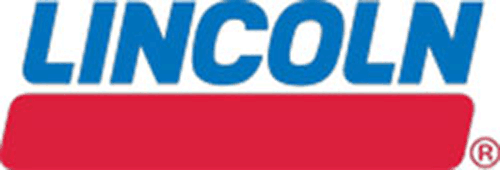
- Type: Private
- Industry: Manufacturing
- Founded: January 14, 1910
- Founder: Frank Barks; Edward Barstow
- Headquarters: Lincoln Industrial Corp. One Lincoln Way (street), St. Louis, Missouri
- Area served: Worldwide
- Products: Automatic Lubrication Systems, Manual Lubrication, and Industrial Pumping Systems
- Number of employees: 2100 (2011)
- Website: www.lincolnindustrial.com

Lincoln Industrial Corporation (Lincoln) is a manufacturer of automated lubrication systems, manual lubrication equipment and industrial pumping systems, and subsidiary of Svenska Kullagerfabriken AB (SKF). Founded in 1910, the company has been responsible for many of the inventions that established modern lubrication practices in automotive maintenance and industry.

== Early history ==
After five years with the Union Pacific Railroad in Nebraska, Frank Barks went to work for the Commonwealth Steel Company in Granite City, Illinois, where his cousin, Clarence L. Howard, was president. Two years later, in January 1910, they recruited several investors and formed the Steel Roof Truss Company in Valley Park, Missouri. The company made tubular steel roof trusses, but showed a first year loss of $3,000. Most of the investors sold their interests to Barks, Howard and Edward H. Barstow.

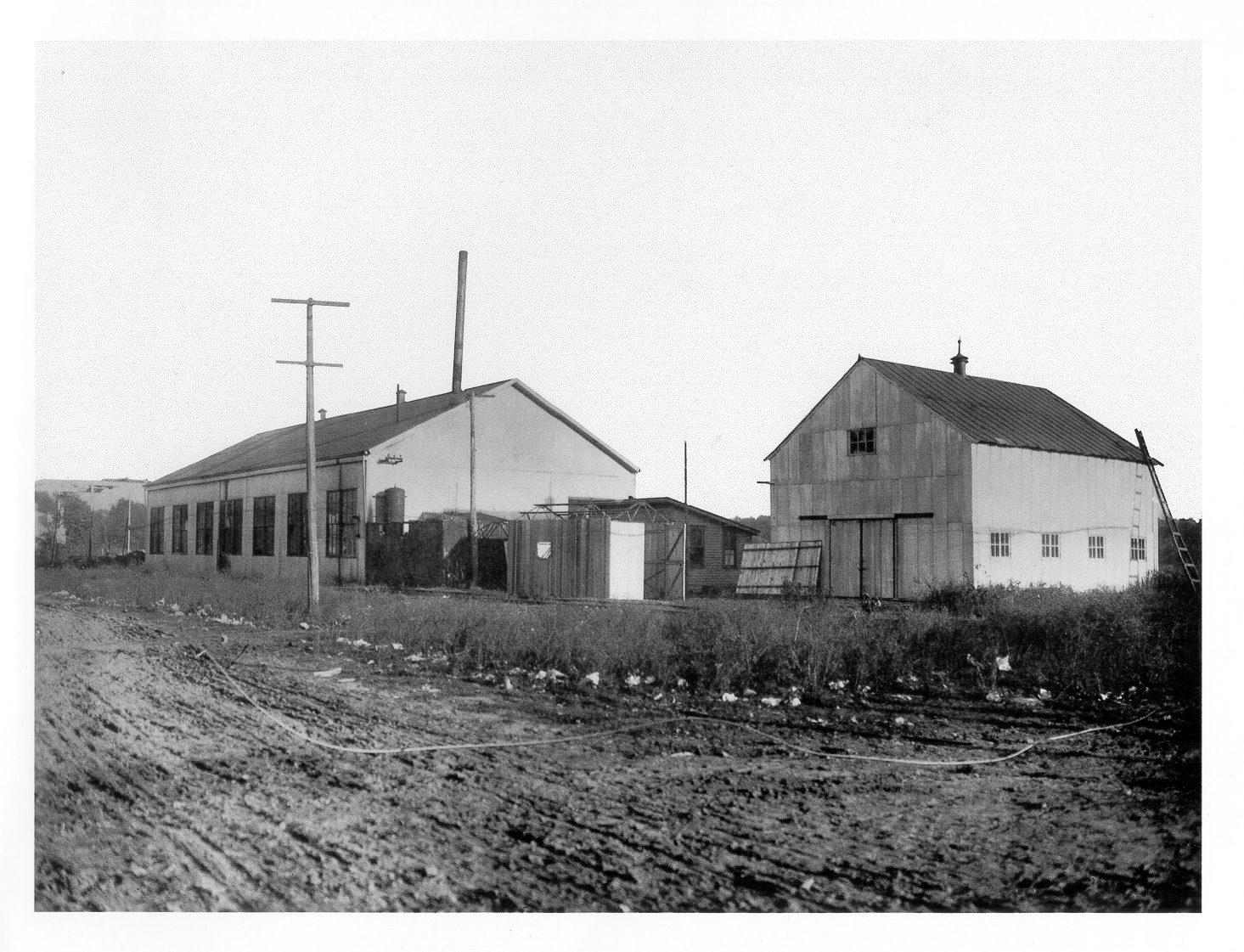
The company's first facilities in 1910.

In October 1912, the company changed its name to Barks and Barstow Manufacturing Company. Expanding their operation, they began making prefabricated steel buildings, barns and cotton gin structures. They hired a 20-year-old, Alex P. Fox, to serve as a draftsman.

In August 1915, the Valley Park location suffered damage from a flood on the Meramac River and two tributaries, Fishpot Creek and Grand Glaize Creek. (Case Study) They began looking for another location for their plant and eventually purchased 4 acres (16,000 m^{2}) of land at Goodfellow and Natural Bridge in north St. Louis for $2,500 per acre. Fox was promoted to assistant treasurer and later to vice president when, in 1916, Clarence Howard resigned and Frank Barks succeeded him as president. The company relocated to 5701 Natural Bridge and changed its name to Lincoln Steel and Forge Company. It was said that Barks named the company after the Civil War president.

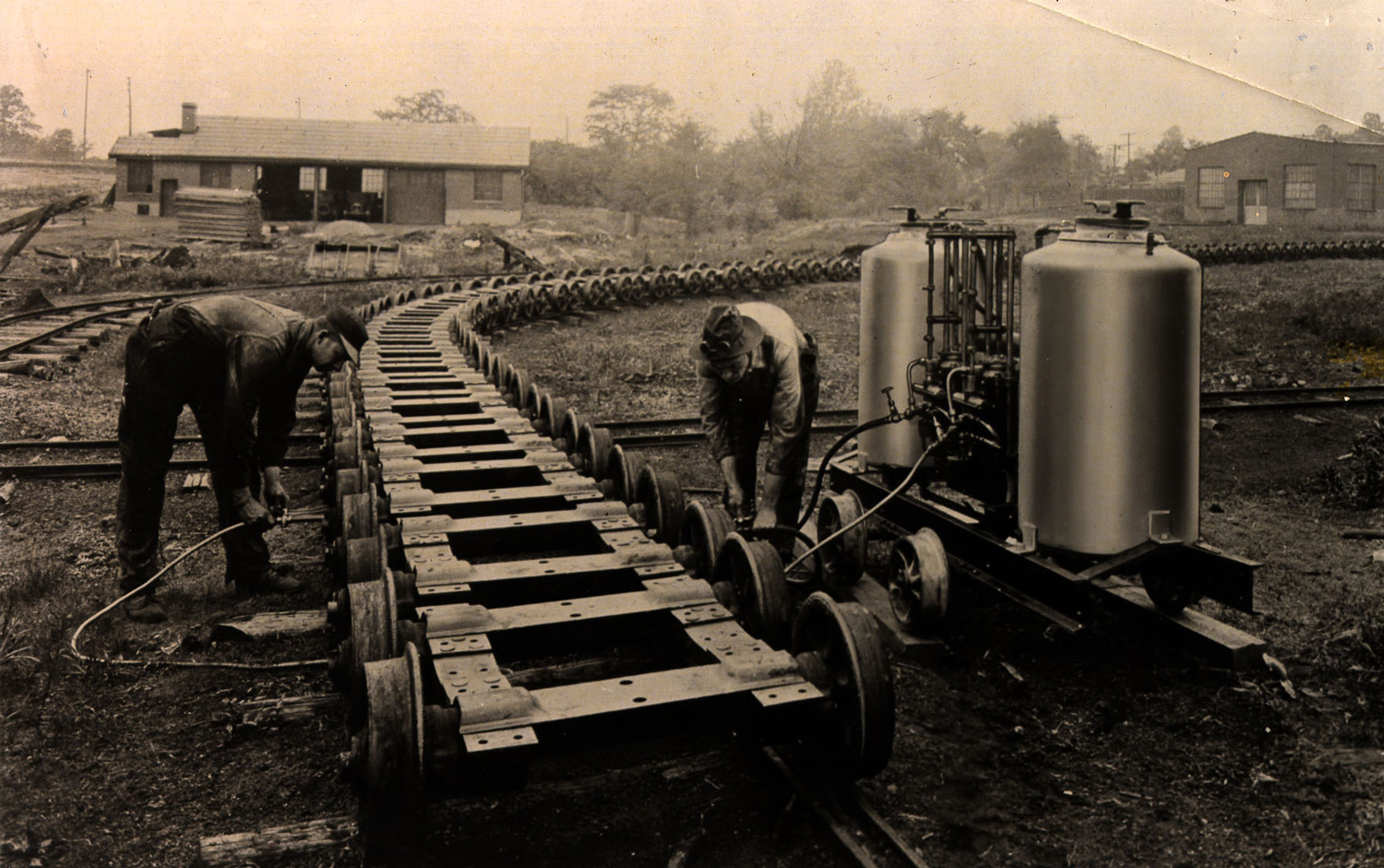
An early lubrication device called a Lubrigun in use on coal car wheels.

Lincoln began to manufacture what became their first principal product – coal mine car frames including the axles using anti-friction bearings supplied by the Hyatt Roller Bearing Company. The company quickly became a standard in the industry. It was the roller bearing designed by Hyatt coupled with Lincoln's design for the car itself that made the product successful.

Continued emphasis on improving productivity in the mines led to the development of the first automatic, power-driven grease gun to be marketed commercially. Used for lubricating the mine cars, the unit included a 400 Lb pressurized tank, one or more hoses and valves that automatically dispensed a predetermined amount of grease. The first Lincoln Lubrigun, introduced in 1923, was mounted on a mine car truck.

=== The Age of The Automobile ===
By 1917, there were already 5 million cars on American roads. (Inventions) As automobile ownership became more prevalent, demand for service stations to do routine maintenance on vehicles was soaring. Lincoln adapted their mine car lubricator to be used by service station mechanics. The P-25 Airline Lubrigun was introduced in 1925. Eight different versions of the Lubrigun were developed for the automobile market. More than 65,000 were sold between 1926 and 1931.(Fox)

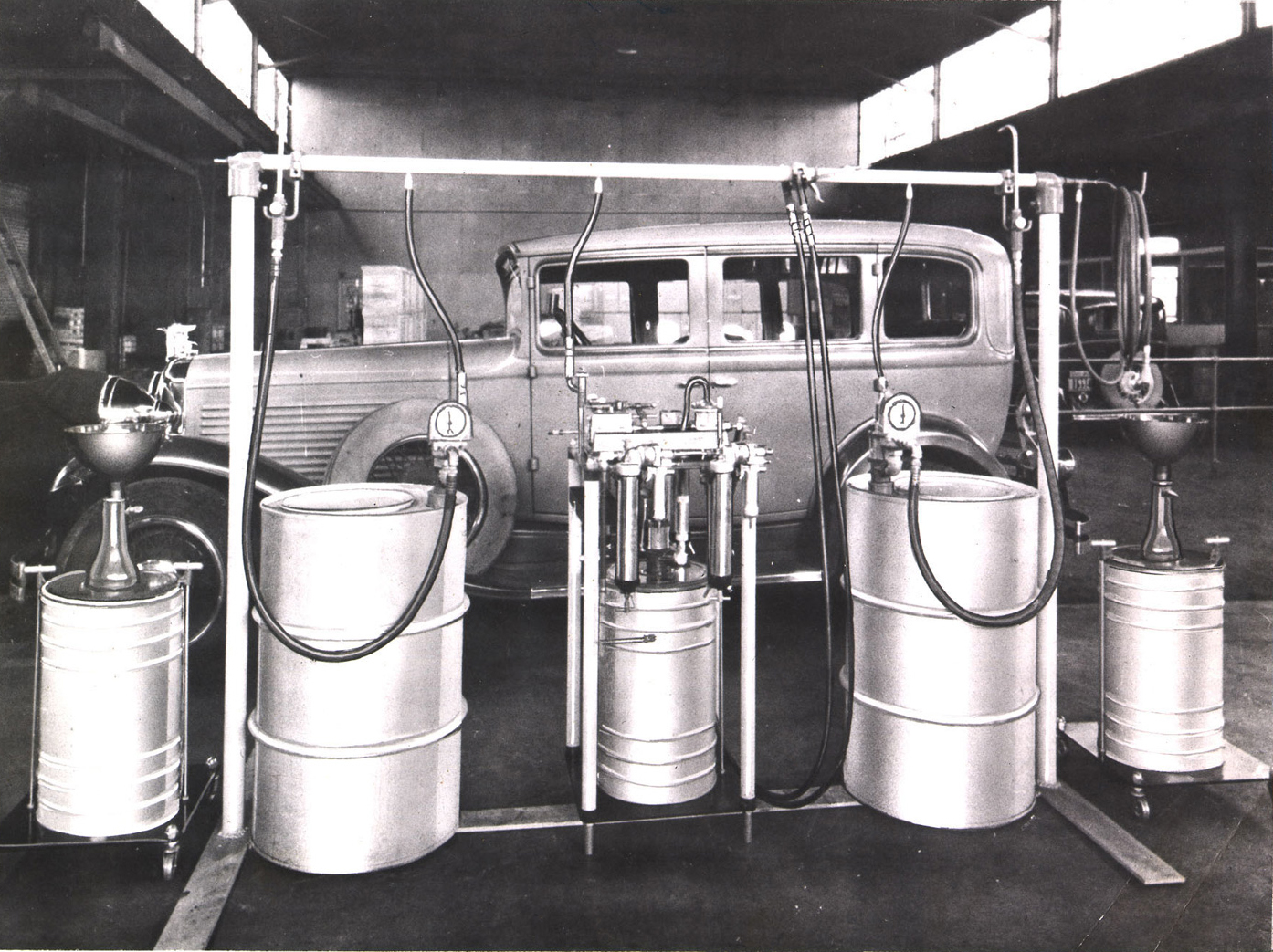
An early lubrication island at a service station in the 1930s.

In 1931, despite the Great Depression, Lincoln organized their own national sales force. Lubrication had become their primary focus, marketing a wide range of products to car dealers and service stations through a network of distributors called jobbers. From 1931 to 1933, Barks patented many lubrication devices including fittings and couplers.

In 1934, Stewart-Warner Corp., sued Lincoln (then named Lincoln Engineering Co.) for patent infringement, arguing that Lincoln's new fittings violated their patents. The case was heard before courts in St. Louis, Fargo, Chicago and Pittsburgh before eventually being settled by the United States Supreme Court in 1938.

The court ruled in favor of Lincoln. In his writing of the Opinion of the Court, Justice (Owen J.) Roberts said:

" We conclude that Butler's (Stewart-Warner) effort, by the use of a combination claim, to extend the monopoly of his invention of an improved form of chuck or coupler to old parts or elements having no new function when operated in connection with the coupler renders the claim hooker. Decree reversed."

The Court's decision in 1938 paved the way for Lincoln to market a line of fittings, grease guns and accessories under a product line the company named Kleenseal. Various hand-held grease guns, couplers and other accessories were developed to address a wide range of applications.

Despite the pressures of a long-term suit, the company developed the first drum pump for transferring lubricants from the original refinery containers. Lincoln developed the first portable oil drain and a quick detachable air coupler. These innovations led to complete lubrication pumps and swivel assemblies that dispensed lubricant directly from the original refinery container to an automobile on an overhead lift. Service stations, car dealers and mechanics began to heavily promote their lubrication services and Lincoln developed white drum sleeves to cover the refinery containers. (Fox)

In 1936, Lincoln introduced Lincoln's Island Battery, with three white-sleeved pump drums, white pump motors and a white platform. Eventually, the company developed complete lubrication cabinets and "merchandisers" to assist car dealerships and service stations in marketing their lubrication services. Floor mounted reels were adapted to facilitate the dispensing of crankcase oil and were eventually incorporated into lubrication cabinets.

In March 1941, Alex P. Fox succeeded Frank Barks as president of Lincoln Engineering. Barks died aboard a cruise ship returning from South America. Fox would remain president until 1957.

=== The War years ===
Lincoln's expertise in lubrication was called into service when World War II broke out. The company began producing grease guns and fittings for the Quartermaster Corps and tooling for the production of small caliber ammunition.

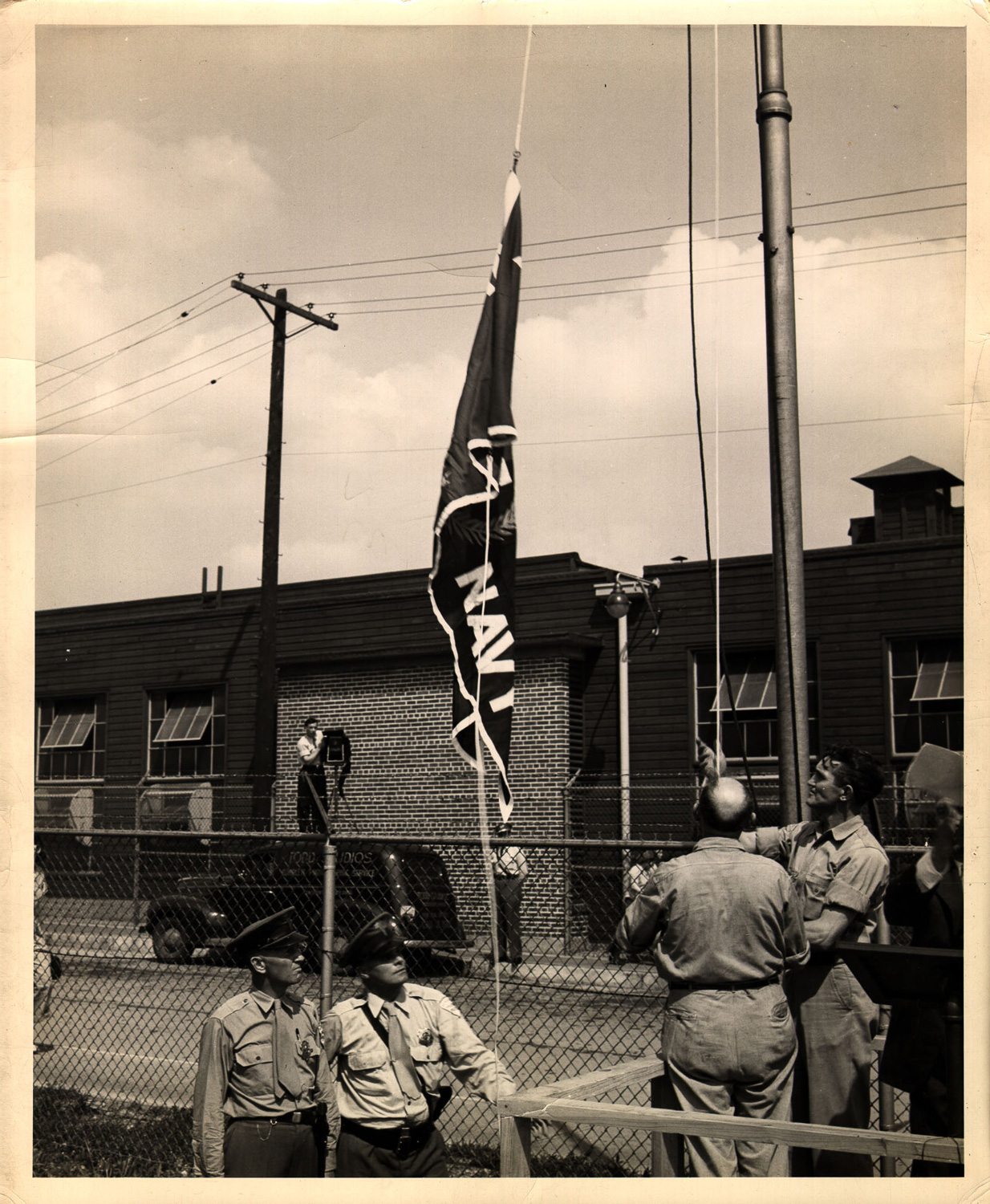
Military personnel raise the E Award flag at the Lincoln headquarters.

In addition, the company manufactured 20 mm high-explosive projectiles used in fighter planes (Lincoln Production War Bulletin) and boosters for 155 and 105 artillery pieces. The boosters were the ignition source used to fire the big guns. (Redenbaugh)

The military also wanted a "surface check" grease fitting that would help to prevent dirt from entering through a fitting. Lincoln had developed many advances in fittings including the Bullneck fitting and a surface check feature – the design that remains the most widely used in industry today. The company's relationship with the armed forces was helped by an ex-employee who became a procurement officer serving in the Pentagon. (Redenbaugh)

Lincoln received the Army-Navy ‘E’ Award five times during the war. They built special gasoline-powered grease guns that could be used in the field and a steel suitcase including manual lever guns and the gasoline-drive grease guns used on tanks and other motorized vehicles on the front.

The government issued a blanket deferment for all workers – around 1,000 people – because of Lincoln's war plant status. More women worked in the plant during the war than had ever been employed previously. (Schneller)

The company operated a separate facility about a mile east of the main plant. The "Geraldine" facility manufactured the boosters as part of the U.S. Army St. Louis Ordnance Plant. (Redenbaugh)

== Production ==
=== Automatic Lubrication ===
In 1937, Lincoln introduced the first single-line, positive-displacement lubrication system for industry. The system was significantly less expensive than conventional two-line systems. Designed by Lincoln's chief of Engineering, Lutwin Rotter, the Centro-Matic system used a pump to distribute lubricant to a number of injectors. These injectors measure the amount of lubricant dispensed with each cycle of the pump. Initially, the pumps were hand operated. Later, air-operated pumps and mechanical timers called "Chicken House Timers" (Conley) were added to automate the entire system.

By dispensing very small amounts of lubricant every few hours, the correct amount of lubricant remained in the bearing. This made industrial bearings last longer. Automated lubrication reduced maintenance costs for many types of manufacturing operations and became very important in the mining sector. The first application, at a coal mine in Indiana, was on a Marian shovel. Eventually, manufacturers of large mining equipment made these systems standard equipment on every large haul truck, shovel, drag line and mill they sold. (Godier)

Centro-Matic became Lincoln's primary product for the industrial market. In time, more features allowed Centro-Matic systems to service hundreds of lubrication points with pumps dispensing lubricant directly from refinery containers.

=== The Lincoln 815 Air Coupler ===
Also called Flex-O-Matic, Long Nose, Lincoln Series, and Type L or Style L Air-Line Fittings

The 815 air coupler replaced the existing, difficult-to-operate, push-twist-lock style coupler. The design simply pushed on and pulled off using an easy sleeve device that was pulled back when attaching or detaching an air hose.

The Lincoln 815 Air Coupler, introduced April 7, 1942, is the standard 3/8-inch (9.5 mm) air hose coupler used today in almost every industry. Before the inventor retired, Lincoln had sold more than 50,000,000 units. Rudy Schneller said of his invention, "They haven't made a single change since the original. Can you imagine? We'd all be riding Model Ts."

Lincoln Flex-O-Matic automatic air coupling was once used as an improved solution to a girl's prosthetic leg so she could easily change from shoes to sneakers.

=== Lincoln's Series 20 and PowerMaster Pumps ===
Lincoln pioneered many innovations in lubrication pump design. In 1940, a 2 1/2 in (64 mm) air motor was invented that utilized a full stroke valve mechanism (Victor Klein, principal inventor) that permitted a pump without springs by operating using only compressed air.

In 1946, Rotter improved the reciprocating engine of the 2 1/2 in (64 mm) air motor by reducing the number of parts and increasing the efficiency of the motor. The current Series 20 lubricant pumps, still popular with automotive markets and industrial customers, has changed little since these innovations.

Schneller later worked on a design that divorced the air motor from the pump tube. The PowerMaster concept had several advantages. By selecting from various air motor and pump combinations, you could control the pump ratio (air input to pump output) more precisely with more options.

When lubricant pumps were first invented, they were used to pump oil and lightweight greases. Overtime, lubricant viscosity increased and lubricant pumps were stressed to the limits. The higher viscosity lubricants were required because cars were built to perform at higher RPM (Conley). One outcome of attempting to pump heavier materials was that seals would fail and the lubricant would leak into the air motor. By divorcing the pump tube from the air motor, a seal failure would simply cause grease to be leaked onto the ground, not into the air motor. Also, the new design allowed for easier repairs of the pump or the packings which were being "eaten away" by new materials and chemistry affecting the industry. (Schneller)

This divorced air motor pump design eventually lead to the invention of the PileDriver pump series. The same air motors used with larger capacity pump tubes enabled these new pumps to output extremely heavy materials such as mastics, adhesives and sealant. Today, PileDriver pumps are used to pump materials used in the construction of everything from appliances to automobiles. In addition, large printing presses called web presses use Lincoln PileDriver pumps to distribute very heavy ink to the press. Web presses are used by newspapers, magazine publishers and high-volume commercial printers.

=== Standardizing on The 55-U.S. Gallon Drum ===
The development of pumps that could pump material out of refinery lubricant containers was both a positive to industry and a problem for equipment producers and customers.

In a letter to the National Lubrication Grease Institute (N.L.G.I.) written by Rotter called "A Plea for Uniformity in the Packaging of Lubricating Greases" he identifies the problems associated with the variations of pail and drum sizes and suggests a standard approach.

In the paper Rotter details the problems related to variations in drum height and width and the effect on pump tube length as well as drum cover, follower plate and pressure primer design. He details the benefits to lubricant manufacturers and customers in inventory handling and cost savings. And he calls for a joint effort by N.L.G.I., petroleum industry groups, the American Standards Association and the National Bureau of Standards to solve the problem of inconsistent lubricant packaging.

The effort paid off, leading to the development of the 55-gallon drum, a standard which remains in effect today.

=== The Fisher Lincoln Automatic Turntable ===
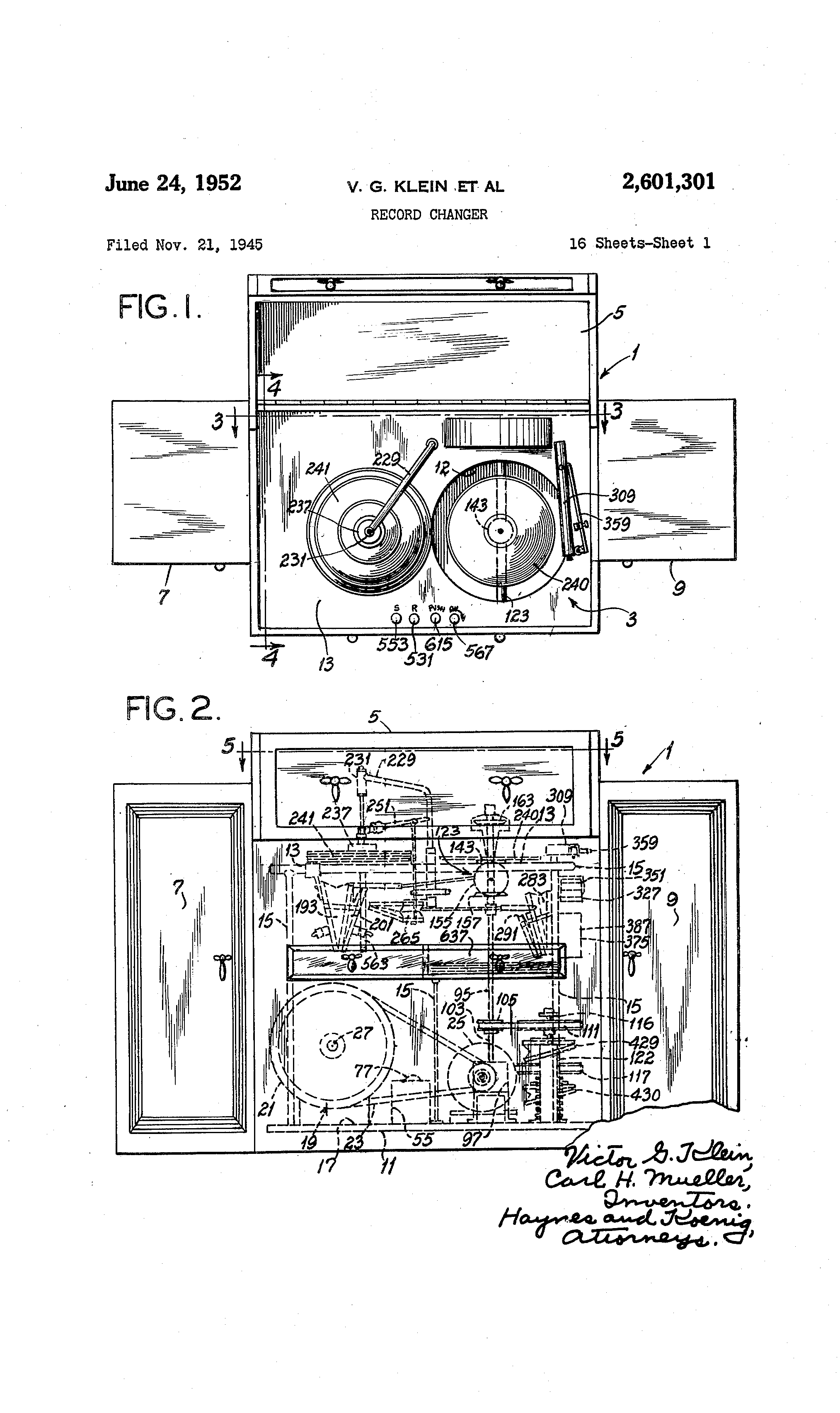
In a rare deviation from inventing lubrication equipment, Lincoln engineers designed a vacuum-operated record changer.

By 1950, innovations in automobile design reduced the number of grease fittings on cars from an average of 24 to just 12 fittings. This represented a significant impact on sales by Lincoln of lubrication fittings and on equipment used to lubricate cars. The company was open to the possibility of using its engineering capability to develop new products unrelated to lubrication.

On June 24, 1952, Lincoln patented a vacuum-operated record changer capable of changing records of various dimensions including 78s, 33 1/3 rpm, 16 speed and 45s. Because the unit was vacuum driven, it would stall if the record became hung up, without damage to the record. Old changers that were mechanically driven would jam under these conditions and crush records.

The first version of the unit (Model 50) was, called the Linco-Matic, was sold by Liberty Music in New York. Lincoln sold 3,500 units, including five to Bing Crosby. The patent lists Victor Klein as the inventor, but Rudy Schneller was instrumental in the unit's design, receiving a $3,500 bonus (six months salary) for his efforts. The unit sold for $300 (Cerwinski)

The Model 65 played only 33 1/3 rpm and was marketed as a Lincoln Fisher Record Changer. The company tried selling them through Steinway dealers, but had more success working with specialty installers. Austin King was a local dealer. Lincoln stopped selling record changers in 1965. (Redenbaugh)

In the unit's technical service manual the principles of operation are described as follows: "The movements of the change mechanism of the Lincoln are operated entirely by controlled vacuum. The vacuum is produced during the change cycle by a vacuum pump, and distributed throughout the vacuum system by means of seven cam operated valves and one check valve."

The cost and complexity of the unit eventually led to the Fisher Lincoln Record Changer's demise. According to Schneller, "I think the cost of the machine doomed it. We (also) had a problem with quality. We couldn't consistently build them".

=== Multi-Luber ===
First used for automobiles, and later agricultural equipment, the Multi-Luber was an onboard lubrication device that supplied grease to critical bearings during operation. Eventually, the unit was sold to truck manufacturers and by the early 1960s it was offered by most manufacturers of agricultural machinery and commercial trucks. It is still used by agricultural machinery makers on some of their units.

Ford announced the multi-luber as a factory option on its 1955 Lincoln and Mercury car models. (Ford's president, Benson Ford, was given demo at his home) Promoted as "Dashboard Lubrication", the car's owner simply pushed a button once a day or every 50 miles (80 km) of highway driving to lubricate every bearing except the universal joint. Multi¬lubers also became available as kits for installation on other Ford and Chevrolet models.

=== The Lever Grease Gun ===
Lincoln patented the first lever grease gun to work with a full stroke operation called the Model 1242. This meant that a hand-held grease gun could generate up to 10,000 lbf/in² (70 MPa) of pressure. Operators of the unit could push grease into blocked or "frozen" fittings and the unit allowed for work in confined areas.

The first lever grease gun, the Model 1042, was introduced during the war. It was so popular, it led to the standardization of grease tubes (400 g or 14 oz) to fit the device.

== A Focus On Lubrication Equipment ==
Over the years, Lincoln developed and sold many types of non-lubrication equipment for automotive professionals including wheel-balancing equipment, timing devices, spark plug testers, battery testers, car lifts, compressors and fuel injection systems. Those products are no longer offered.

By the early 1950s, the company's product offering had matured. The focus for many years after that was to improve upon the inventions of the past.

Lincoln was acquired in 1953 and has since been bought and sold several times. Even with more recent acquisitions by parent companies, lubrication remains the primary product offering under the Lincoln brand.

== SKF and Lincoln Industrial ==
In October 2010, Lincoln Industrial was acquired by Svenska Kullagerfabriken AB, more commonly known as SKF. SKF, a bearing company based in Gothenburg, Sweden and founded in 1907, supplies bearings, seals, lubricants, maintenance products, mechatronics products, power transmission products and related services globally.

== Bibliography ==
- U.S. Army Corps of Engineers; "Case Study for Interior Flood Damage Reduction Measures, Valley Park Missouri". U.S. Army Corps of Engineers Publication Number ETL 1110-2-367. March 31, 1995
- Cerwinski, Mike. Personal interview. November 12, 2001
- Fox, Alex P., A Brief History of the Lincoln Engineering Company, St. Louis. 1949
- Godier, Gary, The History of Lincoln, St. Louis. 2001
- Grove, Jim. Telephone interview, November 12, 2001
- Inventions Near the End of the 19th century, University of New Mexico
- Lotspeich, Roy. Personal interview, 14. November 2001
- Redenbaugh, Robert. Telephone interview. November 13, 2001
- Schneller, Rudy. Personal interview conducted by Susan McDonald and Paul Conley. June 3, 2001
