= Enteroscopy =

Medical imaging of the small bowel

- Purpose: direct visualization of the small bowel.

Enteroscopy is the procedure of using an endoscope for the direct visualization of the small bowel. Etymologically, the word could potentially refer to any bowel endoscopy (entero- + -scopy), but idiomatically it is conventionally restricted to small bowel endoscopy, in distinction from colonoscopy, which is large bowel endoscopy. Various types of enteroscopy exist, as follows:

- Video chip enteroscopy
  - Double-balloon enteroscopy
  - Single-balloon enteroscopy
  - Spiral enteroscopy
- Wireless endoscopy
  - Capsule endoscopy

As the small bowel can often be a source of pathology, endoscopy of the small bowel can be a useful diagnostic and therapeutic technique. Esophagogastroduodenoscopy, also called upper endoscopy, gets as far as the first segment of the small bowel, the duodenum, but the next two, the jejunum and ileum, require other methods. Visualization of the small bowel has long posed a challenge to gastroenterologists, due to the physical difficulty of reaching more distal regions of the small bowel. With the advent of the newer forms of enteroscopy, such as the double-balloon type, visualizing the entire tract is finally a practical reality in at least some cases, although it is still technically demanding.

Traditional gastroscopes can generally visualize the proximal and distal duodenum in the hands of experienced endoscopists but are limited due to the length of the instrument. Pediatric colonoscopes or sometimes dedicated enteroscopes which are much longer than standard gastroscopes can visualize the proximal jejunum. This technique is referred to as push enteroscopy. Due to the length of the small bowel, averaging 4–6 meters in the adult, push enteroscopy is still not effective to adequately visualize large portions of the small intestine.

Wireless capsule endoscopy has proven to be the endoscopic investigation of choice for visualization of the entire small bowel. An 11 x 26 mm pill sized video camera is swallowed by the patient and approximately 8 hours of video is transmitted wirelessly to a receiver worn by the patient. The procedure is painless, well accepted by patients and offers a very high accuracy. It is limited by the inability to obtain biopsies, and is therefore considered a purely diagnostic tool.

Newer techniques, including single and double-balloon endoscopy have been developed to overcome some of these issues, but are limited by the length of the procedure, and the need for deep sedation or general anesthesia. Spiral enteroscopy is a novel technique that utilizes an overtube with raised spirals affixed on the enteroscope that is rotated to advance the enteroscope deep into the small bowel. Each of these 3 enteroscopy platforms offers similar accuracy and effectiveness but do not have widespread availability.
