= Air-line fitting =

Operation and styles of various international fittings

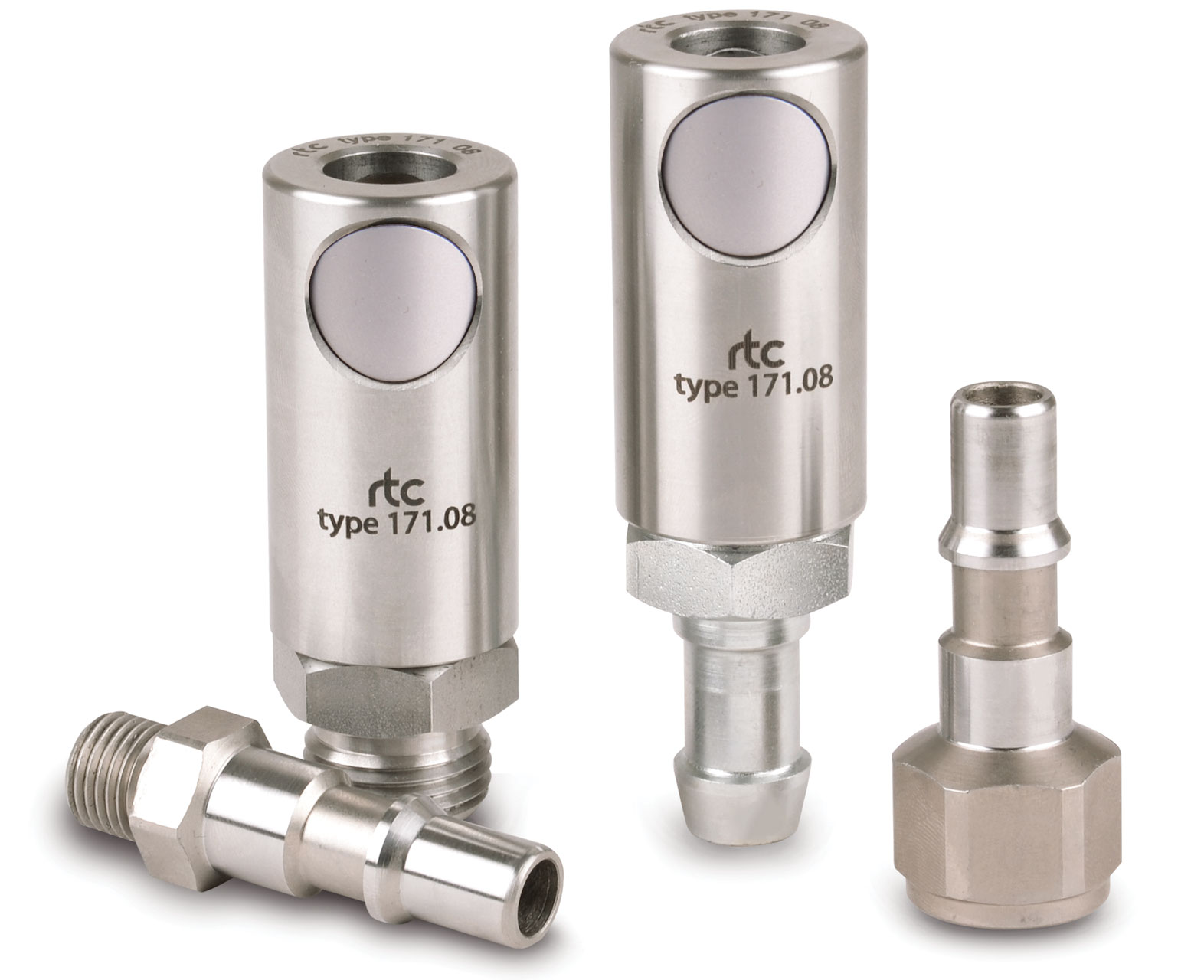
Nipples with mating safety couplings

Also known as pneumatic couplings, quick disconnects, air couplers, quick connect couplers, and quick couplers, hand-operable air-line fittings allow manual disconnection of gas supply lines, including compressed air and breathable air (a subset of breathing gases). Most fittings do not have regional standardization but have become de facto standards through popular adoption.

== Mechanical structure ==
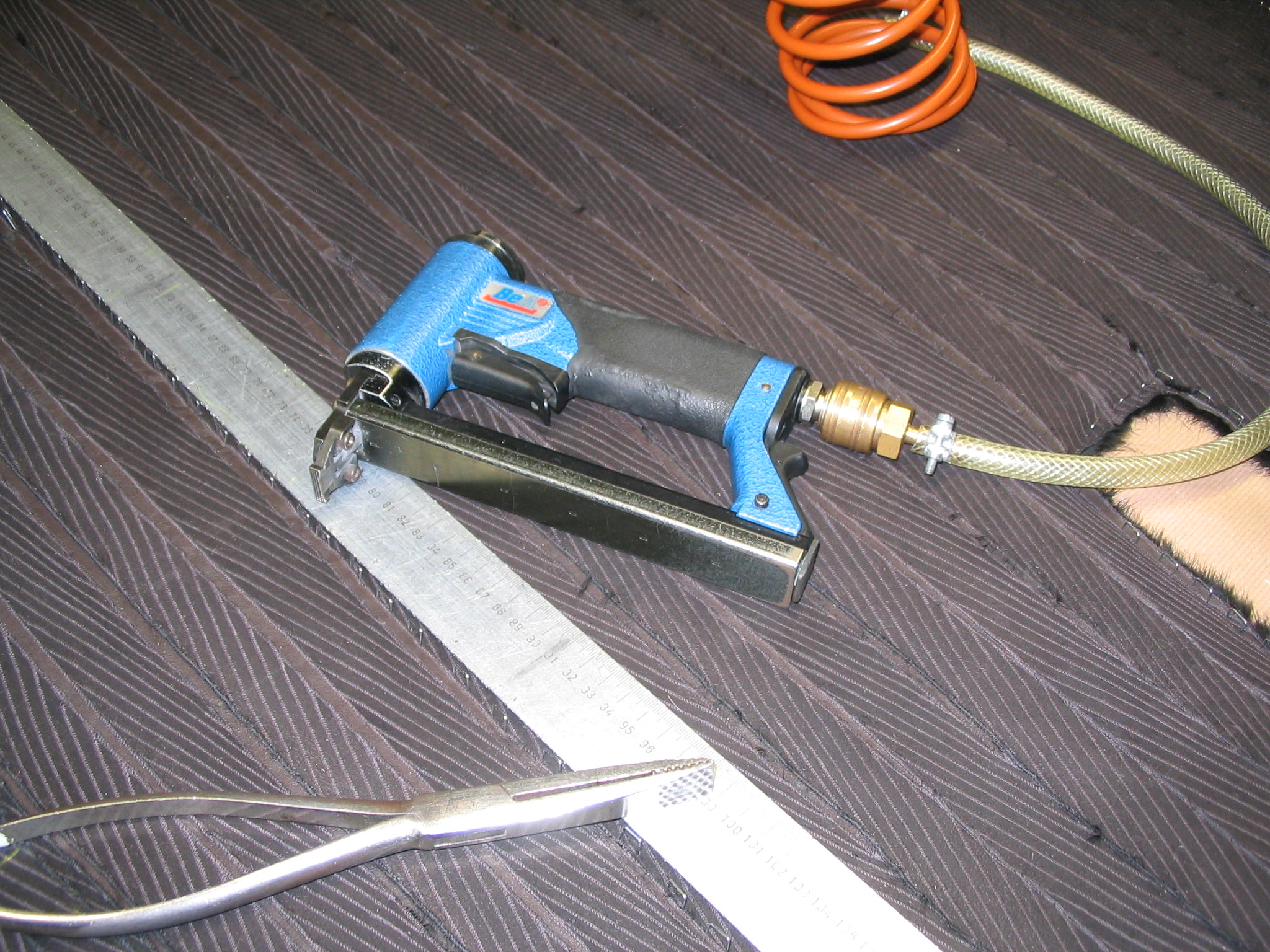
Pneumatic tool attached using a coupling

A coupled pair consists of a male nipple or plug and a female coupler or socket. One side is connected to a flexible supply hose; the other may be attached to a manifold, valve, tool, or another hose. A female coupler is used on the supply side, and a male nipple is used on the receiving side.

Fitting profiles have identifiable geometry on the male end, but care must be taken to use a compatible coupler. Couplers use springs and balls to lock mating nipples into place. A seal is effected using O-rings along the shaft of the nipple or by compression by the tip. Although incompatible pairs may latch, the sealing performance may be compromised.

=== Features ===
- Push-to-connect or automatic couplings automatically lock when assembled.
- ISO 4414 "safety" couplings use two-stage unlocking to vent air prior to disconnection, thereby preventing hose whip.

== Breathable air applications ==
For breathable air applications such as SCBA, these may found on both sides of the first-stage and second-stage pressure regulators (very similar to SCUBA diving regulators) to allow for rapid and tool-free return-to-service. For breathable air applications such as supplied-air and mixed supplied-air with SCBA backup, the quick-disconnect fittings allow movement of a worker from one supplied-air station to another.

== Other applications ==
These fittings or special-service variants may also be found in hydraulic applications and alternative compressed gas applications (Oxy-acetylene welding and cutting, fuel gases, NSF C-2 food-contact, etc.).

== Common fitting profiles by size ==
European convention uses DN (nominal diameter) to denote a nominal size of each fitting. Various manufacturers specify series or styles for each profile. Fittings are commonly referred to by their manufacturer name/series, i.e., "Rectus 25" for the common European standard. Proprietary designs supported by a single manufacturer are not included in this table.

				Manufacturer Series						
Profile	Description	DN	Standards	RTC	CEJN	Rectus	Parker	Milton	PCL	Walther
	German/Walther 2.5	2.5		200.03	141	50				LP-002
	German/Walther 2.7	2.7		020		20/91				06-003
	US Industrial 1/8" HP	3	ISO 6150C	170.03		303				
	German/Camozzi/EWO/Kani	5		021	223	21/90				
	Schrader 1/4"	5		017.06		17	TL		PF	
	US Industrial 1/4"	5.3/5.5	A-A-59439, ANSI T3.20.14-1990, MIL-C-4109F, ISO 6150B	023	310	23/24	20/30	M	ISO B12	
	US Industrial 1/4" HP	5.5	ISO 6150C	170.06	291	18				
	Tru-Flate/Automotive 1/4"						10	T		
	ARO 210	5.5		014/022	300	14/22	50	A	A Style	
	Lincoln					70	L			
	UK/English Industrial/PCL	5.5		019		19			Standard	
	German/Walther 6 LP	6		200.05		52				LP-006
	German/Walther 6 SP	6		200.06		51				SP-006
	Scandinavian 6.5/7.4	6.5/7.4		032.06	303	31/1300				
	Hi-Flow/Eurostandard 7.2	7.2/7.4		025/026	320	25/26		V	XF-Euro	
	Asian/Japanese/Nitto	7.5		013	315	13			KF	
	Tru-Flate/Automotive 3/8"						10	P		
	US Industrial 3/8"	8.2/8.5	A-A-59439, ISO 6150B	030	430	30	20/30	H		
	US Industrial 3/8" HP	8	ISO 6150C	170.08	381	84				
	ARO 310	9		014.09		40		AA		
	Scandinavian 9.5/10	9.5/10		032.10	408	32/1800				
	Eurostandard 10	10		027	410	27				
	Schrader 1/2"			017.10			TL			
	US Industrial 1/2"	11	A-A-59439, ISO 6150B	037	550	37	20/30	G		
	US Industrial 1/2" HP	11	ISO 6150C	170.11	471					
	Tru-Flate/Automotive 1/2"						10	G		
	German/Walther 12	12		200.12		57				LP-012

== See also ==
- Quick connect fitting
