= Automatic lubrication system =

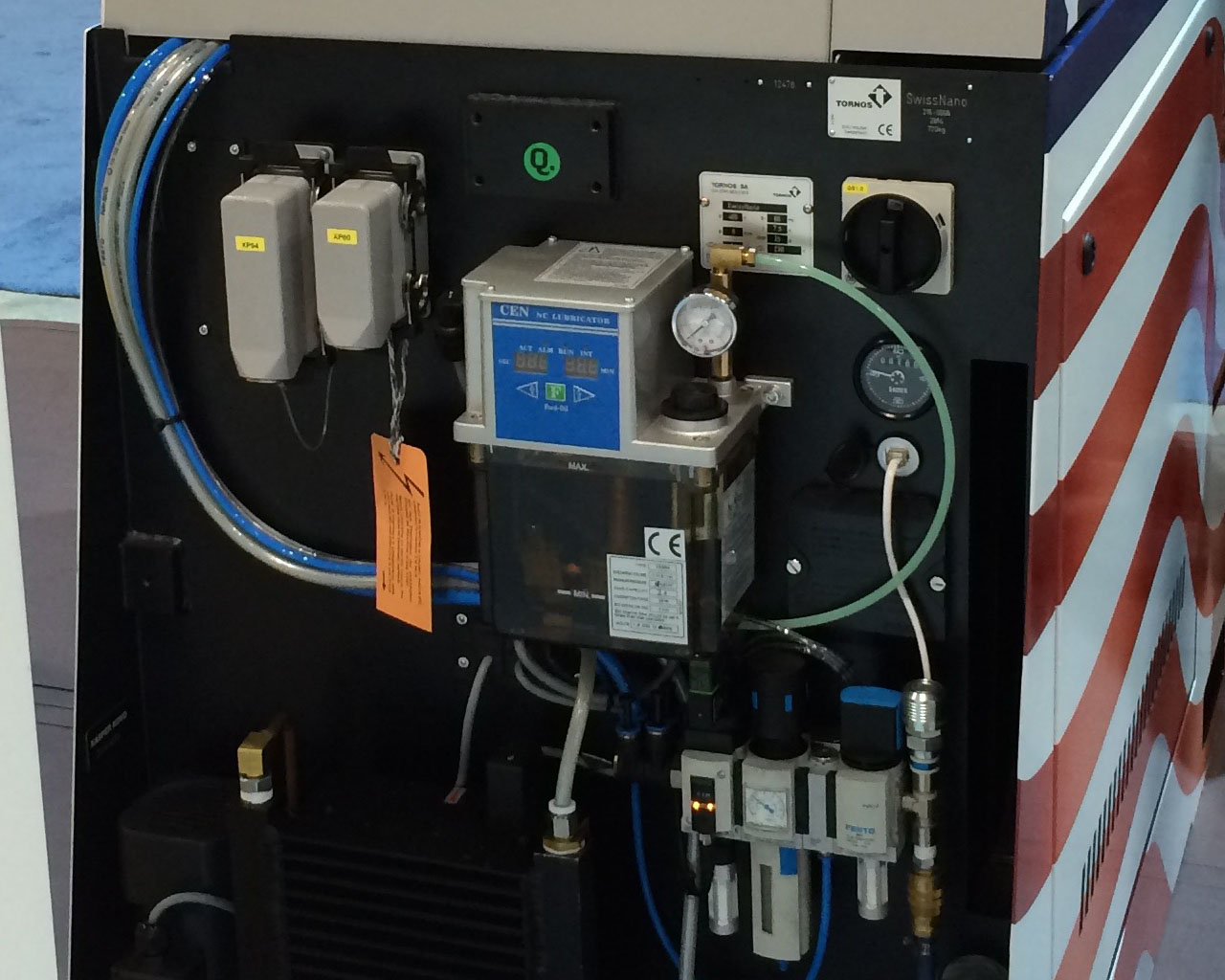
Automatic lubrication system installed on computer numerical control machine

Automatic lubrication systems (ALS), also known as centralized lubrication systems (CLS), are mechanical devices used in industrial machines and engines to apply specified quantities of a lubricant to distribution points while the machine is operating.

== Introduction ==
An automatic lubrication system consists of a reservoir with a pump, feed lines, metering valves, and injectors. The automatic lubrication system is connected to a control system via switches. The control system may involve human input or may be computerised (computer numerical control or CNC).

There are advantages of using an automatic lubrication system over a manual system.

For example, there are savings in the costs of human resources. The dangers of accessing difficult to reach lubrication points while a machine is running are avoided. Machines can be running when lubrication takes place, thus decreasing disruption to production. Manual lubrication may result in over- or under-lubrication whereas an automatic lubrication system ensures a measured and consistent amount of lubricant is applied. (Over-lubrication can result in over-heating, spoiled product, damage to bearing seals and a need for extra cleaning. Under-lubrication can result in higher running costs and decreased machine longevity.) Effective lubrication reduces wear and therefore extends component life. Breakdowns are less frequent. Adequate lubrication decreases friction and therefore energy consumption.

== Systems ==
Automatic lubrication systems can be categorised according to the type of lubricant, the method of controlling the volume of lubricant and or the method of distributing the lubricant.

Oil systems are used in stationary machinery such as a CNC mill, for example. Grease systems are used in mobile machines such as trucks, mining and construction equipment. The appropriate lubricant for an automatic lubrication system can be determined using a Lincoln ventmeter. Factors such as the lubricant consistency, the diameter and length of the feed line and the operating temperature are taken into account. The lubricant, be it oil or grease, is dispensed from a reservoir. The systems can be monitored remotely and managed by control systems. The scientific study of factors such as these is called tribology.

Pressure-relief systems, also called piston lubrication systems or positive displacement injector (PDI) systems, use a piston to apply an accurate lubricant volume to the lubrication point. A pressure relief system is used when the volume of lubricant applied must be precise.

Resistant oil lubricators use the resistance of an outlet to control a continuous flow of lubricant. Further control is given by proportion adapters or oil meter adapters. Resistant oil lubricators are used when a precise volume of lubricant is less essential.

=== Feed line systems ===
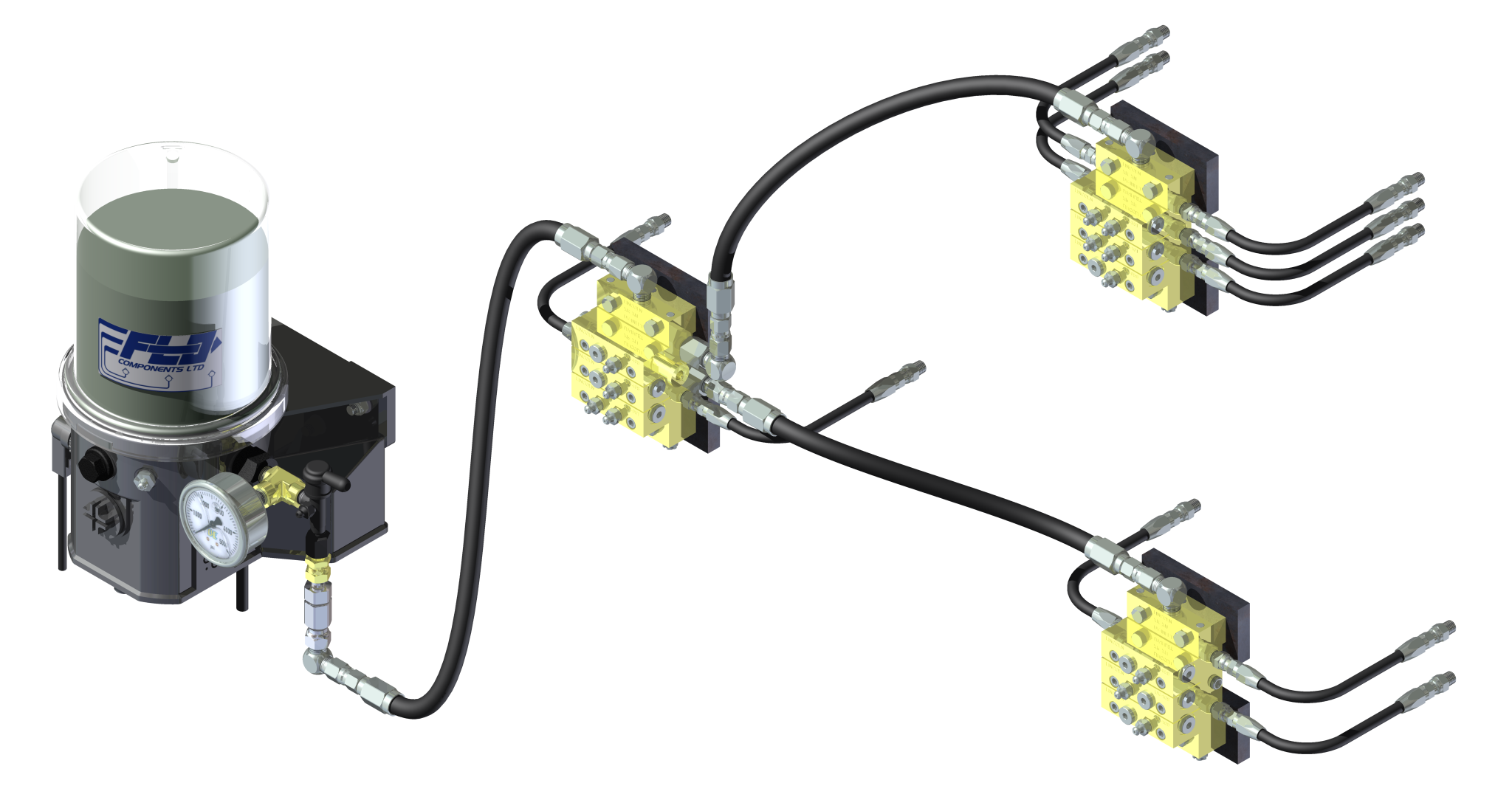
Single-line progressive automatic lubrication system

There are a variety of feed line systems used in automatic lubricating systems. These include single-line progressive systems, single line parallel systems, dual-line parallel systems, mist lubrication and multiport direct lubricators.

==== Single-line progressive system ====
A single-line progressive system uses the flow of the lubricant itself to cause individual metering valves and valve assemblies to cycle. The cycling of the valve causes the pistons to move back and forth in a cylinder of a specific diameter (bore). When a piston moves forward, it displaces lubricant which, in turn, causes the next piston to move forwards. The valve output is a fixed volume however, the amount of time taken for each piston to move back and forth can be varied and pre-programmed. Lubrications points are arranged in series.

==== Single-line parallel system ====
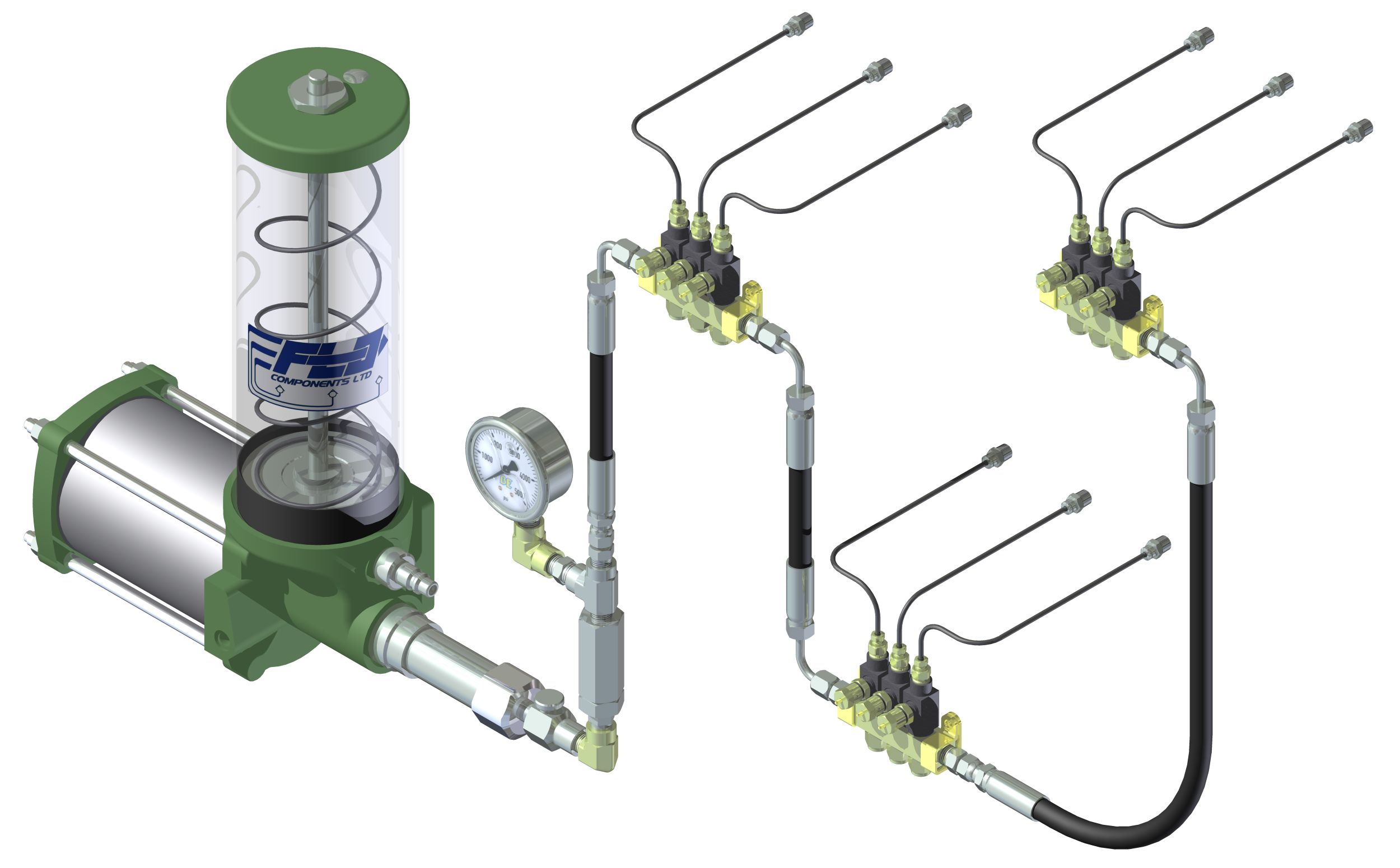
Single-line parallel automatic lubrication system

The first single-line parallel system for industrial machines was introduced in 1937 by Lincoln Engineering (now known as Lincoln Industrial) in the United States.

A single-line parallel system can apply lubricant in a single machine, different zones of lubricant points on a single machine, or even a number of separate machines using hydraulic pressure. It is most useful when the required volume of lubricant varies from one lubricant point to another. In this type of system, a central pump station automatically delivers lubricant through a single supply line to multiple branches of injectors. Each injector serves a single lubrication point, operates independently, and may be individually adjusted to deliver the desired amount of lubricant.

When the system is started, a pump increases the pressure of lubricant throughout the system to a set point. A pressure switch signals the control system that lubricant has been applied at all the lubricant distribution points have been reached. The pump stops, pressure is vented from the system and the lubricant is directed back to the pump reservoir.

==== Dual-line parallel system ====
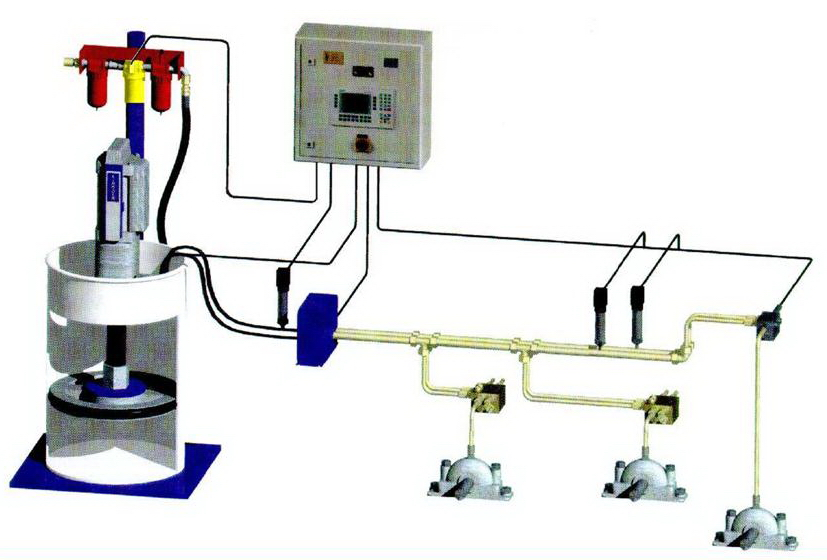
Dual-line parallel automatic lubrication system

A dual-line parallel system also uses hydraulic pressure to apply lubricant in measured amounts. In an alternating pattern, one line is building hydraulic pressure while the other is venting pressure. The dual-line parallel system can apply lubricant to hundreds of lubricant distribution points located over several thousands of feet while using a single pump and relatively small diameter feed lines.

==== Multi-point direct lubricator system ====
A multi-point direct lubricator system uses a control system, to engage a drive motor, to turn a set of cams, which activate injectors at the lubricant distribution points. This type of system is easy to designs and troubleshoot. It can achieve automatic lubrication without accessories.

== See also ==
- Tribology
