= Parflange F37 =

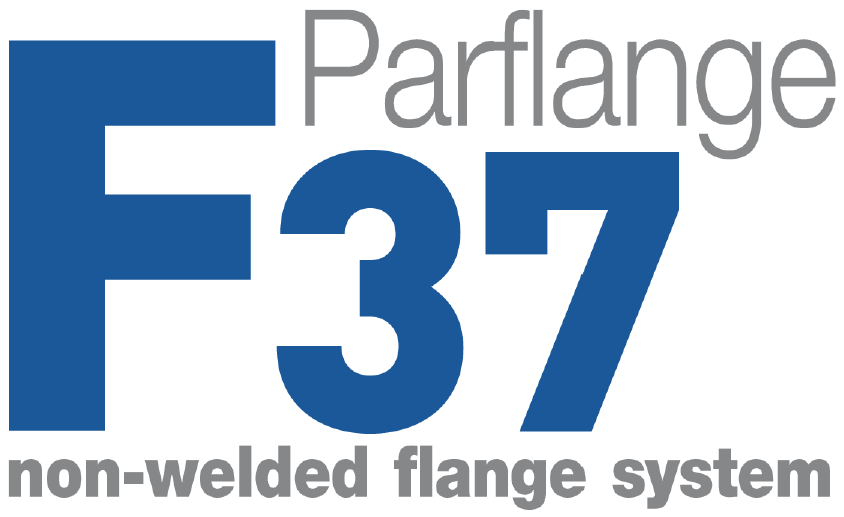
Parflange F37 Logo

The Parflange F37 system is a technology from the hydraulic area of Parker-Hannifin, which allows a non welded flange connection of hydraulic tubes and pipes.

== Processing ==
Use-orientated, the connection will be done by either flaring or retaining ring technology.

Flaring Technology After putting a F37 flange onto a seamless hydraulic tube or pipe, the tube end will be flared to 37°, what also explains the name of this technology. The flaring is done by a special orbitally flaring process, which compresses the surface of the pipe end, gaining an excellent sealing surface.

An insert made of carbon or stainless steel will be placed into the flared pipe end. The insert is soft sealed by an O-Ring to the pipe side. To be sealed against a flat counterpart (e.g. manifold or block) the insert has a groove on the front side for a so-called "F37-Seal" made of Polyurethane or optionally an o-ring or bonded seal made of carbon steel or stainless steel with a Nitrile rubber or FKM sealing lip. Alternatively, the front side of the insert can be flat. For a pipe to pipe connection, a special insert design with soft sealed cones on both sides to fit between two flared pipe ends is available.

Afterwards, the flange will be positioned to the pipe end and connected to a hydraulic component or another pipe having a similar flange and corresponding insert.

Retaining Ring Technology

For the Retaining Ring connection, a groove will be machined onto the pipe end to hold the retaining ring. The retaining ring is made of a segmented stainless steel ring covered by a steainless steel spring and is used to fix the flange. For the assembly, the retaining ring flange has to be put onto the machined pipe end. The retaining ring has to be widened for getting it on the pipe end to snap into the before machined groove. The inside contour of the retaining ring flange will cover the retaining ring from the outside.

The sealing of the Parflange F37 retaining ring connection is done by a bonded seal on the face side of the pipe end or alternatively by a pipe seal carrier ("PSC"). The pipe seal carrier has soft seales (o-rings or F37-Seals) on both sides. On one side, the pipe seal carrier has a centering aid to improve assembly.

== Functionality ==
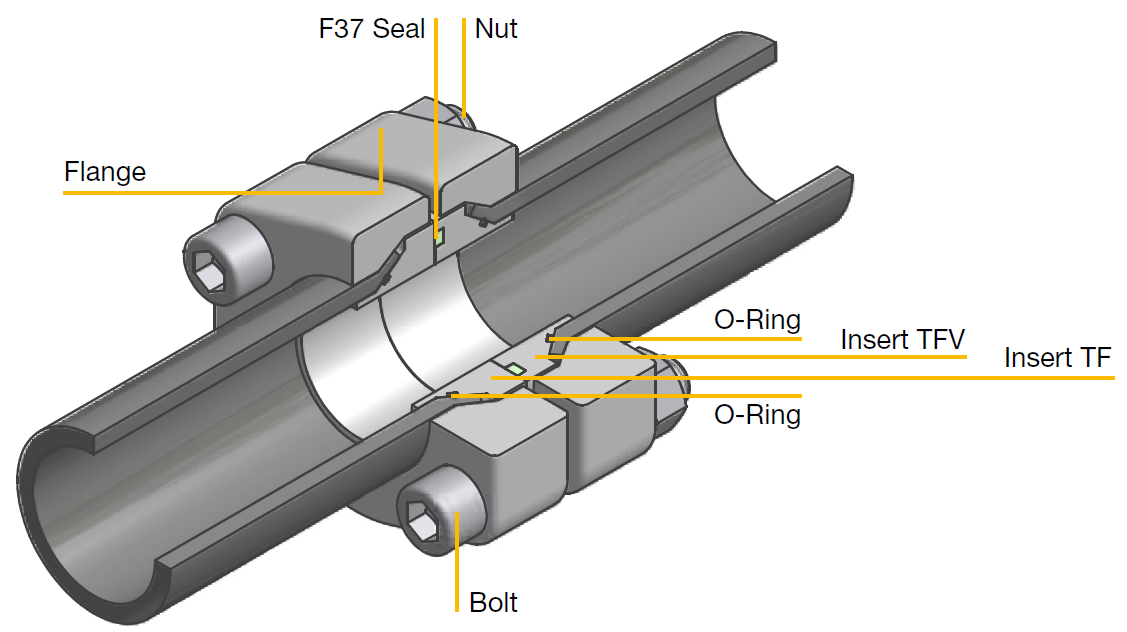
Illustration of a Parflange F37 Flare Flange Connection

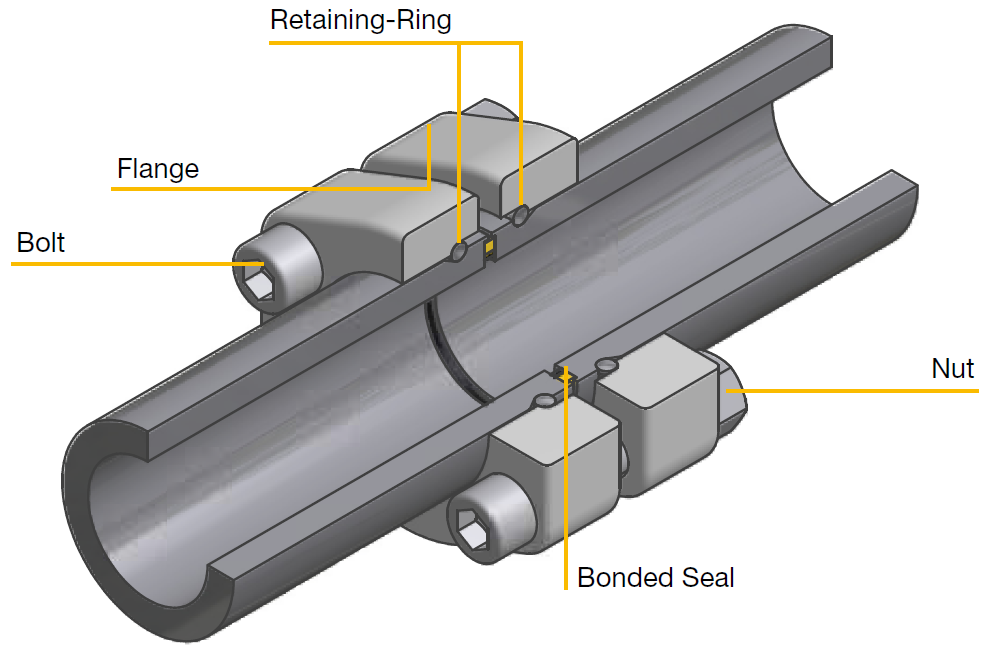
Illustration of a Parflange F37 Retaining Ring Connection

Flaring Technology

By flaring the pipe end, the flange gets a supporting surface and is able to build up force to ensure a stable connection.

At first, the insert has a sealing function. With its o-ring on the pipe end side, the sealing against the pipe is achieved. The sealing against the connecting part is done by the F37-Seal or a bonded seal. If the connecting part has a soft seal on the face side, an insert with a flat face has to be used. For the connection of two pipes, an insert with cones on both sides, which are soft sealed by o-rings, can be used as well.

Simultaneously, the insert stabilises the connection. The achieved pressure by tightening the flange bolts can be spread on a bigger contact surface of the insert, increasing the solidity of the connection.

Retaining Ring Technology

The special inside contour of the retaining ring flange covers the retaining ring, which is installed onto the machined pipe end. A form-closed connection results from the tightening of the flange, which will be sealed by bonded seal or pipe seal carrier on the face side.

== Application ==
The Parflange F37 system is used to connect haydraulic tubes, pipes and components without welding.

Depending on pipe and flange size, the F37 system is approved for pressure ratings up to 420 bar (6000 psi, respectively 42 MPa). It is commonly used in shipbuilding, offshore and heavy machinery industry for moving and controlling of e.g. cranes and elevators.

Furthermore, the Parflange F37 technology allows to connect tubes and pipes from 16 to 273 millimeter outside diameter (1/2" to 10" flange size).

== Approvals ==
The F37 system is approved by leading classification societies.

The flange hole patterns are according to ISO 6162-1/SAE J 518 Code 61 (3000 psi/210 bar), ISO 6162-2/SAE J518 Code 62 (6000 psi/420 bar) and ISO 6164 (400 bar).

== Other information ==
Advantages of Parflange F37 compared to welded flange connections are mainly in savings on time and costs. No costly inspection of welds (f.e. by x-ray graphing) and post-weld acid cleaning is needed, making the connection also more environment-friendly and safer than welding.

Compared to welding, no welding stress corrosion is possible, resulting in maximum service time of the pipe connection and a reduction of service costs.
