= Push-to-pull compression fittings =

Type of compression fitting

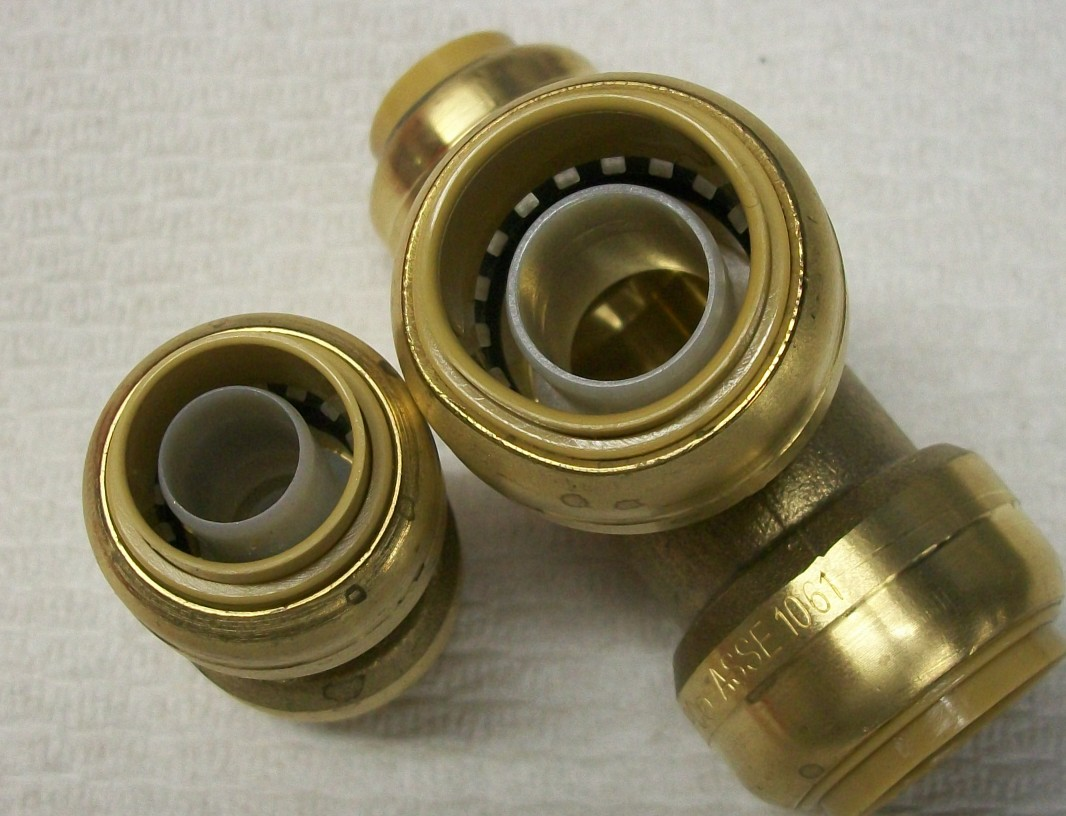
A push-in compression coupling and tee.

Push-to-pull, push-to-connect, push-in, push-fit, or instant fittings are a type of easily removed compression fitting or quick connect fitting that allows an air (or water) line to be attached, nominally without the use of tools (a tool is still usually required for cutting tubing to length and removal). These fittings act similar to the way regular compression fittings work, but use a resilient O-ring (normally EPDM) for sealing, and a grip ring (normally stainless steel) to hold the tube in place.

The main advantages of this technology over traditional soldered copper or glued plastic are that fittings can easily be unmounted and re-used, speed of assembly, assembly is possible when wet, and that the joints can still be rotated after connection.

These fittings can be used on all sorts of pipe of many sizes for many purposes.

== History ==
British manufacturer Hepworth Building Products (founded 1936 in Doncaster) introduced these fittings under the brand Hep2O in 1980. It was a grey plastic material for the first couple of decades. There was a reusable fitting that could be unscrewed and a slimmer single-use fitting which could not. A new grab washer was required each time if a joint was reused. The fittings were designed for use with polybutylene pipe, while stainless steel pipe inserts were used for internal support.

Hepworth was acquired by Wavin in 2005. Hep2O changed material and design in the 2000s to a smooth white plastic and a push-to-demount design. This resulted in a physically smaller fitting that is easier to release, especially in a confined space.

John Guest (Established in 1961, West Drayton, UK) developed the Speedfit push-fit connector for compressed air use in 1974, and introduced plumbing fittings in 1987. These fittings are white plastic, and are unscrewable to replace components, like Hep2O, but also have a push-release mechanism. Speedfit uses plastic pipe support inserts.

Brass demountable push-fit fittings are manufactured by Pegler under the brand Tectite. In the US, several different brands are available: Sharkbite, PlumBite, Nibco Push, which are all brass, demountable, similar to the Pegler Tectite design.

Some fittings are only designed for plastic (PEX and PERT) pipe and are non-removable. In the US, Legend Valve make a single-use push-fit system, and Sharkbite have one called EvoPex.

== Usage ==
Push fit connections are easier to make than soldered or glued connections, however there is still some knowledge needed to do it right. The defects that can cause joint failure are not pushing the pipe in far enough, not having a smooth round end to the pipe, too rough a pipe surface under the O-ring, and detritus in the mechanism.

Deburring the end of the pipe is vital to avoid damaging the O-ring on insertion, and the pipe surface under the ring must be smooth to get an adequate seal. The pipe end should be square so it sits against the stop in the fitting and does not cause turbulence in the flow of water.

It is quite easy to push the pipe in only as far as the grab ring, or the O-ring, and not all the way to the stop. This is the most common issue with inexperienced use of these connectors. Fitting designers have come up with a selection of methods to try and show the user when they have pushed it in far enough. Pipes are often marked to show the insertion depth, so if you cut at a mark, then insert the pipe up to the next mark, you will have a good connection. Hepworth pipe has always had this feature, for example. Making a mark before insertion is advised on pipe that is not pre-marked (e.g. copper pipe). Hepworth supply an insert with bulges on the end. When fully inserted this lines up with bulges in the fitting so that if you rotate the pipe in the fitting it "rumbles". Manufacturers of non-removable PEX/PERT fittings have included a coloured indicator ring which is pushed into a visible place on full insertion, or a spring-clip separator which is pushed out by the pipe so there is an audible "snap".
