= Double-balloon enteroscopy =

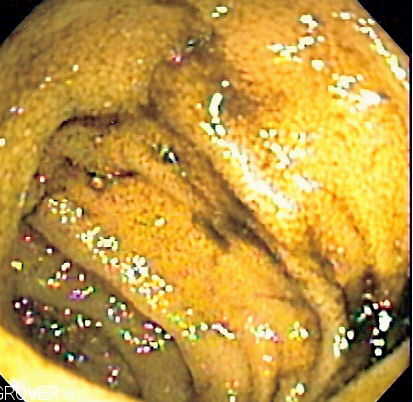
- Endoscopic image of normal small bowel
- Other names: Push-and-pull enteroscopy
- Specialty: Gastroenterology
- MeSH: D058582

Double-balloon enteroscopy, also known as push-and-pull enteroscopy, is an endoscopic technique for visualization of the small bowel. It was developed by Hironori Yamamoto in 2001. It is novel in the field of diagnostic gastroenterology as it is the first endoscopic technique that allows for the entire gastrointestinal tract to be visualized in real time.

== Technique ==
The technique involves the use of a balloon at the end of a special enteroscope camera and an overtube, which is a tube that fits over the endoscope, and which is also fitted with a balloon. The procedure is usually done under general anesthesia, but may be done with the use of conscious sedation. The enteroscope and overtube are inserted through the mouth and passed in conventional fashion (that is, as with gastroscopy) into the small bowel.

Following this, the endoscope is advanced a small distance in front of the overtube and the balloon at the end is inflated. Using the assistance of friction at the interface of the enteroscope and intestinal wall, the small bowel is accordioned back to the overtube. The overtube balloon is then deployed, and the enteroscope balloon is deflated. The process is then continued until the entire small bowel is visualized.

The double-balloon enteroscope can also be passed in retrograde fashion, through the colon and into the ileum to visualize the end of the small bowel.

== Indications ==
Double-balloon enteroscopy has found a niche application in the following settings:

- Bleeding from the gastrointestinal tract of obscure cause
- Iron deficiency anemia with normal colonoscopy and gastroscopy
- Visualization and therapeutic intervention on abnormalities seen on traditional small bowel imaging
- Endoscopic retrograde cholangiopancreatography (ERCP) in post-surgical patients with long afferent limbs

== Advantages ==
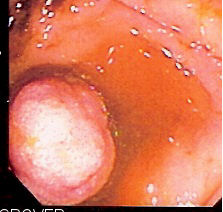
Endoscopic image of polyp in small bowel detected on double-balloon enteroscopy

Double-balloon enteroscopy offers a number of advantages to other small bowel image techniques, including barium imaging, wireless capsule endoscopy and push enteroscopy:

- It allows for visualization of the entire small bowel to the terminal ileum.
- It allows for the application of therapeutics.
- It allows for the sampling or biopsying of small bowel mucosa, for the resection of polyps of the small bowel, and in the placement of stents or dilatation of strictures of the small bowel.
- It allows for access to the papilla in patients with long afferent limbs after Billroth II antrectomy.

== Disadvantages ==
The key disadvantage of double-balloon enteroscopy is the time required to visualize the small bowel; this can exceed three hours, and may require that patients be admitted to hospital for the procedure. There have also been case reports of acute pancreatitis (at a rate of 0.3%–0.4%, when the oral route is used) and intestinal necrosis associated with the technique.

A 2015 study in the World Journal of Gastrointestinal Endoscopy reported that: "Due to prolonged procedure and air insufflation, abdominal pain can be observed in up to 20% patients." Depending on whether the oral or rectal approach was used, a patient may experience a sore throat (following use of the oral route), upset stomach, vomiting, and painful bloating, cramping, or abdominal discomfort in reaction to the gas in the intestines.
