= FX1 =

FX1 may refer to:

- F/X 1, a 1986 film
- Casio FX 1.0/2.0 series, a series of graphic calculators
- Paramotor Inc FX1, a powered paraglider
- Toyota FX-1, a concept car
- Yamaha FX-1, a personal watercraft

== See also ==
- FX (TV channel), a proposed rebrand as "FX1", when "FXX" was proposed to launch as "FX2"
- FX (disambiguation)
- FXI (disambiguation)
- JavaFX version 1.0
