= Round nose =

Round nose may refer to:

- NOHAB Bulldog, a diesel locomotive
- A type of bullet
- A hemispherical diabolo pellet for an air gun
- The 701 model Yahama SuperJet personal watercraft
