= Clayton Jacobson =

Clayton Jacobson may refer to:

- Clayton Jacobson II (1933–2022), American credited with inventing the personal water craft
- Clayton Jacobson (director) (born 1963), Australian film director
