= Wave Blaster =

Wave Blaster may refer to:

- Yamaha WaveBlaster, a personal watercraft produced from 1993 to 1996
- Creative Wave Blaster, a companion MIDI-daughterboard for the Sound Blaster family of PC sound cards
