= Yamaha FX-1 =

The Yamaha FX-1 is a stand-up type personal watercraft (PWC) made by Yamaha Motor Corporation. Part of Yamaha's WaveRunner line of watercraft, it was introduced in 1994 and discontinued in 1995. It was built in very limited numbers and only around 3400 total were made.

It has the same 701cc 61x single carb engine as the 1994 SuperJet but has a lighter and narrower fiberglass hull (compared to the SMC hull on the SuperJet). At 267 pounds, the FX-1 was marketed for its maneuverability.

The FX-1 is similar in size to stand-up skis from the late 1980s and early 1990s and is a departure from the larger race skis that were being introduced at around the same time.

== Motor ==
- Displacement: 701cc, Inline two-cylinder, two-stroke (61X cylinder, 61X cases)
- Rated Power Output: 63 hp
- Premix ratio, gas/oil: 50:1
- Single Carb (Mikuni SBN44) with twin stainless steel 8-petal reed valves
- RPM Limiter: 7050-7150 rpm

== Chassis ==
- Length (in): 83.9
- Width (in): 28
- Height (in): 26.0
- Weight, dry (lb): 267

== Chassis specifications of the SuperJet vs. FX-1 ==
(Taken from the 1994 Yamaha water craft catalog.)

- 88.2 vs 83.9" length
- 26.8 vs 24.8" width
- 26.0 vs 26.6" height
- 290 vs 267 lbs weight

144mm pump vs. 122mm pump
