= WaveRunner =

Personal water craft produced by the Yamaha Motor Company

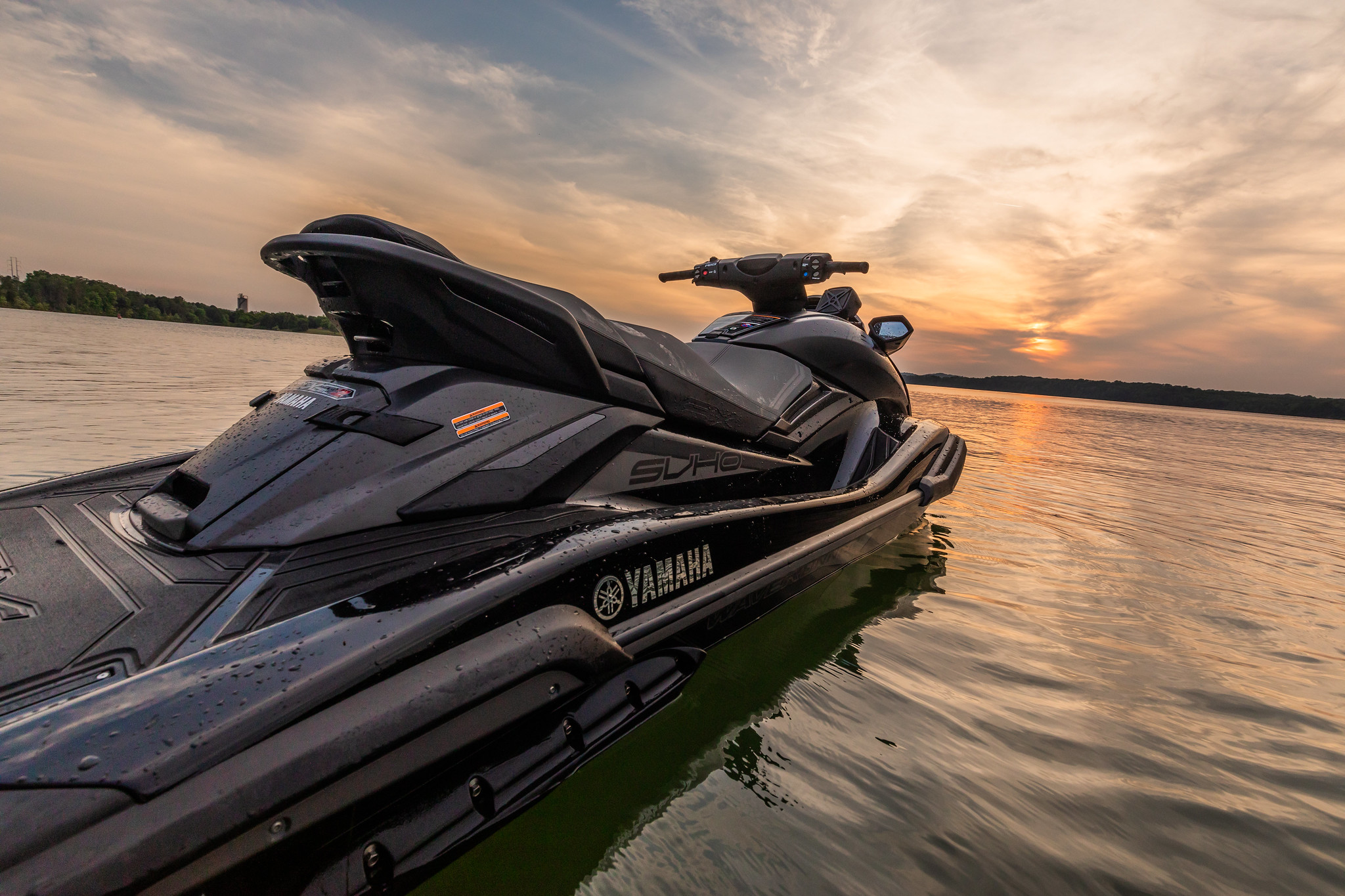
- 2020 Yamaha FX SVHO WaveRunner
- Product type: Personal watercraft
- Produced by: Yamaha Motor Company
- Country: Japan
- Introduced: 1986
- Markets: Worldwide
- Website: www.yamahawaverunners.com

WaveRunner is a trademarked name and type of personal water craft (PWC) produced by the Yamaha Motor Company. Unique to the WaveRunner among PWCs is the spout of water that shoots into the air from the rear of the vehicle, a visual brand identifier that exists as a trademark of Yamaha. It competed primarily with Kawasaki's Jet Ski, BRP's Sea-Doo, Elaqua's E-PWC and Honda's AquaTrax.

== History ==
The first personal watercraft was designed and built in the 1960s by an American motorcycle enthusiast banker, Clayton Jacobson II, and produced and marketed by Bombardier in a licensing agreement. In 1971 Jacobson transferred the license to Kawasaki, resulting in the Jet Ski. Other manufacturers began making similar vehicles in the 1980s, including Yamaha, which had been building watercraft since the '60s, and with whose water vehicle division Jacobson signed on a consultant in 1986. First produced that year, the WaveRunner (then called Marine Jet 500T) was the world's first saddle watercraft, a model which today dominates the market.

In 1987, the handlebars mounted on an articulated arm, characteristic of hand watercraft, were replaced by a fixed handlebar on the WaveJammer 500 (Marine Jet 500S). In 1990, the WaveRunner III 650 (Marine Jet 650TL) was the first personal watercraft to offer a three-person seat and reverse. The same year, Yamaha released the SuperJet 650, its first personal watercraft. Yamaha then diversified its offer into various categories, ranging from models for beginners to those intended for competition listed below:

- 1986 WaveRunner 500 (Marine Jet 500T)
- 1987 WaveJammer 500 (Marine Jet 500S)
- 1990 WaveRunner III 650 (Marine Jet 650TL)
- 1990 Super Jet 650
- 1992 WaveRunner VXR650 (Marine Jet 650TX)
- 1993 WaveRunner Pro VXR700
- 1993 WaveBlaster 700 (Marine Jet 700TZ)
- 1994 WaveRaider 700 (Marine Jet 700RA)
- 1994 WaveRunner 3 GP (701 cc)
- 1995 WaveRaider 1100
- 1995 WaveVenture 700 (Marine Jet 700VN)
- 1996 WaveBlaster II
- 1996 WaveVenture 1100
- 1997 WaveRunner GP 1200
- 1998 WaveRunner XL 1200
- 1999 WaveRunner SUV 1200
- 1999 WaveRunner XL 1200 Ltd.
- 2000 WaveRunner GP 1200R
- 2001 WaveRunner XLT 1200
- 2002 WaveRunner FX140
- 2003 WaveRunner GP 1300R
- 2005 WaveRunner VX Deluxe
- 2006 WaveRunner FX Cruiser High Output
- 2008 WaveRunner FX Cruiser SHO
- 2009 WaveRunner FZR
- 2011 WaveRunner VXR
- 2014 WaveRunner FX Cruiser SVHO
- 2016 WaveRunner VX Limited
- 2017 WaveRunner GP 1800
- 2018 WaveRunner FX Limited SVHO
- 2019 WaveRunner EXR
- 2019 WaveRunner GP 1800R

== Models ==
Retired products in the WaveRunner line include the Yamaha WaveBlaster, Yamaha WaveRaider, Yamaha WaveVenture, Yamaha XL Series, Yamaha GP Series (Two-Stroke) and the Yamaha WaveJammer.

The Yamaha Motor Company currently produces five different series of WaveRunners. They are:

- EX Series
- VX Series
- FX Series
- Performance Race Series
- SuperJet

== Video game ==
WaveRunner
- Developer: Sega AM-1
- Publisher: Sega
- Platform: Arcade
- Release: 1996
- Genre: Racing
- Modes: Single player, multiplayer
- Arcade system: Sega Model 2

WaveRunner is a Sega racing arcade game developed and released in 1996. The game was built on the Sega Model 2 arcade hardware. The game is based on the water craft of the same name by Yamaha, which Sega consulted with when making the game. The game was reviewed by Hyper magazine and rated 4 out of 5 stars.

WaveRunner was designed in a cabinet that resembled an actual WaveRunner model. The game features three courses: "Novice", "Intermediate", and "Expert". Players can do tricks on ramps. Players steer by either turning the handlebars or using their weight to make the WaveRunner model lean in the direction of a turn. Up to four cabinets can be linked together for multiplayer racing.

WaveRunner wasn't ported to any home systems. This game is emulated on the Model 2 Emulator by ELSemi.

A sequel, WaveRunner GP, was released in 2001 and used the NAOMI hardware and was available on standard cabinet and deluxe cabinet, which is the same cabinet as the first game. However, The standard cabinet was actually a cabinet of Arctic Thunder, which released by Midway a year earlier in 2000.

== See also ==
- Sea-Doo
- Jet Ski
