= Tigershark PWC =

TS 1100R
- Manufacturer: Tigershark
- Parent company: Arctic Cat
- Production: 1999
- Predecessor: TS 1000R
- Class: Sport PWC
- Engine: 1,100 cc (67 cu in) liquid-cooled two-stroke
- Bore / stroke: 85 x 64.6mm
- Top speed: < 60 Mph
- Ignition type: CDI
- Transmission: axial flow jet pump w/ 148mm stainless-steel stator
- Dimensions: L: 118 in. W: 44.5 in. H: 41 In.
- Weight: 550 lbs. (dry)
- Fuel capacity: 16 Gallons
- Oil capacity: 5 Quarts
- Related: MSRP; $7699.99
- Footnotes / references References

Tigershark is a defunct subsidiary of Arctic Cat that produced personal watercraft (PWC) from 1993 until 1999. Tigershark PWCs were designed to be light, sporty and inexpensive, but early models had a reputation for poor build quality, and the brand suffered, despite significant improvements with the introduction of the 1997 models. The line was introduced in 1993 as a singular Tigershark model. Across seven years, the brand would consist of 20 offerings between two unique hull designs, three various lengths, and two engines in various trim and sizes.

The initial hull design, referred to as the Tigershark Hull, was offered in three lengths, a sporty 8', more comfortable 9', and two passenger 10'. In 1998, Tigershark released their abbreviated TS Hull. This was available in a 9' and two passenger 10' lengths. Engine configurations included a 639 / 768 cc (39.0 / 46.9 cu in) liquid-cooled two-stroke Twin, or 846 to 1,100 cc (51.6 to 67.1 cu in) liquid-cooled two-stroke Triples across the line.

== Models ==
=== Tigershark Hull design ===
- Barracuda (1994–1995) An 8', 385 lbs (Dry Weight) Model featuring a 72Hp 639cc Suzuki Twin
- Daytona (1994–1995) A 9', 410 lbs (Dry Weight) Model featuring a 72Hp 639cc Suzuki Twin
- Daytona 1000 770 (1996–1997) A 9', 410 lbs (Dry Weight) Model featuring a 90Hp 639cc Suzuki Twin
- Daytona 1000 (1997) A 9', 515 lbs (Dry Weight) Model featuring a 115Hp 999cc Suzuki Triple
- Monte Carlo/640 (1994–1997) A 10', Two-passenger 560 lbs (Dry Weight) Model featuring a 62Hp 639cc Suzuki Twin
- Monte Carlo 770 (1996–1997) A 10', Two-passenger 560 lbs (Dry Weight) Model featuring a 90Hp 768cc Suzuki Twin
- Monte Carlo 900 (1996) A 10', Two-passenger 645 lbs (Dry Weight) Model featuring a 105Hp 896cc Suzuki Triple
- Monte Carlo1000 (1997) A 10', Two-passenger 645 lbs (Dry Weight) Model featuring a 115Hp 999cc Suzuki Triple
- Montego (1994–1997) A 9', 415 lbs (Dry Weight) Model featuring a 62Hp 639cc Suzuki Twin
- Montego DX/Deluxe (1994–1997) A 10', Two-passenger 645 lbs (Dry Weight) Model featuring a 62Hp 639cc Suzuki Twin
- Tigershark (1993) A 9', 410 lbs (Dry Weight) Model featuring a 62Hp 639cc Suzuki Twin
- Tigershark 900 (1995) A 10', Two-passenger 645 lbs (Dry Weight) Model featuring a 100Hp 896cc Suzuki Triple

=== TS Hull design ===
- TS 640 (1998–1999) A 9', 405 lbs (Dry Weight) Model featuring a 62Hp 639cc Suzuki Twin
- TS 640L (1998) A 10', Two-passenger 540 lbs (Dry Weight) Model featuring a 62Hp 639cc Suzuki Twin
- TS 770 (1998–1999) A 9', 412 lbs (Dry Weight) Model featuring an 80Hp 768cc Suzuki Twin
- TS 770L (1998–1999) A 10', Two-passenger 560 lbs (Dry Weight) Model featuring a 90Hp 768cc Suzuki Twin
- TS 770R (1998) A 9', 470 lbs (Dry Weight) Model featuring a 90Hp 768cc Suzuki Twin
- TS 900L (1998) A 10', Two-passenger 645 lbs (Dry Weight) Model featuring a 105Hp 999cc Suzuki Triple
- TS 1000L/LI (1998–1999) A 10', Two-passenger 645 lbs (Dry Weight) Model featuring a 115 hp(L)/120Hp(LI) 999cc Suzuki Triple
- TS 1000R (1998) A 9', 515 lbs (Dry Weight) Model featuring a 115Hp 999cc Suzuki Triple
- TS 1100R (1999) A 9', Two-passenger 550 lbs (Dry Weight) Model featuring a 135Hp 1100cc Suzuki Triple

=== Spirit Marine ===
Parent company Arctic Cat had attempted one previous foray into Water Sports, with subsidiary Spirit Marine. In 1978 they brought the Wetbike to the market, a straddled planing watercraft. A variation would be seen in the James Bond movie, The Spy who Loved Me, ridden by star Roger Moore. The machine was built by Spirit Marine and various licensed manufacturers until 1992.

== Lawsuit ==
In 2016, Tigershark was awarded $46.7 million for patent infringements related to off-throttle assisted steering technology. Initially awarded $15.5 million by jury in the U.S. District Court for the Southern District of Florida, a Judge ordered Triple Damages days later. The Jury voted unanimously against the defendant, citing willful infringement of all asserted claims.
