= Jet ski =

Recreational watercraft

A watercraft on the Mekong River

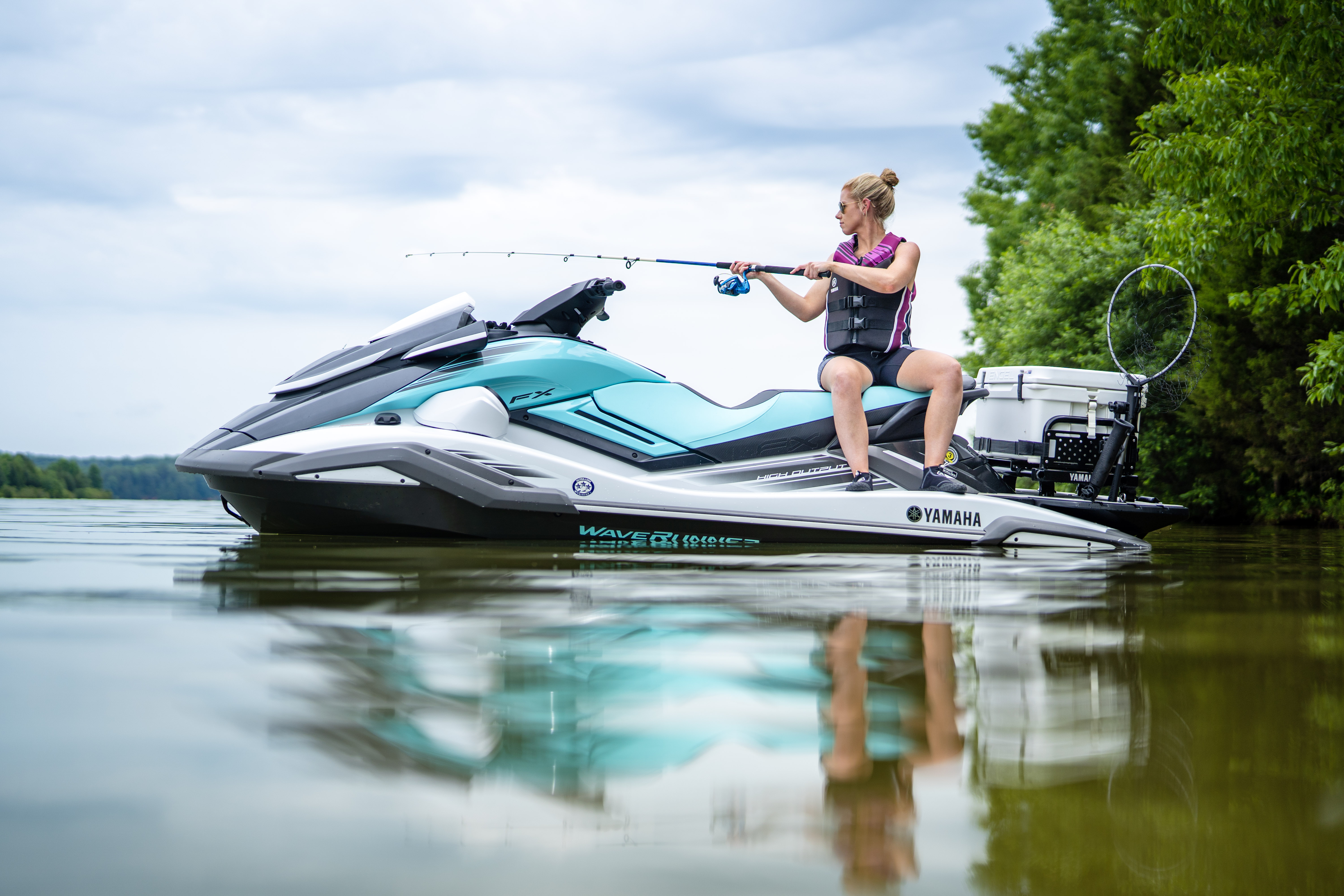
Overall view of personal watercraft

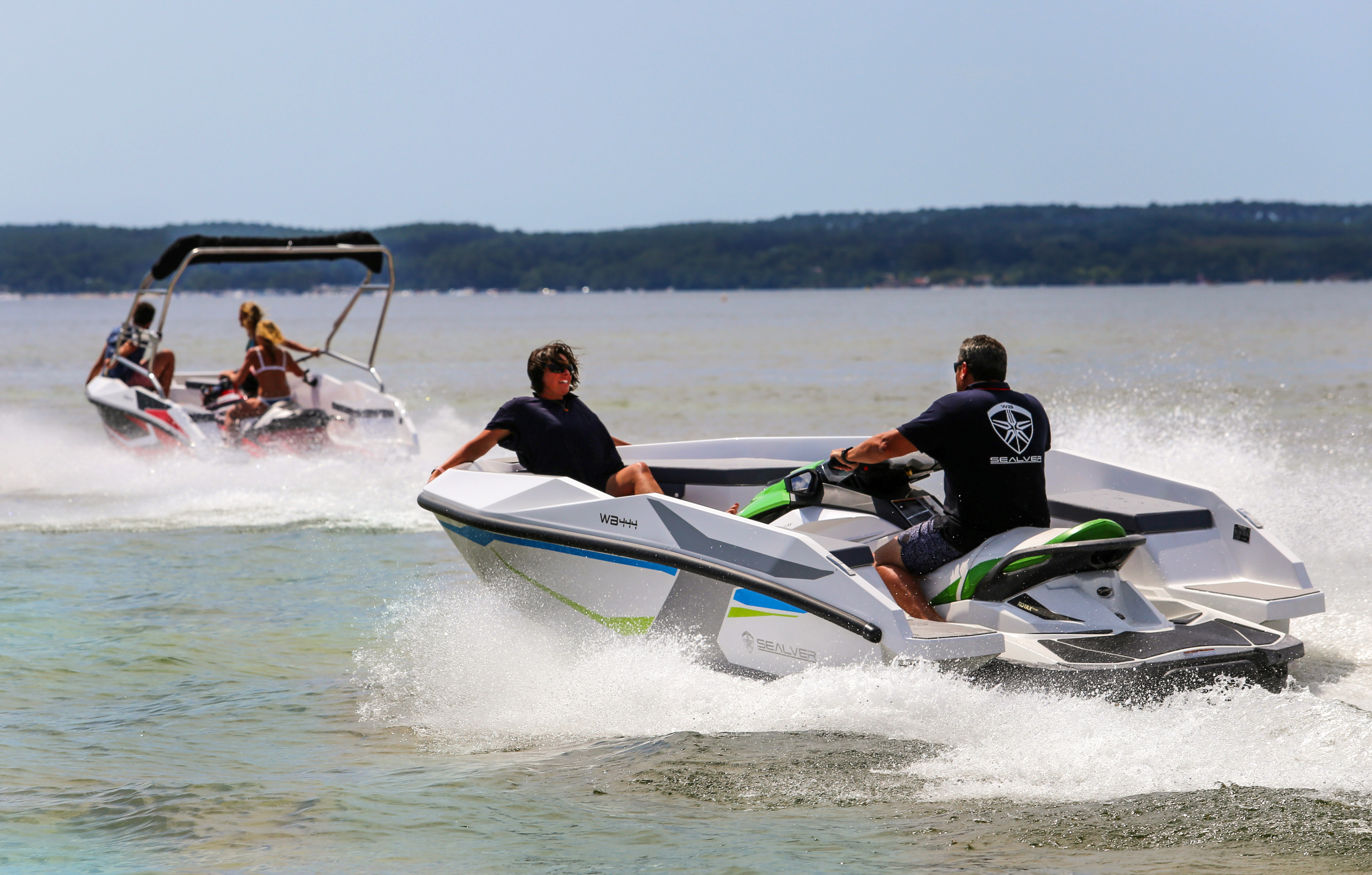
A personal watercraft Waveboat conversion

A jet ski —often referred to as a jetski or personal watercraft (PWC), after the product line by Kawasaki, or water scooter—comically referred to as a boater-cycle, is a primarily recreational watercraft that is designed to carry a small number of occupants, who sit or stand on top of the craft, not within the craft as in a boat.

Personal watercraft are often referred to by the brand names of Kawasaki's Jet Ski, Yamaha's WaveRunner, BRP's Sea-Doo, Elaqua's E-PWC and Honda's AquaTrax.

PWCs have two style categories. The first and the most popular is a compact runabout, typically holding no more than two or three people, who mainly sit on top of the watercraft as one does when riding an ATV or snowmobile. The second style is a "stand-up" type, typically built for only one occupant who operates the watercraft standing up as in riding a kick scooter; it is often used more for doing tricks, racing, and in competitions. Both styles have an inboard engine driving a pump-jet that has a screw-shaped impeller to create thrust for propulsion and steering. Most are designed for two or three people, though four-passenger models exist. Many of today's models are built for more extended use and have the fuel capacity to make long cruises, in some cases even beyond 160 kilometres (100 miles).

Personal watercraft boat conversion kits exist as Waveboats.

The United States Coast Guard defines a personal watercraft, among other criteria, as a jet-drive boat less than 12 feet (3.7 m) long. There are many larger "jetboats" not classed as PWCs, some more than 40 feet (12 m) long.

== History ==
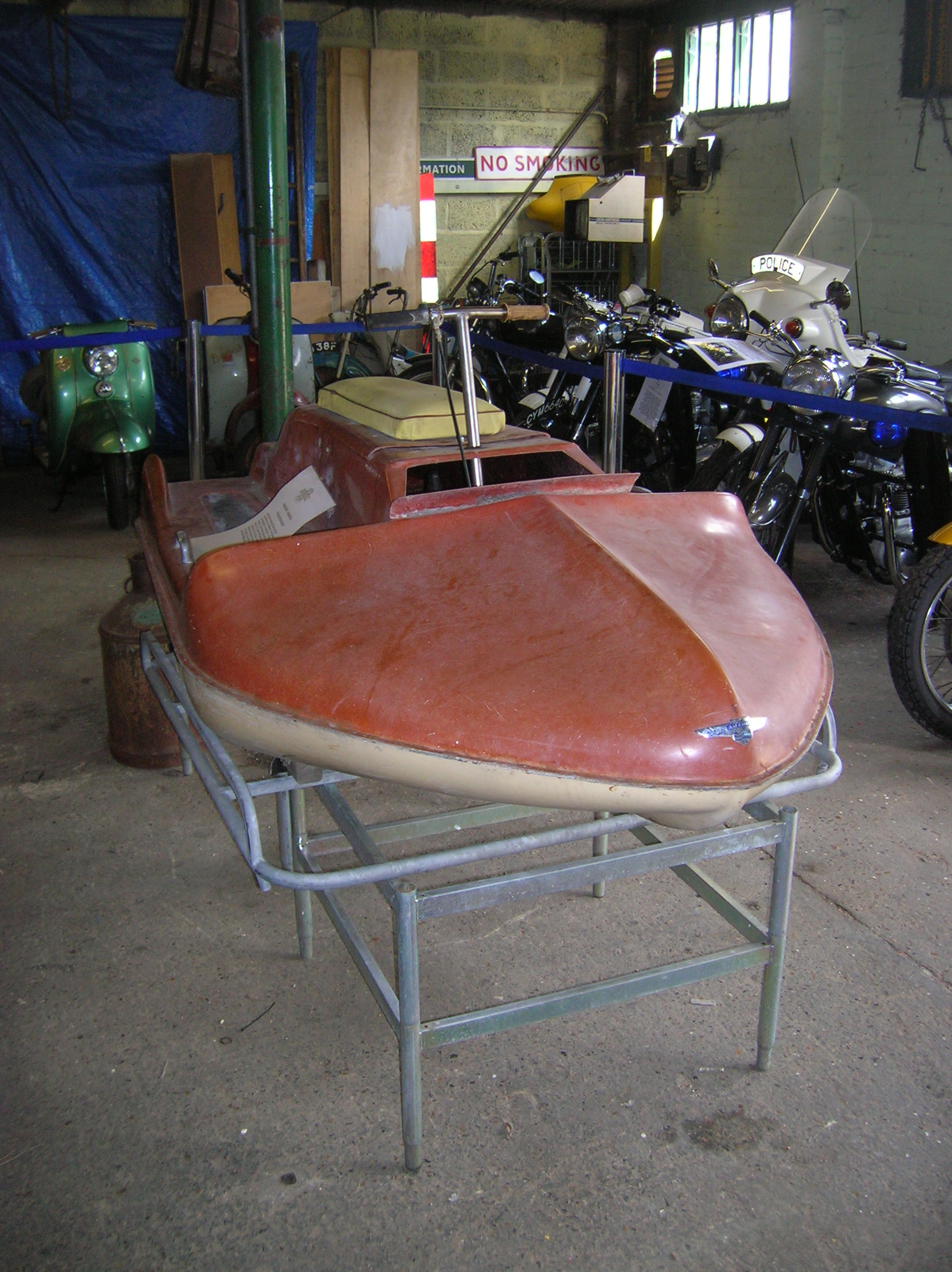
Vincent Amanda at the London Motorcycle Museum

Water scooters—as they were originally termed—were first developed in the United Kingdom and Europe in the mid-1950s, with models such as the British 200cc propeller-driven Vincent Amanda, and the German Wave Roller. Two thousand Vincent Amandas were exported to Australia, Asia, Europe and the United States.

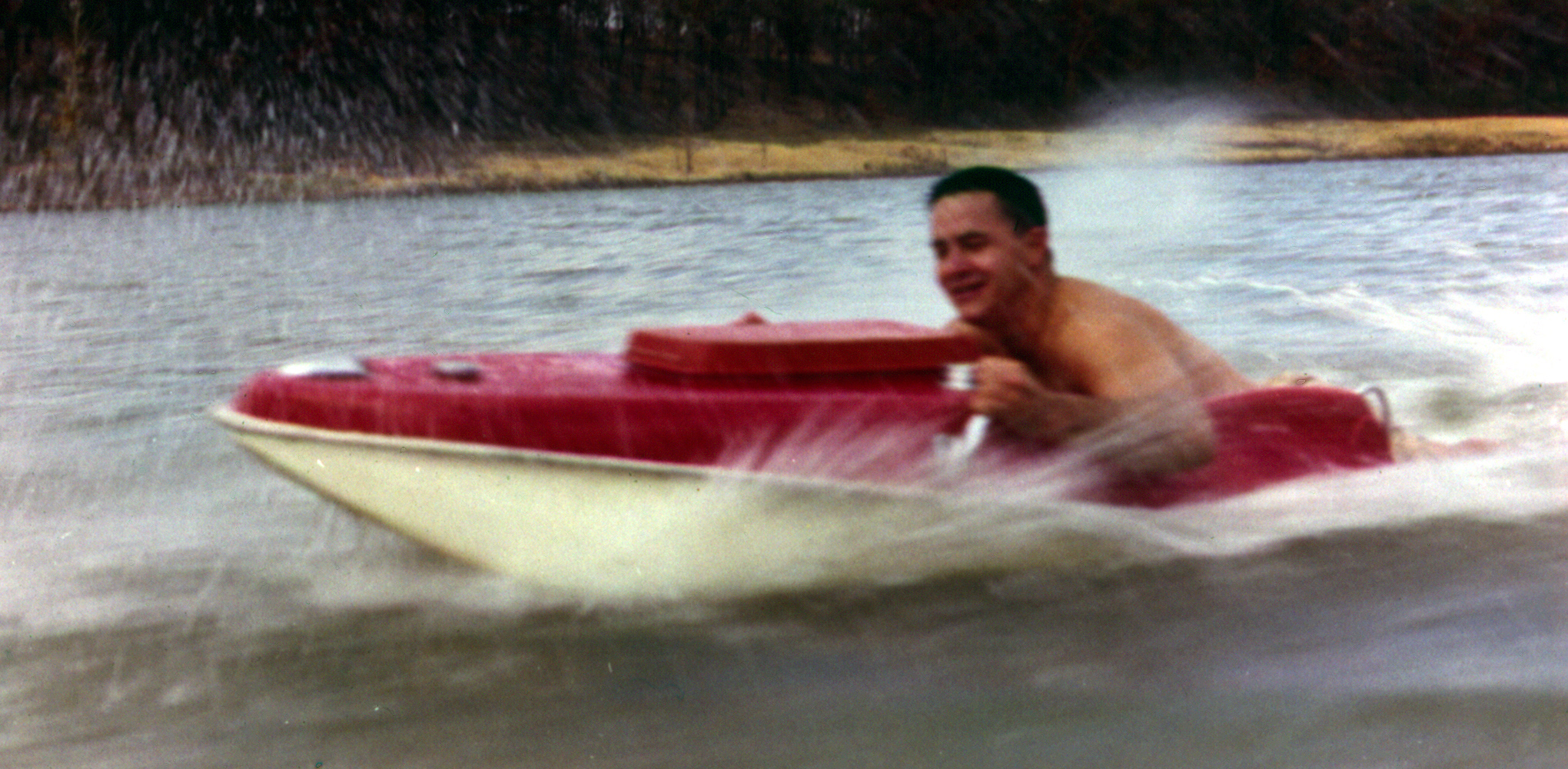
1961 Sea Skimmer / Aqua Skimmer could reach speeds up to 40km/h

The Sea Skimmer was introduced in 1961 as a highly maneuverable version of a propelled surfboard. It was 1.7 m (5.6 ft) long, powered by an inboard/outboard motor and reached speeds up to 40 km/h (25 mph). The rider lay on the boat, controlling the speed with hand throttles and using the feet as rudders. Originally manufactured in Kansas City, operations moved to Boynton, Florida, in 1962, and the name was changed to Aqua-Skimmer. Aqua-Skimmer ceased operations in 1962 and sold its inventory to the military. Renamed Aqua Dart (Aqua Dart INC), the Sea Skimmer, Aqua Skimmer, Aqua Dart was modified for military requirements, and saw service in 1962 river reconnaissance missions in Vietnam and other military missions until the 1970s.

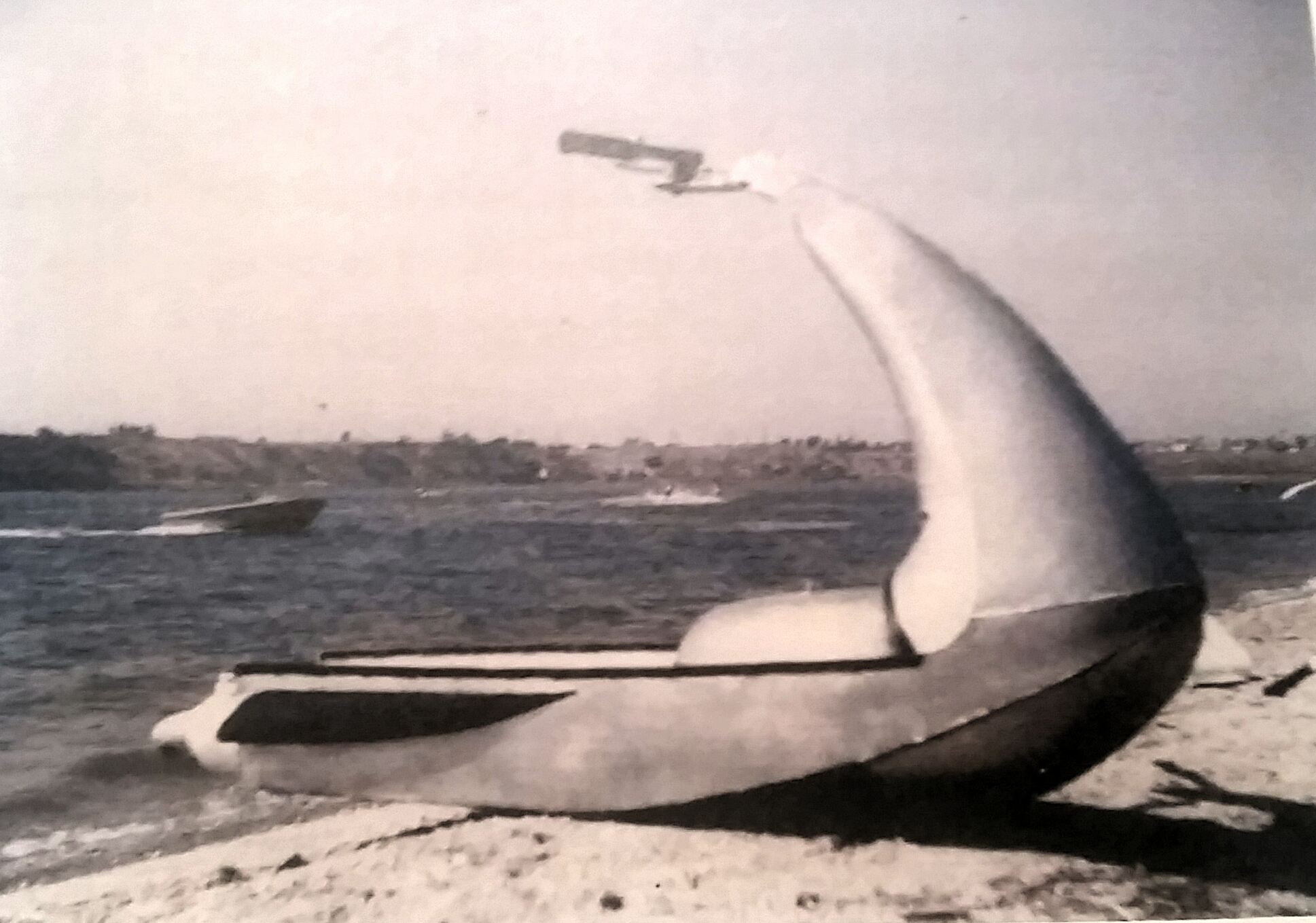
The first stand-up prototype

In the 1960s, the idea was developed further by Clayton Jacobson II of Lake Havasu City, Arizona, US. Originally a motocross enthusiast, Jacobson's idea was designed in the mid-1960s, powered by an internal pump-jet rather than an outboard motor, made of all aluminum, and had a fixed, upright handle. Jacobson eventually quit his job in banking to devote himself to developing the idea, and had a working prototype by 1965. It differed slightly from modern personal watercraft but had definite similarities. He completed a second prototype a year later made of fiberglass. The first Clayton-type PWC to reach the market was designed by Bombardier in the late 1960s. Bombardier's original designs were not very popular and Bombardier left the business before 1970.

In Greece, an inventor named Dimitrios T. Moraitidis, built a prototype and submitted a patent to the government of the Kingdom of Greece on the 5 June 1970, with serial number 40056. This prototype has never been made available commercially as of Moraitidis' death on 5 March 2022.

Stand-up PWCs were first produced by the Japanese company Kawasaki (under the Jet Ski brand) in 1972, and appeared on the US market in 1973. These were mass-produced boats to be used by only one rider. While they are still produced today, the more popular design is the sit-down variety of PWC. These sit-down runabouts have been produced by Kawasaki (Jetski), Bombardier (Sea-Doo), Yamaha (WaveRunner), Honda (AquaTrax), Polaris (Sealion) and Arctic Cat (Tigershark). As of 2010, the major manufacturers of PWCs were Kawasaki, Bombardier and Yamaha. Both Yamaha and Kawasaki continue to sell stand-up models but it is a small percentage of the overall market.

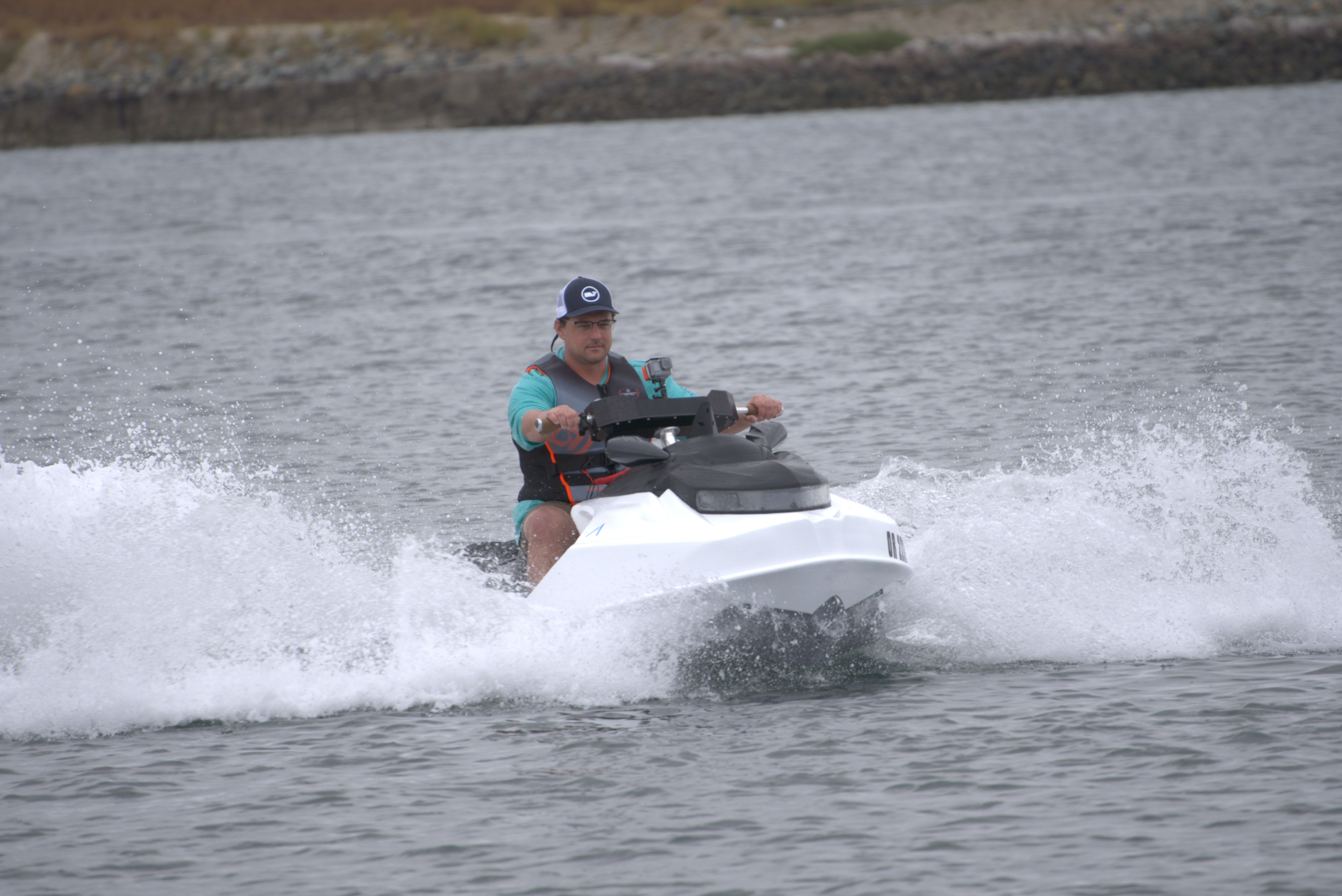
An electric personal watercraft

Electric PWCs were commercialized in the early 2020s. Electric watercraft are increasing in popularity as gasoline engines produce greenhouse gases and can eject motor oil and gasoline directly into waterways.

== Sports ==
PWC racing competitions take place around the world. There are several disciplines: closed circuit speed races, offshore speed races (offshore), endurance races, freestyle (freestyle) and freeride events. For all these types of events, with the exception of freestyle, there are at least two categories: saddle jets and stand-up jets. For speed races, gear is generally classified according to the degree of authorized modifications: minor modifications fall into the so-called "stock" category, intermediate modifications into the so-called "limited" category, and more extensive modifications into the category. known as "F1". In freestyle and freeride, these categories do not exist; rather, the competitors are classified according to the type of watercraft used (with stand-up or saddle).

The sport is ruled by the World Powerboating Federation (Union Internationale Motonautique, U.I.M.) recognised by the International Olympic Committee. The current official world series, established in 1996, is the Aquabike World Championship. The sport is also established at the national level and is ruled by each national federation's member of the U.I.M. Aquabike World Championship is known among the motorsports with most different national entries for each competition, reaching up to 32 nationalities and 140 riders registered to compete in Italy in 2018.

In the United States, the main sanctioning bodies are the International Jet Sport Boating Association (IJSBA) and Pro Watercross (PWX).

== Non-recreational uses ==
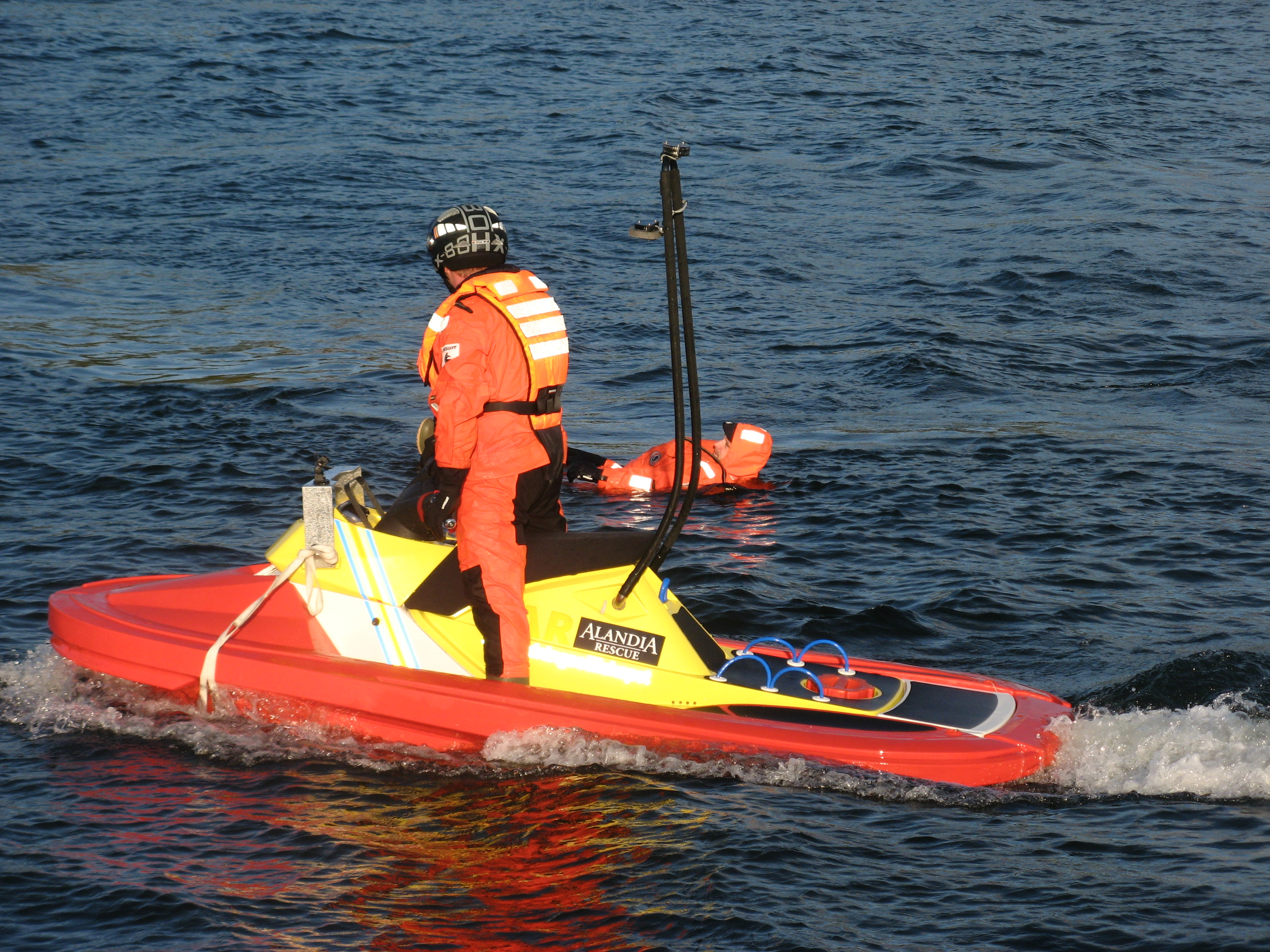
PWC with rescue platform.

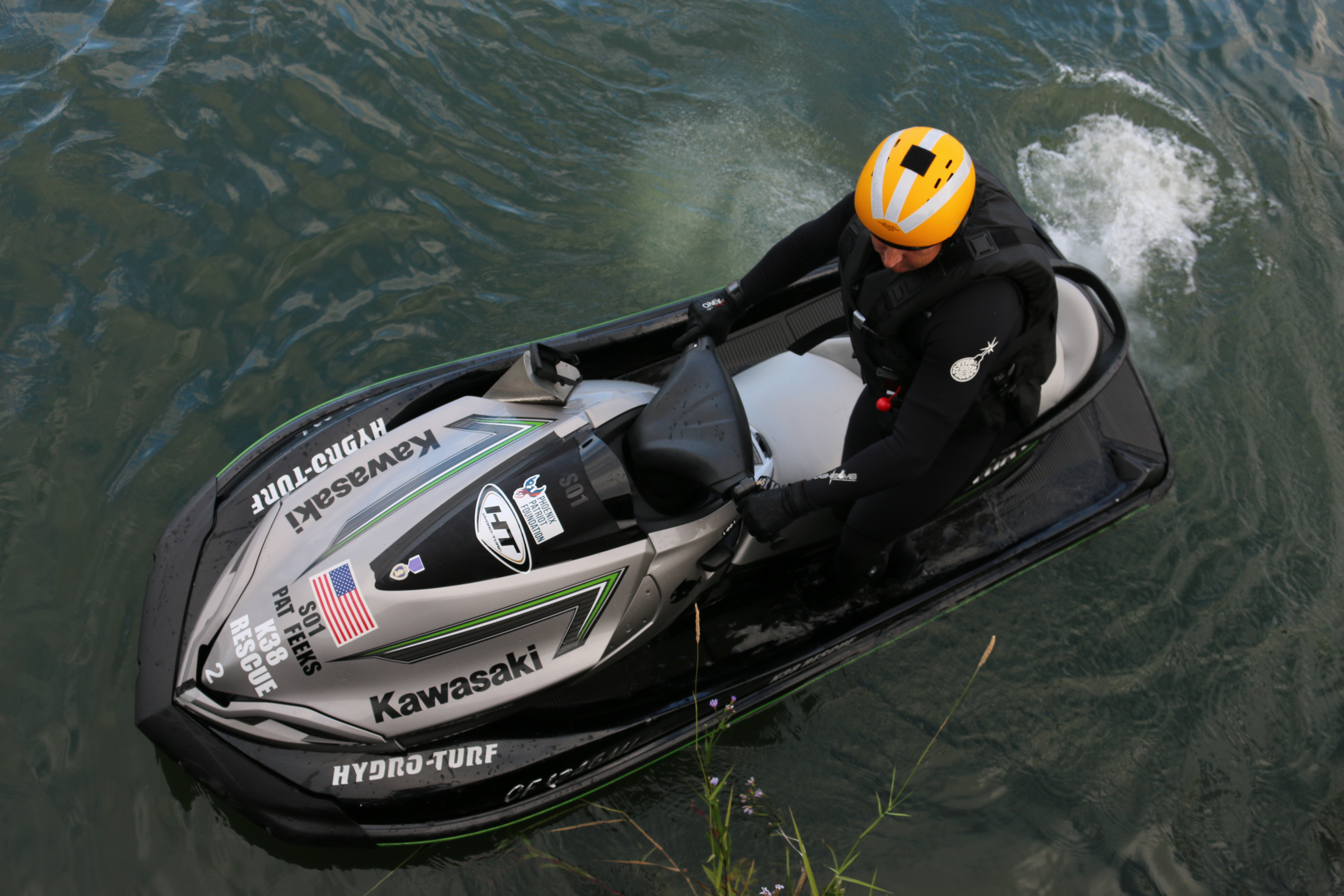
Training preparedness Rescue Water Craft

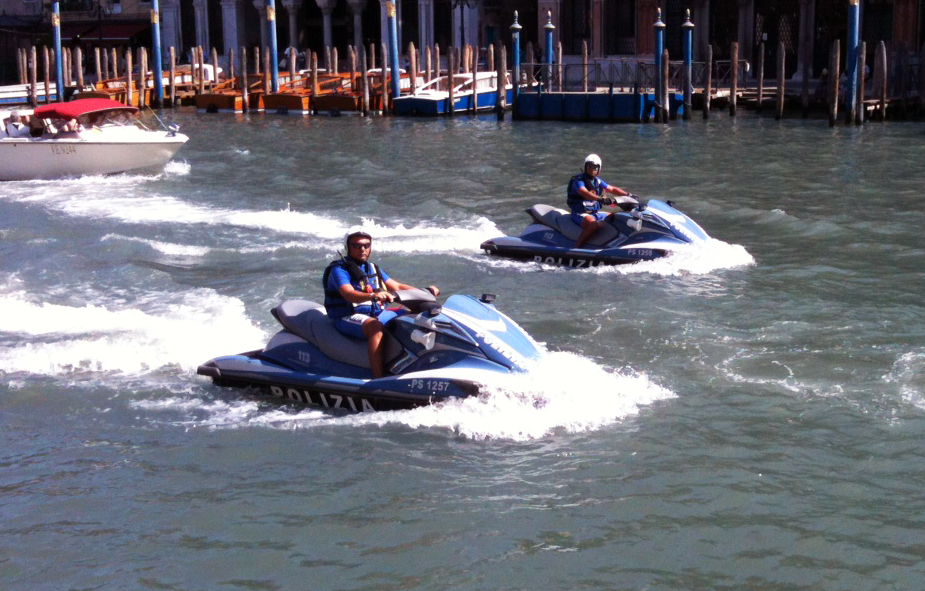
PWC used by the Italian police in Venice

PWC propulsion systems do not have external propellers, making them in some respects safer than small motorboats for swimmers and wildlife. For these reasons, they are used for fishing, one of the PWC industry's fastest-growing segments.

Lifeguards use PWCs equipped with rescue platforms to rescue water users from trouble, as well as flood survivors, and carry them to safety. Police and rangers use them to enforce laws in coastal waters, lakes and rivers. A PWC combined with a wash-reduction system, carrying waterproof loudspeaker equipment and GPS for instructions and distance measurement, has reportedly been used by assistant coaches for rowing sports on the River Tyne.

US Special Forces use the Kraka Jet Board.

== Hazards ==
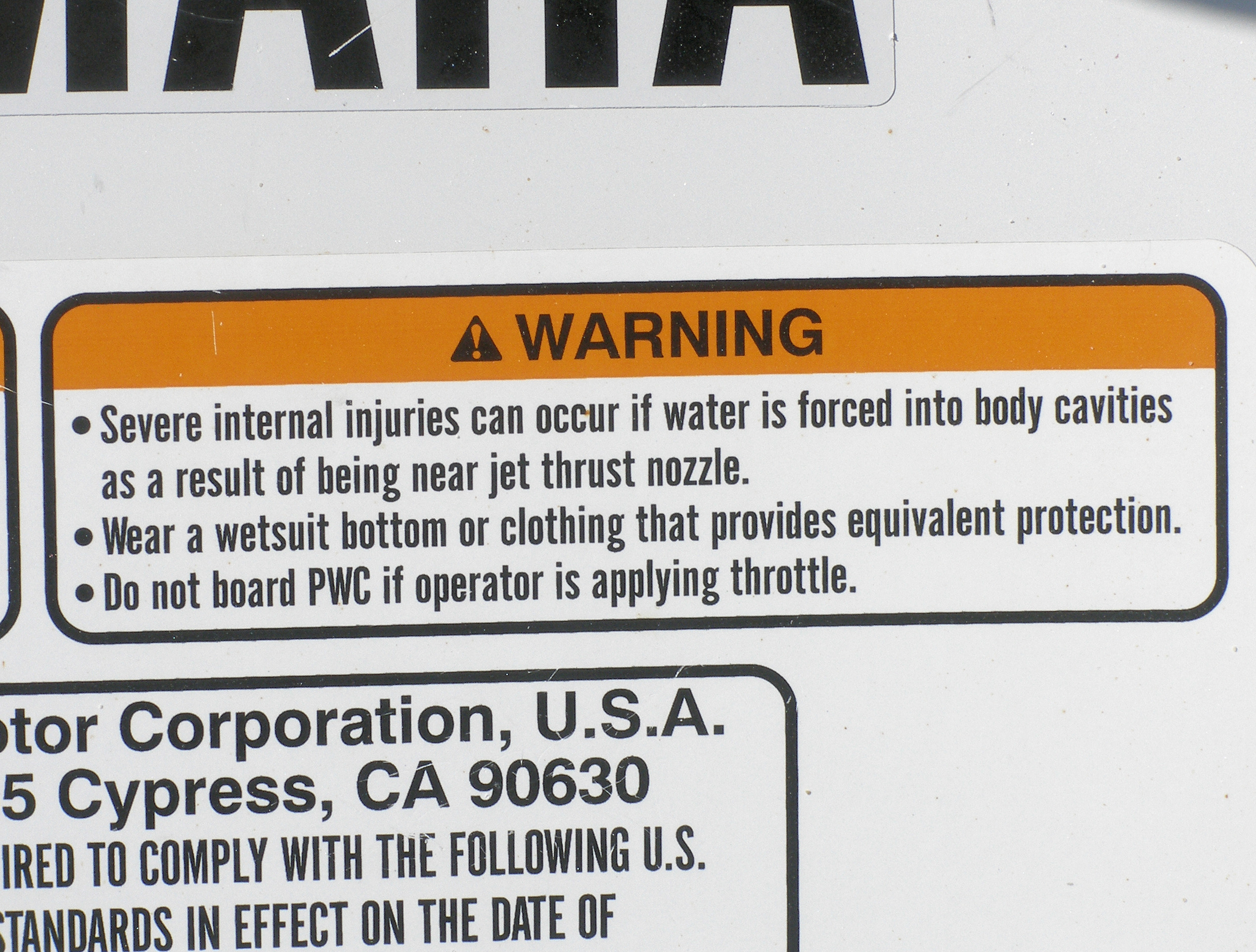
PWC warning label indicating risk of body cavity injuries

Apart from the obvious hazards of collisions and mechanical breakdowns common to all vehicles, operating or riding a PWC can involve a risk of orifice injuries. These injuries are typical of the kinds of injuries that waterskiers experience as a result of falling into the water at speed. Such injuries can occur from simply falling in the water at speed or they can occur from the output end of the pump jet. A rider who falls (or is ejected) off the back can land directly in the path of the PWC's high-pressure jet of water. Unless a rider is appropriately dressed in garments made out of a strong, thick substance like neoprene (as is commonly found in wetsuits), the jet may penetrate any orifice it reaches. All major PWC manufacturers warn about this risk and recommend that passengers wear wet suit bottoms or equivalent protection. The American Waterski Racing Association recommends that all of their racers wear wet suit bottoms for this same reason.

Such orifice injuries can result in permanent disability or death. For example, in 2006, the California Court of Appeal for the First Appellate District upheld a $3.7 million Napa County jury verdict against Polaris Industries arising out of one such incident (which had devastating effects on the victim's lower abdomen). It is also possible for multiple riders on the same PWC to sustain orifice injuries in a single accident, as actually occurred in a 2007 accident at Mission Bay which resulted in a San Diego County jury verdict affirmed in full on appeal in 2014.

Another noteworthy risk of injury is known as off throttle steering, which results from the lack of steering capability while off throttle in certain models of PWCs. This can result in death or serious bodily injuries.

While also rare, spinal injuries can occur while surf jumping and, potentially, wake jumping. The PWC manufacturers' owner's manuals all include warnings regarding jumping at excessive heights, or operating a PWC if there is a prior history of back injury. The current on-product labels say "Jumping wakes or waves can increase the risk of spinal/backbone injuries (paralysis)". The current Kawasaki owner's manual provides: "Slow down before crossing waves. Do not ride if you have a back condition. High speed operation in choppy or rough water may cause back injuries."

Another rare, but unique injury risk with jetboats, is being sucked into the intake side of the pump jet. Current PWC products contain on-product warnings that state: "'Keep away from Intake Grate' while the engine is on. Items such as long hair, loose clothing, or PFD straps can become entangled in moving parts and result in severe injury or drowning".

There have been fatal accidents involving PWCs. In a notable case, US astronaut Alan G. Poindexter died in 2012 from injuries sustained in a Jet Ski accident in Florida.

== See also ==
- Aqua scooter (of historical interest)
- Jetboard
- Flyboard
- Video games featuring personal watercraft:
  - Jet X2O
  - Splashdown
  - Wave Race
    - Wave Race 64
    - Wave Race: Blue Storm
- Wetbike
- Yamaha Superjet
- Yamaha Wave Blaster
