= Sea Skimmer, Aqua Skimmer, Aqua Dart =

Commercial PWC development and subsequent use by the US Naval Special Warfare Command

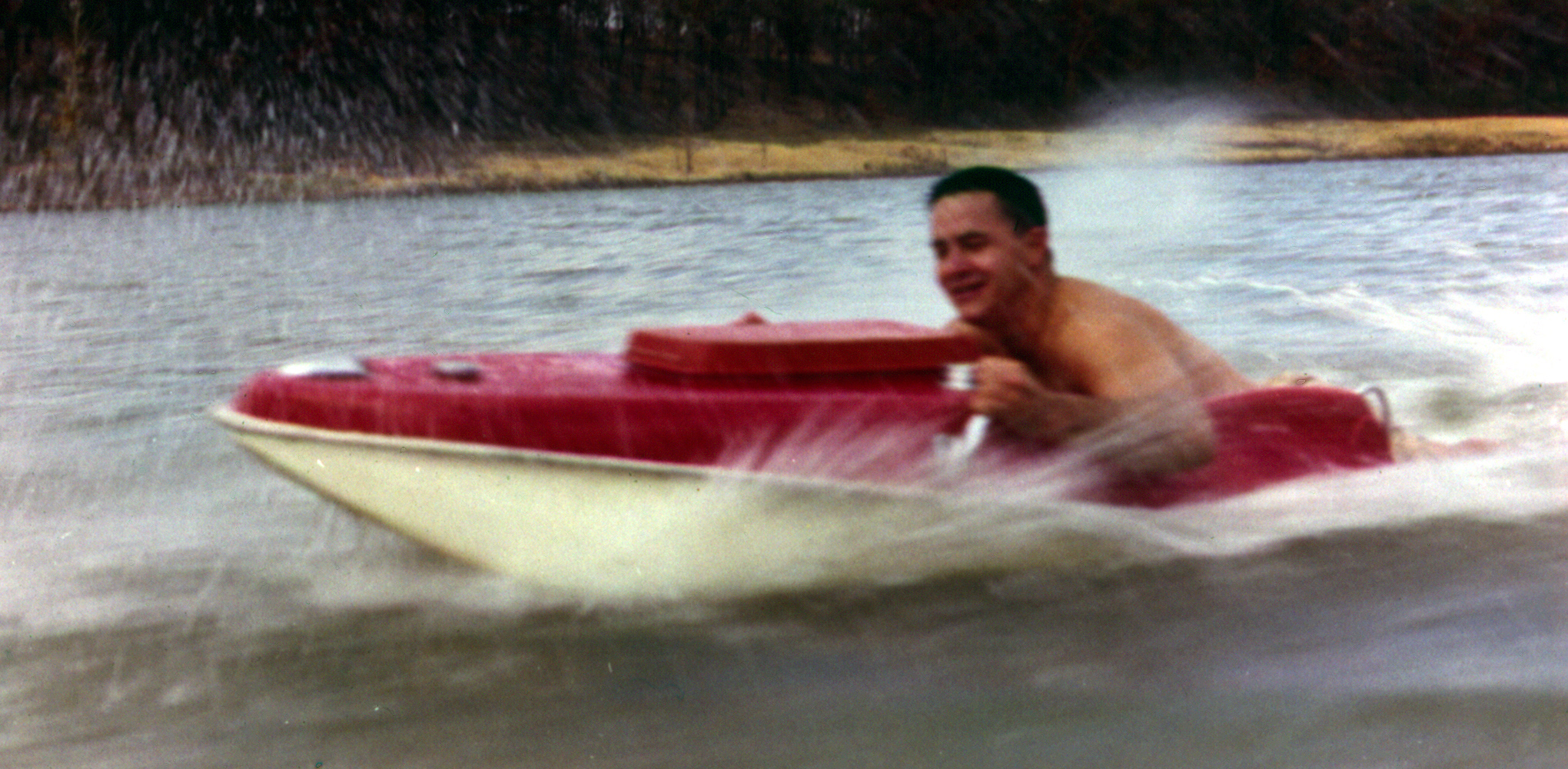
1961 Aqua Sport Sea Skimmer could reach speeds up to 25 MPH

The Sea Skimmer was a leisure Personal Watercraft (PWC) unique within the family of Personal Watercraft, whereas the operator laid prone on the boat and steered with shifting leg motions and body weight to control the craft, reaching speeds up to 25 MPH. The Sea Skimmer (renamed Aqua Skimmer) preceded the modern Jet Ski / Sea Doo. It was transferred into classified Military service in 1962 with boats modified by Aqua Dart INC. It was instrumental in River Reconnaissance missions during the Vietnam war by the United States Naval Special Warfare Command.

== Sea Skimmer/Aqua Skimmer ==
The Sea Skimmer was made by Aqua Sport, Inc. of Lawrence, Kansas from May 1959 through December 1962. The Sea Skimmer was designed for family recreation, touting the ability to pull water skiers, carry cargo or an additional person. It offered a model with reduced speed (battery powered) for "child safe" family fun. The boats were sized such that a pair of Skimmers would fit within the trunk of a typical car or the rear of a station wagon (in the 1960s) and hand carried by two people. In 1959, the fiberglass hull technology was cutting edge in the boating community.

Aqua Sport, Inc. of Kansas City transferred operations to "AquaSkimmer Inc" of Boynton Beach Florida on April 11 1962, intending to develop an hourly rental market for tourists as well as individual boat sales. It was featured as a base for skin diving, pulling a water skier, ship to shore transportation in rescue work, a lifesaving boats for beaches, and a float for deep water swimming. The Aqua Skimmer appeared in boat shows and sporting events nationwide. John Tetyak was the new corporate officer and he claimed to be "the inventor of the concept".

The Coast Guard classified the Aqua Skimmer as an "Ocean-Going Vessel" requiring extensive modifications for offshore recreational use. Aqua Skimmer INC, ceased activity by 1963. The corporation known as "Aqua Skimmer INC" was eventually dissolved June 7, 1966.

== Government interest ==
1966 Aqua Dart delivered to Joint Expeditionary Base, Little Creek VA, published by Democrat and Chronicle of Rochester, NY (September 20, 1966)

In early 1961, Aqua Skimmer INC provided 5 boats to the US Navy for testing and evaluation with custom modifications said to include being painted black and adding reinforced gun mounts.

According to The Palm Beach Post Thursday, September 27, 1962, "The Navy has been using 5 models for Testing and Evaluation. [Company spokesman John Tetyak] declined to say how many boats the Navy wanted but said it would be a sizeable order. Filling the governments order will require a large increase in the number of employees... The boats are being altered to meet specifications set up by the Navy"

According to the Pensacola News Journal, December 14, 1962, Aqua Skimmer, Inc. announced an R&D contract with the Navy "for all the boats now being produced in conformity to Naval Specifications at the firm's local warehouse, to be delivered to an undisclosed area in the Caribbean for further evaluation by all branches of the armed services".

1970 Aqua Dart Marine Force Recon US Marine Corps Photo published in the St Louis Post Dispatch(Jan 28, 1970)

A militarized version known as "Aqua Dart" was created (July 1963 patent). The Aqua Dart was designated USNX 1-AD (US Navy Experimental 1-Aqua Dart). (Declassified July 2022).

Documents regarding Aqua Skimmer / Aqua Dart, obtained through a Freedom of Information Request, details UDT-12, UDT-22 and Seal Team 2 operational evaluations of both the Aqua Skimmer and Aqua Dart. This group of NARA records (Record Group 38) reflect the Navy's interest in special warfare, particularly in relationship to the conflict involving South Vietnam. The Naval Special Warfare Group, Pacific, specifically was responsible for the readiness and training of such units as the UDTs, SEALs, Beach Jumper Units, and small inshore warfare craft, including PTFs (airborne frogmen). These files relate especially to the development of new equipment and other technical matters that were of interest to unconventional naval forces.

UDT-12, Underwater Demolition Team-12 (the predecessor to the Navy Seals) conducted an evaluation of the Aqua Dart as a "River Reconnaissance System".

UDT-22/Seal Team-2. In 1966, the modified Aqua Skimmer "Aqua Dart" (22 HP Model) was evaluated in two independent studies. First as a Swimmer Delivery Vehicle (SDV) by the Navy's "Underwater Demolition Team-22"(August 1966); and second, by the Navy's "Seal Team Two" (Sept 1966). Evaluation results listed several future mission opportunities for the Aqua Dart within the Navy's immediate needs.

== Design and operations ==
Harry Hoch was responsible for design, development, test, project accountability for Aqua Sport, Inc, as well as a major investor. The company was registered under the Blue sky law in Missouri under a licensed patent by AQUA-JET® for design and development of the Sea Skimmer.

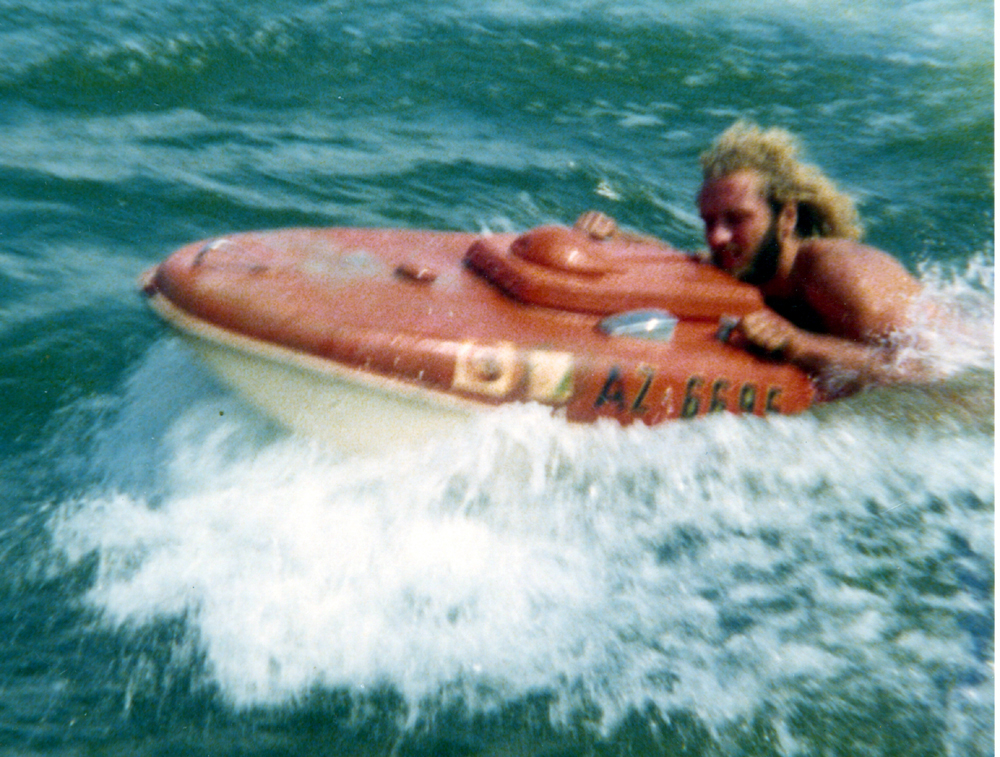
1975 Sea Skimmer - Pyramid Lake Reservoir, Los Angeles County CA.

The New York Times published the original announcement for this Aqua Sport Sea Skimmer on Jan 15, 1961 calling it a "POWER SWIM UNIT, and "NEW Aqua Sport's Sea Skimmer Is Capable of 25 M.P.H". The article detailed the three models and their respective performance capabilities.

- DOLPHIN - 22 horsepower / 25 MPH/ gas operated / propeller driven with KORT nozzle (ducted propeller), Wet and Snorkel exhaust
- SKATE - 6 horsepower / 12 MPH / gas operated / jet impeller driven, Snorkel exhaust
- RAY an electric model with a 12 volt battery, attaining speeds of 12 to 15 MPH / jet impeller driven

Per Aqua Sport original production and delivery company records - status as of April 16, 1961, there were 660 sold, 420 in production, and 375 (plus 5 to the Navy) delivered (75-RAY, 150-SKATE, 155-DOLPHIN). The final totals for the number of boats ultimately sold and delivered to all customers are unknown.

The gasoline powered boats used Mercury motor, 2-cycle gas-powered engines supplied by Mercury Marine from their Sarasota Florida facilities. The fuel tank has a capacity of 3.5 gallons. The engine was electrically started from a 12-volt battery system. A pull type starter cord was also available. The propeller shaft and underwater exhaust extended one foot below the keel. Aqua Dart was in negotiations with Mercury Marine for additional engines to support its needs in 1966.

The electric powered boats had a rubber toggle on/off button which maintained a constant speed while engaged. They were powered by an electric "trolling" motor supplied by City Engineering Co. of Indianapolis. Powered by one 12 V auto battery which operated for about 2 1/2 hours without recharging.

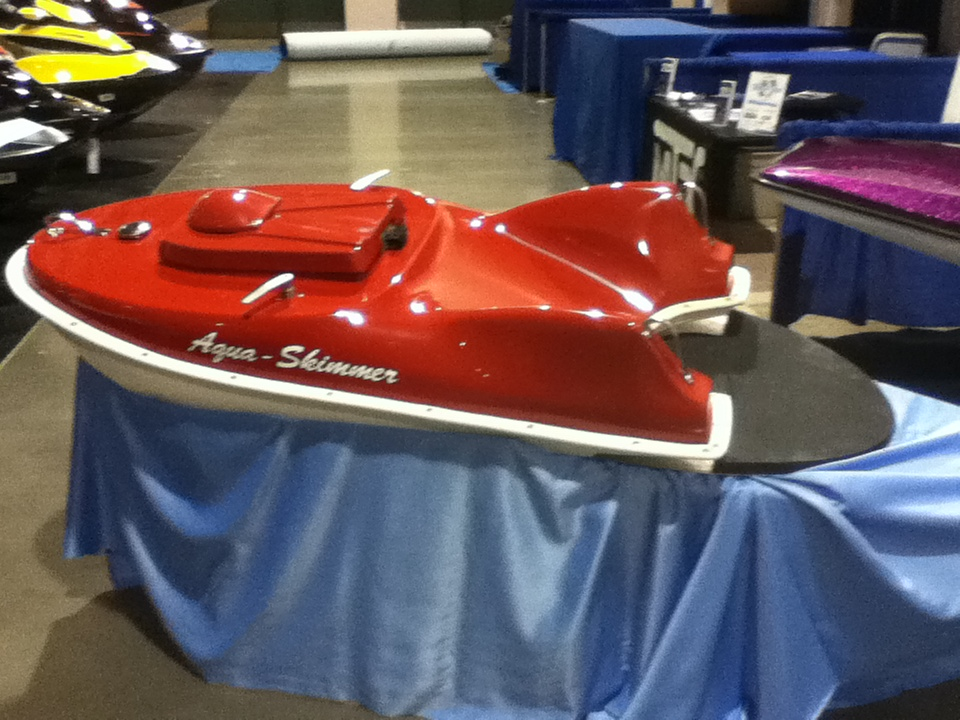
Aqua Skimmer Photo courtesy of Jerry Low(published with permission of the photographer), 2011, Minneapolis Land O Lakes Classic Boat Club

The hull for the Sea/Aqua Skimmer was a molded fiberglass, produced in red, yellow, and aqua. Boats customized for Navy usage were painted flat black with mounting for weapons. The hull was fitted with a foam floatation system to make it unsinkable, and internally compartmentalized for engine housing, fuel tank, and battery mountings. The Aqua Skimmer hull was produced from 1959-1962 in Kansas City Missouri and was an early pioneer in the development of Fiberglass in the boating industry. Hull design for the Aqua Dart was modified and incorporated into the 1963 patent by Aqua Dart, INC.

Two "wet exhaust" ports on the bottom of the boat enabled cooled water to be mixed with the exhaust muffling engine noise. A small side exhaust (snorkel) above the waterline enabled the start of the engine. As the boat moved forward the bottom exhausts would pull the air into the side exhaust (venturi effect).

The Sea Skimmer was operated by laying down on the aft portion of the boat and dragging your feet in the water to steer, shifting body weight by moving legs from side to side and feet as the "rudders" to effect direction. Side mounted throttle handles maintained power to the engine, with the right handle operating the motor speed and the left handle functioning as a "Dead-Man Switch" abruptly stopping all power. Forward motion was halted by pressing downward with legs, bringing the integrated foam rubber covered aquaplaning board to a vertical position (similar to the concept of Aquaplaning (sport)). The boat could be briefly submerged using this technique at full speed. It was extremely responsive to these operational controls.

== Aqua Dart, militarized version of the Sea Skimmer/Aqua Skimmer ==
Aqua Dart Personal Watercraft (on-line auction by "LiveAuctioneers" Title: 1960s AQUA DART PERSONAL WATER CRAFT

On July 18, 1963 (seven months after the delivery of the boats to the Navy) Aqua Dart, INC was established by Rozanski Enterprises, Inc. of Perry New York. Three months later (November 6, 1963) a patent application was submitted for the Aqua Dart. It was not granted until September 6, 1966 (after "Aqua Skimmer INC" was dissolved June 7, 1966)

The Aqua Dart patent was limited to the gas-powered models (not the battery powered models) and mirrored the Aqua Skimmer design and operational concepts and performance. Some noticeable hull changes were made but the overall dimensions and appearance remain similar. Arm support was added to reduce operator fatigue on long missions.

On Jan 25, 1965, Frank Rozanski filed for another patent for the Aqua Dart in Canadian Patent Office (Serial No 921595-Aquatic Device) which was approved Nov 21, 1967.

According to the Democrat and Chronicle of Rochester, NY (September 20, 1966), per Frank Rozanski of Aqua Dart INC, "Aqua Dart delivered three test boats to the Joint Expeditionary Base–Little Creek (formerly Naval Amphibious Base) in Little Creek, Virginia for testing." He said "We painted them a 'sneaky black', the Navy men called it and when we got them there, the Navy people threw a canvas over them before we went inside the gates." The article noted that the firm has been negotiating with the Mercury Outboard Motor Co., whose powerheads are used in the vehicles. It claims artists drawings of the military possibilities for the craft include an air-drop version, another outfitted to carry pencil missiles, and as a device which would be radio-controlled by a frogman who would ride it into target range, bail out, and guide the vehicle in by radio. Rosanski said one Pentagon official In April asked him how much the unit production cost would be. "I told him about $700," Rozanski said, "And he said, 'Oh, then they'll be expendable items.' "

[Declassified July 2022] Two Aqua-Dart watercraft (two Modified Aqua Skimmers) were tested by UDT-22 (Underwater Demolition Team 22) as reported in "CO UDT-22 Ltr Ser 1 of 18 August 1966". UDT-22 sought a Swimmer Delivery Vehicle (SDV) to support their mission requirements. Testing was completed by 31 May 1966. Significant repairs/maintenance were required to complete tests due to age of test boat components. Recommendations were made for modifications for the test boats (watertightness, starter issues, cargo storage) prior to handoff for further evaluation by UDT Seal Team TWO.

[Declassified July 2022] 23 September 1966, Two Aqua-Dart watercraft (same two Modified Aqua Skimmers) were assigned to UDT SEAL Team Two for informal test. Testing conducted between June thru Aug 1966. as reported in Letter Ser-031 dated 23 September 1966. The report noted that the Aqua Dart is detectable on Radar and Sonar. Evaluations concluded there was: 1) utility against unsophisticated detecting targets, 2) as a high-speed safety swimmer vehicle, 3) for night beach reconnaissance. Modification recommended sound suppression enhancements, cargo storage mods, watertightness, and starter control mods.

[Declassified July 2022] One unit was provided to the Marines.

Per the St Louis Post Dispatch, Jan 28, 1970, Aqua Dart Marine Corps Reconnaissance; An Aqua Dart equipped with a silent-running engine, skims the surface of the water in a test of the craft. The 185 pound fiber glass boat can travel at speeds up to 25 knots, with a range of about 60 miles. It is being used by Marine Corps reconnaissance men to survey off-shore waters before amphibious assault. It is powered by a 22-horsepower engine and is steered by the movement of the driver's body.

Aqua Dart watercraft continued to be in use for several years.

== Legacy ==
Sea Skimmers, Aqua Skimmers, and Aqua Darts are occasionally found in the wild, or on display at antique boat shows or available through auctions.
