= FXI =

FXI may refer to:

- Air Iceland (ICAO airline code: FXI), a former Icelandic airline
- Factor XI, an enzyme
- FXI Technologies, a Norwegian electronics manufacturer
- Fuxin railway station (rail station code: FXI), Beijing–Shenyang High-Speed Railway, Jingshen Passenger Railway, China

== See also ==
- FX (disambiguation)
