= Yamaha WaveBlaster =

Personal watercraft produced from 1993 to 1996

- Inception: 1993
- Manufacturer: Yamaha Motor
- Available: No
- Last production year: 1996 (US)-1998 (AUS, SA)

The WaveBlaster is a personal water craft (PWC) made by Yamaha Motor Corporation. Part of their WaveRunner line of watercraft, the Yamaha WaveBlaster 700 (Marine Jet 700TZ) made its debut in 1993. Although technically a runabout style PWC the blaster is more closely related to the SuperJet.

Yamaha's design philosophy for the WaveBlaster was simplicity over comfort. Just handle bars with a trigger throttle and a motorcycle style seat made it a performance craft that let riders enjoy sharply banked turns, tail stands and other acrobatic maneuvers. The performance character and lean in style turning is primarily due to the soft chines but are further enhanced by concave sections near the bow and Strakes along the hull. The claimed top speed was 44-45 mph. With its powerful engine, semi flat-bottomed hull, and chrome-alloy piston rings, this is a model that still has many devoted fans today. The drawbacks to the design is its high center of gravity making it difficult to ride at idle speeds, difficulty at boarding in deep water and somewhat athletic skills required.

== Photos ==
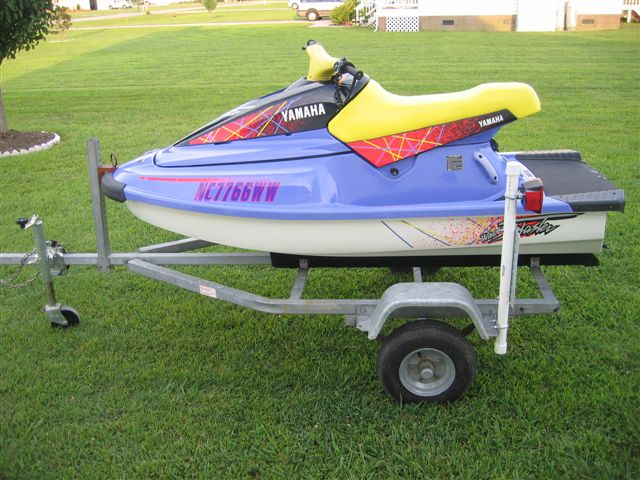
1994 Yamaha WaveBlaster

Surf riding in Virginia Beach, VA

Surf riding in Virginia Beach, VA

Surf riding in Virginia Beach, VA

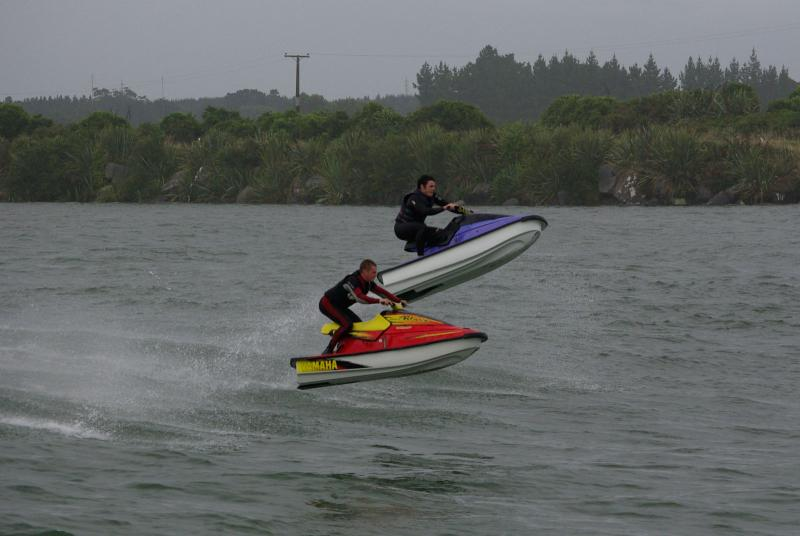
Fresh Water Break in Westport, NZ

== Specifications ==
- Rated power 63 hp (47 kW) @ 6,300 rpm
- Net Weight: 320 lb (150 kg)
- Length:8 ft (2.4 m)
- Beam: 889 mm (35.0 in)
- Engine Type 2-Cylinder, 2-Stroke
- Bore/Stroke 81.0 mm × 68 mm (3.19 in × 2.68 in)
- Displacement 701 cc
- Fuel Regular Unleaded
- Type of Intake Reed Valve
- Type of Scavenging Loop-Charged
- Type of Exhaust Wet
- Mixing Ratio 50:1 (with oil injection pump)
- Cooling Water
- Starting Electric
- Ignition CDI
- Compression Ratio 7.2:1
- Carburetor/Injection (1) Mikuni Super BN 44 (1993–1995), (2) Mikuni Super BN 38 (1996)
- Spark Advance 6°
- Ignition Timing 15° BTDC – 21° BTDC
- Spark Plug BR8HS/B8HS
- Pump 144 mm Axial Flow Single Stage
- Transmission Direct Drive From Engine
- Impeller 3-Blade, Stainless Steel (14/18 pitch)
- Vehicle Capacity 1 Operator and 1 Passenger
- Hull Material FRP (fiberglass reinforced plastic)

== History ==
=== Timeline ===
1987-1991 The precursor to these machines was the Yamaha WaveJammer, produced from 1987-1991. The combination of a fixed steering column and small hull made this a particularly agile model. It shared the same 32 hp 500cc twin cylinder engine and 133mm pump as the 2 seat waverunner of the same era, with a top speed around 25-30 mph. The engine can be swapped for the 50 hp 650cc from later models by using the bed plates and mid shaft from the 650LX .

1993 through 1994 The craft remained unchanged with the 61X cases and blue/purple color paint commonly referred to as "blurple".

1995 Yamaha changed the color to red.

1996 Yamaha added dual 38mm Mikuni carburetors and 62T cases to the WaveBlaster, resulting in slightly more power, from 63 to 73 hp. This model was discontinued in 1996.

1997 through 1998 Yamaha changed the color scheme to blue and white and renamed the machine to WaveBlaster Limited (not available in USA).

1998 This model was discontinued in 1998.

== Summary ==
This ski came from the factory as a stripped down no-frills machine —- it does not have a tachometer, speedometer, GPS, rear view mirrors, cup holder, ice box, luggage compartment or a reverse mechanism that are typical of larger multi-person skis. Yamaha also manufactured a WaveBlaster 2 and a WaveBlaster 3, the latter more commonly known as the WB800 in reference to its 800cc motor.

The WaveBlaster has been described by many as "the closest thing to riding a motorcycle on water".

== See also ==
- Pump-jet
- Yamaha WaveRunner
- Yamaha SuperJet
