= Yamaha SuperJet =

Type of personal watercraft

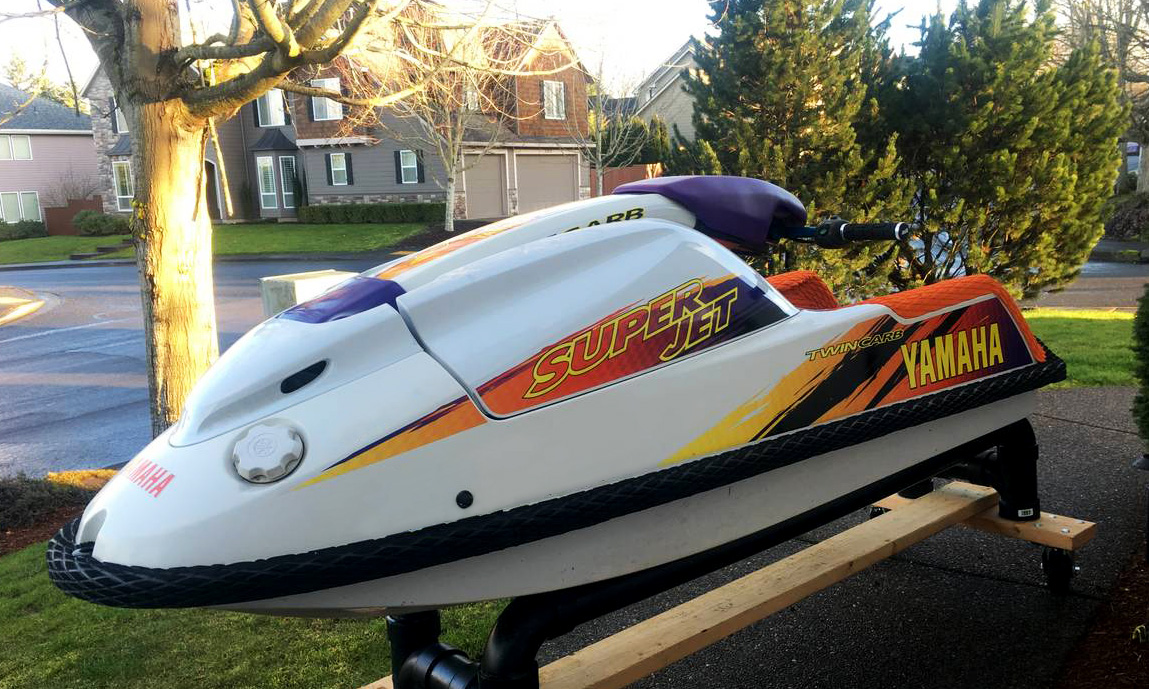
- A 1996 Yamaha SuperJet, the first year of the 701cc straight twin two-stroke engine with twin Mikuni carburetors
- Manufacturer: Yamaha Motor Corporation
- Also called: SuperJet, 701, Square nose (SN), Round nose (RN)
- Production: 1990 - present (2020)
- Assembly: Engine: Kumamoto, Japan; Final assembly: Japan
- Class: Personal watercraft
- Engine: Two stroke: 650cc I2 single carb - 50hp (SJ650D); 701cc I2 single carb - 63hp (SJ700S); 701cc I2 dual carb - 73hp (SJ700AU); Four stroke: 1049cc I3 fuel injected - 100hp (SJ1050W)
- Bore / stroke: 81 mm × 68 mm (3.19 in × 2.68 in) (SJ700AU), 82.0 mm × 66.0 mm (3.23 in × 2.60 in) (SJ1050W)
- Power: 73 hp (54 kW) @6,300 rpm (SJ700AU), 100 hp (75 kW) @7,300 rpm (SJ1050W)
- Dimensions: L: 88.2 in (2,240 mm) (SJ700AU); W: 26.8 in (681 mm); H: 26.0 in (660 mm)
- Weight: 291 lb (132 kg) (SJ700AU), 375 lb (170 kg) (SJ1050W) (dry)
- Fuel capacity: 4.8 U.S. gallons (18 L), including 1.45 U.S. gallons (5.5 L) reserve. (SJ700AU),5.0 U.S. gallons (19 L), including 1.45 U.S. gallons (5.5 L) reserve. (SJ1050W)
- Oil capacity: N/A, 50:1 fuel to oil pre-mix ratio; TC-W3 oil, 3.10 U.S. gallons (11.7 L) (SJ1050W)
- Fuel consumption: 7.7 US gal/h (29 L/h) max (SJ700AU), 8.0 US gal/h (30 L/h) max (SJ1050W)

The SuperJet is a stand-up type personal watercraft (PWC) made by Yamaha Motor Corporation. Part of Yamaha's WaveRunner line of watercraft, it was introduced in 1990 and has become one of the most successful stand-up personal watercraft ever made. All SuperJets, including the engine, are hand-built in Japan. Credit for the design is given to Clayton Jacobson II.

Prior to the introduction of the new Kawasaki SX-R 1500 four stroke on October 6, 2016, it has been the only stand-up sold by a major manufacturer since the Kawasaki SX-R 800 was discontinued in 2011. The SX-R 800 was discontinued primarily due to the fact Kawasaki did not want to go through the hassle of trying to get around EPA regulations by marketing it as "closed course competition use only", instead opting to move on.

There are four engine generations spanning 1990-1993, 1994-1995, 1996-2020, and 2021–present, and four hull generations spanning 1990-1995, 1996-2007, 2008–2020, and 2021–present. 2019 marks the 30th year of production for the SuperJet.

The current model SuperJet is powered by a 1049cc inline three-cylinder, four-stroke engine.

All generations have an upper and lower hull constructed from SMC (sheet molded compound). SMC is a compression moldable composite material made of long strands of glass fibers suspended in a polyester resin.

The Yamaha FX-1 is the only other stand-up personal watercraft produced by Yamaha, and was produced in limited numbers from 1994 to 1995.

On August 12, 2020 Yamaha released the new 2021 SuperJet. This is the first complete redesign from the ground up since the introduction in 1990, and marks 30 years of SuperJet history. The hull is entirely new and it is now powered by Yamaha's 1,049cc three-cylinder four-stroke TR-1 marine engine.

== Model Designations ==
Yamaha numbers its models according to their make (in the case of the SuperJet, all models begin with the letters SJ) followed by the engine size (given in approximate cubic centimeters— the 650cc referred to as 650 and the 701cc referred to as 700) and the year in which the vehicle was made, given as either a one or two letter designation and increasing by one ‘letter' each full year, with an optional letter placed before the year letter as an amendment code.

For example, the letter year designation for the year 1994 for the SuperJet was the letter S, so a SuperJet manufactured in 1994 would have the designation SJ700S. However, Yamaha made engine and chassis changes to the SJ700 for 1996, so appropriately an amendment code was added and a 1996 model has the designation SJ700AU, and in 2002 they increased the amendment by one to ‘roll over’ the letter years so the designation is SJ700BA. The model year 2018 has the designation SJ700BT. There was not a specific amendment code associated with the 2008 hull refresh.

== SuperJet 1990-1993 (SJ650D, P, Q, R)[Generation 1] ==
The 1990 SuperJet was the first year of Yamaha's stand-up PWC offering.

=== Motor ===
- Common name: 650 Square Nose (SN)
- Displacement: 633cc, Inline 2-Cylinder, 2-Stroke (6M6 cylinder, 6M6 cases)
- Rated Power Output: 50 hp (37 kW)
- Fuel type: Regular 86 PON (90 RON) unleaded gasoline
- Premix ratio, gas/oil: 50:1
- Single Carb (Mikuni Super BN44) with twin stainless steel 6-petal reed valves
- RPM Limiter: 6500-6600 rpm

=== Chassis ===
- Length: 86.04 in (2,185 mm)
- Width: 28 in (710 mm)
- Height: 26 in (660 mm)
- Weight, dry: 287 lb (130 kg)
- Max speed: 38.2 mph (61.5 km/h)

== SuperJet 1994-1995 (SJ700S-T)[Generation 1-Upgraded Engine) ==
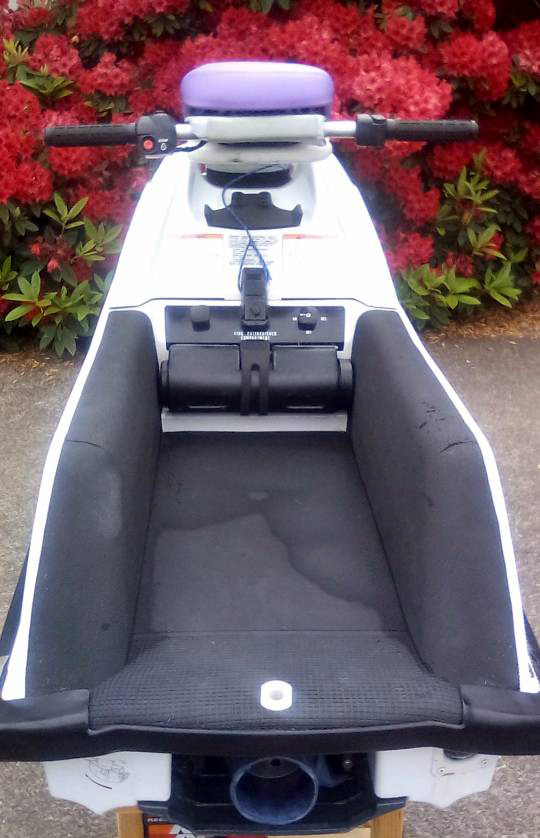
Rear view of a 1995 SuperJet, showing the foot tray, fuel valve, choke, and handlebar controls.

The 1995 SuperJet received an all-new 701cc two-cylinder engine. The body remains the same as the previous generation with a "Square nose" top deck and standard SuperJet bottom deck.

=== Motor ===
- Common name: 701 Square Nose (SN)
- Displacement: 701cc, Inline two-cylinder, two-stroke (61X cylinder, 61X cases)
- Rated Power Output: 63 hp (47 kW)
- Fuel type: Regular 86 PON (90 RON) unleaded gasoline
- Type of Lubrication: Pre-mixed fuel and oil
- Premix ratio, gas/oil: 50:1, Yamalube 2-W or TC-W3 equivalent
- Single Carb (Mikuni Super BN44) with twin stainless steel 6-petal reed valves
- RPM Limiter: 7050-7150 rpm

=== Chassis ===
- Length: 86.04 in (2,185 mm)
- Width: 28 in (710 mm)
- Height: 26 in (660 mm)
- Weight, dry: 291 lb (132 kg)
- Max speed: 42 mph (68 km/h)

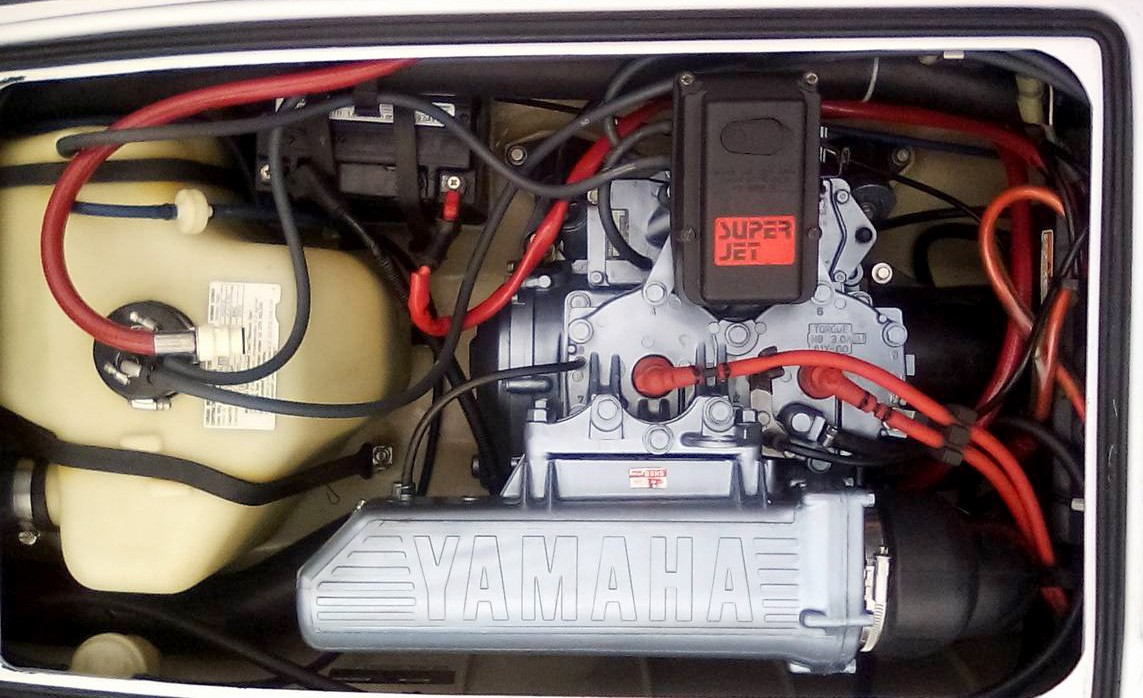
A 1995 SuperJet engine bay showing the 701cc single carb engine. Note the battery is actually installed backwards, largely indicated by the routing of the battery cables that does not look natural.

== SuperJet 1996-2007 (SJ700AU-BF)[Generation 2] ==
2000 SuperJet in Yamaha Factory Blue/White color scheme

The body consists of a new "Round nose" top deck (or hull) and the same standard SuperJet bottom deck as the previous "Square nose" model.

=== Motor ===
- Common name: 701 or Round Nose (RN)
- Displacement: 701cc, Inline 2-Cylinder, 2-Stroke (61X cylinder, 62T cases)
- Bore x stroke: 81.0 mm × 68 mm (3.19 in × 2.68 in)
- Compression ratio: 7.2:1
- Rated Power Output: 73 hp (54 kW) @6,300 rpm
- Dual carb (Mikuni Super BN38) with reed valves
- Fuel type: Regular 86 PON (90 RON) unleaded gasoline
- Type of Lubrication: Pre-mixed fuel and oil
- Premix ratio, gas/oil: 50:1, Yamalube 2-W or TC-W3 equivalent
- Max fuel consumption: 7.7 US gal/h (29 L/h)
- Range at full throttle: 0.6 hrs
- Spark plug: B8HS / BR8HS (NGK 6715)
- Ignition Timing: 15° BTDC - 21° BTDC, variable over the RPM range
- RPM Limiter: 7050-7150 rpm

=== Chassis ===
- Fuel capacity: 4.8 U.S. gallons (18 L; 4.0 imp gal) total, with 1.5 U.S. gallons (5.7 L; 1.2 imp gal) reserve
- Length (in): 88.2 in (2,240 mm)
- Width (in): 26.8 in (680 mm)
- Height (in): 26.0 in (660 mm)
- Weight, dry: 291 lb (132 kg)
- Max speed: 45.4 mph (73.1 km/h)

== SuperJet 2008-2020 (SJ700BG-BV)[Generation 2-Upgraded Hull] ==
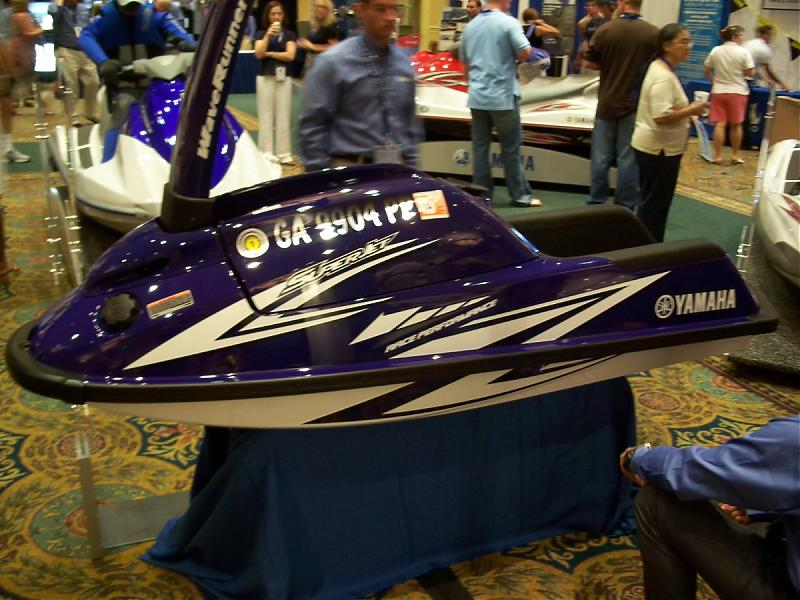
2008 SuperJet showing the Blue with White Graphics color scheme.

The last two-stroke powered SuperJet (produced by Yamaha Motor and hand-built in Japan) has been visually the same since 1996. The 2008 model was the first year of a new bottom deck, changed for the first time in the history of the SuperJet.

This watercraft no longer meets California or New York two-stroke emissions standards as a new vessel (however, previously titled vessels can still be registered in CA).

Purchasing a SuperJet new from a dealer starting in 2011 will usually require a license from IJSBA as they are classified as a "competition use only" watercraft, partly due to stringent EPA regulations for two-stroke engines. An annual membership from IJSBA is $65 for the first year as of May 2018, with renewal at $60 per year, if desired. These memberships can be purchased from the dealer in most cases. 2011 model year Superjet's also began to come with "Closed course competition use only" stickers on both the hood and exhaust.

=== Body Updates ===
The new 2008 has the same Roundnose top deck that was introduced in 1996, with a new bottom deck (or hull) incorporating the first changes since 1990 when the SuperJet was released.

The new bottom hull has incorporated side sponsons (similar to adding "Blowsion tubbies") onto the hull. The rear of the hull is also slightly narrower and has deeper strakes for improved tracking.

The handle pole on the 2008 SuperJet is 50 mm shorter than previous generation Roundnose SuperJets, which moves the rider forward slightly in the tray.

=== Mechanical Updates ===
The intake grate, pump, and ride plate are all set back 50 mm rearward compared to the past year SuperJets.

The engine remains as the same reliable two-cylinder twin carb as the previous 1996+ years, with no noted mechanical changes.

The impeller was updated to a newly designed geometry and made from stainless steel for the first time, in comparison to the previous aluminum design that remained the same throughout 1990-2007. The new impeller design offers large improvements in hookup as well as reduced pump cavitation. The prop driveshaft was changed to a constant diameter over the entire length to increase stiffness, versus previous years in which it is necked down to a smaller diameter in the center section. However, the impeller is backwards compatible with all older models and can be installed on any year SuperJet to replace the original aluminum impeller design.

=== Model Year Cosmetic Updates ===
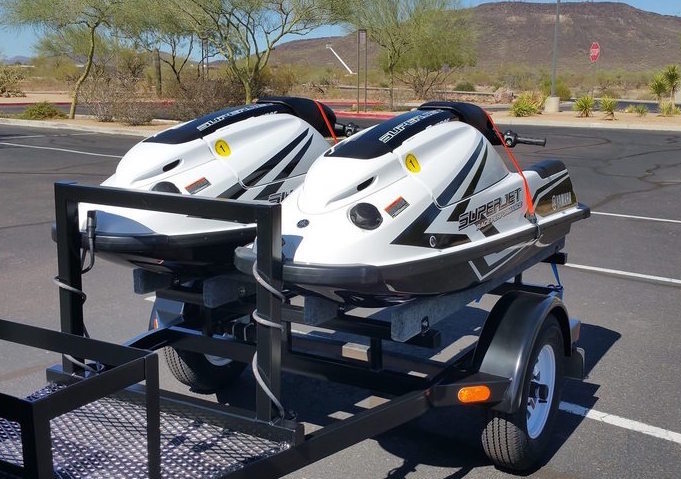
A pair of new 2016 SuperJets in the Pure White with Black color scheme in Arizona.

- 2008 - 2009 SuperJets are blue with white graphics.
- 2010 - 2011 SuperJets are blue with redesigned white graphics.
- 2012 - 2013 SuperJets are a new black color with orange graphics.
- In 2014, the SuperJet is back in black again, this time with blue graphics.
- 2015 SuperJets retain the same black and blue graphics from the previous year.
- For 2016, the SuperJet SJ700BR is available in two new color options: Pure White with Orange & Blue or Pure White with Black. This is the first time the main body color has been white since 1997.
- For 2017, the SuperJet SJ700BS is available in the same 2016 colors: Pure White with Orange & Blue or Pure White with Black.
- For 2018, the SuperJet SJ700BT is available in an all new color: Pure White with Blue & Green stripes.
- For 2019, the SuperJet SJ700BU is available in the same 2018 color: Pure White with Blue & Green stripes.
- For 2020, the SuperJet SJ700BV is available in the same 2018-2019 colors: Pure White with Blue & Green stripes. However, the name was changed to White with Blue. The MSRP also increased for the first time since 2014.

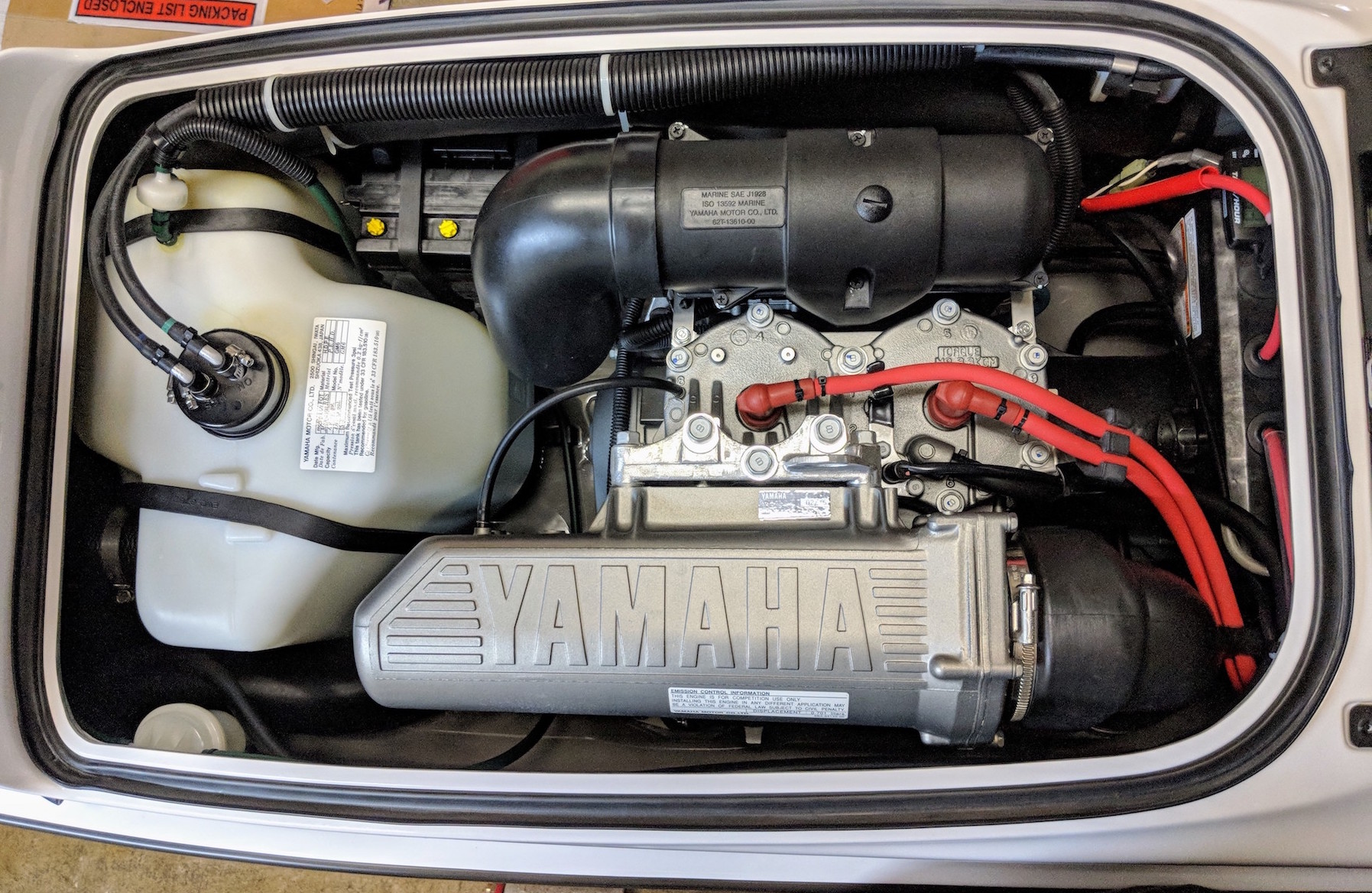
Engine bay housing the 73 hp Yamaha 701cc inline 2-Cylinder, 2-Stroke twin-carb engine in a 2016 SuperJet.

=== Motor ===
- Common name: 701, Round Nose (RN), or 08+ Round Nose (RN)
- Displacement: 701cc, Inline 2-Cylinder, 2-Stroke (61X cylinder, 62T cases)
- Bore x stroke: 81.0 mm × 68 mm (3.19 in × 2.68 in)
- Compression ratio: 7.2:1
- Rated Power Output: 73 hp (54 kW) @6,300 rpm
- Dual carb (Mikuni Super BN38) with reed valves
- Fuel type: Regular 86 PON (90 RON) unleaded gasoline
- Type of Lubrication: Pre-mixed fuel and oil
- Premix ratio, gas/oil: 50:1, Yamalube 2-W or TC-W3 equivalent
- Max fuel consumption: 7.7 US gal/h (29 L/h)
- Range at full throttle: 0.6 hrs
- Spark plug: B7HS/BR7HS (NGK 5110)
- Ignition Timing: 15° BTDC - 21° BTDC, variable over the RPM range
- RPM Limiter: 7050-7150 rpm

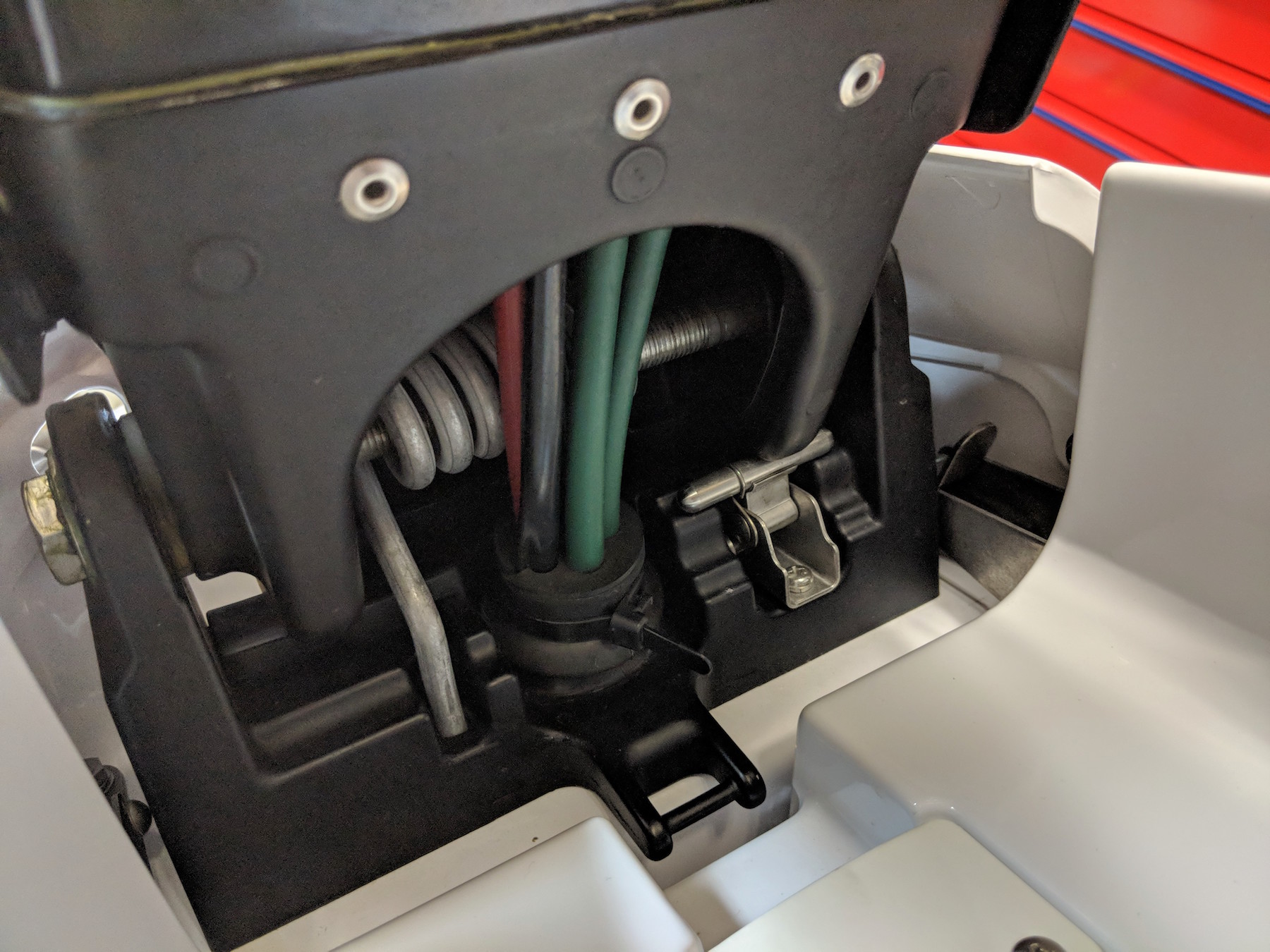
The SuperJet has an integrated lock (right of photo) to hold the handle pole upright, unlike some other skis that have a removable pin that can be misplaced.

=== Chassis ===
- Fuel capacity: 4.8 U.S. gallons (18 L; 4.0 imp gal) total, with 1.5 U.S. gallons (5.7 L; 1.2 imp gal) reserve
- Length (in): 88.2 in (2,240 mm)
- Width (in): 26.8 in (680 mm)
- Height (in): 26.0 in (660 mm)
- Weight, dry: 306 lb (139 kg)
- Max speed: 45.4 mph (73.1 km/h)

=== MSRP ===
- 2016 MSRP: $8,499.00 in the USA, £6,699.00 in the UK, and ¥ 1,009,060 in Japan
- 2017 MSRP: $8,499.00 in the USA
- 2018 MSRP: $8,499.00 in the USA
- 2019 MSRP: $8,499.00 in the USA
- 2020 MSRP: $8,699.00 in the USA
- Sold without warranty and for competition use only as of 2011

== SuperJet 2021-Present (SJ1050W) [Generation 3] ==
The 2021 SuperJet has been completely redesigned from the ground up. Yamaha says "This year marks the return of the Yamaha SuperJet, all-new from the ground up to challenge a new generation of stand-up riders with a torquey four-stroke Yamaha marine engine and nimble performance hull that is 142 pounds lighter and 8.8 inches shorter than its competition."

The largest change is moving from a two-stroke twin-cylinder engine to Yamaha dropping in their three-cylinder four-stroke 1049cc TR-1 marine engine. The hull has also been completely redesigned from the ground up with a new 144mm pump, adjustable steering nozzle, and reboarding grab handle in the tray.

The TR-1 marine engine weighs 160 lbs and is 30"L by 21"W by 19"H inches in size, producing 100 hp. It has an integrated oil tank, ECU and air filter onto the engine.

The launch price is US$9,499 and the ski is still Made in Japan (as all past Super Jets have been).

=== Motor ===
- Displacement: 1049cc, Inline 3-Cylinder, 4-Stroke (6EY cylinder, 6EY cases)
- Bore x Stroke: 82.0 mm × 66.0 mm (3.23 in × 2.60 in)
- Rated Power Output: 100 hp (75 kW) @7,300 rpm
- Carburetion: Fuel injected
- Fuel type: Regular 86 PON (90 RON) unleaded gasoline
- Oil capacity: 3.91 quarts
- Max Fuel Consumption: 8.0 US gal/h (30 L/h)
- RPM Limiter: 8350 rpm

=== Chassis ===
- Length: 95.7 in (2,431 mm)
- Width: 30.0 in (762 mm)
- Height: 31.1 in (790 mm)
- Dry Weight: 375 lb (170 kg)

== MSRP History By Year ==
View source data.

== See also ==
- Pump-jet
- Yamaha FX-1
- Yamaha WaveBlaster
- Jet Ski
