= Clayton Jacobson II =

American inventor (1933–2022)

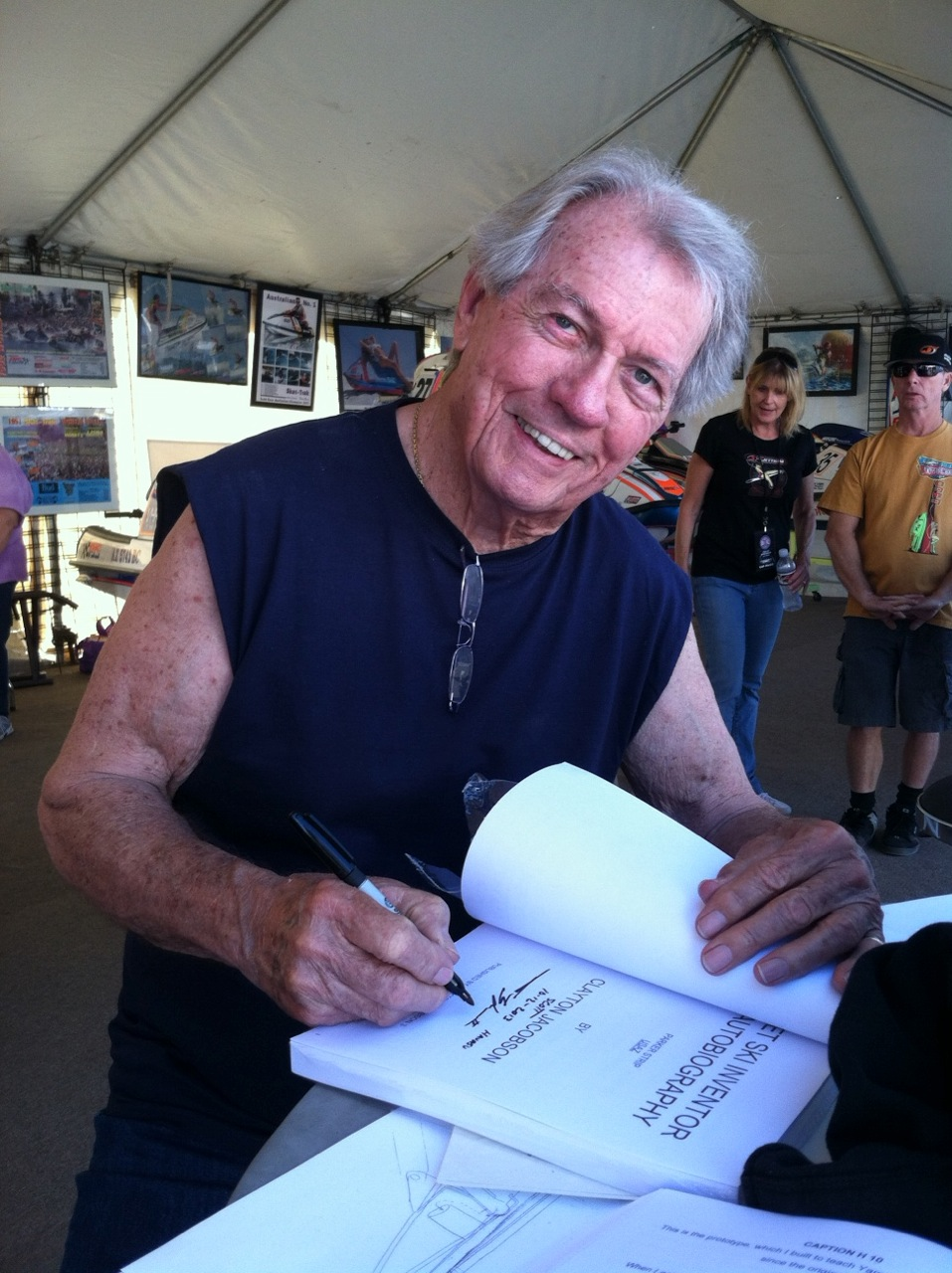
- Born: 1933; Portland, Oregon, U.S.
- Died: August 18, 2022 (aged 88–89); Byron Bay, New South Wales, Australia

Clayton Jacobson II (1933 – August 18, 2022) was an American inventor who was credited with inventing the jet ski. Before the jet ski, he worked in wholesale food where he met his wife Dianna.

== Biography ==
=== Early life ===
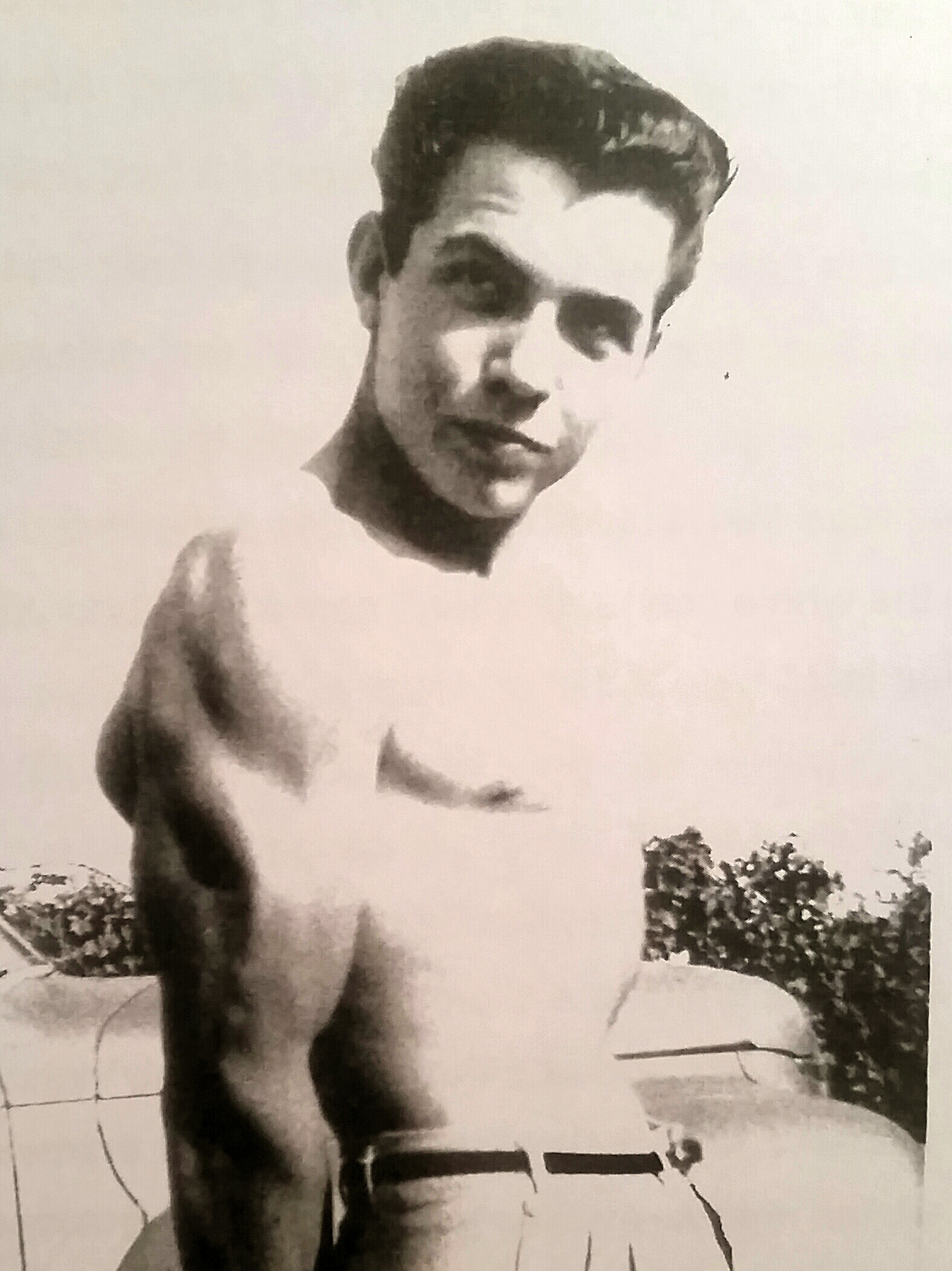
Jacobson as a teenager

Jacobson was born in Multnomah County Hospital, Portland, Oregon, in 1933, to Clayton Jacobson and Sarah Fauntelle Shrock. The Jacobson family had mostly moved to the American West Coast by the early 1930s after having originally immigrated to Northfield, Minnesota, from Norway. By the mid-1940s Jacobson, his parents and his sister, Carmen, had made their way to what they referred to as the promised land, Southern California. Meanwhile, an addition to his studies in physics and engineering while at Manual Arts High School and Los Angeles City College, Jacobson spent much of his time bodybuilding, street racing, and working at an automotive garage.

Having had a strong fascination with airplane seats and flying while growing up, Jacobson joined the Marine Corps Reserve (Air Corps) in an effort to work closely with the jets at Los Alamitos Army Airfield (formerly Los Alamitos Naval Airstation) and to learn drafting and jet engine technology.

=== Before the Jet Ski ===
Jacobson went to work in wholesale food for a short while, and while doing so met his wife, Dianna, with whom he'd have four children: Karen, Margo, Clayton 3 and Tava. Jacobson left the food business to begin working with Diane's father as a banker at his savings and loan. He moved the family to Palos Verdes, California, and became heavily involved in motocross racing.

=== Invention of the Jet Ski ===
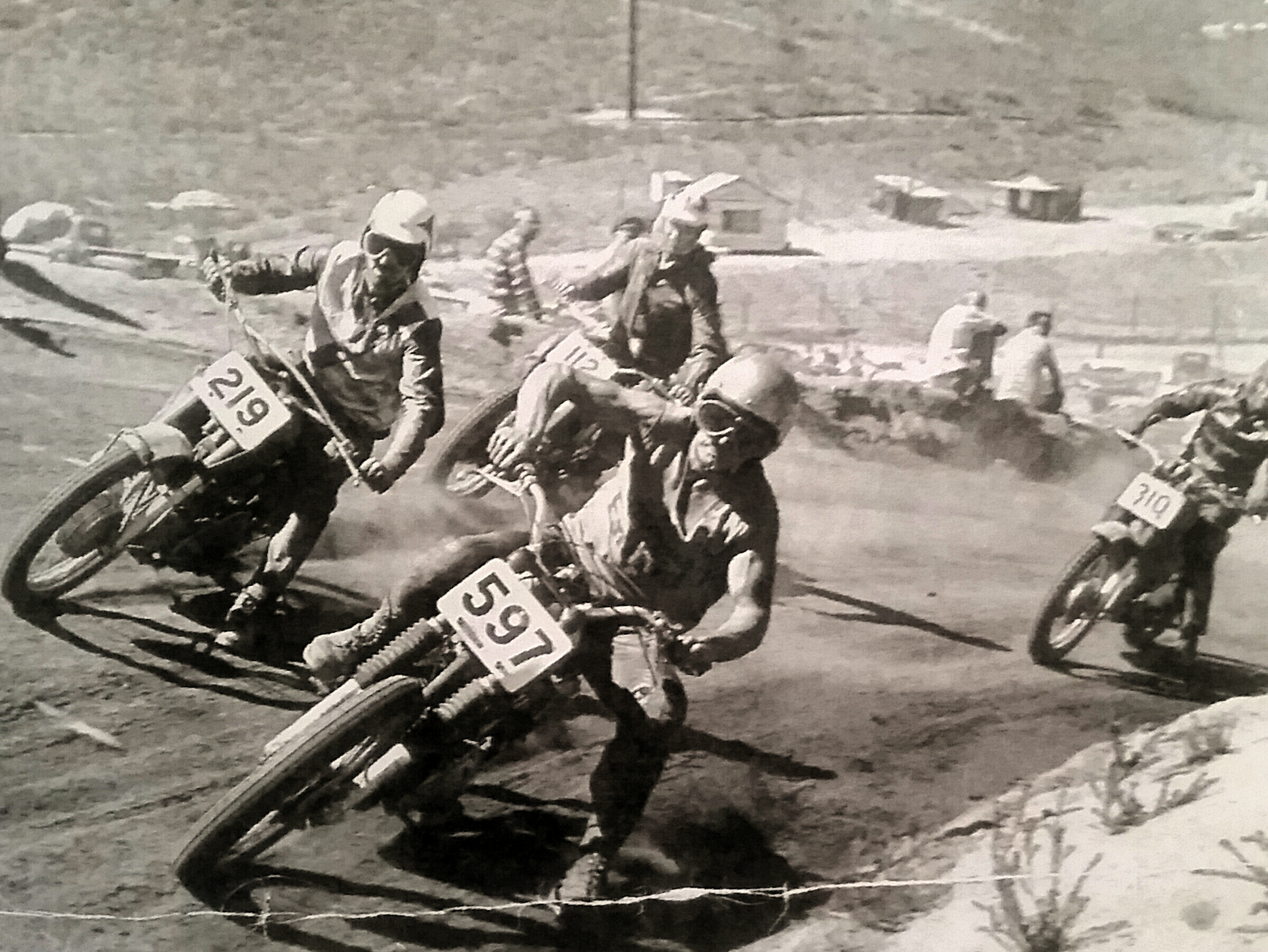
Jacobson racing as #597 on the day that he later remembered as “the day I invented the jet ski.”

During the early 1960s Jacobson had become a very serious motorcycle racer and frequently found himself in the Mojave Desert heat while riding. One somewhat dangerous way to beat the heat and gain some psychological advantage was to ride with no padded leather jumper or sleeves.

One day on the way home after a minor crash on the racetrack, Jacobson found himself taking a break in an irrigation ditch to have a beer with a friend while picking the gravel out of his wounds and lamenting that there had to be a way to enjoy the exhilaration and excitement of a motorcycle without the inherent danger of falling onto hard ground at high speeds.

That night Jacobson sketched his "motorcycle for the water"; which, at the time, looked like a sort of powered water ski.

=== Personal watercraft development ===
- Stand-up:

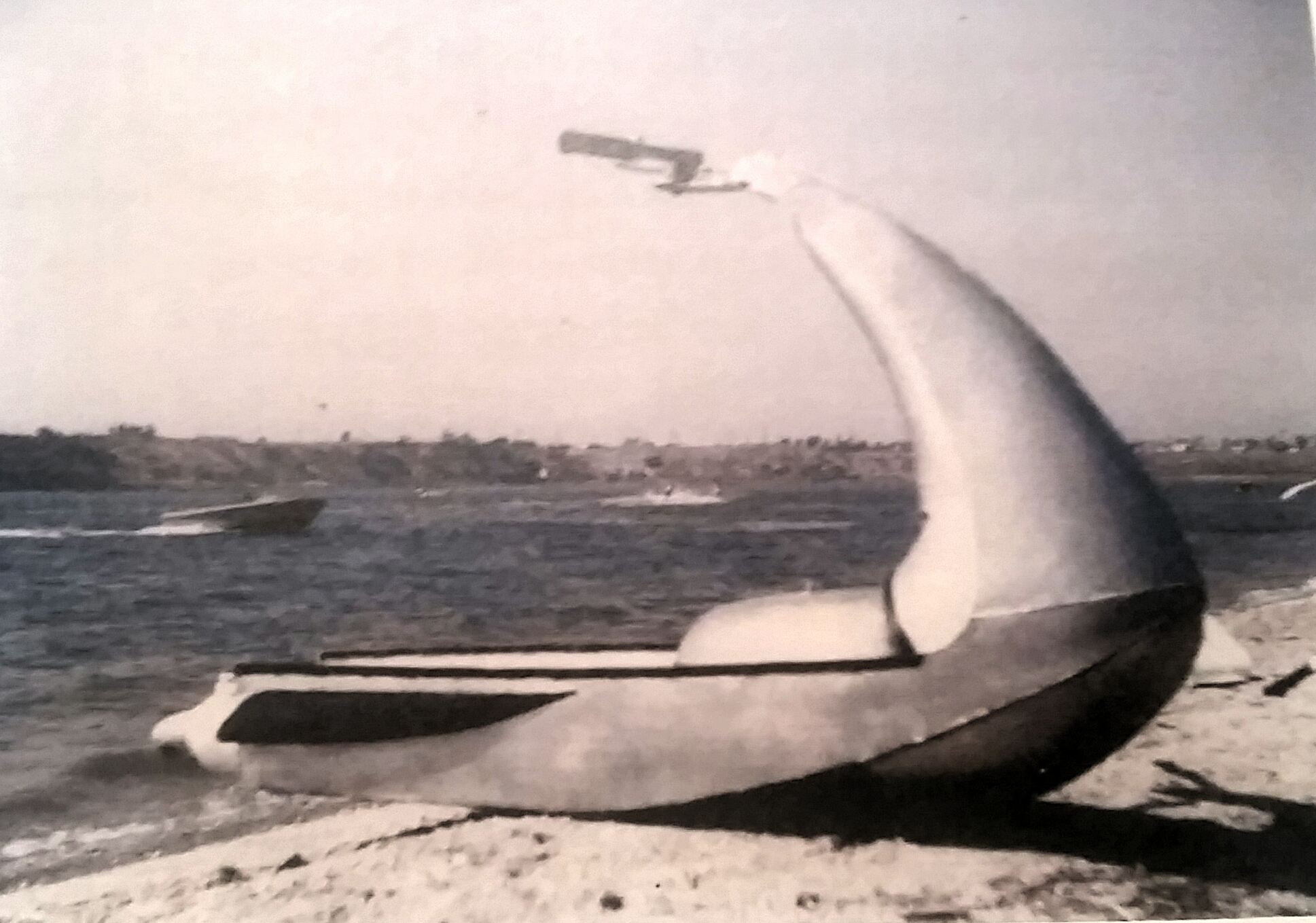
The first prototype

By the mid 1960s Jacobson had quit his work in finance to pursue developing his jet ski concept full-time. The first prototype was up and running by 1965.

This fixed-handlepole, stand-up design was constructed out of aluminum and powered by a West Bend two-stroke engine driving a Berkeley jet pump.

A second prototype, built in 1966, caught the attention of what was, at the time, primarily a snow-mobile manufacturer, Bombardier Recreational Products; and prompted the licensing of Jacobson's patents for the sit-down version of his jet-propelled personal watercraft that would become the Sea-Doo.

In all, Jacobson would eventually build 12 different stand-up prototypes. His development of the stand-up models continued through the late 1960s and early 1970s resulting in additional patents for a pivoting handlepole and a self-righting function.

- Sit-down:

A 320cc Rotax engine was used for development.

The Rotax engine required a larger planing surface and sufficient induction for its air cooling, so Jacobson developed an entirely new sit-down model to adapt.

Jacobson applied for a patent on the sit-down model in February 1968 and received the patent a year later in February 1969.

=== Licensing ===
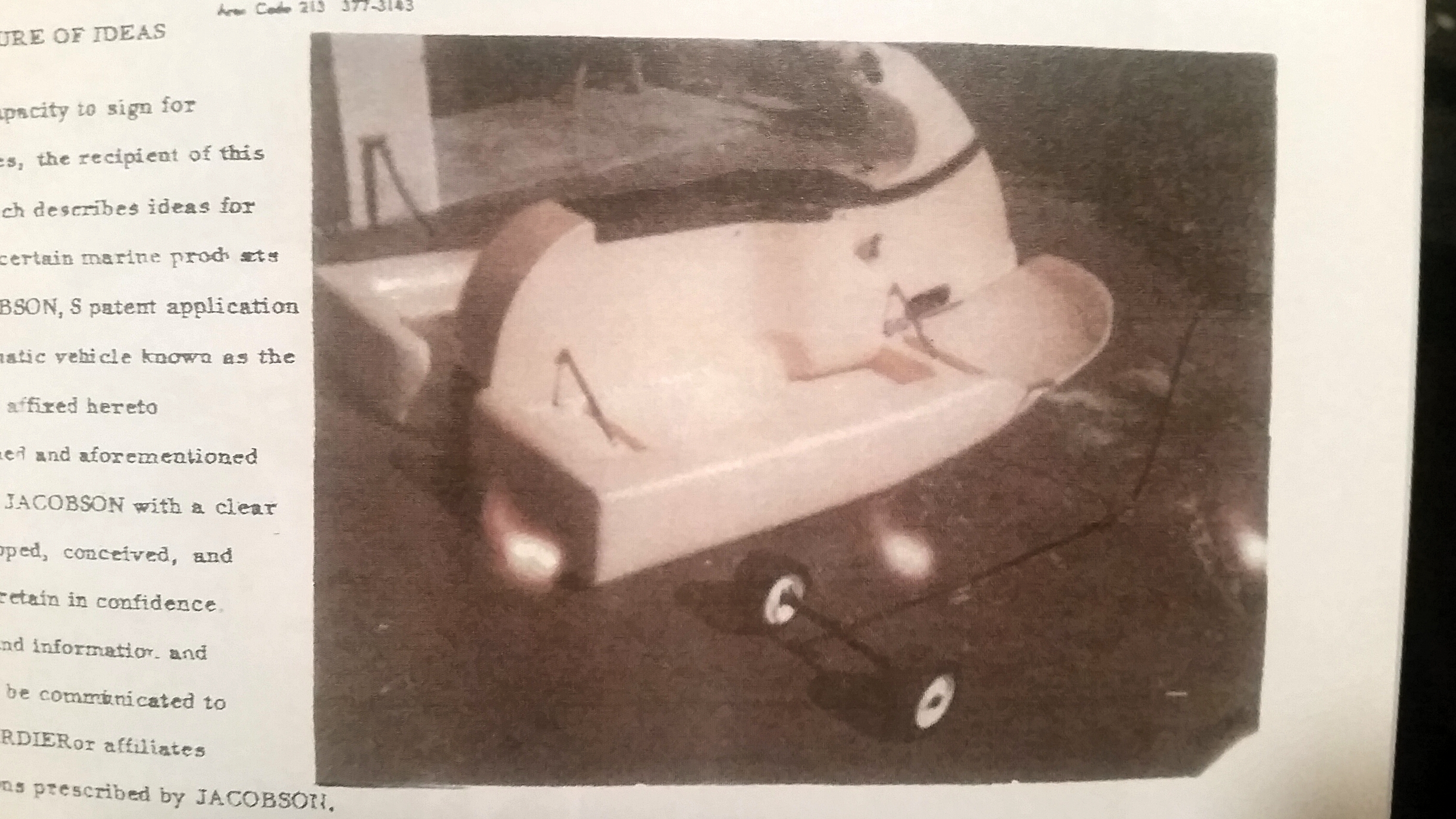
Sit-down prototype

- Bombardier:

Bombardier entered a licensing agreement with Jacobson for his sit-down personal watercraft patents in order to produce their first model of Sea-Doo, which was produced from 1968 to 1970.

- Kawasaki:

Jacobson's agreement with Bombardier prevented him from entering into any other licensing agreement until 1971, at which point he entered into an exclusive agreement to license his patents and development on the stand-up models to Kawasaki.

By this point Jacobson was on his 7th prototype stand-up model.

Kawasaki introduced the first production stand-up Jet Ski in 1973.

In 1976 Kawasaki sent a letter of intent to end their agreement with Jacobson, which resulted in legal dispute and the loss of Kawasaki's licenses' exclusivity.

- Yamaha:

In 1986 Jacobson entered a decade-long contract with Yamaha Motor Company, signing as a consultant to their water vehicle division.

This agreement included royalties on Yamaha's Super Jet.

=== Later life and death ===
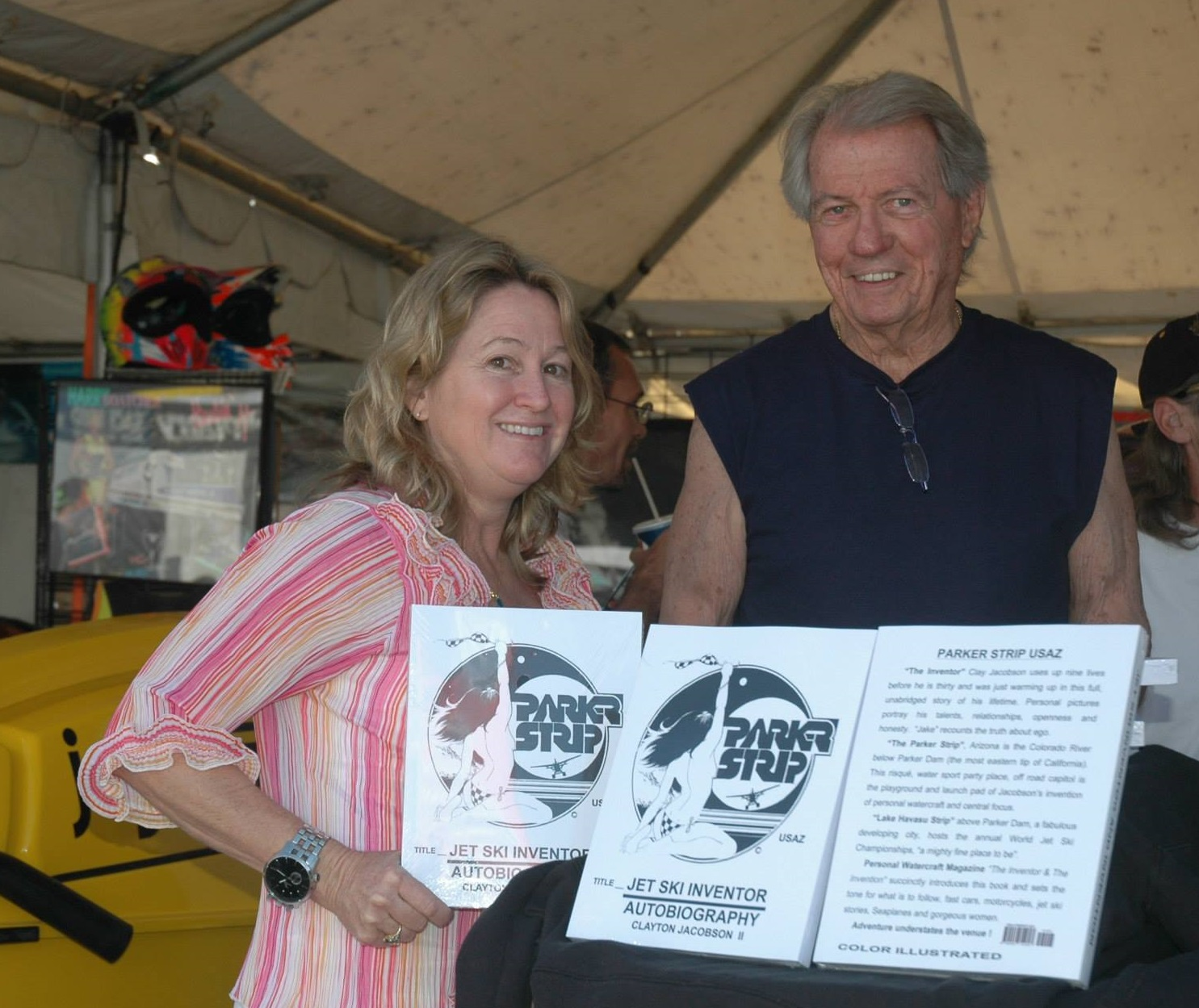
Jacobson with wife Lee Anne at a book signing

Jacobson was noted for his contributions to the work of friend Gerald Wiegert, such as Vector Motors. He also became an avid pilot, having circumnavigated the globe in his Cessna 208 Caravan Amphibian.

In 2013, Jacobson published an autobiography.

Jacobson spent many years living in Parker, Arizona. He died in Byron Bay, New South Wales, on August 18, 2022, at the age of 88 years.
