= HSS 1500 =

Model of Stena high speed catamaran passenger and car ferry

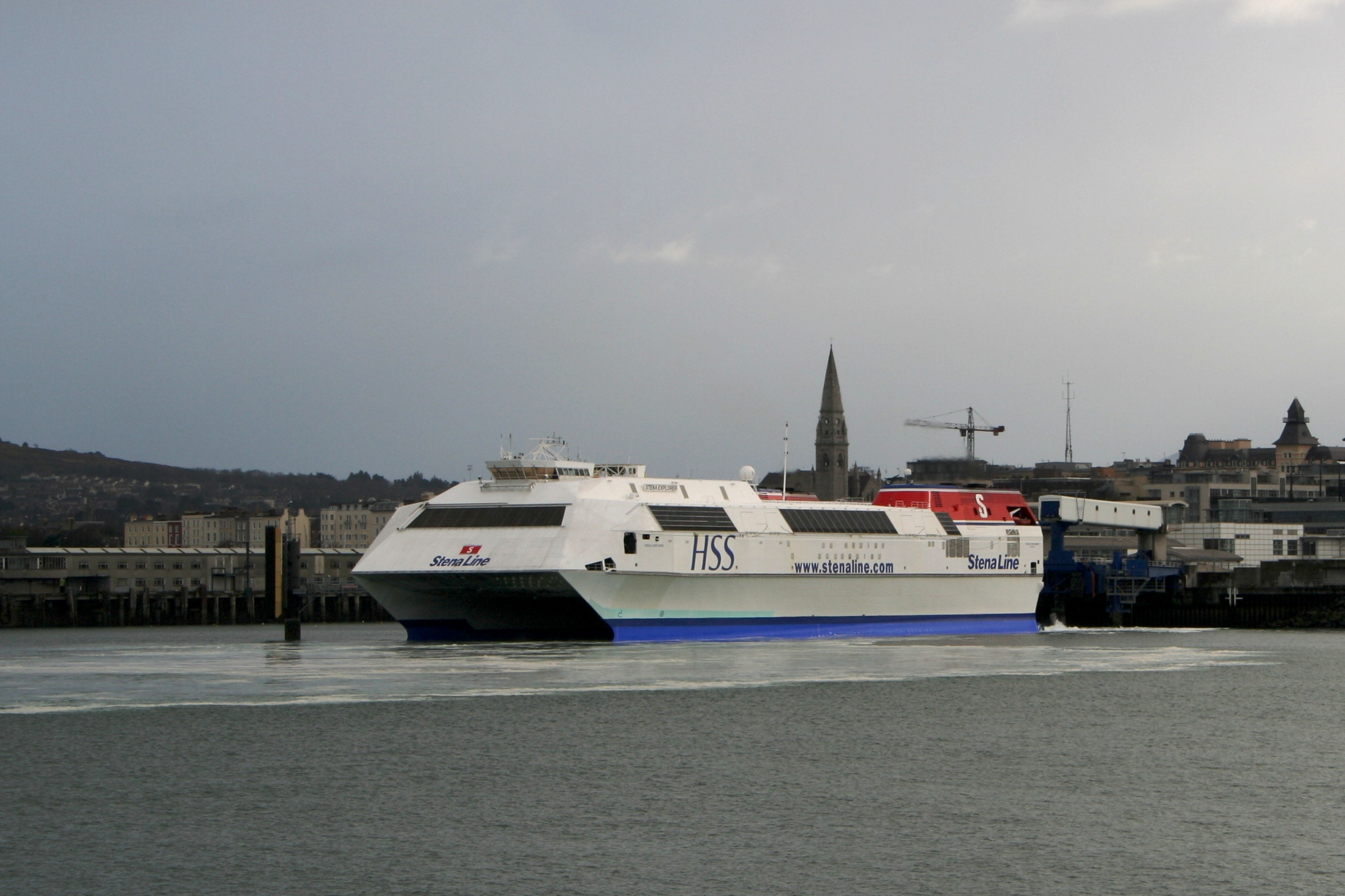
- Stena Explorer at Dún Laoghaire

Class overview
- Name: HSS 1500
- Builders: Finnyards, Finland
- Operators: Stena Line; Albamar Shipping Company
- Built: June 1994 - April 1997
- In service: April 1996 - September 2014
- Planned: 4
- Building: 1996
- Completed: 3
- Canceled: 1
- Laid up: 1
- Retired: 3
- Scrapped: 2

General characteristics
- Type: High-speed catamaran
- Tonnage: 19,638 GT
- Displacement: 90.50
- Length: 126.6 m (415 ft 4 in)
- Beam: 40.0 m (131 ft 3 in)
- Draught: 4.8 m (15 ft 9 in)
- Depth: 100m
- Decks: 7
- Deck clearance: 30 min
- Ramps: 3
- Installed power: COGAG Turbines: 2 × GE LM2500; 2 × GE LM1600
- Propulsion: 4x Kamewa Type S Waterjets
- Speed: Unladen record 51 knots
- Capacity: 1,500 passengers; 375 cars; 800 lane metres
- Notes: The Stena Explorer is mainly laid up, it only sails in Summer now.

HSS 1500 was the name of a model of Stena HSS craft developed and originally operated by Stena Line on European international ferry routes. The vessels were the largest high-speed craft in the world. Several design patents were registered to Stena Line in the development of the HSS.

Three vessels were ultimately completed in 1996 and 1997. The first of the class, Stena Explorer, entered service in April 1996, serving the Holyhead - Dún Laoghaire route from 1996 to 2014. Two others had served Stranraer to Belfast and Harwich to Hook of Holland. On the 200-kilometre Hoek–Harwich route, the Stena HSS had cut the crossing time in half by cruising at 41 knots.

== Design and construction ==
Stena Explorer was constructed by Finnyards in Rauma, Finland.

The HSS 1500 is a semi-small-waterplane-area twin hull (SWATH) catamaran, and was designed with the aim of providing a comfortable and fast service.

Power is provided by four GE Aviation gas turbines in a twin COGAG configuration. The vessels employ four Kamewa waterjets for propulsion.

The HSS class of ferries were designed to allow quick turnarounds at port, in 30 minutes or less. A specially designed linkspan for the Stena HSS provides ropeless mooring and allows quick loading, unloading and servicing. Vehicles are loaded via two of the four stern doors and park in a "U" configuration. When disembarking, vehicles drive straight off via the other two doors.

== Ships ==
- Stena Explorer (now: One World Karadeniz) - Sold for use as office space in Turkey
- Stena Voyager - scrapped in Sweden
- Stena Discovery (later: HSS Discovery) - scrapped in Turkey
