= List of ship launches in 1996 =

The list of ship launches in 1996 includes a chronological list of all ships launched in 1996.

Date	Ship	Class / type	Builder	Location	Country	Notes
6 January	Hopper	Arleigh Burke-class destroyer	Bath Iron Works	Bath, Maine	United States	
8 January	Knock Muir	Suezmax tanker	Harland & Wolff	Belfast	United Kingdom	For Fred Olsen & Co.
20 January	Chakri Naruebet	Aircraft carrier	Bazan	Ferrol	Spain	For Royal Thai Navy
24 February	Pearl Harbor	Harpers Ferry-class dock landing ship	Avondale Shipyard	Avondale, Louisiana	United States	
1 March	Grandeur of the Seas	Vision-class cruise ship	Kvaerner Masa-Yards	Helsinki	Finland	For Royal Caribbean International
2 March	Stena Jutlantica	ferry	Krimpen a/d, Ijssel	Van der Gissen de Noord	Netherlands	For Stena Line|
9 March	Sutherland	Type 23 frigate	Yarrow Shipbuilders	Glasgow	United Kingdom	
9 March	Knud Mærsk	K-class container ship	Odense Staalskibsvaerft	Lindø	Denmark	For Maersk Line
15 March	Bataan	Wasp-class amphibious assault ship	Ingalls Shipbuilding	Pascagoula, Mississippi	United States	
19 March	Alphagas	LNG tanker	Appledore Shipbuilders Ltd.	Appledore	United Kingdom	For Alphagas Partenreederei.
22 March	Ross	Arleigh Burke-class destroyer	Ingalls Shipbuilding	Pascagoula, Mississippi	United States	
9 April	HSC NGV Aliso	high-speed ferry	Chantiers Leroux et Lotz Naval	Saint-Malo	France	For Société Nationale Maritime Corse-Méditerranée
April	Stena Voyager	HSS 1500	Finnyards Rauma	Rauma	Finland	For Stena Line
31 May	Ottawa	Halifax-class frigate	Saint John Shipbuilding	Saint John, New Brunswick	Canada	
May	Pan Chao	Cheng Kung-class frigate	China Shipbuilding	Kaohsiung	Taiwan	
13 June	Knock An	Tanker	Harland & Wolff	Belfast	United Kingdom	For Fred Olsen & Co.
21 June	Kate Mærsk	K-class container ship	Odense Staalskibsvaerft	Lindø	Denmark	For Maersk Line
28 June	Arunta	Anzac-class frigate	Tenix Defence	Williamstown, Victoria	Australia	
29 June	Mahan	Arleigh Burke-class destroyer	Bath Iron Works	Bath, Maine	United States	
29 June	Stena Carisma	HSS 900	Westamarin A/S	Kristiansand	Norway	For Stena Line
2 July	Silvia Ana L		Bazans Fernando Shipyard	Cádiz	Spain	For Los Cipreses S.A
27 July	Louisiana	Ohio-class submarine	Electric Boat	Groton, Connecticut	United States	
1 August	Seillean	SWOPS vessel	Harland & Wolff	Belfast	United Kingdom	For BP.
9 August	Rhapsody of the Seas	Vision-class cruise ship	Chantiers de l'Atlantique	Saint-Nazaire	France	For Royal Caribbean International
24 August	Bridge	Supply-class fast combat support ship	National Steel & Shipbuilding	San Diego, California	United States	
27 August	Chōkai	Kongō-class destroyer	IHI Corporation	Tokyo	Japan	
7 September	Harry S. Truman	Nimitz-class aircraft carrier	Newport News Shipbuilding	Newport News, Virginia	United States	
14 September	Galaxy	Century-class Cruise ship	Meyer Werft	Papenburg	Germany	For Celebrity Cruises
25 September	Evert Prahm	coastal trading vessel	Kötter-Werft	Haren, Germany	Germany	IMO 9138757
4 October	Karen Mærsk	K-class container ship	Odense Staalskibsvaerft	Lindø	Denmark	For Maersk Line
6 October	Costa Olympia	Cruise ship	Bremer Vulkan	Bremen	Germany	For Costa Cruises
13 October	Scott	Scott-class ocean survey vessel	Appledore Shipbuilders Ltd.	Appledore	United Kingdom	For Royal Navy.
15 October	Oyashio	Oyashio-class submarine			Japan	
4 November	Arklow Bridge	Bulk carrier	Appledore Shipbuilders Ltd.	Appledore	United Kingdom	For Devon Line Ltd.
5 November	Panaustral	container ship	Stocznia Szczecinska S.A.	Szczecin	Poland	
8 November	Decatur	Arleigh Burke-class destroyer	Bath Iron Works	Bath, Maine	United States	
13 November	Lehola	Ferry	Astilleros de Huelva		Spain	For Estonian Shipping Co Ltd
21 November	Enchantment of the Seas	Vision-class cruise ship	Kvaerner Masa-Yards	Helsinki	Finland	For Royal Caribbean International
14 December	Stena Discovery	HSS 1500	Finnyards	Rauma	Finland	For Stena Line
14 December	Siroco	Foudre-class landing platform dock	DCN	Brest	France	For French Navy
20 December	Prins Richard	Train Ferry	Ørskov Christensen Staalskibsværft A/S	Frederikshavn	Denmark	For Scandlines
Unknown date	Anne Scan	Cargo ship	Slovenske Lodenice	Komárno	Slovakia	For NORDICA Schiffahrts GmbH & Co. KG MS "Herford"
Unknown date	Georgian	Launch	David Abels Boatbuilders Ltd.	Bristol	United Kingdom	For private owner.
Unknown date	Isambard Brunel	Pilot boat	David Abels Boatbuilders Ltd.	Bristol	United Kingdom	For Bristol Ports Authority.
