= High-speed Sea Service =

European international ferry craft (1996–20150

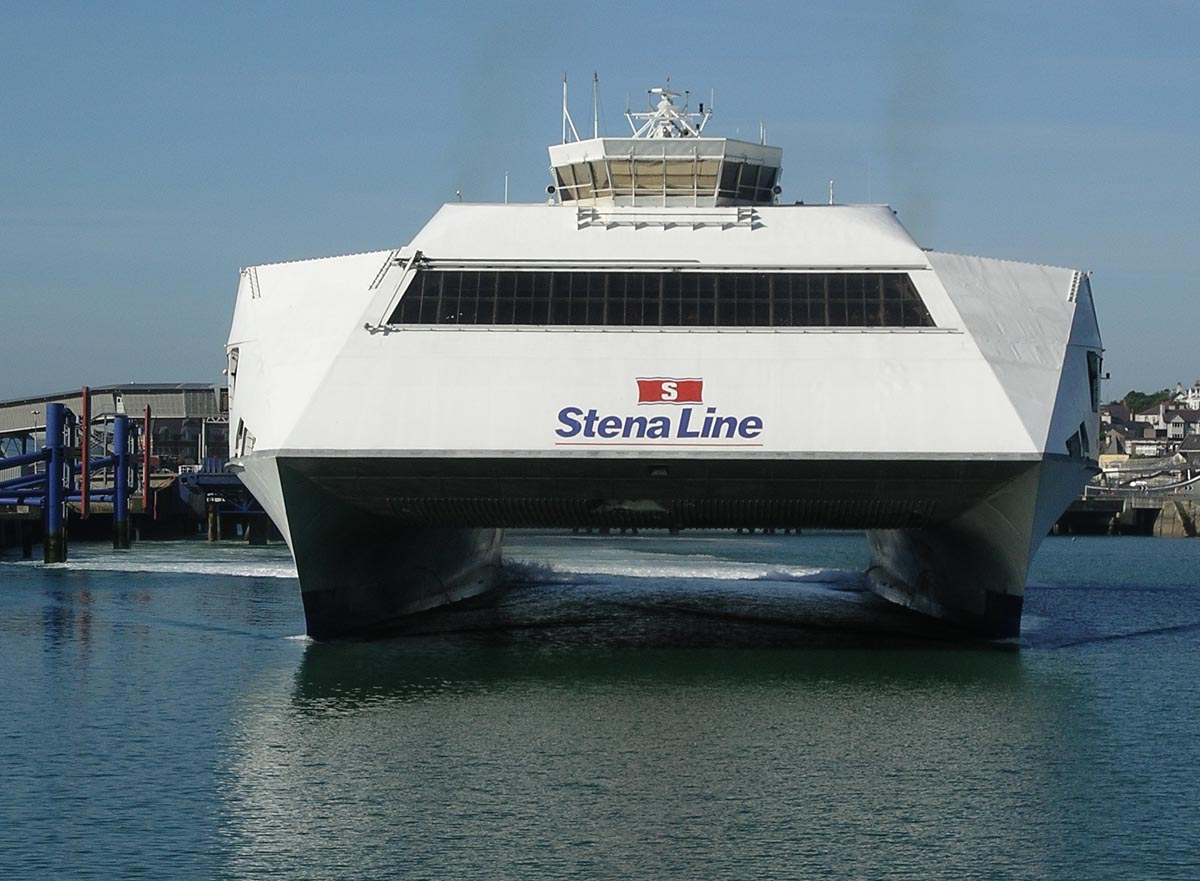
HSS 1500 Stena Explorer leaving Holyhead en route to Dún Laoghaire

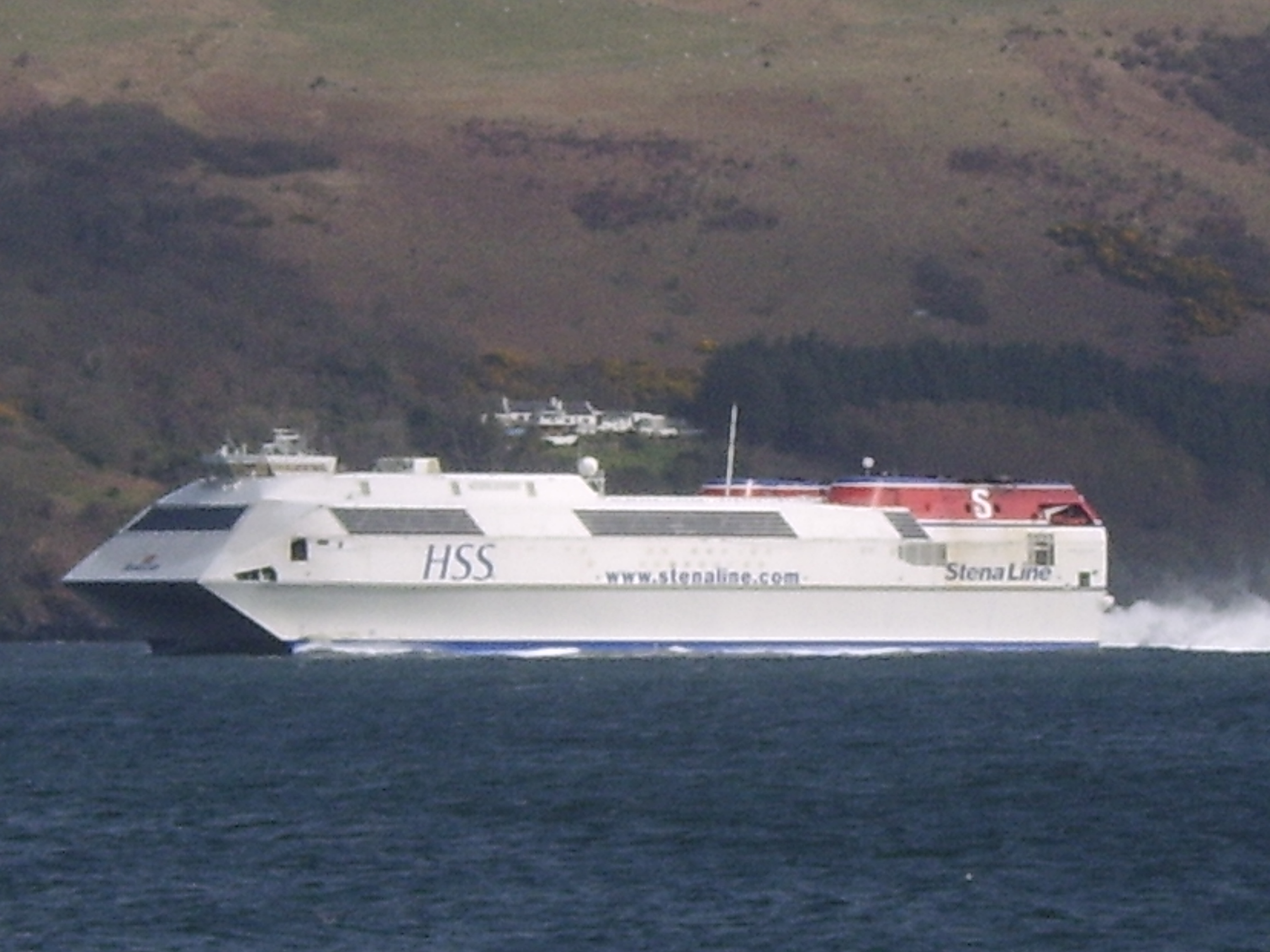
HSS 1500 Stena Voyager leaving Stranraer en route to Belfast

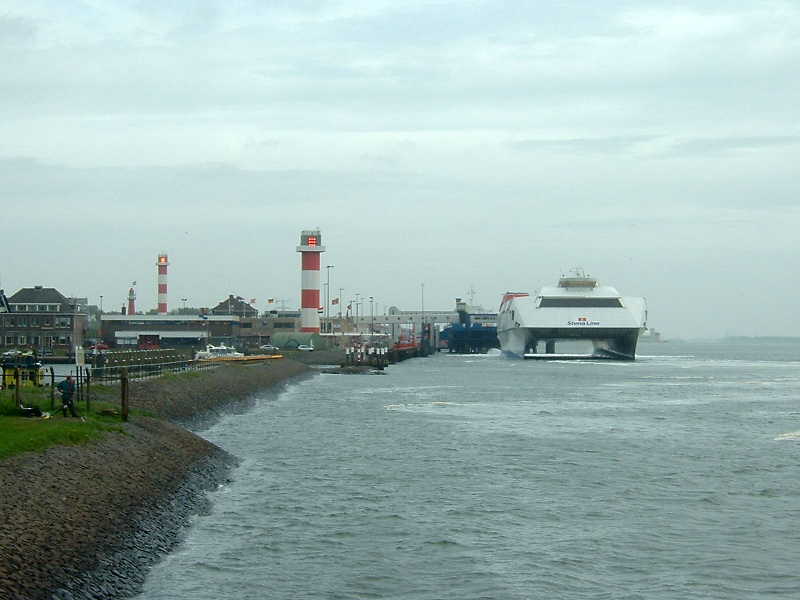
HSS 1500 Stena Discovery leaving Hook of Holland en route to Harwich

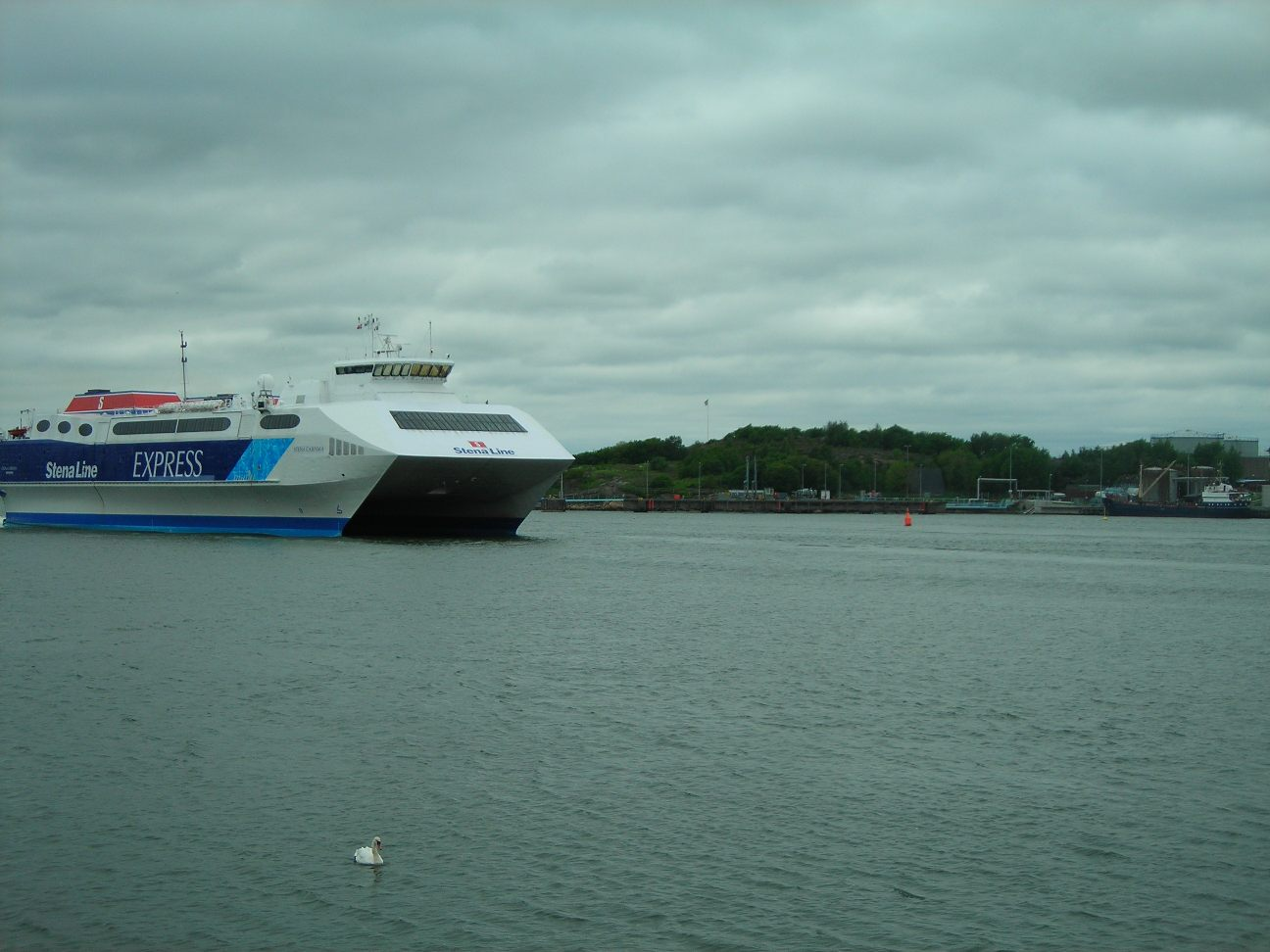
HSS 900 Stena Carisma in Gothenburg

High-speed Sea Service or Stena HSS was a class of high-speed craft developed by and originally operated by Stena Line on European international ferry routes. The HSS 1500 had an in-service speed of 40 knots (75 km/h).

Several patents were registered to Stena Line in the development of the HSS, and four vessels were completed between 1996 and 1997. Stena Explorer, Stena Voyager and Stena Discovery were built to operate on the Irish Sea with Stena Carisma built for Scandinavian use. The newest of the craft was renamed HSS Discovery after being sold to a ferry company in Venezuela during 2009.

Currently, none of the four craft originally commissioned by Stena Line operate. Stena Explorer was the last of the vessels to be retired in 2015 when Stena Line cancelled the fast ferry service between Holyhead, Wales and Dún Laoghaire, Ireland. As of November 2019, one vessel is laid up (Stena Carisma in Gothenburg, Sweden, while in 2013 Stena Voyager (on the Belfast-Stranraer route between 1996 and 2011) was sent to Landskrona, Sweden to be scrapped. In 2016 Stena Explorer was sold and exported to Turkey to be converted into a floating office after spending a period of time laid up in Holyhead.

== HSS 1500 ==
Three larger vessels were purchased, each capable of transporting up to 1,520 passengers at a time:

- Stena Explorer (#404), 1996–04, IMO #9080194
- Stena Voyager (#405), 1996–07, IMO #9080209
- Stena Discovery (#407), 1997–06, IMO #9107590

Capacity	1520 passengers + 375 cars, or 120 cars + 50 freight units (900 lane metres)
Gross tonnage	19,638
Length	126.6 m (411.45 ft)
Beam	40.0 m (130 ft)
Height	27.5 m
Draught	4.8 m (15.6 ft)
Machinery	68 MW (91,000 hp) (twin COGAG configuration of 2 × GE LM2500 + 2 × GE LM1600 gas turbines), 4 × KaMeWa (now Rolls-Royce) type S waterjets for propulsion
Speed	40 knots (service speed), 51 knots (unladen record)
Hull	Aluminium
Generator	3440 kW electrical generation (4 × Cummins KTA38G3(M)/KV12)
Builder	Finnyards, Rauma, Finland, cost £65m

== HSS 900 ==
Two HSS 900 vessels were originally ordered, but following bankruptcy of the shipyard where they were constructed, the second one was scrapped at only 30% complete. This left only one that entered service:

- Stena Carisma (#238), 1997–06–20, IMO #9127760

Capacity	900 passengers + 208 cars, or 151 cars + 10 coaches
Displacement	8,631 tonnes
Length	89.75 m
Beam	30.47 m
Draught	3.9 m draft
Machinery	33,500 kW (45,000 hp) (2 × ABB–STAL GT35) (Siemens SGT 500) Fuel Heavy oil fuel IF-100
Speed	40 knots (service speed),
Generator	2,080 kW electrical generation (4 × MTU 12V 183 TE52)
Builder	Westamarin, Norway

== Routes ==
Until 2011, two identical 1500 passenger versions were in operation on routes across the Irish Sea, whilst a smaller, 900 passenger version operated a route across the Kattegat. In 2011, Stena Voyager was withdrawn from service on the Belfast-Stranraer route to be replaced by two chartered conventional ferries, MS Stena Superfast VII and MS Stena Superfast VIII. In 2015, Stena Explorer ceased to operate service between Dún Laoghaire and Holyhead.

- HSS 1500 Stena Explorer: Holyhead–Dún Laoghaire (Republic of Ireland), operated one round trip each day with a 2-hour crossing time.
- HSS 1500 Stena Voyager: Stranraer–Belfast (Northern Ireland), operated one round trip daily with a second on peak days, 2 hours 10 minutes.
- HSS 900: Stena Carisma: Gothenburg (Sweden)–Frederikshavn (Denmark)

Up until November 2008 and as of August 2014, Stena Explorer had been making two return trips to Dublin per day, at a faster advertised speed of 99 minutes. Up until 2006, this had been three return services per day.

=== Withdrawal of Stena Discovery in 2007 ===
HSS 1500 Stena Discovery sitting just in front of the Dry Dock at Harland and Wolff ship yard in Belfast, April 2007

HSS 1500 Stena Discovery sitting at a mooring at Harland and Wolff shipyard in Belfast, April 2007

HSS 1500 Stena Discovery moored in Belfast, April 2007

Stena Discovery was taken off the Hook of Holland–Harwich route on 8 January 2007, with her final in-service trip being the 10:40 from Harwich, returning to her home port of Hook of Holland.

Taking a route via Dover and the Isle of Wight she arrived in Belfast, Northern Ireland on 24 January 2007, pending use as spare parts or possible sale. Any future use was still undecided, with Pim De Lange, Stena Line's director of North Sea operations saying that Stena Discovery had been returned to the care of Stena Ro/Ro - the Swedish-based organization's chartering arm - but that it was unlikely any other northwest European company would want to operate her.

The HSS service was replaced with twice daily - one day, one night - sailings on a pair of traditional super ferries. The Stena Hollandica and Stena Britannica vessels now accept foot-passengers and were each stretched to 240 metres in length at the Lloyd Werft shipyard in Germany in the spring of 2007. In addition to passenger traffic, the HSS service is believed to have been carrying around 25,000 units of freight per year - about 15% of the 165,000 units that Stena Line transport across the North Sea annually.

The reasons cited for the replacement by conventional ferries were decreasing passenger patronage, coupled with escalating fuel costs. A report in International Freighting Weekly following the withdrawal stated that Stena Discovery operation on the North Sea route was using more fuel than Stena's seven other conventional ferries on the North Sea put together. Fuel costs for the HSS were noted in the article to have risen 40% from 2004–2005 and again by another 15% in 2005-2006, something that was "unsustainable".

In 2009, the Stena Discovery was sold to the new Venezuelan company Albamar (which does business as 'Ferrymar'). Renamed HSS Discovery, the ship was purchased to operate a route between the ports of La Guaira, Estado Vargas and El Guamache, Estado Nueva Esparta (Margarita Island). The operation was more economical as, with Venezuela being an oil-producing country, the original problem of fuel costs ceased to exist. Stena Discovery was managed by Stena Northern Marine Management, who dry docked her in April 2009 for maintenance before sale to the Venezuelan company.

On 29 September 2009 Stena Discovery finally left Belfast. Stopping off at Holyhead in North Wales to use the Stena Explorer's linkspan. This was to bring bunker fuel on board, she then finally left for South America on 1 October 2009.

== Timeline ==
- 1997 On 24 March Stena Explorer made a detour after departing Dún Laoghaire in order to pass close to Baily Lighthouse. Baily was the last staffed lighthouse in Ireland and this day represented hand-over from keepers Eugene O’Sullivan and Anthony Burke to automatic remote operation.
- 1997 Following her introduction that year, Stena Discovery was nicknamed The Wave Machine by locals around Harwich and Felixstowe. Certain critical ranges of speeds caused the HSS ship to produce breaking beach waves of up to 0.5m in height, often sweeping possessions around or knocking over fully-grown adults. Over the following two years, several changes to the HSS' Harwich approach route were undertaken along with strict guidelines to minimise the duration of time spent in the critical speed range between 16 knots-34 knots found to induce significant waves. Signs were erected along affected beach-fronts along with a warning siren on the approach of the HSS.
- 1998 A year after Stena Carisma had been delivered, the presence of corrosion was detected at certain locations on the hull structure where welds joined aluminium alloy sections together. Stena AB were unhappy about this, but gaining compensation proved unsuccessful. In the time since delivery, the shipbuilder had gone bankrupt, the deadline for notifying the alloy supplier had passed and Stena's insurers, The Swedish Club, pointed out that Stena AB's "all risks" insurance excluded "constructional defects and rust/etching". Similar corrosion had been observed on other ships using the same alloy, so the fault was found to be in the choice of material used, rather than a defect of material itself. An adjuster delivered a final ruling in favour of the insurer—corrosion was a "construction defect" and therefore exempt. The Det Norske Veritas safety authority had approved the supplier, but not the alloy in question. DNV subsequently approved the particular aluminium alloy, but only for use in moisture-free areas.
- 2004 On 17 November Stena Carisma undertook a charter with the Swedish Infrastructure Minister, Ulrica Messing, to inaugurate new and upgraded marine fairways leading to Port of Gothenburg.
- Early 2006 Stena Explorer and Stena Carisma received upgrades by fitting them with new Imtech N.V. UniMACS 3000 bridge navigation and control systems. The UniMACS 3000 system includes fifteen computers, five display screens and dual uninterruptible power supplies. Many of the components of the new system were installed in the electrical room below the bridge during a parallel testing, development and verification phase. The remaining two HSS ships were scheduled to receive their systems at the start of 2007.
- 2009 On 6 October when HSC Stena Voyager was featured in filming for the BBC television series Top Gear, a Renault Twingo car was sunk into the wash behind the departing ferry.

=== Incidents ===
- In January 1998, Stena Discovery was travelling at full speed when she hit a 3.5m swell, resulting in water being pushed up over the nose and hitting the bridge windows. The swell ripped through the underside of the nose. It was later discovered the combination of swell and speed was beyond Stena Discovery's design capability. Small air holes were fitted on the underside of the nose to prevent a repeat incident.
- On 23 August 1998, Stena Discovery suffered berthing issues at Harwich on the incoming evening service. Docking should have taken place at 19:00, but passengers were off-loaded at 01:00 and sent to hotels before berthing with the Linkspan finally succeeded at 02:00. The 19:40 return trip to Hook of Holland was cancelled, along with what would have been the 07:20 departure. The 10:40 service from Harwich was also cancelled and Stena Discovery returned to Hook of Holland light.
- On 15 March 2001, the driver of an 18-tonne lorry (loaded with 12 tonnes of fresh fish) failed to put his vehicle's handbrake on during a crossing of the Stena Discovery from Hook of Holland to Harwich. As the ferry sped up, the lorry rolled back, crashed through the Discovery's rear doors, and plunged into the North Sea. It took along with it three smaller Ford Transit vans as well as one of the boat's rear doors. The vessel returned to Hook of Holland and was taken out of service for repairs. Damage to the door and loss of the vehicles was estimated to be in the region of £200,000.
- On 20 September 2001, Stena Explorer suffered a generator fire in one of her pontoons. Whilst reversing to dock at her berth in Holyhead, a fire was detected in her auxiliary engine room in the port pontoon. Shortly after, the CCTV system normally used for visual docking cut-off. Knowing that just-completed checks showed that fire doors (lasting at least one hour) were closed, permission to shut off the engine in question was denied by the Master of the Ship until final approach line up with the Linkspan was confirmed. At this point the failing Cummins generator was shut off. In lieu of the CCTV system, docking distances were relayed to the bridge by portable radio. Berthing was complete within 5 minutes of the original fire alarm and fresh water was taken on board to replenish the Hi-fog fire suppression system whilst all 551 passengers were safely off-loaded. The fire brigade attended and the Hi-fog water mist was deactivated at their request. A nine-month Marine Accident Investigation Branch investigation found the fault to be incorrect fitting of a compression-fitting used for a high-pressure fuel line leading to fuel spraying and igniting upon contact with the hot turbo-charger unit.
- On 20 February 2007, a woman walking on the shore in Holywood, Northern Ireland claimed she and her two young children had almost been swept out to sea by a wave she believed was caused by a passing HSS ferry.
- On 15 October 2007, fire broke out in a sealed turbine unit on board the Stena HSS Voyager en route from Stranraer to Belfast. 555 passengers and 46 crew were issued life jackets on the 0955 BST sailing. The fire was extinguished in less than an hour by an automatic system. Nobody was injured. The service continued to travel to Belfast and later services followed as normal after the vessel was checked by authorities.
- On 28 January 2009, a lorry (carrying ferrous sulphate powder) managed to burst through Voyager's doors shortly after departure. Because of this, the ferry had to return to Stranraer. Subsequent sailings were postponed. The cause of the accident was the driver of the lorry failing to park it in gear and to apply the handbrake. The vehicle was insufficiently secured to the ship's deck.
