= Stena Voyager =

Ferry used from 1996 to 2011

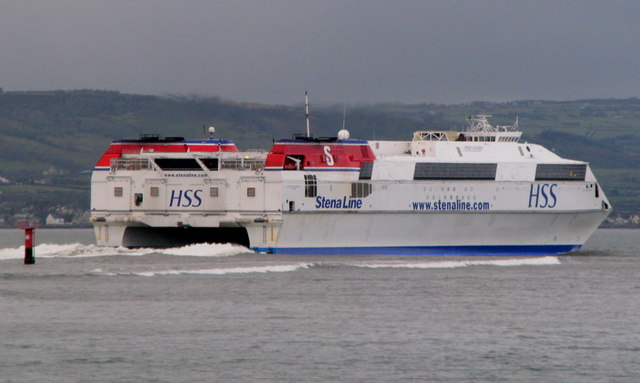
- Stena Voyager departing Belfast

History
- Name: Stena Voyager
- Owner: Stena Recycling
- Operator: N/A
- Port of registry: London
- Route: Belfast–Stranraer (GB)
- Builder: Finnyards, Finland
- Yard number: 405
- Laid down: May 1995
- Launched: 23 February 1996
- Completed: June 1996
- In service: June 1996–2011
- Identification: IMO number: 9080209
- Fate: Scrapped

General characteristics
- Class & type: HSS 1500
- Tonnage: 19,638 GT
- Length: 126.6 m (415 ft 4 in)
- Beam: 40.0 m (131 ft 3 in)
- Draught: 4.8 m (15 ft 9 in)
- Installed power: 2 × General Electric LM2500; 2 × General Electric LM1600
- Propulsion: Combined gas and gas (COGAG); Four Kamewa Type S waterjets
- Capacity: 1,500 passengers; 375 cars; 800 lane metres

Stena Voyager was a high-speed ferry owned by Stena Line which used to operate on their Belfast–Stranraer service. It was the second of three HSS 1500 class of high-speed ferries developed and introduced by Stena Line from 1996 onwards. The others were Stena Explorer and Stena Discovery.

In 2013, Stena Voyager was sold for scrap. It was towed to Landskrona, Sweden, where was broken up by Stena Recycling, another member of Stena Sphere.

== Design ==
The vessel was a catamaran, and was designed with the aim of providing a comfortable and fast service. The sailing time between Belfast and Stranraer was 119 minutes.

Power was provided by four GE Aviation gas turbines in a twin combined gas and gas (COGAG) configuration. The vessel employed four Kamewa waterjets for propulsion.

The HSS class of ferries were designed to allow quick turnarounds at port. A specially designed linkspan provided ropeless mooring and allowed quick loading, unloading and servicing. Vehicles were loaded via two of the four stern doors and parked in a "U" configuration. When disembarking, vehicles drove straight off via the other two doors.

== History ==
=== Construction ===
Stena Voyager was constructed by Finnyards in Rauma, Finland. Construction commenced in May 1995 and was completed in June 1996, before entering service in July 1996.

=== Career ===
Stena Voyager spent the majority of her career sailing on her original route between Belfast and Stranraer, apart from short periods covering for her sister ships.

=== Incidents ===
On 28 January 2009, a lorry carrying ferrous sulphate powder burst through the stern doors of the Stena Voyager shortly after departure. Because of this, the ferry had to return to Stranraer. Subsequent sailings were postponed. The cause of the accident was the driver of the lorry failing to park it in gear and to apply the handbrake. The vehicle was insufficiently secured to the ship's deck.

=== Uncertain future ===
During 2010, Stena Line was beginning the process of transfer operations from Stranraer Port to a new port facility at Cairnryan, five miles further north up Loch Ryan. The new port at Old Light House Point was to be called Loch Ryan Port. Planning application materials submitted in 2008 stated that a pair of new conventional Ropax ferries operating at 21–24 knots (39–44 km/h; 24–28 mph) would take over all operations on the service, replacing the operations of Stena Voyager and the conventional ferry MS Stena Caledonia. The new pair of vessels would provide a passage time of 2 hours between Scotland and Belfast and be fitted out with "passenger facilities similar to an HSS". No HSS-compatible linkspan was planned to be provided at the new port.

In March 2011, Stena Line announced the Stena Voyager and her running partners on the Belfast – Stranraer route (Stena Caledonia and Stena Navigator) were to be replaced in Autumn 2011 by the Stena Superfast VII and Stena Superfast VIII chartered from Estonian ferry operator Tallink. Stena Voyager was widthdrawn from service on 20 November 2011 and was laid up in Belfast until 2013.

=== Scrapping ===
In April 2013, it was reported that Stena Voyager had been sold for scrapping. She was towed to Landskrona, Sweden, where the vessel was broken up by Stena Recycling. Peter West, Project Manager, Industrial Demolition was leading the operation on site.

== In media ==
In 2009, Stena Voyager appeared in the BBC television series Top Gear. Jeremy Clarkson, ostensibly having missed the ferry, tried to leapfrog a Renault Twingo on the departing Stena Voyager. The car sank into the wash behind the departing ferry. Actor Ross Kemp was supposedly locked in the boot of the car that Clarkson was seen driving.

== See also ==
- List of multihulls
