= Zeus (yacht) =

Superyacht

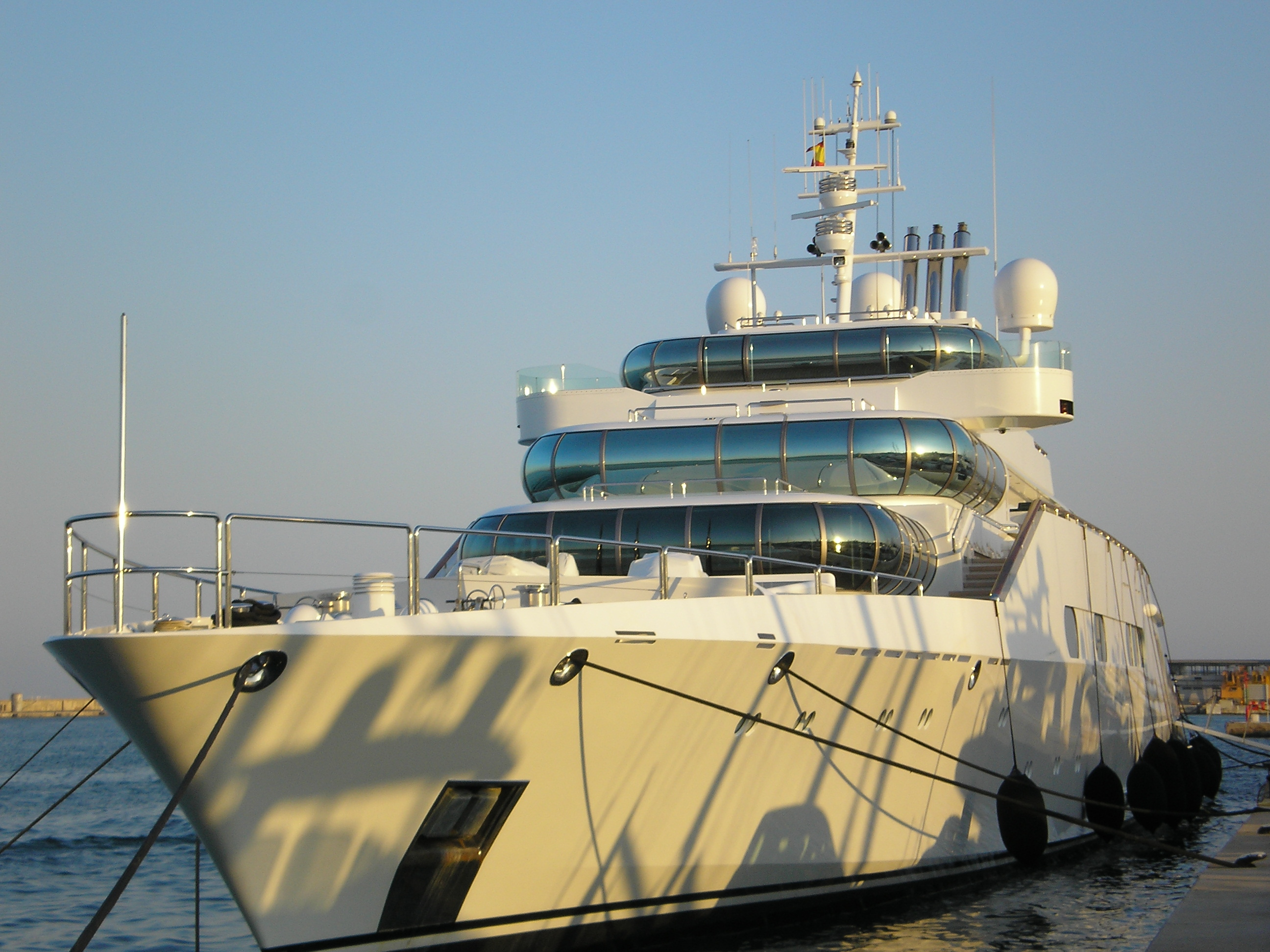
Near-front view of Enigma (Palma de Mallorca, 2006)

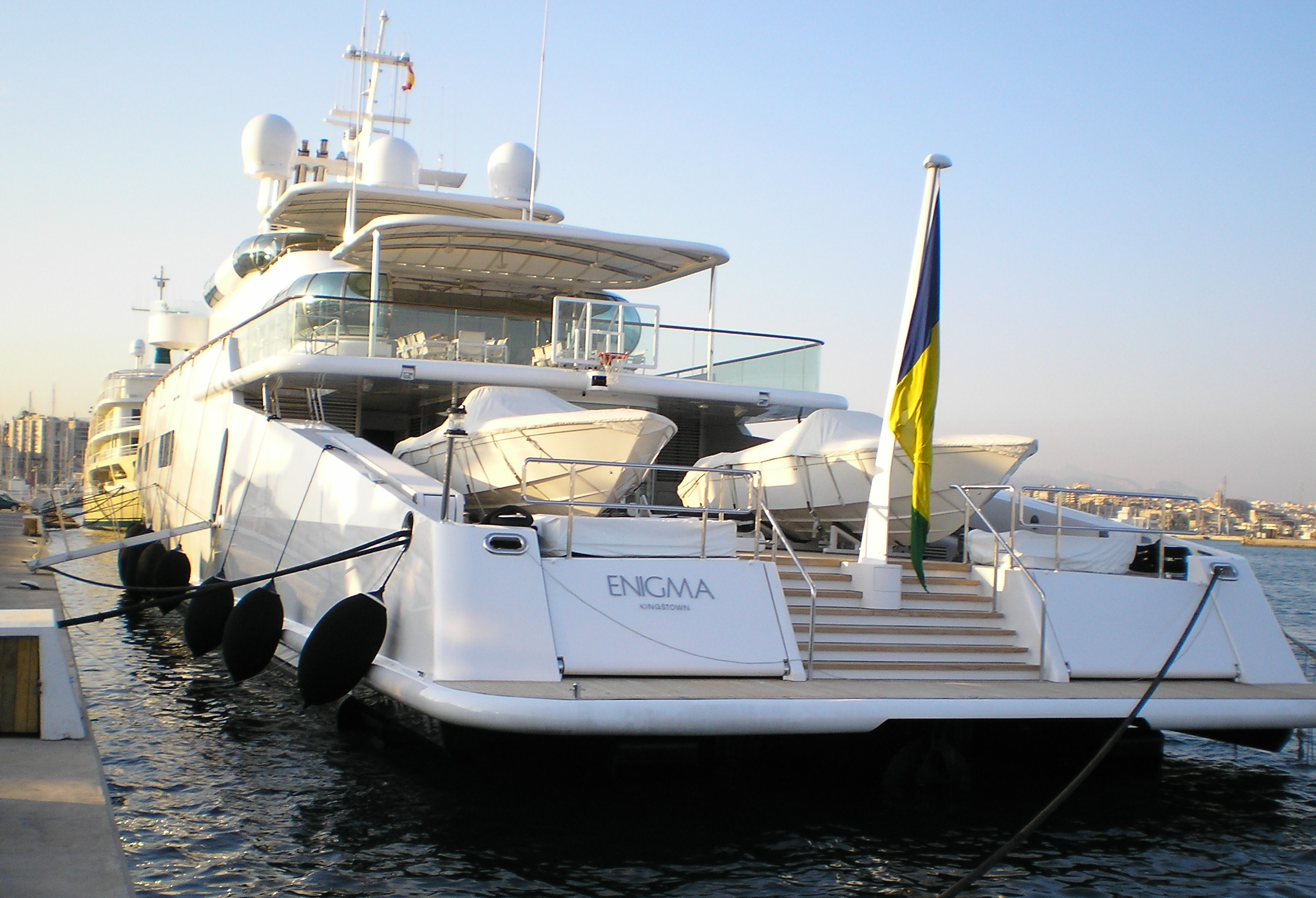
Rear view of Enigma (Palma de Mallorca, 2006)

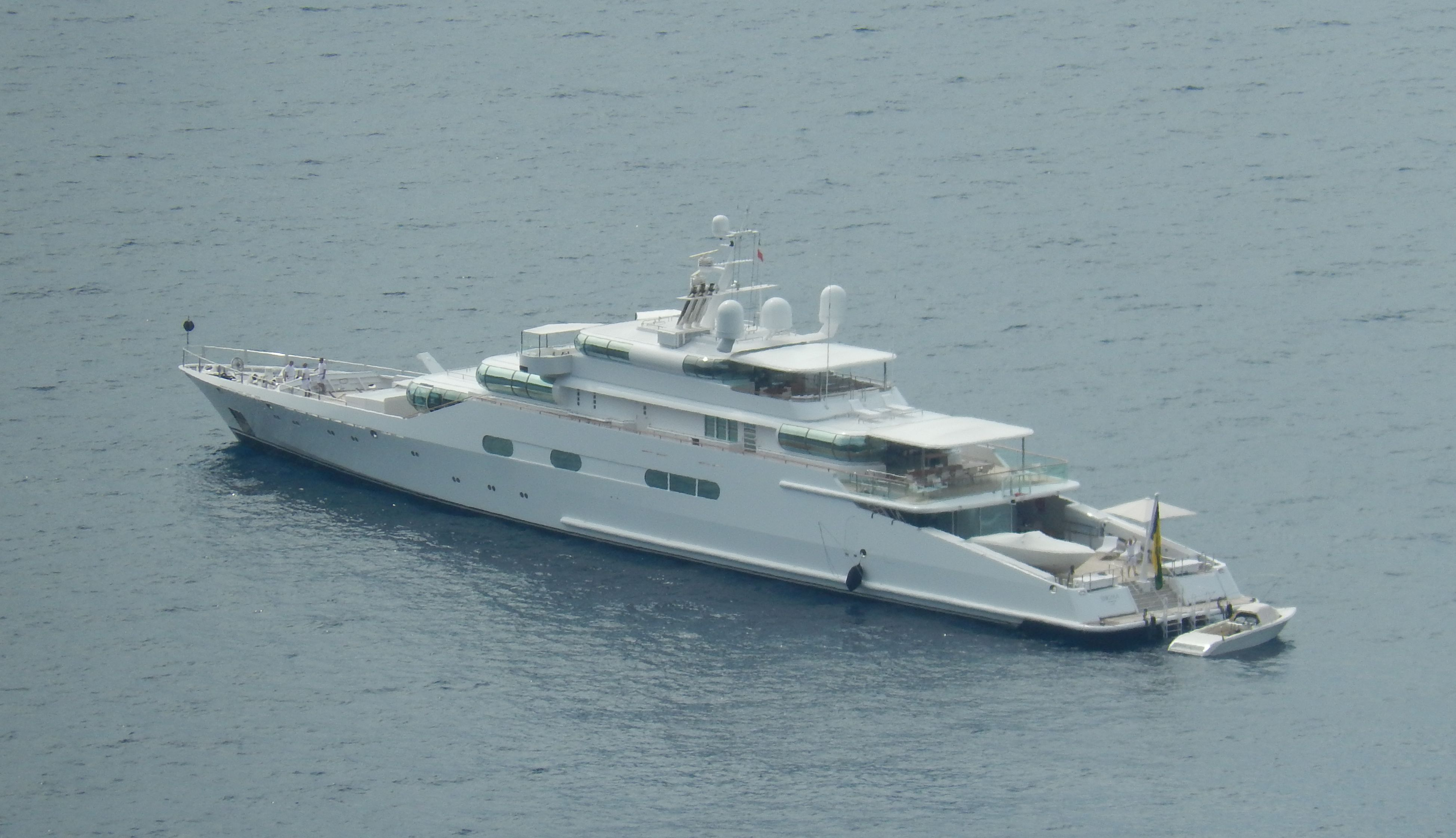
Enigma near Capri, 2016

Zeus (formerly ECO, Katana and Enigma) is a large private superyacht. According to Power and Motoryacht magazine, she was owned by Aidan Barclay, son of the British media tycoon David Barclay, who recently purchased the Telegraph newspaper. She was sold after her former owner, Larry Ellison, took delivery of Rising Sun, the 6th largest private yacht in the world at the time. Measuring slightly more than 244 feet (or around 75 metres) long, Enigma was launched in 1991 and originally christened ECO by its former owner, Mexican mogul Emilio Azcárraga, founder and former CEO of TV and media conglomerate Televisa. Enigma is renowned for her design, including a pyramidal superstructure surrounded by convex windows and an agile design that enables her to achieve a maximum speed of 36 knots. The yacht has nine luxurious suites and the rear deck was originally designed to carry a Maule turboprop floatplane.

She was built by German shipbuilder Blohm & Voss and designed by Martin Francis. The stern originally featured a pad for a flying boat, which Ellison replaced by a basketball court. The boat once crossed the Atlantic Ocean (3000 miles) in 3 days, with one mid-ocean refueling.

Zeus is powered by two Deutz AG BV16M628 diesel engines each producing 5,000 horsepower and one GE LM1600 gas turbine producing 18,500 horsepower. Each engine drives its own water jet drive. Because of the number of fuel consumed when using the turbine engine for full speed cruising, the owner also commissioned a fuel tanker to provide refueling capabilities mid-journey.

In 2017, she was sold to Yannakis Theophani "John" Christodoulou, a Monaco-based Cypriot billionaire property developer, owner of Yianis Group who gave her its new name.

== Sources ==
- Pickthall, Barry (June 2005). "Ellison: men keep building in the race to have". Yachting.
