= Internal drive propulsion =

Form of marine propulsion

Internal drive propulsion or water-jet propulsion is a form of marine propulsion used in recreational boating. Like other forms of motorized boating, internal drive propulsion employs a motor that turns a propeller to move the boat forward. The primary difference between internal drive boats and external drive boats is that the propeller is enclosed inside the hull of an internal drive boat whereas the propeller is exposed outside the hull of a stern drive, V-drive or straight shaft drive boat.

A conventional screw propeller accelerates a large volume of water by a small amount, similar to the way an airplane propeller accelerates a large volume of air by a small amount. An aircraft's jet engine, by contrast, accelerates a smaller volume of air by a large amount. Both methods yield thrust due to Newton's third law — every force gives rise to an equal and opposite force.

In an internal drive boat, pumping a small volume of water and accelerating it by a large amount delivers the thrust. The acceleration of the water is achieved by using multiple impeller stages. Steering is accomplished by nozzles or small vanes that direct the water jet. Efficiency of the drive is related to the difference in speed of the vessel and the accelerated water producing the thrust. Jet drives are inefficient in low speed vessels, but may have other advantages that make them suitable for a given application.

Internal drive propulsion was originally designed by Sir William Hamilton (who invented the waterjet in 1954) for operation in the fast-flowing and shallow rivers of New Zealand, specifically to overcome the problem of propellers striking rocks in such waters.

Primary benefits:

- Water skiers, wakeboarders, swimmers, divers, etc. are not exposed to external propellers.
- Less potential for damage to internal drive boats from floating debris.
- Less potential for major drive damage from running aground as with exposed propellers.
- Better maneuverability and acceleration compared to stern-drive counterparts.

Disadvantages are usually low efficiency and high cost.

== See also ==
- Pump-jet – Marine propulsion system
- Personal watercraft – Recreational watercraft that uses an inboard engine powering a pump-jet with an impeller
- Wetbike – Brand of personal watercraft
- Kitchen rudder – Type of directional propulsion system for vessels
- Water rocket – Type of model rocket using water as its reaction mass
- Chain boat - Water turbines – Type of river craft
