= One World Karadeniz =

Ferry used from 1995 to 2014

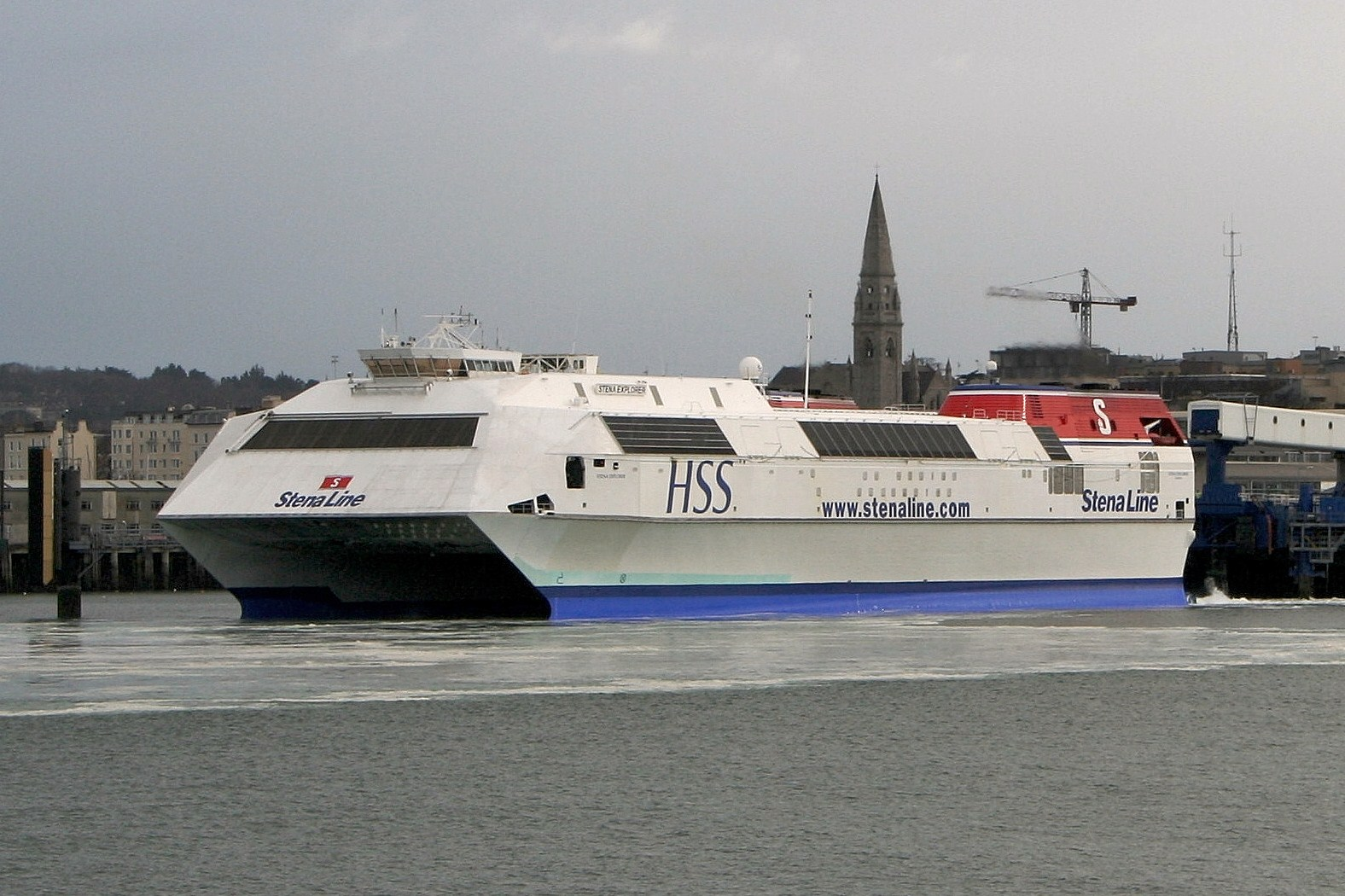
- Stena Explorer berthing in Dún Laoghaire

History
- Name: One World Karadeniz (2015–present); Stena Explorer (1996–2015)
- Owner: Karadeniz Holding (2015–present); Stena Line (1996–2015)
- Port of registry: (2015–present) Monrovia Liberia; (1996–2015) London, United Kingdom
- Builder: Finnyards, Finland
- Cost: £65,000,000
- Yard number: 404
- Laid down: June 1994
- Launched: May 1995
- Completed: February 1996
- In service: April 1996 – September 2014
- Identification: IMO number: 9080194
- Status: Sold to firm in Turkey for static use as offices, power generator and research projects. Moored, at Yalova, Turkey.

General characteristics
- Class & type: HSS 1500
- Developed by: Stena Rederi AB
- Tonnage: 19,638 GT
- Length: 126.6 m (415 ft 4 in)
- Beam: 40.0 m (131 ft 3 in)
- Draught: 4.8 m (15 ft 9 in)
- Installed power: COGAG turbines: 2 × General Electric LM2500; 2 × General Electric LM1600
- Propulsion: 4 × KaMeWa Type S waterjets
- Speed: 40 knots (74 km/h; 46 mph)
- Capacity: 1,500 passengers; 375 cars; 800 lane metres

One World Karadeniz (previously Stena Explorer) is a former high-speed ferry that operated on Stena Line's Holyhead to Dún Laoghaire service between Great Britain and Ireland until 2014. It is a member of the HSS 1500 class of high-speed ferries introduced and developed by Stena Line from 1996 onwards. The HSS 1500-class vessels became the largest catamarans in service in the world.

In 2015 the ferry was owned by Karadeniz Holding to be used as a floating office, research space and alternative power generator in Karmarine shipyard in Yalova near Istanbul, Turkey, as part of the Powerships project from the company that owned the vessel. However, in 2016 the vessel was on sale for as low as $6.5 million.

== Design and construction ==
Stena Explorer was constructed by Finnyards in Rauma, Finland, at a cost £65 million. Construction commenced in June 1994 and was completed in February 1996, before entering service in April 1996.

The vessel is a catamaran, and was designed with the aim of providing a comfortable and fast service. The sailing time between Holyhead and Dún Laoghaire was 99 minutes.

Power is provided by four GE Aviation gas turbines in a twin combined gas and gas (COGAG) configuration. The vessel employs four KaMeWa waterjets for propulsion.

The HSS class of ferries were designed to allow quick turnarounds at port. A specially designed linkspan provides ropeless mooring and allows quick loading, unloading and servicing. Vehicles are loaded via two of the four stern doors and park in a "U" configuration. When disembarking, vehicles drive straight off via the other two doors.

== Career ==
Stena Explorer had spent the majority of her career sailing on her original route between Holyhead and Dún Laoghaire.

Due to increasing world price of oil the Stena HSS had her crossing time extended to around 119 minutes in a bid to trim her fuel bill. Over the years, the Stena HSS' timetable has gradually been reduced from an initial five round-trips a day, down to just one round-trip a day.

Stena Line replaced the vessel with Stena Lynx III, which ran twice daily from 15 March 2010 to the end of 2010 apart from May to September, when Stena Explorer operated the route once daily to relieve the Stena Lynx so she could run on the Fishguard – Rosslare route.

On 26 May 2010, Stena Line re-instated Stena Explorer back on the Holyhead – Dún Laoghaire route one month earlier than planned.

On 14 September 2010, Stena Explorer left the Holyhead – Dún Laoghaire route with her last 2010 sailing being the 13:15 departure from Dún Laoghaire. Stena Lynx III operated the route until Sunday 9 January 2011. Stena Explorer returned on 1 April 2011 and will operate the route until 13 September 2011 on a one sailing a day basis.

Between 9–22 June 2011, Stena Explorer operated two round trips a day, due to Stena Adventurer, which operated on Stena Lines' Holyhead – Dublin service receiving her annual refit in Liverpool.

Stena have decided to make the Holyhead – Dún Laoghaire service a seasonal route following the sailing on 13 September 2011. The route resumed service on 30 March 2012 and ceased operation on 11 September 2012. She will return to the Dún Laoghaire – Holyhead for the Christmas and New Year period from 20 December – 5 January 2013 leaving Holyhead at 1030am and Dún Laoghaire at 1330. According to the Stenaline.ie booking engine, her 2013 season commenced on 22 March and ran until 10 September, before once again returning for Christmas 2013. For the 2013 season, her sailing time has been increased to 135 minutes which should enable further fuel savings. Stena Explorer returned on 20 December for 12 days of sailings from Dún Laoghaire to Holyhead and her 2014 season ran from 9 April – 9 September 2014. Unlike previous years, Stena Explorer did not operate additional services over the Christmas period.

On 4 February 2015, Stena Line announced that the HSS service to Dún Laoghaire was to be withdrawn and not restarted for 2015 with Stena Explorer being withdrawn from service. All services from Holyhead would be concentrated on Dublin Port, served by both Stena Line and Irish Ferries, where capacity was increased with the introduction of Stena Superfast X taking on the second ship role alongside Stena Adventurer and replacing Stena Nordica which was chartered to DFDS Seaways.

The original company that was contracted to manage the towage operation upon the sale of the ferry was dispensed with and replaced with Gull Marine Ltd, which resolved outstanding issues that were delaying the project and successfully executed the towage on behalf of the owners from the berth to the outer harbour in Holyhead. On 1 November 2015, she departed on tow from Holyhead and arrived in Turkey on 17 November.

In 2016 One World Karadeniz was in Karmarine shipyard in Yalova, near Istanbul, Turkey. The owner, Karadeniz Holding, had converted it into an "earthquake-resistant" floating office, research space and alternative power generator for the community of Istanbul. It is part of Karadeniz' Powerships project. The ship was then on sale for as low as 4.5 Million Pounds on Unlimited Offshore.

In 2023 the ship was renamed Karadeniz Lifeship Rauf Bey and converted into a temporary school to provide relief in İskenderun after the 2023 Turkey–Syria earthquakes.

== Incidents ==
In April 1998, members of the Real IRA attempted to transport two cars loaded with nearly 1000 lbs of explosive each into the UK on board Stena Explorer, however they were intercepted and arrested at Dun Laoghaire port. It was reportedly destined for the Aintree Racecourse, where it was to be detonated at the 1998 Grand National.

On 20 September 2001, Stena Explorer suffered a generator fire in one of her pontoons. Whilst going astern (reversing) into dock at her berth in Holyhead, a fire was detected in her auxiliary (generator) engine room in the port pontoon. Shortly after, the CCTV system, normally used for visual docking, became disabled due to lack of power. Knowing that just-completed checks showed that fire doors (lasting at least one hour) were closed, permission to shut off the engine in question was (correctly) denied by the Master of the Ship until final approach line-up with the Linkspan was confirmed. At that point, the failing Cummins generator was shut off.

In lieu of the CCTV system, docking distances were relayed to the bridge by portable radio. Berthing was complete within 5 minutes of the original fire alarm and fresh water was taken on board to replenish the Hi-fog fire suppression system whilst all 551 passengers were safely off-loaded. The fire brigade attended and the Hi-fog water mist was deactivated at their request. A nine-month Marine Accident Investigation Branch investigation found the fault to be incorrect fitting of a compression fitting used for a high-pressure fuel line leading to fuel spraying and igniting upon contact with the hot turbo-charger unit.

In October 2004, Stena Explorer had to turn back to port after a wave damaged the ship's hull 30 minutes into its voyage out of Holyhead.

On 15 February 2006, while on her journey to Holyhead, Stena Explorer struck a submerged object and was holed beneath the waterline. No one was injured and the vessel docked safely at Holyhead. The vessel was taken out of service for repairs after.
