= Nelson Tyler =

Engineer and inventor

Nelson Tyler is an engineer and inventor.

He was the designer and inventor of Wetbike, a personal watercraft that rides like a motorcycle. He has developed gyro-stabilized camera systems for aerial use and won an Academy Award in 2005 for one designed to be used on a boat. He developed a personal rocket pack which was used at the 1984 Olympics and in subsequent stunt flights. He has developed jet packs for JetPack Aviation and is now working on an electric-powered personal air vehicle.
