= Wetbike =

Brand of personal watercraft

WetBike
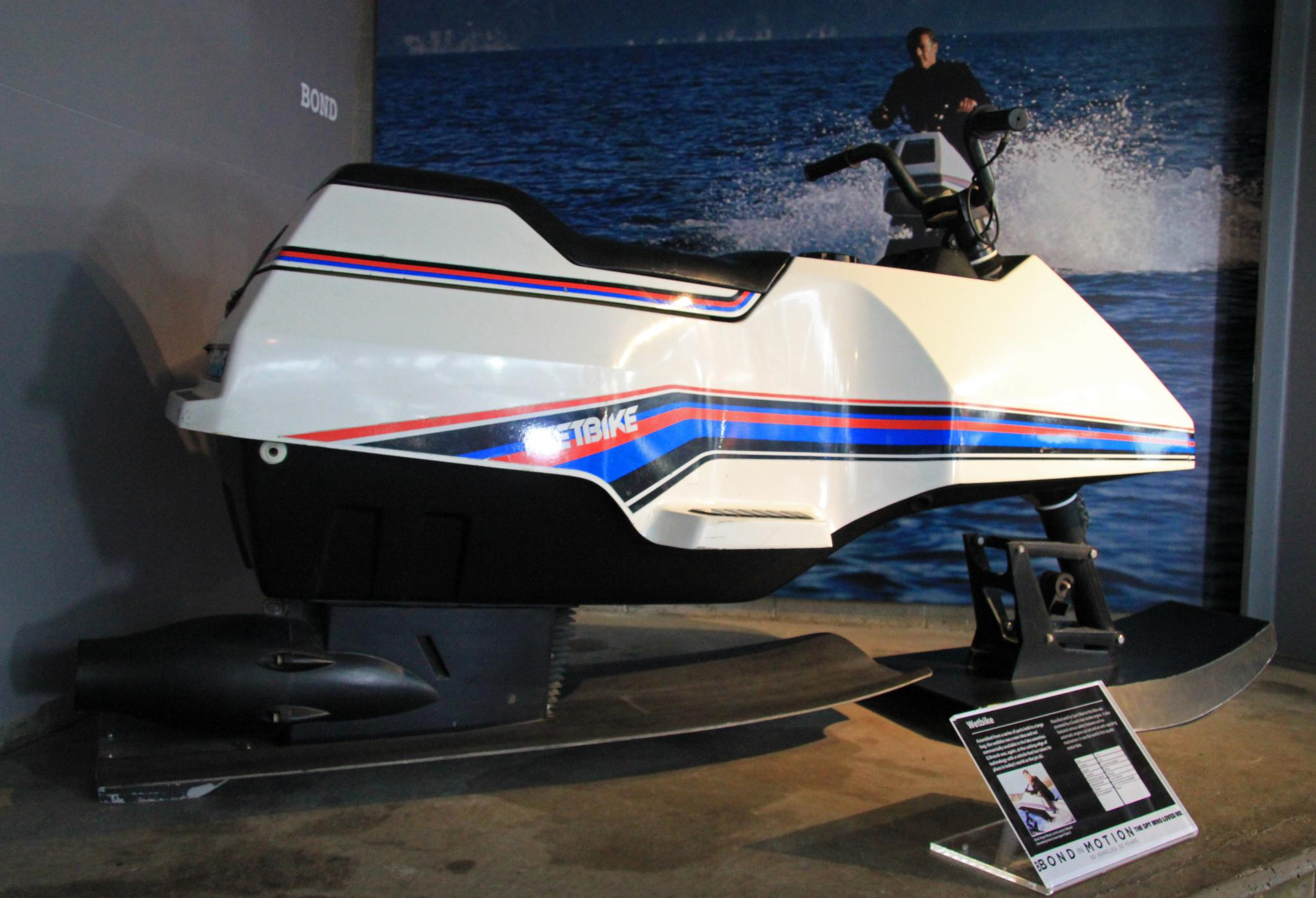
- Product type: Personal watercraft
- Current owner: Arctic Cat
- Produced by: Spirit Marine
- Country: United States
- Introduced: 1978
- Discontinued: 1992
- Markets: Worldwide

A WetBike is a planing motorised personal water craft that is often described as cross between a motorcycle and a jet ski. The original Wetbike was introduced in 1978 by Spirit Marine, a subsidiary of Arctic Enterprises (now known as Arctic Cat).

== Evolution ==
Characteristics
Engine Type	Two-stroke
Power	50 hp (37 kW) or 60 hp (45 kW)
Displacement	723 cubic centimetres (44.1 cu in) or 798 cubic centimetres (48.7 cu in)
Type of lubrication	Premixed lubricant and fuel
Mixing ratio	50:1
Spark plug	B8HS
Length	7.75 ft (2.36 m)
Width	26 in (660 mm)

The original Wetbike was designed by Nelson Tyler, who became well known for his film industry camera mounts known as the "Tyler Mount". It was based on a motorcycle, replacing the wheels with skis and using a pump-jet for propulsion. It debuted in 1978, a few years after the Kawasaki Jet Ski, by Spirit Marine, a subsidiary of what is now Arctic Cat.

At rest, it resembles a sit-down jet ski. Gaining speed, it would eventually lift up on the skis and begin to plane. Directional control was achieved by rotating the front ski (as opposed to a jet ski, where one rotates the hydrojet). Originally, the Wetbike was powered by a Suzuki two-stroke engine. During the later years of Wetbikes (late 1980s) there were considerable advances, such as 60 hp Suzuki 800 cc engines, and Metton hulls, which were much lighter than previous models.

Eventually the Wetbike gave way to the new personal water craft (PWC) such as the Yamaha WaveRunner, mainly because the latter are much easier to ride. Wetbikes were last produced in 1992. The design was ultimately sold to Kawasaki.

== Appearances in media ==
The first appearance of a Wetbike was in the 1977 James Bond film The Spy Who Loved Me. In a scene near the film's end, Bond is seen riding the Spirit Marine prototype to villain Karl Stromberg's submergible fortress. Bond refers to the Wetbike as a Q gadget.

Wetbikes appears in the 1982 CHiPs episode "Overload". After a short recreational excursion, the lead motorcycle police officers use them to chase down thieves trying to escape in a speedboat. A sign in the background indicates that the craft could be rented for $10 per hour, or $75 for a full day.

A Wetbike appears in the 1983 The Fall Guy episode "Devil's Island" where it is used to escape a primitive island prison.

One appears in the 1983 Terence Hill & Bud Spencer spy comedy Go For It!, when Hill was pursuing and picking up Susan Teesdale's character, the lethal barmaid who tried to escape with a parasail.

A Wetbike appears in the 1986 comedy Police Academy 3: Back in Training, in which a group of them and Kawasaki JS550 stand up jet skis were used by the police to chase down thieves in speedboats during the movie's ending chase scene.

In the 1990 George Clooney film Red Surf, a Wetbike is used by a gang of surfers to transport cocaine.

== See also ==
- List of James Bond vehicles
