= HSC HSS Discovery =

Ferry

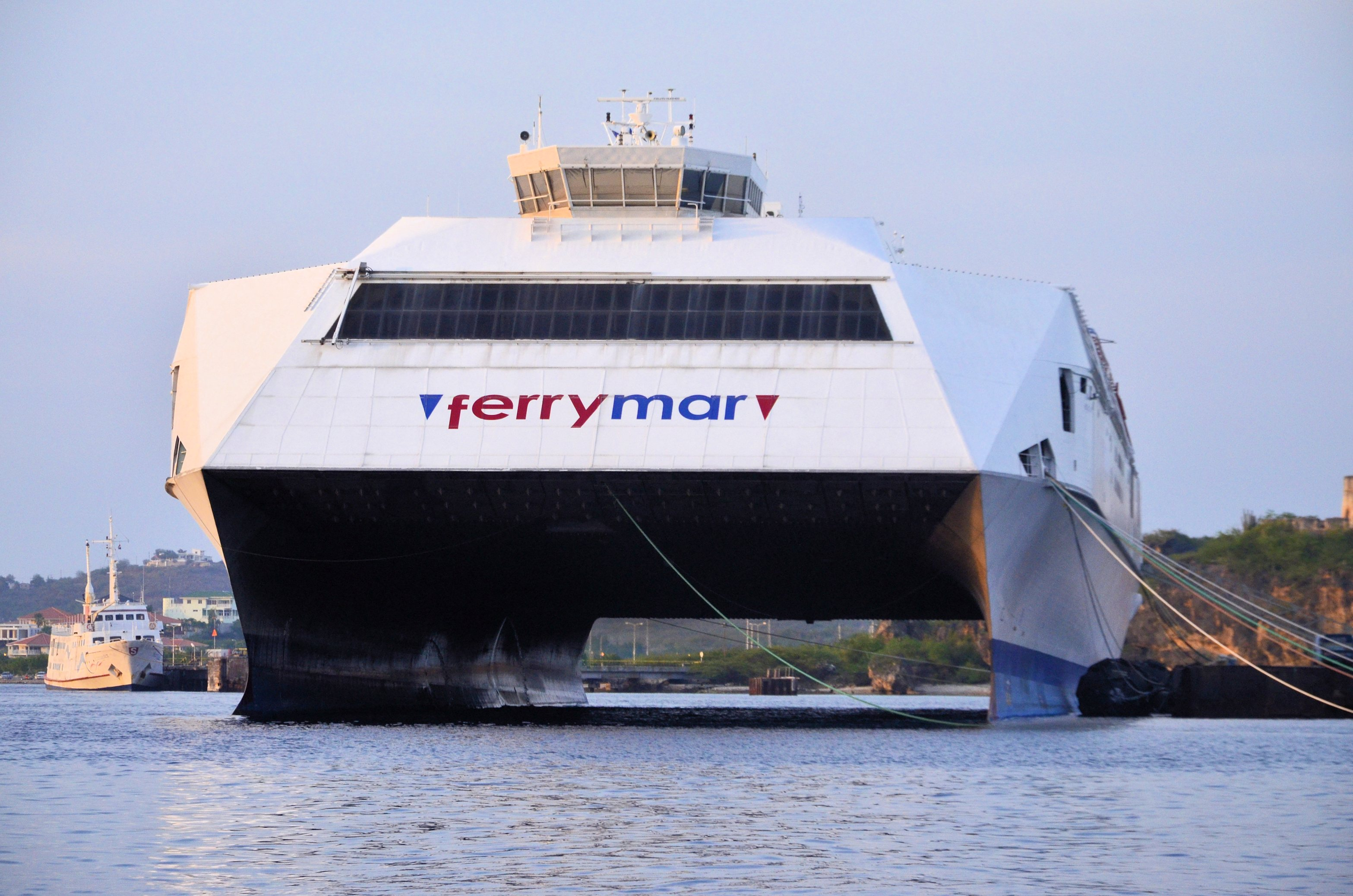
- Stena Discovery laid up in Curaçao

History
- Name: 1997–2009: Stena Discovery; 2009 onwards: HSS 'Discovery
- Operator: 1997–2009: Stena Line; 2009 onwards: Albamar Shipping Company
- Port of registry: 1997–2009: Hook of Holland The Netherlands; 2009-2011: Nassau (The Bahamas) Bahamas; 2011-2015: Puerto la Cruz Venezuela; 2015: Tanzania
- Builder: Finnyards, Finland
- Cost: £65,000,000
- Yard number: 406
- Launched: 14 December 1996
- In service: April 1997
- Identification: IMO number: 9107590
- Fate: Scrapped in Aliağa, Turkey in 2015

General characteristics
- Class & type: HSS 1500
- Developed by: Stena Rederi AB
- Tonnage: 19,638 GT
- Length: 126.6 m (415 ft 4 in)
- Beam: 40.0 m (131 ft 3 in)
- Draught: 4.8 m (15 ft 9 in)
- Installed power: COGAG Turbines: 2× GE LM2500; 2× GE LM1600
- Propulsion: 4× Kamewa Type S waterjets
- Speed: 40 knots
- Capacity: 1,500 passengers; 375 cars; 800 lane metres

HSS Discovery was a high-speed ferry owned by Albamar Shipping Company. She was a member of the HSS 1500 class of high-speed ferries, built for and designed by Stena Line from 1996 onwards. She was previously Stena Discovery, and operated for Stena Line between Harwich International Port in the United Kingdom and Hook of Holland, the Netherlands.

== Design and construction ==
Finnyards in Rauma, Finland built the ship. Building began in 1996, and the ship entered service in April 1997.

The ship was a catamaran, designed to provide a comfortable and fast service.

Power was provided by four GE Aviation gas turbines in a twin combined gas and gas (COGAG) configuration. Four Kamewa waterjets propelled the ship.

The HSS class of ferries was designed to allow quick turnarounds at port. A specially designed linkspan provides ropeless mooring, and allows quick loading, unloading and servicing. Vehicles were loaded via two of the four stern doors, and parked in a "U" layout. When disembarking, vehicles drove straight off via the other three doors.

== Career ==
As Stena Discovery, the ship ran between Harwich and Hook of Holland for Stena Line, from her introduction in 1997 until January 2007, when she was taken out of service due to her high fuel consumption. She was laid up at Belfast between January 2007 and September 2009, before leaving for La Guaira, Venezuela under the ownership of Albamar Shipping Company. Before leaving Belfast, the "Stena" prefix was deleted from the ship's name.

She served only briefly in Venezuela, and was taken out of service again in 2009. In November 2011, she was moved to Curaçao in an attempt to attract investors for a new ferry service between Curaçao and La Guaira. She was subject to a criminal investigation soon after, regarding irregular trade of diesel fuel from her ballast tanks. She was scrapped in Aliağa, Turkey between August and November 2015.

== Incidents ==
- In January 1998, Stena Discovery was travelling at full speed when she hit a 3.5 metres (11 ft) swell, resulting in water being pushed up over her nose and hitting her bridge windows. It tore through the underside of the nose. It was later discovered that this was beyond Stena Discovery's design capability. Small air holes were fitted on the underside of the nose to prevent a repeat incident.
- In March 2001, the driver of an 18 tonne lorry, loaded with 12 tonnes of fresh fish, failed to put his vehicle's handbrake on during a crossing of Stena Discovery from Hook of Holland to Harwich. As the ferry accelerated, the lorry rolled back, crashed through the ship's stern doors, and fell into the North Sea. It took with it three smaller vans, as well as one of the stern doors. The ship returned to Hook of Holland, and was taken out of service for repairs. Damage to the door and loss of the vehicles was estimated to be about £200,000.
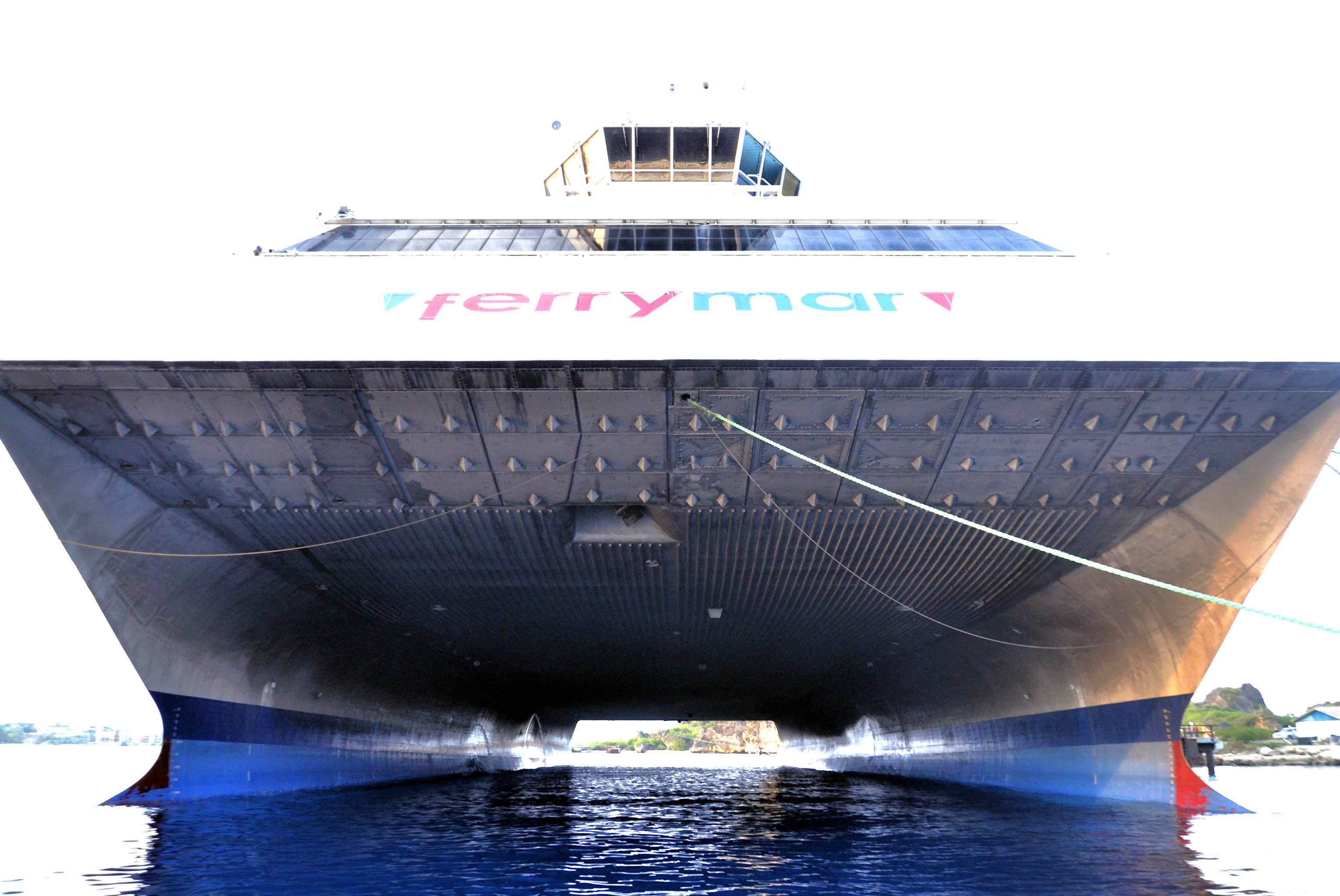
After the 1998 incident, 'shark fin' covered air holes were fitted on the underside of the nose.

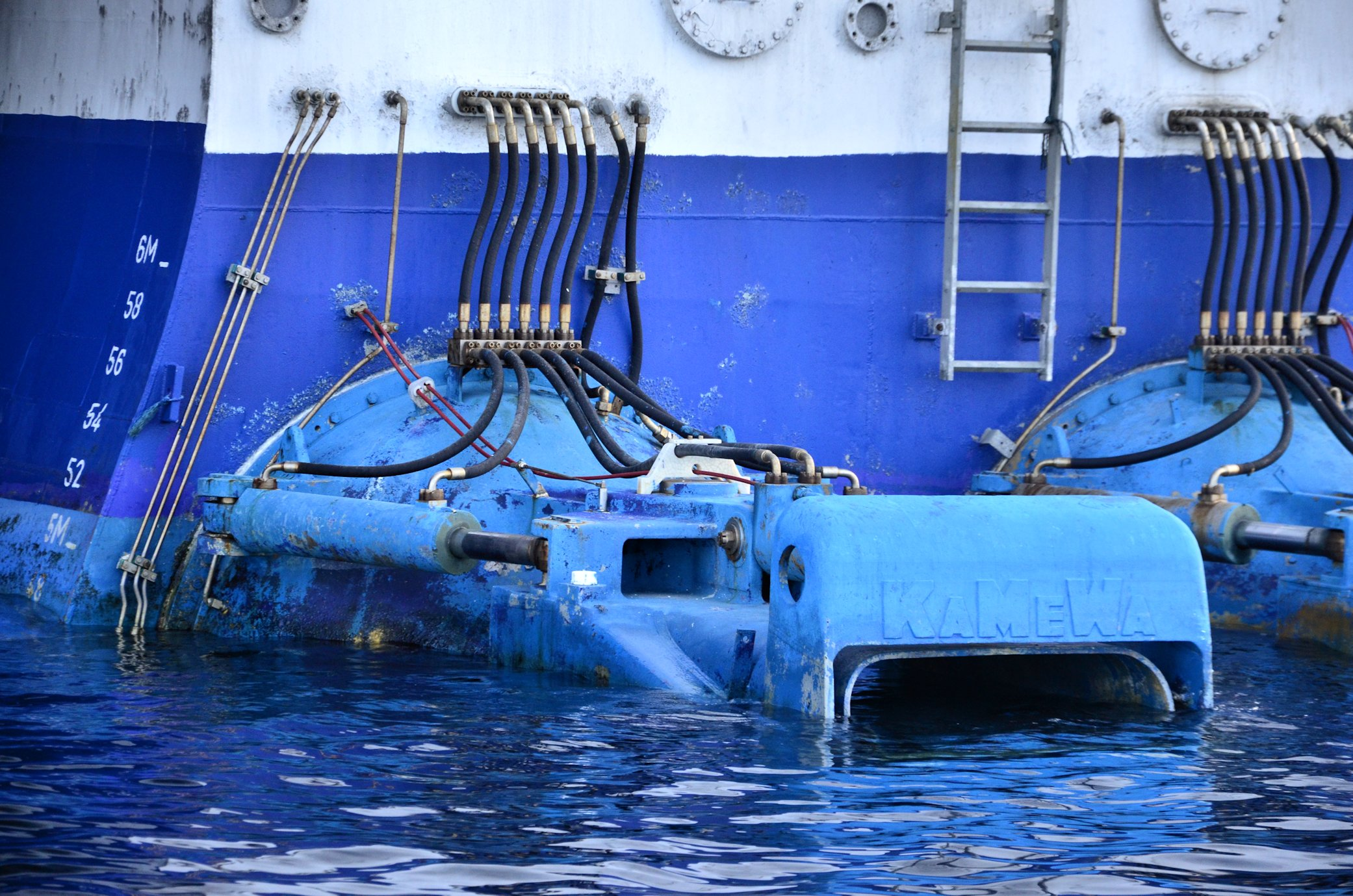
One of the four Kamewa waterjets.

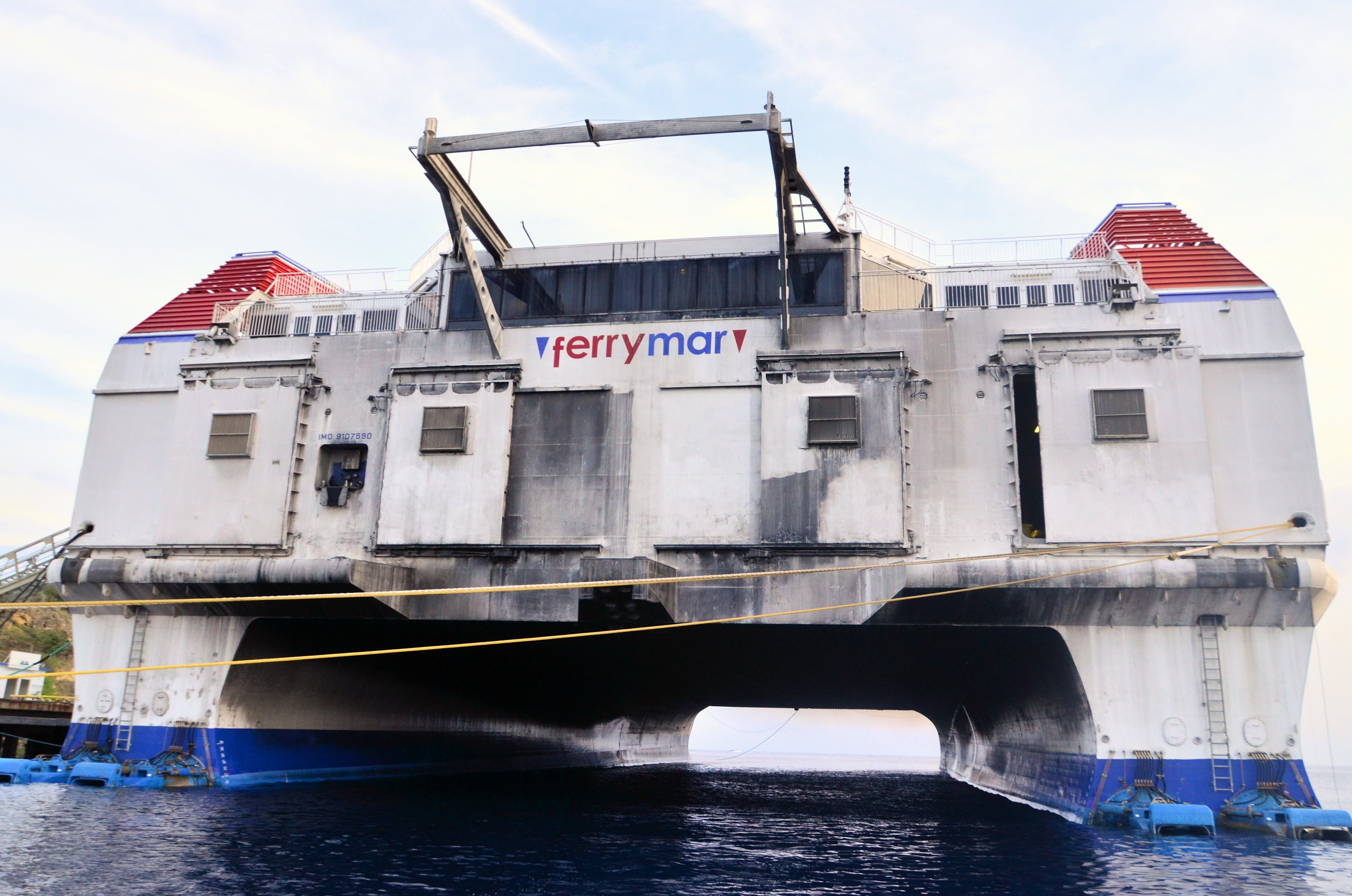
Laid up in Curaçao. The dirt on the back is soot from the diesel generators.

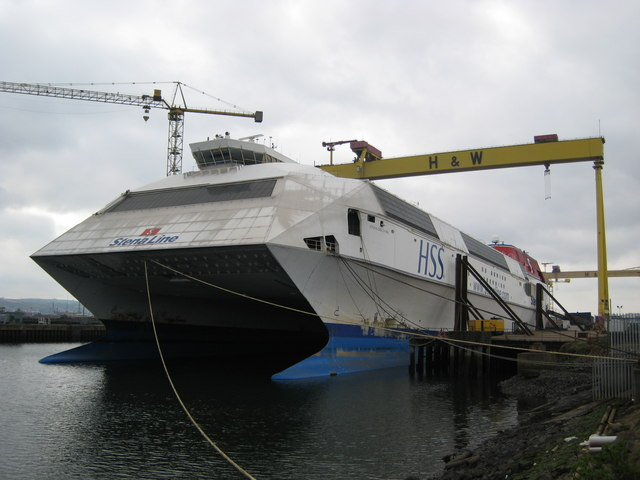
Laid up in Belfast, April 2007.

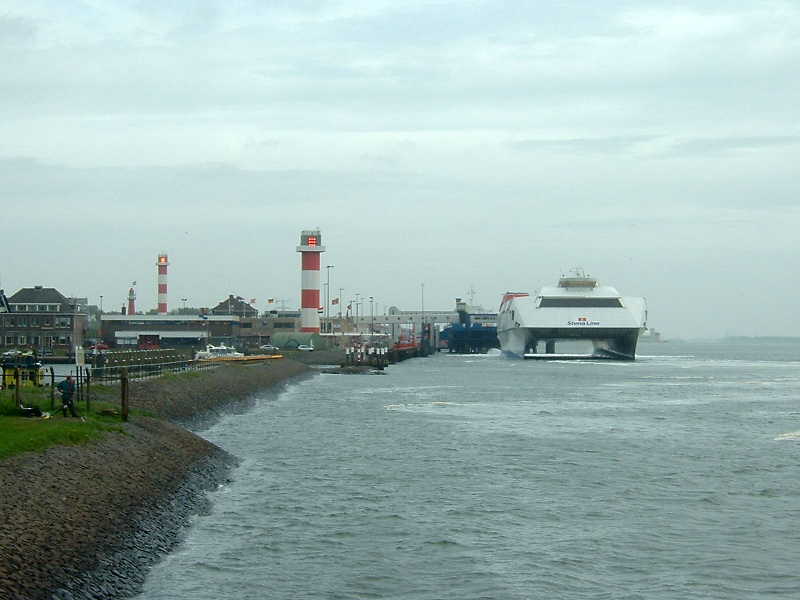
Glory days: mooring at Hook of Holland on return from Harwich (2005).

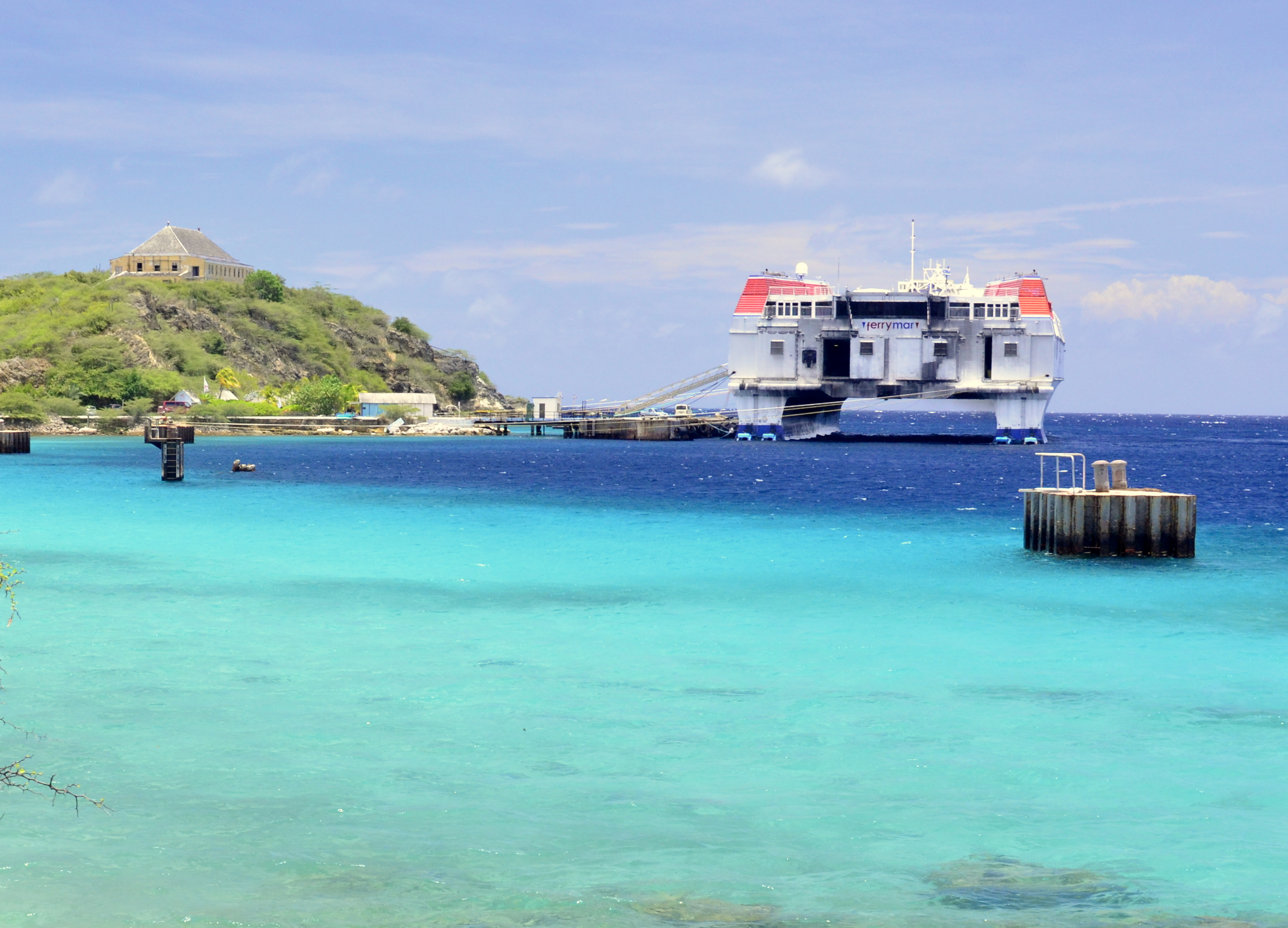
Inactive, in the Caribbean Sea in Curaçao.
