= General Electric LM1600 =

Gas turbine

LM1600
- Type: Gas turbine
- National origin: United States
- Manufacturer: General Electric
- Developed from: General Electric F404

The General Electric LM1600 is an industrial and marine gas turbine produced by GE Aviation. The LM1600 is a derivative of the General Electric F404 aircraft engine series. The LM1600 delivers 20,000 shaft horsepower (shp) (14,920 kW) with a thermal efficiency of 37 percent at ISO conditions.

== Applications ==
Applications include marine propulsion, and industrial use at Dusty Lake Station and Foret LaZaida.

Examples of marine applications

- Destriero
- Enigma
- HSC Stena Voyager
- HSC Stena Explorer
- HSC HSS Discovery
- Mols-Linien

== See also ==
Related development

- General Electric F404
- General Electric CF6
- General Electric LM2500
- General Electric LM6000
- General Electric LMS100

Related lists

- List of aircraft engines
