= ISO 3977 =

International standard

ISO 3977 is an international standard related to the design and procurement of gas turbine system applications. ISO 3977 is based primarily on the ASME 133 series on gas turbines, as well as the API 616 and API 11PGT standards. The standard environmental design point of any gas turbine system is 15 °C, 60% relative humidity, and sea level elevation. The standard is divided into eight parts and covers procurement, design requirements, installation, and reliability.

== Parts ==
- ISO 3977-1:1997 Part 1: General introduction and definitions
- ISO 3977-2:1997 Part 2: Standard reference conditions and ratings
- ISO 3977-3:2004 Part 3: Design requirements
- ISO 3977-4:2002 Part 4: Fuels and environment
- ISO 3977-5:2001 Part 5: Applications for petroleum and natural gas industries
- ISO 3977-7:2002 Part 7: Technical information
- ISO 3977-8:2002 Part 8: Inspection, testing, installation and commissioning
- ISO 3977-9:1999 Part 9: Reliability, availability, maintainability and safety
