= General Electric LM2500 =

Industrial and marine gas turbine produced by GE Aerospace

LM2500
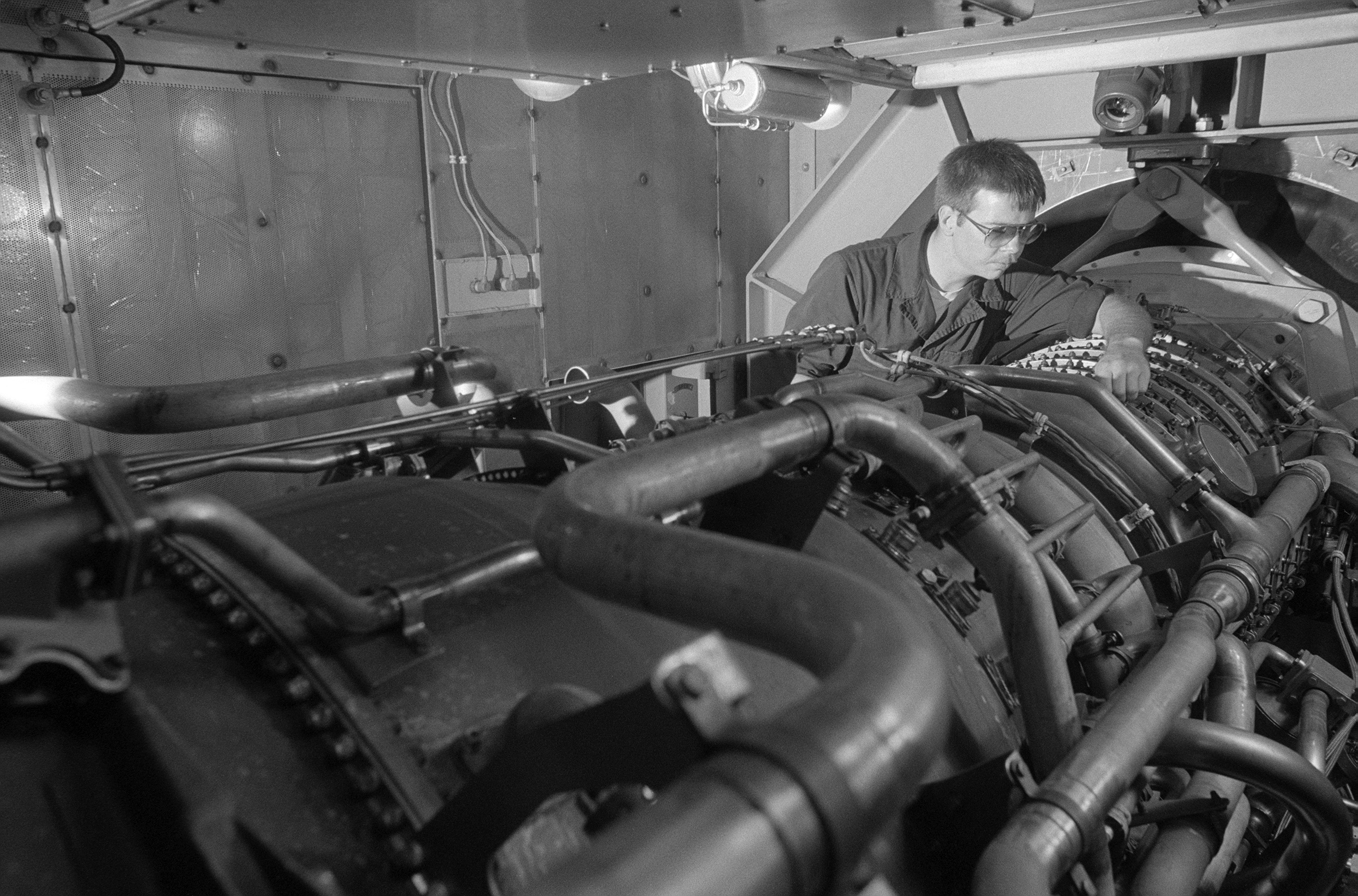
- An LM2500 on USS Ford
- Type: Aeroderivative gas turbine
- National origin: United States
- Manufacturer: GE Aviation
- First run: 1960s
- Major applications: Ships including Queen Mary 2
- Developed from: General Electric CF6

The General Electric LM2500 is an industrial and marine gas turbine produced by GE Aviation. The LM2500 is a derivative of the General Electric CF6-6 aircraft engine.

As of 2004, the U.S. Navy and at least 29 other navies had used a total of more than one thousand LM2500/LM2500+ gas turbines to power warships. Other uses include hydrofoils, hovercraft and fast ferries.

In 2012, GE developed an FPSO version to serve the oil and gas industry's demand for a lighter, more compact version to generate electricity and drive compressors to send natural gas through pipelines.

== Design and development ==
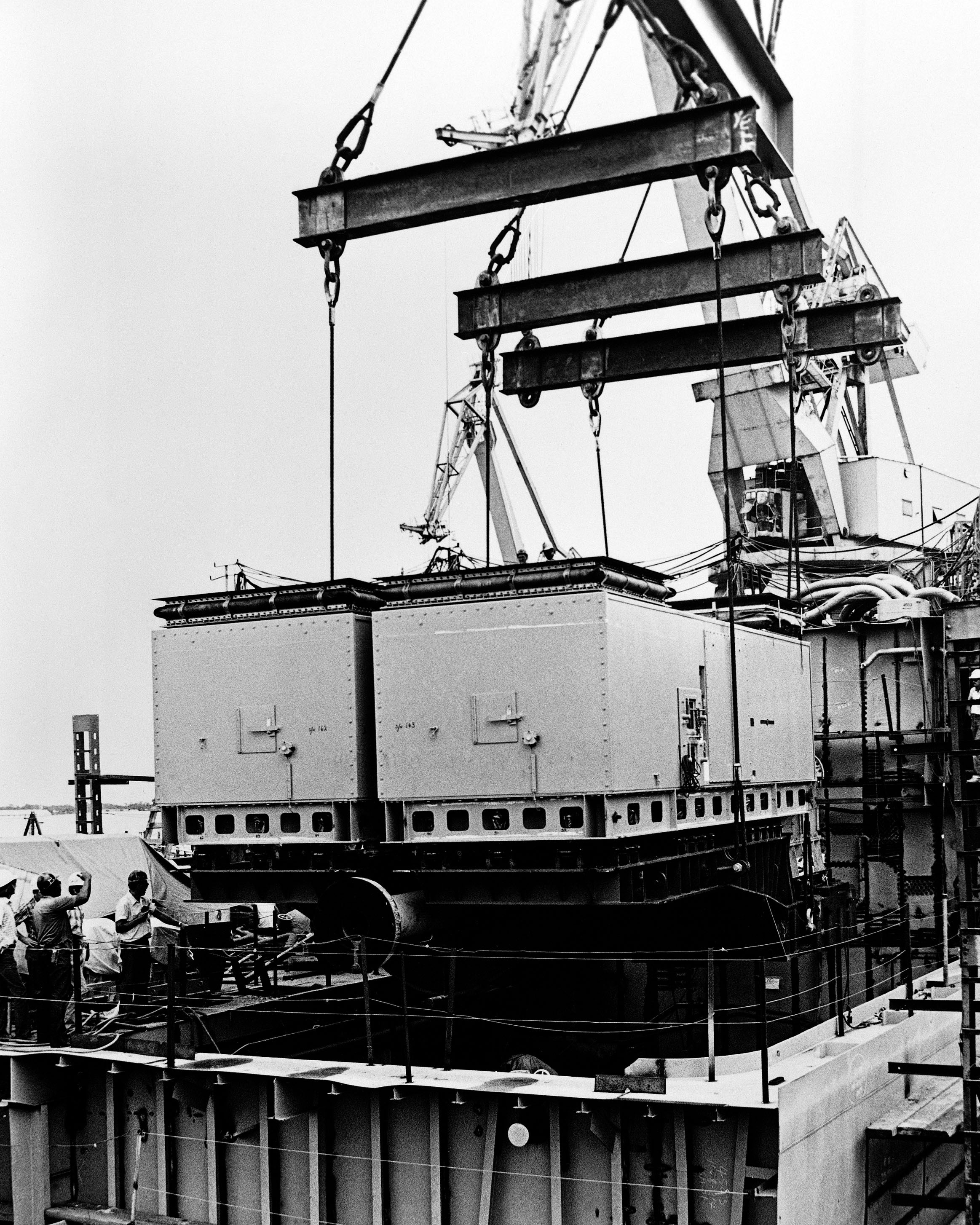
A heavy lift lowers the main propulsion module into the hull of USS Bunker Hill during construction at Ingalls Shipbuilding. The module consists of two General Electric LM2500 gas turbine engines and a Westinghouse gear reduction unit.

The LM2500 was first used on the US Navy GTS Admiral W. M. Callaghan in December 1969 as part of comparative trials against the older and proven Pratt & Whitney FT4 for future use aboard the Spruance-class destroyers. After the trials showed the LM2500 to have 20% less fuel consumption and comparable reliability, LM2500 secured the contract for use on the Spruance class, with the first units ordered in 1970. In this configuration it was rated to 21,500 shp (16,000 kW). Shortly thereafter it saw use aboard the Oliver Hazard Perry-class frigates and the latter half of the decade saw their installation in the related Kidd-class destroyers and Ticonderoga-class cruisers. It was also used by one of People's Republic of China's Type 052 destroyers acquired before the embargo.

The LM2500 was uprated to 26,500 shp (19,800 kW) for the Arleigh Burke-class destroyers, which were initiated in the 1980s and started to see service in the early 1990s, and the Supply-class fast combat support ships.

In 2001 the LM2500 (20 MW) was installed in a sound-proof capsule in the South African Navy Valour class (Meko A-200 SAN) frigates as part of a CODAG propulsion system with two MTU 16V 1163 TB93 propulsion diesels.

The current generation was uprated in the late 1990s to over 30,000 shp (22,000 kW).

The LM2500 is typically installed within a metal enclosure that provides sound and thermal isolation from adjacent machinery spaces. This enclosure is comparable in size to a standard 40-foot (12 m) intermodal shipping container, although the engine’s dimensions slightly exceed standard container measurements. Air intake ducting is often designed to facilitate straightforward removal of the LM2500 from the vessel.

The LM2500+ is an evolution of the LM2500, delivering up to 40,200 shp (30,000 kW) or 28.6 MW of electric energy when combined with an electrical generator. Two of such turbo-generators have been installed in the superstructure near the funnel of Queen Mary 2, the world's largest transatlantic ocean liner, for additional electric energy for the liner to reach higher sea speeds. Celebrity Cruises uses two LM2500+ engines in their Millennium-class cruise ships in a COGES cycle.

The LM2500 is license-built in India by Hindustan Aeronautics Limited; in Italy by Avio Aero; and in Japan by IHI Corporation. (Subsequent to the February 2024 reporting of an IHI company whistleblower; On April 24, 2024, IHI announced that investigation was underway by Japan's Ministry of Land, Infrastructure, Transport and Tourism of its subsidiary, IHI Power Systems Co., which had falsified its engine data since 2003, impacting over 4,000 engines globally.)

The LM2500/LM2500+ can often be found as turbine part of CODAG, CODOG, CODLAG propulsion systems or in pairs as powerplants for COGAG systems.

== Naval application ==
=== United States ===
Amphibious assault ships

- America class
- USS Makin Island

Cruisers

- Ticonderoga class

Destroyers

- Arleigh Burke class
- Kidd class
- Spruance class

Frigates

- Constellation class
- Oliver Hazard Perry class

Fast combat support ships

- Supply class

Roll-on/Roll-off

- GTS Admiral W. M. Callaghan
- Watson class

High endurance cutters

- Legend class

Littoral combat ships

- Independence class

Hydrofoils

- Pegasus class

=== Export ===
Algeria
Frigates
- Erradii class

Australia
Amphibious assault ships
- Canberra class
Destroyers
- Hobart class
Frigates
- Adelaide class
- Anzac class

Bahrain
Frigates
- Oliver Hazard Perry class

Brazil
Corvettes
- Inhauma class
- Barroso

Canada
Frigates
- Halifax class

Chile
Frigates
- Adelaide class

China
Destroyers
- Type 052

Denmark
Corvettes
- Niels Juel class

Egypt
Frigates
- Al-Aziz class
- FREMM class
- Oliver Hazard Perry class

Finland
Corvettes
- Pohjanmaa class

France
Frigates
- Aquitaine class
- Horizon class

Germany
Frigates
- Baden-Württemberg class
- Brandenburg class
- Bremen class
- Sachsen class

Greece
Frigates
- Hydra class

India
Aircraft carriers
- INS Vikrant
Frigates
- Nilgiri class
- Shivalik class
Corvettes
- Next Generation Missile Vessels

Indonesia
Frigates
- Thaon di Revel class
Fast attack craft
- Mandau class

Italy
Aircraft carriers
- Cavour
- Giuseppe Garibaldi
Destroyers
- Durand de la Penne class
- Horizon class
Frigates
- Bergamini class
- Lupo class
- Maestrale class
Offshore patrol vessels
- Thaon di Revel class

Israel
Corvettes
- Sa'ar 5 class

Japan
Helicopter destroyers
- Izumo class
- Hyūga class
Destroyers
- Asahi class
- Atago class
- Kongō class
- Maya class
- Murasame class
- Takanami class
Research vessels
- JS Asuka

Morocco
Frigates
- Mohammed VI

New Zealand
Frigates
- Anzac class

Norway
Frigates
- Fridtjof Nansen class

Pakistan
Frigates
- Jinnah class
- Oliver Hazard Perry class
Corvettes
- Babur class

Peru
Frigates
- Lupo class

Philippines
Corvettes
- BRP Conrado Yap

Poland
Frigates
- Oliver Hazard Perry class

Portugal
Frigates
- Vasco da Gama class

South Africa
Frigates
- Valour class

South Korea
Destroyers
- Chungmugong Yi Sun-sin class
- Gwanggaeto the Great class
- Sejong the Great class
Frigates
- Ulsan class

Spain
Aircraft carriers
- Príncipe de Asturias
Amphibious assault ships
- Juan Carlos I
Frigates
- Álvaro de Bazán class
- Bonifaz class
- Santa María class

Taiwan
Destroyers
- Kee Lung class
Frigates
- Cheng Kung class
- Oliver Hazard Perry class

Thailand
Aircraft carriers
- HTMS Chakri Naruebet
Frigates
- Bhumibol Adulyadej class
- Naresuan class

Turkey
Aircraft carriers
- MUGEM class
Destroyers
- Tepe class
Frigates
- Barbaros class
- İstif class
- G class
Corvettes
- Ada class
Replenishment oilers
- TCG Derya

Venezuela
Frigates
- Lupo class

=== Civilian operators ===
Cruise ships

- Vista class (Holland America Line)
- Coral class (Princess Cruises)
- Gem class (Princess Cruises)
- Millennium class (Celebrity Cruises)
- Radiance class (Royal Caribbean International)

Ocean liners

- Queen Mary 2 (Cunard)

Ferry

- HSC Francisco (Buquebus)

== Variants ==
The LM2500 is available in three different versions:

- The LM2500 delivers 33,600 shp (25,100 kW) with a thermal efficiency of 37 percent at ISO conditions. When coupled with an electric generator, it delivers 24 MW of electricity at 60 Hz with a thermal efficiency of 36 percent at ISO conditions.
- The improved, 3rd generation, LM2500+ version of the turbine delivers 40,500 shp (30,200 kW) with a thermal efficiency of 39 percent at ISO conditions. When coupled with an electric generator, it delivers 29 MW of electricity at 60 Hz with a thermal efficiency of 38 percent at ISO conditions.
- The latest, fourth generation, LM2500+G4 version was introduced in November 2005 and delivers 47,370 shp (35,320 kW) with a thermal efficiency of 39.3 percent at ISO conditions.

=== Derivatives ===
- The GE TM2500 is derived from the LM2500, and mounted on a trailer that makes it possible to move it to wherever 30 MW of temporary electricity generation is required. It can be installed and commissioned in 11 days.

== Specifications ==
The basic LM2500 has a single shaft gas generator derived from the CF6 with an annular combustion chamber. The LM2500+ variants generate additional power by the addition of a "zero stage" to the compressor.

LM 2500 series gas turbine engines specifications
Performance category	LM2500	LM2500+	LM2500+G4
Compressor	16 HP	17 HP	
Turbine	2 HP, 6 LP		
Output	33,600 shp (25,060 kW)	40,500 shp (30,200 kW)	47,370 shp (35,320 kW)
Fuel consumption	0.373 lb/shp-hr (227 g/kW-hr)	0.354 lb/shp-hr (215 g/kW-hr)	0.352 lb/shp-hr (214 g/kW-hr)
Heat rate	6,860 Btu/shp-hr (9,705 kJ/kW-hr)	6,522 Btu/shp-hr (9,227 kJ/kW-hr)	6,469 Btu/shp-hr (9,150 kJ/kW-hr)
Exhaust gas flow	155 lb/s (70.5 kg/s)	189 lb/s (85.9 kg/s)	205 lb/s (93 kg/s)
Exhaust gas temperature	1,051°F (566°C)	965°F (518°C)	1,020°F (549°C)
Turbine speed (rpm)	3,600		
Thermal efficiency	36%	38%	39%
Weight	4.7 ton	5.25 ton	5.25 ton

== See also ==
Related development

- General Electric CF6
- General Electric LM1600
- General Electric LM6000
- General Electric LMS100

Comparable engines

- Rolls-Royce MT30

Related lists

- List of aircraft engines
