= Pump-jet =

Marine propulsion system

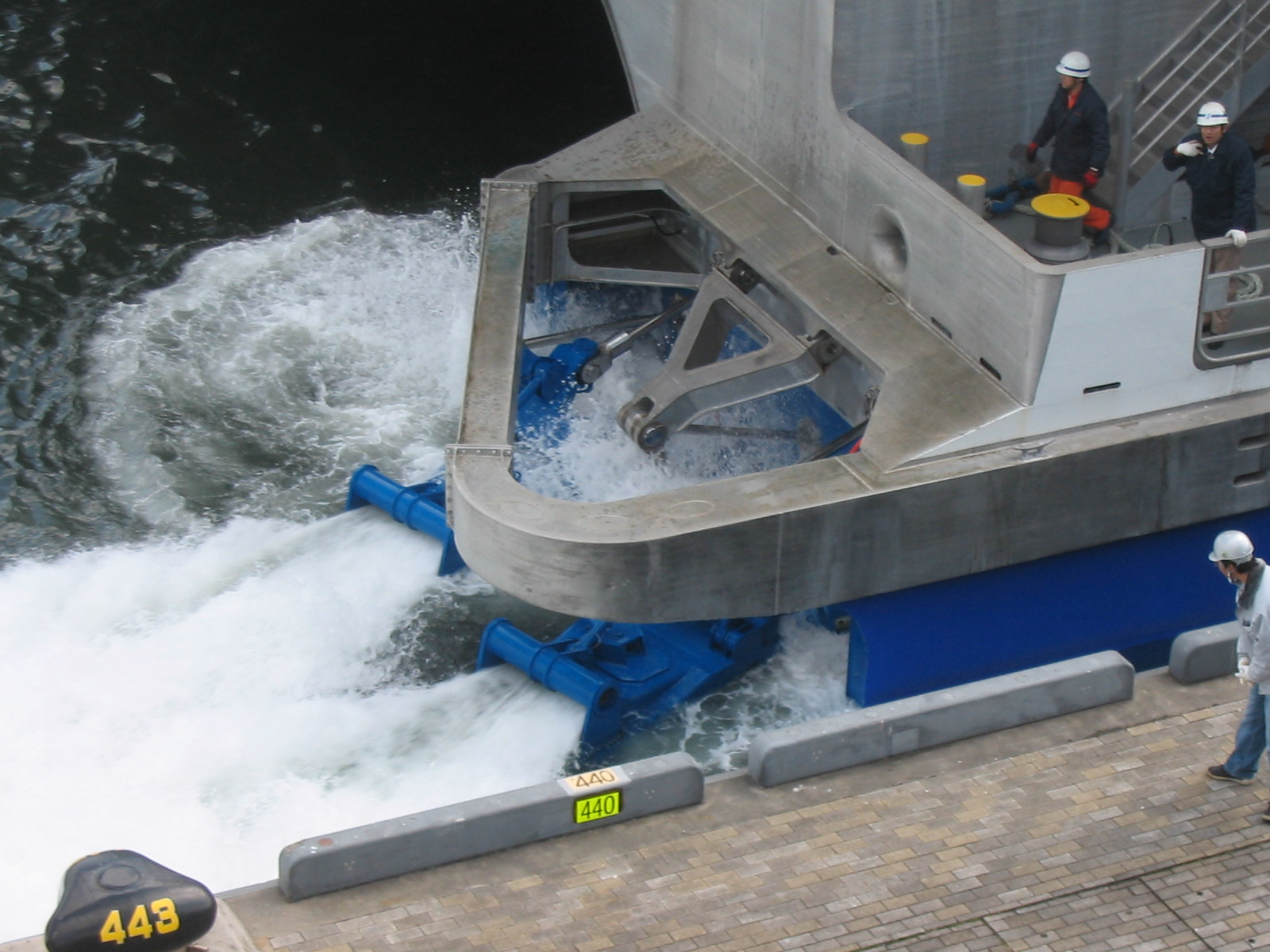
A view of pump-jets operating

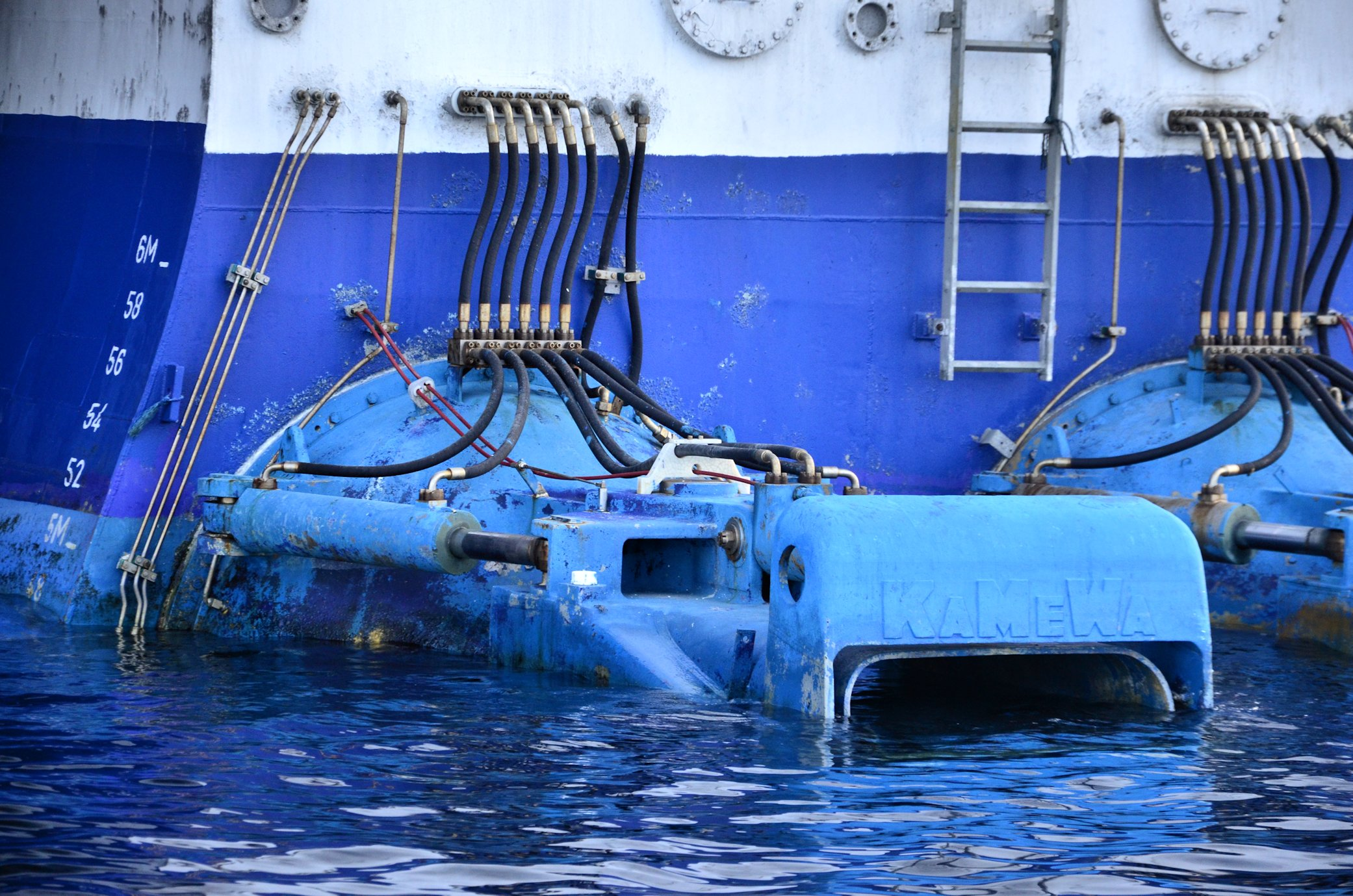
Two of four KaMeWa waterjets on the high-speed ferry Discovery

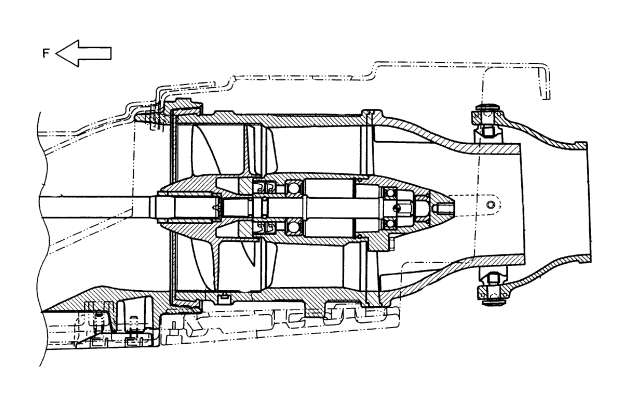
Typical jet ski pump jet

A pump-jet, hydrojet, or water jet is a marine system that produces a jet of water for propulsion. The mechanical arrangement may be a ducted propeller (axial-flow pump), a centrifugal pump, or a mixed flow pump which is a combination of both centrifugal and axial designs. The design also incorporates an intake to provide water to the pump and a nozzle to direct the flow of water out of the pump.

== Design ==
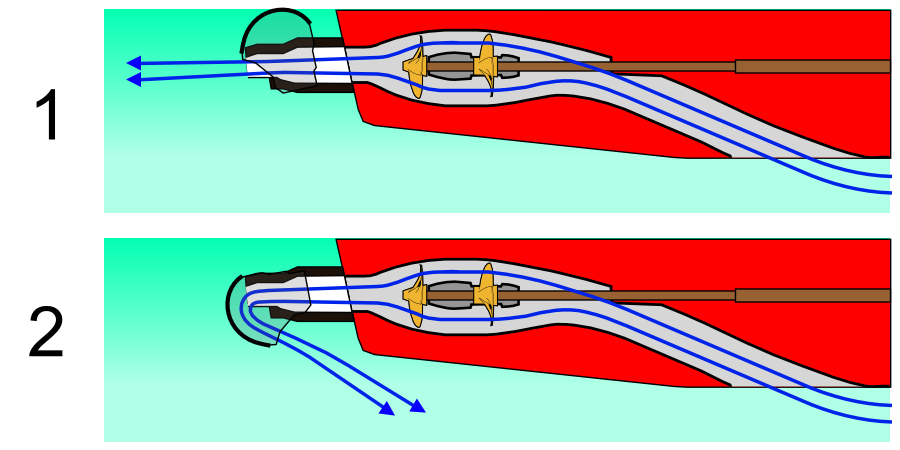
This image illustrates the workings of a reversing bucket. 1: Forward thrust, reversing bucket disengaged 2: Reverse thrust, reversing bucket pushes the thrust flow backwards. This pump-jet has a pair of contrarotating blades.

Forward, back, side and turn by pump-jet

A pump-jet works by having an intake (usually at the bottom of the hull) that allows water to pass underneath the vessel into the engines. Water enters the pump through this inlet. The pump can be of a centrifugal design for high speeds, or an axial-flow pump for low to medium speeds. The water pressure inside the inlet is increased by the pump and forced backwards through a nozzle. With the use of a reversing bucket, reverse thrust can also be achieved for faring backwards, quickly and without the need to change gear or adjust engine thrust. The reversing bucket can also be used to help slow the ship down when braking. This feature is the main reason pump-jets are so maneuverable.

The nozzle also provides the steering of the pump-jets. Plates, similar to rudders, can be attached to the nozzle in order to redirect the water flow port and starboard. In a way, this is similar to the principles of air thrust vectoring, a technique which has long been used in launch vehicles (rockets and missiles) then later in military jet-powered aircraft. This provides pump-jet-powered ships with superior agility at sea. Another advantage is that when faring backwards by using the reversing bucket, steering is not inverted, as opposed to propeller-powered ships.

=== Axial flow ===
An axial-flow waterjet's pressure is increased by diffusing the flow as it passes through the impeller blades and stator vanes. The pump nozzle then converts this pressure energy into velocity, thus producing thrust.

Axial-flow waterjets produce high volumes at lower velocity, making them well suited to larger low to medium speed craft, the exception being personal water craft, where the high water volumes create tremendous thrust and acceleration as well as high top speeds. But these craft also have high power-to-weight ratios compared to most marine craft. Axial-flow waterjets are by far the most common type of pump.

=== Centrifugal flow ===
Centrifugal-flow waterjet designs make use of radial flow to create water pressure.

Examples of centrifugal designs are the Schottel Pump-Jet and outboard sterndrives.

=== Mixed flow ===
Mixed-flow waterjet designs incorporate aspects of both axial flow and centrifugal flow pumps. Pressure is developed by both diffusion and radial outflow. Mixed flow designs produce lower volumes of water at high velocity making them suited for small to moderate craft sizes and higher speeds. Common uses include high speed pleasure craft and waterjets for shallow water river racing (see River Marathon).

== Advantages ==
Pump jets have some advantages over bare propellers for certain applications, usually related to requirements for high-speed or shallow-draft operations. These include:

- Higher speed before the onset of cavitation, because of the raised internal dynamic pressure
- High power density (with respect to volume) of both the propulsor and the prime mover (because a smaller, higher-speed unit can be used)
- Protection of the rotating element, making operation safer around swimmers and aquatic life
- Improved shallow-water operations, because only the inlet needs to be submerged
- Increased maneuverability, by adding a steerable nozzle to create vectored thrust
- Noise reduction, resulting in a low sonar signature. This kind of system is also known as a "shrouded propeller configuration" because the pump can be understood as a conformal shroud and a set of stator blades added onto a propeller – a step beyond the ducted propeller. In this view, the stator serves to "recycle" the rotational energy of the outflow into thrust. Applications include:
  - Warships designed for low observability, for example the Swedish Visby-class and the Indian ASW-SWC class corvettes.
  - Submarines, for example the Royal Navy Trafalgar class and Astute class, the US Navy Seawolf class and Virginia class, the French Navy Triomphant class and Barracuda class, the Russian Navy Borei class and also by Indian Navy upcoming Project 77-class submarine.
  - Modern torpedoes, such as the NSTL Shakti THWT, Spearfish, the Mk 48, and Mk 50 weapons.
    - The Mk 48 has also been described as using contra-rotating marine propellers. However, it does have a fully-enclosing, conformal shroud. Computer-generated images released by the US Navy in 2011 appear to suggest only one set of rotating blades.

== History ==
The water jet principle in shipping industry can be traced back to 1661 when Togood and Hayes produced a description of a ship having a central water channel in which either a plunger or centrifugal pump was installed to provide the motive power.

On December 3, 1787, inventor James Rumsey demonstrated a water-jet propelled boat using a steam-powered pump to drive a stream of water from the stern. This occurred on the Potomac River at Shepherdstown, Virginia (now West Virginia) before a crowd of witnesses including General Horatio Gates. The 50-foot long boat traveled about one-half mile upriver before returning to the dock. The boat was reported to reach a speed of four mph moving upstream.

On December 21, 1833, Irish engineer John Howard Kyan received a UK patent for propelling ships by a jet of water ejected from the stern.

In April 1932, Italian engineer Secondo Campini demonstrated a pump-jet propelled boat in Venice, Italy. The boat achieved a top speed of 28 knots (32 mph; 52 km/h), a speed comparable to a boat with a conventional engine of similar output. The Italian Navy, who had funded the development of the boat, placed no orders but did veto the sale of the design outside of Italy. The first modern jetboat was developed by New Zealand engineer Sir William Hamilton in the mid 1950s.

== Uses ==
Pump-jets were once limited to high-speed pleasure craft (such as jet skis and jetboats) and other small vessels, but since 2000 the desire for high-speed vessels has increased and thus the pump-jet is gaining popularity on larger craft, military vessels and ferries. On these larger craft, they can be powered by diesel engines or gas turbines. Speeds of up to 40 knots (45 mph; 75 km/h) can be achieved with this configuration, even with a displacement hull.

Pump-jet powered ships are very maneuverable. Examples of ships using pumpjets are the Car Nicobar-class patrol vessels, the Hamina-class missile boats, Valour-class frigates, the Stena high-speed sea service ferries, the Royal Navy Swiftsure, Trafalgar and Astute-class submarines, as well as the United States Seawolf and Virginia-classes, and the Russian Borei-class submarines. They are also used by the United States littoral combat ships.

== See also ==
- Internal drive propulsion
- Personal water craft
- Wetbike
- Kitchen rudder
- Water rocket
- Chain boat - Water turbines
