= Kamewa =

Swedish pump jet manufacturer

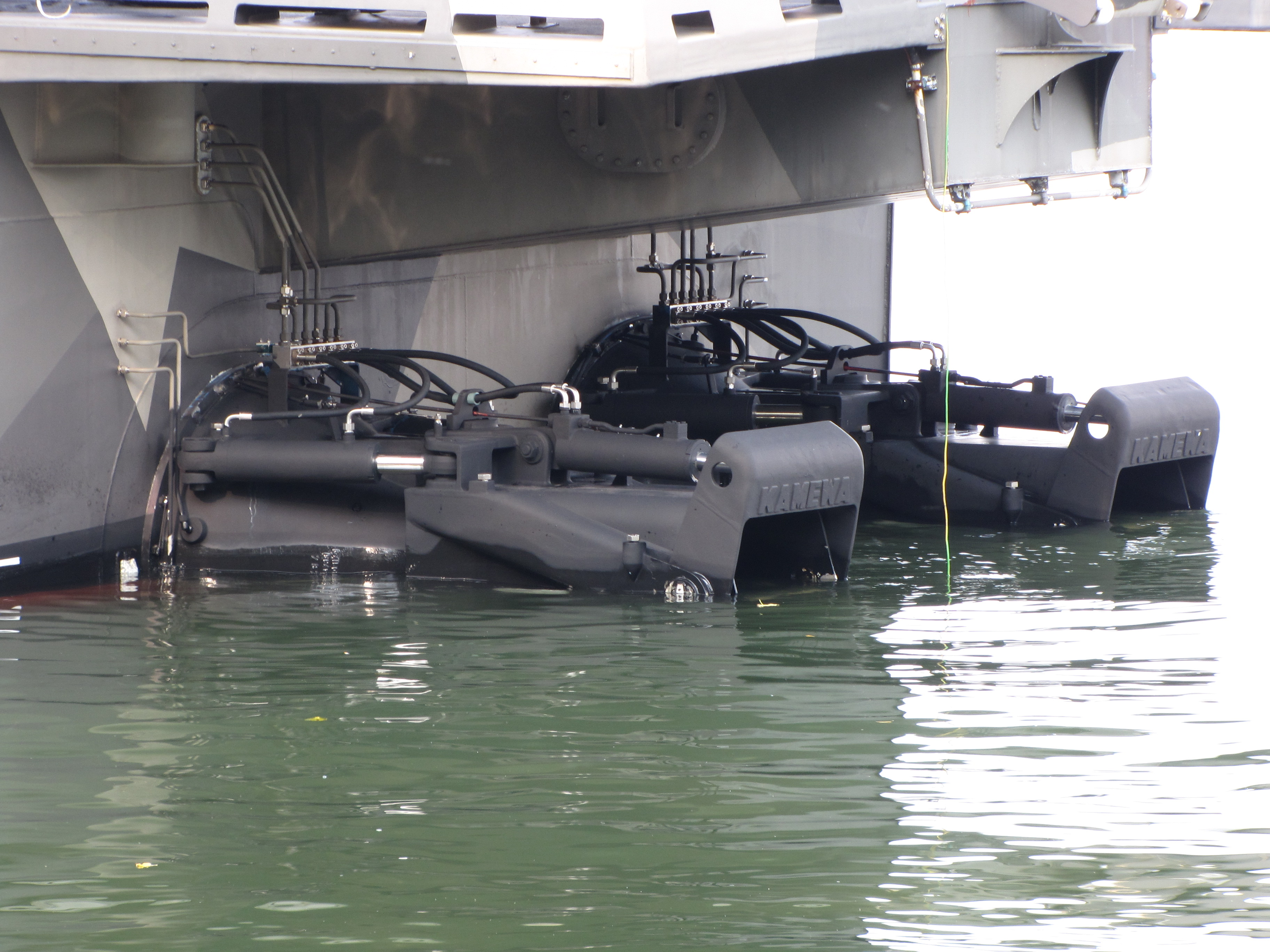
Rolls-Royce Kamewa 90SII waterjets of a Hamina-class missile boat

AB Karlstads Mekaniska Werkstad (trans. Karlstad Mechanical Works Ltd), known as Kamewa, was a Swedish manufacturing company in the city of Kristinehamn. Kamewa started as a brand name of the controllable-pitch propellers manufactured by KMW. KMW was founded in the city of Karlstad in 1860. KMW also manufactured pulp and paper machines for paper mills and hydro power turbines. Kamewa was acquired by the British company Vickers plc in 1986. In 1999, Rolls-Royce acquired Vickers. In 2019 the Commercial Marine part of Rolls-Royce was acquired by the Kongsberg group and integrated into its maritime division Kongsberg Maritime. The Swedish part of the business is now called Kongsberg Maritime Sweden AB and is based in Kristinehamn.

== Water jets ==
The Kamewa waterjets are still traded by Kongsberg Maritime under that name and are offered in five product lines in two product series.

Previous products from Kamewa has been the A-series, a mix flow pump in aluminum, the SII and P62 pumps in stainless steel and the Kamewa Advanced Propulsion Systems (APS) Waterjet developed specifically for the Volvo Penta diesel engine.

== Propellers ==
Kongsberg also produces Kamewa and Kamewa Ulstein propellers.

== U.S. Distributors ==
In 2016, Pacific Power Group was awarded the company's first distributorship to serve the Western U.S.
