= Jetpack Aviation =

- Industry: Personal aircraft
- Founded: 2016; 10 years ago
- Founder: David Mayman
- Headquarters: Los Angeles, California, United States
- Key people: Nelson Tyler
- Products: JB-9; JB-11; JB-12
- Website: jetpackaviation.com

Jetpack Aviation is a California-based company that produces jetpacks and other personal aircraft.

== Jetpacks ==
The company was founded by Australian inventor David Mayman, who had previously worked in software but had a longstanding interest in developing a jetpack. In the mid-2000s, he began working with Nelson Tyler, an engineer and inventor in Hollywood who had previously worked on the Bell Rocket Belt in the 1980s. The pair began work on a backpack-sized jet that would take off and land vertically that would meet popular expectations of the science fiction concept.

Their first device was the JB-9, a carbon-fiber corset that straps to the wearer's back that burns kerosene to propel them for about 10 minutes, based on their weight and flight conditions. In November 2015, Mayman publicly unveiled the device by flying around New York City's Statue of Liberty, including a pause and pirouette.

The company made its first sales to the military of a Southeast Asian country. The two JB-12s sold for $400,000 apiece. The company said the unnamed client was in the interest of dispatching medics for urgent emergency triage faster than a car or helicopter.
