= Space Rangers =

Space Ranger, or Space Rangers, can refer to:

== Technology ==
- Space Ranger (device), a propane powered flying platform.
- Hino Space Ranger, a commercial truck produced from 1999 to 2002.

== Dramas ==
- Rocky Jones, Space Ranger (1954), a U.S. science fiction (space opera) television serial that lasted for two seasons.
- Space Rangers (TV series) (1993), a television series about a small police force in 2104 at Planet Avalon's Fort Hope.
- Buzz Lightyear (from 1995), a space ranger in the Toy Story series.
- Power Rangers in Space (1998), which introduced the "Ranger" incarnation to the franchise.

== Comics ==
- Space Ranger (from 1958), a comic book hero by DC Comics.

== Video games ==
- Space Rangers (video game) (2002), a video game by the Russian game developer Elemental Games.
- Space Rangers 2: Dominators (2004), a sequel to the 2002 Space Rangers video game.
- Space Ranger, a name for Juno, a character in Overwatch 2

== Music ==
- "Space Ranger" (1976), song by Can from I Want More (Can song)
- "Space Ranger" (2008), song by Scandal (Japanese band)
