= Impossible Engineering =

US television series

- Genre: Science documentary
- Starring: Luke Bisby; Dan Dickrell; Ben Evans; Eric Lima; Jen Masengarb; Rhys Morgan; Kate Mulcay; Susie Sheehy; Amy Shira-Teitel; Andrew Steele
- Country of origin: United Kingdom
- Original language: English
- No. of seasons: 9
- No. of episodes: 62

Production
- Executive producers: Neil Edwards; Anthony Appell
- Producers: Gill Hennessey; Jonney Steven
- Production location: United Kingdom
- Running time: 60 minutes
- Production company: Twofour

Original release
- Network: Science Channel (US); Yesterday (UK); RMC Decouverte (France); Ici Explora (Canada); SVT (Sweden)
- Release: April 13, 2015 – present

Impossible Engineering is a television series produced for Discovery's Science Channel in the US, UKTV's Yesterday in the UK, RMC Decouverte in France, Societe Radio-Canada's Ici Explora in Canada, SVT in Sweden, Discovery Italy in Italy as well as with other broadcasters around the world. The first episode was released in April 2015.

Each episode focuses on one modern-day engineering achievement, with historical segments about the engineering pioneers who helped pave the way for present-day engineers. Each one-hour-long programme details how giant structures, record-beating buildings, and the world's most cutting-edge ships, trains, and planes are built and work using 3D graphics, archives, and specially shot footage.

As of January 2020, five series of Impossible Engineering have been produced. In addition, two series of a spin-off called Impossible Railways in most territories and Impossible Engineering: Extreme Railroads in the US have been produced.

The series is produced by British independent production company Twofour Broadcast.

== Episodes of Impossible Engineering ==
This is a listing of every episode of Impossible Engineering broadcast by UKTV to date. The episode titles shown here are the titles that UKTV use and are listed on their website. Other broadcasters may have different titles for each episode.

=== Series 1 ===
Series 1 premiered in April 2015.

No. in season	No. overall	Title	Featured	Type
1	1	"Mega Bridge"	Rio–Antirrio Bridge	Cable-stayed bridge
2	2	"Ultimate Warship"	HMS Queen Elizabeth	Aircraft carrier
3	3	"Skyscraper Of The Future"	Shanghai Tower	Skyscraper
4	4	"Ultimate Airport"	Kansai International Airport	International airport
5	5	"World's Fastest Train"	Shanghai Transrapid	Maglev train
6	6	"World's Largest Plane"	Airbus A380	Airliner

=== Series 2 ===
This series premiered from March 2017 in the US.

No. in season	No. overall	Title	Featured	Type
1	7	"NASA's Rocket To Mars"	Orion Space Craft	Space capsule
2	8	"Millau Viaduct"	Millau Viaduct	Cable-stayed bridge
3	9	"AT&T Stadium"	AT&T Stadium	Retractable roof stadium
4	10	"Three Gorges Dam"	Three Gorges Dam	Gravity dam
5	11	"Gotthard Base Tunnel"	Gotthard Base Tunnel	Railway tunnel
6	12	"Oasis-Class Cruise Ships"	Oasis-class cruise ship	Cruise ship
7	13	"US Navy's Super Submarine"	Virginia-class submarine	Attack submarine
8	14	"The Glass Skyscraper"	The Shard	Skyscraper

=== Series 3 ===
This series premiered from January 2019 in the US.

No. in season	No. overall	Title
1	15	"500m Aperture Telescope"
2	16	"Panama Canal Overhaul"
3	17	"The Pioneering Spirit"
4	18	"Halley IV Research Station"
5	19	"Crossrail"
6	20	"The Invincible Tower"
7	21	"International Space Station"
8	22	"Littoral combat ship Class"
9	23	"Inside the Tesla Factory"
10	24	"Airlander 10 Airship"
11	25	"Record-Breaking Rollercoaster"
12	26	"Monster Oil Rig"

=== Series 4 ===
This series premiered from January 2020 in both the US and the UK. In the US this series was split down into smaller series and broadcast throughout the year.

No. in season	No. overall	Title
1	27	"Chernobyl's Toughest Fix"
2	28	"London Array"
3	29	"Hudson Yards"
4	30	"Ford Class Aircraft Carrier"
5	31	"Underwater Mega Tower"
6	32	"Abrams Tank"
7	33	"Personal Jet Suit"
8	34	"The 1,000mph car"
9	35	"Black Pearl Sailing Yacht"
10	36	"Himalayan Mega Train"
11	37	"South To The North Water Diversion"

=== Series 5 ===
Series 5 came out in 2020.

No. in season	No. overall	Title
1	38	"Dubai's Impossible Island"
2	39	"World's Toughest Tunnels"
3	40	"F-35 Fighter Jet"
4	41	"NYC Mega Tower"
5	42	"World's Biggest Airport"
6	43	"Spy Plane Declassified"
7	44	"World's Highest Bridge"
8	45	"Conquering Avalanche Country"

=== Series 6 ===
No. in season	No. overall	Title
1	46	"World's Largest Plane: Stratolaunch"
2	47	"World's Strongest Ship"
3	48	"Texas Super Skyscraper"
4	49	"Secrets Of The Supertanker"

=== Series 7 ===
No. in season	No. overall	Title
1	50	"Kings Of The Battlefield"

== Episodes of Impossible Railways ==
=== Series 1 ===
No. in season	No. overall	Title
1	51	"Deadliest Trains"
2	52	"World's Fastest Trains"
3	53	"Mega City Trains"
4	54	"Trains Of The Abyss"
5	55	"Monster Mountain Trains"
6	56	"Trains Of Deadly Seas"

=== Series 2 ===
No. in season	No. overall	Title
1	57	"Beasts Of The Bayou"
2	58	"The Trains That Built America"
3	59	"Monster Of The Andes"
4	60	"Himalaya Mega Bridge"
5	61	"NYC Monster Train"
6	62	"Rise Of The Hyperloop"
