= Jet pack =

Device using jets to propel the wearer

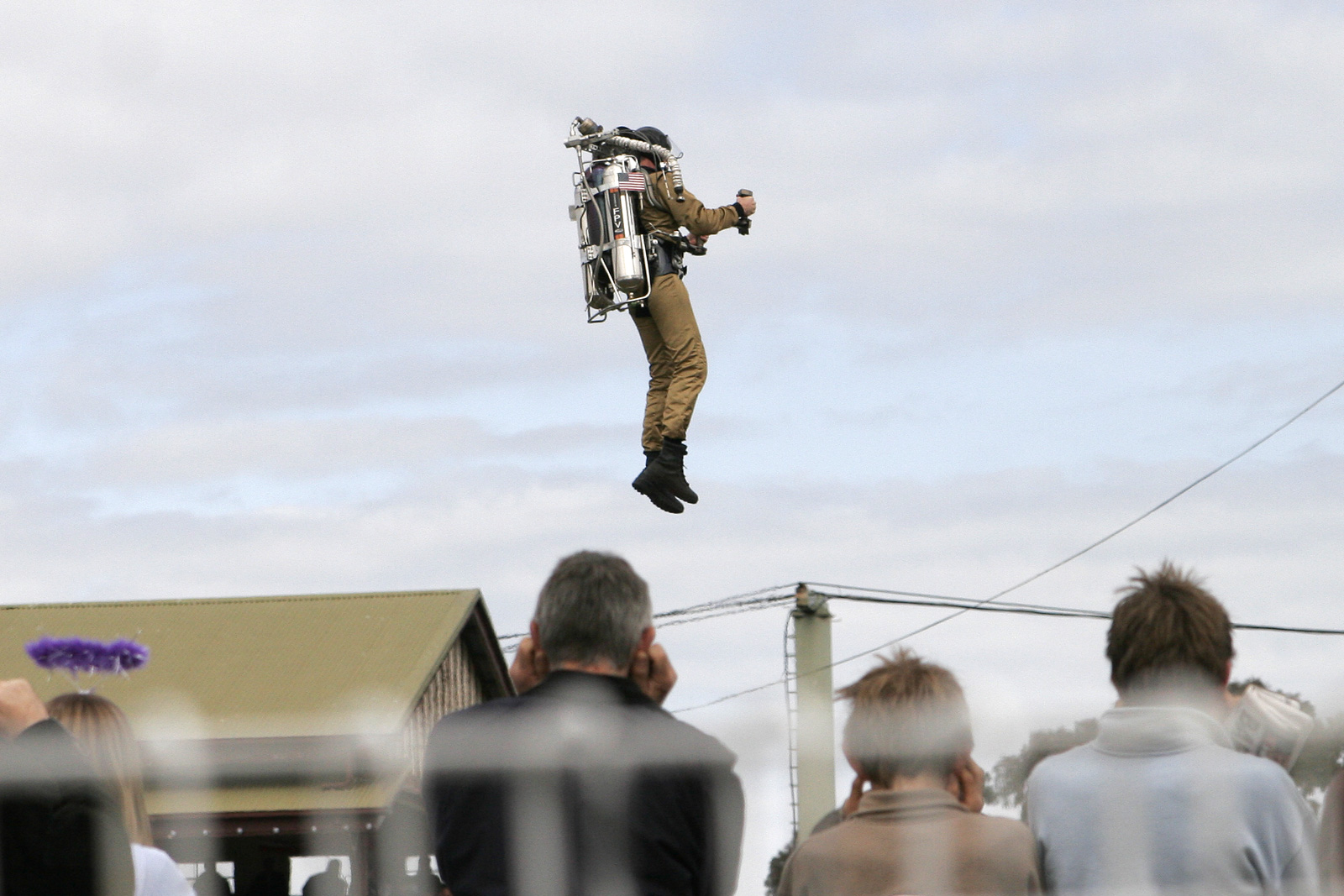
Dan Schlund flying in a jet pack (Rocketbelt) in 2005

A jet pack, rocket belt, rocket pack or flight pack is a device worn as a backpack which uses jets to propel the wearer through the air. The concept has been present in science fiction for almost a century and the first working experimental devices were demonstrated in the 1960s.

Jet packs have been developed using a variety of mechanisms, but their uses are limited because of factors including the Earth's atmosphere, gravity, the low energy density of extreme fuels, and the human body not being suited to flight, so they are principally used for stunts.

A practical use for the jet pack has been in extra-vehicular activities for astronauts because of the weightlessness and lack of friction-generating atmosphere in orbit. The term jet suit is used for a system incorporating a jet pack and associated jets attached to the arms to increase manoeuvrability (e.g. the Daedalus Flight Pack).

== Overview ==
In the most general terms, a jet pack is a wearable device which allows the user to fly by providing thrust. With the exception of use in a microgravity environment, this thrust must be upwards so as to overcome the force of gravity, and must be enough to overcome the weight of the user, the jet pack itself and its fuel. This necessarily requires the jet pack to continually push mass in a downwards direction.

While some designs have power and/or mass supplied from an external, ground-based source, untethered flight requires all of a flight's fuel to be carried within the pack. This results in problems relating to the overall mass ratio, which limits the maximum flight time to a few minutes, rather than the sustained flight envisaged in science fiction.

== Rocket pack ==
=== Gunpowder-fueled rocket pack ===
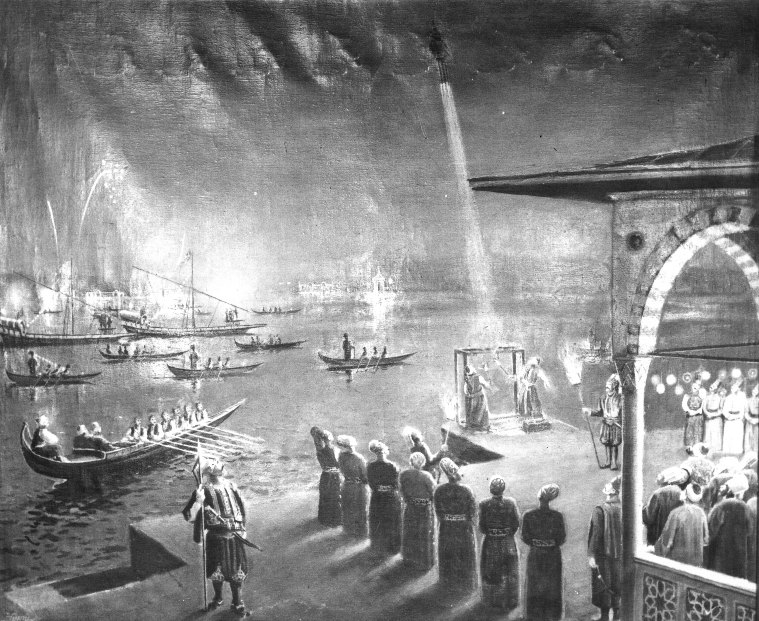
Lagâri jetpack in 1632

In 1632, Evliya Çelebi recorded a story about an Ottoman artist and engineer named Lagâri Hasan Çelebi who reportedly flew a platform with seven rockets strapped to it. When the fuel ran out, Lagari jumped out with a winged glider device and landed in the Sea of Marmara. The sultan awarded him a bag of 70 silver coins and registered him as a sipahi, a heavy cavalry class soldier in the Ottoman Army. This figure existed but the event is physically impossible.

=== Liquid-fueled rocket pack ===
==== Andreyev: oxygen-and-methane, with wings ====
The first pack design was developed in 1919 by the Russian inventor Alexander Fedorovich Andreev. The project was well regarded by Nikolai Rynin and technology historians Yu. V. Biryukov and S. V. Golotyuk. Later it was issued a patent but apparently was not built or tested. It was oxygen-and-methane-powered (likeliest a rocket) with wings each roughly 1 m (3 feet) long.

=== Hydrogen peroxide–powered rocket packs ===
A hydrogen peroxide–powered engine is based on the decomposition reaction of hydrogen peroxide. Nearly pure (90% in the Bell Rocket Belt) hydrogen peroxide is used. Pure hydrogen peroxide is relatively stable, but in contact with a catalyst (for example, silver) it decomposes into a mixture of superheated steam and oxygen in less than 1/10 millisecond, increasing in volume 5,000 times: 2 H_{2}O_{2} → 2 H_{2}O + O_{2}. The reaction is exothermic, i.e., accompanied by the liberation of much heat (about 2,500 kJ/kg [1,100 BTU/lb]), forming in this case a steam-gas mixture at 740 °C [1,360 °F]. This hot gas is used exclusively as the reaction mass and is fed directly to one or more jet nozzles.

The great disadvantage is the limited operating time. The jet of steam and oxygen can provide significant thrust from advanced rockets, but the jet has a relatively low exhaust velocity and hence a poor specific impulse. Currently, such rocket belts can only fly for about 30 seconds (because of the limited amount of fuel the user can carry unassisted).

A more conventional bipropellant could more than double the specific impulse. However, although the exhaust gases from the peroxide-based engine are very hot, they are still significantly cooler than those generated by alternative propellants. Using a peroxide-based propellant greatly reduces the risk of a fire/explosion which would cause severe injury to the operator.

In contrast to, for example, turbojet engines, which mainly expel atmospheric air to produce thrust, rocket packs are far simpler to build than devices using turbojets. The classical rocket pack construction of Wendell Moore can be made under workshop conditions, given good engineering training and a high level of tool-making craftsmanship.

The main disadvantages of this type of rocket pack are:

- Short duration of flight (a maximum of around 30 seconds).
- The high expense of the peroxide propellant.
- The inherent dangers of flying below minimum parachute altitude, and hence without any safety equipment to protect the operator if there is an accident or malfunction.
- Safely learning how to fly it, given that there are no dual-control training versions.
- The sheer difficulty of manually flying such a device.

These circumstances limit the sphere of the application of rocket packs to spectacular public demonstration flights, i.e., stunts; for example, a flight was arranged in the course of the opening ceremony of the 1984 Summer Olympic Games in Los Angeles, USA.

==== Justin Capra's flying backpack ====
Justin Capră claimed that he invented a "flying rucksack" (Romanian: rucsac zburator) in 1956 in Romania, and, without arousing any apparent interest, informed the American Embassy of his idea. However it was tested by Henri Coandă, a paratrooper who crashed it the first time but managed the second after he advised to change the fuel and improve on the design. In 1962 a backpack was created at Bell Laboratories, following Justin Capră's prototype. The backpack is now displayed in a museum.

==== Jump Belt ====
In 1958, Garry Burdett and Alexander Bohr, Thiokol Corporation engineers, created a Jump Belt which they named Project Grasshopper. Thrust was created by high-pressure compressed nitrogen. Two small nozzles were affixed to the belt and directed vertically downward. The wearer of the belt could open a valve, letting out nitrogen from the gas cylinder through the nozzles, which tossed him upward to a height of 7 m (23 ft). While leaning forward, it was possible with the aid of the jump belt's thrust to run at 45 to 50 km/h (28 to 31 mph). Later, Burdett and Bohr tested a hydrogen peroxide–powered version. The jump belt was demonstrated by a serviceman in action, but as no financing was forthcoming, there was no further testing.

==== Aeropack ====
In 1959 Aerojet General Corporation won a U.S. Army contract to devise a jet pack or rocket pack. At the start of 1960 Richard Peoples made his first tethered flight with his Aeropack.

==== U.S. Army interest ====
Transport studies of the U.S. Army Transportation Research Command (TRECOM) determined that personal jet devices could have diverse uses: for reconnaissance, crossing rivers, amphibious landing, accessing steep mountain slopes, overcoming minefields, tactical maneuvering, etc. The concept was named "Small Rocket Lift Device", SRLD.

Within the framework of this concept, the administration concluded a contract with the Aerojet General company in 1959 to research the possibility of designing an SRLD suitable for army purposes. Aerojet came to the conclusion that the version with the engine running on hydrogen peroxide was most suitable. However, it soon became known to the military that engineer Wendell F. Moore of the Bell Aerosystems company had for several years been carrying out experiments to make a personal jet device. After becoming acquainted with his work, servicemen during August 1960 decided to commission Bell Aerosystems with developing an SRLD. Wendell Moore was appointed chief project engineer.

==== Bell Textron Rocket Belt ====
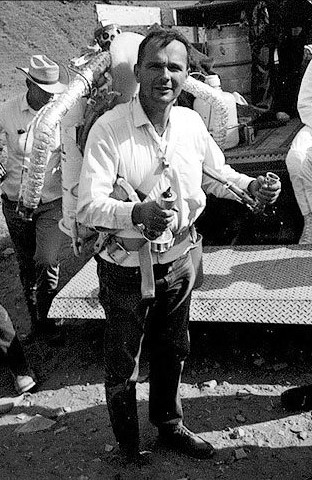
Astrogeologist Gene Shoemaker wearing a Bell Rocket Belt while training astronauts

In 1960, the Bell Rocketbelt was presented to the public. The jet of gas was provided by a hydrogen peroxide–powered rocket, but the jet could also be powered by a turbojet engine, a ducted fan, or other kinds of rockets powered by solid fuel, liquid fuel or compressed gas (usually nitrogen).

This is the oldest known type of jet pack or rocket pack. One Bell Rocket Belt is on display at the Smithsonian Institution's National Air and Space Museum annex, the Steven F. Udvar-Hazy Center, located near Dulles Airport.

==== RB-2000 Rocket Belt ====
This was a successor to the Bell Rocket Belt.

==== Bell Pogo ====
The Bell Pogo was a small rocket-powered platform that two people could ride on. Its design used features from the Bell Rocket Belt.

==== Powerhouse Productions Rocketbelt ====
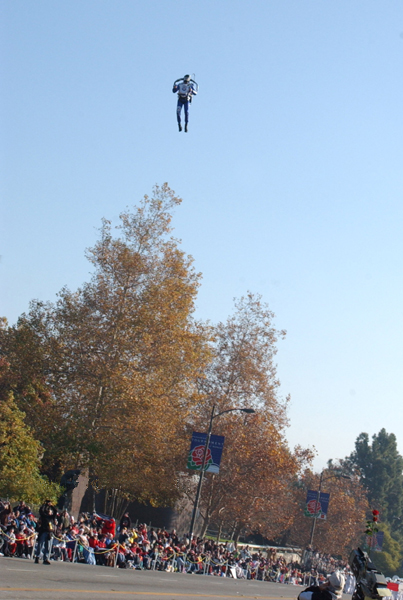
Rocketbelt pilot Dan Schlund at the 2007 Rose Parade

More commonly known as "The Rocketman", Powerhouse Productions, owned and operated by Kinnie Gibson, manufactures the 30-second flying Rocketbelt (June 1994) and organizes Rocketbelt performances. Since 1983 Powerhouse Productions has performed show flights in over 40 countries such as the Carnival in Rio de Janeiro, Super Bowls, the Rose Parade, Daytona 500, and the Michael Jackson Dangerous World Tour, as well as many television shows including Walker, Texas Ranger, The Fall Guy and NCIS. Powerhouse Rocketbelt pilots include stuntman Kinnie Gibson, Eric Scott and Dan Schlund.

The Rocketman

After the death of Kinnie Gibson, Rocketbelt pilot Dan Schlund purchased the namesake and equipment to continue the tradition of The Rocketman. Since then he published a memoir titled "The Last Rocketman" which then was produced in a documentary under the same title.

==== Jetpack International ====
Jetpack International made three models of wingless jet packs. The company stated that the Jet Pack H2O2 could fly 152 meters, using hydrogen peroxide fuel for its rocket engine. It was flown for 34 seconds in Central Park on the 9 April 2007 episode of the Today Show and sold for $150,000. Their H_{2}O_{2} jet pack was for demonstration only, not for sale, but the company stated that it could fly 457 meters, also with the hydrogen peroxide rocket engine. The T-73 was expected to fly up to 18 meters using Jet-A fuel and a jet engine, and to sell for $200,000.

==== Later technology ====
At the TechCrunch Disrupt conference in 2014, Astro Teller, head of Google X (Google's research laboratory), said they investigated jet packs but found them too inefficient to be practical, with fuel consumption as high as 940 L/100 km (1/4 mpg_{‑US}), and were as loud as a motorcycle, so they decided not to pursue developing them.

In recent years, the rocket pack has become popular among enthusiasts, and some have built them for themselves. The pack's basic construction is rather simple, but its flying capability depends on two key parts: the gas generator, and the thrust control valve. The rocket packs being built today are largely based on the research and inventions of Wendell Moore at Bell Helicopter.

One of the largest stumbling blocks that would-be rocket pack builders have faced is the difficulty of obtaining concentrated hydrogen peroxide, which is no longer produced by many chemical companies. The few companies that produce high-concentration hydrogen peroxide only sell to large corporations or governments, forcing some amateurs and professionals to set up their own hydrogen peroxide distillation installations. High-concentration hydrogen peroxide for rocket belts was produced by Peroxide Propulsion (Gothenburg, Sweden) from 2004 to 2010, but after a serious accident Peroxide Propulsion stopped making it.

=== Government ===
==== Space ====
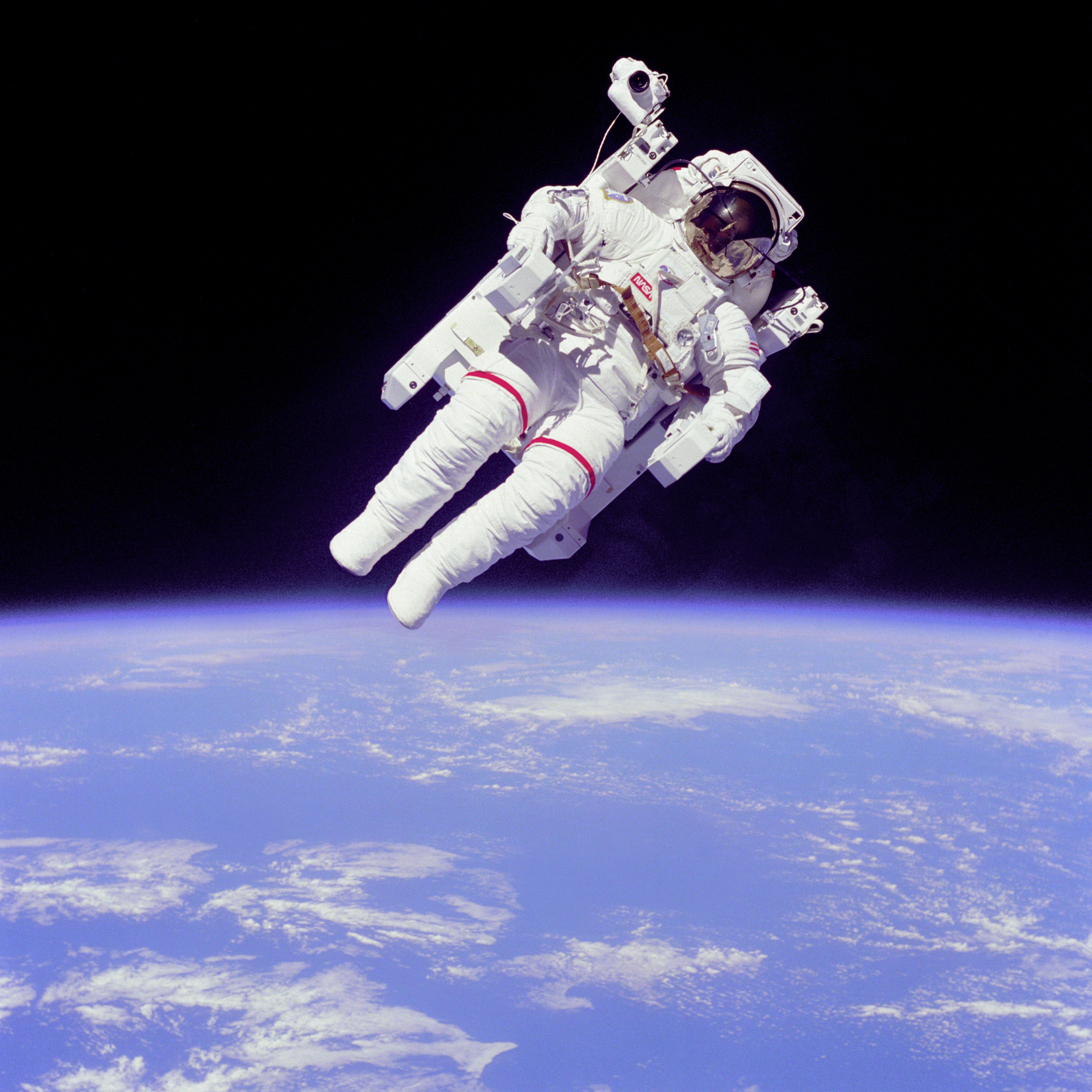
Bruce McCandless II operating the Manned Maneuvering Unit

Rocket packs can be useful for spacewalks. One example is the Manned Maneuvering Unit (or MMU), which weighed approximately 300 pounds and was affixed with two propellant tanks that supplied 24 small thrusters with 40 pounds of high-pressured gaseous nitrogen. It was first used by astronauts Bruce McCandless and Bob Stewart in February 1984. While near Earth a jet pack has to produce a g-force of at least 1 g (a smaller g-force, providing only some deviation from free fall is of little use here), for excursions outside a free falling spaceship, a small g-force providing a small deviation from free fall is useful. Hence much less delta-v is consumed per unit time, and not during the whole EVA. With only small amounts of thrust needed, safety and temperature are more manageable than in the atmosphere in Earth's gravity field.

Nevertheless, it is currently worn to be used only in case of emergency: the Simplified Aid For EVA Rescue (SAFER).

== Rocket chair ==
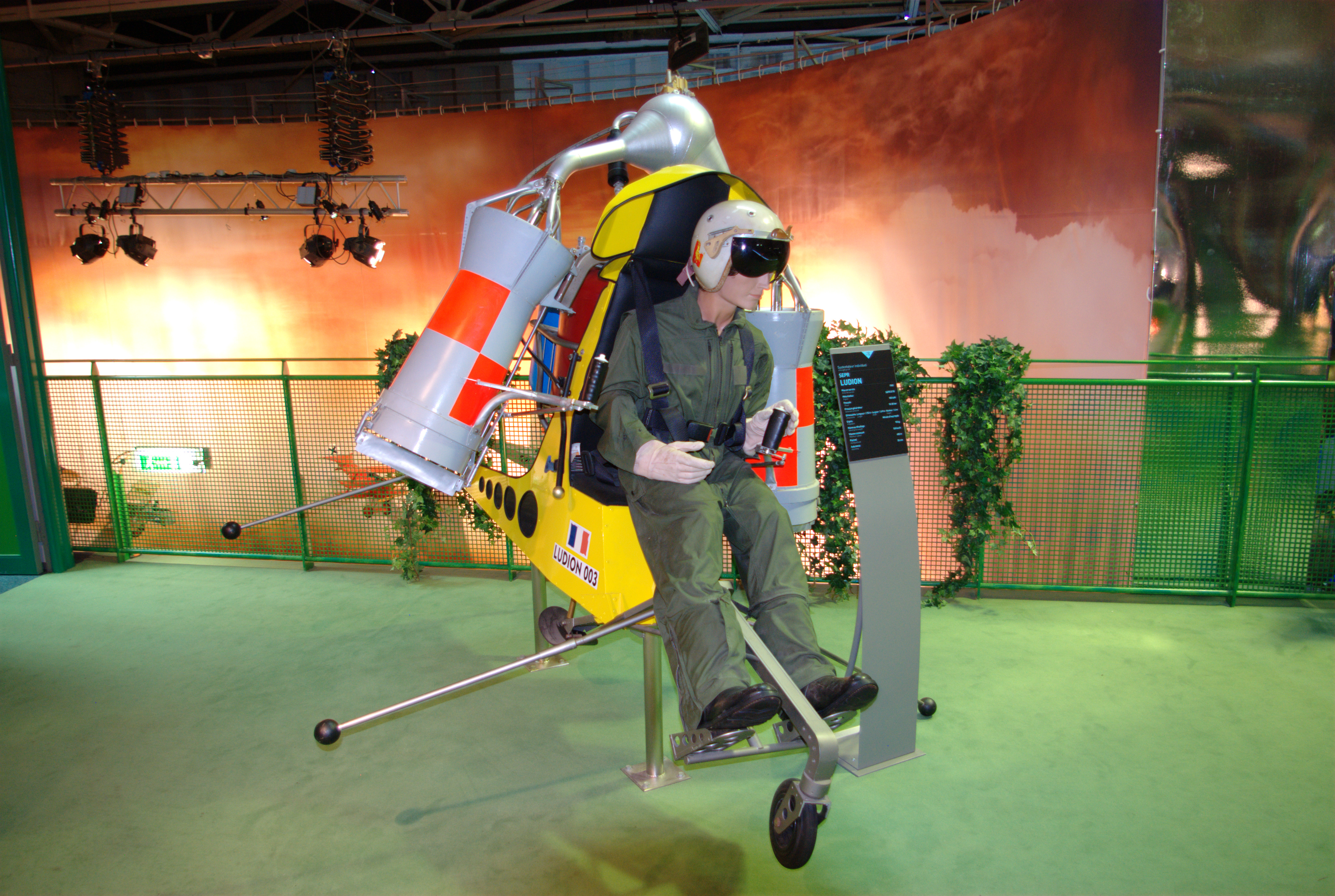
The Aérospatiale Ludion is an example of a rocket chair.

A rocket chair is similar to a rocket pack, but the user remains in a sitting position on a lightweight chair-like structure. Such a device was prototyped in the 1960s by North American Rockwell for the Lunar Flight Unit concept, a never-launched part of the Apollo moon landing program. A homemade design was later produced by celebrity "rocket man" Ky Michaelson.

Wan Hu is a possibly legendary Chinese figure who purportedly flew into space on a chair powered by rockets.

== Turbojet packs ==
Packs with a turbojet engine are fueled with traditional kerosene-based jet fuel. They have higher efficiency, greater height and a duration of flight of many minutes, but they are complex in construction and very expensive. Only one working model of this pack was made; it underwent flight tests in the 1960s and at present it no longer flies. Jet packs and rocket packs have much better flight time on a tankful of fuel if they have wings like an aeroplane's.

=== Bell Jet Flying Belt: wingless ===
In 1965 Bell Aerosystems concluded a new contract with the Defense Advanced Research Projects Agency (DARPA) to develop a jet pack with a turbojet engine. This project was called the "Jet Flying Belt", or simply the "Jet Belt". Wendell Moore and John K. Hulbert, a specialist in gas turbines, worked to design a new turbojet pack. Williams Research Corporation (now Williams International) in Walled Lake, Michigan, designed and built a new turbojet engine to Bell's specifications in 1969. It was called the WR19, had a rated thrust of 1,900 newtons (430 lbf) and weighed 31 kg (68 lb). The Jet Belt first flew free on 7 April 1969 at the Niagara Falls Municipal Airport. Pilot Robert Courter flew about 100 m (330 ft) in a circle at an altitude of 7 m (23 ft), reaching a speed of 45 km/h (28 mph). The following flights were longer, up to 5 minutes. Theoretically, this new pack could fly for 25 minutes at velocities up to 135 km/h (84 mph).

In spite of successful tests, the U.S. Army lost interest. The pack was complex to maintain and too heavy. Landing with its weight on their back was hazardous to the pilot, and catastrophic loss of a turbine blade could have been lethal.

Thus, the Bell Jet Flying Belt remained an experimental model. On 29 May 1969, Wendell Moore died of complications from a heart attack he had suffered six months earlier, and work on the turbojet pack ended. Bell sold the sole version of the "Bell pack", together with the patents and technical documentation, to Williams Research Corporation. This pack is now in the Williams International company museum.

The "Jet Belt" used a small turbofan engine which was mounted vertically, with its air intake downward. Intake air was divided into two flows. One flow went into the combustion chamber, the other flow bypassed the engine, then mixed with the hot turbine gases, cooling them and protecting the pilot from the high temperatures generated. In the upper part of the engine the exhaust was divided and entered two pipes which led to jet nozzles. The construction of the nozzles made it possible to move the jet to any side. Kerosene fuel was stored in tanks beside the engine. Control of the turbojet pack was similar to the rocket pack, but the pilot could not tilt the entire engine. Maneuvering was by deflecting the nozzles. By inclining levers, the pilot could move the jets of both nozzles forward, back, or sideways. The pilot rotated left/right by turning the left handle. The right handle governed the engine thrust. The jet engine was started with the aid of a powder cartridge. While testing this starter, a mobile starter on a special cart was used. There were instruments to control the power of the engine, and a portable radio to connect and transmit telemetry data to ground-based engineers. On top of the pack was a standard auxiliary landing parachute; it was effective only when opened at altitudes above 20 m (66 ft). This engine was later the basis for the propulsion units of Tomahawk and other cruise missiles.

=== Visa Parviainen's jet-assisted wingsuit ===
On 25 October 2005 in Lahti, Finland, Visa Parviainen jumped from a hot air balloon in a wingsuit with two small turbojet jet engines attached to his feet. Each turbojet provided approximately 160 N (16 kgf) of thrust and ran on kerosene (Jet A-1) fuel. Parviainen apparently achieved approximately 30 seconds of horizontal flight with no noticeable loss of altitude.

=== Yves Rossy's jet wingpack ===
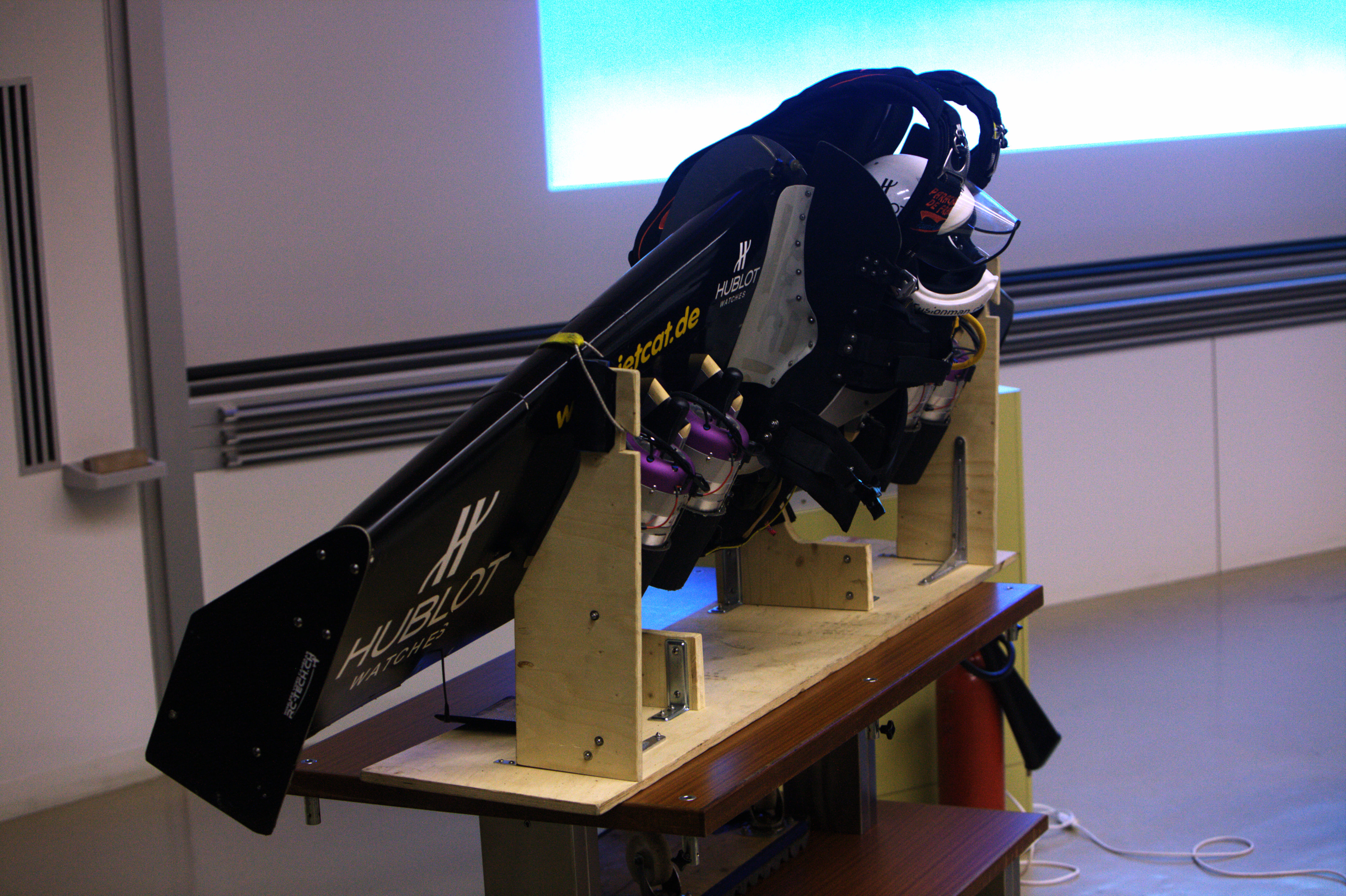
Rossy's wing showing the four purple and silver jet-engines mounted close to the centre

Swiss ex-military and commercial pilot Yves Rossy developed and built a winged pack with rigid aeroplane-type carbon-fiber wings spanning about 2.4 m (8 ft) and four small kerosene-burning Jetcat P400 jet engines underneath; these engines are large versions of a type designed for model aeroplanes. He wears a heat-resistant suit similar to that of a firefighter or racing driver to protect him from the hot jet exhaust. Similarly, to further protect the wearer, the engines are modified by adding a carbon fiber heat shield extending the jet nozzle around the exhaust tail.

Rossy claims to be "the first person to gain altitude and maintain a stable horizontal flight thanks to aerodynamic carbon foldable wings", which are folded by hinges at their midpoint. After being lifted to altitude by a plane, he ignites the engines just before he exits the plane with the wings folded. The wings unfold while in free-fall, and he then can fly horizontally for several minutes, landing with the help of a parachute. He achieves true controlled flight using his body and a hand throttle to maneuver.

Jet wingsuits use small turbojets, but differ from other aircraft in that the fuselage and flight control surfaces consist of a human.

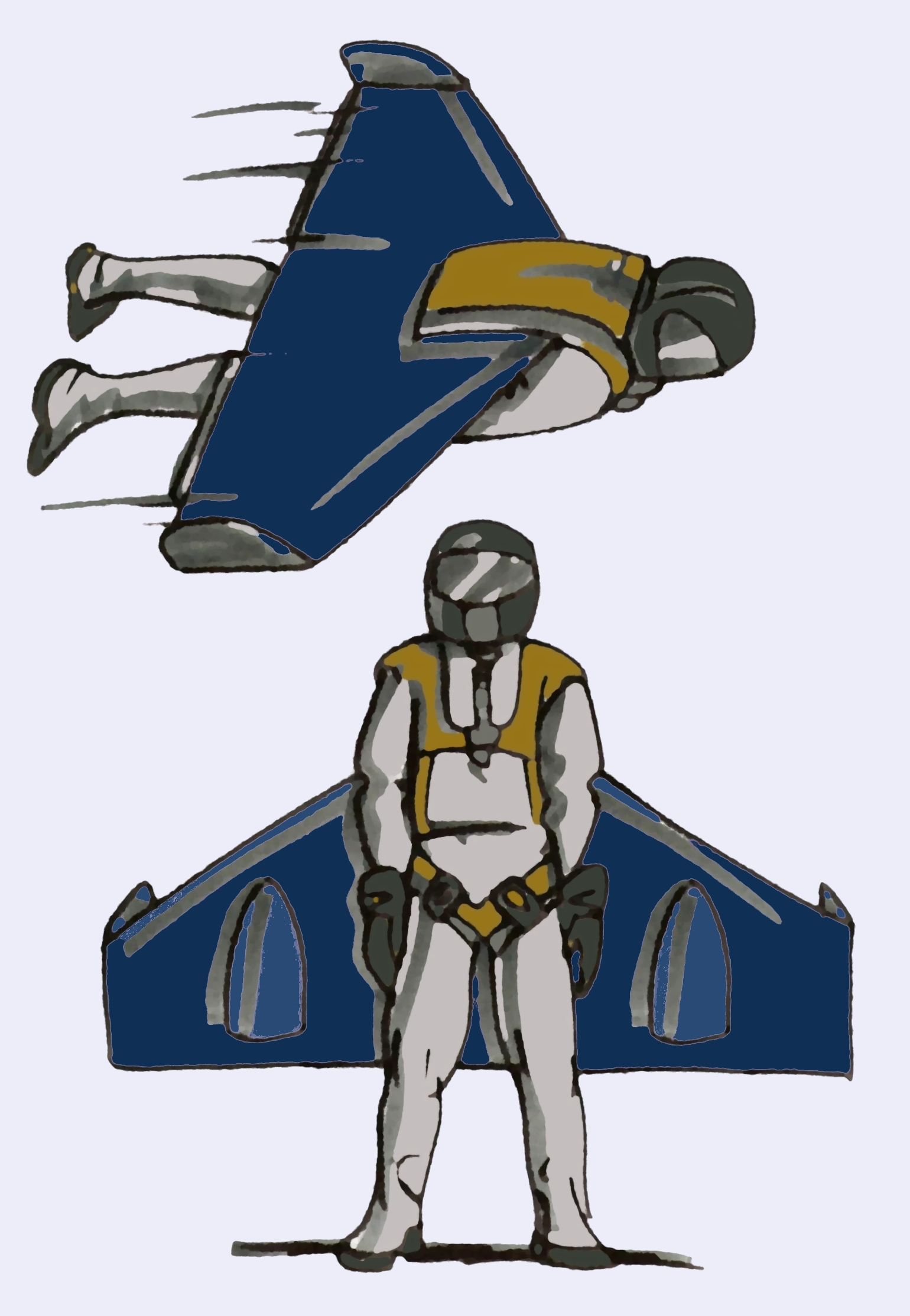
A jet-powered wingpack

The system is said by Rossy to be highly responsive and reactive in flight, to the point where he needs to closely control his head, arm and leg movements to avoid an uncontrolled spin. The engines on the wing must be aligned precisely during set-up, also to prevent instability. An electronic starter system ensures that all four engines ignite simultaneously. In the event of a spin, the wing unit can be detached from the pilot, and pilot and wing unit descend to Earth separately, each with a parachute.

Since 2007, Rossy has conducted some of his flight tests from a private airfield, Skydive Empuriabrava, in Empuriabrava (Girona, Costa Brava), Spain. Rossy's jet pack was exhibited on 18 April 2008 on the opening day of the 35th Exhibition of Inventions at Geneva. Rossy and his sponsors spent over $190,000 to build the device. His first successful trial flight was on 24 June 2004 near Geneva, Switzerland. Rossy has made more than 30 powered flights since. In November 2006 he flew with a later version of his jet pack. On 14 May 2008 he made a successful 6-minute flight from the town of Bex near Lake Geneva. He exited a Pilatus Porter at 2,300 m (7,500 ft) with his jet pack. It was the first public demonstration before the world's press. He made seemingly effortless loops from one side of the Rhone valley to the other and rose 790 m (2,600 ft).

It has been claimed that the military was impressed and asked for prototypes for the powered wings, but that Rossy kindly refused the request stating that the device was only intended for aviation enthusiasts.

On 26 September 2008, Rossy successfully flew across the English Channel from Calais, France, to Dover, England, in 9 minutes, 7 seconds. His speed reached 300 km/h (190 mph) during the crossing and was moving at 200 km/h (120 mph) when he deployed the parachute. Since then he has—in several flights—managed to fly in a formation with three military jets and cross the Grand Canyon, but he failed to fly across the Strait of Gibraltar—he made an emergency landing in the water.

Rossy appeared in a February 2012 episode of Top Gear (S18 E5) where he raced against a Skoda rally car driven by Toni Gardemeister with Richard Hammond as a passenger. The race started with the rally car launching down the rally course while Rossy and his support helicopter climbed to reach altitude, upon which he dropped and ignited his engines and followed the course to race the car. Periodical smoke dashes (such as those used by sky-writers or air force display teams) were used to track his progress. In the onboard footage of Rossy flying the tight and twisty course, one can see how he uses his body parts as control surfaces to perform various maneuvers.

On 13 October 2015 a show flight was performed in Dubai. Two jet packs operated by Rossy and Vince Reffet flew in formation with an Airbus A380 jetliner.

=== Troy Hartman: jet pack and parafoil ===
In 2008 Troy Hartman started designing a wingless jet pack with two turbojet motors strapped to his back; later he added a parafoil as a wing.

=== jetpack: jet pack with rigid wings ===
As of 2013 Fritz Unger in Germany is developing a jet pack called Skyflash with rigid wings about 3.4 m (11 ft) wingspan and two turbojets designed to run on diesel fuel. It is designed for takeoff from the ground using four undercarriage wheels on the front of his chest and abdomen.

=== JetPack Aviation: wingless jet pack ===
On 3 November 2015, Jetpack Aviation demonstrated the JB-9 in Upper New York Bay in front of the Statue of Liberty. The JB-9 carries 4.5 kilograms (10 lb) of kerosene fuel that burns through two vectored thrust AMT Nike jet engines at a rate of 3.8 litres (1 US gallon) per minute for up to ten minutes of flying time, depending on pilot weight. Weight of fuel is a consideration, but it is reported to start with 150 m (500 ft) per minute climb rate that doubles as the fuel burns off. While this model has been limited to 102 km/h (55 knots), the prototype of the JB-10 is reported to fly at over 200 km/h (110 kn).

This is a true jet pack: a backpack that provides jet-powered flight. Most of the volume is the fuel tank, with twin turbine jet engines gimbal-mounted on each side. The control system is identical to the Bell Rocket Belt: tilting the handgrips vectors the thrust – left-right & forward-back – by moving the engines; twisting left hand moves two nozzle skirts for yaw; twisting the right hand counterclockwise increases throttle. Jetpack Aviation was started by Australian businessman David Mayman with the technical know-how coming from Nelson Tyler, prolific inventor of helicopter-mounted camera stabilizers and one of the engineers that worked on the Bell Rocketbelt that was used in the 1984 Olympics.

The company now makes two Jetpack models, the JB-10 and the JB-11. They are similar to the JB-9, with upgraded electronics. They both use kerosene/diesel turbojet engines. The JB-10 is designed with two large 200 lb. thrust engines and is described as having an 8-minute flight time, while the slightly longer duration JB-11 has a 10-minute flight time and uses eight smaller 90 lb. thrust engines.

=== Flyboard Air ===
Flyboard Air, invented by Franky Zapata, allows flight up to 3,000 metres (10,000 ft) and can reach 150 km/h (93 mph). It also has 10 minutes autonomy. Zapata participated with his invention during the 2019 Bastille Day military parade. Three weeks later, he crossed the English Channel with his device in 22 minutes, including a shipboard refueling midway.

=== Daedalus Flight Pack ===
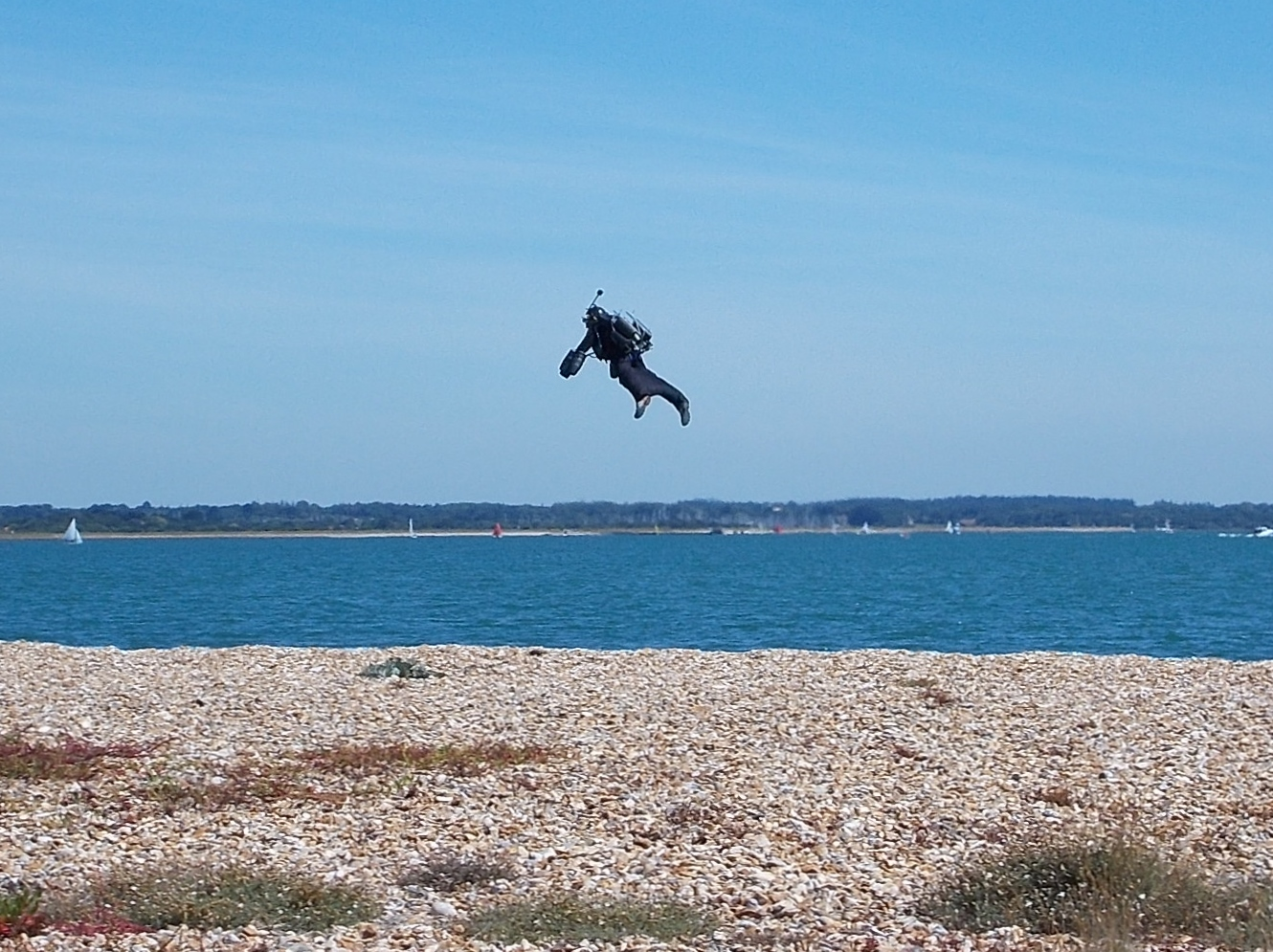
Richard Browning flying the "Daedalus" jet suit at Hurst Spit, Hampshire, England in 2019

This particular innovation saw two jets attached to the back of an exoskeleton, worn by the operator. At the same time, two additional jets were added to the arms, and could be moved with the arms to control movement. It was devised by Richard Browning of Gravity Industries. In September 2020 it was reported that the Great North Air Ambulance (GNAA) service was considering using this jet suit to enable paramedics to reach casualties in the mountainous Lake District, and by March 2022 the operational director of the GNAA, Andy Mawson, had been trained to fly and the service hoped to start using jet suits in summer 2022, although as of 2026 this has not actually occurred.

=== iJETPACK Aeronautics: IJ6180 Jetsuit ===
In 2021, Australian aerospace company, iJETPACK Aeronautics developed a six mini-turbojet wearable flight system ("Jetsuit") producing up to 180 kg thrust distributed across three units on the arms and back. Its R&D and flight operations are supported by NSW Government, Dainese, Specialist Helicopters and Australian Motorsport Innovation Precinct. iJETPACK's founder, Jennie Bewes is a commercially licensed helicopter pilot that specialises in Safety & Regulatory Compliance and a former corporate innovation leader known for introducing novel products and services such as the World's first big-data insights tool. iJETPACK's engineer, David 'Dakka' Clarke is a former defence (RAAF) engineer who single-handedly built a hydrogen-peroxide fuelled "Rocketbelt" which he flew at Brisbane's EKKA show in 2013, Royal Adelaide Show in 2014 and in China 2018.

== Hydroflight ==
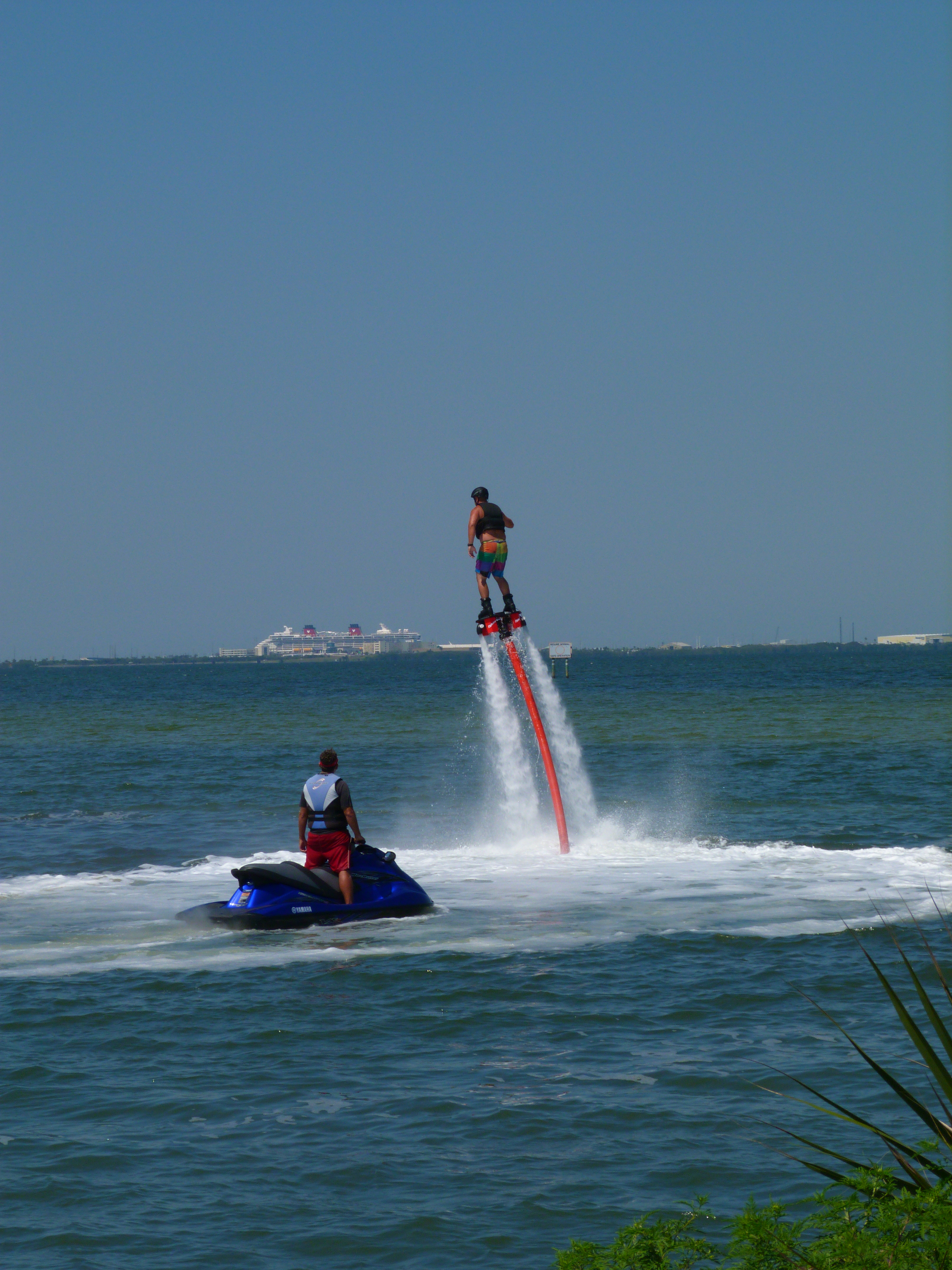
A Flyboard with its distinctive configuration of having the nozzles located below the pilot's feet

The 21st century has seen a new approach to jet packs where water is used as a high-density propulsion fluid. This requires a very large mass of fluid that makes a self-contained jet pack infeasible. Instead, this approach separates the engine, fuel and fluid supply from the pilot's flying apparatus, using a long flexible hose to feed the water to the jet nozzle pack attached to the pilot's body. These inventions are known as "hydro jet packs", and successful designs have used jetski technology as the powerplant operating in a body of water (an ocean, lake, or pool) to provide the needed propulsion. Several hydro jet pack approaches have been successfully tested and put into production. Flow rate can be controlled by a throttle operator on the jetski, or by the pilot using a remote actuator.

Hydro jet packs can be operated below the water's surface as well as above it. As of 2013, many hydro jet pack rental businesses are operating in various locations around the world.

=== JetLev ===
The JetLev was the first hydroflight jet pack on the market, and its makers were awarded the first patents, in 2008, for hydro jet packs. The JetLev has the appearance of a typical jet pack, with two nozzles on a backpack propelling the rider upwards. It has an umbilicus to the powering jetski that provides the water for the thrust used.

=== Flyboard ===
A Flyboard has water jets under each of the pilot's feet. An optional feature is a lower-thrust water jet for each arm for greater control. The powerplant is a regular jetski. Development for this approach was started in the spring of 2011.

=== Firefighters ===
Firefighters in some parts of the world use jet packs which help them to fight fires close to the sea or a water body. The jet packs use water and there is no need for a fire truck or water tank.

== Home-made versions ==
Episode 32 of MythBusters investigates the urban legend of an affordable jet pack or rocket pack that can be built from plans purchased on the Internet. Extensive modifications were made by the MythBusters team due to vagueness in the plans and because of the infeasibility of the specified engine mounting system. The jet pack produced by MythBusters had two ducted fans powered by ultralight-type piston engines. They found it was not powerful enough to lift a person off the ground, and was expensive to build. The plans specified a Rotax 503 ultralight engine, but they intended to use the more powerful and lighter Rotax 583 engine before a similar lighter unnamed engine was substituted.

== In fiction ==
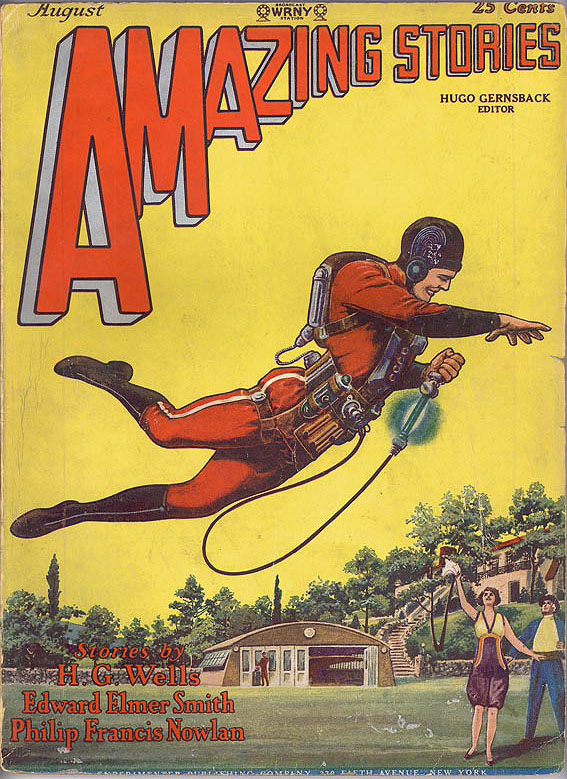
A jet pack wearing hero on the cover of Amazing Stories, August 1928. The cover illustrates The Skylark of Space.

The concept of jet packs appeared in popular culture, particularly science fiction, long before the technology became practical. Perhaps the first appearance was in pulp magazines. The 1928 cover of Amazing Stories featured a man flying with a jet pack.

When Republic Pictures planned to produce a superhero serial using its renowned "flying man" scenes as used in The Adventures of Captain Marvel, the character of Captain Marvel was tied up in litigation with the owners of the character of Superman. For its postwar superhero serial, Republic used a jet pack in King of the Rocket Men. The same stock special effects were used in other serials.

While several science fiction novels from the 1950s featured jet packs, it was not until the Bell Rocket Belt in the 1960s that the jet pack caught the imagination of the mainstream. Bell's demonstration flights in the U.S. and other countries created significant public enthusiasm.

== See also ==
- Aérospatiale Ludion
- Backpack helicopter
- Bell Pogo
- History of the jet engine
- Jetpack man
- Martin Jetpack, despite its name, was a backpack helicopter
- Space Ranger (device) advertised in Popular Science, 1970s
- Wingsuit flying
