= Măgureni =

- Commune
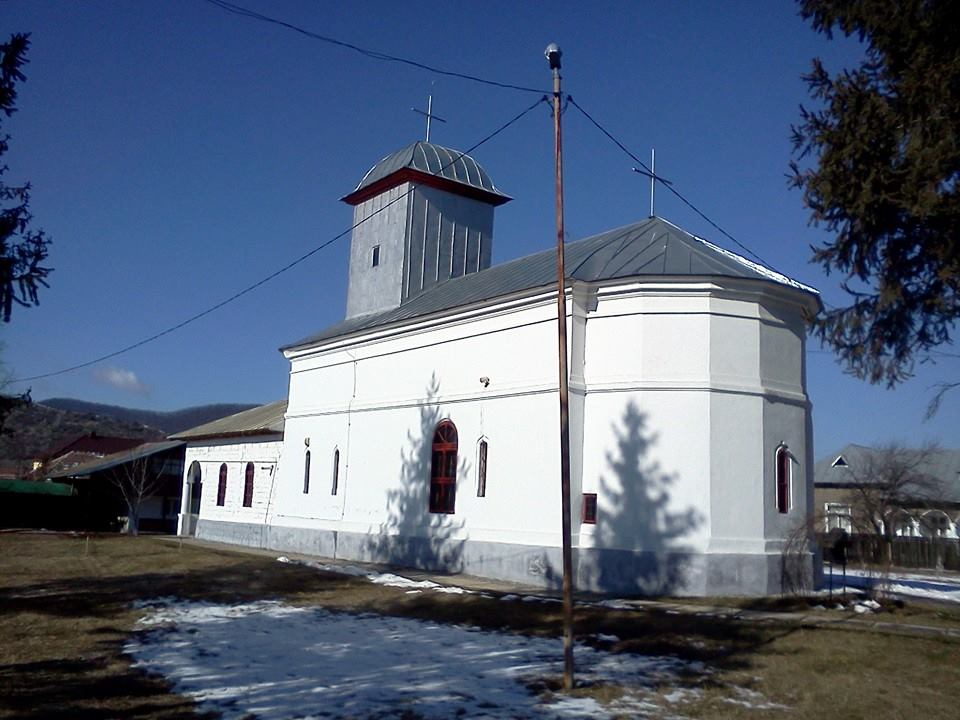
- Holy Trinity Church in Măgureni

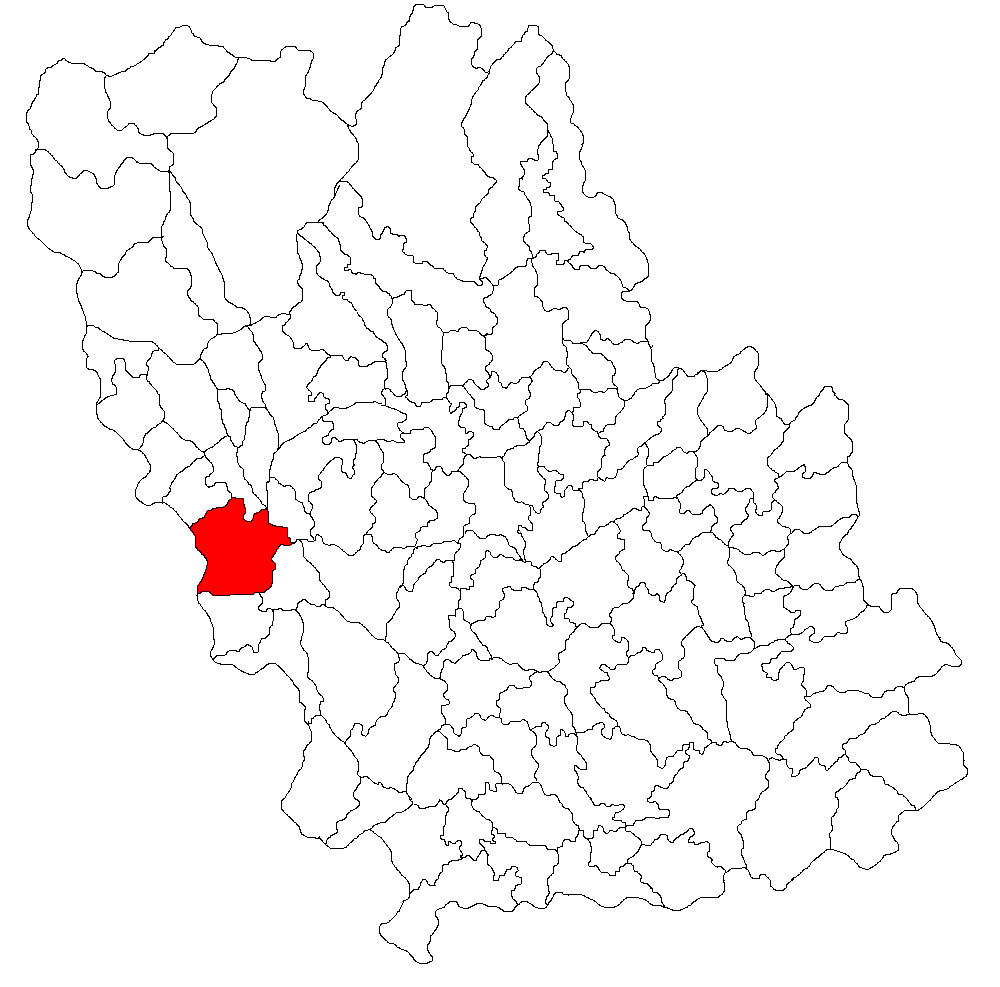
- Location in Prahova County

- Location in Romania
- Coordinates: 45.0439°N 25.7516°E
- Country: Romania
- County: Prahova

Government
  - Mayor (2024–2028): Gheorghe Iordache (PSD)
- Area: 48.03 km^{2} (18.54 sq mi)
- Elevation: 342 m (1,122 ft)
- Population (2021-12-01): 5,674
  - Density: 118.1/km^{2} (306.0/sq mi)
- Time zone: UTC+02:00 (EET)
  - Summer (DST): UTC+03:00 (EEST)
- Postal code: 107350
- Area code: +(40) 244
- Vehicle reg.: PH
- Website: comunamagureni.ro

Măgureni is a commune in Prahova County, Muntenia, Romania. It is composed of three villages: Cocorăștii Caplii, Lunca Prahovei, and Măgureni.

At the 2002 census, 6,630 inhabitants were counted, all but three of whom were ethnic Romanians; 97.3% of inhabitants were Romanian Orthodox, and 2.6% were Adventist. At the 2021 census, Măgureni had a population 5,674, of which 92.51% were Romanians.

Historical population
Year	Pop.	±%
1992	6,765	—
2002	6,630	−2.0%
2011	5,777	−12.9%
2021	5,674	−1.8%
Source: Census data

== Natives ==
- Justin Capră (1933–2015), engineer and inventor
