= Queen's College, Taunton =

Independent day and boarding school in Taunton, Somerset, England

Coordinates: 51°00′07″N 3°07′00″W

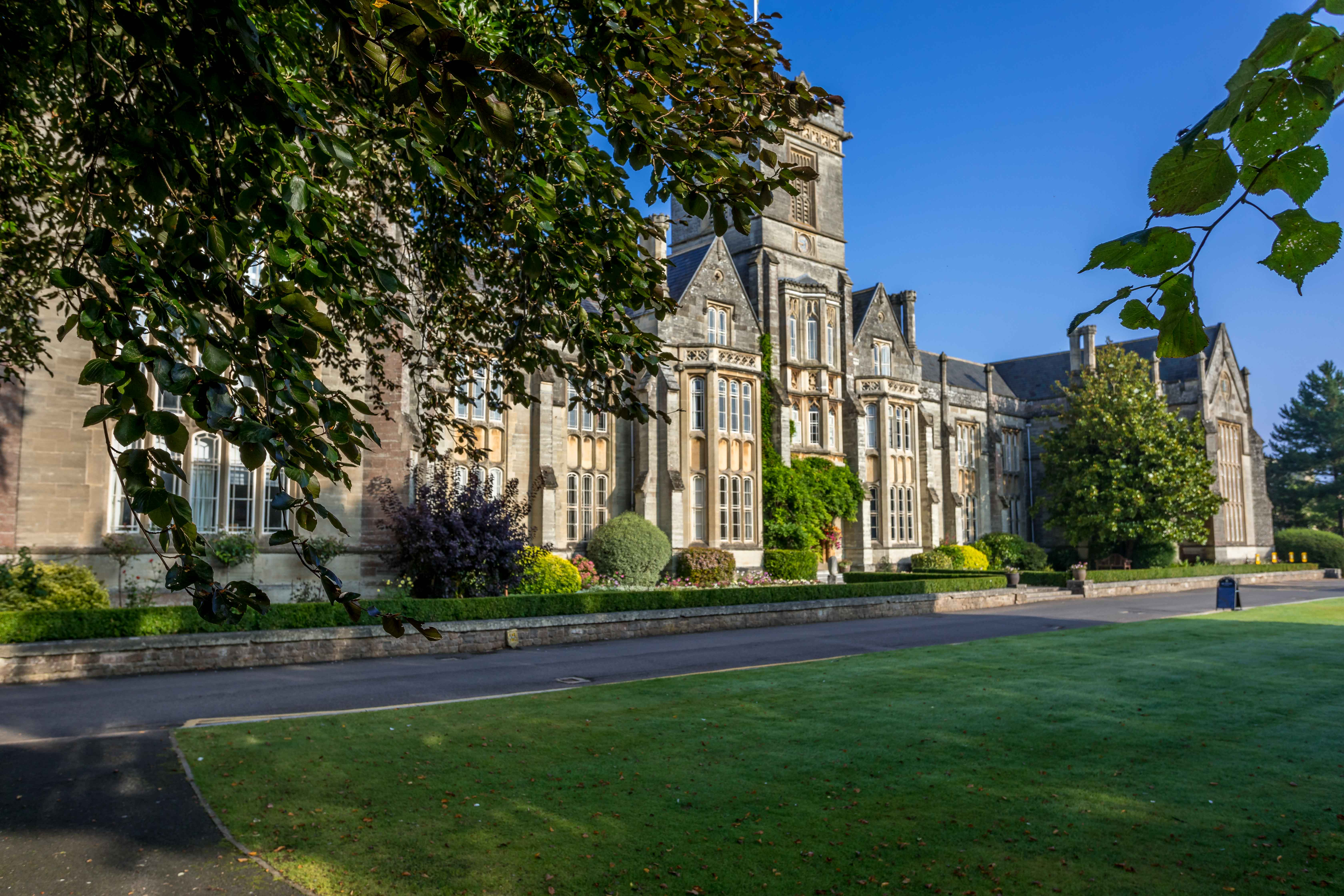

Location
- Trull Road; Taunton, Somerset, TA1 4QS; England

Information
- Type: Private day and boarding school
- Motto: Non scholae sed vitae discimus "We learn not for school, but for life"
- Religious affiliation: Methodist
- Established: 1843; 183 years ago
- Department for Education URN: 123913 Tables
- Headmaster: Julian Noad
- Gender: Co-educational
- Age: 3 months to 18 years
- Enrolment: 645
- Houses: 4 boarding houses, 4 day pupil houses
- Colours: Gold and grey
- Former pupils: Old Queenians
- Website: www.queenscollege.org.uk

Queen's College is a co-educational private school located in Taunton, the county town of Somerset, England. It is a day and boarding school for pupils aged 0–18. The school incorporates nursery, pre-prep, prep, and senior schools. The current Head of College is Julian Noad. Henry Matthews is headmaster of Queen's College Prep School.

== History ==
First known as the Wesleyan Collegiate Institute, Queen's College was established by the Wesleyan Methodist Church in 1843. Originally located in the Norman castle in the town centre, the school opened with 34 pupils on 12 July 1843.

Under the headship of Thomas Sibly (1813-1892) the school outgrew the old school classrooms and so a new building was commissioned in 1845 in the Trull area. Due to the increasing popularity of the school, they were forced to vacate the castle premises in 1847 and move into the new building before it was finished. The current school building is a symmetrical Tudor Gothic building built by Giles and Gane in 1845 and has been designated as a Grade II* listed building. The original school site consisted of the main school building and upper playing fields. Since then the buildings have expanded, with the bridge and library (now known as the Wyvern Hall) being added to the school in the 1920s. This addition was built in commemoration, along with the obelisk on the front lawn, for those who served in the First World War.

== Present day ==
The school sits in approximately 35 acres (140,000 m^{2}) of grounds.

Since the 1970s the school has been co-educational with both female and male boarding houses being present on the school grounds. In 2016 the school appointed their first female head teacher, Lorraine Earps. Earps was replaced by Julian Noad on 12 August 2021.

The school is part of the Methodist Independent Schools Trust.

== Notable former pupils ==
Former pupils are known as Old Queenians, and include:

- Ben Ackland, Irish cricketer
- Augustus Molade Akiwumi, former Speaker of the Parliament of Ghana and justice of the Supreme Court of Ghana
- Tom Austen, English actor, known for his television appearances portraying Jasper Frost on The Royals and Guy Hopkins on Grantchester
- John Baron, Conservative Party MP
- Sir Robert Bond, prime minister of Newfoundland 1900–1909
- Richard Browning, inventor of a "jet suit"; founder and chief test pilot of 'Gravity Industries'
- Arthur Henry Reginald Buller, mycologist and President of the Royal Society of Canada
- Matthew Clay, 2006 Commonwealth Games Gold Medallist in Swimming
- Carrie Davis, Radio 1 sports analyst
- Sir Nicholas Barton "Nick" Harvey, Liberal Democrat MP
- Sir Robert Hart — Inspector-General of China's Imperial Maritime Customs Service 1863–1907
- Arthur Henderson, British Labour politician, Baron Rowley of Rowley Regis, Secretary of State for Air 1947–1951
- Peter Honess, Oscar-nominated, BAFTA award-winning Hollywood film editor (L. A. Confidential); member of the Academy of Motion Picture Arts and Sciences
- Jake Lintott, Hampshire County Cricket Club
- Peter Mitchell, 1978 Nobel Prize winner in chemistry
- James Owen, theoretical astrophysicist
- Martin Pipe, racehorse trainer, credited with professionalising the British racehorse training industry
- Dean Ryan, England international rugby union player and head coach of Gloucester RFU Club
- Leighton Seager, 1st Baron Leighton of St Mellons, shipping magnate
- Sir George Shenton, mayor of Perth, Western Australia 1880–1884 & 1886–1888
- Harold Arthur Watkinson, Conservative Party politician and businessman, 1st Viscount Watkinson of Woking, Minister of Defence 1959–1962
- Ed Weeks, actor, comedian, and script writer
- John Passmore Widgery, Baron Widgery of South Molton, Lord Chief Justice of England and Wales 1971–1980
- James Howard Williams (Elephant Bill), British Army officer and author
- Becky Wilde, Great Britain rower, and Olympian. Bronze medal Paris Olympics 2024
- William Wynn Jones, Anglican Bishop of Central Tanganyika

== Headteachers ==
Lorraine Earps then became the first female head teacher of Queen's College. On 12 August 2021 Julian Noad took over from Earps as Head of College. The current head of the prep school is Henry Matthews.

A former headmaster at the school was found guilty by a professional conduct panel of "unacceptable professional conduct" over a series of allegations.
