= Justin Capră =

Romanian engineer (1933–2015)

Justin Virgilius Capră
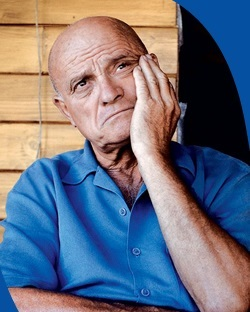
- Capră in 2011
- Born: 22 February 1933; Măgureni, Prahova County, Romania
- Died: 19 January 2015 (aged 81); Ploiești, Romania
- Citizenship: Romanian
- Scientific career
- Fields: Aeronautical engineering

Virgilius Justin Capră (22 February 1933 – 19 January 2015) was a Romanian engineer and inventor.

== Biography ==
Born in Măgureni, Prahova County, he was trained as an aeronautical engineer. He claimed to have devised over a hundred inventions, although a search revealed only two patents in his name. Machines on which he worked included 72 fuel-efficient cars, 15 unconventional engines and seven aircraft. He reported that as early as 1949–1950, he built a motor that would respond to verbal commands. A 1955 two-wheel automobile, which he dubbed the Virgilius, used an airplane motor, reached 300 km/hour and weighed 250 kg. One of his cars, which he called the Soleta and which he modeled in 1973, was unusually small. It consumed 0.5 liters of gasoline per 100 km. Later, he continued developing prototypes for battery-powered motors, with a particular focus on increased efficiency and decreased weight.

Perhaps his most notorious claim is to have invented the jet pack. According to an interview he gave, he proposed this device to the Romanian Academy in 1956 and completed it in 1958. When the academy declined to show interest, he offered it to the American Embassy, which was also uninterested. He was then jailed by the Communist regime for having approached the embassy. He claimed to have flown the device and received a patent in 1958. Although he later showed photographs of a device, he was unable to prove when he built it, whether he flew it or when the photographs were taken. He never explained how he learned to fly his device, how long he stayed airborne, how many times he flew it, or why there is no contemporary documentation of the flight.

Nevertheless, in Romania alone, his claim to have invented the jet pack is widely believed. While Capră undoubtedly built two jet pack-like devices, the second one dated from the mid-1960s, and he claimed that as the groundbreaking model. At the same time, he admitted his 1958 design did not work. Still, he claimed that an American design for a jet pack only appeared in 1962, four years after his own. However, one team from Bell Laboratories applied for a patent in 1960, while another, from Thompson Ramo Woolridge in Ohio, filed in 1958, the same year Capră said he filed in Romania. Despite the shakiness of Capră's assertions, it is widely accepted in Romania that at least one of his jet packs was flown before Bell's. Additionally, many Romanian sources on Capră state that "the Americans" stole his design. What likely transpired is that Capră' who had no independent evidence he built anything before 1967, saw the Bell model fly and copied it. This second model is in a museum in Bucharest, although he probably never flew it. Late in life, he began to state that he beat Bell by two years. A resident of Filipeștii de Pădure in his later years, he died in Ploiești.
