= AMT Nike =

AMT Nike is a small turbojet, used to power model, homebuilt aircraft and some jetpacks.

== Applications ==
- JB-9

== Specifications ==
Data from

==== General characteristics ====
- Type: Turbojet
- Length: 524 mm
- Diameter: 201 mm
- Dry weight: 8,770 g (19.33 lb)

==== Components ====
- Compressor:
- Fuel type: Kerosene

==== Performance ====
- Maximum thrust: 784 N (176 lbf)
