= Bell Rocket Belt =

Type of rocket pack

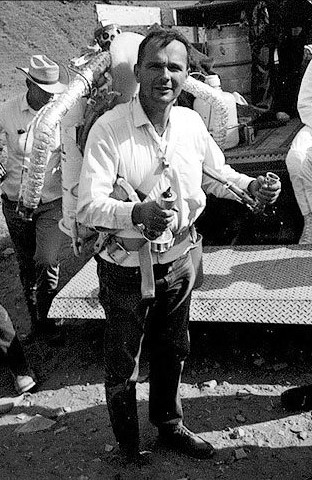
Astrogeologist Gene Shoemaker wearing a Bell Rocket Belt while training astronauts

The Bell Rocket Belt is a low-power rocket propulsion device that allows an individual to safely travel or leap over small distances. It is a type of rocket pack.

== Overview ==
Bell Aerosystems began development of a rocket pack which it called the "Bell Rocket Belt" or "man-rocket" for the US Army in the mid-1950s. It was demonstrated in 1961. Its 5 US gallons (19 L) of hydrogen peroxide fuel provided only 21 seconds of flight-time so it did not impress the army. After U.S. patent 3,243,144 was applied for in 1964 and granted in 1966, development was cancelled.

This concept was revived in the 1990s and these packs can provide powerful, manageable thrust. This rocket belt's propulsion works with superheated water vapour. A gas cylinder contains nitrogen gas, and two cylinders containing highly concentrated hydrogen peroxide. The nitrogen presses the hydrogen peroxide onto a catalyst, which decomposes the hydrogen peroxide into a mixture of superheated steam and oxygen with a temperature of about 740 °C. This was led by two insulated curved tubes to two nozzles where it blasted out, supplying the propulsion. The pilot can vector the thrust by altering the direction of the nozzles through hand-operated controls. To protect from resulting burns the pilot had to wear insulating clothes.

The Bell Rocket Belt was successful and popular but was limited in its potential uses to the Army due to limited fuel storage. As a result, the Army turned its attention to missile development, and the Rocket Belt project was discontinued.

One Bell Rocket Belt is on display at the Smithsonian Institution's National Air and Space Museum annex, the Steven F. Udvar-Hazy Center, located near Dulles Airport. Another resides at the State University of New York at Buffalo's Department of Industrial and Systems Engineering. It has been used in presentations at Disneyland and at the 1984 Summer Olympics and 1996 Summer Olympics opening ceremonies. It has also been seen in movies and on television. This type of rocket belt was used in the 1965 James Bond film Thunderball. It also made an appearance in the Lost in Space television series as well as the 1976 CBS Saturday morning children's live action TV show Ark II.

== History ==
Wendell F. Moore began working on a rocket pack as early as 1953 (possibly, after learning about Thomas Moore's work) while working as an engineer at Bell Aerosystems. Experiments began in the mid-1950s. Developing the engine did not present difficulties — the application of hydrogen peroxide was well developed by missilemen. The main problem was achieving stable and steady flight; for this, a reliable and convenient control system had to be developed.

In 1959 the U.S. Army contracted Aerojet General to conduct feasibility studies on a Rocket Belt and contracted Bell Aerosystems to develop a Small Rocket Lift Device (SRLD). The experimental rig, which worked on compressed nitrogen, was prepared. Its steel tubing frame allowed a tester to be attached to the rig. Two hinged nozzles were set on the frame. Nitrogen at 35 atmospheres (3.5 MPa) was supplied to the nozzles by flexible hoses. An engineer-operator on the ground regulated the supply of nitrogen through a valve. Additionally, the tester regulated the thrust using levers under his shoulders. The tester inclined the nozzles forward and backward, trying to reach stable hovering at a limited height. A safety tether was attached from below, so that the rig and tester could not fly too high.

=== Testing ===
The first tests showed that the human body was a very unstable platform. Testing found the best arrangement for the jet nozzles relative to the center of gravity of both the pilot and pack that allowed for directional control. Wendell Moore and other members of his group participated in the test flights. These first flights were just sharp leaps, but proved the concept and persuaded the military to fund development. The Bell company was awarded a contract to develop, flight test, and demonstrate a practical SRLD.

A rocket motor with a thrust of 280 pounds-force (1.25 kN or 127 kgf) was chosen. The pack with its fuel weighed 125 pounds (57 kg). The pack had a fiberglass frame contoured to fit the operator's body, secured with straps, and cylinders of fuel and nitrogen were attached to the frame. The motor was fastened using a hinged assembly that was controlled by levers under the shoulders while thrust was controlled through a regulator assembly connected to a throttle handle on the right lever of the device. The handle on the left lever governed the slant of the (jetavators) nozzles. Tests of the pack began toward the end of 1960 and were performed in a large hangar with a safety tether. Wendell Moore completed the first 20 tethered takeoffs while making incremental improvements.

On 17 February 1961, the pack veered sharply, reaching the end of the safety tether, which then broke, causing Moore to fall approximately 2.5 meters, breaking his kneecap and rendering him unfit for further flights. Engineer Harold Graham took over as test pilot and testing resumed on 1 March. He then carried out 36 more tethered tests which enabled them to achieve stable control of the pack.

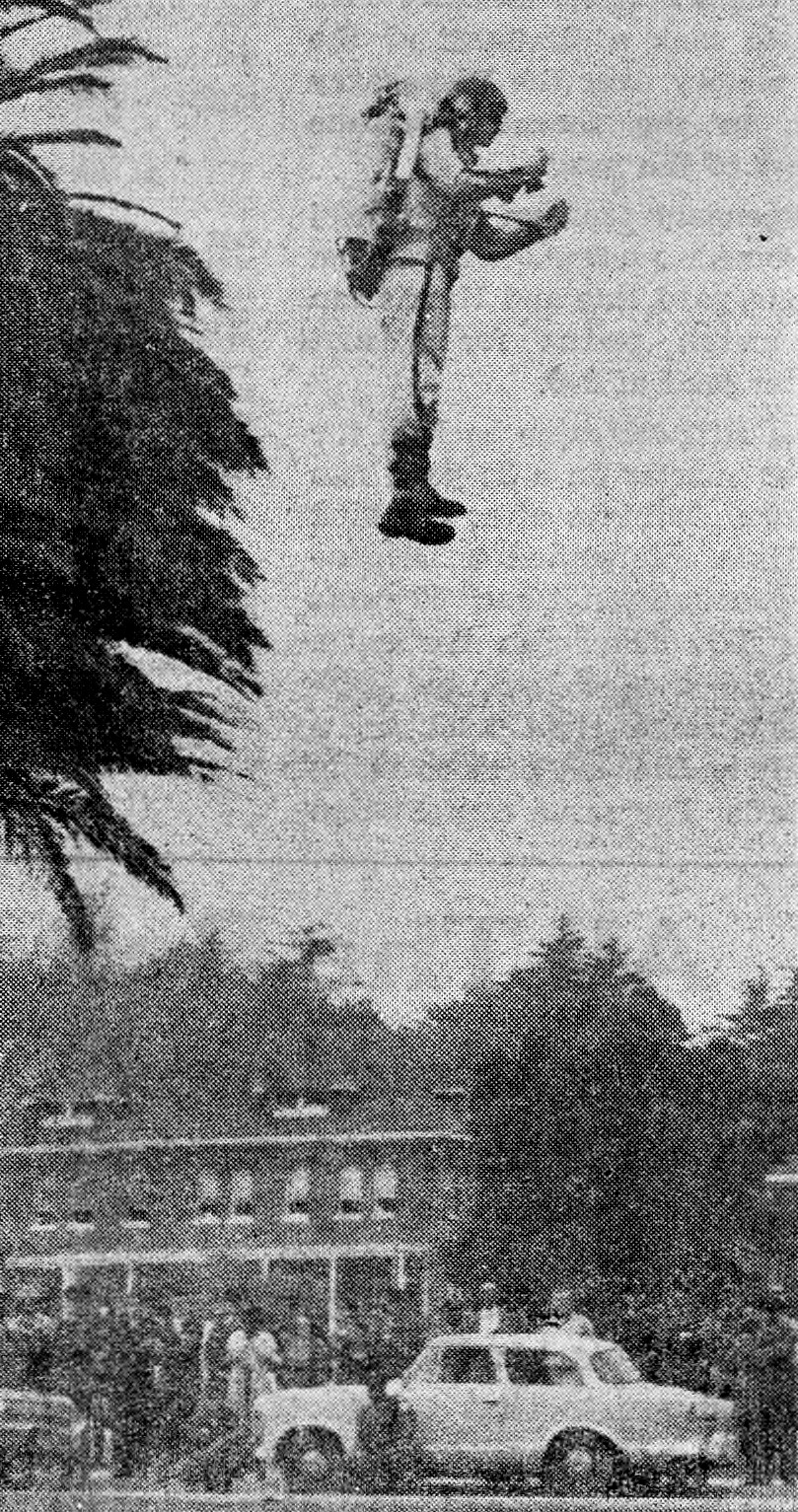
The Bell Rocket Belt during a demonstration flight at Presidio Army Base in San Francisco, California.

On 20 April 1961 (the week after Yuri Gagarin's flight), on a vacant spot near the Niagara Falls airport, the first free flight of a rocket pack was performed. Harold Graham reached a height of approximately 4 feet (1.2 meters), and then flew smoothly forward at a speed of approximately 10 km/h for a distance of 108 feet (less than 35 meters) and then landed. The flight lasted 13 seconds.

In subsequent flights Graham learned how to control the pack and perform more complex maneuvers: flying in a circle and turning on a spot. He flew over streams and cars, ten-meter hills, and between trees. From April through May 1961 Graham carried out 28 additional flights. Wendell Moore worked to achieve reliability from the pack and confident piloting from Graham in preparation of presenting the rocket pack to the public. In the course of testing, maximums of duration and distance were achieved: duration 21 seconds; range 120 m; height 10 m; speed, 55 km/h.

=== Demonstrations ===
On 8 June 1962, the pack was publicly demonstrated for the first time before several hundred officers at the Fort Eustis military base. Other public demonstrations then followed, including the famous flight in the Pentagon courtyard. On that day Harold Graham flew before 3000 members of the military department, who observed with enthusiasm.

On 11 October 1961, (according to other data, 12 October) the pack was demonstrated personally to President John F. Kennedy in the course of experimental maneuvers on the military base Fort Bragg. Graham took off from an amphibious LST, flew over a strip of water, and landed in front of the President.

Harold Graham and a support crew travelled to many cities in the USA. They visited Canada, Mexico, Argentina, Germany, and France, as well as other countries. Each time they successfully demonstrated the rocket pack in action before the public. However, the army was disappointed. The maximum duration of flight of the rocket pack was 21 seconds, with a range of only 120 m. A large contingent of service personnel needed to accompany the rocket pack. During flight 5 U.S. gallons (19 liters) of hydrogen peroxide was expended. In the opinion of the military, the "Bell Rocket Belt" was more a spectacular toy than an effective means of transport. The army spent $150,000 on the Bell Aerosystems contract. Bell spent an additional $50,000. The army refused any further expenditure on the SRLD program, and the contract was cancelled.

== Design ==
The rocket could carry a man over 9-m-high obstacles and reached a speed of 11 to 16 km/h. However, its flying time was limited to 20 seconds. A later advancement during the years 1995–2000 could not improve the flying time to any more than 30 seconds.

Apart from the extremely limited working time, this rocket belt did not allow for a controlled landing should its drive fail, as it would operate at altitudes far too low for a parachute to function. This represents a substantial safety risk and differentiates the rocket belt from airplanes and helicopters, which can land safely without power by gliding or autorotation.

=== Operating principle ===
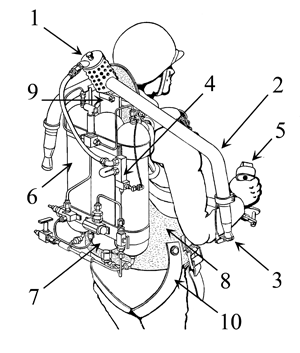
U.S. patent 3,243,144, 1966 rocket pack "Bell Rocket Belt"

All existing rocket packs are based on the construction of the "Bell Rocket Belt" pack, developed from 1960 to 1969 by Wendell Moore.

Moore's pack has two major parts:

- Rigid glass-plastic corset (8), strapped to the pilot (10). The corset has a tubular metallic frame on the back, on which are fixed three gas cylinders: two with liquid hydrogen peroxide (6), and one with compressed nitrogen (7). When the pilot is on the ground, the corset distributes the weight of the pack to the pilot's back.
- The rocket engine, able to move on a ball and socket joint (9) in the upper part of the corset. The rocket engine consists of a gas generator (1) and two pipes (2) rigidly connected with it, which end with jet nozzles with controlled tips (3). The engine is rigidly connected to two levers, which are passed under the pilot's hands. Using these levers the pilot inclines the engine forward or back and to the sides. On the right lever is the thrust control throttle (5), connected via a cable to the regulator valve (4) to supply fuel to the engine. On the left lever is the steering handle, which moves the tips of the jet nozzles, allowing the pilot to control his yaw.

Operating principle of rocket engine

The whole construction is simple and reliable; except for the regulator valve and steerable nozzles, the rocket engine has no moving parts.

- The figure shows the engine, hydrogen peroxide cylinders and compressed nitrogen cylinder (pressure c. 40 atm or 4 MPa).
- The pilot turns the engine thrust control handle, opening the regulator valve (3).
- Compressed nitrogen (1) displaces liquid hydrogen peroxide (2), which is piped to the gas generator (4).
- There it contacts the catalyst (thin silver plates, covered with a layer of samarium nitrate) and decomposes.
- The resulting hot high-pressure mixture of steam and oxygen gas enters two pipes, which emerge from the gas generator.
- These pipes are covered with a layer of insulation to reduce heat loss.
- Then the hot gases enter the jet nozzles (De Laval nozzles), where they are first constricted, then allowed to expand, thereby accelerating them to supersonic speed and creating reactive thrust.

=== Piloting ===
The pack has two levers, rigidly connected to the engine installation. Pressing on these levers, the pilot deflects the nozzles back, and the pack flies forward. Accordingly, raising this lever makes the pack move back. It is possible to lean the engine installation to the sides (because of the ball and socket joint) to fly sideways.

Control with the aid of the lever is somewhat rough; for finer control the pilot uses a handle on the left lever. This handle governs the tips of the jet nozzles. The tips (jetavators) are spring-opposed and can, with the aid of the flexible thrusts, be slanted forward or back. The pilot inclines the handle forward or back and slants both nozzle tips at the same time to fly straight. If pilot must turn, he turns handle, to slant the nozzles in opposite directions, one forward, another back, turning the pilot and the pack around its axis. By the combination of different motions of lever handles the pilot can fly any way, even sideways, to turn, rotate on the spot, etc.

The pilot can control his rocket pack's flight differently, by changing the center of gravity of his body. For example, if we bend the legs and raise them to the stomach, the center of gravity will move forwards, and pack will be inclined and it will also fly forward. Such a control of pack, with the aid of the body, is considered incorrect and is characteristic of novices. Most experienced pilot Bill Suitor asserts that during the flight it is necessary to hold legs together and straight, and to control flight by the pack's levers and handles. This is the only way to learn to competently pilot the pack and to confidently carry out complex aerial maneuvers.

The throttle handle is on the right lever. In the closed position it completely shuts the fuel regulator valve, stopping fuel from reaching the engine. Turning the handle counterclockwise, the pilot increases the engine thrust. During servicing of the pack with compressed nitrogen the handle is held in the closed position with a shear pin for safety. The pilot's timer is on the same handle. Since the pack has fuel for only for 21 seconds of flight, it is critical to know when the pack will run out of fuel, so that the pilot can safely land before his tanks are empty.

Before the flight the timer is set for 21 seconds. When the pilot turns the handle for the takeoff, the timer begins counting and will give second-by-second signals to a buzzer in the pilot's helmet. In 15 seconds the signal becomes continuous, telling the pilot that it is time to land.

=== Special features of flights of the Bell Rocket Belt ===
The pack's pilot wears protective overalls made of thermal resistant material, since the exhaust jet and the engine's pipes are very hot. He also wears a crash helmet containing hearing protection and the buzzer for the low-fuel warning timer. The rocket thrust-chamber's supersonic exhaust jet makes a deafeningly loud (130 decibels), shrill screeching sound, very different from the roar of an airplane's jet engine.

The jet exhaust is transparent and usually not visible in air. But in cold weather the water vapor, which is a large part of the steam-gas mixture, condenses soon after it leaves the nozzle, enveloping the pilot in a cloud of fog (for this reason, the very first tethered flights of the Bell Rocket Belt were carried out in a hangar). The jet exhaust is also visible if the fuel is not decomposed completely in the gas generator, which can occur if the catalyst or the hydrogen peroxide is contaminated.

== RB2000 Rocket Belt ==
In 1992 a company was formed by Brad Barker (a former insurance salesman), Joe Wright (a Houston-based businessman), and Larry Stanley (an engineer and owner of an oil well), after inviting professional inventor Doug Malewicki, with the goal of developing a new version of the rocket pack. By 1994 they had a working prototype, which they named "RB 2000 Rocket Belt". The "RB 2000" essentially reimplemented Wendell Moore's design using light alloys (titanium, aluminium) and composite materials. It featured increased fuel stock and increased power, and the maximum duration of flight was increased to 30 seconds. It was flown on 12 June 1995 by Bill Suitor.

The partnership broke down soon thereafter, with Stanley accusing Barker of fraud and Barker taking the RB-2000 to an unknown location. A year later Stanley successfully sued Barker, who was ordered to return the RB-2000 to Stanley and pay 10 million dollars in costs and damages. When Barker refused to deliver, Stanley kidnapped him and held him captive in a box, from which Barker managed to escape after eight days. Stanley was arrested in 2002 for the kidnapping, and served an eight years sentence. Wright was murdered at his home in 1998, and the crime remains unsolved. The rocketbelt was never recovered. The story is recounted in the book The Rocketbelt Caper: A True Tale of Invention, Obsession and Murder by Paul Brown, and fictionalized in the 2008 movie Pretty Bird.

Technical characteristics of rocket pack
	Bell Rocket Belt	RB 2000 Rocket Belt
Duration	21 s	30 s
Thrust	136 kgf (1.33 kN) (calculated 127 kgf or 1.25 kN)	145 kgf (1.42 kN)
Maximum distance	approximately 250 meters or 820 feet	
Maximum altitude	18 m (59 ft)	30 m (98 ft)
Maximum speed	55 km/h or 34 mph	96 km/h or 60 mph
Equipped mass	57 kg or 125 lbs	60 kg or 132 lbs
Fuel stock	19 liters or 5 gallons	23 liters or 6 gallons

== Books ==
In 1993 a book was published by Derwin M. Beushausen entitled "Airwalker: A Date with Destiny", Rocketbelt History and Construction Plans. This was the first book ever published that went into great detail describing the history of this device and how to actually build it.

In 2000 another book was published by Derwin M. Beushausen entitled "The Amazing Rocketbelt" in which you could find the history and more construction plans for the rocketbelt device.

In 2009 William P. Suitor published a book entitled "Rocketbelt Pilot's Manual" A Guide by the Bell Test Pilot. In this book Mr. Suitor describes the rocketbelt in great detail, including servicing, fueling, and even step by step flying lessons. This is the first book ever published on the rocketbelt device by a man that has actually flown it over the years.

== Specifications ==
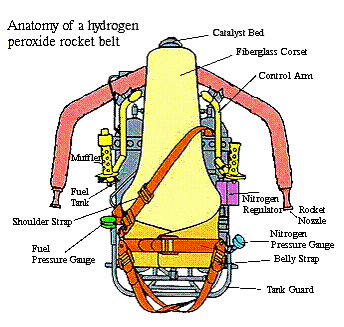
Diagram of the Bell Rocket Belt.

General characteristics

- Crew: 1
- Length: 3 ft (0.91 m)
- Gross weight: 125 lb (57 kg) (crewless)

Performance

- Maximum speed: 52 kn (60 mph, 97 km/h)860 feet
- Endurance: 20 - 30 seconds

== See also ==
- Aérospatiale Ludion - VTOL concept using similar method of control
- Bell Pogo - a two-man flying platform based on the Bell Rocket Belt
- Jet pack - includes the Bell Jet Flying Belt, the RB2000 Rocket Belt, the Moore Jet vest, and the Thiokol Jump Belt
- Pretty Bird
- The Rocketeer
