= Bell Pogo =

Two-person rocket-powered platform

The Bell Pogo was an experimental rocket vehicle that was designed by Bell Aircraft for NASA. Its function was to transport one or two astronauts on the lunar surface. The Pogo never went into production.

== The device ==
Bell Aircraft built several versions of the Pogo under contract with NASA as a possible civil and military transport, because it was intended to be used as a means of transportation on the moon during Apollo missions, as well as an army transport over things like ravines, however NASA decided not to use the POGO because of the risk of a crash, and decided to send the Lunar Roving Vehicle. Bell demonstrated that all the versions of the POGO flew in Earth atmosphere.

The first POGO was a single place model with a vertical tube with a stand for the pilot to stand with the rocket engine and peroxide tanks at the front.

A second POGO was the two place POGO that was able to carry a passenger in front and it was controlled from the back, this POGO had the rockets and tanks between the two pilots.

A last version of the Bell POGO was the "reverse" POGO built with the rocket engine and the peroxide tanks at the back. Bill Suitor was the only Bell pilot to fly the reverse POGO.

It was known to have been tested in 1967 and reportedly in 1966 and 1968.

== The "Basic US GI factor" ==
It was assumed by the US Army that a 19 year old recruit with only basic training must be able to use the kit after a brief chat and couple of demonstrations without killing or seriously injuring himself or others. It was considered too skillful for a basic GI to use.

== See also ==
- Aérospatiale Ludion
- Bell Rocket Belt
