= Space Ranger (device) =

The Space Ranger was a propane-fueled vertical take off personal transporter, similar to a platform jet pack, developed by Richard Timewell, a Canadian sheet metal worker based in a small office at Boeing Field. The transporter was advertised in several issues of Popular Science magazine during 1977–1978. United Press International's Seattle bureau on April 10, 1978, issued an article including an interview with Timewell, who stated that only one completed Space Ranger had been sold, and that he was "working out a few bugs" after hitting trees and starting fires.
