= Richard Browning (inventor) =

British inventor of "jet suits"

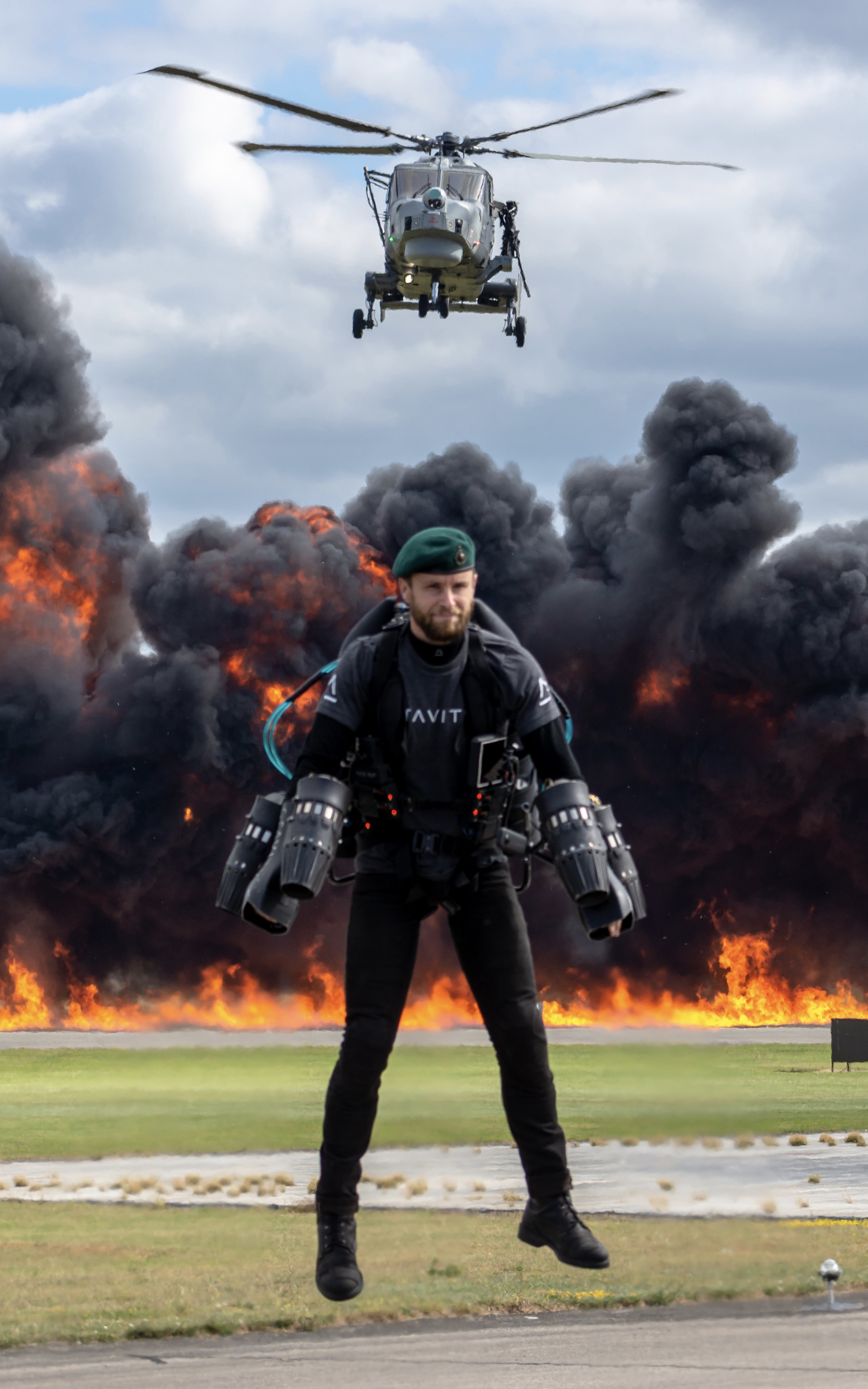
- Browning in 2019
- Education: Queen's College, Taunton, Somerset; Cardiff University
- Occupation: Inventor
- Years active: 2017–present
- Known for: Daedalus Flight Pack
- Children: 2
- Website: https://gravity.co/

Richard Browning is a British entrepreneur, inventor and the creator of the Daedalus Flight Pack "Jet Suit". He is the founder and chief test pilot of the aeronautical innovation company, Gravity Industries, the company that designs and builds the invention.

== Education ==
Browning was educated at Queen's College, a boarding and day independent school for boys (now co-educational) in the county town of Taunton in Somerset, followed by Cardiff University, where he initially studied engineering and then, after one semester, switched to exploration geology.

== Career ==
Browning set out in 2016 to experiment with the concept "using the human mind to balance and control the body in flight structure", adding power in the form of micro gas turbines (jet engines). His development journey, culminating in the first flight in November 2016, was the subject of a 2017 TED talk and the "Taking on Gravity" publication.

Browning received initial investment and launched the company Gravity Industries in April 2017 together with WIRED magazine and Red Bull. Public demonstrations of the invention included over 100 flight events across 33 countries. He was referred to as a "real-life Iron Man" by several media outlets.

TIME magazine featured the jet suit as amongst the best inventions of 2018, and has been displayed to Jeff Bezos and Mark Zuckerberg.

Gravity Industries was recognised by Guinness World Record for the fastest flight in a body-controlled jet suit in November 2019 at 85 mph (135 kmph).

Gravity Industries received a $640,000 investment from Tim Draper and Adam Draper after the first public demonstration outside Draper Associates & Boost VC offices at Hero City in San Mateo.

Gravity Industries has facilities in the UK (Frome, Somerset) and the US (Meadows Field Airport, California). The company works with Special Forces mobility, search and rescue, and medical rescue to implement the jetpack into their operations, such as that demonstrated during the NATO Mountain Warfare Exercise conducted in December 2022, where Gravity Industries participated in an exercise with demonstration of its jet suit, the first time the technology was used during a NATO mountain warfare exercise.

In 2020, the Great North Air Ambulance Service (GNAAS) tested Gravity Industries' jet suits on the hilly terrain of the Lake District in the UK, cutting a 25-minute hike to a 90-second flight. The company made headlines again in 2021, when the British Royal Navy and Royal Marines spent three days testing the jet suits with Commando Royal Marines off the UK's southern coast, to help soldiers quickly board ships at sea, which is typically done via helicopter.

Gravity Industries also performs TV & media work, commercial events & displays, brand collaborations, STEM initiatives, and public flight training & flight experiences.

The company was planning to launch the Gravity Race Series in March 2020 in Bermuda, but this was postponed due to the COVID-19 pandemic.

Gravity's jet suit was named the Daedalus suit, a name chosen by Browning's son when he was aged eight, in reference to Daedalus of Greek mythology, although as of 2022 the name is not used on the company's website.

== Race Series ==
The first ever jet suit race, a partnership between the Dubai Sports Council and Gravity Industries, took place in February 2024 in Dubai, with eight contestants from eight countries. It was the first sporting contest in the world where opponents fly in the air without the aid of an aircraft but instead rely on jet engines strapped to their backs to navigate a predetermined course.

== Personal life ==
Prior to founding Gravity, Browning was a Royal Marines reservist for 6 years and an oil trader with British Petroleum for 16 years, where he discovered and implemented major new technologies winning the BP Group innovation Award. He is married and has 2 children.

Browning released his inaugural publication, Taking on Gravity: A Guide to Inventing the Impossible from the Man Who Learned to Fly (2021, Bantam: ISBN 978-1787630895) in 2021.
