= Daedalus Flight Pack =

Jetpack

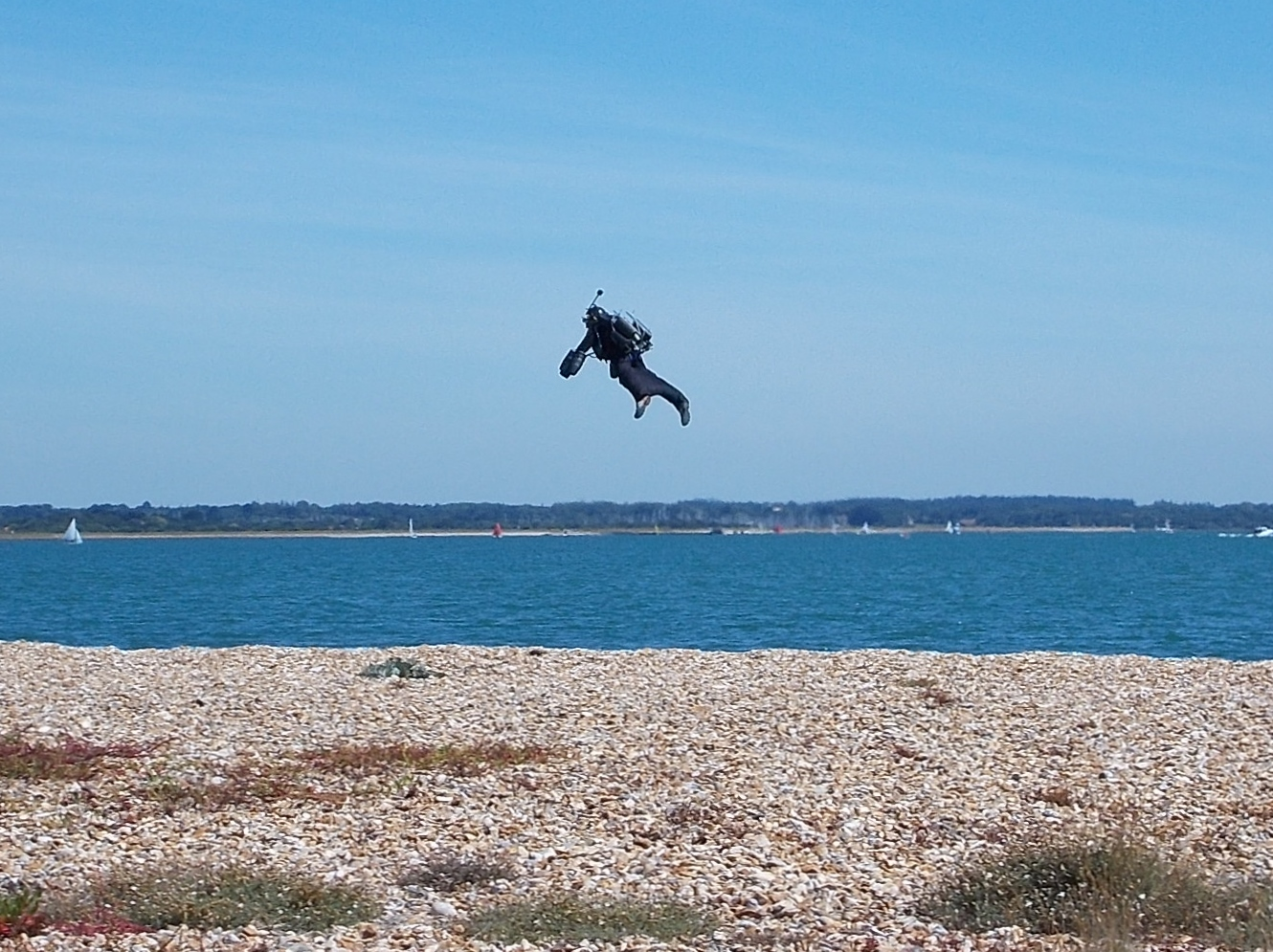
Richard Browning flying the "Daedalus" jet suit at Hurst Spit, Hampshire, England in 2019

The Daedalus Flight Pack is a jet suit capable of flying, hovering and powered jumps. It was created by British inventor Richard Browning, an athlete and Royal Marine reservist. The Daedalus is different from other manned portable flight packs in that it uses additional jets attached to the hands. These enable it to be directed by moving the arms.

== Name ==
The jet suit which Browning developed was named the Daedalus Suit, a name chosen by Browning's son when he was aged eight, in reference to Daedalus of Greek mythology. However, as of 2022, the name is not used on the company's website.

== History ==
Richard Browning began the project in 2016. The suit has been likened to the comic character Iron Man. Browning formed his own company, Gravity Industries, and used his own funding for development work. The first published test flight was revealed at the 2017 TED conference in Vancouver. Browning experimented with different numbers, configurations and arrays of jets, with varying degrees of success, before coming up with his current configuration. While initial funding came from Browning himself, since the success of the project, he has received promotional support from the Red Bull energy drink company.

In September 2020, it was reported that the Great North Air Ambulance Service was considering using the jet suit to enable paramedics to reach casualties in the mountainous Lake District. By March 2022 the operational director of the GNAA, Andy Mawson, had been trained to fly and the service hoped to start using jet suits in summer 2022.

== Technical specifications ==
The jets and powerpack are affixed to the wearer with metal frames; it uses five micro-gas turbines — two on each arm and one on the back. Their power is 1,050 bhp (780 kW), with the turbines running at 120,000 rpm. The unit weighs 27 kilograms (60 lb) and has a maximum flight time of 10 minutes, with a current speed record of 85 mph (137 km/h; 74 kn). The flight pack can reach altitudes of 2,000 feet (610 m), though it is envisaged that in normal use, it would be flown at only three or four metres above the ground.

Projected initial cost for purchase is US$250,000, although this projection is expected to come down after full production. Browning says of the technology: "Our mission is to build an inspirational technology company by re-imagining the future of human flight and pioneering aeronautical innovation." The flight pack incorporates a heads up display which displays for the user operating information, including top speed, fuel gauge, etc.

== General ==
Gravity Industries has stated that users will require vetting before use. In 2017, the Daedalus flight pack set a speed record for flight packs, at 32.02 miles per hour (51.53 kilometers per hour), awarded by the Guinness Book of Records. In 2020, YouTuber Colin Furze, known for wacky inventions and functional interpretations of movie props, video game gadgets, and other fictional devices, was given the opportunity to learn how to fly the flight pack. He made a video where he showed the process of learning to fly it, then strapped a Back to The Future Part II hoverboard onto his feet so he could "hoverboard".

== See also ==
- Aérospatiale Ludion, VTOL concept using similar method of control
