= Jet Ski (brand) =

Brand of personal water craft

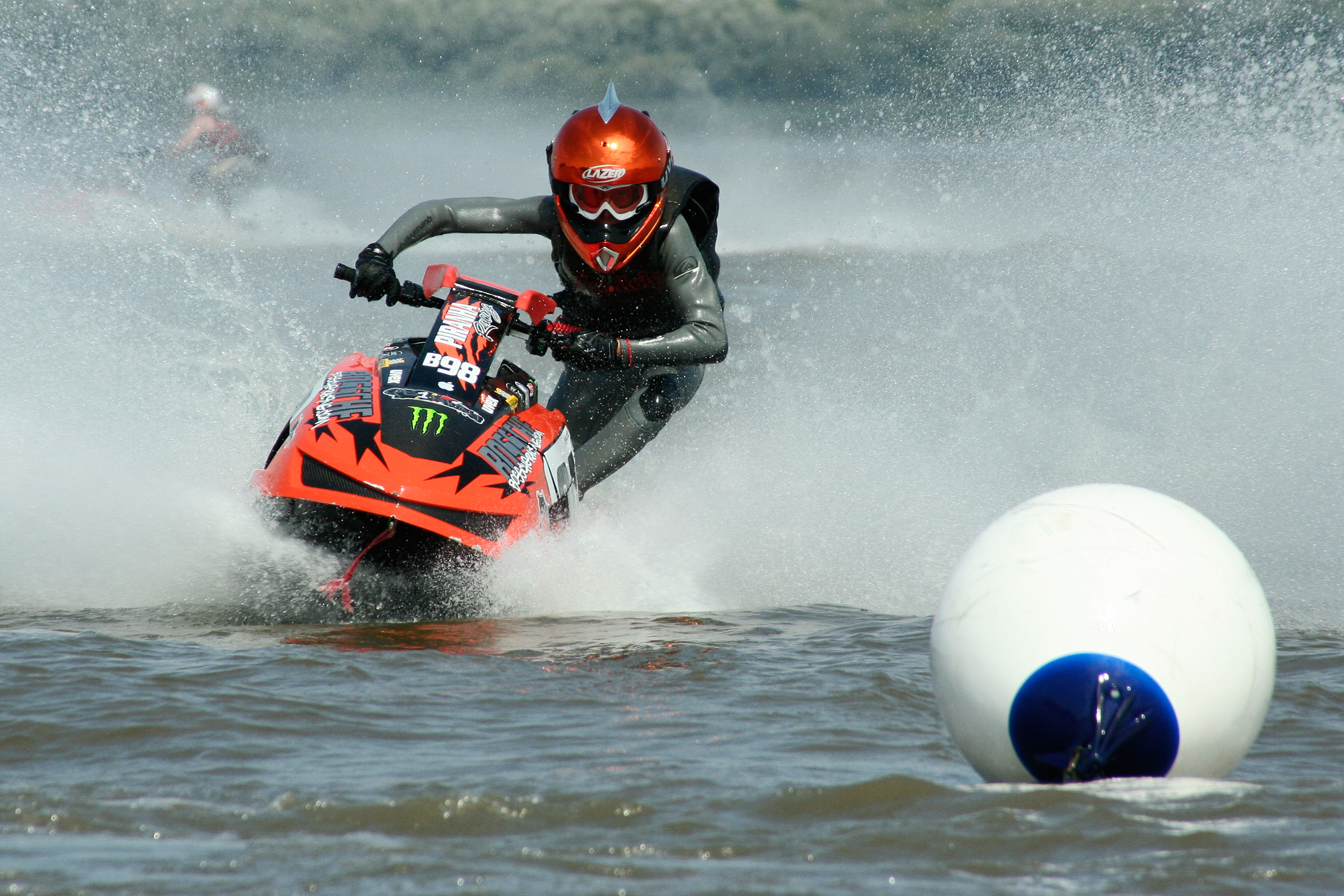
- Jet Ski DM 2007 during a race.
- Product type: Personal watercraft
- Produced by: Kawasaki Heavy Industries Motorcycle & Engine
- Country: Japan
- Introduced: 1973

Jet Ski is the brand name of a personal watercraft (PWC) manufactured by Kawasaki, a Japanese company. The term Jet ski is often used generically to refer to any type of personal watercraft used mainly for recreation, and it is also used as a verb to describe the use of any type of PWC. It mainly competes against Yamaha's WaveRunner, BRP's Sea-Doo, Taiga's electric Orca, and used specimens of Honda's now-discontinued AquaTrax.

A runabout-style PWC typically carries one to three people seated in a configuration like that of a typical bicycle or motorcycle.

== History ==
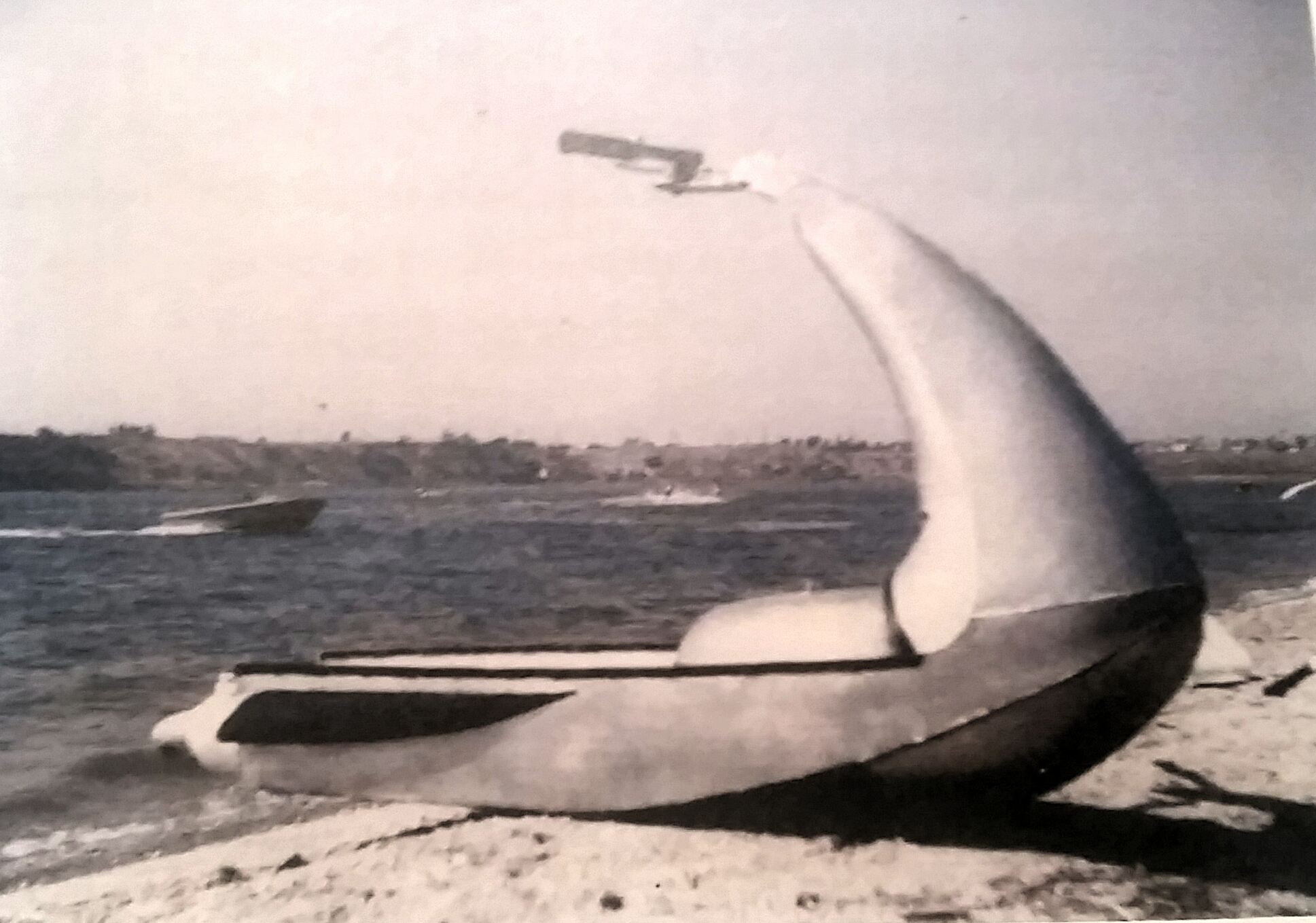
The first stand-up prototype

Jet Ski is a proper noun and registered trademark of Kawasaki. Released in 1972, the stand-up Kawasaki Jet Ski was the first commercially successful personal watercraft in America (after reaching a license agreement with the inventor of the Sea-Doo, Clayton Jacobson II when his license agreement with Bombardier expired). The Kawasaki Jet Ski was the only commercially successful PWC for almost 16 years, from the introduction of the WSAA in October 1972 through the reintroduction of the sit-down, runabout-style Bombardier Sea-Doo in 1988.

With the introduction of the Jet Ski, Kawasaki helped create the United States Jet Ski Boating Association (USJSBA), in cooperation with aftermarket companies and enthusiasts. In 1982 the name was changed to the International Jet Sports Boating Association (IJSBA). At the start, only JS440 stand-ups were raced. After Kawasaki introduced the runabout-style X2 in 1986, it gained its own class, later to be renamed the "Sport Class".

== Stand-up model history ==
=== 1972–1976 ===
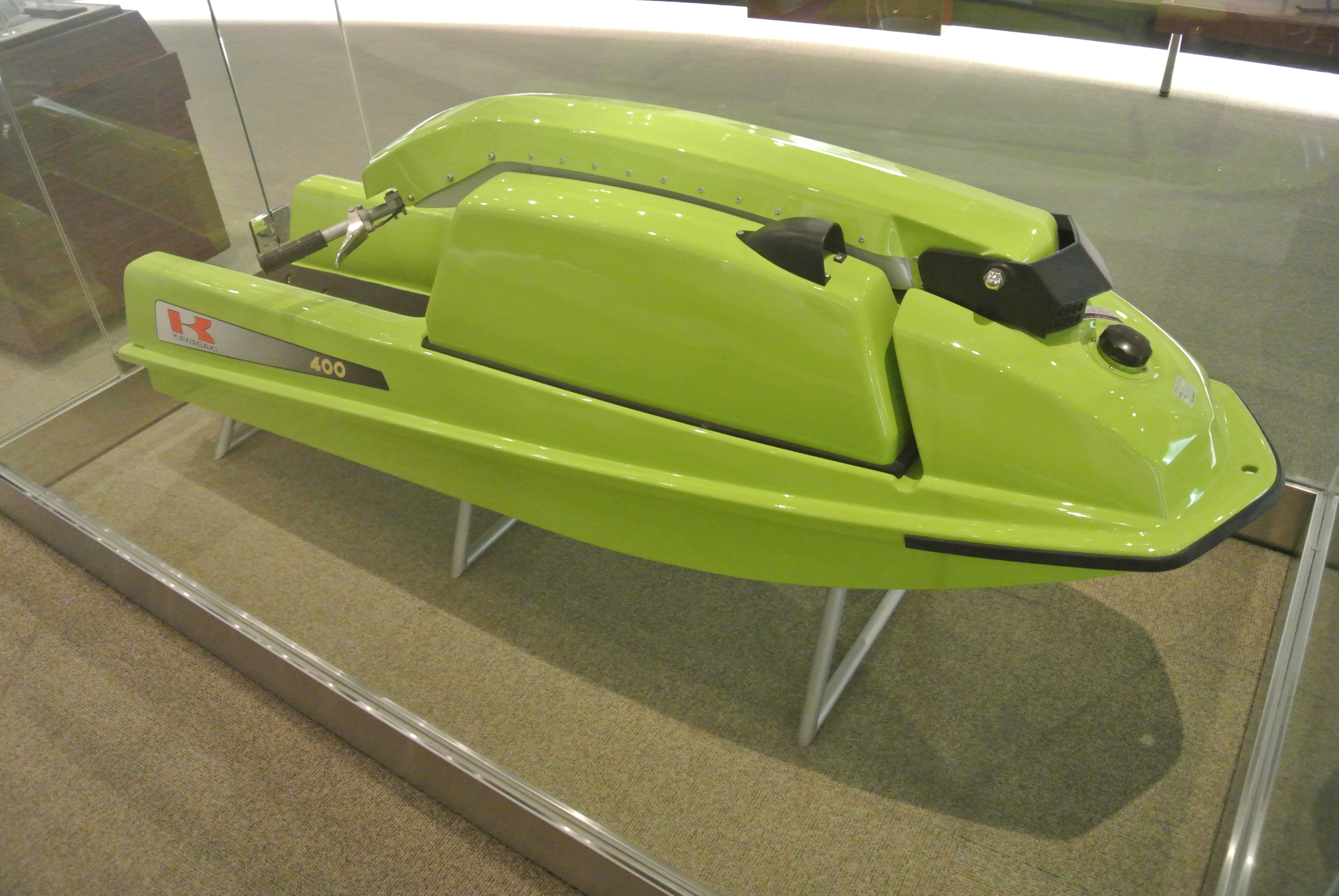
The Original 1973 Kawasaki JS400 Jet Ski.

Kawasaki introduced the first production stand-up PWC in October 1972. The WSAA and follow-on WSAB were powered by modified 400cc 2-stroke twin-cylinder engines. The WSAA was designed with a flat hull and the WSAB came with a convex v-hull design. The design concept distinctive of these original craft included a fully enclosed impeller for safety, self-righting, and self-circling features. Without a lanyard the self-circling allowed the rider to swim back to the idling craft after falling off. Kawasaki called them "Water Jet" and "Power Skis" before they settled on the name "Jet Ski".

=== 1976–1982 ===
The 1976 JS400 was popular among thrill-seeking recreational riders and racers. The 1977 JS440 offered more power and performance. It was one of Kawasaki's longest-selling models. In 1982, Kawasaki introduced the JS550, which had better performance. The 550 featured a newly designed high-capacity mixed-flow pump, driven by a 531cc engine. The 550 introduced an automatic rev limiter to prevent engine damage when the pump cavitates. The JS550 also introduced underwater exhaust for quieter operation.

=== 1982–1986 ===
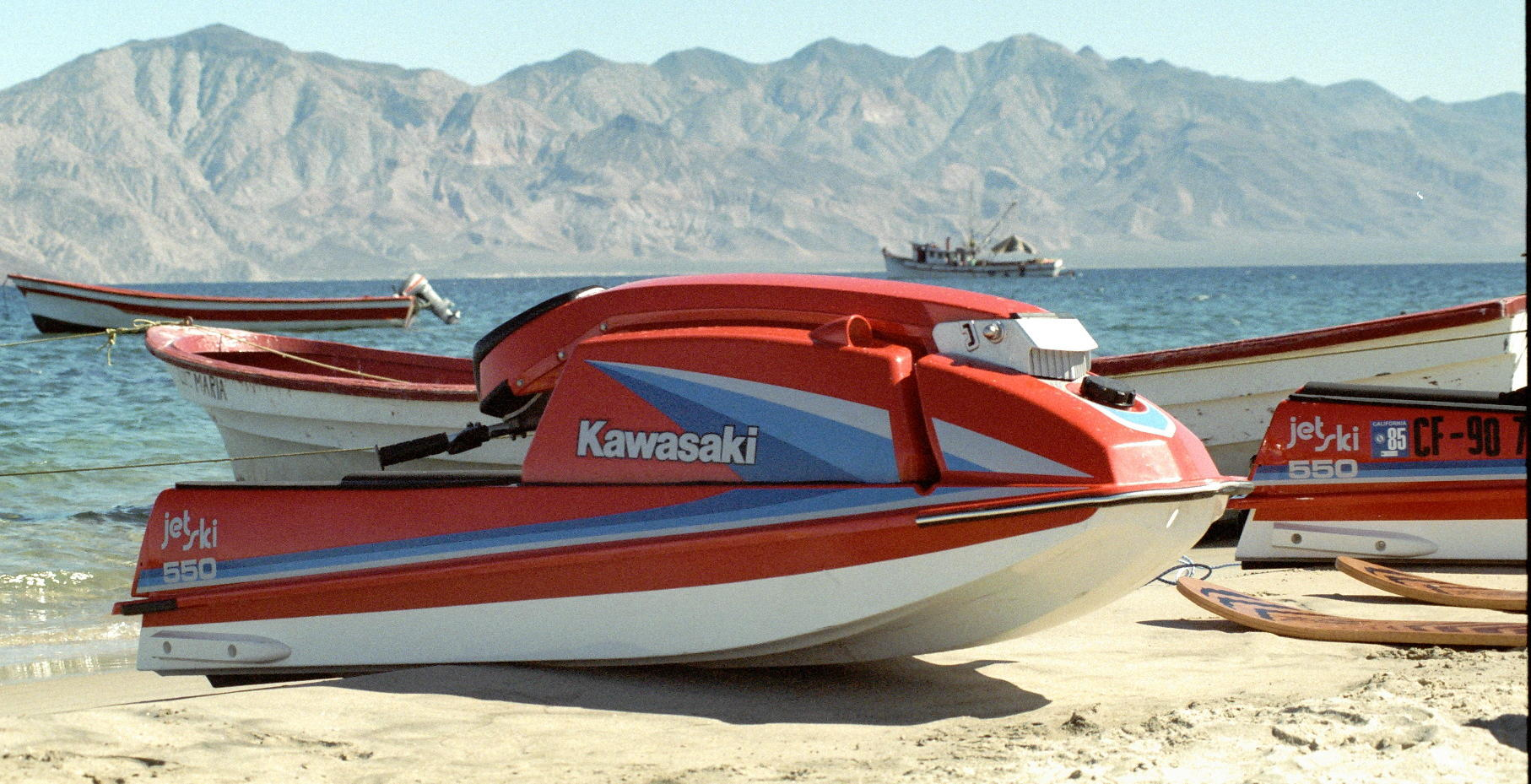
A 1985 Kawasaki 550 Jet Ski on a beach.

While the JS550 continued to be improved, in 1986, Kawasaki introduced the JS300. The JS300 was a single-cylinder 294cc two-stroke engine featuring automatic oil injection. They also added the 650 X2, their first sit-down Jet Ski, and originator of the Sport Class for PWC racing.

=== 1987–1992 ===
Kawasaki introduced the JS650SX. It featured a higher capacity axial flow pump and a powerful 635cc two-stroke twin engine in a modified V-hull design for increased maneuverability and stability.

In 1992, the company introduced a stand-up JS750-A. The engine was a twin-cylinder 743 cc two-stroke with reed valves and automatic oil injection. The redesigned hull was lighter in weight and more maneuverable.

=== 1995 ===
The 750 SXI (JS750-B) was introduced and became the first stand-up Jet Ski with dual carburetors.

=== 2003 ===
Kawasaki introduced the SX-R 800 (JS800A), which increased displacement to 781cc, in the form of an in-line twin 2-stroke engine, generating 80hp. The SX-R also moved to a fiberglass-reinforced plastic (FRP) hull and top deck.

=== 2006 ===
Kawasaki introduced the X2 800 (JF800A), which used the JS800A engine, jet unit and lower hull. This was released as an updated version similar to the 650cc X2 previously released in the 1980s.

=== 2011 ===
Due to US EPA restrictions, Kawasaki released their final two-stroke stand-up, and discontinued the JS800 SX-R. The model was designated the JS800ABF.

=== 2017 ===
On October 6, 2016, Kawasaki reintroduced the stand-up Jet Ski. The SX-R 1500 shared little with its predecessors. It was 8 feet 9 inches (2.67 m), 550+ pounds (250 kg), powered by a 160 horsepower (120 kW) inline 4-cylinder four-stroke engine.

== Models ==
Kawasaki produced various models of the Jet Ski starting in 1972, beginning with the JS400 and leading up to the current JS1500.

=== Year and model ===
- 1980: JS400
- 1981: JS440
- 1982: JS440, JS550
- 1983: JS440, JS550
- 1984: JS440, JS550
- 1985: JS440, JS550
- 1986: JS300 B-1, JS440A10, JS550
- 1987: JS300-A1 300SX, JS300-B2, JS440-A11, JS550-A6, JS 650-A1 650SX
- 1988: JS300-A2 300SX, JS300-B3, JS440-A12, JS550-A7, JS650-A2 650SX
- 1989: JS300-A3 300SX. JS440-A13, JS550-A8, JS 650-A3 650SX
- 1990: JS300-A4 300SX, JS440-A14, JS500-B1 550SX, JS650-A4SX
- 1991: JS300-A5 300SX, JS 440-A15, JS550-C1 550SX, JS 650-B1 650SX
- 1992: JS440-A16, JS550-C2 550SX, JS650-B2 650SX, JS750-A1 750SX
- 1993: JS550-C3 550SX, JS650-B3 650SX, JS 750-A2 750SX
- 1994: JS550-C4 550SX, JS750-A3 750SX
- 1995: JS550-C5 550SX, JS750-A4 750SX, JS750 B-1 750SXI
- 1996: JS750-B2 750SXI
- 1997: Focused on sit-down Jet Ski
- 1998: JS750-C1 SXI PRO
- 1999: JS750-C2 SXI PRO
- 2000: JS 750 SXI PRO
- 2001: JS750 SXI PRO
- 2002: JS750 SXI PRO
- 2003: JS800 SXR
- 2004: JS800 SXR
- 2005: JS800 SXR
- 2006: JS800 SXR
- 2006: JF800 X2
- 2007: JS800 SXR
- 2007: JF800 X2
- 2008: JS800 SXR
- 2009: JS800 SXR
- 2010: JS800 SXR
- 2011: JS800 SXR
- 2012–2016: N/A due to EPA laws and regulations
- 2017: SX-R
- 2018: SX-R
- 2019: SX-R
- 2020: SX-R
- 2021: SX-R
- 2022: SX-R

== See also ==
- Flyboard
- Jetboat
- Jetboard
- Kiteboarding
- Jetboard (hydroflight sports)
- Cable skiing
- Wakeboarding
