= Jetboard (hydroflight sports) =

Water sport

In hydroflight sports, a jetboard is a device that uses water propulsion as its means of flying above the surface of any body of water. In jetboarding, the athlete is standing in wakeboard-style boots/bindings which are attached to a board or independent base plates with jets extending downward from under the feet. The aim in jetboarding is to perform tricks such as dolphin dives, spins and backflips (even multiples), and combinations of two or more tricks.

Competitive jetboarding began in 2012 with the first Flyboard World Cup, a freestyle trick jetboard competition in which athletes are critiqued by a panel of judges. The world's first open competitive event for hydroflight jetboards, Session One, was held at LTS Training school in Pompano Beach Florida in 2016.

== See also ==
- Jet ski
- Flyboard
- Jetboat
- Jetboard
- Surfing
- Kiteboarding
- Kiteboating
