= Ben Merrell =

American sportsmen

Benjamin Judson Merrell, also known as Ben Merrell, (born July 26, 1983), is an American hydroflier. He placed third at the 2013 Flyboard World Cup Championship in Doha, Qatar. Since then, he is well-known and respected as a competitor and innovator.

== Early life and education ==
After graduating, Merrell enlisted in the U.S. Army shortly after 9/11. He completed basic training and Airborne Qualification at Fort Benning, Georgia. He served as an infantryman and was stationed at Schofield Barracks in Oahu, Hawaii. For 12 months during 2004 and 2005, he was deployed to Kandahar, Afghanistan for Operation Enduring Freedom.

After being honorably discharged in 2006, he moved home to Florida where he began his own business, Power Up Watersports.

== Flyboard ==
After ventures in car sales and real estate, Merrell found his passion in 2012 and started one of the first United States Flyboard rental companies, Power Up Watersports, located in the panhandle city of Destin, Florida. Merrell quickly became proficient on the Flyboard and qualified to compete in the 2013 World Flyboard Championship in Doha, Qatar where his huge, arcing back dolphins, daring trick combinations, and crowd-pleasing showmanship put him on the winners' platform in 3rd place. This led to sponsorships from Skat-Trak and Power fly Products, national and international performances, and attention from other companies looking to place their products on the market.

After a summer of Flyboard performances, a competitor company, X-Jetpacks, contacted Merrell in August 2014 about trying out a new Hydro flight product they called the Jet blade. With no contract interest from Flyboard, Merrell decided to test this new board to great results and satisfaction. His endorsement of the Jet blade created a firestorm of controversy in the Flyboard community, that has ultimately taken Hydro flight Sports to a greater level of competition. Merrell has earned great respect for all Hydro flight competitors and innovators. He has been interviewed on international television and written about in national and international magazines and newspapers. He recently did stunt work on the Steve Harvey show in Orlando, Florida.

In November 2014, Merrell participated in the St. Pete Fly-In held in St. Petersburg, Florida, where he served as the lead judge for an amateur Flyboard competition. Collaborating alongside a team of experienced Hydro flight professionals, Merrell played a crucial role in developing impartial and uniform guidelines for the judging process, a subject of contention in other competitions. Points were awarded to competitors based on a range of criteria, akin to the ISU system used in Olympic judging, as opposed to the bracket system more appropriate for other sports.

== Flytronics ==
After seeing a need in the Hydroflight Sports community for a wireless remote control throttle, Merrell teamed up with partner Jeff Elkins to create one. In August 2014 they designed and began manufacturing the beta version of their wireless remote control throttle, aptly named “The F4 Flight Controller”. After witnessing issues with other products that would lose signal, dropping Hydrofliers out of the air, they went back to the drawing board to incorporate a new code ensuring that Hydrofliers, from that point forward would not experience the same. They incorporated the first “Flytronics-safe-fall” technology into their wireless remote control throttle, which enables the Hydroflier to be lowered into the water, much like an elevator ride, if signal should be lost.

Shaw Kake, owner of Stratospheric Industries and inventor of the Jet Blade, has had a hand in the design lending to a more polished and applicable handle. Production started in the Spring of 2017.

== Performances and interviews ==
=== Competitions ===
Placed 1st in 2016 JABA International Championship held in Osaka, Japan (2016)
Placed 4th in 2016 Louisiana Hydro flight Invitational held in Shreveport, LA (2016)
Placed 1st in 2016 Hydro fest held in Pahrump, NV (2016)
Placed 7th in 2015 World Flyboard Championship held in Dubai (2014)
Placed 5th in 2015 National Flyboard Championship held in Shreveport, Louisiana (2014)
Placed 3rd in the 2014 World Flyboard Championship held in Doha, Qatar (2013)
Placed 9th in the 2014 National Flyboard Championship held in Toronto, Canada (2014)

=== TV interviews and magazine articles ===
Interview with Leslie Roberts on The Morning Show in Toronto, Canada (2014)
Photography in National Geographic Traveller India (2012)
Articles in Emerald Coast Magazine (2013 & 2014)
Article in Northwest Florida Daily News (2013)
Article in Destin Log (2013 & 2014)
Article in Beaches, Resorts, and Parks (2014)
Article in Destin Magazine (2014)
Destin Boat Parade (2013)
