= Flyboard Air =

Turbojet hoverboard

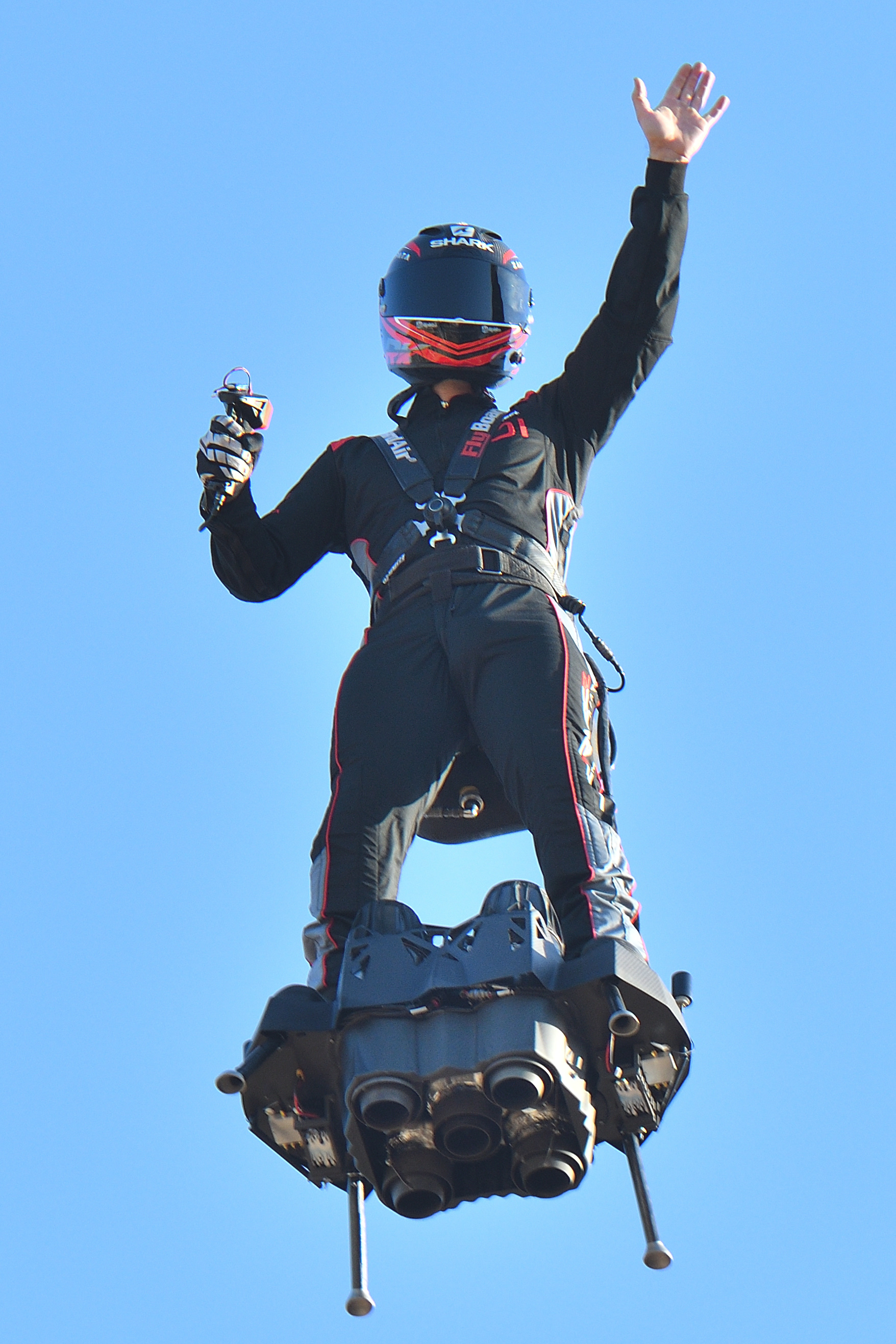
Franky Zapata on a Flyboard Air in 2022.

Flyboard Air is a type of jetpack/hoverboard powered by gas turbines. It was invented by French water-craft rider Franky Zapata, founder of Zapata racing.

It achieved a Guinness World Record for farthest flight by hoverboard in April 2016 of 2,252.4 m (7,389.8 ft; 2,463.3 yd; 1.4 mi). Zapata Racing claims that it allows flight up to an altitude of 3,000 metres (9,800 ft) and has a top speed of 150 km/h (93 mph). It also has 10 minutes' endurance. The load capacity is 102 kg (225 lb). The "jet-powered hoverboard" is powered by five turbines and is fueled by kerosene.

Zapata participated in the 2019 Bastille Day military parade riding his invention. His attempt to cross the English Channel on 25 July 2019 failed as he fell into the sea at the refuelling platform. A second crossing attempt on 4 August 2019 succeeded. Escorted by French Army helicopters and using a backpack fuel reservoir, he accomplished the journey – 35 kilometres (22 mi) – with one refueling stop at the midpoint. Zapata reached a speed of 177 km/h (110 mph) during the 20-minute flight. The trip started at Sangatte in the Pas-de-Calais department in France and concluded at St Margaret's at Cliffe in Kent, United Kingdom where he landed safely.

Reporters compared his journey to the first cross-channel flight by Louis Blériot in a monoplane on 25 July 1909. During a press conference after the crossing he said, "Whether this is a historic event or not, I’m not the one to decide that, time will tell".

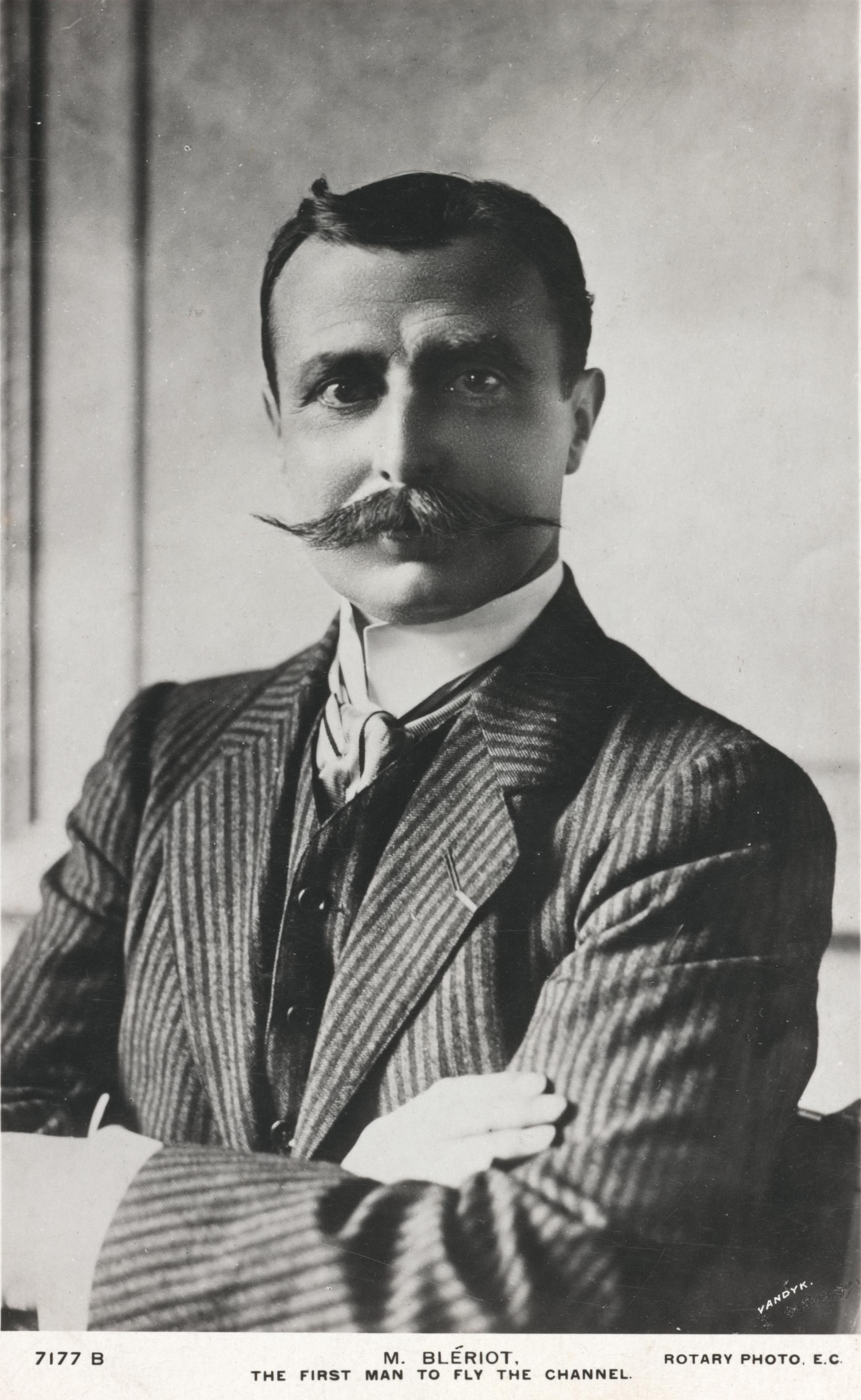
Louis Blériot, the founder of Blériot Aéronautique, a successful aircraft manufacturing company, became world-famous for first man to fly the Channel, winning the prize of £1,000 (worth £152,113 in 2025) offered by the Daily Mail newspaper. The photo represents him c. 1911.

Zapata's company, Z-AIR, had received a €1.3 million grant from the French military. However, he has said that the flyboard was not yet ready for military use due to the noise it creates and the challenge of learning how to fly the device. In a France Inter radio interview, France's Minister of the Armed Forces Florence Parly said the flyboard might eventually be suitable, "for example as a flying logistical platform or, indeed, as an assault platform".

In 2017, Zapata had provided the U.S. Army with demonstrations of the Flyboard Air "jet-powered hoverboard" or "jet-powered personal aerial vehicle", referred to as the EZ-Fly; news reports suggested the price per unit might be $250,000. A July 2019 report provided no indication of any serious interest by the US military as of that time for this new technology.

== See also ==
- Hoverboard
- Flyboard, a hydroflight hoverboard hydrojetpack
- JetLev
- Jet pack
