= Lindsay McQueen =

Spanish hydroflight athlete

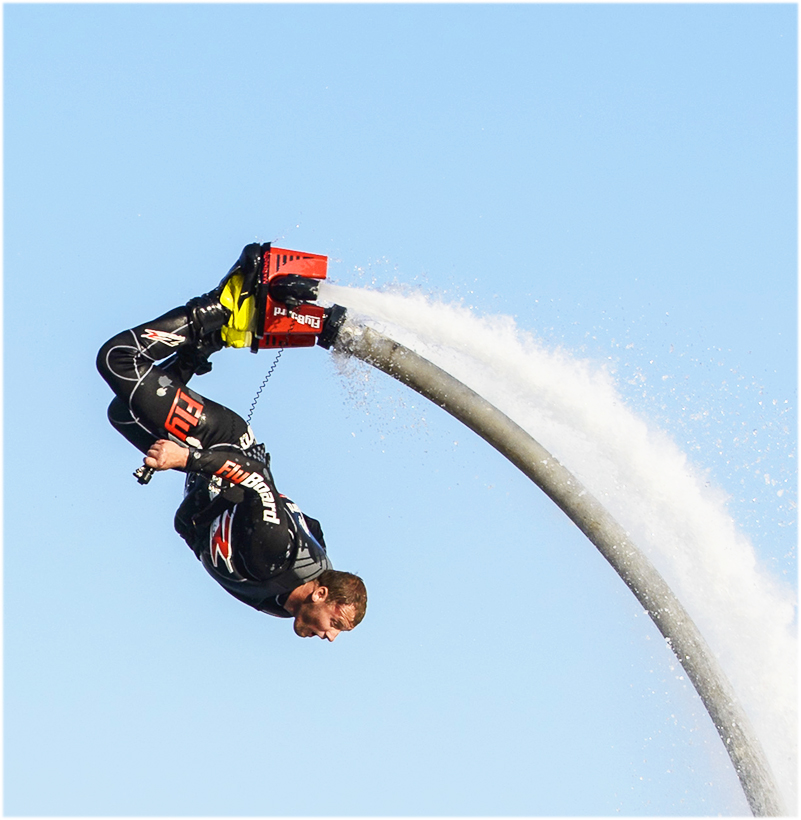
Lindsay McQueen proving his skill by doing a backflip on a FlyBoard. (9 February 2014)

Lindsay McQueen (Villajoyosa, Spain, 28 May 1979) is a hydroflight athlete. He has been involved with the company FlyBoard since it was set up by a French watercraft rider, Franky Zapata, in 2011.

He has taken part in all World Championships to date, Qatar (2012), Qatar (2013) and Dubai (2014). His best result was in 2012, when he came in 5th place, disqualified by a head-to-head battle in quarterfinals by Stéphane Prayas from France, who went on to become the World Champion of that year.

He lives and trains in Ibiza.

== Early life and education ==
At age 5 he started water-skiing at the Cable Ski Benidorm in his home town in Benidorm (Alicante) and at age 8 he started to compete for the Spanish water-ski team in the category of slalom, achieving various Spanish champion titles.

At age 13 he moved to Nottingham, UK to study. After finishing his studies at Carlton le Willows Academy, he moved back to Spain and at age 19 started water-skiing professionally again and working as an instructor at Cerro de Alarcón water-ski school in Madrid.

He was one of the first wakeboarders in Spain, and was the winner of the first Spanish national Wakeboard Championship held at Casa de Campo, Madrid. At age 29 he moved to Ibiza, Spain where he worked with businesses related to water-sports, and in 2012 when French watercraft rider Franky Zapata invented the FlyBoard he signed the exclusivity for Spain.

== Career ==
As a FlyBoard instructor, McQueen has instructed many celebrities, including Tom Cruise, Leonardo DiCaprio, and Vin Diesel.

== Performances and media ==
=== Competitions ===
- 1988. Water-skiing Spanish national champion in the Alevin category
- 1989. Water-skiing Spanish national champion in the Alevin category
- 1990. Water-skiing Spanish national champion in the Alevin category
- 1991. Water-skiing Spanish national champion in the Alevin category
- 1998. First Wakeboard Spanish national champion at Casa de Campo, Madrid
- 2012. FlyBoard World Cup 5th place at Doha, Qatar
- 2013. FlyBoard World Cup disqualified in first round for "flipping" the Jet ski, new rule for that year.
- 2014. FlyBoard World Cup 10th place after first round at Dubai, UAE

=== Advertisements ===
In 2016, McQueen appeared in an advertisement for Fisherman's Friend menthol lozenges.

=== Shows ===
In 2022, McQueen hosted a FlyBoard show at TEKNOFEST Azerbaijan.
