= Hoverboard =

Fictional or hypothetical, self-levitating board

- Back to the Future film series element
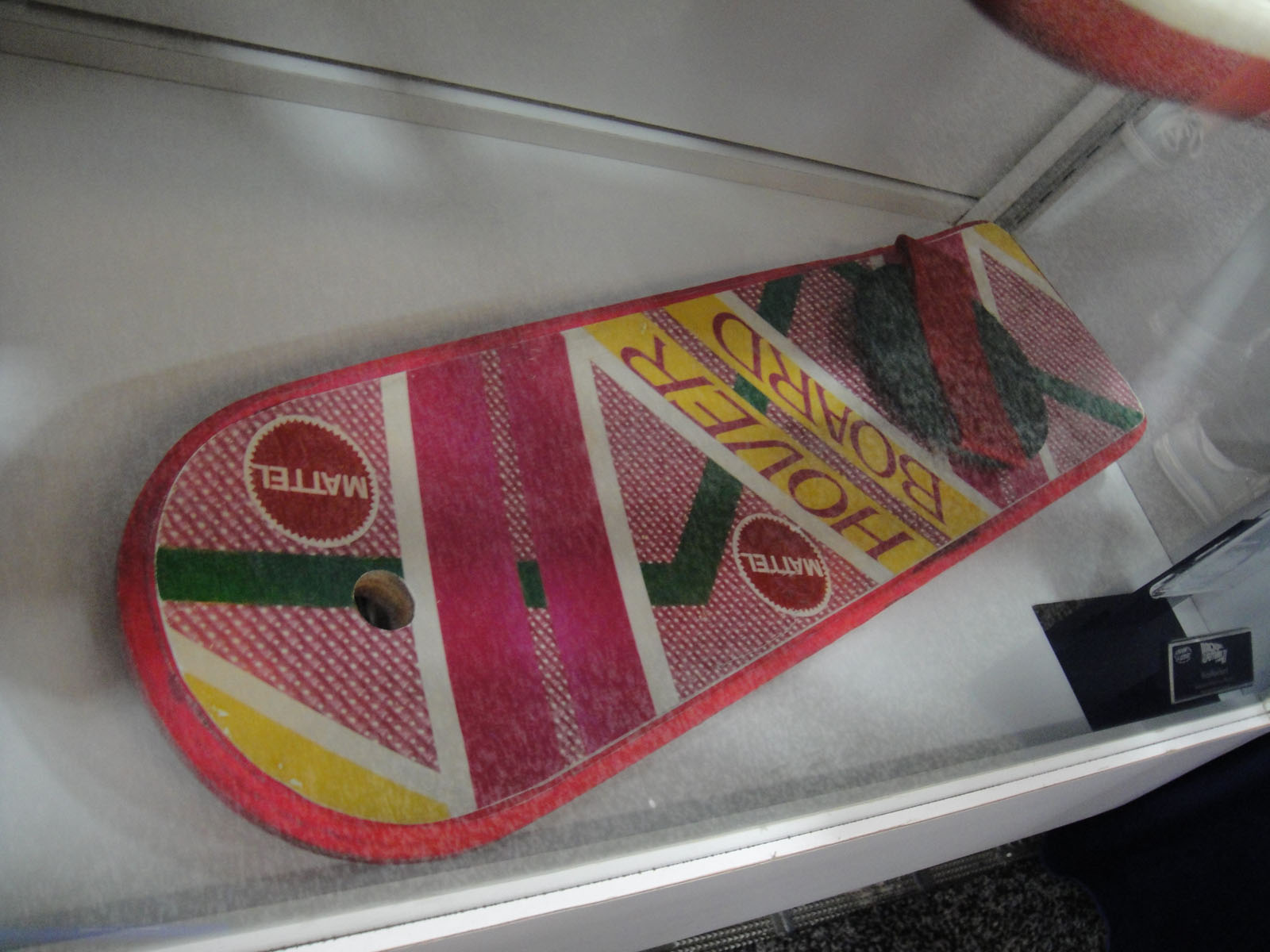
- Fictional Mattel hoverboard used by the character Marty McFly in both Back to the Future Part II (1989) and Back to the Future Part III (1990).
- Publisher: Amblin Entertainment
- First appearance: Back to the Future Part II
- Created by: Robert Zemeckis; Bob Gale
- Genre: Science-fiction

In-universe information
- Type: Personal transport
- Function: Personal transportation similar to a skateboard, but using a magnetic means of levitation instead of wheels.

A hoverboard (or hover board) is a fictional levitating board used for personal transportation, first described in science-fiction, and made famous by the appearance of a skateboard-like hoverboard in the film Back to the Future Part II (1989). Many attempts have been made to invent a functioning hoverboard.

== In fiction ==
Hoverboards were first described by author M. K. Joseph in a 1967 science fiction novel. In 1984, a hoverboard appeared in the shoot 'em up arcade video game SWAT, developed by Coreland and distributed by Sega in Japan and Bally Midway in North America.

The hoverboard was popularized by the Back to the Future film franchise, with its appearance in Back to the Future Part II (1989). During the 1990s there were rumors, fueled by the film's director Robert Zemeckis, that hoverboards were in fact real, but not marketed because they were deemed too dangerous by parents' groups. These rumors have been conclusively debunked.

Hoverboards have appeared in various other media since the 1990s. For example, video games such as the beat 'em up arcade game Riding Fight (1992), manufactured by Taito, and the sports video game AirBlade (2001), developed by Criterion Games and distributed by Sony in Europe and Namco in North America. Hoverboard races also appear in the video game Ratchet & Clank (2016).

A short film, Flite, designed to showcase the capabilities of the Unreal Engine game design tool was created by writer and director Tim Webber in 2023. The narrative concerns a young hoverboard rider being chased through a near-future London.

== Prototypes ==
Numerous attempts have been made to create working hoverboards.

=== Air cushion or ground effect ===
Several companies have drawn on hovercraft "air-cushion vehicle" technology to attempt to create hoverboard-like products but none have demonstrated similar experiences to the kinds of levitation depicted in science fiction films.

In the 1950s, Hiller aircraft produced the "Flying Platform" which was similar to the modern concept of a hoverboard.

The Airboard air-cushion vehicle was unveiled in the 2000 Summer Olympics Opening Ceremony in Sydney, which was manufactured and sold by Arbortech Industries Limited. Series II was unveiled in 2007.

In 2004, Jamie Hyneman and his team built a makeshift hovercraft for MythBusters, dubbed the Hyneman Hoverboard, from a surfboard and leafblower. However, Jamie's hoverboard was not very effective.

In 2005, Jason Bradbury created a "hoverboard" for The Gadget Show, using a wooden board that was levitated by means of a leafblower. The original design was not propelled and could also not be steered. In 2009, a second version was made which was propelled/steered by a small jet engine (rather than a fan as with an air boat), and also contained two (more powerful) leafblowers.

In May, 2015, Guinness World Records announced that the Romania-born Canadian inventor Cătălin Alexandru Duru had set a new record for continuous travel as a controlling pilot on an autonomously powered hoverboard, travelling over a distance of 275.9 m (302 yd) at heights up to 5 m (16 ft) over Lake Ouareau in the province of Quebec, Canada. Video of the flight leading to a controlled splash-down is offered. Duru had designed and constructed the hoverboard himself over the course of a year. Its lift is generated by propellers, and the pilot controls the craft with his feet.

On 24 December 2015, ARCA Space Corporation claimed it developed a hoverboard named ArcaBoard, and the batteries can provide energy enough for six minutes of hovering at height of up to 30 centimeters (12 in). It has 36 electric motors that power 36 fans.

In April 2016, a jet powered Flyboard Air hoverboard, flown by inventor Franky Zapata broke the Guinness World Record for farthest flight by hoverboard, flying 2,252.4 meters (2,463.3 yd).

In July 2019, Franky Zapata flew the newer Flyboard Air "jet-powered personal aerial vehicle", referred to as the EZ-Fly, during Bastille Day celebrations in France. On 4 August 2019, Zapata succeeded in crossing the English Channel with his device. The previous attempt on 25 July had been unsuccessful, but during the second try, escorted by French Army helicopters and using a backpack fuel reservoir, he accomplished the 35-kilometer (22 mi) journey in about 20 minutes, including a fueling stop at the midpoint. Zapata reached a speed of 180 km/h (110 mph) and maintained an altitude of approximately 15 meters (50 ft).

Zapata's company, Z-AIR, had received a €1.3m development grant from the French military in December 2018. However, he has said that the flyboard was not yet suitable for military use due to the noise it creates and the challenge of learning how to fly the device.

=== Magnetic ===
In 2011, French artist Nils Guadagnin created a hovering board that floats by magnetic repulsion between it and its base but cannot carry a load. The board includes a laser system which ensures stabilization, in addition to an electromagnetic system which makes the levitation possible.

In October 2011, the Université Paris Diderot in France presented the "Mag surf", a superconducting device which levitates 3 cm (1.2 in) above two magnetized repulsing floor rails and can carry up to 100 kg (220 lb).

In October 2014, American inventor Greg Henderson demonstrated a prototype hoverboard working on a magnetic levitation system using the electrodynamic wheel principle. Similar to maglev trains, the hoverboard requires a surface of non-ferromagnetic metal such as copper or aluminum to function, carrying up to 140 kg (300 lb) while hovering 2.5 cm (1 in) above the surface. Four engines were used to power the magnetic levitation, with the option of applying thrust and spin to the board under user control. The prototype was promoted in a campaign on Kickstarter the day of the news coverage, with a price of $10,000 for the first ten boards. The New York Times said that although the board worked, Greg Henderson had no personal interest in skateboarding and that the Kickstarter was "basically a publicity stunt," designed to call attention to his company.

On June 24, 2015, Lexus released a video as part of their "Amazing in Motion" series purporting to show a real hoverboard they had developed, the Slide. It was stated by Lexus that the board worked using liquid-nitrogen-cooled superconductors and permanent magnets. The board was shown moving over a conventional-looking concrete skateboard park surface, which led to some skepticism. Lexus apparently later admitted that it only works on special metallic surfaces and the surface shown was not just concrete. On August 4, 2015, Lexus revealed the working principles of the Slide hoverboard with a promotional campaign, filmed in Barcelona and starring Ross McGouran, a professional London skateboarder. Lexus released a series of videos explaining the technology and the whole engineering, research, and development process in association with all its partners.

On January 7, 2021, the YouTube channel Hacksmith Industries uploaded a video of a functional hoverboard capable of sustaining the weight of a human. It uses several electrodynamic wheels to induce eddy currents on an aluminum plate floor.

On March 22, 2023, a French amateur named Damien Dolata launched on YouTube his first functional version of a hoverboard called Ripulse. This hoverboard is capable of levitating a person weighing up to approximately 30 kg above the ground. It is composed of 4 magneto-rotational repulsors that create an eddy current in a conductive surface.

=== Other ===
In March 2014, a company called HUVr claimed to have developed the technology for hoverboards, and released a video advertising the product on YouTube featuring Christopher Lloyd, Tony Hawk, Moby, Terrell Owens, and others riding hoverboards through a parking lot in Los Angeles. Special effect failures such as incomplete wire removal have conclusively identified the video as a hoax or joke, traced to the Funny or Die website through identification of the cast and public references to the project. Funny or Die later posted a video featuring Christopher Lloyd "apologizing" for the hoax.

Rumors circulated in 2001 that inventor Dean Kamen's new invention, codenamed Ginger, was a transportation device resembling a hoverboard. In reality, Ginger was the Segway Human Transporter, a self-balancing two-wheel electric scooter.

== Guinness records ==
Guinness World Records defines a hoverboard as an autonomously powered personal levitator.

In May 2015, the Romanian-born Canadian inventor Cătălin Alexandru Duru set a Guinness World Record by travelling a distance of 275.9 m (302 yd) at heights up to 5 m (16 ft) over a lake, on an autonomously powered hoverboard of his own design.

On April 30, 2016, Guinness World Records recognized a new record of 2,252.4 m (2,463.3 yd). The Flyboard Air was powered by jet engine propulsion, and its use allowed Franky Zapata, in Sausset-les-Pins, France to beat the previous record by nearly 2 km (2,200 yd).

== In popular culture ==
=== Back to the Future ===
Back to the Future franchise: Marty McFly (Michael J. Fox) rides a Mattel hoverboard in Back to the Future Part II (1989), to escape Griff Tannen and his gang in the year 2015. Later on, Marty McFly would revisit 1955 and use the hoverboard to steal the Grays Sports Almanac book back from Biff Tannen, to prevent him from taking over Hill Valley.

In Part III (1990), in the year 1885, Doc Brown rides the hoverboard to rescue Clara from falling off the locomotive.

In the one-off special Doc Brown Saves the World, Brown reveals that he erased the existence of the hoverboard and other inventions from the 2015 shown in the series as they contributed to a chain of events that culminated in Griff Tannen triggering a nuclear holocaust.

- In a short film called Hoverboard (2011), a girl watches Part II and makes a hoverboard of her own.
- In Back to the Future: The Game, Marty uses a hoverboard to help Brown catch Edna Strickland.

=== Other ===
- In the 1986 The Transformers: The Movie, there is a scene where Daniel Witwicky rides a hoverboard.
- In the 1998 film Futuresport, a hoverboard is used by Dean Cain's character.
- In the Da Ali G Show episode "Politics" (2003), Ali G presents the hoverboard as his second business idea, displaying the deck of a skateboard.
- In the Warframe Fortuna Expansion, a new type of vehicle called a K-Drive was released. This vehicle functions exactly as a hoverboard.
- In the 2002 Disney animated film Treasure Planet, Jim Hawkins rides a hoverboard also known as a solar surfer with a sail doing daredevil stunts in the mines. Later on, he quickly constructs a hoverboard and uses it to reach the portal door controls before the titular planet explodes.
- In the 2004 CGI animated film Pinocchio 3000, Mayor Scamboli, Marlene, Cab, and Rodo all ride hoverboards at the opening of Scamboland.
- Several entries in the Sonic the Hedgehog video game series, most prominently Sonic Riders and its sequels, feature modified hoverboards used as racing vehicles.
- In the 1999 video game TrickStyle, the characters use hoverboards as a racing vehicle.
- In the 2012 mobile game Subway Surfers, a "hoverboard" is used as the character's vehicle. There are many variations of the hoverboard in-game including "Teleporter", "Hot Rod", "Bouncer" and others.
- In the 2017 video game Destiny 2, a vehicle called a Skimmer was added in March 2024 during the event Guardian Games. It functions as a hoverboard which players can use to traverse across destinations and it has an ability to grind air. These were previously only seen used by non-player characters in the game's 2023 expansion Lightfall.
- The 2018-2025 podcast Six Minutes by Gen-Z Media features an AI-powered hoverboard as part of the storyline (named "Hovie"). The spinoff 2020-2021 podcast Remy’s Life… Interrupted also featured similar hoverboards (named "Hovie-2", "Hovie-3", and "Hovie-4").

== See also ==
- Flyboard – Brand of hydroflighting device
- Flying car – Car that can be flown in much the same way as a car may be driven
- Hoverbike – Personal vehicle capable of hovering
- Ionocraft – Electrohydrodynamic aircraft propulsion
- Jet pack – Device using jets to propel the wearer
- Lexus hoverboard – Maglev hoverboard demonstration
- Power trowel – Piece of light construction equipment
- Uncrewed vehicle – Type of vehicle
