= Lexus hoverboard =

Maglev hoverboard demonstration

The SLIDE is a magnetically levitating hoverboard demonstration developed by Lexus, who built a skate park in Barcelona, Spain specifically for the project. The system was built as a promotional demonstration and was not on sale to the public.

== Conception ==
The overall project took about 57 weeks to complete. The SLIDE was teased in June 2015 and was officially revealed 5 August of the same year. Dietmar Berger, a magnetic levitation engineer, and Ludwig Schultz, an engineer of superconducting levitation, were mostly responsible for the design of the system. Professional skateboarder Ross McGouran was the main rider for both prototype testing and promotional demonstration.

== Technology ==
The main focus of the demonstration is the levitation of the hoverboard, which was achieved through the use of superconductors inside the board and a magnetic track. The board itself was made of bamboo and carbon fibre support structures. The board had 32 yttrium barium copper oxide superconductors cooled by liquid nitrogen.

Superconductors are conductors that have no internal resistance as long as they are kept below a certain temperature based on the particular material. When a metal has no internal resistance, a current running through the metal will run forever without a power source. When a superconductor is subjected to a magnetic field, the superconductor aligns itself with the magnetic field and can remain in a fixed position above it. In order to maintain the required temperature, this system uses liquid nitrogen to cool it down to −197 °C (76.1 K; −322.6 °F). Because of the transfer of heat energy from the magnets to the liquid nitrogen, the nitrogen boils and eventually evaporates away. This makes it difficult to have a constant supply of liquid nitrogen to continually cool down the superconductors, and the system can only operate for an average time of about 20 minutes on maximum liquid nitrogen onboard capacity.

== Track ==
The track built by Lexus for the SLIDE project is in Cubelles, Barcelona, Spain. The entire skate park has magnetic tracks concealed beneath a thin layer of wood. The magnetic track pulls the board along the path. All the uphill and downhill slopes of the track were specifically designed to ensure the magnetic field has enough momentum to maintain the board's movement.
