= Franky Zapata =

French personal watercraft pilot (born 1978)

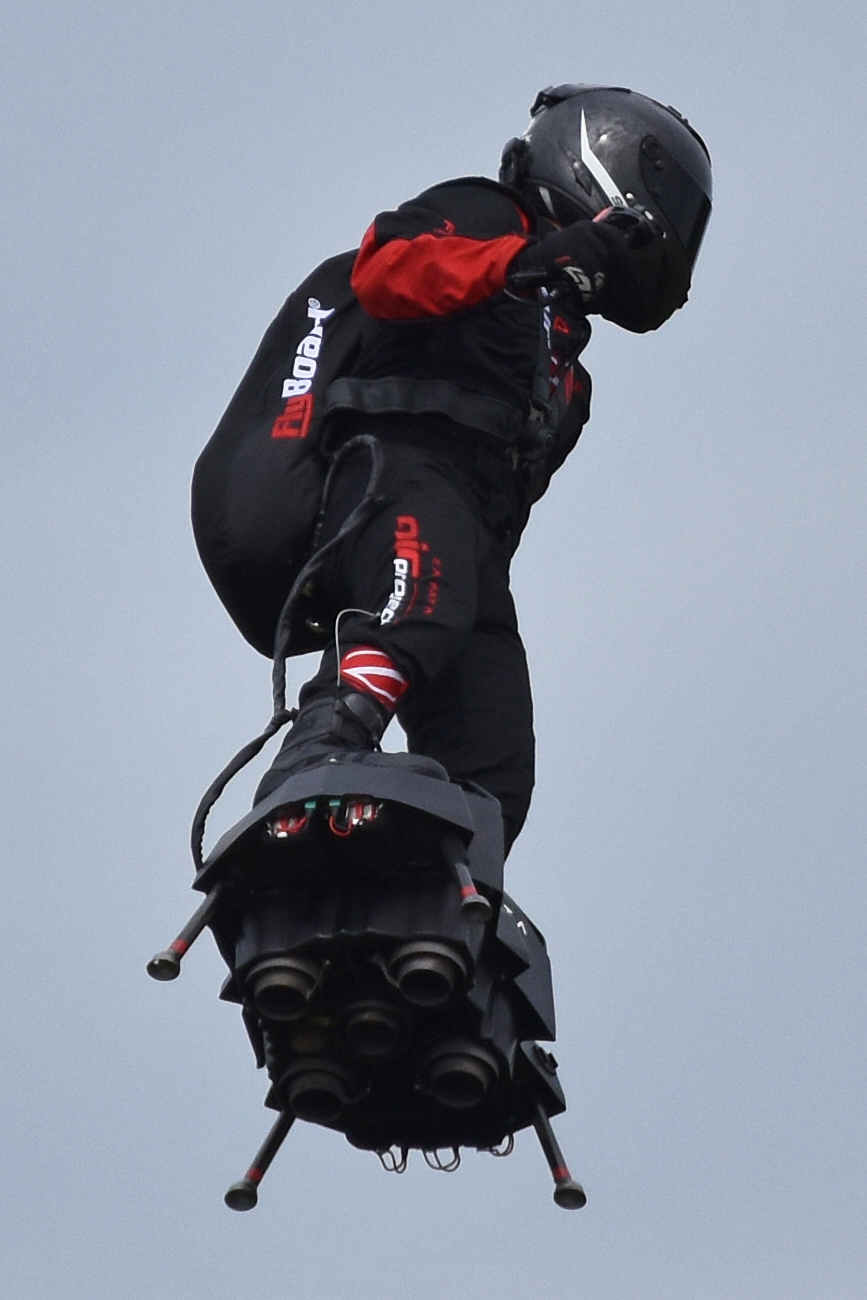
- Zapata in June 2019
- Born: September 27, 1978 (age 47)
- Occupation: Pilot

Franky Zapata (French pronunciation: [fʁɑ̃ki zapata]; born 27 September 1978) is a French personal watercraft pilot who is the inventor of the Flyboard and Flyboard Air, and founder of Zapata Racing. Since 2012, Zapata's efforts have been focused on the development and manufacture of personal flyers for land and aquatic applications.

On 4 August 2019, Zapata crossed the English Channel in 22 minutes, with a refuelling stop at midpoint, on a Flyboard Air. His 35-kilometre (22 mi) journey was completed with an escort from several French helicopters and warships, and aided by a backpack fuel reservoir.

== Biography ==
Franky started using a Jet Ski at the age of 16. He has won the RUN F1 World Championship several times. After many years of making personal watercraft (PWC), he invented the Flyboard.

He completed an apprenticeship as a mechanic. After gaining experience in jet skiing through competitions and in particular Aquabike World Championship (powerboating), he and his father Claude founded Zapata Racing in 1998 as a high-performance PWC competition team. He shaped shells, steering, arm and saddle-VNM and tuned machines for jet ski races. He has won in PWC competition several European championships and two world champion titles. His Zapata Racing Team develops PWC related products.

== Personal life ==
He is married to Christelle, and has a son Matt.

== Zapata Racing Gear ==
Zapata started with a budget of 20,000 euros to develop the Flyboard. After several prototypes, he finally managed to stabilize the flyboard by means of underfoot and a hand stabilization in the air. After patenting the invention, he presented the Flyboard for the first time during the World Cup in China. The first flights were recorded and posted on YouTube and received 2.5 million views in 15 days.

In 2016, Zapata sold Zapata Racing (ZR) to U.S. defense contractor Implant Sciences. In 2017, he provided the U.S. Army with demonstrations of the Flyboard Air (jet-powered hoverboard). A July 2019 news report provided no indication of any serious interest as of that time for the flyboard technology.

=== Hoverboard by ZR ===
Hoverboard by ZR, invented in 2014, was a mix between a surfboard and a skateboard. It is operated by a remote-controlled personal watercraft which powers a water pump. The hoverboard has been discontinued.

=== JetPack by ZR ===
The JetPack is powered by water pumped from a personal watercraft (under remote control) via a tube connected to two nozzles on the flyer. The system allows the user to fly in a seated, secured position and is less dependent on the rider’s balance and dexterity to fly. The JetPack is so stable that, once in the air, a user can let go of the controls and stay flying in a hovering position.

=== Flyboard Air ===
in April 2016, Zapata unveiled the Flyboard Air, a flight surfboard powered by four micro-turbines equipped with stabilizers to provide its pilots with approximately 140 km/h (87 mph) ten minutes of flight time. In March 2017, there was a media incident: Zapata flew a Flyboard Air near Marseille Provence Airport and Airbus Helicopters in Marignane, much to the discomfort of the local flight authority. The Flyboard Air can fly autonomously as a plane and is subject to regulations governing the overflight of airspace. Zapata flew unknowingly at this time, which led to the official threat of a flight ban and temporarily threatened the further development. Zapata used the incident to raise consumer and investor awareness. By negotiating with the relevant authorities, including the military, he was allowed to continue development. Further development is planned in the areas of leisure, entertainment, military, medicine and industry.

Zapata's company, Z-AIR, had received a €1.3m grant from the French military in December 2018. However, he has said that the flyboard was not yet suitable for military use due to the noise it creates and the challenge of learning how to fly the device.

In 2017, Zapata had provided the U.S. Army with demonstrations of the Flyboard Air (jet-powered hoverboard) referred to as the EZ-Fly in some news reports, which suggested the price per unit might be $250,000. A July 2019 report provided no indication of any serious interest by the American military as of that time for this new technology.

On 5 August 2019, Zapata said that he was working on a flying car and had flown a prototype chassis powered by four gas turbines. "I need to finish building my flying car, I need to introduce it before the end of the year", he told BFM TV after his English Channel crossing.

On July 14, 2019, Franky Zapata participated in the Bastille Day military parade riding his invention, the so-called "jet-powered hoverboard"; that model was powered by five turbines and fueled by kerosene.

On 25 July 2019, Zapata attempted to cross the English Channel from Sangatte, France to St Margaret's Bay, near Dover, England using his Flyboard Air powered by five small jet turbines. The attempt required a mid-air refueling stop on a boat positioned in the Channel. Zapata successfully took off, but the refueling platform was moving due to waves, and he fell into the sea during the attempt, resulting in its failure.

Zapata made a second attempt on 4 August 2019, after modifying the refueling procedure and using a larger boat. On this attempt he successfully completed the crossing in around 22 minutes, maintaining an average speed of approximately 170 km/h (110 mph) at a height of 15–20 meters (50–65 ft) above the water. He landed safely on British soil, becoming the first person to cross the English Channel using a jet-powered hoverboard.

The trip started at Sangatte in the Pas de Calais region of France and concluded at St Margaret's at Cliffe in Kent, UK where he landed safely.

When reporters compared his journey to the first cross-channel flight by Louis Blériot in a monoplane on 25 July 1909, Zapata told BFM television: "It’s not really comparable, he was one of the first men to fly. Let’s just say that I achieved my dream". During a press conference after the crossing he also said, "Whether this is a historic event or not, I’m not the one to decide that, time will tell".

=== Airscooter ===
In mid-2025, Franky Zapata expanded his aviation ambitions by flying the AirScooter, a hybrid-electric vertical take-off aircraft developed by his company. In July, he attempted a new crossing of the English Channel from Sangatte (France) to the UK aboard this craft. A technical fault forced an early sea‐landing despite safety backup systems; Zapata declared his intent to retry the feat before September. Meanwhile, his company announced plans to open a public “Flight Centre” in the United States (Las Vegas area) in early 2026, offering flights on the AirScooter without requiring a full pilot licence.

== Competitive accomplishments ==
- 1996: champion national SKI Stock
- 1997: 3rd at the World Rally Championships raid Oléron RUN F1
- 1998: champion European national championships RUN F1
- vice-champion du Monde Rallye Raid Oléron RUN F1
- 1999: European champion RUN F1
- 2000: Tour US RUN F1.
- 2001: King of Bercy - Paris RUN F1
- 2003: European vice-champion RUN F1
- 2004: European vice-champion RUN F1
- 3rd at the World Rally Championships raid Oléron RUN F1
- 2005: European Champion RUN F1
- 2006: European Champion RUN F1, Vice World Rally Champion Oléron Rally RUN F1
- 2007: European champion RUN F1, champion World Rally Championships raid Oléron RUN F1, vice-champion world de F1 SKI World Finals
- 2008: European Champion RUN F1, World Champion RUN F1 World Finals, 3rd in world championships F1 SKI World Finals
- 2009: vice-champion world F1 SKI, winner of the Cavalaire enduro Jet-Ski F1
- 2010: European Champion RUN F1
