= JetLev =

Water-propelled jetpack

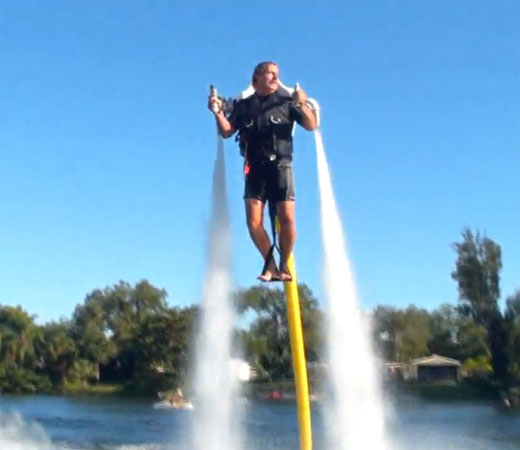
A JetLev jetpack in use

The JetLev is a water-propelled jet pack powered through a floater derived from jetski technology attached through an umbilical to the backpack which contains two nozzles and two control arms, in a configuration like traditional rocket belts and gas turbine jet belts. The JetLev also functions underwater, allowing users to dive into the water and jet back out. The jetpack can allow users to fly up to 10 m (30 feet) above the water. It was created by Chinese Canadian, Raymond Li. JetLev became the first practical amateur-usable jet pack, and first with practical usable duration. The JetLev technology jetpack became the first commercially released jetpack in 2009. It was initially offered for sale for $100,000, however with much cheaper competitors coming on the market afterwards, inspired by the original JetLev, such as the Flyboard, prices rapidly dropped, with cheaper models.

== History ==
Raymond Li started working on the concept in 2000. By 2003, he was seeking funding to keep developing the concept. He received a grant from the National Research Council of Canada. The prototype jetpack attached to a jetski, first flew carrying a person in 2004. In 2005, Li moved part-time to Fort Lauderdale on a temporary work visa to continue development with assistance from jetski experts. Hydroflight patents were issued to Raymond Li in 2008, and passed to the holding company JetLev Intellectual Property. Investors started calling Li in 2008. JetLev sued the makers of Flyboard, Jetovator, and manufacturers of other hydrojetpacks for patent infringement, starting in 2012. The intellectual property was bought by Zapata Industries, the maker of Flyboard, in 2016, consolidating the leading market hydroflight jetpacks in one company. Hydrojetpacks have raised concerns over safety and the need for regulations, since they started coming onto the market and into resorts. Jetpack Adventures in Australia was the first business to adapt the technology for use in the hire industry in the southern hemisphere in 2012. Located in Australia the company brought wide scale hire activities within Australia.

== See also ==
- Hydroflight sports, sports using water stream jet packs
- Flyboard, a water-propelled jetpack in the form of a hoverboard attached to a jetski by an umbilical
- Bell Rocketbelt, the original rocket-based jetpack
- Martin Jetpack, a paired ducted-fan style 'jet' pack
