= Hydroflight sports =

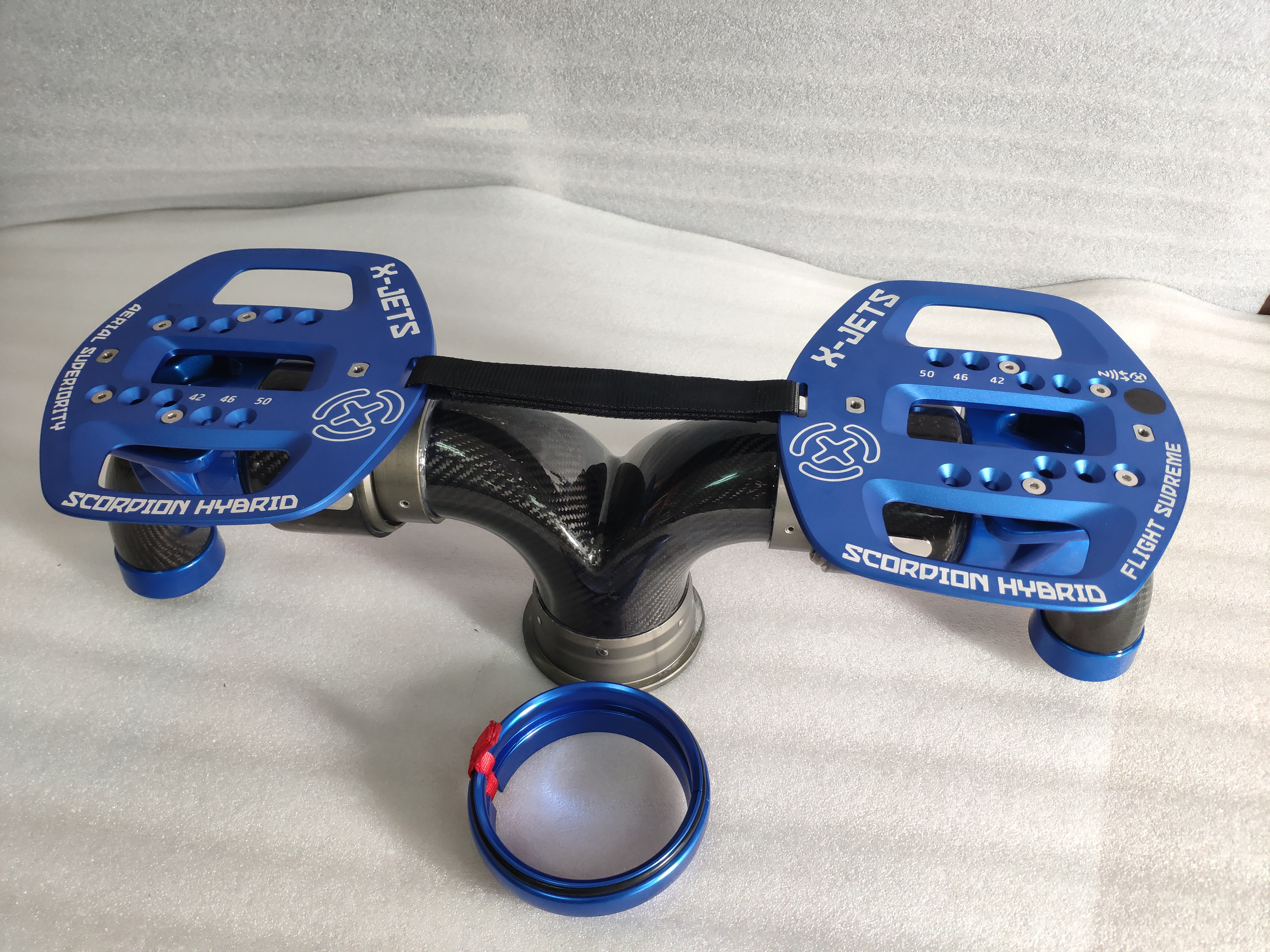
Jetboard, Scorpion Hybrid, by X-Jetpacks

Hydroflight sports are a category of sport in which water jet propulsion is used to create sustained flight where lift and movement are controlled by a person riding on a propulsion device. Competitions for this sport started around 2012. There are many training centres throughout the world where beginners go to learn and practice skills so they can fly these devices by themselves.

== Types of hydroflight equipment ==
There are many different types of Hydroflight products that are used for flying. The three most common types are the Jetboards, Jetpacks and Jetbikes, but there are others such as the Hoverboard and Freedom Flyer. Different varieties of jetboards are manufactured by different companies such as Jetblade, Flyboard, Defy X and Wataboard. This gives buyers a choice on which style board will suite their style of use.

=== Jetboard ===
The jetboard is a device that has two jets either side of the deck, on top of the deck is where the boots/bindings (generally wakeboarding boots) are bolted in and this is where the pilot will strap themselves into. The direction and control of the jetboard comes down to the amount of propulsion being applied, the angle of the feet are pointing and the distribution of bodyweight.

=== Jetpack ===
The jetpack is a device that is attached to the back with the two jets situated next to the shoulders. People are held to the device by a five-point safety/racing harness (same as the ones used in race car seats). The direction of flight is controlled using two handles that are attached to the jet nozzles.

=== Jetbike ===
The Jetbike is a device that has a motorcycle style seat and allows its pilot to fly in a position that replicates a motorcyclist's form. There is nothing to hold a person in but two small straps located on the foot pad. The bike has one main jet underneath the seat and two smaller jets located at the front of the bike which have handles attached to them to control the flight path.

=== Freedom flyer ===
The Freedom Flyer is a device which can actually be used by those who may suffer from a disability to the lower half of their body. The device is in the shape of a chair which has one main jet under the seat and two jets situated on either side of it which has handles attached to either side so the pilot can alter their flight path.

=== Hoverboard ===
The Hoverboard is a snowboard style device which only has one main jet situated underneath it. It is ridden with a side-on stance and is directed by the distribution of the pilot's own body-weight.

== Events/Competitions ==
- HydroJam & Expo
- Open Competitions:

Hydro Fest 2016 / Session One / FlyCup / Hydroflight World Championship / Louisiana Hydroflight Invitational

- Flyboard competitions, closed to only users of the Flyboard by Zapata Racing, since 2018 no longer held:

Flyboard European Championship 2016 / XDubai Flyboard World Cup 2015 / XDubai Hoverboard Race 2015 / North American Flyboard Championship 2015 / XDubai Flyboard World Cup 2014 / Flyboard World Cup 2013 / Flyboard World Cup 2012 / Japan Flyboard World Cup

Jetpack events have become a new segment of the hydroflight industry with an Australian business Jetpack Events incorporating fireworks and led lighting into the Hydroflight industry. Backpack type firework units are attached to flyers and triggered, whilst in flight for event entertainment. These pilots are typically dressed in an outer garment holding multiple led lighting strips to enable viewing of the pilot in these night events.

The only country where hydroflight is officially recognized as a sport is Russia. In 2019, it is one of the water-motor sports. In 2020, the first national championship and the Cup of Russia were held. https://iz.ru/1052172/2020-08-24/v-rossii-vpervye-v-mire-proshel-ofitcialnyi-natcionalnyi-chempionat-po-gidroflaitu

== Injuries ==
The risk of injury exists in hydroflight sports especially when the pilot starts to perform advanced movements. Injuries can occur any time of the flight or in the water environment.

- Hitting the pressurized hose at speed can cause concussion, bruising and broken bones.
- Moving water, river flow or strong tidal actions have posed the biggest danger to participants. When the jet ski and the floating rider move with the water, the 20+ meter long hose can hang up on underwater obstructions. This can pull the rider, and potentially the jet ski under water as the hose becomes taut. Deaths have occurred in this manner and hydroflight in moving water is strongly recommended against.
- Diving into the water presents the danger of breaking the neck, concussion, dislocation of shoulders, back or neck; if the pilot attempts to scoop the trajectory of the dive underwater against his current rotation he will be at serious risk of a back injury.
- Hitting the water flat (non-diving position) from a height of 10 meters will bring the pilot to a stop in a short distance which can cause serious bruising to the body and internal organs. It also strains the connective tissue securing the organs and possible minor haemorrhaging of lungs and other tissue is also possible.

While performing manoeuvres such as back flips or front flips the pilot can reach up to 4 Gs of force.

== World Hydroflight Association ==
The World Hydroflight Association (WHFA) is a worldwide organization representing, hydroflight participants, manufacturers, companies and fans. It exists to promote the sport of hydroflight via the safe, responsible operation of hydroflight devices. Unfortunately the WHFA was an early effort and no longer exists (since 2017). Currently 2021, there is no governing or standards body for hydroflight.

In Australia the representative body is the Aerial Watersports Association. It exists to promote the activities within Australia and to assist in the generation of new government requirements for the industry.

== See also ==
- Flyboard
- Jet ski fishing
- Personal watercraft
- Jetboat
- Jetboard
- Surfing
- Kiteboarding
- Kiteboating
