= Flyboard =

Brand of hydroflighting device

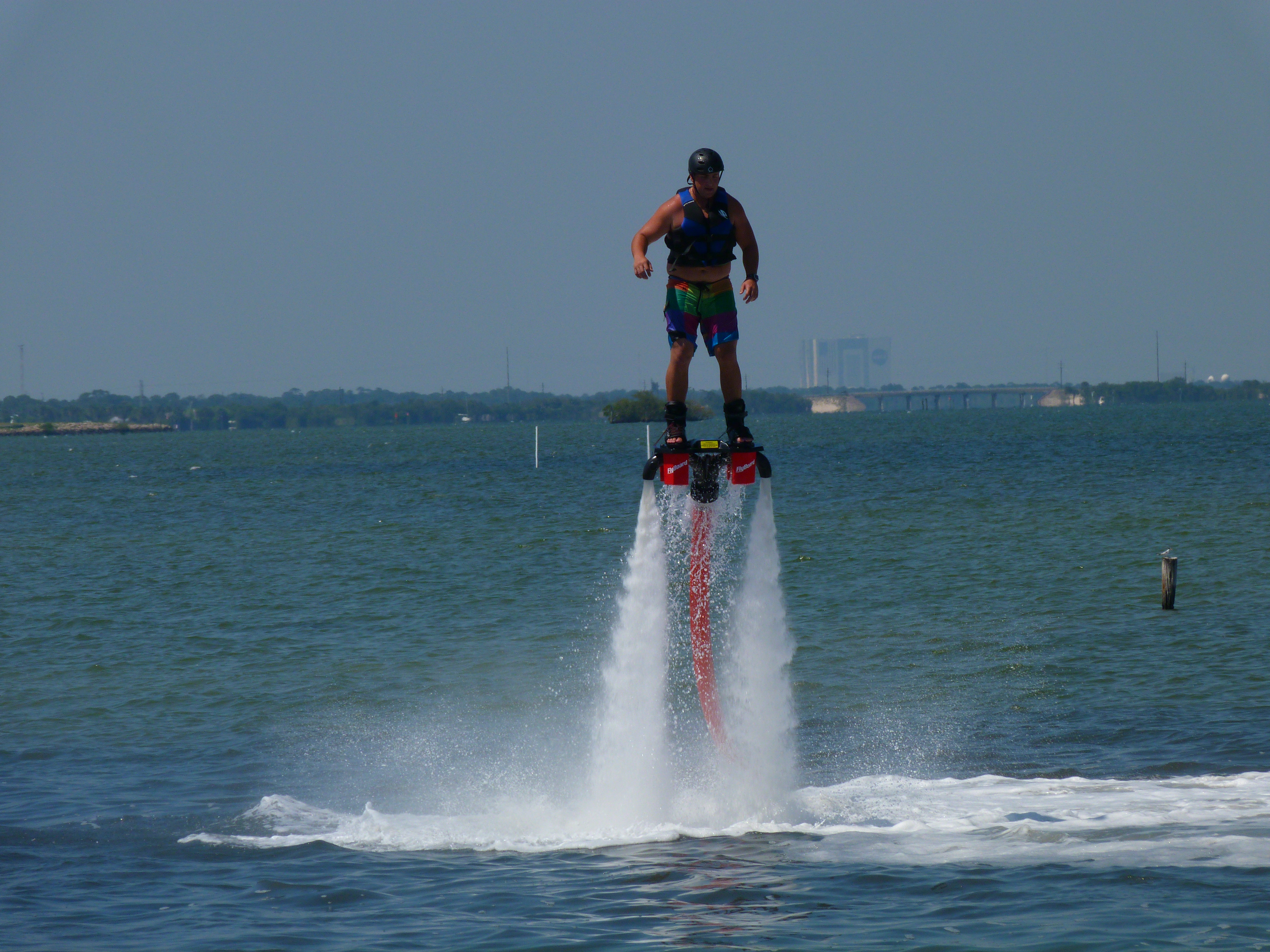
Flyboarding in Merritt Island, Florida

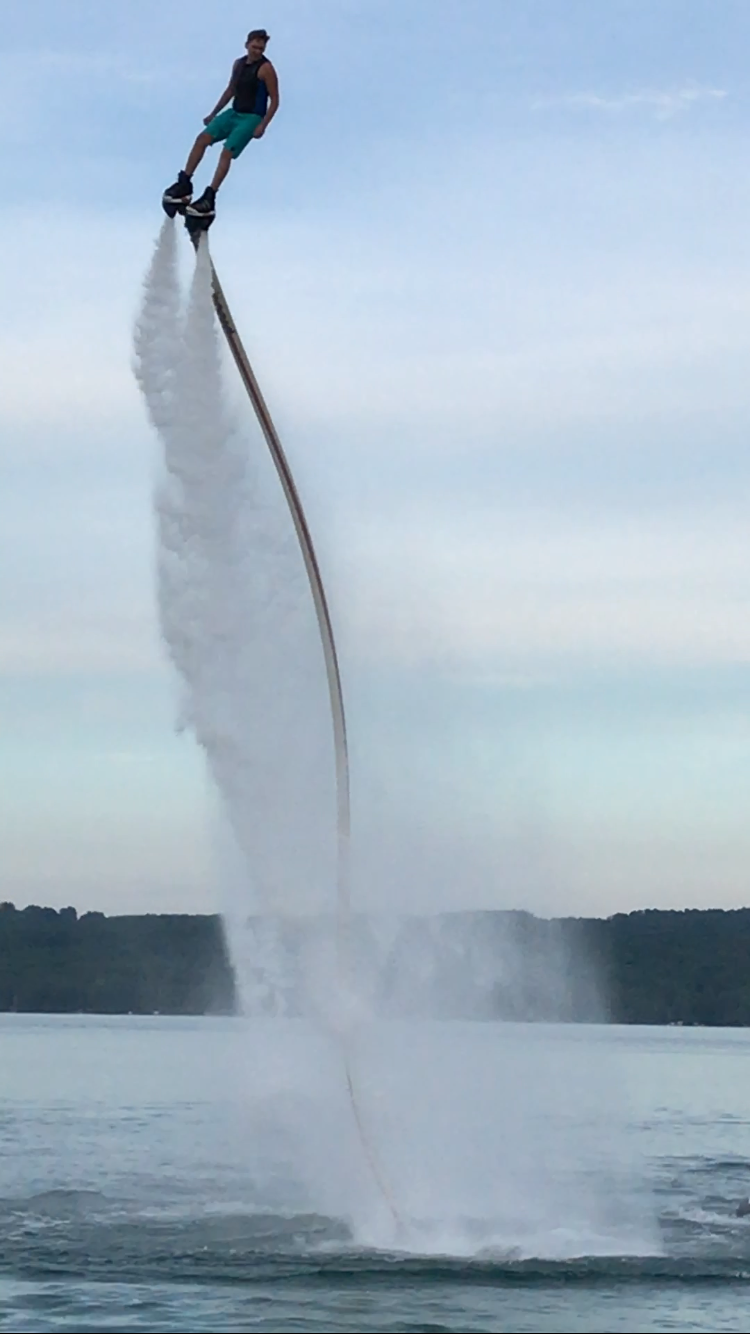
Athlete Oliver Winger Flyboarding in Grand Rapids, Michigan

A Flyboard is a brand of hydroflighting device which supplies propulsion to drive the Flyboard into the air to perform a sport known as hydroflying.

A Flyboard rider stands on a board connected by a long hose to a watercraft. Water is forced under pressure to a pair of boots with jet nozzles underneath which provide thrust for the rider to fly up to 22 m (72 ft) in the air or to dive headlong through the water down as far as one is willing to go.

== History ==
The Flyboard was invented in Autumn 2012 by a French water-craft rider, Franky Zapata. The design allows the device to climb out of the water and be stable in the air. This was achieved by the underfoot propulsion and hand stabilization. The French Institut national de la propriété industrielle (INPI) granted Zapata a patent for his invention. The Flyboard was the subject of a lawsuit from competitor Jetlev which was dropped without prejudice in March 2013. The device was presented to the public for the first time at the jet ski World Championship 2012 in China. Since its introduction in 2012 the Flyboard has sold around 2500 units.

In the 2015 season of America's Got Talent, a flyboard enthusiast named Damone Rippy performed Flyboarding as his act on the show.

In 2014 the first dual flight of a pilot with both a Jetlev Jetpack and Flyboard occurred in Sydney Australia at the Jetpack adventures facility by pilot Brad Hudson.

In 2016, Franky Zapata sold Zapata Racing (ZR) to U.S. defense contractor Implant Sciences.

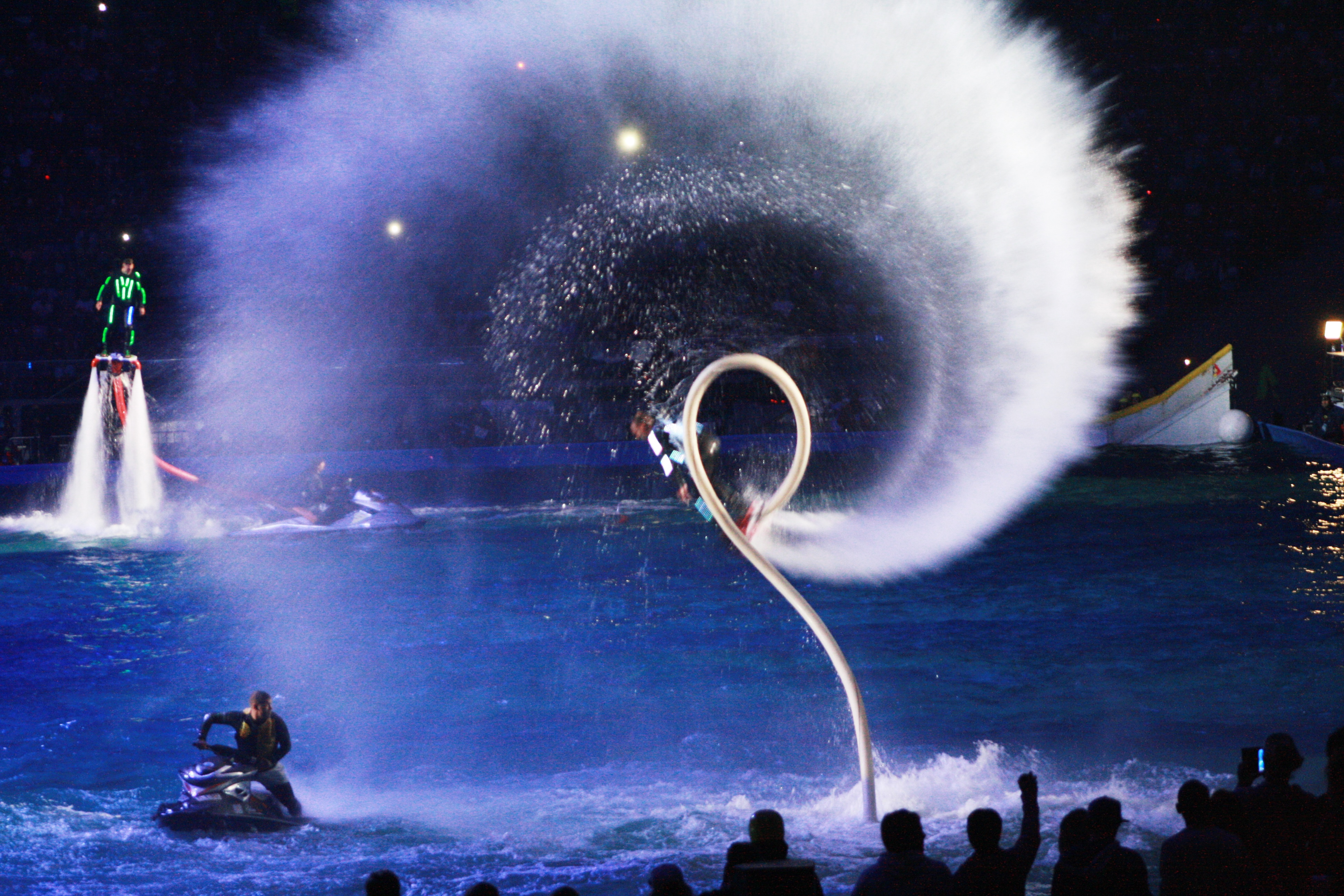
Acrobatics with flyboard

Flyboarding in Malmö, Sweden

=== Related aircraft ===
Zapata has also invented an independently jet-powered Flyboard (Flyboard Air), powered by five turbines and fueled by kerosene. He piloted the "jet-powered hoverboard" over crowds at the 2019 Bastille Day military celebrations in Paris. On 4 August 2019, Zapata was able to successfully fly over the English Channel after a failed attempt on 25 July.

During this flight, using a backpack fuel reservoir, he accomplished the 35-kilometre (22 mi) journey in about 20 minutes, including a fueling stop. Zapata reached a speed of 180 km/h (110 mph) and maintained an altitude of approximately 15 meters (49 feet).

Zapata's company, Z-AIR, had received a €1.3m grant from the French military in December 2018. However, he has said that the flyboard was not yet suitable for military use due to the noise it creates and the challenge of learning how to fly the device. In a France Inter radio interview, France's Minister of the Armed Forces Florence Parly said the flyboard might eventually be suitable, "for example as a flying logistical platform or, indeed, as an assault platform".

In 2017, Zapata had provided the U.S. Army with demonstrations of the Flyboard Air (jet-powered hoverboard) referred to as the EZ-Fly in some news reports, which suggested the price per unit might be $250,000. A July 2019 report provided no indication of any serious interest by the American military as of that time for this new technology.

== Technical information ==
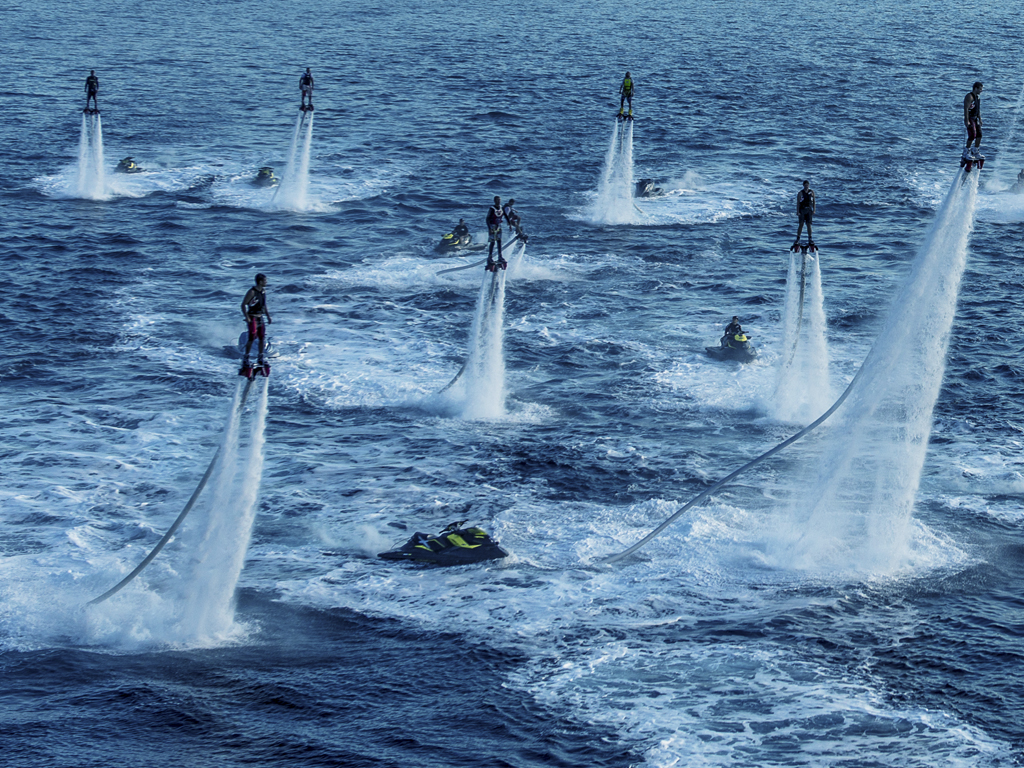
Flyboard practice

The Flyboard is a bolt-on device that is attached to a personal water craft (PWC). It is designed so that the PWC follows behind the rider’s trail, allowing the rider multiple degrees of freedom, even allowing the rider to go underwater if they desire. The pilot on the Flyboard is secured in by bindings similar to a wakeboard and the rider is propelled from water jets below the device. The Flyboard is buoyant for safety, which also allows the rider to rest in the water between rides. The use of a personal flotation device and helmet is required by rental locations for safety purposes to protect against serious head trauma in the event of the rider impacting the PWC or stationary structures, and to protect the ears from damage and discomfort from impacts with the water.

Device power is controlled by a throttle on the PWC. The equipment may be used in two modes: The primary one requires two people, one to control the PWC throttle which regulates the power and height of the rider. The secondary mode relies on an accessory called an Electronic Management Kit (EMK) which allows the rider to control the PWC throttle.

== Movies ==
A Flyboard was used as part of a stunt done in a Bollywood film by Hrithik Roshan titled Bang Bang!.

== See also ==
- Flyboard Air, a freeflight turbojet "hoverboard"
- Hydroflight sports, sports using water stream jet packs
- Hydrojet pack
- JetLev, the first commercial hydroflight jetpack
- Ben Merrell, hydroflighter
- Lindsay McQueen, a Flyboard athlete in Spain
