= Jetboard =

Characteristics, Use and History of Motorized Surfboards

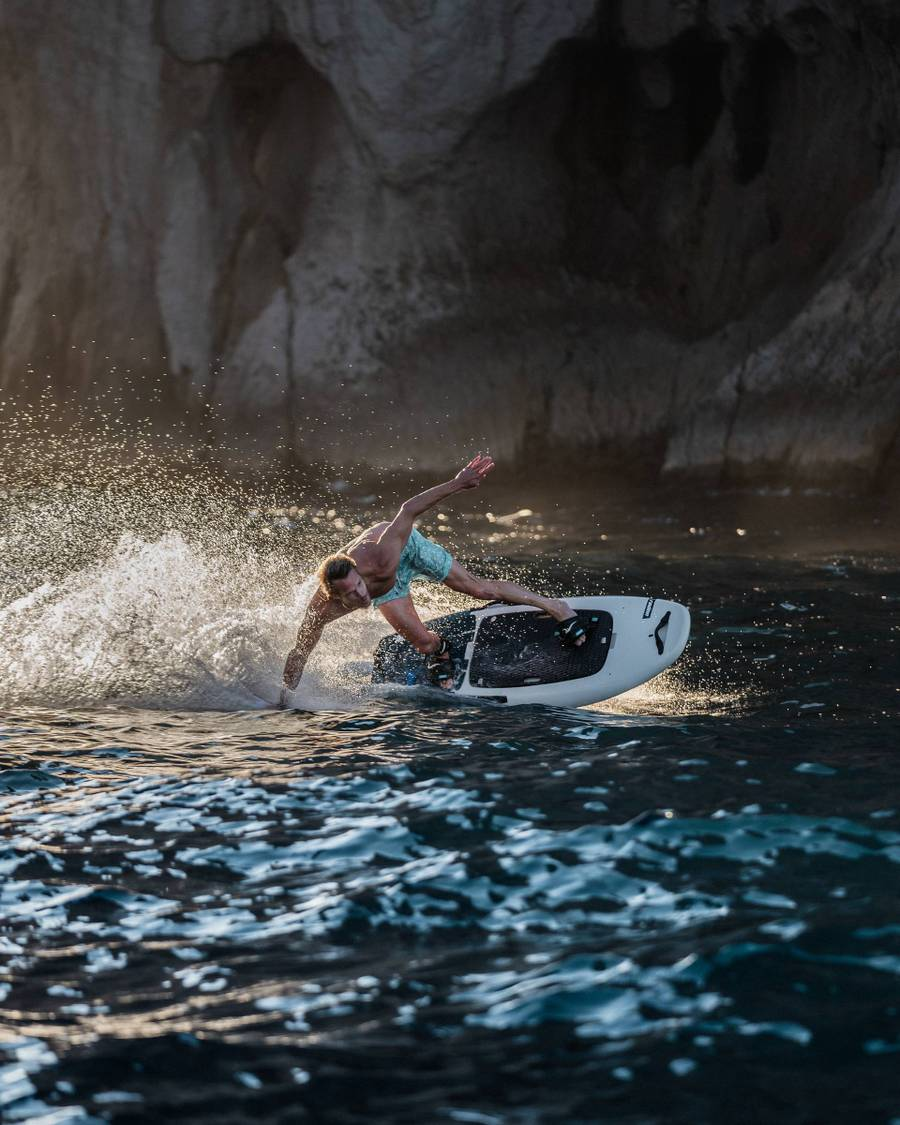
Jetboard in action

A jetboard is a motorized surfboard, where the rider controls the speed using a handheld remote control (wireless or tethered) and uses bodyweight transfer to maneuver the board. The driveline typically consists of a water jet module (similar to what is found in a personal watercraft), and either a combustion engine or a battery powered electrical motor. Serving as an alternative to standard surfboards, the jetboard also allows disabled athletes to engage in the sport.

== Use ==
Jetboards remove the difficulties of conventional surfboards as they can be ridden without wind or waves. There is also no need for paddling, as the boards can be ridden at the touch of a button. Compared to traditional surfing, jetboarding can be easily learned and allows the user to become proficient in a short time. This makes this water sport suitable for a large audience of different physical conditions, ages, experience levels and riding styles. In addition, jetboarding can take place on lakes, rivers, canals, seas and oceans alike, making it further accessible to larger groups of people. In addition to private ownership, rental operations are becoming available at resorts and boating hotspots. Furthermore, jetboards have found a niche as recreational accessories for yachts, sailing boats, and catamarans, adding to their appeal among water sports enthusiasts. Other opportunities outside of luxury such as use for disabled and adaptive athletes allow for the jetboard to have widespread use and influence a multitude of different groups.

Alongside other electrically powered board embodiments, such as efoils, jetboards are gaining in popularity worldwide and are poised to become a permanent addition to traditional water sports.

== History ==
Motorized surfboards have existed as hobbyist projects in various designs since at least the 1930s, originally in the shape of regular wooden surfboards with small engines attached. The first recognized board was known as the Surf Scooter, and was featured in a major Australian newspaper in 1935. Then came the Skimboat, which more resembled an actual boat rather than a surfboard. The board was powered by a 7 horse power engine, and weighed about 120 pounds. Despite its weight, it was able to be divided into three sections, making it portable. In the 1940s, Hollywood inventor Joe Gilpin decided he would try his own take on the motorized surfboard, but it never gained much traction. In the 1960s, the first commercially marketed jetboards were launched. The Jet Board, developed by Alfred Bloomingdale, is perhaps the most well-known. While it contains several features prominent in today's keyboards (such as a magnet leash kill-switch), it can be discussed whether the product was in fact a jetboard, seeing as its main purpose was to relieve a surfer of the paddling part of wave surfing. Another inventor, George Carter, introduced his product Surfjet in the same year. In the 1970s, Neil Townsend, after being diagnosed with a heart condition that threatened to end his surfing career, invented his own motorized propeller surfboard concept. His research helped pave the way for the innovations throughout the next two decades. Development of various motorized surfboards continued throughout the twentieth century, but it wasn't until electrification was introduced in the 2010s, that jetboards started to become relatively widespread. By means of electrical DC motors and rechargeable lithium-ion batteries, companies like Radinn, Lampuga, Jetsurf and Onean have been developing jetboards that are much easier to maintain and use, compared to their combustion engine ancestors, in addition to becoming very powerful and fast New innovations made on the jetboard allow for the aforementioned lithium-ion batteries to be swapped out when power is low, so that the user can continuously surf without having to go home and charge their board, and rather, they can just hit the beach, swap the battery, and continue surfing as they were

== Function ==
Jetboards commonly operate using a wireless controller, typically strapped to the hand, with a thumb throttle, controlling the power output to the motor at a given instance. A jetboard operates on an impeller system, which in essence, sucks water through as the board moves forward, and puts increased pressure on water as it exits the impeller system, thus generating thrust and propelling the board forward, relative to the given throttle control output.

== Adaptive Surfing ==
The development of jetboard technology has expanded opportunities for adaptive athletes to participate in surfing. Members of the adaptive surfing community often require specialized equipment or assistance from support crews to access and ride waves. Traditional surfing can present significant barriers for individuals with mobility impairments due to the physical demands of paddling, positioning, and wave entry.

By integrating an electric propulsion system directly into the board, jetboards eliminate the need for paddling and significantly reduce the physical barriers associated with surfing. This innovation enables individuals with a wide range of disabilities to independently access and enjoy the sport.

Jetboards have also created new opportunities for adaptive athletes who may never have been able to experience surfing through traditional means. In addition, they allow individuals who surfed prior to acquiring a disability to reconnect with a sport they once enjoyed. Organizations, charitable foundations, and crowdfunding platforms such as GoFundMe have further improved accessibility by helping adaptive surfers obtain funding for this technology, promoting greater inclusion within the surfing community regardless of financial circumstances.

== Competition ==
Since 2012, jetboarding races has been organized by the MotoSurf World Cup, based in Czechia. In the competitions, petrol powered and electric jetboards compete in separate classes. Notably, as of 2019, the sport gained official recognition from the Union International Motonautique (UIM), which itself has been recognized by the International Olympic Committee (IOC) since 2010. Competitors mainly use JETSURF boards, which are CE and EPA certified. Riders can compete in various categories, which include Elite, Stock, Stock R - Merlin Plus, Masters, Women, Junior Boy, Junior Girl, and Electric Challenge.

Regarding racing rules, the International Federation of Motorized Surfboards was established with the aim of promoting safe usage of motorized surfboards, regulating competition events, formulating rules, governing racing, and furthering the interests of its members. These rules are intended to provide a framework for fair and safe competition, with strict enforcement expected.

== See also ==
- Personal watercraft
- Electric skateboard
