= List of Antigua and Barbuda-flagged cargo ships =

This list of Antigua and Barbuda-flagged cargo ships consists of vessels which are registered in Antigua and Barbuda and subject to the laws of that country. Any ship which flew the flag at any point in its career, and is present in the encyclopedia, is listed here.

== List of ships ==
Name	Owner	Country	Year built	Type	Gross tonnage	Status
Anne Scan	NORDICA Schiffahrts	Germany	1996	General cargo	2,528	Chartered to take cargo from the Philippines following contraband seizure in 2009.
BBC China	Beluga Shipping	Germany	2000	General cargo	5,548	Ran aground off South African coast on 16 October 2004.
Emsmoon	Emsmoon NTH Schiffahrts	Germany	2000	General cargo	4,563	Collided with the Friesenbrücke railway bridge in Germany on 3 December 2015.
Francop	Francop Schiffahrts	Germany	2003	Container ship		Boarded by the IDF in the Francop Affair, in active service as the Russian-flagged Fesco Moneron.
RMS Mülheim	Kg CDL Leasing	Germany	1999	Bulk carrier	1,599	Ran aground at Land's End, England, on 22 March 2003.
