= Westoverledingen =

- Municipality
- Coat of arms

- Location of Westoverledingen within Leer district
- Interactive map of Westoverledingen
- Location within Germany Location within Lower Saxony
- Coordinates: 53°9′N 7°28′E
- Country: Germany
- State: Lower Saxony
- District: Leer
- Founded: 1973
- Subdivisions: 12 Subdivisions

Government
  - Mayor (2026–2034): Michael Ulrichs

Area
  - Total: 112.1 km^{2} (43.3 sq mi)
- Elevation: 4 m (13 ft)

Population (2025-12-31)
  - Total: 21,119
  - Density: 188.4/km^{2} (487.9/sq mi)
- Time zone: UTC+01:00 (CET)
  - Summer (DST): UTC+02:00 (CEST)
- Postal codes: 26810
- Dialling codes: 0 49 55
- Vehicle registration: LER
- Website: www.westoverledingen.de

Westoverledingen (German pronunciation: [ˌvɛstʔoːvɐˈleːdɪŋən], lit. 'West Overledingen') is a municipality in the Leer district in Lower Saxony, Germany.

It contains about a dozen villages. The biggest of them are Flachsmeer, Völlen and Ihrhove, where the town hall is located. Völlen lies at the southern edge of the municipality, close to the Meyer-Werft shipyard in Papenburg. Many villagers are employed there.

Most villages have interesting old churches, including five that date from the Middle Ages.

The Bundesstraße 70 the connects the municipality to Papenburg and Leer. Westoverledingen does not have a train station. The Emsland Railway passes the municipality between stations Leer and Papenburg. The Ihrhove–Nieuweschans railway splits off from it towards Weener station. The Ihrhove railway station is to be reopened in 2026.

A touristic bicycle trail, following the Ems, goes through Westoverledingen.

Westoverledingen's economy is dominated by agriculture. Many of its inhabitants, however, have a job in nearby towns like Leer or Papenburg.

== Villages ==
Westoverledingen is divided into 12 Ortsteile for administrative purposes. The larger ones have their own elected local councils (Ortsrat) while the smaller ones have a local representative (Ortsvorsteher) appointed by the municipal council.

Village	Population 31 December 2020	Local government
Breinermoor	325	Ortsvorsteher
Driever	108	Ortsvorsteher
Esklum	187	Ortsvorsteher
Flachsmeer	4737	Ortsrat
Folmhusen	584	Ortsrat
Grotegaste	116	Ortsvorsteher
Großwolde	1670	Ortsrat
Ihren	1968	Ortsrat
Ihrhove	3626	Ortsrat
Mitling-Mark	168	Ortsvorsteher
Steenfelde	2254	Ortsrat
Völlen	5771	Ortsrat
