= Lebasee =

Lebasee may refer to:-

- Łebsko Lake (Lebasee in German)
- MV Lebasee, a cargo ship launched in 1996
