= Ihrhove–Nieuweschans railway =

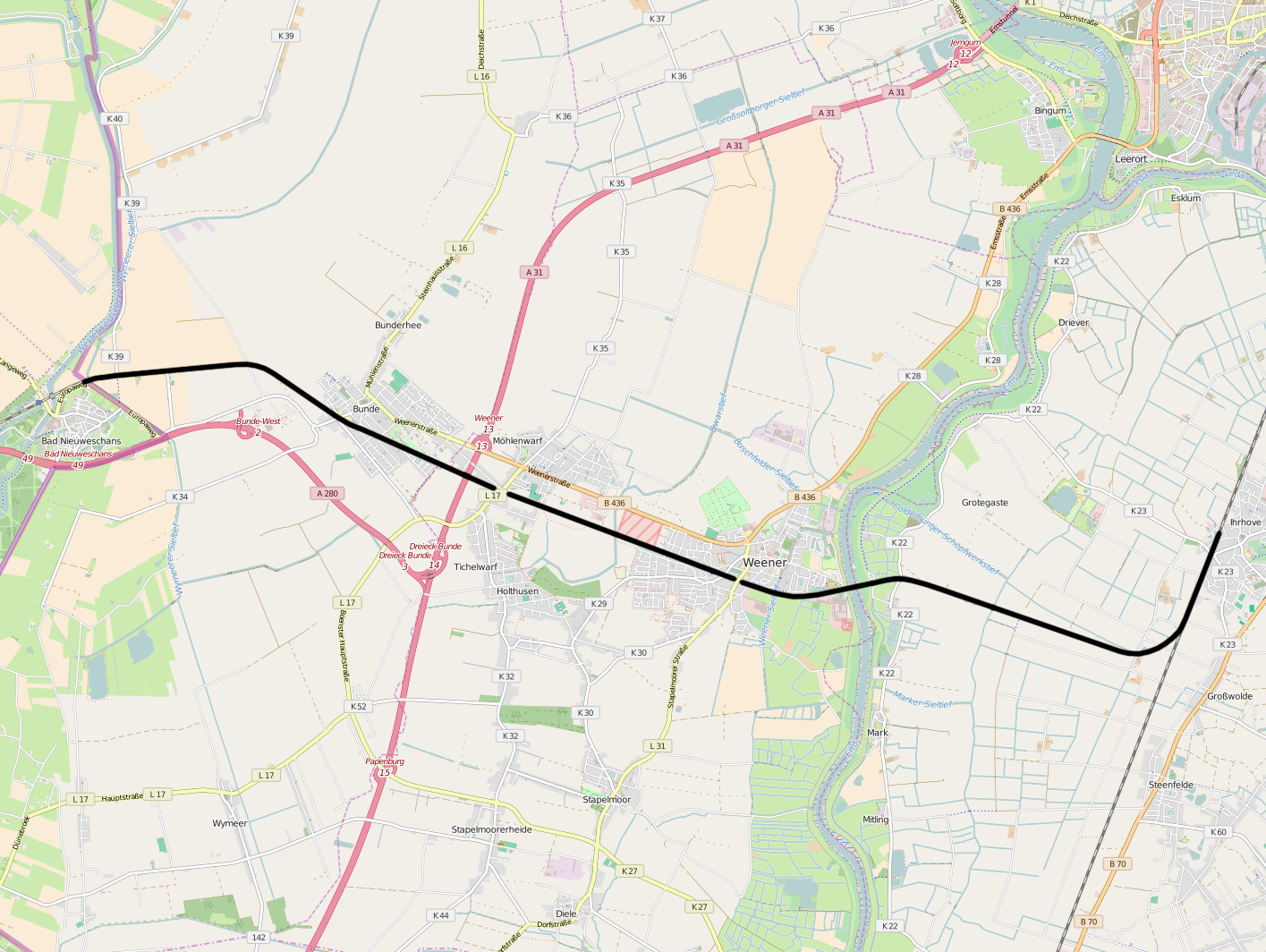
- Map of the Ihrhove-Nieuweschans railway

Overview
- Status: Operational
- Owner: Deutsche Bahn AG
- Locale: The Netherlands, Germany
- Termini: Ihrhove; Bad Nieuweschans

Service
- Operator: Arriva

History
- Opened: 1876

Technical
- Line length: 18 km (11 mi)
- Number of tracks: single track (rail)
- Track gauge: 1,435 mm (4 ft 8 1/2 in) standard gauge
- Electrification: no

The Ihrhove–Nieuweschans railway is an international railway line running from Ihrhove near Leer in Germany to Bad Nieuweschans in the Netherlands. The line was opened in 1876. Ihrhove is situated on the north-south Emsland Railway, between Papenburg and Leer. At Bad Nieuweschans, a connection with the Dutch railway network is provided through the Harlingen–Nieuweschans railway, which passes through Groningen. On 3 December 2015, the bridge over the Ems was destroyed by a ship colliding with it. The line between Ihrhove, Weener and Bad Nieuweschans was closed until 5 October 2026. A bus replacement service operated between Bad Nieuweschans and Leer following the accident. The line between Bad Nieuweschans and Weener reopened on 5 July 2016, with a bus replacement service in operation between Weener and Leer.

== Stations ==
There are two stations on the Ihrhove–Nieuweschans railway: Bad Nieuweschans and Weener.

== Accidents and incidents ==
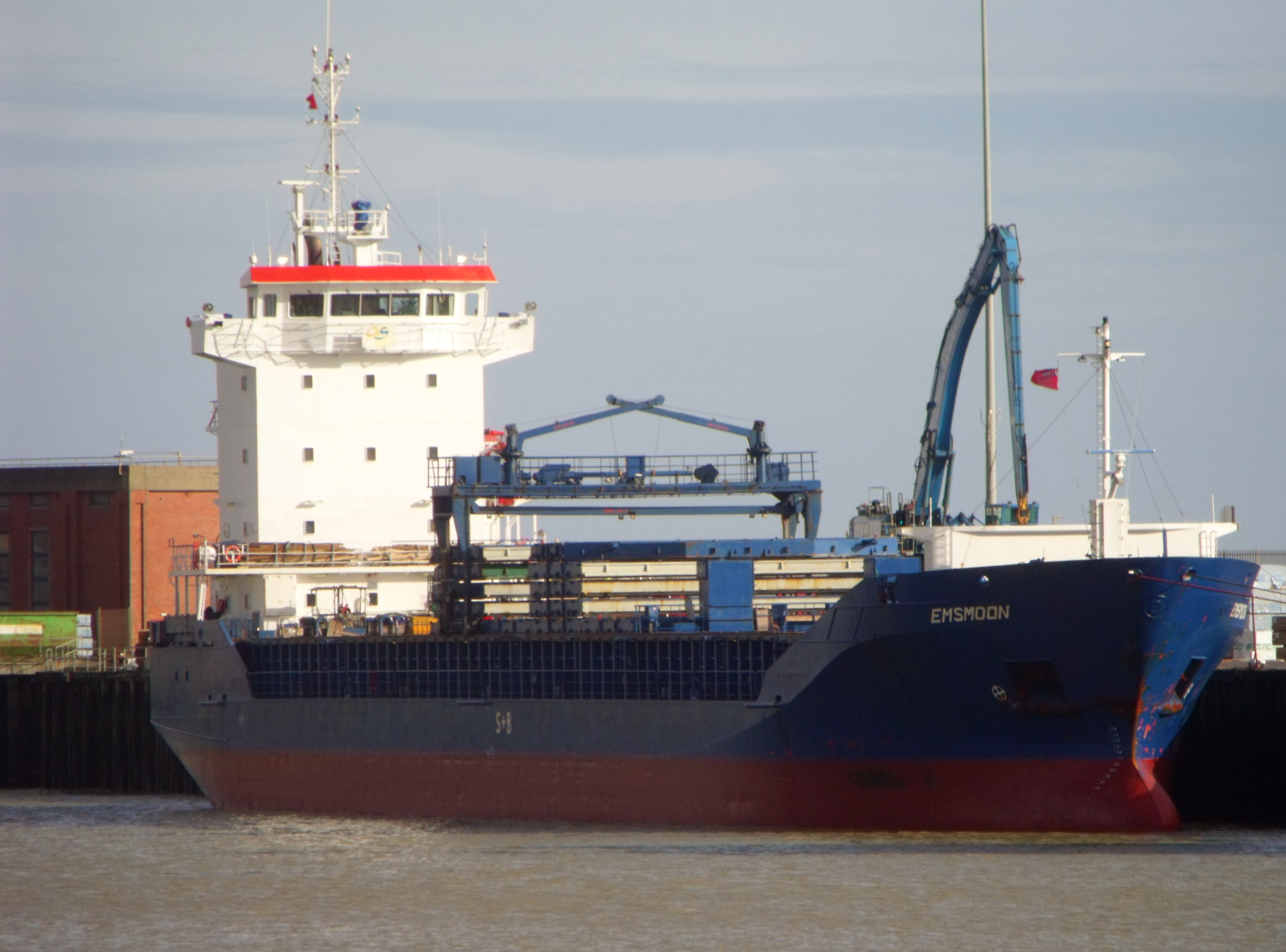
The Emsmoon, which destroyed the Friesenbrücke.

On 3 December 2015, the coaster Emsmoon collided with the Friesenbrücke, a bridge carrying the railway over the Ems near Weener, blocking both railway and river. Replacement of the bridge was then expected to take five years.

In July 2018, a plan for a new 160 meter swing bridge was announced, and opened in 2026 with a two year delay.
