= Weener railway station =

Railway station in Weener, Germany

Weener
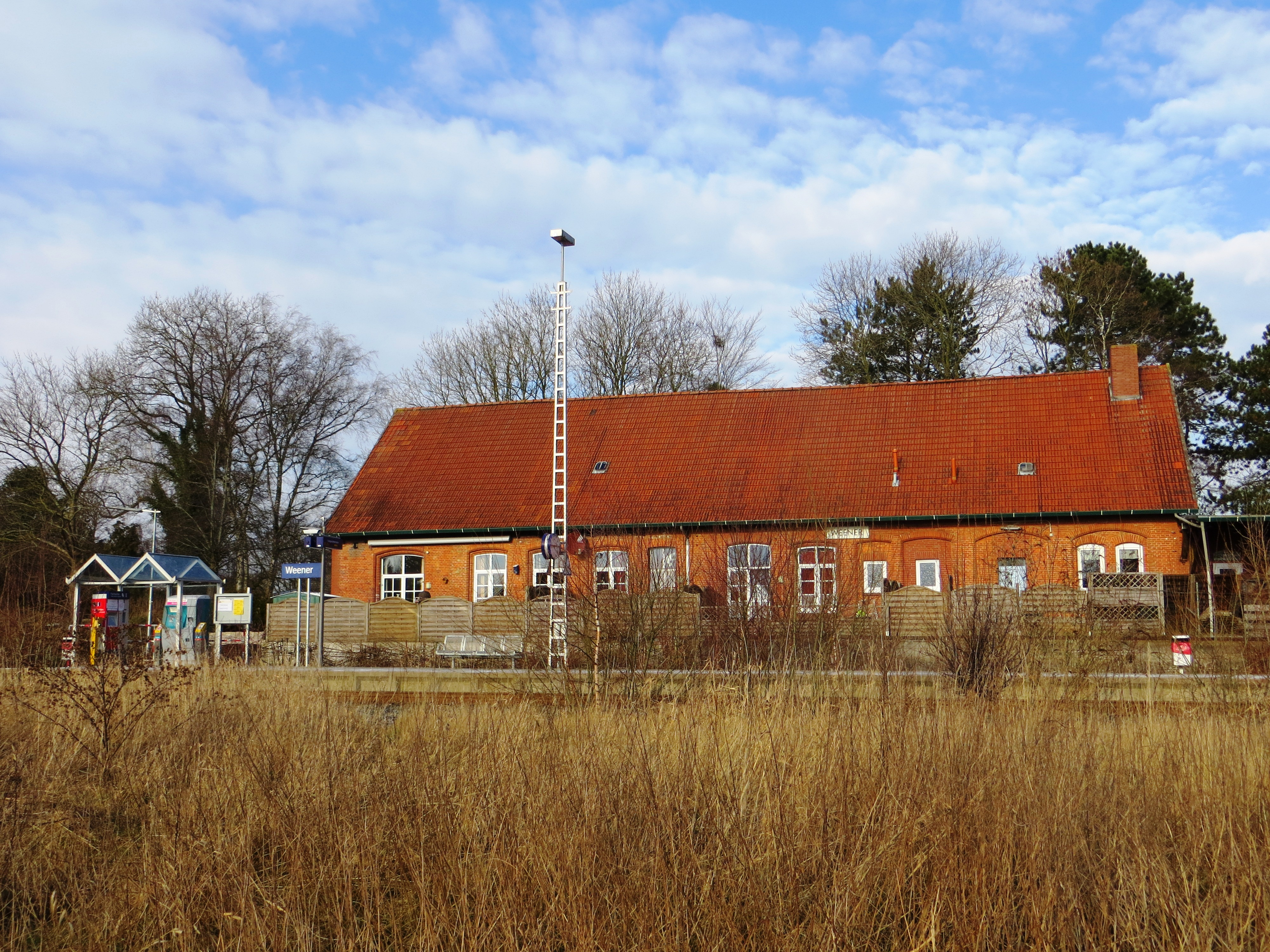
- Weener station in 2013

General information
- Location: Weener, Lower Saxony; Germany
- Coordinates: 53.1634°N 7.3429°E
- Line: Ihrhove–Nieuweschans railway
- Platforms: 1
- Tracks: 1

Other information
- Station code: 6576

Services
Preceding station	Arriva Netherlands	Following station
Bad Nieuweschans towards Groningen	Stoptrein 20100 RB57	Leer Terminus
Location

Weener (German pronunciation: [ˈveːnɐ]) is a railway station in the village of Weener in Germany. It is located on the Ihrhove–Nieuweschans railway between Leer and Bad Nieuweschans (Netherlands). Due to the destruction of a bridge near Weener, a bus service is provided by Arriva.

== Train services ==
The normal service at the station is:

- 1x per hour local services (stoptrein): Groningen – Bad Nieuweschans – Leer

Due to the closure of the railway, a rail replacement bus service is provided.

== History ==
On 3 December 2015, the coaster Emsmoon collided with the Friesenbrücke, a bridge carrying the railway over the Ems near Weener, blocking both railway and river. The completion of the bridge was planned for 2025.

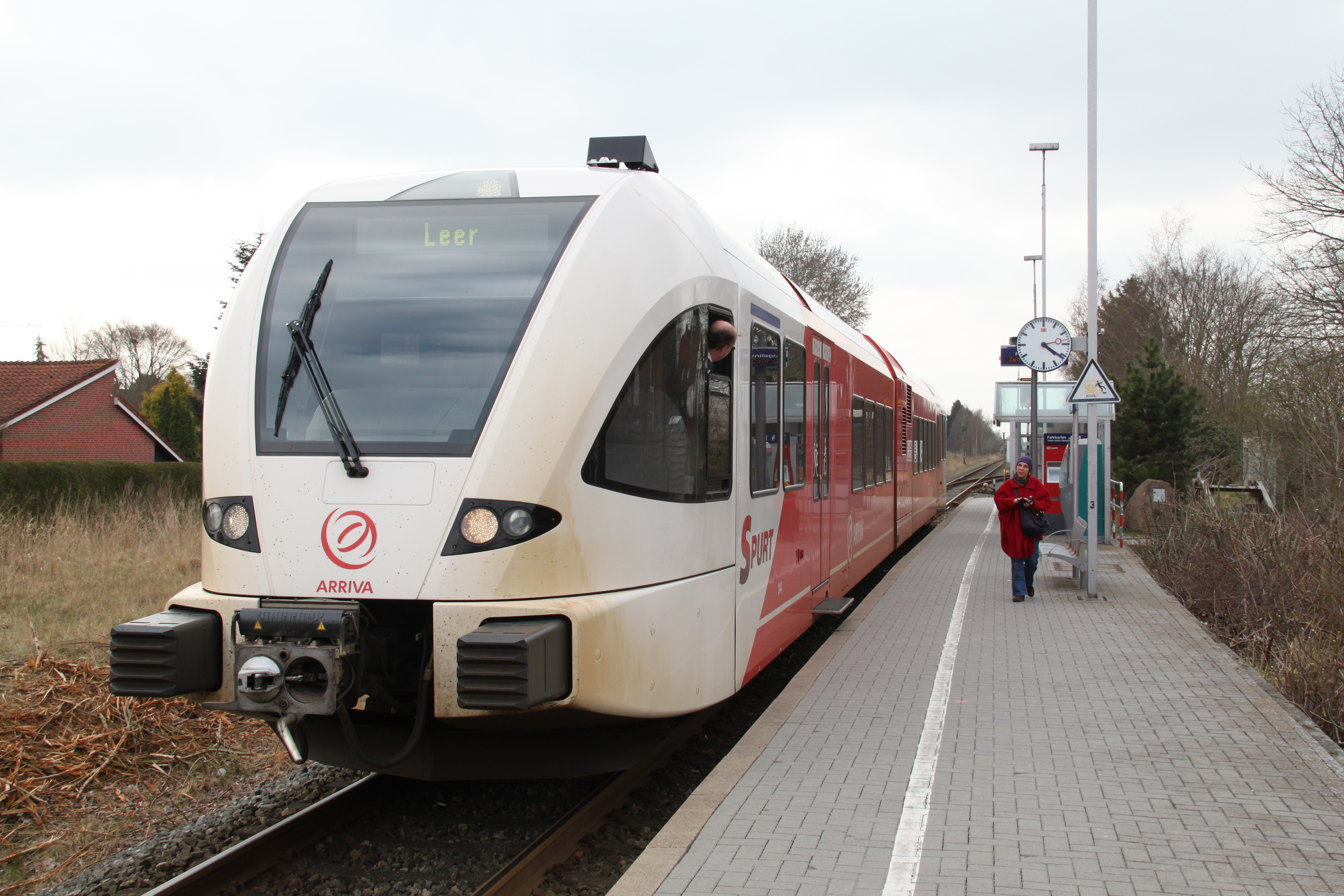
Arriva Spurt in 2013

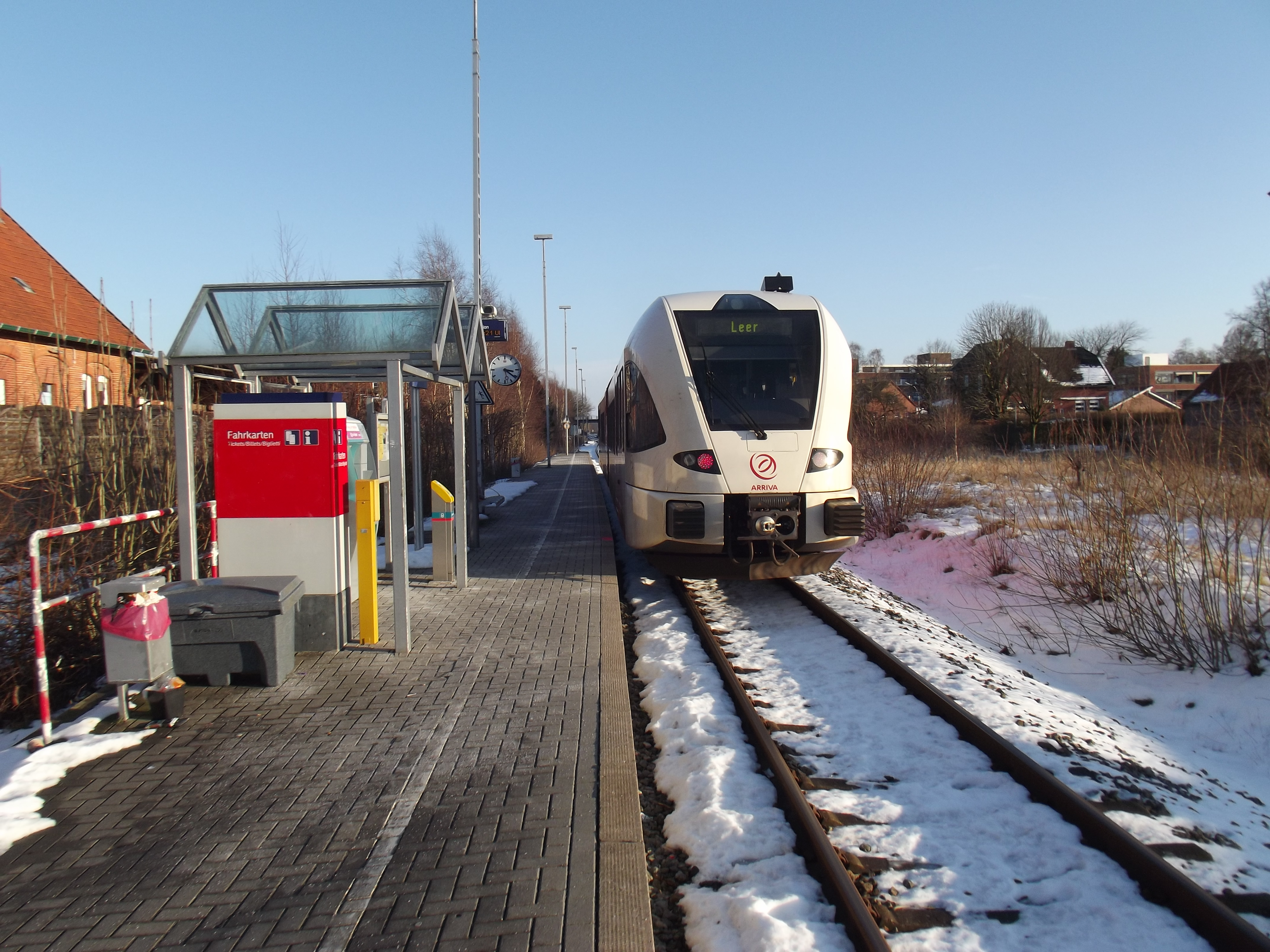
Arriva Spurt in 2014

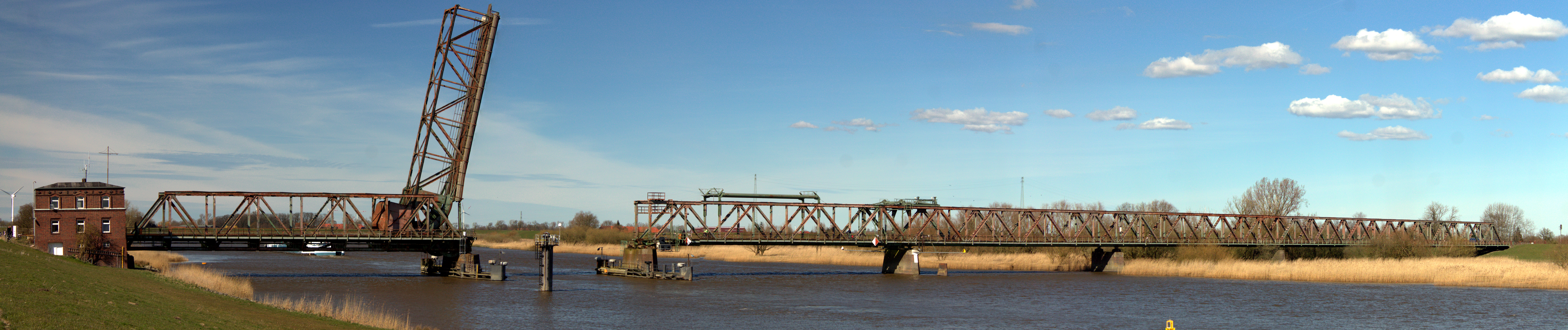
Friesenbrücke

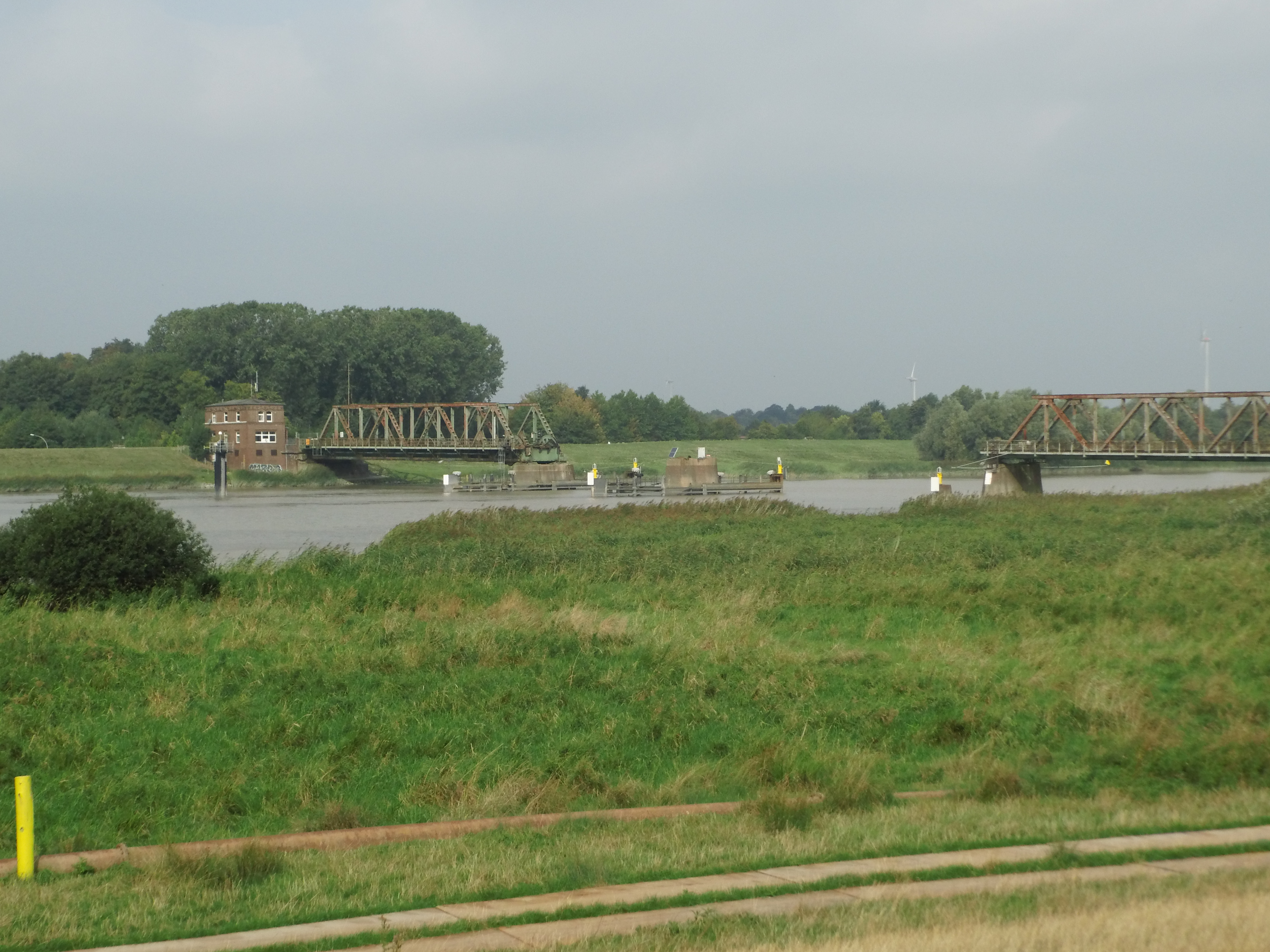
damaged Friesenbrücke
