= MV RMS Mulheim =

German owned container ship wrecked at Land's End, Cornwall

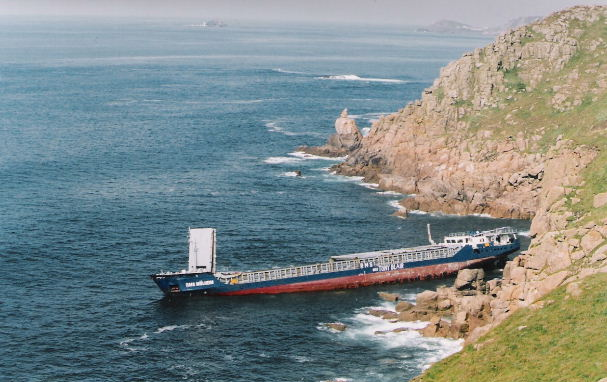
- RMS Mülheim, September 2003

History
- Name: Zeus (1999); RMS Mülheim (1999–2003)
- Namesake: Mülheim
- Owner: Kg CDL Leasing GmbH & Co
- Operator: Rhein-Maas-und See Schiffahrtskontor (RMS)
- Port of registry: Antigua and Barbuda
- Ordered: December 1997
- Builder: Tulcea Shipyard
- Yard number: 246
- Laid down: February 1998
- Launched: May 1999
- Identification: IMO number: 9177870; Callsign V2AD1
- Fate: Ran aground 22 March 2003; 50.073406°N 5.708452°W

General characteristics
- Type: Container, general & bulk carrier
- Tonnage: 1,599 GT; 780 NT; 2,500 DWT
- Length: 89.74 m (294 ft 5 in) overall; 84.94 m (278 ft 8 in) between perpendiculars
- Beam: 11.67 m (38 ft 3 in)
- Draught: 4.45 m (14 ft 7 in)
- Depth: 5.80 m (19 ft 0 in)
- Propulsion: Deutz SBV8M-628 diesel engine
- Speed: 13 knots (24 km/h; 15 mph)
- Capacity: 130 TEU; 12,850 m^{3} (16,810 cu yd) cargo space
- Complement: 6

MV RMS Mulheim was a German cargo ship that was built in Romania and launched in May 1999. It was wrecked on 22 March 2003 at Land's End, Cornwall.

== Description ==
The ship was built by Tulcea shipyard, Romania as yard number 246. She was ordered in December 1997, and the keel was laid in March 1998, before being launched in May 1999. The ship was 1,599 GT, 780 NT and 2,500 DWT.

The ship was 89.74 metres (294 ft 5 in) long overall (84.94 metres (278 ft 8 in) between perpendiculars) with a beam of 11.67 metres (38 ft 3 in), a depth of 5.80 metres (19 ft 0 in), and a draught of 4.45 metres (14 ft 7 in). She had a hold capacity of 12,850 cubic metres (16,810 cu yd) and had a container capacity of 130 TEU.

The ship was powered by a 2,039 brake horsepower (1,520 kW) Deutz SBV8M 628 diesel engine, which could propel her at 13 knots (24 km/h).

== History ==
The ship was originally named Zeus. She was placed under the flag of Antigua and Barbuda. She was owned by Kg CDL Leasing GmbH & Co Duisburg, Germany. By July 1999, she had been renamed RMS Mülheim and placed under the management of Rhein-Maas-und See Schiffahrtskontor (RMS). The IMO Number 9177870 was allocated and RMS Mülheim used the call sign V2AD1.

=== Loss ===
On 22 March 2003, RMS Mülheim was on a voyage from Cork, Ireland to Lübeck, Germany, transporting 2,200 tonnes of scrap car plastic. The ship ran aground at approximately 0500 GMT in Gamper Bay, between Land's End and Sennen Cove, during which time there was "moderate visibility and fog patches". On investigation, it was discovered that the chief officer—who had been on watch at the time—had caught his trousers in the lever of his chair when trying to get up, causing him to fall and rendering him unconscious. By the time he regained consciousness, RMS Mülheim was already bearing down on the shoreline. Although the Sennen Lifeboat and Land's End Coastguard Cliff Team were able to reach the wreck quickly, the six-man Polish crew of the vessel were airlifted to safety by a search and rescue helicopter from RNAS Culdrose. The members of the crew were treated for shock at the Sennen Cove Lifeboat Station.

There was diesel oil leaking into the ocean. The concerned agencies were informed, and a salvage operation was attempted. On 23 May 2003 RMS Mülheim was declared a constructive total loss. The salvage work was provided by the leading company Wijsmuiler Salvage. To remove as much cargo as possible, a conveyor belt system was used. When the weather and tide permitted, workers on the wreck filled jumbo-sized bags with the ship's cargo. Those bags were then brought up the cliff by the conveyor, which had been placed on the cliff just above the wreck. The operation ended on 29 May 2003. Although most of the cargo was removed, some was lost to the ocean. On 7 October 2003, in heavy seas, the ship broke into two pieces. On 31 October 2003, the swells pushed the wreck of the RMS Mülheim into a rocky inlet called Castle Zawn. At that time the wreck was demolished down to its superstructure.

=== Legacy ===
A year after the wreck, Surfers Against Sewage (SAS) reported that plastic and foam from the wreckage was still washing up on Cornish beaches. By 2018, the wreck had been broken up by the strong swell around Land's End although some relatively intact sections of the wreck remain.

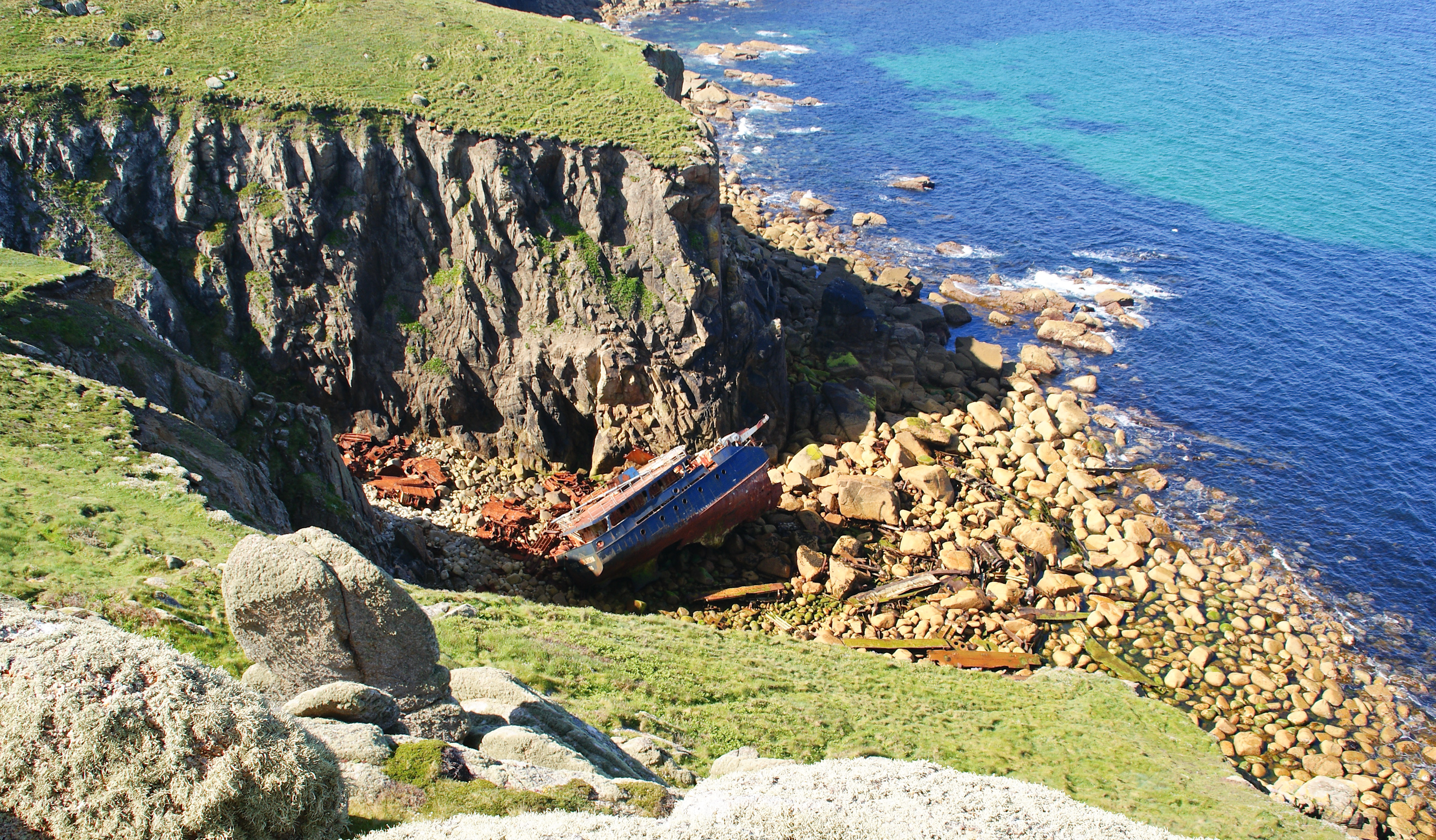
Remains of the ship in 2010.

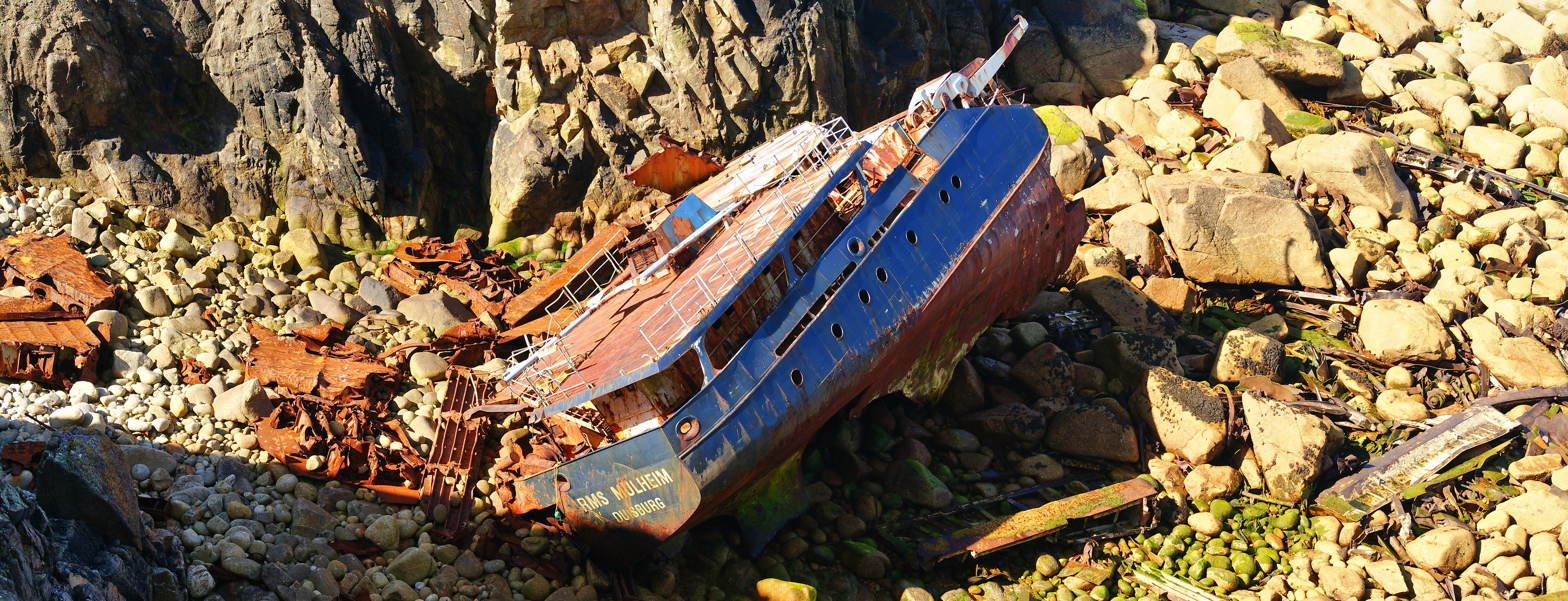
Close up of remains of the ship in 2010.

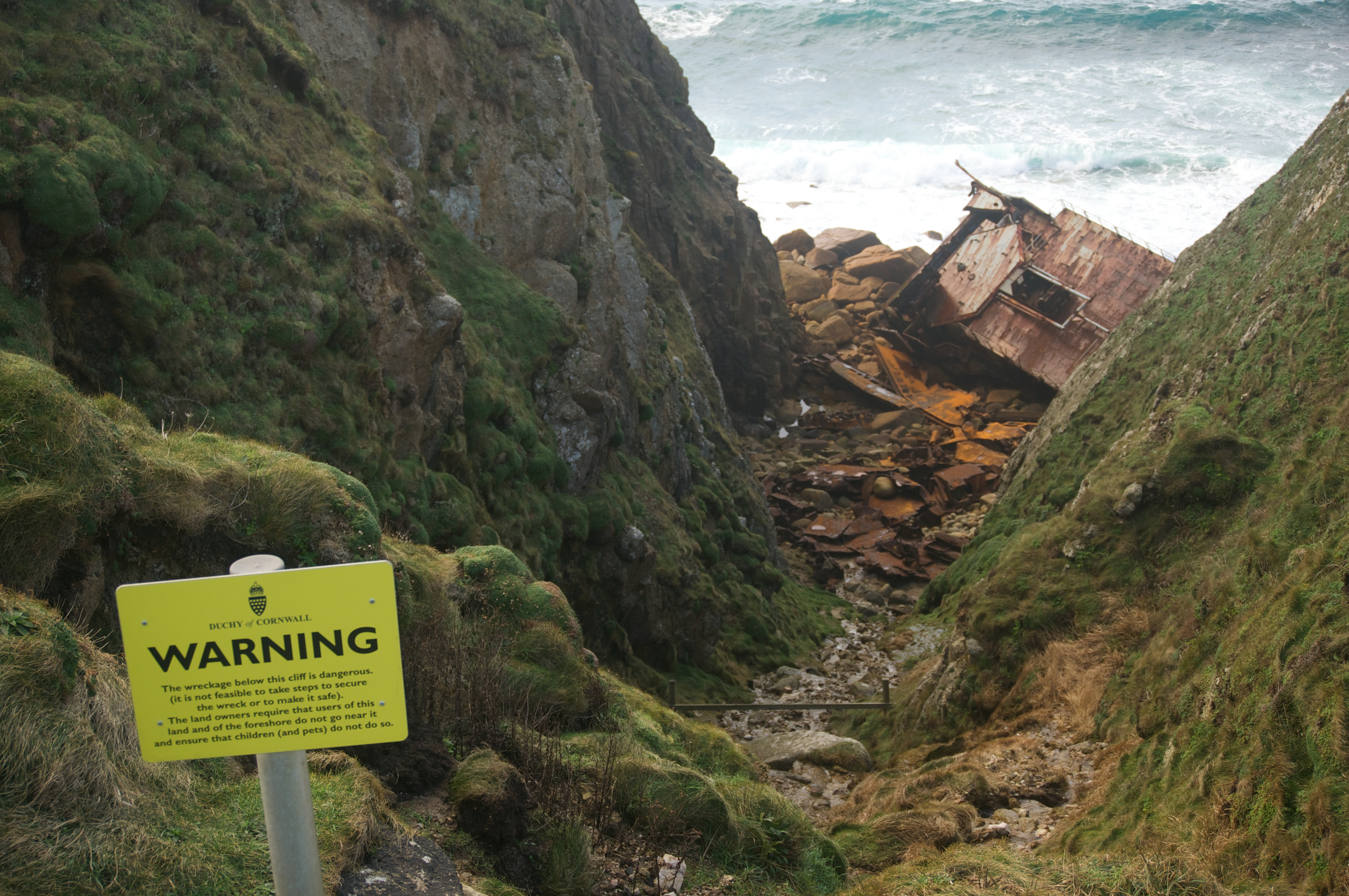
By 2013 nothing much remains of the ship except rusting stern bulkheads and sections of decking.

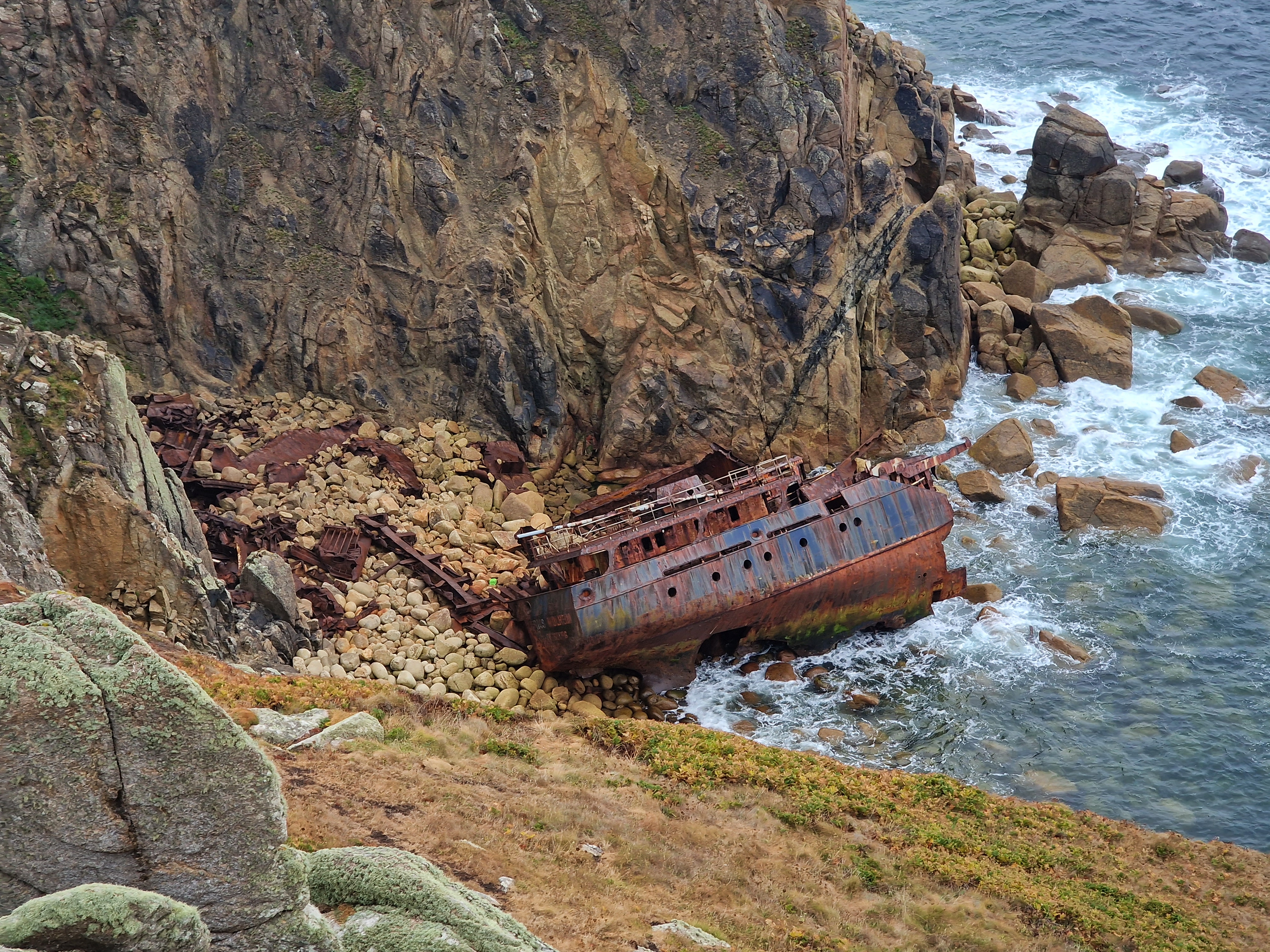
The wreck in 2022

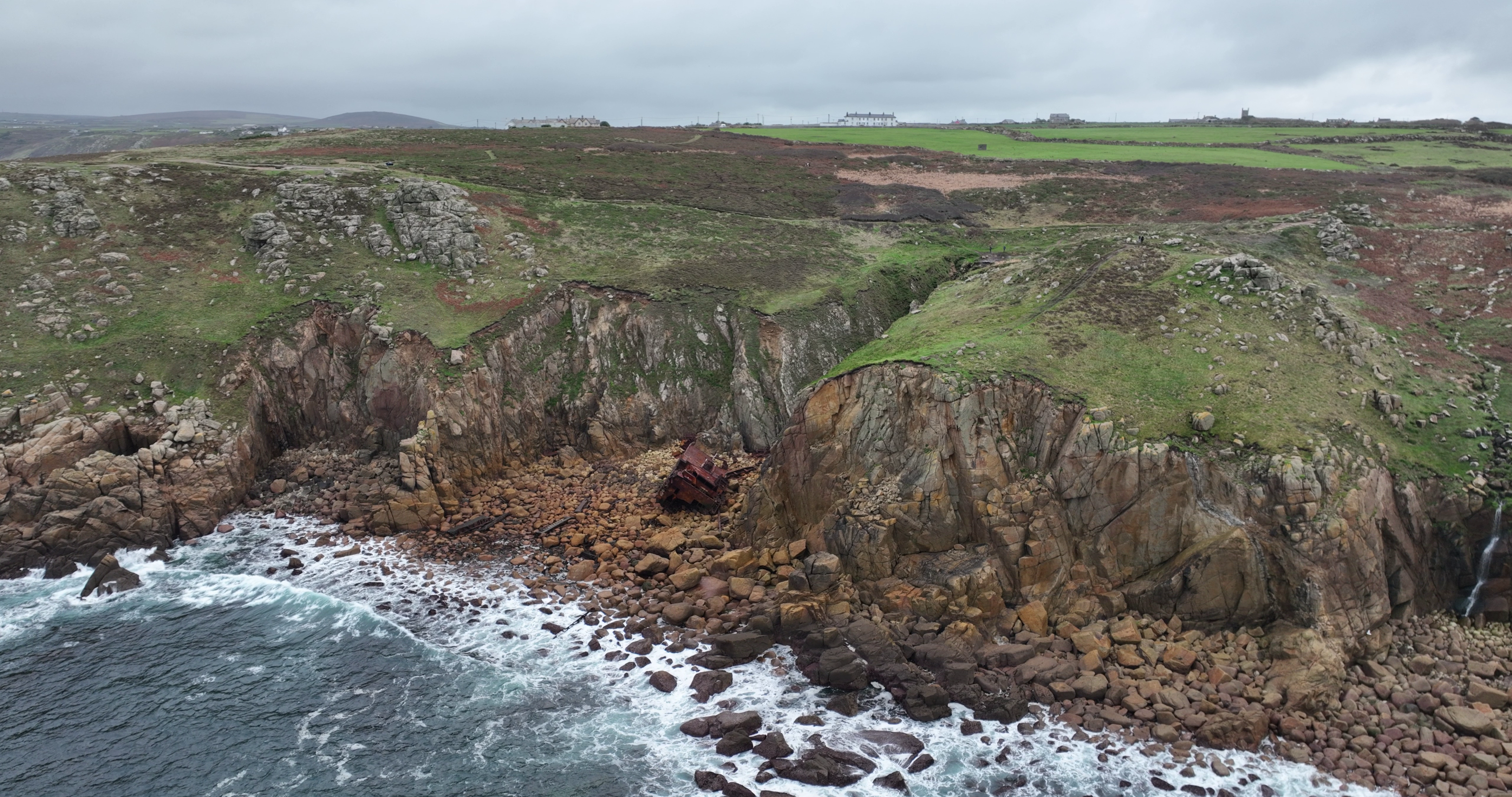
Aerial view of the wreck in 2024
