= MV Emsmoon =

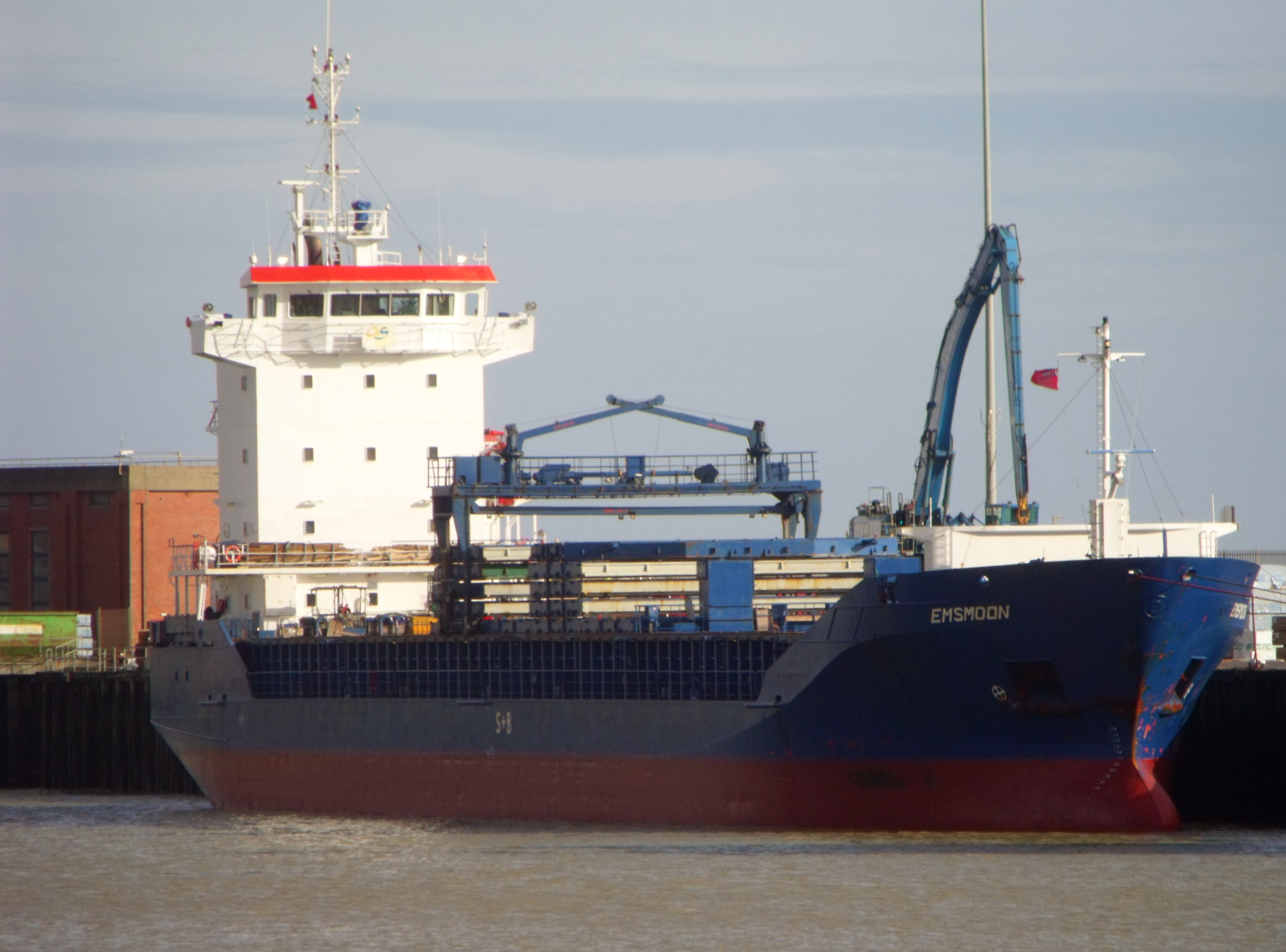
- Emsmoon at Shoreham in 2014

History
- Name: Morgenstond III (2000–05); Emsmoon (2005-2019); Helas (2019-2024); Stolya (since 2024)
- Owner: C.V. Scheepvaartonderneming Morgenstond III (2000–05); MS Emsmoon NTH Schiffahrts GmbH & Co.KG (since 2005)
- Operator: Wagenborg Shipping B.V. (2000–05); Marlow Ship Management (2005– ); Grona Shipping GmbH & Co.KG (as of December 2015); Hermann Lohmann Bereederungen Gmbh (as of 2023)
- Port of registry: Siddeburen, Netherlands (2000–05); St. John's, Antigua and Barbuda (since 2005); Limassol, Cyprus (as of 2023); Barbados (as of 2026)
- Builder: Ferus Smit
- Yard number: 326
- Laid down: 29 June 1998
- Launched: 18 November 2000
- Completed: 14 December 2000
- Identification: IMO number: 9213894; MMSI number: 304877000; Callsign: PBAX (2000–05), V2BN3 (since 2005)

General characteristics
- Tonnage: 4,563 GT; 2,613 NT; 6,359 DWT
- Length: 111.75 metres (366 ft 8 in) overall, 105.34 metres (345 ft 7 in) between perpendiculars
- Beam: 14.95 metres (49 ft 1 in)
- Draught: 6.37 metres (20 ft 11 in)
- Depth: 8.40 metres (27 ft 7 in)
- Installed power: Wärtsilä 8R32LNE diesel engine, 3,280 kilowatts (4,400 hp)
- Propulsion: Screw propeller
- Speed: 14.2 knots (26.3 km/h)

MV Emsmoon is a cargo ship that was built in 2000 as Morgenstond III. In December 2015, she collided with and demolished the bridge carrying the Ihrhove–Nieuweschans railway over the Ems.

== Description ==
The ship is 111.75 metres (366 ft 8 in) long overall (105.34 metres (345 ft 7 in) between perpendiculars), with a beam of 14.95 metres (49 ft 1 in). She has a depth of 8.40 metres (27 ft 7 in) and a draught of 6.37 metres (20 ft 11 in). She is powered by a Wärtsilä 8R32LNE diesel engine. The engine has eight cylinders of 320mm stroke by 350mm bore. Rated at 3,280 kilowatts (4,400 hp), it can propel her at 14.2 knots (26.3 km/h). She is assessed as 4,563 GT, 2,163 NT, 6,359 DWT, and has a container capacity of 356 TEU. She has the IMO number 9213894.

== History ==
Morgenstond III was built in 2000 as yard number 325 by Ferus Smit BV, Westerbroek, Groningen, Netherlands. Laid down on 29 June 1998, she was launched on 18 November 2000 and completed on 14 December 2000. She was built for C.V. Scheepvaartonderneming Morgenstond III, Siddeburen, Groningen and operated under the management Wagenborg Shipping, Delfzijl, Groningen. The callsign PBAX was allocated and her port of registry was Siddeburen.

Morgenstond III was sold in 2005 to Emsmoon NTH Schiffahrts, Papenburg-Ems, Germany and was renamed Emsmoon. She was placed under the management of Marlow Ship Management, Hamburg, Germany. This was later changed to Grona Shipping GmbH & Co.KG., Leer, Germany. Her port of registry is St. John's, Antigua and Barbuda. Her MMSI number is 304877000 and the callsign V2BN3 is allocated.

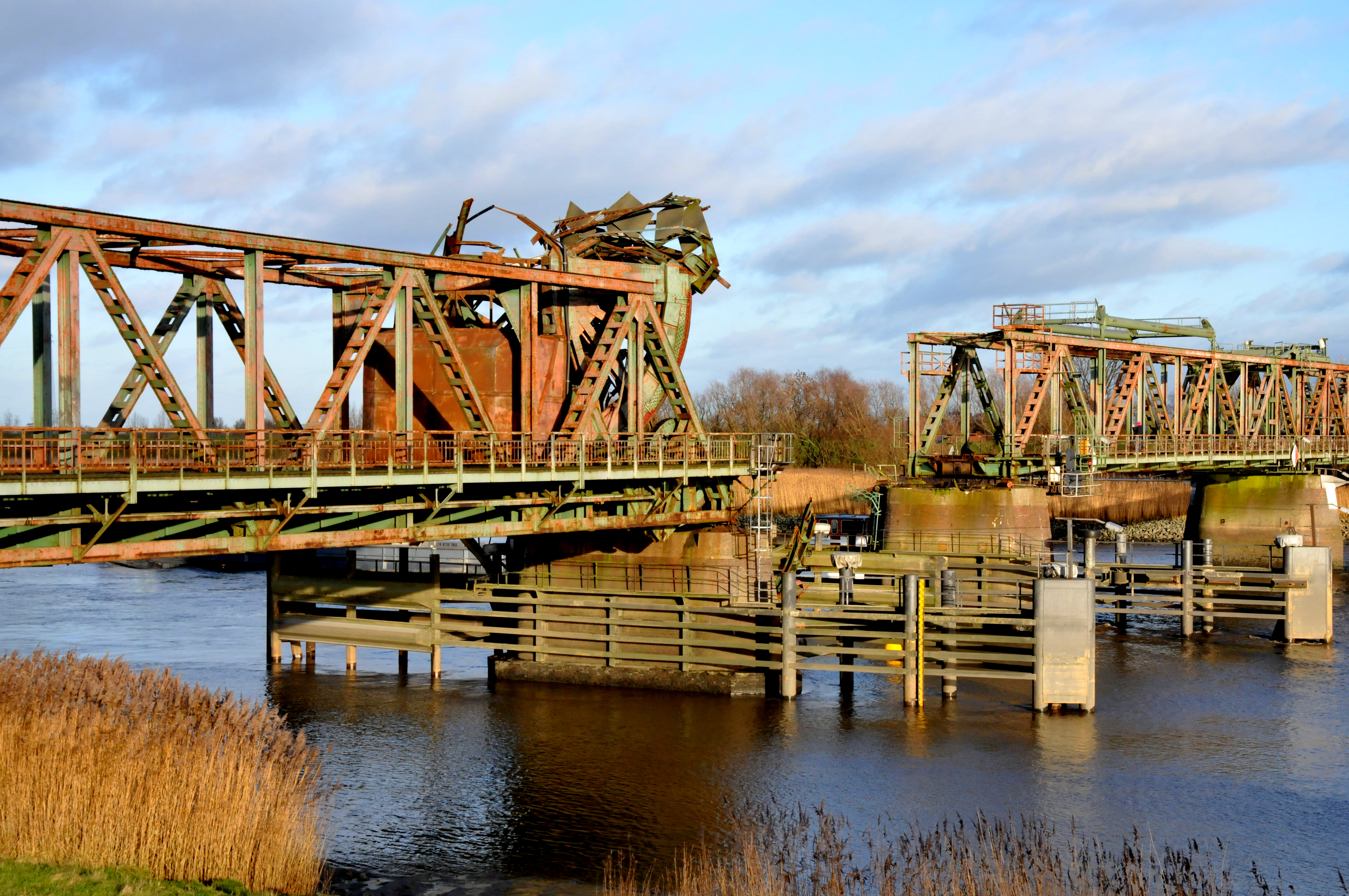
The remains of the Friesenbrücke, which Emsmoon destroyed on 3 December 2015.

On 3 December 2015, Emsmoon collided with the Friesenbrücke, which carries the Ihrhove–Nieuweschans railway over the Ems. The cause of the accident was reported to be miscommunication between the bridge operator and pilot on board the ship. The bridge could not be raised as a train was due, but the ship failed to stop and collided with the bridge, blocking both railway and river. The bridge was so severely damaged that it will have to be demolished. Replacement is expected to take at least nine years. Emsmoon was pulled from the wreckage of the bridge by the tug Gerd Bliede and taken to Papenburg. Afterwards, the bridge was demolished in 2021/22. Opening of the new bridge is planned for 2024.
