= MV Anne Scan =

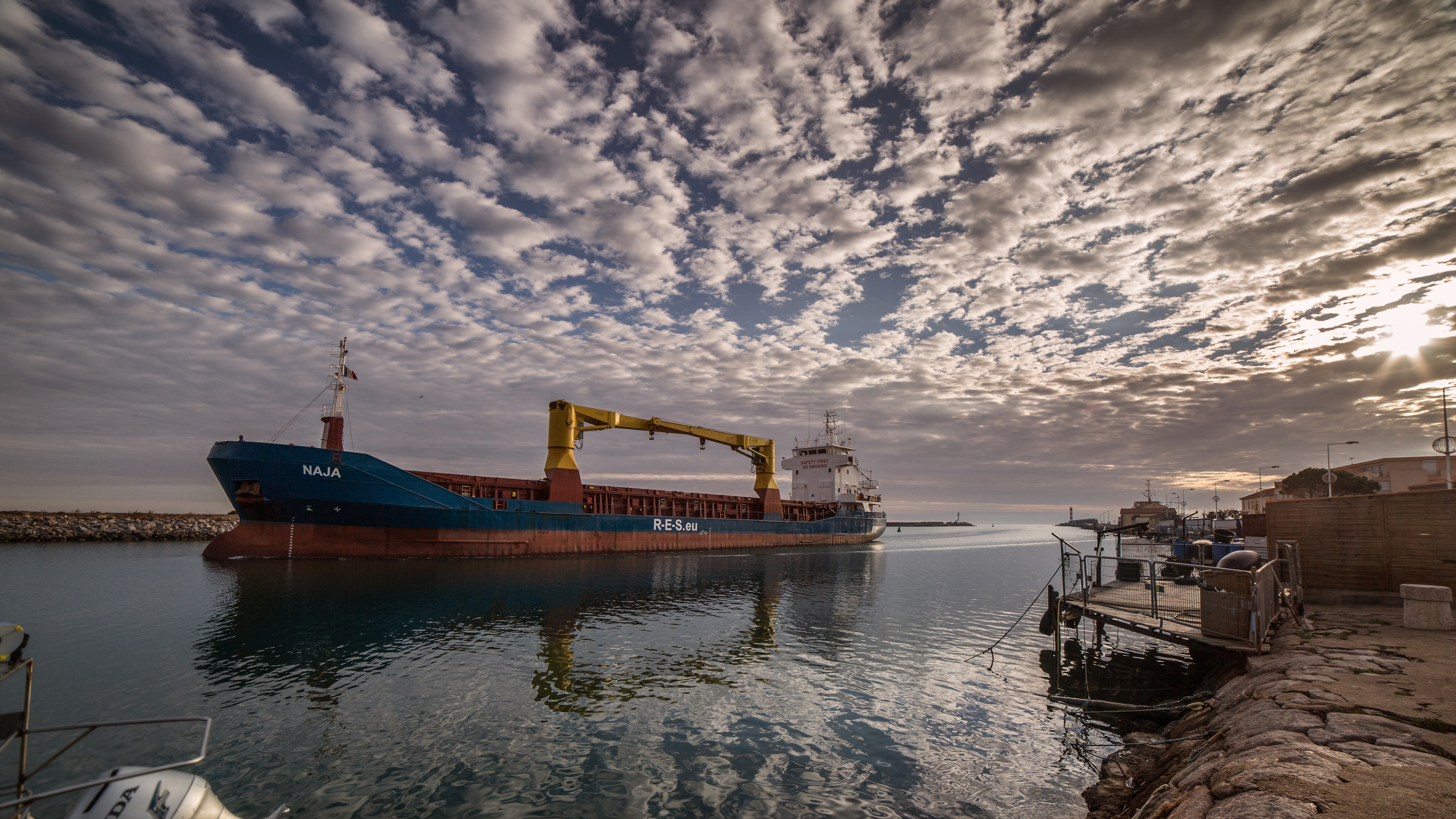

History
- Name: Lebasee (1997–2006); Moldavia (2006–07); Herford (2007); Anne Scan (since 2007)
- Owner: NORDICA Schiffahrts GmbH & Co. KG
- Operator: HELD Bereederungs GmbH & Co. KG
- Port of registry: (Antigua and Barbuda) St John's
- Builder: Slovenske Lodenice AG
- Launched: 10 December 1996
- Completed: 1 March 1997
- Identification: IMO number: 9145126; MMSI number: 304256000; Callsign: V2IA8

General characteristics
- Tonnage: 2,528 GT; 1,372 NT; 3,526 DWT
- Length: 88.6 m (290 ft 8 in)
- Beam: 12.8 m (42 ft 0 in)
- Draught: 7.1 m (23 ft 4 in)
- Installed power: 1 x MAN B&W diesel engine, 1,715 kilowatts (2,300 hp), 1 bow thruster 185 kilowatts (248 hp)
- Speed: 12 knots (22 km/h)

Anne Scan is a cargo ship registered in Antigua and Barbuda which was detained in Greenore, Republic of Ireland on 27 October 2009 when over €50,000,000 worth of cigarettes were discovered on board.

== History ==
Anne Scan was built by Slovenskie Lodenice AG. She was launched in 1996 and completed on 1 March 1997. Her original name was Lebasee. In 2006 she was renamed Moldova and in 2007 she was renamed Herford and then Anne Scan. She is owned by NORDICA Schiffahrts GmbH & Co. KG, Haren, Germany and managed by HELD Bereederungs GmbH & Co. KG, Haren. The vessel is operated by Scan-Trans. Her port of registry is St. John, Antigua and Barbuda.

On 27 October 2009, Anne Scan was seized by Irish authorities for allegedly being involved in a cigarette smuggling operation. An estimated €50 million was found on board the ship when it was seized in Greenore, County Louth by Revenue Customs Service supported by An Garda Síochána, making it the largest seizure of contraband cigarettes in the European Union. The ship was moved to Dublin Port for unloading. It was chartered to take cargo from the Philippines and was to be returned to her owners after the trip.

== Description ==
Anne Scan has a blue hull and white superstructure. She is 88.6 metres (290 ft 8 in) long with a beam of 12.8 metres (42 ft 0 in) and a draught of 7.1 metres (23 ft 4 in). She is 2,528 GT, 1,372 NT and 3,526 DWT. She is powered by a MAN B&W diesel engine of 1,715 kilowatts (2,300 hp) and has a 185 kilowatts (248 hp) bow thruster to aid manoeuvrability. Anne Scan has a speed of 12 knots (22 km/h).

== Identification ==
Anne Scan has IMO Number 9145126, MMSI Number 304256000 and uses the callsign V2IA8.
