= Friesenbrücke =

Railway bridge in Germany

Coordinates: 53.1614°N 7.3724°E

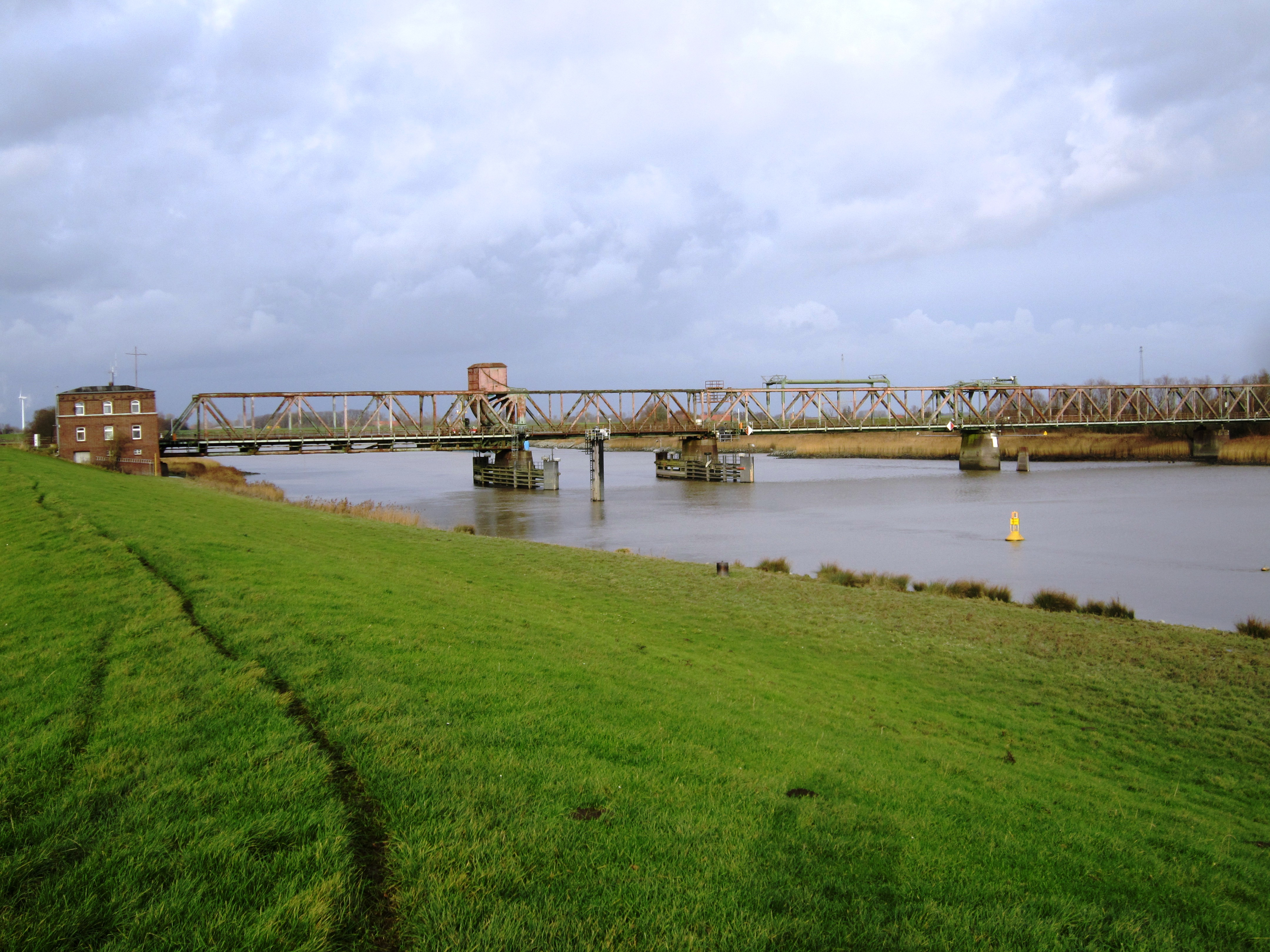

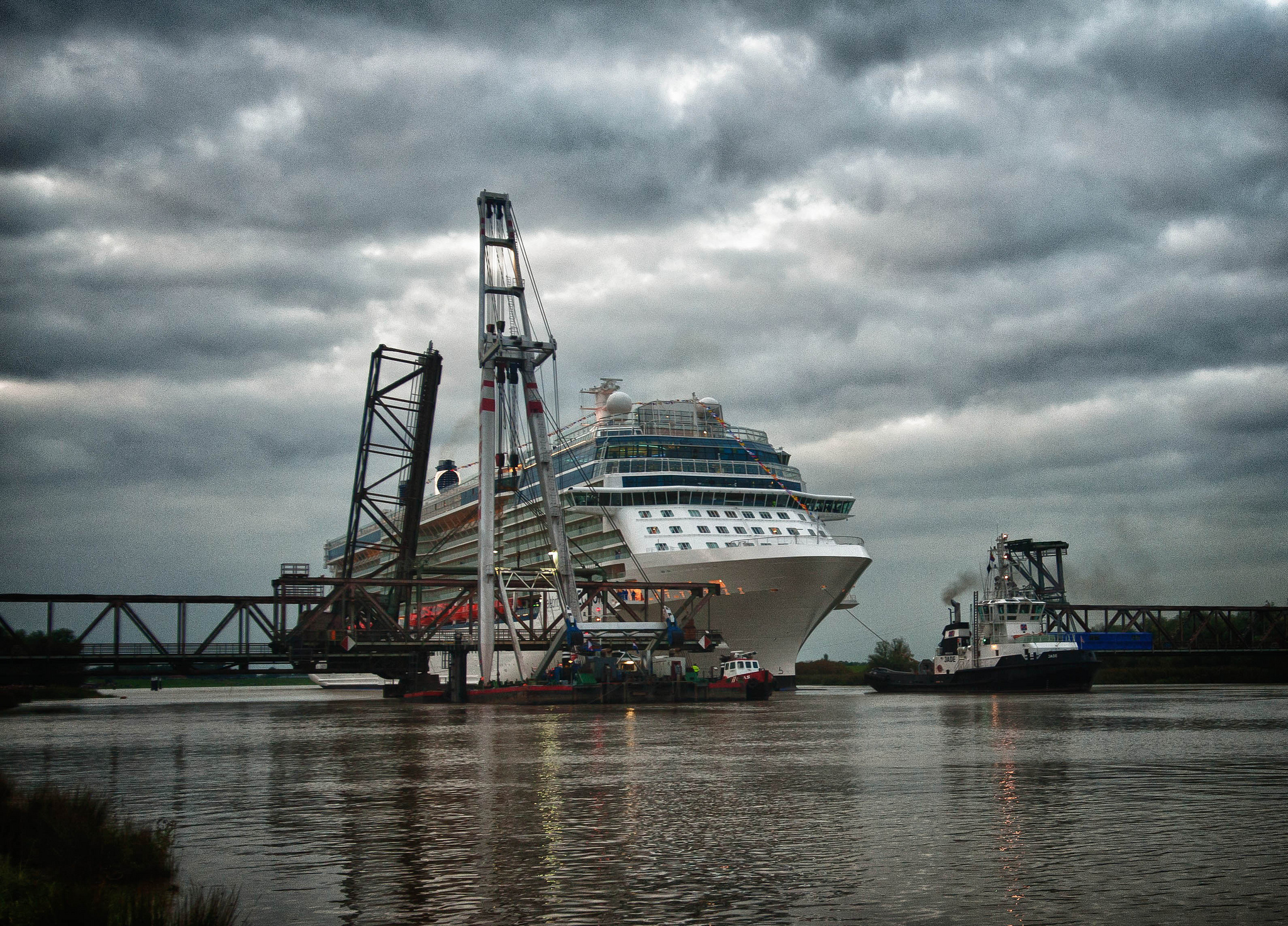
Celebrity Reflection passing the bridge in 2012

The Friesenbrücke is a railway bridge in Weener, Germany, crossing the river Ems.

== Background ==
The first bridge was built under the name Emsbrücke Hilkenborg between 1874 and 1876. In June 1922 the lighter Hohenfelde, towed by the Theseus, collided with the bridge, making the construction of a new bridge necessary.

Between 1924 and 1926 the new bridge, a bascule bridge and the first Friesenbrücke, was built with a length of about 335 meters. During World War 2 it was blown up by German soldiers (Wehrmacht) to stop the Canadian soldiers at the Ems.

After World War 2, a new Friesenbrücke was built between 1951 and 1952, also a bascule bridge. The bridge wasn't wide enough to allow all newbuilts of the Meyer Werft in Papenburg to pass the bridge since the 1980s, so a second was created, which was opened by a crane vessel multiple times a year.

In December 2015 the bridge was damaged by the cargo ship Emsmoon. Since then, the bridge has been closed for railway. In the following days, the scrap was removed by a floating crane. Passing the bridge wasn't possible for ocean-going ships for about one week. The bridge was demolished in 2021/22.

A new Friesenbrücke is planned to be completed in 2024 as a swing bridge. Construction officially started in July 2021. The bridge will have a length of 337 meters. The swing element will have a length of 145 meters, the width of the ship opening will be around 57 meters. The bridge keeper's house won't be demolished, and will get an additional floor. Construction of the superstructure in Weener started in July 2024.

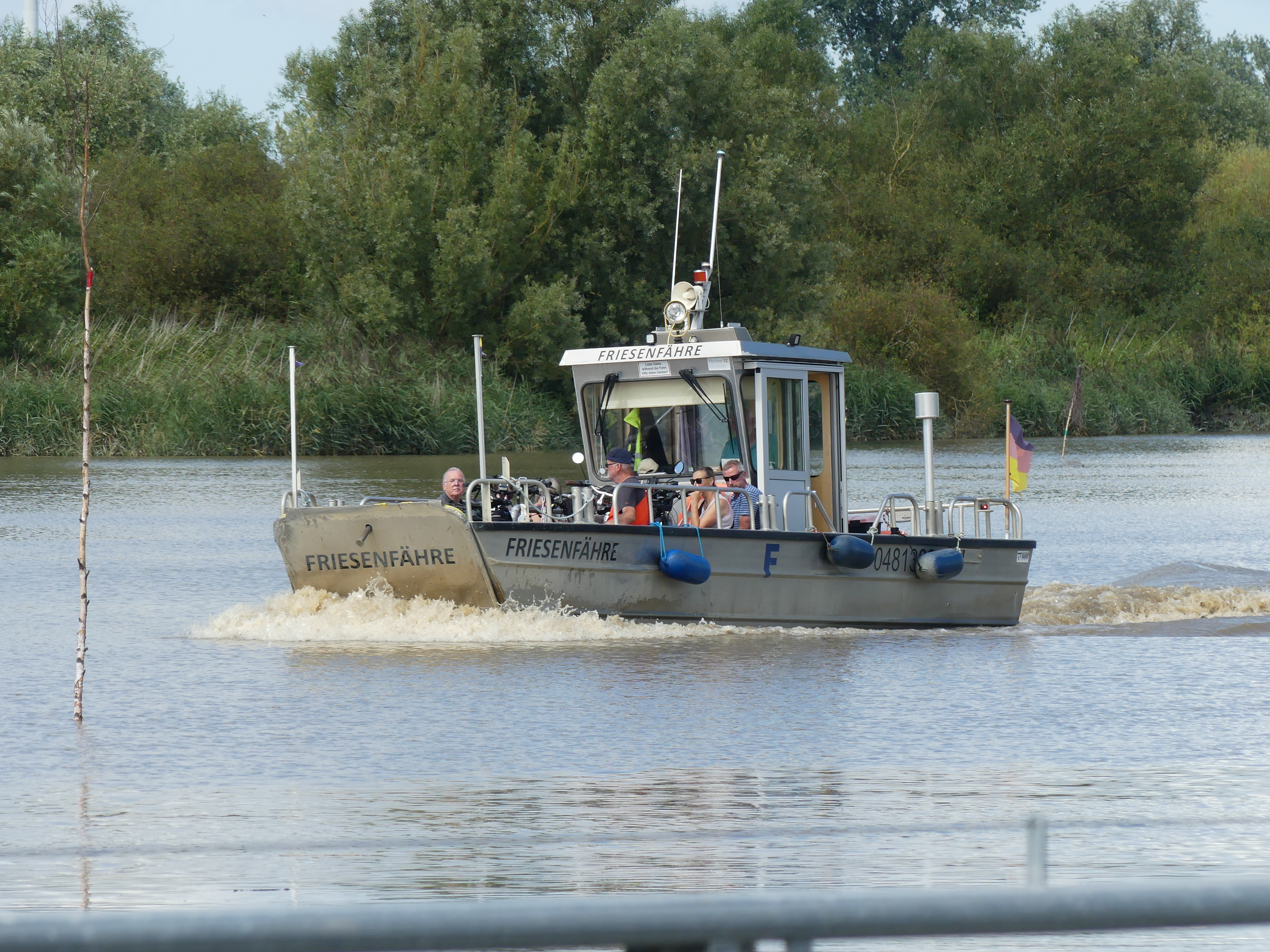
Friesenfähre

Until the completion, there is ferry service between Weener and Westoverledingen.

In May 2024, a delay for around a half year was announced.

In September 2025, the bridge was opened to pedestrians and cyclists. Train operator Arriva started running trains over the bridge for testing in August 2026; passenger trains are expected to start again by October 2026.
