= 703 (disambiguation) =

703 is the year AD 703.

703 may also refer to:

== Science and technology ==
- 703 Noëmi, an S-type asteroid discovered in 1911
- G.703, an ITU-T standard for transmitting voice or data over digital networks
- NGC 703, a lenticular galaxy in the constellation Andromeda
- Kosmos 703, a Soviet satellite launched in 1965
- Minuscule 703, a Greek minuscule manuscript of the New Testament
- NSS-703, a communications satellite operated by New Skies

== Arts, entertainment, and media ==
- Accident 703, a 1962 Spanish drama film
- Quartettsatz, D 703 (Schubert), a string quartet piece composed by Franz Schubert in 1820
- Suite 703, a defunct adult media line produced by Naughty America

== Transportation and infrastructure ==
- Aoimori 703 series, an electric multiple unit train type in Japan
- Area code 703, telephone area codes for Northern Virginia
- E (underground car), an experimental New York City subway car model numbered 703
- Farm to Market Road 703, a former Texas road designation now part of Texas State Highway 115
- March 703, a Formula 3 racing car built in 1970
- National Highway 703 (India), a highway in northern India
- National Route 703 (Costa Rica), a secondary highway in Alajuela, Costa Rica
- Nevada State Route 703, a former state designation now part of Nevada State Route 525
- PZInż 703, a family of Polish trucks designed in the late 1930s
- South Carolina Highway 703, a state highway in the United States

== Military ==
- 703 Naval Air Squadron, a unit of the British Royal Navy's Fleet Air Arm
- 703d Helicopter Squadron, a United States Air Force training unit
- 703rd Strategic Missile Wing, an inactive United States Air Force wing
- 703rd Support Brigade (Ukraine), an engineering and logistical unit of the Ukrainian Ground Forces
- German submarine U-703, a Type VIIC U-boat during World War II
- USS Boston (SSN-703), a Los Angeles-class nuclear submarine
- USS Caprice (SP-703), a United States Navy patrol vessel in service from 1917 to 1919

== Transportation incidents ==
- Ansett New Zealand Flight 703, a 1995 aircraft crash near the Tararua Ranges
- Itavia Flight 703, a 1960 aircraft crash on Mount Vesuvius
- Lao Aviation Flight 703, a 2000 aircraft crash in northeast Laos
- LOT Polish Airlines Flight 703, a 1988 emergency crash-landing near Rzeszów
- Saratov Airlines Flight 703, a 2018 aircraft crash shortly after takeoff from Moscow

== Other uses ==
- 703 (number)
- 703 BC

== See also ==
- Flight 703
