= Emily Stone =

Emily Stone may refer to:

- Em Stone or Emily Stone (born 1978), illustrator
- Emma Stone (born 1988 as Emily Jean Stone), actress
- Emily Stone (mathematician)
- Emily Stone (writer), author of romance fiction
