= EM =

EM, Em or em may refer to:

== Arts and entertainment ==
=== Music ===
- Em, the E minor musical scale
- Em, the E minor chord
- Electronic music, music that employs electronic musical instruments and electronic music technology in its production
- Encyclopedia Metallum, an online metal music database
- Eminem, American rapper

=== Other uses in arts and entertainment ===
- Em (comic strip), a comic strip by Maria Smedstad

== Companies and organizations ==
- Em (restaurant), a restaurant in Mexico City
- Aero Benin (IATA code), a defunct airline
- Empire Airlines (IATA code), a charter and cargo airline based in Idaho, US
- Erasmus Mundus, an international student-exchange program
- Estado de Minas, a Brazilian newspaper
- European Movement, an international lobbying association
- ExxonMobil, a large oil company formed from the merger of Exxon and Mobil in 1999
- La République En Marche! (sometimes shortened to "En Marche!"), a major French political party

== Economics ==
- Emerging markets, nations undergoing rapid industrialization

== Language and typography ==
=== Language ===
- M, a letter of the modern Latin alphabet, in English and other languages
- Em (Cyrillic) (М / м), a letter of the Cyrillic alphabet
- Em (digraph), a digraph in Portuguese
- Em, the third-person singular oblique Spivak pronoun

=== Typography ===
- em (typography), a unit of measurement
- em dash, a dash that is one em wide
- em space or mutton, a space that is one em wide

== Management ==
- Emergency management, a discipline that studies dealing with and avoiding risks
- Energy management, planning and operation of energy production and energy consumption units
- Environmental management, the management of the interaction of human societies with the environment

== Places ==
- El Monte, California, a city in the United States
- El Monte, Chile, a city in Chile

== Science ==
=== Biology ===
- Extracellular matrix, the connective tissue supporting cells in multicellular organisms
- Membrane potential (E_{m}), of a cell

=== Computing ===
- <em>...</em>, emphasis HTML element
- End of medium, ISO C0 control code ^Y
- Empirical modelling
- em (typography), a unit of measurement in Web design
- eM Client E-Mail client
- A whole brain emulation, see also brain emulation, a hypothetical future life extension technology. Ems were coined by Robin Hanson.

=== Gardening and Agriculture ===
- Effective microorganisms, a series of commercial products advertised to improve soil and plant growth

=== Medicine ===
- Emergency medicine, a medical specialty dealing with acute illnesses and injuries that require immediate attention
- Erythema multiforme, a skin condition that usually follows an antecedent infection or drug exposure
- Erythromelalgia, a disorder that typically affects the skin of the feet and/or hands, causing redness, heat and pain
- Extensive metabolizer, a term used in pharmacogenomics to refer to individuals with normal metabolic activity

=== Physics ===
- Exametre or exameter (Em), an SI unit of length equal to 10^{18} metres
- Electromagnetic spectrum, the range of all possible frequencies of electromagnetic radiation
- Electromigration, the transport of conducting solid material caused by electric current through it
- Electromagnetism, one of the fundamental physical forces
- Electromechanics, combines electrical engineering and mechanical engineering

=== Other uses in science and technology ===
- Em (underground car)
- Nikon EM, an SLR camera made by the Nikon Corporation in the late 1970s
- Early Minoan, an archaeological period
- Electron microscope, a type of microscope that uses electrons to "illuminate" a specimen and create an enlarged image
- Electron multiplier, a vacuum-tube structure that multiplies incident charges by means of secondary emission
- Electronic monitoring, a form of surveillance used in criminal justice
- Atlantic Equatorial mode, a climate pattern of the Atlantic Ocean
- Expectation–maximization algorithm, an algorithm for finding maximum likelihood estimates of parameters in probabilistic models

== People ==
- Em Beihold (born 1999), American singer-songwriter
- Em Bryant (born 1938), American professional basketball player
- Em Cooper, British filmmaker and animator
- Em Lindbeck (1934–2008), American professional baseball player
- Em Rossi (born 1998), American singer-songwriter
- Em Rusciano, Australian entertainer
- Em Prasad Sharma (born 1975), Indian politician
- Em Stone (born 1978), American comic book illustrator

== Other uses ==
- Electrician's mate, an occupational rating in the U.S. Navy and U.S. Coast Guard
- David Em (born 1952), an American computer art pioneer
- EM gauge, a scale used in model railways
- EM TV, a television channel in Papua New Guinea
- Etymologicum Magnum, in the bibliography of the largest Byzantine lexicon
- Em (underground car), a Soviet rapid transit train car
