= Buffalo and Erie County Naval & Military Park =

Military and naval museum in Buffalo, New York, US

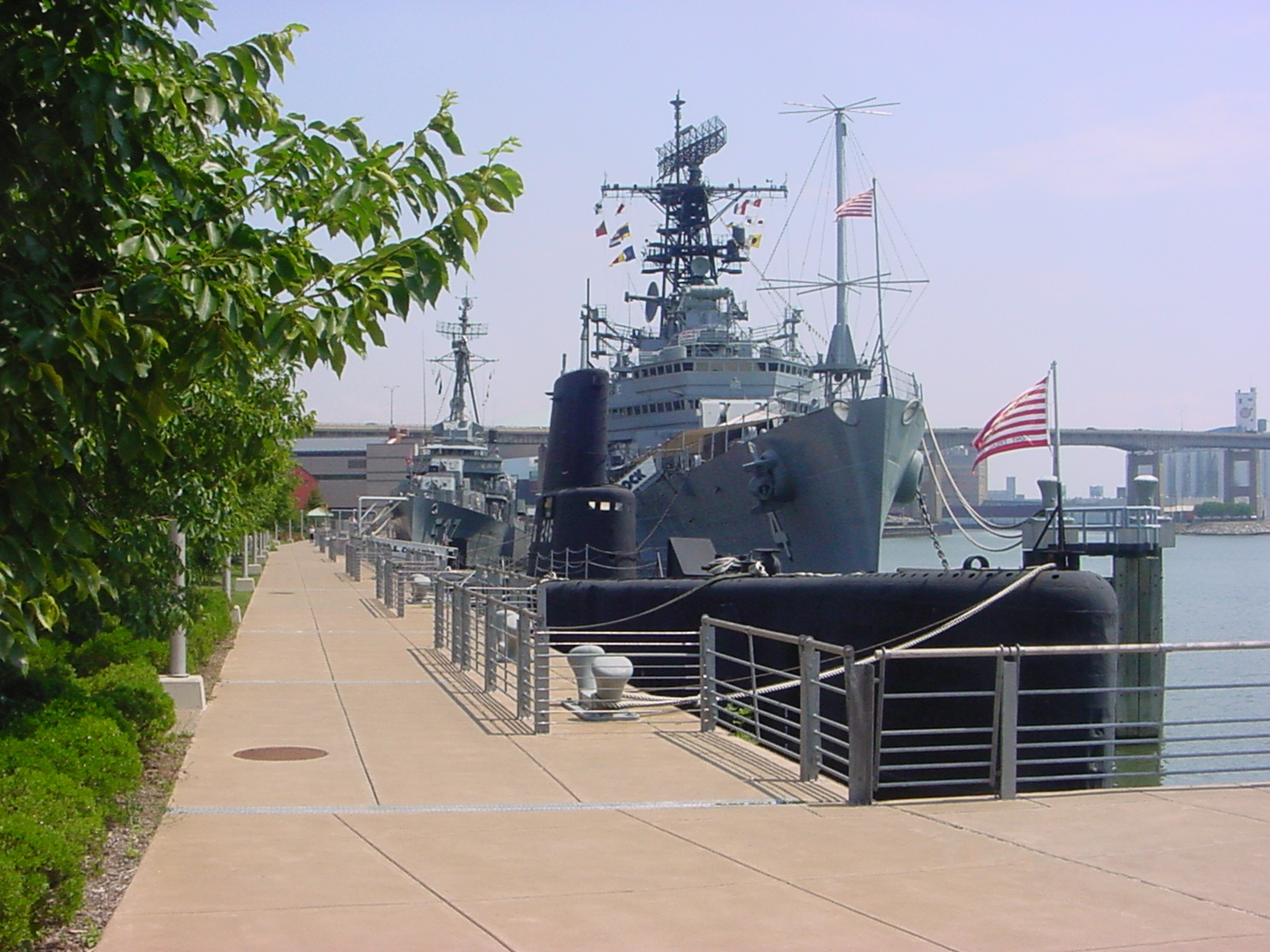
- Established: July 4, 1979
- Location: Canalside, Buffalo, New York
- Coordinates: 42.877639°N 78.880978°W
- Public transit access: NFTA Metro Rail (Canalside)
- Website: Official Website

The Buffalo and Erie County Naval & Military Park, formerly known as The Buffalo Naval and Servicemen's Park, is a museum on the bank of the Buffalo River in Buffalo, New York. It is home to several decommissioned US Naval vessels, including the Cleveland-class cruiser USS Little Rock, the Fletcher-class destroyer USS The Sullivans, and the submarine USS Croaker. All three are open to the public for tours.

== History ==
In 1976, the Buffalo Urban Renewal Agency and the Buffalo Naval and Servicemen's Park requested the United States Department of the Navy supply a decommissioned naval vessel to construct a naval park. The construction of the Buffalo Naval and Servicemen's Park (later named the Buffalo and Erie County Naval & Military Park) started in 1977. The park was opened to the public on July 4, 1979. The Cleveland-class cruiser USS Little Rock and the Fletcher-class destroyer USS The Sullivans were part of the original display. In 1988, the Gato-class submarine USS Croaker was added. In 1989, Croaker underwent a refit. The ships in the park remain property of the United States Navy, which inspects them annually.

The park has gone through a few major changes in recent years. In 2003, the ships were moved slightly to the foot of Pearl and Main streets. The park now abuts Buffalo's Canalside and the historic Commercial Slip within it. New structures were added including a new museum, and the new Liberty Hound restaurant opened in the summer of 2012.

On December 16, 2017, USS Little Rock (LCS-9) was commissioned at the park alongside its namesake USS Little Rock (CG-4). The commissioning was the first time a United States Naval vessel was commissioned alongside its namesake.

On September 24, 2022, the African American Veterans Monument, which honors the service of African Americans in all U.S. military conflicts, was dedicated at the park. It is the first monument of its kind in the United States.

== Displays ==
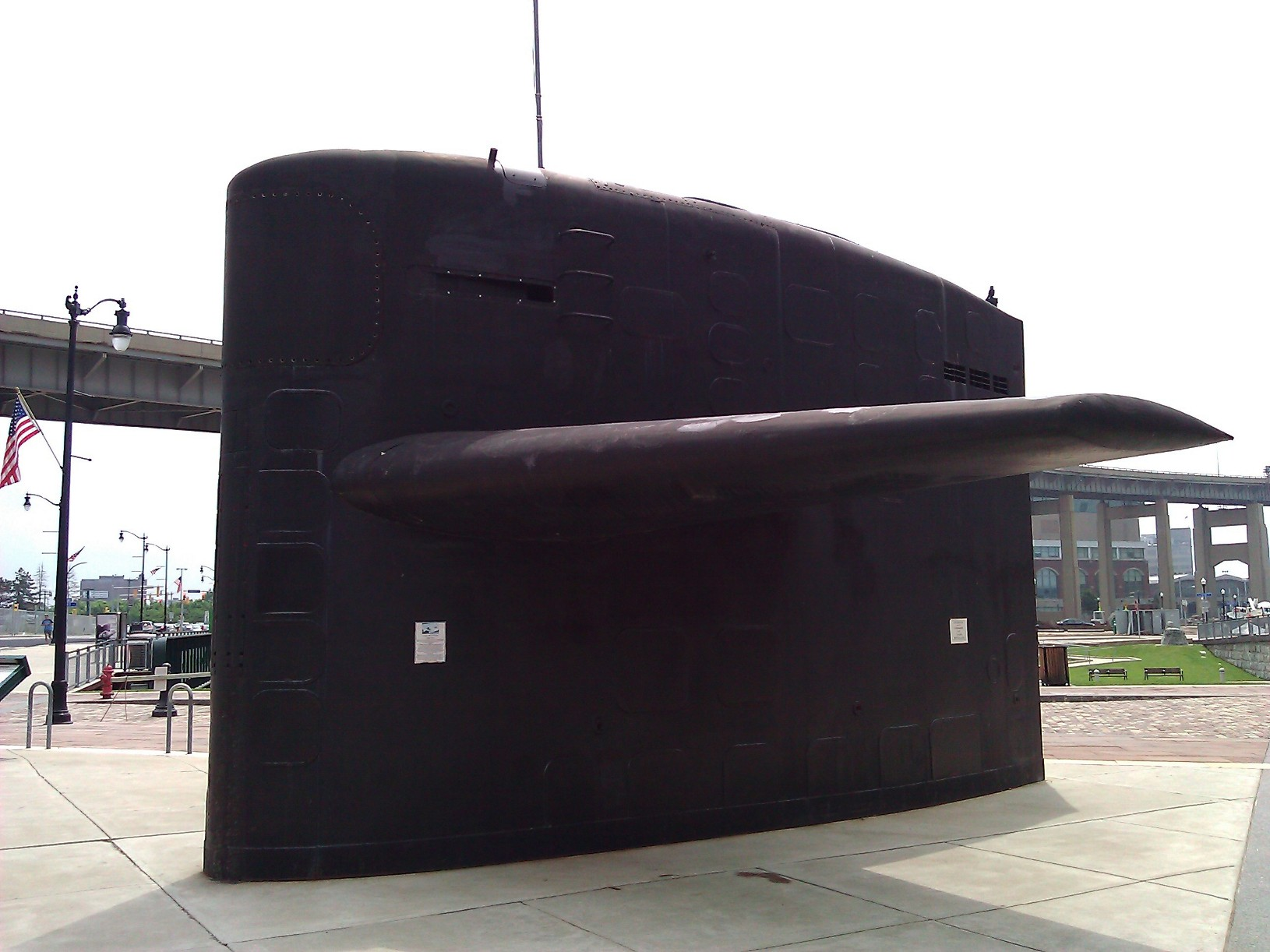
The sub sail of USS Boston on display

Along with the ships, there are a variety of smaller vehicles, vessels, and aircraft also on display at the park. These include the Gyrodyne X-Ron 1 Rotorcycle one-man helicopter used by the US Marine Corps in the late fifties and early sixties, an Army M41 Walker Bulldog tank, a Marine Corps M-84 armored personnel carrier, a UH-1 Huey flown in Vietnam, an Air Force F-101 Voodoo flown by the New York Air National Guard's 136th Fighter-Interceptor Squadron at Niagara Falls Air Reserve Station, a Nasty-class PTF boat, the PTF-17 used by the Navy in Vietnam, a Navy FJ Fury (FJ-4) jet (equivalent to the Air Force's F-86 Sabre), and a USAAF P-39 Airacobra manufactured at Bell Aircraft in Buffalo which saw service in World War II. The sail of the Los Angeles Class submarine USS Boston is also on display here.

The park is located in the Canalside District near the KeyBank Center and LECOM Harborcenter in downtown Buffalo. Hours vary by season, but the park is closed from December to March.
