= USS Little Rock (CL-92) =

Light cruiser of the United States Navy

Coordinates: 42°52′39.4″N 78°52′51.2″W

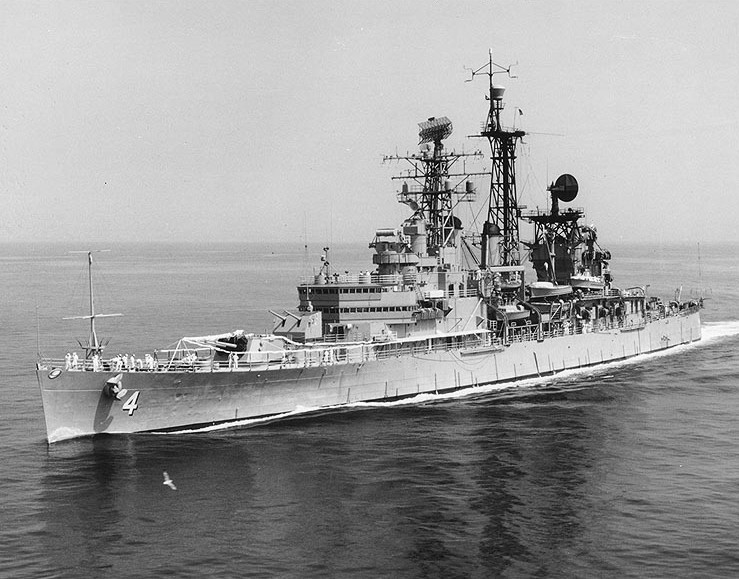
- USS Little Rock (CLG-4), off Naples, Italy, on 31 July 1967, while serving as flagship of the Sixth Fleet.

History

United States
- Name: Little Rock
- Namesake: City of Little Rock, Arkansas
- Builder: Cramp Shipbuilding Co., Philadelphia
- Yard number: 535
- Laid down: 6 March 1943
- Launched: 27 August 1944
- Sponsored by: Sam Wassell
- Commissioned: 17 June 1945
- Decommissioned: 24 June 1949
- Refit: 1957–1960
- Recommissioned: 3 June 1960
- Decommissioned: 22 November 1976
- Reclassified: CLG-4, 23 May 1957; CG-4, 1 July 1975
- Stricken: 22 November 1976
- Identification: Hull symbol:CL-92; Hull symbol:CLG-4; Hull symbol:CG-4; Code letters:NBVW; Call sign:Body Guard
- Motto: "Pride in Achievement"
- Status: Museum Ship at the Buffalo and Erie County Naval & Military Park
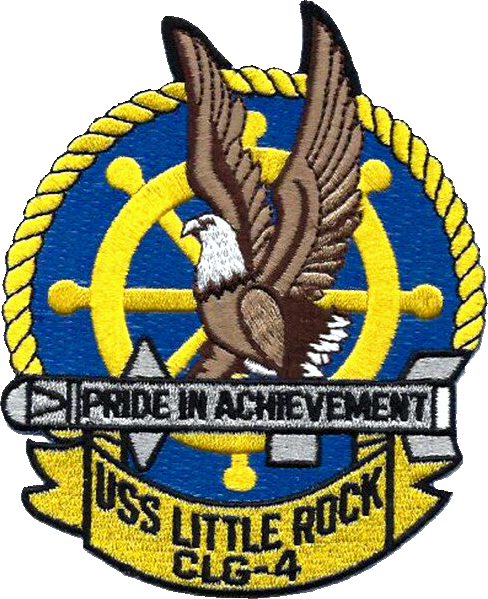
- Badge

General characteristics (as built)
- Class & type: Cleveland-class Light cruiser
- Displacement: 11,744 long tons (11,932 t) (standard); 14,131 long tons (14,358 t) (max)
- Length: 610 ft 1 in (185.95 m) oa; 608 ft (185 m)pp
- Beam: 66 ft 4 in (20.22 m)
- Draft: 25 ft 6 in (7.77 m) (mean); 25 ft (7.6 m) (max)
- Installed power: 4 × 634 psi Steam boilers; 100,000 shp (75,000 kW)
- Propulsion: 4 × geared turbines; 4 × screws
- Speed: 32.5 kn (37.4 mph; 60.2 km/h)
- Range: 11,000 nmi (20,000 km) @ 15 kn (17 mph; 28 km/h)
- Complement: 1,255 officers and enlisted
- Armament: 4 × triple 6 in (152 mm)/47 caliber Mark 16 guns; 6 × dual 5 in (127 mm)/38 caliber; 4 × quad 40 mm (1.6 in) Bofors; 6 × dual 40 mm (1.6 in) Bofors; 21 × single 20mm Oerlikon cannons
- Armor: Belt: 3 1/2–5 in (89–127 mm); Deck: 2 in (51 mm); Barbettes: 6 in (150 mm); Turrets: 1 1/2–6 in (38–152 mm); Conning tower: 2 1/4–5 in (57–127 mm)
- Aircraft carried: 4 × floatplanes
- Aviation facilities: 2 × stern catapults

General characteristics (1960 rebuild)
- Class & type: Galveston-class guided missile cruiser
- Complement: 1,426 officers and enlisted
- Armament: 1 × triple 6 in (152 mm)/47 caliber Mark 16 guns; 1 × dual 5 in (127 mm)/38 caliber anti-aircraft guns in Mark 32 mount; 1 × twin-rail Mark 7 Talos SAM launcher, 46 missiles

USS Little Rock (hull numbers: CL-92/CLG-4/CG-4) is a Cleveland-class light cruiser and one of 27 completed for the United States Navy during or shortly after World War II. She is one of six to be converted to guided missile cruisers and the first US Navy ship to be named for Little Rock, Arkansas. Commissioned in mid-1945, she was completed too late to see combat duty during World War II and was retired post-war, becoming part of the Atlantic Reserve Fleet in 1949.

In the late 1950s, she was converted to a Galveston-class guided-missile cruiser, removing her aft six-inch and five-inch guns to accommodate the Talos missile system. Like three other of her sister Cleveland ships converted to missile ships, she was also extensively modified forward to become a flagship. This involved removal of most of her forward armament to allow for an enlarged superstructure and was recommissioned in 1960 as CLG-4 (redesignated CG-4 in 1975). In this configuration, she served in the Mediterranean, often as the Sixth Fleet flagship.

She decommissioned for the final time in 1976 and is now a museum ship, located in Buffalo, New York. She is the last surviving Cleveland-class cruiser.

== Construction and commissioning ==
Little Rock was laid down by William Cramp & Sons Shipbuilding Company, Philadelphia, 6 March 1943; launched 27 August 1944, sponsored by Mrs Sam Wassell and commissioned 17 June 1945.

== Service history ==
=== Cleveland Class Light Cruiser CL-92 (1945–1949) ===
Little Rock departed Philadelphia on 13 July 1945, and sailed via Naval Operating Base Norfolk, Portsmouth, Virginia, for her shakedown training cruise to Guantanamo Bay, Cuba. She returned to Philadelphia, on 30 August for post-shakedown repairs until 26 September, when she commenced local operations out of Newport, Rhode Island, for the training of the prospective crew of the aircraft carrier Princeton (CV-37). On 21 October 1945, Little Rock departed Newport, for a cruise to South America, steaming via San Juan, Puerto Rico, to arrive at Rio de Janeiro, Brazil, on 10 November 1945. She then called at the ports of Chile, including Concepcion Bay; thence to Callao, Peru; and Santa Elena, Ecuador. She completed the transit of the Panama Canal (11–15 March) and after a visit to Cartagena, Colombia (16–18 March), returned to Norfolk on 23 March 1946.

Little Rock sailed on 19 April 1946 for maneuvers with units of the Eighth Fleet in the Caribbean and returned to Philadelphia, on 12 May for repairs. Little Rock then departed on 4 June 1946, for an extended cruise in European waters. On 11 June, she arrived at Plymouth, England. After a voyage to the British Crown Colony of Gibraltar, she visited ports around northern Europe. She returned to Plymouth on 31 July, and then visited Lisbon, Portugal, before arrival at Gibraltar, on 22 August, to commence a tour of the Mediterranean. She called at Naples, Italy (27 August – 3 September); Piraeus, Greece; Valletta, Malta; and Bone, Algeria. She departed Valletta, Malta, on 17 September, and returned to Norfolk, on 27 September 1946. From 21 to 27 November 1946, USS Missouri (BB-63) was en route to Davis Strait as part of Task Group 20.2. Between 27 November and 4 December, she participated in cold-weather exercises, between Greenland and Baffin Island, Canada, as part of Task Group 20.2.

During the deployment, she was firing 5-inch star shells off the port side of Missouri for illumination, when there was a misfire. As the gunner began to point the barrel toward the water, as per standard procedure, the round cooked-off, (thermally induced firing) and struck Missouri on the signal bridge, killing Coxswain Robert Fountain and starting a fire involving an acetylene tank lashed to the railings. Missouri did not return to Norfolk, Virginia, until 13 December 1946.

Little Rock conducted local operations at Norfolk until 21 November 1946, and after operations with Missouri (BB-63) to Argentia, Newfoundland, returned to New York on 13 December 1946. She commenced local operations at Newport, on 9 January 1947, then steamed to Charleston, South Carolina, arriving on 8 February. She embarked Naval Reservists here for a training cruise, departing 10 February for San Juan. She debarked her reservists at Charleston, on 22 February, and sailed that same day for New York, arriving on 25 February 1947.

Little Rock underwent overhaul in the New York Naval Shipyard, Brooklyn, N.Y., until 3 July 1947. After local training operations at Newport, she departed Boston on 22 July for a training cruise to Guantanamo Bay, returning to Newport for further local operations on 30 August 1947.She sailed for the Mediterranean on 10 November, and arrived at Gibraltar to commence operations with the Sixth Fleet on 20 November 1947. During this tour, she visited such ports as Augusta Bay, Naples and Tangiers. During this tour while in Greece, Little Rock participated in helping to suppress communist attempts to take over the country. Upon leaving Greece, Little Rock was sent to Palestine to help re-establish stability after the bombing of the King David Hotel. To enforce this Captain Mee of the Little Rock ordered the ship close to shore and then trained all turrets and 6 in guns on Tel Avia as a deterrent against more attacks against the British and Allies. Afterwards, Little Rock was ordered to Gibraltar, and then departed on 2 March returning to Newport on 11 March 1948. Little Rock's actions during her latest cruise constituted one of the first Cold War Naval Actions against communist forces in Europe as well as provided US support and intervention for the yet new nation of Israel.

Little Rock conducted operations while based at Newport until 13 September 1948. During this time she made four training cruises to the respective ports of Port-au-Prince, Haiti; San Juan Quebec, Canada and St. Thomas, U.S. Virgin Islands (30 July – 15 August). On 13 September 1948, she departed Newport for another tour in the Mediterranean, arriving at Gibraltar on 23 September. During this tour, she again visited the principal ports of the Mediterranean and took part in maneuvers with units of the Sixth Fleet in the operating areas off Malta and Crete. She departed Gibraltar on 14 January 1949, and arrived at Newport on 23 January 1949. She arrived at the Naval Ammunition Depot, Earle, N.J., on 4 February, and after unloading ammunition, entered the New York Naval Shipyard for pre-inactivation overhaul on 8 February 1949. She was placed out of commission on 24 June 1949 and joined the Atlantic Reserve Fleet at New York.

=== Service as Galveston-class guided missile cruiser CLG-4/CG-4 (1957–1976) ===
Little Rock arrived at the yard of the New York Shipbuilding Corporation, Camden, New Jersey, on 13 January 1957, which began conversion of the ship to a guided missile light cruiser on 30 January 1957. Change in classification and hull number from CL-92 to CLG-4 became effective on 23 May 1957. As converted, Little Rock had a full-load displacement of 15,142 tons and was configured as a fleet flagship. New weapon control devices and radars directed her missile battery. Little Rock was delivered to the Philadelphia Naval Shipyard on 6 May 1960, where she was commissioned on 3 June 1960, Capt. Jewett O Phillips Jr. in command. Sen. J. William Fulbright (D-Ark) delivered the address at the commissioning ceremony, attended by 2,000 people.

Little Rock remained in Philadelphia until 25 July 1960, when she had sea trials off of Virginia. Her tests completed, Little Rock sailed for Guantanamo Bay, Cuba, arriving there on 5 September to begin shakedown training. She also visited Port-au-Prince (17–19 September). She left Guantanamo Bay on 15 October, to proceed to the missile firing range off the coast of Puerto Rico. Little Rock also visited St. Thomas (21–23 October). She returned to the Philadelphia Navy Yard, and spent two months at Philadelphia undergoing post-shakedown outfitting.

Little Rock got underway for Norfolk, on 4 January 1961, and left on 9 January 1961, to participate in Atlantic Fleet Exercise l-61, which lasted until 20 January. Departing Philadelphia, on 9 February 1961, Little Rock sailed for her first European cruise in her new role. Upon her arrival in the Mediterranean, she was designated flagship for Commander, Cruiser Division Four (ComCruDiv4). She was relieved by USS Newport News as flagship in August 1961, and returned to the U.S., at Naval Operating Base, Norfolk, in September. A month later, she was designated the flagship for Second Fleet.

Little Rock departed for Bayonne, New Jersey, on 12 February 1962, and then to Nassau, Bahamas. This was her last at-sea period before entering the Norfolk Naval Shipyard in Portsmouth, Virginia, on 15 March, and received a new bow-mounted sonar installation and electronic detection equipment.

The cruiser steamed for the Mediterranean on 1 May 1963, for another deployment with the Sixth Fleet. She relieved USS Springfield as fleet flagship on 11 May. During her eight-month deployment, she visited 17 ports in eight different countries. She was relieved by Springfield on 15 December, at Rota, Spain, and returned to her homeport at Norfolk, on 24 December, in time for the crew to celebrate Christmas. Leave and maintenance occupied the next two months.

The cruiser steamed up the Chesapeake Bay from Norfolk, on 2 June 1963, to the U.S. Naval Academy at Annapolis, Maryland. After embarking midshipmen for their summer cruise, she steamed into the North Atlantic on 4 June, and returned to Norfolk on 24 July. Through the fall, she carried out local operations and on 28 November, she departed Norfolk, bound for missile trials in the Caribbean. She rejoined the Sixth Fleet in the Mediterranean, on 14 December, where she relieved USS Boston. During this 1965 deployment, she visited 13 ports in six countries. During this assignment, she participated in Operation Fairgame, cooperating with ships of the French Navy and other Sixth Fleet units. Little Rock was relieved by USS Albany on 2 June, and began her return to Norfolk, arriving on 10 June. Ten days later, on 20 June, Vice Adm. Kleber S. Masterson broke his flag on board Little Rock as Commander, Second Fleet and NATO Striking Force, Atlantic. She departed on 24 August, for a six-week training exercise in the North Atlantic, during which she visited ports in Europe. Back at Norfolk on 7 October, Little Rock spent the remainder of 1965, in local operations and maintenance. While operating in the Caribbean, on 18 November 1965, Little Rock was ordered to the waters off Santo Domingo, Dominican Republic, during the uncertainty and unrest in that country after the assassination of the Dominican president, Rafael Leónidas Trujillo.

Little Rock entered Norfolk Naval Shipyard on 18 January 1966 for an extensive overhaul. Upon the completion in late September, Little Rock returned to the Norfolk Naval Base. During the months of October and November 1966, the ship training and guided missile trials in the waters off Guantanamo Bay, and afterward, she returned to Norfolk. Departing on 16 January, she steamed for Rota, Spain, and there she relieved Springfield as Sixth Fleet flagship.

Leaving Rota, the ship steamed to Casablanca, Morocco, arriving on 30 January, and departing again on 3 February. Little Rock entered Gaeta, Italy, her new home port, not only for Little Rock, but also for ComSixthFlt, which had previously been home-ported at Villefranche-sur-Mer, France. From 4 February until 14 July, Little Rock spent port time in Gaeta, a three-day visit to Rota, in April. She participated in distant readiness related to the coup in Greece, and the June Arab-Israeli war. From 31 March to 4 April, Little Rock participated in Operation Dawn Clear, a NATO exercise in anti-air (AAW), anti-submarine (ASW), and anti-surface warfare. The flagship participated as a unit of Task Force (TF) 502. A month later, from 2 – 11 May, the cruiser took part in Fairgame VI, providing AAW, ASW, and anti-surface protection to units of TF 502 and TF 503. There she operated with the French cruiser Colbert (C-611), flagship of the French Mediterranean fleet.

==== 1967: Six-Day War, USS Liberty incident ====
During the late spring and early summer, Little Rock was involved in three contingency operations arising out of international events in the Mediterranean. The first occurred in April during the Greek coup. The flagship left Rota, Spain, to join the task force to evacuate U.S. nationals, if necessary. The second and most volatile situation was the June war between the Arab nations and Israel. The ship had been scheduled to get underway on 25 May, for Missilex 14–68, to return on the 27th. On 23 May 1967, the Sixth Fleet received orders to move into the eastern Mediterranean, four days after the United Arab Republic (UAR) [Egypt] had ordered the United Nations Emergency Force (UNEF) to withdraw from the Sinai Peninsula. On 26 May 1967, the UAR remilitarized the Sinai and declared a blockade of the Gulf of Aqaba off the Israeli port of Eilat. An increased Soviet naval presence appeared soon thereafter, as the first Soviet warships transited the Dardanelles from the Black Sea and began more aggressive shadowing of U.S. naval movements. On the night of 24 May, she received news of impending hostilities. Little Rock left Gaeta, on schedule, at 1100, 25 May, but not for the exercise. The ship joined TF 60 and exercised in the central Mediterranean as a part of the task force until 3 June. The war broke out ashore on 5 June 1967, and TF 60 maintained a readiness and Vice Adm. Martin was instructed to keep ships and aircraft at least 100 [nautical miles] away from the coasts of Lebanon, Syria, and Israel, and the United Arab Republic, and at least 25 nautical miles away from Cyprus. On 8 June the USS Liberty was in international waters off the northern coast of the Sinai Peninsula in the afternoon on 8 June 1967, when she was attacked by the Israeli Defense Forces. Thirty-four crewmen were killed and 174 wounded and though she was severely damaged with a 39-by-24-foot hole amidships and a twisted keel, Liberty's crew kept her afloat. At 1719 that same day, USS Davis and USS Massey received verbal orders to proceed at once to assist Liberty. Davis conducted a brief helo transfer of two people and equipment from USS America between 1806 and 1808 and increased speed.

While Liberty steamed slowly away from the coastline, her injured captain remaining on the bridge to inspire his crew, and his men toiling to minimize her damage and keep her afloat, her "black gang" getting and keeping her underway and her small but providentially spared medical department tending to the wounded, Davis (Capt. Harold G. Leahy, Commander Destroyer Squadron 12, embarked) and Massey raced to her aid. Davis worked up to 30 knots during the first watch on 8 June, and maintained that speed during the mid watch on 9 June 1967.

The two destroyers reached the limping Liberty during the morning watch on 9 June 1967, finding her listing to starboard, while the plethora of shell and fragment holes topside, the burned and scarred paintwork, and the gaping torpedo hole in her hull bore mute testimony to the unbridled ferocity of the attack of the previous afternoon.

Davis rang down "all stop" at 0632 on 9 June 1967, and lay-to, launching her motor whaleboat. The boat then made runs between Davis and Liberty, transferring medical and damage control parties. At 1030, two helicopters from USS America rendezvoused with Liberty and began transferring the more seriously wounded to the carrier. An hour later, about 350 miles east of Souda Bay, Crete, America rendezvoused with Liberty. The carrier's crew, as well as Little Rock's, lined every topside vantage point, silent, watching the helicopters bring 50 wounded and nine dead from Liberty to America. As Liberty drew alongside, listing, her sides pocked and perforated with shell, nearly 2,000 of the carrier's crew were on the flight deck and, spontaneously moved by the sight, gave the battered Liberty and her crew a cheer.

Americas medical team worked around the clock removing shell fragments, and treating various wounds and burns.

Once on the scene Little Rock transferred Lt. John C. Cockram, her damage control assistant, in addition to two corpsmen, to Liberty, and took on board some of the less seriously wounded men. Later, Davis transferred two photographers to the ship by helicopter at 1402. As the destroyer's ship's historian later noted proudly, "Davis...established vital ship functions, assisted in cleaning up the ship and provided hot food for the Liberty's crew..." and handled all communications. Lt. Cmdr. William R. Pettyjohn, chief staff officer, ComDesRon 12, assumed the duties as Liberty's executive officer (9–14 June) replacing Lt. Cmdr. Armstrong, who had died of his grievous wounds suffered in the attack. Vice Adm. Martin visited Liberty on 9 June, arriving and departing by helicopter to see the damage firsthand.

Little Rock's sick bay also aided the stricken ship. Most of the seriously wounded men were taken to America, where two Little Rock corpsmen were dispatched to help in the operating room. Eight of the less seriously wounded, however, were cared for in Little Rock's sick bay. The cruiser returned to Gaeta on 19 June, many days after her scheduled return.

==== Continued exercises ====
After the Arab-Israeli Six-Day War, Little Rock increased the pace of visits to friendly ports of call. Little Rock called at various Mediterranean ports and was afterwards engaged in Amphibious Exercise (PHIBLEX) 2-68, 13 August. A major amphibious landing conducted on the coast of Sardinia culminated the exercise. Little Rock participated as a unit of TF 60 and protected the amphibious ships from air and submarine attack and surface raiders during the transit to the beachhead. While at Monaco, the ship was visited by Prince Rainier and Princess Grace.

Little Rock spent the next three weeks in Gaeta. These were followed by more than two weeks of operations Deep Furrow, Eager Beaver, and Dense Crop (22 September – 6 October). These were NATO exercises conducted by ComStrikForSouth and held in the Ionian and Aegean seas. The exercise units included British, Greek, Italian, and Turkish ships participating in major war games between U.S. and Turkish land forces. Little Rock, as a member of TF 502, assisted in supporting the amphibious task force against attack in transit to and landing on Turkish soil. This exercise was followed by a five-day visit to Istanbul (7–12 October). Upon anchoring in the Bosporus, Little Rock was met with hostile demonstrations. The government would not guarantee the safety of U.S. sailors ashore. After 15 days at sea, liberty was cancelled on the first night in Istanbul for all except a small number. The liberty party was forced to take a long boat trip to the Golden Horn to a temporary landing. The normal fleet landing was in the hands of Communist-led demonstrators. The cruiser visited Athens (13–18 October). While there, the ship hosted a luncheon for His Majesty, King Constantine of the Hellenes. The ship next visited Barcelona, Spain, (9–14 November). Little Rock entered a tender availability period in Naples, Italy, from 15 to 27 November. Little Rock returned to Gaeta to spend the Christmas and New Year's holidays in port.

Little Rock was still at her homeport on 1 January 1969. Departing Gaeta on 4 January, she supported the amphibious assault and live firing exercises as a part of PHIBLEX 10-68 at Porto Scudo and Capo Teulada, Sardinia. The amphibious assault was preceded by an opposed transit to the objective area from 5–7 January, in the Tyrrhenian Sea. As a unit of Task Group (TG) 61.5 Little Rock operated in direct support of TF 61 and under operational control of CTF 61. She provided AAW and ASW, as well as playing the part of a surface raider Komar (Fast Patrol Boat of Soviet design)--for protection of the amphibious task force landing during the opposed transit and naval gunfire support upon arrival in the amphibious objective area.

On 1 March 1968, Little Rock began Fairgame VI, a bilateral exercise with the French military, conducted in the western Mediterranean. She joined U.S. and French ships at Lovo Santo, Corsica, France, and observers were exchanged. At 1600 on 2 March, Little Rock sortied as part of TF 502, while the French Hunter-Killer (HUK) Group (TG 514.1) proceeded independently under French command. TF 502, supported by the HUK group, conducted simulated conventional attacks and photo reconnaissance against targets in France, while operating in a hostile submarine area. The French Southern Region Air Defense Forces opposed U.S. Air Opposition and French tactical air force and naval aircraft conducted reconnaissance and attacks against 502 and TG 514.1. Phase Bravo (AAW/ASW) was conducted (3–6 March). Phase Charlie, the opposed transit and combined amphibious landing phase, lasted from 7–10 March. As part of TF 502, Little Rock supported Amphibious Task Force 503 in an opposed transit through the Straits of Bonificio to the Amphibious Objective Area. During the transit, TF 502 and TG 514.1.1 provided AAW and ASW protection against attacks opposing aircraft, submarines, and simulated missile patrol boats. On 10 March, bendex was called and all attacks and all units entered the anchorage at Lovo Santo. The exercise resolved coordination issues between Sixth Fleet and French forces.

Little Rock participated in Operation Dawn Patrol 68 (29 April – 10 May). Little Rock's primary role was AAW and ASW support for two amphibious squadrons, TG 503.1 and TG 503.2. Shangri-La (CVA-38) provided aircraft for both Strike and Combat Air Patrol (CAP) and Italian and British forces also participated. At the completion of the exercise, the cruiser steamed to Athens (11–14 May), then to Naples (15–17 May), before returning to Gaeta. While in port, she underwent an operational readiness inspection. The ship departed Gaeta on 17 June, conducting type training in the Ionian and Tyrrhenian Seas until 22 June. She participated in the Sixth Fleet's 20th anniversary commemoration of the fleet's founding on 25 June, and then spent a time at Gaeta (26 June – 9 July). Departing her homeport, she participated in a submarine opposed transit exercise on 10 July, and was visited by Secretary of the Navy Paul R. Ignatius on 10–11 July. After being back at Gaeta (13–22 July), Little Rock got underway on 23 July, and visited Valencia, Spain (25–29 July) and Palma, Mallorca, Spain (30 July – 3 August), before returning to Gaeta, on 5 August. The ship participated in the Sixth Fleet change of command at Naples, on 14 August, and after a return to Gaeta (15–18 August), she got underway to participate in Exercise Deep Furrow 68 as part of TG 502.1 (17–23 August).

Departing Gaeta on 4 January 1969, Little Rock participated in PHIBLEX 8-69, an exercise for the Amphibious Task Force to conduct an opposed transit and assault landing at Capo Teulada, Sardinia. Little Rock operated as a surface raider, simulating a Soviet Sverdlov-class cruiser conducting simulated surface attacks on the Amphibious Task Force until 8 January. Later, she became a part of the friendly forces, entered the Amphibious Objective Area and conducted Naval Gunfire Support (NGFS), in support of the Amphibious Assault. Little Rock was detached late on 8 January, for transit to Taranto, Italy, for a port visit, (10–13 January). Underway again, she shifted to Villefranche (15–18 January), and then back to Gaeta on 19 January. The flagship again took leave of Gaeta on 2 March, to join TF 60 in the Ionian Sea, for participation in Exercise National Week II. Affecting her rendezvous on 3 March, the flagship defended the task force from air and surface attacks, "while maintaining a sustained anti-submarine posture. She detached late on 5 March, to proceed to Souda Bay, in order that ComSixthFlt could visit the naval base there. Departing Souda Bay, the following day, the flagship steamed for Gaeta, conducting Engineering Casualty Control Exercises en route, arriving on 8 March.

Little Rock remained in port until 15 April 1969, when she got underway bound for Palma, conducting type training while en route. She conducted a port visit (17–21 April) and upon her departure, sped to join TG 60.2 in the Ionian Sea for the NATO Exercise Dawn Patrol 69. The flagship joined TG 60.2 and transferred to NATO control, becoming part of TG 502.2 and provided support for the amphibious task force. She operated with the carrier unit, providing air defense to the task group and in-depth ASW surface support. On 30 April, Little Rock detached from the supporting group (TG 502.2) and joined the Amphibious Task Force (TF 503) in the objective area, providing simulated naval gunfire support for the assault forces. During the exercise, the flagship was visited by Adm.Thomas H. Moorer, Chief of Naval Operations. Little Rock detached and transferred to national control on 30 April, for transit to Gaeta, arriving on 1 May. She departed Gaeta, on 12 May, she proceeded to join TF 60 in the Ionian Sea, for Exercise National Week III, joining the task force on 22 May, upon the commencement of the exercise. She operated as an AAW picket station, providing air, surface, and sub-surface defense. Detaching on 25 May, Little Rock returned to Gaeta, the next afternoon. The flagship was again underway on 3 June conducting various exercises en route to join TG 502.2 in the Ionian Sea for Exercise Olympic Express, one of a series of major exercises in the southern European region, involving NATO land, sea, and air forces employed in the defense of a NATO country from aggression. The basic concept involved a NATO Amphibious Task Force (TF 503) forming at Souda Bay, and conducting an opposed transit into the Aegean Sea for an amphibious assault at Kavalla, Greece. The flagship reverted to NATO control on 4 June, joining TG 502.2. Task Unit (TU) 502.2.4 (Defense Unit Bravo) was formed, in which Little Rock operated, remaining in the vicinity of the carrier to provide AAW, missile, ASW, and surface defense to the carrier group.

Little Rock steamed out of Gaeta on 7 July 1969, bound for the Malta Missilex Area in the Ionian Sea, to fire two Talos missiles and conduct exercises on 8 July. Afterward, she steamed to Monaco, and conducted a port visit (11–15 July), where she was again visited by the Prince and Princess of Monaco. At the conclusion of the port call, she returned to Gaeta on the 17th, refueling en route. Getting underway on 28 July, and conducting training en route, she arrived at Rota, on 1 August. Little Rock departed on 5 August, en route to Exercise PHIBLEX 2-70, which began on 6 August. During the exercise, the flagship simulated a Soviet Kresta-class guided-missile cruiser with surface-to-surface cruise missiles. From 6–9 August, she carried out her role, conducting surface-to-surface missile attacks against the Amphibious Task Force and its supporting forces. On 10 August, she switched roles and became a part of the "Blue" forces entering the Amphibious Objective Area to observe the assault landing to conduct live naval gunfire support for the landing. Detaching on 10 August, she proceeded to Gaeta, arriving there on 11 August. Little Rock received a grade of outstanding on her Annual Nuclear Weapons Proficiency Inspection on 19 August. The cruiser was again underway on 25 August, to join TF 60 in the Ionian Sea for Exercise National Week IV. She joined the task force in the Ionian Sea on 26 August, to operate as an AAW picket, controlling interceptor aircraft and defending TF 60 from air, surface, and sub-surface missile attacks. She detached and refueled on 28 August 28, returning to Gaeta, the following day.

On 30 August 1969, the emergency recall bill was affected in response to the Palestinian hijacking of an American jetliner. Little Rock proceeded to sea on 4 September, for special contingency operations with TF 60. The operation was highlighted by the sighting of the Soviet helicopter carrier Moskva. These special operations were terminated for the flagship on 10 September, at which time she proceeded to Taranto, for a ComSixthFlt briefing. She arrived the morning of 11 September, and departed the same day, arriving in Gaeta, on the 13th. Underway again on 23 September, she was bound for a visit to Dubrovnik. She departed on 29 September, en route to Athens (1–6 October). Afterward, she steamed back to Gaeta (8–15 October). Underway again, she joined TG 60.1 in the Ionian Sea on 16 October for Deep Furrow 69. The major concept of the exercise was for an Amphibious Task Force to form at Souda Bay, and conduct an opposed transit through the Aegean Sea, and conduct an assault landing at Saros Bay, Turkey. Little Rock operated under NATO control from 17 to 25 October, as part of the supporting group (TG 502.1) providing air, ASW, and surface defense for the Amphibious Task Force and its supporting elements. Little Rock was assigned many duties, including air intercept control, Grumman F-14 Tomcat control, plane guard duties, ASW screening duties and NGFS of the assault landing. Deep Furrow 69 completed for U.S. forces on 25 October, and immediately a special contingency operation was placed in effect in the Ionian Sea and was carried out until 4 November 4, at which time TG 60.1, including Little Rock, entered Athens for rest and relaxation. The flagship remained in Athens until 8 November, when she got underway en route to Naples for a scheduled tender availability with Grand Canyon (AD-28). The flagship arrived in Naples on 10 November 10. She completed the tender availability and got underway for Gaeta on 22 November, arriving the same day. On 2 December, she got underway for Valletta, arriving the next day. Getting underway again on 6 December, Little Rock steamed for a missile exercise with TG 60.2. Due to adverse weather, however, the exercise was cancelled and the cruiser proceeded to Toulon, France, arriving on the 9th. En route the flagship rendezvoused with Neosho (AO-143) and units of Task Force 60 for refueling. After only a one-day operational visit, the flagship got underway on 10 December, to participate in Exercise Mediterranean, a U.S.-French bilateral exercise. The exercise was a combined operation which involved land, sea and air forces. Little Rock operated with the "Blue" forces as an AAW picket ship, providing air, missile, and anti-submarine protection. During the course of the exercise, she assumed tactical command of the Blue supporting forces for the opposed transit of the Strait of Bonificio. On completion of the transit, the cruiser returned to the assigned AAW picket station. She detached on 13 December and proceeded to Lovo Santo, to join the Amphibious Task Force and provided pre-H-hour simulated NGFS. On completion of the scheduled firing, the flagship detached and proceeded to Gaeta. Arriving on 13 December, the flagship began a holiday leave period which lasted into January 1970.

Little Rock was underway again on 7 January 1970, bound for Villefranche. En route, she conducted a successful gunfire exercise with Hoist (AFS-40) and rearmed from Suribachi (AE-21). John Warner, Under Secretary of the Navy, was embarked in the ship from Villefranche to Genoa, Italy. After visiting Genoa (13–15 January), Little Rock proceeded to Gaeta, arriving 16 January. En route, an underway replenishment (UNREP) was conducted from USS Sylvania and USS Concord. She refueled at the Nata fuel pier on 26 January, and the ship got underway for the first exercise of the year, National Week V, on 30 January. This exercise required a great deal of coordination among units of the Sixth Fleet. On 2 February, Little Rock joined TG 60.l in the Ionian Sea. She conducted an UNREP from Neosho, and once again rearmed from Suribachi. En route to the rendezvous, the flagship conducted an anti-air gunfire exercise utilizing a sleeve towed by an aircraft. At 0800 on 3 February, National Week V commenced and shortly thereafter, Little Rock gained a sonar contact. USS Robert H. McCard, which was in company with the cruiser, was vectored over the contact for a simulated attack. During subsequent events, the contact was classified as a submarine by the sighting of a periscope. On completion of the exercise, she returned to Gaeta, arriving on 6 February. She cleared Gaeta on 20 February, for her annual western swing of the Mediterranean, and en route to Tangier, she successfully completed another anti-air gunfire exercise. After a four-day visit in Tangier (23–26 February), she shifted to Gibraltar (27–28 February), before moving on to Lisbon (3–6 March), Rota (8 March), and Barcelona (10–13 March) Little Rock departed on 14 March for Gaeta, refueling from Neosho en route. The cruiser was once again underway on 3 April, to participate in National Week VI. She participated in this exercise (4–5 April) in the Ionian Sea. On commencement of the exercise, Little Rock operated as a unit of Task Group 60.1, but she shifted to Task Group 60.2 on 5 April, for refueling from Waccamaw (AO-109). She rejoined TG 60.1, the next day and on the 7th, Adm. Bernard A. Clarey, Vice Chief of Naval Operations, arrived by helicopter to confer with ComSixthFlt. At the conclusion of the conference, Adm. Clarey departed by highline to USS King. During the time Admiral Clarey was on board, Little Rock participated in a surface multiple ship tracking exercise and an air-intercept control exercise. Because of the ship's primary mission as a flagship, independent operations, there were few opportunities for conducting competitive exercises. On completion of all exercises on 7 April, the ship proceeded to Valletta, refueling again from Waccamaw en route.

Little Rock got underway for Palma, Spain, on 23 May 1970. The ship spent five days in Palma, departing on 30 May. That same day, Little Rock arrived at Ciudadella, Minorca, Spain, to participate in ceremonies honoring Adm. David G. Farragut. She set a course for Athens, and departed on 31 May, briefly participating in NATO Exercise Dawn Patrol 70, which consisted of providing anti-air and surface warfare support for a U.S. Amphibious Task Group transiting from Naples, to Porto Scudo, Sardinia. The ship provided simulated shore bombardment support to the amphibious assault force, which was simulating the evacuation of U.S. nationals from Porta Scudo. She, on 5 June, proceeded to Athens, and arrived on the 8th. She refueled from USS Mississinewa en route and on 1 June, while transiting Kitharan Passage, she was taken under simulated attack by four Greek fast patrol boats operating as enemy units in Dawn Patrol. The flagship remained in Athens four days, getting underway on 12 June, to resume participation in the NATO exercise. The ship's assignment was to provide simulated shore bombardment for the amphibious assault group at Pythron, Greece. At 0446, on 13 June, a collision occurred with an errant Greek destroyer, Longhi (DD.656), which was also participating in the exercise. After an assessment of damage, considered minor, both ships continued with their assigned missions.

Little Rock departed for Valencia, Spain, on 29 July 1970, for a five-day port visit. On 4 August, the flagship departed Valencia for Capo Teulada, where she participated in a live shore bombardment on 5 August. The cruiser proceeded for Gaeta, that same day, for the last time as Sixth Fleet flagship. On 20 August, Little Rock was joined in Gaeta by Springfield and at 1000, on 22 August, Commander, Sixth Fleet shifted his flag from Little Rock to USS Springfield. The former departed Gaeta for the last time, en route to the ship's new homeport at Newport. She embarked 36 dependents for transport to Newport, Virginia, a trip authorized by the Chief of Naval Operations as a pilot program for possible future endeavors. She arrived at Rota on 27 August, at which time she transferred from U.S. Naval Forces, Europe (USNAVEUR) to Commander in Chief, Atlantic Fleet (CINCLANTFLT) after 44 months of duty as flagship for Commander, Sixth Fleet. After refueling at Rota, the cruiser proceeded on a course of eight days of steady steaming and arrived in Newport on 8 September. She remained in port, until 5 October, during which time, she was given a Board of Inspection and Survey (INSURV) (14–18 September) and numerous other inspections in preparation for a shipyard overhaul. On 5 October, Little Rock proceeded to Naval Weapons Station, Yorktown, Virginia, where she off-loaded all ammunition from 6–8 October. Upon completion, the ship proceeded to Norfolk for a short visit. Afterward, on 10 October, Little Rock steamed for Boston, where she arrived on 12 October to commence a much-needed overhaul. She shifted, on 13 November, to Drydock No. 3, South Annex, Boston Naval Shipyard, where she remained through the remainder of the year.

During the major shipyard overhaul, which concluded in April 1971, most of the electronic and operational equipment aboard Little Rock was reworked or replaced and the primary new installation was the Anti-Ship Missile Defense (ASMD) System. At the completion of her yard work, Little Rock undocked and cleared the Boston Navy Yard, on 19 April and returned to Newport the next day. She remained in port until the 28th, when she got underway for at-sea operations in the operating area off Newport. Returning on the 29th, she remained in port until 3 May. During this time, on 1 May, Little Rock was assigned to Commander, Flotilla 10, Commander, Cruiser Destroyer Squadron, Atlantic Fleet (ComCruDesLant). Underway on 4 May, she conducted training on the operation of the ASMD system in the Newport area until the 6th, then steamed south to Yorktown, for ammunition load-out, continuing AASMD training en route. After taking on her ammunition on 10–11 May, she shifted to Norfolk (12–16 May) to conduct NGFS, mine warfare, and ASW training at the Fleet Training Center facilities. She got underway on 17 May and conducted additional training in the Virginia Capes Operating Area on AAW, seamanship and ASMD. With her training completed on 20 May, she steamed north to Newport. Arriving on 21 May, she remained in port until June.

Little Rock steamed out of Newport on 11 June, for a ten-week refresher-training period in the Caribbean. During that time, her administrative organization was changed on 1 July 1971, to the Cruiser Destroyer Force, Atlantic Fleet. During her Caribbean deployment she made port visits and conducted training at Guantanamo Bay, Roosevelt Roads, Puerto Rico, Culebra, Puerto Rico, and St. Thomas, Virgin Islands, having fired her NGFS qualification at Culebra, on 16 August, the cruiser steamed back to Newport, arriving on 20 August. While in port, extensive habitability improvements were made to the ship. Departing on 22 September, en route to Yorktown, she loaded ammunition at Yorktown (23–25 September), before setting her course for the Caribbean and four weeks of operations and weapons training off Puerto Rico and the Virgin Islands. With her training completed, she returned to Yorktown on 22 October, to conduct missile transfer and departed that same day, for a return to Newport. Arriving on 23 October, she remained in port through November. She sortied on 1 December, bound for another Sixth Fleet deployment. Crossing the Atlantic with the carrier USS John F. Kennedy, the fast replenishment ship USS Seattle, and the ships of DesRon2, the ships conducted extensive seamanship and tactical drills during the crossing and after touching at Rota on 9 December, she was transferred to the operational control of the Sixth Fleet and returned to the Mediterranean. During ASW exercises while en route to Naples, on 12 December, Little Rock received congratulations from ComSixthFlt for her sonar proficiency. Arriving at Naples, on 16 December, she was assigned to TG 60.2. She spent the Christmas holiday in port at Naples, then got underway on the 26th, bound for a port visit to Malaga (29 December) and then to at-sea special operations to year's end.

At the start of 1972, Little Rock was underway conducting special operations in the western Mediterranean until 11 January. Afterward, she visited Livorno, Italy (12–17 January), then steamed to conduct operations with TG 60.2 in the Ionian Sea (18–26 January). She then anchored at Phaleron Bay, Athens (27 January – 3 February) before getting underway on 4 February to participate in National Week XII through the 8th. Anchoring in Augusta Bay, Sicily, Italy, on 9 February, she steamed to Trieste, Italy, for a port visit (12–16 February). Getting underway again on 17 February, she steamed to the Ionian Sea and conducted operations with TG 60.2 to 23 February, and then anchored at Phaleron Bay (24 February – 8 March). Returning to sea, she conducted operations in the Aegean Sea (11–13 March), before making a port visit to Thessaloniki, Greece (14–17 March). Weighing anchor and getting underway on 18 March, she steamed independently in the eastern Mediterranean until the 23rd, and then returned to Phaleron Bay, where she anchored until 3 April. Departing on the 4th, Little Rock operated in the Tyrrhenian Sea until 9 April. Involved in the Operation Rivets training exercise on 10 April, she received orders cutting short her Mediterranean deployment. She was being recalled to the U.S. to relieve Newport News, which had been ordered to Vietnam. Steaming independently for a return home, she refueled at Rota, on 15 April, then continued across the Atlantic. Little Rock moored at Norfolk on 23 April, and on the same day Vice Adm. Vincent P. de Poix, Commander, Second Fleet, embarked and broke his flag on board. The cruiser departed the next day and steamed to Newport (25 April – 1 May), before returning to Norfolk on 4 May. The flagship resumed operations on 15 May to participate in Operation Exotic Dancer V. Upon the exercise's completion on 22 May, she steamed to Yorktown, to conduct her ammunition load-out (23 May) and shifted to Norfolk. She was soon underway again on 25 May, steaming north for a return to Newport. Arriving on 26 May, she conducted a post-deployment stand-down and remained in port until 20 June.

Little Rock resumed operations underway on 21 June 1972, when she set a course for New York for a port visit (23–25 June), en route to an ammunition load-out at Yorktown (27 June), and an in port period at Norfolk into July. Vice Adm. Douglas C. Plate relieved Vice Adm. de Poix, as ComSecondFlt on 19 July, and the next day, the cruiser was underway en route to Newport, where she stood in port from 21 July – 9 August. Clearing Newport on 1 August, she steamed south to Norfolk, where she arrived on the 10th, and remained in port until 16 August. After independent steaming exercises on 17–18 August, she returned to Norfolk, and prepared for a deployment to European waters. Departing on 24 August, she crossed the Atlantic and raised Liverpool, England, on 1 September. She remained there until 3 September, when she departed for port visits to Cherbourg, France (5–7 September) and Rotterdam, Netherlands (9–11 September), prior to participating in Exercise Strong Express (14–28 September). With the completion of the exercise, she entered the harbor at Rosyth, Scotland, on 30 September, and conducted a port visit to 4 October. She then continued her itinerary of calls at European ports with visits to Bergen, Norway (5–8 October), Hamburg, West Germany [Germany] (10–13 October), and Lisbon (15–19 October). Clearing the Portuguese capital, Little Rock steamed back across the Atlantic and arrived at Norfolk on 25 October, where she remained in port until the 31st. En route to Newport, she arrived the next day and remained in port until 13 November. She then got underway bound for Yorktown and an ammunition load out (15 November), before she steamed back northward. Arriving at Melville, Rhode Island, on 16 November, she shifted to Newport, the next day and remained there until 6 December. Getting underway, she steamed to the Boston Navy Yard, and docked for a restricted availability through the end of the year.

Little Rock began 1973 at the Boston Naval Shipyard for conversion to the Navy Distillate Fuel System and installation of satellite communication equipment, as well as other yard work. She completed her maintenance period and undocked on 13 May. Departing the next day, she shifted to Newport, where she underwent preparation for overseas deployment to 10 August. She steamed to Yorktown, on 11 August, and conducted her ammunition on-load (13–14 August). Having shifted to Norfolk, she steamed through the Virginia capes during the afternoon on 15 August, bound for a return to the Sixth Fleet. Touching at Rota, on 26 August, she arrived at Gaeta, on the 29th, and relieved Springfield as flagship two days later. The ship's initial visit as flagship was to Athens (13–18 September) before shifting to Antalya, Turkey, for an Operation Deep Furrow 73 pre-exercise brief. Departing on the 19th, she participated in Deep Furrow 73 (20–29 September) before arriving at Istanbul, for a port visit (30 September – 5 October). Having passed through the Dardanelles en route to Gaeta, she received orders on 6 October, directing her to join TF 60 for special operations stemming from the Arab countries' attack on Israel (Yom Kippur/Ramadan War). With the unexpected outbreak of the war, Little Rock answered the call for an accelerated condition of combat readiness. She sailed in eastern Mediterranean waters throughout the Arab-Israeli conflict as a deterrent against possible outside intervention, as well as to provide evacuation assistance to U.S. citizens in the endangered area. She continued in this capacity until 4 November, when she detached from TF 60 and steamed to Gaeta, arriving on the 6th. Departing two days later, she rejoined TF 60 (9–17 November) before returning to Gaeta, on 17 November. She steamed to Tunis, Tunisia, on 5 December, and arriving the next day she became the first American ship to visit an Arab port since the outbreak of the war.

Little Rock participated with units of TF 60, TF 63, TF 69, and TF 67 in National Week XVI (15–20 February 1974), a Sixth Fleet exercise which evaluated the fleet's capability to locate and track units of potentially hostile forces in the Mediterranean. After returning to Gaeta (22–26 February), she called at Palma (28 February – 3 March), before participating in PHIBLEX 9-74 (5–7 March) at Porto Scudo. The exercise involved an opposed amphibious transit supported by carrier striking forces, surface and submarine photo reconnaissance of the amphibious objective area, mine sweeping, and underwater demolition team (UDT) operations. The landing assault phase included naval gunfire support and close air support followed by troop maneuvers ashore. Afterward, she returned to Gaeta (8 March – 19 April) before getting underway to conduct a Missilex (21–23 April) at Namfi, Greece, before moving on to Mykonos, Greece (28 April – 1 May). The cruiser then got underway to participate in Dawn Patrol (3–8 May), the major NATO exercise which included AAW, ASW, and anti-surface raider training, with an opposed transit that culminated in an amphibious assault. After returning to Gaeta (9–20 May), Little Rock visited Split, Yugoslavia [Croatia] (23–26 May) and Corfu, Greece (28–31 May), then conducted training at Souda Bay (2–3 June) before participating in International Week II (4–9 June) with allied forces for combined training. The cruiser had time in port at Gaeta (11–24 June), then moved to Villefranche (27–30 June) and Toulon (1–4 July) for port visits, before returning to her homeport on 6 July. With the outbreak of the Cyprus Crisis between Greece and Turkey, the flagship conducted special operations in the eastern Mediterranean (15–22 July). En route to a return home, she visited Alexandria, Egypt (29 July – 1 August), and raised Gaeta, on 4 August. She got underway and conducted additional operations in response to the Cyprus Crisis (15–22 August), before returning to Gaeta and remaining in port (23 August – 17 September), with a routine rest of the year.

Little Rock was in port on New Year's Day 1975, and remained there until 15 January, when she shifted to Palermo, Italy (16–19 January) before beginning her annual western Mediterranean cruise. She got underway only once before June, to conduct a second Missilex at Salto DiGuirra (22–23 April). Little Rock's designation was changed to CG-4 on 1 July, in accordance with a navy-wide re-classification of all naval vessels. Departing on 4 July, the cruiser was at Port Said, Egypt, the next day, and was the only U.S. vessel present at the re-opening of the Suez Canal, after Sixth Fleet ships had cleared the canal of mines and debris from the 1967 and 1973 Arab-Israeli wars. She transited through the canal and arrived at Ismailia, Egypt, the next day. From the canal she visited Alexandria (7–9 July), then proceeded to Dubrovnik (12–14 July), before participating in Dawn Patrol with TG 60.2 and TF 61. From 17 to 19 June, she was in training at the anchorage at Taranto, then on 23 June, she was at the training anchorage at Porto Scudo. At the conclusion of the exercise, she returned to Gaeta, where she remained until 7 August, getting underway for National Week XVIII to train with units of TG 60.1 and TG 60.2 (10–14 August). Little Rock returned to Gaeta, on 16 August, where she remained in port into September, but for a visit to Rota (28–31 August). She underwent a tender availability at Naples, from 10 September through 18 October, then steamed to Rota (22–25 October), before returning to her homeport on 28 October. While at Gaeta, she underwent INSURV and then got underway for a third Missilex, this time at Namfi (13–14 November). She made her return to Gaeta, via Izmir (17–20 November), arriving on 22 November. The cruiser spent most of December in port, with the exception of her participation in PHIBLEX 6-76, with units from TG 60.1 and TF 61 (17–22 December).

==== Final year in service ====
Little Rock resumed operations underway on 16 January 1976, when she cleared Gaeta, bound for Casablanca (20–23 January) and Villefranche (27–30 January). Returning to Gaeta (31 January – 2 February), she shifted to Naples on 2 February and underwent a tender availability until the 21st. After a time at her home port (21 February – 1 March), the cruiser made the first port visit to Athens (3–6 March) since the 1973 Cyprus Crisis. Upon leaving Athens, she participated in National Week XX (10–15 March), which saw Little Rock at the center of the tight circular formation maneuvering with the other ships of the Sixth Fleet. The ships then proceeded into port at Gaeta, and dropped anchor, then engaged in commemorative events for the U.S. Bicentennial.

She remained in port into April and then got underway on 3 April 1976, to visit Toulon (5–9 April), conducting training en route. She returned to Gaeta (10–25 April), and then participated in Exercise Dixie Jargon (25–27 April), in the western Mediterranean. After time in port at Gaeta (27–30 April), she was underway en route to the eastern Mediterranean to participate in Dawn Patrol 1976, when she experienced an engineering casualty, causing her spend time at Naples (2–7 May) undergoing repairs. At the completion of that work, she was underway, returning to the eastern Mediterranean for Dawn Patrol (7–13 May), before returning to Gaeta, on the 13th. Departing on 5 June, she steamed to Dubrovnik, and conducted a port visit (8–13 June) and then she conducted a dependents' cruise to Bari, Italy (13–16 June). Afterward, she was involved in extended operations off the coast of Lebanon, Operation Fluid Drive (17–25 June), directing the evacuation of U.S. civilians and foreign nationals from Beirut, during the Lebanese Civil War. Touching at Catania, Italy (25–26 June), she returned to Gaeta, on 27 June. Little Rock was relieved by Albany as Sixth Fleet flagship effective 1 July 1976, and departing three days later, she steamed to sea for training and a visit to Cannes (6–7 July), returning to Gaeta, later on the 7th. Getting underway on 13 July, she conducted on last Missilex in the eastern Mediterranean (15–16 July). Returning to her homeport (19–21 July), she returned to the eastern Mediterranean for additional operations as part of Fluid Drive (22–29 July). She returned to Gaeta, and remained there until 19 August. During this time in port, on 1 August, she received orders changing her homeport to the Philadelphia Navy Yard. After a visit to Augusta Bay (21–22 August), she conducted operations as part of National Week XXI (23–27 August), then returned to Gaeta, for the final time. While in port, ComSixthFlt shifted his flag to Albany on 7 September.

==== Decommissioning and awards ====
Departing Gaeta on 9 September, Little Rock steamed out of the Mediterranean past Gibraltar and into the Atlantic. Arriving at Lisbon (13–16 September), she conducted one last port visit. Clearing the Portuguese capital on 16 September, she steamed westward for her return to the United States. Arriving at Naval Weapons Station, Yorktown, on 25 September, she berthed and off-loaded her ordnance. She returned to the Philadelphia Navy Yard, on 1 October, and began preparations for decommissioning.

Little Rock (CLG-4) was awarded:

- Navy "E" Ribbon for the period 1 July 1974 – 30 June 1975.
- American Campaign Medal
- World War II Victory Medal
- National Defense Service Medal
- Armed Forces Expeditionary Medal for her service during the period 20–26 January 1962,

== Museum ship (1979–present) ==
Decommissioned and stricken from the Naval Vessel Register on 22 November 1976, Little Rock was donated to the Buffalo Naval and Servicemen's Park, later renamed the Buffalo and Erie County Naval and Military Park, in Buffalo, N.Y., to serve as a museum ship. She was towed from Philadelphia, via the St. Lawrence Seaway, to Buffalo, and arrived in July 1977.

She is currently open to the public at the Buffalo Naval & Military Park. On 16 December 2017, Little Rock was present for the commissioning of USS Little Rock (LCS-9), the first time a U.S. Navy ship commissioned alongside her namesake.

== Gallery ==
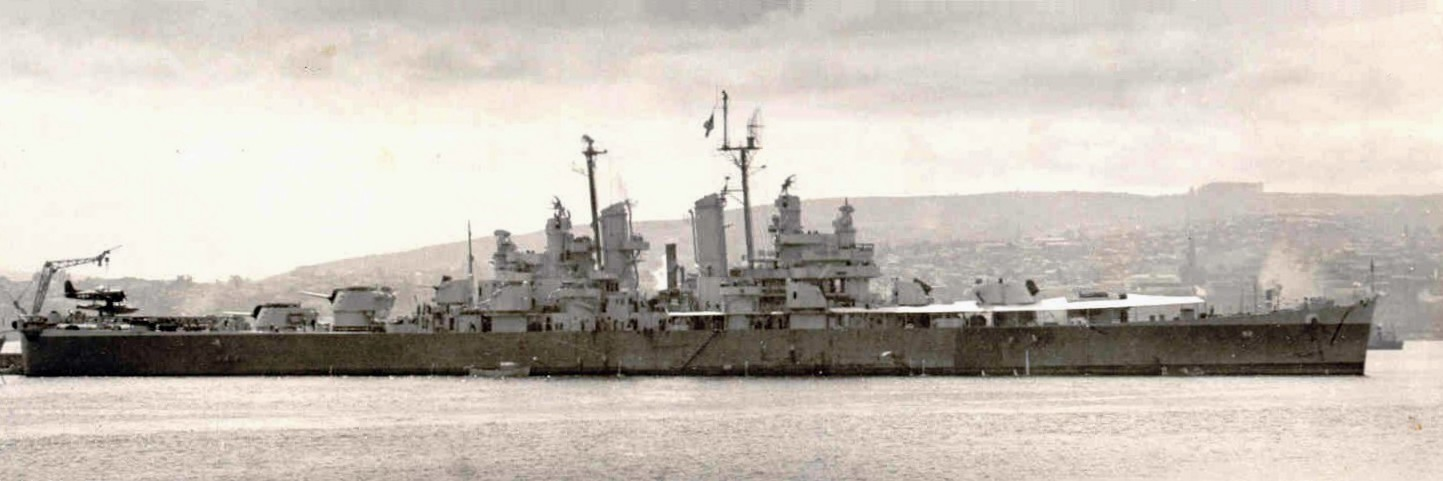
Little Rock as light cruiser CL-92 at Valparaíso, Chile, 1946

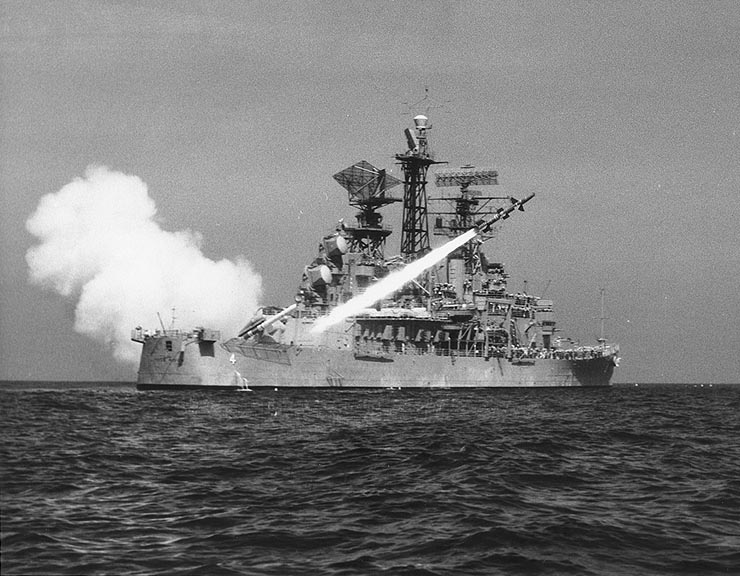
Little Rock firing a RIM-8 Talos in 1961

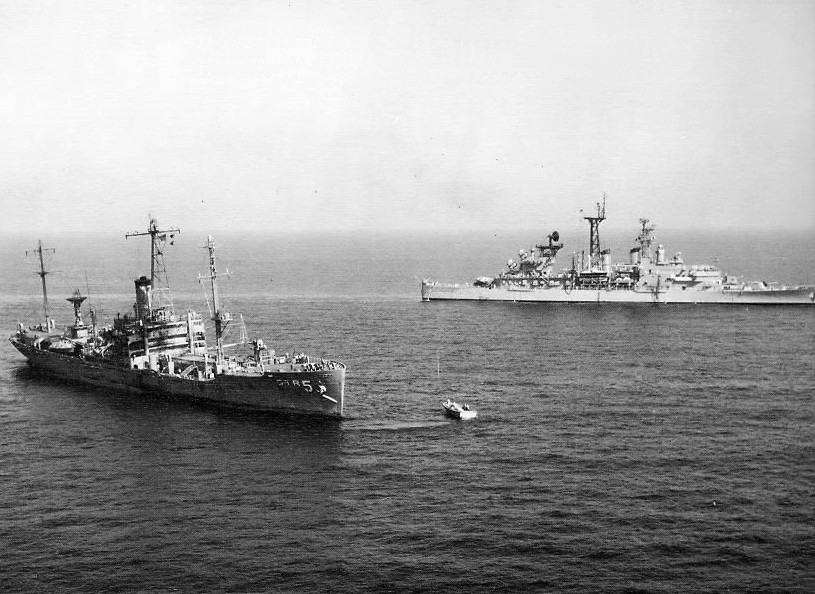
Little Rock standing by the stricken USS Liberty (AGTR-5), June 1967

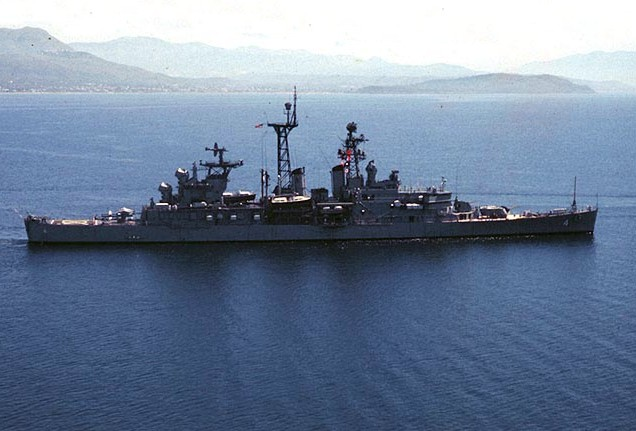
Little Rock in the Mediterranean Sea, 1974

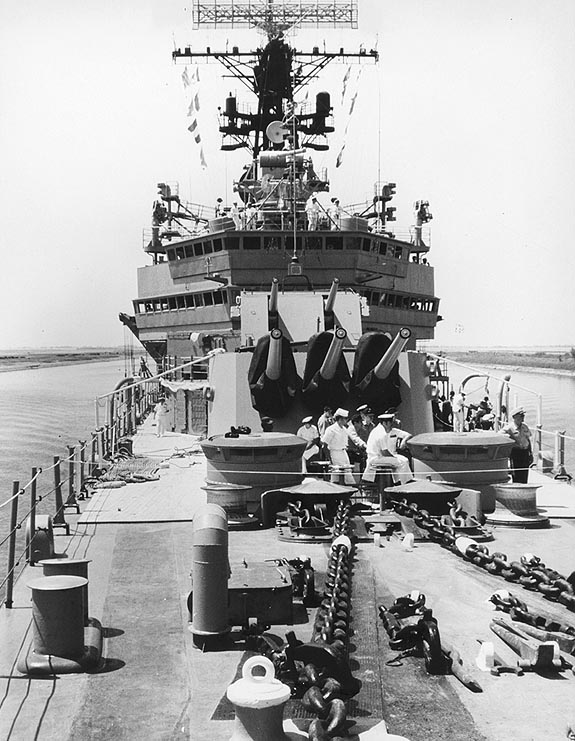
Little Rock in the Suez Canal, 5 June 1975

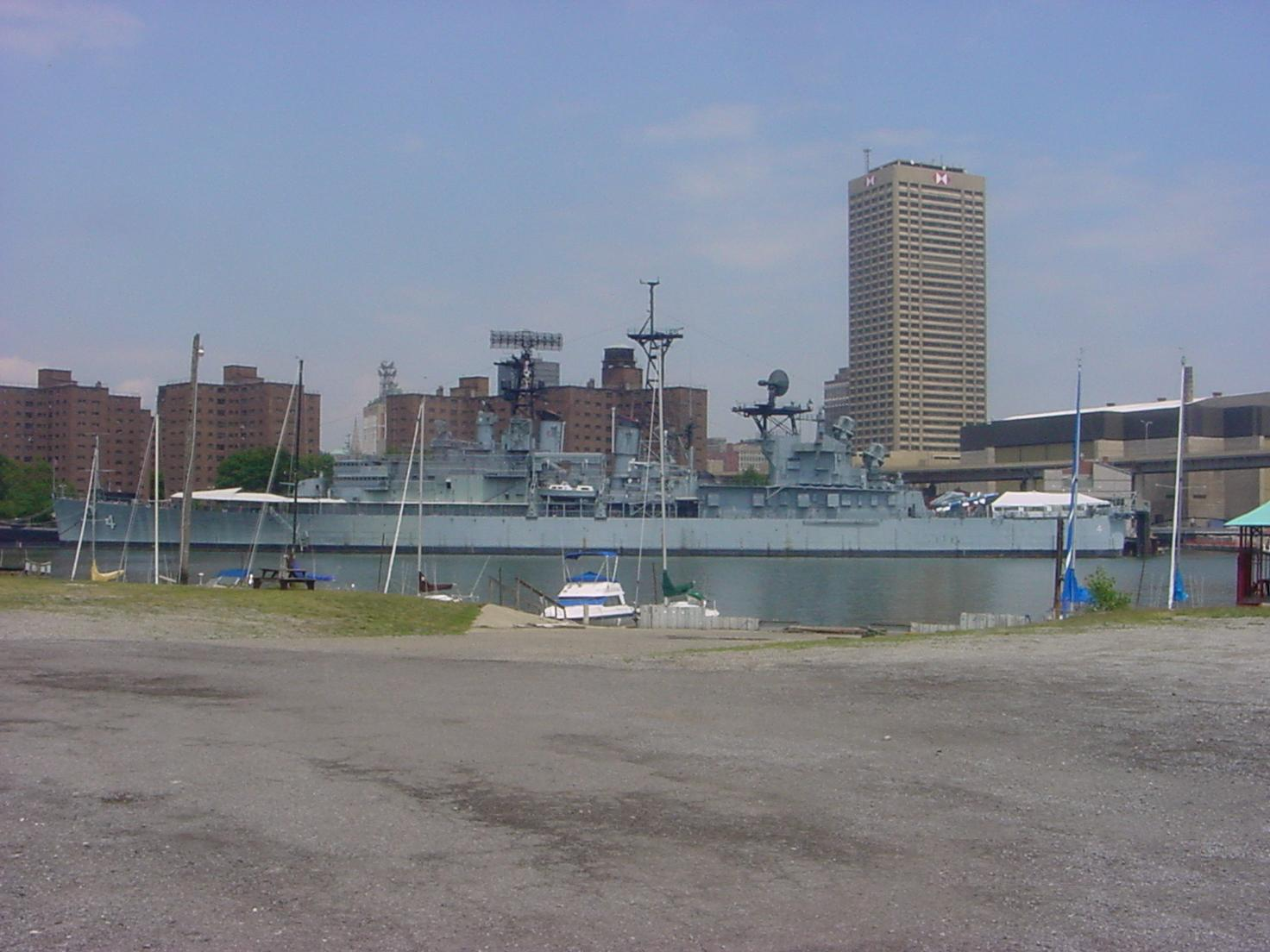
Little Rock at the Buffalo Naval & Military Park, Buffalo, New York

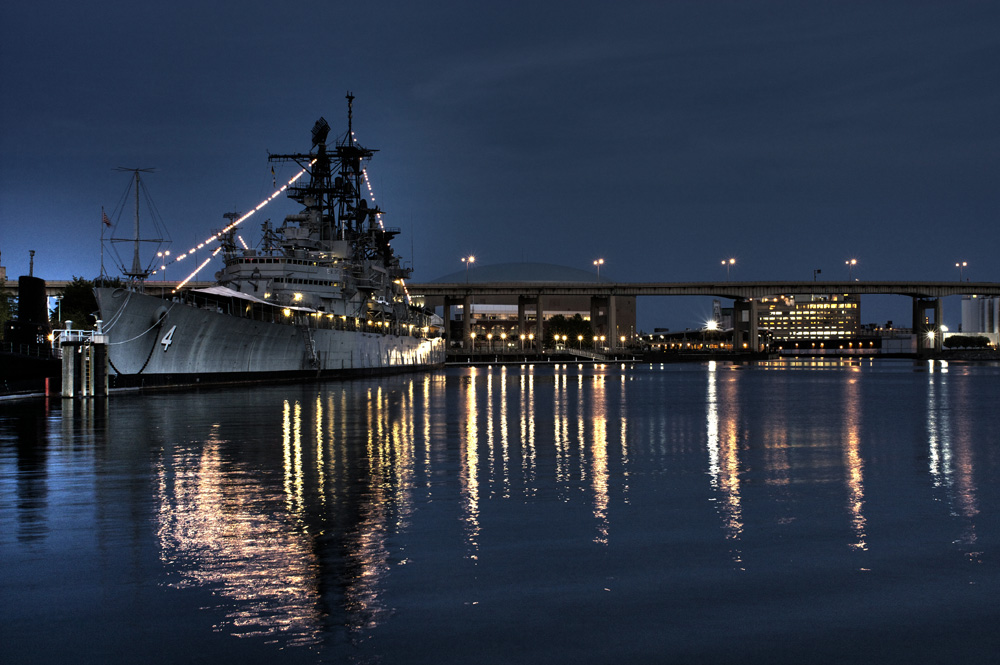
Little Rock at the Buffalo Naval & Military Park, Buffalo, New York

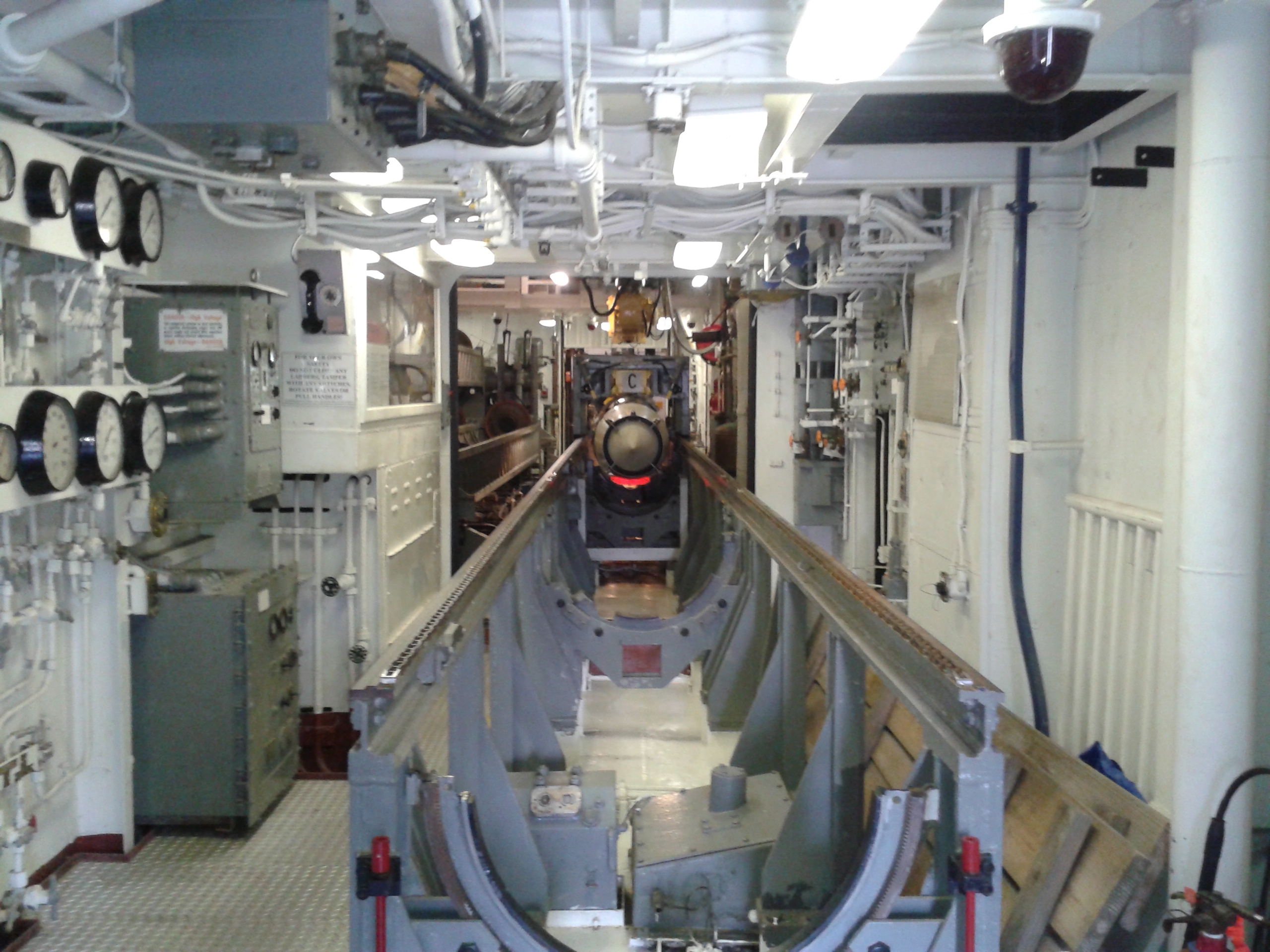
RIM-8 Talos missile loading conveyor aboard the ship

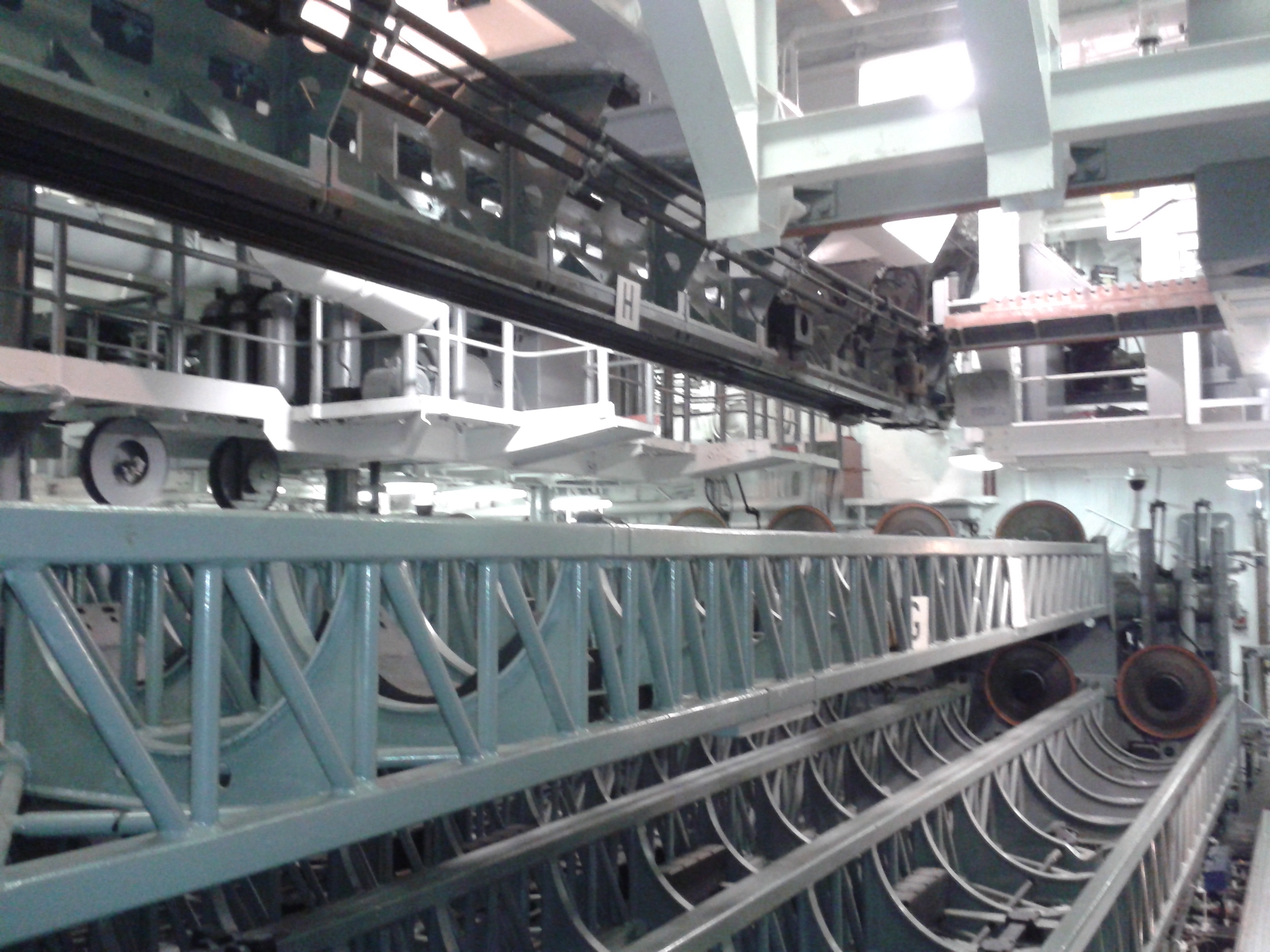
RIM-8 Talos magazine racks in the ship

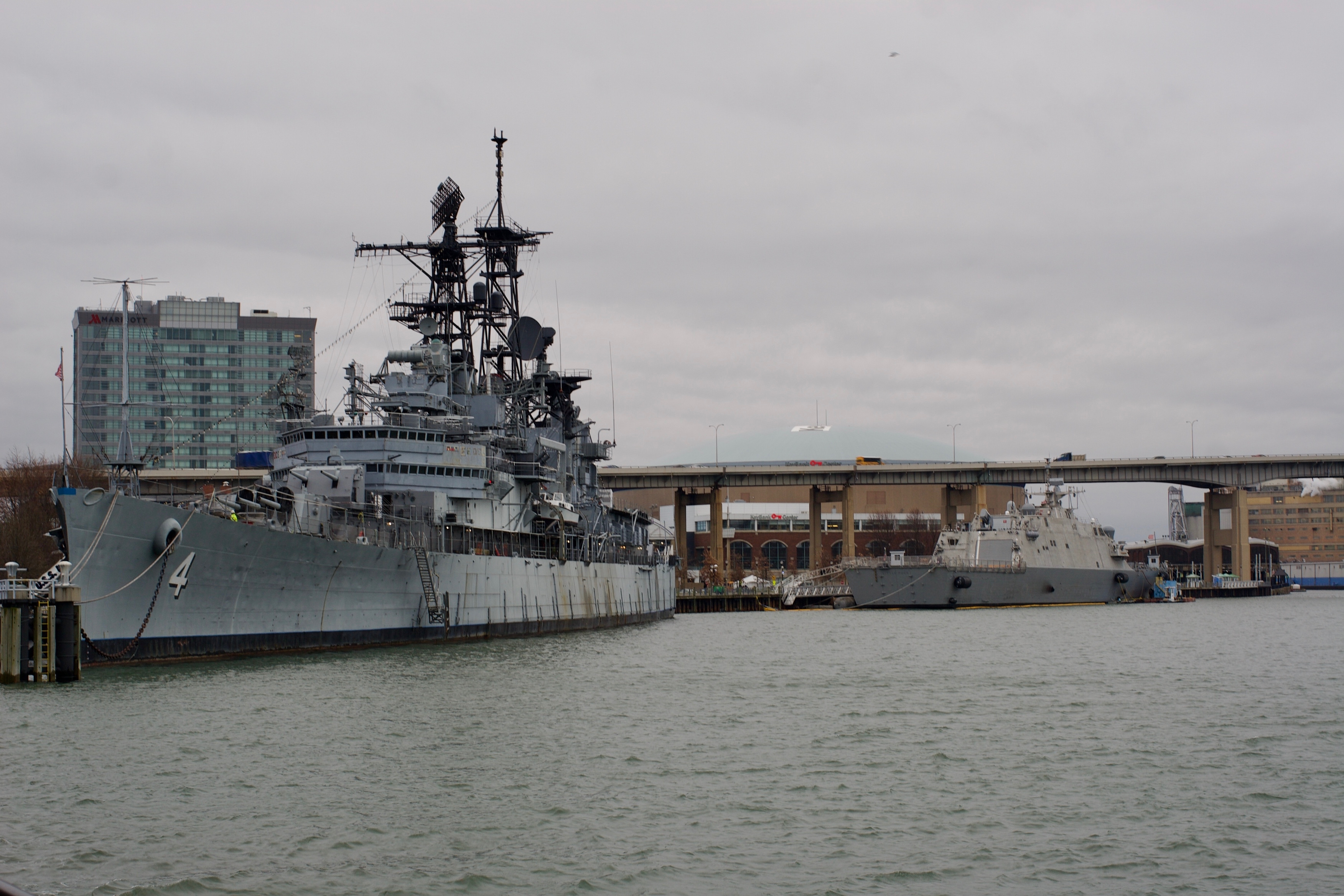
Little Rock alongside the littoral combat ship of the same name

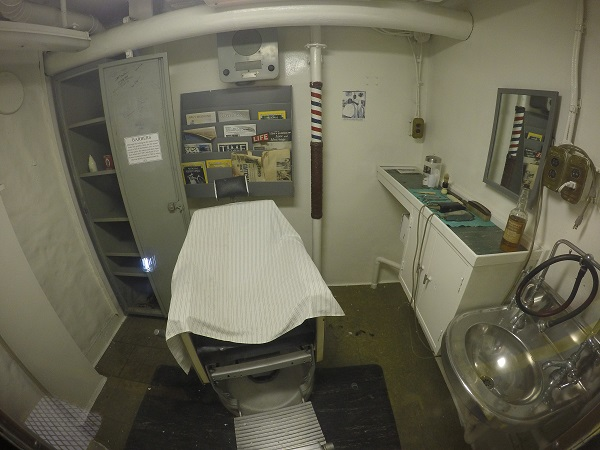
Little Rock officer's barber shop, November 2021

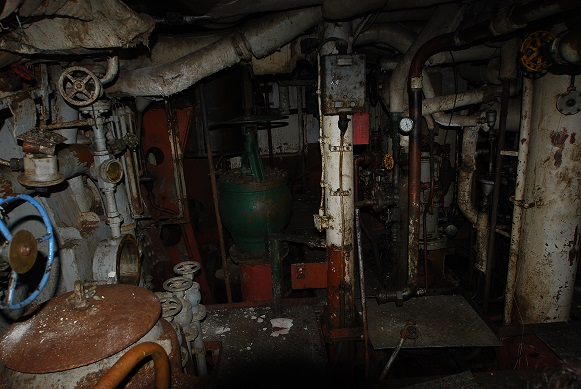
Lower engine room Little Rock, November 2021

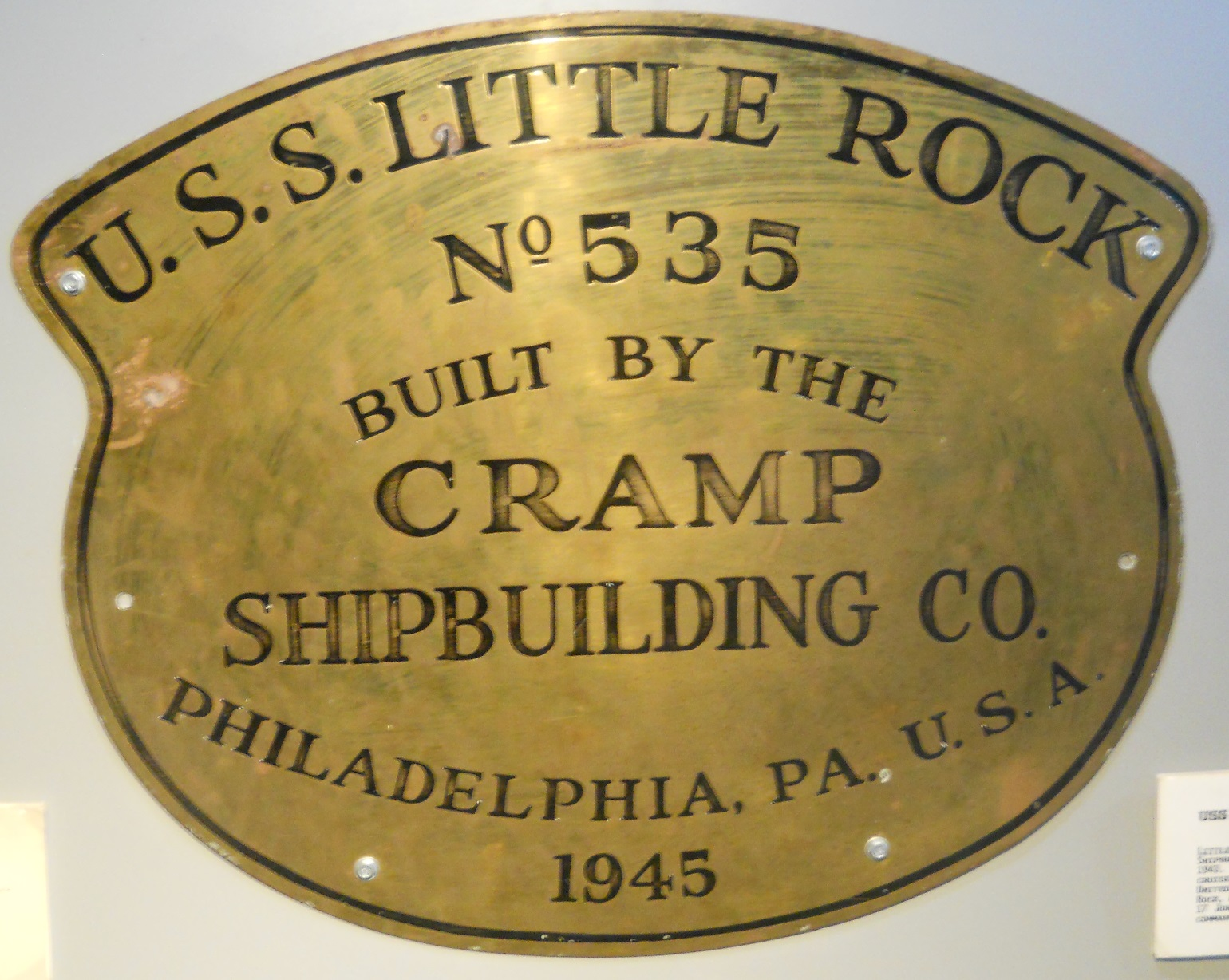
Photo of USS Little Rock CL-92 Cramp Shipbuilding Plaque.

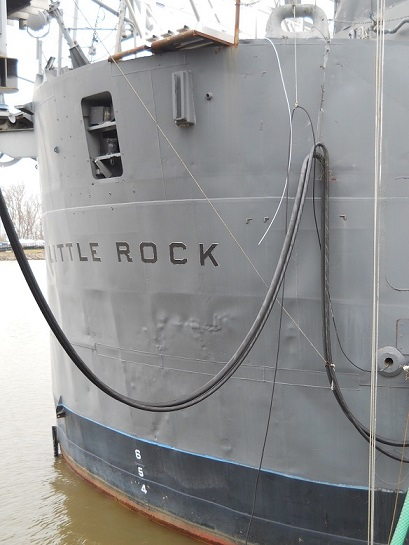
Stern of the USS Little Rock CG-4 on 6 March 2023. 80 years earlier her keel was laid down in ceremony on Saturday 6 March 1943.

== Bibliography ==
- Doa, Tom (1996). "Question 25/93: USN/USCG Collisions with Merchant Vessels". Warship International. XXXIII (3): 319. ISSN 0043-0374.
