= USS Caprice (SP-703) =

Patrol vessel of the United States Navy

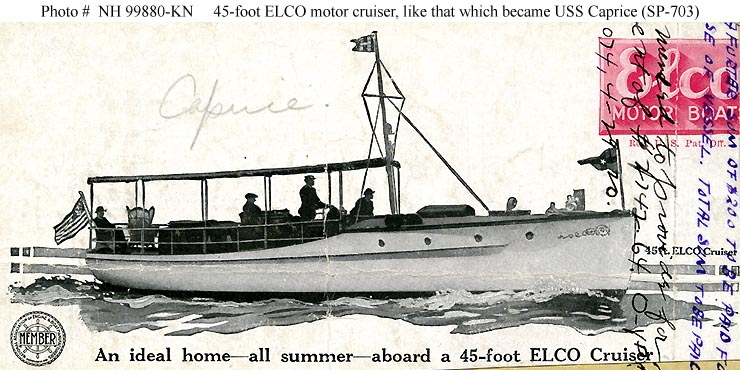
- A 45-foot (14-meter) Electric Launch Company (ELCO) "motor cruiser" depicted in a halftone reproduction, published with an ELCO advertisement in a pre-World War I boating publication. USS Caprice (SP-703) was built as a private motorboat to this design.

History

United States
- Name: USS Caprice
- Namesake: Previous name retained
- Builder: Electric Launch Company (ELCO), Bayonne, New Jersey
- Completed: 1914
- Acquired: May 1917
- Commissioned: 24 August 1917
- Decommissioned: 24 January 1919
- Fate: Returned to owner 24 January 1919
- Notes: Operated as private motorboat Caprice 1914–1917 and from 1919

General characteristics
- Type: Patrol vessel
- Length: 45 ft 10 in (13.97 m)
- Draft: 5 ft (1.5 m)
- Speed: 9 knots
- Complement: 9
- Armament: 1 × 1-pounder gun

The first USS Caprice (SP-703) was a United States Navy patrol vessel in commission from 1917 to 1919.

Caprice was built in 1914 as a private motorboat of the same name by the Electric Launch Company (ELCO) at Bayonne, New Jersey. In May 1917, the U.S. Navy acquired her under a free lease from her owner, William Sloan of Norfolk, Virginia, for use as a section patrol boat during World War I. She was commissioned as USS Caprice (SP-703) on 24 August 1917.

Assigned to the 5th Naval District, Caprice carried out patrol duties for the rest of World War I.

Caprice was decommissioned on 24 January 1919 and returned to Sloan the same day.
