= Emily Stone (writer) =

Emily Stone (born 1989) is a Welsh author of romance fiction. She lives in Chepstow.

== Career ==
Stone, who uses a pen name, is known for her novels Always, in December (2021) and One Last Gift (2022). Always, in December was inspired by the death of Stone's mother when Stone was seven years old.

Both novels received starred reviews from Publishers Weekly. It reviewed Always, in December positively, noting, "Romance fans should be prepared for a tearjerker ending to this poignant, well-plotted tale of once-in-a-life-time love. It’s as unforgettable as it is heart-wrenching". USA Today called Always, in December "[t]ruly an unforgettable and heart-tugging novel" and named it a best romantic comedy book of 2021.

== Works ==
- Always, in December. Dell. 2021. ISBN 978-0-593-49687-9. Audiobook read by Heather Long.
- One Last Gift. Dell. 2022. ISBN 978-0-593-59834-4. Audiobook read by Heather Long.
- Love, Holly. Headline Review, expected 2023. ISBN 9781035400010.
