= USS Boston (SSN-703) =

Los Angeles-class nuclear-powered attack submarine of the US Navy

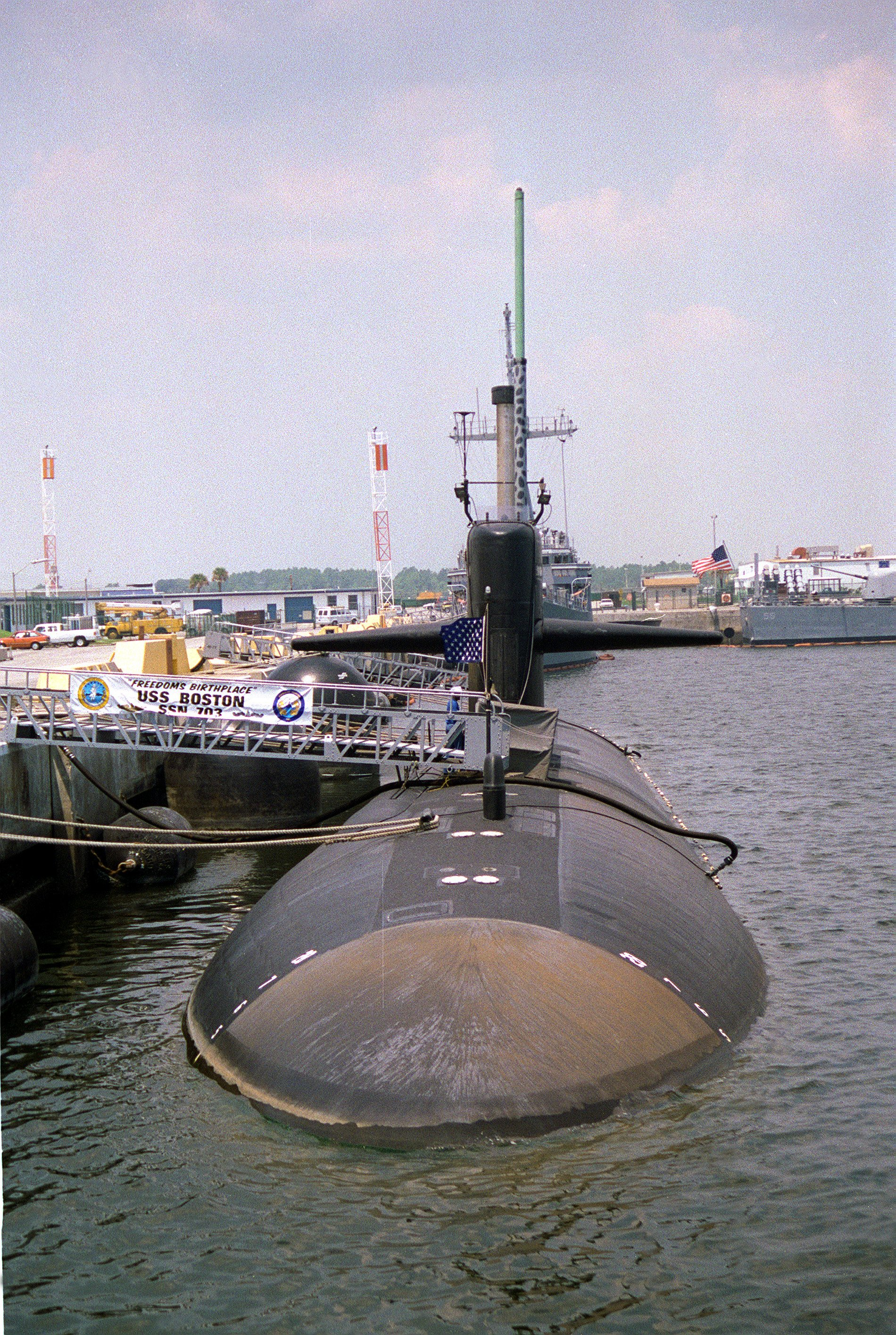
- USS Boston (SSN-703)

History

United States
- Name: USS Boston
- Namesake: Boston, Massachusetts
- Awarded: 10 December 1973
- Builder: General Dynamics Corporation
- Laid down: 11 August 1978
- Launched: 19 April 1980
- Commissioned: 30 January 1982
- Decommissioned: 19 November 1999
- Stricken: 19 November 1999
- Motto: Freedom's Birthplace
- Fate: Scrapped with only the sail on display at Buffalo and Erie County Naval & Military Park
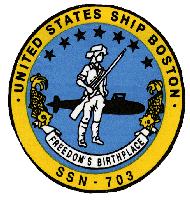
- Badge

General characteristics
- Class & type: Los Angeles-class submarine
- Displacement: 5,779 tons light, 6,150 tons full, 371 tons dead
- Length: 110.3 m (361 ft 11 in)
- Beam: 10 m (32 ft 10 in)
- Draft: 9.7 m (31 ft 10 in)
- Propulsion: S6G nuclear reactor
- Complement: 12 officers, 98 men
- Armament: 4 × 21 in (533 mm) torpedo tubes; MK.48 ADCAP torpedoes; Tomahawk Land Attack cruise missile (TLAM); MK60 mines; MK67 SLMM mines

USS Boston (SSN-703), a Los Angeles-class submarine, was the seventh ship of the United States Navy to be named for Boston, Massachusetts.

== History ==
The contract to build Boston was awarded to the Electric Boat Division of General Dynamics Corporation in Groton, Connecticut on 10 December 1973 and her keel was laid down on 11 August 1978. She was launched on 19 April 1980 sponsored by Mrs. Karen Dane Hidalgo (née Jernstedt), wife of the Secretary of the Navy Edward Hidalgo, and commissioned on 30 January 1982, with Captain Jon M. Barr in command.

In 1998 Boston participated in a UNITAS South America deployment.

== Decommissioning ==
Due to cutbacks in the Defense Budget; Boston, like many of her early Los Angeles-class sisters was not given her mid-life nuclear refueling, and was decommissioned and stricken on 19 November 1999 from the Naval Vessel Register. Ex-Boston entered the Nuclear Powered Ship and Submarine Recycling Program in Bremerton, Washington, on 1 October 2001 and on 19 September 2002 ceased to exist. Her sail and upper rudder were preserved for display at the Buffalo and Erie County Naval & Military Park in Buffalo, New York.

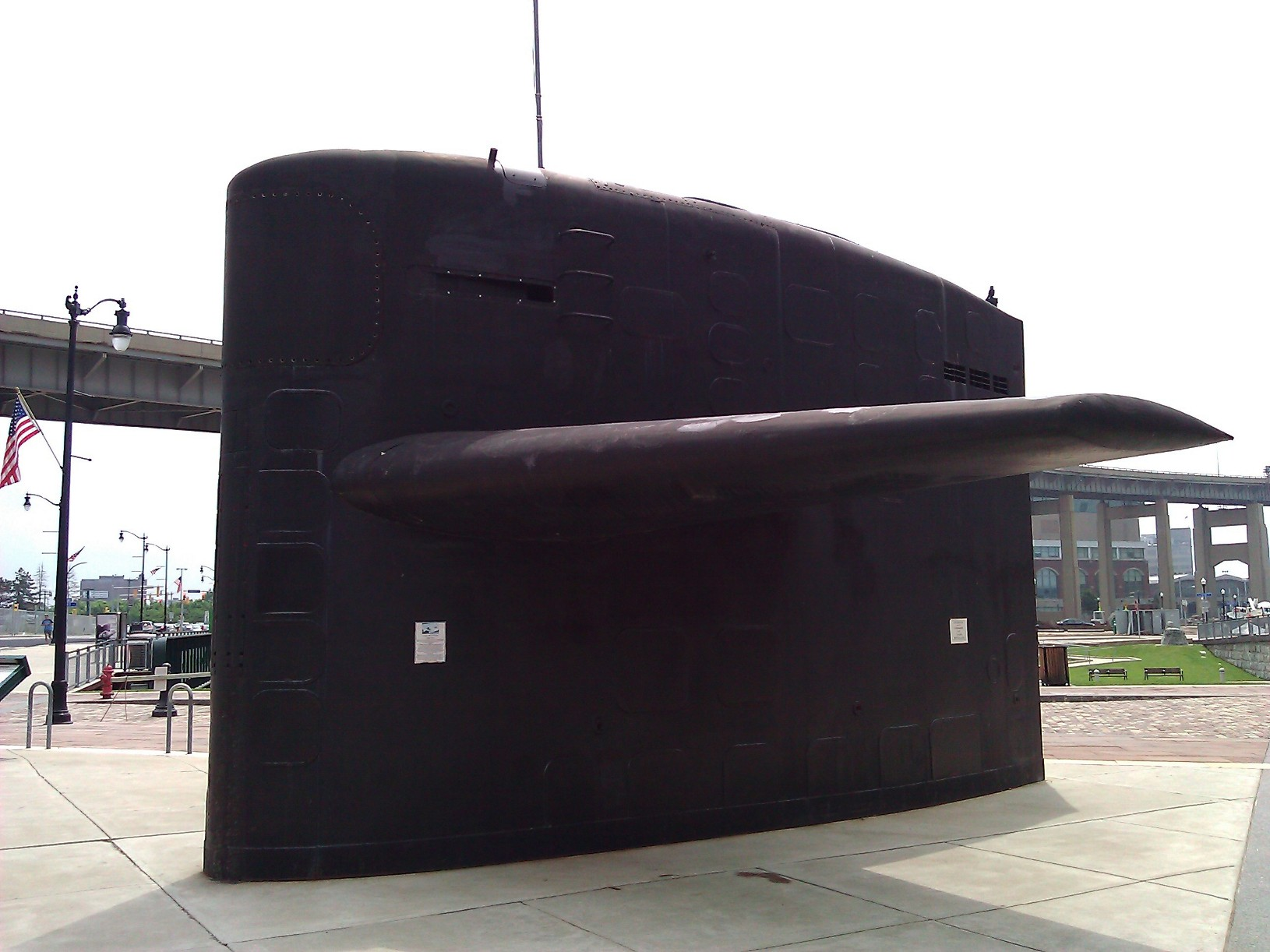
The sub sail of USS Boston at the Buffalo and Erie County Naval & Military Park

== Awards ==
Boston was a much-decorated ship. The crew distinguished themselves on numerous occasions by meritorious service and outstanding performance. Awards included the Arleigh Burke Fleet Trophy and the Marjorie Sterrett Battleship Fund Award, both of which are presented to one ship in the Pacific and one ship in the Atlantic. Her other awards included:

- 1983: CINCLANTFLT Golden Anchor Award, Red "E" for Engineering Excellence, Meritorious Unit Commendation
- 1984: Battle Efficiency "E" Ribbon, Arleigh Burke Award Nominee for Greatest Improvements in Battle Efficiency, Meritorious Unit Commendation
- 1985: Battle Efficiency "E" Ribbon, Red "E" for Engineering Excellence, Green "C" for Communication Excellence, Silver Anchor Award, Meritorious Unit Commendation
- 1986: Green "C" for Communication Excellence, Red "E" for Engineering Excellence,
- 1987: Yellow "M" for Medical Excellence, CINCLANFLT Silver Anchor Award, CINCLANFLT Golden Anchor Award Runner-up
- 1988: CINCLANFLT Silver Anchor Award
- 1989: CINLANFLT Silver Anchor Award
- 1990: Green "C" for Communication Excellence
- 1991: Supply Blue "E" for Supply Excellence, Meritorious Unit Commendation
- 1993: White Tactical "T" for Tactical Efficiency
- 1995: Battle Efficiency "E" Ribbon, Meritorious Unit Commendation, Arleigh Burke Award for Greatest Improvements in Battle Efficiency
- 1996: Battle Efficiency "E" Ribbon, Meritorious Unit Commendation, Marjorie Sterrett Battleship Fund Award for Most Battle-Ready Ship in Atlantic Fleet
- 1997: Joint Meritorious Unit Commendation, Red "DC" for Damage Control Excellence
- 1998: Red and Green "N" for Navigation Excellence

== In popular culture ==
- Boston appears in the 1986 Tom Clancy novel Red Storm Rising, along with sister submarines Providence and Chicago.
