= E (underground car) =

Soviet electric multiple unit

Type E
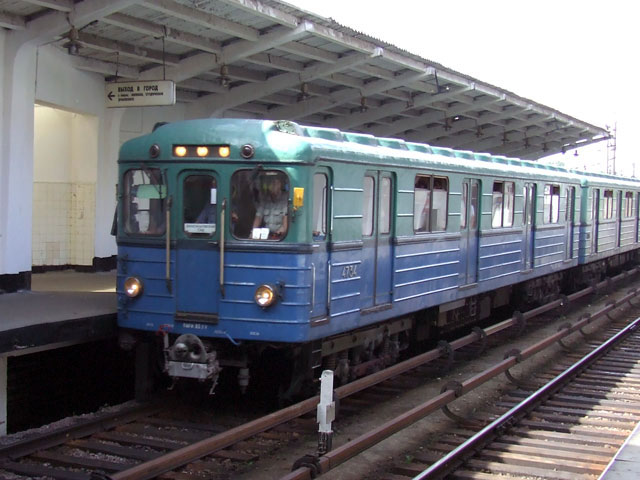
- Type E car No. 4734 at Studencheskaya (Moscow Metro)

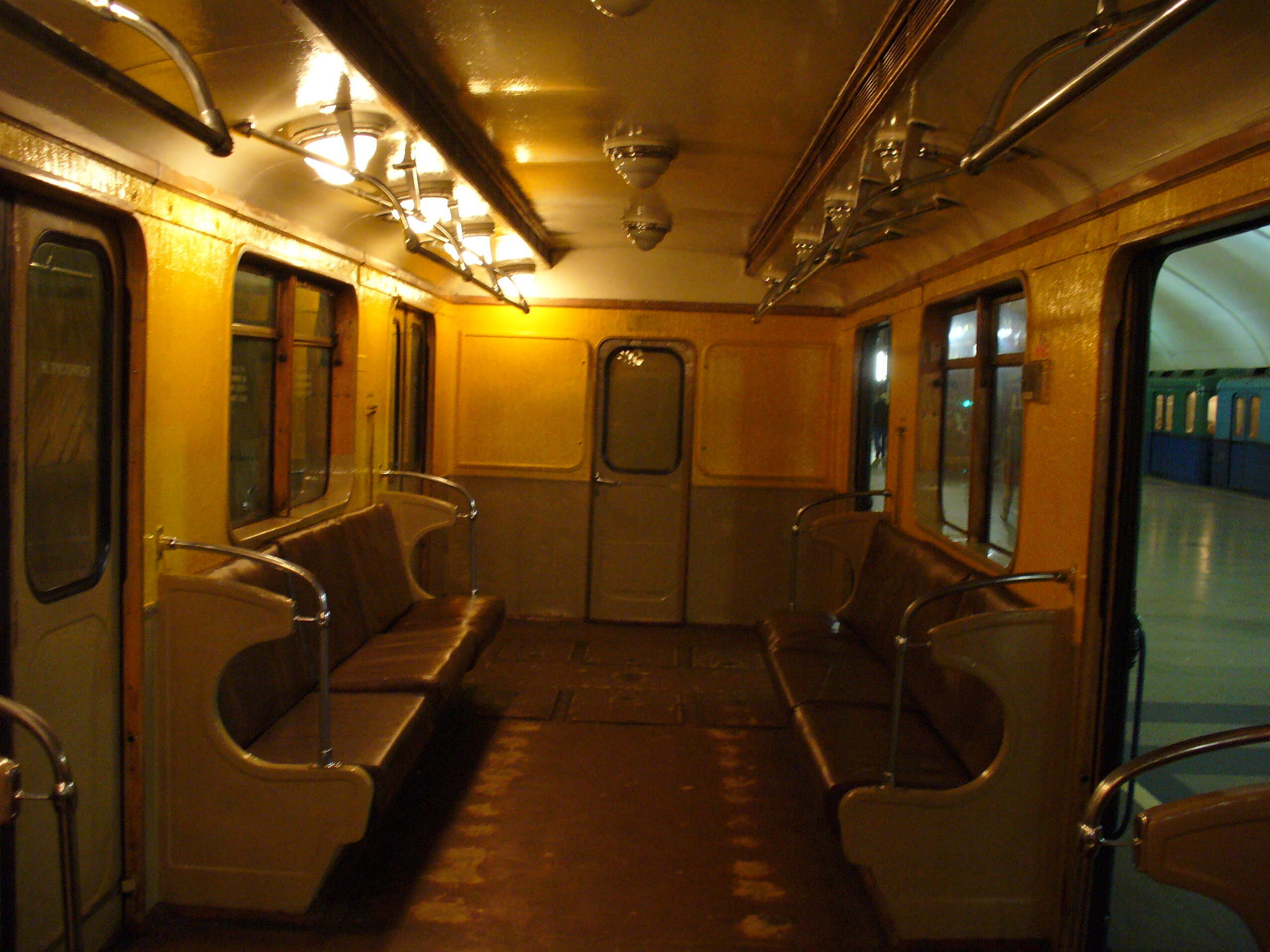
- Manufacturer: Metrowagonmash
- Assembly: Mytishchi, Russian SSR
- Constructed: 1959 experimental, 1963–1969 serial
- Entered service: 1963
- Number built: 824
- Predecessor: D
- Successor: Em
- Capacity: 260
- Operators: Moscow Metro; Saint Petersburg Metro; Kiev Metro; Tbilisi Metro; Baku Metro

Specifications
- Car length: 19,166 mm
- Width: 2,700 mm
- Maximum speed: 90 km/h (56 mph)
- Weight: 31.5 tonnes (69,000 lb)
- Engine type: DK-108
- Power output: 4 x 58-66 kW
- Acceleration: 1.2 m/s^{2}
- Deceleration: 1.1 m/s^{2}
- Electric system: 750 V DC third rail
- Current collection: contact shoe
- Seating: 40
- Track gauge: 1,520 mm (4 ft 11 27/32 in)

Type E is a Soviet electric multiple unit designed for rapid transit systems in the Soviet Union and Eastern Bloc countries. The trains were built by Metrovagonmash in Moscow. The first experimental railcars of the E type were built in 1959, and serial production began in 1963. All traincars of the series were motor coaches.

== Development ==
The Type E project was developed in 1957 by Metrowagonmash together with the Dynamo Engine Plant and the Moscow Brake Plant. Its goal was improved speed and acceleration over its predecessor, the Metrowagonmash D. It was achieved thanks to a thinner corrugated body and new lighter bogies which helped decrease a car's weight to 31.5 t (69,000 lb) from Type D's 36.2 t (80,000 lb), as well as new traction motors which served to improve top speed to 90 km/h (56 mph) from D's 75 km/h (47 mph) and acceleration to 1.2 m/s^{2} from D's 1 m/s^{2}. In addition, the new train's doorways were wider than Type D's.

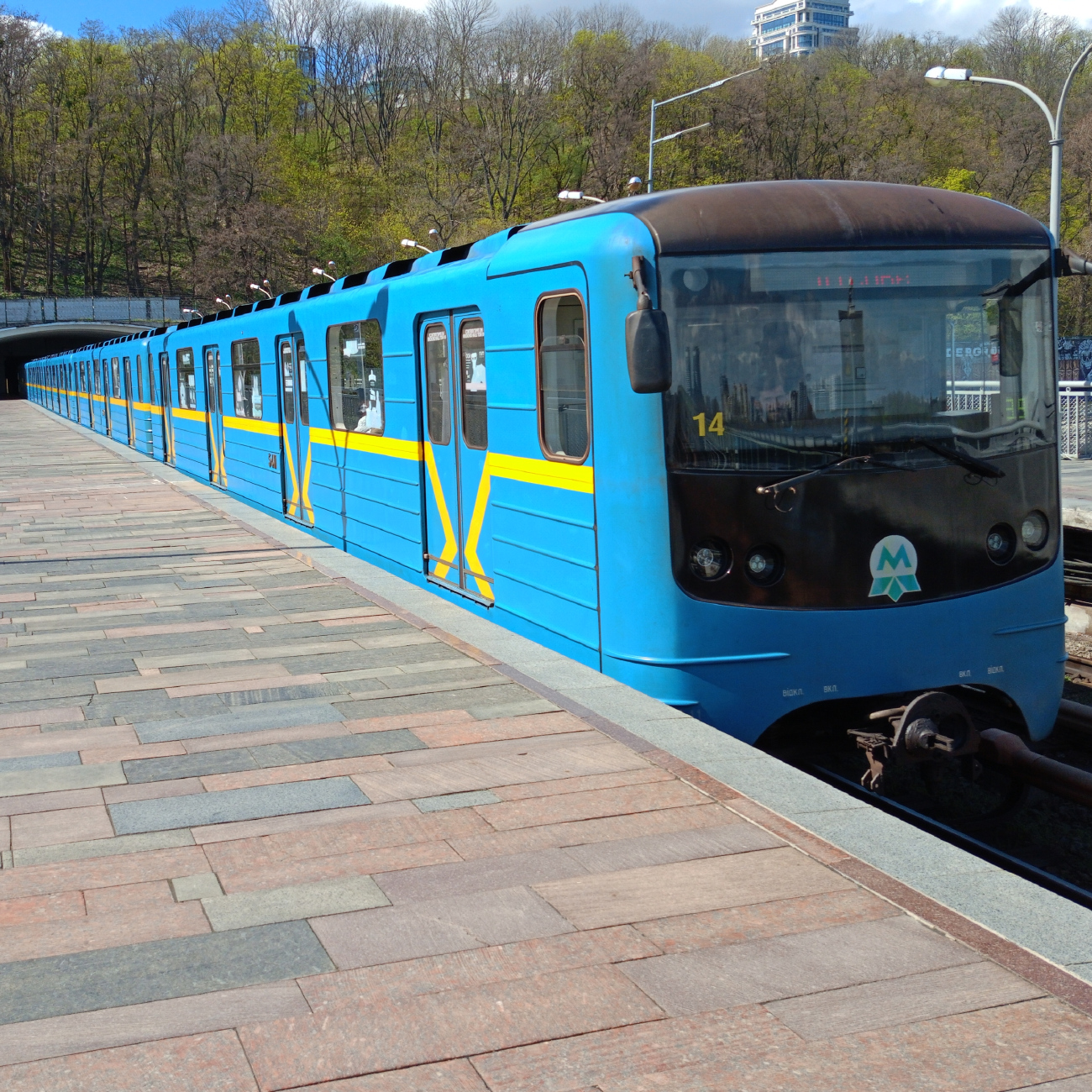
Type E-KM car No. 5411 at Dnipro (Kiev Metro)

The type received the code 81-703. Its first two experimental traincars were built in November 1959 by Metrowagonmash. By November 1960, the first tests were deemed successful and five more cars were built. In June 1963 Type E entered serial production, replacing Type D.

== Operation ==
As the type entered regular operation, several flaws of the new trains were detected, and in May 1965, all Type E trains had to be pulled from service for modernization. Several modifications were implemented during the type's production run: the bogies had to be strengthened, which increased a car's weight to 32 tons. Some of the electrical equipment was overhauled, including the traction motors, the electromagnetic brakes, the train driver's controller and the compressor. Since 1969, some of the trains were retrofitted with equipment for the ALS-ARS automatic train control system.

Type E trains could not be used on the blue Line 2 and green Line 3 of the Leningrad Metro because their door placement was asymmetrical and not compartible with platform screen doors used on some of their stations. That made Metrowagonmash develop a modified version of the type that kept the same bogies and electrical equipment as Type E but had an altered passenger cabin with symmetrical door alignment and the PMSAUP automatic train control system installed to assist the driver in aligning the train with the station doors. Three car variants were developed: Ema (control car, has PMSAUP equipment installed), Emx (rear car, only has the switch to enable or disable the system) and Em (intermediate car). Em received the code 81-704, Ema 81-705, Emx 81-706. The first experimental train of the type was built by Metrowagonmash in December 1966. In November 1967, the type entered service on Line 3 of the Leningrad Metro. In April 1968, Vagonmash in Leningrad started its own production.

== Operation history ==
Type E cars were manufactured until 1969 and operated in metro systems of Moscow, Saint-Petersburg, Kiev, Tbilisi and Baku. In Tbilisi and Baku they were retired by 1996.

In Moscow they operated until 2008.

In Saint-Petersburg they were retired from service between 2013 and 2015. Multiple cars were converted to service cars, several were preserved for the Saint Petersburg Metro Museum's retro train.

In Kiev, a number of E trains have been overhauled by the Kryukov Railway Car Building Works since 2014. This modification replaces the DC motors of the traincars with more modern and energy efficient AC induction motors. It was named E-KM and its control cars received the code 81-7080 while intermediate cars received the code 81–7081.
