= NGC 703 =

Galaxy in the constellation Andromeda

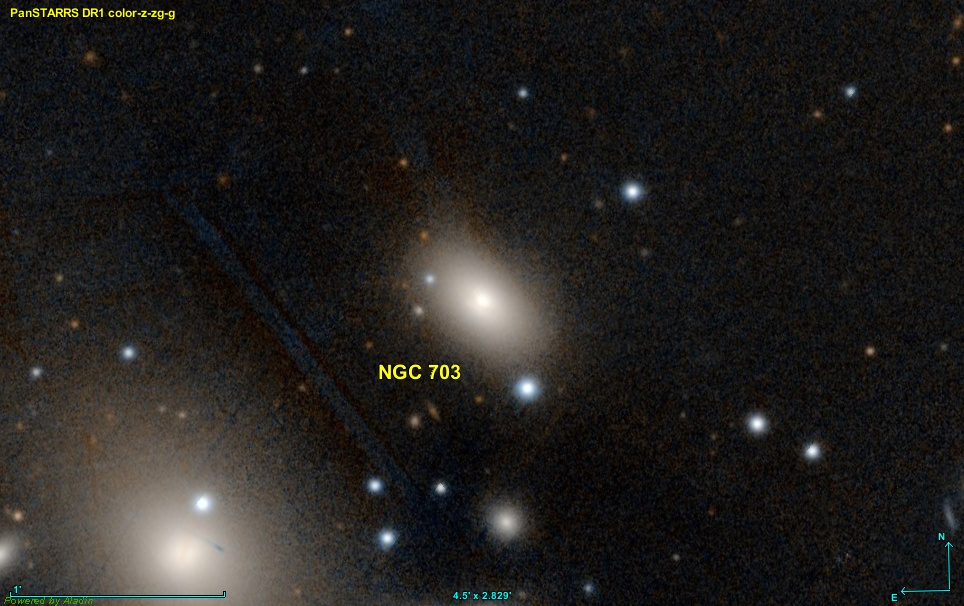
- Pan-STARRS image of NGC 703

Observation data (J2000 epoch)
- Constellation: Andromeda
- Right ascension: 01^{h} 52^{m} 39.6^{s}
- Declination: 36° 10′ 17″
- Redshift: 0.018613
- Heliocentric radial velocity: 5580 km/s
- Distance: 240 Mly (73 Mpc)
- Group or cluster: Abell 262
- Apparent magnitude (V): 14.27

Characteristics
- Type: S0^-
- Size: ~82,000 ly (25 kpc) (estimated)
- Apparent size (V): 1.2 x 0.9

Other designations
- CGCG 522-37, MCG 6-5-29, PGC 6957, UGC 1346

NGC 703 is a lenticular galaxy located 240 million light-years away in the constellation Andromeda. The galaxy was discovered by astronomer William Herschel on September 21, 1786 and is also a member of Abell 262.

NGC 703 is classified as a radio galaxy.

== See also ==
- List of NGC objects (1–1000)
