= Em (underground car) =

Soviet electric multiple unit

Type Em, Ema, Emx
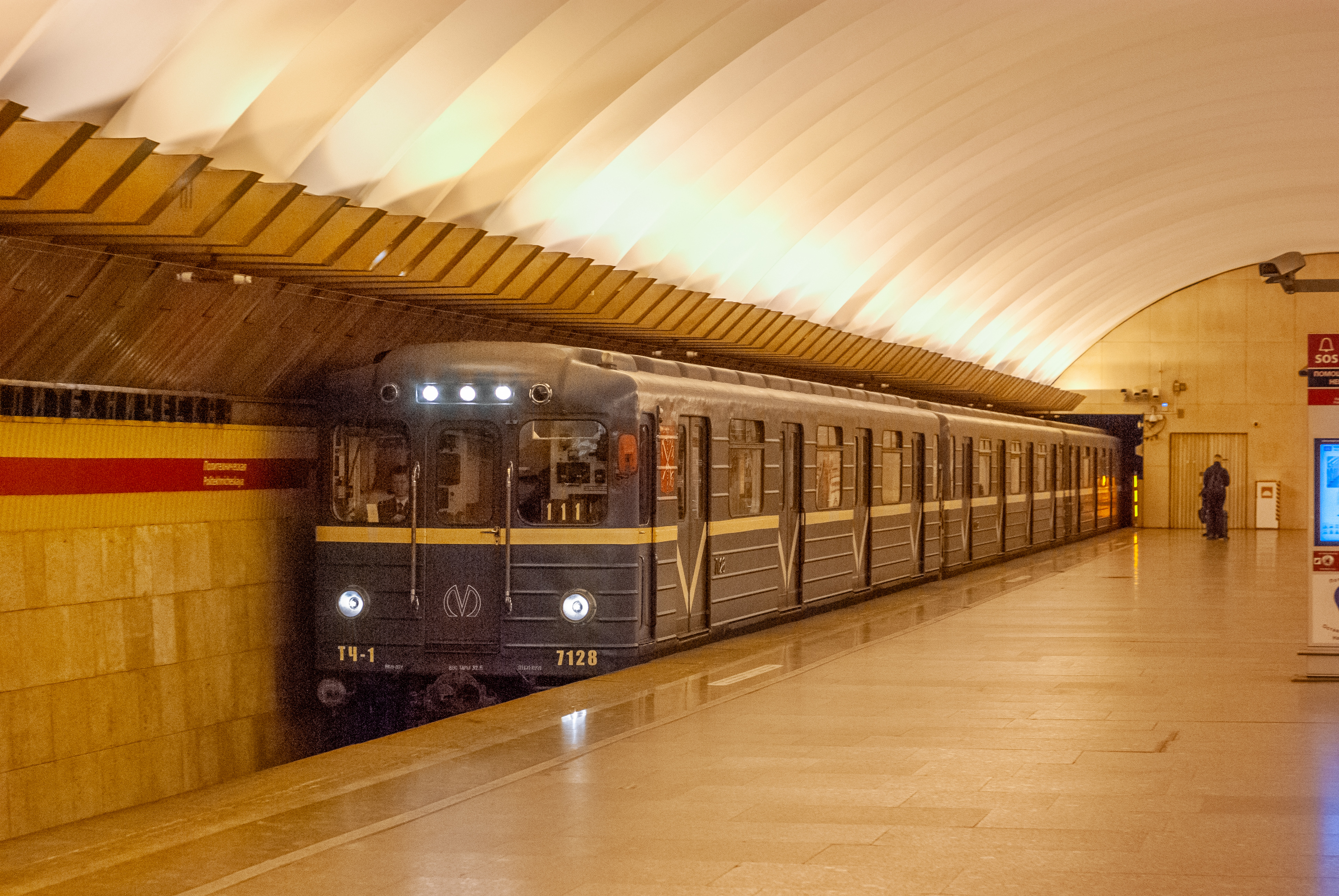
- Type Ema-502 car No. 7128 at Politekhnicheskaya (Saint Petersburg Metro)

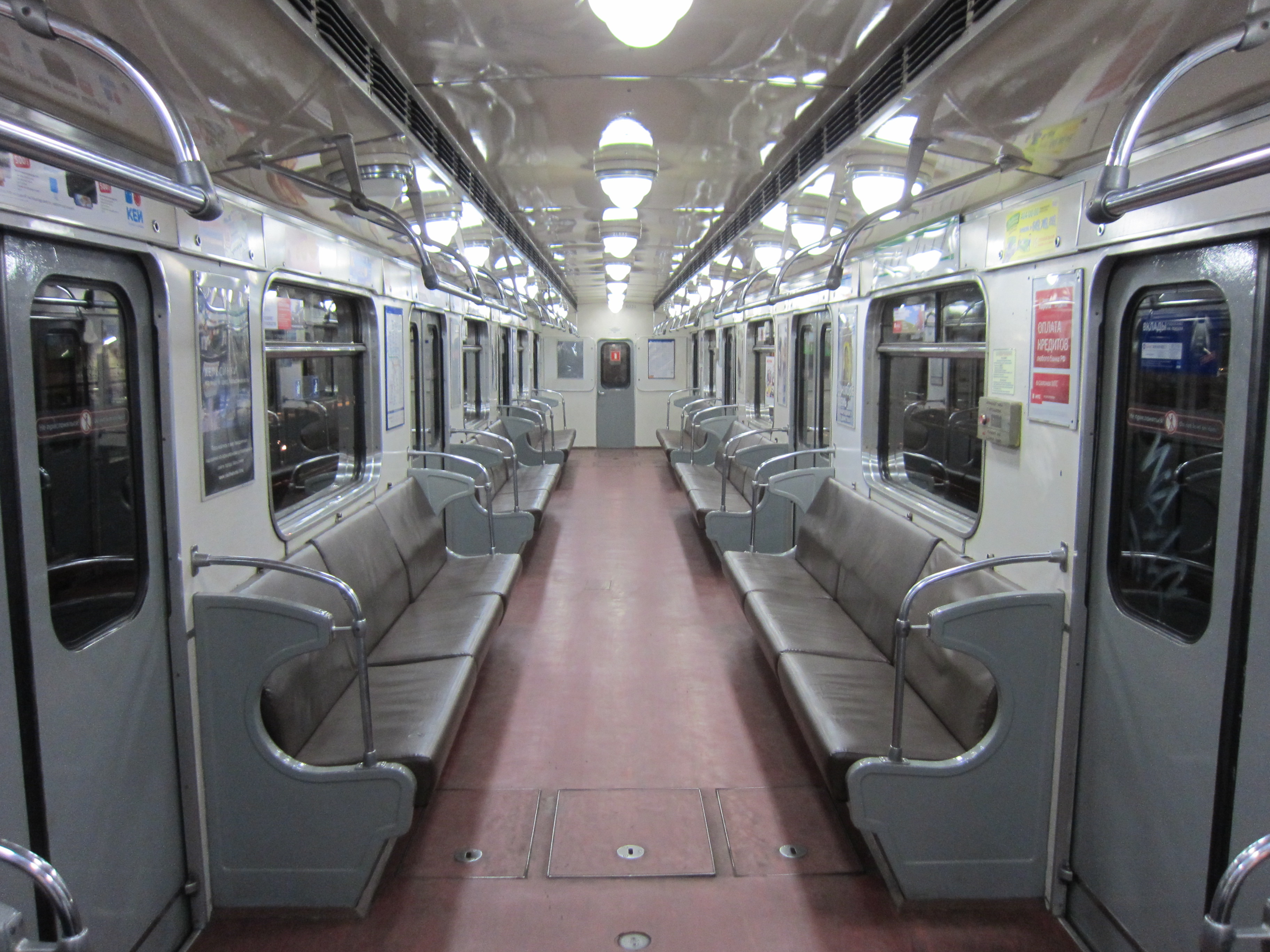
- Second-generation interior
- Manufacturers: Metrowagonmash; Vagonmash
- Assembly: Mytishchi, Russian SSR; Leningrad, Russian SSR
- Constructed: 1966–1980
- Entered service: 1967
- Number built: 747
- Predecessor: E
- Successor: 81-717/714
- Capacity: 264
- Operators: Saint Petersburg Metro; Moscow Metro; Kiev Metro; Tbilisi Metro; Baku Metro

Specifications
- Car length: 19,210 mm
- Width: 2,700 mm
- Maximum speed: 90 km/h (56 mph)
- Weight: 32.2 tonnes (71,000 lb)
- Engine type: DK-108; DK-116 (Em-508T)
- Power output: 4 x 58-66 kW
- Acceleration: 1.2 m/s^{2}
- Deceleration: 1.1 m/s^{2}
- Electric system: 750 V DC third rail
- Current collection: contact shoe
- Seating: 42
- Track gauge: 1,520 mm (4 ft 11 27/32 in)

Type Em is a Soviet electric multiple unit designed for rapid transit systems in the Soviet Union and Eastern Bloc countries. They were built by Metrovagonmash in Moscow and Vagonmash in Leningrad. The first experimental railcars of the Em type were built in 1966, and serial production began in 1967. All traincars of the series were motor coaches.

== Development and operation ==
The Type E underground car was developed by Metrowagonmash in 1957 and entered serial production in June 1963. Type E received the code 81-703. It achieved improved speed and acceleration over its predecessor, the Metrowagonmash D.

However, Type E trains could not be used on the Blue Line (Line 2) and Green Line (Line 3) of the Leningrad Metro because their door placement was asymmetrical and not compatible with platform screen doors used on some of those lines' stations. That required Metrowagonmash to develop the Em variants, modified versions of the type that kept the same bogies and electrical equipment as Type E but had an altered passenger cabin with symmetrical door alignment and the PMSAUP automatic train control system installed to assist the driver in aligning the train with the station doors.

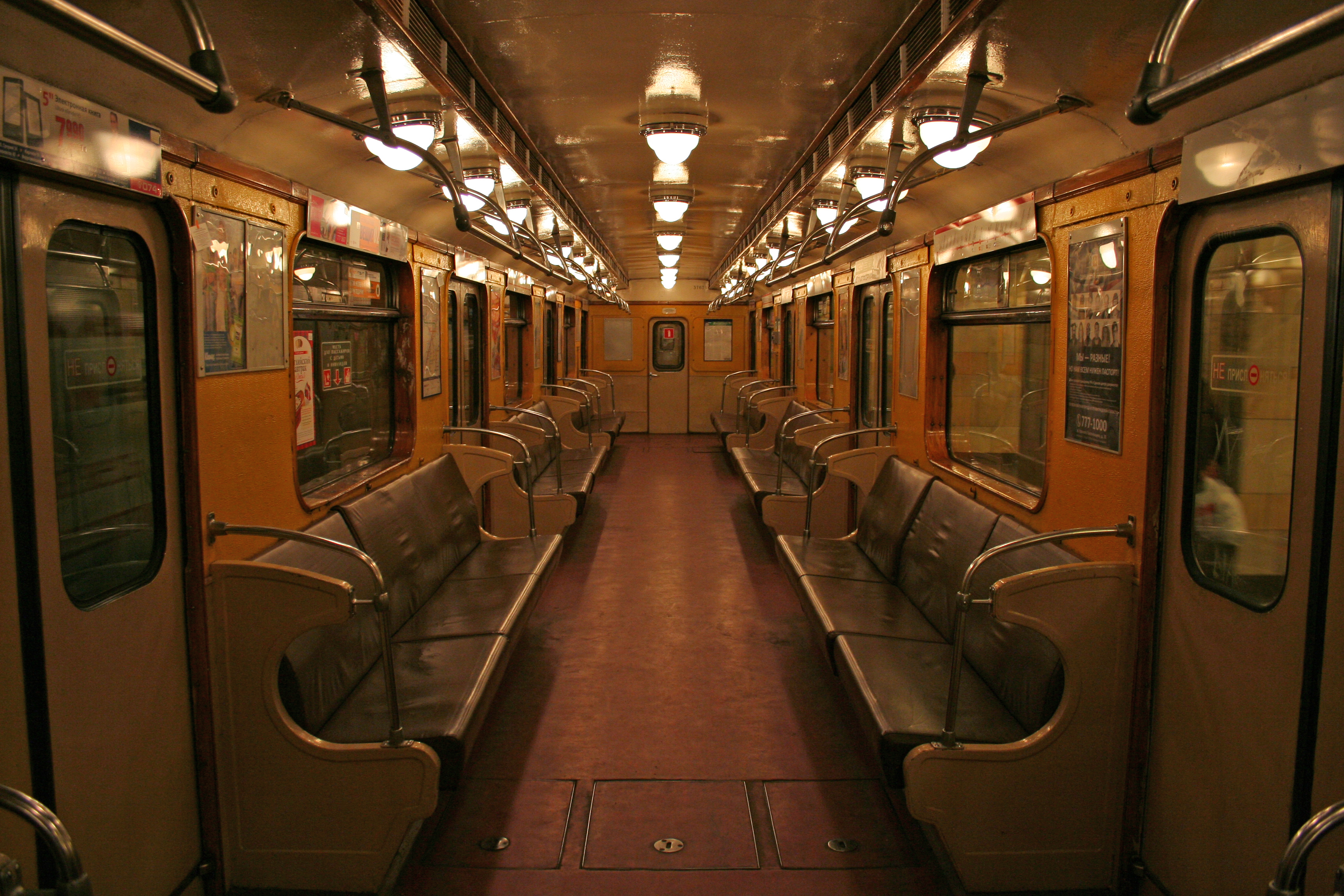
First-generation interior

Three car variants were developed: Ema (control car, has PMSAUP equipment installed), Emx (rear car, only has the switch to enable or disable the system) and Em (intermediate car). Em received the code 81-704, Ema 81-705, Emx 81-706. The first experimental train of the type was built by Metrowagonmash in December 1966. In November 1967, the type entered service on Line 3 of the Leningrad Metro. In April 1968, Vagonmash in Leningrad started its own production.

In November 1969, Vagonmash developed a modified version of the traincars. The new intermediate cars received the index 81-501 and are referred to as Em-501, likewise the control cars are 81-502 (Ema-502) and the rear cars are 81-503 (Emx-503). At that time, the previously used lincrusta interior paneling no longer met fire safety regulations, so it was replaced with plastic.

In December 1973, two Ema cars first received equipment for the ALS-ARS automatic train control system. Since 1975, it was installed on all Ema-502 and Em-501 cars.

Emx-503 cars were manufactured until 1973, after that the trains had one Ema-502 car in the front and one in the rear.

In 1970, Vagonmash started production of a modified version of the type for the Moscow Metro, with bogies, pneumatic and electrical equipment, including traction motors, from the Ezh class. Control cars were labeled Em-509 and numbered 81-509, intermediate cars were Em-508 and 81-508. In 1974, Vagonmash introduced another modification for the Moscow Metro. It was called Em-508T, numbered 81-508T, and used equipment from the Ezh3 class. Em-508 and Em-509 cars were compartible with E and Ezh cars and could be used in the same trains, while prior modifications could only be used with other Em cars.

== Operation history and current status ==
Em cars were delivered to the metro systems of Saint Petersburg, Moscow, Kiev, Tbilisi and Baku.

In the Moscow Metro, the last Em-508T cars were withdrawn from regular passenger service in 2020.

In the Saint Petersburg Metro, Em cars with lincrusta paneling were retired in 2020, while the last Em-501 and Ema-502 trains were retired from passenger service in 2025, then used in the testing of the under-construction Saint Petersburg Metro Line 6. Multiple cars were converted to service and freight cars, several were preserved for the Saint Petersburg Metro Museum's retro train.

In the Kyiv Metro, Ema-502 cars are still in service as of 2026.
