= Em Stone =

American comic book illustrator (born 1978)

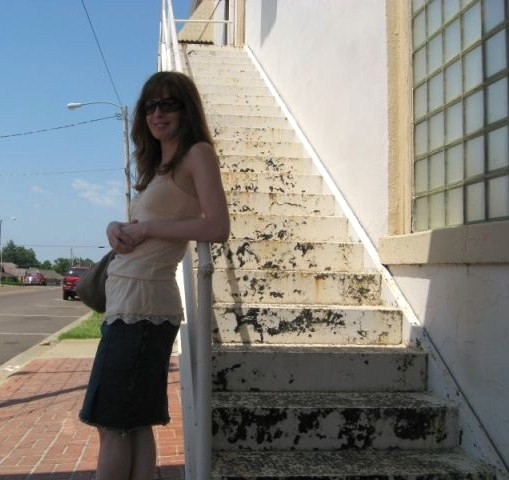
- Emily Stone in Holly Springs, MS
- Born: Emily J. Stone; July 22, 1978 (age 48) Potts Camp, MS
- Area: Artist
- Notable works: HACK/Slash

Emily J. Stone (born July 22, 1978) is an American comic book illustrator most known for artwork on Devil’s Due Publishing's HACK/Slash series.

== Early life ==
Born and raised in Potts Camp, Mississippi, Emily's introduction to the sequential narrative was through Spider-Man comics featured in Electric Company Magazine. She received a Master's Degree in Fine Arts from the sequential art program at Savannah College of Art and Design. She had received her Bachelor's degree from Mississippi State University in Computer Science.

Thomas Mitchell "Coach" Stone, a former basketball coach from Potts Camp, Mississippi, who miraculously guided his small-town, rural team to the overall State Championship in 1961, is Stone's grandfather.

== Career ==
Although most well known for her artwork on the story of Cassie Hack and her partner Vlad in Devil’s Due Publishing's HACK/Slash series, Stone's career in illustration has included a variety of other projects. This includes inking, penciling, or coloring The Ride (published by Image Comics), Jim Henson's comic Return to Labyrinth, and G.I. Joe comics/merchandise. She was also involved in the artwork for 160-page original graphic novel anthology, Lloyd Kaufman Presents the Toxic Avenger and Other Tromatic Tales.

Through HACK/Slash storylines, Stone has drawn numerous pop-culture characters including Reanimator's Herbert West, the Suicide Girls, Milk & Cheese among others. In addition, Stone has also illustrated a cover for Chucky from the Child's Play miniseries and artwork for Batgirl.

=== Work ===
2007-2008
As a penciler

- Hack/Slash (ongoing monthly series)

2006

- Pencils, inks and toning: The Ride: Savannah (chapter 3)

2006
As an inker

- G.I. Joe Sigma 6 issue 3 (Feb '06) interior art
- G.I. Joe Sigma 6 issue 5 (Apr '06) cover art
- Jim Henson's Return to Labyrinth, Vol. 1
