= Harry Brandon =

Harry Brandon may refer to:

- Harry "Skip" Brandon (born 1941), former deputy assistant director in charge of counter-terrorism and national security at the Federal Bureau of Investigation
- Harry Brandon (footballer) (1870–1935), Scottish footballer

== See also ==
- Henry Brandon (disambiguation)
