= PTF-26 =

Fast patrol boat built in 1968

Coordinates: 37.068917°N 88.655333°W

- PTF-26 at Sewart Seacraft in Berwick, Louisiana in 1968

History
- Owner: 1968 - 1971 United States Navy Vietnam; 1971 - 1990 US Navy: Naval Amphibious Base Coronado and Pacific Missile Test Center, Port Hueneme; 1997 to 2020 Liberty Maritime Inc. as Sea Scout training ship in Sacramento, California; 2020 - Current Maritime Preservation and Training Foundation, Ltd.
- Builder: Sewart Seacraft (now Swiftships) in Berwick, Louisiana
- Completed: 1968
- Commissioned: 1968
- Decommissioned: 1990
- In service: 1968–1990
- Nickname(s): The Last American PT Boat
- Status: Museum ship at Henderson, Kentucky
- Notes: 1. 95PB 684

General characteristics
- Class & type: Osprey-class fast patrol boat
- Displacement: 80 tons (105 tons full)
- Length: 94.5 ft (28.8 m)
- Beam: 24.5 ft (7.5 m)
- Draft: 6.8 ft (2.1 m)
- Installed power: 2 x 3,100 hp (2,300 kW) with Napier Deltic; 2 x 1,600 hp (1,200 kW) with Detroit Diesel
- Propulsion: 2 × 18-cylinder Napier Deltic engines; Now 2 × 16V71 diesel engine
- Speed: 40 to 51 knots (74 to 94 km/h; 46 to 59 mph)
- Complement: 19
- Armament: 1 x Oerlikon 20 mm cannon foredeck; 2 x .50-caliber Browning machine guns sides; 1 x 81 mm mortar foredeck; 1 x Bofors 40 mm gun rear

PTF-26 is a Osprey class PTF boat now serving as a youth training vessel and museum ship of the Maritime Preservation and Training Foundation, Ltd. PTF-26 is referred to as "The Last American PT Boat". PTF-26 was built in 1968 by the Sewart Seacraft now know as Swiftships in Berwick, Louisiana. PTF-26 is small river gunboat built with an aluminium hull. The United States Navy used PTF-26 in the Vietnam War from 1968 to 1971 in the Brown-water navy. PTF-26 has a top speed of speed of 40 knots (74 km/h; 46 mph) knots. She is an Osprey-class PTF boat and is 95 ft (29 m) long. PTF boats replaced the wooden World War II PT boats. Four new PTF boats were delivered to the Military Assistance Group (MACV) at Da Nang, Vietnam in 1968, PTF-26 was one of the four boats. The four boats were armed with a 40 mm Bofors cannon aft, two Oerlikon 20 mm cannon forward, two .50-caliber Browning machine guns and on the foredeck, an 81 mm mortar. From 1971 to 1990 she was used by the US Navy at Naval Amphibious Base Coronado and Pacific Missile Test Center, Port Hueneme From November 1997 to June 2020 she was with Liberty Maritime Inc. as a Sea Scout training ship at Sacramento, California. On her way to Maritime Pastoral Training Foundation she stopped at Morro Bay, California departing December 14, 2023, then on December 16, the Maritime Museum of San Diego, then the National Maritime Museum of the Gulf of Mexico and then Pickwick Lake of the Tennessee Valley Authority in July 2024. After a brief stay in Golconda, Illinois in 2024, PTF-26 headed south to Steiner Shipyard in Bayou La Batre, Alabama for a major overhaul and dry-docking in 2025. Following sea trials, PTF-26 is expected to relocate to Henderson, Kentucky to help train Navy Junior Reserve Officers' Training Corps Cadets, U.S. Naval Sea cadets and Sea Scouts.

== Osprey-class boats ==
The four Osprey-class aluminum hull PTF boats served in the Vietnam War starting in 1968, after being built at Sewart Seacraft (now Swiftships) in Berwick, Louisiana: PTF 26 is now a training and museum ship based in Henderson, Kentucky, still in PTF configuration.

== See also ==
- United States Nasty-class patrol boat built just before PTF 26
- List of museum ships in North America
- PTF 3
