= PTF boat =

Fast patrol boats used in Vietnam War

- US Navy PTF boat PTF-24 in 1973, an Osprey-class boat

Class overview
- Name: PTF (Patrol Torpedo, Fast)
- Builders: Båtbyggeri (14); John Trumpy & Sons (7); Sewart Seacraft (4); Bath Iron Works (1)
- Operators: US Navy; US Navy SEALS; US Marines; South Vietnam; CIA
- Preceded by: PT boat
- Succeeded by: Patrol Craft Fast
- Built: 1963–1970
- In service: 1963–1978
- Completed: 26
- Preserved: 5

General characteristics
- Type: Riverine patrol boat
- Length: 80 ft 4 in (24.49 m) (Nasty class); 94.5 ft (28.8 m) (Osprey class)
- Beam: 24 ft 7 in (7.49 m)
- Installed power: 6,200 bhp (4,623 kW)
- Propulsion: 2 × Napier Deltic Turboblown diesel engines
- Speed: 40 knots (74 km/h; 46 mph) (Mk I)
- Range: 912 nmi (1,689 km; 1,050 mi) at 20 kn (37 km/h; 23 mph)
- Complement: 12
- Armament: 2 × .50-caliber Browning machine guns; 1 × 81 mm mortar foredeck; 1 × Oerlikon 20 mm cannon foredeck; 1 × Bofors 40 mm gun rear

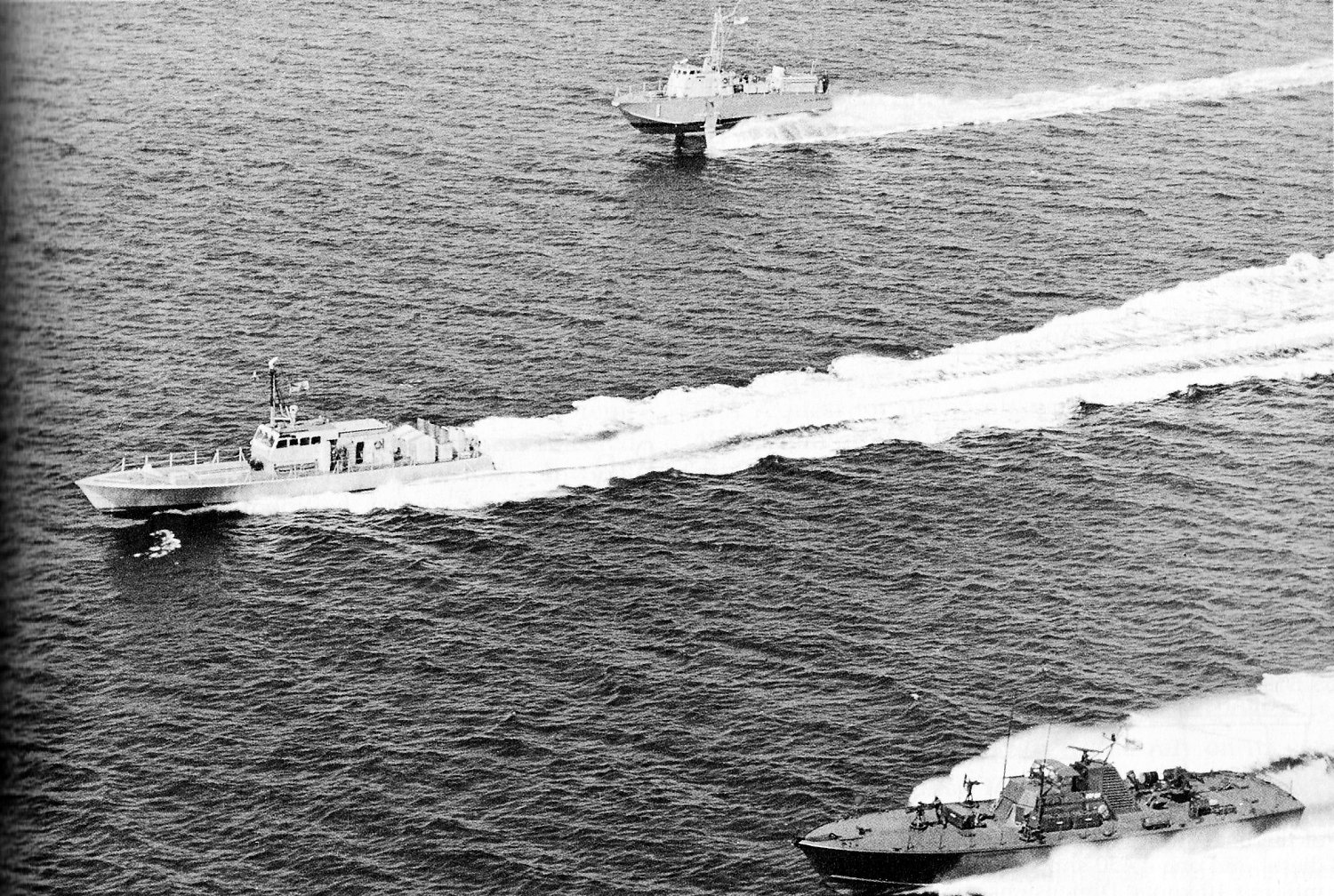
USS Flagstaff and PTF-23 in 1974

PTF (short for Patrol Torpedo, Fast) were fast patrol boats of the United States Navy introduced during the early years of the Vietnam War. The PTF designation was give to 26 boats with four different boat designs. The PTF boats were the Vietnam War "brown water" river boats version of the World War II PT boats. They were heavily armed gunboats that were used by the US Navy and by Special forces. The first two PTF boats were commissioned 21 December 1962. The last two PTF were commissioned on 8 April 1968. PFT boats were replaced by the new Patrol Craft Fast (PCF) boats that were more widely used in Vietnam. There are five PTF boats that have survived and are in various state of restoration. The "Torpedo Boat, Fast" designation is a hold over from World War II, as PTF boats were not equipped with torpedoes, as they were mostly used in shallow river waters.

== History ==
Following World War II the US Navy had little use for fast attack craft, so almost all of the PT boats were scrapped at the end of the war in 1945. PT boats were not needed during the Korean War. But, as the United States involvement in the Vietnam grew, the Navy saw a need for small combatant boats for the US Navy's "brown water" river operations. In 1962, two prototype Korean War PT boats were put back in to service as PTF-1 and PTF-2 . PTF-1 and PTF-2 were used by US Navy Seals for special forces activity. The first SEALs arrived in South Vietnam in 1962 as advisers to the Vietnamese naval commandos. They trained the commandos in maritime infiltration techniques and counterinsurgency warfare. Due to the immediate need for fast attack river craft, the US Navy looked at boats already in service with other nations. The Royal Norwegian Navy had built HNoMS Nasty, a prototype boat, in 1958 by Westermoen Båtbyggeri in Mandal, Norway. HNoMS Nasty was designed by Jan Herman Linge. Her prototype boat was of a wooden hull construction. From this boat the Royal Norwegian Navy built a line of 20 Tjeld-class patrol boats. Starting on 1 January 1963, the US Navy took delivery of the first Båtbyggeri boats, with designation Nasty-class patrol boat. A total of 14 Nasty-class patrol boats were built by Båtbyggeri between 1963 and 1965. Båtbyggeri licensed John Trumpy & Sons in Annapolis, Maryland to build seven Nasty-class boats in 1968 and 1970. Some parts of the Trumpy boats were imported from Norway, such as the keel and stem. Sewart Seacraft (Swiftships) in Berwick, Louisiana build four PTF boats of the Osprey class in 1968. The PTF boats were used in Vietnam and operated out of Danang, Vietnam. The boats operated in the Mekong Delta. Each PTF boat carried a 12-man team. The PTF boats supplemented the large fleet of aluminum hulled Patrol Craft Fast (PCF) boats. PTFs were used to carrying out hit-and-run and landing operations. PTFs were also used for United States Army-Navy-SEAL landing, supply drops, base security patrols, harbor security patrols, intelligence gathering, and rescue operations. In December 1965, the US Navy started Operation Game Warden, in which PTF and PCF boats patrolled the major rivers and canals in the Mekong Delta and Rung Sat Special Zone. Most US Navy crews and United States Marine Corps underwent PTF training at the Naval Amphibious Base Coronado. PTF were used by CSS Intelligence Department and Tactical Operations Department, founded April 1, 1964, that were stationed at Lower Base in Tien Sa. CSS also founded two camps: Phoenix va DoDo at Cu Lao Cham (Paradise Island). The PTF boats at these camps were from Vietnamese Navy headquarters. Mobile Support Teams provided combat craft support for SEAL operations, as did Patrol Boat, River and Swift Boat sailors. In February 1964, Boat Support Unit One was founded under Naval Operations Support Group, Pacific. Boat Support Unit One crews operated the PTF boat program. Boat Support Unit Two was formed later, both were later renamed Coastal River Squadron 1 and 2. Boat Support Unit One supported the Navy Special Warfare forces in Vietnam. In 1965, Boat Support Squadron One started training PFT and PCF crews for Vietnamese coastal patrol and interdiction operations. In January 1963, US Navy Seabee (Navy Construction Battalion) arrived South Vietnam to build support bases. Seabees built a PFT and PCF base, also a vast support base at Da Nang and Saigon. These bases support the US Navy, and Marine Corps forces, also some Air Force units and some Army units. PFT noted raids were on Đồng Hới, Yên Phú and Sầm Sơn radar sites, Phuc Loi, and Tiger Island. The PTF raids ended in 1971. The PTF boats were taken to U.S. Naval Base Subic Bay and formed the MST-3 unit in 1972. The PTF boats were taken out of service in 1976 and 1978, with PTF-13 removed in 1972.

== PTF boats ==
=== Prototype PTF ===
The two prototype PTF, PTF-1 and PTF-2 were built for the Korean War in 1951. Both boats a top speed of over 40 knots (74 km/h; 46 mph) from the four 2,500-horsepower (1,900 kW) Packard W-100 gasoline engines with shafts. PTF-1 and PTF-2 were armed with two Bofors 40 mm guns, two twin 20-millimeter (0.79 in) cannon, one .50-caliber machine gun, one "Piggyback" 81 mm mortar and one smoke generator. Both arrived in Da Nang, Vietnam in April 1964. In 1965 after a year of service, the two PTF Boats were 14 years old, with no spare parts, and outdated, they were replaced by newer PTF and PCF boats. Both boats were removed from service and used as US Navy targets. PTC-1 was sunk off Vietnam and PTC-2 was sunk off the Hawaiian Islands.

- PTF-1 was built by Bath Iron Works in Bath, Maine in 1951 as PT-810. PTF-1 had a light displacement of 90 long tons (91 t), length of 89 ft 0 in (27.13 m), beam of 24 ft 1 in (7.34 m), and draft of 5 ft 9 in (1.75 m). She was put in service on 24 November 1951 and was struck from the Naval Register 1 November 1959. She was reactivated on 21 December 1962. PTF 1 was sunk as a target in 1965.
- PTF-2 was built by Trumpy & Sons in Annapolis, Maryland in 1951 as PT-811. PTF-2 had a light displacement of 94 long tons (96 t), and length of 94 ft 0 in (28.65 m), beam of 24 ft 11 in (7.59 m), and draft of 4 ft 2 in (1.27 m). She was put in service on 6 March 1951 and was struck from the Naval Register 1 November 1959. She was reactivated on 21 December 1962. PTF-2 was sunk as a target in 1965.

=== Nasty class ===
The Nasty class were built by two shipyards. Wooden hull PTF boats PTF-3, PTF-4, PTF-5, and PTF-6 arrived at Da Nang, Vietnam in May 1964. PTF-7 and PTF-8 arrived at Da Nang in July 1964. The Nasty-class boats have a displacement of 80 long tons (81 t), a length of 80 ft 4 in (24.49 m), a beam of 24 ft 7 in (7.49 m) and a draft of 3 ft 10 in (1.17 m). Power is derived from two Napier Deltic Turboblown diesel engines with total of 6,200 brake horsepower (4,600 kW) and a top speed of 38 knots (70 km/h; 44 mph). The Napier Deltic engines were built in England.

==== Båtbyggeri ====
Westermoen Båtbyggeri og Mek Verksted, also called A/S Båtservice in the Westermoen Hydrofoil shipyard in Mandal, Norway built 14 Nasty-class patrol boats: PTF-3 to PTF-16.

==== John Trumpy & Sons ====
John Trumpy & Sons of Annapolis, Maryland built six Nasty-class patrol boats: PTF-17 to PTF-21, under license from Båtservice.

=== Osprey class ===
The Osprey-class PTF boats were built by Sewart Seacraft (now Swiftships). Sewart Seacraft built four of the new 3/8-inch (9.5 mm) aluminum alloy hull boats: PTF boats: PTF-23 through PTF-26. Sewart Seacraft was a division of Teledyne Inc.. The chief designer of the 95-foot (29 m) Osprey-class patrol boat was Kenneth Hidalgo. Osprey-class boats have a displacement of 80 long tons (81 t), a length of 94.5 ft (28.8 m), a beam of 24.5 ft (7.5 m) and a draft of 6.8 ft (2.1 m). The Osprey class is powered by two 18-cylinder Napier Deltic diesel engines. Each engine creates 3,100 horsepower (2,300 kW) and were constructed by D. Napier & Son Ltd. of England. The Osprey-class boats have an empty displacement of 150,930 lb (68,460 kg).

- PTF-23 is now a research vessel and diving platform, renamed RV Osprey in St. Augustine, Florida with twin Detroit 12v71 and fuel capacity of 6,281 US gallons (23,780 L; 5,230 imp gal). PTF-23 is now heavily modified. For a time she was named RV Angel Lauren as a research vessel. The PTF-23 was refitted in 2002 by TLG of Miami, Florida, then used for treasure surveys until 2004. In 2011 the vessel was used in the Dominican Republic by Anchor Research & Salvage.
- PTF-24 was sunk as a target 1985 by the US Navy off San Diego, after working with a water jet propulsion conversion testing in the Osprey990 Program with Pegasus-class hydrofoils. PTF-24 served in Vietnam until 1976. In July 1976 she ran aground off San Clemente Island, California.
- PTF-25 was sunk as a target in 1979 by the US Navy, in Pemblico Sound near Marine Corps Air Station Cherry Point, North Carolina at the BT-11 target range-Piney Island Range for USMC pilot training. PTF-25 was modified to look like a Komar-class missile boat. The vessel was sank as a target at 35.026917°N 76.460944°W. PTF-25 operated in Vietnam until 1979.
- PTF-26 is now a museum ship in Golconda, Illinois, still in PTF configuration.

== List of PTF boats ==
=== Prototypes ===
Prototype PTF: PTF-1 and PTF-2 built in 1951.

=== Nasty class ===
Construction data for the Nasty-class PTF boats
| Number | Date of acquisition | Builder | Notes |
|---|---|---|---|
| PTF 3 | December 1962 | Båtbyggeri | Transferred to South Vietnamese Navy January 1966, returned 1970. Stricken 1977; currently located at the DeLand Naval Air Station Museum, DeLand, Florida undergoing restoration as a museum artifact |
| PTF 4 | December 1962 | Båtbyggeri | Sunk 1964 |
| PTF 5 | March 1964 | Båtbyggeri | Transferred to South Vietnamese Navy January 1966, returned 1970. Stricken 1981 |
| PTF 6 | March 1964 | Båtbyggeri | Transferred to South Vietnamese Navy January 1966, returned 1970. Stricken 1977 |
| PTF 7 | March 1964 | Båtbyggeri | Transferred to South Vietnamese Navy January 1966, returned 1970. Stricken 1977 |
| PTF 8 | March 1964 | Båtbyggeri | Sunk 1966 |
| PTF 9 | September 1964 | Båtbyggeri | Sunk 1966 |
| PTF 10 | September 1964 | Båtbyggeri | Stricken 1981 |
| PTF 11 | September 1964 | Båtbyggeri | Stricken 1981 |
| PTF 12 | September 1964 | Båtbyggeri | Stricken 1977 |
| PTF 13 | September 1964 | Westermoen | Stricken 1981 |
| PTF 14 | September 1964 | Båtbyggeri | Sunk 1966 |
| PTF 15 | September 1964 | Båtbyggeri | Sunk 1966 |
| PTF 16 | September 1964 | Båtbyggeri | Sunk 1966 |
| PTF 17 | 1967 | Trumpy | Stricken 1981, currently located at the Buffalo and Erie County Naval & Military Park |
| PTF 18 | 1967 | Trumpy | Stricken 1980 |
| PTF 19 | 1967 | Trumpy | Stricken 1980, currently located at Worton Creek Marina, Chestertown, Maryland. |
| PTF 20 | 1967 | Trumpy | Stricken 1981 |
| PTF 21 | 1968 | Trumpy | Stricken 1981 |
| PTF 22 | 1968 | Trumpy | Stricken 1981 |

=== Osprey class ===
Construction data for the Osprey-class PTF boats
| Number | Date of acquisition | Builder | Notes |
|---|---|---|---|
| {PTF-23 | 13 March 1968 | Sewart Seacraft | Sold 1986, sold 1991 as RV Osprey |
| PTF-24 | 13 March 1968 | Sewart Seacraft | Sunk as a target 1985 by US Navy off San Diego, California |
| PTF-25 | 8 April 1968 | Sewart Seacraft | Sunk as a target in 1979 by US Navy |
| PTF-26 | 8 April 1968 | Sewart Seacraft | 1997 sold to Liberty Maritime Museum, June 2020 sold, as museum ship in Golconda, Illinois, still in PTF configuration |

== Surviving boats ==
- PTF-3 currently at DeLand Naval Air Station Museum
- PTF-17 currently located at the Buffalo and Erie County Naval & Military Park
- PTF-19 currently located at Worton Creek Marina, Chestertown, Maryland under restoration.
- PTF-23 is now a research vessel and diving platform, renamed RV Osprey in St. Augustine, Florida.
- PTF-26 currently at Maritime Pastoral Training Foundation in Golconda, Illinois, part of the Seaman's Church Institute. was at the Liberty Maritime as Sea Scout training ship in Sacramento, California

== Losses ==
Six PTF boats were loss during the war:

- PTF-4 destroyed on 11 November 1965 on special ops after being grounded.
- PTF-8 wrecked in August 1966 on special ops, grounded on reef.
- PTF-9 wrecked 3 March 1966 on special ops, grounded on reef.
- PTF-14 wrecked 28 April 1966 on special ops, grounded on reef.
- PTF-15 wrecked 28 April 1966 on special ops, grounded on reef.
- PTF-16 sunk August 1966 on special ops

== In popular culture ==
=== Vikings in Vietnam: Norwegian Patrol Boat Captains in CIA Clandestine Operations ===
On April 28, 2024, Alessandro Giorgi released a book called Vikings in Vietnam: Norwegian Patrol Boat Captains in CIA Clandestine Operations. The book describes the special forces operations carried out by the CIA in the early days of the Vietnam War. The CIA hired Norwegian PTF boat captains to go into the coast waters of North Vietnam during the Vietnam War to deliver South Vietnamese frogmen and commandos for raids. The raids used U.S.-made Swift patrol boats. The raids have only recently being declassified. Vikings in Vietnam is published buy Schiffer Publishing and is 144 pages.

=== Out Over Blue Water ===
Sean Tierney was one of the first US Navy personnel to serve on PTF boats at Da Nang in 1965 and 1966. Tierney was in the US Navy for ten years. He authored the book, Out Over Blue Water released on August 15, 2022, about his time on PTF boats and in the US Navy. The book is 110 pages from Author House. He also made and released films about his time on the PTF boats in Vietnam. He made film of his time in San Diego Bay at Naval Amphibious Base Coronado. He made a film with tours of PTF-17. Out Over Blue Water was published by St. Martin's Griffin and is 304 pages.

=== Men in Green Faces ===
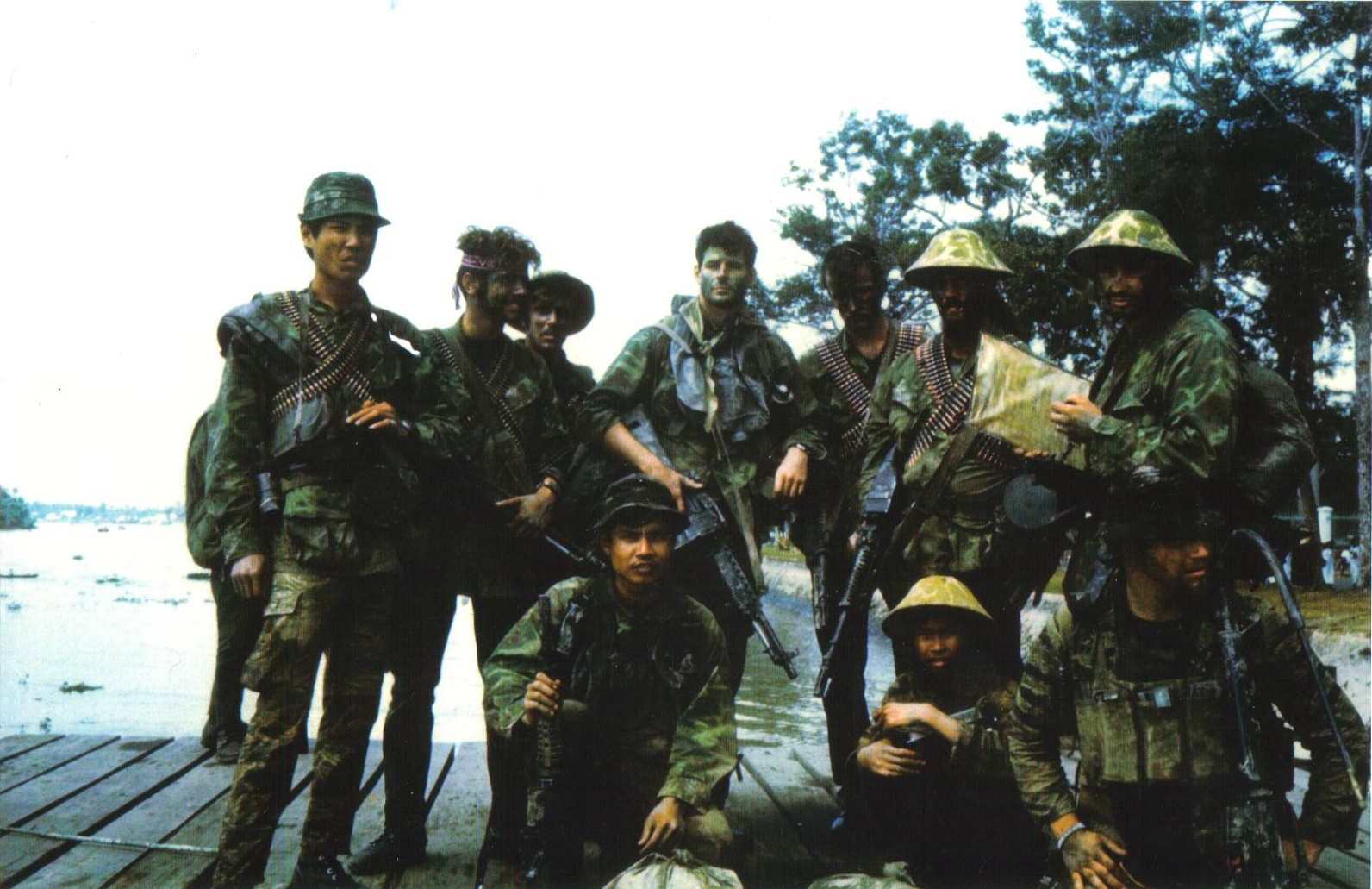
Men in Green Faces in 1970

Men in Green Faces is a book released on January 1, 1992, written by Gene Wentz, a Vietnam veteran, and B. Abell Jurus. Men in Green Faces is a fictional novel about US Navy Seal operations in Vietnam. In the book a US Navy SEAL team hunts for a North Vietnam Army general, the "enforcer", Colonel Nguyen, behind enemy lines. The Seals are with United States Naval Special Warfare Command. The book is 288 pages from St Martins Pr.

== Gallery ==
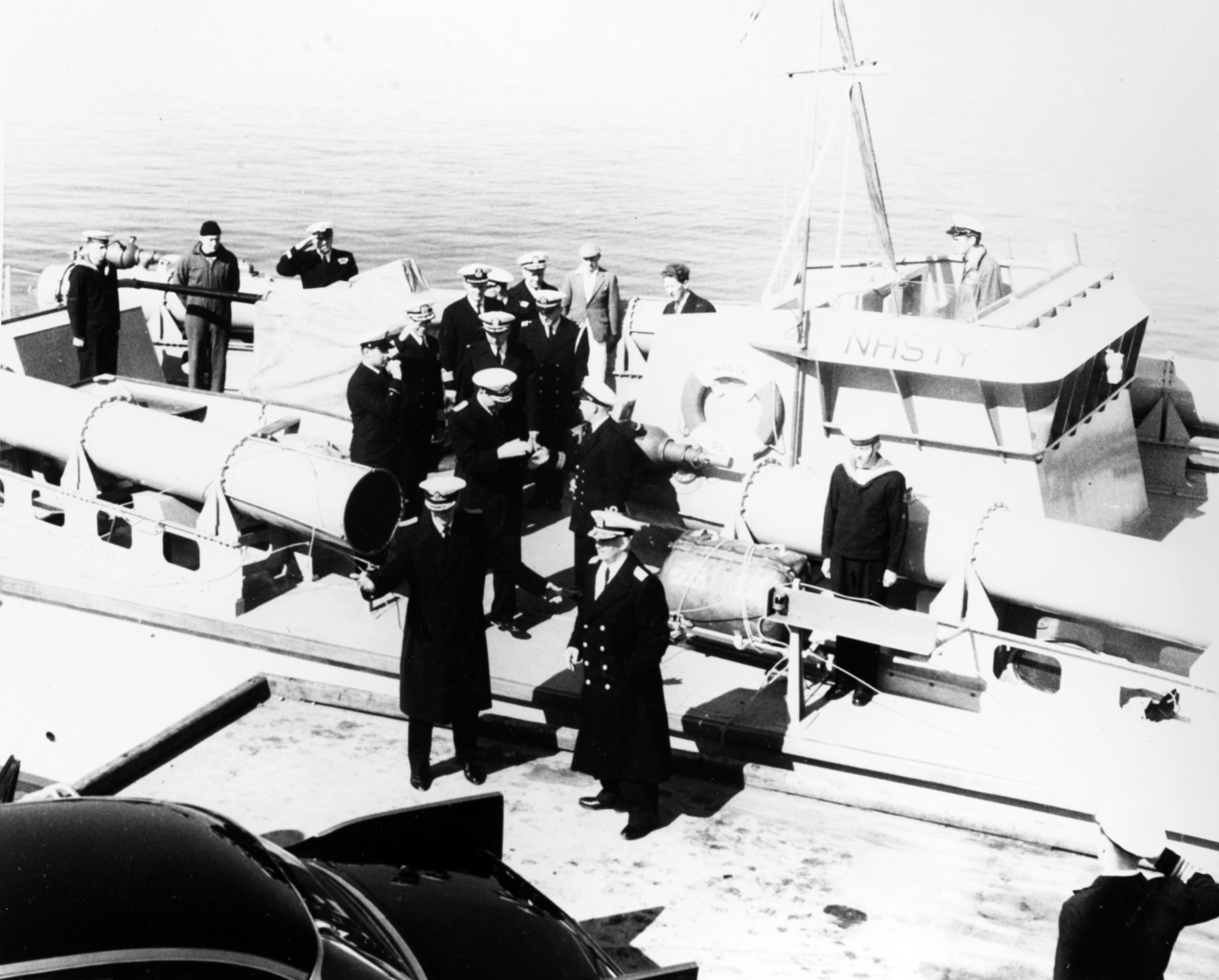
Royal Norwegian Navy motor torpedo boat HNoMS Nasty at Haakonsvern Naval Base, Norway on 11 May 1960

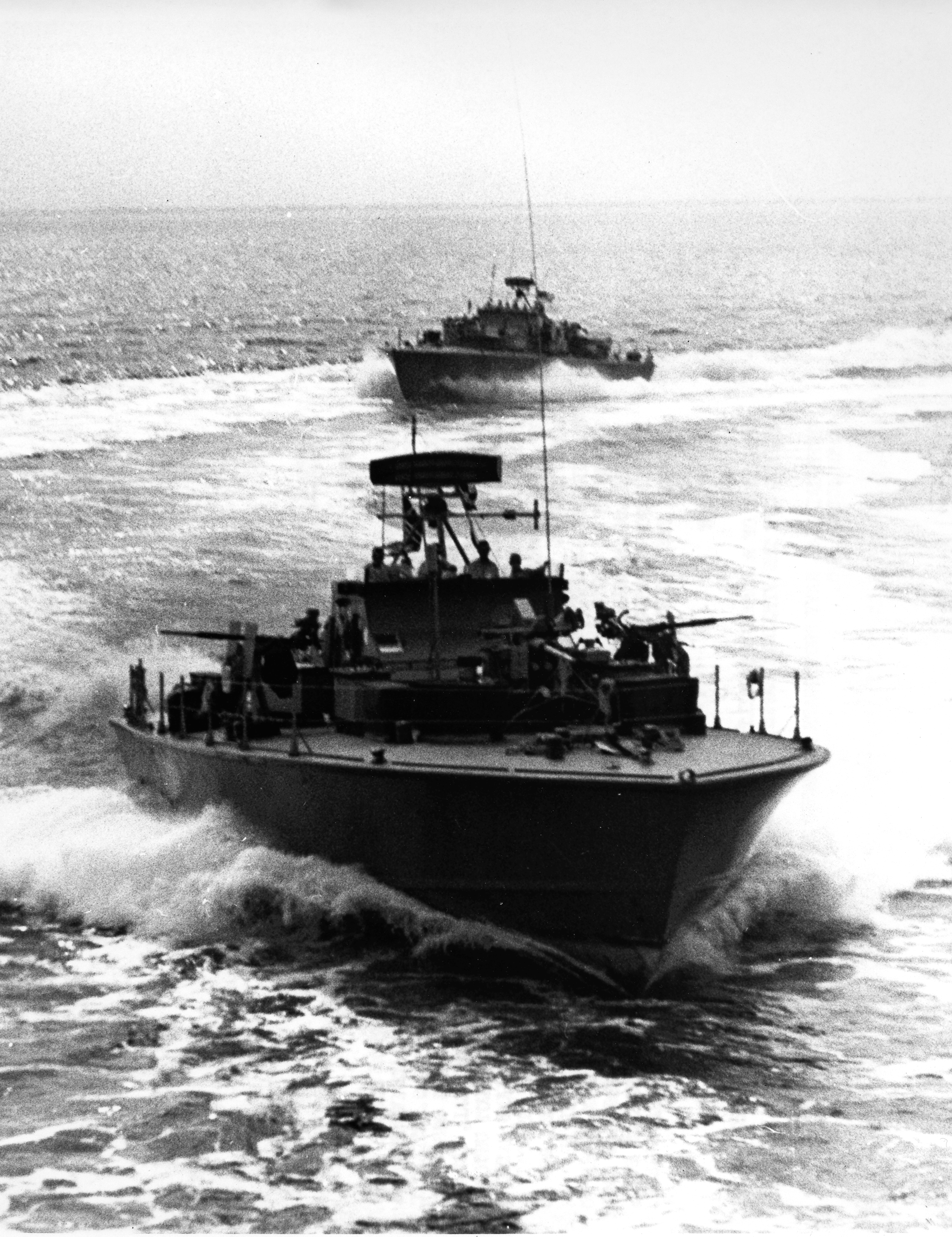
U.S. Navy PTF boats traveling at high speed during trials off the Virginia Capes, United States, early May 1963

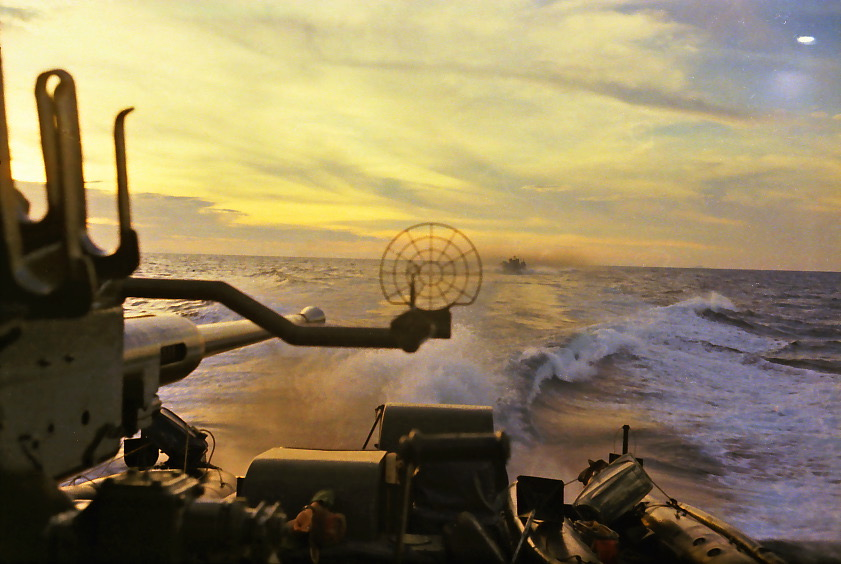
PTFs return from the DMZ, 1971

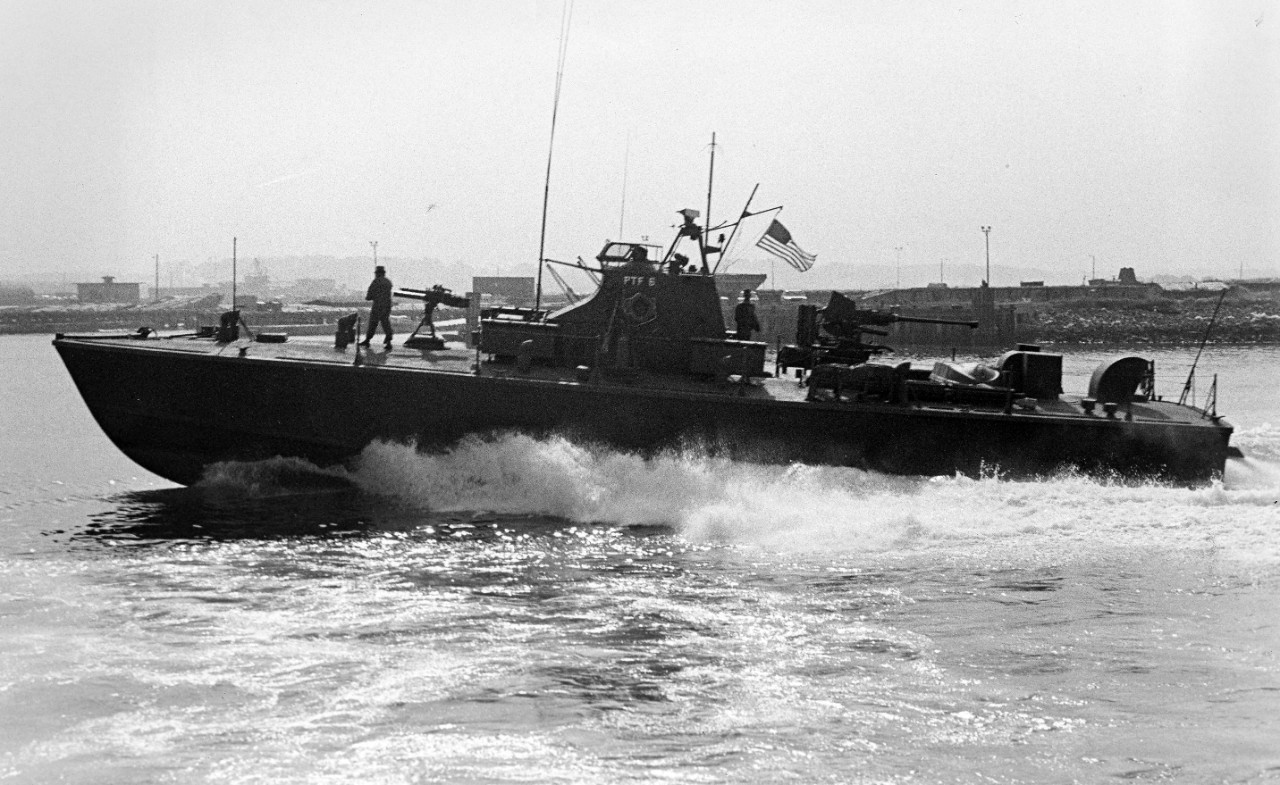
U.S. Navy fast patrol boat PTF-5 cruises in Chesapeake Bay, in 1973

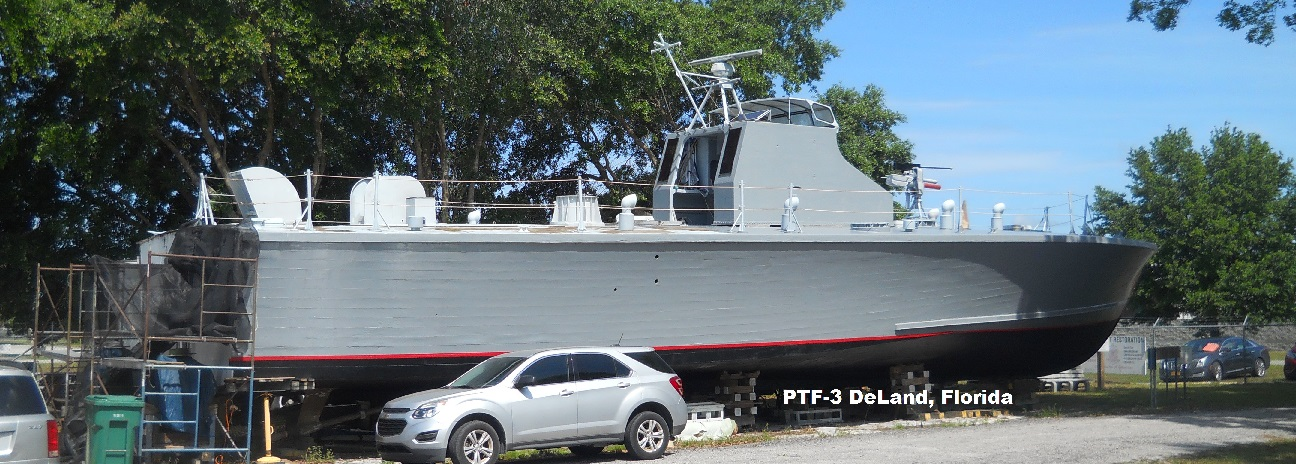
PTF-3, a Nasty-class patrol boat at Deland, Florida

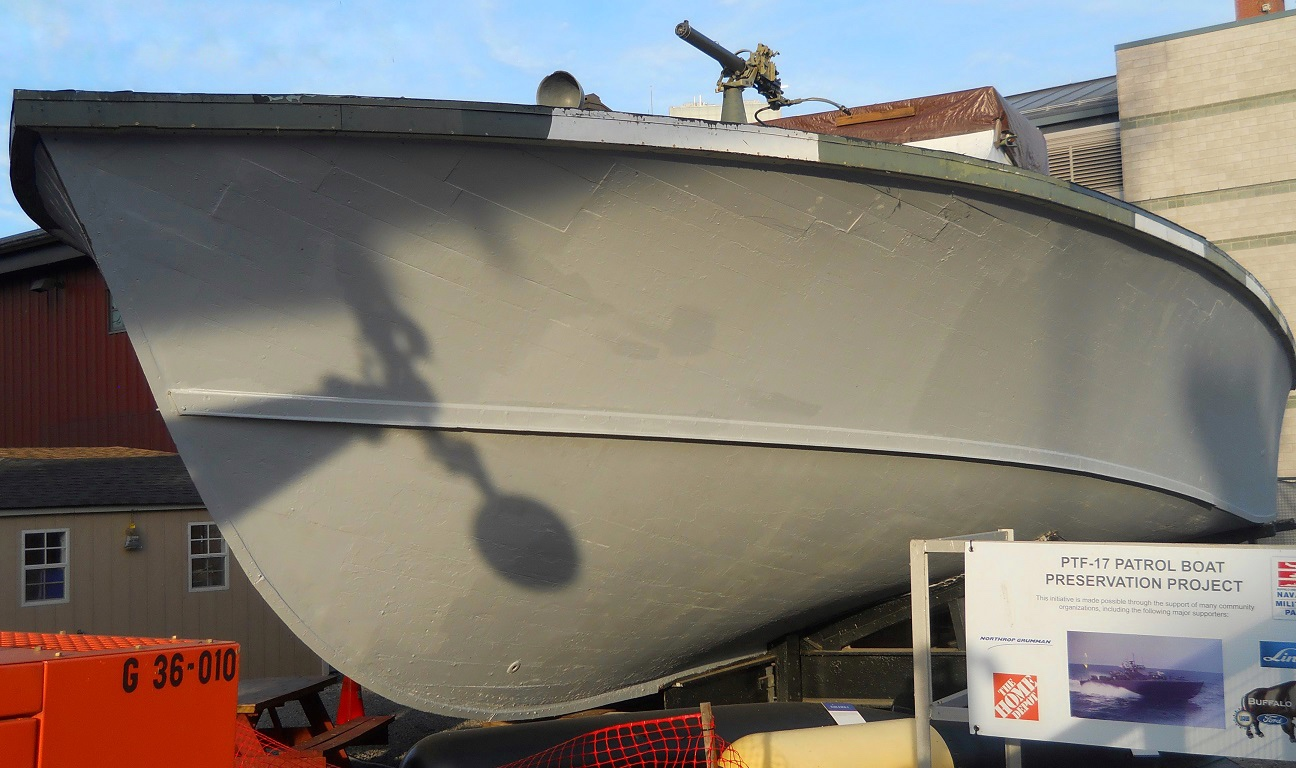
PTF-17 at Buffalo Naval Park

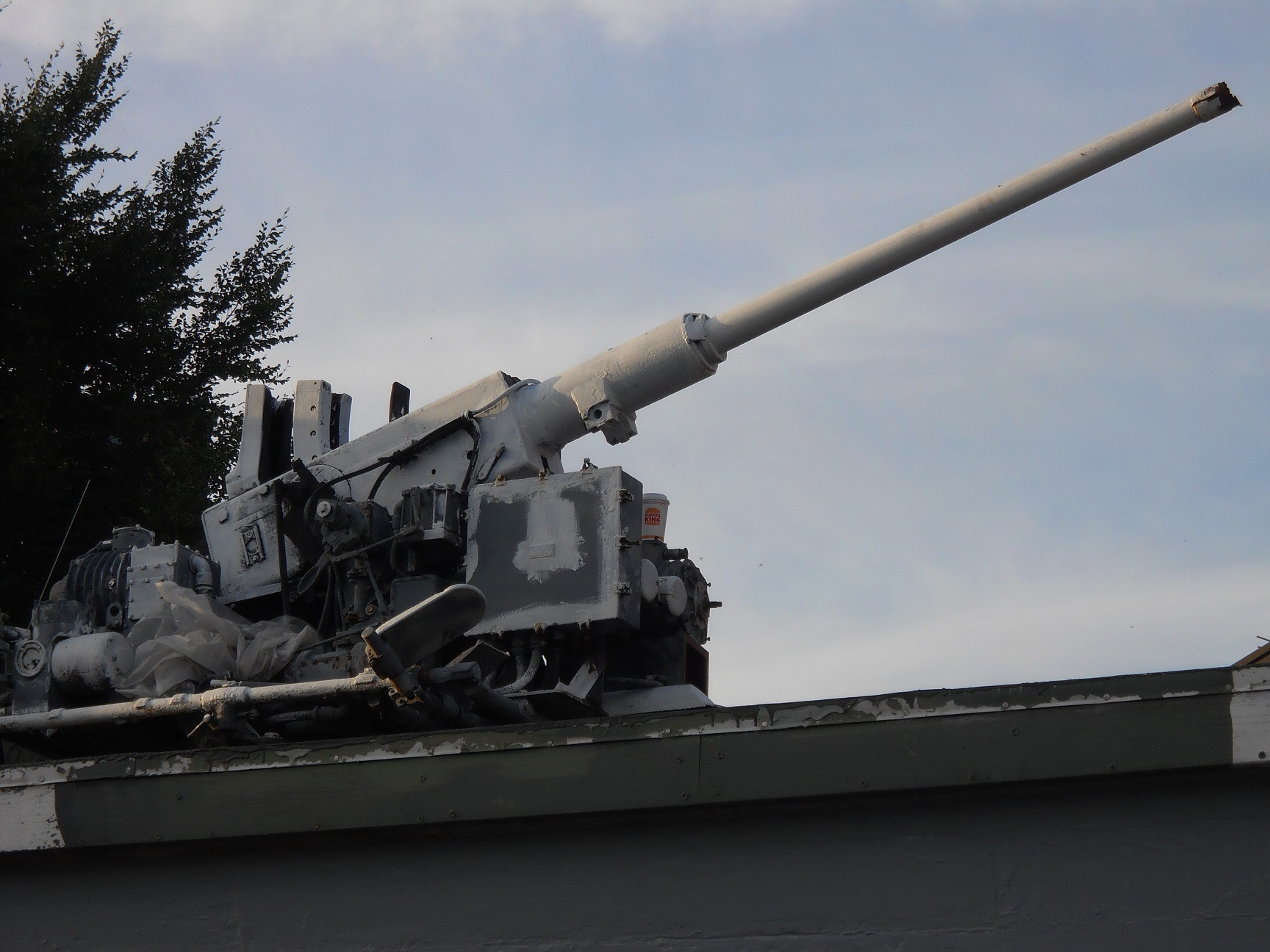
PTF-17's 40 mm anti-aircraft gun

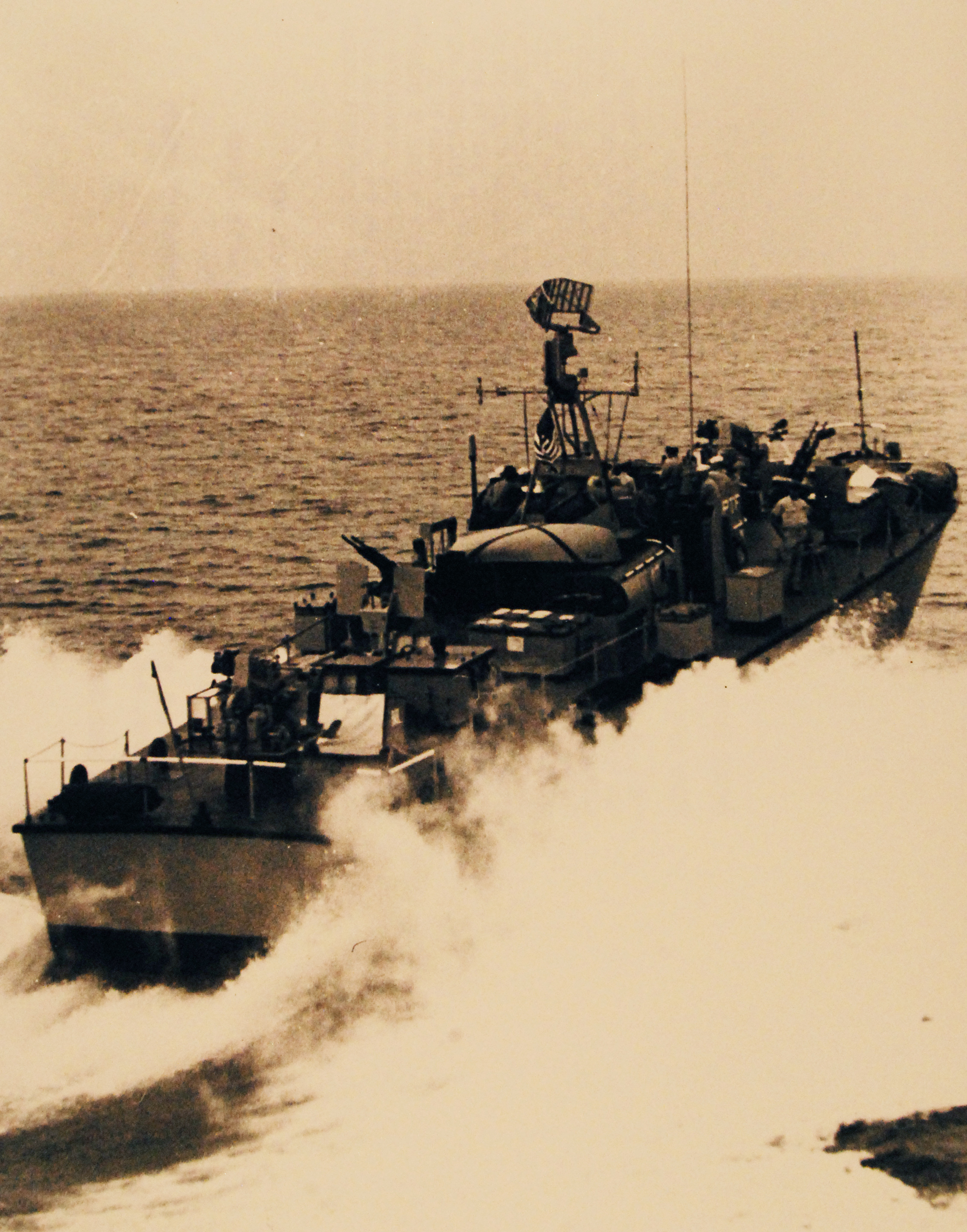
A PTF boat on May 13, 1963

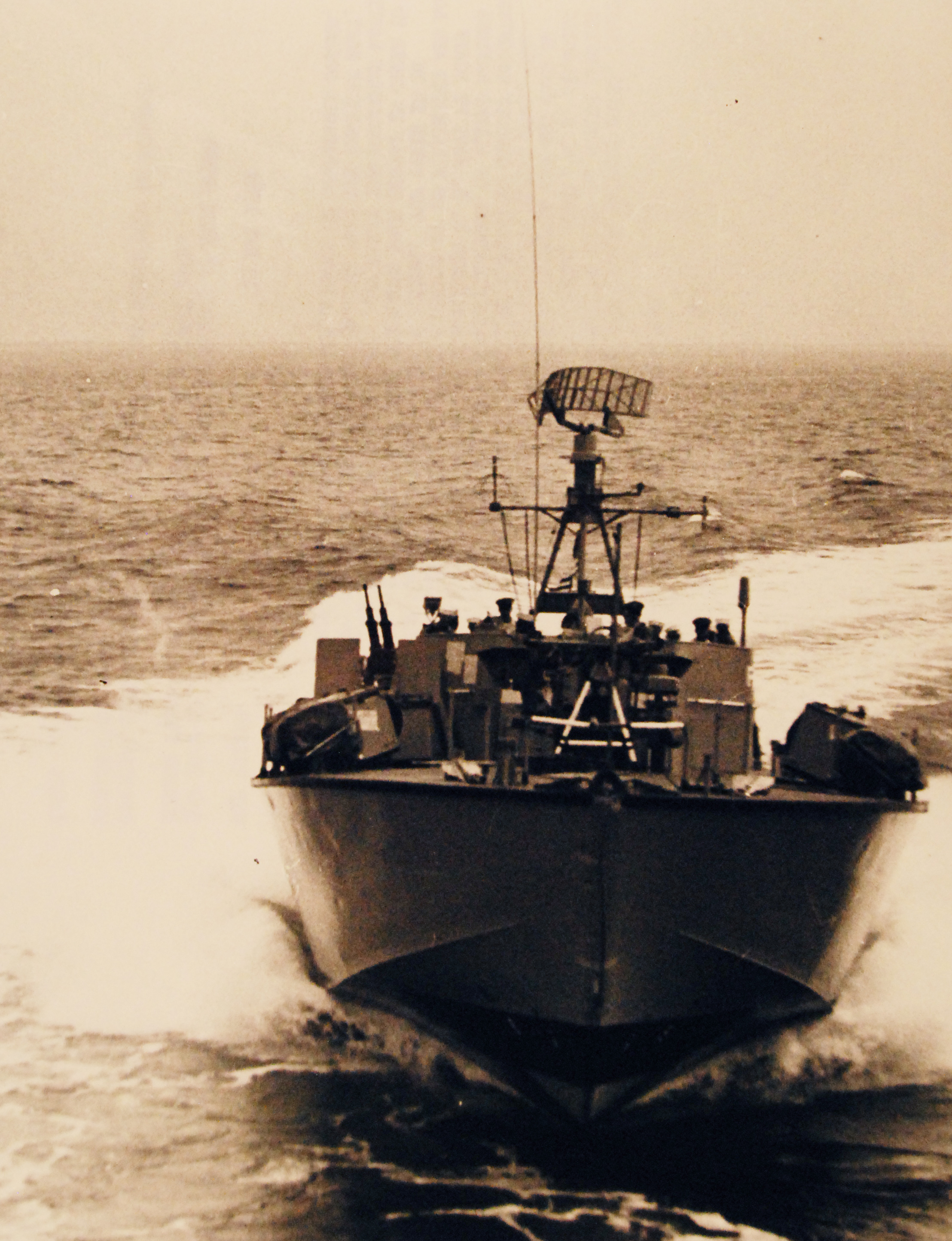
A PTF boat on May 13, 1963

== See also ==
- Gulf of Tonkin incident
