= Kreller Companies =

American corporate investigations and risk consulting firm

Kreller, Inc.
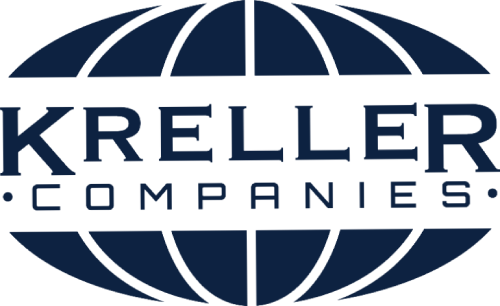
- Corporate logo
- Trade name: Kreller Companies
- Company type: Private
- Industry: Business intelligence
- Founded: 1989; 37 years ago
- Founder: Joseph "Joe" Davidoski
- Headquarters: Cincinnati, Ohio, United States
- Area served: Worldwide
- Key people: Joseph "Joe" Davidoski (President); Harvey Rosen (Chief Operating Officer); Scott Shaffer (Managing Director, Global Due Diligence)
- Services: Corporate investigations; Credit reporting; Due diligence
- Divisions: Kreller Consulting; Kreller Credit; Kreller Group
- Subsidiaries: Smith Brandon International
- Website: kreller.com; krellerconsulting.com; krellercredit.com

Kreller Companies is an American corporate investigations and risk management firm based in Cincinnati, Ohio. Since its founding in the late 1980s, it has advised clients on their use of third-party business information vendors. Today the firm offers a range of business intelligence services, including custom due diligence and investigations.

Kreller Companies employs licensed investigators and analysts with experience in federal, state and local law enforcement. Its corporate offices are located in the United States, and the company has official representation in Mexico, Brazil, China, the United Kingdom, the United Arab Emirates, and Russia.

The firm operates globally across a number of industries, including health care, telecommunications, defense, energy, manufacturing, and finance. Clients include companies, academic institutions, and government agencies.

In January 2020, Kreller Companies announced that it had acquired D.C.-based Smith Brandon International.

== History ==
From 1982 to 1988, Joe Davidoski worked in sales for Dun & Bradstreet, a publicly traded company that, at the time, had a 90% market share of the credit-check market. Davidoski was recognized as one of the company's top salesmen. After raising concerns internally for several years, in June 1988, a day after the enactment of Ohio's Whistleblower Statute, Davidoski sent a letter to management detailing the misleading and unethical nature of the company's selling practices. The story of his employer's alleged misconduct made front-page news, and Davidoski was featured on American news programs, including 20/20. Davidoski's complaints led to several lawsuits and inquiries, including one by the United States Postal Service. In June 1989, Dun & Bradstreet agreed to settle a number of these for $18 million.

In 1989, Davidoski left and formed Kreller, Inc., today known as Kreller Companies. One of the company's initial services was to work with customers to reduce their spend on third-party data providers, including Dun & Bradstreet.

In 1991, Kreller Companies began offering international credit reports. In the mid-1990s, Kreller Companies began offering international due diligence services. In the aftermath of the September 11 attacks, the company's profile rose and its business doubled as Fortune 500 companies sought to sever any possible links to Al Qaeda.

In January 2020, Kreller Companies announced its acquisition of Smith Brandon International (SBI), a boutique corporate investigations and risk consulting firm based in Washington, D.C.

== Companies ==
Kreller Companies offers services across four associated companies: Kreller Group, Kreller Credit, Kreller Consulting, and Smith Brandon International.

=== Kreller Group ===
Kreller Group provides international due diligence and background research using local investigators for on-the-ground intel on entities around the globe. Kreller Group conducts investigations into both companies and individuals with whom clients are considering business dealings, such as joint ventures or mergers and acquisitions. Kreller Group also provides advice on how to select international business partners.

In addition, Kreller Group provides guidance on adherence to anti-corruption acts, such as the Foreign Corrupt Practices Act. In 2012, Kreller Group launched Kreller Online, an online portal to assist clients with ongoing regulatory compliance with anti-corruption acts.

=== Kreller Credit ===
Kreller Credit conducts international credit queries, credit reporting, and in-country risk evaluations and provides assurances that certain credit transactions are authentic. It also assists with collection efforts and asset recovery.

=== Kreller Consulting ===
Kreller Consulting offers clients strategies to reduce their expense on information products sold by third-party vendors, particularly those related to credit, law, insurance, real estate, and debt collections. It also advises clients on best practices when purchasing information service subscriptions.

=== Smith Brandon International ===
In January 2020, Kreller Companies announced that it had acquired Smith Brandon International (SBI). SBI is a boutique corporate investigations and risk consulting firm based in Washington, D.C. The firm offers a range of services, including high-level political analysis, global due diligence, risk avoidance, corporate investigations, financial investigations, political risk assessments and business intelligence services.

== See also ==
- Foreign Corrupt Practices Act
- Smith Brandon International
