= Smith Brandon International =

Smith Brandon International, Inc.
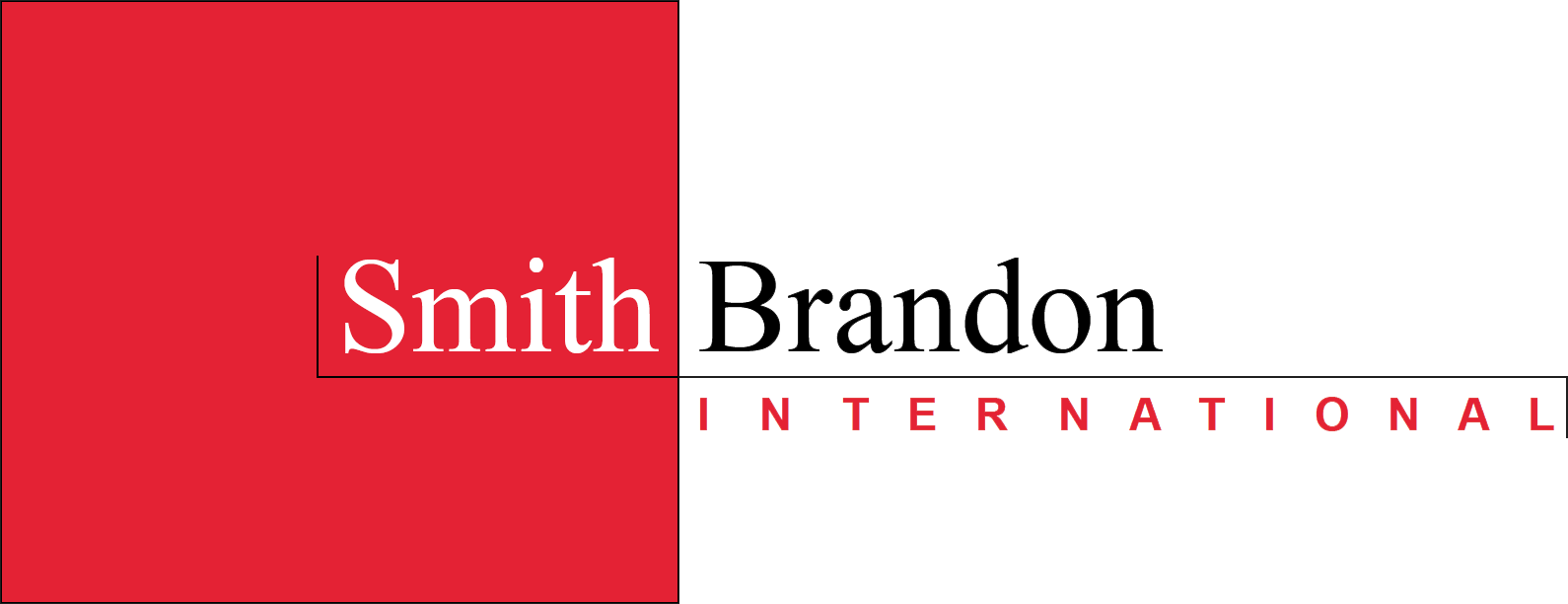
- Corporate logo
- Trade name: SBI
- Type: Subsidiary
- Industry: Business intelligence
- Founded: Washington, D.C., United States (1996)
- Founder: Harry B. "Skip" Brandon; Gene M. Smith
- Headquarters: Washington, D.C.
- Area served: Worldwide
- Services: Due diligence; Corporate investigations
- Parent: Kreller Companies
- Website: www.smithbrandon.com

Smith Brandon International, Inc. (SBI) is an American boutique corporate investigations and risk consulting firm based in Washington, D.C. It was founded in 1996 by Gene M. Smith and Harry "Skip" Brandon and today employs a worldwide network of investigators, including former heads of law enforcement agencies, political figures and professionals with legal, financial and intelligence backgrounds. SBI offers a range of services, including high-level political analysis, global due diligence, risk avoidance, corporate investigations, financial investigations, political risk assessments and business intelligence services.

SBI does not disclose the names of its clients or the specifics of its projects. However, SBI's clients include domestic and foreign Fortune 50 companies, as well as small- and medium-sized companies, working internationally in many industries, such as banking, oil, mining and timber. With assistance from its international network of contacts in the intelligence, business and diplomatic communities, SBI has worked across North America, Latin America, the Middle East, Asia, Africa and India. Ninety-five percent of their work is outside of the U.S.

Founders Smith and Brandon have had close ties with U.S. governmental agencies; Smith was a CIA officer and Brandon was deputy assistant director of the National Security and Counter Terrorism programs for the FBI. Both have contributed to various industry journals, such as the Harvard Business Review, and have spoken at various conferences and on national radio programs, including NPR’s Talk of the Nation.

In January 2020, Kreller Companies acquired SBI.
