= Patrol Craft Fast =

Type of coastal and riverine patrol boat

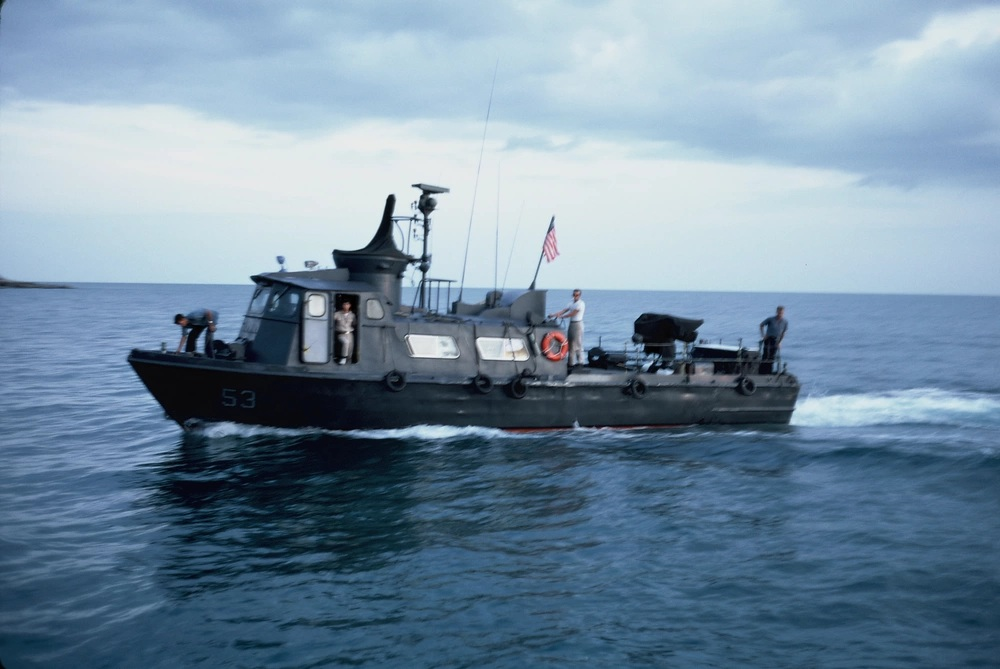
- PCF-53 on patrol.

Class overview
- Name: PCF (Patrol Craft Fast)
- Builders: Sewart Seacraft (now Swiftships)
- Operators: See Operators
- Preceded by: PTF boat
- In service: 1967-Present
- Completed: 193
- Active: 5+
- Preserved: 4 non-operational 2 operational

General characteristics
- Type: Riverine patrol boat
- Length: 50 ft (15 m) (Mk I); 51 ft (16 m) (Mk II); 94.5 ft (28.8 m) (Osprey-Class)
- Beam: 13 ft (4.0 m)
- Draft: 3 ft (0.91 m)
- Propulsion: 2x General Motors 12V71"N" Detroit marine diesels
- Speed: 32 knots (59 km/h; 37 mph) (Mk I)
- Range: 800 km
- Armament: 2x 0.50 caliber machine gun (top) (US-based); 1x 81mm mortar (US-based); 1x Mk 19 (US-based); 1x NSV (Vietnamese-based); 1x DShK (Vietnamese-based); 1x AGS-17 (Vietnamese-based)
- Armor: Quarter inch thick aluminum hull

The Patrol Craft Fast (PCF), also known as the Swift Boat, were all-aluminum, 50-foot (15 m) long, shallow-draft vessels operated by the United States Navy, initially to patrol the coastal areas and later for work in the interior waterways as part of the brown-water navy to interdict Vietcong movement of arms and munitions, transport South Vietnamese forces and insert SEAL teams for counterinsurgency (COIN) operations during the Vietnam War.

== Development ==
=== Conception ===
The Swift Boat was conceived in a Naval Advisory Group, Military Assistance Command, Vietnam (NAVADGRP MACV) staff study titled "Naval Craft Requirements in a Counter Insurgency Environment," published 1 February 1965. The study was positively received, and the Navy began to search for sources. Sewart Seacraft of Berwick, Louisiana (Swiftships' predecessor), built water taxis for companies operating oil rigs in the Gulf of Mexico, which appeared nearly ideal. The Navy bought their plans, and asked Sewart Seacraft to prepare modified drawings that included a gun tub, ammo lockers, bunks, and a small galley. The Navy used those enhanced plans to request bids from other boat builders. Sewart Seacraft was chosen to build the boats.

=== Mark I ===
The Swift Boats had welded aluminum hulls about 50 feet (15 m) long with 13 feet (4.0 m) beam, and draft of about five feet (1.5 m). They were powered by a pair of General Motors 12V71"N" Detroit marine diesel engines rated at 480 horsepower (360 kW) each, with a design range from 320 nautical miles (590 km) at 21 knots (39 km/h) to about 750 nautical miles (1,390 km) at 10 knots (19 km/h). The normal complement for a Swift Boat was six: an officer in charge (skipper), a boatswains mate, a radar/radioman (radarman), an engineer (engineman), and two gunners (quartermaster and gunner's mate). In 1969, the crew was supplemented with a Vietnamese trainee.

The first two PCFs were delivered to the Navy in late August 1965. The original water taxi design had been enhanced with two .50 caliber M2 Browning machine guns in a turret above the pilot house, an over-and-under .50-caliber machine gun – 81 mm mortar combination mounted on the rear deck, a mortar ammunition box on the stern, improved habitability equipment such as bunks, a refrigerator and freezer, and a sink. The 81 mm combination mortar mounted on the rear deck was not a gravity firing mortar as used by the Army and Marine Corps, in which the falling projectile's primer struck the fixed firing pin at the base of the mortar tube, but a unique lanyard firing weapon in which the projectile was still loaded into the muzzle. The gunner could "fire at will" by the use of the lanyard. The weapon had been tested in the 1950s and discarded as the U.S. Navy lost interest in the system. The United States Coast Guard maintained the gun/mortar system before the Navy incorporated it into the PCF program. Many boats also mounted a single M60 machine gun in the forward peak tank, just in front of the forward superstructure.

The original order for 50 boats was followed shortly by an additional order for 54 more Mark Is.

=== Mark II and Mark III ===
In the latter half of 1967, 46 Mark II boats, with a modified deck house set further back from the bow. The newer boats also had round port holes (replacing larger sliding windows) in the aft superstructure. From 1969 through 1972, 33 Mark IIIs, which were a larger version of the Mark IIs, arrived in Vietnam.

== Service ==
Most of the 193 PCFs built were used by the U.S. Navy in Vietnam and the two training bases in California. About 80 of the boats constructed were sold or given away to nations friendly to the United States. The original training base for Swift Boats was at Naval Amphibious Base Coronado.

In 1969, training was moved to Mare Island near San Pablo Bay, California, where it remained for the duration of the war. Though not a deep water boat, PCF training boats frequently transited from Mare Island, through the Golden Gate Bridge to cruise either north or south along the Pacific Ocean coastline. PCF-8 sank in a storm off Bodega Bay, California in December 1969. This was the only Swift Boat lost during training operations. No crewmen were lost in the event.

The most frequent training area for the Mare Island units was the marshland that forms the northern shoreline of San Francisco Bay. This area, now known as the Napa Sonoma Marshes State Wildlife Area, was also used by United States Navy Reserve unit PBRs) up until 1995, when Mare Island was scheduled for base closure.

=== Vietnam War service ===
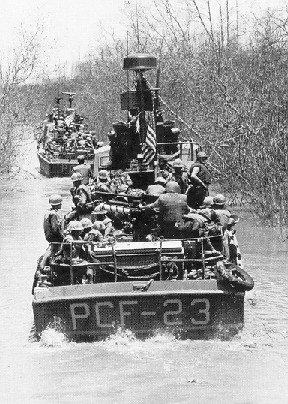
PCFs carry a group of South Vietnamese marines up a narrow canal for insertion.

The first Swift Boats arrived in South Vietnam in October 1965. The boats were initially used as coastal patrol craft in Operation Market Time, interdicting seaborne supplies on their way to the Viet Cong (VC) and People's Army of Vietnam (PAVN) forces in South Vietnam. However, the design's shallow draft and low freeboard limited their seaworthiness in open waters. These limitations, plus the difficulties being encountered in the interior waterways by the smaller, more lightly armed PBRs, led to the incorporation of Swifts to patrol the 1,500 miles (2,400 km) of rivers and canals of Vietnam's interior waterways. Swift Boats continued to operate along the Vietnamese coastal areas, but with the start of Admiral Elmo Zumwalt's "SEALORDS" riverway interdiction strategy, their primary area of operations soon centered upon the Cà Mau Peninsula and the Mekong Delta area in the southern tip of Vietnam. Here they patrolled the waterways and performed special operations, including gunfire support, troop insertion and evacuation, and raids into enemy territory.

The Mekong Delta is composed of ten thousand square miles of marshland, swamps and forested areas. The region is interlaced by rivers and canal ways. Controlled by the VC, the interior waterways of the Mekong Delta were used to transport supplies and weapons.

Swift Boats generally operated in teams of three to five. Each boat had an officer in charge, one of whom would also be placed in overall charge of the mission. Their missions included patrolling the waterways, searching water traffic for weapons and munitions, transporting South Vietnamese marine units and inserting Navy SEAL teams.

When the Swift Boats began making forays up the waterways into the interior of the delta, they initially took the carriers by surprise, causing them to drop their materials and run off into the overgrowth. Occasionally a short firefight would break out. As it became clear that control of the waterways was being contested, the Viet Cong developed a number of tactics to challenge the U.S. Navy. They set up ambushes and built obstructions in the canals to create choke points and began to place mines in the waterways.

For the Swifts, coming back down river was always more dangerous than going up river. The passage of a patrol assured their eventual return, providing an opportunity for the VC. Ambushes were typically short lived affairs, set up at a river bend or in a narrow canal that restricted the maneuverability of the boats. A wide variety of portable weapons were used in attacks, including recoilless rifles, B-40 rockets, .50 caliber machine guns and AK-47s, often fired from behind earthen bunkered positions. Engagements were brief and violent, with the ambushers often slipping away into the undergrowth when the boats located the source of attack and began to concentrate their return fire. When attacked the boats would accelerate out of the hot zone, turn and then return as a group, firing as many of their guns as they could bring to bear. They would power past the ambush point, turn and return to attack again until the ambushers were either killed or slipped away. Though most cruising and patrolling was done at 8 to 10 knots, the boats could reach a top speed of 32 knots. Thick brush and vegetation in the delta provided excellent cover for the escaping ambushers. Casualties taken among the river crews were high. Casualties suffered among the VC were difficult to assess, as they would take their dead and wounded away from a firefight. Discovering newly dug graveyards was one of the few ways to confirm VC losses.

The first Swift Boat to be lost during the war was PCF-4, which was lost to a mine in 1966. Two boats, PCF-14 and PCF-76, were lost in rough seas at the mouth of the Cua Viet River near the DMZ, and a third, PCF-77, was lost in a rescue effort during a monsoon at the mouth of the Perfume River on the approach to Huế. All three of these boats were lost in 1966. PCF-41 was lost that same year in an ambush when it was hit by fire from a 57 mm recoilless rifle. Its controls destroyed and coxswain killed, it ran aground at speed. When the crew ran out of ammunition it had to be abandoned. It was recovered the next day but was too badly damaged to be repaired, so was salvaged instead.

PCF-43 was lost to a rocket attack in 1969. Several other Swift Boats had been lost to river mines, but had been salvaged and either repaired or used for spare parts.

When Vietnamization was implemented, several Swift Boats were turned over to the South Vietnamese Navy.

==== Controversy over loss of PCF-19 ====
Sinking of PCF-19
- Part of Operation Market Time, Vietnam War
Date	June 16, 1968; ~0030 - 0400 hours (UTC+07:00)
Location	Bến Hải & Cửa Việt Rivers, South Vietnam
Result	Determined to be a friendly fire incident due to an unrelated incident in the same area the next day

Belligerents
North Vietnam	United States

Commanders and leaders
Unknown	LTJG John Davis; LTJG Peter Snyder; LTJG Ronald Fritz; Col Dominic Damico

Strength
2-4 Mi-4 helicopters 1 unknown fixed-wing aircraft	2 PCFs; 1 point-class cutter 1 F-4 Phantom II

Casualties and losses
1 helicopter allegedly damaged	1 PCF destroyed 5 killed 2 wounded

On the night of 15/16 June 1968, U.S. Marine Corps aircraft spotters on the ground began reporting unidentified helicopters near the DMZ. The first report stated that four helicopters had been detected and were proceeding toward Tiger Island, just off the North Vietnamese coast at an altitude of 700–1,000 feet (210–300 m). These spotters observed the aircraft visually, using Starlight Scopes and by radar. Over the course of the night, Air Force pilots reported 19 additional helicopter sightings. On this same evening the guided missile heavy cruiser USS Boston, operating near the DMZ, also began reporting helicopter activity in the vicinity of Bến Hải, Cap Lay and Tiger Island. At 00:10 on the 16th, an unidentified aircraft fired three rockets or missiles at Boston, but none hit the vessel.

At 01:00 on 16 June 1968 in the same area, PCF-19 was struck by two missiles, one struck the cabin just below the pilothouse on the port side, the other hit the engine room. The boat sank in four minutes. Four of its crewmen were killed, and two others badly injured. The remaining crew managed to swim free from the sinking craft and cling to a life raft until USCGC Point Dume arrived on scene at 01:30. As soon as the survivors were on board, Point Dume departed the scene to drop them off at the Cua Viet Base for a medevac to Danang. In the meantime, the crew of PCF-12, which had arrived on the scene at 01:50 to continue the search for survivors, noticed illumination rounds being fired that were not their own. Opting to investigate, the officer in charge ordered the boat to speed to the Cua Viet River. When PCF-12 was 3 miles (4.8 km) from the river mouth, crewmembers observed two sets of aircraft lights off the port and starboard beam, about 300 yards (270 m) away and 100 feet (30 m) above the water. The boat commander immediately got on the radio and requested permission to engage the aircraft. At 02:25, PCF-12 received a single rocket from seaward at a low trajectory. The rocket passed a couple of feet over the main cabin and exploded in the water ten feet from the boat. PCF-12 came about, increased speed and moved away from the kill zone while bringing its .50-caliber guns to bear against an aerial target hovering at 1,000 feet (300 m) with lights blinking. The aircraft decreased altitude and turned off its lights. After a short time, PCF-12 stopped to observe the scene and saw two aircraft appeared off its beams again with lights on. The boat commander contacted the marine observer and inquired about their status. The marines told him that they could not identify the aircraft because they did not have their identification, friend or foe (IFF) transponders turned on. At 02:35, the aircraft near the beach fired 40–50 rounds of .50-caliber tracer fire at the PCF. All rounds landed astern. PCF-12 responded with machine-gun and mortar fire.

At 02:40, Point Dume, now back on the scene was attacked by a fixed-wing aircraft, which made two attack runs against the vessel. Both the commanding officer of Point Dume and the commander of PCF-12 positively identified the aircraft as a "jet." The crews of Point Dume and PCF-12 then observed numerous lighted aircraft that appeared to be helicopters in the northern part of the area. These aircraft approached the U.S. vessels and made firing runs with their lights off. Point Dume received heavy caliber automatic weapons fire from these aircraft and returned fire. PCF-12 also returned fire intermittently for approximately 75 minutes. Neither vessel was damaged in the engagement; there were no personnel injured.

On the afternoon of 16 June, Task Unit 77.1.0 ordered USS Edson, USS Theodore E. Chandler and the Royal Australian Navy guided-missile destroyer HMAS Hobart to conduct a surveillance mission in the vicinity of Tiger Island in attempt to flush out any enemy helicopters or waterborne craft operating from there. At 01:18 on the 17th, Boston, which was engaged in a naval gunfire support mission in the same general area, came under attack from an unidentified jet aircraft. The jet fired two missiles at the ship: one exploded 200 yards (180 m) off the port beam; and the other close aboard to port, showering the ship with fragments. No sailors were injured, and the missiles caused only minor structural damage to the ship. At 03:09, while Hobart was searching a 5-mile radius area between the coast and Tiger Island with its radar, it detected a single aircraft tracking east. The aircraft was not squawking IFF. An attempt was made to identify the aircraft by visual gun direction personnel on the bridge. Five minutes later a missile slammed into the chief petty officers' mess and nearby spaces, killing one sailor and wounding two others. The ship took evasive action but temporarily lost radar contact with the aircraft. At 03:16, two more missiles hit the ship, destroying the gunners' store and damaging other spaces, including the engineers' workshop, the seamen's mess, the missile director room, the RIM-24 Tartar checkout room, and the chiefs' mess (again). This second attack killed an officer and wounded other sailors. As the aircraft turned to make a third pass, one of the ship's gun turrets fired five rounds and the aircraft turned and retreated. Fourteen minutes later Edson, now at general quarters due to reports from Hobart about hostile aircraft in the area, came under attack by an unidentified aircraft. Lookouts and sonar confirmed a near miss astern by a missile.

The next day Vice Admiral William F. Bringle, Commander Seventh Fleet, appointed Rear Admiral S.H. Moore, Commander Task Group 77.1/70.8, to conduct an informal investigation into the various firing incidents occurring between 15 and 17 June. The board determined that Air Force F-4s launched two AIM-7E Sparrow missiles on 17 June at 01:15 and one at 03:15 that same day. Fragments of Sparrow missiles complete with serial numbers found on Boston and Hobart confirmed these findings. The case was therefore quite clear with regard to these two attacks on 17 June – Hobart and Boston had been the victims of friendly fire. The board also investigated the 16 June attacks on Boston and PCF-19 and the attack on Edson on the 17th. From the positions of American vessels and attacking aircraft, the board concluded that Air Force aircraft attacked Boston and PCF-19 on the 16th and that American aircraft also attacked Edson on the 17th. Unlike the Boston and Hobart attacks on the 17th, however, no physical evidence supported these findings. Later research of the incident with surviving veterans and a review of salvage reports from USS Acme, the ship that recovered the bodies and codebooks from PCF-19 shortly after the attack, found that the rocket entry holes in the hull of PCF-19 were 76.2mm in size—the size of a standard helicopter rocket carried by a Soviet-manufactured Mi-4 Hound helicopter and not Sparrow or Sidewinder holes, which would have been larger.

=== Vietnam People's Navy service ===
The Vietnam People's Navy managed to capture 99 of Republic of Vietnam Navy PCFs after the Fall of Saigon in 1975. The PCFs were quickly used in VPN operations at Thổ Chu and other islands to repel the invasion of the Khmer Rouge. The Swift Boats are still active in the Vietnam People's Navy.

The M2 machine gun was replaced by a domestically produced 12.7 mm NSV gun, which had fewer jamming problems and was easier for the crews to maintain. The electronic and communication systems were also overhauled. Some PCFs captured have a DsHK HMG and an AGS-17 AGL mounted on top. The 81mm mortar was left untouched.

== Operators ==
=== Current ===
- Vietnam: Vietnam People's Navy, taken from the former South Vietnam Navy. M2 HMG and other American-installed components replaced with Soviet NSV or DShK and AGS-17.

=== Former ===
- Khmer Republic: Khmer National Navy.
- Malta: Maritime Squadron of the Armed Forces of Malta.
- Panama: The MN GC-201 Comandante Torrijos and MN GC-202 Presidente Porras acquired from the US in the 1980s for the Panamanian Navy.
- Philippines: Philippine Navy & Philippine Coast Guard.
- South Vietnam: Republic of Vietnam Navy. Reportedly around 107 Swift boats lost in service with 99 boats captured by North Vietnam.
- United States: U.S. Navy
- Thailand: Royal Thai Navy.

=== Non-State Actors ===
- Khmer Rouge: captured from the U.S. and Khmer Navy.

== Preservation ==
=== Malta ===
Former U.S. Navy Vietnam veterans, from the Swift Boat Sailors' Association, visited Malta in 2010 and said the Malta Swifts were the last two still in service, out of hundreds that were built. One of the two patrol boats headed back to the United States to become a memorial in summer 2012 at the Maritime Museum of San Diego in California.

The museum has a display paying tribute to the Maltese servicemen who died on board the P23 (the sister vessel of P24) during an accident that occurred on September 7, 1984. The incident – known as the C23 tragedy and the worst peace-time accident suffered by Maltese services personnel – killed five AFM soldiers and two policemen when illegal fireworks about to be dumped into the sea exploded on the bow of the small patrol boat.

The AFM retained P23 as a memorial to those killed in the explosion. P23 was also depicted on a Maltese postage stamp commemorating the island's maritime heritage on 10 August 2011.

=== Philippines ===
A Swift Mk.3-class PB-353 physically restored and converted to museum display at the re-launched Philippine Navy Museum, Fort San Felipe, Cavite.

=== Vietnam ===
In September 2023, a PCF formerly used by the 962nd Brigade, 9th Military Region was preserved and placed on display at the President Ton Duc Thang Memorial Area after it was refurbished for five months.

=== United States ===
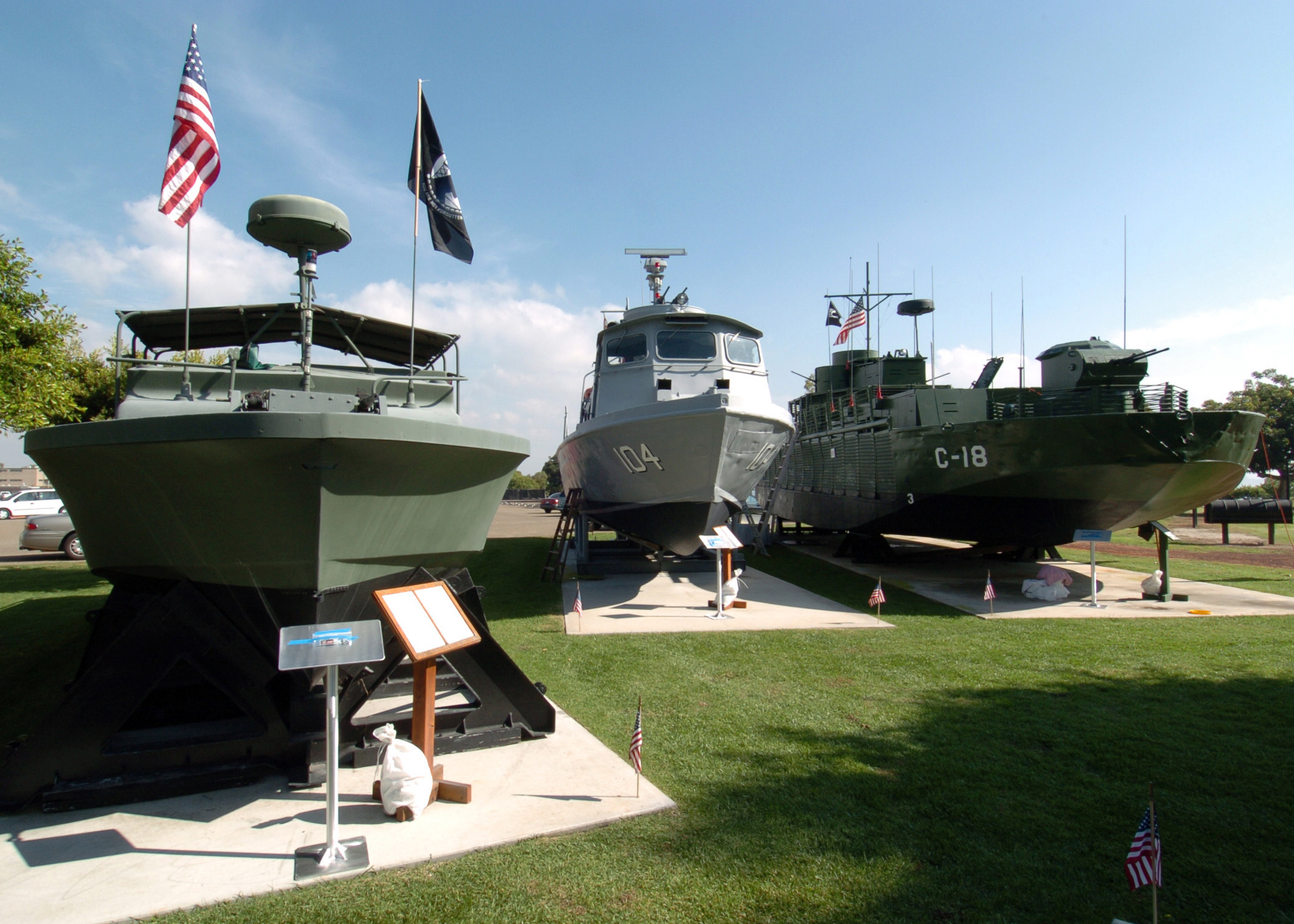
A preserved PCF 104 boat in the middle, located at the Vietnam Unit Memorial Monument, Naval Amphibious Base Coronado.

There are two operational PCFs in the United States today. R/V Matthew F. Maury is operated by Tidewater Community College in Virginia Beach, Virginia. Formerly PCF-2, the vessel was awarded to the college in 1995 and has been used in oceanographic research and education since then. It is berthed at JEB Little Creek and operates in and around Chesapeake Bay. The second operational PCF, PCF-816 (formerly P-24 in the service of Malta) is operational in San Diego, California at the Maritime Museum of San Diego. The boat makes regular runs on weekends and is staffed with former Swift Boat sailors as narrators.

There are two Swift Boats preserved in static displays in the United States. Both are former U.S. Navy Swift Boats that were originally stationed in California to train PCF crews. One is located at the Navy Museum at Washington Navy Yard in Washington, D.C.; the second Swift Boat is on the Naval Special Weapons Base at Naval Amphibious Base Coronado, California, the original home of PCF training.

== Notable personnel ==
Those who served on the boats in Vietnam and later became politicians include Nebraska Governor and U.S. Senator Bob Kerrey, a recipient of the Medal of Honor, and Arizona Congressman Jim Kolbe, who served in the United States Navy.

U.S. Senator and Secretary of State John Kerry commanded a Swift Boat when he served in Vietnam. LTJG Kerry was awarded the Silver Star, Bronze Star and three Purple Hearts during riverine combat in a PCF.

== Controversy ==
As the Democratic nominee for president in 2004, then-Senator Kerry's military record was attacked by a political 527 group called Swift Boat Veterans for Truth. Ever since, the term "swiftboating" has entered American political jargon associating swift boat service with political smear tactics.

In an article in The New York Times on June 30, 2008, Swift Boat veterans objected to the prevalent use of the verb "swiftboating" as this type of ad hominem attack, stating that it is disrespectful to the men who served and died on the PCFs during Vietnam.

== See also ==
- PTF 26 Patrol Craft Fast Museum ship at Golconda, Illinois
- Patrol Boat, River, PBR, 32-foot (9.8 m) long, all fiberglass boat, with twin water jet propulsion, used on rivers.
