= Swiftships Model 35PB1208 E-1455 =

Navy patrol vessel

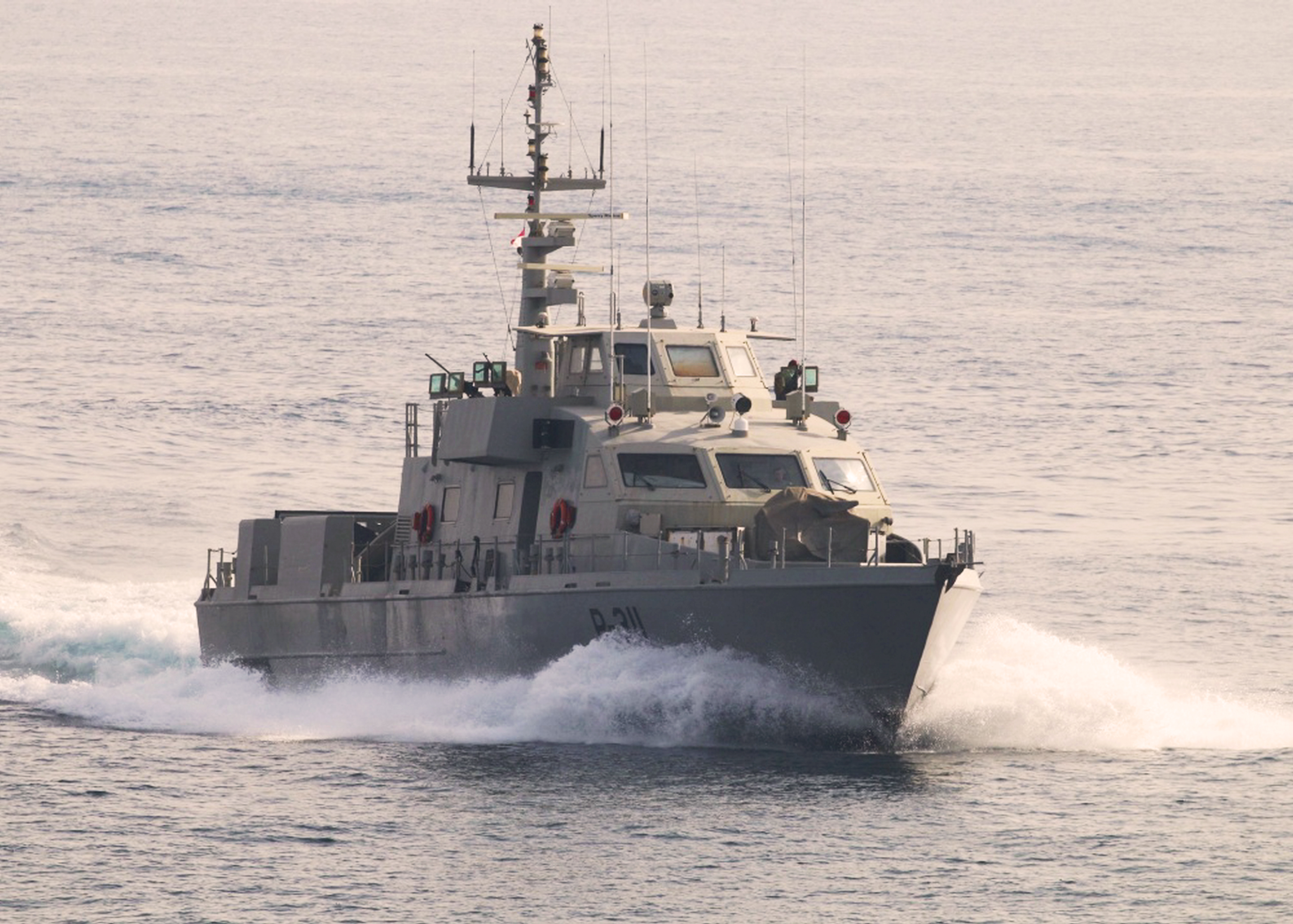
- Swift Boat (P-311)

Class overview
- Name: Swiftships Model 35PB1208 E-1455
- Builders: Swiftships
- Operators: Iraqi Navy
- In service: 2010+
- In commission: 2010+
- Planned: 12
- Building: 12
- Completed: 12
- Canceled: 0
- Active: 12

General characteristics
- Type: Patrol boat
- Length: 35.06 metres
- Beam: 7.25 metres
- Draft: 2.59 metres
- Propulsion: 3 MTU 16V2000 Marine Diesels
- Speed: Baseline speed 30 knots (56 km/h; 35 mph); Economical speed 12 knots (22 km/h; 14 mph)
- Range: 1,500 nautical miles (2,800 km; 1,700 mi) at 12 knots (22 km/h; 14 mph)
- Endurance: 6 days
- Capacity: Carries 1 x 7m Willard Rigid Inflatable Boat
- Complement: 25
- Armament: 1 × MSI 30mm DS30M Mark 2 Cannon; 1 × 50 cal/ 12.7mm MG; 2 × 7.62mm MGs
- Aircraft carried: None
- Aviation facilities: None

The Model 35PB1208 E-1455 patrol boat was ordered by the Iraqi Navy from Swiftships Shipbuilders in September 2009. The first was accepted into service in October 2010. Five others have since been delivered, the sixth in September 2011. The total order is for 12, with an option for a three more vessels.

== Order History ==
In Dec 2008 the US Defense Security Cooperation Agency announced Iraq’s formal request to buy up to 20 Coastal Patrol Boats in the 30-35 meter range, and 3 Offshore Support Vessels in the 55-60 meter range.

In July 2009 the Naval Sea Systems Command (NAVSEA) announced that Swiftships Shipbuilders would provide the Iraqi Navy with a patrol boat fleet of up to 15 Coastal Patrol Boats (CPBs).

In Sept 2009 Swiftships Shipbuilders received a $181 million contract for the detail design and construction of 9 patrol boats plus spare parts, and technical services.

In Sept 2010 the first boat, PB 301, was formally welcomed into the Iraqi Navy.

In Sept 2017, The US State Department approved the initial Foreign Military Sale (FMS) for the supply of two 35m Fast Patrol Vessels (35FPV) to Bahrain Navy. The 35m FPV’s design and technical characteristics were based on 35m Patrol Boats (PB). In Feb 2021, Bahrain Naval Forces commissioned two 35FPVs.

== Design Features ==
The hull and superstructure are constructed of all-welded aluminium alloy. The hull includes 7 watertight bulkheads forming 8 watertight compartments.

Boats can be refueled at sea using side by side procedures, and run on #2 diesel fuel.

Weather survivability includes Sea State 5 survival at the best heading, and full operational capability at Sea State 3, including 20 knots (37 km/h; 23 mph) patrol speed and 10 knots (19 km/h; 12 mph) sustained loitering speed for 12 hours.

As per original source in April 2022, the 35m PB Weather survivability includes sea state 6 survival at the best heading, and fully operational capability at sea state 4. Speed was increased to 25 knots (normal load).

== Names ==
Ship names listed and delivered:

- P-301
- P-302
- P-303
- P-304
- P-305
- P-306
- P-307
- P-308
- P-309
- P-310
- P-311
- P-312
- P-313
- P-314
- P-315
- Mashoor
- Al-Areen
