= Naval Air Station DeLand =

- IATA: none; ICAO: none

Summary
- Airport type: Military: Naval Air Station
- Operator: United States Navy
- Location: DeLand, Florida
- Built: 1942
- In use: 1942–1946
- Occupants: United States Navy
- Elevation AMSL: 70 ft (21 m)
- Coordinates: 29°03′59″N 81°17′02″W

Map
- Location within Florida

Naval Air Station DeLand was a United States Naval Air Station located in DeLand, Florida from 1942 to 1946. After the war, the airfield and associated infrastructure was redeveloped into DeLand Municipal Airport.

== History ==
The City of DeLand began developing a civilian airport in the 1920s, with the first asphalt runway laid around 1936.

In 1942, the City of DeLand donated the airport facility to the United States Navy and it was renamed Naval Air Station DeLand on 17 November. The airfield officially opened after several months of additional land acquisition and extensive military building construction. Captain Tom Turner, the air station's first commanding officer, officiated. A Navy band had not yet been formed for the air station, so the DeLand High School band played for the opening of the base. Following still more extensive military construction, NAS DeLand's primary focus became advanced training for Navy flight crews in land-based Lockheed PBO-1 Hudson, Lockheed PV-1 Ventura and Consolidated PB4Y-2 Privateer patrol bombers, as well as carrier-based Douglas SBD Dauntless dive bombers.

The first aircraft to arrive at NAS DeLand were the Hudsons, which had been transferred from Patrol Squadron 82 (VP-82) at NAS Quonset Point, Rhode Island. In addition to Quonset Point, VP-82 had previously employed these aircraft in training operations at NAS Norfolk, Virginia and detachment operations at Naval Air Station Argentia, Newfoundland and NAS Trinidad, British West Indies. This included the sinking by VP-82 of the German submarine U-656, the first U-boat sinking attributed to U.S. forces in World War II. These aircraft subsequently served as the training nucleus for PV-1 Ventura operational training units at both NAS DeLand and nearby Naval Air Station Sanford until greater numbers of newer PV-1s became available. PB4Y-2 Privateer training operations followed in 1943, with the first examples reaching operational Fleet squadrons in 1944

Between PBO-1, PV-1 and PB4Y-2 training operations, several of the U.S. Navy's former and present day maritime patrol and reconnaissance (VP) squadrons operating the Lockheed P-3 Orion and Boeing P-8 Poseidon trace their squadron lineage to being established at NAS DeLand with these earlier aircraft during World War II.

When the SBD Dauntless dive bombers began to arrive, along with pilots and crew members, Ventura training was scaled back.

Samuel Hynes, who in later life was a professor at Yale University, the author of numerous books, and a participant in documentary films made by Ken Burns, was a Marine pilot in World War II. He recounts learning to fly Dauntless dive bombers at DeLand:

The planes on the flight line were old; they had come from fleet duty . . . Like the planes, our instructors were combat veterans . . . who had been to the Pacific theater, had seen the islands, and Japanese planes in the air, had dropped real bombs on real enemy targets, and had been shot at . . . [they showed us how] to dive an airplane straight toward the earth, and to drop a bomb while diving. This is the most unnatural action possible in a plane, a kind of defiance of all life-preserving instincts . . .

In Florida in 1944 one dive-bomber pilot died every day . . .

[Off duty, when visiting Daytona Beach, there] seemed to be no laws that governed the behavior of Marine pilots . . . the police might scold, but they never arrested us.

In 1944, training operations in the Grumman F6F Hellcat carrier-based fighter also commenced at NAS DeLand, as well as an Advanced Carrier Navigation school for replacement pilots.

Because support functions often exceeded the capability of the air station's uniformed officers, sailors and Marines, many of DeLand's citizens were also employed at the base in administrative and support roles and were paid wages that were a significant improvement over those the community had seen during the recently concluded Great Depression.

=== Military training and exercises ===
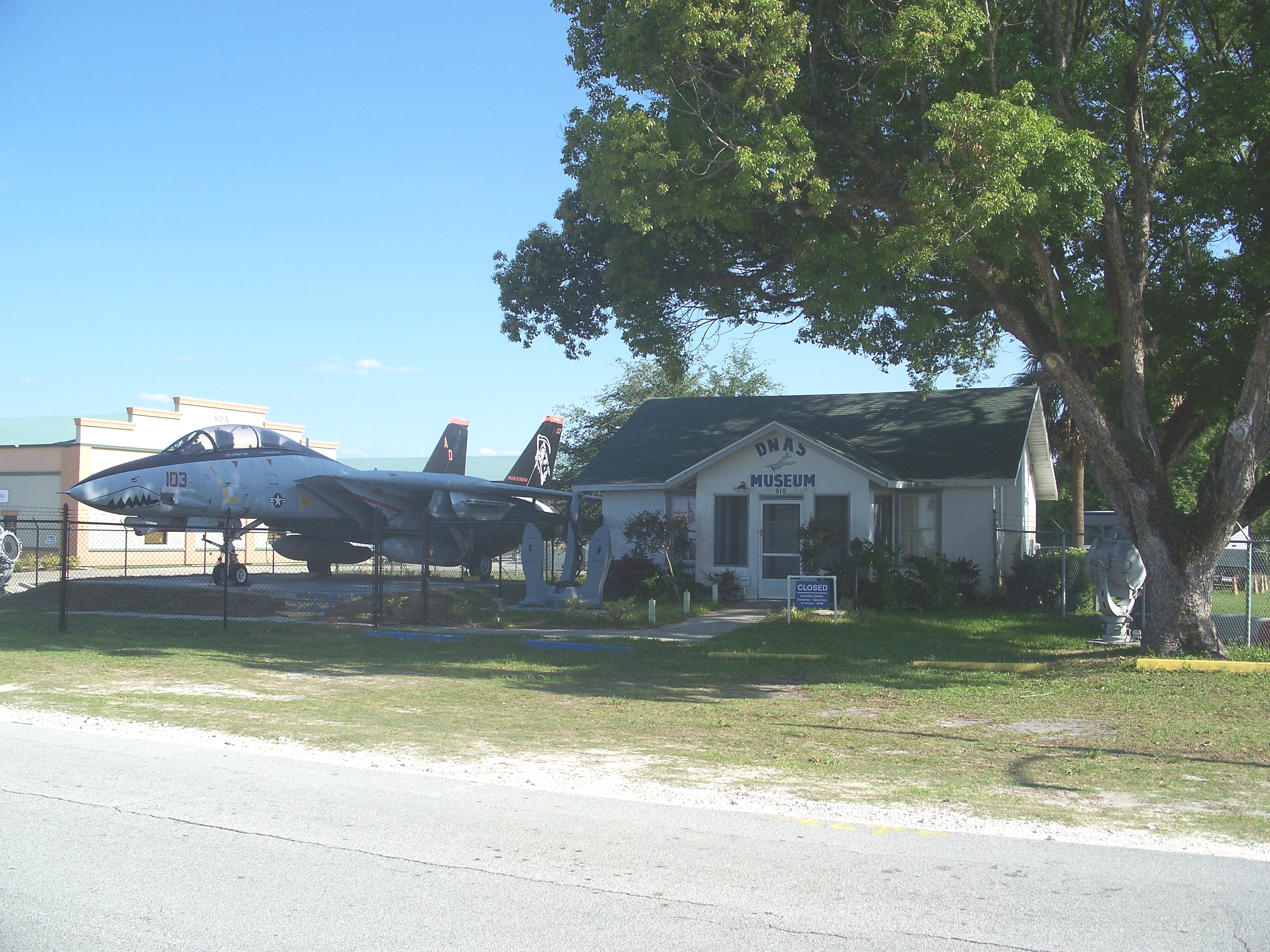
A Grumman F-14 Tomcat on a platform with the Chief Master at Arms house in the background. The house is now the location of the DeLand Naval Air Station Museum.

Nine Mile Point on Lake George was also under NAS DeLand's control and was used as a practice bombing site with a Navy Consolidated PBY Catalina seaplane stationed nearby in the event of an aircraft mishap on the lake. The Lake George site is still used today as part of the Navy's Pinecastle Electronic Warfare and Bombing Range complex in the Ocala National Forest that is managed by NAS Jacksonville. NAS DeLand also maintained a duty watch of two sailors to patrol Lake Woodruff in the event of any nearby naval aircraft mishaps.

NAS DeLand also had responsibility for Navy Outlying Field New Smyrna Beach and bombing targets near Paisley, Hawkinsville, the Indian River Lagoon, and east of Lake Dias near DeLeon Springs. These facilities were also used by aircraft based at Naval Air Station Daytona Beach and NAS Sanford.

The airfield at New Smyrna Beach refueled and rearmed aircraft practicing landings at Outlying Field Spruce Creek and conducting target practice over the Atlantic Ocean. These aircraft occasionally carried 500 pound bombs when they were over the ocean in the event any German U-boats were spotted.

=== Decommissioning ===
Following the end of World War II, the base closed as an active naval installation on 15 March 1946. Its control tower also closed and ownership of the air station returned to the City of DeLand as an uncontrolled civilian airport. After the city resumed control of the field, it became DeLand Municipal Airport, a role it continues to this day.

=== Stetson University College of Law ===
From 1946 to 1953, the base was also home to Stetson University College of Law. The law school was relocated to Gulfport (St. Petersburg), Florida, in 1954.

== DeLand Naval Air Station Museum ==
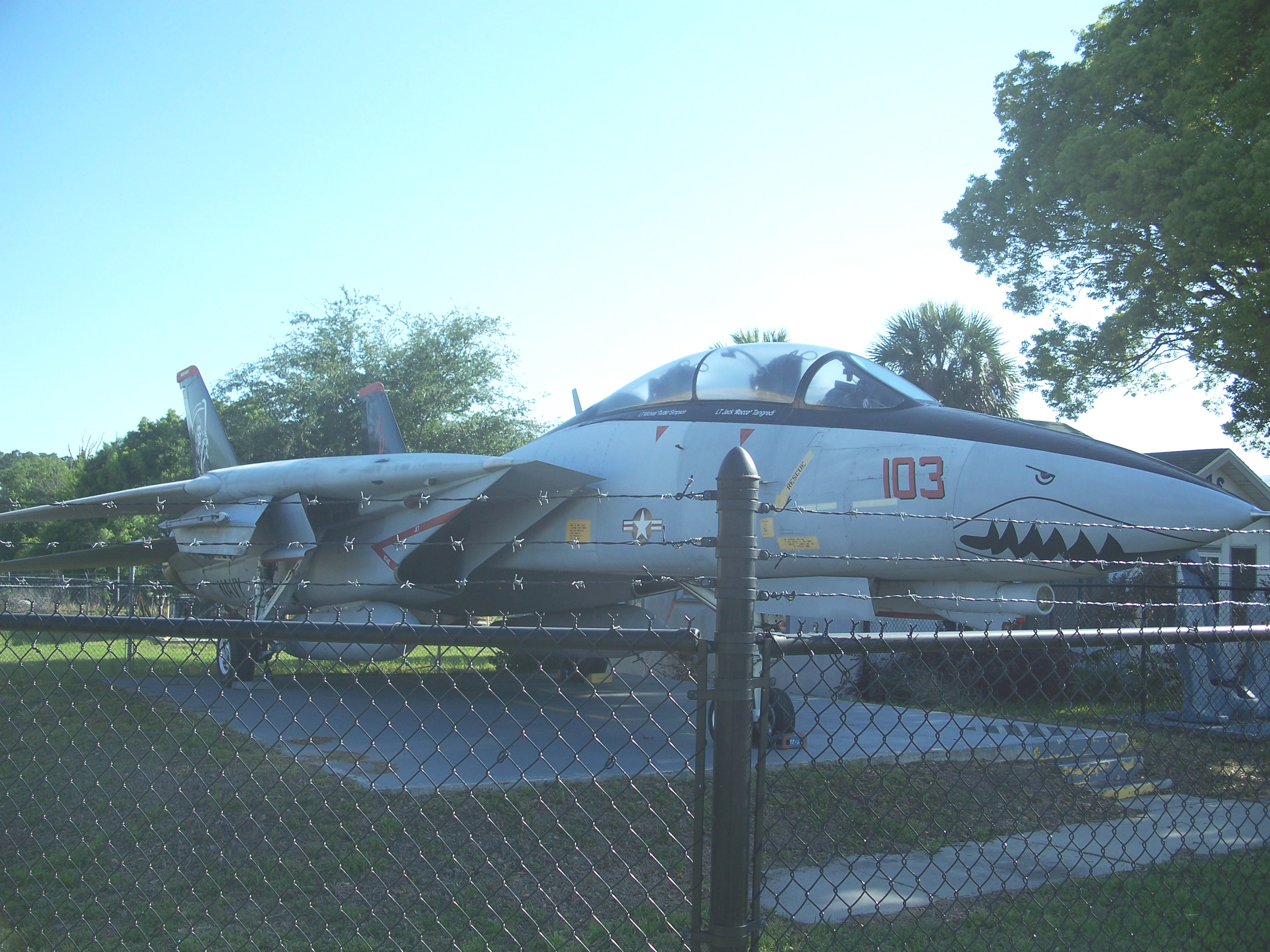
Another view of the F-14 with the museum in the background

Located in the historic Chief Master at Arms House in DeLand, Florida, the DeLand Naval Air Station Museum was dedicated in 1995 and focuses on the history of Naval Air Station DeLand, U.S. Naval Aviation, and United States Navy history. Exhibits include an F-14B Tomcat on loan from the National Naval Aviation Museum, PTF-3 (a former USN Nasty class torpedo boat undergoing restoration), a Grumman TBF Avenger torpedo bomber (undergoing restoration), a Korean War era H-13 Sioux MASH helicopter, a 1954 U.S. Army M38A1 jeep, military artifacts, vintage photographs, and other memorabilia.
