= Chief Master at Arms House =

Historic house in Florida, United States

- U.S. National Register of Historic Places
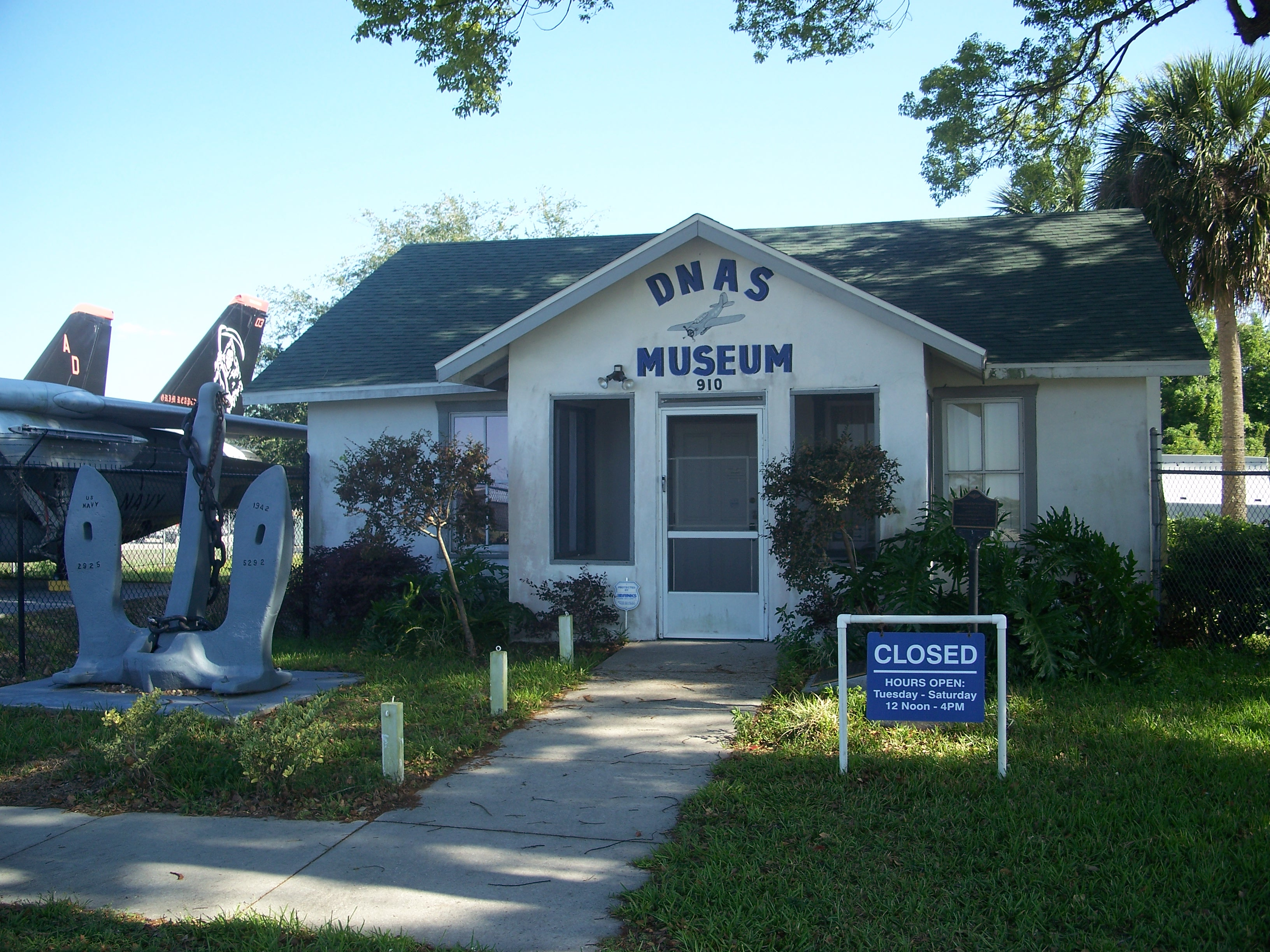
- DeLand Naval Air Station Museum

- Location within Volusia County
- Location: DeLand, Florida United States
- Coordinates: 29°3′29″N 81°17′18″W
- NRHP reference No.: 02000003
- Added to NRHP: 15 February 2002

The Chief Master at Arms House is a historic site in DeLand, Florida, United States. It is located at 910 Biscayne Boulevard. The building is the home of the DeLand Naval Air Station Museum. On February 15, 2002, it was added to the United States National Register of Historic Places.

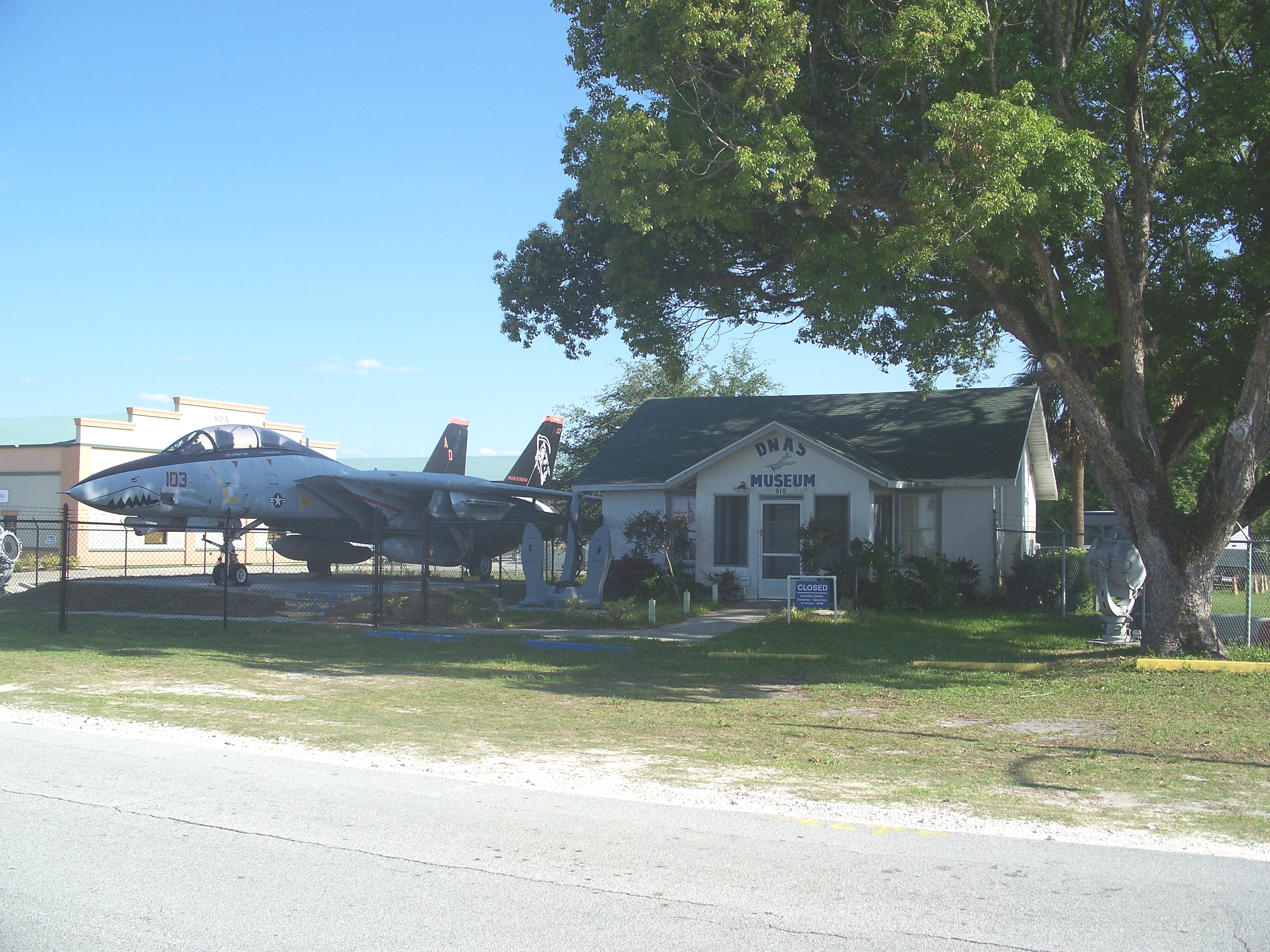
Grumman F-14 Tomcat fighter-interceptor next to museum

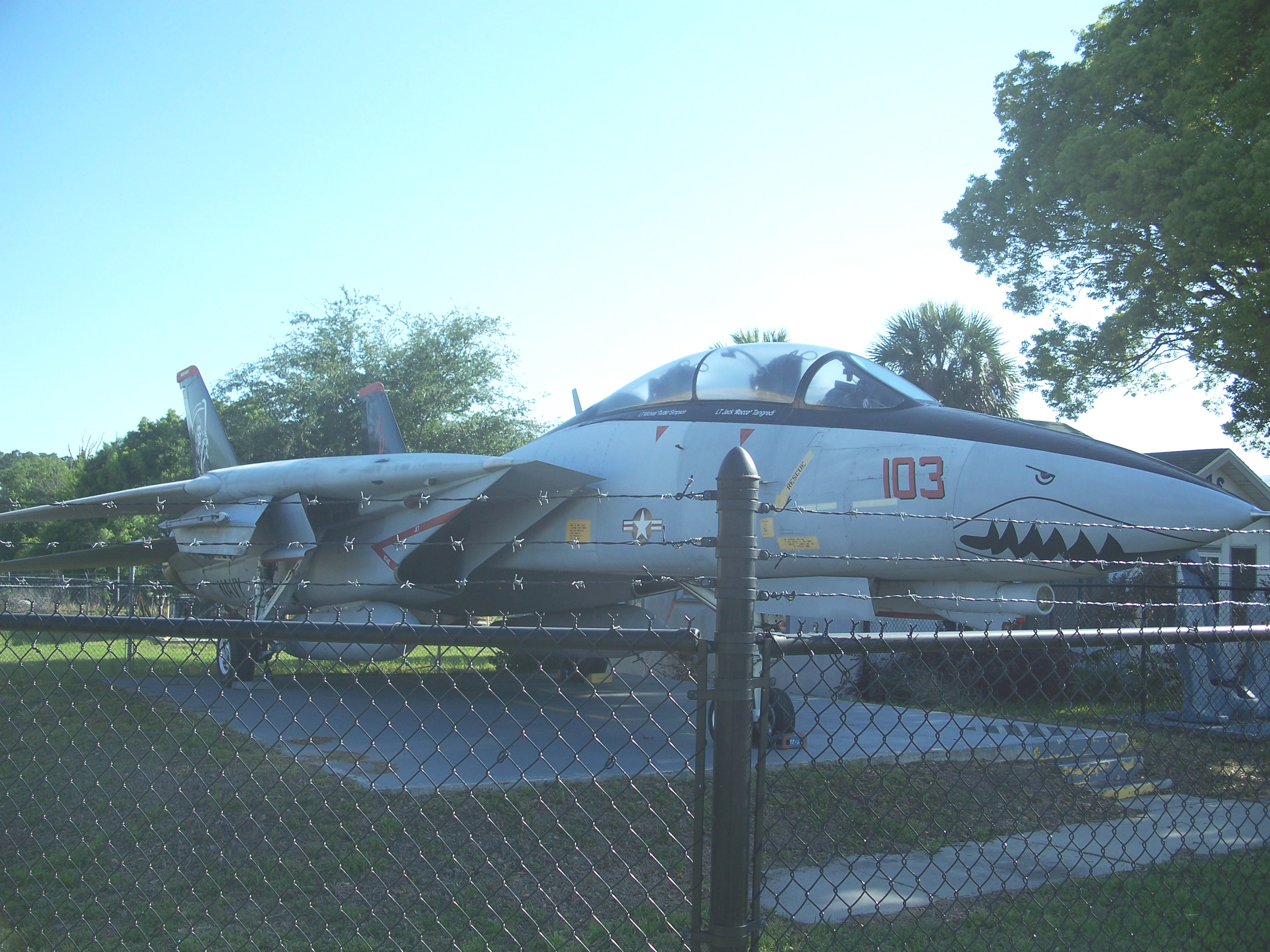
Jet and museum
