= Henry Brandon =

Henry Brandon may refer to:

- Henry Brandon, Earl of Lincoln (1523–1534)
- Henry Brandon, 2nd Duke of Suffolk (1535–1551)
- Henry Brandon (actor) (1912–1990), American character actor
- Henry Brandon, Baron Brandon of Oakbrook (1920–1999), British life peer
- Henry Brandon (journalist) (1916–1993), Czech-born British journalist
- Henry L. Brandon (1923–1997), American attorney

== See also ==
- Harry "Skip" Brandon (born 1941), former deputy assistant director in charge of counter-terrorism and national security at the Federal Bureau of Investigation
- Harry Brandon (footballer) (1870–1935), Scottish footballer
