= Harry "Skip" Brandon =

Former Deputy Assistant Director of Counterterrorism for the FBI

Harry B. Brandon
- Born: November 2, 1941 (age 85); Kansas, U.S.
- Other name: Skip Brandon
- Education: University of New Mexico; University of Texas; National War College
- Occupations: COO at Smith Brandon International, Inc.; Deputy Assistant Director of National Security and Counterterrorism at the FBI

Harry B. "Skip" Brandon (born November 2, 1941) founded Smith Brandon International, Inc. with Gene M. Smith in 1996. Smith Brandon International is a boutique corporate investigations and risk consulting firm based in Washington, D.C. Brandon is currently company COO. He is a former deputy assistant director of national security and counterterrorism for the Federal Bureau of Investigation. He retired from the FBI in 1993 after 23 years.

== Early life and education ==
Brandon is a native of Kansas. In 1964, he received his B.A. in History from the University of New Mexico. Following graduation, Brandon entered the United States Navy, where he served as a Commissioned Officer for six years, including a tour of duty in Vietnam as a Navy lieutenant on a swift boat.

In 1970, Brandon earned a Master of Arts in International Relations from the University of Texas at Austin.

== Professional career ==
=== With the FBI ===
In 1970, Brandon was appointed an FBI Special Agent. His first assignment was in Norfolk, Virginia, and then to Hartford, Connecticut. In 1975, he was transferred to San Juan, Puerto Rico, where he specialized in Cuban espionage.

In 1977, Brandon returned to Washington, D.C. to serve in the FBI Headquarters Intelligence Division. In 1982, he moved to the Madison, Wisconsin Resident Agency to serve as supervisory special agent until 1984.

Following a year at the National War College, he returned to Puerto Rico as assistant special agent in charge of the San Juan Division. He later became special agent in charge. From 1990 to 1993, when he left the Bureau, he was deputy assistant director of the FBI Headquarters Intelligence Division.

In his final FBI assignment, Brandon spent time working on projects in Poland and Russia and made frequent trips to Asia.

=== Post-FBI ===
In 1996, Brandon founded Smith Brandon International with former CIA agent Gene M. Smith. The firm specializes in business intelligence, risk assessment, and litigation support. Brandon is currently COO of the company.

In 1996, on one of his first assignments, Brandon traveled to Philippines island of Mindanao to negotiate a deal for his client, a North American mining company, with a rebel guerrilla group. The client had come into conflict with the group, threatening its future operations. Brandon's meetings with the rebels were successful at securing his client's interests. Various news sources picked up the story, involving face-to-face descriptions of his meetings with the rebels armed with machine guns in remote parts of the jungle.

== Personal life ==
Brandon is fluent in Spanish.

He has appeared on various television and radio news programs, such as ABC News and NPR, to discuss counter-terrorism. He has contributed to various industry periodicals, such as the Harvard Business Review and The Economist.
