= PTF-3 =

Patrol boat built in 1962

Coordinates: 29°03′59″N 81°17′02″W

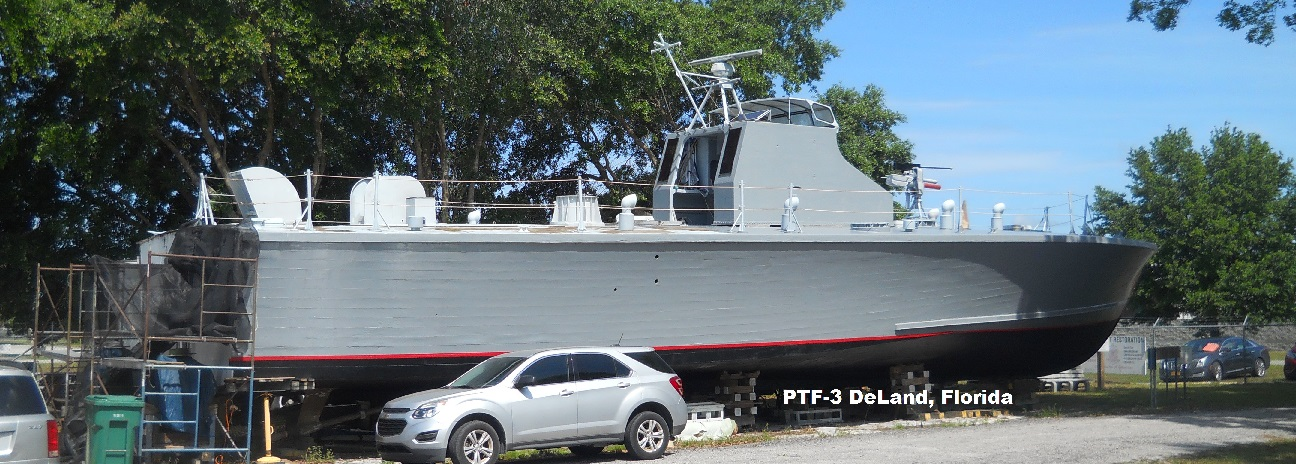
- PTF-3 Nasty Class Patrol Boat in Deland, Florida in 2022

History
- Owner: 1962 - 1966 United States Navy - Vietnam; 1966 - 1970 South Vietnamese Navy; 1970 - 1977 US Navy Diver Training Facility at Key West, FL.; 1978 - 2001 Docked in South Florida unused; 2001 - 2003 PTF 3 Restoration Project Inc.- Sea Scout; 2003 - current DeLand Naval Air Station Museum
- Builder: Westermoen Båtbyggeri, Mandal, Norway
- Completed: 1962
- Commissioned: December 1962
- Decommissioned: 1977
- In service: 1962 - 1977
- Nickname(s): Fast and Nasty
- Status: Museum ship at DeLand Naval Air Station Museum, DeLand, Florida

General characteristics
- Type: Patrol boat, Nasty-class
- Displacement: 80 long tons (81 t)
- Length: 80 ft 4 in (24.49 m)
- Beam: 24 ft 7 in (7.49 m)
- Draft: 3 ft 10 in (1.17 m)
- Propulsion: 1962 - 1978 2 × Napier Deltic Turboblown diesel engines, 6,200 bhp (4,623 kW); 1978 - current no engines
- Speed: 38 knots (70 km/h; 44 mph)
- Complement: 17 men
- Armament: 1 × Bofors 40 mm gun; 2 × 20 mm gun; 1 × "Piggyback" 81 mm mortar; 1 x 0.50 machine gun

PTF-3 is United States Nasty-class patrol boat, now a museum ship at the DeLand Naval Air Station Museum, DeLand, Florida. PTF-3 is called Fast and Nasty. PTF-3 was built in 1962 by the Westermoen Båtbyggeri in Mandal, Norway. PTF-3 is small river gunboat built with an aluminium hull. The United States Navy used PTF-3 in the Vietnam War from 1962 to 1966 in the Brown-water navy. PTF-3 has a top speed of speed of 38 knots (70 km/h; 44 mph). She is a Nasty-class patrol boat (PTF-3 to PTF 22) at 80 ft 4 in (24.49 m) long. PTF Boats replace the wooden World War II PT boats. The PTF-3 was armed with two Oerlikon 20 mm cannon, .50 caliber Browning machine gun and 81mm mortar "Piggyback".

== History ==
PTF 3 and PTF-4 were delivered to the U.S. Navy in 1963 at Little Creek, Virginia. The two boats were tested at Little Creek. Training on the boat started on May 3, 1963, at Naval Base Coronado. PTF 3 and PTF-4 departed Coronado on September 17 loaded on USS Point Defiance) a Landing Ship Dock ship. Point Defiance took the boats to Pearl Harbor, Hawaii and then to U.S. Naval Base Subic Bay in the Philippines. At Subic Bay the boats were upgraded and then shipped to Ðà Nẵng Vietnam on the USS Carter Hall. But PTF-3 suffered major damage to its hull during loading and was repaired at Subic Bay arriving at Ðà Nẵn February, 1964. PTF 3 became a Spook Boat, operated by MAC V SOG, Maritime Special Ops. PTF 3 was one of 6 PTF boats that did raids in North Vietnam, attacking shore installations and landing special operations teams. PTF-3 took part in the 1964 Tonkin Gulf Incident and had mission in Vietnam 9 years. On July 31, 1964 PTF-3 and other boats took part in landing two teams of South Vietnamese commandos on the North Vietnamese held small island of Hon Me, the start of the Tonkin Gulf incident, that lead to the Tonkin Gulf Resolution. In 1966 she was transferred to the South Vietnamese Navy. In 1970 she was returned to US Navy and had missions in Cuba and Nicaragua working with the CIA based in Diver Training Facility at Key West Florida. In 1977 she was remove from the US Navy and sold in 1978. From 1978 to 2001 she was docked in South Florida unused with no engines. In December 2001 she started used as Sea Scout ship in Orange City, Florida, purchased in Fort Lauderdale, Florida (without engines) by Bill Norton of General Propulsion who donated the boat to Boy Scout Troop 544 in December 2001. Troop 544 started a non- profit, 501c3 corporation: PTF 3 Restoration Project, Inc, to handle the restoration. In May 2003 PTF-3 was moves to DeLand Naval Air Station Museum for restoration, arriving on 29 July 2003 with honor guard of Veterans.

== Gallery ==
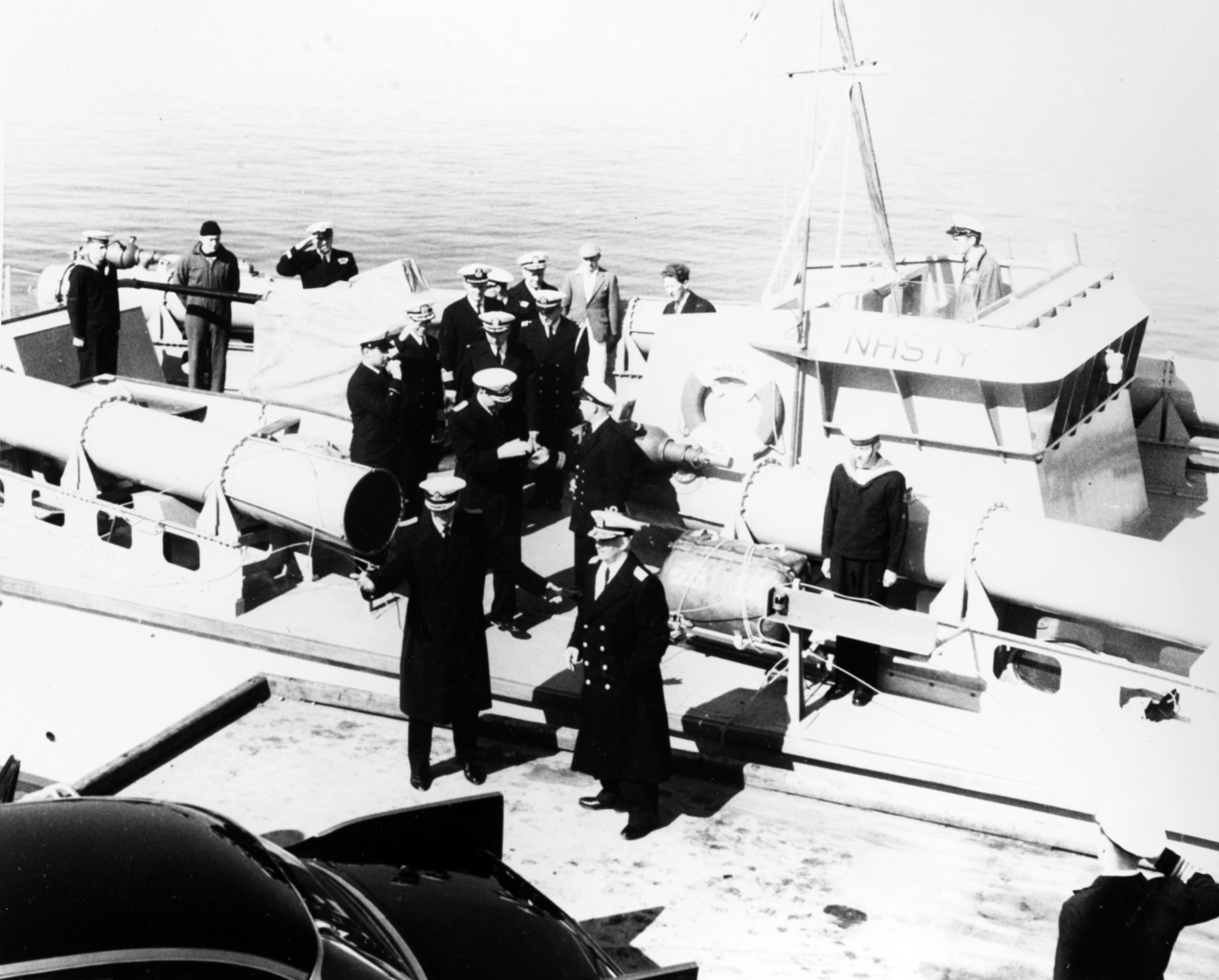
Royal Norwegian Navy motor torpedo boat in 1960

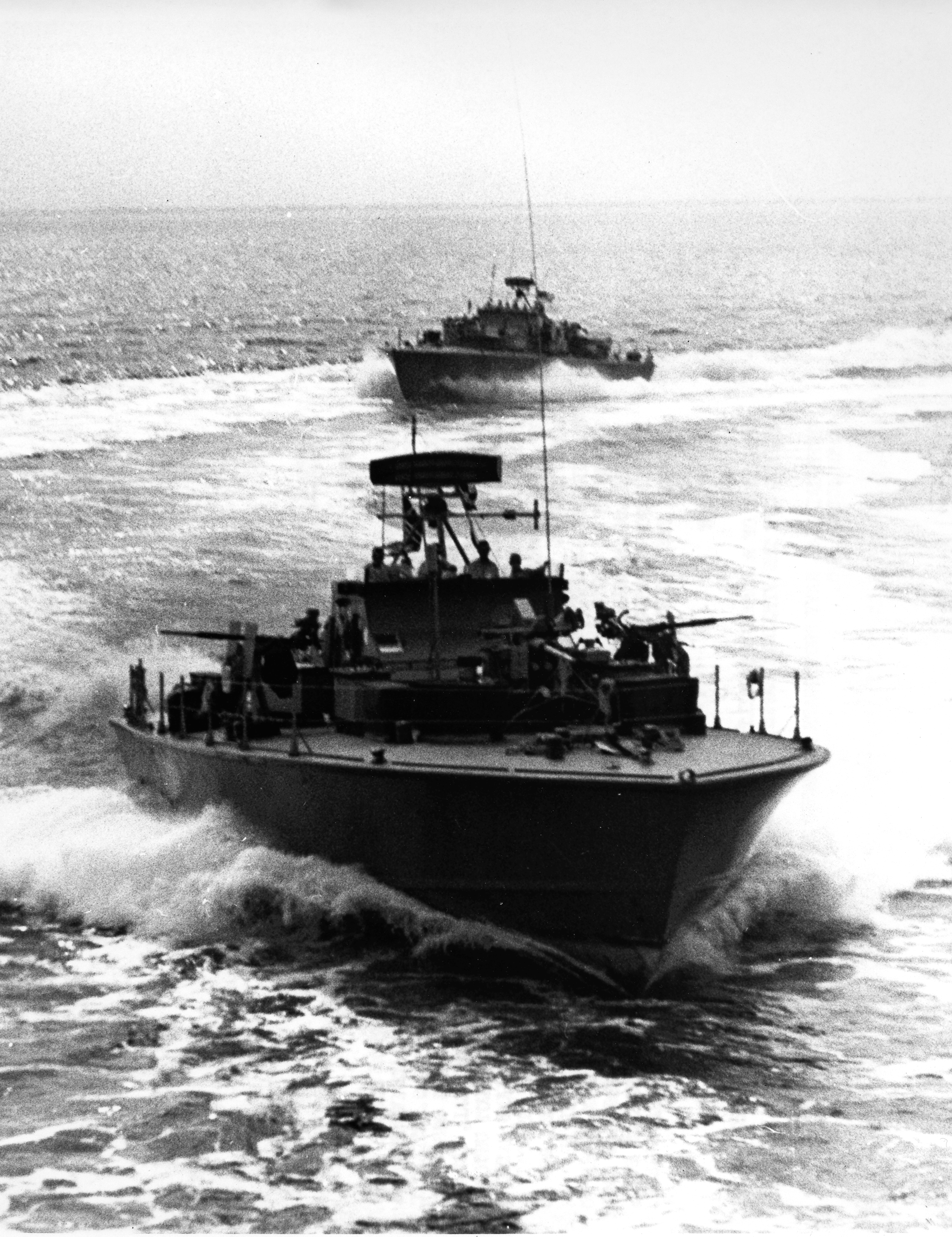
U.S. Navy PTF boats traveling at high speed during trials off the Virginia Capes in May 1963

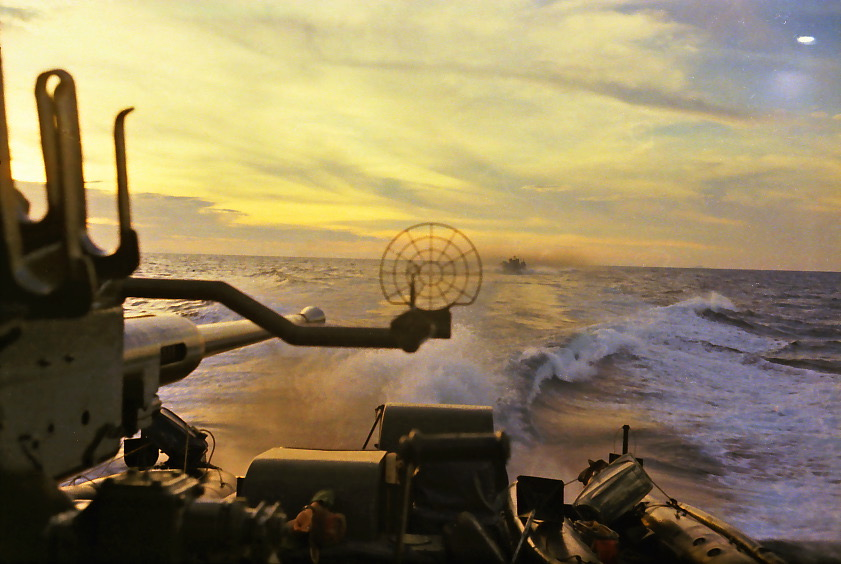
PTFs in 1971

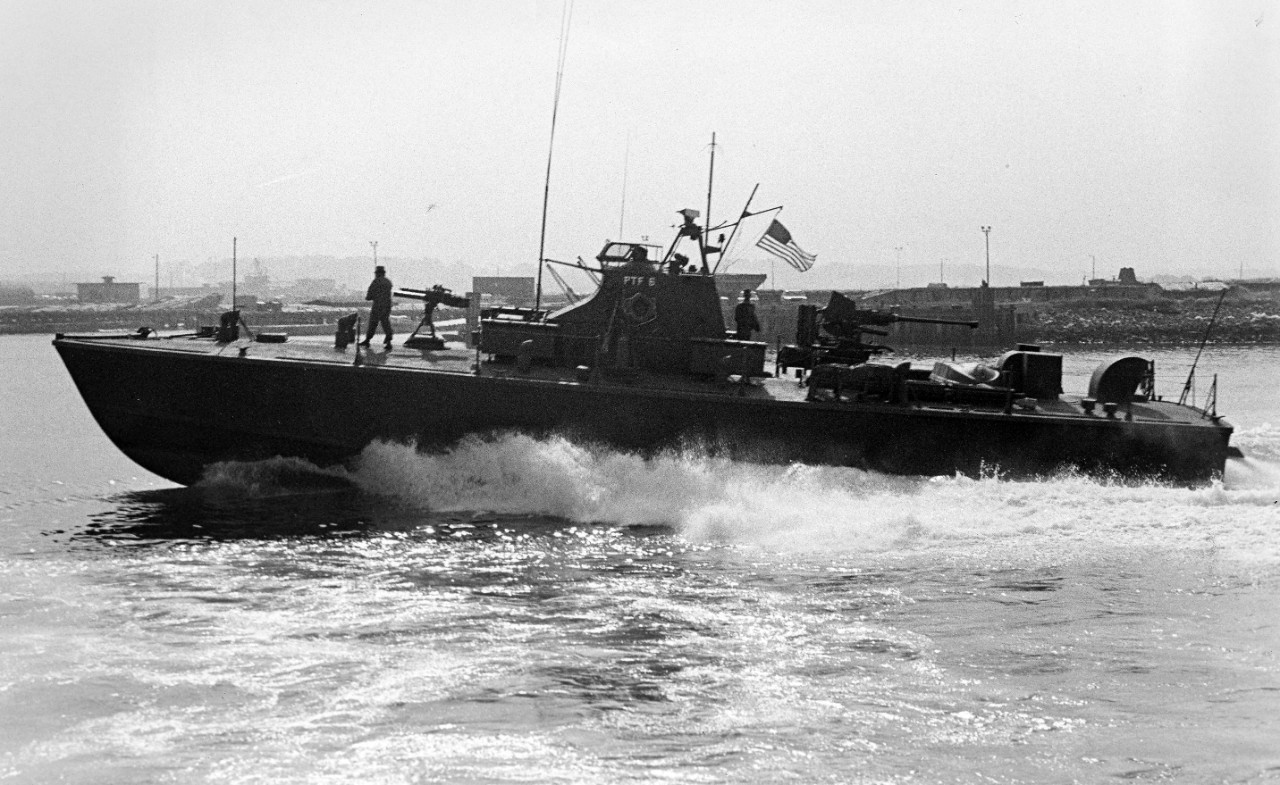
PTF-3 sister ship PTF-5 in Chesapeake Bay, in 1973

== See also ==
- List of museum ships in North America
