= Swiftships =

American shipbuilding and marine engineering company

Swiftships is a shipbuilding and marine engineering company headquartered in the Port of South Louisiana, United States. The company operates globally and specialized in the construction of small to medium sized vessels made of steel, aluminum or fiberglass. Swiftships is involved in ship design, construction, repair and maintenance activities.

== History ==
Founded by Fred Sewart in 1942, Swiftships began as Sewart Machine Works and then as Sewart Seacraft in 1946. The company became a supplier of "Swift Boats" to the US Navy during the Vietnam War (Swiftships delivered 193 Fast Patrol Crafts to the US Navy throughout the conflict). The mission objective of the Swift Boat was to provide the Navy with a fast boat that could patrol the river shores for enemy soldiers.

In 1969 the company was renamed as Swiftships.

Since 2004 and for the next years, Swiftships built ships for the oil and gas industry of the Gulf of Mexico and restored vessels for the Dominican Republic.

The company created its first fully unmanned surface vehicle in 2015, called Anaconda (AN-1), and later the Anaconda (AN-2), for which Swiftships teamed with the University of Louisiana at Lafayette and augmented technology developers.

Since 1942 Swiftships has designed and built over 600 naval vessels and commercial platforms.

In March 2026, Swiftships filed for Chapter 11 bankruptcy protection, listing assets and liabilities between $10 million and $50 million.

=== Co-production ===
In 2008 the company signed a contract with the Egyptian Navy, initiating a co-production program, building vessels in-country. The partnership includes a yard in Alexandria, where the company produces patrol crafts.

In 2009, Swiftships was awarded a contract by the U.S. Navy to provide Follow on Technical Support on behalf of the Iraqi Navy that included the establishment of a Ship Repair Facility in Umm Qasr, Iraq.

=== Yards ===
In 2020, Swiftships operates three yards in the US and one co-production yard (JV) with the Egyptian Navy in Alexandria, Egypt:

- Morgan City, Louisiana
- New Iberia, Jeanerette, Louisiana
- Freeport, Texas
- Egyptian Shipyard Repair Building Co. - partnership with the Egyptian Navy to co-produce Swift vessels in Egypt under an approved MLA by the United States government.

== Products ==
Ship types include:

- Fast Patrol Vessels: company supplied vessels to Iraq (Swiftships Model 35PB1208 E-1455), Bahrain, US governments and other.
- Landing Craft: company has long-term agreement with a US government to build up to 32 new series LCU 1700 Class.
- Corvettes: Swiftships started a program with the Pakistan Navy to build multi-purpose naval platforms, 75 meter corvette, for security and high threat missions.
- Fast Supply Vessels: to Rodi Marine and other commercial groups.
- Unmanned Surface Vessels- Anaconda (AN-2)
