= Nasty-class patrol boat =

Nasty-class patrol boat can refer to:

- United States Nasty-class patrol boat
- German Nasty-class patrol boat
- Turkish Nasty-type patrol boat
- Greek Tjeld-type patrol boat, also known as Nasty-class

== See also ==
- HNoMS Nasty, prototype
- Nasty-type patrol boat
- Tjeld-class patrol boat, Norwegian Nasty type vessels
