= Toralf Westermoen =

Norwegian politician

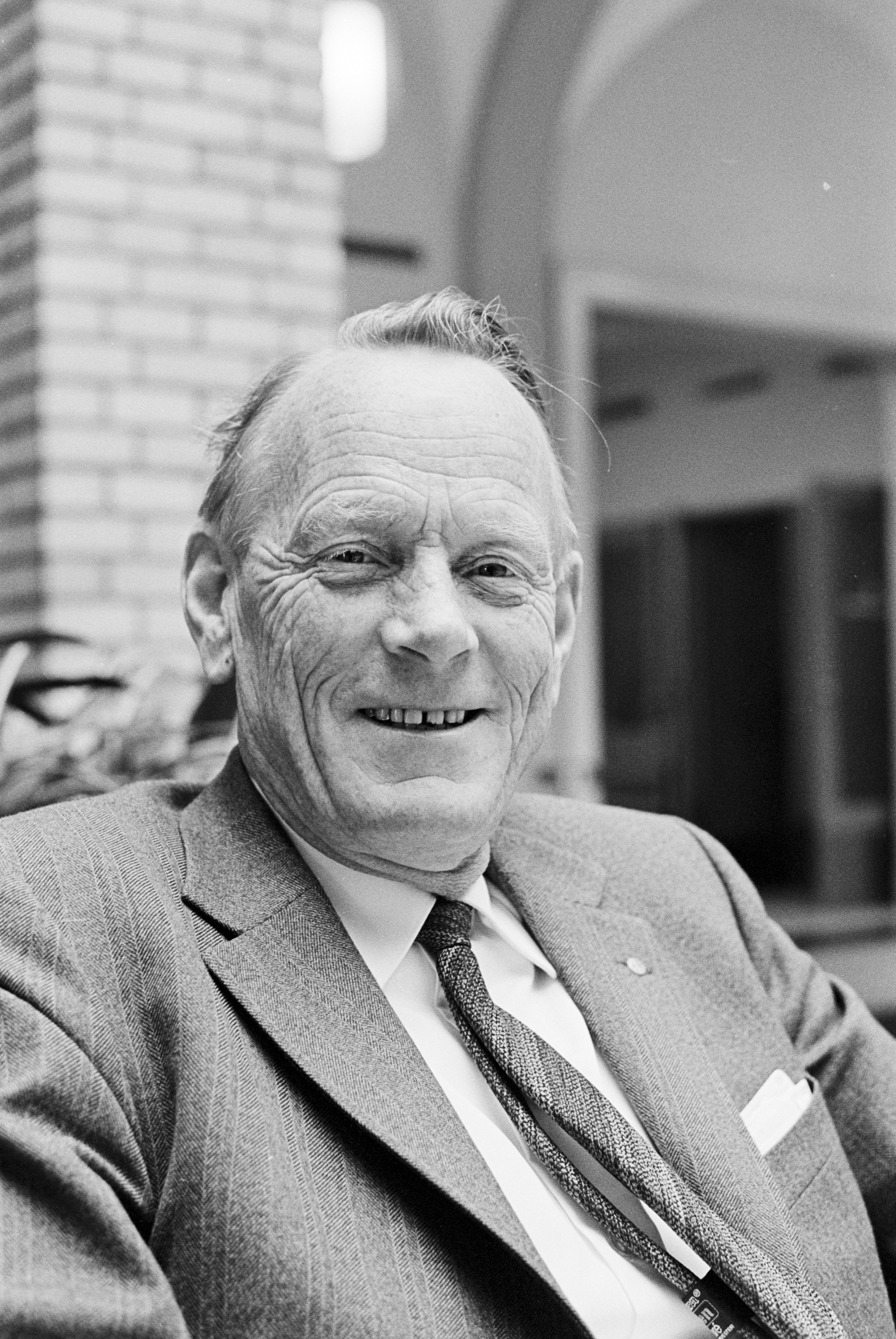
Toralf Westermoen

Toralf Westermoen (July 5, 1914 – May 6, 1986) was a pioneer for the development of high speed craft in Norway. Westermoen was involved in the companies Båtservice Verft, Westermoen Båtbyggeri og Mek. Verksted , Westermoen Hydrofoil and Westamarin , all situated in Mandal.

On his own initiative, Westermoen started development of a high speed motor-torpedo vessel early in the 1950s. The prototype, Nasty was the start of the Tjeld class patrol boat that was put into production in 1957. The top speed was around 45 knots. Jan Herman Linge was the main designer for Westermoens from 1949 to 1956.

The Nasty/Tjeld-class was in continuous production until 1970, and in addition to sales to the Norwegian navy, it was exported to Germany, Greece, Turkey and the United States.

In the period 1965 to 1970, Westermoen Hydrofoil built 6 Storm class patrol boats. The Storm class we used as the basis for the Westamaran catamaran, which was essentially a Storm-class hull divided in the middle and separated to form a much wider catamaran, suited for passenger transport.

The first generation Westamaran catamarans were not as quick as the competing hydrofoils, but their capacity was larger, maintenance easier, and they were more comfortable. The second generation catamarans, with symmetrical hulls, matched the hydrofoils in speed, reaching 35-40 knots.

Toralf Westermoen was CEO in the various companies until 1969 when he was elected to the Norwegian parliament for Kristelig Folkeparti, where he served until 1981.

The technology and heritage that Westermoen initiated, lives on in the company Umoe Mandal, who are building third generation catamaran craft that also includes SES-technology, such as the Skjold class patrol boats.

His son Thore Westermoen also became involved in politics.
