= Westermoen =

Westermoen may refer to:

- Thore Westermoen (born 1949), Norwegian politician for the Christian Democratic Party
- Toralf Westermoen (1914–1986), pioneer for the development of high speed craft in Norway
- Westermoen Båtbyggeri og Mek Verksted, shipyard located in Mandal, Norway, who specialized in high speed craft
- Westermoen Hydrofoil, shipyard in Mandal, Norway, specialising in high speed craft
