= German Nasty-class patrol boat =

Class overview
- Name: Nasty class
- Operators: German Navy
- Built: 1960
- In commission: 1960–1964
- Completed: 2

General characteristics
- Type: Patrol boat
- Displacement: 64.8 long tons (66 t) (standard) 75.5 long tons (77 t) (full load)
- Length: 24.5 m (80 ft 5 in)
- Beam: 7.5 m (24 ft 7 in)
- Draught: 1.1 m (3 ft 7 in)
- Propulsion: 2 × Napier Deltic diesel engines, 6,280 bhp (4,683 kW) 2 × shaft
- Speed: 45 knots (52 mph; 83 km/h)
- Complement: 34 men
- Armament: 2 × Bofors 40 mm gun; 4 × 21 in (533 mm) torpedo tubes

For other ship classes of the same name see Nasty-type patrol boat

The German Nasty class, also known as the Hugin class, were a set of two fast patrol boats built for the post-war German Navy to a Norwegian design and purchased in the 1960s for evaluation purposes. In 1964, they were transferred to Turkey.

== Service history ==
Following the end of World War II and during German re-armament in the Cold War era, the German Navy (Bundesmarine) had built a number of fast attack craft classes, mostly developments of the war-time Schnellboot design. However, in the 1960s, the German Navy was interested in the possibilities of a different hull shape, for use in narrow coastal waters. To this end, they ordered two vessels from the Norwegian company Båtservice Verft, of Mandal, which had already designed a hard-chined planing hull for its prototype fast patrol boat, the Nasty.

The two boats were built in 1960 and commissioned under the names Hugin and Munin, after the ravens of Norse mythology. They were designated the Nasty-Klasse & SchnellbootTyp 152.

The two vessels remained in service for four years, but the design/experiment was not a success, so the Bundesmarine disposed of the boats by transferring them to the Turkish Navy in 1964.

== List of vessels ==
Name	Pennant number	Date of launch	Builder	Notes
Hugin ("Thought")	P6191	26 March 1960	Båtservice Verft	To Turkey, August 1964
Munin ("Memory")	P6192	26 June 1960	Båtservice Verft	To Turkey, August 1964
