= MV Mariam =

History
- Name: Venture 84, Trident, renamed Trident III in 1986
- Owner: Emeraude Lines
- Port of registry: France
- Route: Channel Islands — France
- Builder: Westermoen Hydrofoil
- Completed: 1982
- In service: April 1983
- Out of service: 1996
- Identification: IMO number: 8205694
- Fate: Sold to Fergün Denizcilik
- Prior to 1996, the ship mainly served the Saint-Malo to Saint Helier route
- Name: Fergün Express III
- Owner: Fergün Denizcilik
- Port of registry: Turkey
- Route: Northern Cyprus
- Acquired: 1996
- Out of service: August 2009
- Identification: IMO number: 8205694
- Name: Junia Star or Jounieh Star; later Ladi Faten
- Out of service: 2010
- Identification: IMO number: 8205694; MMSI Number 720624000; Callsign CPA860
- Name: Mariam or St. Mariam
- Port of registry: Bolivia
- In service: August 2010
- Identification: IMO number: 8205694
- Status: In service

General characteristics
- Class & type: Westamaran W95 catamaran
- Tonnage: 228 GT; 83 NT
- Length: 29.00 m (95 ft 2 in)
- Beam: 8.00 m (26 ft 3 in)
- Depth: 3.1 meters
- Propulsion: two 1800 hp main engines
- Speed: 28 knots
- Capacity: approximately 200 passengers

MV Mariam is a Bolivian-flagged passenger ferry with a 228 gross tonnage (GT). Built in 1982 at Westermoen Hydrofoil shipyard, the ship is a catamaran 29.00 metres (95 ft 2 in) in length with a capacity of about 200 passengers. Built as Venture 84, the ship was in service with the French ferry operator Emeraude Lines from 1983 to 1996, serving a route between the Channel Islands and France. From 1996 to 2008, the ship was operated by Cypriot ferry operator Fergün Denizcilik as Fergün Express III.

As of 2010, the ship is Lebanese-owned and operated as medical aid cargo ship which, in August 2010, was intended to sail to the Gaza Strip to break Israel's four-year blockade of Gaza.

== Design and construction ==
The ship, built as Venture 84, is a Westamaran W95 catamaran. The Westamaran line was designed by Herald Heinriksen of Westermoen Hydrofoil of Mandal, Norway. Featuring asymmetrical hulls, the Westamaran models were designed as a replacement for hydrofoils, and were considered more seaworthy in Norwegian waters and easier to operate than hydrofoils. The immediate predecessor of the W95, the W86, has been called a "breakthrough" for high-speed craft in Norway, and according to Bjørn Foss of More and Romsdal College, Westamaran catamarans "dominated the fast ferry market in Norway" for several years. Westmaran ships have seen use world-wide.

The W95 has a maximum cruising speed of 28 knots, powered by two 1800 horsepower main engines that consume up to 625 litres of fuel per hour.

== History ==
Venture 84 entered service as a vessel of the French ferry operator Emeraude Lines in April 1983, and was renamed Trident. While Emeraude Lines would go on to operate several W95 ferries, Trident had the distinction of being the only ship the company ever bought new from the builder. The company's advertising mentioned the ship's "large air-conditioned passenger saloon with a panoramic view and bar". Trident was used mainly for the route from Saint Malo to Saint Helier, on a 70-minute schedule with a daytrip fare of 195 French Francs. In 1986, the ship was renamed Trident III, often written Trident 3. The ship continued the Channel Islands-France service until 1996 when it was purchased by ferry operator Fergün Denizcilik of Kyrenia, Cyprus.

Renamed Fergün Express III, the ship joined a ferry service that had been operating since 1986. In January 2008 the ship was withdrawn from its class at the Türk Loydu classification society for reasons including an overdue survey. In August 2009, the ship was purchased by shipowner Ghassan El Assaad el Bakri of Tripoli, Lebanon and renamed Ladi Faten. In August 2010, it was sold to "undisclosed interests", reflagged under the Cambodian flag of convenience, and renamed Jounieh Star. The ship has recently been registered under the Bolivian and Jordanian flags.

=== As Mariam ===
As of 2010 the ship is known as Mariam or St. Mariam. It is currently a Lebanese medical aid cargo ship which, in August 2010, was intended to sail to the Gaza Strip to break Israel's four-year blockade of Gaza. It sails under the Bolivian flag. The ship carries 50 women, mostly from Lebanon, but also a group of American nuns. Its actions are coordinated by Lebanese lawyer Samar al Hajj. According to The Guardian, the women on board have all adopted the ship's name and call themselves "Mariam."

Its first mission, in late August 2010, was delayed because Cyprus would not allow it (and its sister ship the Naji Alali) to sail through its waters; because Lebanon is still officially at war with Israel, the ship cannot go to Gaza directly from Lebanon and would have to sail through a third country. Israeli Minister of Foreign Affairs Avigdor Lieberman was unequivocal in his insistence that the Mariam not reach Gaza: "Our position is absolutely clear and firm – under no conditions or provocations can any flotilla or ship harm our country's political independence and reach the Gaza Strip."

As of September 2010, representatives of the Mariam voyage are in talks with Greece to use a Greek port for departure to Gaza.
