= Greek Tjeld-type patrol boat =

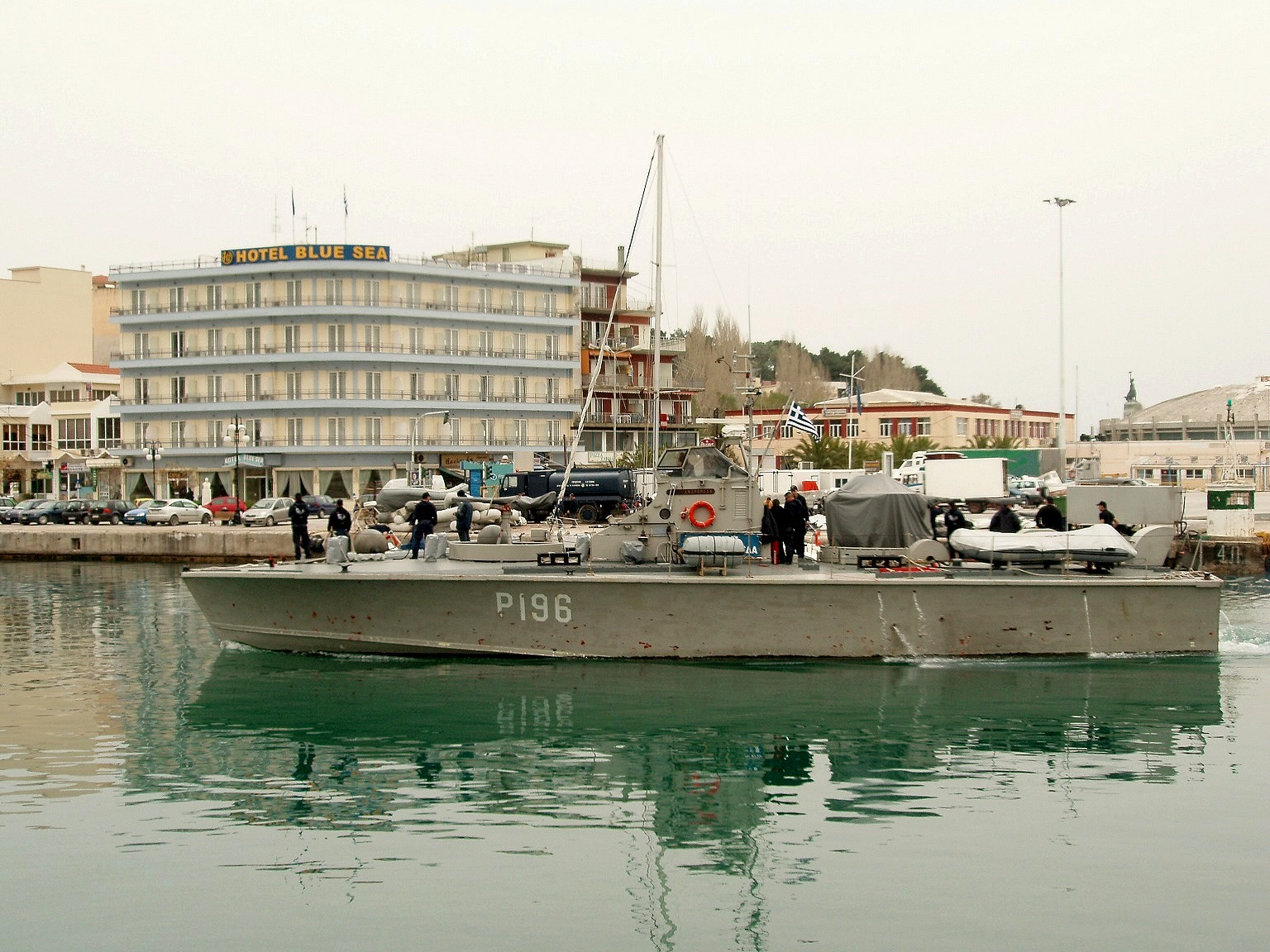
- Tjeld-type patrol boat Andromeda, March 2008, in Mitilini harbour

Class overview
- Operators: Hellenic Navy
- Built: 1965–1967
- In commission: 1967–1985 (Thereafter, four converted from motor torpedo boat to motor gunboat configuration for coastal defence.)
- Completed: 6

General characteristics
- Type: Patrol boat
- Displacement: 70 long tons (71 t)(standard) 76 long tons (77 t) (full load)
- Length: 24.5 m (80 ft 5 in)
- Beam: 7.5 m (24 ft 7 in)
- Draught: 2.1 m (6 ft 11 in)
- Propulsion: 2 × Napier Deltic Turbo-charged diesel engines, 6,200 hp (4,623 kW) 2 × shafts
- Speed: 45 knots (52 mph; 83 km/h)
- Range: 450nm at 40kn, 1600nm at 25kn
- Complement: 22 men
- Armament: 2 × Bofors 40 mm gun 4 × 21 in (533 mm) torpedo tubes

The Greek Tjeld type patrol boats were a set of six fast patrol boats built to a Norwegian design and operated by the Hellenic Navy during the 1960s & early 1970s.

== Construction ==
The six vessels were built by the Norwegian company Westermoen of Mandal, Norway, to the same design as that of the Tjeld class patrol boats built by Westermoen for the Royal Norwegian Navy in 1959. This was, in turn, based on their prototype fast patrol boat, the Nasty, and the Greek vessels are also described as the "Improved Nasty type". Other sources give the names "Nasty-type" & "Nasty-class" patrol boats.

The vessels were ordered in 1965, identical to the Tjeld boats except they had two 40mm guns instead of the single 40mm & 20mm guns of the Tjeld boats. They were delivered in 1967 and commissioned with astronomical names. They were the first warships built for the Greek Navy since the 1930s.

== Service history ==
The six vessels remained in service until the 1980s. In 1982, Iniohos was discarded and the remaining vessels were re-numbered P196-200 (inclusive); all were decommissioned & placed in reserve or sold in 1983.

In 1989, four boats were re-engined and re-activated, but, by 1995, all of these had been disposed of.

== List of vessels ==
Name	Pennant number	Builder	Date of launch	Notes
Andromeda (gk) ("Andromeda")	P21	Westermoen	1965	renumbered P196 in 1982, decommissioned 1983. re-engined 1989, stricken 1985. In-service as of 23 March 2008.
Iniohos (gk) ("the Charioteer")	P22	Westermoen	1965	stricken 1982
Kastor (gk) ("Castor")	P23	Westermoen	1965	renumbered P197 in 1982, stricken 1983
Kyknos (gk) ("the Swan")	P24	Westermoen	1965	renumbered P198 in 1982, decommissioned 1983. re-engined 1989, stricken 1985. In-service?
Pigasos (gk) ("Pegasus")	P25	Westermoen	1965	renumbered P199 in 1982, decommissioned 1983. re-engined 1989, stricken 1985. In-service?
Toxotis (gk) ("the Archer")	P26	Westermoen	1965	renumbered P200 in 1982, decommissioned 1983. re-engined 1989, stricken 1985. In-service?

== Notes ==
- Toxotis, Andromeda, Kiknos, and Pigasos are still in service at Patrol duty in the Eastern Aegean islands. Re-engined with 2 MTU each & 2 fiat iveco engines and armed with 1 40mm bofors & 1 20mm Oerlikon. No torpedo tubes in usage at the moment
