= Turkish Nasty-type patrol boat =

Class overview
- Name: Nasty type patrol boat
- Operators: Turkish Navy
- Built: 1960
- In commission: 1964–1973
- Completed: 2

General characteristics
- Type: Patrol boat
- Displacement: 64.8 long tons (66 t) (standard) 75.5 long tons (77 t) (full load)
- Length: 24.5 m (80 ft 5 in)
- Beam: 7.5 m (24 ft 7 in)
- Draught: 1.1 m (3 ft 7 in)
- Propulsion: 2 × Napier Deltic diesel engines, 6,280 bhp (4,683 kW) 2 × shaft
- Speed: 45 knots (52 mph; 83 km/h)
- Complement: 34 men
- Armament: 2 × Bofors 40 mm gun; 4 × 21 in (533 mm) torpedo tubes

For other ship classes of the same name see Nasty-type patrol boat

The Turkish Nasty type patrol boats were a set of two fast patrol boats operated by the Turkish Navy during the 1960s and early 1970s.

== Construction ==
The two vessels were originally built in Norway for the post-war German Navy, being purchased in the 1960s for evaluation purposes. They were built by the Norwegian company Båtservice Verft, of Mandal, to a design based on their prototype fast patrol boat, the Nasty. At the end of the evaluation period, the German Navy released them in 1964 for transfer to the Turkish navy as military aid.

== Service history ==
The two boats were commissioned into the Turkish Navy in 1964 as Doğan ("Falcon") & Martı ("Seagull"), recalling the names of two previous fast attack craft in Turkish service.

However, they remained in service for less than 10 years, being discarded in 1973.

== List of vessels ==
Name	Pennant number	Builder	Date of launch	Date of acquisition	Notes
Doğan ("Falcon")	P-327	Båtservice Verft	26.3.60 (as Hugin)	1964	Discarded 1973
Martı ("Seagull")	P-328	Båtservice Verft	26.6.60 (as Munin)	1964	Discarded 1973
