= Emeraude Ferries =

Shipping company

- Founded: 1904
- Defunct: 2006
- Fate: Dissolved
- Headquarters: Saint-Malo, France
- Area served: English Channel
- Key people: Pierre Legras, MD; Gordon Forrest, CEO
- Services: Passenger transportation Freight transportation
- Parent: 2003–2006: Sogestran
- Website: www.emeraudeferries.com

Emeraude Ferries was a shipping company which operated vehicle and passenger ferries between the French city of Saint-Malo and the Channel Islands. The company ceased trading in May 2006 following strong competition and difficulties in finding a suitable vessel for the 2006 season.

== History ==
=== Background ===
Emeraude Ferries was founded in 1904 as Bateaux de la Côte d'Émeraude. The initial operations of the company were to transport passengers and cargo between towns along the Côte d'Émeraude, including Saint Malo, Dinard and Cap Fréhel, and along the River Rance.

=== Early Years ===
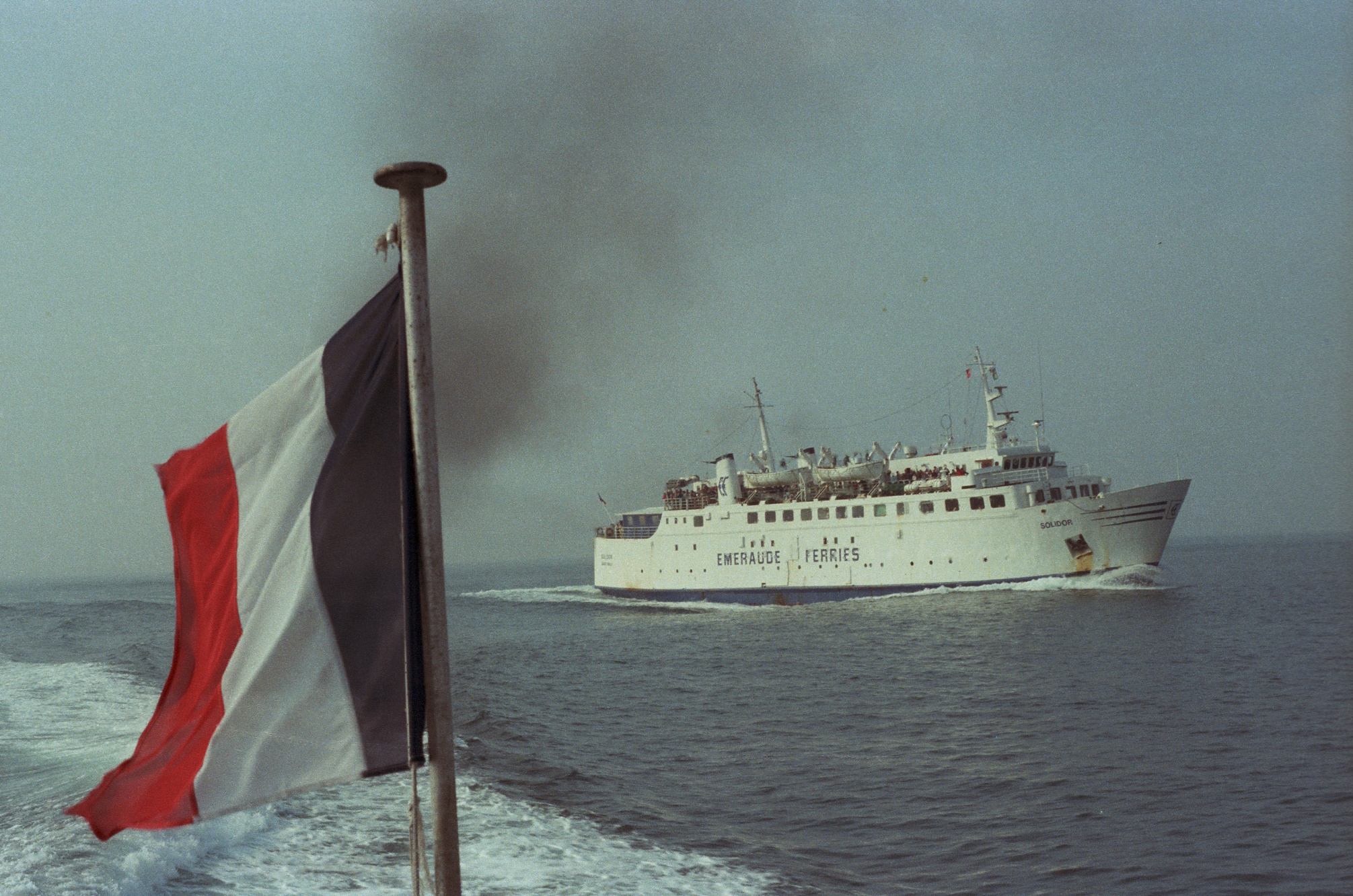
Solidor at sea in 1981

Ferry services to the Channel Islands were commenced in 1977, initially to Jersey only, but later extended to Guernsey in co-operation with Sealink.

=== Amalgamation ===
In 1987 Emeraude took over the services and boats of Vedettes Blanches et Vertes. Blanches et Vertes was formed from the amalgamation of the two previous operating companies Vedettes Blanches Saint Malo and Vedettes Vertes Granvillaises who had first launched their high speed catamaran services to the Channel Islands in 1976. In 1988 the company rebranded its ferry services as Emeraude Lines and adopted a new green/red livery.

In 1990, Emeraude joined forces with British Channel Island Ferries and Brittany Ferries to launch a 'French Connection' service which would allow a Poole-Jersey, Jersey-St Malo, St Malo-Portsmouth round trip to be booked as a single journey across the three operators.

By 1993, Emeraude had decided to introduce a high speed car ferry on their route between St Malo and the Channel Islands. Emeraude opted to order the first Corsaire 6000 66m monohull ferry from Leroux & Lotz. Very poor performance saw the ship spend thirty four days out of action during its first three and a half months in service and she was returned to her builders in at the end of the season for modifications. Even with these modifications, she still fell short of the required specifications and Emeraude refused to take redelivery of the vessel, which saw resulted in her being the only Corsaire 6000 class vessel constructed. It would be another two years before Emeraude would introduce a high speed car ferry to their services, with Solidor 3.

=== Final Years ===
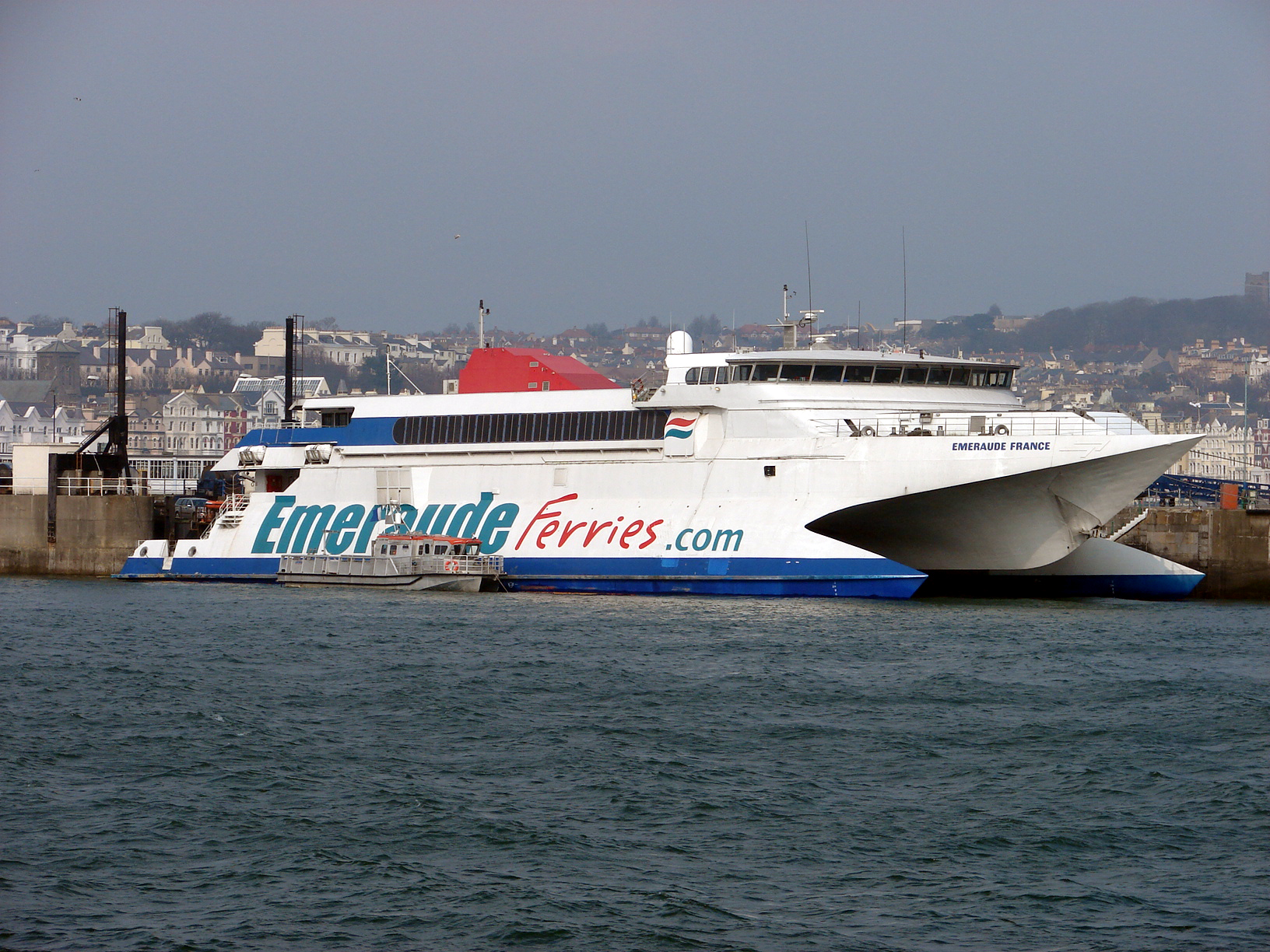
Emeraude France in Douglas Harbour

Competition arrived in March 2003 when Condor Ferries were granted a licence to carry cars from Jersey to St Malo. Previously only Emeraude Lines was permitted to carry cars and passengers to St Malo direct from Jersey. The decision by the States of Jersey had an immediate effect on Emeraude sales and by October of that year the company was in financial difficulties, having reputedly lost £1,000,000 in turnover since Condor operations began on the route. On 2 October 2003, the company filed for protection from bankruptcy in France with debts of €4,000,000, and was given 3 months to demonstrate the viability of a return to profitability. The Solidor 5 was impounded, although eventually released over a £300,000 debt to Jersey Harbours and Airport Committee for harbour fees for several days.

In November 2003, the administrator determined that the company needed to be sold to remain in business and named French company; Compagnie Nationale de Navigation as her preferred bidder for Emeraude, over a rival bid from a Jersey-based investor. Ultimately though, Emeraude Lines was purchased by the Sogestran Group in the same month. The company was renamed Emeraude Ferries, and after ending uncertainty over the service by securing the purchase of Solidor 5 in January 2004, recommenced normal service.

In early 2005, Emeraude tendered to operate routes between Carteret, Granville and Diélette to Jersey, Guernsey, Alderney and Sark. The service had been operated by Connex in 2004, but the French government authority that had initiated and funded the service decided to terminate the contract in October of that year after a number of administrative and technical issues. Emeraude and Connex were beaten by Manche Îles Express, owned by the Breton company Société Morbihannaise de Navigation. Incidentally, SMN's parent company had been among the bidders to take over Emeraude when they were put up for sale in 2003.

A price war with Condor saw Emeraude lose millions of Euros over the Summer of 2005, and this was one of the factors in the decision to cease services. Initially the company only cancelled services in December 2005 until the end of February 2006, due to damage to the stabilising foils on Solidor 5, but the firm was unable to find a replacement vessel. Despite encouragement from the States of Jersey, and an announcement at the end of April 2006 that services would resume from the middle of May, the firm ultimately announced in May 2006, that sailings would not recommence. Reports of the figure vary, but Sogestran are believed to have incurred, by the time of closure, losses of between 8 and 15 million euros since taking over the company.

== Routes ==
- St Malo—Channel Islands: 1977-2005

== Fleet ==
Ship	Built	In service	Tonnage	Current status/Notes
Solidor	1965 (Jos L. Meyer Verft, Papenburg, Germany)	1977–1989	970 GT	Scrapped at Aliağa Ship Breaking Yard in 2010
Nordlicht	1973 (J. J. Sietas GmbH & Co, Hamburg, Germany)	1978	999 GT	Sank in 2003
Emsland / Elba Nova	1977 (Usuki Shipyard of Usuki Iron Works Ltd, Usuki, Japan))	1984 and 1994-5	1,682 GT	Currently in service (2024) as Lady Carmela with Gestour
Trident 2	1976 (Westermoen Hydrofoil, Mandal, Norway)	1987–1990	202 GRT	Purchased by Vedettes Blanches et Vertes in 1985
Trident 3	1982 (Westermoen Hydrofoil, Mandal, Norway)	1987–1996	252 GT	Originally launched by Vedettes Blanches et Vertes as Trident, renamed 1986
Trident 4	1981 (Westermoen Hydrofoil, Mandal, Norway)	1988–1998		
Solidor 2	1977 (Scheepswerf Hoogezand, Hoogezand, Netherlands)	1989–1998	1,599 GT	Scrapped at Tandanor Shipyard in 2022
Trident 5	1974 (Westermoen Hydrofoil, Mandal, Norway)	1990–1996 and 1998–2000	211 GT	
Trident 6	1981 (Westermoen Hydrofoil, Mandal, Norway)	1990–1994	211 GT	
Trident 7	1979 (Westermoen Hydrofoil, Mandal, Norway)	1991–1998	234 GT	
Pegasus	1977 (Westermoen Hydrofoil, Mandal, Norway)	1991–1999	249 GRT	
Mont Orgueil	1985 (Societe Bretonne de Construction Navale (SBCN))	1992-1995 and 1997-1999	46.80 GT	
Emeraude	1994 (Leroux & Lotz Naval, St Malo, France)	1994	851 GT	Sank in October 2022 in port of Papeete after being laid up by owners Aremiti Ferry, since February 2005 due to continual engine issues
Solidor 3	1996 (Kværner Fjellstrand, Omastrand, Norway)	1996–2001	2,085 GT	Currently named (2024) Sama-1
Emeraude Express	1986 (Marinteknik Verkstads, Öregrund, Sweden)	1998		
Normandie Express	1988 (Marinteknik Verkstads, Öregrund, Sweden)	1999–2003		
Solidor 4	1987 (Westermoen Hydrofoil, Mandal, Norway)	1999–2003	1,075 GT	Originally built as a W 5000L refrigerated cargo catamaran for carrying fish and fresh produce between Iceland and The Netherlands. After several years lay-up in Norway, rebuilt during 1992–93 by Oskarshamns Varv as a car carrying fast ferry, including the adding of a third passenger deck for an operator in the Caribbean. Currently in service (2024) as Formentera Direct with Baleària
Sea Shuttle 1	1994 (MK Sea Transportation International, South Africa)	2000–2001		Waterborne airport shuttle for Air France between Saint-Tropez, Cannes and Nice Airport, operated by Emeraude
Solidor 5	2000 (Kværner Fjellstrand, Omastrand, Norway)	2001–2005	2,369 GT	Currently in service (2024) as HSC Don Francesco with Laziomar
Hoverspeed Great Britain; Emeraude GB	1990 (Incat, Tasmania, Australia)	2004–2005	3,000 GT	Holder of Hales Trophy 1990–1998. Currently in service (2024) as HSC High Speed Jet with Seajets
Emeraude France	1990 (Incat, Tasmania, Australia)	2005	3,012 GT	Currently in service (2024) as HSC Cat with Seajets
