= Ludvig Hope Faye =

Norwegian politician

Ludvig Hope Faye (4 March 1931 – 1 June 2017) was a Norwegian politician for the Conservative Party.

He served as a deputy representative to the Norwegian Parliament from Vest-Agder during the term 1977–1981.

He was the mayor of Mandal municipality from 1972 to 1975. Following the 1987 elections, Faye became the new county mayor (fylkesordfører) of Vest-Agder. In 1995 he was succeeded by Christian Democrat Kjell Svindland.

Preceded by Niels-Otto Hægeland	County mayor of Vest-Agder; 1987–1995	Succeeded by Kjell Svindland
