= United States Nasty-class patrol boat =

Fast patrol boat class

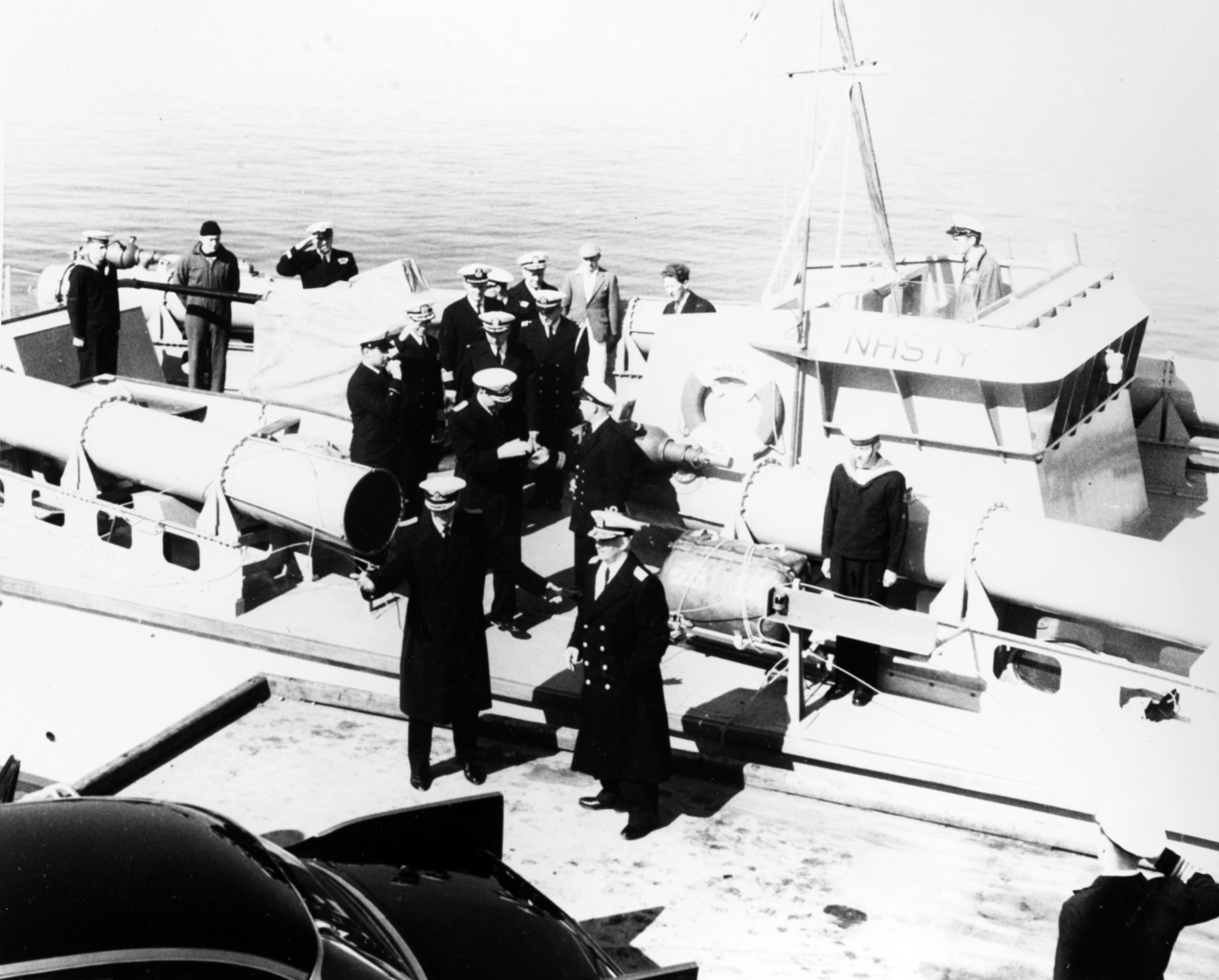
- Norwegian MTB Nasty

Class overview
- Builders: Westermoen Båtbyggeri, Mandal, Norway John Trumpy & Sons, Annapolis, Maryland
- Operators: United States Navy United States Marine Corps
- Built: 1962–1968
- In commission: 1962–1981
- Completed: 20

General characteristics
- Type: Patrol boat
- Displacement: 80 long tons (81 t)
- Length: 80 ft 4 in (24.49 m)
- Beam: 24 ft 7 in (7.49 m)
- Draft: 3 ft 10 in (1.17 m)
- Propulsion: 2 × Napier Deltic Turboblown diesel engines, 6,200 bhp (4,623 kW)
- Speed: 38 knots (70 km/h; 44 mph)
- Complement: 17 men
- Armament: 1 × Bofors 40 mm gun; 2 × 20 mm gun; 1 × "Piggyback" 81 mm mortar/0.50 machine gun

The Nasty class of fast patrol boats were a set of 20 vessels built for the United States Navy to a Norwegian design and purchased in the 1960s for covert operations during the Vietnam War. Following the conflict they remained in service until the early 1980s.

== Construction ==
Following World War II the US Navy had little use for fast attack craft, and most of her PT boats were disposed of shortly after VJ Day. With the involvement in the Vietnam War the Navy saw a renewed need for small combatant craft for "brown water" operations, and they approached the Norwegian Westermoen company, which had built a prototype fast attack boat, the Nasty, and was currently building a set of 12 vessels (the Tjeld-class patrol boats) for the Royal Norwegian Navy.

The USN ordered two vessels, which were delivered in 1962 and were designated PTF 3 and PTF 4. This was followed in 1966 with an order for 14 more (PTFs 5-16), with an agreement for a further six to be built under licence by Trumpy of Annapolis. Trumpy's had been a major contributor to the USN's PT fleet in World War II, and had been one of just four yards asked post-war to build a prototype PT boat to consolidate wartime experience and the lessons learned.

The Norwegian boats were delivered in 1964, and the Trumpy boats three years later.

A subsequent improved version, the Osprey-class, was larger with aluminum instead of wooden hulls, of which four were operated by the U.S.Navy, assigned hull numbers PTF-23 through PTF-26.

== Service history ==
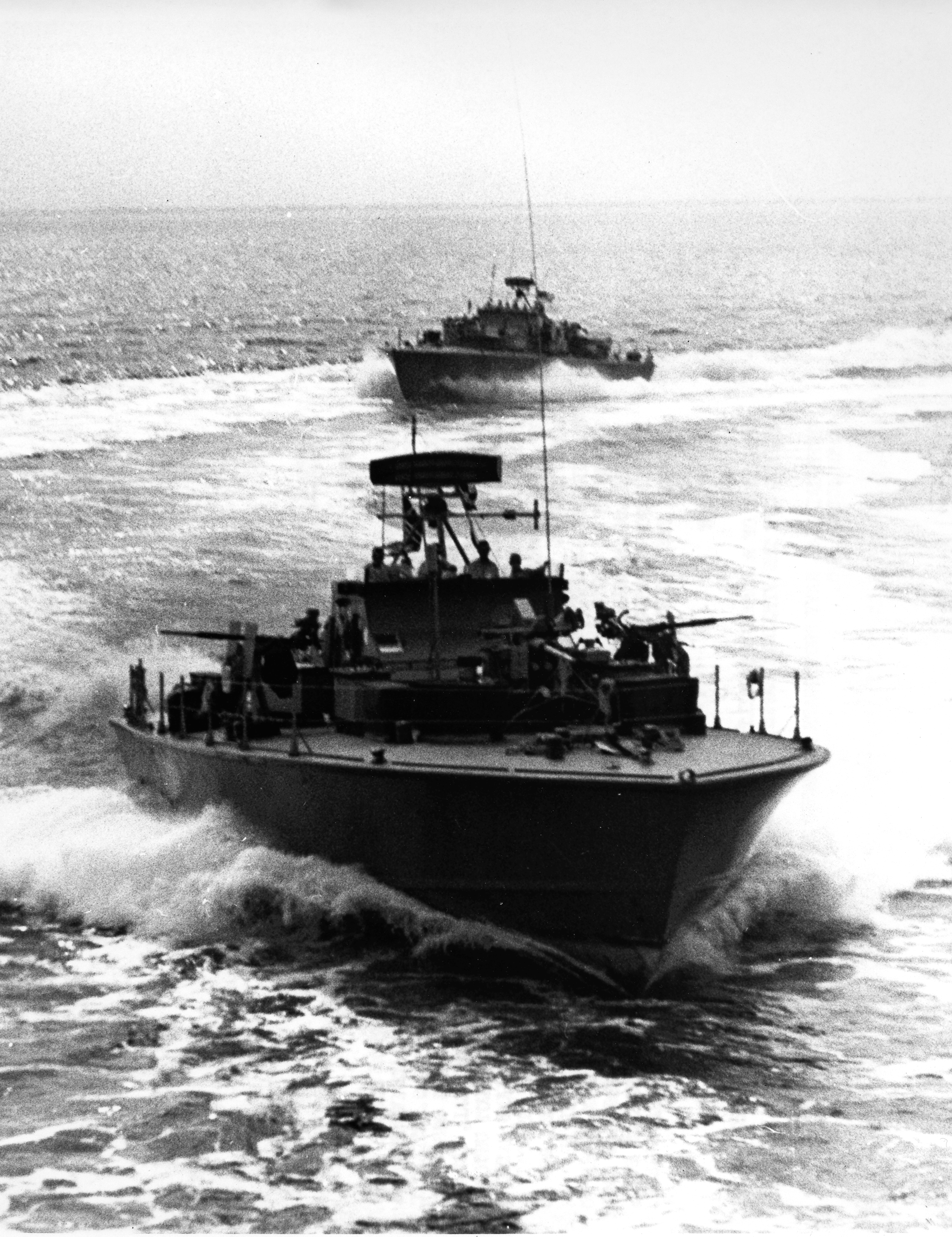
Two Nasty-class boats conduct high-speed trials in May 1963

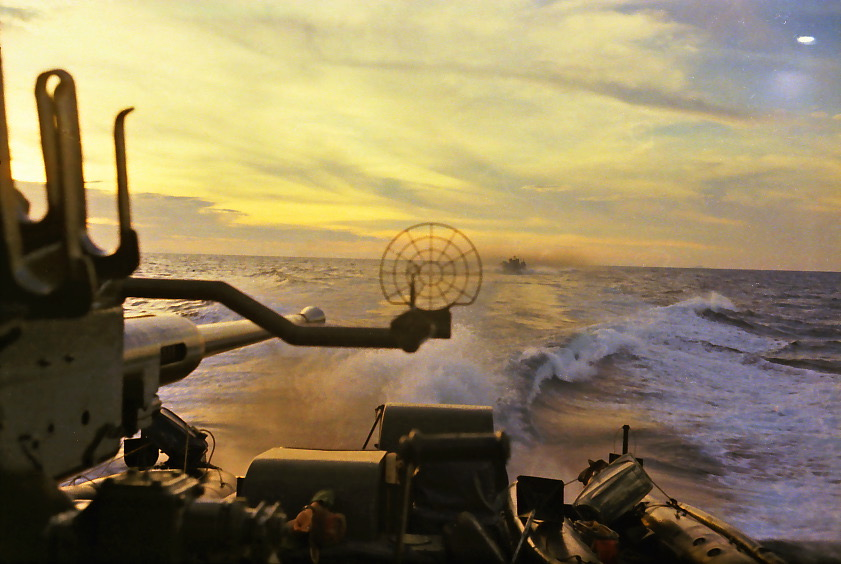
Nasty-class patrol boats operated by MACV-SOG Detachment 2 return from the DMZ, 1971

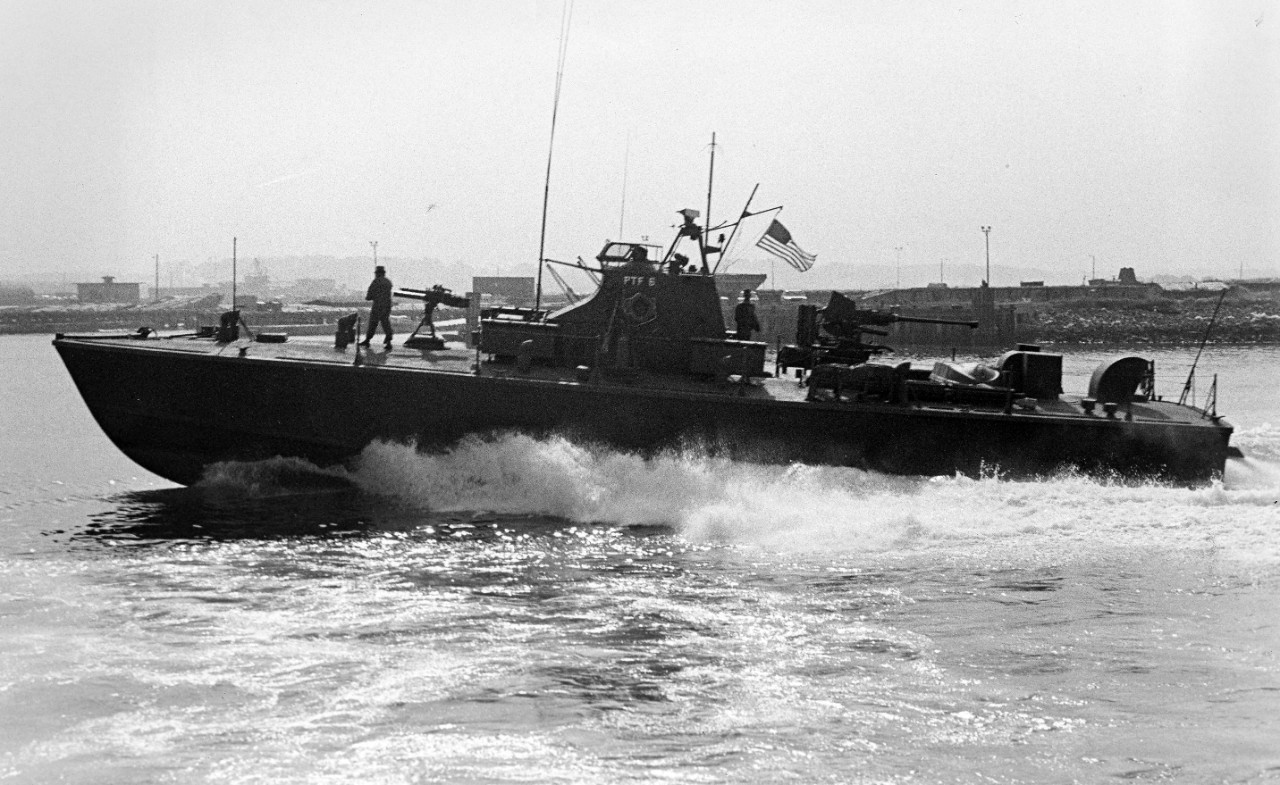
Nasty-class PTF-6 at naval amphibious base, Little Creek, Virginia, December 1973

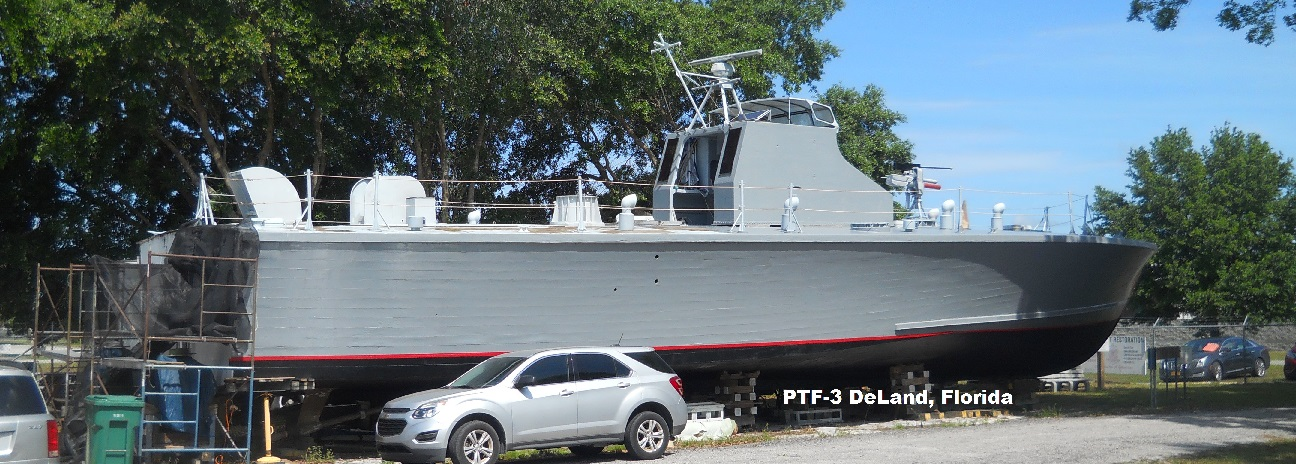
PTF-3 Nasty Class Patrol Boat in Deland, Florida undergoing restoration.

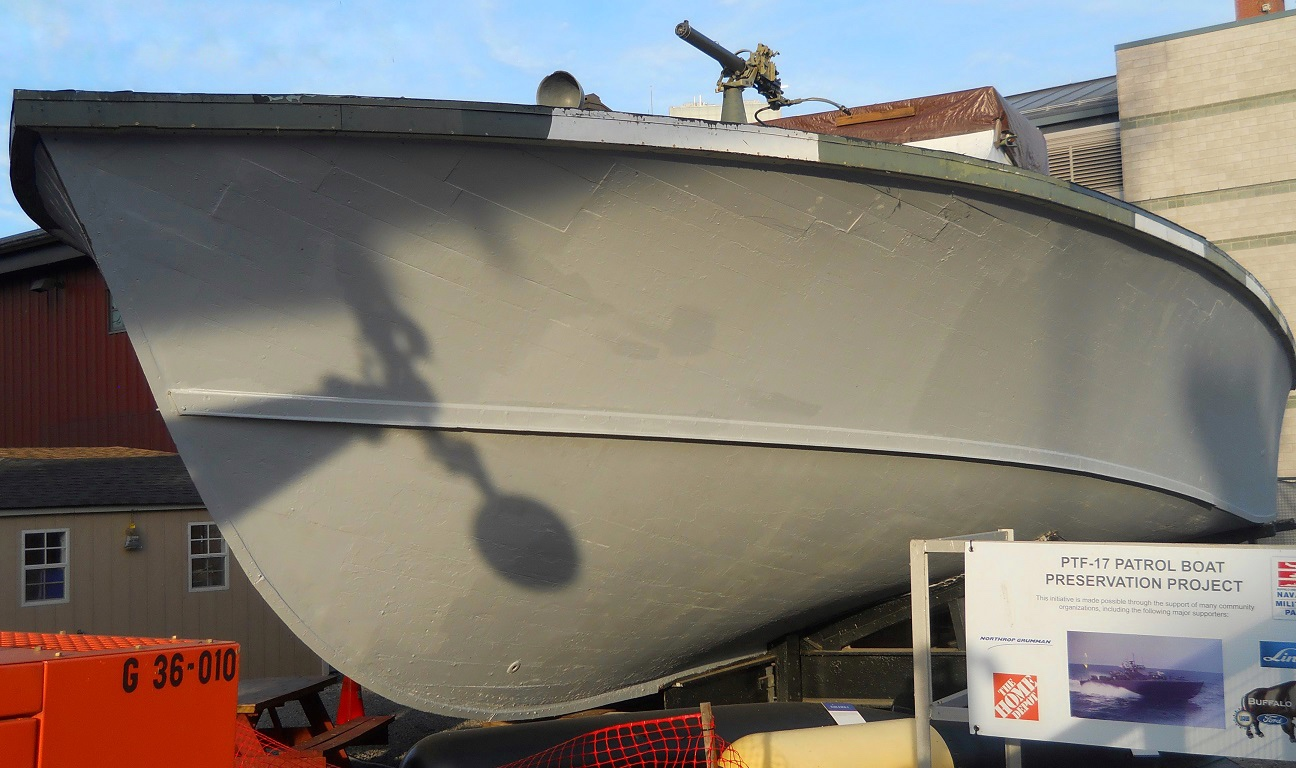
PTF-17 in modern times at the Buffalo Naval Park.

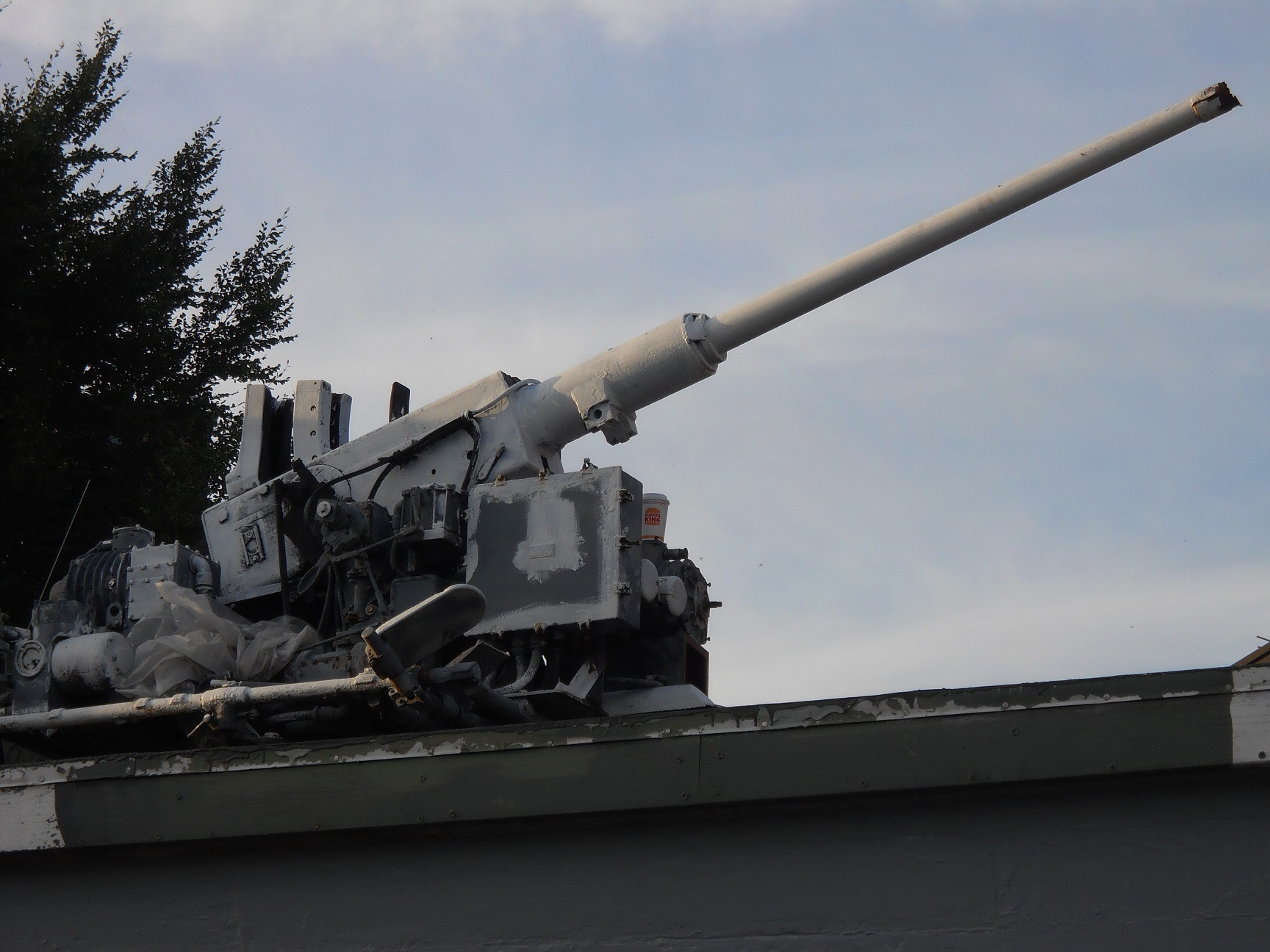
The Bofors 40 mm Anti-Aircraft Gun mounted on PTF-17 at the Buffalo Naval Park

All vessels of the class saw action during the war in Vietnam, being employed by the special forces for clandestine operations along the coast of North Vietnam. During these operations six boats were lost; one (PTF 4) in 1964 and five more in 1966. In 1966 four boats were transferred to the South Vietnamese Navy, though they were returned and re-commissioned in 1970.

With the end of the conflict the need for these boats evaporated, and the high maintenance costs of such vessels militated against retaining them. Most were disposed of in the 1970s and all were gone by 1981, except for PTF 17, which is on display at the Buffalo and Erie County Naval & Military Park.

== List of vessels ==
Number	Date of acquisition	Builder	Notes
PTF 3	December 1962	Westermoen	Transferred to South Vietnamese Navy January 1966, returned 1970. Stricken 1977; currently located at the Deland Naval Air Station Museum, DeLand, Florida undergoing restoration as a museum artifact
PTF 4	December 1962	Westermoen	Sunk 1964
PTF 5	March 1964	Westermoen	Transferred to South Vietnamese Navy January 1966, returned 1970. Stricken 1981
PTF 6	March 1964	Westermoen	Transferred to South Vietnamese Navy January 1966, returned 1970. Stricken 1977
PTF 7	March 1964	Westermoen	Transferred to South Vietnamese Navy January 1966, returned 1970. Stricken 1977
PTF 8	March 1964	Westermoen	Sunk 1966
PTF 9	September 1964	Westermoen	Sunk 1966
PTF 10	September 1964	Westermoen	Stricken 1981
PTF 11	September 1964	Westermoen	Stricken 1981
PTF 12	September 1964	Westermoen	Stricken 1977
PTF 13	September 1964	Westermoen	Stricken 1981
PTF 14	September 1964	Westermoen	Sunk 1966
PTF 15	September 1964	Westermoen	Sunk 1966
PTF 16	September 1964	Westermoen	Sunk 1966
PTF 17	1967	Trumpy	Stricken 1981, currently located at the Buffalo and Erie County Naval & Military Park
PTF 18	1967	Trumpy	Stricken 1980
PTF 19	1967	Trumpy	Stricken 1980, currently located at Worton Creek Marina, Chestertown, MD.
PTF 20	1967	Trumpy	Stricken 1981
PTF 21	1968	Trumpy	Stricken 1981
PTF 22	1968	Trumpy	Stricken 1981

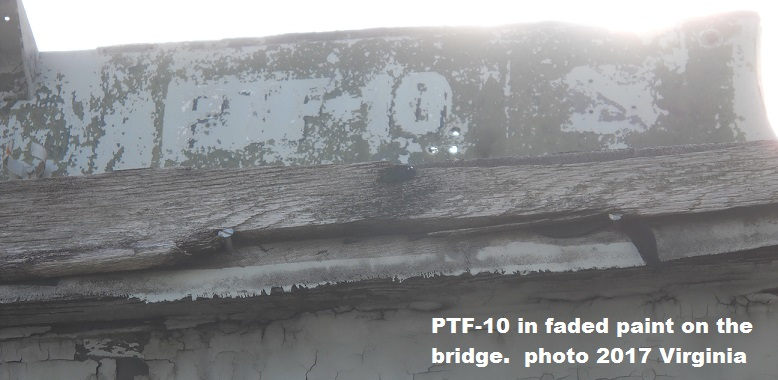
This is a close up photo of some faded paint reading PTF-10. This Nasty Class patrol boat was on blocks in a boat yard in Virginia.
