= Nasty-type patrol boat =

Class overview
- Operators: Royal Norwegian Navy; United States Navy; Hellenic Navy; German Navy; Turkish Navy
- Built: 1959–1966
- In commission: 1960–1992
- Completed: 50

General characteristics
- Type: Patrol boat
- Displacement: 82 long tons (83 t)
- Length: 24.5 m (80 ft 5 in)
- Beam: 7.5 m (24 ft 7 in)
- Draught: 2.08 m (6 ft 10 in)
- Propulsion: 2 × Napier Deltic turbocharged diesel engines, 6,200 hp (4,623 kW)
- Speed: 45 knots (52 mph; 83 km/h)
- Complement: 18 men (Norwegian Navy)
- Armament: 1 × Bofors 40 mm gun; 1 × 20 mm Rheinmetall gun; 4 × 21 in (533 mm) torpedo tubes

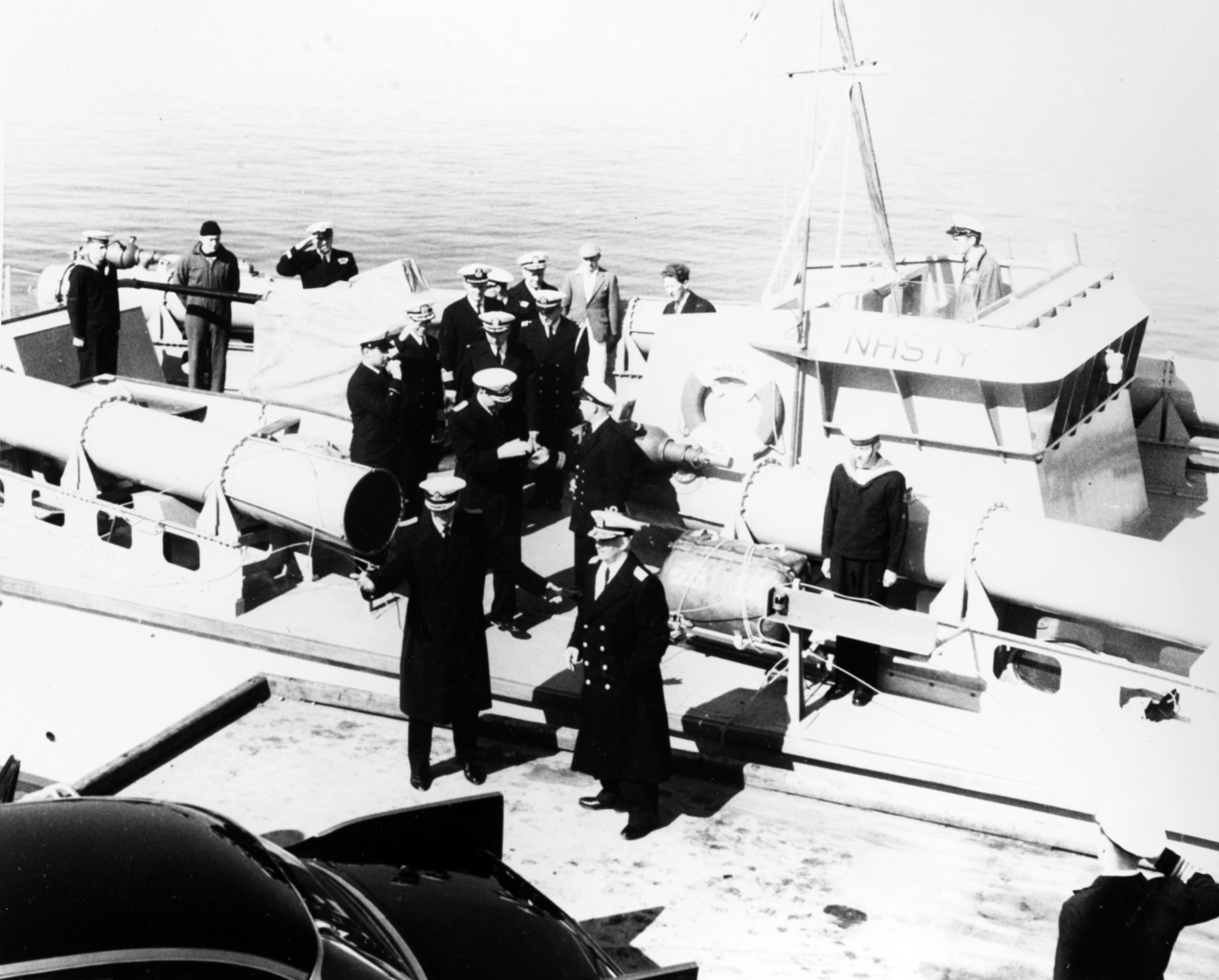
HNoMS Nasty, prototype of the Nasty-type, being visited by U.S. Navy Admiral Arleigh Burke in 1960.

The Nasty type patrol boats were a series of fast patrol boats designed and built in Norway during the 1950s and 1960s for the Norwegian, and other, navies.

The prototype, Nasty, was designed and built in 1957 as a private venture by Westermoen of Mandal, Norway. Following this Westermoen received orders from the Royal Norwegian Navy (for whom they were known as the Tjeld class), and from the navies of the United States, (who called them the Nasty class), Greece and West Germany. Six vessels were also built in the United States under licence (some parts, such as the keel and stem being imported). A total of 50 vessels were constructed of this type during the 1960s and served in five different navies.

== Vessels ==
=== Prototype ===
The prototype, the patrol boat Nasty, was designed as a private venture in 1957 by A/S Båtservice of Oslo, in close cooperation with Royal Norwegian Navy officers with World War II experience in fast patrol boats: The chief designer was naval architect Jan Herman Linge. Nasty was built by Westermoen Båtbyggeri of Mandal, Norway. She was an experimental craft, of wooden hull construction, and was launched in 1958. Nasty served with the Royal Norwegian Navy, and her design was sought after by several other navies, though it required modification to be suitable for serial production. Nasty was stricken in 1967.

=== Royal Norwegian Navy ===
The Tjeld class was a class of twenty fast patrol boats designed and built for the Royal Norwegian Navy in the late 1950s. They were used as torpedo boats in Norway where this type of vessel were called MTBs or motor torpedo boats (motortorpedobåt). The first group of twelve vessels was ordered in 1957, launched between 1959 and 1960, and commissioned in 1960–1962. A second group of eight vessels was ordered in 1962, launched 1962–1963 and commissioned 1963–1966. They remained in service until the late 1970s, when they were placed in reserve; all were stricken by 1995.

=== US Navy ===
The United States Nasty class of fast patrol boats were a set of 22 vessels built for the United States Navy (USN) to the Norwegian design and purchased in the 1960s for "unorthodox operations" during the Vietnam War. Following the conflict they remained in service until the early 1980s. After an initial order of two vessels in 1962 the USN ordered a further 14 in 1966 with an agreement for a further six to be built under licence in the US by John Trumpy & Sons of Annapolis. All vessels saw action in the Vietnam War, with six being lost in action. However at the end of the conflict all were disposed of.

=== Hellenic Navy ===
The Greek Tjeld type patrol boats were a set of six fast patrol boats built for and operated by the Hellenic Navy during the 1960s and early 1970s. The six vessels remained in service until the 1980s, before being placed in reserve. In 1989 four boats were re-engined and re-activated, but by 1995 all had been disposed of.

=== German Navy ===
The German Nasty-class boats were a set of two fast patrol boats built for the post-war German Navy to the Norwegian design and purchased in the 1960s for evaluation purposes. In 1964 they were transferred to Turkey.

=== Turkish Navy ===
The Turkish Nasty type patrol boats were the set of two fast patrol boats built for the German Navy in 1960 and transferred to Turkey as military aid in 1964. They were operated by the Turkish Navy during the 1960s and early 1970s, before being stricken in 1973.

== Sources ==
- Gardiner, Robert; Chumbley, Stephen Conway's All The World's Fighting Ships 1947–1995 (1995) Naval Institute Press, Annapolis ISBN 1-55750-132-7
