= Kjell Svindland =

Norwegian politician (1933–2025)

Kjell Svindland (15 April 1933 – 13 January 2025) was a Norwegian politician for the Christian Democratic Party.

== Life and career ==
Svindland served as a deputy representative to the Norwegian Parliament from Vest-Agder during the terms 1973–1977, 1977–1981, 1981–1985, 1985–1989 and 1989–1993. In total he met during 122 days of parliamentary session.

Following the 1995 elections, Svindland became the new county mayor (fylkesordfører) of Vest-Agder. In 1999 he was succeeded by Thore Westermoen from the same party.

He also served as mayor of Flekkefjord Municipality. Svindland died on 13 January 2025, at the age of 91.

Political offices
Preceded by Ludvig Hope Faye	County mayor of Vest-Agder; 1995–1999	Succeeded by Thore Westermoen
