= HNoMS Gnist =

Skjold-class corvette of the Royal Norwegian Navy

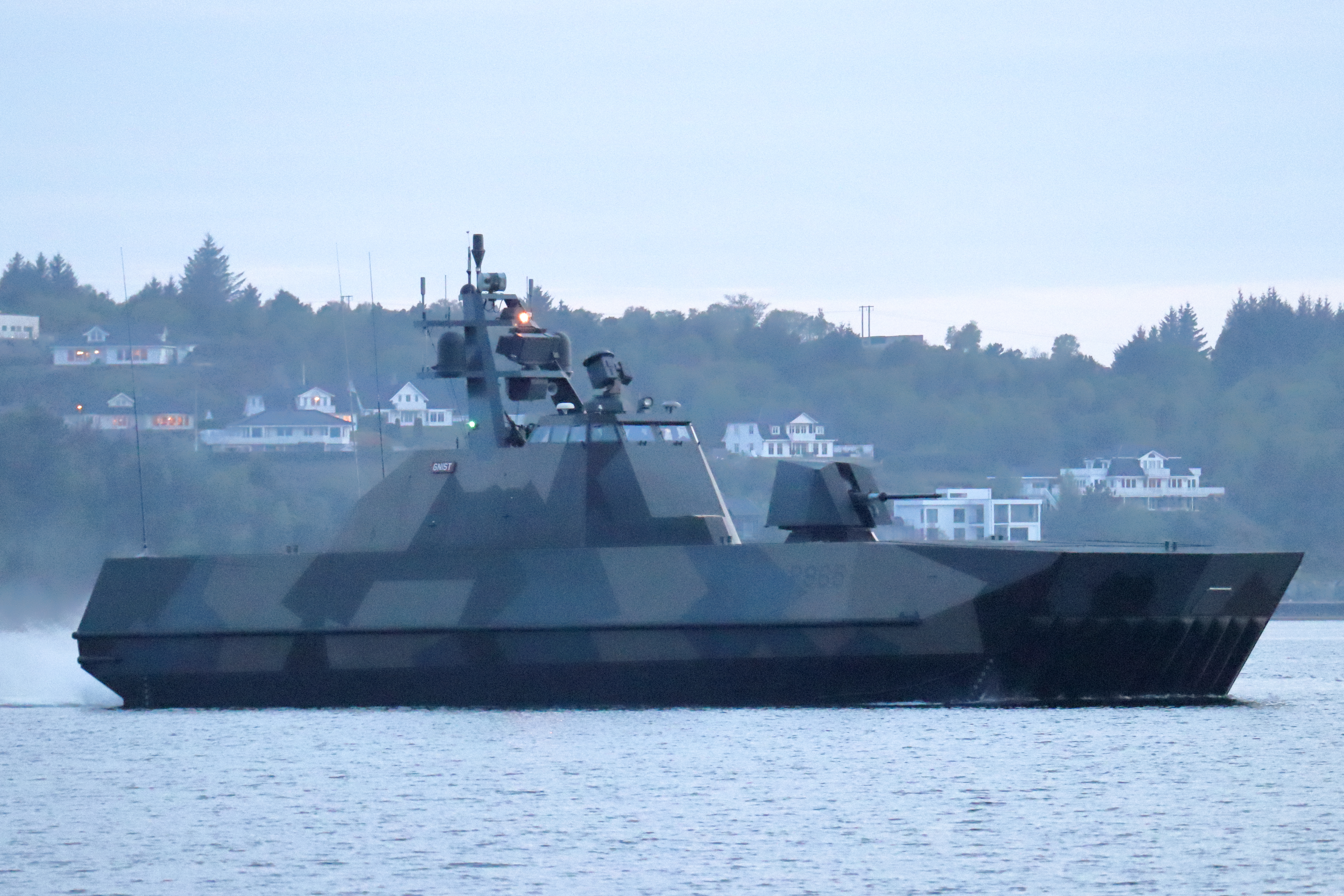
KNM Gnist photographed in Hufthamar, Norway.

HNoMS Gnist is a Skjold-class coastal corvette of the Royal Norwegian Navy. She is the sixth vessel of her class and is home-ported at Haakonsvern Naval Base, near Bergen, Norway.

== Measurements ==
The vessel displaces 274 tonnes at full load and has a length of 155.8 feet (47.5 meters). She has a beam of 44 feet (13.5 meters) and a draft of 2.2 meters. Her propulsion comes from a COGAG System comprising two Pratt & Whitney ST18M and dual ST40M gas turbines powering Rolls-Royce Kamewa waterjets. In calm seas, the vessel can achieve speeds of 60 knots (110 km/h), and in a sea state of 3 she can achieve 45 knots. She has an operational range of 800 nautical miles. She is served by a crew of 15-16 personnel. She is equipped with eight Kongsberg NSM anti-ship missiles, a 76mm Oto-Melara Super Rapid main gun, and two 12.7mm Browning machine guns. She is also capable of carrying a mobile SAM launcher and an additional Sea protector RCWS. Her sensors include Thales MRR-3D-NG radar, Saab Ceros 200, CS-3701 EW Suite, and Sagem Vigy 20 EO. She supports Link 11 and Link 16 tactical data links for networked connection. The Navy plans to keep her operational through 2030 with numerous planned and completed upgrades occurring between 2020 and 2024.

== Construction ==
Her keel was laid down in December 2007, and she was launched on May 18, 2009, at Umoe Mandal Shipyards in Mandal, Norway. She was commissioned on November 7, 2012. her hull is constructed using glass-fiber/carbon composite materials to reduce radar signature to enemy combatants. She features a strengthen foredeck to accommodate its 76mm gun. Following trials, she finally entered service in late 2012. The vessel utilizes an air cushion to achieve a shallower draft in inland waters and uses a catamaran-style hull.

== Service ==
Since her commissioning, the Gnist has served on routine patrol around the waters of Norway and the waters of her allies. In November 2019, she participated in Allied live-fire exercises Norwegian Sea alongside NATO allies such as the USS Gridley. She later transited the Norwegian Sea with her allied ships. On April 25, 2023, she was photographed in Lerwick, Shetland Islands.
