= Skjold-class corvette =

Light, fast, stealth missile corvettes of the Royal Norwegian Navy

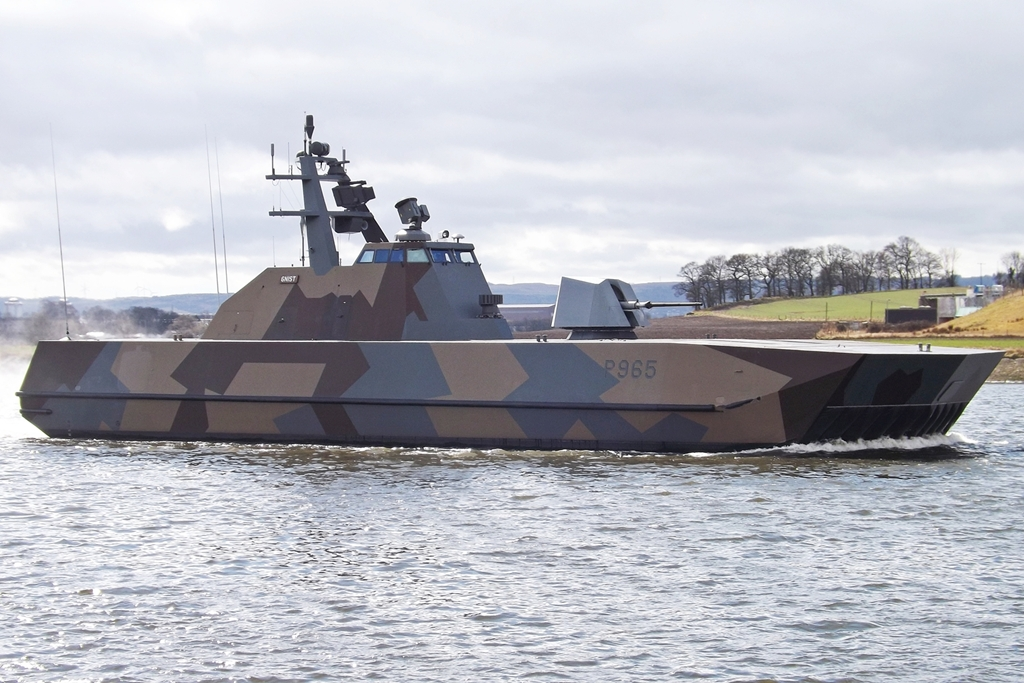
- P965 KNM Gnist

Class overview
- Name: Skjold class
- Builders: Umoe Mandal, Mandal, Norway
- Operators: Royal Norwegian Navy
- Preceded by: Hauk class
- In commission: 1999–present
- Planned: 6
- Active: 6

General characteristics
- Type: Coastal corvette
- Displacement: 274 tonnes full load
- Length: 47.50 m (155.8 ft); 44.3 m (145 ft) (Length on cushion)
- Beam: 13.5 m (44 ft)
- Draught: 1.0 m (3.3 ft)
- Propulsion: Renk COGAG; 2 × Pratt & Whitney ST18M plus; 2 × Pratt & Whitney ST40M gas turbines; →12,170 kilowatts
- Speed: In sea state 3: 45 knots (83 km/h); In sea state 5: >25 knots (46 km/h); In calm sea: >60 knots (110 km/h)
- Range: 800 nmi (1,500 km) at 40 knots (74 km/h)
- Complement: 15–16
- Sensors & processing systems: Thales MRR-3D-NG air/surface radar; Terma Scanter 6000 after the MLU; Saab Ceros 200 FC; CS-3701 electronic warfare suite; Sagem Vigy 20 electro-optical sensor
- Armament: 8 × Kongsberg Naval Strike Missile SSMs, kept in an internal weapons bay; 1 × 76mm Otobreda Super Rapid multi-role cannon; 2 × 12.7mm Browning M2HB HMGs; Portable SIMBAD version Mistral SAMs; Protector (RWS) (Sea Protector)
- Notes: Soft kill: TKWA/MASS; Other: Link 11 and Link 16

Skjold-class corvettes (skjold means "shield" in Norwegian) are a class of six light, superfast, stealth missile corvettes in service with the Royal Norwegian Navy. The boats were formerly classed as MTBs (motor torpedo boats) but, from 2009, the Royal Norwegian Navy has described them as corvettes (korvett) because their seaworthiness is seen as comparable to corvettes, and because they do not carry torpedoes. They were built at the Umoe Mandal yard. With a maximum speed of 60 knots (110 km/h), the Skjold-class corvettes were the fastest combat ships afloat at the time of their introduction.

== Design ==
The Skjold design is a surface effect craft, constructed of glass fibre/carbon composite materials. Buoyancy is augmented underway by a fan-blown skirted compartment between the two rigid catamaran-type hulls. This provides an alternative solution to the planing hull/vee hull compromise: the air cushion reduces wave slam at high speeds while presenting a low-drag flat planing profile at the waterline.

To ensure stealth capabilities, anechoic coatings of radar absorbent materials (RAM) have been used in the load-bearing structures over large areas of the ship. This strategy leads to significant weight saving compared to the conventional construction technique of applying RAM cladding to the external surfaces. The ship's profile has a faceted appearance with no right angle structures and few orientations of reflective panels. Doors and hatches are flush with the surfaces and the windows are flush without visible coaming (edge of window aperture) and are fitted with radar reflective screens. The vessels are additionally protected by the Rheinmetall MASS sensor / decoy system.

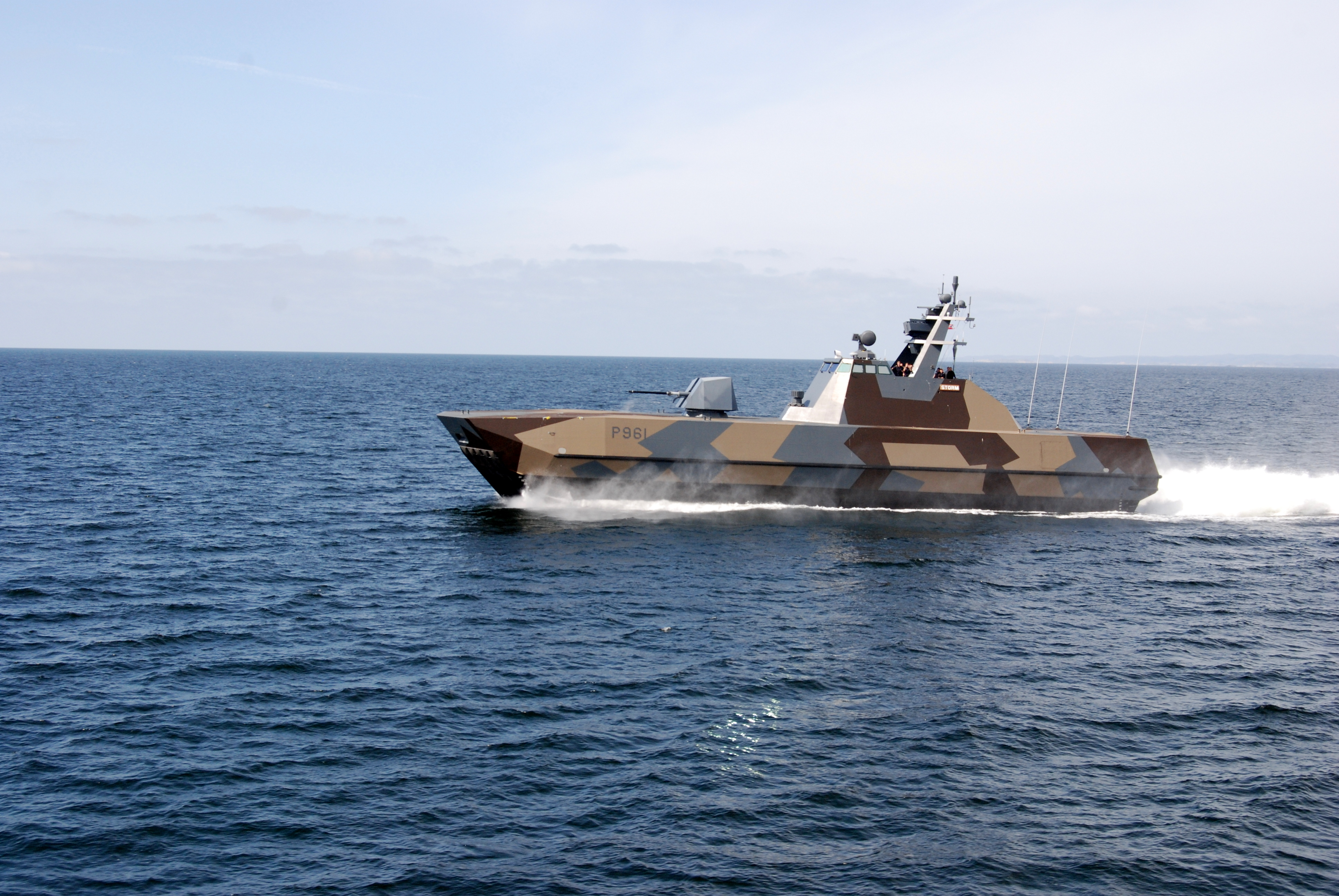
Royal Norwegian Navy corvette Storm.

The final design was changed compared to the prototype Skjold, which itself was rebuilt to the new specifications. Most notably, the vessels use 4 gas turbines combined by Renk COGAG gear units built in a lightweight design. The smaller gas turbines rated 2,000 kW turbines are used for cruising speed. For sprint speed a second, larger gas turbine is combined providing a total of 6,000 kW to the waterjet on each shaft line. Two MTU 123 cruise diesel propulsion units used previously at loiter speeds were removed. The foredeck was strengthened to accommodate the addition of a 76 mm Otobreda Super Rapid gun.

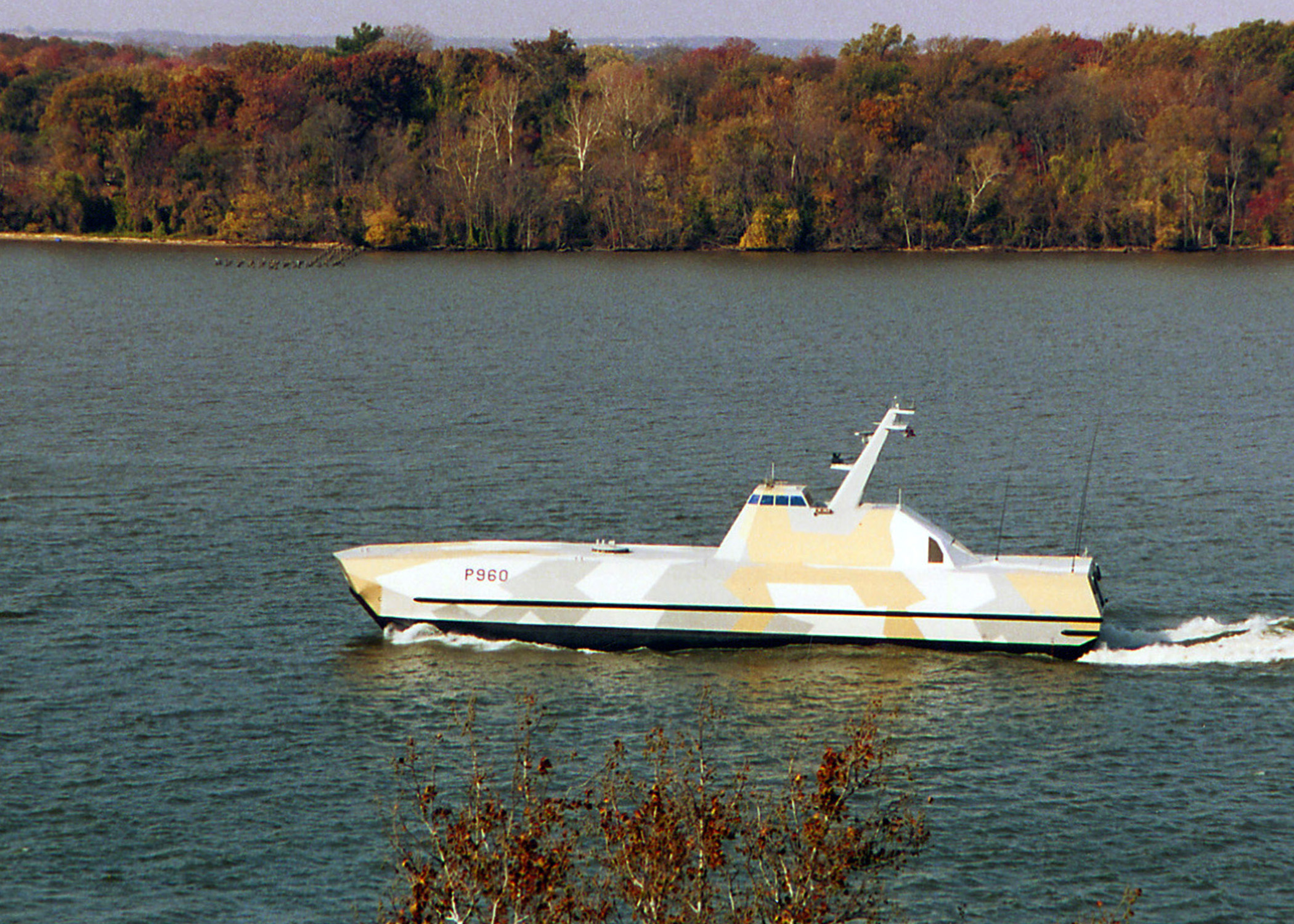
Port side view of Royal Norwegian Navy corvette Skjold.

The hull material was produced by a different method to improve strength and minimize vulnerability to fire. The bridge saw some changes, including an upgrade to six weapon systems control consoles.

In 2020, the Norwegian Government decided to further upgrade the Skjold-class vessels, partially to compensate for the loss of the frigate Helge Ingstad. The upgrades of the four ships would take place between 2020 and 2024, permitting the Skjold-class to remain up-to-date through to 2030 when replacement vessels were envisaged under terms of the government's defence plan. In February 2026, contract was signed for upgrade of the fire control radar and electro-optical sensors for four vessels. The radar upgrade is to ensure capability to deliver precise fire with the 76 mm gun, while the new electro-optical sensors will improve the vessels’ ability to detect and track targets at sea and in the air, including smaller and fast-moving objects such as drones.

== US Navy ==
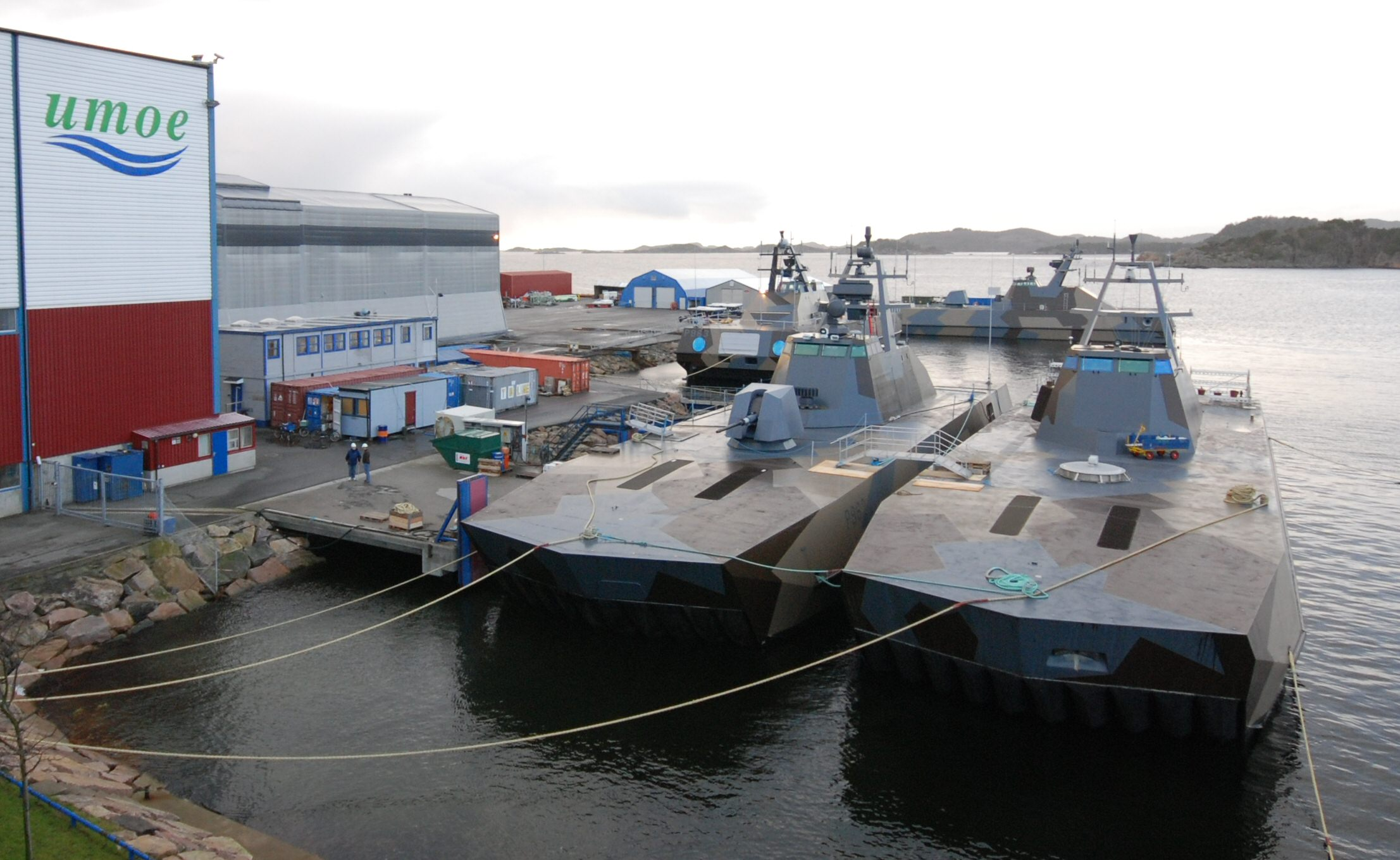
Skjold-class corvettes in harbour at Umoe Mandal shipyard, Norway.

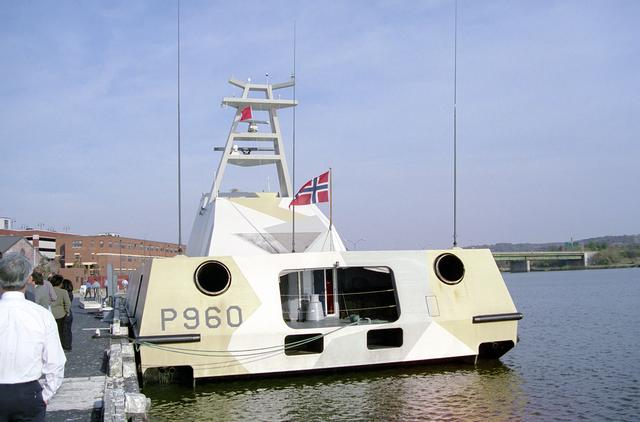
Royal Norwegian Navy corvette Skjold on its American tour, view from astern.

The U.S. Navy and Coast Guard expressed interest in the design and leased the P960 for a period of one year, from 2001 until 2002. During that time it was operated by a 14-person Norwegian crew from Naval Amphibious Base Little Creek.

== Vessels ==
Skjold class – significant dates
#	Name	Laid down	Launched	Commissioned	Notes
P960	Skjold	4 August 1997	22 September 1998	17 April 1999	Name means Shield in Norwegian
P961	Storm	October 2005	1 November 2006	9 September 2010	Name means Storm in Norwegian
P962	Skudd	March 2006	30 April 2007	28 October 2010	Name means Shot in Norwegian
P963	Steil	October 2006	15 January 2008	30 June 2011	Name means Unyielding in Norwegian
P964	Glimt	May 2007	15 August 2008	30 March 2012	Name means Flash in Norwegian
P965	Gnist	December 2007	18 May 2009	7 November 2012	Name means Spark in Norwegian

== See also ==
- List of ships of the Norwegian Navy

=== Similar ships ===
- Baynunah-class corvette (United Arab Emirates)
- Hamina-class missile boat (Finland)
- Steregushchiy-class corvette (Russia)
- Type 022 missile boat (People's Republic of China)
- Milgem-class corvette (Turkey)
- Roussen-class fast attack craft (Greece)
- Visby-class corvette (Sweden)
- Kuang Hua VI-class missile boat (Taiwan)
