= Thore Westermoen =

Norwegian politician (born 1949)

Thore Westermoen (born 17 September 1949 in Mandal) is a Norwegian politician for the Christian Democratic Party.

He is the son of Toralf Westermoen, who among other things is a former member of the national Parliament. Thore Westermoen himself served as a deputy representative to the Parliament of Norway from Vest-Agder during the terms 1989–1993, 1997–2001 and 2005–2009.

Following the 1999 election, Westermoen became the new county mayor (fylkesordfører). He was re-elected in 2003 and 2007. After the 2011 Norwegian local elections the local alliance he led was dissolved. He was offered the county mayor post if the Christian Democratics cooperated with Labour, but they rejected. Westermoen was relegated to deputy county mayor.

From 1986 to 1989, he was a member of the board of Norwegian State Railways, before advancing to deputy chairman of the board, a position he held from 1990 to 1993.

Political offices
Preceded by Kjell Svindland	County mayor of Vest-Agder; 1999–2011	Succeeded by Terje Damman
