= Westamaran =

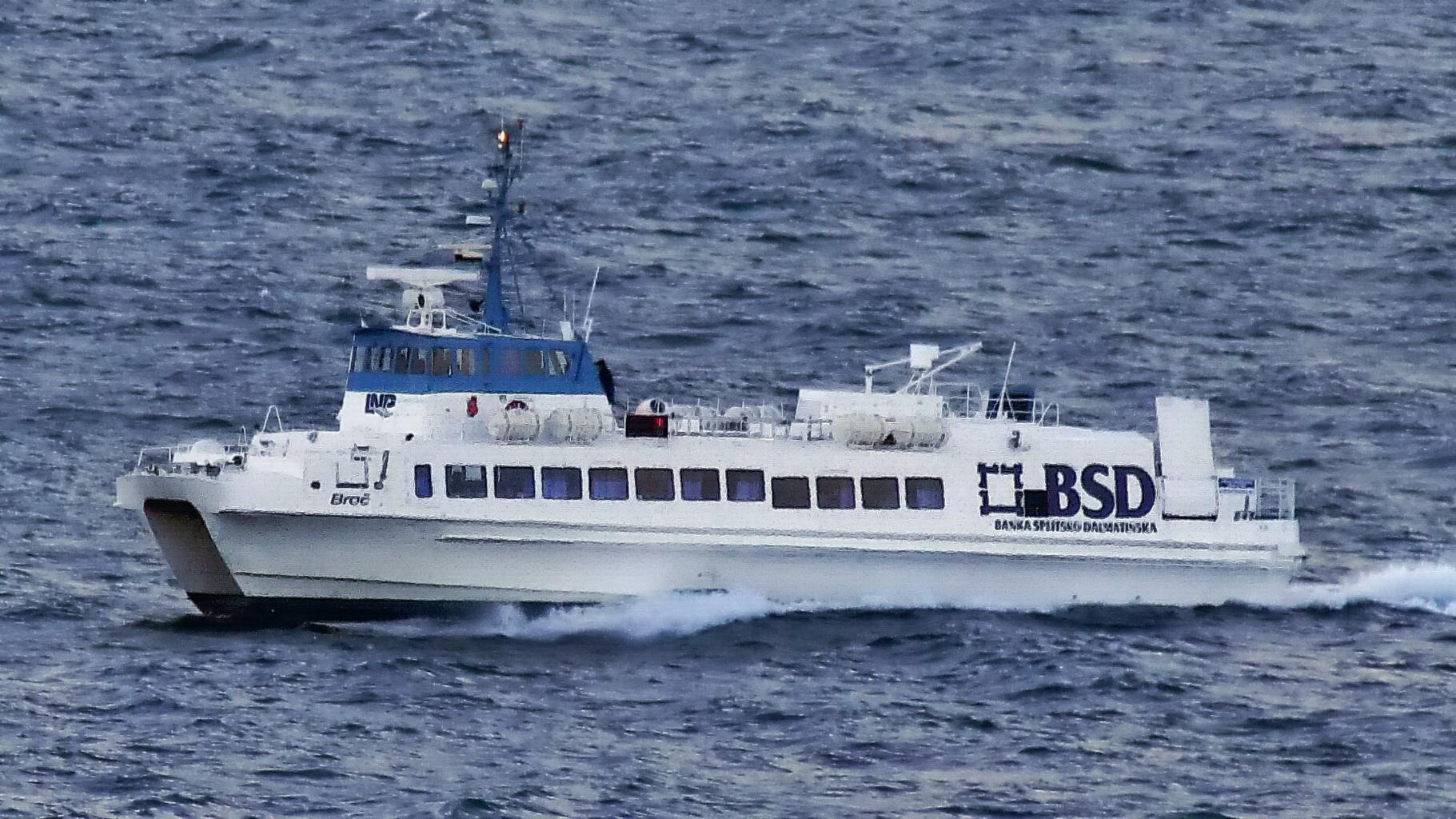
Broč (former Sunnhordland, bnr 38), a Westamaran Type W95, built in 1975, still operating in Croatia (photo taken on Mar 19, 2013)

The Westamaran is a pioneer type of passenger transport high-speed catamaran developed by Westermoen Hydrofoil in 1973. The craft was highly successful and introduced a new era of passenger transport along the Norwegian coast and elsewhere.

On the Bergen to Stavanger route, there was already a high-speed service by hydrofoil, introduced early in the 1960s. The initial Westamaran models were somewhat slower than the hydrofoils. Still, passenger comfort, both in terms of spaciousness, especially foul weather handling, was better in the Westamarans, so the public liked them.

The Westamaran had asymmetrical hulls, where the insides were essentially flat, forming a tunnel between the hulls that were rectangular in shape. The profiles were quite like a Storm class torpedo boat cut in two, and the construction of the Westamaran built heavily on the experience gained from the Storm class.

Specifications:

- Capacity: 166 passengers
- Length overall: 26.67m
- Beam: 9.02m
- Draft: 1.20m
- Engines: 2 x Diesel MTU 12 V 396 TC 62
- Power: 2 x 880 kW.
- Layout: Shaft drives through two ZF BW 800 HS 20 hydraulic gearboxes to LIPS fixed propellers.
- Aux. engine: Mercedes OM314, Stamford MHC 2341 generator 32,5 kVA
