= Umoe Mandal =

Shipbuilding company

Coordinates: 58.0164°N 7.4780°E

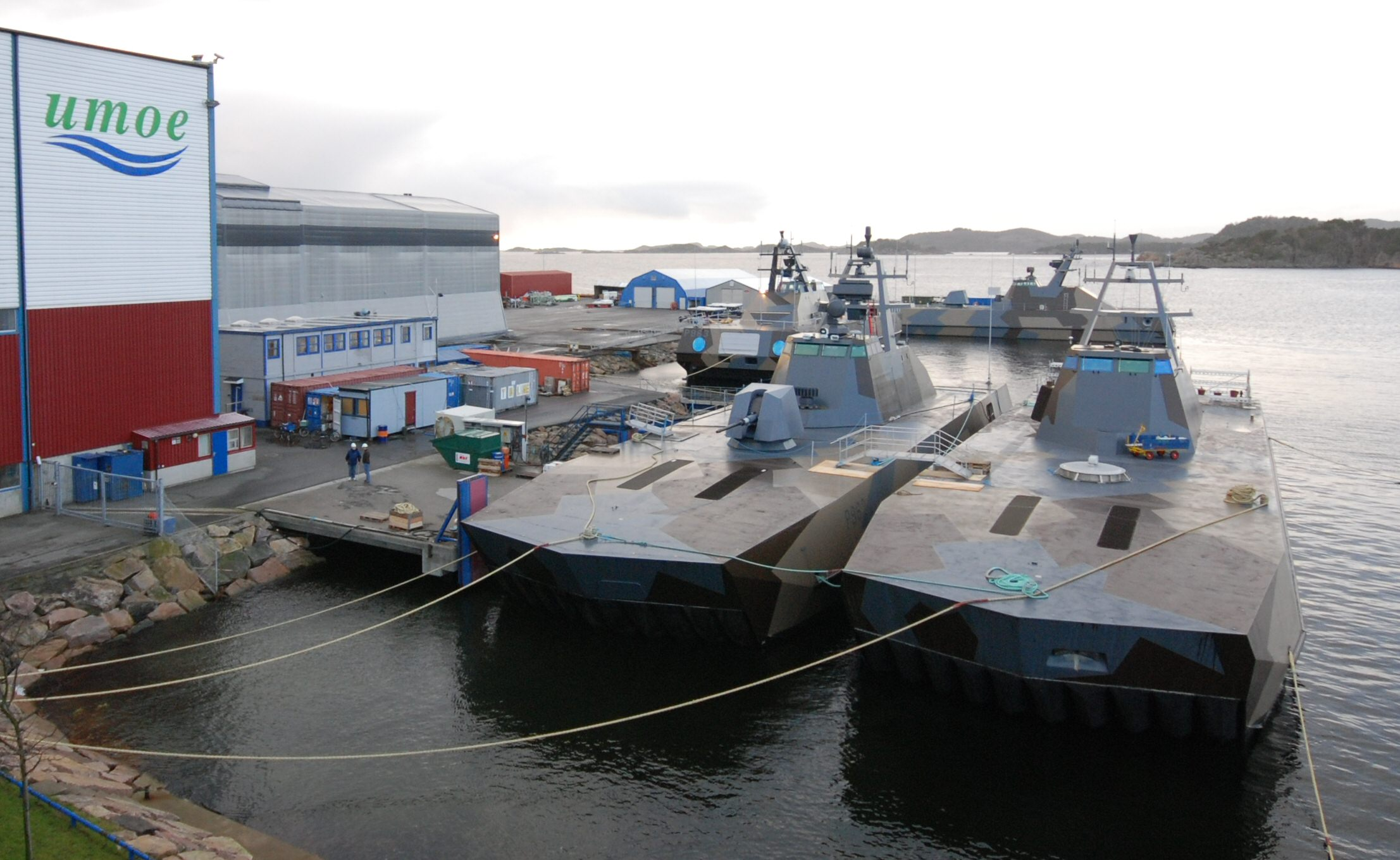
Four Skjold class craft in harbour at Umoe Mandal shipyard, Norway

Umoe Mandal AS is a shipbuilding company in the Ulltveit-Moe Group. Their shipyards are based at Mandal in Norway.

Founded in 1989 as Kværner Båtservice, later Kværner Mandal, and known as Umoe Mandal since 2000, the company specialises in high-speed naval vessels, mine countermeasure vessels (MCMVs) and fast patrol boats (FPBs). They supply the Royal Norwegian Navy, for whom they are currently in production with the Fast Attack Craft series Skjold.

The company is especially known for its expertise in the use of fibre reinforced plastic (FRP) technology in naval applications. It undertakes the design of naval and commercial vessels in FRP and other advanced composites structures for military applications, as well as shock design, stealth design, and EMI/EMC measures and weight/strength optimisation.

The company also produces a range of special products in its market area, such radar stealth air intakes, carbon fibre composite centrifugal fans and, through its subsidiary Umoe Ryving (established 2003), the design and production of FRP composite blades for the wind turbine industry.
