= Jan Herman Linge =

Norwegian engineer and boat designer (1922-2007)

- Born: 28 January 1922; Trondheim, Norway
- Died: 25 June 2007 (aged 85); Asker, Norway

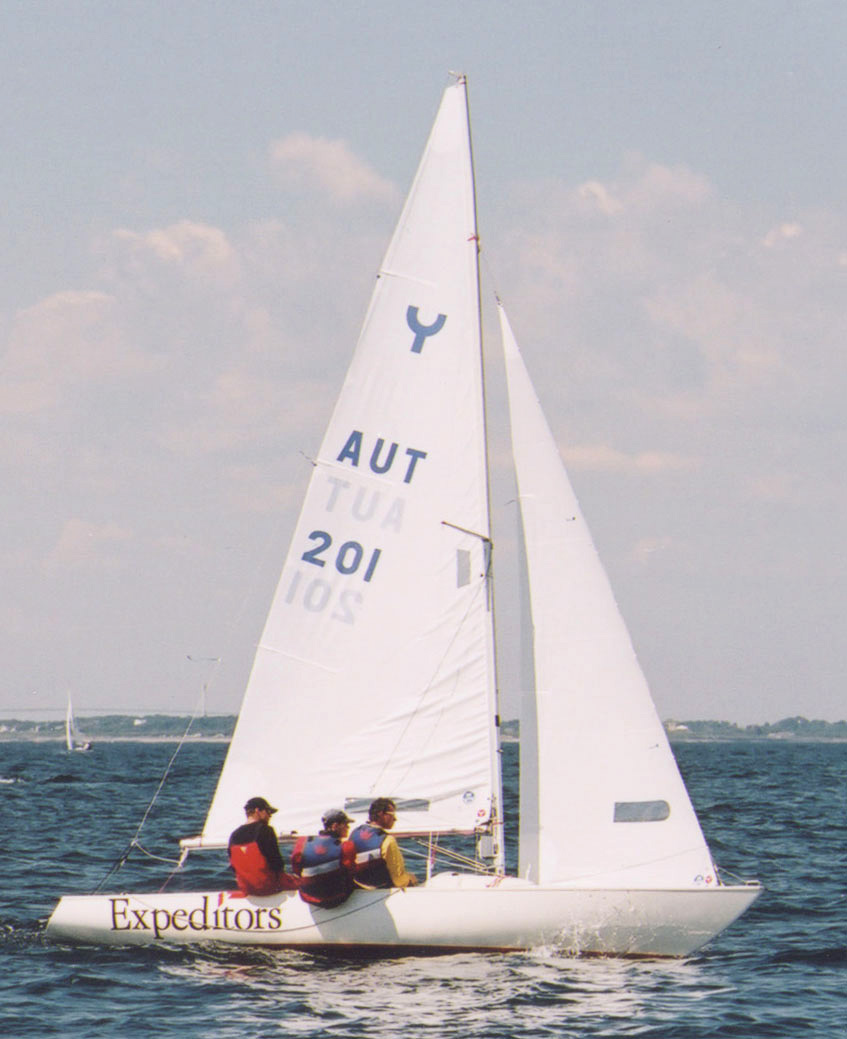
Yngling designed by Jan Herman Linge

Jan Herman Linge (28 January 1922 in Trondheim, Norway – 25 June 2007 in Asker, Norway) was a Norwegian engineer and boat designer.

== Early life and career ==
Linge was born in Trondheim, Norway. He was the son of Martin Linge who was known for his war effort in Kompani Linge.

He was a member of the merchant navy for two years before undertaking a naval architecture course while financing his studies by working in a shipyard.

During World War II, he joined the Norwegian resistance movement and was trained as a saboteur in the United Kingdom. He was captured on a mission and spent some time in a German prison camp. Linge completed his studies in 1949.

== Design work ==
Linge was an engineer from 1949 to 1956 in Westermoen Båtbyggeri og Mek Verksted, and was responsible for the design of the Tjeld class patrol boat. He later started his own boat design house, Jan H. Linge A/S, and has designed many recreational vessel for other companies.

== Sail boats ==
He was also a very active designer of sail boats. The designs by Linge are known by the "ling" suffix, such as Brisling, Firling, Fjordling, Gambling 34, Lærling, Mekling, Smiling, Wesling and Willing. The Soling was selected as Olympic class in 1968, and participated in 8 Olympic games. The Yngling became an international class in 1979, and an Olympic class in the Athens Olympics in 2004.

In 1998 he was made a Knight 1st Class in the Royal Norwegian Order of St Olav.
