= Westermoen Hydrofoil =

Shipyard in Norway

Coordinates: 58°1′29″N 7°27′31″E

- Industry: Shipbuilding
- Founded: 1961; 65 years ago
- Founder: Toralf Westermoen
- Successor: Westamarin
- Headquarters: Mandal, Norway

Westermoen Hydrofoil was a shipyard located in Mandal, Norway, which has specialized in high speed craft, and pioneered many designs.

The yard was established in 1961 by Toralf Westermoen, who had also started Westermoen Båtbyggeri og Mek Verksted. The yard began producing hydrofoil craft under license from Italian Supramar.

The first boat, Westfoil, with a top speed of 38 knots, was finished in 1962 and was delivered to the Bahamas. After that, a number of small and large (models PT20 and PT50) hydrofoils were built for passenger traffic in western Norway, in the Oslofjord, Øresund, Bahamas and in Greece.

Towards the end of the 1960 they built the world's then-largest hydrofoil, the "Expressen", that could carry 250 passengers. The boat did not achieve the intended design speed of 38 knots, and the contract was annulled. This was the beginning of the end of the hydrofoil epoch in Mandal.

After this, development of a new class of high speed vessel, the catamaran, began. The Westamaran type, constructed by commander Harald Henriksen and introduced in 1973, was very successful, and a new era of high speed craft in Norway and elsewhere was begun.

Towards the end of the 1980s the yard changed name to Westamarin. Westamarin closed in the end of the 1990s.

One of the final ships produced was a single High-speed Sea Service HSS 900 catamaran for Stena Line in 1997. The shipyard went bankrupt shortly afterwards, leading to Stena Line being unable to claim compensation for corrosion later found to the aluminium alloy hull on the vessel (Stena Carisma).

== Productions ==
SS:

- 1969 Nefelin 3
- 1973 Juvikingen
- 1973 Solundir
- 1983 Vøringen

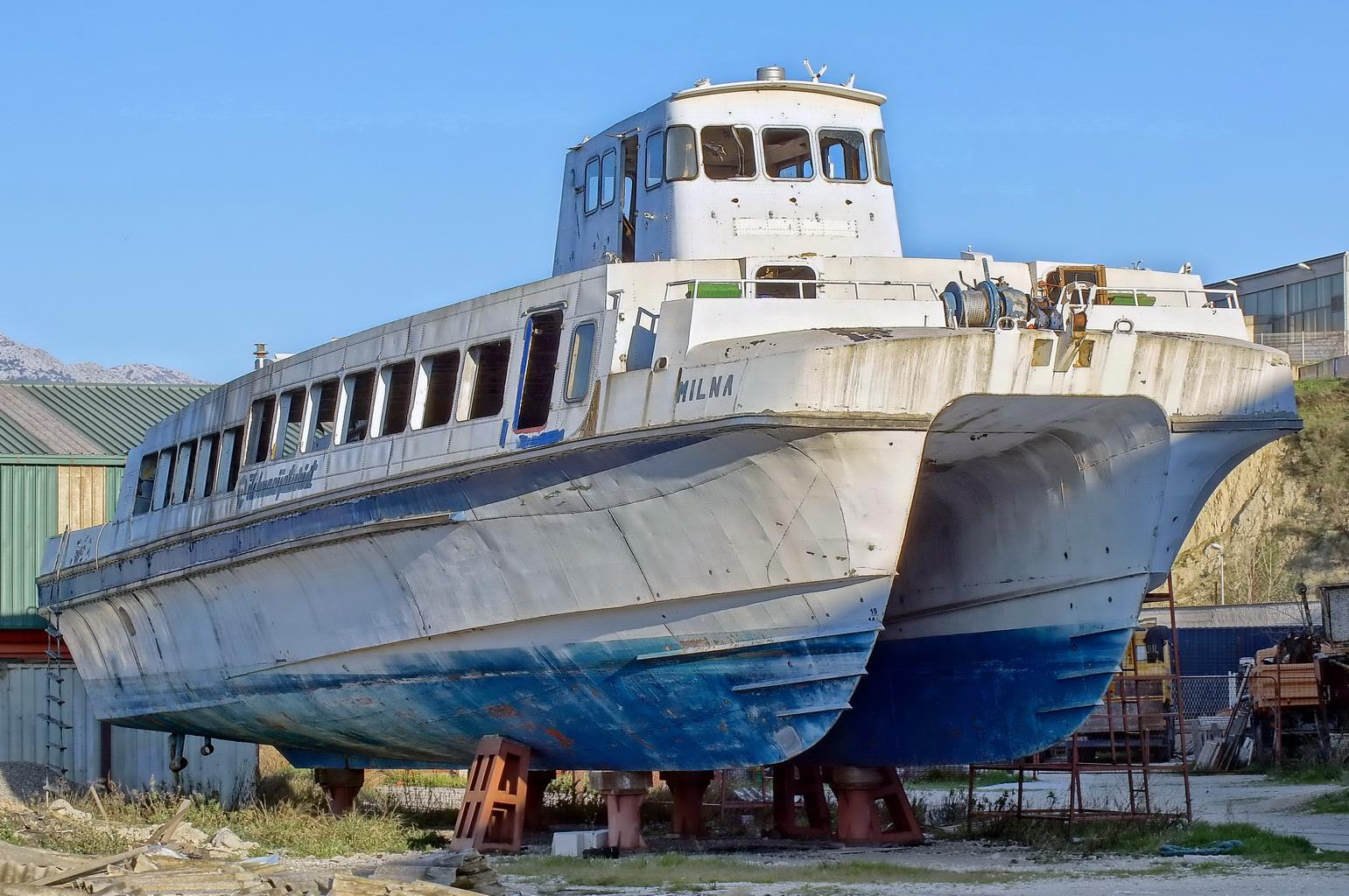
Milna (former Marina 1, bnr 67), a Westamaran Type W86, built in 1978, decaying in Split, Croatia (as seen on Mar 22, 2013)

W86:

- 1971 Fjordglytt
- 1971 Kosterfjord, bnr 21
- 1972 Fjordtroll, bnr 24
- 1972 Mayflower
- 1972 Karmsund
- 1973 Kongsbussen, bnr 27
- 1973 Hertugbussen, bnr 28
- 1973 Tedno, bnr 29
- 1973 Koegelwieck, bnr 32
- 1973 Olavsbussen
- 1973 Haugesund, bnr 35
- 1975 Storesund, bnr 41
- 1975 Fjordkongen, bnr 42
- 1975 Brynilen, bnr 44
- 1975 Øygar, bnr 45
- 1976 Fjorddronningen, bnr 46
- 1976 Highland Seabird, bnr 47
- 1976 Fjorddrott, bnr 48
- 1977 Fjordprinsessen, bnr 49, Avdeling Alta
- 1977 Steigtind, bnr 50, Avdeling Alta
- 1978 Mediteran, bnr 54
- 1978 Hornøy 3, bnr 66 Avdeling Alta
- 1978 Marina 1, bnr 67 Avdeling Alta

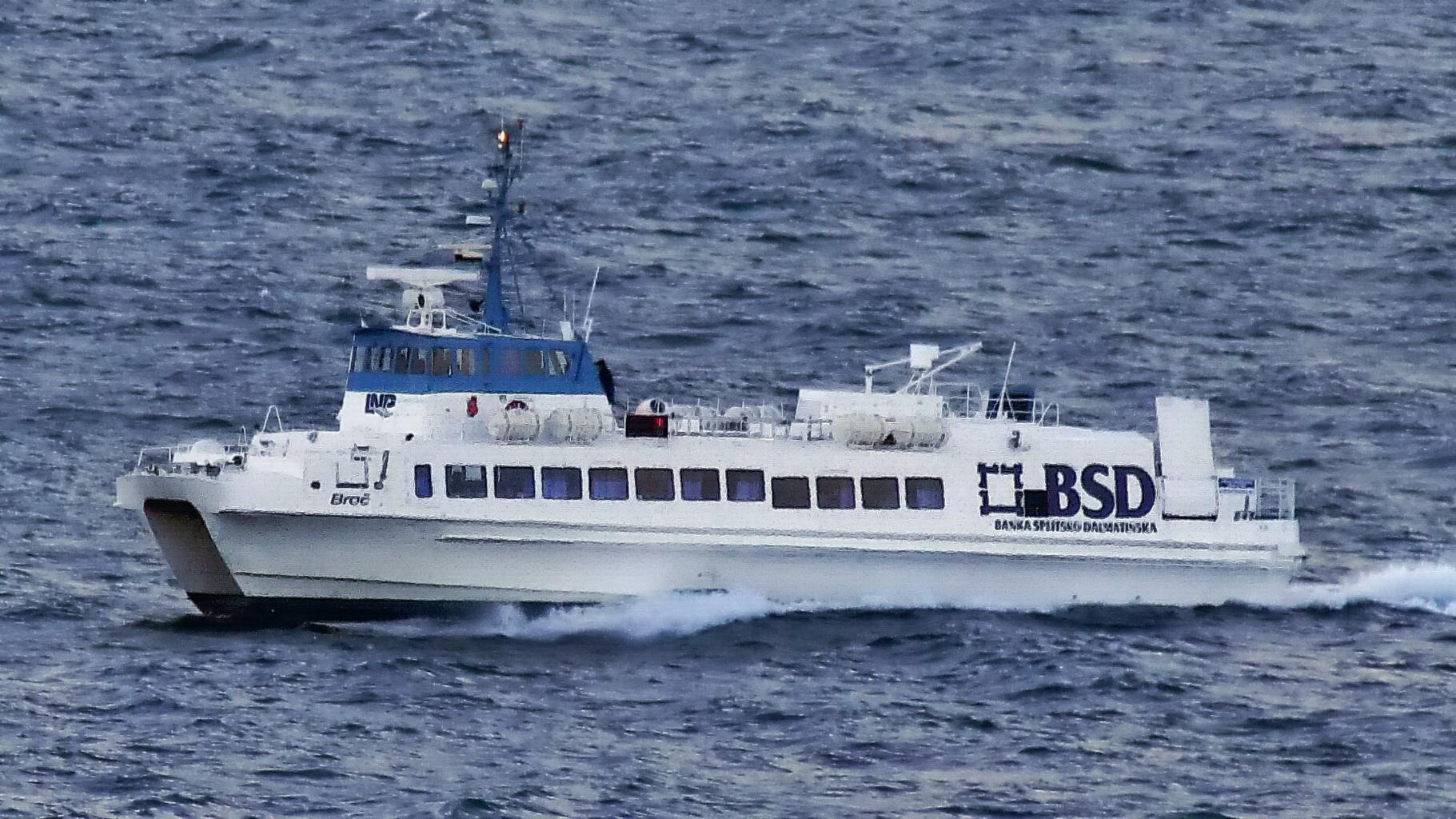
Broč (former Sunnhordland, bnr 38), a Westamaran Type W95, built in 1975, still operating in Croatia (photo taken on Mar 19, 2013)

W95:

- 1974 Vingtor, bnr 36
- 1974 Sleipner, bnr37
- 1975 Sunnhordland, bnr 38
- 1975 Martini Bianco, bnr 40
- 1975 Westjet, bnr 43
- 1977 Draupner, bnr 51
- 1977 Tunen, bnr 52
- 1977 Tranen, bnr 53
- 1977 Pegasus
- 1979 Tumleren
- 1981 Alisur Amarillo, bnr 79
- 1981 Tromsprinsen, bnr 80
- 1981 Celestina, bnr 81, Avdeling Alta
- 1982 Venture 83, bnr 83
- 1982 Venture 84, bnr 84

W88:

- 1981 Haugesund, bnr 78, Avdeling Alta
- 1981 Midthordaland, bnr 82
- 1985 Skogøy
- 1986 Fjordsol
- 1993 Judabrandonal, bnr 92

W100:

- 1980 Condor 6, bnr 75
- 1981 Gimle Bird, bnr 76
- 1981 Gimle Bay, bnr 77

W5000:

- 1987 Anne-Lise, bnr 92
