= HNoMS Nasty =

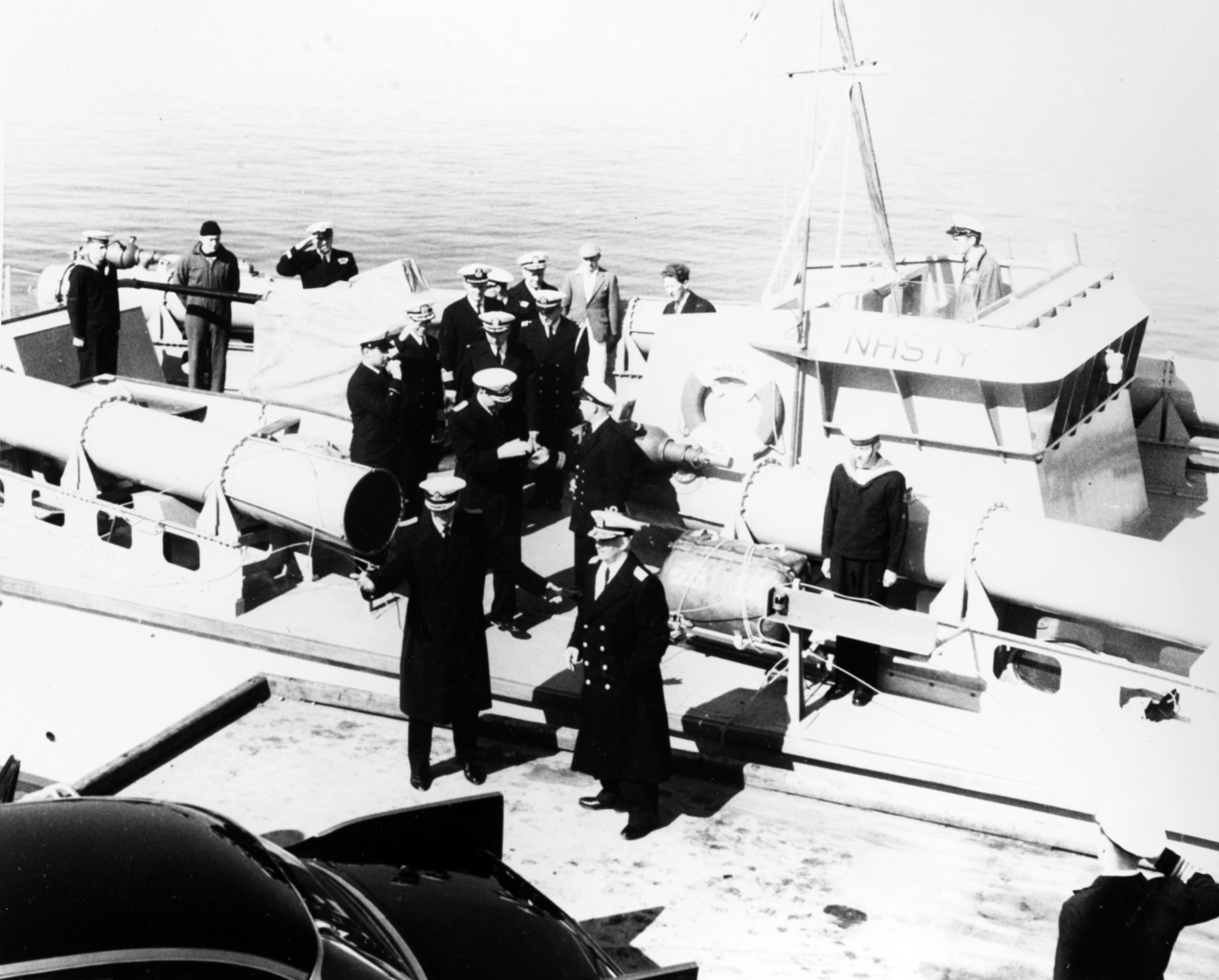
- Norwegian patrol boat Nasty

History

Norway
- Name: HNoMS Nasty
- Builder: Westermoen Båtbyggeri, Mandal
- Launched: 1958
- Identification: Pennant number: P
- Fate: Stricken, 1967

General characteristics
- Type: Motor Torpedo Boat
- Displacement: 69 long tons (70 t) (standard) 76 long tons (77 t) (full load)
- Length: 24.5 m (80 ft 5 in)
- Beam: 7.5 m (24 ft 7 in)
- Draught: 2.1 m (6 ft 11 in)
- Propulsion: 2 × Napier Deltic diesel engines, 5,000 bhp (3,728 kW) 2 × shaft
- Speed: 43 knots (49 mph; 80 km/h)
- Complement: 22 men (Norwegian Navy)
- Armament: 2 × Bofors 40 mm gun; 4 × 21 in (533 mm) torpedo tubes

HNoMS Nasty was a fast attack craft of the Royal Norwegian Navy, built as a private venture by Westermoen Båtbyggeri of Mandal, Norway. Designed by Jan Herman Linge she was an experimental craft, of wooden hull construction, launched in 1958. Nasty served with the Royal Norwegian Navy and was the prototype for the navies Tjeld class patrol boats. Boats to Nasty's design were also built for the US and German navies. Nasty was stricken in 1967.
