= Tjeld-class patrol boat =

Royal Norwegian Naval patrol boats

- Tjeld-class patrol boat HNoMS Gribb (P388)

Class overview
- Operators: Royal Norwegian Navy
- Built: 1959–1966
- In commission: 1960–1995
- Completed: 20 (1st group 12, 2nd group 8)

General characteristics
- Type: Patrol boat
- Displacement: 70 long tons (71 t) (standard) 76 long tons (77 t) (full load)
- Length: 24.5 m (80 ft 5 in)
- Beam: 7.5 m (24 ft 7 in)
- Draught: 2.1 m (6 ft 11 in)
- Propulsion: 2 × Napier Deltic Turbo-charged diesel engines, 6,200 hp (4,623 kW) 2 x shafts
- Speed: 45 knots (52 mph; 83 km/h)
- Range: 450 nm at 40 kn, 1600 nm at 25 kn
- Complement: 22 men
- Armament: 1 × Bofors 40 mm gun; 1 × 20 mm Rheinmetall gun; 4 × 21 in (533 mm) torpedo tubes

The Tjeld class was a class of twenty fast patrol boats designed and built for the Royal Norwegian Navy in the late 1950s. They were used as torpedo boats in Norway, where this type of vessel were called MTBs or motor torpedo boats (motortorpedobåt). They remained in service until the late 1970s, when they were placed in reserve; all were stricken by 1995.

== Construction ==
The Tjeld class was based on a prototype fast patrol boat, the Nasty, developed and introduced as a private venture by Boat Services Ltd. A/S, Oslo, in close cooperation with Royal Norwegian Navy officers with World War II experience in fast patrol boats; the chief designer being naval architect Jan Herman Linge.

The Norwegian Tjeld-class vessels were constructed at Westermoen Båtbyggeri in Mandal. The first group of twelve vessels was ordered in 1957, launched between 1959 and 1960, and commissioned in 1960–1962. A second group of eight vessels was ordered in 1962, launched 1962-63, and commissioned 1963–66.

The design was also marketed abroad, to the then-West German Navy and the U.S. Navy, where they were known as the Nasty class, and to the Hellenic Navy as the Tjeld, or Improved Nasty type.

The U.S. Navy operated twenty of the United States Nasty-class patrol boats, with pennant numbers PTF-3 through PTF-22, primarily in the conduct of riverine warfare during the Vietnam War. A subsequent improved version, the Osprey class, was larger with aluminum instead of wooden hulls, of which four were operated by the U.S.Navy, PTF-23 through PTF-26. Many examples were later transferred to and operated by Naval Reserve units in the 1970s and 1980s, until phased out of service. A handful survive as museum articles, either restored or currently undergoing restoration.

== Service history ==
The twenty Tjeld class vessels remained in service until the late 1970s; Skarv was stricken in 1978 as were six others in 1979, the remainder being laid up in reserve. All vessels had been disposed of by 1995.

All the vessels of the first group were named after seabirds; those of the second group were named for fish or sea mammals. Some of the boats were later renamed, as the bird names were going to be used for the Hauk-class patrol boat. These boats took over the names of other Tjeld-class vessels, which had been sold in 1981.

== List of vessels ==
=== First group ===
| Name | Pennant number | Date of launch | Delivery date | Builder | Notes |
|---|---|---|---|---|---|
| Tjeld ("oystercatcher") | P343 | | 25 June 1960 | Westermoen | Renamed Sel 1977. Transferred to Naval Reserve and used by Sea Home Guard. Sold for scrapping 1992. |
| Skarv (cormorant) | P344 | | 15 October 1960 | Westermoen | Sold 1981 |
| Teist (black guillemot) | P345 | | 7 February 1961 | Westermoen | Sold 1981 |
| Jo (skua) | P346 | | 17 February 1961 | Westermoen | Sold 1981 |
| Lom (common murre) | P347 | | 28 March 1961 | Westermoen | Sold 1981 |
| Stegg (male grouse) | P348 | | 28 April 1961 | Westermoen | Renamed Hval 1977. Transferred to Naval Reserve and used by Sea Home Guard. Sold for scrapping 1992 |
| Hauk (hawk) | P349 | | 30 June 1961 | Westermoen | Renamed Laks. Transferred to Naval Reserve and used by Sea Home Guard. Sold for scrapping 1992. |
| Falk (falcon) | P350 | | 14 September 1961 | Westermoen | Sold 1981 |
| Ravn (raven) | P357 | | 8 December 1961 | Westermoen | Renamed Knurr 1977. Transferred to Naval Reserve and used by Sea Home Guard. Sold for scrapping 1992. |
| Gribb (vulture) | P388 | | 5 March 1962 | Westermoen | Renamed Delfin. Transferred to Naval Reserve and used by Sea Home Guard. Was planned to be preserved by Kværner Mandal A/S, but later sold for scrapping. |
| Geir (great auk) | P389 | | 13 April 1962 | Westermoen | Stricken 1981. Sold to Stapletask Ltd, Sittingbourne, Kent, England. |
| Erle (wagtail) | P390 | | 6 July 1962 | Westermoen | Sold 1981 |

=== Second group ===
| Name | Pennant number | Date of launch | Delivery date | Builder | Notes |
|---|---|---|---|---|---|
| Skrei (cod) | P380 | | 14 January 1966 | Westermoen | Transferred to Naval Reserve and used by Sea Home Guard. Transferred to the Royal Norwegian Navy Museum and preserved as a museum ship. |
| Hai (shark) | P381 | | July 1964 | Westermoen | Transferred to Naval Reserve and used by Sea Home Guard. Plans are currently underway for Hai to be preserved as a museum ship in Fredrikstad. |
| Sel (seal) | P382 | | | Westermoen | Sold 1981 |
| Hval (whale) | P383 | | 19 March 1964 | Westermoen | Sold 1981 |
| Laks (salmon) | P384 | | 15 May 1964 | Westermoen | Sold 1981 to Stapletask Ltd, Sittingbourne, Kent - Now moored in Great Wakering, Essex, England and has been restored and converted into a house boat (2017) |
| Knurr (grey gurnard) | P385 | | 1 November 1964 | Westermoen | Sold 1981 |
| Delfin (dolphin) | P386 | | 20 May 1966 | Westermoen | 1984 Transferred to Naval Reserve and used by Sea Home Guard. Transferred to the Royal Norwegian Navy Museum and preserved as a museum ship. |
| Lyr (pollock) | P387 | | 1 February 1965 | Westermoen | Transferred to Naval Reserve and used by Sea Home Guard. Sold for scrapping 1992. |
