= Westermoen Båtbyggeri og Mek Verksted =

Coordinates: 58°1′29″N 7°27′31″E

A/S Westermoen Båtbyggeri og Mek Verksted
- Industry: Shipbuilding
- Headquarters: Mandal, Norway
- Key people: Toralf Westermoen

A/S Westermoen Båtbyggeri og Mek Verksted was a shipyard located in Mandal, Norway. Under the leadership of Toralf Westermoen in the 1950s, the yard has produced a long range of high speed boat types, such as:

- The Tjeld-class patrol boat, from 1957
- The Storm-class patrol boat, from 1963

Jan Herman Linge, later famous as designer of many sailboats and other recreational vessel, served as head engineer from 1949 to 1956, and was responsible for the design of the Tjeld class.

== See also ==
- Westamarin
- Kværner Båtservice
