= USS The Sullivans (DD-537) =

Fletcher-class destroyer

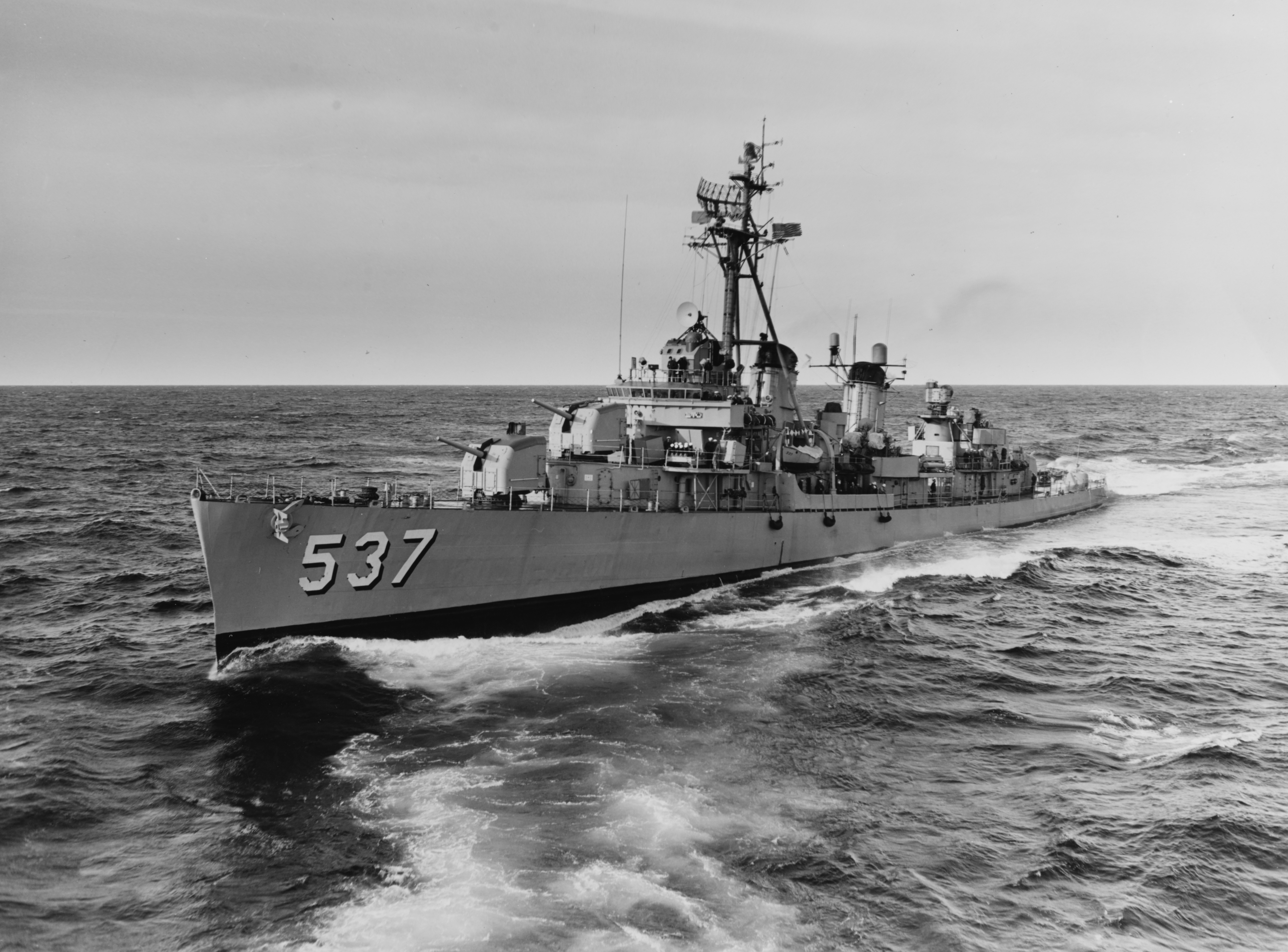
- USS The Sullivans on 29 October 1962

History
- Name: The Sullivans
- Namesake: The Sullivan brothers
- Builder: Bethlehem Shipbuilding Corporation
- Laid down: 10 October 1942
- Launched: 4 April 1943
- Sponsored by: Mrs. Thomas F. Sullivan
- Commissioned: 30 September 1943
- Decommissioned: 7 January 1965
- Stricken: 1 December 1974
- Identification: Call sign: NIDU; Hull number: DD-537
- Motto: We Stick Together
- Honors and awards: See Awards
- Status: Museum ship at Buffalo Naval & Military Park
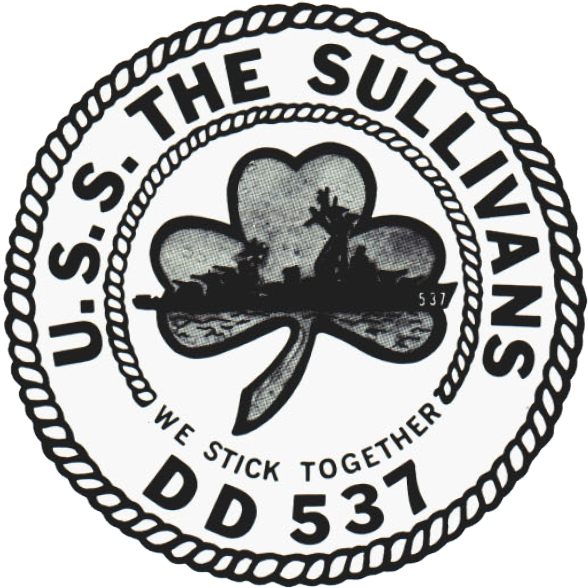
- Badge

General characteristics
- Class & type: Fletcher-class destroyer
- Displacement: 2,050 long tons (2,080 t)
- Length: 376 ft 6 in (114.76 m)
- Beam: 39 ft 8 in (12.09 m)
- Draft: 17 ft 9 in (5.41 m)
- Installed power: 4 × oil-fired Babcock & Wilcox boilers; 60,000 shp (45,000 kW)
- Propulsion: 2 × General Electric-geared steam turbines; 2 × shafts
- Speed: 35 knots (65 km/h; 40 mph)
- Range: 6,500 nmi (12,000 km; 7,500 mi) at 15 kilometres (9.3 mi)
- Complement: 336
- Armament: (as built); 5 × 5 in (130 mm)/38-caliber guns, 10 × 40 mm (1.6 in) Bofors AA guns (5 × 2), 7 × 20 mm (0.79 in) Oerlikon AA cannons (7 × 1), 10 × 21 in (530 mm) torpedo tubes (2 × 5), 6 × K-gun depth charge throwers, 2 × depth charge tracks; (as preserved); 4 × 5 in/38 caliber guns, 2 × 3 in (76 mm)/50-caliber guns (1 × 2), 4 × 40 mm Bofors AA guns (2 × 2), 4 × 20 mm Oerlikon AA cannons (2 × 2), 2 × Mark 32 triple torpedo tubes, 2 × Hedgehog, 1 × depth charge track
- USS The Sullivans (DD-537)
- U.S. National Register of Historic Places
- U.S. National Historic Landmark
- New York State Register of Historic Places
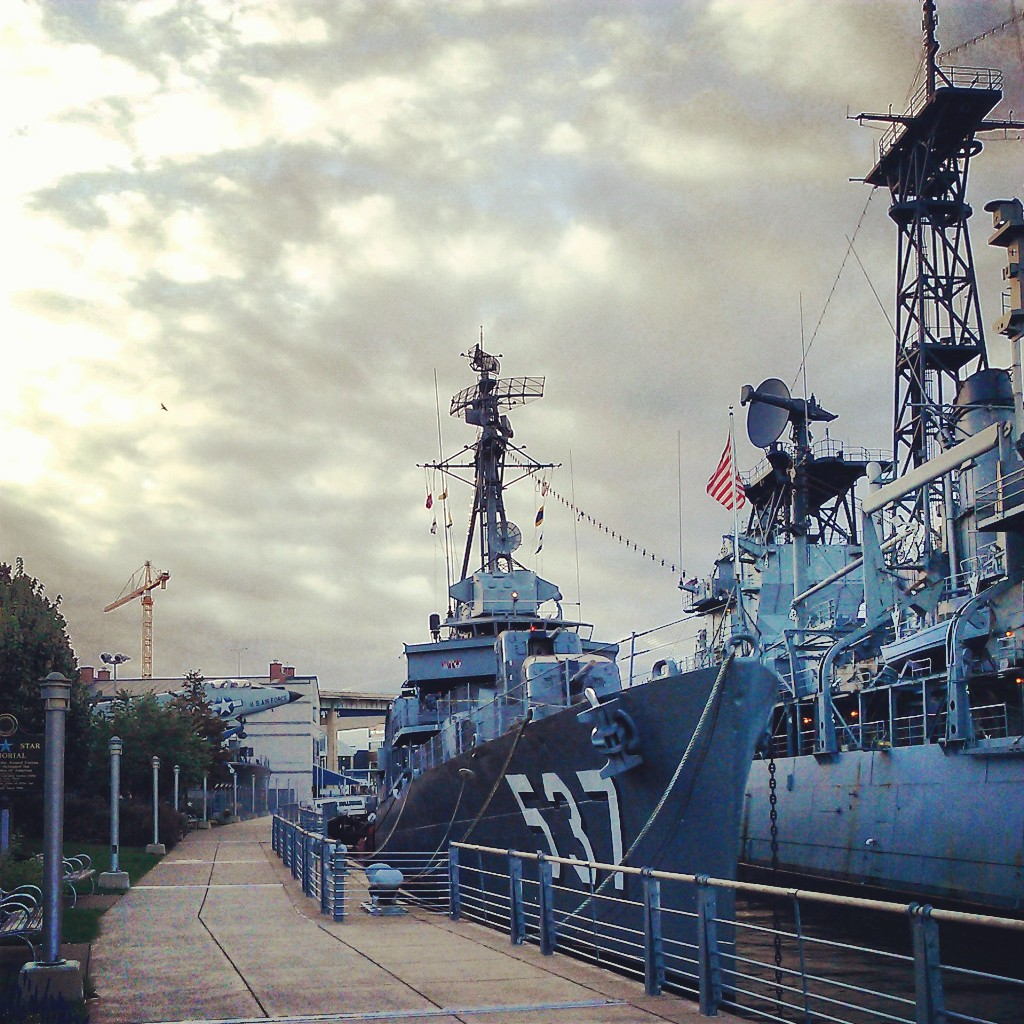

- Location within New York
- Location: Buffalo and Erie County Naval & Military Park, Buffalo, New York
- Coordinates: 42°52′40″N 78°52′50″W
- NRHP reference No.: 86000085
- NYSRHP No.: 02940.006336

Significant dates
- Added to NRHP: 14 January 1986
- Designated NHL: 14 January 1986
- Designated NYSRHP: 14 January 1986

USS The Sullivans (DD-537) is a retired United States Navy Fletcher-class destroyer. The ship was named in honor of the five Sullivan brothers (George, Francis, Joseph, Madison, and Albert) aged 20 to 27 who died when the light cruiser, USS Juneau, was sunk by a Japanese submarine during the Naval Battle of Guadalcanal on 13 November 1942. This was the greatest military loss by any one American family during World War II. She was also the first ship commissioned in the Navy that honored more than one person.

After service in both World War II and the Korean War, The Sullivans was assigned to the 6th Fleet and was a training ship until she was decommissioned on 7 January 1965.

In 1977, she and cruiser USS Little Rock were processed for donation to the Buffalo and Erie County Naval & Military Park in Buffalo, New York. The ship now serves as a memorial museum ship and is open for public tours. On 13 April 2022, the USS The Sullivans partially sank from a severe hull breach.

== Construction and career ==
The Sullivans was originally laid down as Putnam on 10 October 1942, at San Francisco by the Bethlehem Shipbuilding Corporation. She was initially renamed Sullivan until President Franklin Roosevelt changed the name to The Sullivans to clarify that the name honored all five Sullivan brothers. The name was made official on 6 February 1943, and launched 4 April 1943. The ship was sponsored by Mrs. Thomas F. Sullivan, the mother of the five Sullivan brothers. The Sullivans was commissioned on 30 September 1943.

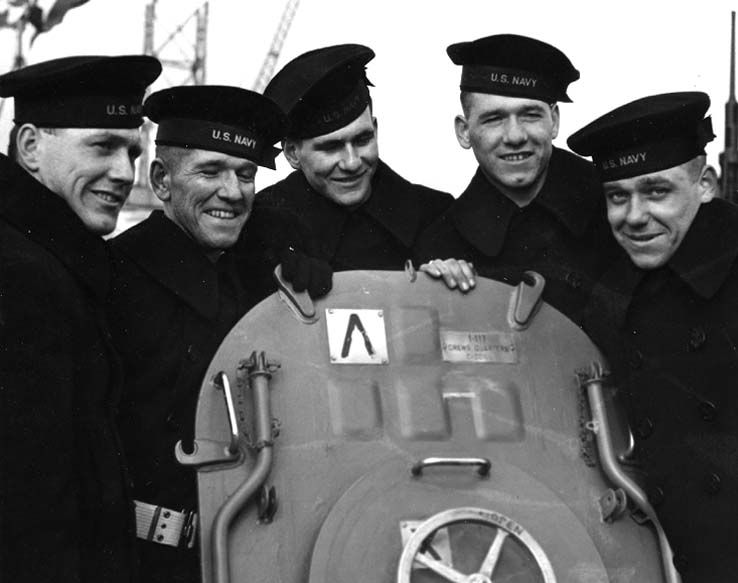
The Sullivan brothers on board the cruiser USS Juneau on her commissioning date, 14 February 1942 (sunk 13 November 1942). From left to right: Joseph, Francis, Albert, Madison, and George Sullivan

=== 1944 ===
Following a shakedown cruise, The Sullivans got underway with sister ships Dortch and Gatling on 23 December 1943. The group arrived at Pearl Harbor five days later. During training operations in Hawaiian waters, the ship was assigned to Destroyer Squadron (DesRon) 52. On 16 January 1944, she steamed out of Pearl Harbor with Task Group 58.2 (TG 58.2) bound for the Marshall Islands. En route to Kwajalein Atoll the group was joined by Battleship Division 9 (BatDiv 9). Two days later, as the American warships neared their target, picket destroyers were sent ahead to protect the main force from the enemy. On 24 January, TG 58.2 arrived at the dawn launching point for air strikes against Roi. For two days, The Sullivans screened USS Essex, Intrepid, and Cabot as they launched nearly continuous aerial raids. Thereafter, the destroyer continued her operations to the north and northwest of Roi and Namur Islands throughout the Battle of Kwajalein until 4 February, when TG 58.2 retired to Majuro to refuel and replenish.

Underway at noon on the 12th, The Sullivans screened (protected) the sortie of Task Group 58.2, as part of Task Force 58's raid on Truk. The same carriers—Essex, Intrepid, and Cabot—whose planes had attacked Roi and Namur steamed in the van now headed for the Japanese fortress-base in the Central Pacific. From the time the group arrived at its launching point on 16 February, the carriers launched what seemed to be nearly continuous air strikes against Truk. "No enemy opposition of any kind was encountered," wrote The Sullivans' commander, "indicating that the initial attacks came as a complete surprise."

While the enemy may have been slow to react at the outset, they soon struck back—torpedoing Intrepid at 00:10 on the 17th. The carrier slowed to 20 knots (37 km/h; 23 mph) and lost steering control. The Sullivans, Owen, and Stembel stood by the stricken carrier and escorted her to Majuro for repairs. Reaching Majuro on 21 February, the destroyer soon sailed on to Hawaii, arriving at Pearl Harbor on 4 March for drydocking and upkeep.

Underway again on the 22nd, The Sullivans covered the sortie of Task Groups 58.2, 58.9, and 50.15 from Majuro, bound for the Palaus, Yap, and Woleai Islands. On the evening of the 29th, while the American warships were approaching the target area, enemy aircraft attacked but were driven off by the anti-aircraft fire from the ships. The next day, The Sullivans screened the carriers during air strikes and that evening helped to beat off a Japanese air attack.

After returning to Majuro for replenishment, the warship screened TG 58.2 during air strikes on Hollandia (currently known as Jayapura), Tanahmerah, Wakde, and Aitape to support amphibious operations on New Guinea. Late in April, The Sullivans participated in support of air strikes on the Japanese base at Truk. On the 29th during one of these raids, the Japanese retaliated with a low-level air attack. American radar picked up four Japanese planes 16 miles (26 km) away, coming in fast at altitudes varying from 10 to 500 feet (150 m). When the planes came within range, The Sullivans opened up with one 40-millimeter twin mount and all five 5-inch (130 mm) guns. Two aircraft splashed into the sea due to the firing of the American ships, and one crossing ahead of The Sullivans was taken under fire and crashed in flames off her port beam.

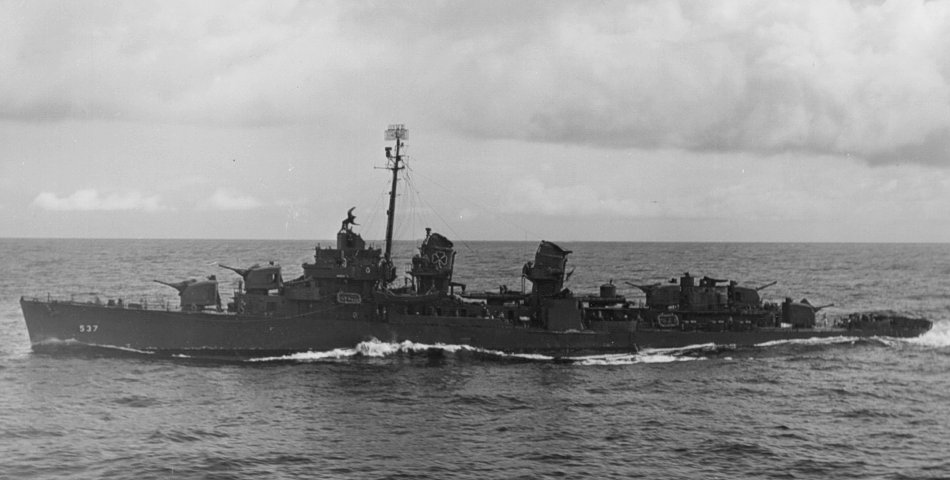
The Sullivans off Ponape, 2 May 1944

The Sullivans arrived off the northwest coast of Ponape on the afternoon of 1 May and provided cover for the battleships led by Iowa which bombarded the island. From the disengaged side of the screen, The Sullivans fired 18 rounds from extreme range at Tumu Point. She then noted three beached Japanese landing barges and shifted her fire to them. However, she received the general cease-fire order shortly thereafter.

During the task unit's retirement, The Sullivans refueled from Yorktown and arrived at Majuro on 4 May. Ten days later, TG 58.2 sortied again, bound for Marcus and Wake Islands. Launching the first raid at 08:00 on the 19th, the American carriers kept up nearly continuous air strikes with no enemy interruptions for three days. En route back to Majuro, The Sullivans and her sister destroyers conducted a thorough but unsuccessful search for a suspected submarine.

On 6 June, The Sullivans got underway again, bound for Saipan, Tinian, and Guam to screen carriers in conducting air strikes. On occasion while in the screen, The Sullivans' radar picked up enemy "snoopers" around the periphery of the formation—and before dawn at 03:15 on the 12th, TG 58.2 shot down one in flames.

The second day's strikes against Saipan took place on the 13th to support the American landings there. Assigned to the duty of communication-linking station between task forces, The Sullivans remained within visual sighting distance of both TG's 58.1 and 58.2 during the day. That day, she picked up 31 Japanese merchant seamen after their ship had been sunk offshore and transferred these prisoners to flagship Indianapolis.

On 19 June 1944, during the first day of the Battle of the Philippine Sea, Japanese aircraft attacked the task group. The Sullivans picked up a plane visually at a range of less than five miles (8 km). "Judies", diving from 23,000 feet (7,000 m), pressed home their attacks. One, taken under fire by The Sullivans, took tracer fire from the ship's 20- and 40-millimeter batteries and, moments later, crashed just short of the horizon. American air attacks against Pagan Island, made without enemy retaliation, topped off the Saipan-Tinian-Guam strikes; and The Sullivans proceeded with TG 58.2 to Eniwetok for upkeep.

Underway on 30 June, The Sullivans resumed work in the screen of carriers launching air strikes to support operations against Saipan and Tinian. During this action, The Sullivans served as fighter direction ship for TU 58.2.4.

On Independence Day, The Sullivans joined Bombardment Unit One (TU 58.2.4) to conduct a shore bombardment of airfields, shore batteries, and other installations on the west coast of Iwo Jima. The heavy ships in the group opened fire at 15:00, and smoke and dust soon obscured targets along the western shore of the island, making spotting difficult. The Sullivans, second ship in a column of destroyers, opened fire at 15:48 on planes parked on the southern airstrip. After three ranging salvos, the ship commenced hitting twin-engined "Bettys" parked in revetments along the strip. The Sullivans destroyed five planes, and shrapnel and burning gasoline likely damaged eight other planes. Minutes later, an enemy ship resembling an LST came under The Sullivans' gunfire and caught fire astern. While Miller closed to complete the destruction of the enemy vessel, The Sullivans and the remainder of the bombardment unit retired and rejoined TG 58.2.

From 7 to 22 July, TG 58.2 operated south and west of the Marianas, conducting daily air strikes on Guam and Rota Islands before returning to Garapan Anchorage, Saipan, to allow the carriers to replenish bombs. Underway at dawn on the 23d, The Sullivans accompanied the task group as it sped towards the Palaus for air strikes on the 26th and 27th. She joined TG 58.4 for temporary duty on 30 July and continued air strikes until 6 August, when she joined TG 58.7, the heavy bombardment group, and operated with TP 34 until 11 August, when the group returned to Eniwetok for replenishment.

Early in September, as the Navy prepared to take the Palaus, The Sullivans supported neutralizing air strikes against Japanese air bases in the Philippines. At dawn on the 7th, she began radar picket duty for TG 38.2 and continued the task through the strikes of the 9th and 10th. From 18:00 on 12 September, the ships noted an increase in air activity—observing many bogies that merely orbited the formations as snoopers. The carriers conducted further raids on the central Philippines on the 13th and 14th and then shifted course to the north to subject Manila to air attacks commencing on the 21st. Three days later, American planes again hit the central Philippines.

Returning to Tanapag Harbor, Saipan, at dawn on the 28th, The Sullivans went alongside USS Massachusetts (BB-59) for ammunition, provisions, and routine upkeep. However, the cross-swells in the anchorage swept The Sullivans hard against the battleship's steel hide, damaging the destroyer's hull and superstructure. Following brief antisubmarine patrol duty, she proceeded to Ulithi on 1 October.

While undergoing tender repairs alongside Dixie, The Sullivans formed part of a nest of destroyers blown away from the tender during a heavy storm that lashed the anchorage. The Sullivans drifted free downwind and got up steam 'in a hurry'. However, she collided with Uhlmann. Many small boats were being tossed about, and The Sullivans rescued four men from Stockham's gig before it disappeared beneath the waves. As the storm abated on the 4th, the warship returned to Ulithi to complete the abbreviated tender overhaul alongside Dixie.

At 16:15 on 6 October, The Sullivans sortied with the carriers and protected them during raids against targets on Formosa and the Ryukyus. On the evening of the 12th, as the planes returned to the carriers, radar spotted the first of many Japanese aircraft coming down from the north. For the next six hours, approximately 50 to 60 Japanese aircraft subjected the American task force to continuous air attacks. Nearly 45 minutes after sunset, The Sullivans sighted a "Betty", coming in low on the starboard side, and took it under fire. During the next 15 minutes, the formation to which The Sullivans was attached shot down three planes; between 18:56 and 19:54, the destroyer herself took five planes under fire. Varying speed between 18 and 29 knots (54 km/h), the formation undertook eight emergency maneuvers. Again and again, timely turns and the great volume of gunfire thrown up by the ships repulsed the enemy air attacks.

The second phase of the attack began at 21:05 on the 12th and continued through 02:35 on the 13th. The Japanese increased the use of "window" to jam American radar transmissions while their flares lit up the evening with ghostly light. The formation made smoke whenever enemy flare-dropping planes approached, creating an eerie haze effect which helped baffle the enemy pilots. Meanwhile, The Sullivans and the other ships in formation executed 38 simultaneous turn movements at speeds between 22 and 25 knots (46 km/h; 29 mph) as their guns kept up a steady fire to repel the attackers.

The next day, the carriers again launched successful strikes on Formosa. During the ensuing night retirement, the formation again came under attack by Japanese torpedo-carrying "Betties" which struck home this time and damaged Canberra. The Sullivans then helped to protect the damaged cruiser. On the 14th, "Betty" torpedo bombers scored against Houston.The Sullivans soon joined the screen which guarded the two battle-battered cruisers—nicknamed "CripDiv 1"—as they retired toward Ulithi.

Things progressed well until the 16th, when the Japanese mounted a heavy air attack to attempt to finish off cruisers. Houston reeled under the impact of a second hit astern, and The Sullivans opened fire on the "Frances" which had made the attack and splashed the Japanese plane. The Sullivans and Stephen Potter then took a second "Frances" under fire and knocked it down off the bow of Santa Fe.

The Sullivans rescued 118 Houston men and kept them on board until the 18th, when she transferred them to Boston. While the damaged cruisers were making their way to Ulithi, a Japanese surface force attempted to close the formation before TF 38 intervened to drive them back. The Sullivans transferred salvage gear to Houston and helped with the ship's many wounded. For his part in directing the destroyer's rescue and salvage attempts, Comdr. Ralph J. Baum received his first Silver Star.

On 20 October, The Sullivans joined TG 38.2 for scheduled air strikes on the central Philippines in support of the Leyte landings. At dawn of the 24th, reconnaissance located a Japanese surface force south of Mindoro, and the American carriers launched air strikes all day against the enemy warships. That morning, a Japanese air attack developed, and The Sullivans downed an "Oscar" fighter plane.

By 25 October, enemy forces were sighted coming down from the north; TF 34, including The Sullivans, was formed and headed north, following the carrier groups in TF 38. At dawn on the 25th, the carriers launched air strikes to harass the Japanese surface units, now some 60 miles (97 km) north. At 11:00, TF 34 reversed course, topped-off the destroyers with fuel, and formed fast striking group TG 34.5, with Iowa, New Jersey, three light cruisers, The Sullivans, and seven other destroyers. The American force missed the Japanese by three hours, but ran across a straggler and reported sinking an Takao-class cruiser. Japanese records fail to confirm the claim.

After sweeping south along the coast of Samar hunting for enemy "cripples", The Sullivans and other units of TG 34.5 reported back to TG 38.2. The destroyer then remained in the Philippine area, screening the fast carriers and standing by on plane guard duties, through mid-November. At dusk on the 19th, during one of the many air attacks fought off by The Sullivans, the destroyer damaged a "Betty" by gunfire and watched it disappear over the horizon, smoking but stubbornly remaining airborne. Six days later, she had better luck when her guns set a Japanese plane afire and splashed it into the sea. Two days later, her task group returned to Ulithi.

The destroyer undertook training exercises from 8 to 11 December before rejoining TG 38.2 to screen its warships during air strikes on Manila and southern Luzon beginning on 14 December. On the 17th, running low on fuel, The Sullivans commenced refueling but, with the weather worsening minute by minute, she broke off the operation. Typhoon Cobra swept through the Fleet, with the wind clocked at an estimated 115 knots (213 km/h; 132 mph) on the morning of 18 December. Three destroyers were sunk and several ships damaged by the winds and waves. The Sullivans, her "lucky shamrock" painted on her funnel, emerged from the typhoon undamaged and, on the 20th began searching for men lost overboard from other ships. The lingering bad weather resulted in cancellation of air strikes, and The Sullivans retired to Ulithi on Christmas Eve.

=== 1945 ===
After a brief run to Manus and back, escorting Iowa, The Sullivans sortied from Ulithi on 30 December to screen TG 38.2's air strikes on Formosa in support of the American landings on Luzon. Heavy seas forced a three-day postponement of a high-speed thrust toward the target originally planned for the night of 6 January 1945. During the evening of the 9th, the task force passed through the Bashi Channel and entered the South China Sea. Three days later, carrier planes from TG 38.2 swept over Saigon and Camranh Bay, Indochina, hammering at whatever enemy merchantmen they found.

Soon after the conclusion of the air strikes, a bombardment group, TG 34.5, was formed to go after possible "cripples" and dispatch them by surface gunfire. Accordingly, two battleships, two heavy cruisers, three light cruisers, and 15 destroyers raced into Camranh Bay but found it devoid of Japanese shipping. Throughout the day, however, carrier pilots had better luck and enjoyed a veritable "field day" with coastal marus. During subsequent air strikes on Hainan Island, Hong Kong, and Formosa, The Sullivans served on radar picket duty 10 miles (16 km) ahead of the task group.

A brief respite for upkeep at Ulithi in late January preceded the ship's deployment with TG 58.2, covering the carriers as they launched devastating air strikes against the Japanese homeland itself, hitting Tokyo and other targets on Honshū on 16 and 17 February. From the 18th through the 21st, American carrier-based air power struck at Japanese positions contesting the landings on Iwo Jima. More strikes were scheduled for Tokyo four days later, but bad weather forced their cancellation. Retiring from the area, TF 58 fueled and commenced a high-speed run at Okinawa at noon on 28 February. Later that day, The Sullivans sighted and destroyed a drifting mine. At dawn on 1 March, Hellcats, Avengers, Dauntlesses, and Helldivers attacked Japanese positions on Okinawa. The ships of the task force encountered no enemy opposition from sea or sky and soon retired towards Ulithi.

The Sullivans sortied 12 days later, bound for Kyushu and southern Honshū to support the invasion of Okinawa. Once again screening for TG 58.2, The Sullivans stood by as the carriers launched air strikes on 14 March. On 20 March, The Sullivans fueled from Enterprise at 11:52, clearing the carrier's side five minutes later when a kamikaze alert sent the ships scurrying.

At 14:39, The Sullivans commenced maneuvering to go alongside Enterprise again—this time to pick up a part for her FD radar antenna. Soon, however, another enemy air attack scattered the ships. As a line had not yet been thrown across to the carrier, The Sullivans bent on speed and cleared her as other ships in the task group opened fire on the attackers. A Japanese plane came through the antiaircraft fire and crashed into Halsey Powell astern as that destroyer was fueling alongside Hancock. The stricken destroyer lost steering control and started to veer across the big carrier's bow, and only rapid and radical maneuvering on Hancock's part averted a collision.

The Sullivans soon closed Halsey Powell to render emergency assistance. She slowed to a stop 11 minutes later and lowered her motor whaleboat to transfer her medical officer and a pharmacist's mate to Halsey Powell, when another kamikaze came out of the skies, apparently bent on crashing into The Sullivans. At 16:10, the destroyer's radar picked up the "Zeke" on its approach; and, as soon as the motor whaler was clear of the water, The Sullivans leapt ahead with all engines thrusting at flank speed.

Bringing right full rudder, The Sullivans maneuvered radically while her 20- and 40-millimeter guns sent streams of shells at the "Zeke", which passed 100 feet (30 m) over the masthead and escaped. Meanwhile, Halsey Powell managed to achieve a steady course at five knots; and, with The Sullivans, she retired toward Ulithi. However, their troubles were not yet over. At 10:46 on the following day, 21 March, The Sullivans picked up a plane, closing from 15 miles (24 km). Visually identified as a twin-engined "Frances", the aircraft was taken under fire at 10,000 yards (9,100 m) by The Sullivans' 5-inch battery. Halsey Powell joined in too; and, within a few moments, the "Frances" crashed into the sea about 3,000 yards (2,700 m) abeam of The Sullivans. At 12:50, a combat air patrol (CAP) Hellcat from Yorktown, under direction by Halsey Powell, splashed another "Frances". At 13:20, a CAP Hellcat from Intrepid, directed by The Sullivans, downed a "Nick" or "Dinah".

On 25 March, The Sullivans and Halsey Powell arrived at Ulithi, the former for upkeep prior to training exercises and the latter for battle repairs.

The warship next rendezvoused with TF 58 off Okinawa and guarded the carriers supporting the landings on the island. While operating on radar picket duty on the 15th, the ship came under enemy air attack, but downed one plane and emerged unscathed. She continued conducting radar picket patrols for the task group, ranging some 12 to 25 miles (40 km) out from the main body of the force. On the afternoon of 29 April, she commenced fueling from Bunker Hill, but a kamikaze alert interrupted the replenishment, forcing The Sullivans to break away from the carrier's side. During the ensuing action, Hazelwood and Haggard were both crashed by kamikazes but survived.

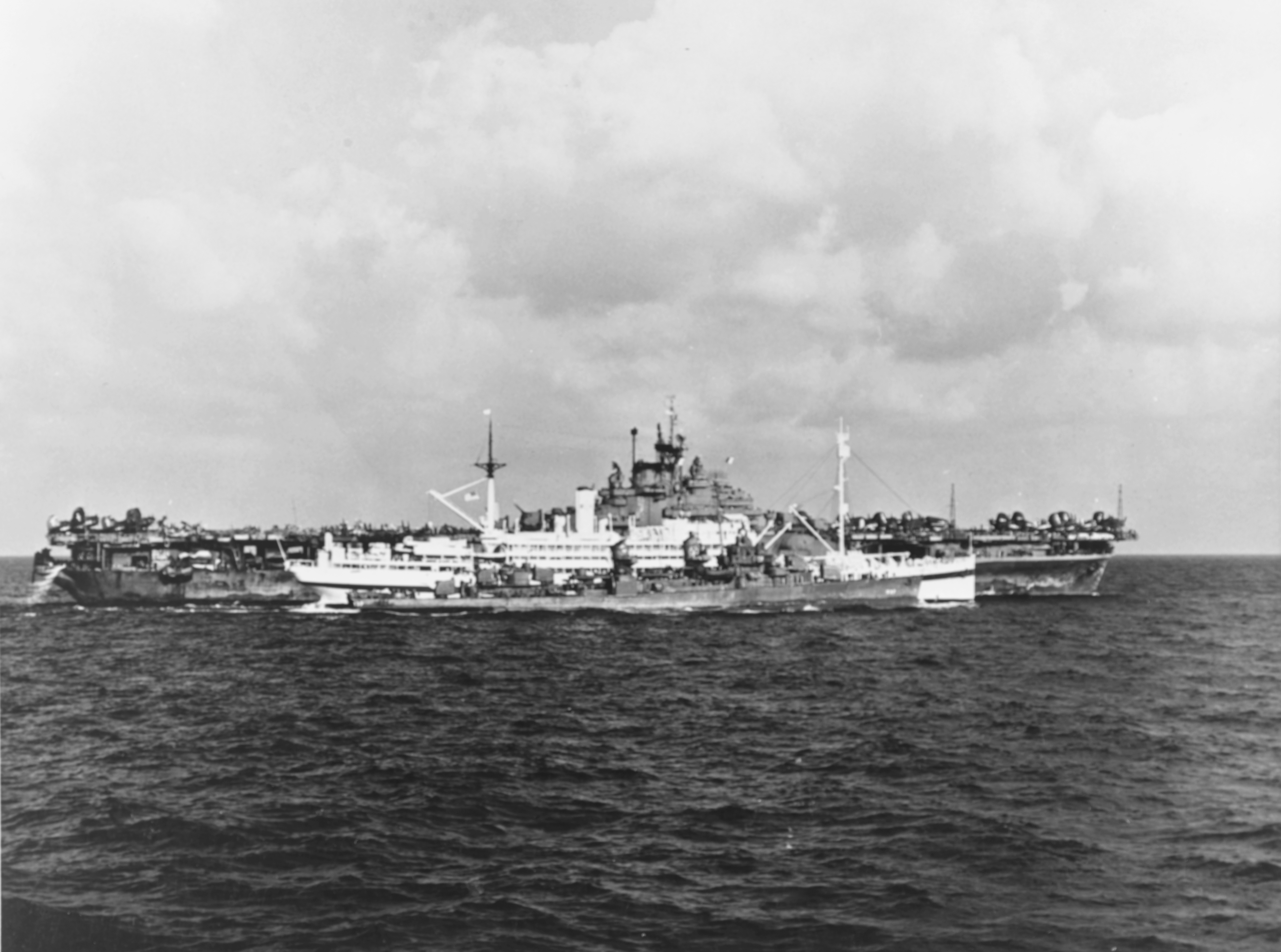
Bountiful taking casualties on board from Bunker Hill on 12 May 1945, one day after the carrier was devastated by a kamikaze attack. The Sullivans is in the foreground.

Kamikazes continued to plague the ships of TG 58.3 as they supported the troops fighting ashore on Okinawa. Everything from landing craft to battleships were targeted. On the morning of 11 May, a kamikaze crashed into Bunker Hill. The Sullivans promptly closed the carrier to render assistance and picked up 166 men forced over the side by the fires that at one point ravaged the ship. After transferring them to ships in TG 50.8 and replenishing her fuel bunkers, she helped to screen TG 58.3 during air strikes on Kyushu.

In a morning air attack three days later, Enterprise was hit by a kamikaze. Four enemy planes were shot down in the melee—one by The Sullivans in what proved to be her last combat action during World War II.

The Sullivans anchored at San Pedro Bay, Leyte Gulf, on 1 June for recreation and upkeep. She departed Leyte on the 20th, bound, via Eniwetok and Pearl Harbor, for the west coast. The destroyer arrived at Mare Island, Calif., on 9 July and, two days later, commenced her overhaul. She thus missed the final fleet activity that closed the war.

Meanwhile, since the return of peace greatly reduced the Navy's need for warships, The Sullivans was decommissioned at San Diego on 10 January 1946—soon after her overhaul was completed—and she was placed in the Pacific Reserve Fleet.

== Korean War service ==
The Sullivans remained decommissioned at San Diego until May 1951, when she began to undergo reactivation. This was due to naval fleet expansion because of the Korean War. She was recommissioned on 6 July 1951. The Sullivans soon headed to her home port in Newport, R.I. by way of the Panama Canal. During the winter of 1951–52, the ship conducted training exercises off the east coast and in the Caribbean. The Sullivans departed Newport on 6 September 1952 bound for Japan. Proceeding via the Panama Canal, San Diego, Pearl Harbor, and Midway she arrived at Sasebo, Japan on 10 October 1952. The next day she got underway to join Task Force 77 off the eastern shores of Korea. Her duties included screening the fast carriers which were launching repeated air strikes to interdict enemy supply lines. She also supported United Nations ground forces who were battling communist forces. The Sullivans remained on this duty until 20 October 1952 when she steamed to Yokosuka, Japan for a brief refit.

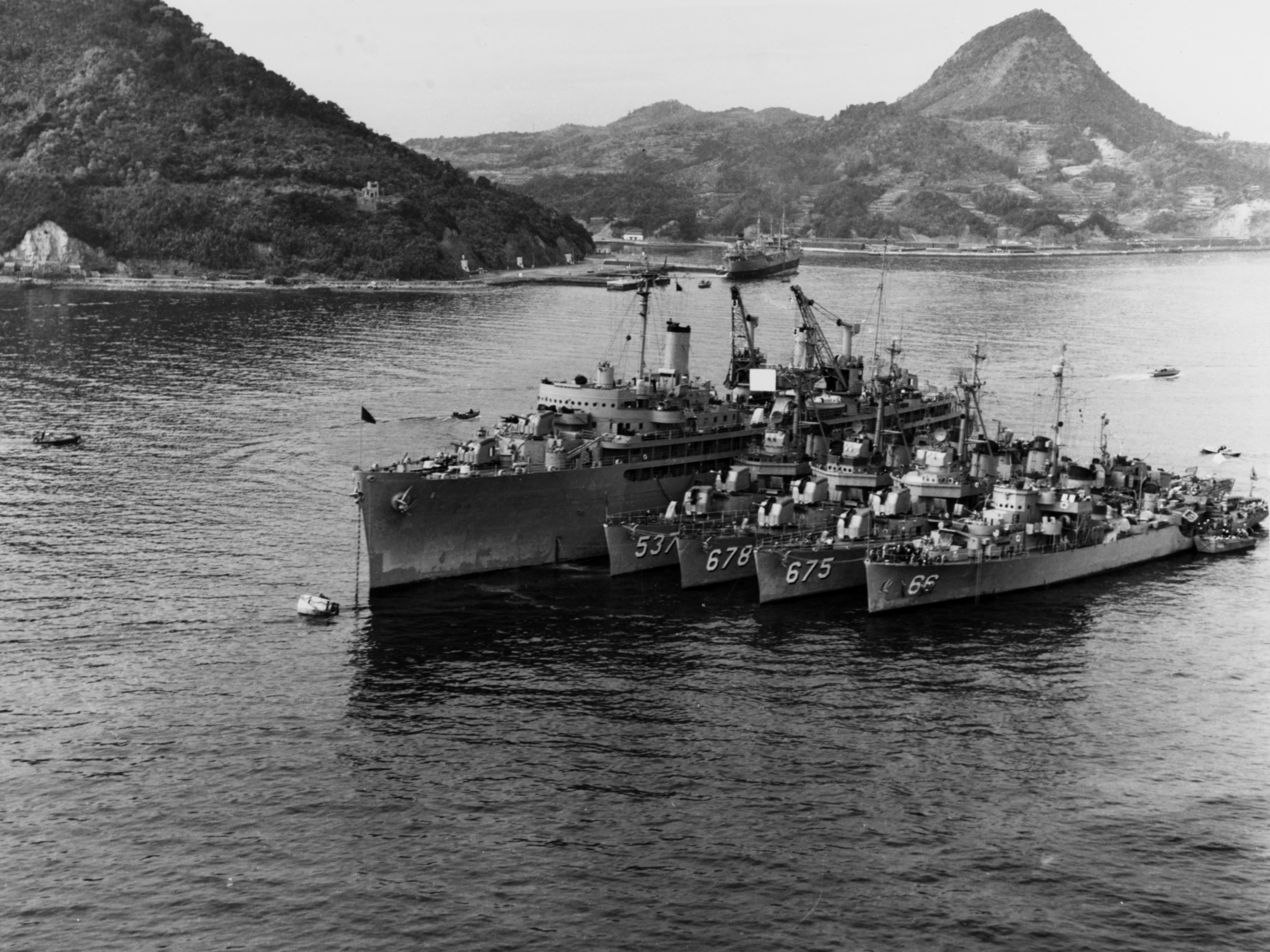
The Sullivans alongside Ajax, December 1952

Following the refit, The Sullivans stopped at Buckner Bay, Okinawa and then proceeded to rejoin Task Force 77. Upon her arrival on 16 November 1952 she resumed screening activities and plane guard duty. She supported the carriers as they made the northernmost stab at North Korean supply lines, approaching within 75 miles (120 km) of the Soviet base at Vladivostok, Russia. MiG-15 fighters approached the task force, but combat air patrol Grumman F9F Panthers downed two of the attackers and damaged a third in history's first engagement between jet fighters over water. The destroyer arrived back at Sasebo, Japan on 5 December 1952. From Sasebo she joined United Nations forces on 14 December 1952 in blockading the Korean coasts. Her mission was to interdict seaborne traffic and bombard shore targets to support United Nations ground troops and interdict enemy supply operations. Arriving in Area "G" the following day, The Sullivans made contact with the enemy on the 16th off Songjin, North Korea which was an important rail terminus and supply center. For the next few days, she bombarded railroad trains and tunnels. She frequently opened fire to destroy railroad rolling stock, depots, and prevented repairs to railroad tracks and buildings.

On Christmas Day 1952, The Sullivans scored direct hits on a railroad bridge while under fire from enemy artillery positions on shore. Fifty rounds from enemy guns failed to touch the ship, although near-misses showered the warship's decks with shell fragments. Counter-battery fire from the ship destroyed at least one of the enemy artillery positions.

The Sullivans was ordered home and departed Yokosuka, Japan on 26 January 1953. On the voyage home the ship called at Buckner Bay, Okinawa; Hong Kong; Subic Bay; Singapore, Colombo, Ceylon; Bombay, India; Bahrain and Aden. The Sullivans then steamed through the Red Sea, transited the Suez Canal, and proceeded to Cannes, France, via Naples. After a brief fueling stop at Gibraltar the warship reached Newport, R.I. on 11 April 1953.

== 6th Fleet deployment ==
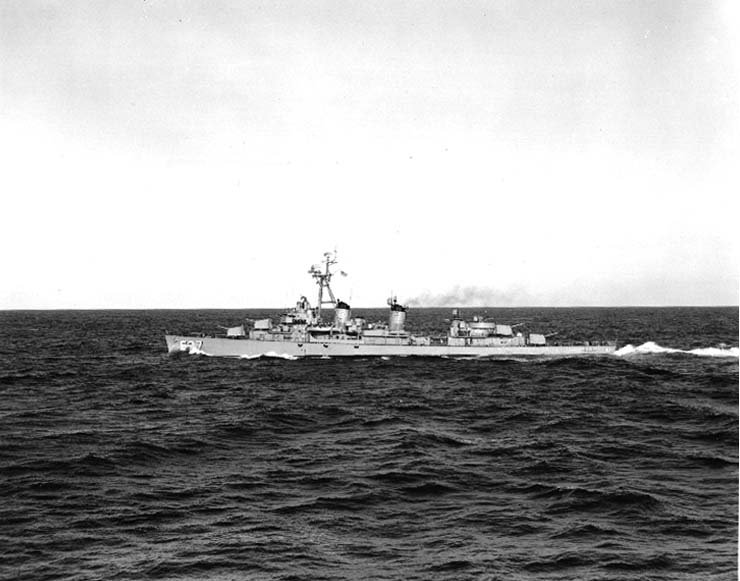
The Sullivans off Newport, Rhode Island, 29 October 1962

The destroyer operated out of her home port well into the summer of 1953, before deploying to the Mediterranean for a tour of duty with the 6th Fleet. She remained on this duty through the end of the year and returned to Newport on 3 February 1954 for operations off the east coast and into the Caribbean through May 1955. She again deployed to European and Mediterranean waters from May to August of that year before returning to Newport late in the summer.

In the years that followed, The Sullivans continued alternating east coast operations with Mediterranean deployments. The summer of 1958 saw a communist threat to the security of Lebanon, and president Dwight D. Eisenhower ordered American ships to land troops there to protect Americans and to help stabilize the tense situation. The Sullivans supported the landings of Marines at Beirut. After their presence had dispelled the crisis, she returned to the United States for a three-month navy yard overhaul and subsequent refresher training at Naval Station Guantanamo Bay, Cuba.

Back at Newport in March 1959, The Sullivans joined a hunter/killer group formed around the aircraft carrier Lake Champlain. Then, after making a midshipman training cruise for USNA and NROTC midshipmen in which she also conducted antisubmarine warfare operations, the destroyer sailed for another Mediterranean deployment which lasted until she returned home in the autumn.

Operations out of Newport occupied The Sullivans until early spring of 1960 when she headed south for ASROC evaluations off Key West, Florida. During this deployment to southern climes, on 31 March and 1 April, the warship helped to rescue five of eleven survivors from a U.S. Air Force KC-97 Stratofreighter(Model F Stratotanker) that had ditched 40 miles off the Florida coast near Cape Canaveral.

Following NATO exercises in September, The Sullivans visited Lisbon, Portugal, prior to a quick trip through the Mediterranean, Suez Canal, and Red Sea, to Karachi, West Pakistan. In late October and into November, she participated in Operation "Midlink III", joint operations with Pakistani, Iranian, and British warships. After returning to the Mediterranean, The Sullivans conducted exercises with the French Navy and with the 6th Fleet and reached home in time for Christmas.

In January 1961, The Sullivans assisted in the sea trials of the nuclear-powered fleet ballistic missile submarine Abraham Lincoln off Portsmouth, New Hampshire, before steaming south and taking part in Operation Springboard. While in the Caribbean, she visited Martinique. Briefly back at Newport early in March, The Sullivans soon returned to the West Indies to support marine landing exercises at Vieques, Puerto Rico.

In April, the ship began intensive training in the waters off Florida to prepare to cover a Project Mercury spaceshot. The Sullivans joined Lake Champlain at Naval Station Mayport, Florida, and took station. On 5 May 1961, Commander Alan Shepard's Mercury space capsule, Freedom 7, passed overhead and splashed down near Lake Champlain and was speedily rescued by helicopters from the carrier. The Sullivans then made a midshipman cruise in June, visiting New York and Halifax, Nova Scotia.

From September 1961 to February 1962, The Sullivans underwent a major overhaul in the Boston Naval Shipyard. She proceeded to Guantanamo Bay soon thereafter to train for duty as a school ship. She subsequently served as a model destroyer in which officer students could see and learn the fundamentals of destroyer operation. In May and again in August, The Sullivans made training cruises to the Caribbean for the Destroyer School.

In October 1962, after Soviet missiles were discovered in Cuba, The Sullivans joined American naval forces blockading the island during negotiations with the Soviet Union over the issue. When the Soviet Government withdrew the strategic weapons, the destroyer returned to Newport.

On 7 January 1963, The Sullivans got underway from Newport bound for the Caribbean and another training cruise. Following her return to Newport, she conducted local operations for the Destroyer School. The tragic loss of nuclear submarine Thresher off Boston on 10 April 1963 caused the destroyer to support emergency investigations of the disaster.

For the remainder of 1963 and into the first few months of 1964, The Sullivans continued to train officer students. On 1 April 1964, the destroyer was transferred to the Naval Reserve Force, and her homeport was changed to New York City. Departing Newport on 13 April, the warship proceeded to New York and took on her selected reserve crew. Her cruises with the reserves embarked were devoted mostly to ASW exercises and took the ship to Canadian ports such as Halifax, Nova Scotia; Saint John, New Brunswick; and Charlottetown, Prince Edward Island, in the north; and to Palm Beach, Florida, in the south.

After the collision of the Australian aircraft carrier Melbourne and destroyer Voyager, which resulted in the sinking of Voyager on 10 February 1964, the United States offered The Sullivans to Australia along with sister ship Twining as a temporary replacement. The Royal Australian Navy instead accepted the British Royal Navy's offer of the Daring-class destroyer Duchess, which was of the same class as Voyager.

== Museum ship ==
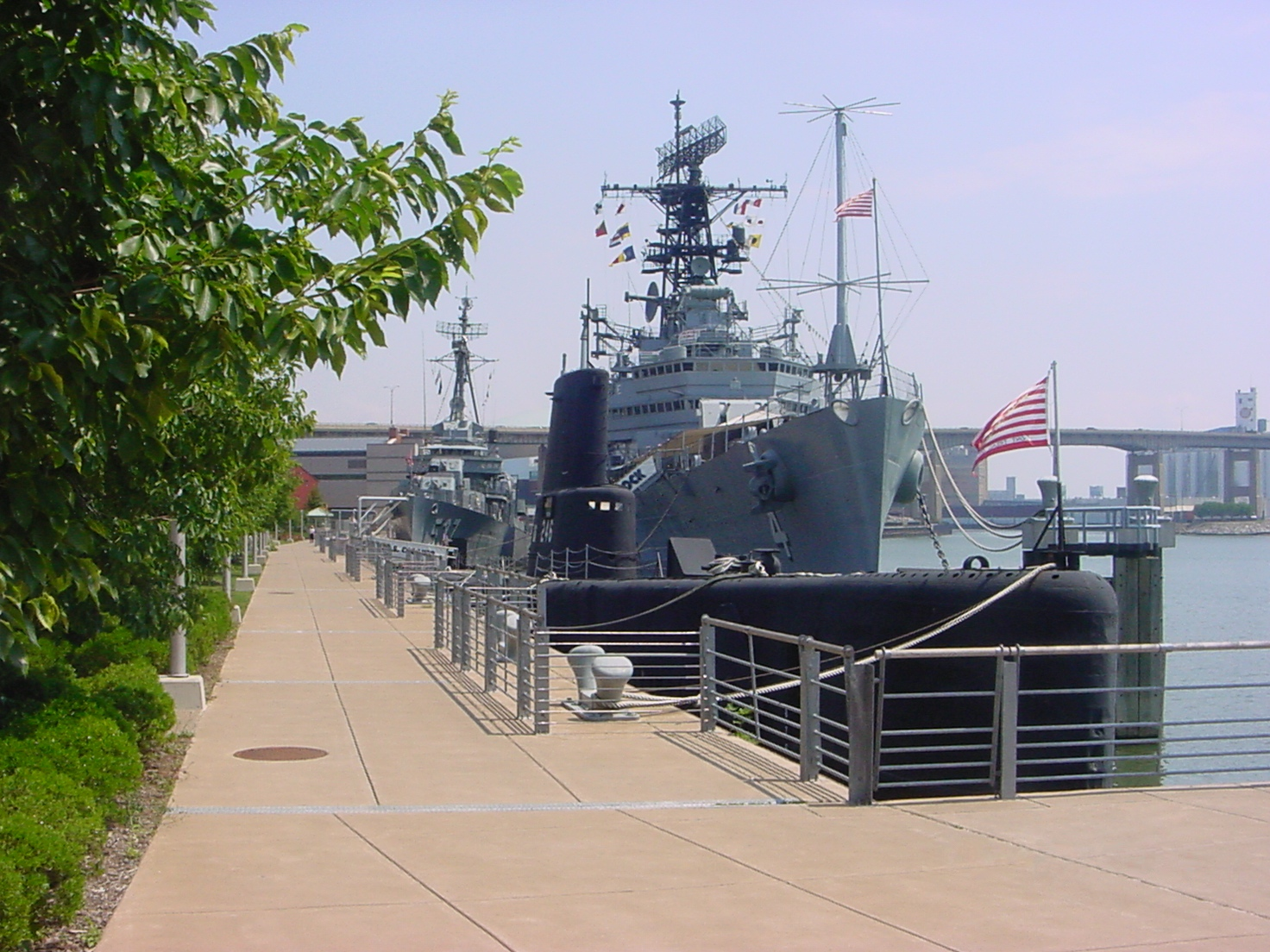
The Sullivans with USS Little Rock and USS Croaker

The Sullivans received nine battle stars for World War II service and two for Korean service. On 7 January 1965, The Sullivans was decommissioned at the Philadelphia Naval Shipyard and she remained in reserve into the 1970s. In 1977, she and cruiser USS Little Rock were processed for donation to the Buffalo and Erie County Naval & Military Park in Buffalo, New York. The ship now serves as a memorial and is open for public tours.

The ship was declared a National Historic Landmark in 1986. On 26 February 2021 it was reported that The Sullivans was taking on water and listing. It was stated that the ship's age and possible weather damage were the most likely cause for the leak below the waterline.

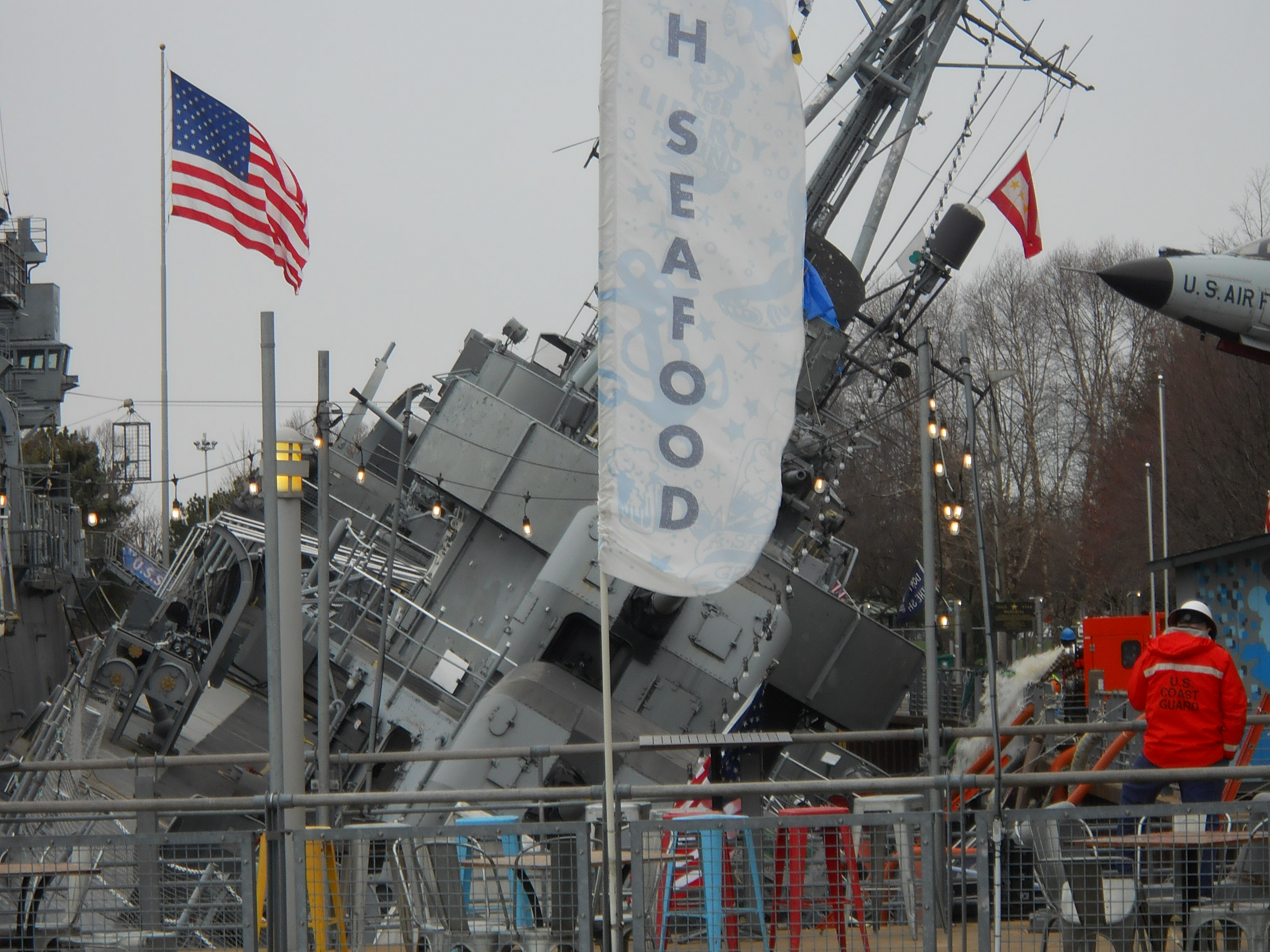
USS The Sullivans on 15 April 2022. A USCG member watches as water is pumped out from her hull.

On 14 April 2022, the ship began to list and appeared to sit lower in the water than usual; crews told a reporter that electrical power to the ship had been lost. A later public statement reported "a serious hull breach" that was under investigation, with part of the ship resting on the riverbed, but still mostly above water. An assessment below deck in May called the damage to the ship's interior considerable.

In August 2022, The Sullivans reopened for visits after repairs.

In summer 2023, the park began work to winterize the ship to protect her. This included adding an improved communications and sensor system to warn of leaks, replacing mooring lines, shoring up bulkheads and replacing gaskets, and adding dehumidifiers and other equipment. The park has plans to drydock the ship by late 2024 in either Erie or Cleveland, but must raise substantial amounts of money to accomplish the move and tow, as well as drydock repairs. Estimates are that at least $10–$12 million is required for the towing.

As of June 2024, the ship's lower decks were closed to visitors and only the main deck and part of the superstructure were open.

== Awards ==
The Sullivans earned nine battle stars in World War II and another two more during the Korean War.

== See also ==
Three other Fletcher-class ships are preserved as memorials:

- USS Cassin Young (DD-793) at Boston, Massachusetts
- USS Kidd (DD-661) at Baton Rouge, Louisiana
- Greek destroyer Velos former USS Charrette at Thessaloniki, Greece
