= Battle of Legareville =

Battle of the American Civil War

Coordinates: 32.665°N 80.014°W

- Part of the American Civil War
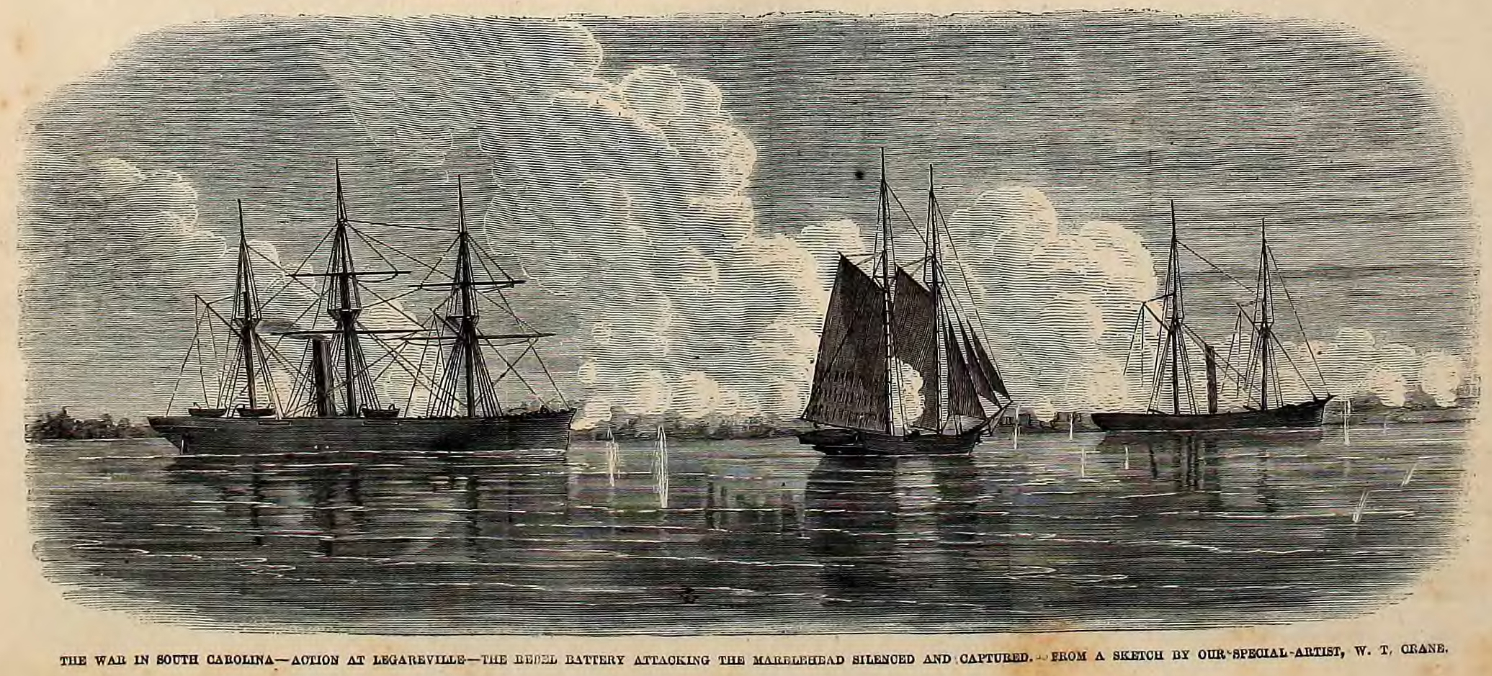
- The rebel battery attacking the Marblehead
Date	December 25, 1863
Location	Johns Island, South Carolina
Result	Inconclusive

Belligerents
United States (Union)	(Confederate States of America) CSA (Confederacy)

Commanders and leaders
Lt. Cdr. Richard W. Meade	Col. Powhatan R. Page; Lt. Col. Delaware B. Kemper

Casualties and losses
3 Killed; 4 Wounded	3 Killed; 8 Wounded

The Battle of Legareville was fought on December 25, 1863, during the American Civil War. Confederate forces tried to surprise Union forces near Legareville on Johns Island, but failed to destroy the federal forces or drive them away from Legareville.

== Confederate Preparation ==
Major Edward Manigault (brother to Brig. Gen. Arthur Middleton Manigault), commanding the South Carolina Siege Train or Manigaults Battalion wrote the only in depth record of confederate artillery preparation in his diary, even though he was never present for their construction. He reported that there were 5 artillery positions, the 1st Upper Battery commanded by Capt. Benjamin C. Webb of Company A, South Carolina Siege Train with two 30-lb. Parrot Guns, the 2nd Upper Battery commanded by 1st Lt. Ralph Nesbit of Company B, South Carolina Siege Train with two 8-inch Siege Howitzers, the Lower Battery commanded by Captain Frederick C. Schultz of Company F, 3rd SC Artillery Battalion with two 3.5-inch Blakely rifles, one 10-pdr Parrott, along with an 8-inch howitzer, the Legareville Road Battery commanded by 1st Lt. John P. Strohecker of the Marion Light Artillery with two 12-lb. napoleons, and the Inglis Light Artillery Battery commanded by Capt. William E. Charles with two 3.5-inch Blakey Rifles and two 12-lb. howitzers. The artillery batteries all fell under the command of Lt. Col. Delaware B. Kemper. But the artillery and infantry elements both had different commanders, which did not allow the surprise that had been planned for Christmas 1863 to follow through like it had been planned. Col. Powhatan R. Page of the 26th Virginia Infantry had two companies of his own regiment and five of the 59th Virginia Infantry and commanded them as the infantry element of this force.

== Union forces in the area ==
A small force of some 200 infantrymen from the division of Brigadier General George Henry Gordon. They occupied the area just outside of Legareville and had support from only one union navy vessel, the USS Marblehead. The Marblehead was under the command of Lieutenant Commander Richard Worsam Meade, the nephew of Major General George Gordon Meade. The Marblehead boasted a XI-inch Dahlgren Gun, two 24-lb smoothbore guns, and one 20-lb rifle. Further down the Stono River, which ran along Johns Island past Legareville and into the Atlantic, two other gunboats were posted near the Stono Inlet. They were the USS Pawnee, commanded by George Balch and with the firepower of eight IX-inch Dahlgren guns, one 100-lb Parrot Rifle, one 50-lb Dahlgren Rifle, and two 12-lb boat howitzers. The other boat was the USS C. P. Williams, a mortar schooner that mounted a couple 8-inch mortars and was under the command of Acting Master S. N. Freeman.

== Opening Battle ==
At around 6 am on Christmas morning the howitzers of the 2nd Upper Battery opened fire and not long afterwards the lower Battery opened fire as well, but their fire was ineffective. When artillery fire started, Union Lieutenant Commander Richard Meade, wearing only his nightclothes, ordered his men to respond with artillery fire. With steam in only one of the Marblehead's boilers, the ship lifted anchor and maneuvered downstream and continued to fire on the confederates. Despite Confederate accuracy and casualties among the gun crew, Boatswain's Mate William Farley, captain of the XI-inch pivot gun, got off the Marblehead 's response. Meade's servant, escaped slave Robert Blake, even helped with the guns after a crew member was shot down. One crew member, Charles Moore, was wounded and bleeding profusely, but refused to leave and continued to help with artillery efforts. Quartermaster James Miller then stepped up to the foredeck and cast the lead and led the ship safely away, saving it from possible destruction of running aground. Acting Ensign George Winslow also helped to rally the crew to the guns.

== Later Stages ==
The remaining guns of the 1st Upper battery, the Legareville Road Battery, and the Inglis Light Artillery Battery opened fire on the union forces in town. Even though the confederates had an advantage, Colonel Page refused to advance the infantry until the Marblehead was disabled. Instead of advancing Page tried to induce the small detachment to surrender but failed because the Marblehead was still in action. By this time the Pawnee and C. P. Williams were moving into action. At 6:35 the C. P. Williams was enfilading confederate positions. With the Pawnee joining in, the union bombardment completely disrupted the confederate artillery. By 7:30 am the confederates stopped firing, and the federals followed soon afterwards. Colonel Page soon order the withdrawal of confederate forces. Lt. Colonel Delaware Kemper had to leave two 8-inch howitzers behind. He had his men wait behind Abbapoola Creek to recover them but fire from the C. P. Williams refused them the chance to regain them.

== Aftermath ==
Union casualties were 3 killed and 4 wounded, compared to confederate 3 killed and 8 wounded. After the battle, Colonel Page blamed poor artillery for the inconclusive battle. Delaware Kemper defended his men with the fact that the range did not allow their fire to accurately disable the Marblehead. With his report, General P. G. T. Beauregard took both accounts in. He reported that "The failure to destroy or drive away the Marblehead is due to the inefficiency of the artillery through bad ammunition, fuzes, and primers, and bad service of the guns. The 8-inch howitzers, objected to by Lieutenant-Colonel Kemper, were intended to kill the enemy." Unknown to the confederates, their artillerists fired with some degree of accuracy. The Marblehead recorded 30 hits. " We have one 30-pounder shell that was lodged in the steerage and did not explode ..." Meade recorded two other unexploded shells lodged in the ship. Overall Meade reported extensive, but largely superficial, damage. Eventually, Farley, Miller, Blake, and Moore (who was not in Meade's recommendations) received the Medal of Honor for their actions on Christmas Day 1863.
