= USS C. P. Williams =

Gunboat of the United States Navy

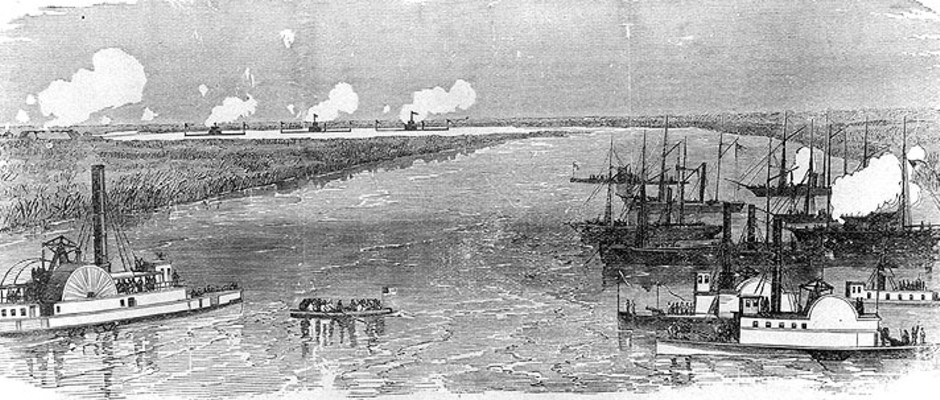
- Firing on Fort McAllister from the right foreground are mortar schooners, including C.P. Williams, Norfolk Packet and Para.

History

United States
- Name: USS C.P. Williams
- Acquired: September 2, 1861 at New York City
- Commissioned: January 21, 1862
- Decommissioned: June 27, 1865
- Fate: Sold August 10, 1865

General characteristics
- Type: Mortar schooner
- Displacement: 210 long tons (210 t)
- Length: 103 ft 8 in (31.60 m)
- Beam: 28 ft 3 in (8.61 m)
- Draft: 8 ft 2 in (2.49 m)
- Propulsion: Sail
- Speed: 10 kn (12 mph; 19 km/h)
- Complement: 35
- Armament: 1 × 13 in (330 mm) mortar, 2 × 32-pounder guns

USS C. P. Williams was a mortar schooner acquired by the Union Navy during the American Civil War. She was used for various purposes, but, especially for bombardment because of her large 13 in (330 mm) mortar that could fire up and over tall riverbanks.

== Service history ==
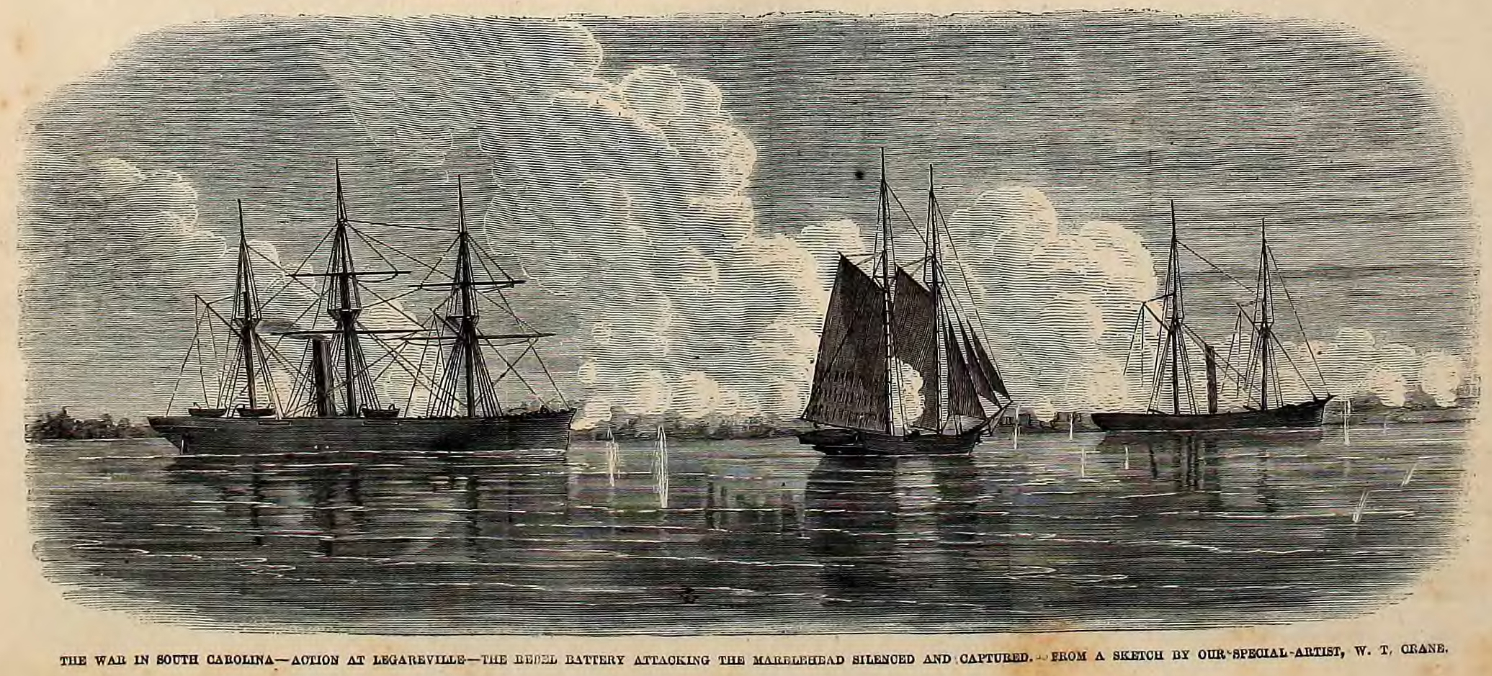
Action at Legareville. The rebel battery attacking the Marblehead silenced and captured, December 25, 1863. Williams, center

C. P. Williams was purchased by the Navy Department at New York City on September 2, 1861; fitted out as a mortar schooner; commissioned on January 21, 1862, Acting Master A. R. Langthorne in command; and reported to the Mortar Flotilla in the Mississippi River. From March 13-July 17, 1862, C. P. Williams cruised the lower Mississippi River, joining in the bombardments of Forts Jackson and St. Philip, Louisiana from April 18–23, and Vicksburg, Mississippi from June 27 – July 3 as well as blockading Berwick Bay.

C. P. Williams sailed north on July 17 for repairs at Baltimore, Maryland in September–October. On November 9, she joined the South Atlantic Blockading Squadron at Port Royal, South Carolina. She was engaged in the Battle of Legareville. During the remainder of the war, she patrolled the rivers and sounds of the area, fired in the bombardments of forts, covered landing parties, and engaged detachments of Confederate cavalry ashore. On June 9, 1865, C. P. Williams cleared Charleston, South Carolina, for Philadelphia, Pennsylvania, arriving on the 19th. She was decommissioned on June 27 and sold on August 10.
