= William Farley (Medal of Honor) =

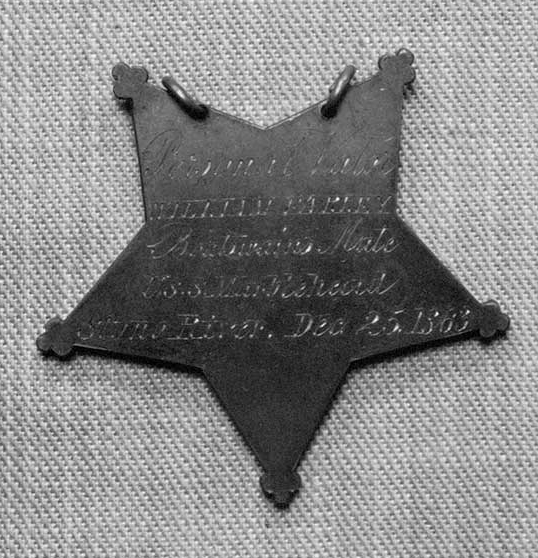
- Reverse of Farley's Medal of Honor
- Born: 1835; Whitefield, Maine, US
- Died: Unknown
- Military career
- Allegiance: United States
- Branch: United States Navy
- Service years: 1860 - 1864
- Rank: Boatswain's mate
- Unit: (United States Navy) USS Marblehead
- Conflicts: American Civil War: Battle of Legareville
- Awards: Medal of Honor

William Farley (born 1835, date of death unknown) was a Union Navy sailor in the American Civil War and a recipient of the U.S. military's highest decoration, the Medal of Honor, for his actions during an 1863 engagement.

== Biography ==
Born in 1835 in Whitefield, Maine, Farley joined the Navy from Boston, Massachusetts in December 1860. He served during the Civil War as a boatswain's mate on the USS Marblehead. While on the Stono River on December 25, 1863, Marblehead came under fire from Confederate forces at the Battle of Legareville on Johns Island. Farley "animated his men and kept up a rapid and effective fire on the enemy throughout the engagement". The Confederates eventually abandoned their position, leaving a caisson and gun behind. For this action, he was awarded the Medal of Honor four months later on April 16, 1864.

== Medal of Honor citation ==
Farley's official Medal of Honor citation reads:

Served on board the U.S.S. Marblehead off Legareville, Stono River, 25 December 1863, during an engagement with the enemy on John's Island. Behaving in a gallant manner, Farley animated his men and kept up a rapid and effective fire on the enemy throughout the engagement which resulted in the enemy's abandonment of his positions, leaving a caisson and 1 gun behind.

== See also ==
- List of American Civil War Medal of Honor recipients: A–F
