= Inglis Light Artillery =

Inglis Light Artillery Company D, 2nd South Carolina Artillery
- Active: March 20, 1862 - April 26, 1865
- Country: Confederate States of America
- Allegiance: Confederate States Army
- Branch: Artillery
- Type: Battery
- Nickname(s): "Charles' Battery"
- Engagements: American Civil War: Battle of Secessionville; Skirmish of Battery White; Second Battle of Charleston Harbor; Battle of Legareville; Skirmish at Haulover Cut; Battle of Burden's Causeway; Battle of Honey Hill; Battle of Averasboro; Battle of Bentonville

Commanders
- Notable commanders: Maj. Frederick F. Warley; Capt. William E. Charles

The Inglis Light Artillery was a Confederate light artillery battery during the American Civil War that served on the South Carolina Coast.

== Formation ==
Named in honor of a father and son, John A. Inglis, a chairmen of the Secession Convention committee, and Captain William C. Inglis, the adjutant of the 8th SC Infantry who died of typhoid in Richmond on October 18, 1861, the Battery mustered into confederate service on March 20, 1862 at Darlington Court House, SC. The Battery was originally promised to fight in Virginia but instead was sent to Charleston during its early service. The company was considered to be from Darlington since most of its men were from the districts of Darlington, Williamsburg, and Charleston, as well as a few men from Chesterfield, Georgetown, Sumter, Marlboro, and Marion Districts. On March 20, 1862, Frederick Fraser Warley was elected Captain. For two years earlier he had commanded the Darlington Guards until half of the company refused to follow the colonel of its current regiment, the 1st SC Infantry (6 Months) commanded by Colonel Maxcy Gregg refused to go to Virginia. Warley helped to create a second company from these men but it is unclear whether this company is related to the Inglis Light Artillery, but Capt Warley and later Capt William Charles appear on both muster rolls. On October 17, 1863 Warley was promoted to Major, with 1st Lieutenant William E. Charles filling his position and being promoted to Captain. It eventually was attached to Lamar's Battalion, South Carolina Artillery, under Colonel Thomas G. Lamar, hero of Secessionville, which would later become the 2nd South Carolina Artillery and with the Inglis Artillery becoming Company D.

== First Assignments ==
After the formation of the 2nd South Carolina Artillery, Company D was stationed on James Island, SC during the summer of 1862 as part of the First Military District, Department of SC, GA, and FL, which was under the command of Brigadier General Nathan George Evans. During the Battle of Secessionville, it was present but the terrain kept it to limited use. Afterwards Company D was transferred to Battery White in Georgetown, SC as part of the 4th Military District, Department of SC, GA, and FL, under the command of Colonel William Stephen Walker. Armed with light artillery, 32-pounders and rifled guns, it was soon engaged with a federal gunboat expedition on November 11 and within a few minutes of the beginning, the engagement ended with the retreat of the federal gunboats. They remained at Battery White until it was sent across Winyah Bay to Waccamaw Neck in May 1863. After, it was transferred to back to James Island in the First Military District, under the command of Brigadier General Roswell S. Ripley. It was during the Second Battle of Charleston Harbor that the Inglis Light Artillery came to Fort Johnson on James Island, SC. Here they helped repulse the federal attack on Charleston, along with the rest of the garrison, with ease.

== See also ==
- List of South Carolina Confederate Civil War units
