= James Miller (Medal of Honor) =

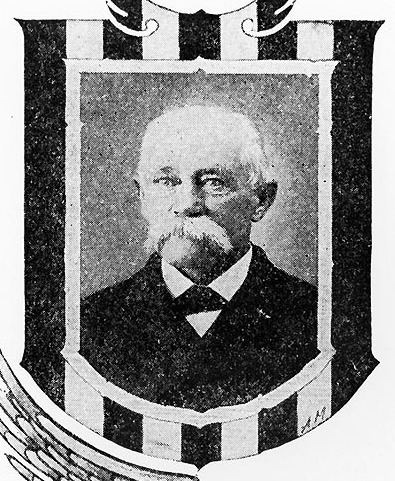
- James Miller
- Born: September 21, 1836; Denmark
- Died: March 4, 1914 (aged 77)
- Burial place: Philadelphia, Pennsylvania
- Military career
- Allegiance: United States of America; Union
- Branch: United States Navy; Union Navy
- Rank: Quartermaster
- Unit: (United States Navy) USS Marblehead
- Conflicts: American Civil War: Battle of Legareville
- Awards: Medal of Honor

James Miller (September 21, 1836 – March 4, 1914) was a United States Navy sailor and a recipient of America's highest military decoration—the Medal of Honor—for his actions in the American Civil War.

== Biography ==
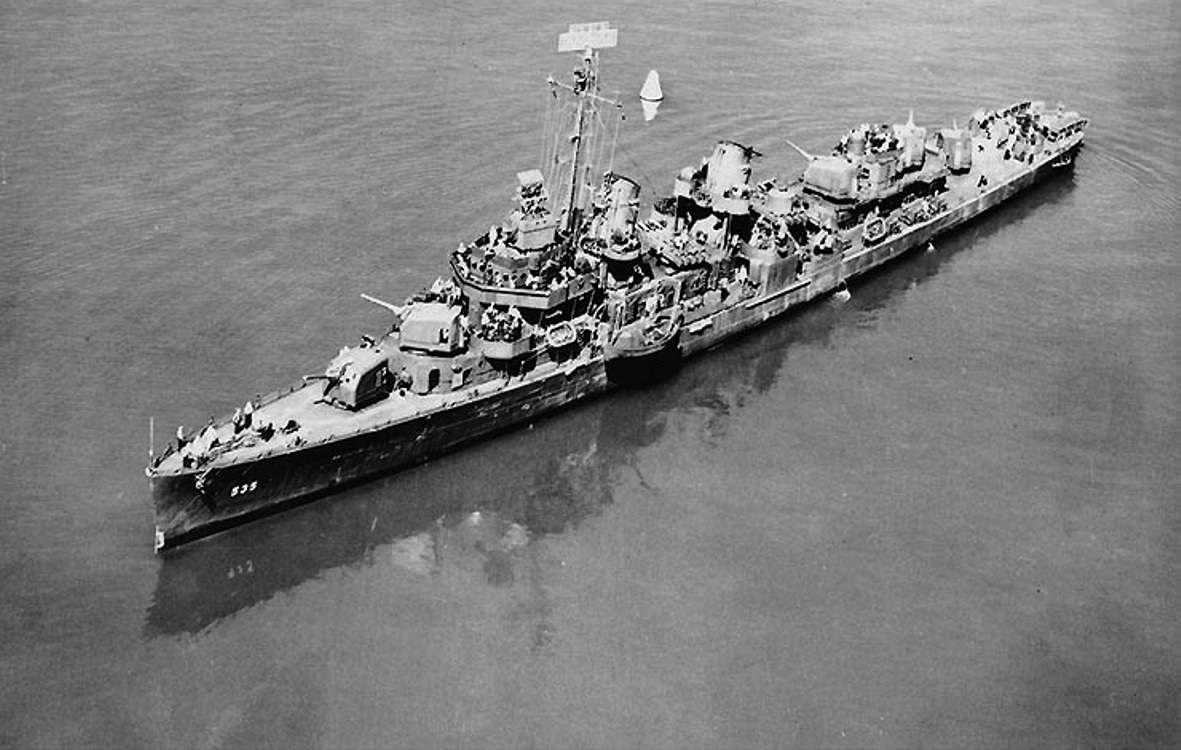
The destroyer USS Miller (DD-535) in San Francisco Bay, September 21, 1943

Of Norwegian descent, Miller was born in Denmark on September 21, 1836, and enlisted in the U.S. Navy from Massachusetts. He served aboard the steam gunboat USS Marblehead. During the Battle of Legareville on John's Island (near Legareville, South Carolina) by the Stono River on December 25, 1863, he continued to take soundings while under fire. For his conduct on this occasion, Quartermaster James Miller received the Medal of Honor and promoted to Acting Master's Mate.

Miller died on March 4, 1914, at age 77 and was buried in Philadelphia. The destroyer USS Miller (DD-535), which served in World War II and the Korean War, was named in his honor.

== Medal of Honor citation ==
Quartermaster Miller's official Medal of Honor citation reads:

Served as quartermaster on board the U.S. Steam Gunboat Marblehead off Legareville, Stono River, December 25, 1863, during an engagement with the enemy on John's Island. Acting courageously under the fierce hostile fire, Miller behaved gallantly throughout the engagement which resulted in the enemy's withdrawal and abandonment of its arms.

== See also ==
- List of American Civil War Medal of Honor recipients: M–P
