= Robert Blake (Medal of Honor) =

United States Navy Medal of Honor recipient

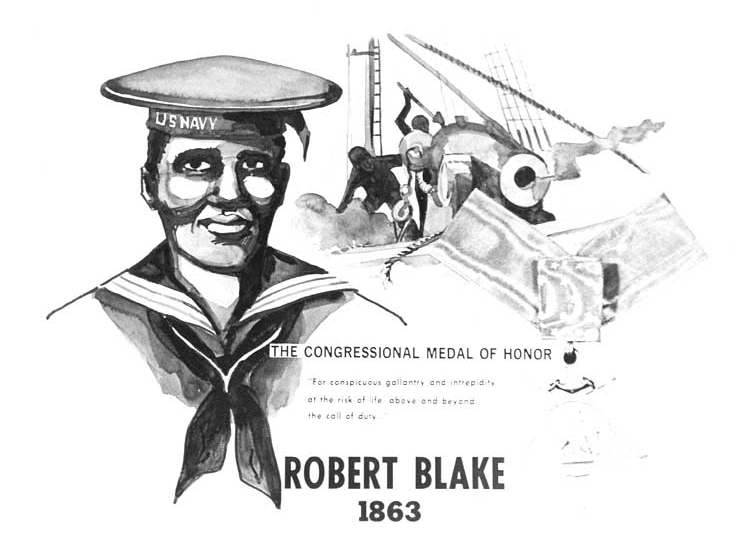
- U.S. Navy poster featuring Contraband Robert Blake
- Born: Unknown; Virginia, U.S.
- Died: Unknown
- Military career
- Allegiance: United States of America: Union
- Branch: United States Navy: Union Navy
- Rank: Seaman
- Units: USS Vermont; USS Marblehead
- Conflicts: American Civil War: Battle of Legareville
- Awards: Medal of Honor

Robert Blake was a Union Navy sailor during the American Civil War and a recipient of America's highest military decoration, the Medal of Honor. Blake was the second African American to perform a Medal of Honor action; William Harvey Carney was the first. Blake was the first African American to actually receive a Medal of Honor - his was presented to him in 1864, while Carney did not receive his until 1900. But, because Carney's Medal of Honor action occurred first, Carney, not Blake, is usually credited with being the first African American Medal of Honor recipient.

== Biography ==
Robert Blake was born into slavery in Virginia. In June 1862, his owner's plantation was burned during a Union naval expedition up the Santee River. About 400 slaves from the plantation, including Robert Blake, were taken as contraband onto Union ships and sent to North Island in Winyah Bay. While on North Island, Robert Blake answered a call for twenty single men to serve on the USS Vermont.

By December 25, 1863, Blake had been transferred to the gunboat USS Marblehead and was serving as a steward to Lieutenant Commander Richard Worsam Meade. Early that morning, in the Stono River, the Marblehead came under fire from a Confederate howitzer at Legareville on Johns Island. As Lieutenant Commander Meade jumped from his bed and ran onto the quarterdeck to give the order to return fire, Blake followed behind him, handed him his uniform, and urged him to change out of his night clothes.

Blake then went to the ship's gun deck and was immediately knocked down by an exploding Confederate shell. The explosion had killed a powder-boy manning one of the guns. Blake had no assigned combat role and could have retreated to relative safety below decks, but he instead chose to take over the powder boy's duties. He stripped to the waist and began running powder boxes to the gun loaders. When Lieutenant Commander Mead asked him what he was doing, he replied "Went down to the rocks to hide my face, but the rocks said there is no hiding place here. So here I am, Sir." The Confederates eventually abandoned their position, leaving a gun behind. For his actions during the firefight, Blake was awarded the Medal of Honor four months later, on April 16, 1864.

Blake was later promoted to seaman and re-enlisted for another term in the Navy. During his second enlistment, he served again on the USS Vermont. Nothing is known of his further life.

== Medal of Honor citation ==
Rank and organization: Contraband, U.S. Navy. Entered service at: Virginia. G.O. No.: 32, April 16, 1864. Accredited to: Virginia.

Citation:

On board the U.S. Steam Gunboat Marblehead off Legareville, Stono River, 25 December 1863, in an engagement with the enemy on John's Island. Serving the rifle gun, Blake, an escaped slave, carried out his duties bravely throughout the engagement which resulted in the enemy's abandonment of positions, leaving a caisson and one gun behind.

== See also ==
- List of American Civil War Medal of Honor recipients: A–F
- List of slaves
