= USS Owen =

U.S. Navy Fletcher-class destroyer

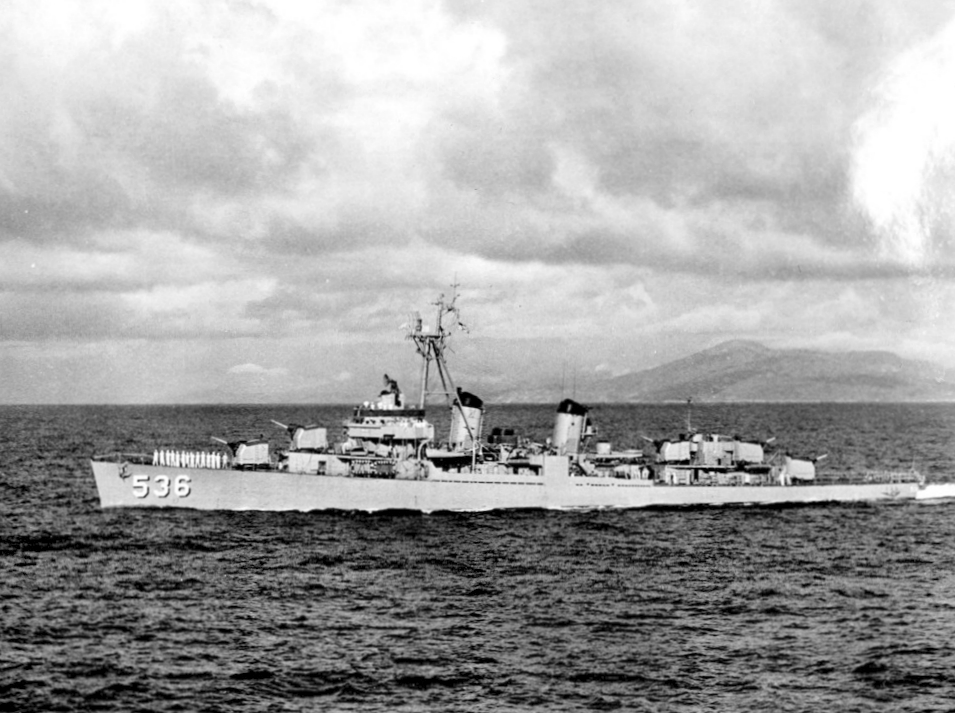
- USS Owen (DD-536) underway in 1957

History

United States
- Namesake: Elias K. Owen
- Builder: Bethlehem Shipbuilding Corporation, San Francisco, California
- Laid down: 17 September 1942
- Launched: 21 March 1943
- Commissioned: 20 September 1943
- Decommissioned: 27 May 1958
- Stricken: 15 April 1973
- Fate: Sold for scrap, 27 November 1973

General characteristics
- Class & type: Fletcher-class destroyer
- Displacement: 2,050 tons
- Length: 376 ft 6 in (114.7 m)
- Beam: 39 ft 8 in (12.1 m)
- Draft: 17 ft 9 in (5.4 m)
- Propulsion: 60,000 shp (45 MW); 2 propellers
- Speed: 35 knots (65 km/h; 40 mph)
- Range: 6500 nmi. (12,000 km) @ 15 kt
- Complement: 329
- Armament: 5 × single Mk 12 5 in (127 mm)/38 guns; 5 × twin 40 mm (1.6 in) Bofors AA guns; 7 × single 20 mm (0.8 in) Oerlikon AA guns; 2 × quintuple 21 in (533 mm) torpedo tubes; 6 × single depth charge throwers; 2 × depth charge racks

USS Owen (DD-536), was a Fletcher-class destroyer of the United States Navy.

== Namesake ==
Elias K. Owen was born on 21 November 1834, in Chicago, Illinois. In 1848, Congressman Abraham Lincoln of Springfield, took Owen to Washington and had him entered in United States Naval Academy, at the age of 14 years as a Midshipman on 7 December 1848. He graduated on 15 July 1854, was promoted to Master on 15 September 1855, Lieutenant on 16 September 1855, Lieutenant Commander on 16 July 1862 and Commander on 25 July 1866. During the Civil War he served in the Mississippi Squadron, commanding USS Louisville and a division of Admiral David Porter's squadron. After the Civil War he commanded the steam sloop Seminole in Panama, 1868–1869. He retired on 9 June 1876 and died on 8 April 1877 at Kaskaskia, Illinois.

== Construction and commissioning ==
Owen (DD–536) was laid down 17 September 1942 by the Bethlehem Steel Corp., San Francisco, California; launched 21 March 1943; sponsored by Mrs. Hope Owen; and commissioned 20 September 1943.

Owen, assigned to Destroyer Squadron 52 (DesRon 52), completed shakedown off California and training in Hawaii in time to join the Fast Carrier Task Force (then called TF 58, as it was then part of the 5th Fleet) for Operation Flintlock. Operating with the carriers throughout most of World War II, she escorted them to their objectives; screened them as they launched dive bombing, strafing, and torpedo attacks; and covered them as they retired.

== 1944 ==
On 16 January 1944 Owen departed Pearl Harbor for the Marshalls. Between 29 January and 3 February she screened the carriers of Task Group 58.2 off Kwajalein, then retired to Majuro. From Majuro her group raided Truk 16 February and then retired briefly to Pearl Harbor, returning to Majuro in mid-March.

On 22 March, the carriers, supported by battleships and cruisers and screened by a ring of destroyers, departed the atoll with Owen in the outer ring of steel. Completing strikes at Palau, Yap, Ulithi, and Woleai, 29 March – 1 April, they returned to Majuro, whence they headed for New Guinea. There they supported Army assault forces with raids on Hollandia, Wakde, Sewar and Sarmi, 21 April – 22 April and then struck at Truk, Satawan and Ponape 29 April – 1 May. Next the force hit Marcus and Wake Islands, 19 May – 23 May and then prepared for the Marianas campaign.

On 6 June, the carrier force again sortied from Majuro. From 11 May through 17 May, its ships and planes ranged from the Volcanoes and Bonins to the southernmost Marianas in support of the assault on Saipan. On the 17th, after screening the carriers during strikes against Saipan, Tinian, Rota and Guam, Owen received word of a Japanese fleet en route from the Philippines. On 18 May, screening continued as she waited. On 19 May, enemy dive bombers opened the Battle of the Philippine Sea. Throughout the two day battle, which permanently crippled the Japanese sea-borne aerial arm, she carried out her protective mission in the screen of Bunker Hill.

Strikes on Pagan Island preceded a brief upkeep at Eniwetok. In July, the force struck Iwo Jima and Chichi Jima, Palau, Ulithi, and Yap. During August there were further operations in the Marianas and against the Bonins. September raids against Palau, Mindanao, Leyte, Luzon and Samar in support of the Palau campaign were followed in October by a foray into the East and South China Seas. On 20 October, the force supported amphibious operations on Leyte and Samar.

Owen, forced by boiler trouble to miss the China Seas operations, rejoined the force for the Leyte landings. On 25 October, Owen, temporarily with TG 34.5, sailed to assist TF 77 units which had engaged enemy forces attempting to enter Leyte Gulf. Shortly after midnight, off the eastern end of San Bernardino Strait, an enemy destroyer, Nowaki, was taken under fire. After several exchanges, Owen and Miller closed to deliver the final blows. They accomplished their mission in under 20 minutes. Nowaki was sunk with the loss of all hands and also those survivors of the Chikuma who were picked up a day before.

Raids against enemy installations in the Philippines continued into November. On 25 November the force retired to Ulithi, whence it sortied, 11 December, to support amphibious operations on Mindoro. Strikes on Formosa preceded another return to the Philippines in support of amphibious landings, this time in Lingayen Gulf.

== 1945 ==
Following the Luzon assault, the carrier force's sorties into the South and East China Seas were stepped up. The ships and planes repeatedly blasted installations from Saigon to the Ryukyus and frequently sailed north to raid Japan's industrial heart. On 19–21 February 1945, the force supported the assault in Iwo Jima, then steamed west again to pound the Tokyo plain. By mid-March, an intensified raiding campaign against the Ryukyus and Japan was well underway, preparing the way for an invasion force.

On 19 March, an enemy dive bomber penetrated the screen to score a direct hit on Franklin Following rescue operations, Owen was detached, with others, to escort the damaged carrier back to Ulithi.

Owen departed Ulithi 5 April for her last operation. For the next 53 days she screened TG 58.2 as it provided air cover for forces fighting the battle of Okinawa and raided Kyu-shu-. On 28 May, she departed the intensely disputed Okinawan combat area. Sailing south, she anchored in Leyte Gulf until 20 June, when she set a homeward course. She arrived at San Francisco, California 9 July and was there when the war ended.

== Post-war service ==
Assigned to the 19th Fleet (Pacific Reserve Fleet), Owen decommissioned 10 December 1946 and was berthed at San Diego. She remained there until reactivated during the Korean War. She recommissioned 17 August 1951, becoming flagship of DesDiv 282, and reported for duty with the Atlantic Fleet in November. Cold weather operations in the North Atlantic in early 1952 were followed by overhaul at Charleston Naval Shipyard and training operations in the Caribbean.

On 7 January 1953, she sailed, with her division, for the Far East. Steaming via the Panama Canal, she arrived at Sasebo, Japan, 12 February; joined the 7th Fleet; and immediately commenced operations off the embattled Korean peninsula. Owen divided her five months tour with the United Nations Force between the fast carriers (TG 77) and the Blockade and Escort Force (TF 95). With the former, her operations were similar to her World War II missions—screening and plane guard. With the latter, she patrolled from Wonsan to Chongjin and acted as flagship for the Yong Do and Wonsan Defense and Blockade Units. Defense of friendly islands, coastal patrol, shore bombardment to silence enemy batteries and impede their transport and communications activities, and mine destruction were included in these assignments.

On 26 June, Owen departed Sasebo to return to NS Norfolk via the Suez Canal. Completing her round-the-world voyage 22 August, she remained on the east coast until January 1954. A 3-month Mediterranean deployment followed, after which she returned to spend the remainder of the year in the western Atlantic.

In January 1955, she was transferred to the Pacific Fleet, arriving at Long Beach on 26 January. On reporting, her division was redesignated DesDiv 192. From 1955 to 1958, the destroyer alternated EastPac training operations and shipyard overhauls with WestPac tours. In December 1957, she returned from her last 7th Fleet deployment and reported for inactivation at Mare Island Naval Shipyard. She decommissioned 27 May 1958 and was again berthed in California as a unit of the Pacific Reserve Fleet, berthed at Stockton.

Owen was stricken 15 April 1973, sold 27 November 1973, and broken up for scrap.

== Honors ==
Owen earned 9 battle stars during World War II; 2 during the Korean War.
