= Tumbok lada =

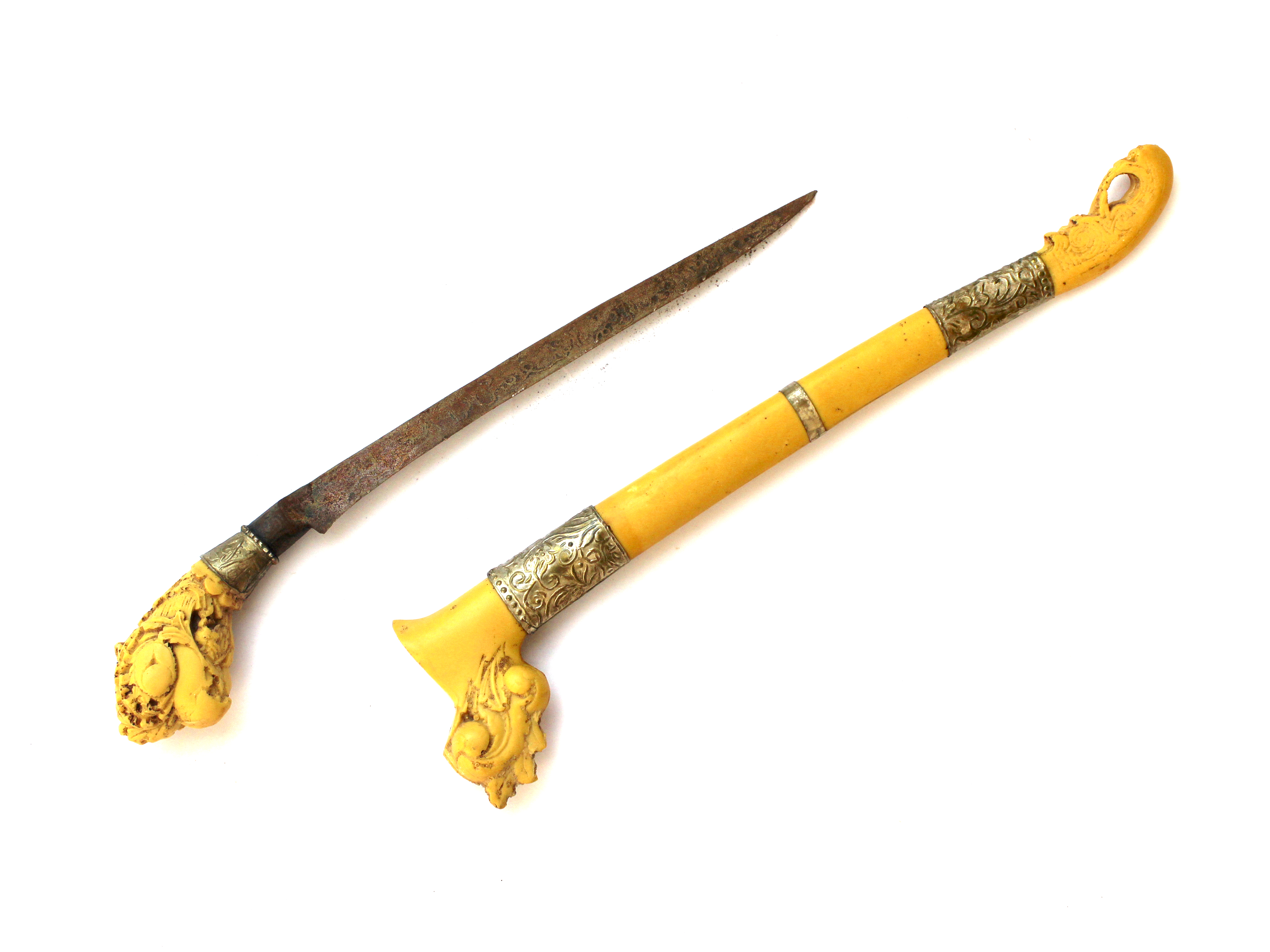
- A tumbok lada gading, a typical weapon of Aru kingdom and east coast Sumatran Malays.
- Type: knife / dagger
- Place of origin: Indonesia (Sumatra), Malaysia (Malay Peninsula)

Service history
- Used by: Batak (Karo people), Malay people, Minangkabau people

Specifications
- Length: overall length: approx. 22–29 cm (8.7–11.4 in)
- Blade type: Sheepsfoot point blade with a single convex edge
- Hilt type: Wood
- Scabbard/sheath: Wood

A tumbok lada or tumbuk lada is a traditional slightly curved dagger that originates in the eastern coast of Sumatra, Indonesia and the western coast of Malay Peninsula, Malaysia.

The name comes from tumbok meaning to grind or crush, and lada meaning pepper. Thus name is derived from the handle of the Tumbok Lada, which is shaped like a traditional mortar and pestle and is used to grind peppercorns. It is thought that the Tumbok Lada may have first being introduced in a bronze prototype.

== Description ==
Tumbok lada has a slightly curved, single-edged blade. The blade narrows slightly from the hilt to the tip. The cutting edge is on the concave side of the blade. The blades are often made from pattern welded steel and usually have one or more hollow grinds that run just below the spine of the blade. The blades are made almost exactly like the sewar blades, but they are wider and thicker. The place is pointed or rounded. The hilt has no guard and is made of ivory. The scabbards are usually made of wood and decorated with carvings, or covered with silver sheet. Some tumbok lada possesses hilt made of solid gold or silver.

== See also ==
- Badik
- Si Euli
- Piso Halasan
