= Pisuwe =

Papuan bone dagger

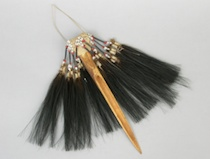
- Type: Dagger
- Place of origin: New Guinea: Indonesia (South Papua)

Service history
- Used by: Asmat people

Specifications
- Length: c. 13.25 in (337 mm)
- Blade type: Spike
- Hilt type: Human femur or Cassowary bone

Pisuwe is a dagger from the island of New Guinea. Ndam pisuwe or Ndam emak pisuwe are those that are made with human femur bone and Pi pisuwe are for those that are made with Cassowary bone. Prior to the colonization of the Dutch in the 1950s, these daggers are carried by the Asmat people and they are used only in ritual killings. These daggers are usually embellished with Cassowary feathers at the pommel and decorated with carved in artworks depicting humans and animals. Asmat men would wear this dagger as part of their traditional attire during customary ceremonies by girding it on the side of their waist.

== See also ==
- Sewar
- Kujang
