= USS Miller (DD-535) =

Fletcher-class destroyer

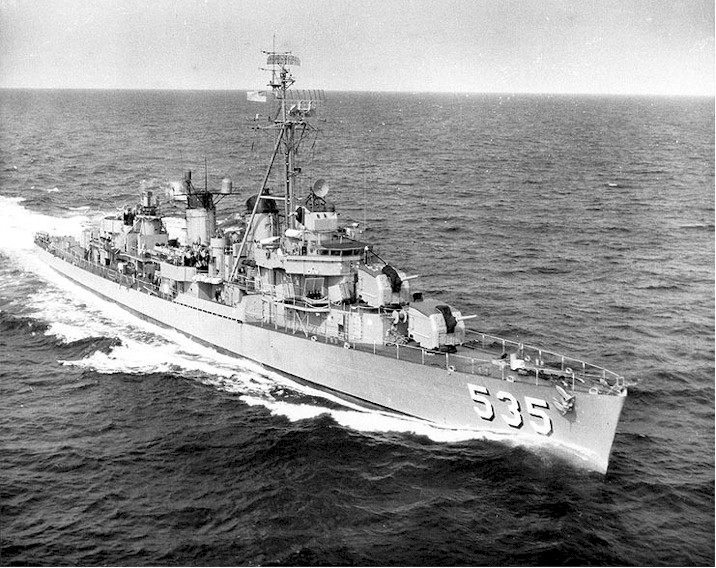
- USS Miller (DD-535) underway at sea, c. the early 1960s.

History

United States
- Namesake: James Miller
- Builder: Bethlehem Shipbuilding Corporation, San Francisco, California
- Laid down: 18 August 1942
- Launched: 15 February 1943
- Commissioned: 31 August 1943 to 19 December 1945; 19 May 1951 to 30 June 1964
- Stricken: 1 December 1974
- Fate: Sold 31 July 1975, scrapped

General characteristics
- Class & type: Fletcher-class destroyer
- Displacement: 2,050 tons
- Length: 376 ft 6 in (114.7 m)
- Beam: 39 ft 8 in (12.1 m)
- Draft: 17 ft 9 in (5.4 m)
- Propulsion: 60,000 shp (45 MW); 2 propellers
- Speed: 35 knots (65 km/h; 40 mph)
- Range: 6500 nmi. (12,000 km) at 15 kt
- Complement: 314
- Armament: 5 × single Mk 12 5 in (127 mm)/38 guns; 5 × twin 40 mm (1.6 in) Bofors AA guns; 7 × single 20 mm (0.8 in) Oerlikon AA guns; 2 × quintuple 21 in (533 mm) torpedo tubes; 6 × single depth charge throwers; 2 × depth charge racks

USS Miller (DD-535) was a World War II-era Fletcher-class destroyer in the service of the United States Navy, named after Medal of Honor recipient Acting Master's Mate James Miller.

Miller was laid down 18 August 1942 by Bethlehem Steel Co., San Francisco, California; launched 15 February 1943; sponsored by Mr. William P. Upshur; and commissioned 31 August 1943.

== 1944 ==
Miller, assigned to the Pacific in Destroyer Squadron 52 (DesRon 52) throughout her World War II service, departed 20 November 1943, for Pearl Harbor. There she conducted exercises until 22 January 1944, interrupted by an escort mission to Makin. On the 23rd she got underway and sailed west with Task Force 51 (TF 51). For the next month she provided screening and gunfire support services as that force assaulted and occupied Kwajalein and Eniwetok. She departed the latter 24 February for Majuro where she joined the Fast Carrier Task Force (then 5th Fleet's TF 58, later 3rd Fleet's TF 38), with which she operated for the remainder of the war.

On 22 March the aircraft carriers, supported by battleships and cruisers, and screened by a ring of destroyers, departed Majuro with Miller in the outer ring of steel. Completing strikes at Palau, Yap, Ulithi, and Woleai (29 March–1 April) they returned briefly to Majuro and then headed for New Guinea where they supported Army assault forces with raids on Hollandia, Wakde, Sewar, and Sarmi (21 April–22 April) and then raided Truk, Satawan, and Ponape (29 April–1 May).

Next the force hit Marcus and Wake Islands (19 May–23 May) and then prepared for the Marianas campaign. On 6 June the carrier force sortied from Majuro again. From the 11th through the 17th its planes and ships ranged from the Volcano and Bonin Islands to the southernmost Marianas, supporting the assault on Saipan and preventing Japanese reinforcements from reaching that beleaguered island and the next target, Guam. On the 17th, after screening the carriers during flight operations for strikes against Saipan, Tinian, Rota, and Guam, Miller received word of a Japanese Fleet approaching from the Philippines. On the 18th she continued to cover the assault forces on Saipan while waiting for the expected engagement. On the 19th she was on the starboard quarter of Bunker Hill as enemy dive bombers opened the Battle of the Philippine Sea. Throughout the 2-day battle, which tore the muscle from the Japanese naval air arm, she remained in that carrier's screen, splashing one enemy plane and damaging another.

After brief upkeep at Eniwetok, Miller got underway to rendezvous with the remainder of the task force for further strikes on Iwo Jima and Chichi Jima (3–4 July) and Palau, Ulithi, and Yap (23–27 July). On 30 August the force sailed to support the landings in the Palaus by conducting raids against Palau, Mindanao, Leyte, Luzon, and Samar (7–24 September). In October, operating from Ulithi, the task force prepared for the return to the Philippines with strikes on enemy installations in shipping in the Ryūkyūs, on Taiwan, and in the South China Sea. On the 20th, it commenced support of amphibious operations on Leyte and Samar. Five days later Miller joined the screen of Task Group 34.5 (TG 34.5), then operating with TG 38.2. The two groups then sailed to assist TF 77 which had engaged an enemy force in Surigao Strait in an opening phase of the epic Battle of Leyte Gulf.

Shortly after midnight, while patrolling the waters at the eastern end of San Bernardino Strait, TG 34.5 sighted an enemy destroyer. After several exchanges of gunfire, Miller and Owen closed in to finish off the target, accomplishing their missions in under 20 minutes.

Miller then rejoined TF 38 which had resumed air operations against the Philippines. The force raided air installations on Luzon, Leyte, and Samar into November, receiving, on the 19th, its first taste of a new Japanese tactic, the kamikaze. Six days later several of the suicide planes broke through the screen of planes and destroyers to score hits on the carriers Hancock, Intrepid, and Essex. With slight damage, except to Intrepid, the force retired to Ulithi. Thence the force sortied, 11 December, to support amphibious operations on Mindoro, and keep Japanese air forces pinned to the ground. Next came strikes on Taiwan, followed by another return to the Philippines to support amphibious operations, this time in Lingayen Gulf.

== 1945 ==
After the Luzon landings, the force stepped up its sorties into the South and East China Seas. It struck repeatedly at enemy installations from Saigon to the Ryukyus and frequently sailed northeast to raid the industrial heart of the Japanese Islands. On 19–21 February 1945 they supported the invasion of Iwo Jima and then steamed west again towards Tokyo. By 1 March they had begun an intensified raiding campaign against the Ryukyus and Japan, again preparing the way for an invasion force.

Miller, participating in these raids on Okinawa, Kyūshū, and Honshū, was near Franklin when an enemy dive bomber penetrated the screen to drop several 500-pound bombs on the carrier, 19 March. The destroyer went alongside to aid in the rescue and firefighting operations and then covered the carrier's withdrawal, for which actions she was awarded the Navy Unit Commendation. Her captain LCDR Dwight L. Johnson was awarded the Navy Cross.

Miller rejoined the fast carriers 8 April as they provided air cover for ground forces embattled on Okinawa. Into June she screened the carriers and rescued downed pilots as the force struck at military and industrial concentrations from the southern Ryukus to Kyūshū. On the 20th, she was detached from TF 38 and ordered back to the United States for navy yard availability. She arrived at Mare Island Naval Shipyard, 9 July, and was still moored there when the war ended.

== 1945–1964 ==
On 19 December 1945 Miller decommissioned and joined the Reserve Fleet at San Diego, California. She remained there until 19 May 1951, when she recommissioned and joined the Atlantic Fleet with Newport, Rhode Island, as her homeport. On 6 September 1952 the destroyer departed the East Coast for Korea and a round-the-world cruise. Arriving at Sasebo, Japan, on 11 October, she got underway for gunfire support and interdiction fire duty with TF 95 off the Korean coast. Remaining on station in the combat area almost continuously until February 1953, Miller also served with TF 77 screening carriers as they conducted air operations against North Korean ground forces. On 11 February she departed for home, via the Mediterranean. After her return to Newport she resumed operations along the East Coast with periodic deployment in the Mediterranean. In 1958, while serving with the 6th Fleet. she participated in that fleet's swift response to the request of President Camille Chamoun of Lebanon for tangible aid to prevent a threatened coup d'état.

In 1959 Miller was detached from service with the active fleet and reported for Naval Reserve training duty at Boston on 9 March. While she was there, a cadet from the training ship MV Rakaia swam across the harbor at night and raised the Soviet flag on her flag mast as a joke. As a training ship, USS Miller conducted cruises for more than 11,000 reservists. In October 1961 President John F. Kennedy activated her reserve crew during the Berlin Wall Crisis. On 30 March 1964 she sailed for Norfolk, Virginia. There, on 30 June, she was decommissioned and reentered the Reserve Fleet.

Miller was stricken from the Naval Vessel Register on 1 December 1974. She was sold 31 July 1975 and broken up for scrap.
