= 26th Virginia Infantry Regiment =

- Flag of Virginia, 1861
- Active: May 1861 – April 1865
- Disbanded: April 9th 1865
- Country: Confederate States of America
- Branch: Confederate States Army
- Type: Infantry
- Nickname(s): Heck’s Regiment; The Bloody 26th
- Equipment: Pattern 1853 Enfield Rifled Musket
- Engagements: American Civil War: Battle of Gloucester Point; Siege of Yorktown; Seven Days' Battles; Battle of Glendale; Defenses of Charleston; Battle of Legareville; Siege of Petersburg; Battle of the Crater; Appomattox Campaign; Battle of Sayler's Creek; Battle of Appomattox Court House

Commanders
- Notable commanders: Colonel Powhatan R. Page

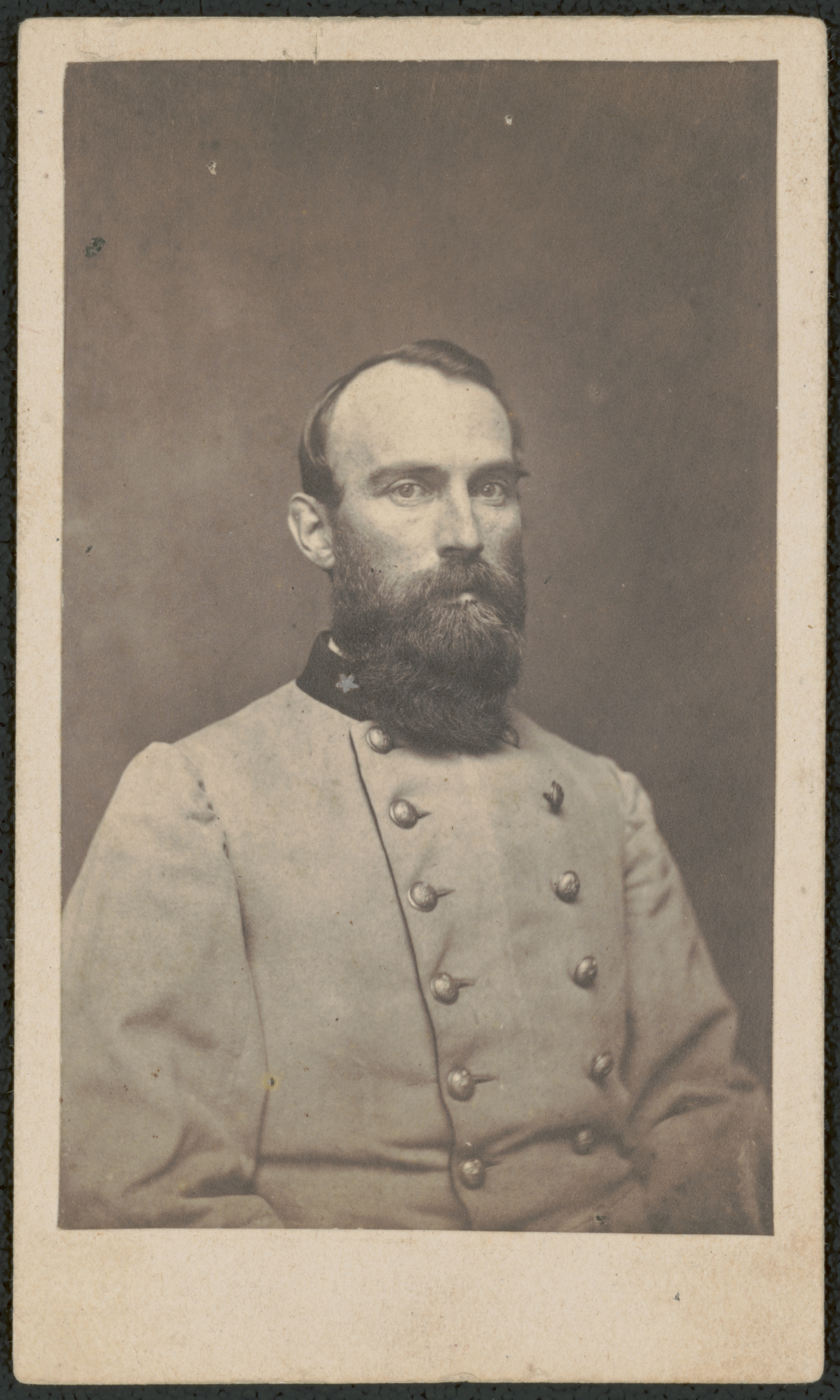
Surgeon Henry Brisco of the 26th Virginia Infantry

The 26th Virginia Infantry Regiment was an infantry regiment raised in Virginia for service in the Confederate States Army during the American Civil War. It fought mostly with the Army of Northern Virginia and in South Carolina.

The 26th Virginia was organized during May and June, 1861, with men recruited in the counties of Gloucester, King and Queen, and Mathews.

The 26th was assigned to General Wise's Brigade in late May 1862, contained 31 officers and 424 men. After being involved in the Seven Days' Battles it was transferred to the Department of South Carolina, Georgia, and Florida. The unit participated in the defense of Charleston, then during the spring of 1864 returned to Virginia. Here it took its place in the Petersburg trenches and was active in various conflicts around Appomattox. Many were captured at Sayler's Creek and on April 9, 1865, there were 15 officers and 81 men present.

The field officers were Colonels Charles A. Crump and Powhatan R. Page; Lieutenant Colonel James C. Coucill; and Majors Patrick H. Fitzhugh, Joshua L. Garrett, William K. Perrin, and William H. Wheelwright.

Colonel Powahtan R. Page, Lieutenant Colonel James C. Coucill and Major Patrick H. Fitzhugh.

Colonel Page was mortally wounded at Taylor's Farm Virginia and died days later.

Companies within the regiment with places of enlistment.

- Company A (The York River Rifles)
- Company B (R. C. Kerr's Company) - many men from Jackson, Mississippi
- Company C (The King and Queen Minute Men)- many men from King and Queen county.
- Company D (Captain Alexander James' Company) - many men from Mathews County.
- Company E (The Lincoln Hunters) From Gloucester County.
- Company F (The Gloucester Invincibles) From Gloucester County.
- Company G (The Clifton Guards) - many men from King and Queen County.
- Company H (The King and Queen Guards) - many men from King and Queen County.
- Company I (The Jackson Grays) - many men from King and Queen County.
- Company K (The Gloucester Grays) From Gloucester County.

The unit's chaplain was the Reverend William E. Wiatt who was with the regiment from July 1861, shortly after it was formed until April 9, 1865 when it surrendered at Appomattox, Virginia.

== See also ==
- List of Virginia Civil War units
