= USS Marblehead (1861) =

Gunboat of the United States Navy

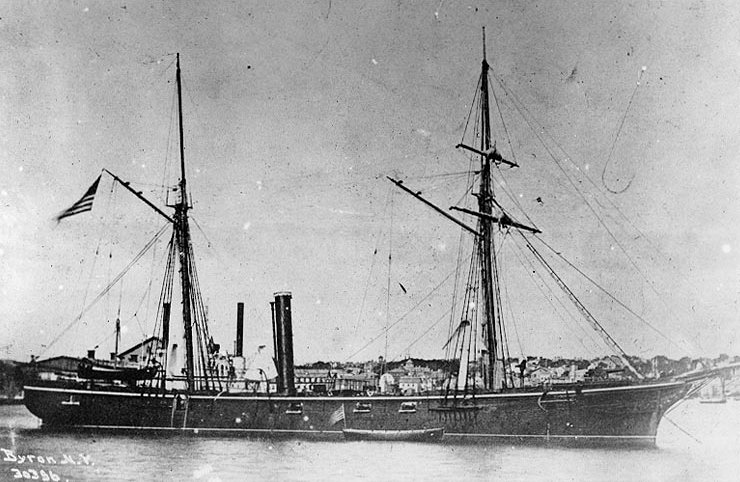
- USS Marblehead

History

United States
- Name: USS Marblehead
- Builder: George W. Jackman Jr., Newburyport, Massachusetts
- Launched: 16 October 1861
- Commissioned: 8 March 1862
- Decommissioned: 4 September 1868
- Fate: Sold, 30 September 1868

General characteristics
- Class & type: Unadilla-class gunboat
- Displacement: 691 tons
- Tons burthen: 507
- Length: 158 ft (48 m) (waterline)
- Beam: 28 ft (8.5 m)
- Draft: 9 ft 6 in (2.90 m) (max.)
- Depth of hold: 12 ft (3.7 m)
- Propulsion: 2 × 200 IHP 30-in bore by 18 in stroke horizontal back-acting engines; single screw
- Sail plan: Two-masted schooner
- Speed: 10 kn (11.5 mph)
- Complement: 114
- Armament: Original: 1 × 11-in Dahlgren smoothbore; 2 × 24-pdr smoothbore; 2 × 20-pdr Parrott rifle

USS Marblehead was a Unadilla-class gunboat built for the United States Navy during the American Civil War.

Marblehead was launched by George W. Jackman Jr., Newburyport, Massachusetts, 16 October 1861; and commissioned on 8 March 1862; Lieutenant Commander Somerville Nicholson in command.

== Service history ==
First assigned to the North Atlantic Blockading Squadron, Marblehead took part in operations along the York and Pamunkey Rivers in Virginia. On 1 May 1862, she participated in the shelling of Confederate positions at Yorktown, supporting General George McClellan's drive up the Peninsula toward Richmond.

In an unusual engagement, the Marblehead was docked in Pamunkey River, Confederate cavalry commander J.E.B. Stuart ordered a detachment of southerners to attack the docked ship, but were discovered by Union sailors and marines, who opened fire - Confederate horse artillery, under Major John Pelham unlimbered his guns and fired on Marblehead - as the ship got under way and the bluecoats called back onto the ship, Pelham's guns raced the ship, firing at it as long as the horse can keep up with it.

The Marblehead escaped, and was reassigned to the South Atlantic Blockading Squadron and commenced patrols off the Confederate east coast in search of Confederate vessels. With monitor Passaic in early February 1863, she reconnoitered the Wilmington River, located in Georgia, in an unsuccessful attempt to locate the ironclad ram CSS Atlanta (ex-Fingal). Later in the month, on the 23rd, she took possession of the prize Glide and her cargo of cotton which had been captured by the United States Coast Survey schooners Caswell and Arago at the entrance of Tybee Creek, in Georgia, while en route to Nassau.

During her patrols of the coastal rivers, Marblehead periodically engaged in operations on the Stono River, South Carolina, in support of the Union defenders of James Island. On 16 July 1863, during an assault by Confederate forces on that position, the gunboat came under fire from Southern batteries at Grimball's Landing. Forced further down river, she continued to provide fire support and prevented Confederate reinforcements from reaching the main body of their attack force. She then joined in the bombardment of forts in Charleston, South Carolina harbor before heading north for repairs.

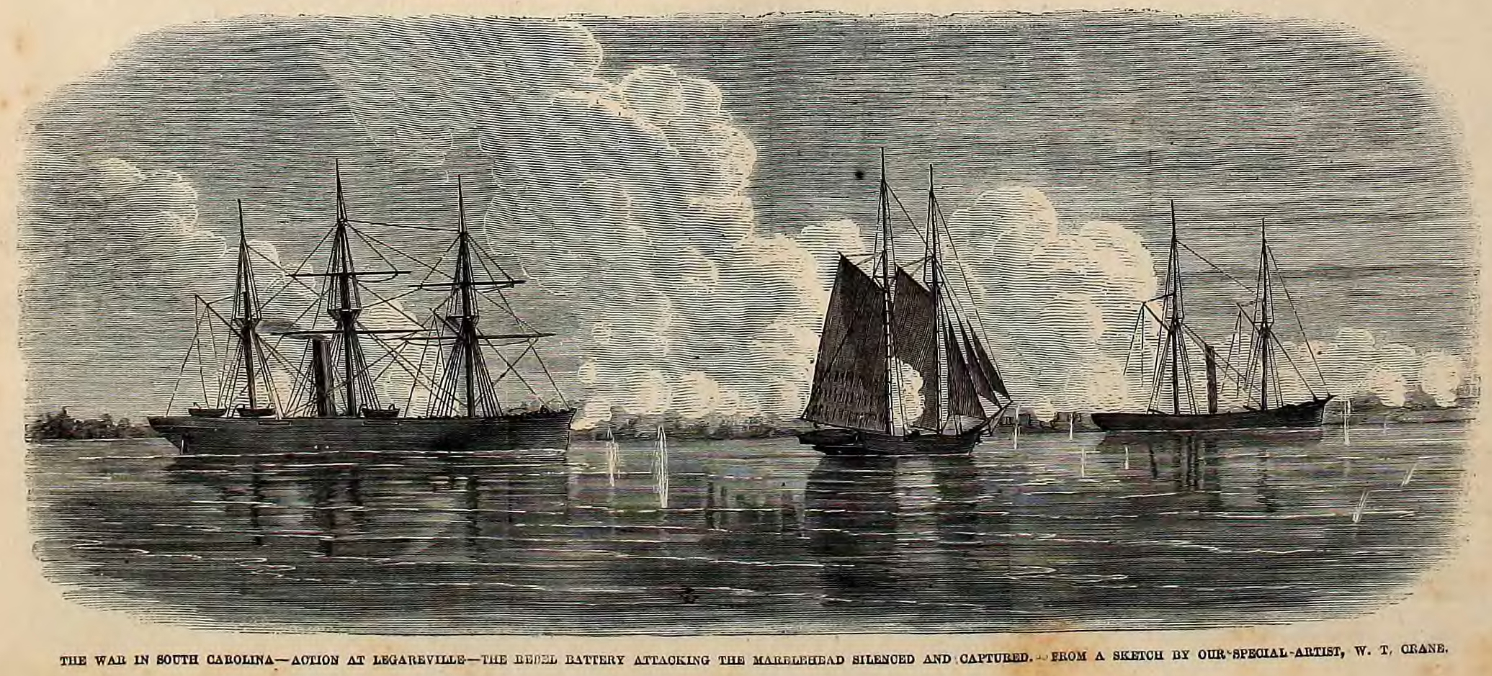
Action at Legareville. The rebel battery attacking the Marblehead silenced and captured, December 25, 1863

Back on the Stono River with Pawnee by November, she provided cover for Army troops as they sank piles as obstructions in the river above Legareville, South Carolina, on the 24th. The following month, on Christmas Day, Confederate batteries fired on the two gunboats in an effort to dislodge the assistance provided by Marblehead and Pawnee. Despite taking 20 hits, Marblehead was still able to take two of the enemy's 8-inch seacoast howitzers before heading back up north for repairs and reassignment. Four of her sailors were awarded the Medal of Honor for their actions during this engagement: Contraband Robert Blake, Boatswain's Mate William Farley, Quartermaster James Miller, and Landsman Charles Moore.

On 2 June 1864, she was ordered to serve as a practice ship for Naval Academy midshipmen at Newport, Rhode Island. A month later this service was interrupted as she resumed coastal patrol duties for five months. She then returned to Newport to serve as a practice ship. After completion of this duty, Marblehead arrived at the Washington Navy Yard where she decommissioned 19 September 1866. Recommissioned the following month and assigned to the North Atlantic Squadron, she operated in the Caribbean for the next two years.

On 18 August 1868, she returned to the New York Navy Yard, decommissioned 4 September, and was sold on 30 September.
