= Sewar =

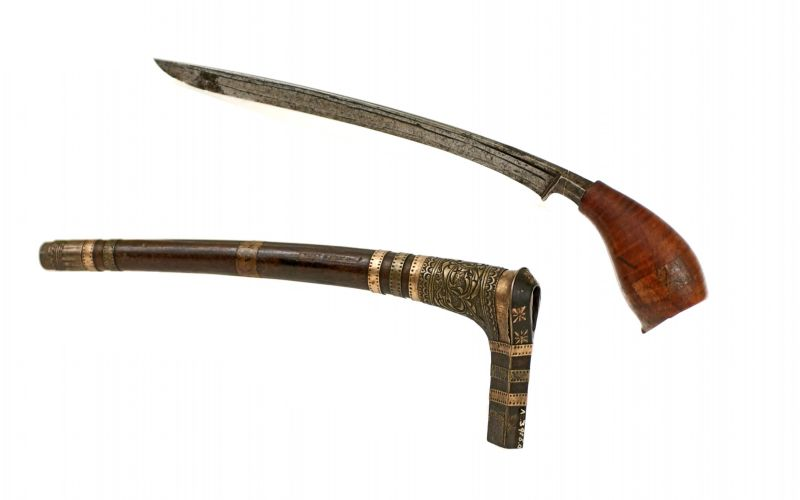
- A Sewar, pre-1887.
- Type: Dagger
- Place of origin: Indonesia (Aceh)

Service history
- Used by: Acehnese, Gayo, Alas, Minangkabau

Specifications
- Length: 12–29 cm (4.7–11.4 in)
- Blade type: Single edge, sometimes double edged
- Hilt type: Wood, horn, ivory, Bahar roots
- Scabbard/sheath: Wood, horn, ivory

Sewar (Sejwa, Sivas, Siwah, Siwai, Siwar, or Siwaz) refers to a dagger of Indonesian origin, typically carried in a belt and used mainly in Sumatra, Indonesia. The blade is also referred to as Sewah by the Gayo people, Seiva by the Minangkabau people, Siva by the Alas people, and Siwaih by the Acehnese people.

== Description ==
The sewar is a short-bladed dagger used in traditional Indonesian close-quarter fighting styles. The weapon has a slightly curved single or double-edged blade. From the handle's base, the blade either narrows or widens at the tip, depending on the style. The double-edged sewar has a back edge that runs from the tip of the blade to the base of the hilt. Typically, the blade is either flat ground, without a mid-line ridge, or hollow ground. Sometimes it has a slightly hollow grind and a reinforced (integral) back, or comes with several slightly hollow sections.

Unlike other traditional combat weapons, the sewar's handle lacks a finger guard. Usually a ferrule made of brass is mounted at the base of the handle to better secure the handle and the blade. For ceremonial versions, a ferrule clamp is extremely ornate (Tampo). Its design can be rectangular, hexagonal, octagonal, or triangular (Glupa). Traditionally the handle is made of wood and often decorated with carvings or metal ornaments. Various versions of the handle are crafted differently, in styles such as the Hulu Boh Glimo or the Akar Bahar.

The sheaths are usually made of wood, with oval-shaped cross-sections, and are decorated with carvings. Expensive versions are often decorated with precious metals or embedded with gems. The sheath consists of two pieces of wood held together with rattan or silver and gold bindings. On one side of the sheath's "throat", where the protrusion of the daggers are visible, more expensive examples are covered with plique-à-jour mountings worked in precious metal and filled with enamel. The Sewar is regarded as outstanding for slashing.

The sewar is similar to the rencong and the Tumbok Lada, but its blade is longer, heavier and rests in a distinctly different sheath. The sewar has functional, ornamental and cultural similarities to the kris, found on the Indonesian island of Java, with variants indigenous to Malaysia, Singapore, Brunei, Thailand and the southern Philippines.

== Culture ==
=== Tari Sewah ===
The Tari Sewah (meaning "Sewah Dance") is a traditional Minangkabau dance performed by two or three dancers wielding the Sewar. If there are two dancers, only one carries the Sewar. With three dancers, two carry the dagger to portray offensive dance movements towards the unarmed dancer. The Sewar is never used by dancers who hold personal grudges against the unarmed dancer. This traditional dance is one of the Tarian Pancak, a category of traditional dance influenced by some styles of traditional Indonesian martial arts, Pencak Silat.

== See also ==
- Pisuwe
- Rencong
