= Carmen Ernestina =

Austal fast ferry

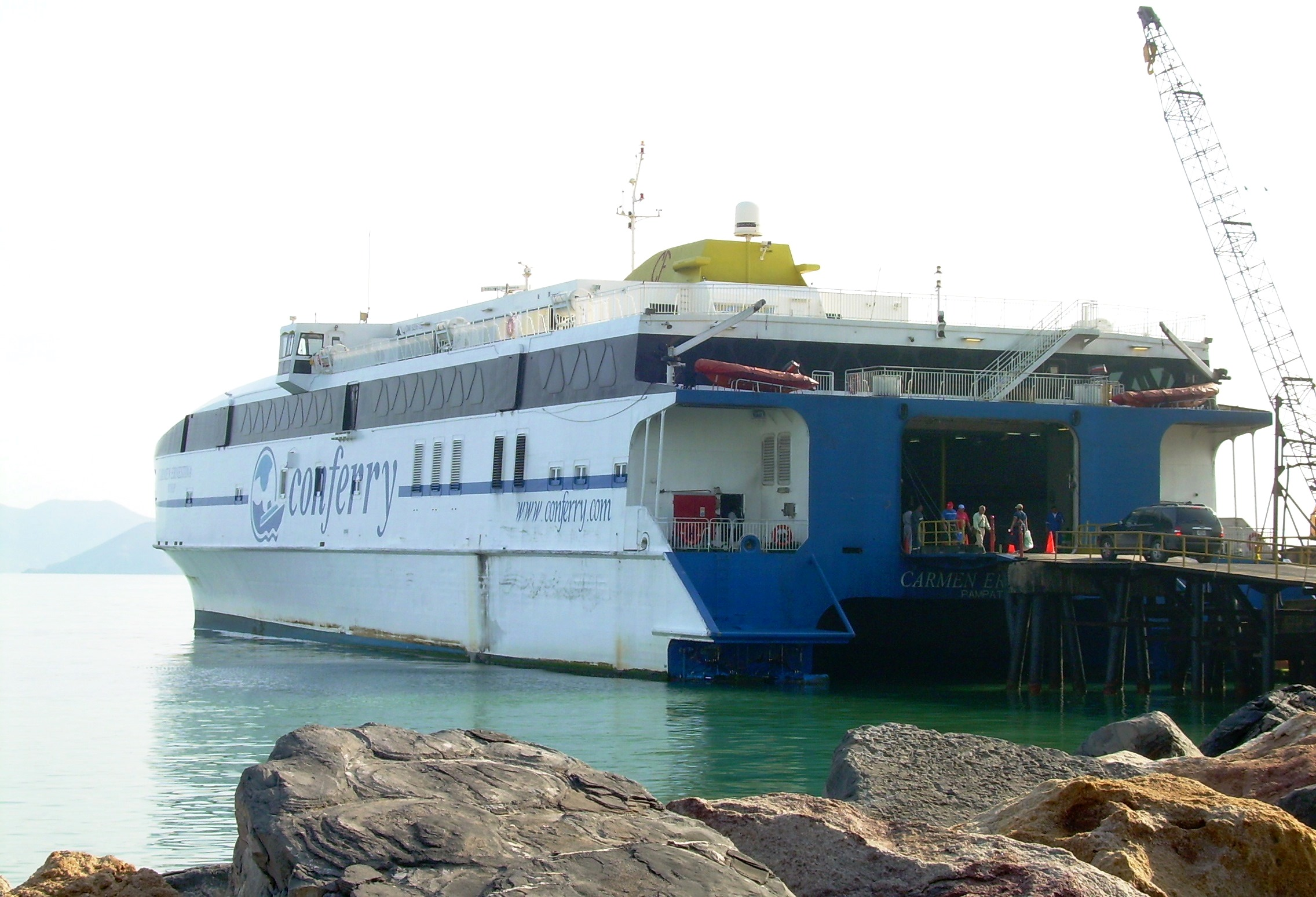
- Carmen Ernestina in Puerto La Cruz

History
- Name: Carmen Ernestina
- Owner: (1999–2011): Conferry; (2011–2016): Consorcio de Ferrys C.A. (La Nueva Conferry)
- Operator: Consorcio de Ferrys C.A. (Conferry)
- Port of registry: Puerto La Cruz, Venezuela
- Route: Puerto La Cruz – Punta de Piedras
- Builder: Austal Ships Pty Ltd; Fremantle, Western Australia
- Yard number: 93
- Launched: 1999
- Completed: 1999
- Acquired: August 1999
- In service: 1999
- Out of service: 2013
- Identification: IMO number: 9206126; Call sign: YV2027; MMSI number: 740342000
- Fate: Partially sank while laid up on 9 October 2016; subsequently scrapped.
- Status: Scrapped

General characteristics
- Class & type: Austal Auto Express 86
- Tonnage: 6,014 GT; 400 DWT
- Length: 86.60 m (284 ft 1 in)
- Beam: 24.00 m (78 ft 9 in)
- Draft: 3.20 m (10 ft 6 in)
- Installed power: 4 × Caterpillar 3618 diesel engines (total 28,800 kW)
- Propulsion: 4 × Kamewa 112 SII waterjets
- Speed: 39.0 knots (72.2 km/h; 44.9 mph) (service) 42.0 knots (77.8 km/h; 48.3 mph) (max)
- Capacity: 800 passengers; 200 cars

Carmen Ernestina was a 86-metre high-speed catamaran passenger and vehicle ferry operated by the Venezuelan state-owned shipping line Conferry. Built in Australia by Austal in 1999, the vessel spent her entire operational career linking Puerto La Cruz on the Venezuelan mainland with Punta de Piedras on Margarita Island. After being taken out of service in 2013 due to mechanical issues, the laid-up ferry suffered a hull breach and partially sank at her dock in 2016, leading to her subsequent scrapping.

== Service ==
The catamaran, fourth of a series of seven sister units, was launched on 5 January 1999 at the Austal specialist shipyard in Balamban and delivered on 22 June to the Venezuelan company Conferry, for which it entered service on 1 August on the connections between Puerto La Cruz and Punta de Piedras, on the island of Margarita, replacing the Pegasus One. In 2013, with the entry into service of the catamarans San Francisco de Asís, Virgen del Valle II and Virgen de Coromoto, the catamaran was then laid up in Puerto La Cruz, where on 9 October 2016 it finally sank on its port side, after being hit by Hurricane Matthew. Following this, the catamaran was declared a total loss, and was scrapped in Araya, after being refloated.

== Sister ships ==
- Adnan Menderes
- Highspeed 3
- Cecilia Payne
- WorldChampion Jet
- Lilia Concepción
- Virgen de Coromoto
