= Lilia Concepcion =

Scrapped catamaran fast ferry

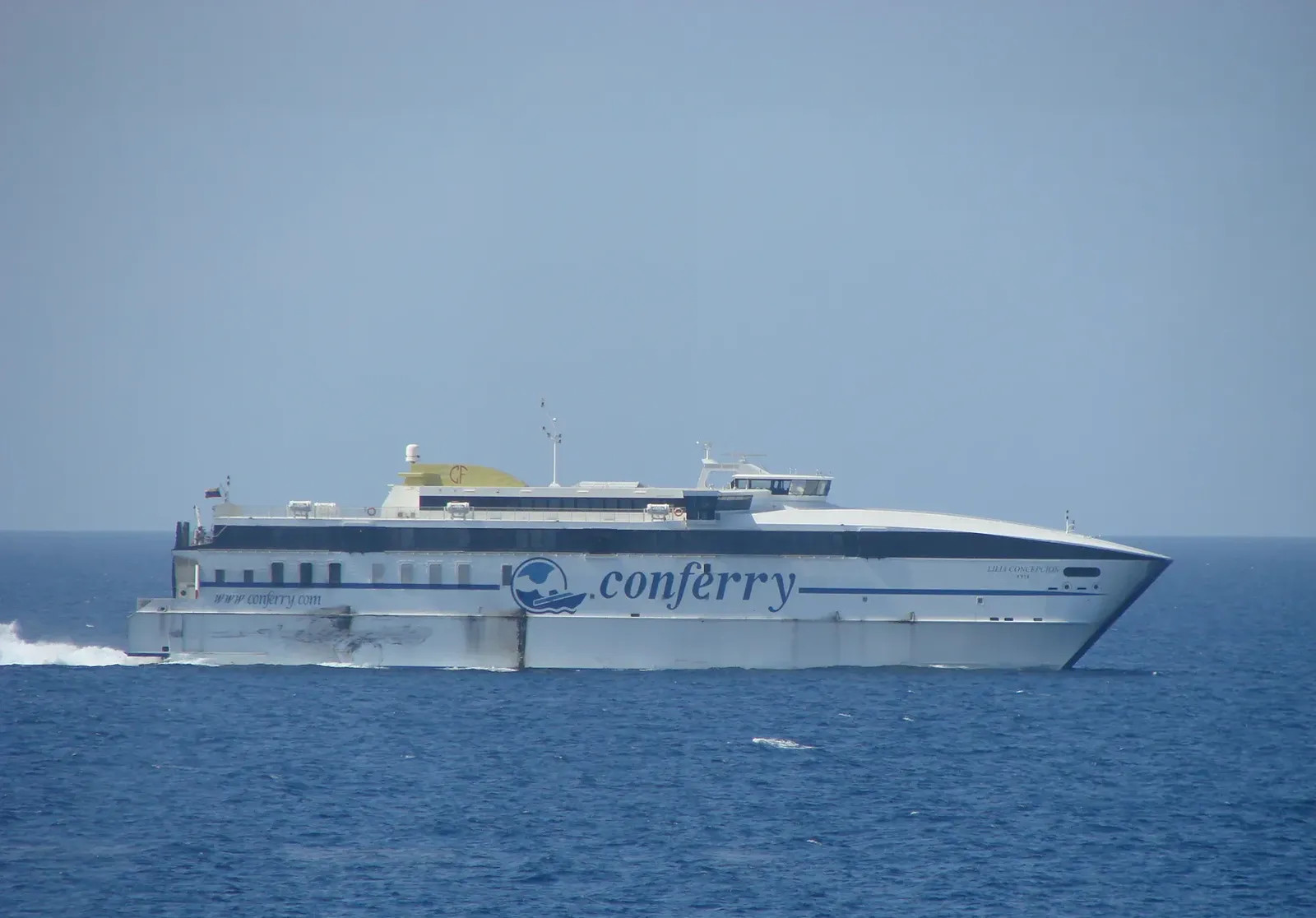
- Lilia Concepcion sailing in Margarita Island

History
- Name: Lilia Concepción (2002–2023)
- Owner: Conferry (Consolidada de Ferrys C.A.)
- Operator: Conferry / La Nueva Conferry
- Port of registry: Pampatar, Venezuela
- Route: Puerto La Cruz – Punta de Piedras; Guanta – Punta de Piedras
- Ordered: 2001
- Builder: Austal Ships; Henderson, Australia
- Yard number: 140
- Laid down: 3 September 2001
- Launched: 12 May 2002
- Completed: 26 June 2002
- Acquired: June 2002
- Maiden voyage: 2002
- In service: 2002
- Out of service: 2017
- Identification: IMO number: 9258973; Call sign: YYIX; MMSI number: 775503000
- Fate: Scrapped in Venezuela (2023)
- Status: Scrapped

General characteristics
- Class & type: Austal Auto Express 86
- Tonnage: 5,992 GT; 400 DWT
- Length: 86.60 m (284 ft 1 in)
- Beam: 24.00 m (78 ft 9 in)
- Draft: 3.20 m (10 ft 6 in)
- Decks: 2
- Ramps: Rear loading ramps
- Installed power: 4 × Caterpillar 3618 diesel engines (total 24,000 kW)
- Propulsion: 4 × Kamewa waterjets
- Speed: 40.0 knots (74.1 km/h; 46.0 mph) (service)
- Capacity: 823 passengers; 243 cars

Lilia Concepción was an 86.6-metre high-speed passenger and vehicle catamaran ferry built in 2002 by Austal Ships in Australia. Operating under the Venezuelan shipping company Conferry (later La Nueva Conferry), she primarily serviced Caribbean sea routes between Puerto La Cruz and Punta de Piedras on Isla de Margarita. After being laid up due to maintenance issues in the late 2010s, she was scrapped in Venezuela in 2023.

== Service ==
The catamaran, sixth of a series of seven sister units, was launched on 12 May 2002 at the Austal specialist shipyard in Fremantle with the name of Lilia Concepción and delivered on 26 June to the Venezuelan Conferry, from which it was transferred to America and put on the routes between Puerto La Cruz and Punta de Piedras, on the island of Margarita, where it was placed alongside its sister ship Carmen Ernestina, which had already been active on the route for three years.

On September 27, 2017,after fifteen years of service between continental Venezuela and Margarita, the catamaran was decommissioned in Puerto La Cruz, where it was finally scrapped in 2023 due to excessive deterioration of the structures.

== Sister ships ==
- Adnan Menderes
- Highspeed 3
- Cecilia Payne
- Carmen Ernestina
- WorldChampion Jet
- Virgen de Coromoto
