= Auto Express 86-class ferry =

High-speed catamaran ferry

Class overview
- Builders: Austal
- Completed: 7
- Active: 7

General characteristics
- Type: Ferry
- Speed: 40–50 knots (74–93 km/h; 46–58 mph)
- Capacity: 800-1,040 passengers; 215 cars or 10 buses and 125 cars

Auto Express 86 is a class of high-speed catamaran vehicle-passenger ferries built by Austal of Australia.

== Ships ==
- Adnan Menderes (1998) - for Istanbul Deniz Otobusleri
- ex Turgut Ozal / exThunder / highspeed3 (1998) - for hellenıc seaways (Greece)
- Jonathan Swift (1999) - for Irish Ferries
- Carmen Ernestina (1999) - for Conferry
- Villum Clausen / WorldChampion Jet (2000) - for Seajets
- Lilia Concepcion (2002) - for Conferry
- Spirit of Ontario I (2004) - for Canadian American Transportation Systems

== Data ==
- Passengers: 800-1040 (400-500 tonnes deadweight (DWT))
- Vehicles: 215 cars or 10 buses and 125 cars
- Speed: 40-50 knots
