= Virgen del Valle II =

Austal HSC catamaran

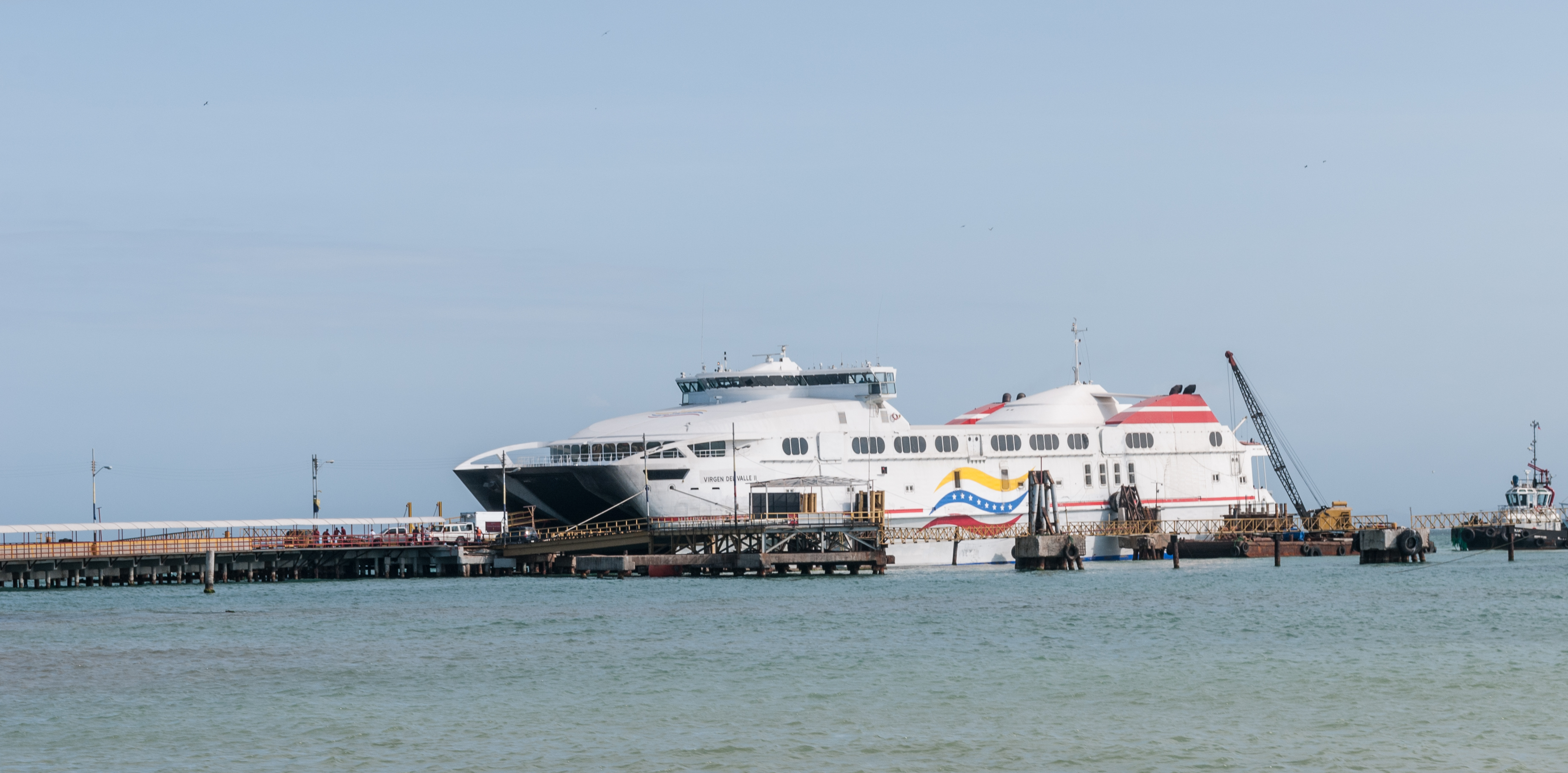
- Virgen del Valle II in Margarita Island

History
- Name: (2001–2013): Euroferrys Pacífica; (2013–present): Virgen del Valle II
- Owner: (2001–2010): Euroferrys; (2010–2013): Acciona Trasmediterránea; (2013–present): Bolivariana de Puertos (Bolipuertos) SA
- Operator: (2001–2010): Euroferrys; (2010–2013): Acciona Trasmediterránea; (2013–present): Consorcio de Ferrys C.A. (La Nueva Conferry)
- Port of registry: (2001–2013): Las Palmas, Spain; (2013–present): Pampatar, Venezuela
- Route: Guanta – Punta de Piedras / El Guamache
- Ordered: 2000
- Builder: Austal Ships Pty Ltd; Fremantle, Western Australia
- Yard number: 114
- Launched: 2001
- Completed: May 2001
- Acquired: August 2013
- In service: 2001
- Identification: IMO number: 9235866; Call sign: YYNE; MMSI number: 775512000
- Status: In service

General characteristics
- Class & type: Austal Auto Express 101
- Tonnage: 8,397 GT; 766 DWT
- Length: 101.40 m (332 ft 8 in)
- Beam: 26.65 m (87 ft 5 in)
- Draft: 4.00 m (13 ft 1 in)
- Decks: 3
- Ramps: Rear loading ramps
- Installed power: 4 × Caterpillar 3618 diesel engines (total 28,800 kW)
- Propulsion: 4 × Kamewa waterjets
- Speed: 37.0 knots (68.5 km/h; 42.6 mph) (service) 40.0 knots (74.1 km/h; 46.0 mph) (max)
- Capacity: 950 passengers; 251 cars
- Notes: Sister ship to Dublin Swift

Virgen del Valle II is a 101-metre high-speed passenger and vehicle catamaran ferry operated by the Venezuelan state-owned shipping line Conferry. Built in Australia by Austal in 2001, the vessel originally entered service in Europe as Euroferrys Pacífica, running busy routes across the Strait of Gibraltar between Algeciras and Ceuta. In 2013, she was acquired by the Venezuelan government following the nationalization of Conferry. Renamed in honor of the patron saint of Margarita Island, she was deployed to link the Venezuelan mainland at Guanta with the islands of Nueva Esparta.

== Service ==
The catamaran, the first of a series of two sister units, was built at the Austal specialist shipyard in Fremantle with the name Euroferrys Pacifica and delivered on 14 April 2001 to the Spanish EuroFerrys, setting sail the same day from Australia to Spain, where it arrived on 26 April. On 24 May it finally entered service on the routes between Algeciras and Ceuta, replacing the Bahia de Ceuta, where it also operated in the following years, although only in the summer period following the absorption of the company by the rival and compatriot Trasmediterránea. On 10 June 2004 the catamaran collided with the Almudania in Algeciras, reporting slight damage to the structures.

In August 2013, after approximately twelve years of service in the Strait of Gibraltar, the catamaran was sold to the Venezuelan Conferry, from which it was renamed Virgen del Valle II and transferred on 16 August to Guanta, where on 24 August it began service on the connections between Puerto La Cruz and Punta de Piedras, on Margarita Island. On 4 October the continental port was then transferred to La Guaira.

On 7 March 2024, while undergoing maneuvers in the port of La Guaira, the catamaran collided with a tugboat, resulting in a hole in the hull on the starboard side. Following this, the catamaran was then repaired between Guanta and Punta de Piedras by INEA, returning to service upon completion of the work, which ended on 18 May.
