= HSC Adnan Menderes =

High-speed catamaran owned by IDO

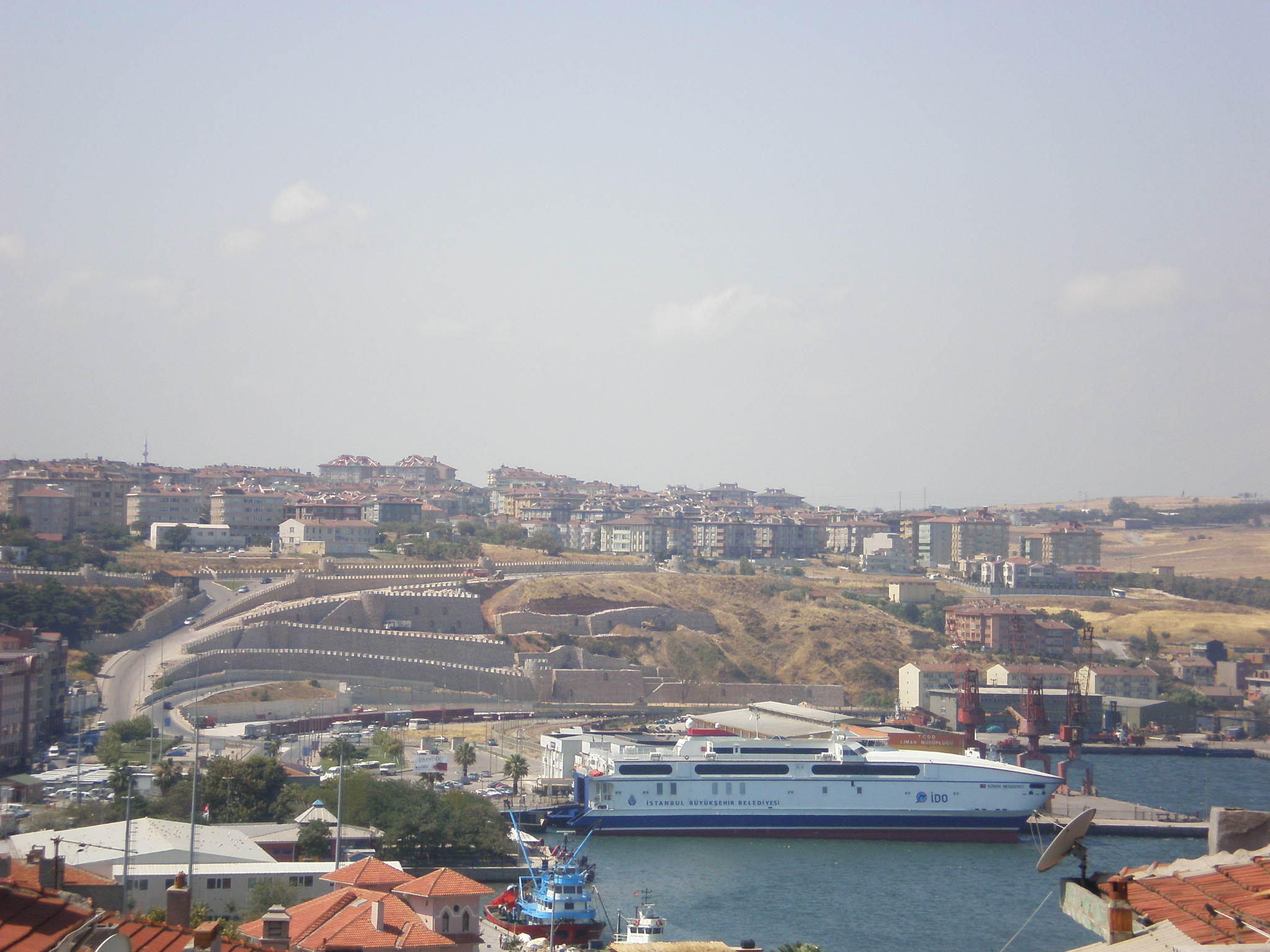
- Adnan Menderes in Bandırma

History
- Name: Adnan Menderes (1998–present)
- Owner: İstanbul Deniz Otobüsleri (İDO)
- Operator: İstanbul Deniz Otobüsleri (İDO)
- Port of registry: İstanbul, Turkey
- Route: Yenikapı – Yalova; Yenikapı – Bursa; Yenikapı – Bandırma
- Ordered: 1997
- Builder: Austal Ships; Henderson, Australia
- Yard number: 63
- Laid down: 21 July 1997
- Launched: 11 April 1998
- Completed: June 1998
- Acquired: June 1998
- Maiden voyage: 1998
- In service: 1998
- Identification: IMO number: 9179933; Call sign: TCJO; MMSI number: 271000538
- Status: Laid up

General characteristics
- Class & type: Austal Auto Express 86
- Tonnage: 4,859 GT; 455 DWT
- Length: 86.60 m (284 ft 1 in)
- Beam: 24.00 m (78 ft 9 in)
- Draft: 3.20 m (10 ft 6 in)
- Depth: 7.30 m (23 ft 11 in)
- Decks: 2
- Ramps: Rear loading ramp
- Installed power: 4 × MTU 20V 1163 TB73L diesel engines (total 26,000 kW)
- Propulsion: 4 × Kamewa waterjets
- Speed: 37.0 knots (68.5 km/h; 42.6 mph) (service) 42.0 knots (77.8 km/h; 48.3 mph) (max)
- Capacity: 800 passengers; 200 cars

Adnan Menderes is an 86-metre (282 ft) high-speed passenger and vehicle catamaran ferry operated by the Turkish ferry operator İstanbul Deniz Otobüsleri (İDO). Built in Australia by Austal Ships in 1998 as part of their Auto Express 86 series, she was named after former Turkish Prime Minister Adnan Menderes. The vessel has spent her entire operational career crossing the Sea of Marmara, connecting Istanbul with ports such as Yenikapı, Yalova, and Bursa.

== Service ==
The catamaran, the first of a series of seven sister units, was launched on 11 April 1998 at the Austal specialist shipyard in Balamban with the name Adnan Menderes and delivered on 6 June to the Turkish İDO, for which it began service on the routes between Yenikapı and Bandırma, in the Sea of Marmara, where it was joined by its sister ship Turgut Özal a few months later. Over the years, the catamaran has continued to regularly serve the route, which it still operates today.

== Sister ships ==
- Highspeed 3
- Cecilia Payne
- Carmen Ernestina
- WorldChampion Jet
- Lilia Concepción
- Virgen de Coromoto
