= Punta de Piedras =

Punta de Piedras may refer to:

- Punta de Piedras, Magdalena, Colombia
- Punta de Piedras, Nueva Esparta, Venezuela
