= Bay Ferries Great Lakes =

- Company type: Private Company
- Industry: Transportation
- Founded: Charlottetown, Prince Edward Island (2005)
- Headquarters: Charlottetown, Prince Edward Island, Canada
- Area served: Lake Ontario (Rochester, New York and Toronto, Ontario)
- Key people: Mark MacDonald, President & CEO
- Products: Ferry service
- Revenue: N/A CAN
- Number of employees: N/A (2005)
- Website: N/A

Bay Ferries Great Lakes was a marketing name used by Bay Ferries Management Limited, a subsidiary of Northumberland Ferries Limited (NFL).

== History ==
In February 2005 Rochester Ferry Company LLC, a subsidiary of the City of Rochester, New York purchased the high speed catamaran ferry Spirit of Ontario I in a bankruptcy auction after previous owner Canadian American Transportation Systems (CATS) shut down the inaugural service in summer 2004 after it operated for 11 weeks.

In April 2005, Rochester Ferry Company LLC selected NFL as the operator of the ferry service using Spirit of Ontario I between Rochester and Toronto, Ontario. NFL had established Great Lakes Ferries Limited on March 31 but the name was subsequently changed only days later to Bay Ferries Management Limited on April 13. The company was registered in the State of New York (Monroe County) on June 29 of that year.

The company began using the name Bay Ferries Great Lakes, borrowing from the name of NFL's other high speed ferry subsidiary Bay Ferries Limited, to refer to its contracted operation on Lake Ontario on behalf of the Rochester Ferry Company LLC.

Bay Ferries Great Lakes announced that the service using Spirit of Ontario I would no longer use the CATS marketing name "The Breeze"; instead the service would be known as "The Cat", similar to the high speed ferry service operated by its sister company Bay Ferries Ltd. between Yarmouth, Nova Scotia and Bar Harbor, Maine since 1998.

Ferry operation resumed June 30, 2005. The fall 2005 season saw very light traffic using the ferry service and coupled with rising costs from record fuel prices, BFGL announced on December 8 that the vessel would stop service for the season effective December 12. BFGL committed to trying to find a winter charter for the vessel in the Caribbean to help off-set the high summer operating costs following the 2006 operating season.

On January 10, 2006, newly elected mayor of Rochester Robert Duffy announced that the city government would not be approving the ferry board's request for additional funding for the city's subsidiary Rochester Ferry Company LLC so that the service could resume in the summer. This effectively killed any hope that Spirit of Ontario I would return to its Lake Ontario operation. The city of Rochester owed BFGL $2.5 million in a revenue guarantee.

BFGL was contracted by the City of Rochester to manage the vessel in mothball status at the Rochester ferry terminal until a buyer could be found. In December 2006 the vessel was moved from Lake Ontario to Halifax and later Shelburne, Nova Scotia, to ensure the vessel's movement to a buyer wasn't restricted by the seasonal closure of the St. Lawrence Seaway.

On April 2, 2007 the City of Rochester announced that it had sold the ferry to a German company for $30 million (USD). Presumably BFGL will be dissolved following completion of the sale.

As of 2007 Bay Ferries Management Limited is still an active company on the corporate registries for Canada (federal incorporation) and the state of New York (state incorporation), however the use of Bay Ferries Great Lakes appears to have been discontinued pending the sale of the Spirit of Ontario I.

== Fleet ==
BFGL operated this vessel under contract for the Rochester Ferry Company LLC:

- HSC Spirit of Ontario I

== Facilities ==
BFGL operated these facilities under contract for the Rochester Ferry Company LLC:

- Toronto Marine Terminal, a two-storey steel and glass structure was built by the Toronto Port Authority for the ferry service at the foot of Cherry Street. The terminal consisted of a lounge, custom facilities and some retail space. Now called International Marine Passenger Terminal and used as docking area is now used by cruise ships. It has also been used as a filming location.
- Rochester Ferry Terminal, a two-storey brick and glass structure with a clock tower in the front entrance built by the City of Rochester for the ferry service. A boarding area (called the "Greenhouse") was attached to the main terminal building which contained custom facilities, lounge and retail space.
