= Phivos (ship) =

Ship owned by Saronic Ferries

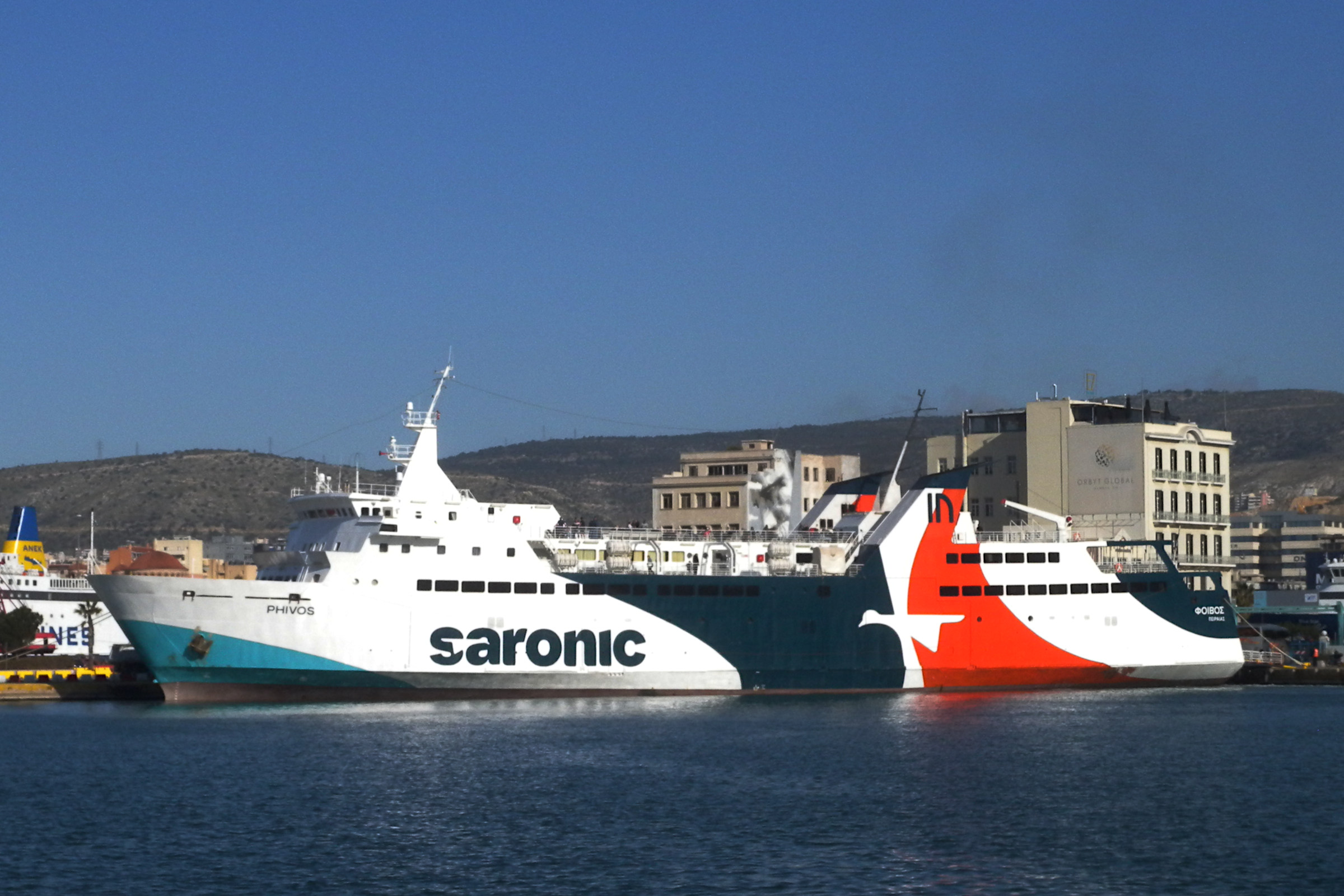
- Phivos in Piraeus

History
- Name: (1980–2004): Punta Europa; (2004–present): Phivos
- Owner: (1980–1998): ISNASA (Islemares S.A.); (1998–2000): EuroFerrys; (2000–2001): Umafisa; (2001–2004): ISNASA / EuroFerrys; (2004–present): Nova Ferries (Nova Ferries I Shipping Co.)
- Operator: (1980–1998): ISNASA; (1998–2000): EuroFerrys; (2000–2001): Umafisa; (2001–2004): EuroFerrys; (2004–present): Nova Ferries / Saronic Ferries
- Port of registry: (1980–2004): Santa Cruz de Tenerife / Algeciras, Spain; (2004–present): Piraeus, Greece
- Route: Piraeus – Aegina; Piraeus – Methana – Poros; Former: Algeciras – Ceuta / Tangier
- Builder: Hijos de J. Barreras (AESA group); Vigo, Spain
- Yard number: 1455
- Laid down: 30 May 1979
- Launched: 1980
- Completed: 30 June 1980
- Acquired: June 2004
- Maiden voyage: 1980
- In service: 1980
- Identification: IMO number: 7825978; Call sign: SXUU; MMSI number: 237808200
- Status: In service

General characteristics
- Class & type: Conventional Ro-Ro Passenger Ferry
- Tonnage: 3,437 GT; 1,147 DWT
- Length: 99.52 m (326 ft 6 in)
- Beam: 17.01 m (55 ft 10 in)
- Draft: 4.25 m (13 ft 11 in)
- Depth: 10.49 m (34 ft 5 in)
- Decks: 3 passenger decks
- Ramps: Stern vehicle loading ramps
- Installed power: 2 × Deutz RBV12M350 diesel engines (total 6,432 kW / 8,625 hp)
- Propulsion: 2 × controllable pitch propellers
- Speed: 16.5 knots (30.6 km/h; 19.0 mph) (service) / 18.0 knots (33.3 km/h; 20.7 mph) (max)
- Capacity: 1,200 passengers; 120 cars

Phivos is a 99.52-metre conventional passenger and vehicle ferry operated by Nova Ferries under the Saronic Ferries consortium. Built in 1980 by Hijos de J. Barreras in Vigo, Spain, she originally entered service for Spanish operator ISNASA as Punta Europa. After nearly two decades serving across the Strait of Gibraltar and the Balearic Sea—including charters with EuroFerrys and Umafisa—the vessel was acquired by Nova Ferries in 2004, undergoing a major conversion in Greece and being renamed Phivos. She currently operates high-frequency island connections in the Saronic Gulf, linking Piraeus with Aegina, Methana, and Poros.

== Service ==
The ferry, the second of a series of four sister units, was launched on 6 November 1979 at the Hijos de J. Barreras shipyard in Vigo with the name Punta Europa and delivered on 30 June 1980 to the Majorcan ISNASA, which used it on the routes between Algeciras and Tangier, in the Strait of Gibraltar, where it operated alongside its first sister, the Bahia de Malaga. In 1998, with the birth of Baleària, the ferry and the sister ships were transferred to the latter, but in May they were chartered together with the Bahia de Ceuta to EuroFerrys, from which they were transferred to the routes between the Andalusian port and Ceuta. In July 1999, at the end of the charter, the ferry returned to Baleària, where it was laid up in Algeciras, where it remained until 2000, when it was purchased by Umafisa and put on the routes between Dénia and Sant Antoni de Portmany, in the Balearics, but was again laid up the following year.

In May 2003, after about two years of layup, the ferry was purchased together with its twin Bahia de Ceuta, which had also been laid up for about two years in Andalusia, by the Italian company TR.IS, from which they were towed in July to the shipyards of Genoa, where they were supposed to undergo some renovation works, in view of entering into service on the connections between Piombino and Portoferraio. However, despite the initial project, the company was unable to obtain the necessary authorisations to operate the connection and, following its bankruptcy, which occurred shortly afterwards, EneRmaR, which took over the activities of TR.IS, decided to abandon the intentions of the previous management and put the two ferries up for sale, which were then purchased on 7 July 2004 by Lefakis, owner of Nova Ferries. Following this, the two twins were then transferred to the Drapetsona shipyards, where they underwent further renovations, during which they were renamed Phivos and Athina respectively. On 8 July 2005, upon completion of the renovations, the ferry finally began service on the routes between Piraeus, Aegina, Methana, Poros and Hydra, where it was joined shortly after by its sister ship.

In 2007, following the sale of Athina, the ferry's service was limited to the route between Piraeus and Aegina only, before being extended to the other islands the following year. In 2014, with the establishment of the joint venture Saronic Ferries, in which Nova Ferries also took part, the ferry was transferred to the latter, for which it continued to operate the connections between Piraeus, Aegina, Methana and Poros.

== Sister ships ==
- Ilha Azul
- Princess Victoria
- Don Candido
