= Conferry =

Venezuelan shipping company

Consolidada de Ferrys C.A.
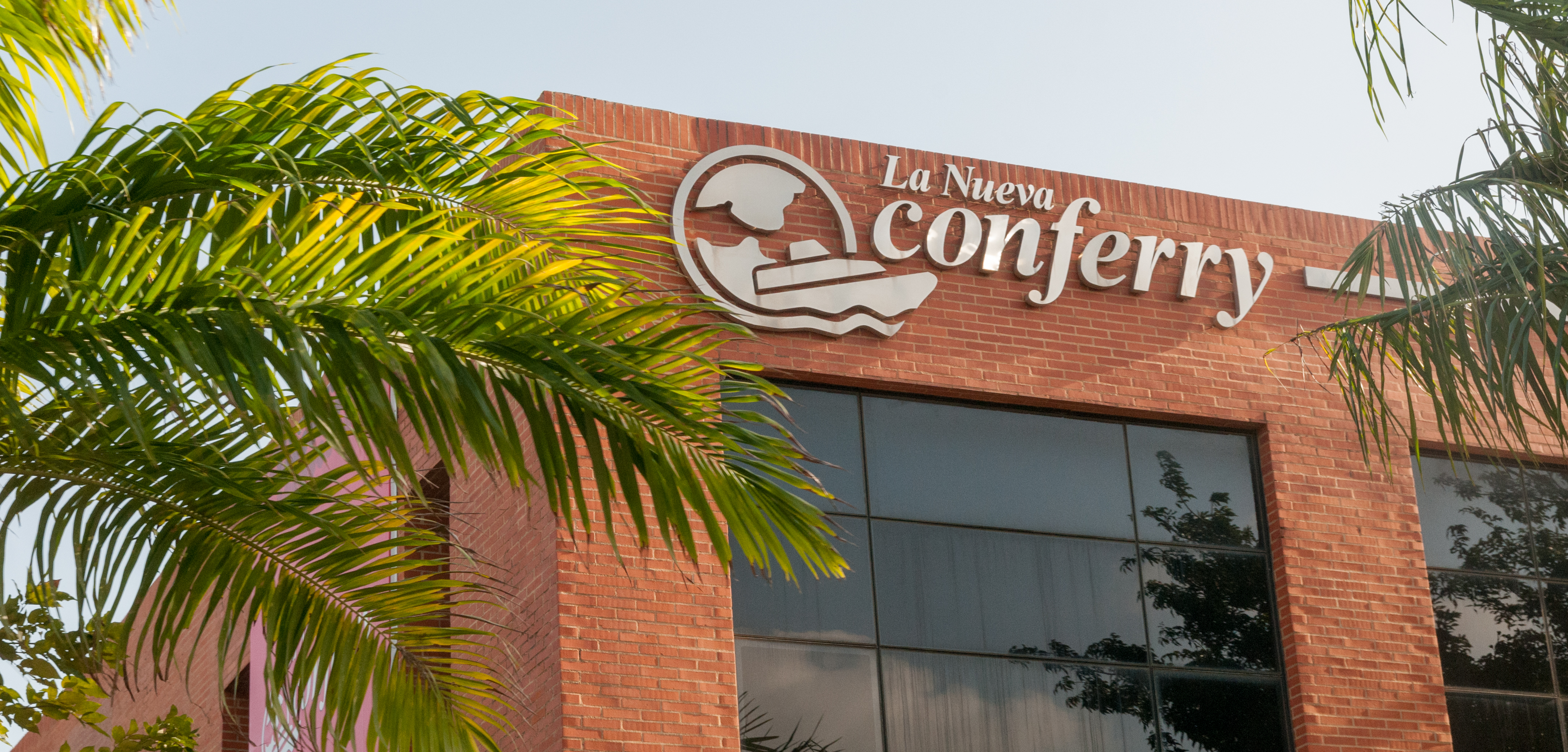
- Conferry office in Margarita
- Founded: 1970
- Headquarters: Caracas, Venezuela
- Area served: Caribbean Sea
- Services: Passenger transportation Freight transportation
- Website: lanuevaconferry.mppt.gob.ve

Conferry (Consolidada de Ferrys C.A.) is a Venezuelan shipping company operating passenger and freight services to the islands of Margarita and Coche, and serves the ports of Puerto la Cruz, Punta de Piedras, Guanta, La Guaira, Coche Island, and the international port of Guamache. The main office of Conferry is in Plaza Venezuela in central Caracas. In 2011, Conferry was expropriated by Hugo Chavez and rebranded as Nuevo Conferry.

== Routes ==
Conferry operate routes across the Caribbean Sea.

- Punta de Piedras - Puerto la Cruz
- Punta de Piedras - Guanta
- Punta de Piedras - Coche Island
- Punta de Piedras - La Guaira

== Fleet ==
Conferry operated a fleet of nine ships, consisting of six high speed ferries and four ROPAX ferries/freight ships. All but 1 of these ships have either sunk, been scrapped, or are otherwise unknown. The current fleet is unknown.

| Name | Built | Entered service | Tonnage | Note | References |
|---|---|---|---|---|---|
| Virgen de Coromoto | 2004 | 2014 | 6,242 GRT | Currently laid up in Puerto Cabello. Reported as of May 2025. | |
| San Francisco de Asís | 2001 | 2014 | 5,889 GRT | Ex Baleària, Last reported laid up in Guanta, moved to an unknown position in 2018. Status unknown. | |
| Virgen del Valle II | 2001 | 2013 | 8,397 GRT | Currently in service, performing 3 returns weekly between Guanta and Punta de Piedras | |
| Tallink AutoExpress 2 | 1997 | 2009 | 5,419 GRT | Sank at Guanta | |
| Rosa Eugenia | 1978 | 2008 | 6,507 GRT | Sank in Puerto La Cruz | |
| Maria Rosario | 1978 | 2006 | 2,736 GRT | Abandoned and sank in Puerto La Cruz alongside Concepcion Mariño | |
| Lilia Concepcion | 1999 | 2002 | 5,992 GRT | Disappeared from AIS, 2022. Scrapped in 2023. | |
| Carmen Ernestina | 1999 | 1999 | 5,992 GRT | Sank in Puerto la Cruz | |
| Cacica Isabel | 1979 | 1979 | 2,640 GRT | Abandoned in Puerto La Cruz, towed to Puerto Cabello and sank | |
| Concepcion Mariño | 1978 | 1978 | 2,635 GRT | Abandoned and sank in Puerto La Cruz alongside Maria Rosario | |
