= Euroferrys =

Spanish ferry company

- Industry: Passenger transportation Freight transportation
- Founded: 1998
- Defunct: 2008
- Fate: Acquired by Acciona Trasmediterránea
- Headquarters: Algeciras, Spain
- Area served: Strait of Gibraltar
- Website: www.euroferrys.com

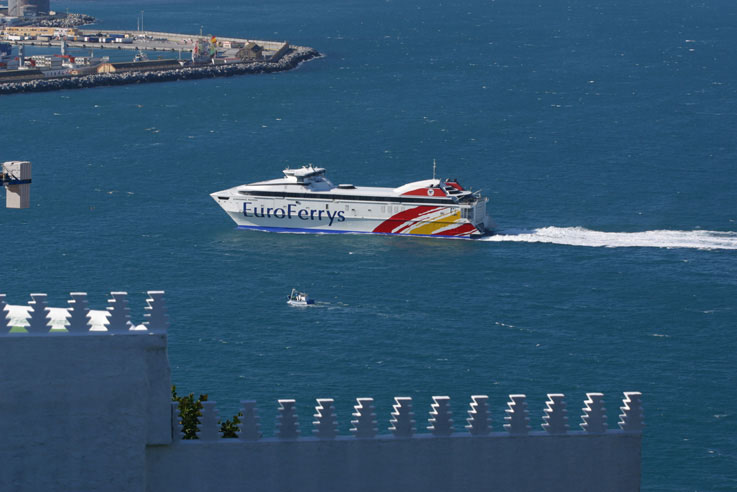
Euroferrys Pacifica

Euroferrys was a Spanish ferry company that operated a passenger and freight roll-on/roll-off service between Algeciras and the North African ports of Tangier and Ceuta.

== Timeline ==
- 1998 - Commenced operations.
- 2006 - Acquired by Acciona Trasmediterránea.
- 2008 - Merged with parent company Acciona Trasmediterránea.
- 2010 - HSC Euroferrys Atlantica repainted in Acciona Trasmediterránea livery.

== Fleet ==
Euroferrys operated two fast ferries and five conventional vessels during its 10 years in operation.

- Euroferrys Pacífica
- Euroferrys Primero
- Bahia De Ceuta
- Euroferrys Atlantica
- Giulia d'Abundo
- Punta Europa
- Mistral

== See also ==
- FerriMaroc
