= Guanta Municipality =

Guanta Municipality Municipio Guanta
- Municipality
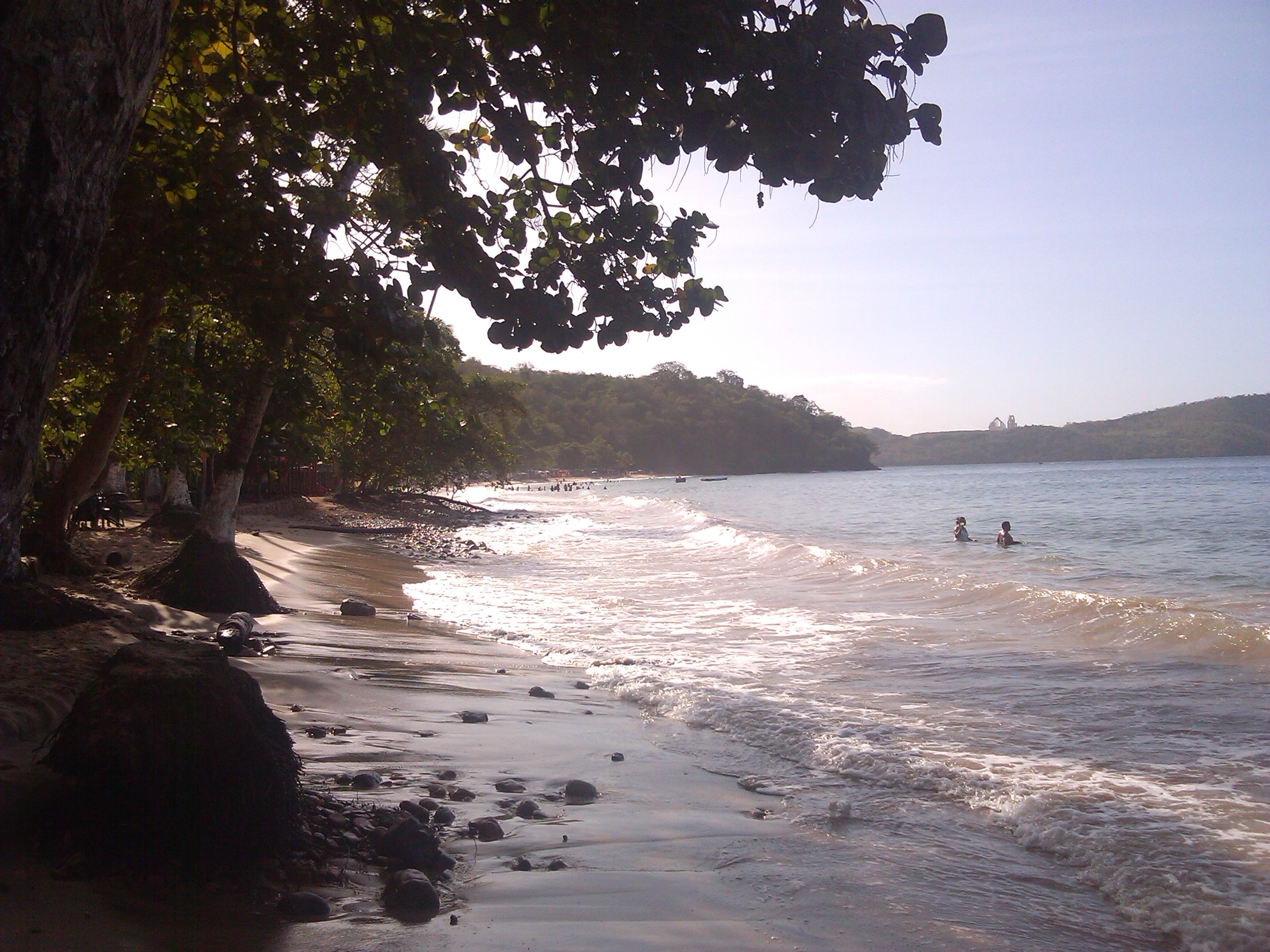

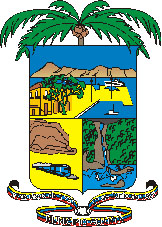
- Flag Coat of arms

- Location in Anzoátegui

- Location in Venezuela
- Coordinates: 10°12′55″N 64°33′15″W
- Country: Venezuela
- State: Anzoátegui
- Municipal seat: Guanta

Government
  - Mayor: Yinder Saldivia Medina (PSUV)

Area
  - Total: 173.2 km^{2} (66.9 sq mi)

Population (2011 census)
  - Total: 30,891
  - Density: 178.4/km^{2} (461.9/sq mi)
- Time zone: UTC−4 (VET)
- Area code(s): 0281

The Guanta Municipality is one of the 21 municipalities (municipios) that makes up the eastern Venezuelan state of Anzoátegui and, according to the 2011 census by the National Institute of Statistics of Venezuela, the municipality has a population of 30,891. The town of Guanta is the shire town of the Guanta Municipality.

== History ==
Guanta dates from the completion of the railway to the coal mines of Naricual and Capiricual nearly 19 kilometres (12 mi) beyond Barcelona, and was created for the shipment of coal.

== Demographics ==
The Guanta Municipality, according to a 2007 population estimate by the National Institute of Statistics of Venezuela, had a population of 31,629 (up from 28,542 in 2000). This amounted to 2.1% of the state's population. The municipality's population density is 472.07 inhabitants per square kilometre (1,222.7/sq mi).

== Government ==
The mayor of the Guanta Municipality is Jhonnathan Marín, elected on 23 November 2008 with 58% of the vote. He replaced Luis Alfredo Cardozo Belizario shortly after the elections. The municipality is divided into two parishes; Guanta and Chorrerón (previous to 27 June 1995, the Guanta Municipality contained only a single).

== See also ==
- Guanta
- Anzoátegui
- Municipalities of Venezuela
