= MV Quiberon =

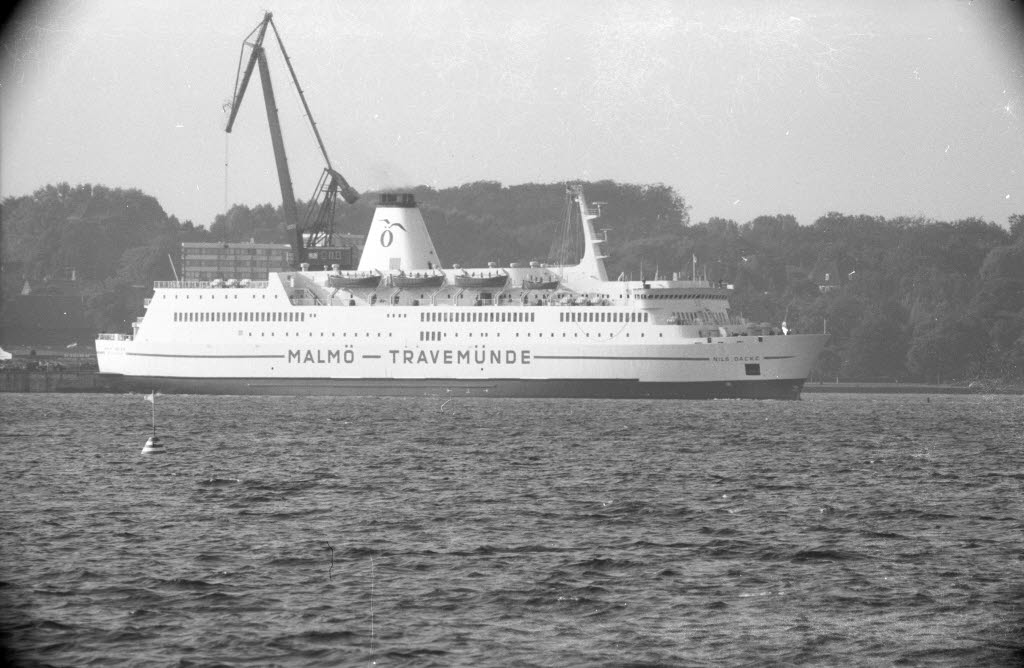
- Nils Dacke on her delivery voyage, June 1975

History
- Name: Giulia d' Abundo (2003-2010); Quiberon (1982-2003); Nils Dacke (1975-1982)
- Owner: Medmar International SRL (2003-2010); Trovil Shipping Ltd (2002-2003); Brittany Ferries (1984-2002); Svenska Lastbils AB (1975-1984); Lion Ferry AB (1975)
- Operator: Medmar (2007-2010); Acciona Trasmediterranea (2007); Medmar (2006-2007); Euroferrys (2006); Medmar (2003-2006); Brittany Ferries (1982-2003); TT-Saga-Line (1981-1982); Saga-Linjen (1976-1981); Malmo-Travemunde Linjen (1976); Svenska Rederi AB Oresund (1975-1976)
- Port of registry: Bassetere, St Kitts
- Builder: Werft Nobiskrug GmbH, Rendsburg, Germany
- Launched: 1975
- Identification: IMO number: 7362110
- Fate: Scrapped 2010

General characteristics
- Tonnage: 11,813 gross tonnage (GT)
- Length: 129.01 m (423.3 ft)
- Beam: 21.06 m (69.1 ft)
- Propulsion: Four Stork Werkspoor 6TM140
- Speed: 20 kn (37.0 km/h)

Quiberon was a ferry operated by Brittany Ferries between 1982 and 2002. She then operated on the Mediterranean for Euroferrys under the name Guila D'Abundo. In 2010, she was renamed D'Abundo and sent to Alang for scrapping.

== Routes served ==
- Plymouth-Santander, Plymouth-Roscoff and Roscoff-Cork 1982-1989
- Plymouth-Roscoff, with winter sailings on Portsmouth/Plymouth-St Malo as well, 1989-2002
- Portsmouth-Caen 2002

From her launch and throughout her service with Brittany Ferries her Port of Registry was Morlaix.

== 1992 Fire ==
Quiberon suffered an engine room fire on 17 July 1992 which claimed the life of one crew member. Crossing from Plymouth to Roscoff with 1,034 passengers aboard, the ship put out an emergency call which resulted in British and French air sea rescue helicopters scrambling to the ship's aid. The fire was extinguished by the ship's own crew before land-based assistance could come aboard, but passengers were mustered and lifeboats swung out as a precaution. Quiberon remained out of service for much of the rest of the summer season, not reappearing from repairs until the end of August. As a result of this fire, the ship received some rather unflattering newspaper headlines.

== Onboard facilities ==
Facilities available on board the Quiberon included 2 cinemas, 2 restaurants, a Salon de Thé, 4 shops and more than 280 cabins. She received a full renovation prior to entering service in 1982 and another one in 1990.

== Statistics ==
- Gross tonnage: 11,813
- Length: 129 m
- Beam: 21.06 m
- Speed: 20 knots
- Crew: 100
- Cars: 260
- Passengers: 1,302
