= Canadian American Transportation Systems =

Canadian American Transportation Systems LLC
- Type: Limited liability company
- Industry: Shipping
- Defunct: 2004
- Fate: Dissolved
- Headquarters: Rochester, United States
- Area served: Lake Ontario
- Key people: Howard Thomas, President
- Services: Passenger transportation, Freight transportation
- Website: www.spiritofontario.com

Canadian American Transportation Systems LLC (CATS) was a company based in Rochester, New York which operated an international passenger and vehicle ferry service on Lake Ontario, connecting Rochester with Toronto.

== History ==
CATS was established in the early 2000s by several local business leaders in upstate New York, after the City of Rochester solicited bids from companies interested in establishing such a ferry service. After the City of Rochester built a marine passenger terminal, CATS ordered a high-speed catamaran vessel from Austal Ships in Perth, Western Australia, based on a modified version of the Auto-Express 86 model. The modifications were mostly in terms of the vessel's beam (or width), as it needed to be able to transit through the locks of the St. Lawrence Seaway. The vessel's registered name was Spirit of Ontario I and it arrived at Rochester on April 27, 2004.

CATS heavily promoted the service and ran a contest with citizens in Ontario and New York for a marketing name for its operation, with the prize being a lifetime boarding pass. The winning name for the service was "The Breeze" and many people assumed this was the name of the vessel, however its registered name remained Spirit of Ontario I. The ferry is more than 280 feet long and can carry more than 750 passengers and 220 cars. The ferry features bars, a restaurant, movie theater, children's play area, business class, wireless Internet service, and an arcade.

Scott Associates Architects was selected as the designer for the International Marine Passenger Terminal in the Inner Harbour area of Toronto. The vessel began daily service between both ports with several 2.5 hour crossings per day, beginning on June 17, 2004. By the mid-summer, most crossings were at or near capacity and the service appeared to be successful.

Since the vessel was operating between two international ports, CATS decided to register Spirit of Ontario I under the flag of Bahamas, a flag of convenience nation, to avoid Canadian or U.S. taxes. It was still required to meet all United States Coast Guard and Canadian Coast Guard safety requirements, however Canadian and U.S. registered vessels had the benefit of not requiring to pay for pilotage services, a requirement for all foreign registered vessels.

== End of the line ==
This decision by CATS (which cost upwards of $6000/crossing), along with a series of unfortunate events related to charges for customs and immigration services, marine passenger terminal facilities in Toronto, and a poorly executed business plan, not to mention various delays in seeing the start of service, saw CATS shut down the entire operation on September 7, 2004, after only 11 weeks of service.

Following the CATS bankruptcy, the vessel remained docked in Rochester. On February 28, 2005 a bankruptcy auction sold Spirit of Ontario I for $32 million (USD) to Rochester Ferry Company LLC, a subsidiary of the City of Rochester. Rochester Ferry Company LLC announced in April 2005 that it had selected Bay Ferries Great Lakes Limited to operate the service using Spirit of Ontario I, with the service marketed under the name "The Cat". The service resumed June 30, 2005.

== See also ==
- Owen Sound Transportation Company
