= Kattegatruten =

Kattegatruten A/S
- Industry: Shipping
- Founded: 2011
- Defunct: 12.10.2013
- Headquarters: Aarhus, Denmark
- Area served: Kattegat
- Services: Passenger transportation Freight transportation
- Parent: FRS Group
- Website: www.kattegat-ruten.dk

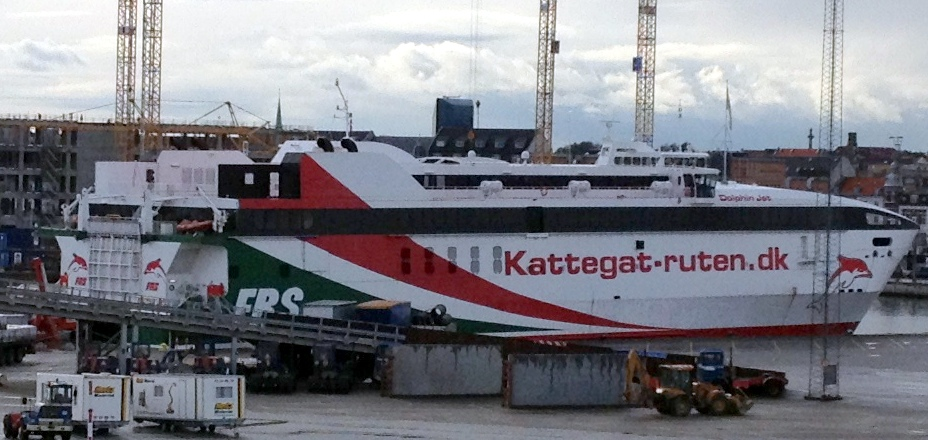
Dolphin Jet

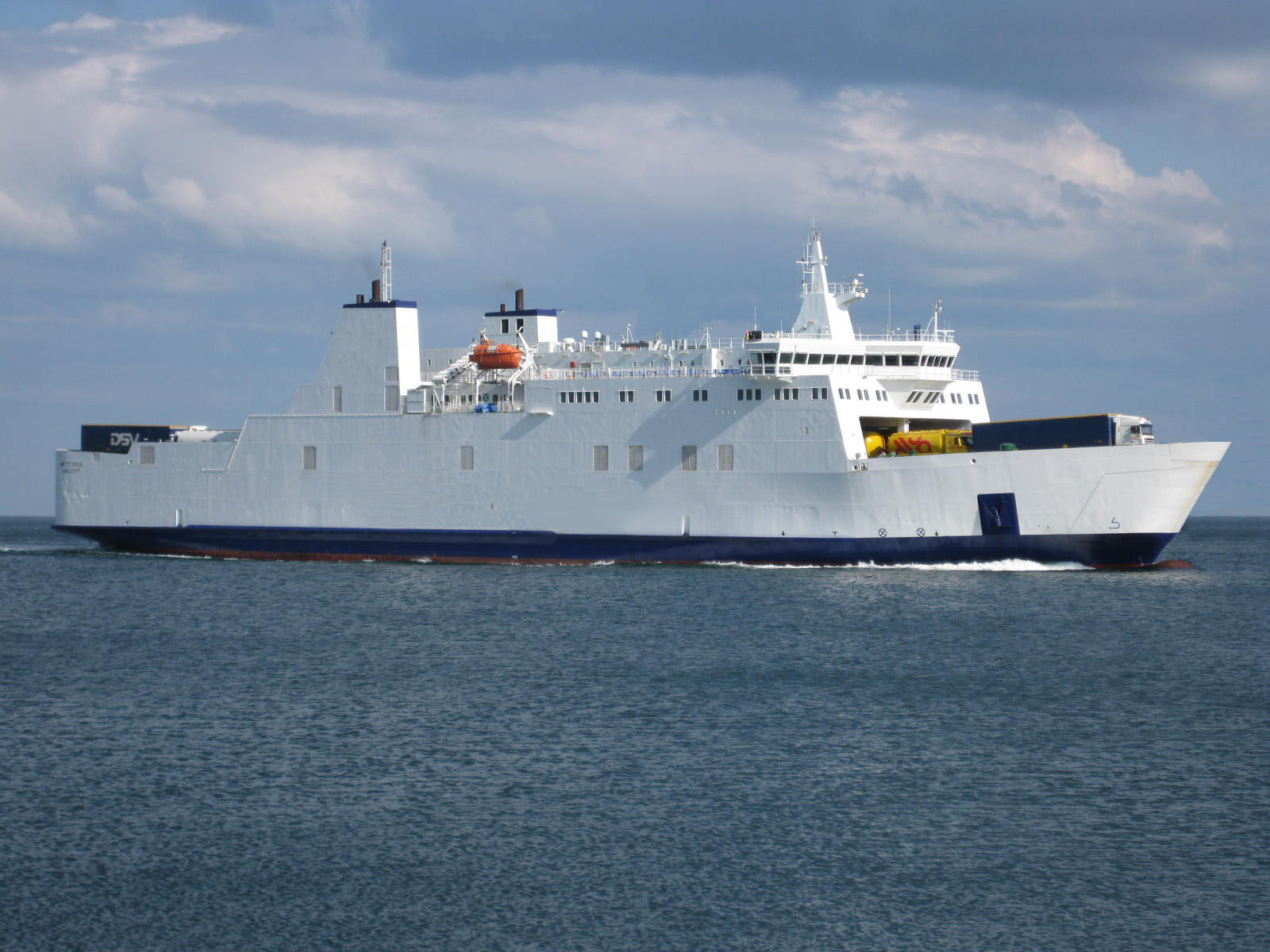
Kattegat

Kattegatruten is a Danish company that operated a passenger and freight service across the Kattegat.

The company began operations in September 2011 after Mols-Linien withdrew from the Aarhus - Kalundborg route. This route was suspended in October 2013.

== Routes ==
Kattegatruten operated one route across the Kattegat from 2011 to 2013.

- Aarhus - Kalundborg
