= Punta de Piedras, Magdalena =

Punta de Piedras, Colombia
- Village
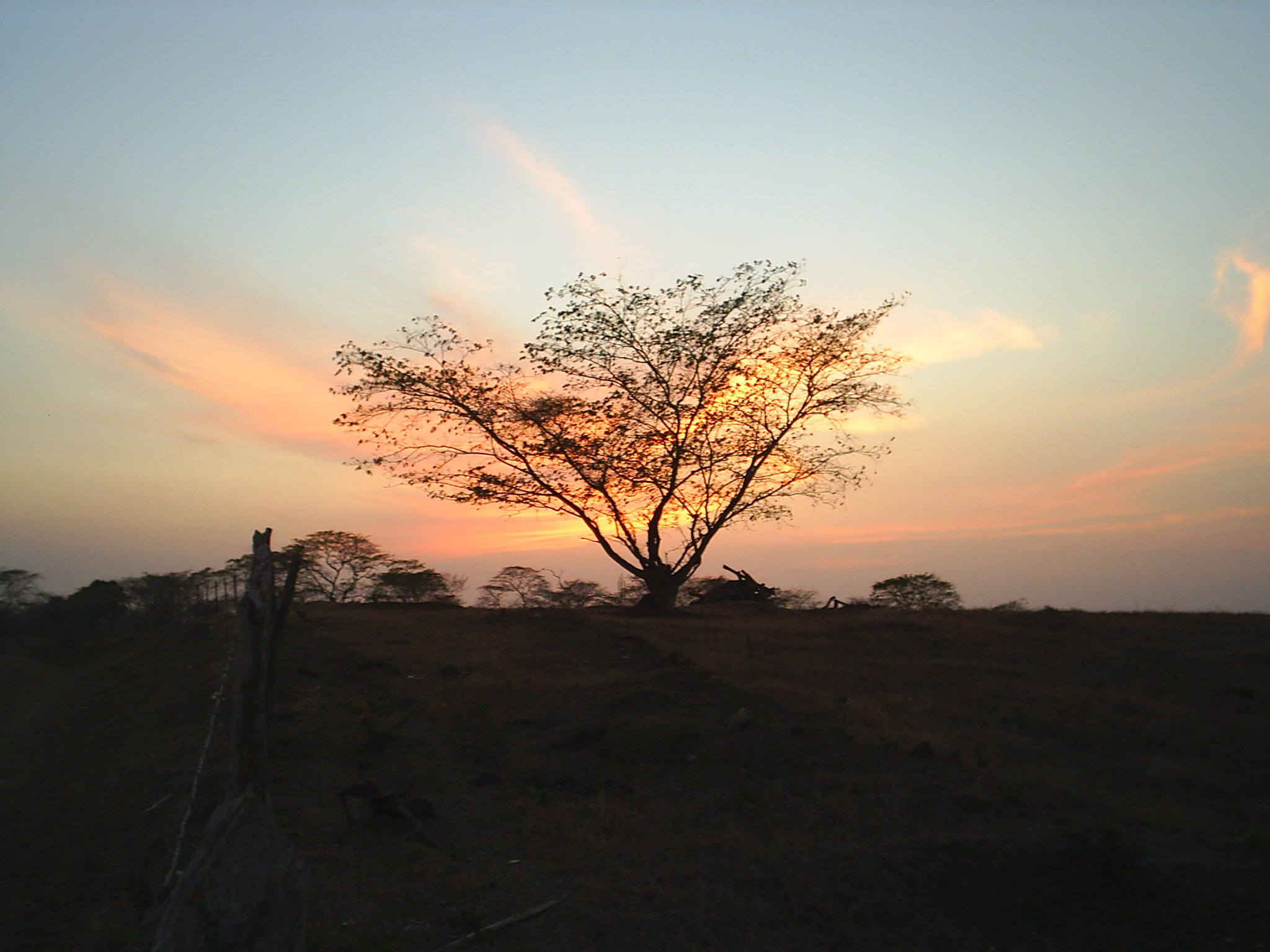
- Sunset in Punta de Piedras
- Interactive map of Punta de Piedras, Colombia
- Coordinates: 10°10′N 74°43′W
- Country: Colombia
- Department: Magdalena
- Municipalities of Colombia: Pivijay

Punta de Piedras is a settlement in the Colombian Department of Magdalena. It is located 35 km southwest of Pivijay.

This settlement is not to be confused with Punta de Piedras in Isla Margarita.
