= HSC Virgen de Coromoto =

High-speed ferry

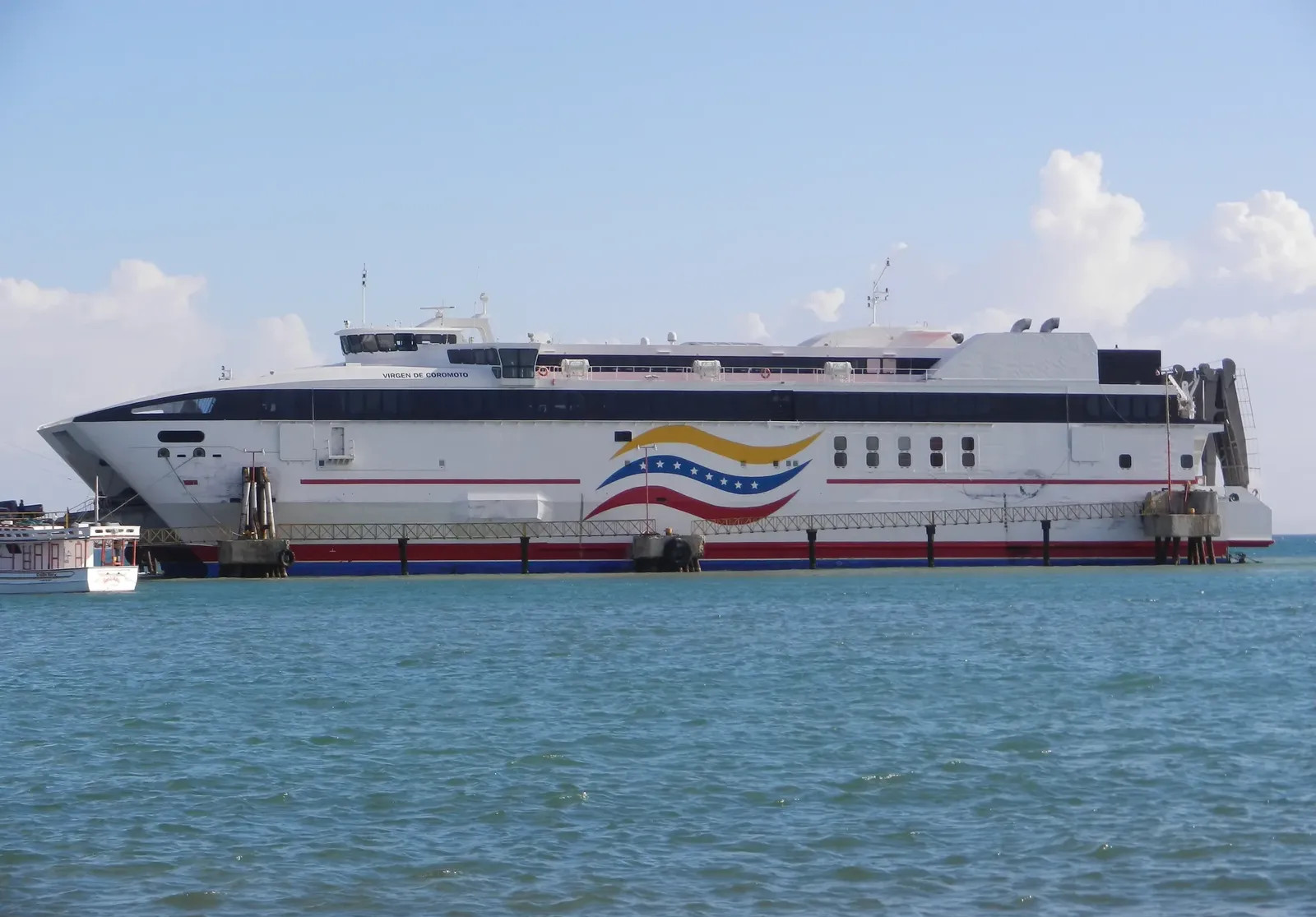
- Virgen de Coromoto in Punta de Piedras

History
- Name: 2004–2007: Spirit of Ontario I; 2007–2012: Tanger Jet II; 2012-2013: Dolphin Jet; 2013-onwards: Virgen de Coromoto
- Owner: Conferry
- Operator: 2004–2006: CATS; 2006–2007: laid up; 2007–2012: FRS Iberia; 2012-2013: Kattegatruten; 2013: FRS Iberia
- Port of registry: 2004–2007: Nassau (The Bahamas); 2007–2012: Tangier (Morocco); 2012-2013: Limassol (Cyprus); 2013-onwards: Pampatar (Venezuela)
- Builder: Austal
- Yard number: 251
- Launched: 6 October 2003
- Completed: 2004
- Identification: IMO number: 9279264; MMSI number: 775513000; Callsign: YYNG

General characteristics
- Length: 86.60 m (284.1 ft)
- Beam: 23.80 m (78.1 ft)
- Draft: 3.20 m (10.5 ft)
- Installed power: 4 × MTU 20V 8000 M70 diesel engines
- Propulsion: 4 x Lips LJ120E Waterjets
- Speed: up to 45 knots (83 km/h; 52 mph)
- Capacity: 774 passengers; 238 cars

The HSC Virgen de Coromoto is an 86 m (282 ft) fast catamaran ferry operated by Consolidada de Ferrys C.A. in Venezuela. It was built in Australia in 2004 for a fast ferry service on Lake Ontario between Toronto, Ontario, Canada and Rochester, New York, United States. After the ferry service failed, the boat was sold in 2007 and operated in the Strait of Gibraltar on a Spain-Morocco service until 2012. In 2012–13, the ship operated on Kattegatruten's Aarhus–Kalundborg route in Denmark until October 2013 when the route was cancelled.

== Vessel specifications ==
The vessel was built in 2004 at Austal in Perth, Australia. The catamaran has an overall length of 86.60 meters and a beam of 23.80 m. Her gross tonnage amounts 6,242 GT. The machinery consists of four MTU engines with a total output of 4 x 8,200 kW (44,595 HP) allowing a maximum service speed of 45 knots (83 km/h). The vessel has a capacity for 774 passengers and 238 car-equivalents (or a maximum of 10 trucks and 150 cars) can be accommodated on board.

== History of Rochester–Toronto ferry service ==
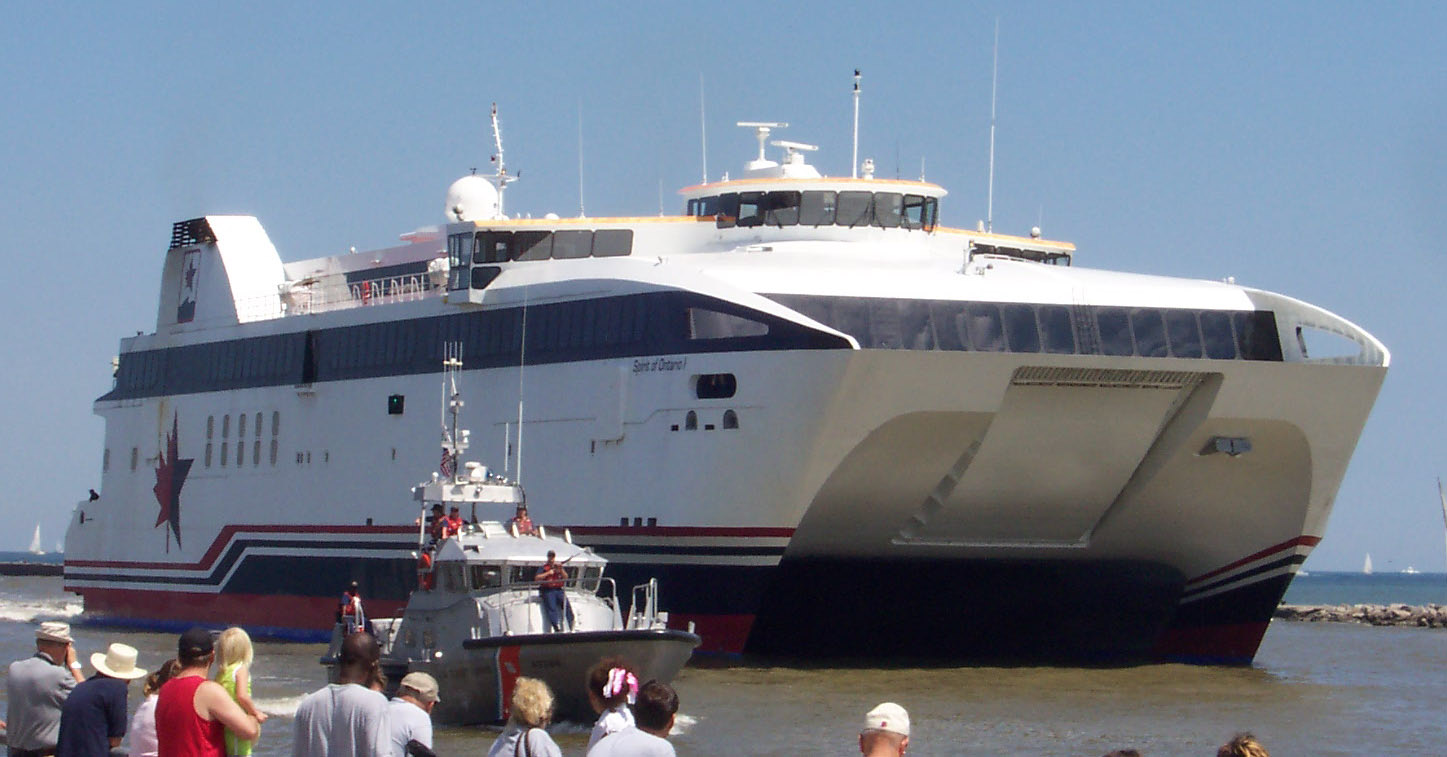
Spirit of Ontario I arriving at the port of Rochester

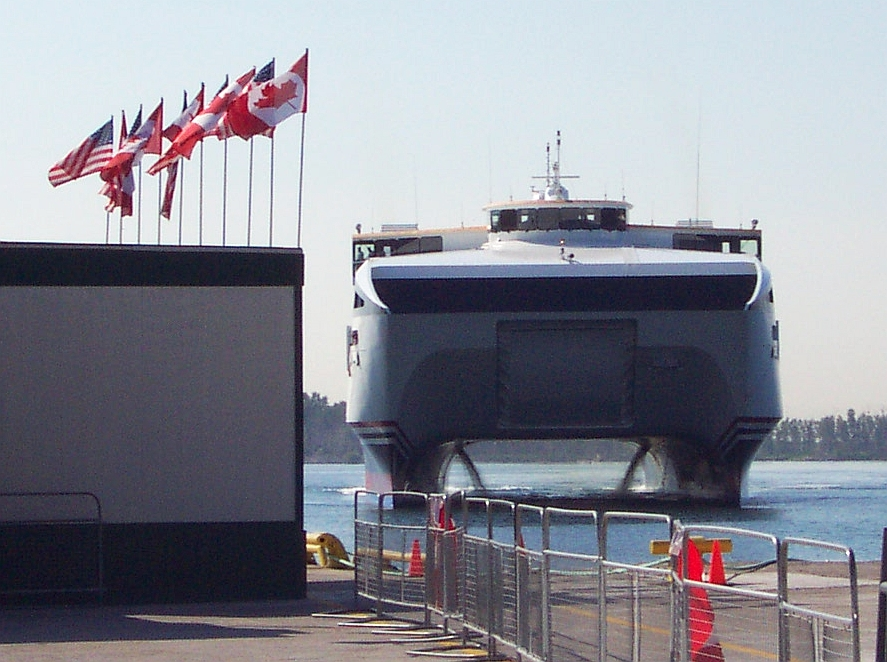
Spirit of Ontario I arriving in Toronto

The vessel was delivered by Austal in 2004 and christened Spirit of Ontario I for the operator Canadian American Transportation Systems (CATS) on an 82 nautical miles (94 mi; 152 km) route across Lake Ontario, linking the ports of Rochester, New York, and Toronto, Ontario. A high-speed ferry service between the two ports was discussed and spearheaded by local politicians and business leaders, primarily in upstate New York, beginning in the 1990s and continuing until the early 2000s. The city of Rochester built a ferry terminal in speculation of such a service being implemented.

=== 2004 season ===
A group of investors formed a U.S. company named Canadian American Transportation Systems (CATS) which then entered into a contract to build Spirit of Ontario I with Austal in 2003.

The vessel left Perth on February 17, 2004, crossing the Pacific Ocean and transiting the Panama Canal, reaching New York City on April 1, 2004. The vessel's aluminum hull was slightly damaged while docking for a public relations event at the South Street Seaport, forcing Austal to perform emergency repairs before continuing on through the Gulf of St. Lawrence and St. Lawrence Seaway, arriving in Rochester on April 27, 2004.

CATS promoted the new service, aiming to begin operations in early May 2004. As part of their promotional activities during the months leading up to Spirit of Ontario I arriving on Lake Ontario, CATS marketers created a competition for free boarding passes whereby members of the public could submit suggestions for the service's official "nickname". The winning entry was "The Breeze", but its registered name remained Spirit of Ontario I. "The Breeze" was only used as a CATS marketing strategy and as a registered trademark for the service itself.

==== Troubles with start-up ====
The early May 2004 start-up of operations was not feasible for several reasons:

- Hull repairs in New York City in April, pushing back the delivery date.
- Unexpected engine repairs in May and early June 2004 after arriving on Lake Ontario.
- A dispute over payment for Canadian customs services in Toronto. The federal government of Canada passed a law in the 1990s whereby any privately owned new border crossing point (such as a ferry service or private toll bridge) must pay for its customs services at no cost to Canadian taxpayers.
- Ongoing construction of a ferry terminal in Toronto. A temporary terminal building and parking lot was rushed to completion for the spring startup of operations while construction of a permanent passenger terminal began.

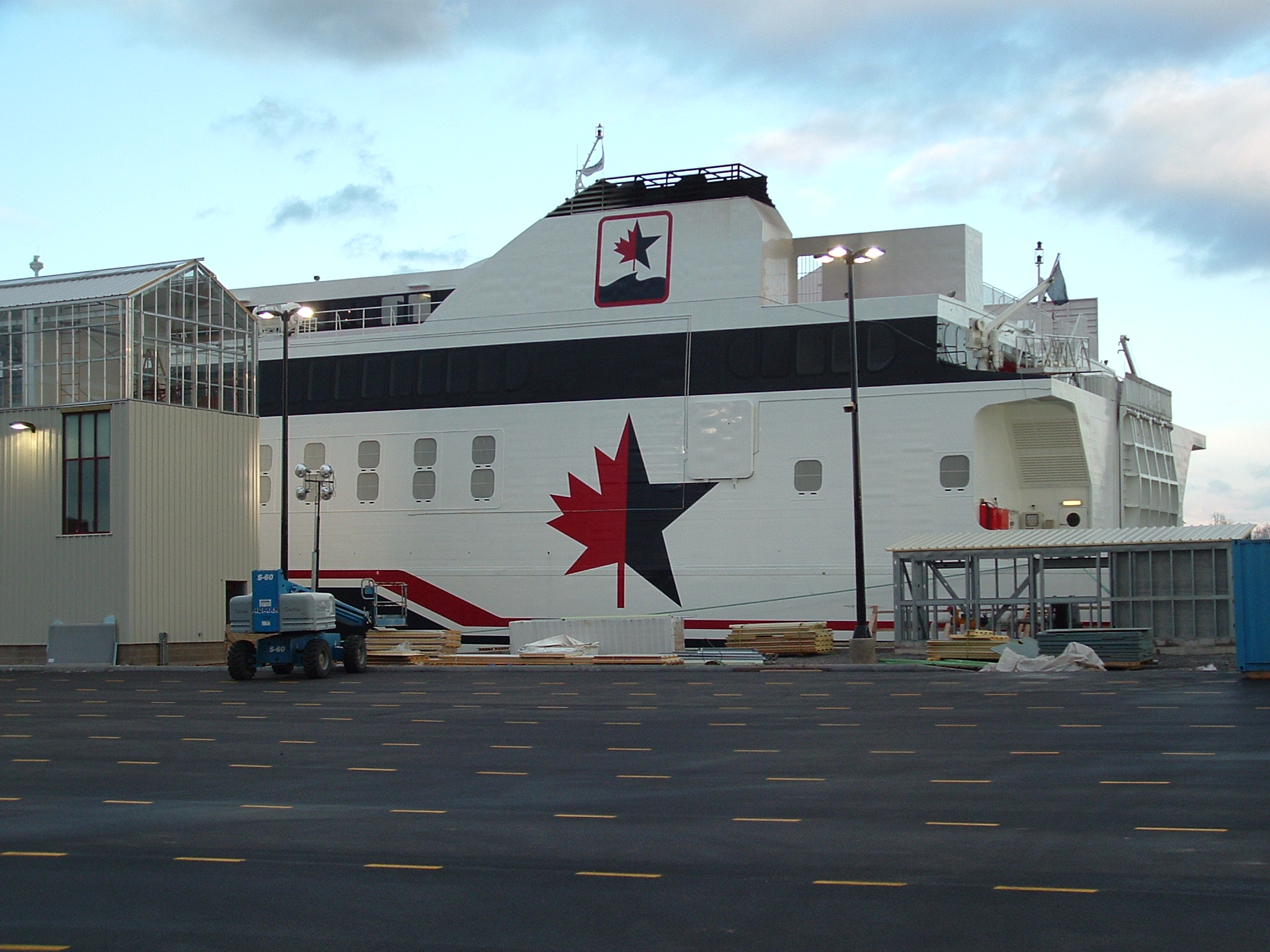
The rear portion of the "Spirit of Ontario I" sporting its old maple leaf and star logo. In the foreground is the Port of Rochester under construction.

The accumulated delays pushed the start-up date for Spirit of Ontario I to June 17, 2004. In the meantime, Lake Express, a much smaller high-speed catamaran ferry, also built by Austal Ships (in Alabama), went into service on Lake Michigan, laying claim to being the first high-speed car ferry service on the Great Lakes.

==== Troubles with operations ====
After operations began, Spirit of Ontario I performed reliably in daily service between Rochester and Toronto, making one or two round trips daily with a total crossing time of 2.5 hours including loading/discharging and customs/immigration clearance. The service initially had relatively low ridership due to the uncertainties over start-up earlier in the spring and from poor marketing and lack of highway signage in Toronto. These difficulties were overcome by early August 2004 and the vessel was carrying close to full capacity throughout this month. The service had reportedly carried over 100,000 passengers by September.

CATS suspended the Spirit of Ontario I ferry service indefinitely on September 7, 2004 with the company citing financial problems related to initial delays in getting the vessel operational and missing its first service launch date in May.

Contributing factors to the ferry company's financial difficulties were reported to be:

- Slow progress by the Toronto Port Authority in constructing the permanent International Marine Passenger Terminal in Toronto. The delays in getting even temporary terminal facilities built in Toronto during the spring of 2004 was another reason for forcing a delay in starting the service until mid-June.
- CATS felt that it was being charged excessive Canadian customs and immigration costs. U.S. port of entry services were being provided in Rochester at no cost to CATS whereas Canadian port of entry services had to be completely covered by the company, resulting in a hidden charge on each ticket price.
- CATS blamed U.S. customs for not giving approval for the Spirit of Ontario I to carry freight trucks and express cargo, claiming that this altered the original business plan.
- CATS endured criticism from both nations for a decision to have Spirit of Ontario I registered under the flag of Bahamas, a flag of convenience nation, allegedly for taxation purposes. CATS was able to do this since the vessel was operating in an international service; additionally, since Spirit of Ontario I was a foreign-built vessel, CATS would have had to pay significant penalties were it to register the vessel in either Canada or the U.S. (particularly the U.S., given the domestic-content restrictions of the Jones Act).
- Because of the foreign flag registry for Spirit of Ontario I, CATS was required to pay for pilotage services on every crossing (approx. $6000 per crossing). Canadian and U.S. registered vessels are exempt from requiring the services of pilots while navigating on the Great Lakes.

CATS declared bankruptcy in the fall of 2004 and Spirit of Ontario I was seized by the United States Marshals Service for resale to pay creditors. The vessel remained tied up at the Rochester ferry terminal throughout the fall and winter of 2004–2005.

=== 2005 service resumption ===
Toronto's permanent terminal for use by passenger/vehicle ferries and passenger cruise ships was completed in early 2005. The facility is located adjacent to the now-dismantled temporary terminal at the Cherry Street slip in Toronto's inner harbour. The Cherry Street slip location has proven to be controversial among Torontonians as it is located in a former industrial area approximately 6 kilometres (3.7 mi) southeast of the downtown core and has no convenient public transit connections for pedestrians.

On February 28, 2005, US Marshals conducted a bankruptcy auction in Rochester for Spirit of Ontario I; the winning bidder was the "Rochester Ferry Company LLC", a subsidiary of the city of Rochester with a reported bid of US$32 million. Rochester Ferry Company LLC was successful in financing this bid through a loan from the Australian federal government.

Rochester Ferry Company LLC announced in April 2005 that Northumberland Ferries Limited (NFL), the parent company of Bay Ferries Limited, was selected to manage and operate the ferry service and vessel. NFL formed Bay Ferries Great Lakes (BFGL) to operate the service. Rochester Ferry Company LLC also committed to reflagging Spirit of Ontario I from the Bahamas to the United States, in order to avoid paying the expensive pilotage fees accorded to non-US or Canadian registered vessels on the Great Lakes. In December 2005 the vessel was still Bahamian flagged, pending the completion of training of an all-US crew; such training was anticipated to be completed within the next few months.

BFGL and Rochester Ferry Company LLC agreed upon two major projects relating to starting service with Spirit of Ontario I by June 17, 2005, namely:

- The bankruptcy by CATS, the vessel's first owners, voided any warranty on the MTU engines. Rochester Ferry Company LLC, using its Australian-backed financing, came to an agreement with MTU in April 2005 which saw the ferry company pay US$1.3 million to MTU in order to keep the vessel's propulsion systems under warranty.
- The vessel required a hull inspection, re-painting (to remove the old CATS logo and "The Breeze" marketing name), and minor repairs. The vessel sailed to Lake Ontario's only remaining shipyard (the Port Weller Dry Dock) in St. Catharines, Ontario in early May 2005. While in dry dock, a problem was discovered with the propulsion system, requiring modifications to software. MTU also began conducting warranty repair and maintenance work on the vessel's engines.

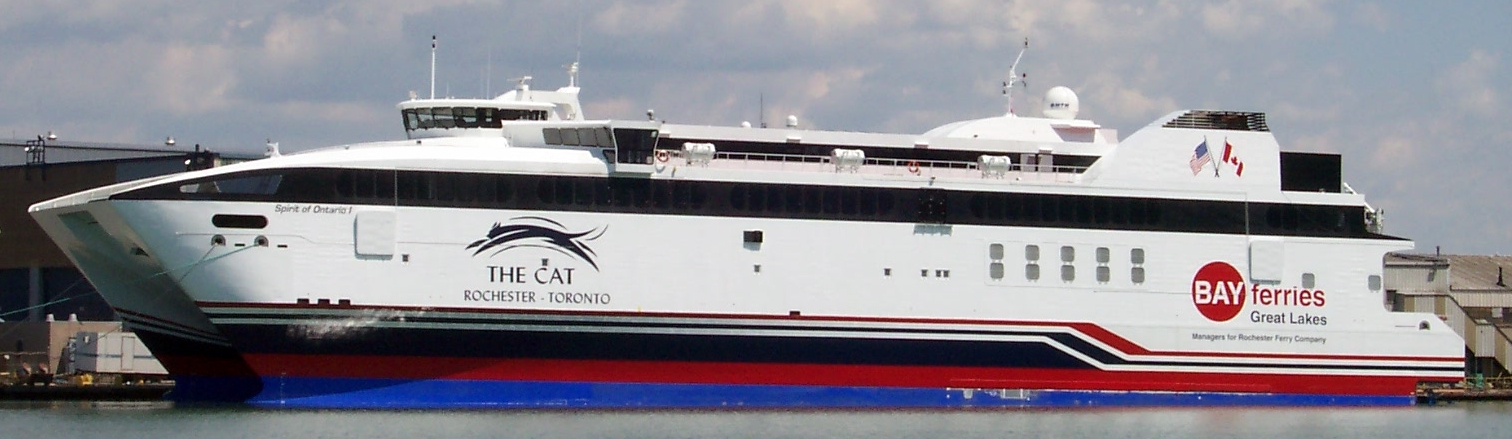
Spirit of Ontario I at Port Weller dry dock, with new logo

The vessel was repainted with new logos featuring Bay Ferries Great Lakes, as well as a new marketing name for the Rochester-Toronto high-speed ferry service; "The Cat" is the same marketing name as used by BFGL's sister company Bay Ferries on the Yarmouth, Nova Scotia to Bar Harbor, Maine high-speed ferry service since 1998.

Upon returning to Rochester, BFGL began hiring employees and performing crew training and emergency drills. Several test crossings were conducted between Rochester and Toronto during early June 2005.

High-speed ferry service between Rochester and Toronto was restarted on June 30, 2005, 13 days late. The ferry service was scheduled to run year-round; however, on December 8, 2005, BFGL announced that it would suspend service for the winter on December 12, 2005, and attempt to charter the vessel for ferry service in the Caribbean during the winter.

=== 2006 funding cut ===
On January 10, 2006, newly elected mayor of Rochester Robert Duffy announced that the city government would not be approving the ferry board's request for additional funding for the city's subsidiary Rochester Ferry Company LLC so that the service could resume in the summer. This effectively killed any hope that Spirit of Ontario I would return to its Lake Ontario operation. The city of Rochester owed BFGL $2.5 million in a revenue guarantee and the vessel should be sold.

It was initially thought that Bay Ferries Great Lakes would consider acquiring Spirit of Ontario I as the company was given the first option on the vessel, should it ever be sold by Rochester Ferry Company LLC. However, BFGL did not exercise their option, and the City of Rochester began the process of closing down Rochester Ferry Company LLC by listing the vessel with international marine brokerage services.

=== Vessel for sale ===
On May 2, 2006, the city corporation announced that a British company named Euroferries Limited was purchasing the vessel for use on a cross-channel service. The selling price of $29.8 million was short of the $32 million the city had asked for, however, it was the highest of seven bids. Financing of the purchase was expected to be completed by the end of the summer however terms of the agreement were still being discussed by December 2006 and it appeared that the vessel would be captive on Lake Ontario when the St. Lawrence Seaway closed for the winter at the end of the month.

The Rochester Ferry Company LLC made the decision to move the ferry to the ice-free port of Shelburne, Nova Scotia (which had cheaper docking fees than Rochester) until the sale could be finalized, rather than leaving it in Rochester. The vessel's departure was quickly scheduled for the night of Thursday, December 21. A crowd gathered to bid farewell, and Mayor Duffy made a brief statement. The ferry left the Port of Rochester for good at about 6:45 PM, horn blaring. The vessel arrived at a shipyard in Halifax, Nova Scotia on December 26. Following repairs and inspections, Spirit of Ontario I continued to Shelburne in February 2007 where the vessel was docked pending sale negotiations.

== European routes ==
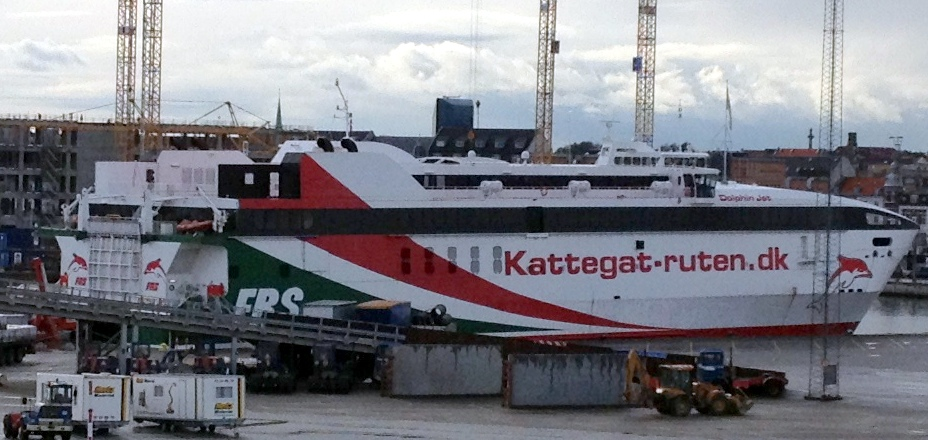
Kattegat-ruten Dolphin Jet in August 2012.

The vessel was sold in April 2007 to the German company Förde Reederei Seetouristik (FRC) for its ferry service between Tarifa, Spain and Tangiers, Morocco. The vessel was renamed Tanger Jet II.

In July 2012, the ship entered traffic between Kalundborg and Aarhus in Denmark for Kattegatruten, and was renamed Dolphin Jet. After only 24 days of service, the vessel was laid up in Aarhus. After the route was cancelled in October 2013, the vessel was sold to Venezuelan Conferry and renamed to Virgen de Coromoto.

== Venezuela ==
Conferry used the Virgen de Coromoto for ferry service to Margarita. The company failed to maintain the ship, and by mid-2015 it had broken down. In 2017 the Venezuelan government attempted to sell the ferry through the broker Unlimited Maritime Solutions, but failed to reach an agreement with any potential buyers. After this, the ship was towed to Puerto Cabello for repairs, where it remained as of 2019.
