= HSC Cecilia Payne =

Ferry boat built in 1999

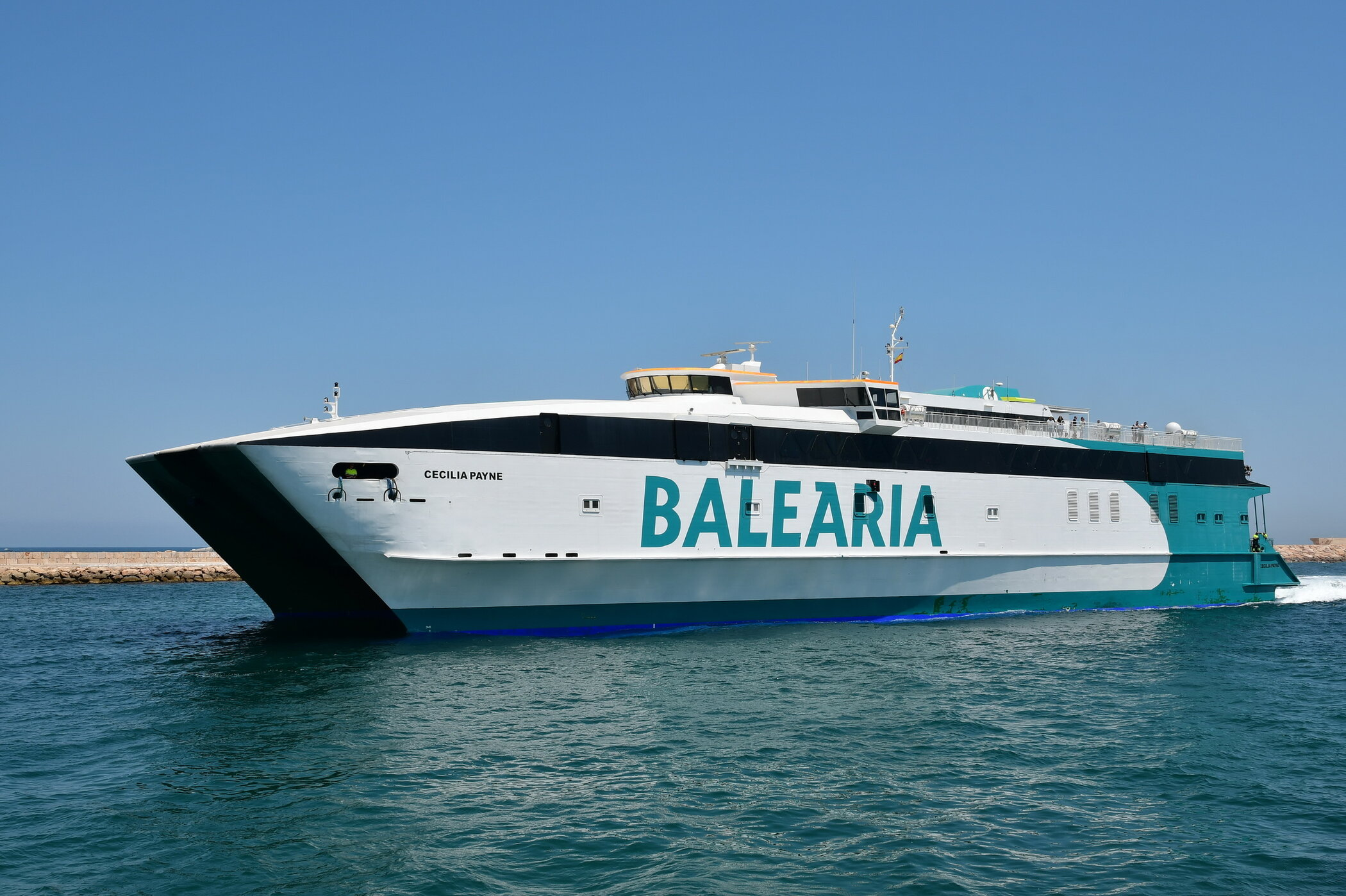
- Cecilia Payne in Denia

History
- Name: 1999–2018: Jonathan Swift; 2018 onwards: Cecilia Payne
- Operator: 1999–2018: Irish Ferries; 2018 onwards: Baleària
- Port of registry: (Cyprus) Limassol
- Builder: Austal Ships, Australia
- Cost: IR£29 million
- Yard number: 94
- Launched: February 1999
- Completed: April 1999
- In service: July 1999
- Identification: IMO number: 9188881
- Status: In service

General characteristics
- Type: High-speed catamaran
- Tonnage: 5,992 GT
- Length: 86.6 m (284 ft 1 in)
- Beam: 24.4 m (80 ft 1 in)
- Draught: 3.2 m (10 ft 6 in)
- Decks: 1 + Mezzanine/Swing Deck
- Deck clearance: 4.2M Full Height / 2.7M + 2.1M on Mezzanine
- Installed power: 4 × Caterpillar 3618 diesel engines
- Propulsion: 4 × Kamewa Waterjets
- Capacity: 800 passengers; 200 cars

HSC Cecilia Payne is a high-speed ferry owned and operated by Baleària. The vessel operates between Tarifa and Tanger. The vessel is named after British–American astrophysicist Cecilia Payne. Between 1999 and 2018 she was operated by Irish Ferries as Jonathan Swift.

== Design and construction ==
Cecilia Payne was constructed by Austal Ships in Henderson, Australia, at a cost IR£29 million. The vessel was launched in February 1999 and was delivered to Dublin in May 1999, before entering service in July 1999.

The vessel is of a catamaran design.

Power is provided by four Caterpillar 3618 diesel engines with a total output of 28,800 kW. The vessel employs four Kamewa waterjets for propulsion and has a service speed of 40 knots (75 km/h).

Jonathan Swift was designed to allow quick turnarounds at port. It is equipped with a bow door which allows vehicles to drive on at either end and drive straight off at the end of the journey. The vessel was able to use existing terminal facilities in both ports.

== Service ==
=== Irish Ferries ===
The introduction of Jonathan Swift was delayed due to an industrial dispute between Irish Ferries and the trade union SIPTU, who represented seven officers that had been transferred from the company's conventional ferry operations to man the new high-speed ferry. These officers refused to operate the vessel at lower manning levels which had been proposed by Irish Ferries. Irish Ferries threatened to sell or charter Jonathan Swift if the issue was not resolved.

On its entry into service in July 1999, Jonathan Swift increased Irish Ferries' passenger capacity on the Dublin-Holyhead route by 73%, and its car capacity by 50%. The vessel has spent its entire career on this route, operating alongside the company's conventional ferries.

=== Balearia ===
On 30 January 2018, Irish Continental Group announced that Jonathan Swift was to be sold to Balearia Eurolineas Maritimas S.A (Balearia) for a sum of €15.5m plus fees. The vessel was scheduled to be delivered to Balearia by the end of April 2018, in April 2018 it was renamed Cecilia Payne.
