= Guanta =

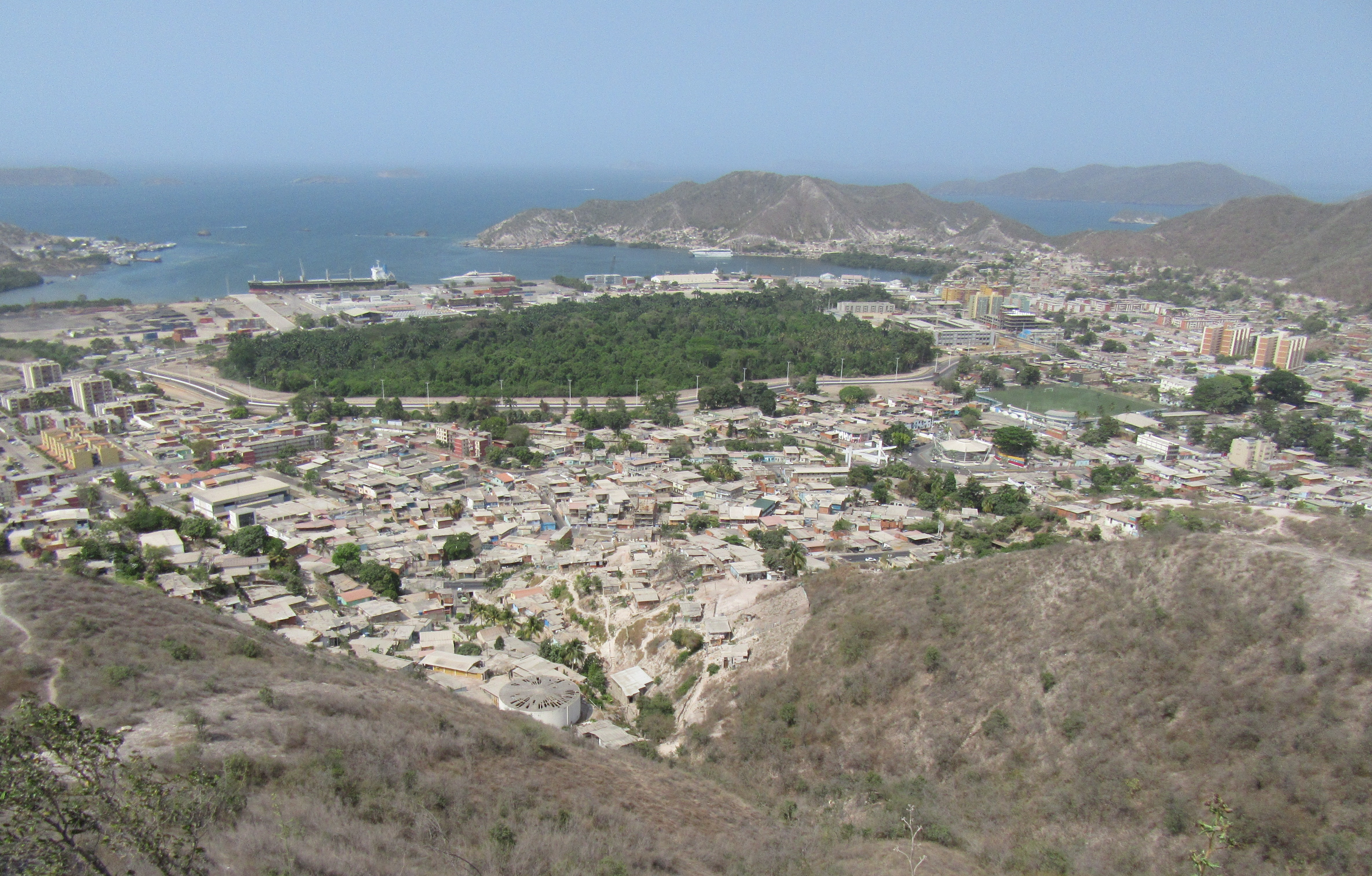

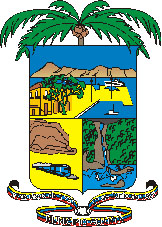
- Flag Coat of arms

- Location within Venezuela
- Coordinates: 10°14′18″N 64°35′30″W
- Country: Venezuela
- State: Anzoátegui
- Municipality: Guanta Municipality
- Founded: 1594

Area
  - Total: 67 km^{2} (26 sq mi)
- Elevation: 14 m (46 ft)

Population (2001)
  - Total: 35,000
  - Demonym: Guanteño/a
- Time zone: UTC−4 (VET)
- Postal code: 6014
- Area code: 0281
- Climate: BSh

Guanta is the capital and largest city of Guanta Municipality. Together with Barcelona, Puerto La Cruz and Lechería it forms a conurbation of around 1.2m inhabitants.

The town is named for the cacique Guantar of the Cumanagoto people, the indigenous inhabitants of the area at the time of the Spanish conquest. Formally founded in 1594, it was already an indigenous settlement before this time.

== See also ==
- List of cities and towns in Venezuela
