= Punta de Piedras, Nueva Esparta =

- Location within Venezuela
- country: Venezuela
- state: Nueva Esparta State

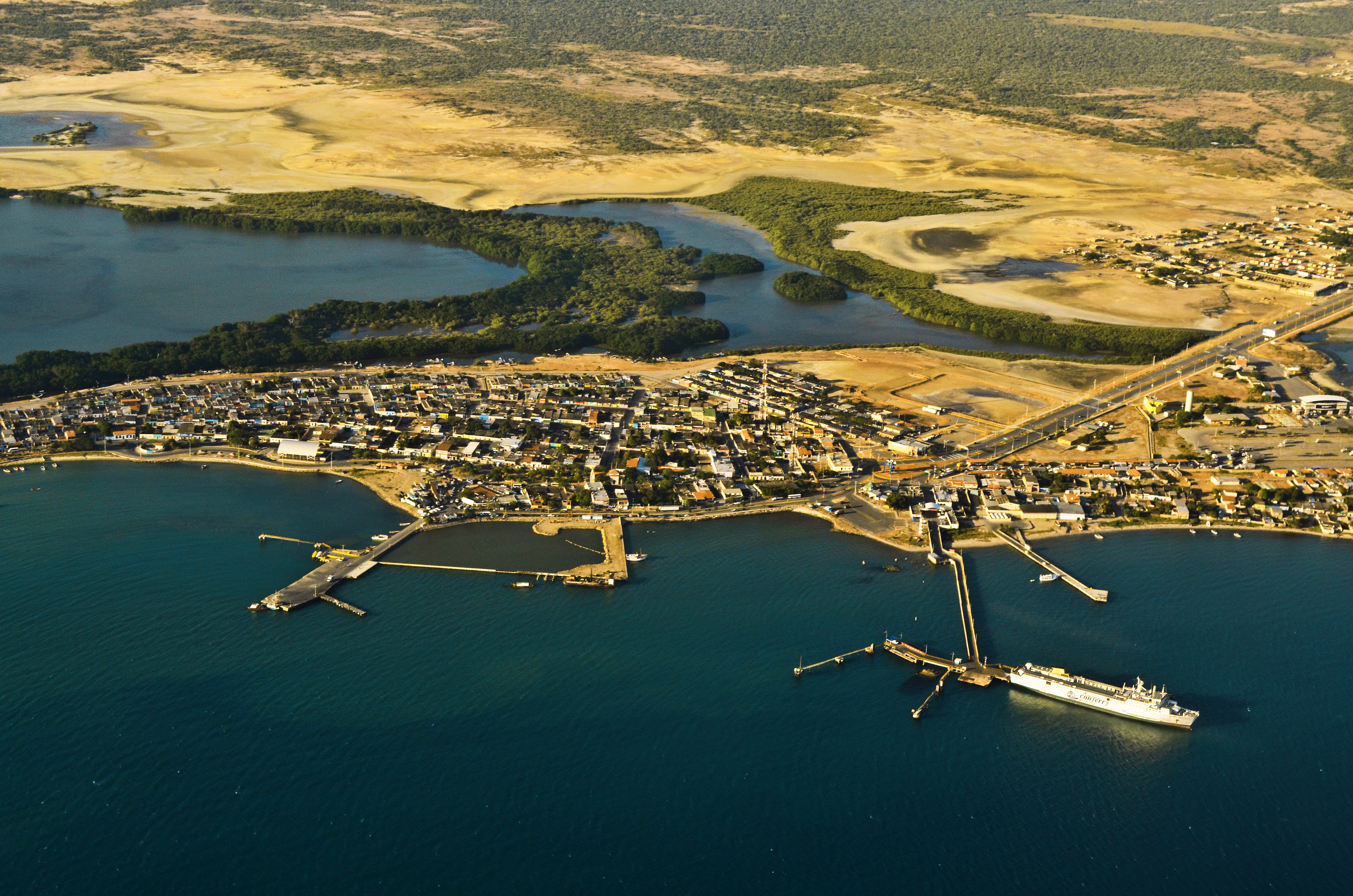
Punta de Piedras

Punta de Piedras is a town on Isla Margarita, in the state of Nueva Esparta, Venezuela. It is the capital of the Tubores Municipality.
