= WorldChampion Jet =

Passenger ferry, built 2000

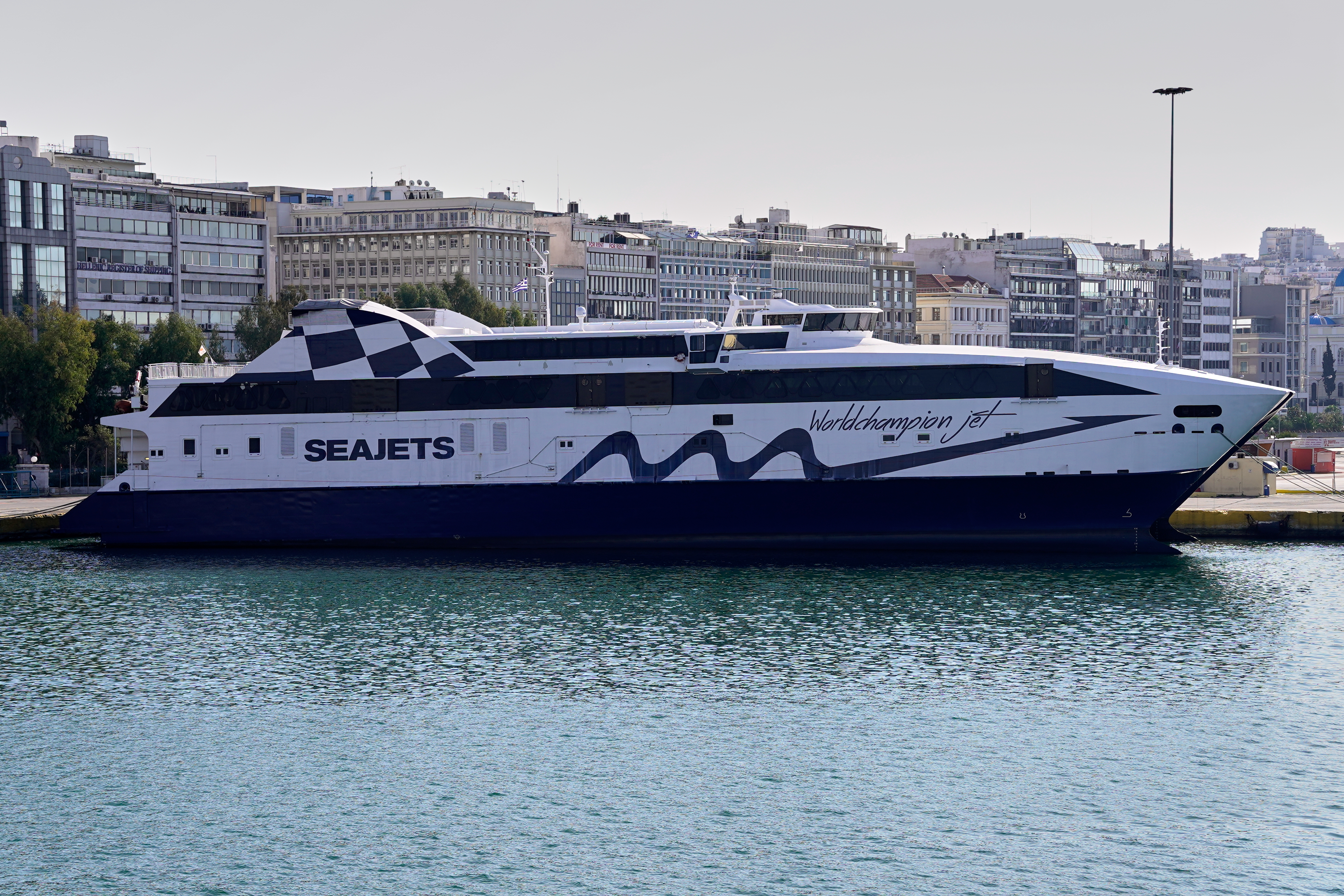
- Worldchampion Jet on February 9, 2020.

History
- Name: 2000–2017: Villum Clausen; 2017–present: Worldchampion Jet
- Owner: 2000–2017: BornholmerFærgen; 2017–present: Seajets
- Port of registry: Cyprus
- Route: Piraeus-Syros-Mykonos-Naxos-Ios-Thira
- Ordered: 1999
- Builder: Austal, Henderson, Western Australia
- Yard number: 96
- Laid down: April 2000
- Launched: February 16, 2001
- Completed: March 2001
- Maiden voyage: 18 May 2001
- In service: 22 June 2001
- Identification: Callsign: OYVY (OYVY2 per 2005); IMO number: 9216250; MMSI number: 219653000
- Status: In service

General characteristics
- Class & type: High-speed craft (HSC)
- Tonnage: 6,402 GT; 1,921 NT
- Displacement: 485 tons
- Length: 84 m (275 ft 7 in)
- Beam: 25 m (82 ft 0 in)
- Depth: 4 m (13 ft 1 in)
- Decks: 4 (2 car decks / 2 passenger decks
- Ramps: 1
- Installed power: Two General Electric LM2500 gas turbines
- Propulsion: Four Rolls-Royce Kamewa 112 SII waterjets
- Speed: 47.7 knots (88.3 km/h; 54.9 mph)
- Capacity: 1,055 passengers; 215 cars
- Crew: 30

Worldchampion Jet (former Villum Clausen) is a fast passenger ferry built in 2000 by Austal, Henderson, Western Australia. Until 31 August 2018, it was in active service between Rønne (Bornholm in Denmark) and Ystad in Sweden. On 19 December 2017, Villum Clausen was sold to the Greek based Ferry Company Seajets. Starting from the summer of 2019, it was renamed WorldChampion Jet and started sailing in Greece, between Piraeus and Cyclades.

Villum Clausen on the route Rønne - Ystad - Rønne

HSC Villum Clausen was named after the 17th century Danish freedom fighter Villum Clausen. In 2000, the ship broke the world record for the longest distance travelled by a commercial passenger vessel in 24 hours.

== Fastest ferry in the world ==
On the way from the shipyard of Austal, Henderson, Western Australia to Rønne, Denmark, the ferry had a top speed of 47.7 knots (88.3 km/h; 54.9 mph) and an average of 43.4 knots (80.4 km/h; 49.9 mph), and on February 16 and 17, 2000 it had reached 1063 sea miles within 24 hours, thereby setting the world record which was then recorded in the Guinness World Records. The record lasted for 13 years until the HSC Francisco broke it in 2013, a 99 metre ferry with a top speed of 58 knots. The HSC Francisco operates between Buenos Aires and Montevideo.

== Gallery ==
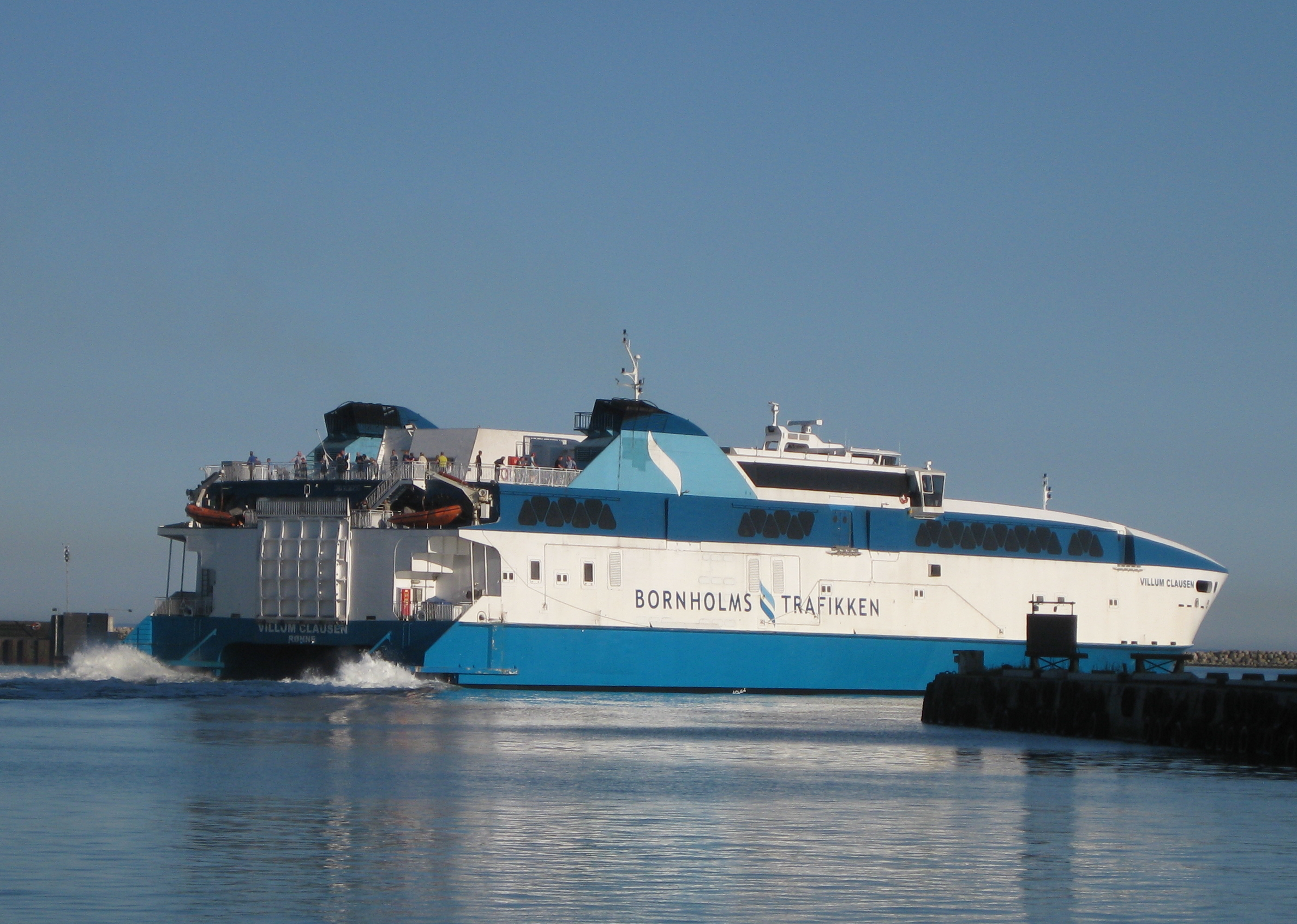
Villum Clausen in Ystad

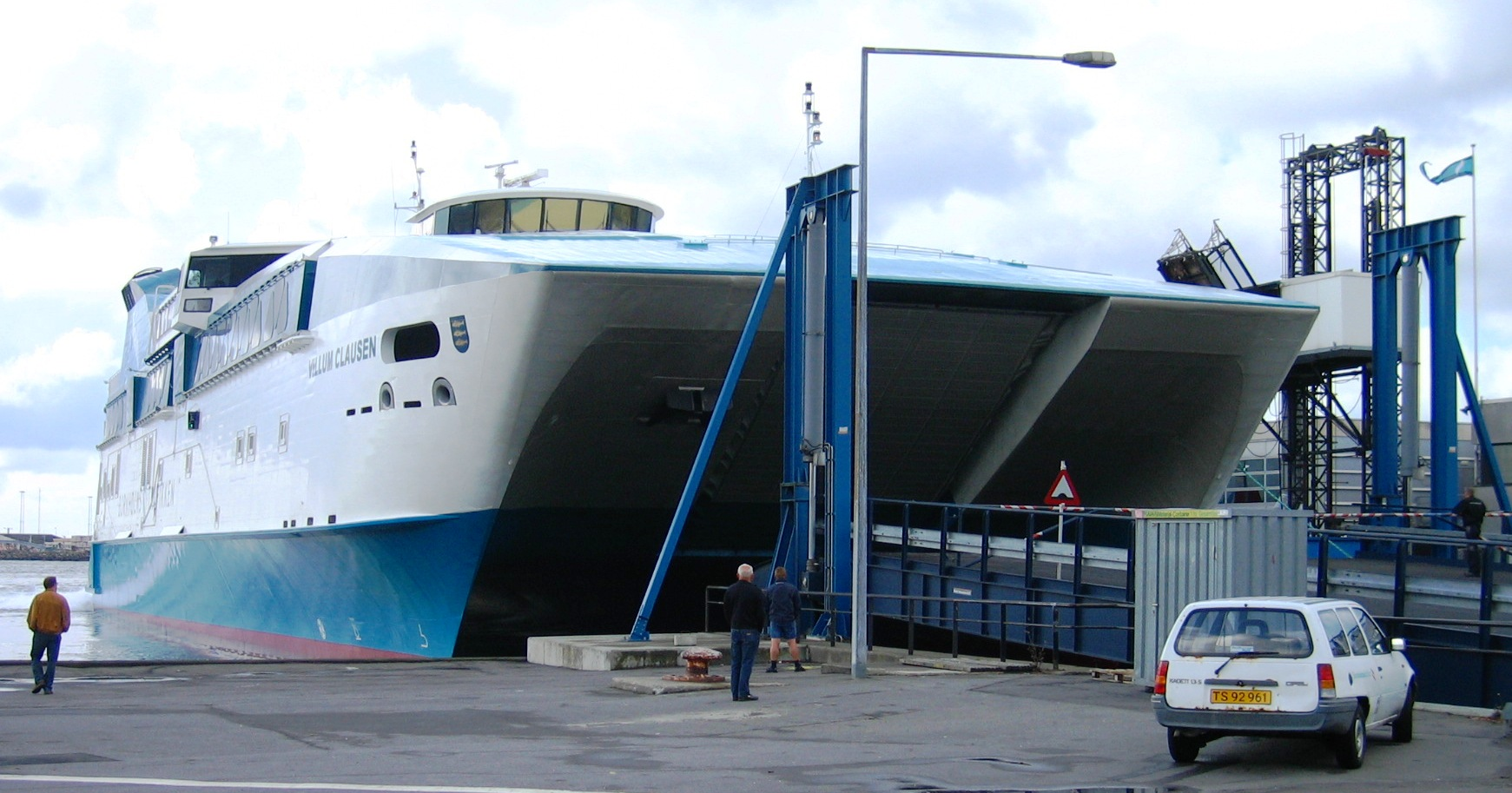
Villum Clausen in Rønne

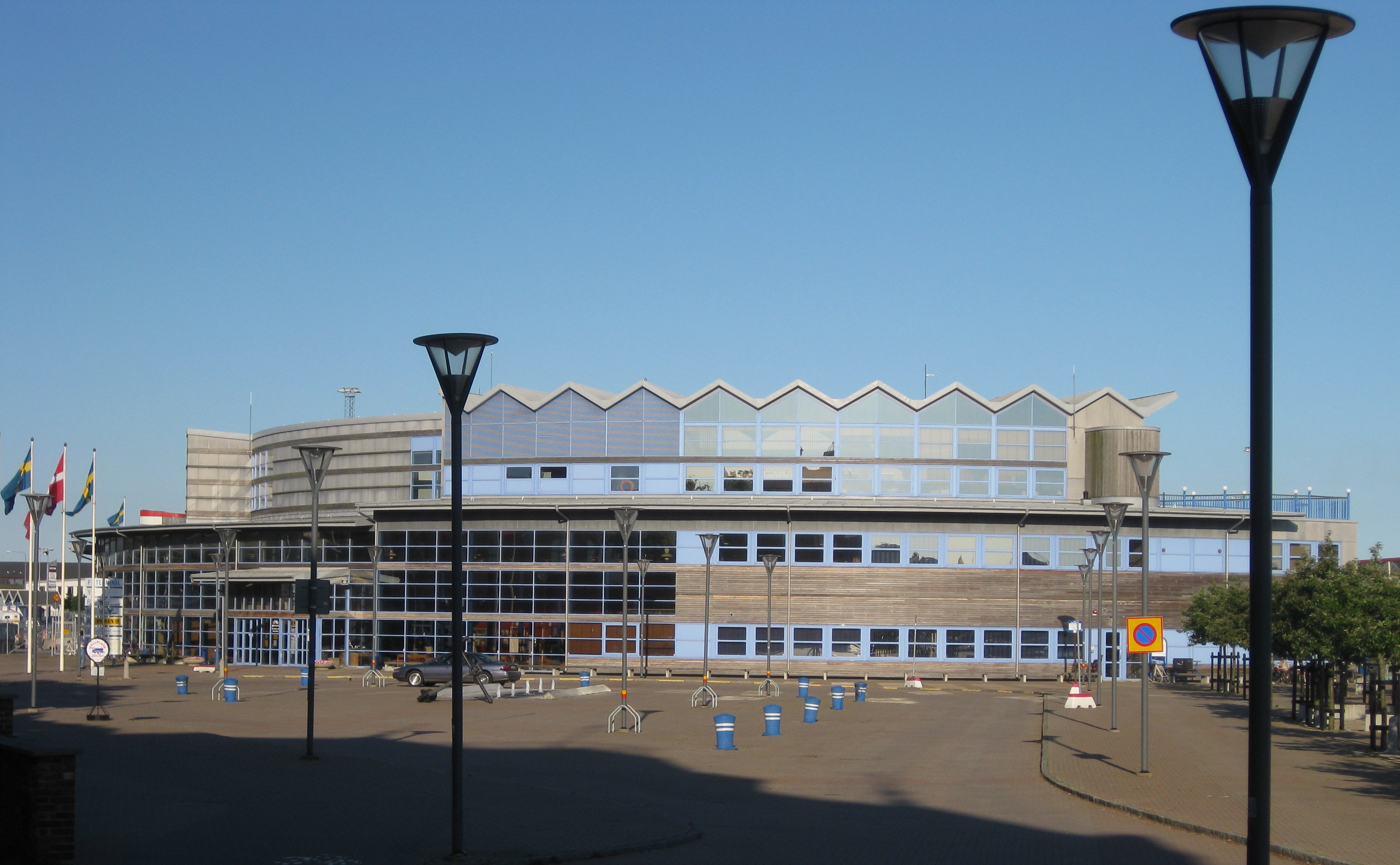
Terminal of BornholmerFærgen in Ystad.

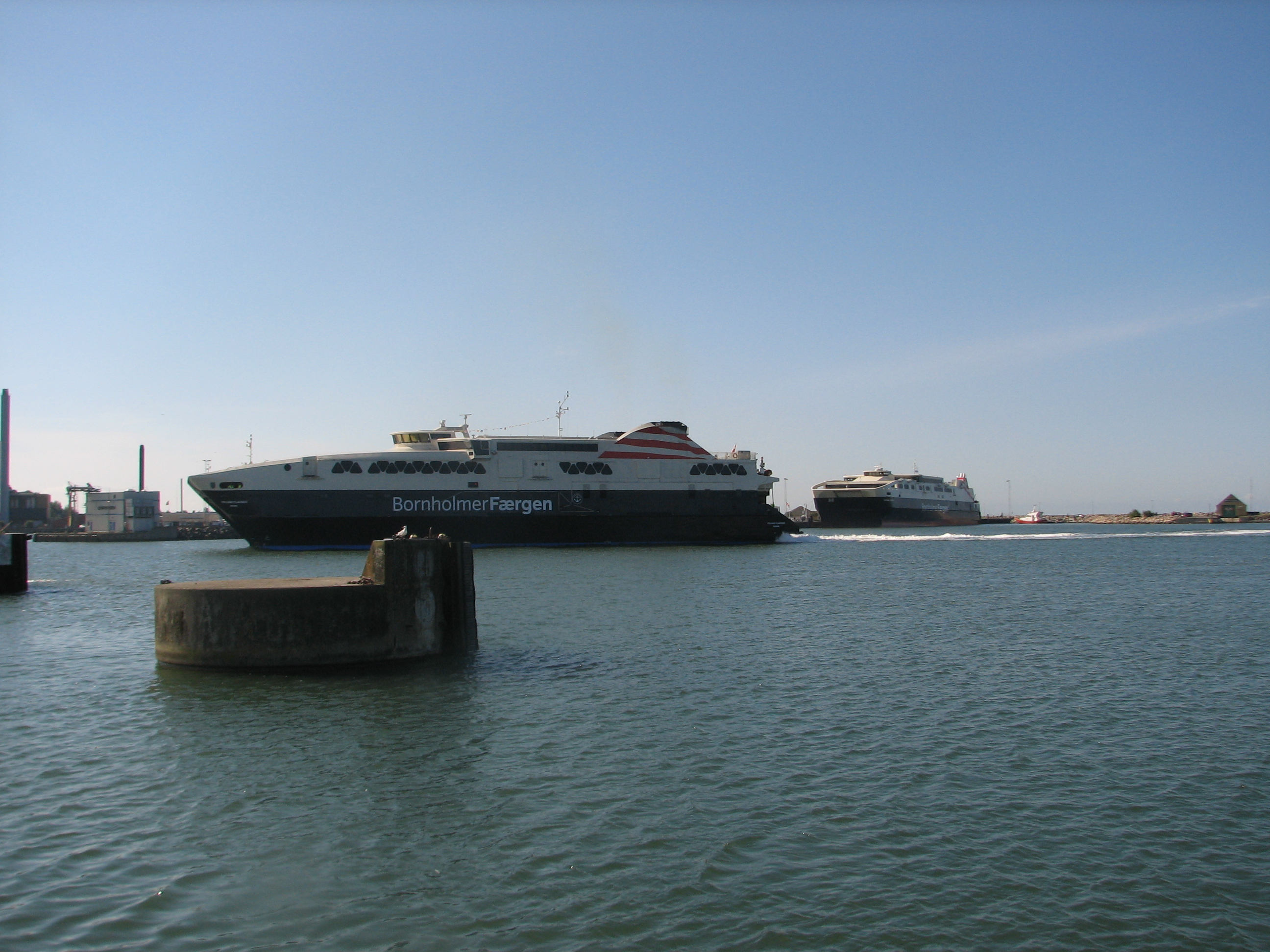
Villum Clausen and Leonora Christina for the first time in the harbour of Rønne.

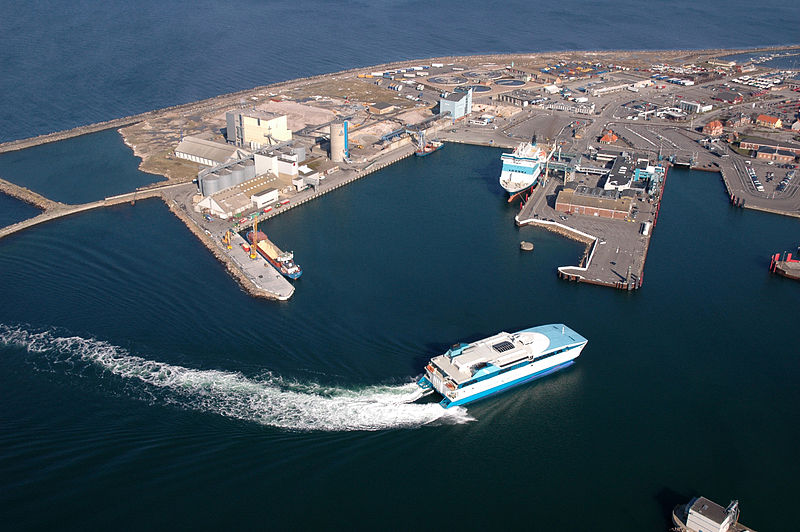
Villum Clausen
Photo: BornholmerFærgen

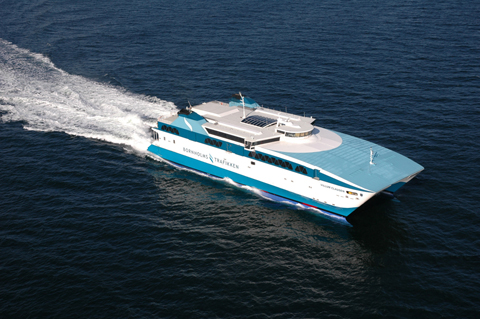
Villum Clausen
Photo: BornholmerFærgen

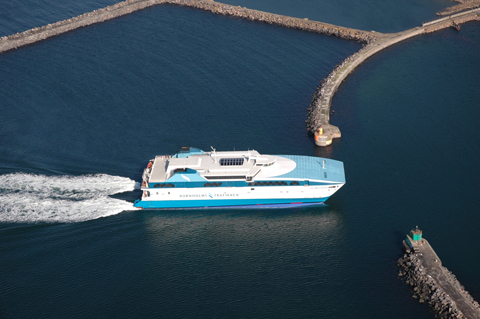
Villum Clausen
Photo: BornholmerFærgen

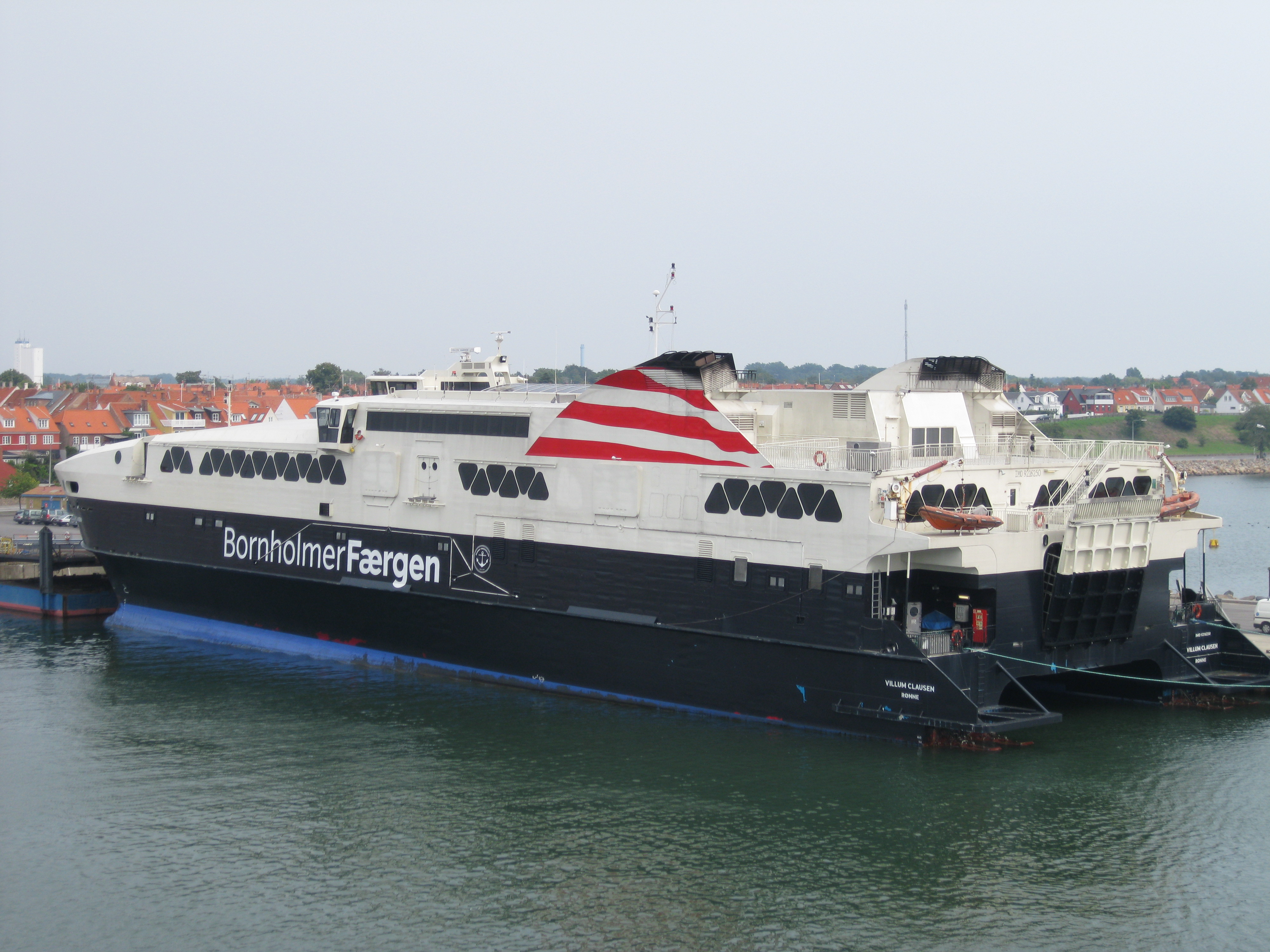
Villum Clausen
