= Buquebus =

Argentine passenger transport company

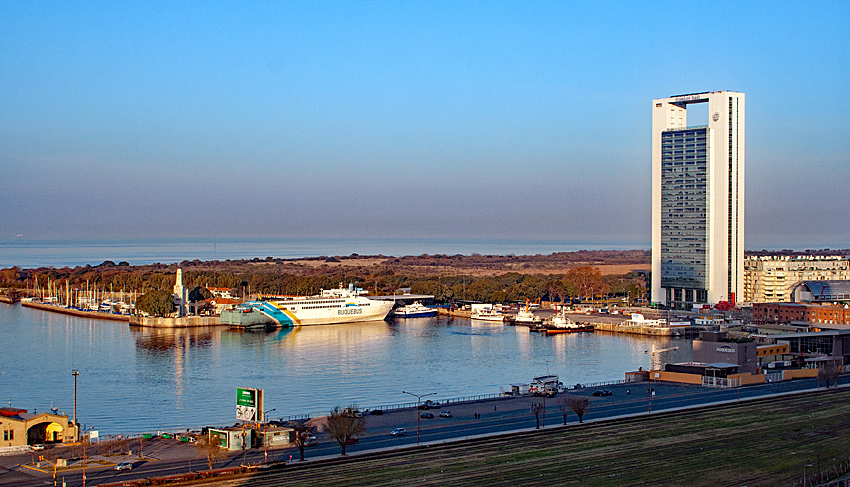
- Buquebus terminal in Buenos Aires, 2011
- Headquarters: Buenos Aires, Argentina
- Area served: River Plate
- Services: Passenger transportation
- Website: www.buquebus.com

Los Cipreses S.A., doing business as Buquebus, is an Argentine company that operates ferry services on the River Plate, from Buenos Aires to Montevideo and Colonia del Sacramento with duty-free shopping. The company operates a number of coach services to various destinations in conjunction with the ferries.

== History ==
The company started in 1979. Some of its first ferries were the Eladia Isabel and Flecha De Buenos Aires between Buenos Aires and Colonia del Sacramento in 1986. In 1998, the company was acquired by Los Cipreses.

Buquebus also operated in Spain, making journeys in the Strait of Gibraltar (between Algeciras and Ceuta), and in the Mediterranean between Mallorca and the Peninsula. It used the catamarans Avemar, Avemar Dos, Catalonia, Ronda Marina, Thomas Edison and Patricia Oliva as well as the monohull Albayzin. On September 19, 2007 this operation was acquired (in 55%) by the shipping company Baleària.

Buquebus also operated the airline BQB Líneas Aéreas in South America from 2010 to 2015.

Since 2014, the company receives 66 tons of LNG per day from 7 production units at its facility in San Vicente near Buenos Aires, sufficient for two round-trips per day for the Francisco ferry on the 146-nautical-mile (270 km; 168 mi) sea route between Buenos Aires and Montevideo. The LNG is sent 60 km in LNG-powered tank trucks to the ship.

The company competes with Colonia Express for a market of 2.5 million people per year who travel across the River Plate. From 2024, Buquebus increased its activities in sport, concerts, gastronomy, wellness, and culture to attract more customers, leading to 50% more river travels and hotel bookings.

As of 2026, the company is building a $350 million 90,000 m^{2} (970,000 sq ft) transportation hub in Puerto Madero in Buenos Aires, with a 150-room hotel and gardens with underground parking for 850 cars.

== Fleet ==
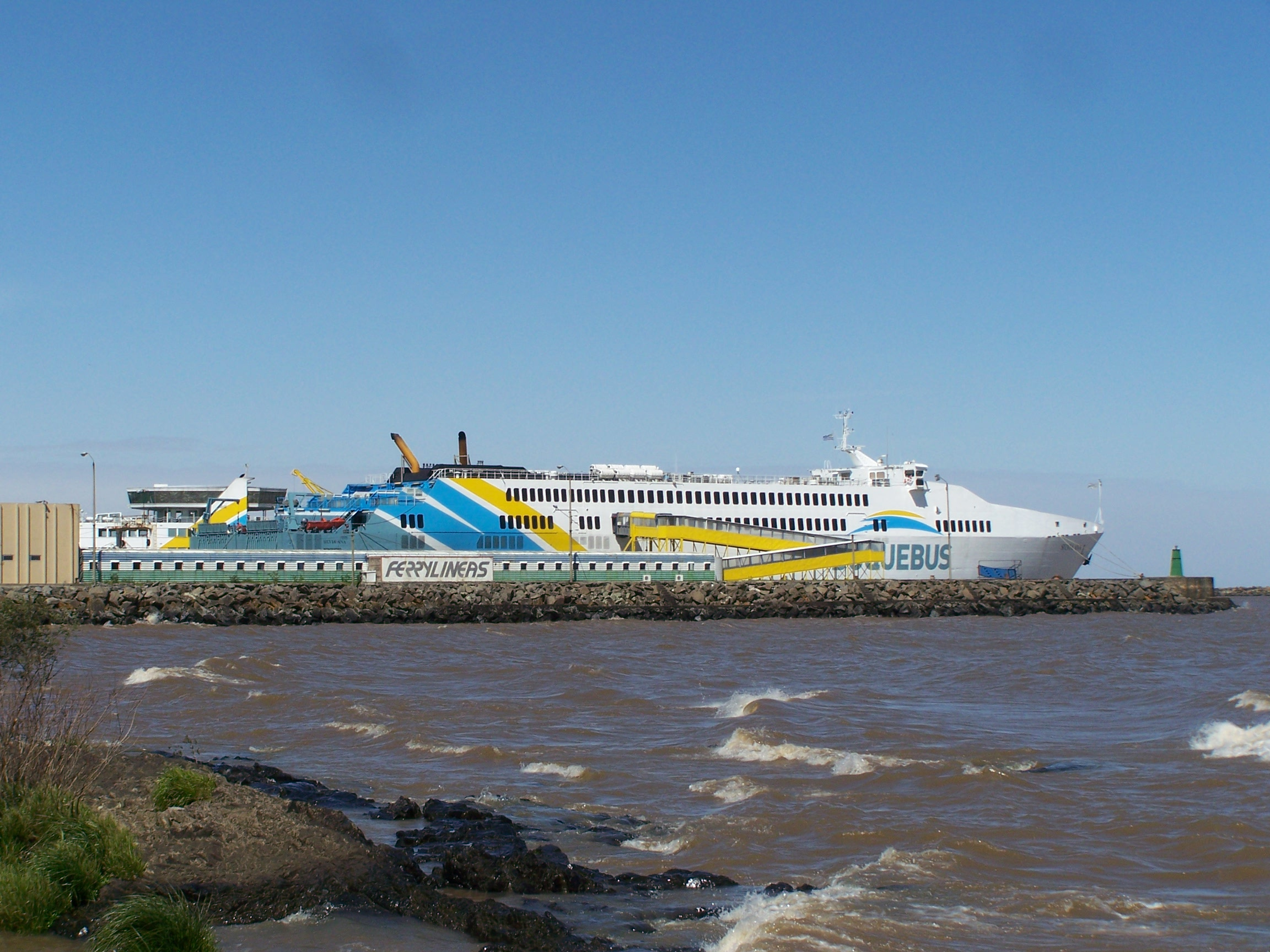
Silvia Ana L

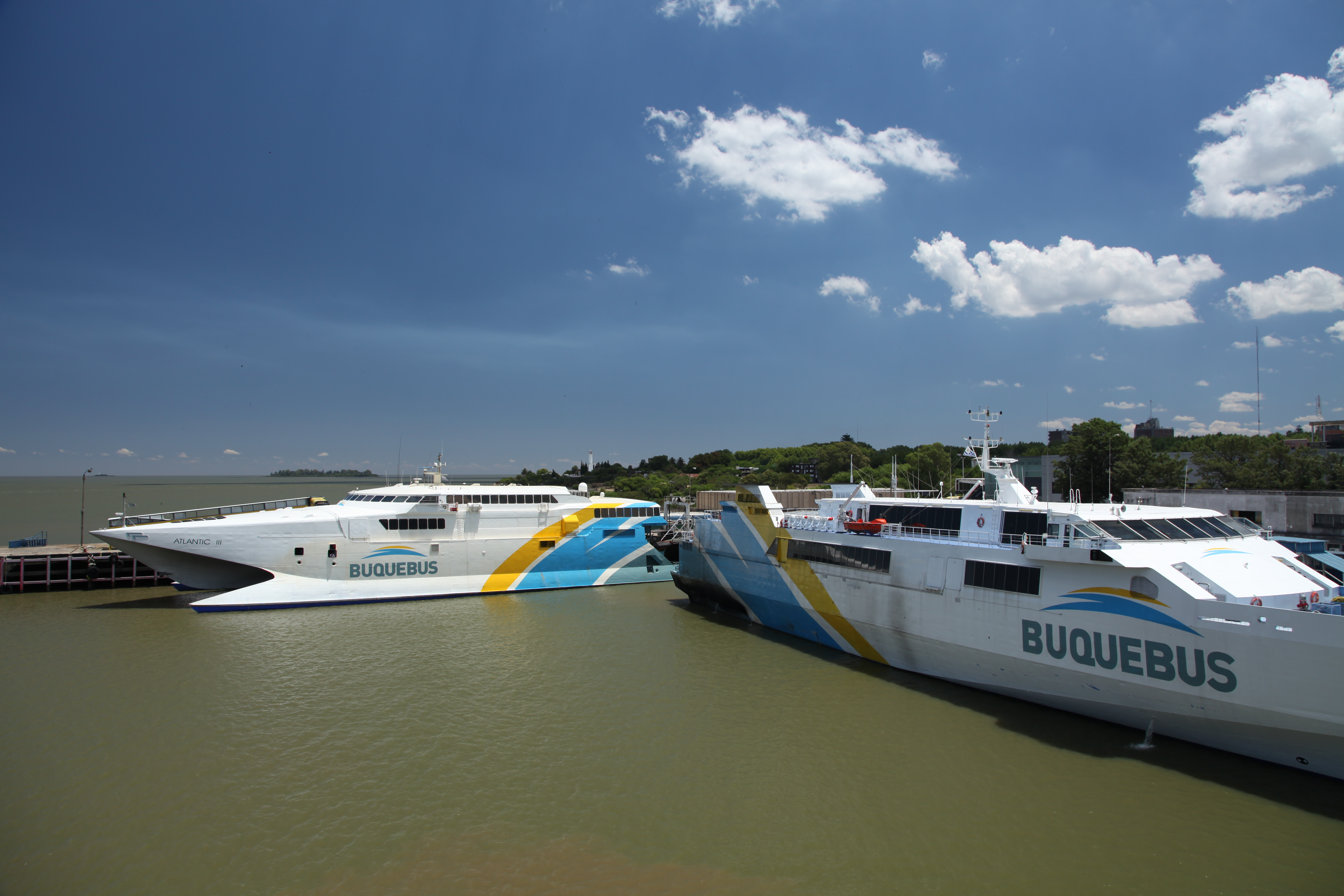
Buquebus vessels in Colonia del Sacramento, Uruguay

Buquebus operates a fleet of three fast ferries.

Ship	Built	Entered service	Route	Speed (knots)	Tonnage	Flag	Notes
Atlantic III	1993	1993	Buenos Aires - Colonia, 30 nmi (56 km; 35 mi)	38	4,994 GT	Uruguay	4×4.5 MW engine
Silvia Ana L	1996	1996 - 2000; 2007 -	Buenos Aires - Colonia/Montevideo	42	7,895 GT	Uruguay	Monohull. 6×6 MW. 1200 pax, 220 cars.
Francisco	2013	2013	Buenos Aires - Montevideo, 146 nmi (270 km; 168 mi)	58	7,109 GT	Uruguay	World's fastest ferry. 2×22 MW gas turbines on LNG
China Zorrilla	2025	2026	Buenos Aires - Colonia, 30 nmi (56 km; 35 mi)	25	13,000 GT	Uruguay	World's largest catamaran & aluminium ship. Fully battery electric. 8×2.4 MW electric motors

The ferry, named Francisco, after Pope Francis, was completed by Incat in 2013. Capable of 107 km/h (58 knots) it was, at time of commissioning, the fastest ferry in the world. It has a capacity of 1,024 passengers and crew and 150 cars.

=== Former fleet ===
Buquebus has formerly operated a fleet of other ferries.

Ship	Built	Service	Route	Tonnage	Flag	Notes
Juan Patricio	1995	1995	Buenos Aires - Montevideo	1,760 GT	Argentina	
Eladia Isabel	1986	1986-2016	Buenos Aires - Colonia	7,799 GT	Uruguay	Scrapped in 2025
HSC Albayzin	1994	1994—2018	Buenos Aires - Colonia	3,265 GT	Uruguay	IMO number: 9059054. Scrapped in Montevideo in 2022
Luciano Federico L	1997	1997-2013	Buenos Aires - Colonia	1,737 GT	Uruguay	Fast
Patricia Olivia	1992	1992-1996	Buenos Aires - Colonia	3,454 GT	Uruguay	Scrapped in 2019
Flecha De Buenos Aires	1986	1996	Buenos Aires - Colonia		Uruguay	
Thomas Edison	1999	1999	Buenos Aires - Colonia		Uruguay	
Patricia Olivia II	1999		Buenos Aires - Colonia	727 GT	Uruguay	Scrapped in Montevideo in 2022

The Buquebus website also lists HSC Catalonia, which has been chartered to P&O Ferries as HSC Express for several years.

Buquebus operated the slower diesel ferries built in Japan, Luciano Federico (Awashio) from 1985, and Silvia Ana (Kochi Mary) from 1993, with service ending around year 2000.

=== Bus service ===
The company's coaches connect with its ferries, hence the company name ("buque"=ferry, bus=coach), providing travel to tourist destinations in the Río de la Plata region. From Montevideo, east to Piriapolis, Punta del Este, La Paloma.

From Colonia del Sacramento, west to Carmelo and Nueva Palmira wine region and river delta.

Previously, the company had bus routes to spas in Termas del Arapey and Termas del Daymán in the Salto region in northwest Uruguay. Also east to the seaside resorts of Atlántida, La Pedrera and Punta del Diablo.

== See also ==
BQB Líneas Aéreas, former Buquebus-owned airline.
