= Albisu =

Albisu could refer to:

- Albisu, Uruguay, a hamlet in Salto Department, Uruguay
- Albisu Theatre, a former opera house located in Havana, Cuba
- Jesús María Albisu (born 1949), Spanish handball player
- Victor Albisu (born 1974/75), American chef and restaurateur
