= China Zorrilla (ship) =

High speed catamaran

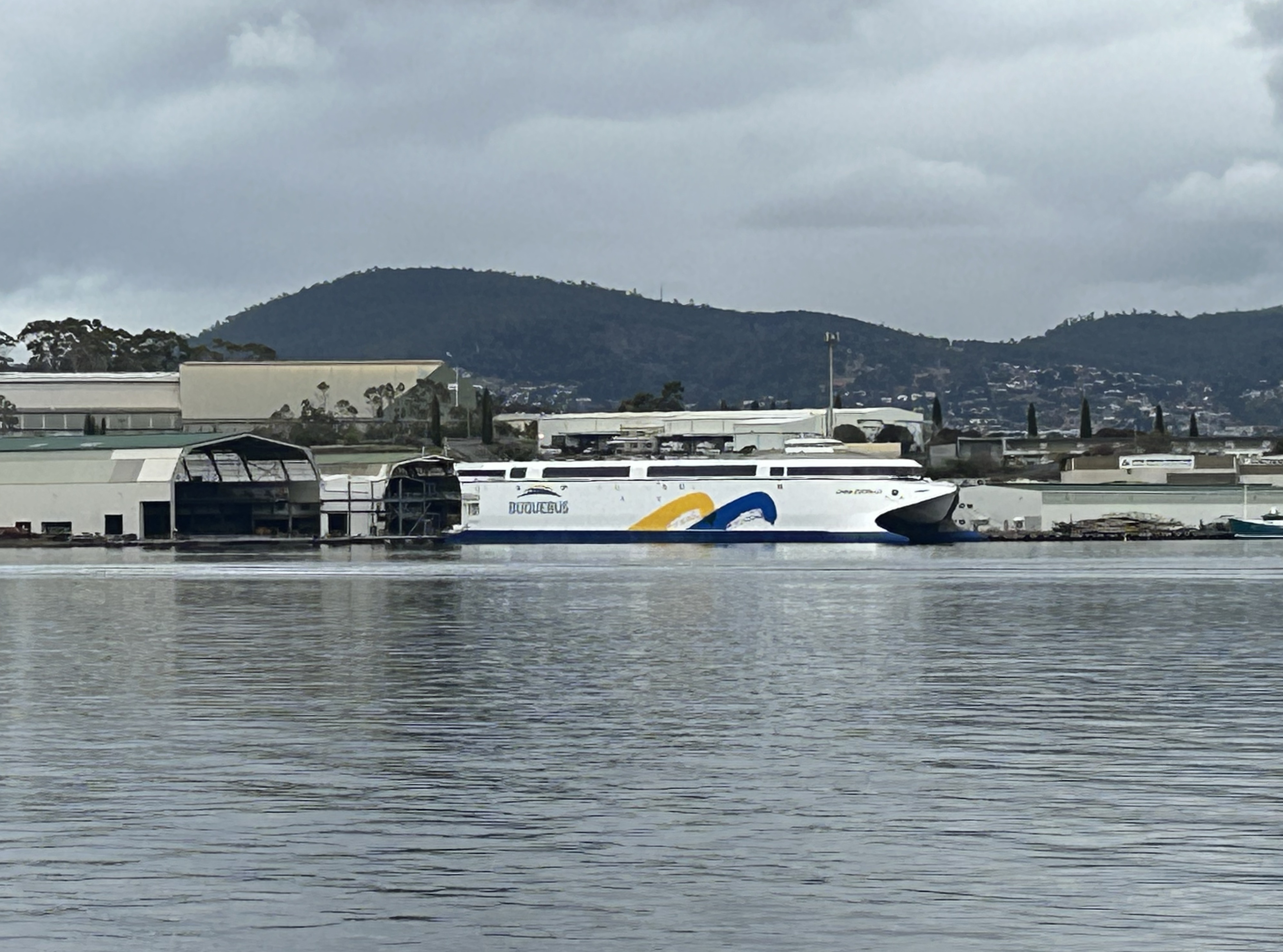
- China Zorrilla at the Incat shipyard in June 2025

History

Uruguay
- Name: China Zorrilla
- Namesake: China Zorrilla
- Owner: 2025–present: Buquebus
- Route: Buenos Aires—Colonia del Sacramento (55-60 km) in 90 minutes
- Builder: Incat, Hobart, Australia
- Cost: $200 million
- Yard number: 096
- Launched: 2 May 2025
- Home port: Colonia del Sacramento, Uruguay
- Identification: IMO number: 9916678
- Status: Operational

General characteristics
- Tonnage: 14,900 GT
- Length: 130 m (430 ft)
- Beam: 32 m (105 ft)
- Propulsion: 40 MWh battery, 8×2.4 MW electric motors driving 8 Wärtsilä WXJ1100 Waterjets
- Speed: 25 kn (46 km/h)
- Capacity: 225 cars and 2,100 passengers

China Zorrilla is a battery electric roll-on/roll-off catamaran ferry, operated by Buquebus across the shallow Río de la Plata connecting Colonia del Sacramento, Uruguay and Buenos Aires, Argentina.

Built in Hobart, Australia by Incat under the provisional name of Hull 096 and launched in May 2025 with a project cost of $200 million, it is the largest fully electric ship, and largest battery electric vehicle of any kind, in the world.

It was named in honor of the Uruguayan grande dame and actress Concepción "China" Zorrilla (1922–2014), who developed her acting career in stage and screen in both Argentina and Uruguay, as a representative of rioplatense culture.

== History ==
Since the 1980s, Buquebus has operated several diesel ferries on its short 30 nmi (56 km; 35 mi) route between Buenos Aires and Colonia del Sacramento.

Incat's existing relationship with Buquebus has involved construction and delivery of 8 other ships. Incat delivered the liquefied natural gas (LNG)-powered gas turbine catamaran high-speed craft ferry HSC Francisco to Buquebus in 2013, replacing the turbine & marine gasoil-powered Luciano Federico L, at their time the fastest turbine RO/RO ferry in the world at around 50 knots.

In May 2019, Buquebus originally commissioned Incat to deliver the world's largest aluminium ship "Hull 096" designed to cruise at the relatively slower speed of 20 kn (37 km/h; 23 mph) to increase duty-free shopping on the 60 km route between Buenos Aires and Colonia del Sacramento. The technology would be four Wärtsilä-31 diesel-type piston engines (at around 400 tonne combined weight), 100 tonne gearboxes, 180 tonnes of cryogenic fuel tanks and 100 tonne fuel. The engines were dual-fuel, fueled mainly with cheaper liquefied natural gas and augmented by diesel or marine gasoil. In order to keep operating weight low, Buquebus would refuel the ferry with LNG daily trucked from its LNG production facility 60 km south of Buenos Aires, as it does with HSC Francisco. By 2020, all-electric propulsion for 096 was technically feasible if Buquebus could get port charging.

However, the COVID-19 pandemic delayed construction, and by April 2021 metal had not been cut, but design work continued, including a change in design system. Construction started in July 2022.

While the ship structure was being built, in January 2023 Buquebus and Incat renegotiated their agreement, and revised the specification to change the ship to lower-weight full battery-electric (60 km at 24 knots), requiring structural changes in the ship such as an extra bulkhead. The main ship structure was complete in June 2024, and Incat moved the ship to the outfit facility. Incat installed around 150 battery units per day.

The $170 million agreement was partly financed with $67 million from International Finance Corporation supporting $107 million from Banco Santander Uruguay in 2024.

=== Float-out, float-on ===
After fitting-out and float-out, the ship was launched at Incat's facility on the River Derwent on 2 May 2025. The ferry began slow-charging the battery in October 2025, powered up the battery, motors and waterjets in December 2025, and began sea trials in the harbour at Incat in January 2026. A speed of 29 knots was reached, with 600 tonnes of cargo onboard.

The ferry is built for small river waves, not big ocean waves, and it was scheduled to ride on a heavy-lift ship for a month for $6 million from Tasmania over the Pacific Ocean to Uruguay in March 2026, however that was postponed as the transport ship got stuck in the Persian Gulf during the 2026 Strait of Hormuz crisis, and heavy lifters are in high demand worldwide. The replacement ship MV Black Marlin was underway from South Africa by early June 2026, refueling via Melbourne in late July. During the days around 1 August 2026, the ferry was floated onto the heavy-lifter a mile west of Tranmere and secured for ocean conditions by welding and lashing. After leaving Tasmania on 5 August, they sailed 15,000 km going north of New Zealand and crossing the Pacific, traversing the Strait of Magellan and the South Atlantic, the carrier reached Rio de la Plata and then into the Uruguay River, ending at the port of Nueva Palmira 10 September. This is one of the few places where water is 20 meters deep, and the carrier again submerged 19 meters. The following Sunday, 13 September, the ferry was floated off from the carrier and towed to its home port in Colonia del Sacramento to begin its commissioning process. On 1 October the ferry made a test trip on its intended route, from Colonia to Buenos Aires.

== Design ==
The aluminium vessel measures 130 metres (430 ft) in length and has 3 decks to carry up to 2,100 passengers and 225 vehicles; significantly bigger than the company's other ships. The lower deck is the car deck. The middle deck is the duty free shop. The upper deck is the seat deck. Two elevators connect the car deck, shopping deck and seat deck, while a wide staircase connect the shopping deck and seat deck. The seat deck has over two thousand seats in three travel classes. As with Francisco, there is no outside area.

Its propulsion system comprises eight 2.4 MW electric waterjets; two fixed and two steerable in each hull. They are powered by a 40 MWh Corvus Energy Dolphin lithium-ion battery system built in Norway, weighing over 250 tonnes. This system, supplied by Finnish company Wärtsilä, features the largest battery installed on a ship, enabling the ferry to operate entirely on electric power. The battery system is arranged in 4 separate insulated rooms and has 12 battery arrays with 418 modules each, for a total of 5,016 battery units. Weight and temperature are critical aspects, so the modules are not rack mounted. Each module has a cooling fan and is contained from affecting other modules. The electric DC system (supplied by Finnish company The Switch) carries power from battery to motors, and tolerates faults while keeping the ship operational. The unusual battery size required a new ship classification.

The ferry has a 2,300 square meter duty-free shopping area, the largest retail space on any ferry globally. The shopping is an important part of the ferry business, and requires lower speed to prolong passengers' spending during the crossing. The lower speed decreases drag significantly and allows lower energy use and thus a smaller battery.

Incat states that the weight of the electric system is lighter than the equivalent diesel engines and associated LNG components, and that ship weight&speed are important for energy consumption - a heavier steel ship would require more power, and thus more energy, and thus a bigger heavier battery. Parts of the route is only 2.5 m (8.2 ft) shallow water, requiring low weight and smaller waterjets.

The ferry has 6 escape chutes leading to 13 life rafts, with a combined capacity of 2,432 people.

== Operation ==
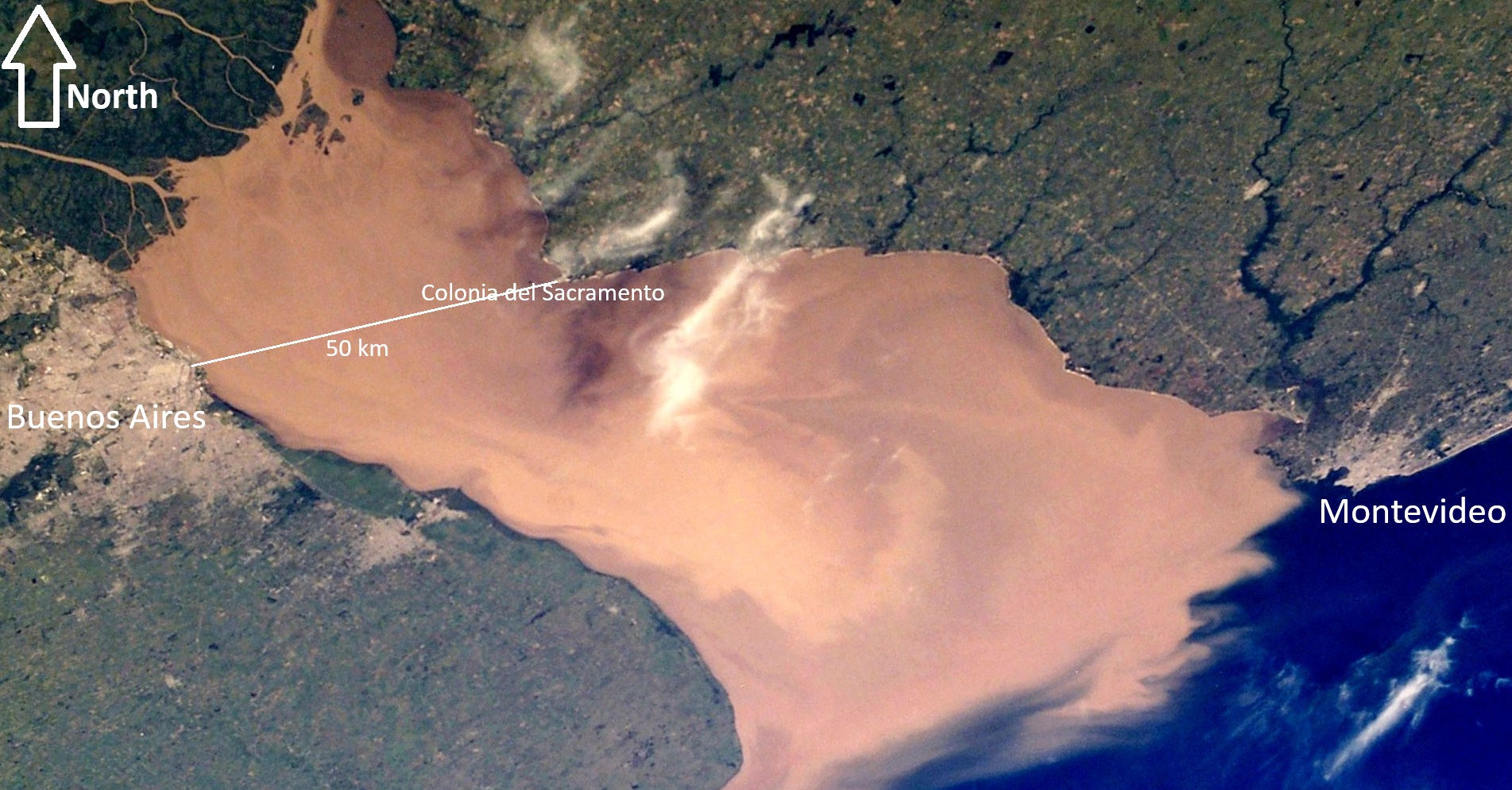
Buquebus ferry route (50-55 km in Rio de la Plata) between Colonia del Sacramento (Uruguay) and Buenos Aires (Argentina).

In Buenos Aires, the company terminal and port is at Dársena Norte harbour, between Retiro railway station, Puerto Madero neighborhood and Costanera Sur Ecological Reserve.

The ferry's travel plan is scheduled for two roundtrips per day, with charging between each of the 4 crossings. The ferry recharges from 20% to 80% state of charge in 80—95 minutes at the company's charge point in each port. Each port has onshore buffer batteries charging from the grid when the ferry is away, releasing power (along with grid power) to the ferry battery when passengers go between ship and shore. The charge point uses 8kA AC / 16kA DC in two 15 MW Wärtsilä chargers for $14 million.

In Uruguay, the high power required a new cable for 20 million dollars, installed by UTE (grid company). The electricity sector in Uruguay has 98% renewable power, while the electricity sector in Argentina has 50% power from natural gas, 25% hydropower, 15% wind&solar, and 10% nuclear power.

Buquebus put China Zorrilla into commercial service after an official launch ceremony in Buenos Aires on 21 October 2026.
