= Belén, Uruguay =

Belén
- Village
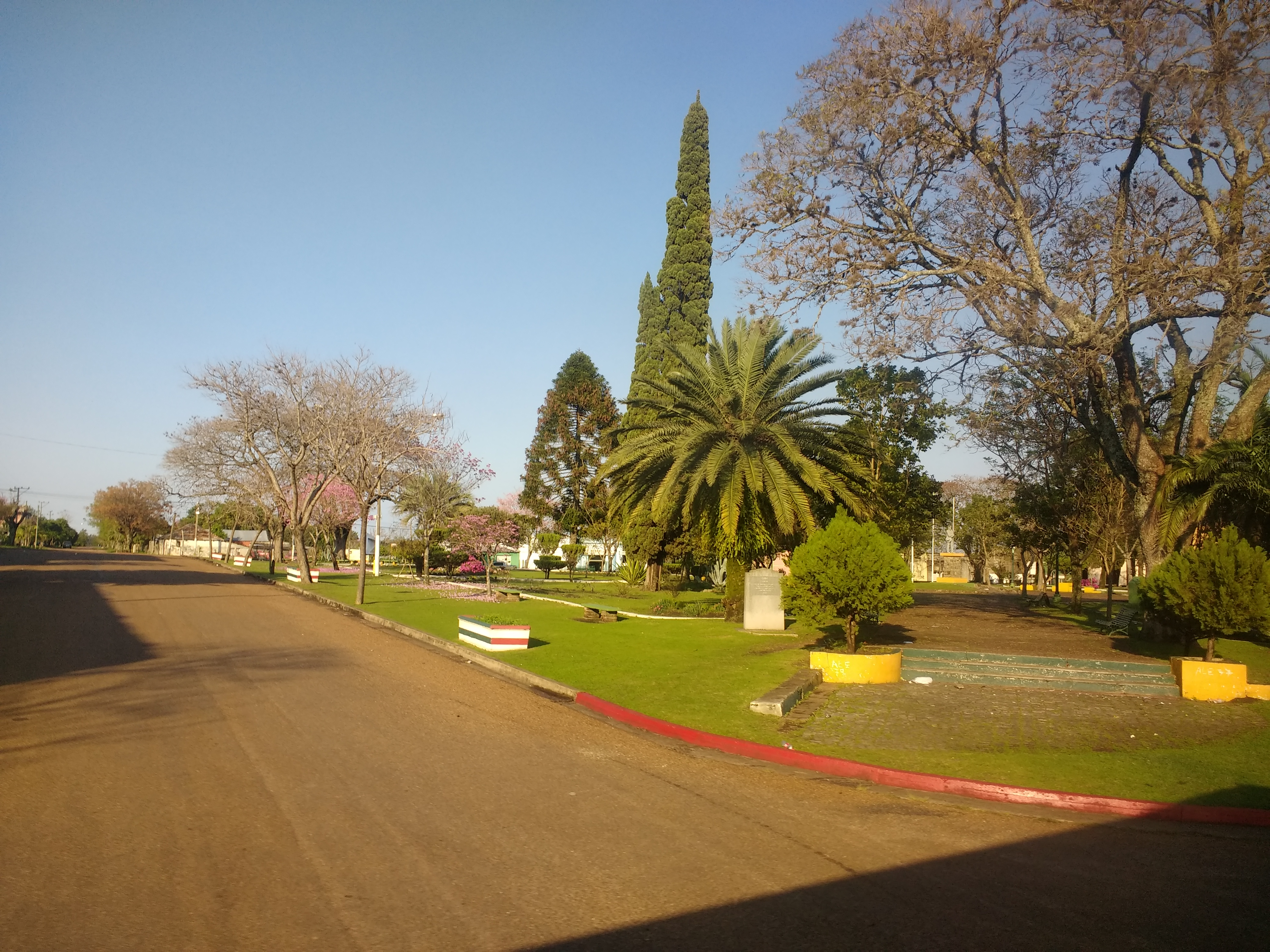

- Location in Uruguay
- Coordinates: 30°47′0″S 57°47′0″W
- Country: Uruguay
- Department: Salto Department

Population (2004)
  - Total: 2,030
- Time zone: UTC -3
- Postal code: 50001
- Dial plan: +598 4766 (+4 digits)

Belén is a village in the Salto Department of northwestern Uruguay.

Belén is also the name of the municipality to which the village belongs.

== Geography ==
The village is located on the mouth of the stream Arroyo Yacuy, on the banks of Uruguay River, northwest of Arapey and north of Salto.

== History ==
It was first established as "Pueblo" (village) on 12 January 1860 and then re-established on 7 May 1862 by the Act of Ley Nº 705 and again on 2 October 1867 by the Act of Ley Nº 896.

== Population ==
In 2011, Belén had a population of 1,926.

Location map of the municipality of Belén

Year	Population
1908	1,994
1963	2,622
1975	2,121
1985	1,882
1996	2,023
2004	2,030
2011	1,926

Source: Instituto Nacional de Estadística de Uruguay
