= Rincón de Valentín =

- Hamlet
- Location in Uruguay
- Coordinates: 31°17′0″S 57°12′0″W
- Country: Uruguay
- Department: Salto Department

Population (2011)
  - Total: 481
- Time zone: UTC -3
- Postal code: 50029
- Dial plan: +598 473 (+5 digits)

Rincón de Valentín is a hamlet (caserío ) in the Salto Department of northwestern Uruguay.

Rincón de Valentín is also the name of the municipality to which the hamlet belongs.

== Geography ==
The hamlet is located on Route 31, about 78 kilometres (48 mi) east-northeast of Salto and 1 kilometre (0.62 mi) west of Arroyo Valentín Grande, a tributary of Río Arapey Grande.

== Population ==
In 2011 Rincón de Valentín had a population of 481.

Location map of the municipality of Rincón de Valentín

Year	Population
1975	74
1985	58
1996	571
2004	688
2011	481

Source: Instituto Nacional de Estadística de Uruguay
