= Garibaldi, Uruguay =

Garibaldi
- hamlet
- Location within Uruguay
- Coordinates: 31°20′20″S 57°49′43″W
- Country: Uruguay
- Department: Salto Department
- Elevation: 60 m (200 ft)

Population (2011)
  - Total: 354
- Time zone: UTC -3
- Dial plan: +598 4730

Garibaldi is a hamlet in the Salto Department of Uruguay, not far from San Antonio.

The town had a population of 354 in 2011.
