= Pueblo Lavalleja =

Pueblo Lavalleja Colonia Lavalleja
- Village
- Location in Uruguay
- Coordinates: 31°5′50″S 57°1′30″W
- Country: Uruguay
- Department: Salto Department

Population (2011)
  - Total: 956 (see text)
- Time zone: UTC -3
- Postal code: 50029
- Dial plan: +598 4768 (+4 digits)

Location map of the municipality of Colonia Lavalleja

Pueblo Lavalleja or Colonia Lavalleja is a village or populated centre in the sparsely populated north part of the Salto Department of northwestern Uruguay. The two populated centres it comprises are called Migliaro and Lluveras.

Colonia Lavalleja is also the name of the municipality to which the village belongs.

== Geography ==
The village is located between the rivers Río Arapey Grande and the Río Arapey Chico, about 7 kilometres (4.3 mi) west of Route 4. About 1.5 kilometres (0.93 mi) west of the village, there is a monument to Juan Antonio Lavalleja.

== History ==
On 5 March 1860, it was recognized as "Pueblo" (village) by the Act of Ley Nº 613.

== Population ==
Up to the census of 2004 Pueblo Lavalleja had a population of 1,049. In the 2011 census, Migliaro (733 inh.) and Lluveras (223 inh.) were counted separately adding to a total of 956 inhabitants.

| Year | Population |
|---|---|
| 1908 | 4,172 |
| 1963 | 188 |
| 1975 | 148 |
| 1985 | 249 |
| 1996 | 713 |
| 2004 | 1,049 |
| 2011 | 956* |

Source: Instituto Nacional de Estadística de Uruguay

== Places of worship ==
- St. Joseph Parish Church (Roman Catholic)
