= Constitución, Uruguay =

Constitución
- Town
- Location in Uruguay
- Coordinates: 31°4′0″S 57°51′0″W
- Country: Uruguay
- Department: Salto Department

Population (2004)
  - Total: 2,844
- Time zone: UTC -3
- Postal code: 50002
- Dial plan: +598 4764 (+4 digits)

Constitución is a small town in the Salto Department of northwestern Uruguay.

Constitución is also the name of the municipality to which the town belongs.

== Geography ==
The town is located 12 kilometres (7.5 mi) west of kilometre 535 of Route 3, about 38 kilometres (24 mi) north of the city of Salto, and on the east bank of the Uruguay River.

== History ==
On 11 July 1852 it was recognized as a "Pueblo" (village) by the Act of Ley Nº 297. On 14 July 1977 its status was elevated to "Villa" (town) by the Act of Ley Nº 14.677.

== Population ==
In 2011 Constitución had a population of 2,762.

Location map of the municipality of Constitución

| Year | Population |
|---|---|
| 1908 | 2,388 |
| 1963 | 2,425 |
| 1975 | 3,671 |
| 1985 | 2,954 |
| 1996 | 2,803 |
| 2004 | 2,844 |
| 2011 | 2,762 |

Source: Instituto Nacional de Estadística de Uruguay
