= Biassini =

- Village
- Location in Uruguay
- Coordinates: 31°15′0″S 57°10′0″W
- Country: Uruguay
- Department: Salto Department

Population (2011)
  - Total: 345
- Time zone: UTC -3
- Postal code: 50013
- Dial plan: +598 4768 (+4 digits)

Biassini is a village in the Salto Department of northwestern Uruguay.

== Geography ==
The village is located on Route 4, 3 kilometres (1.9 mi) north of the junction with Route 31, and about 78 kilometres (48 mi) east of the city of Salto.

== Population ==
In 2011 Biassini had a population of 345.

Year	Population
1963	203
1975	248
1985	283
1996	266
2004	366
2011	345

Source: Instituto Nacional de Estadística de Uruguay
