= Migliaro (disambiguation) =

Migliaro is a frazione of the comune (municipality) of Fiscaglia in the Province of Ferrara in the Italian region Emilia-Romagna.

Migliaro may also refer to:

== Places ==
- Migliaro, Uruguay, part of Pueblo Lavalleja or Colonia Lavalleja, a village in the Salto Department of northwestern Uruguay

== People ==
- Eugene Migliaro Corporon (born 1947), American conductor
- Vincenzo Migliaro (1858–1938), Italian painter born in Naples
