= Colonia 18 de Julio =

- Hamlet
- Location in Uruguay
- Coordinates: 31°21′41″S 57°52′26″W
- Country: Uruguay
- Department: Salto Department

Population (2011)
  - Total: 750
- Time zone: UTC -3
- Postal code: 50000
- Dial plan: +598 473 (+5 digits)

Colonia 18 de Julio is a caserío (hamlet) in the Salto Department of northwestern Uruguay.

== Geography ==
The hamlet is located in the outskirts of the city of Salto.

== Population ==
In 2011 Colonia 18 de Julio had a population of 750.

Year	Population
1996	398
2004	706
2011	750

Source: Instituto Nacional de Estadística de Uruguay
