= Termas del Arapey =

- Village, Resort
- Location in Uruguay
- Coordinates: 30°56′53″S 57°31′17″W
- Country: Uruguay
- Department: Salto Department

Population (2011)
  - Total: 184
- Time zone: UTC -3
- Postal code: 50003
- Dial plan: +598 4768 (+4 digits)

Termas del Arapey (which means Hot Springs of Arapey) is a resort village in the Salto Department of northwestern Uruguay.

== Geography ==
The resort is located on the Río Arapey Grande, a tributary of Río Uruguay, 20 kilometres (12 mi) into a road that splits off Route 3 in an eastward direction, 65 kilometres (40 mi) north-northeast of the department capital city of Salto and right after it crosses the bridge over Río Arapey. Its distance from Montevideo, the capital of Uruguay, is about 578 kilometres (359 mi) (via Route 3).

== Population ==
In 2011 Termas del Arapey had a population of 184 permanent inhabitants.

Year	Population
1975	337
1985	632
1996	543
2004	256
2011	184

Source: Instituto Nacional de Estadística de Uruguay

== Tourism ==
Termas del Arapey, over the edge of the river, is the oldest establishment of spring waters in the country. It is said to be one of the most prominent destinations of the region, containing the Arapey Thermal Resort. Its hot waters, averaging 39°C, are used therapeutically, and the village has numerous facilities with holiday cottages, closed and outdoor swimming pools, surrounded by luscious green gardens. Every Easter, many people from the rest of the country, as well as Argentinians, Brazilians and Paraguayans visit Termas del Arapey for vacation.
