= Luciano Federico L =

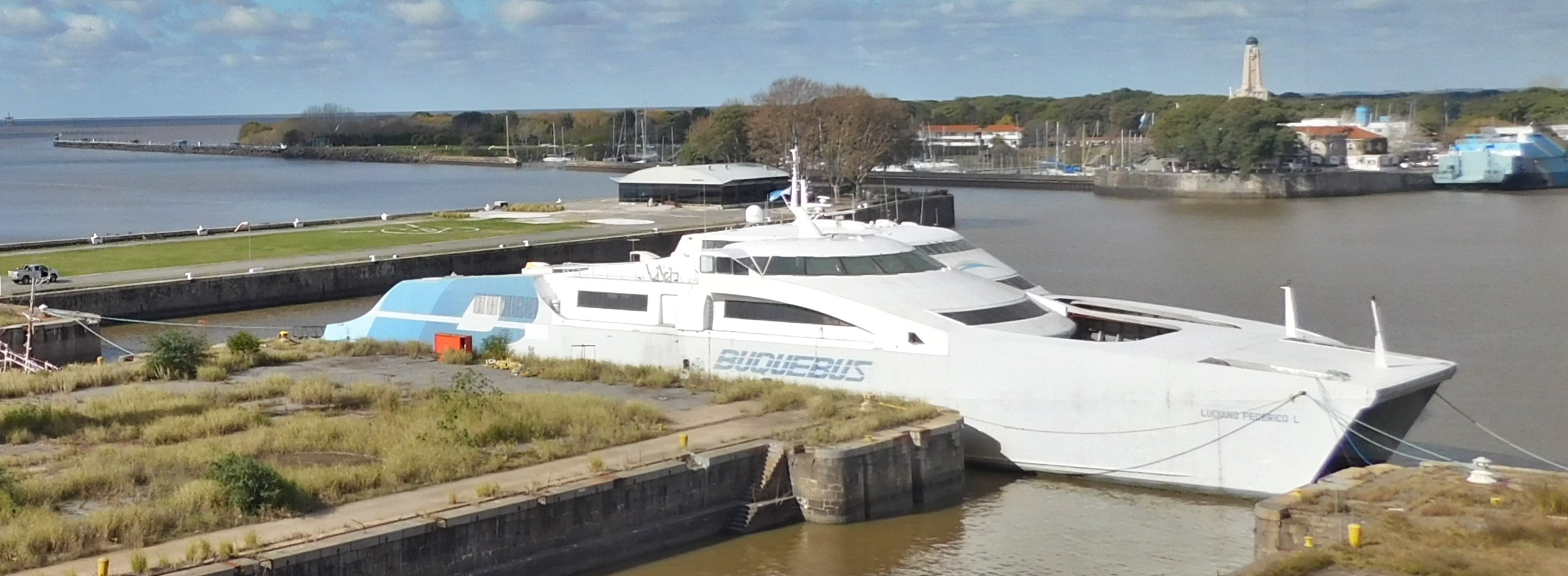
- Luciano Federico L in Darsena Norte in 2016

History

Uruguay
- Name: Luciano Federico L
- Owner: Los Cipreses S.A.
- Operator: Buquebus
- Port of registry: Montevideo
- Builder: Empresa Nacional Bazán
- Yard number: 354
- Laid down: 1 April 1997
- Launched: 4 July 1997
- Acquired: 1 October 1997
- Out of service: 2013
- Identification: IMO number: 9154684; Call sign: CXWL
- Status: Laid up

General characteristics
- Type: Catamaran Car Ferry
- Tonnage: 1,737 GT; 521 NT; 142 DWT
- Length: 77.32 m (253 ft 8 in) o/a; 69.94 m (229 ft 6 in) p/p
- Beam: 19.5 m (64 ft 0 in)
- Draught: 2.15 m (7 ft 1 in)
- Propulsion: 2 × 16.1 MW (21,600 hp) ABB Stal GT35 gas turbines; 2 × Kamewa 112-SII steerable waterjets
- Speed: 58 knots (107 km/h; 67 mph)
- Capacity: 450 passengers and 52 cars

Luciano Federico L was a high-speed B60 catamaran ferry, operated by Buquebus from 1997 to 2013 between Buenos Aires and Montevideo, a distance of 110 nautical miles (200 km; 130 mi).

The ship is based on the Type 1130 catamaran, designed by AMD Marine Consulting of Sydney, Australia, and has an overall hull length of 77.32m, a beam of 19.5m and a full load draught of 2.15m. It has two gas turbines fueled by marine gas oil or diesel fuel marine, and active trim tabs by Vosper Thornycroft. The boat was built in 1997 by the Spanish shipbuilder, Navantia. The ship can carry up to 450 passengers and 52 cars. It has a First Class saloon with 92 seats, Economy Class saloon with 358 seats, and a duty free shop.

The Luciano Federico L holds the Guinness World Record for the fastest car ferry boat in the world with a recorded top speed of 60.3 knots (111.7 km/h; 69.4 mph) during sea trials. In 2013 it was replaced by the LNG-powered HSC Francisco.
