= Arapey Chico River =

Coordinates: 30.953°S 57.5087°W

Location
- Country: Uruguay

Physical characteristics
- Mouth
  - location: Arapey Grande River
- Length: 115 km (71 mi)

The Arapey Chico River is a river of Uruguay.

Dividing Artigas and Salto Departments, it flows into the Arapey Grande River.

== See also ==
- List of rivers of Uruguay
