= Colonia Itapebí =

- hamlet
- Location within Uruguay
- Coordinates: 31°20′18″S 57°24′19″W
- Country: Uruguay
- Department: Salto Department

Population (2011)
  - Total: 460
- Time zone: UTC -3
- Postal code: 50012
- Dial plan: +598 4730 (+4 digits)

Colonia Itapebí is a hamlet in the Salto Department of Uruguay.
