= Albisu, Uruguay =

Albisu
- Hamlet
- Location in Uruguay
- Coordinates: 31°23′4″S 57°48′50″W
- Country: Uruguay
- Department: Salto Department

Population (2011)
  - Total: 544
- Time zone: UTC -3
- Postal code: 50000
- Dial plan: +598 473 (+5 digits)

Albisu is a hamlet (caserío) in the Salto Department of northwestern Uruguay.

== Geography ==
The hamlet is located on the south side of Route 31, about 12 kilometres (7.5 mi) east of the city of Salto.

== Population ==
In 2011 Albisu had a population of 544.

Year	Population
1963	206
1975	137
1985	162
1996	291
2004	464
2011	544

Source: Instituto Nacional de Estadística de Uruguay
