= Museo del Origami =

Origami museum in Uruguay

Museo del Origami is a non-profit institution in the historic district of Colonia del Sacramento, Uruguay, devoted to the art of paper folding, or origami. The museum is part of Uruguay’s National System of Museums and Museographic Collections (Sistema Nacional de Museos y Colecciones Museográficas del Uruguay).

The museum presents both the history of origami and its contemporary uses in areas such as art, science, and design.

It opened in 2020 as a small, independent cultural project in Colonia’s Barrio Histórico, a colonial World Heritage Site by UNESCO.

It is one of only two origami museums in the Western Hemisphere and the only one in the Americas.

== Collection and exhibitions ==
The collection includes works by international artists (Robert J. Lang, Erik Demaine, Akira Yoshizawa, among others), along with historical documentation related to paperfolding and the use of the mathematics of folding in other fields.

Exhibitions range from a permanent section on the history of origami to changing displays that explore current practices and applications.

== Activities ==
In addition to its exhibitions, the museum offers workshops and other public programs intended for a broad audience.

The museum has also been featured in Uruguayan television, including a segment on the program Buen Día broadcast by Canal 4.

== See also ==
- Origami
- List of museums in Uruguay
