= San Antonio, Salto =

San Antonio
- Suburb of Salto
- Location in Uruguay
- Coordinates: 31°21′0″S 57°46′0″W
- Country: Uruguay
- Department: Salto Department

Population (2011)
  - Total: 877
- Time zone: UTC -3
- Postal code: 50009
- Dial plan: +598 473 (+5 digits)

San Antonio is a suburb of capital city Salto of the Salto Department in northwestern Uruguay.

San Antonio is also the name of the municipality to which the suburb belongs.

== Geography ==
The suburb is located 3 kilometres (1.9 mi) north of Route 31, 17 kilometres (11 mi) east of the city and along the railroad track Salto - Artigas. The stream Arroyo San Antonio Grande flows near the suburb.

== Population ==
In 2011 San Antonio had a population of 877.

Location map of the municipality of San Antonio

Year	Population
1963	626
1975	576
1985	527
1996	582
2004	866
2011	877

Source: Instituto Nacional de Estadística de Uruguay
