= HSC Silvia Ana L =

Ship built in 1996

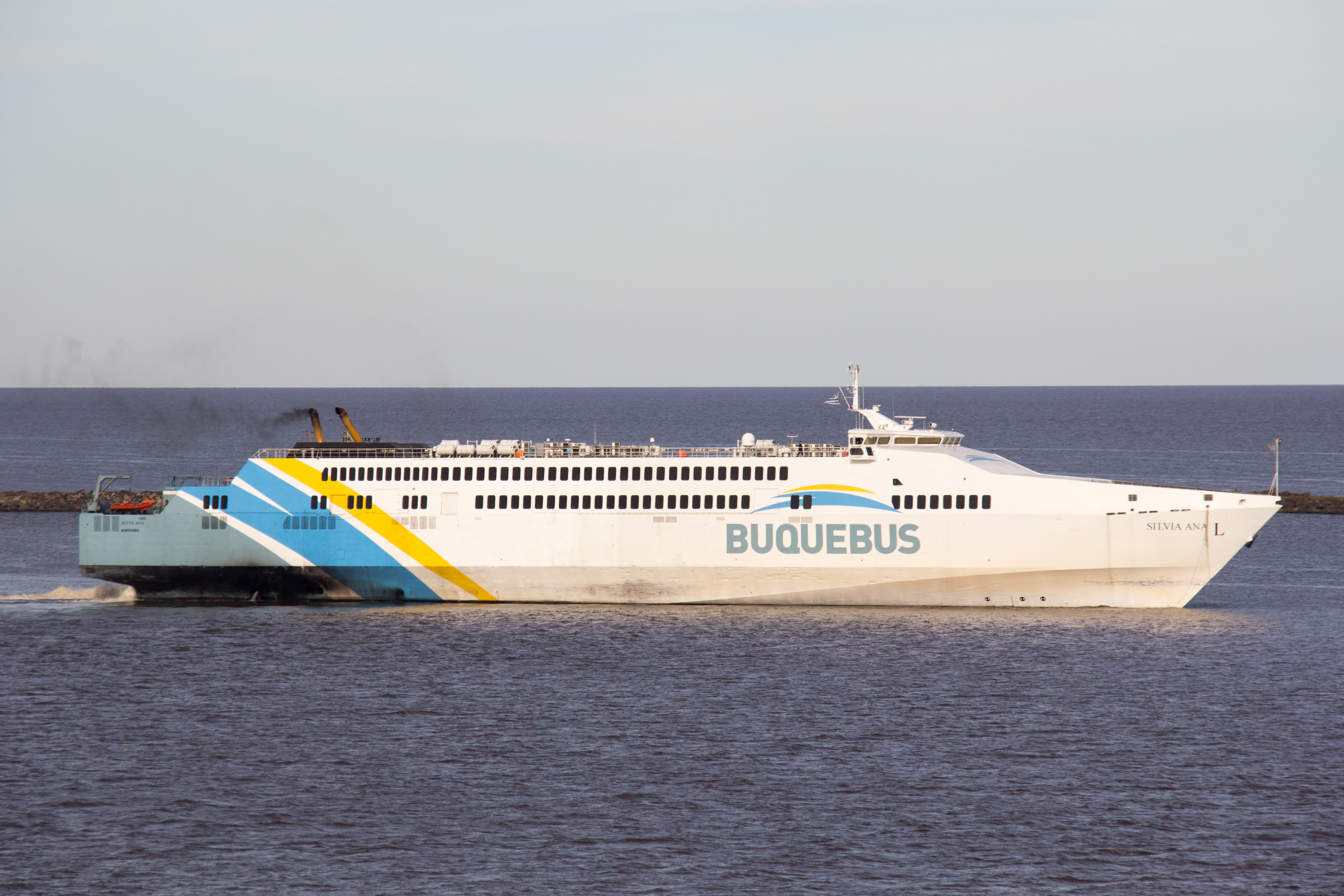
- Silvia Ana L. in Colonia del Sacramento

History
- Name: 1996–present: Silvia Ana L
- Owner: 1996–2001: Los Cipreses SA / Buquebus; 2001–2007: MDFC Aircraft Ltd; 2007–present: Los Cipreses SA / Buquebus
- Operator: 1996–present: Buquebus; Chartered (1997–2007 summers): Color Line
- Port of registry: 1996–present: Montevideo, Uruguay; 1997–2007 (seasonal): Nassau, Bahamas
- Route: Buenos Aires – Colonia / Montevideo; Former: Kristiansand – Hirtshals (Color Line)
- Ordered: 1995
- Builder: E. N. Bazán; San Fernando, Spain
- Yard number: 327
- Laid down: 1995
- Launched: 1996
- Completed: November 1996
- Acquired: 1996
- Maiden voyage: December 1996
- In service: 1996
- Identification: IMO number: 9119385; Call sign: CXQZ; MMSI number: 770576231
- Status: in service
- Notes: World's largest all-aluminium monohull fast ferry when built (Bazan Alhambra class)

General characteristics
- Class & type: Bazán Alhambra-class High-Speed Monohull
- Tonnage: 7,895 GT; 485 DWT
- Length: 125.0 m (410 ft 1 in)
- Beam: 18.70 m (61 ft 4 in)
- Draught: 2.52 m (8 ft 3 in)
- Decks: 3
- Ramps: Bow and stern vehicle loading doors
- Installed power: 6 × Caterpillar 3616TA main diesel engines (total 33,900 kW / 45,460 hp)
- Propulsion: 3 × Rolls-Royce KaMeWa waterjets (2 × 112 SII steerable/reversible outboard + 1 × 140 BII central booster)
- Speed: 38.0 knots (70.4 km/h; 43.7 mph) (service) / 42.0 knots (77.8 km/h; 48.3 mph) (max)
- Capacity: 1,250 passengers (828 Tourist Class / 422 First Class); 238 cars or 4 coaches/11 caravans + 217 cars
- Crew: 25–30

HSC Silvia Ana L (marketed as Silvia Ana) is a high-speed ferry owned and operated by Buquebus on the 60 km route between Buenos Aires (Argentina) and Colonia del Sacramento (Uruguay). She is the largest aluminium one-fuselage high speed ferry in the world.

== History ==
She was built in 1996 by Bazans Fernando Shipyard, Cádiz, Spain for the Uruguay-based Buquebus.

The Silvia Ana L was delivered in December 1996 to Los Cipreses for Buquebus traffic between Buenos Aires, Argentina and Piriapolis, Uruguay. She was originally registered in Montevideo, Uruguay. In March–April 1997 the ship was upgraded in Cádiz, after which her home port was changed to Nassau, Bahamas.

From 1997 onward she was chartered to Color Line between April and September each year in the Northern Hemisphere's summer season, on the Kristiansand—Hirtshals route (Norway to Denmark). For the other half of the year she returned to Buquebus' Buenos Aires—Uruguay services in the Southern Hemisphere's summer season. This arrangement continued until April 2000, when the ship was sold to MDFC Aircraft.

Following the purchase by MDFC Aircraft the Silvia Ana L was again chartered to Color Line, who continued to operate her on the Kristiansand—Hirsthals route. Color bought the ship in 2005. In October 2007 the ship collided with MS Stena Danica in Fredrikshavn harbour while en route to Örskov shipyard, Fredrikshavn.

On 13 November 2007 the Silvia Ana L was sold to Buquebus, and entered service with them on 12 December 2007. On 15 December 2007, the Silvia Ana L began work on the fast speed ferry service from Buenos Aires, to Montevideo and to Colonia del Sacramento.
