= List of museums in Uruguay =

This is a list of museums in Uruguay.

- Museo del Hombre y la Tecnología
- Juan Manuel Blanes Museum
- Museo de la Casa de Luis Alberto de Herrera
- Museum of the Sea (Uruguay)
- Museo Torres García
- National Museum of Natural History, Uruguay
- National Museum of Visual Arts (Uruguay)
- Story of the Andes Survivors Museum
- Museo de Artes Decorativas
- Museo de Arte Precolombino e Indigena
- Museo Paleontologico
- Museo del Origami
- Colonel Jaime Meregalli Aeronautical Museum
- Museo Gurvich

== See also ==
- List of museums in Montevideo
- List of museums by country
