= Termas del Daymán =

- Village, Resort
- Location in Uruguay
- Coordinates: 31°27′10″S 57°54′30″W
- Country: Uruguay
- Department: Salto Department

Population (2011)
  - Total: 356
- Time zone: UTC -3
- Postal code: 50000
- Dial plan: +598 473 (+5 digits)

Termas del Daymán (which means Hot Springs of Daymán) is a resort and populated centre in the Salto Department of northwestern Uruguay.

== Geography ==
The resort is located on Km. 487 of Route 3, 9 kilometres (5.6 mi) southeast of Salto, the capital city of the department. The river Río Daymán flows along the south limits of the resort, with the bridge at Paso de la Piedras linking it with the Paysandú Department.

== Population ==
In 2011 Termas del Daymán had a population of 356 permanent inhabitants.

Year	Population
1963	254
1975	262
1985	348
1996	566
2004	331
2011	356

Source: Instituto Nacional de Estadística de Uruguay
