= Museo del Hombre y la Tecnología =

Museum

Coordinates: 31.385964°S 57.969392°W

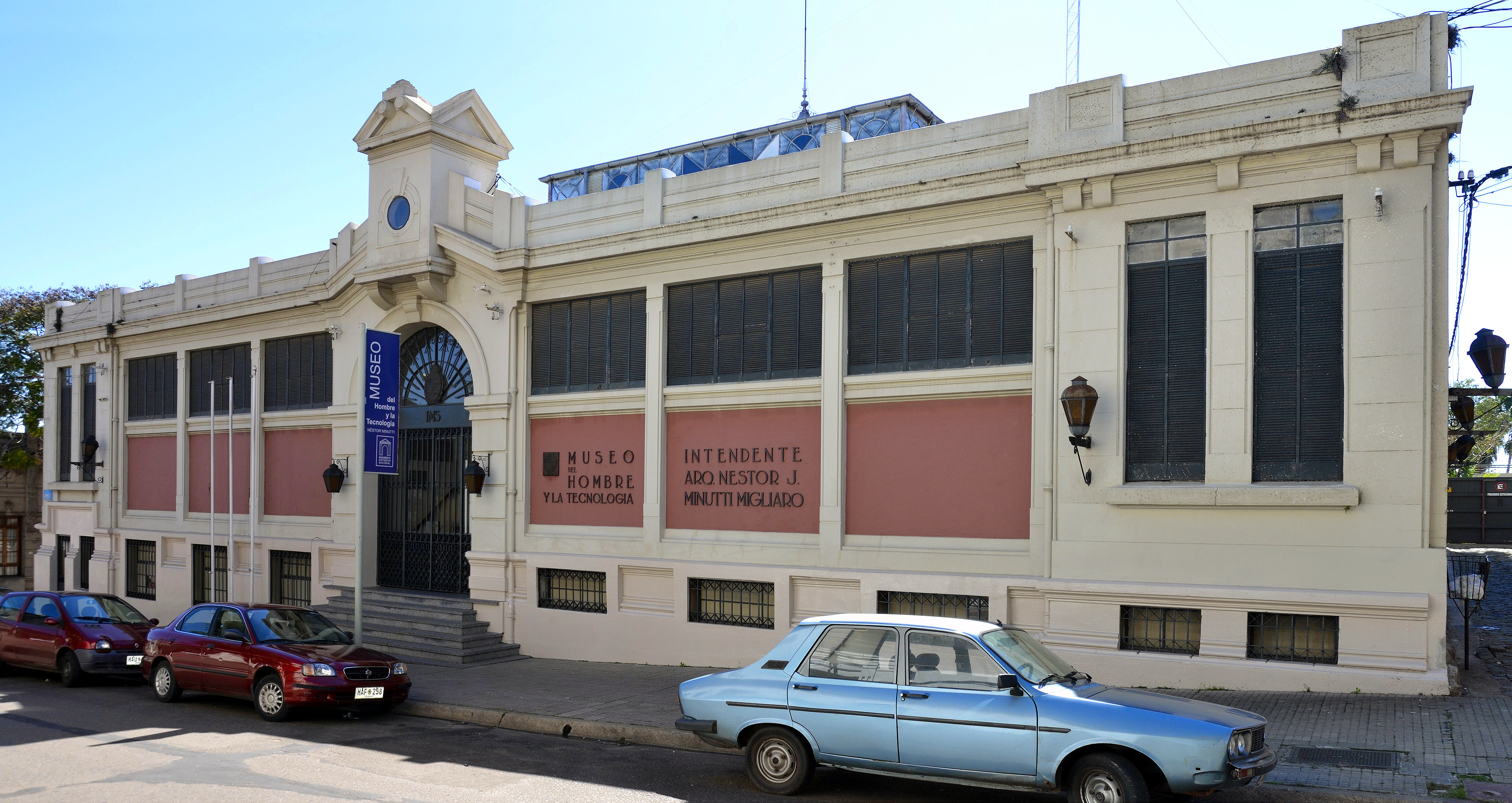
Museum's exterior facade.

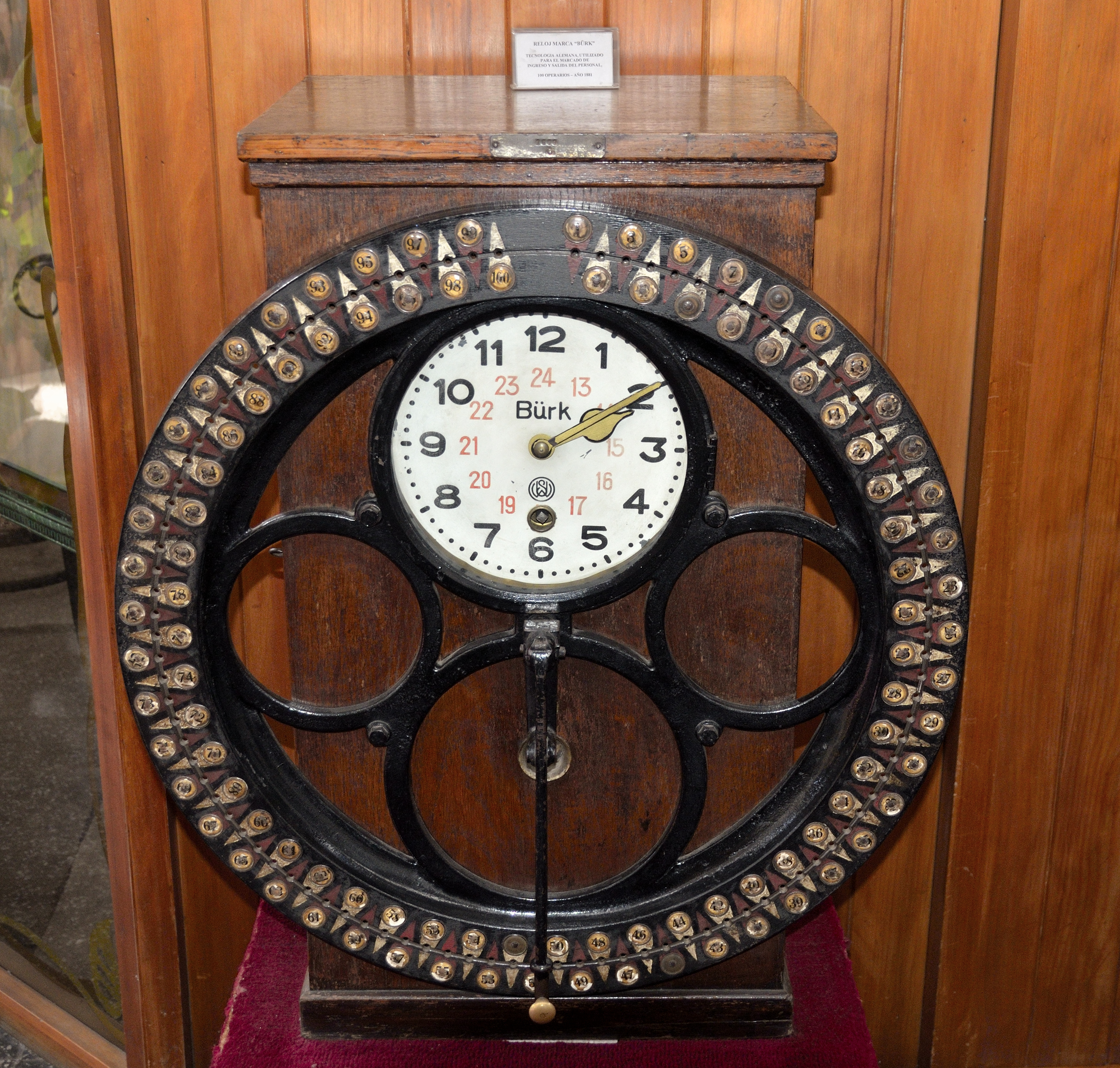
Time clock on display within the museum.

Museo del Hombre y la Tecnología (Museum of Man and Technology) is located in Salto Department, Uruguay. Its exhibitions are devoted to demonstrating how the evolution of technology has influenced the lives of the people of Uruguay and the rest of the world. The museum is housed in the old Central Market in a building constructed built between 1909 and 1915. Its rooms have interactive exhibits dedicated to the evolution of technology in the region. There are eleven rooms and a central area. The museum's director since 2010 is Professor Mario Trindade. The collections include agricultural machinery from the time of colonization, watches, cameras, vintage clothing, and archaeological finds from the past 2,000 years, discovered during the construction of the Salto Grande Dam, among others. A separate room has information about the dam and its operation.

== See also ==
- List of museums in Uruguay
