= Albisu Theatre =

Spanish theatre

- Teatro Albisu
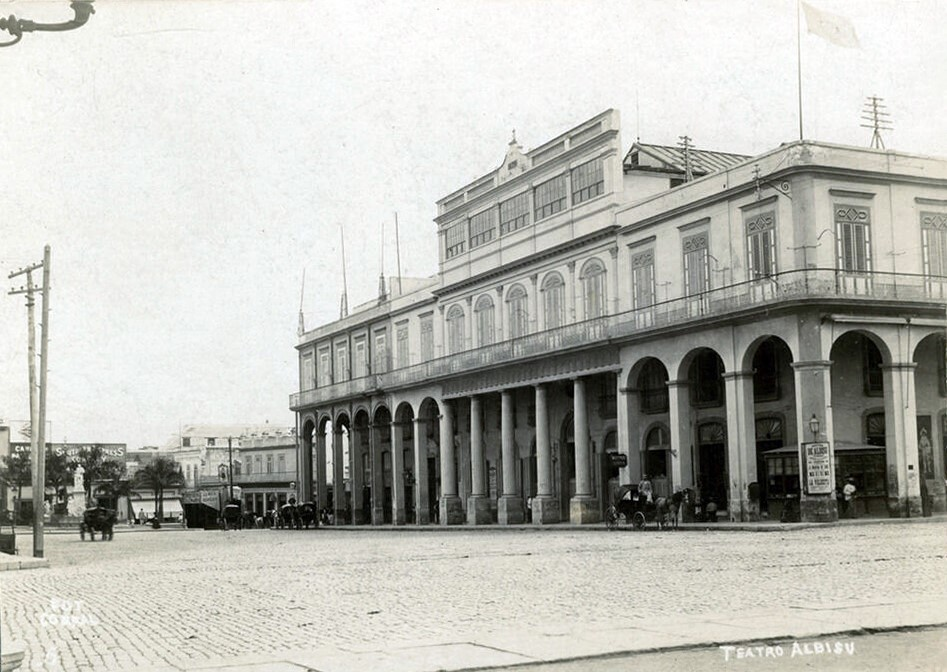
- Interactive map of Albisu Theatre
- Location: Havana, Cuba
- Coordinates: 23°8′13.95″N 82°21′28.05″W

Construction
- Opened: December 17, 1870
- Demolished: 1916

The Albisu Theatre, also known as Teatro Albisu, was a Spanish opera house and one of the main stages in Havana, Cuba.

== History ==
On December 17, 1870, Teatro Albisu opened its doors as a Spanish opera venue. The structure was named after José Albisu, the Spaniard who funded it.

The elegant hall's modest design accommodated 1,600 seats on the lower level and 800 more on the balcony.

In 1882, the theatre had installed an electric lighting system by the Edison Electric Light Company.

The building of Albisu Theatre was purchased for $300,000 by the Asturianos Club of Havana which used the upper part of the edifice as their Centro Asturiano clubhouse. $100,000 was spent on restoring the theatre.

When the original Albisu Theatre building burned down around 1916, it was entirely rebuilt and changed to the Campoamor Theatre.
