= Operating weight =

Operating weight is a measure of the total weight of a vehicle or machine when it is in use, including all necessary components such as the driver or operator, fuel, and any additional equipment or tools required for its operation.

== See also ==
- Operating empty weight - the weight of an aircraft when empty of fuel, crew, and payload
