= La Pedrera, Rocha =

La Pedrera
- Village, resort
- Location in Uruguay
- Coordinates: 34°35′30″S 54°7′30″W
- Country: Uruguay
- Department: Rocha Department

Population (2011)
  - Total: 225
- Time zone: UTC -3
- Postal code: 27004
- Area code: +598 4479
- Climate: Cfb

La Pedrera is a village and resort on the Atlantic Coast in the Rocha Department of Uruguay. It is located on Route 10, about 8 kilometres (5.0 mi) northeast of La Paloma. Although it has a very small permanent population, in summer it is an important coastal resort. La Pedrera is also famous for its proximity to the Valle de la Luna, which extend to Santa Isabel de la Pedrera.

== Population ==
In 2011 La Pedrera had a population of 225 permanent inhabitants and 753 dwellings.

Year	Population	Dwellings
1963	48	98
1975	64	164
1985	65	178
1996	115	329
2004	165	490
2011	225	753

Source: Instituto Nacional de Estadística de Uruguay

== Places of worship ==
- Our Lady of Lourdes Chapel (Roman Catholic)
