= Victor Albisu =

American chef

- Albisu (right) in 2010, making risotto
- Born: 1974 or 1975 (age 51–52); Fairfax, Virginia, U.S.
- Education: George Mason University, Le Cordon Bleu
- Culinary career
- Current restaurant: Taco Bamba (2013 – present)
- Previous restaurants: Del Campo (2013 – 2018); Poca Madre (2018 – 2020)
- Awards won: Chef of the year, Restaurant Association Metropolitan Washington (2015); Semifinalist, James Beard Foundation Award for best chef, Mid-Atlantic region (2016 and 2020)

Victor Albisu (born 1974 or 1975) is an American chef and restaurateur. A graduate of George Mason University in Virginia and Le Cordon Bleu in Paris, he was executive chef at BLT Steak, a steakhouse in Washington, D.C., until 2012 when he left to open his own restaurants. He created the fine-dining Latin American restaurants Del Campo and Poca Madre in Washington, D.C., which have since closed, and the fast-casual chain of taquerias known as Taco Bamba, which features traditional and inventive tacos. Opened in 2013 in the Falls Church, Virginia shopping center where Albisu's mother owns a Latin market, as of June 2024 Taco Bamba has 15 locations in the D.C. area and nearby states. In 2015, the Restaurant Association Metropolitan Washington named Albisu chef of the year, and in 2016 and 2020, he was a semifinalist for the James Beard Foundation Award for best chef in the Mid-Atlantic region.

== Early life and education ==
Albisu was born to a Cuban father and Peruvian mother; his grandfather was a baker in Cuba. Albisu grew up in Falls Church and Annandale, Virginia, and worked at his mother Rosa Susinski's nearby Latin market. He attended Annandale High School, then George Mason University in Virginia, graduating in 1999 with a bachelor's degree in politics and international relations. He later attended Le Cordon Bleu in Paris.

== Career ==
After college, Albisu worked in international development before becoming a chef.

=== Fine dining ===
==== Early career ====
In December 2007, Albisu became chef de cuisine, then later executive chef at BLT Steak, a steakhouse in Washington, D.C. popular with the Obama family. Albisu also cooked at the White House for the Obamas, and previously for George W. Bush. In 2011, he won a competition hosted by Eater in honor of the Obamas' love of burgers, preparing a Kobe beef burger with cheddar, ketchup and wild ramp dijon mustard. Albisu mentioned that the burger contained a few of the favorite foods of Michelle and Barack Obama. The dish was later added to the BLT Steak menu.

==== Del Campo and Poca Madre ====
Albisu left BLT Steak in 2012 to start his own restaurants and in 2013, he opened Del Campo, an upscale South American grill in the Chinatown neighborhood of D.C. Esquire included it in a list of the best new restaurants in the country, with critic John Mariani stating that smoke underpins most of Albisu's "phenomenal cooking" at Del Campo. A review in Condé Nast Traveler said, "D.C. is notoriously plagued by mediocre steakhouses, but this Argentine-style parilla in the Penn Quarter ain't one of them," praising the South American wines, the Peruvian dishes like ceviche, as well as the "toothsome" of roast meats with chimichurri and salsa. In The Washington Post, Tom Sietsema gave the restaurant two-and-a-half stars, indicating good-to-excellent. In 2015, the Restaurant Association Metropolitan Washington named him chef of the year, and in 2016, Albisu was a semifinalist for the James Beard Foundation Award for best chef in the Mid-Atlantic region.

In 2018, Albisu converted Del Campo into an upscale Mexican restaurant called Poca Madre. In 2019, Sietsema listed Poca Madre at number six of the 10 best restaurants in D.C., highlighting "game-changer" dishes centered on vegetables like charred cabbage with mole and oxtail jam, or mango with chile, lime, candied fresno peppers and charred habanero oil in ceviche. In 2020, Albisu was again a semifinalist for the James Beard Foundation Award for best chef, Mid-Atlantic region.

Poca Madre closed on March 16, 2020, when D.C. implemented a dine-in moratorium due to the COVID-19 pandemic; the restaurant did not reopen, closing permanently in September 2020.

=== Taco Bamba ===
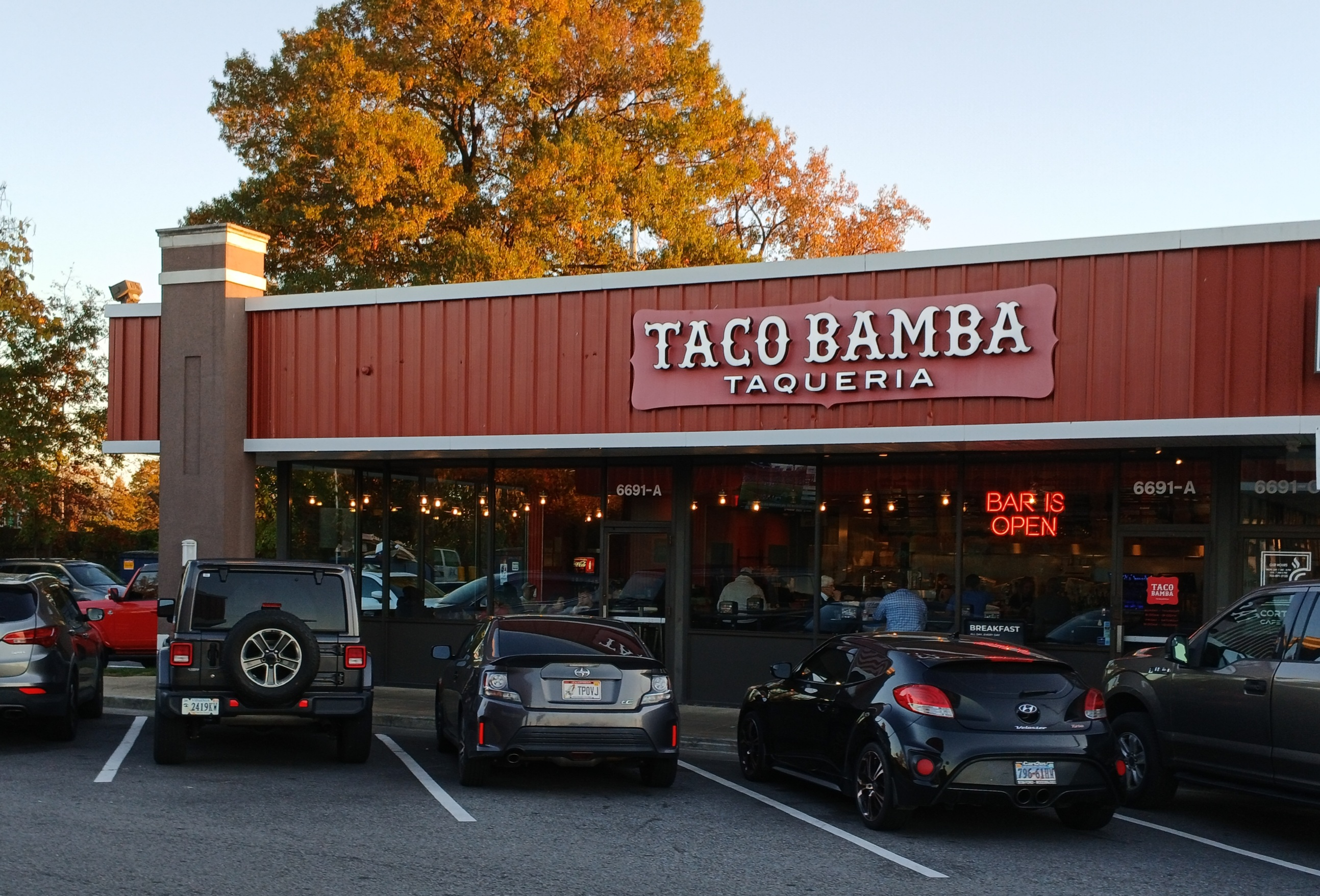
A Taco Bamba location in Springfield, Virginia, in October 2024

In June 2013, Albisu opened Taco Bamba, a fast-casual taqueria in the Falls Church, Virginia shopping center with his mother's market. His mother and stepfather Bill Susinski were cofounders with Albisu. Named for Peruvian slang for "inauthentic", Taco Bamba offered both traditional tacos (carne asada, barbacoa, birria) and more inventive versions, like fried tilapia with squid ink aioli. Esquire called Taco Bamba "some of the best tacos on the East Coast." In September 2016, Albisu opened a second location in Vienna, Virginia. Washingtonian magazine described the Vienna menu as a "love letter to Northern Virginia", with a "7 Corners Shrimp" taco honoring Eden Center's hub of Vietnamese restaurants and "Bulgogi Bullfight" for the Koreatown neighborhood of Annandale, Virginia, Albisu's hometown. However, it also stated that "not all creations deliver", saying that the Black Sheep taco is "all chew", and that the skirt steak and chorizo on the taco "Big Papa Bamba Platter" are "tough and bland".

When the COVID-19 pandemic began in March 2020, Taco Bamba had five locations, with half of revenue coming from dine-in customers. As indoor dining restrictions were imposed, Albisu laid off 100 people and closed the D.C. location, which was adjacent to Poca Madre. He converted the four Virginia locations to takeout-only, then introduced delivery service, which helped keep more staff employed. By the end of April 2020, Albisu said sales had almost returned to pre-pandemic levels though the dining rooms remained empty.

In 2021, Investors Management Corporation, the parent company to the restaurant chain Golden Corral, acquired a stake in the business with the goal of creating a national chain. As of March 2026, Taco Bamba has 16 locations, in the D.C. area as well as Richmond, Virginia, Raleigh, North Carolina, and Nashville, Tennessee. These locations offer "locally inspired" dishes like barbecue pork tacos and pimiento cheese empanadas. A new steakhouse, called Electric Bull, is planned to be opened in the summer of 2025 in Vienna.

=== Other activities ===
Albisu appeared as a competitor in an episode of Beat Bobby Flay, airing in early 2015, winning top honors.

Albisu has worked with the humanitarian organization CARE in Peru and with World Central Kitchen, providing food to those affected by Hurricane Harvey. At World Central Kitchen he was also a member of the board.

== Awards ==
- Semifinalist, James Beard Foundation Award for best chef in the Mid-Atlantic region, 2016 and 2020
- Chef of the year, Restaurant Association Metropolitan Washington, 2015

== Personal life ==
Albisu is married and has two sons.
