= Salto Department =

Department of Uruguay

Salto
- Department
- Flag Coat of arms

- Location of Salto Department in Uruguay
- Coordinates (Salto): 31°23′S 57°57′W
- Country: Uruguay
- Inception: 1837
- Capital of Department: Salto

Government
  - Intendant: Andrés Lima
  - Ruling party: Frente Amplio

Area
  - Total: 14,163 km^{2} (5,468 sq mi)
- Elevation: 88 m (289 ft)

Population (2023 census)
  - Total: 136,197
  - Density: 9.6164/km^{2} (24.906/sq mi)
- Time zone: UTC-3 (UYT)
- ISO 3166 code: UY-SA
- Website: salto.gub.uy

Salto Department (Spanish pronunciation: [ˈsalto]) is a department of the northwestern region of Uruguay. It has an area of about 14,163 km^{2} (5,468 sq mi) and a population of about 136,197. Its capital is the city of Salto. It borders Artigas Department to its north, Paysandú Department to its south, the departments of Rivera and Tacuarembó to its east and has the Río Uruguay flowing at its west, separating it from Argentina.

== History ==
The first division of the Republic in six departments happened on 27 January 1816. Two more departments were formed later in that year. At the time, Paysandú Department included all the territory north of the Río Negro, which included the actual departments of Artigas, Rivera, Tacuarembó, Salto, Paysandú and Río Negro. On 17 June 1837 a new division of Uruguay was made and the department of Salto was created including the actual Artigas Department. Its final borders were defined on 1 October 1884, when the Artigas Department was separated from Salto by the Act of Ley Nº 1854.

== Demographics ==
Ethnic groups in Salto (2023 est.)
Ethnic groups	Percent
White	76.5%
Black	14.5%
Indigenous	7.6%
Asian	0.8%
None/Other/Unspecified	10.0%

At the 2011 census, Salto Department had a population of 124,878 (61,071 male and 63,807 female) and 42,486 households.

Demographic data for Salto Department in 2010:

- Population growth rate: 0.552%
- Birth Rate: 17.32 births/1,000 people
- Death Rate: 8.26 deaths/1,000 people
- Average age: 29.0 (27.6 male, 30.3 female)
- Life Expectancy at Birth:
  - Total population: 75.03 years
  - Male: 72.07 years
  - Female: 78.20 years
- Average per household income: 23,390 pesos/month
- Urban per capita income: 8,409 pesos/month

2010 Data Source:

Main Urban Centres
Other towns and villages
Population given according to the 2011 census.

City / Town	Population
Salto	104,028
Constitución	2,762
Belén	1,926
Colonia Lavalleja (Migliaro+Lluveras)	956 (733+223)
San Antonio	877

Town / Village	Population
Colonia 18 de Julio	750
Albisu	544
Rincón de Valentín	481
Colonia Itapebí	460
Termas del Daymán	356
Garibaldi	354
Biassini	345

Rural population
According to the preliminary results of the 2011 census, Salto department has a rural population of 7,849.

== Map ==
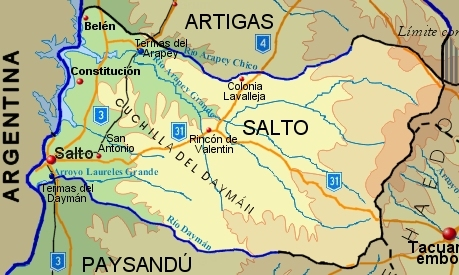
Topographic map of Salto Department showing main populated places and roads

== Government ==
The executive power is exercised by the Intendencia Municipal de Salto. The Intendant is elected every five years with the possibility of reelection.

The following Municipalities have been formed in Salto Department:

- Constitución
- Belén
- Rincón de Valentín
- Colonia Lavalleja
- San Antonio
- Mataojo

== Tourism ==
There are Mineral spas at Termas del Daymán and Termas del Arapey. The displays in Museo del Hombre y la Tecnología demonstrate man's interaction with technology.

== Notable people ==
- Horacio Quiroga (1878-1937) storyteller, playwright and poet. Famous for his work Tales of Love, Madness, and Death. He commit suicide by drinking a glass of cyanide in a Buenos Aires' Hospital by the age of 58 years old.
- Irineo Leguisamo, one of the foremost South American jockeys of the 20th century
- Rafael Addiego Bruno, President of Uruguay in 1985 as an interim measure, born in Salto.
- Edinson Cavani, Football player, The second top goalscorer of Uruguay national football team.
- Luis Suárez, Football player. The top goalscorer of Uruguay national football team.

== See also ==
- List of populated places in Uruguay#Salto Department
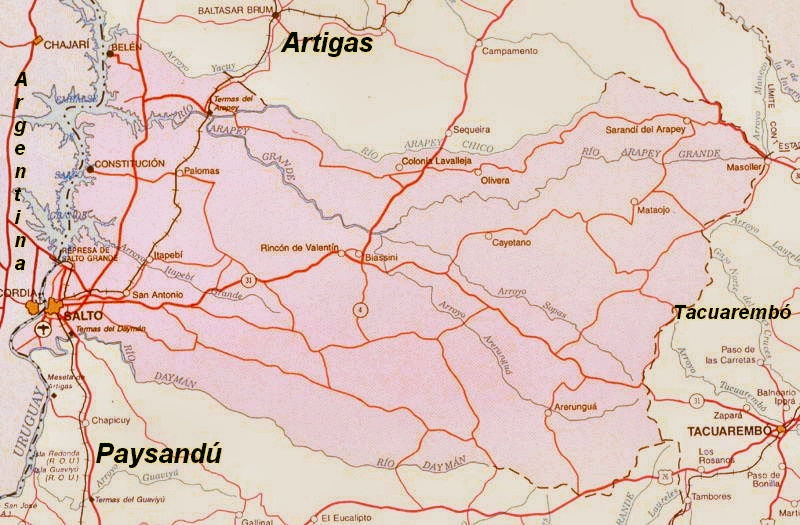
- Detailed map of Salto Department (800x525px)
  showing most populated places and secondary roads.
  See full size version in Commons.
