= HSC Francisco =

High speed catamaran

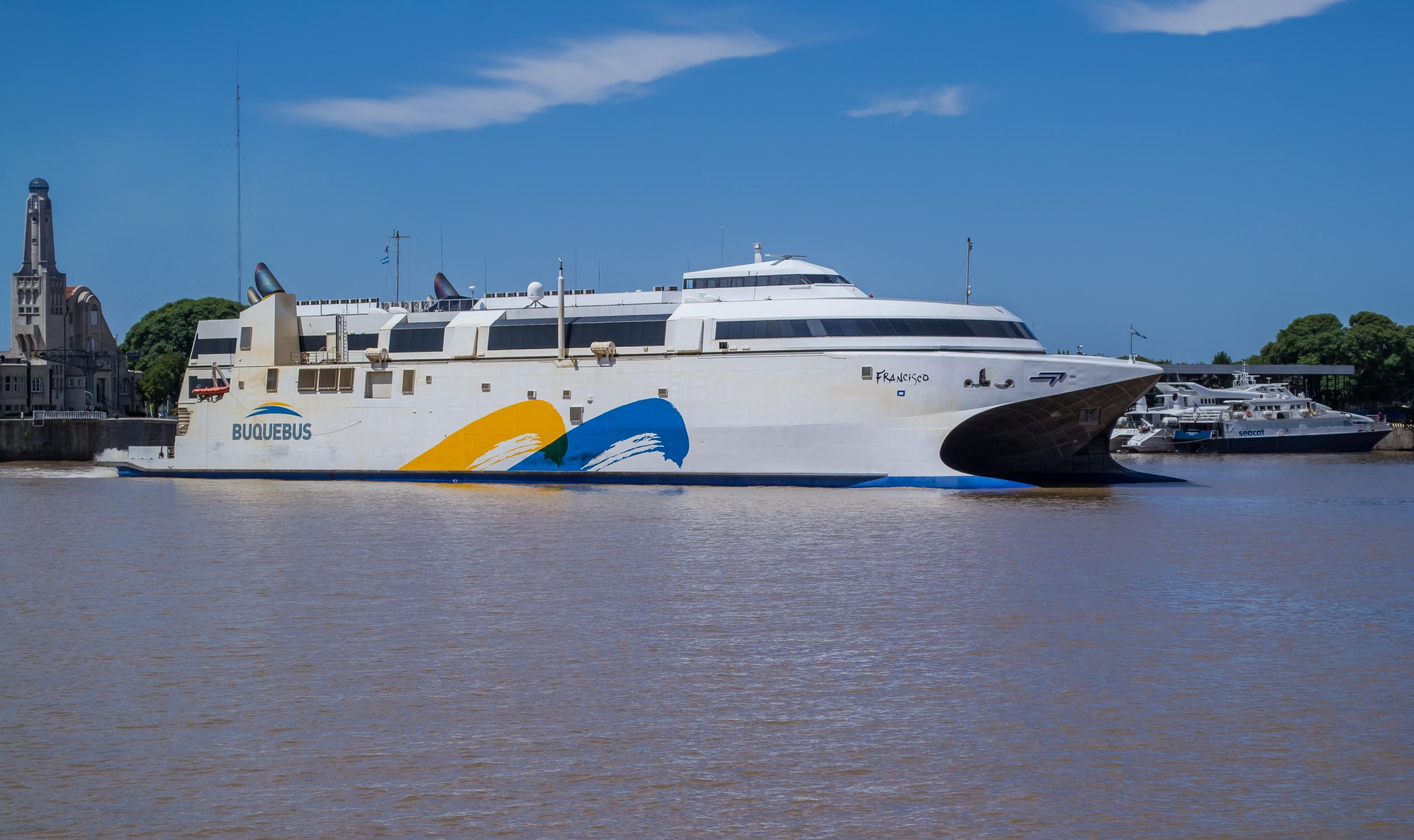
- Francisco in Buenos Aires

History

Uruguay
- Name: Francisco
- Namesake: Pope Francis
- Owner: 2013–present: Buquebus
- Route: Buenos Aires—Montevideo 210 km
- Builder: Incat, Hobart, Australia
- Cost: €110 million
- Yard number: 069
- Launched: 17 November 2012
- In service: 2013
- Home port: Montevideo, Uruguay
- Identification: IMO number: 9610028; MMSI number: 770576272; Callsign: CXOJ
- Status: In service

General characteristics
- Class & type: Wave piercing catamaran 99 m
- Tonnage: 7,109 GT; {{{amt}}} DWT: 450 t
- Displacement: 1,516 tonnes of displacement
- Length: 99 m
- Beam: 26.48 m
- Draught: 3 m
- Ramps: 2 astern
- Installed power: 6 Caterpillar C18 (340 kW diesel generators) for onboard power + 2 Caterpillar C9 (200 kW generators) for main engine services
- Propulsion: 2 sets of General Electric LM2500 rated at 22 MW driving Wärtsilä LJX 1720 SR Waterjet
- Speed: 51.8 knots (59.6 mph; 95.9 km/h) service speed, 58.2 knots (67.0 mph; 107.8 km/h) maximum
- Capacity: 1,025 passengers; 150 cars

Francisco is a high-speed catamaran built by Incat in Hobart, Australia. It is the first large high-speed craft powered by liquefied natural gas (LNG) in the world. The €110 million project was partly financed in 2011 by Australia's Export Finance and Insurance Corporation.

Buquebus ferry route (210 km in Rio de la Plata) between Montevideo (Uruguay) and Buenos Aires (Argentina).

The catamaran is named after Pope Francis and owned and operated by Uruguayan-Argentine ferry company Buquebus. Francisco plies the 210-kilometre (130 mi) route across the Río de la Plata between Buenos Aires and Montevideo, in around two hours and 45 minutes. She is currently the fastest passenger ship in service, with a maximum continuous speed of 51.8 knots (95.9 km/h; 59.6 mph). The combination of gas turbines and LNG was unprecedented and required new methods. While nearly empty, it reached a test speed of 58.2 knots (107.8 km/h; 67.0 mph) at Tasmania in 2013.

It has a capacity of a thousand passengers and 150 cars, served by 24 crew. It has four travel classes and a 1100 m² duty-free shop. Four 340 kW diesel generators provide electricity for the ship's onboard functions.

The silted river caused unexpectedly high wear in the waterjets, and the ship was shiplifted to drydock at Tandanor in 2019.

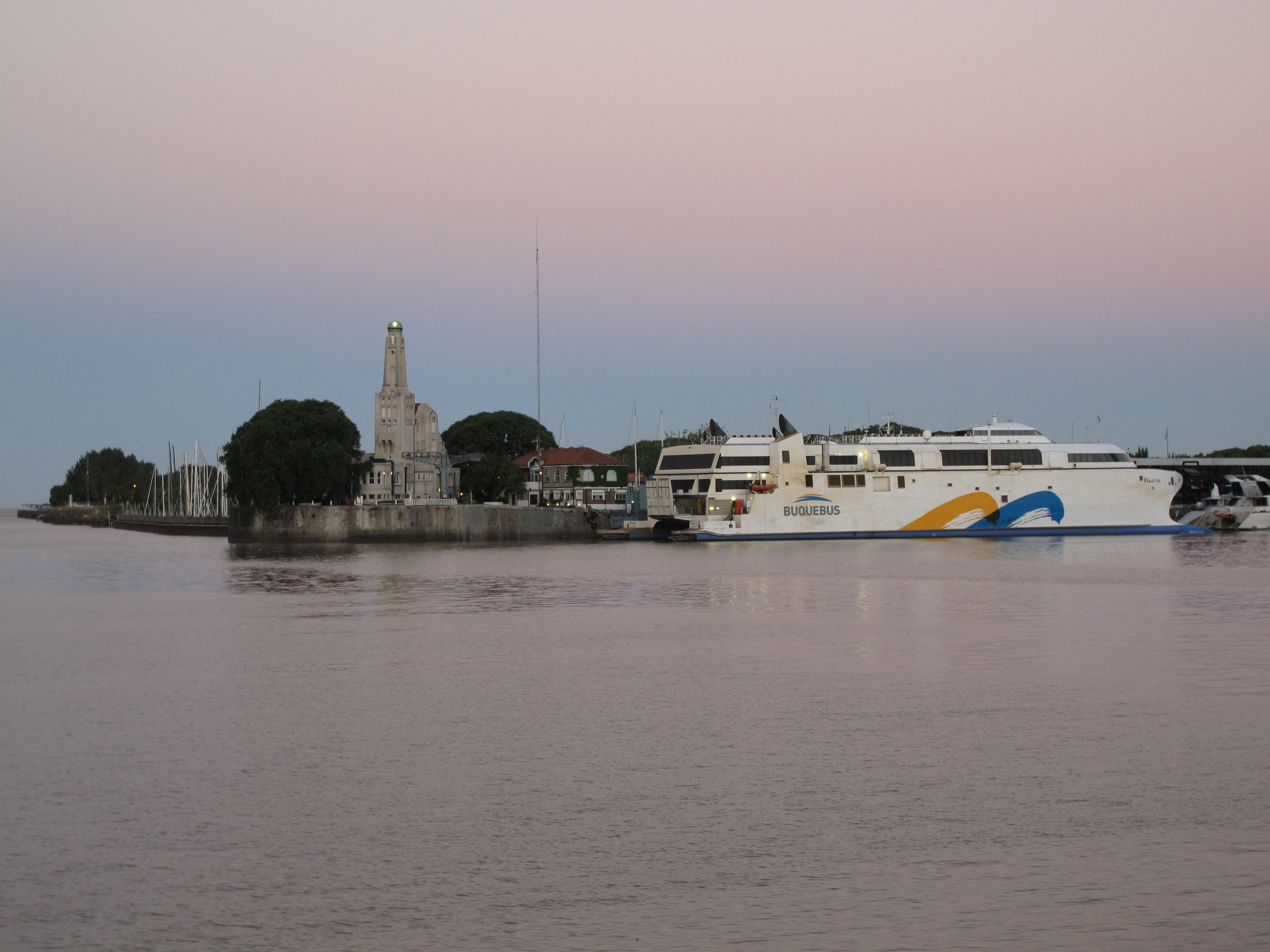
Francisco in Buenos Aires

== LNG operation ==
Since 2014, the company operates its LNG production facility in San Vicente near Buenos Aires. It receives gas from the Vaca Muerta field via the gas network, and produces 66 tons of LNG per day from seven production units (84 ton/day capacity), sufficient for two round-trips per day for the ship.

This facility has a 4.5 MW electricity grid connection, 4 MW electricity generation, and 200 tonne LNG storage. The company sends the LNG in LNG-powered tank trucks 60 km to the ship, where two tankers transfer the LNG to the ship in less than an hour.

Each of the catamaran's two hulls have one 43 m³ cryogenic double-wall stainless steel tank keeping the LNG at -163°C, sufficient for 6 hours of sailing to make the roundtrip to Montevideo and back. Propulsion is by two General Electric LM2500 gas turbines, each coupled with a Wärtsilä water-jet 1.72 meter in diameter, ejecting 24 tons of water per second. Each of the two turbines are started with a 200 kW engine–generator. The turbines burn marine gasoil for a few minutes, and automatically switch to LNG when the turbine exhaust is hot enough to vaporize the LNG through heat exchangers. Port manoeuvering is also handled on gasoil. Gas pressure entering the turbines is 28 bar minimum.

== See also ==
- List of places and things named after Pope Francis

== Notes ==
note1: The road alternative is 577 km in 7.5 hours via Libertador General San Martín Bridge.
