= Arapey Grande River =

Coordinates: 30.9297°S 57.7833°W

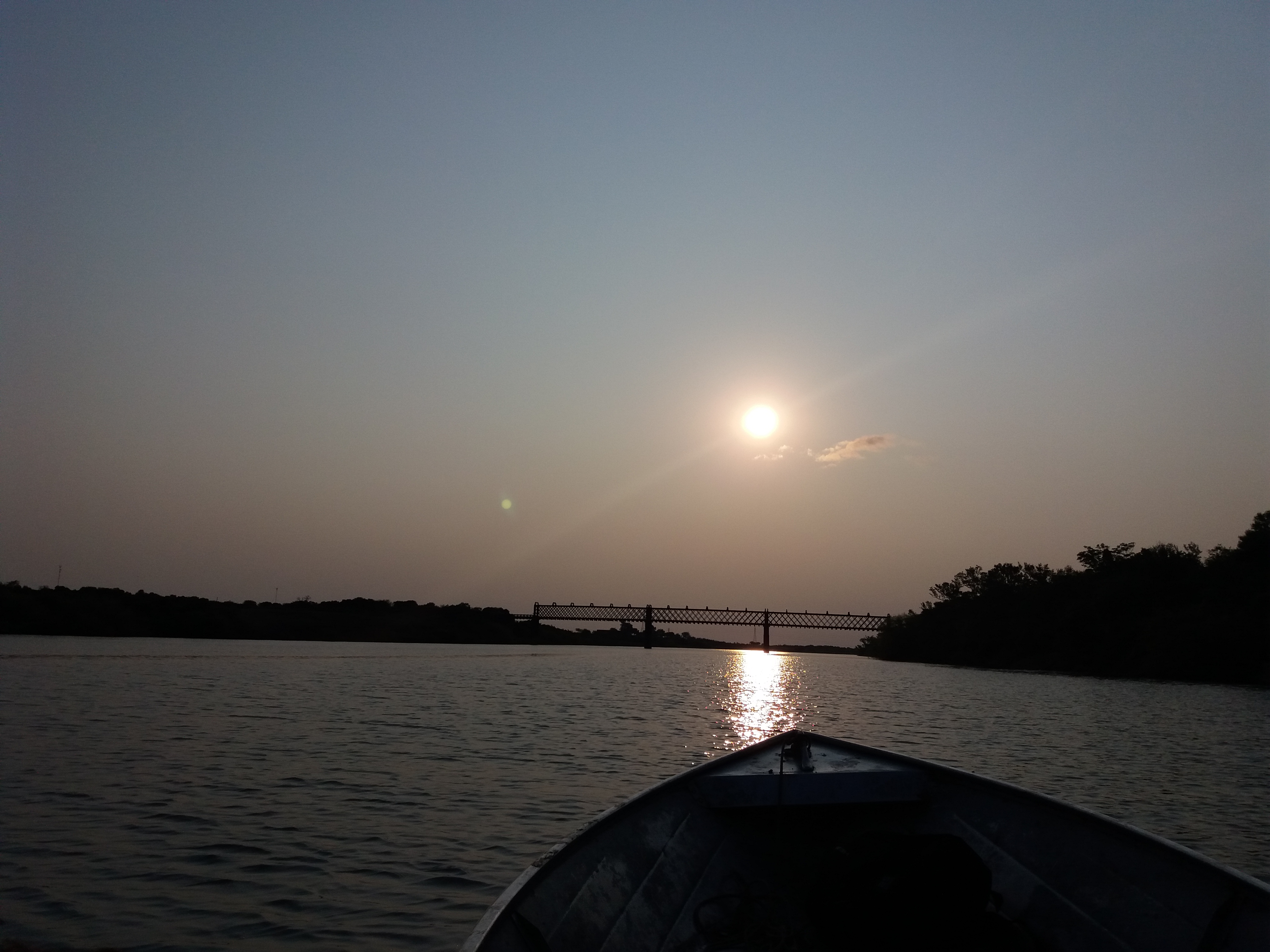

Location
- Country: Uruguay

Physical characteristics
- Source
  - location: Cuchilla de Haedo
- Mouth
  - location: Uruguay River
- Length: 227 km (141 mi)
- Basin size: 11,410 km^{2} (4,410 sq mi)

The Arapey Grande River is a river in the Salto Department of northwestern Uruguay. It flows from the northeast of department, with its headwaters near the border with Rivera Department, in a western direction and discharges in the Uruguay River. Its length is about 227 kilometres (141 mi). All of its tributaries are streams within Salto department, with its main tributaries streams being Arroyo Sarandí del Arapey, Arroyo Cambara, Arroyo Mataojo Chico, Arroyo Mataojo Grande, Arroyo del Sauce, Arroyo Valentín Grande and the Arapey Chico River, which forms part of the border with Artigas Department and has some tributaries from that department.

== See also ==
- List of rivers of Uruguay
