= Salto, Uruguay =

Salto
- Department capital city
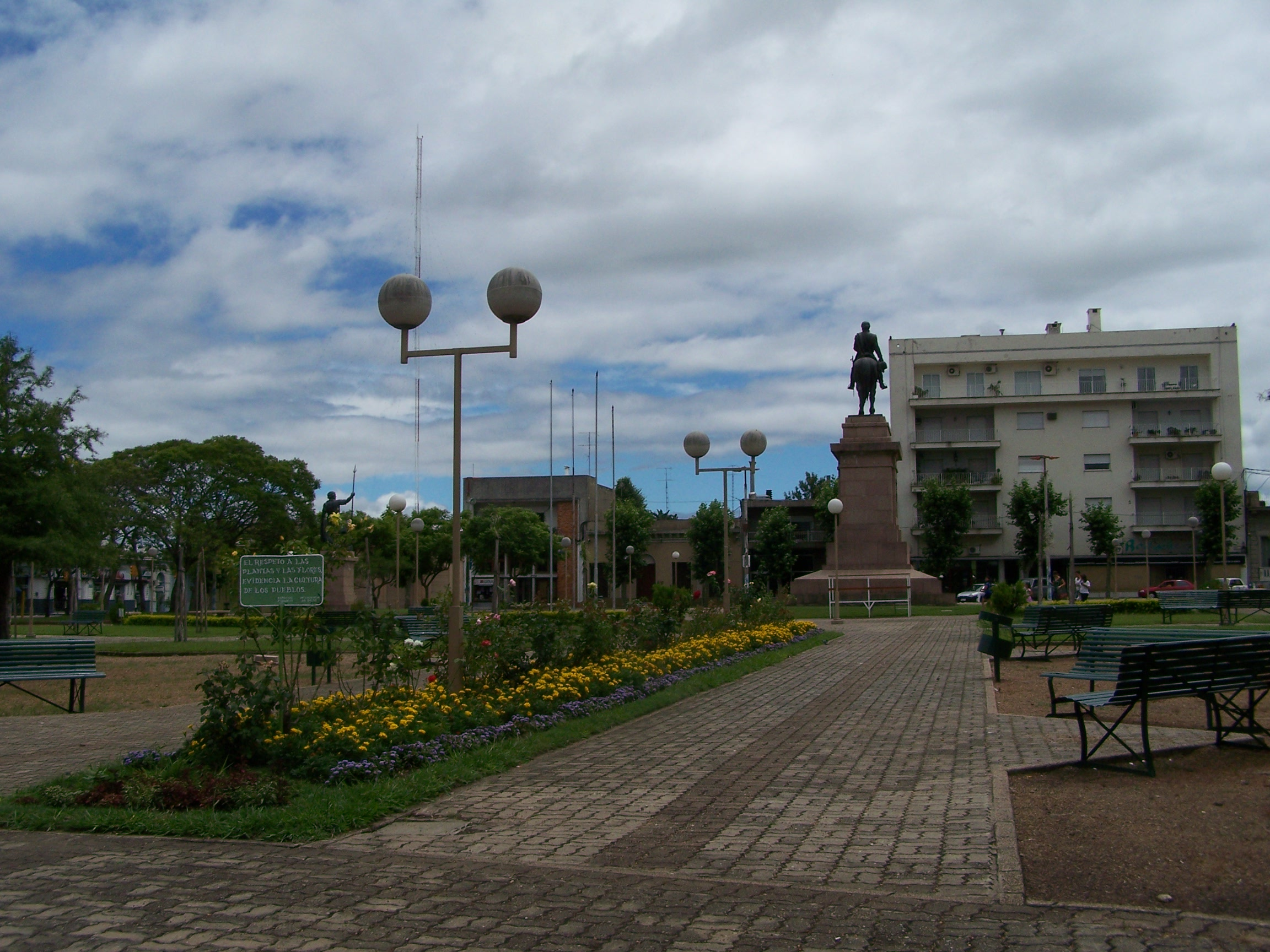
- Monument to José Gervasio Artigas, by Edmundo Prati, at Plaza Artigas in downtown Salto

- Seal
- Motto: "En el Trabajo está su Porvenir, y en la Sabiduría y Prudencia, su destino" ("Its future is in the Labour, and its destiny in Wisdom and Prudence")
- Location in Uruguay
- Coordinates: 31°23′0″S 57°57′0″W
- Country: Uruguay
- Department: Salto
- Founded: 1756

Area
  - Total: 37.0 km^{2} (14.3 sq mi)
- Elevation: 48 m (157 ft)

Population (2023 Census)
  - Total: 114,084
  - Density: 3,080/km^{2} (7,990/sq mi)
  - Demonym: salteño
- Time zone: UTC-03:00 (UYT)
- Postal code: 50000
- Dial plan: +598 473 (+5 digits)
- Climate: Cfa
- Website: www.salto.gub.uy

Salto (Spanish pronunciation: [ˈsalto]) is a city in and the capital of the Salto Department in northwestern Uruguay. As of the 2023 census it had a population of 114,084 and is the second most populated city in Uruguay, after Montevideo.

== History ==
During the Guarani War the governor of Rio de la Plata, José de Andonaegui, and the Marquis of Valdelirios pleaded with Governor José Joaquín de Viana to move north with an army of 400 men and enforce the terms of the Treaty of Madrid. In October 1756 Viana built several barracks for his army located in the area who had to survive on hunting and fishing. The sheds he built were called San Antonio del Salto Chico. Thus, the short-lived first settlement in the present city of Salto dates from 8 November 1756, which remains as its date of foundation. Some people say it was "by chance", such as the writer Francisco Bauza in his book Dominación española en Uruguay. In 1757, Viana and the superior Governor of Buenos Aires, Pedro de Cevallos, built a strong fort called San Antonio. The fort had a chapel, which was under the patronage of San Antonio de Padua. Also in that period, Spanish troops captured the Portuguese colony at Colonia del Sacramento and used its facilities for seven years before abandoning it in 1763.

On 16 June 1768, the buildings in Salto were occupied by Francisco de Paula Bucareli with 1,500 soldiers seeking to expel the Jesuits from all Spanish territory, as ordered by Carlos III. The fort of San Antonio served as an arms depot and later as a prison for most of the priests, who were later taken to Buenos Aires or deported overseas. While the Jesuits were imprisoned Lieutenant Nicolás García took care of the fort and three boats. A big flood of the Yapeyú River caused considerable damage and the fort was rebuilt at a nearby site, this time on the western side of the Uruguay River in the current Concordia area, in order to act as a river-road junction. In early 1782 the settlement already had permanent residents.

On 12 February 1811 Francisco Javier de Elío declared war on the Board of Buenos Aires. Montevideo was besieged by José Rondeau and José Gervasio Artigas, so Elío asked for help from Portugal. Later the Spanish and the Board of Buenos Aires had to sign an agreement, because Buenos Aires was blockaded by sea. In an armistice agreement it decided to lift the siege of Montevideo and the blockade of the Rio de la Plata. However, General Artigas had to withdraw to the north in what became known at the Exodus of the Western People. Among the members of the Exodus of the Western People were a considerable number of important people in Uruguayan history, including some 6,000 military personnel and 4,500 civilians. In December 1811 they camped for one month on the Uruguay River very close to Salto. In that place the Board of Buenos Aires awarded the title of Lieutenant Governor, Chief Justice and Captain of the Department to Artigas who "guided the revolutionaries in a ten-year crusade to liberate the people from Imperial Spanish rule." After the Battle of Las Piedras on 18 May 1811, Artigas was named "Chief of the Orientales". After 1820, Artigas was forced to live in exile in Paraguay but his movement had been very successful and led to the establishment of the First Republic of Uruguay on 25 August 1825.

Before the Independence of Uruguay Salto had acquired the category of "Pueblo" (village) and on 16 May 1835, by Decree, it was recognized as being a "Villa" (town). Then, on 16 June 1837, Salto was made capital of the department by the Act of Ley Nº 158.

In late October 1845 roughly 1,000 of Giuseppe Garibaldi's Italian and Uruguayan troops advanced up the Uruguay River and took Gualeguaychú in Argentina before seizing Salto, remaining there several months as they plotted against Justo José de Urquiza, Cesar Diaz and Servando Gomez. On 8 February 1846 Garibaldi defeated Gomez's army, killing several hundred at San Antonio Chico Creek outside Salto. Garibaldi lost about a hundred men in the battle. Montevideo accepted him as General on February 16 when news of his victory reached the city.

On 8 June 1863 Salto's status was elevated to "Ciudad" (city) by the Act of Ley Nº 780, which was reaffirmed on 3 March 1869 by the Act of Ley Nº 1.000.

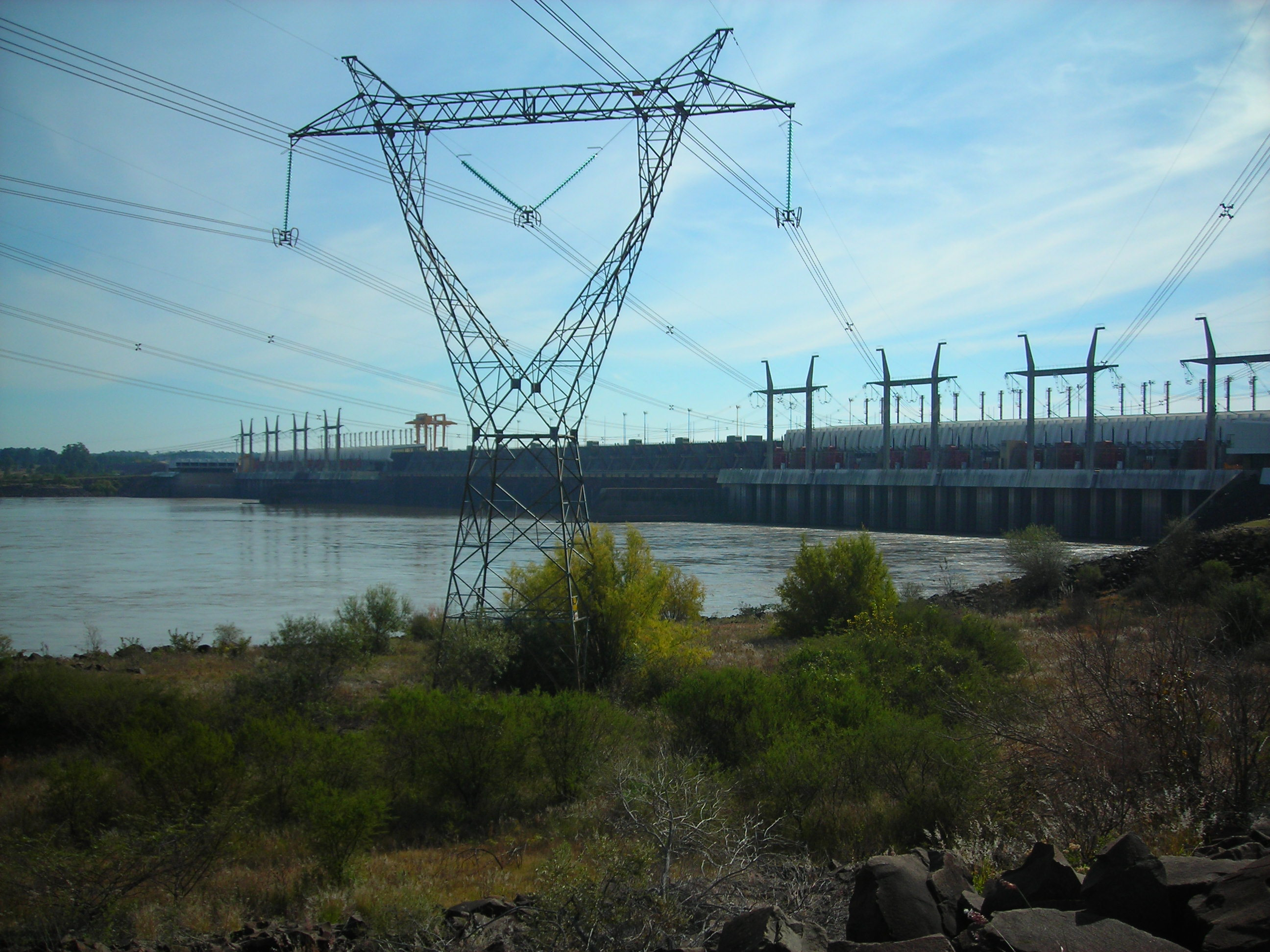
Salto Grande Dam

During the late 2010s, Salto city saw a spate in criminal activity similar to those of other border cities across Latin America like Ciudad Juarez, Mexico, with drug trafficking and femicides among the principal crimes committed. According to Nicolas SantAnna, the president of the local commerce and industry syndicate, Salto's Don Atilio has become Uruguay's most dangerous barrio.

== Population ==
In 2023, Salto had a population of 114,084.

Year	Population
1834	1,315
1852	2,882
1908	19,788
1963	57,975
1975	73,897
1985	80,821
1996	93,117
2004	99,072
2011	104,028
2023	114,084

Source: National Statistics Institute

== Geography ==
The city is located on Route 3 about 496 kilometres (308 mi) northwest of Montevideo, and on the east bank of the Río Uruguay across from the city of Concordia in Argentina. About 12 kilometres (7.5 mi) north of the city the Salto Grande Bridge, built on top of the Salto Grande Dam, joins the two sides.

Built on hills and bluffs, the city is situated near the Rio Uruguay's 'big jump' falls, which is also the location of the Salto Grande Dam. The land is low lying alongside the river bank, with an elevation of 48 metres (157 ft) above sea level.

=== Climate ===
Salto has a humid subtropical climate typical of the region, with sunny and hot summers with occasional heavy rainfall combined with mild winters.

Climate data for Salto (1991–2020, extremes 1942–2020)
Month	Jan	Feb	Mar	Apr	May	Jun	Jul	Aug	Sep	Oct	Nov	Dec	Year
Record high °C (°F)	42.2 (108.0)	41.6 (106.9)	40.0 (104.0)	37.0 (98.6)	32.4 (90.3)	30.8 (87.4)	31.6 (88.9)	35.5 (95.9)	38.4 (101.1)	37.8 (100.0)	39.5 (103.1)	41.0 (105.8)	42.2 (108.0)
Mean daily maximum °C (°F)	32.2 (90.0)	30.7 (87.3)	29.0 (84.2)	25.2 (77.4)	21.1 (70.0)	18.5 (65.3)	18.1 (64.6)	20.8 (69.4)	22.4 (72.3)	25.1 (77.2)	28.3 (82.9)	30.7 (87.3)	25.2 (77.4)
Daily mean °C (°F)	25.6 (78.1)	24.6 (76.3)	22.7 (72.9)	19.2 (66.6)	15.7 (60.3)	13.2 (55.8)	12.6 (54.7)	14.5 (58.1)	16.1 (61.0)	19.0 (66.2)	21.7 (71.1)	24.0 (75.2)	19.1 (66.4)
Mean daily minimum °C (°F)	19.1 (66.4)	18.4 (65.1)	16.5 (61.7)	13.4 (56.1)	10.3 (50.5)	8.0 (46.4)	7.1 (44.8)	8.2 (46.8)	9.9 (49.8)	12.9 (55.2)	15.0 (59.0)	17.3 (63.1)	13.0 (55.4)
Record low °C (°F)	8.3 (46.9)	7.0 (44.6)	4.4 (39.9)	0.4 (32.7)	−2.0 (28.4)	−5.6 (21.9)	−5.0 (23.0)	−3.6 (25.5)	−3.0 (26.6)	−0.8 (30.6)	3.6 (38.5)	5.4 (41.7)	−5.6 (21.9)
Average precipitation mm (inches)	129.6 (5.10)	142.1 (5.59)	128.4 (5.06)	157.2 (6.19)	105.2 (4.14)	79.9 (3.15)	55.1 (2.17)	69.4 (2.73)	86.3 (3.40)	149.5 (5.89)	130.5 (5.14)	152.6 (6.01)	1,385.8 (54.56)
Average precipitation days (≥ 1.0 mm)	7	7	7	7	6	5	5	5	6	8	7	7	77
Average relative humidity (%)	62	67	70	75	78	80	76	72	69	69	65	62	71
Mean monthly sunshine hours	283.1	238.7	242.5	193.2	168.1	140.7	164.5	195.6	201.0	222.6	260.0	281.8	2,591.8
Source 1: Instituto Uruguayo de Metereología
Source 2: NOAA (precipitation and sun 1991–2020), Instituto Nacional de Investigación Agropecuaria (humidity 1980–2009)

== Architecture ==
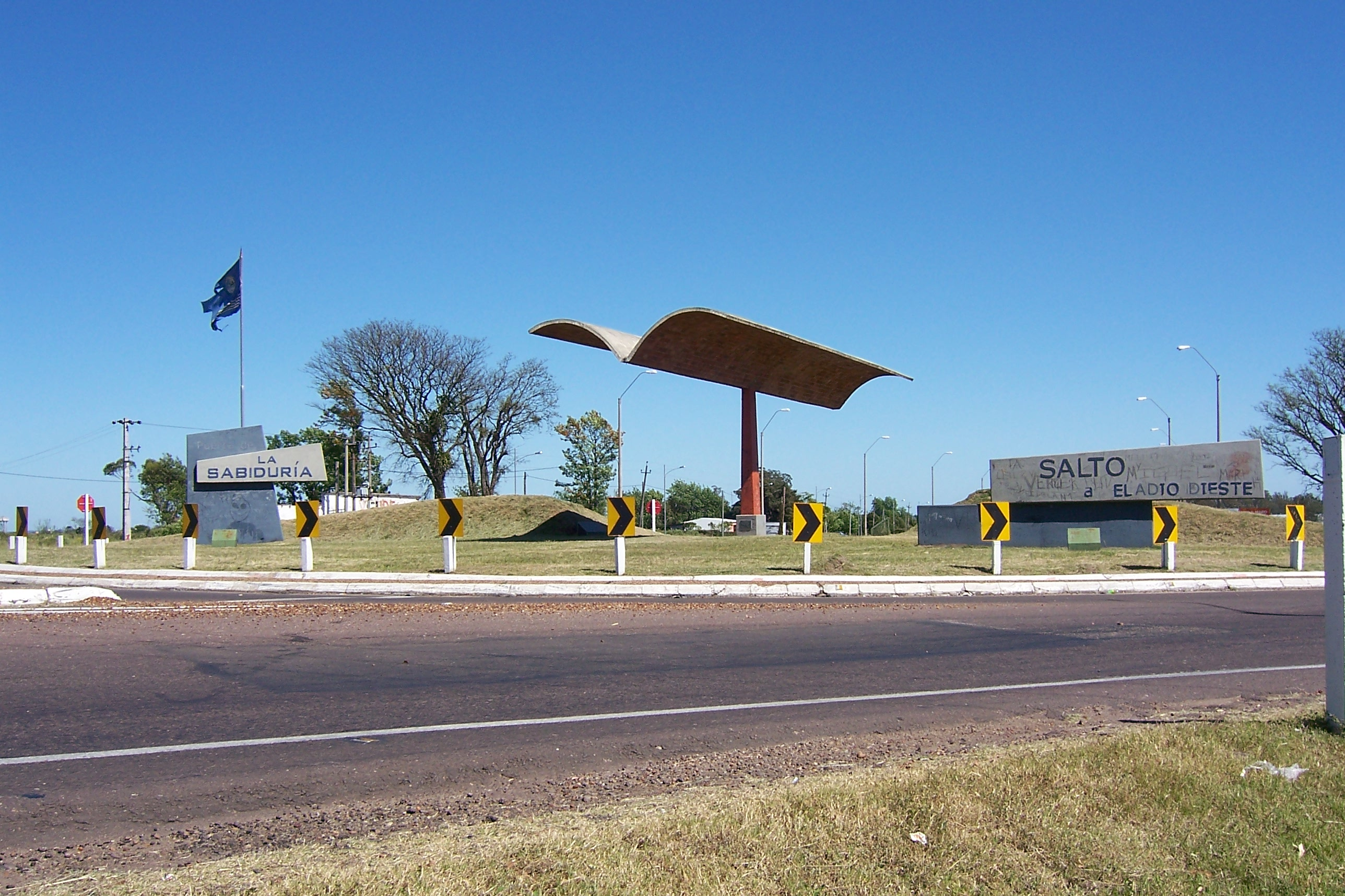
Eladio Dieste Monument

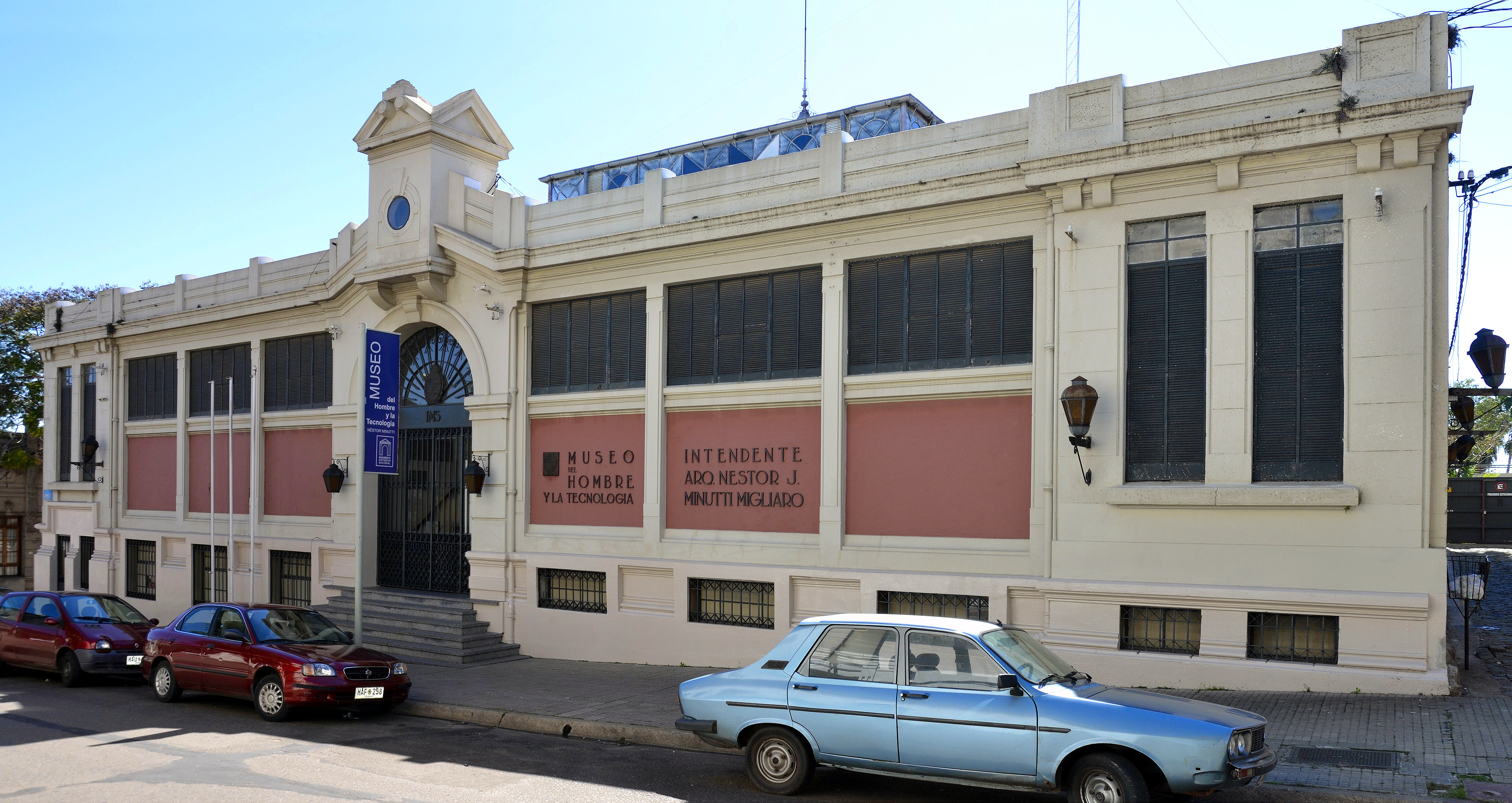
Museo del Hombre y la Tecnología

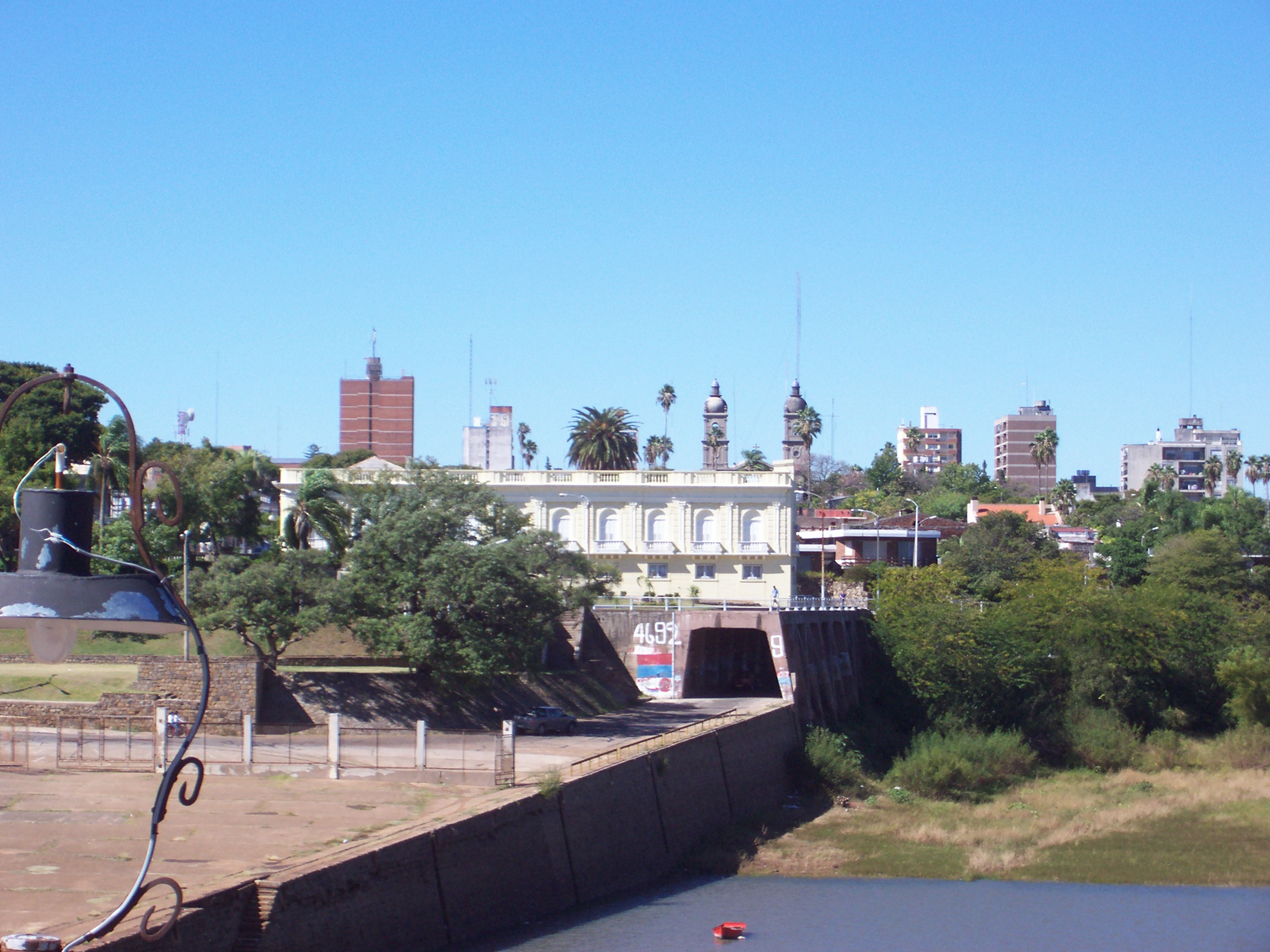
Salto seen from the harbor

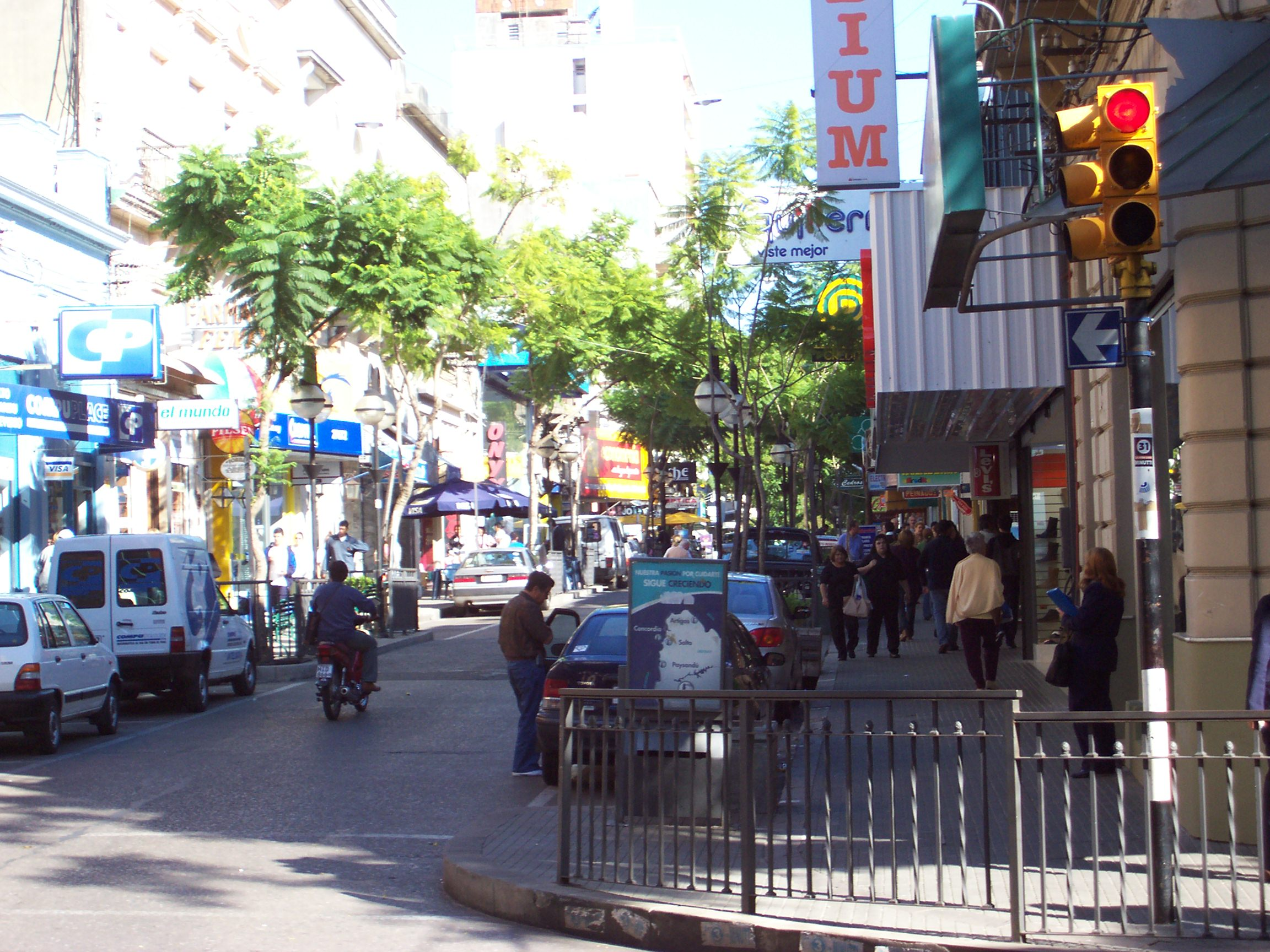
Calle Uruguay, Downtown Salto

At the entrance of the city there is a memorial to the engineer Eladio Dieste. The memorial is formally called "La Puerta de la Sabiduría" ("The Door of Wisdom") and commonly known as "La Gaviota" ("The Seagull"). It was constructed by moving a structure built for station facilities and service by Leggiero Barbieri, a now-defunct trading firm. It is located at the intersection of Route 3 and Route 31 with Avenida Pascual Harriague, named after Pascual Harriague, who introduced grape cultivation in Uruguay. Salto is the site of a large number of works by Eladio Dieste, including an industrial warehouse/factory (Refrescos del Norte, 1978), an inn (north coast), a Municipal Bus Terminal, and a private bus company terminal (Turlit, 1980). Other prominent architects include J.P. Sanguinetti with his masterpiece "El Campo y yo".

The center of the city lies on Calle Uruguay, the heart of the business district, and many of the historic buildings in the immediate vicinity are significant. An apartment building called "El Mirador", the highest building in the city, opened in 2007. A museum of note is the Museo del Hombre y la Tecnología. There is a Plaza named after General Artigas in the central part of the city, containing a large statue of him. The largest park in the city is called the Parque Solari.

== Places of worship ==
- Cathedral Basilica of St. John the Baptist (Roman Catholic)
- Holy Cross Parish Church (Roman Catholic)
- Sacred Heart of Jesus Parish Church (Roman Catholic)
- Parish Church of Our Lady of Mt. Carmel (Roman Catholic)

== Culture ==
Popular activities among young people include drinking mate (an herbal beverage), going dancing at night and crossing into Argentina to go shopping in Concordia on weekends. One of the attractions are the thermal pools located close to the city. They are kept at over 38 °C (100 F) around the year. Salto is also known for its street Calle Uruguay, where locals stroll during weekend nights to socialize and drink mate with friends. Despite its many slum areas, Salto is considered one of the higher class areas of Uruguay for its various amenities that most of the country is lacking. The International Cultural Centre was founded in Salto in August 1990. The main football club is Salto Fútbol Club which plays in the Uruguayan Segunda División. Their home ground is located at the Estadio Ernesto Dickinson, which has a capacity of about 6,500.

=== Sports ===
Salto was one of the host cities of the official 1967 Basketball World Cup.

== Health ==
The public health system in city is heavily supported by the regional national hospital Hospital Regional de Salto, which has 258 conventional beds and 30 intensive care beds.

=== Risks ===
Because of its geography, near other regions with Aedes aegypti mosquitos, Salto is one of the more vulnerable cities to mosquito-borne diseases like dengue fever.

== Transportation ==
Salto lies at the junction of the north–south National Route 3 and east–west National Route 31 on the eastern bank at the beginning of the Lower Uruguay River, opposite the Argentine city of Concordia. The city is located 145 kilometres (90 mi) by road south of Bella Unión and 120 kilometres (75 mi) by road north of Paysandu. It is located 225 kilometres (140 mi) by road west of Tacuarembo.

Salto is connected to Montevideo by regular bus services and by the railroad track Montevideo – Salto – Artigas. The main railway station is the Salto railway station (Estacion Salto). Nueva Hesperides International Airport had scheduled connections with Montevideo until 2015, enabling easy access to the local thermal baths. There are plans to improve it and local business people are keen to see it expand, allowing freight (particularly fruit) to be shipped directly from the region.

It is served by the Nueva Hesperides International Airport.

== Notable people ==
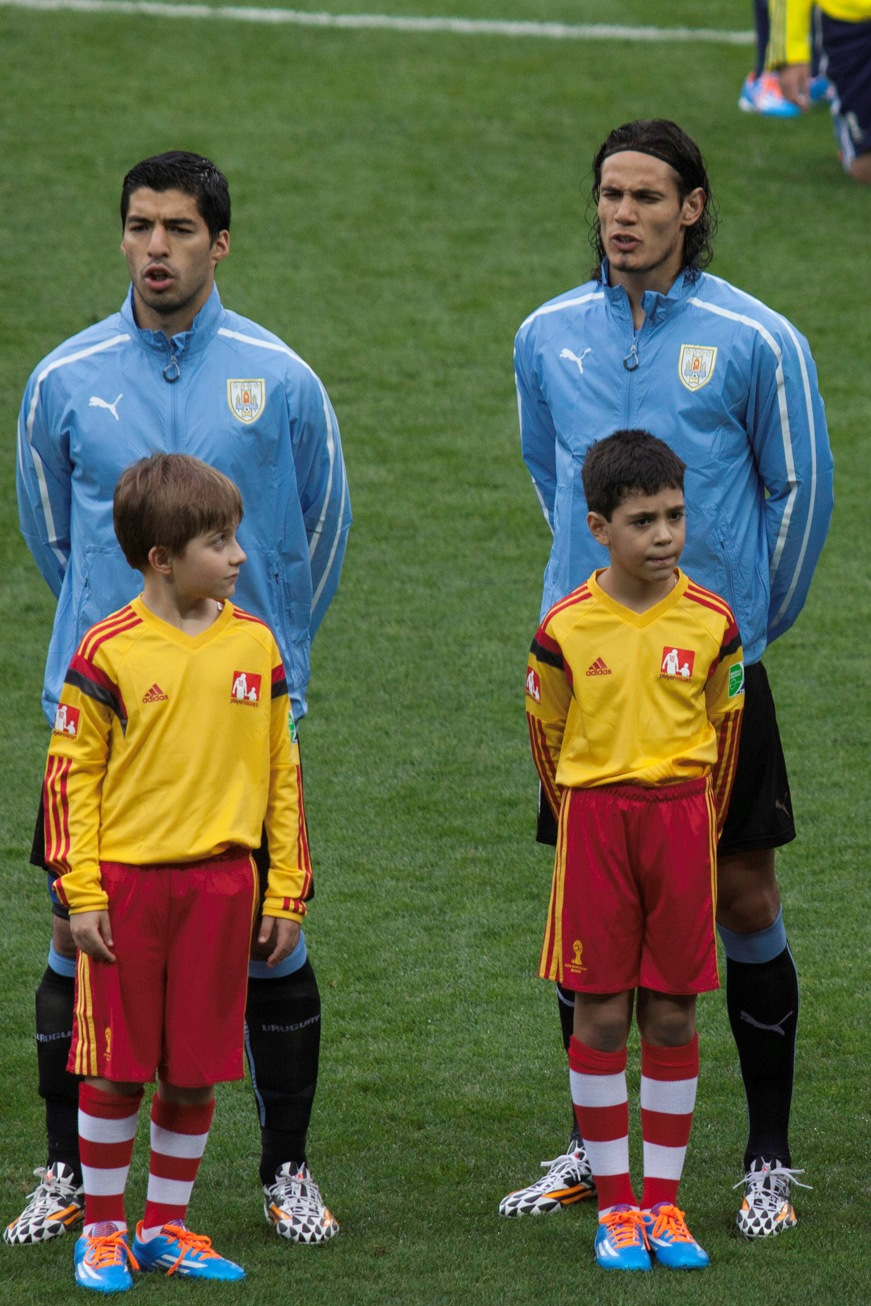
International footballers Luis Suárez and Edinson Cavani are from Salto.

- Uruguayan author Horacio Quiroga was born in Salto in 1878.
- Enrique Amorim was born in Salto in 1900.
- Pedro Rocha, intercontinental champion, Peñarol, was born in 1942.
- Professional footballers Luis Suárez, Edinson Cavani and Bruno Fornaroli were born in Salto in 1987. The former two were members of the Uruguay squads that achieved a fourth-place finish at the 2010 FIFA World Cup and won the 2011 Copa América, while the latter played for Australia at the 2023 AFC Asian Cup.
- Cecilia Eguiluz, lawyer and politician, was born in Salto in 1974
- Association of Tennis Professionals Uruguayan No.1 Pablo Cuevas resides in Salto, though he was born in Argentina.

== See also ==
- List of diplomatic missions in Uruguay#Salto
