= Idalba de Almeida =

Venezuelan politician

Sotillo Municipality mayor
- In office 1989–1992
- Succeeded by: José León Brito

Personal details
- Party: Acción Democrática
- Occupation: Politician

Flor Idalba de Almeida is a Venezuelan politician. She was the first mayor elected by direct vote of the Sotillo Municipality (Puerto La Cruz), in the Anzoátegui state, as well as the first woman to be elected to the position.

== Career ==
She was the first mayor elected by direct vote in the Juan Antonio Sotillo Municipality (Puerto La Cruz), in the Anzoátegui state, as well as the first woman to be elected to the post. She was also president of her city council and one of the founders of the project known as the Mancomunidad de los Desechos Sólidos Urbanos (Masur).

After her term as mayor, she continued to work as a militant of Acción Democrática. De Alemida supported the candidate of the Democratic Unity Roundtable (MUD) for the governorship of Anzoátegui in the 2012 regional elections, Antonio Barreto Sira, being a member of the regional organization "Mujeres por el Progreso" (Women for Progress).
