= Puerto La Cruz refinery =

Coordinates: 10.221°N 64.621°W

The Puerto La Cruz refinery, also known as the Guaranguão refinery, is a hydrocarbon refining complex located in Puerto La Cruz, Anzoátegui State, Venezuela. It is the country's second-largest refinery in terms of production, with 200,000 barrels per day, after the Paraguaná refinery complex with 940,000 barrels per day.

== History ==
Construction of the refinery complex began in 1948, and it commenced operations in 1950 with a daily production of 44,000 barrels, gradually increasing to 200,000 barrels by 2000.

On 11 August 2012, lightning struck a processing lagoon at the complex, causing a major fire, but no casualties were reported.
