= Mochima National Park =

Protected area in Venezuela

- IUCN category II (national park)
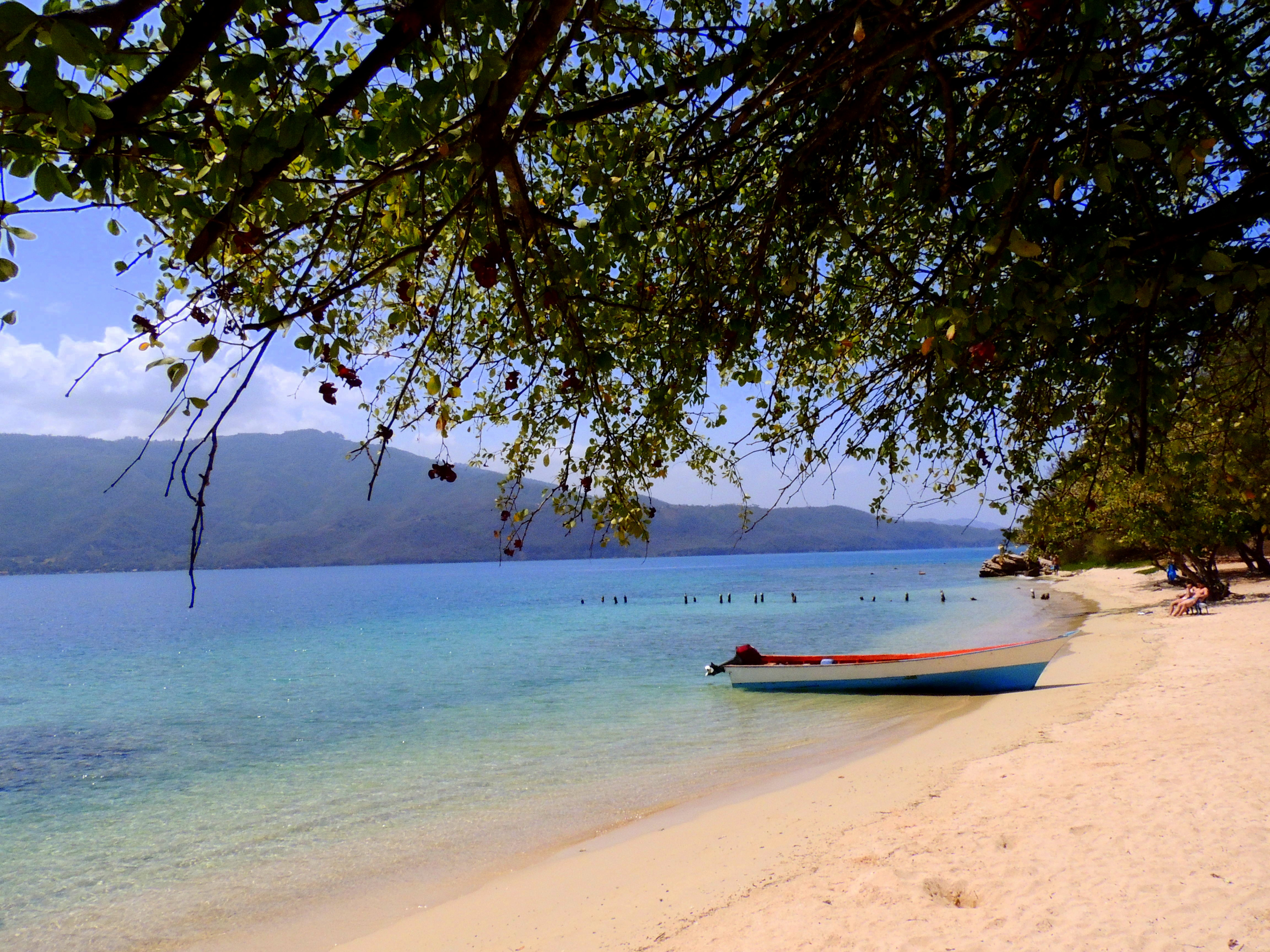

- Location within Venezuela
- Location: Sucre (state), Venezuela
- Nearest city: Cumaná
- Coordinates: 10°15′41″N 64°28′48″W
- Area: 949.35 km^{2} (366.55 sq mi)
- Established: December 19, 1973
- Visitors: ~ 500,000 (in 2005)
- Governing body: INPARQUES
- Website: Official website

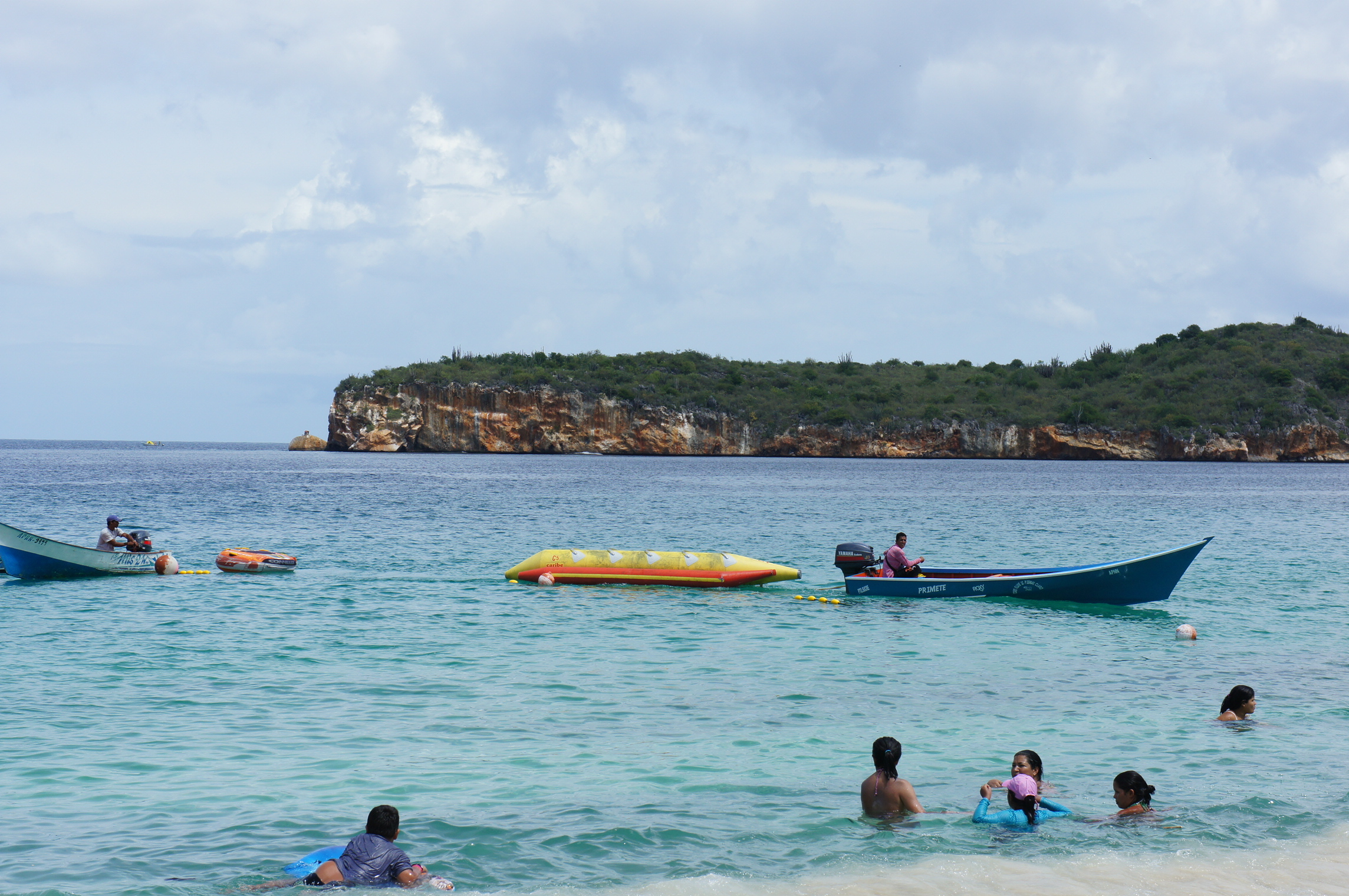
Blanca Beach

Mochima National Park (/moʊˈtʃiːmə/ moh-CHEE-mə) is located in the Anzoátegui and Sucre states, on the northeastern coast of Venezuela. The park covers 94,935 hectares and is made up of an exclusively marine area in its western sector (Anzoátegui State), a coastal marine area that includes the Gulf of Santa Fé and Mochima Bay, and a mountainous area that covers the Turimiquire Dam watershed (Sucre State). Mochima Park was created to protect the montane forests of the Turimiquire Range and the country's eastern Caribbean Sea marine landscapes.

== History ==
Mochima National Park was created on December 19, 1973. Named after the town of Mochima, it is one of numerous national parks along Venezuela's northeast Caribbean coastline. It was the second marine park in Venezuela and encompasses the entire shoreline between Puerto La Cruz and Cumaná plus 32 islands just offshore.

== Geography ==
This coast is a mountainous zone with beaches, gulfs and inlets of extraordinary beauty. Because of various microclimates, some areas have gigantic cliffs nearly devoid of vegetation dropping into the water, while others are lush with jungle vegetation and sandy beaches. Many small towns have sprung up along the 50 km between the cities on either side (Puerto La Cruz and Cumaná).

== Climate ==
Year-round temperatures range between 20 and 26 °C. Coastal climate has high temperatures and constant trade winds from November until May, while it is a bit cooler with more humidity from June to October.

== Size ==
The park measures 949 km^{2} (366 sq mi).

== Fauna and flora ==
Marine waters in the park are rich in cetacean diversities, including such as humpback whales, Bryde's whales, sperm whales, pilot whales, and several species of dolphins. The turtle grass present in Mochima Bay provides a good environment for many gastropods and mollusks such as Eared ark clam, Tiger lucine, Buttonsnail, and Turkey wing clam.

== Gallery ==
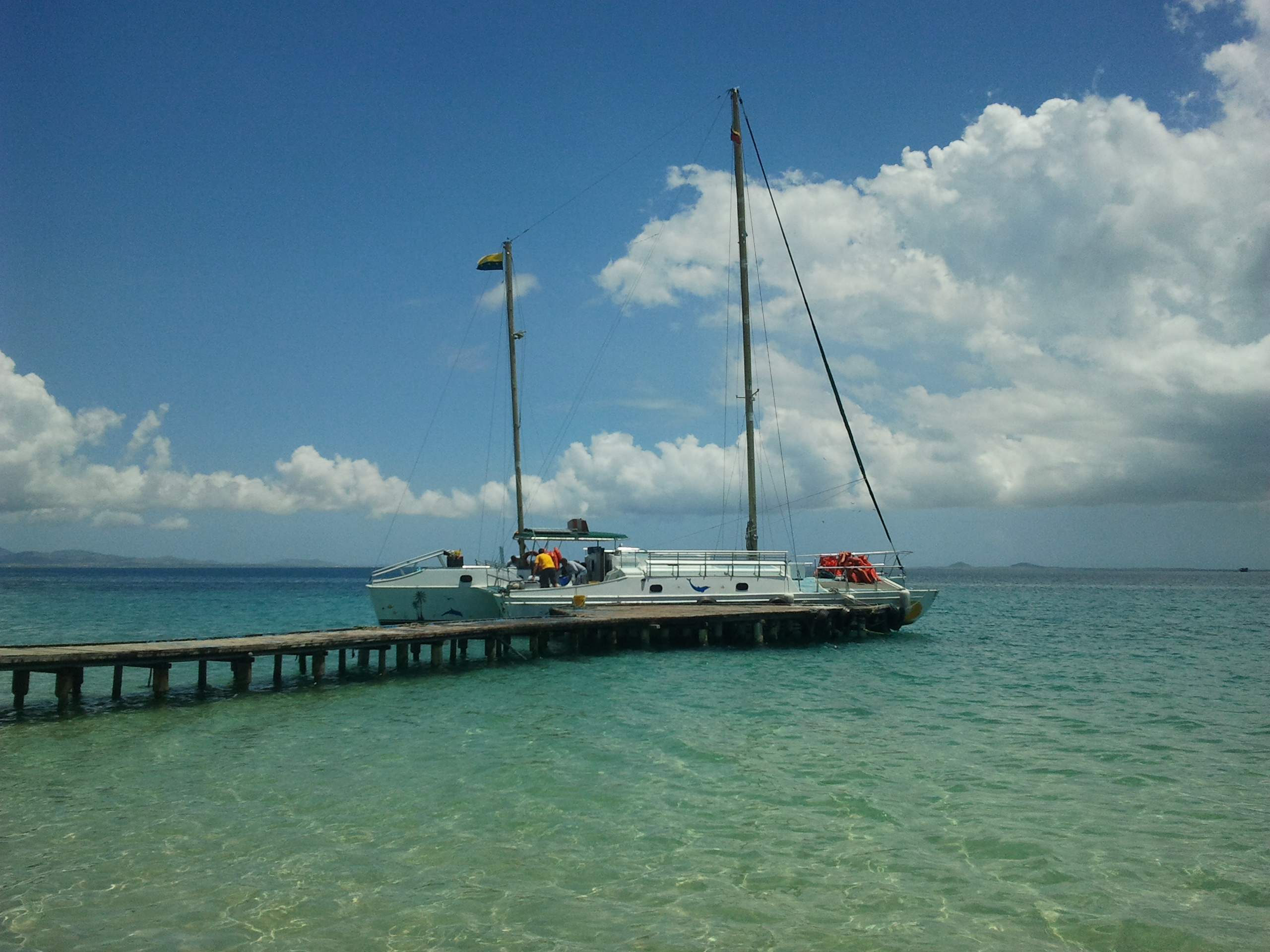
Beach in Mochima Park

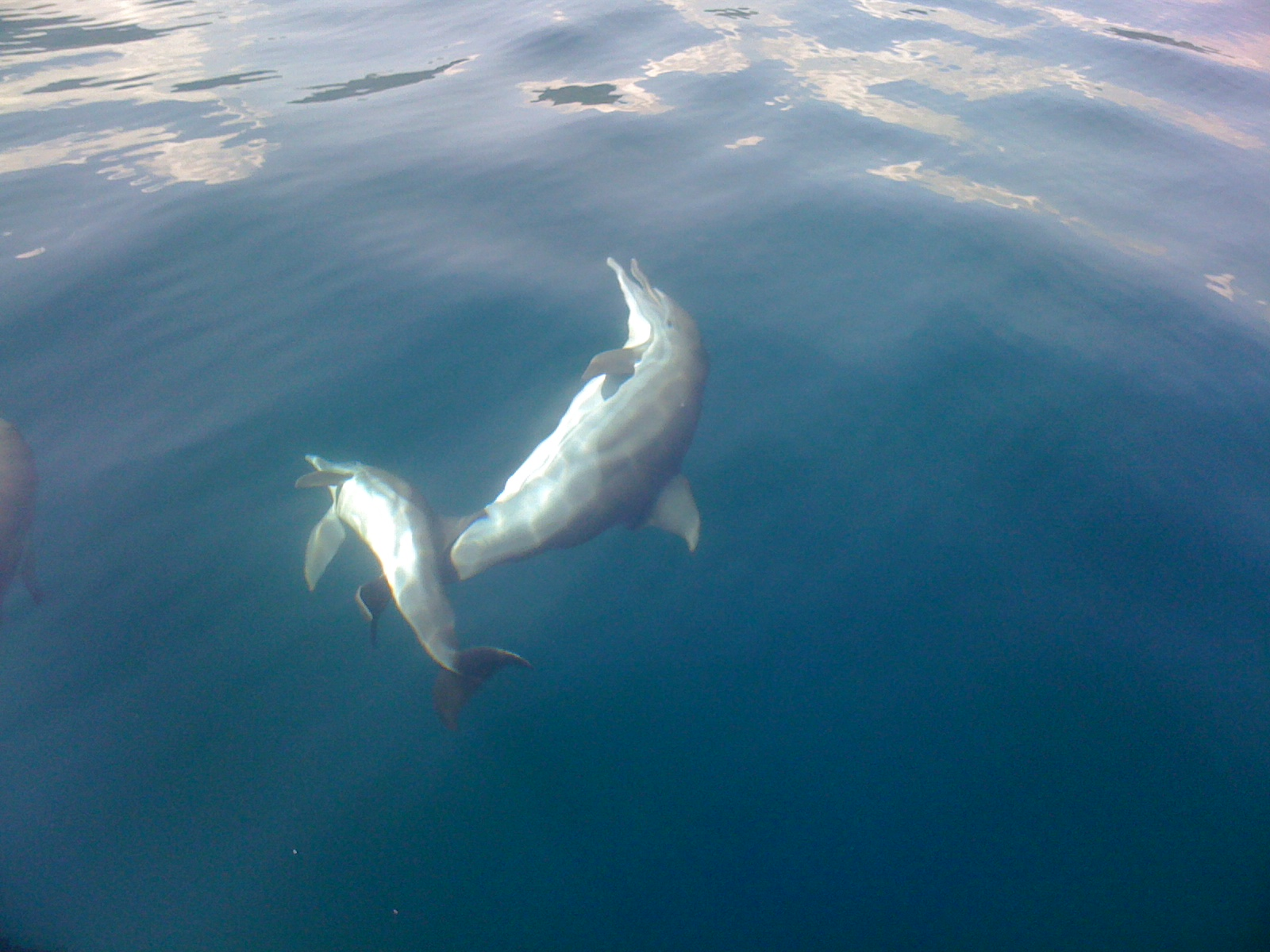
Long-beaked common dolphins nearby Isla de Plata

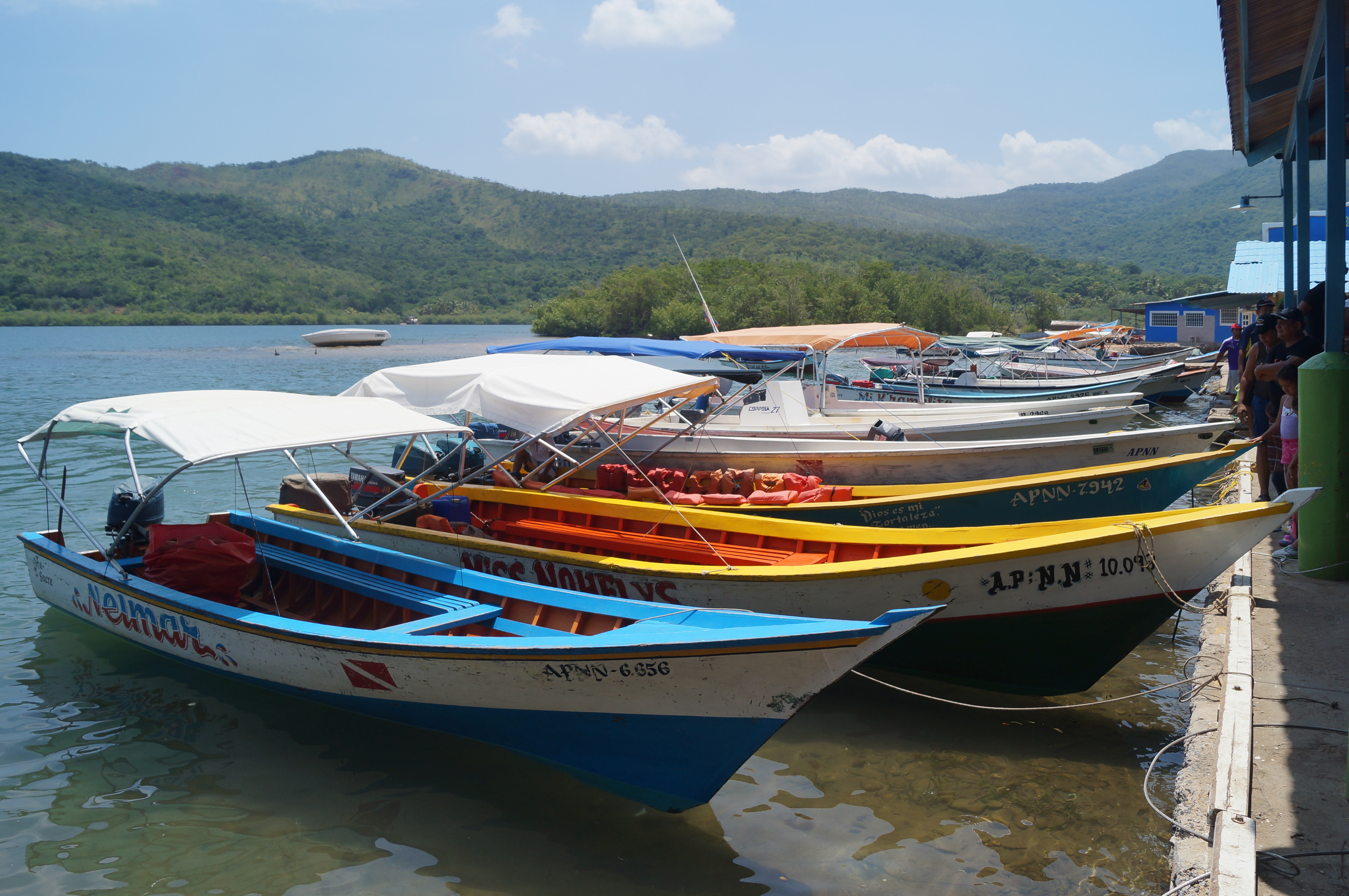
Boats in Mochima Park

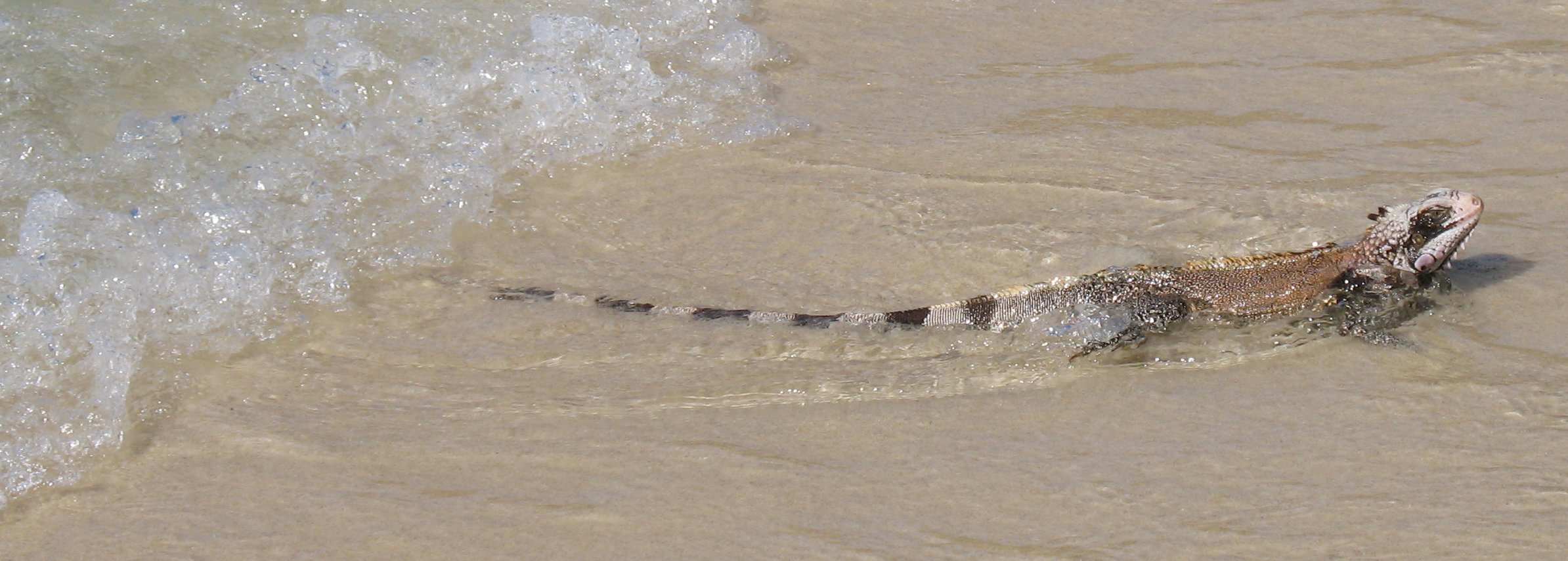

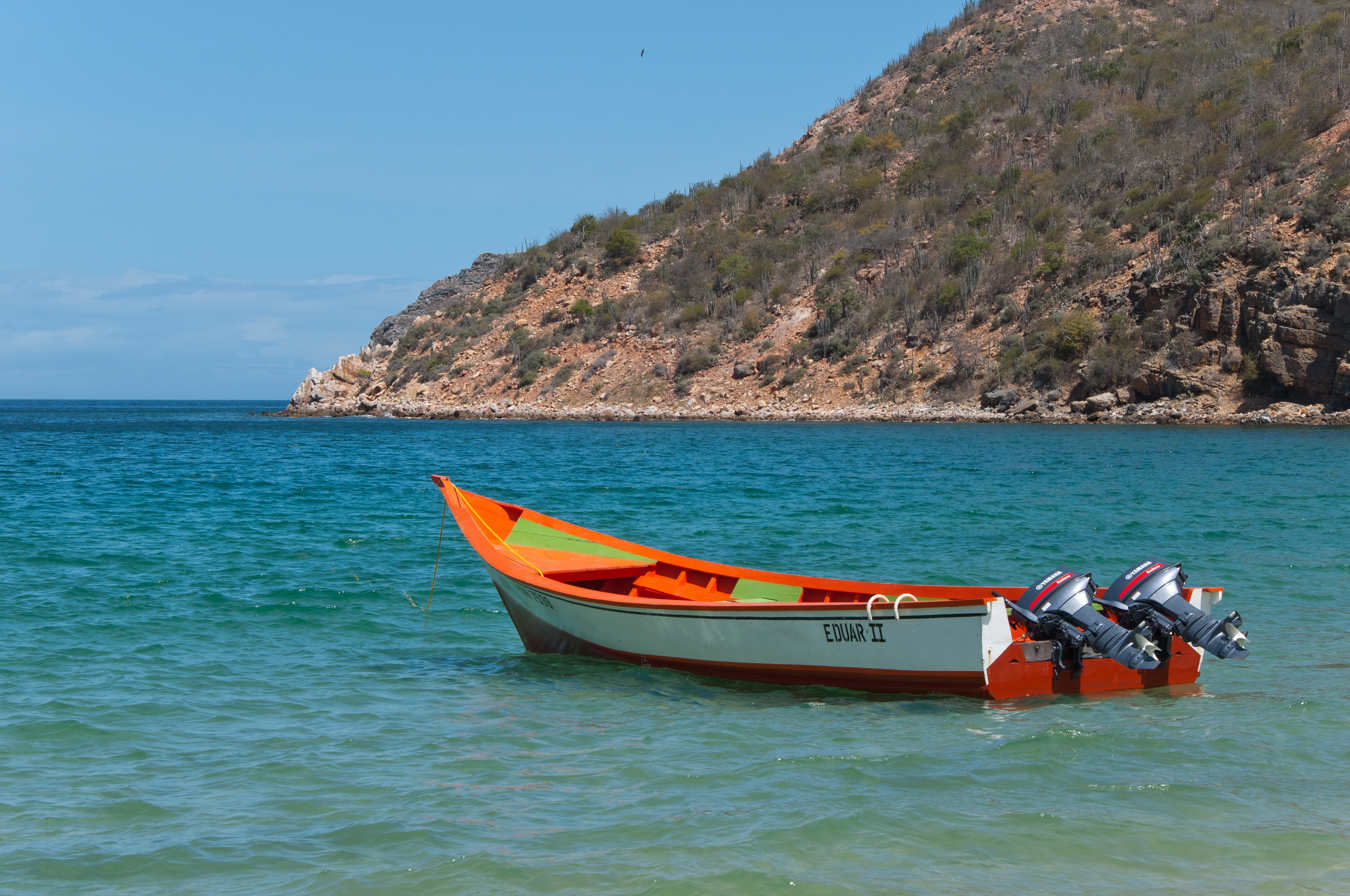
Manzanilla Beach

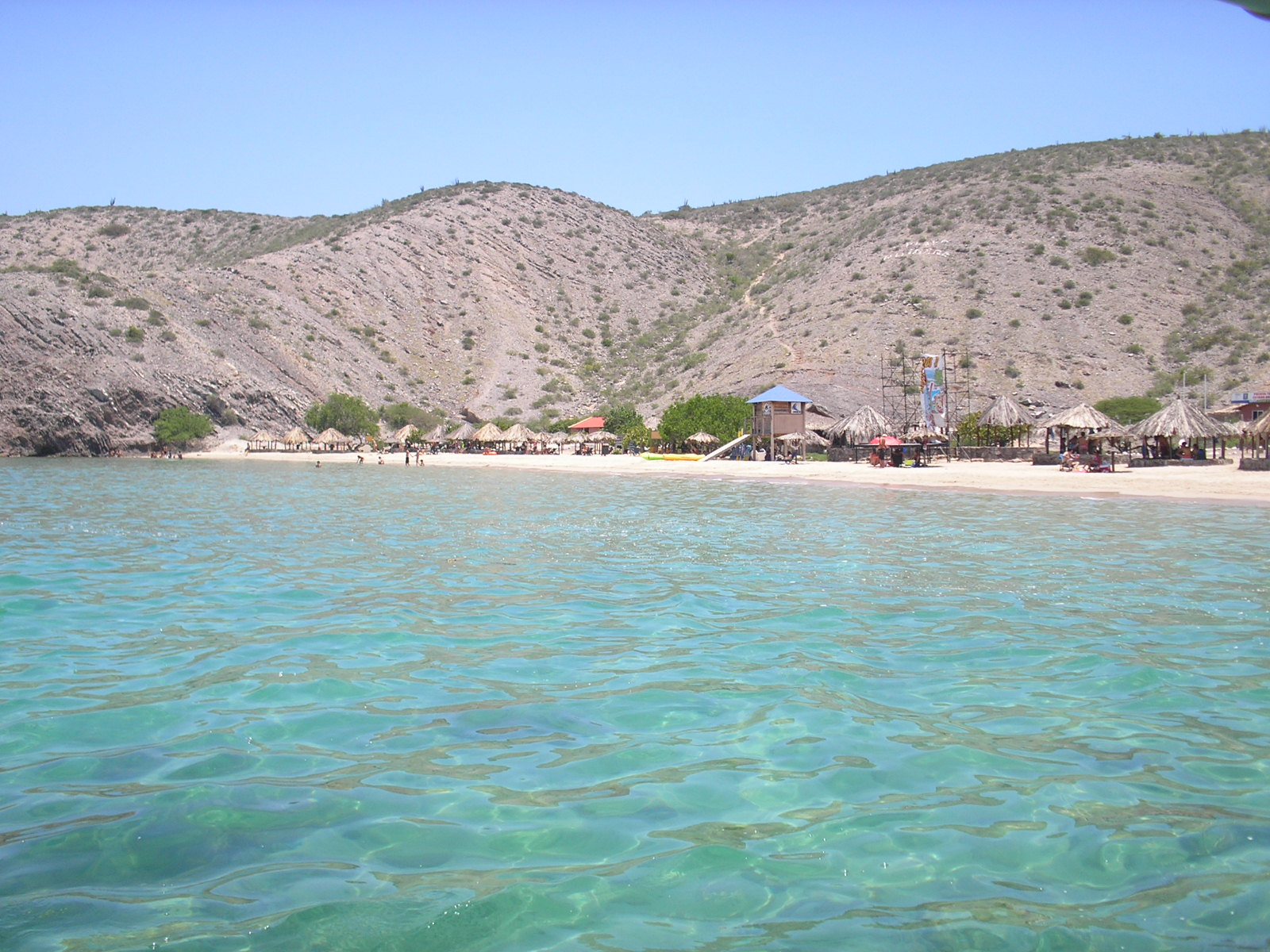
Puinare Island

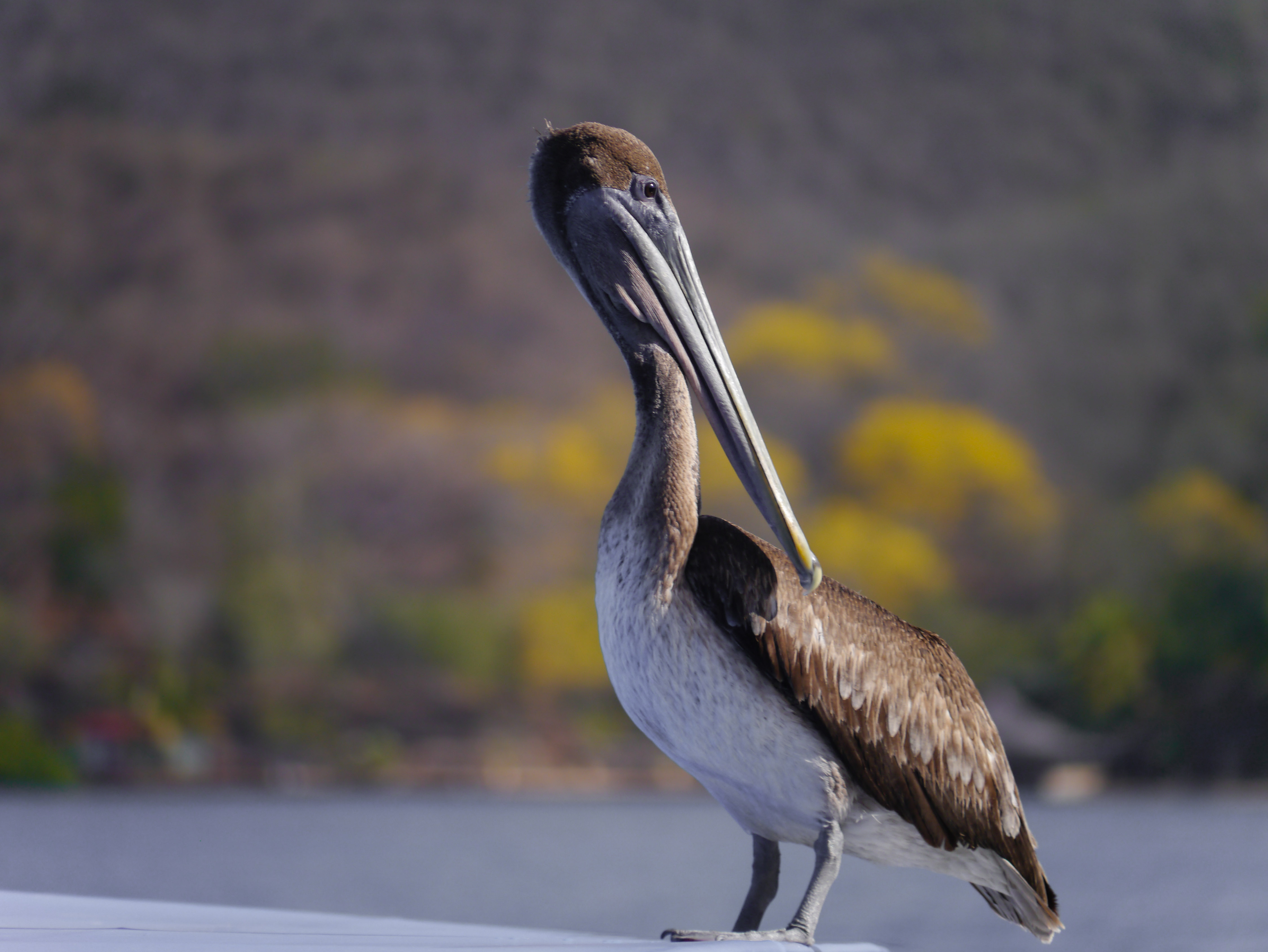

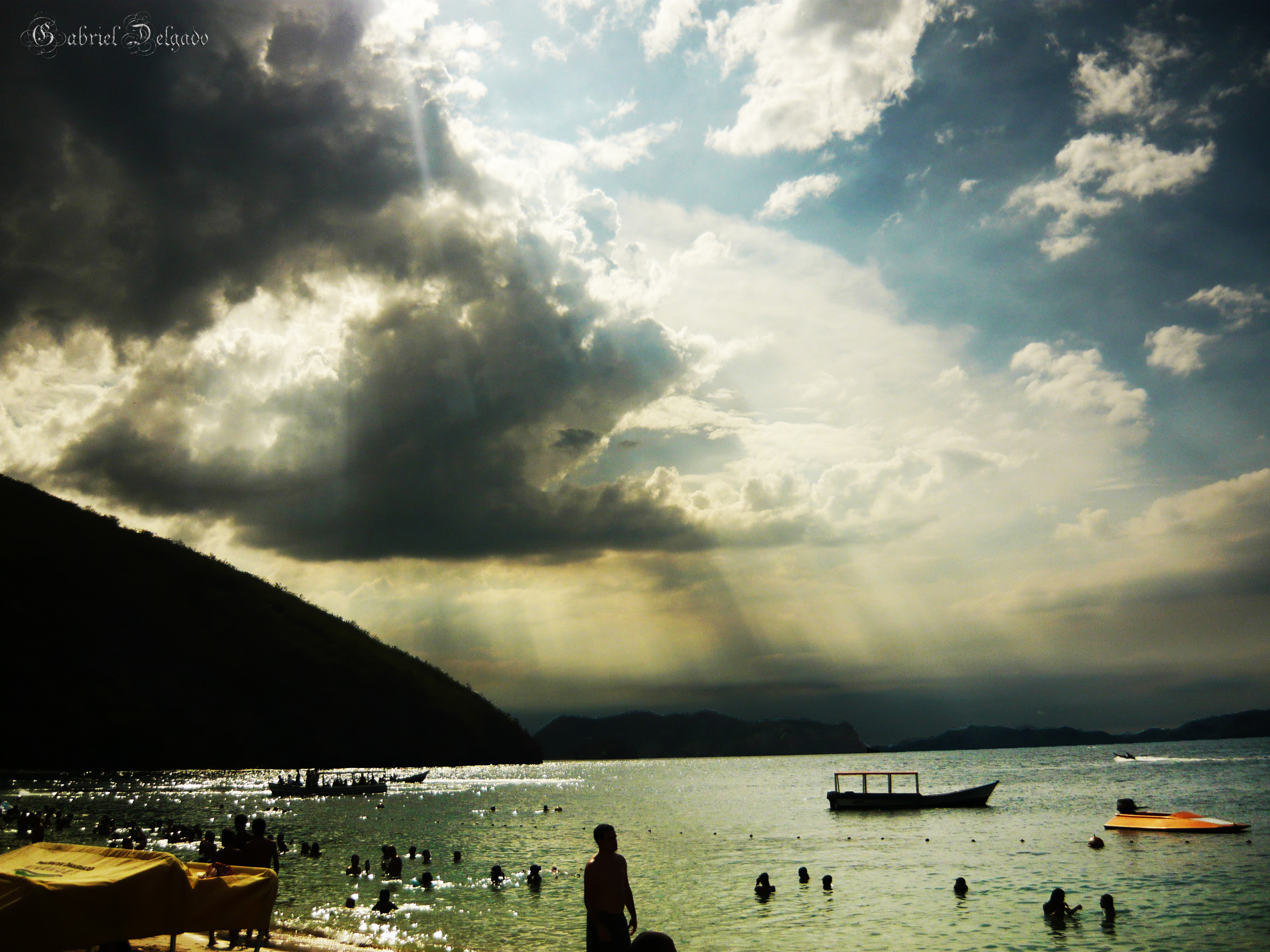

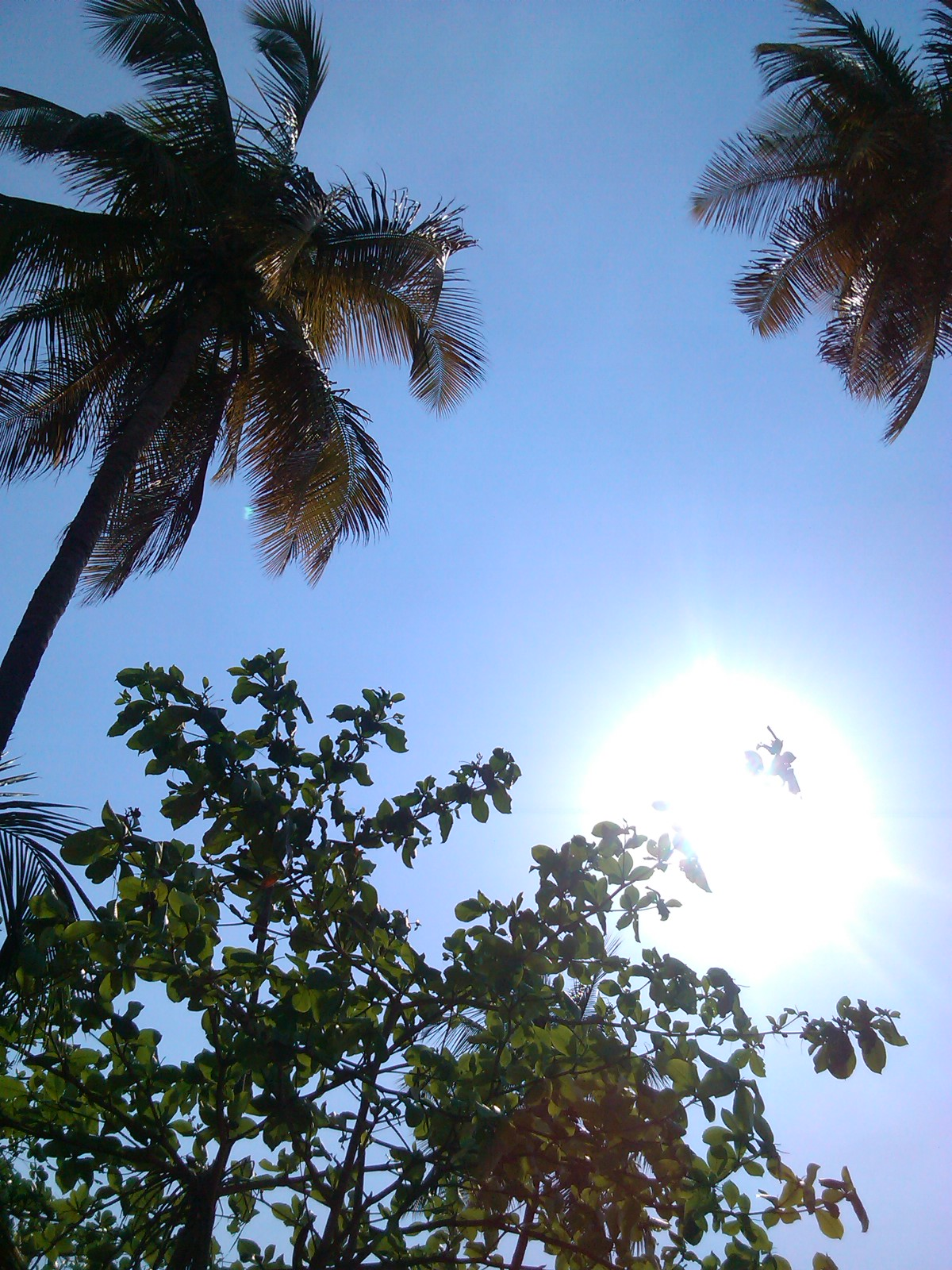

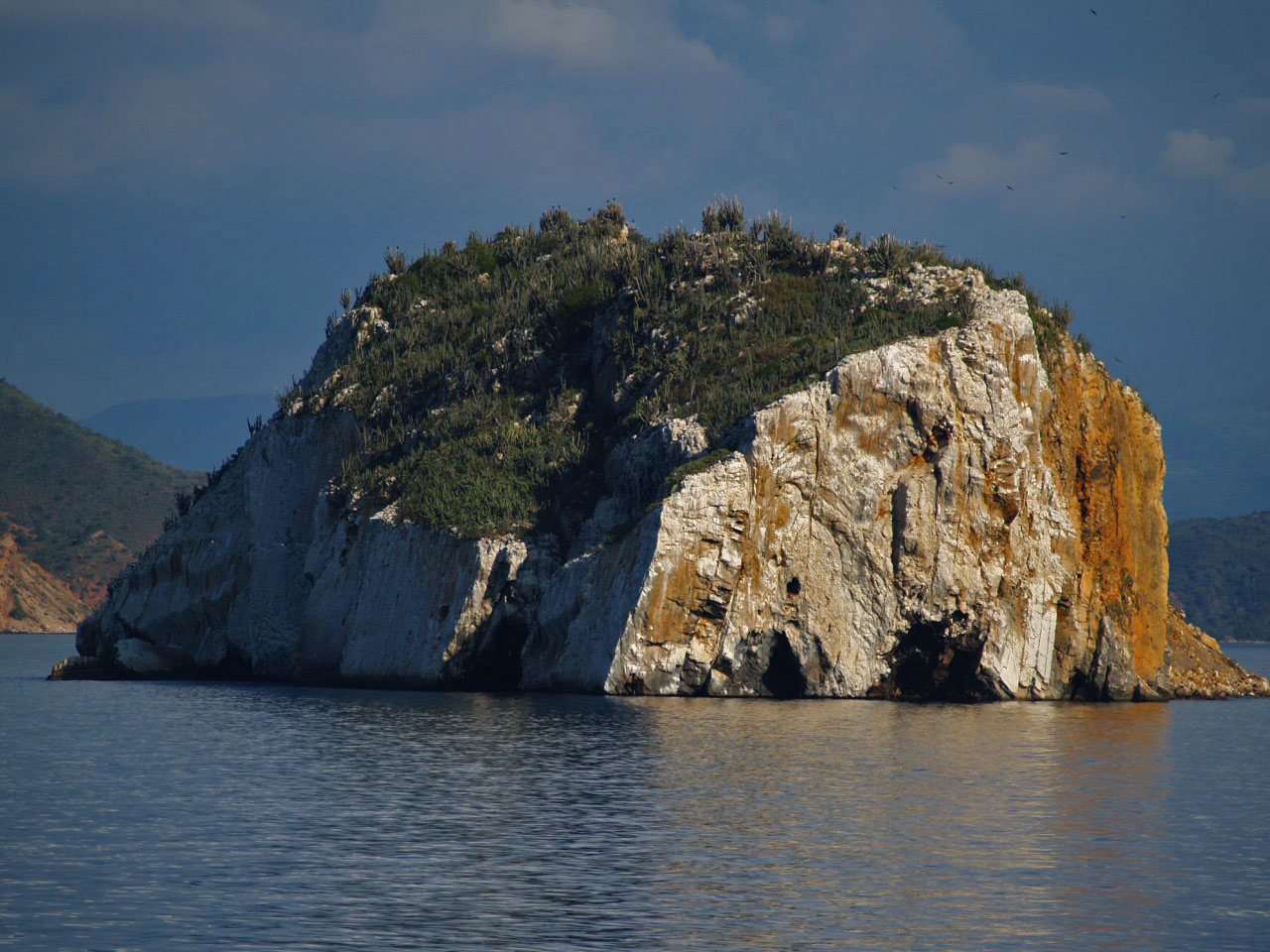

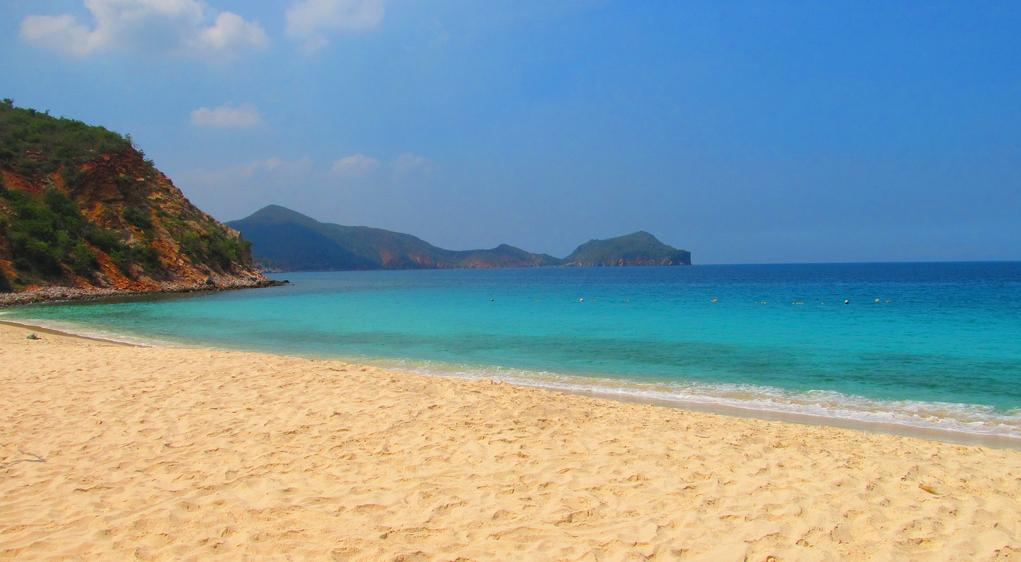

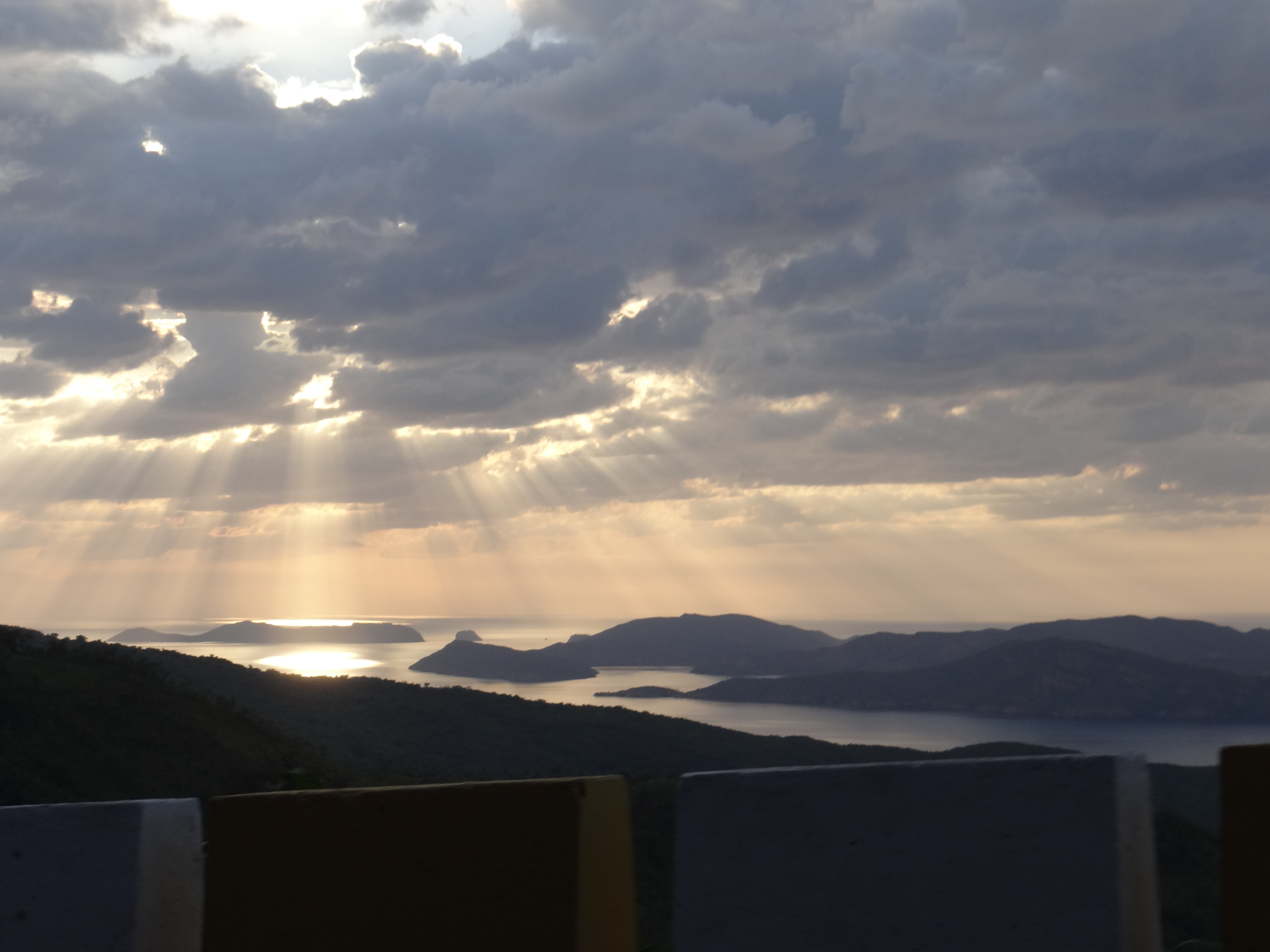

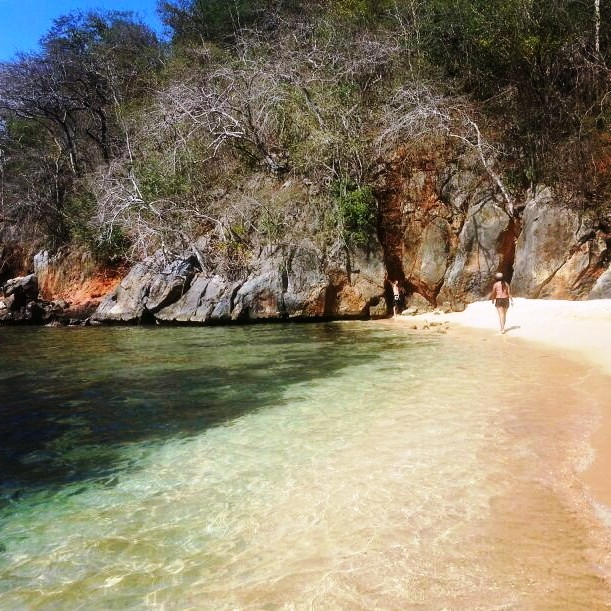

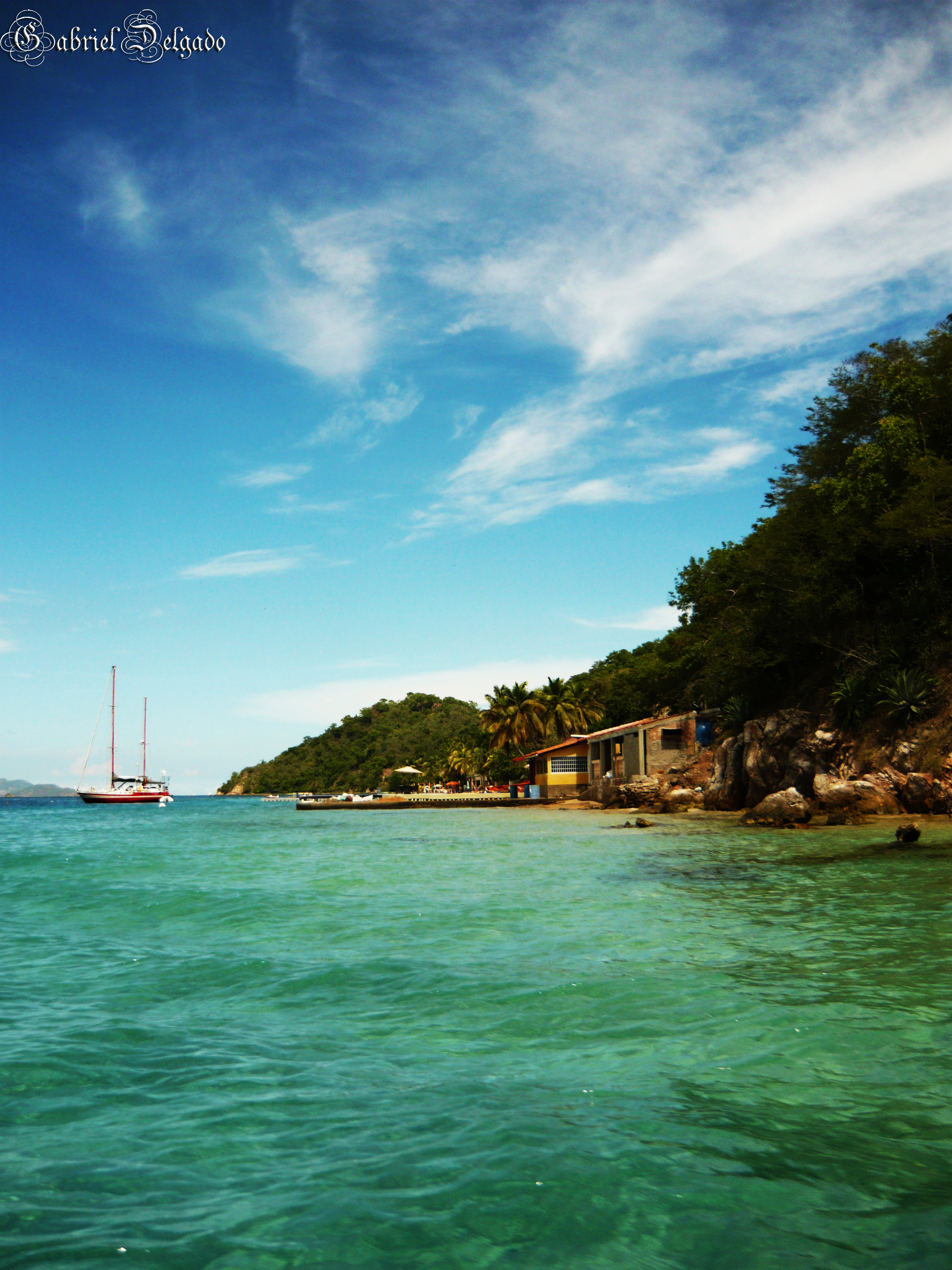

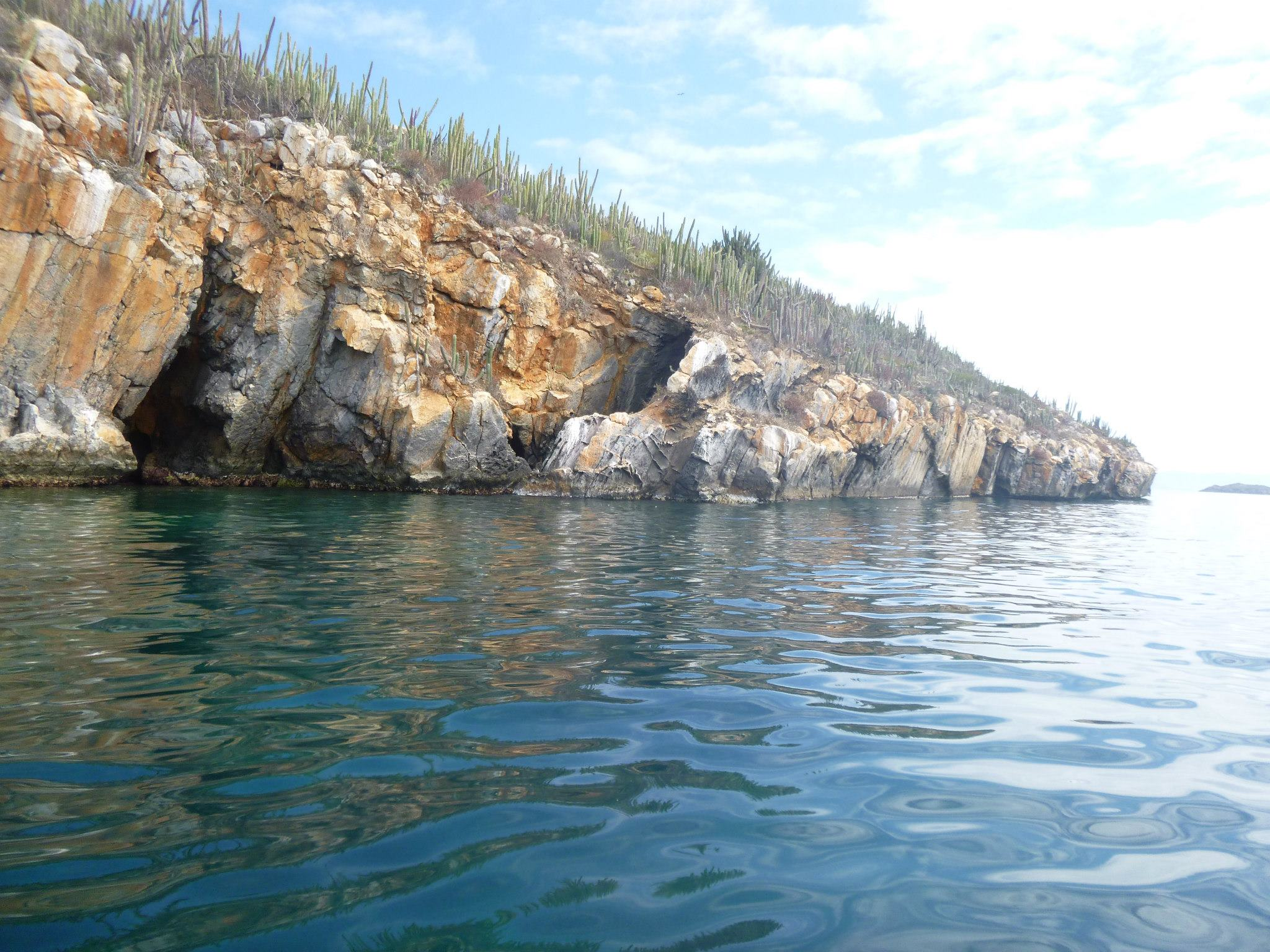

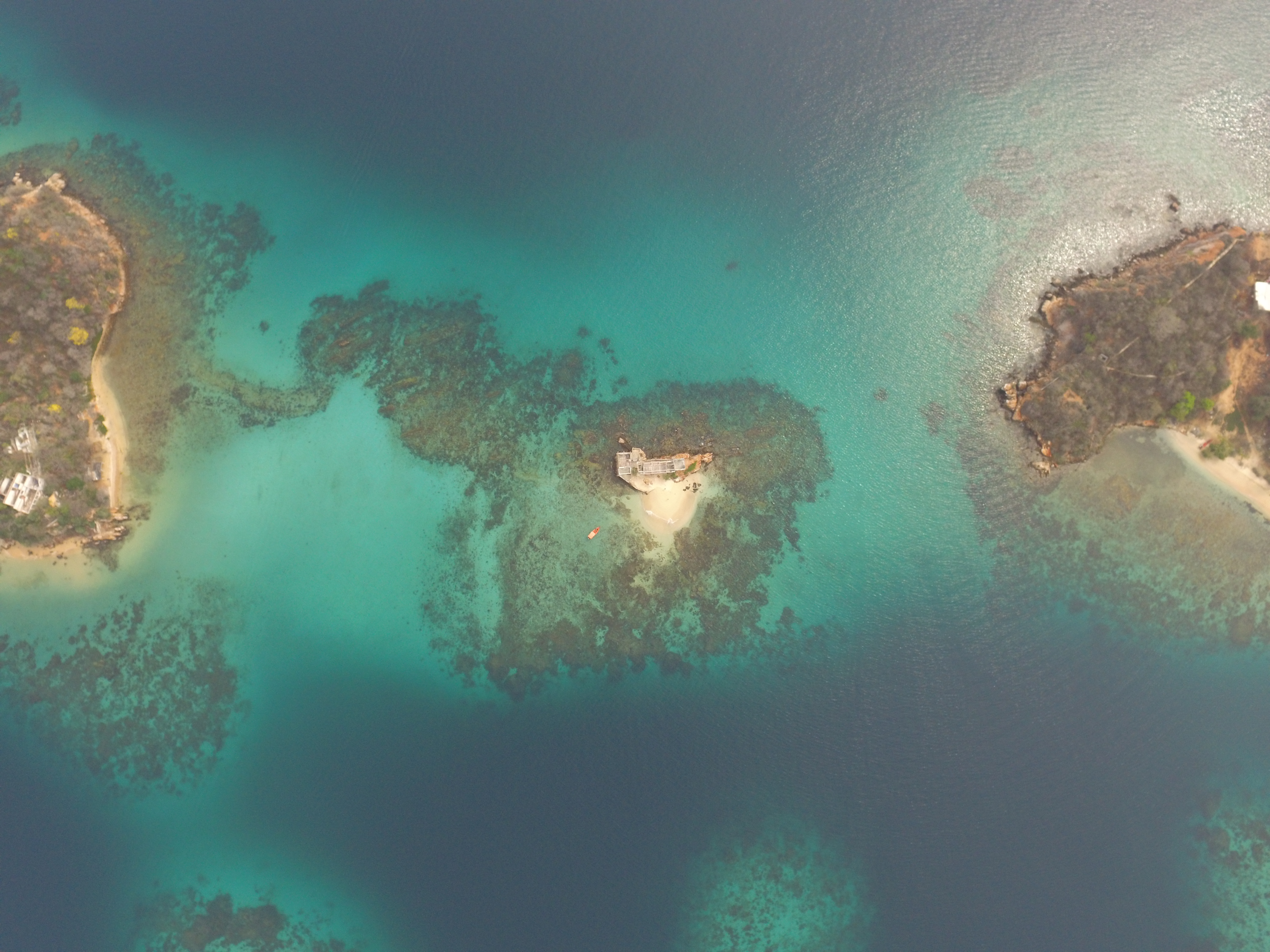

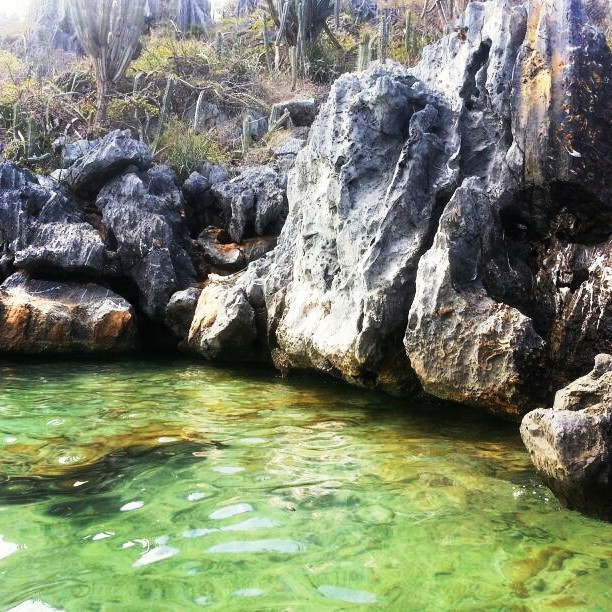
