= Juan Antonio Sotillo Municipality =

Juan Antonio Sotillo Municipality Municipio Juan Antonio Sotillo
- Municipality
- Flag Coat of arms

- Location in Anzoátegui

- Location in Venezuela
- Coordinates: 10°10′20″N 64°35′56″W
- Country: Venezuela
- State: Anzoátegui
- Municipal seat: Puerto La Cruz

Government
  - Mayor: Jesús Marcano Tabata (PSUV)

Area
  - Total: 245.1 km^{2} (94.6 sq mi)

Population (2011)
  - Total: 244,728
  - Density: 998.5/km^{2} (2,586/sq mi)
- Time zone: UTC−4 (VET)
- Area code(s): 0281

The Juan Antonio Sotillo Municipality is one of the 21 municipalities (municipios) that makes up the eastern Venezuelan state of Anzoátegui and, according to the 2011 census by the National Institute of Statistics of Venezuela, the municipality has a population of 244,728. The town of Puerto La Cruz is the shire town of the Juan Antonio Sotillo Municipality. The municipality is named for the nineteenth century Venezuelan military leader Juan Antonio Sotillo.

== History ==
The history of Puerto La Cruz began when the Spanish conquerors arrived to Venezuela. In 1780, the Christian Mission of Pozuelos (Pozuelos means small wells) was founded, with natives being the majority of the population.

On 9 April 1862, a group of 26 families from Margarita Island decided to settle in Pozuelos Bay.

The "Virgen del Amparo" (Virgin of Amparo) and the "Santa Cruz" (Holy Cross) were adopted as the main religious identities of the town. On 8 November of every year since then is celebrated as the "Dia de la Virgen del Amparo" (Day of the Virgin of Amparo) and 3 May as the "Dia de la Santa Cruz" (Day of the Holy Cross).

In 1868, the first Church was built and the name of the town was changed to Puerto de la Santa Cruz (Port of the Holy Cross), but as the years passed people got used to calling it just "Puerto La Cruz".

== Demographics ==
The Juan Antonio Sotillo Municipality, according to a 2007 population estimate by the National Institute of Statistics of Venezuela, has a population of 247,979 (up from 217,182 in 2000). This amounts to 16.8% of the state's population. The municipality's population density is 1,016.31 inhabitants per square kilometre (2,632.2/sq mi).

== Government ==
The mayor of the Juan Antonio Sotillo Municipality is former MLB player Magglio Ordóñez, elected on 8 December 2013 with 52% of the vote. He replaced Nelson Moreno Mierez shortly after the elections. The municipality is divided into two parishes; Capital Puerto La Cruz and Pozuelos.

== See also ==
- Idalba de Almeida
