= Puerto La Cruz =

- City
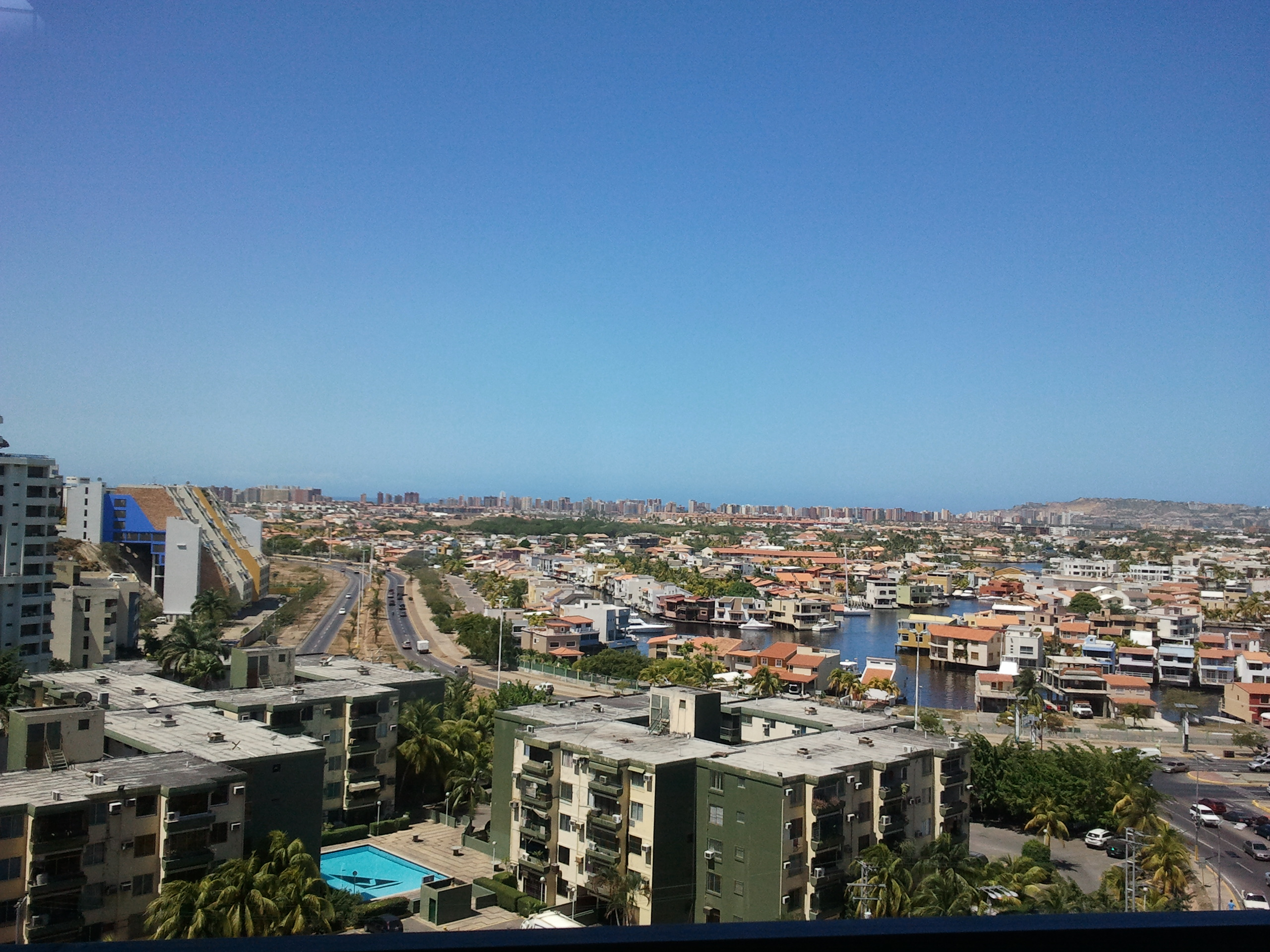
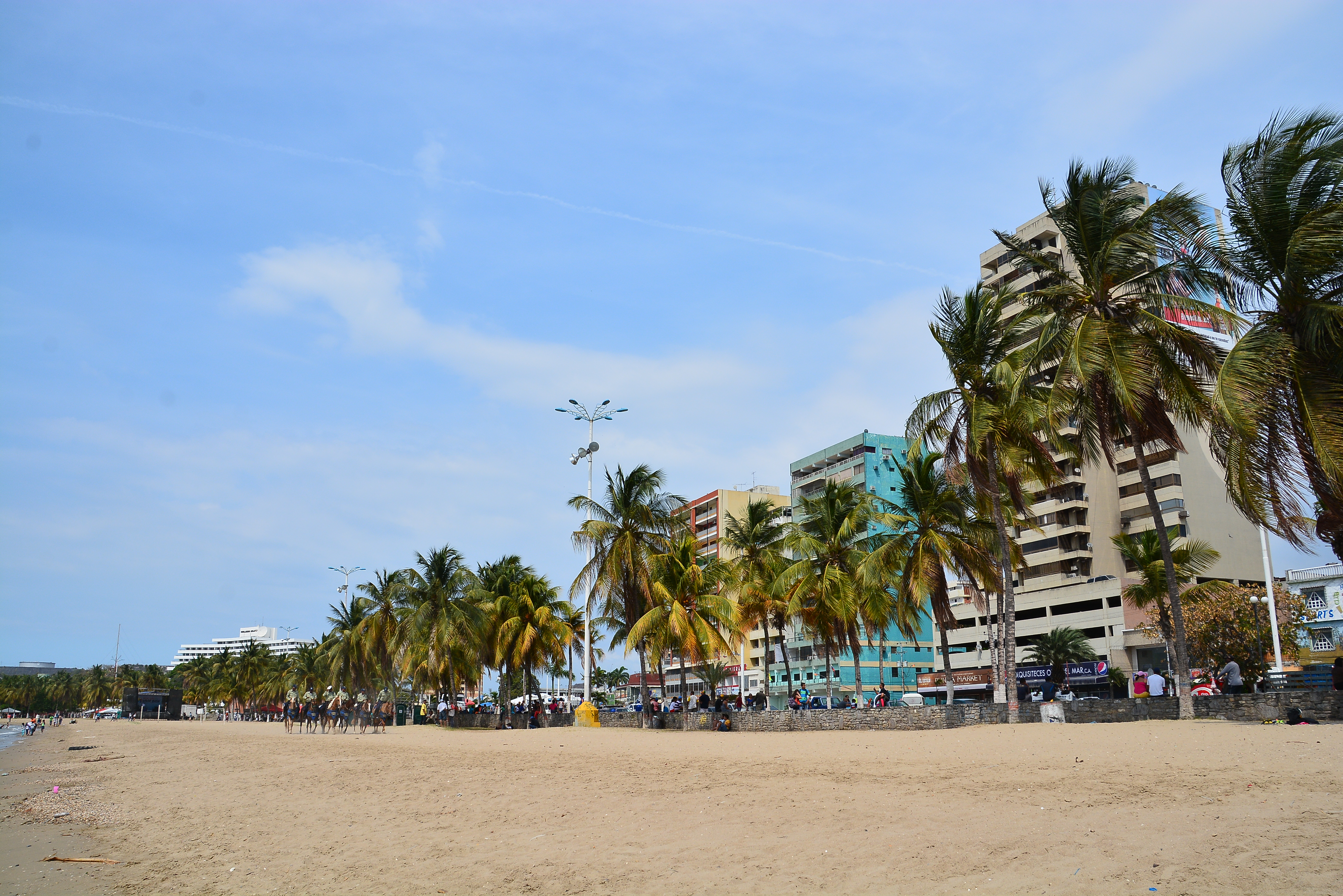
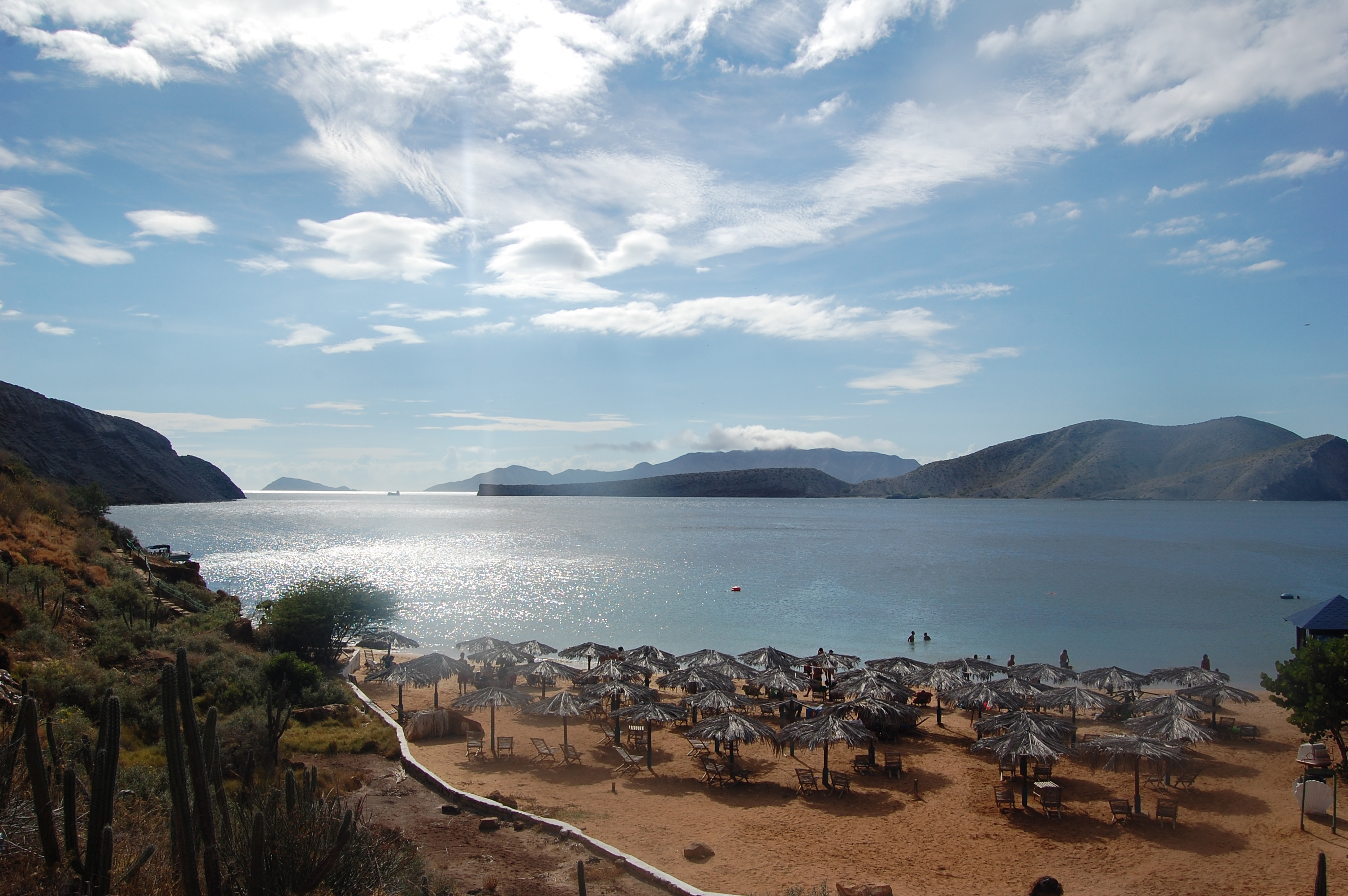
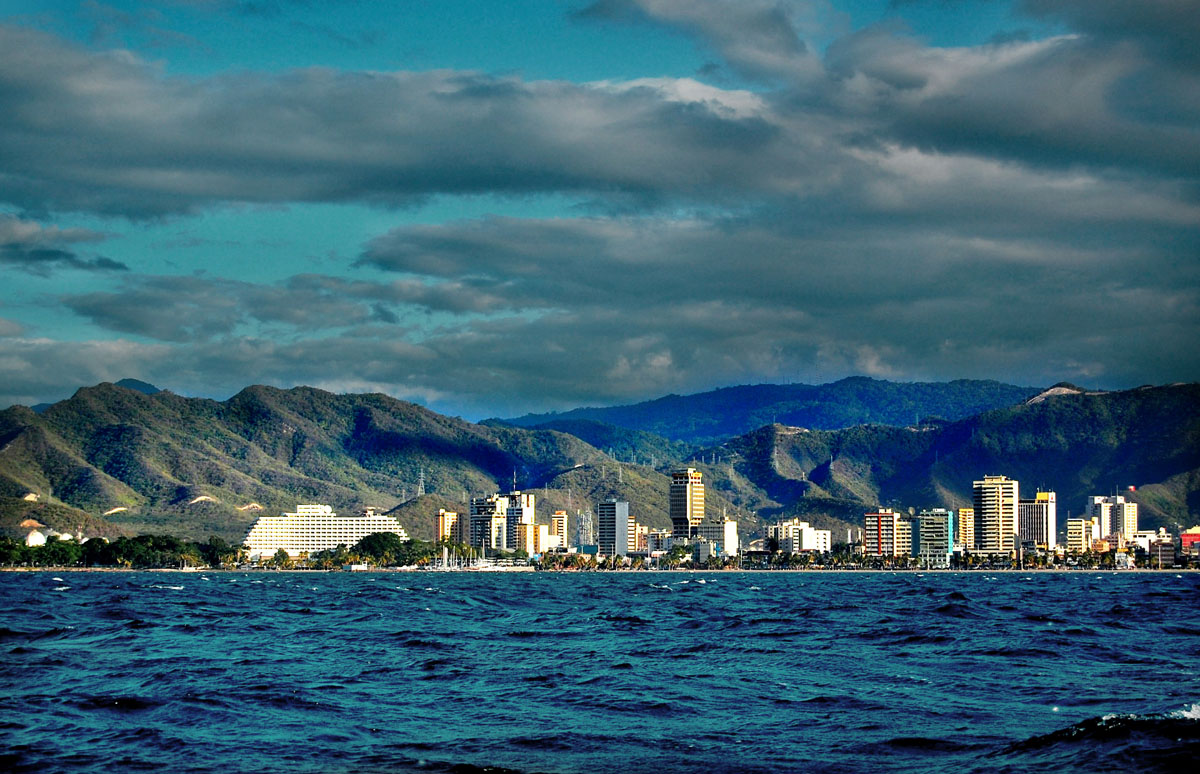
- Top: Panoramic view of Lechería and Las Villes area. Middle: Paseo Colon Beach and El Saco Beach. Bottom: Panoramic view of downtown Urbani Sacion, from El Saco Beach.

- Flag Coat of arms

- Location within Venezuela Location within the Caribbean
- Coordinates: 10°12′0″N 64°38′0″W
- Country: Venezuela
- State: Anzoátegui
- Municipality: Juan Antonio Sotillo
- Founded: 1862

Area
  - Total: 244 km^{2} (94 sq mi)
- Elevation: 10 m (33 ft)

Population (2019)
  - Total: 299,500
  - Density: 1,230/km^{2} (3,180/sq mi)
- Demonym: Portocruzano/a
- Time zone: UTC−4 (VET)
- Postal code: 6023
- Area code: 0281
- Climate: BSh

Puerto La Cruz (Spanish pronunciation: [ˈpweɾto la ˈkɾus]) is a port city located in Anzoátegui State, in Venezuela. It is the seat of the Juan Antonio Sotillo Municipality. The city has road connections to the state capital, Barcelona, to Lecheria and to Guanta.

== Geography ==
The city of Puerto La Cruz is located on the southern shore of the Caribbean. The elevation of the city varies between 767 and 64 metres (2,516 and 210 ft). The city position is at Latitude 10° 13' N and Longitude 64° 37' W. Typical temperatures vary between 25–28 °C (77–82 °F). Borders are represented by Mochima National Park, the North Eastern region, and the Coastal Mountains.

== History ==
The history of this settlement began with the arrival of the Spanish to the northern coast of what would eventually become Venezuela.

In 1780, the Christian Mission of Pozuelos (English: small wells) was founded by indigenous natives.

On 9 April 1862, a group of 26 families from Margarita Island decided to settle in Pozuelos Bay. As time progressed, this settlement adopted the Virgen del Amparo (English: Virgin of Amparo) and the Holy Cross (Spanish: Santa Cruz) as their religious symbols, celebrating their patron saint on 8 November (Spanish: Dia de la Virgen del Amparo) and iconography on 3 May (Spanish: Dia de la Santa Cruz).

By 1868, the first church was built, and slowly the name of the town was changed to Puerto de la Santa Cruz (English: Port of the Holy Cross), later shortened to Puerto La Cruz.

== Economy ==
Puerto La Cruz was the most important concentration of oil facilities in Eastern Venezuela beginning with the laying of a pipeline from the prolific Oficina field of the Mene Grande Oil Company (Gulf Oil) in 1939, The Creole Petroleum Corporation's (Standard Oil of New Jersey) pipeline from their Jusepin field was completed in 1945. Socony-Vacuum built a line in 1947. Mene Grande Oil and the Venezuelan subsidiary of Sinclair Oil each built a refinery in 1950.

Puerto La Cruz is home to Puerto La Cruz refinery, one of the largest oil refineries in the country, which, with its 200,000 barrels (32,000 m^{3}) per day processing capacity, supplies the domestic market and exports to other Caribbean countries such as Cuba and the Antilles. Also, at 50 kilometres (31 mi), the José Plant Complex is one of the primary processing facilities of the largest Venezuelan oil company, PDVSA and is a major refining hub for the crude extracted in the states of Monagas and Anzoátegui.

Puerto La Cruz is the terminus of the 145 km (90 mi) Carapito-Puerto la Cruz oil pipeline, the 155 km (96 mi) San Joaquin-Puerto la Cruz oil pipeline and the 184 km (114 mi) Anaco-Puerto la Cruz gas pipeline.

The city is the gateway to a large national park. The beaches of Mochima National Park surround the city. Places such as Isla de Plata, Playa Conoma, Isla Arapo and Playa Arapito are known for their beauty.

To the west of the city is the terminal of one of the main ferry lines linking Isla Margarita with the mainland, while to the east is a private marina that caters for tourists and visitors. Day trips are available to visit national park islands such as Playa El Faro, Los Chimanas, Cachicamo and Isla Borracha.

In addition to tourism, the major international banks have established their regional headquarters in the city. A large number of commercial businesses, and large shopping centers are progressively being developed.

== Transportation ==
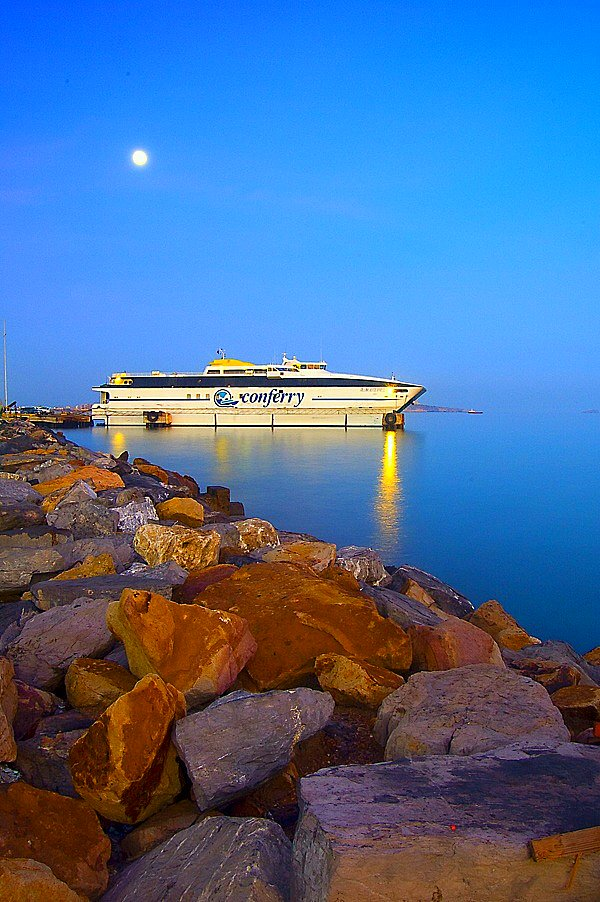
View of the Conferry of Puerto La Cruz.

Large avenues cross the city, from north to south, and from east to west. Among them are:

- Av. Municipal, which is the main avenue of the city, with two main traffic lanes and 2 service lanes in each direction, and was the first to be paved.
- Av. 5 Julio is the most popular avenue for trade; most shops are owned by immigrants of Arab descent.
- Av. Paseo Colon; almost all of this avenue borders the Bay of Pozuelos, which is one of the largest bays in the world. It has a boulevard where the symbol of the city of Puerto La Cruz (the Holy Cross) is situated. In addition here are established known hotels.
- Av. Bolivar, with a number of shops devoted to the sale of automotive spare parts, as well as car dealers. Paseo with Connects Miranda Av. Intercommunal Jorge Rodriguez (formerly Avenida Andres Bello), this avenue helps greatly to land transport.
- Prolongation Paseo Colon, is a branch of Av. Paseo Colon, starts from the sector Espigón, in front of the Razil Hotel, passes through the Sector El Paraiso, and onwards the Ave. Americo Vespusio to Lechería.

Puerto La Cruz has several ports from which many destinations, attractions, and shopping facilities can be reached. Margarita Island can be reached by the transport service operated by Conferry and Gran Cacique Express (which resumed its activities in December 2006). The beaches located on the islands of Mochima National Park may also be reached from Lechería.

In Guaraguao, Puerto La Cruz, there is also a terminal for the export/import of the crude oil processed at the city's refinery.

Puerto La Cruz does not have its own airport and uses Generál José Antonio Anzoátegui International Airport, in the nearby city of Barcelona.

== Mass transportation ==
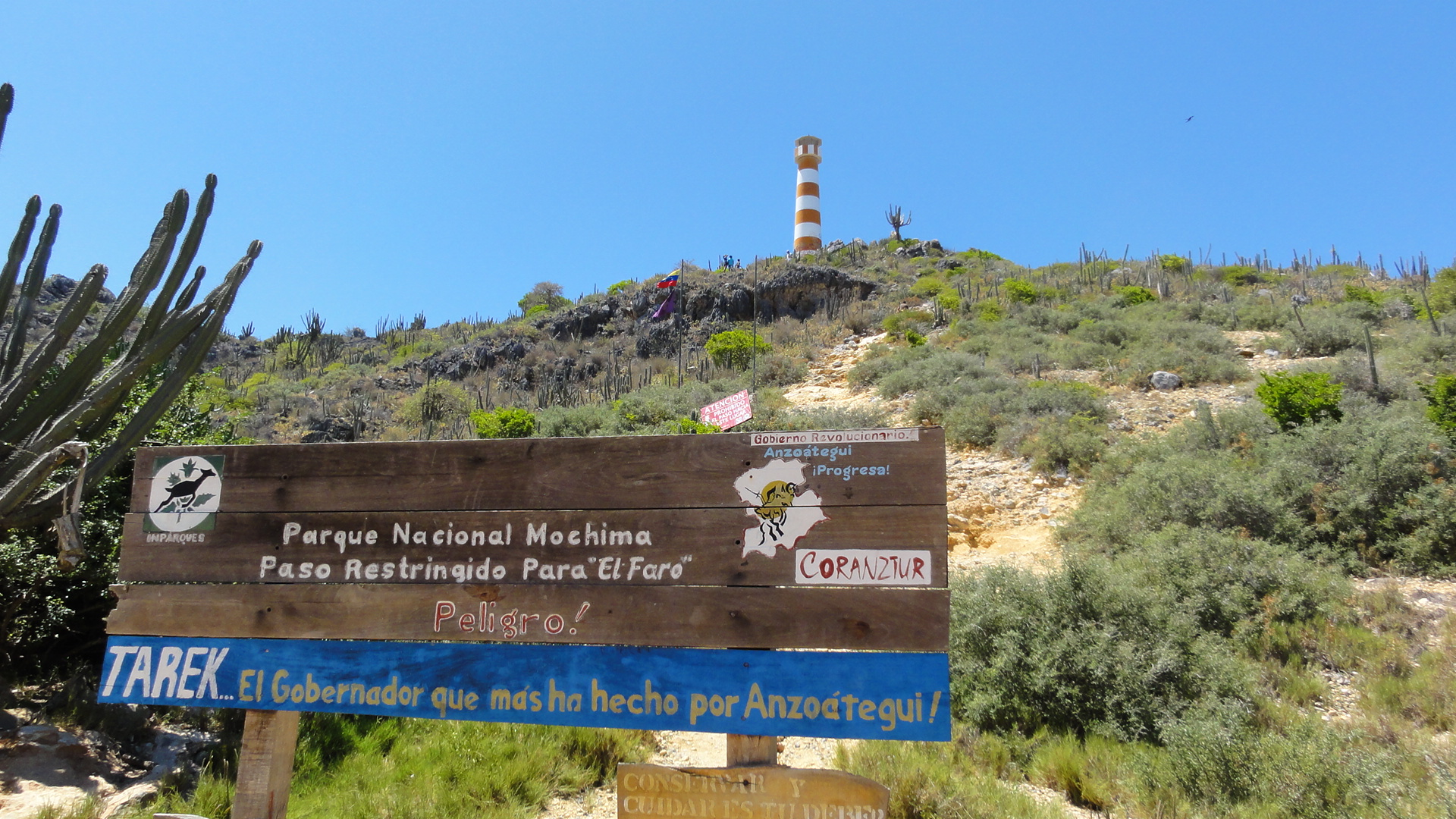
El Faro Island in the Mochima National Park

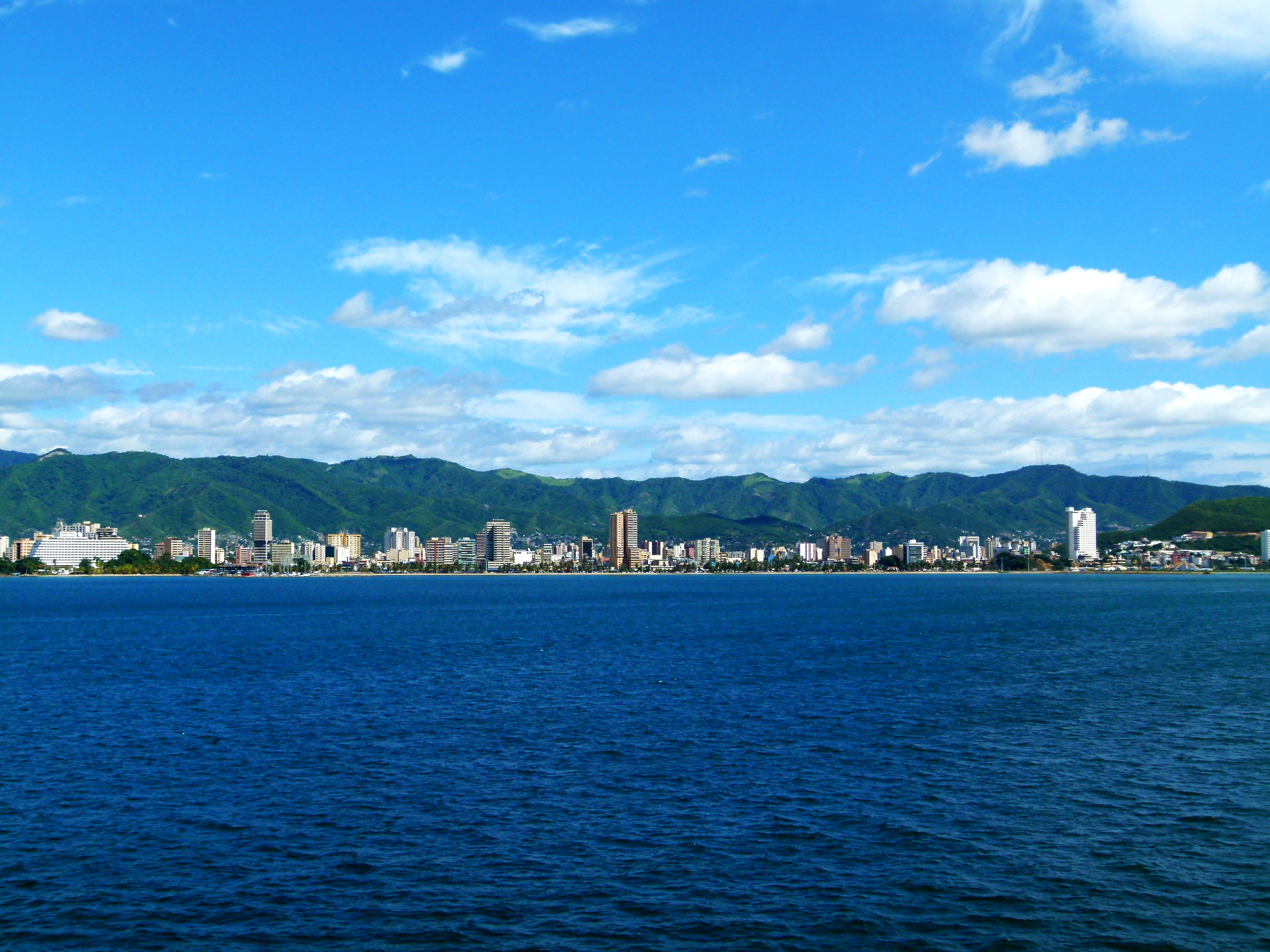
View of Puerto La Cruz from the Caribbean Sea

According to various sources, local authorities awaited the signature of President Hugo Chávez after negotiating an agreement between the mayors of Puerto La Cruz (Sotillo Municipality) and Barcelona (Bolivar Municipality) and the Chinese company Transtech Engineering Corporation for the construction of a network of modern mass transportation. The target date for the launch of this initiative was August 2007, but since the announcement in March of that year has not been re-appointed over the project.

The first phase of construction of the Metro urban network is expected to last approximately two years to complete. According to various estimates, this would reduce by 50% the volume of traffic that is logged daily in this metropolitan area. This ambitious project involves an air transport infrastructure, with additional sections on land.

== Places of interest ==
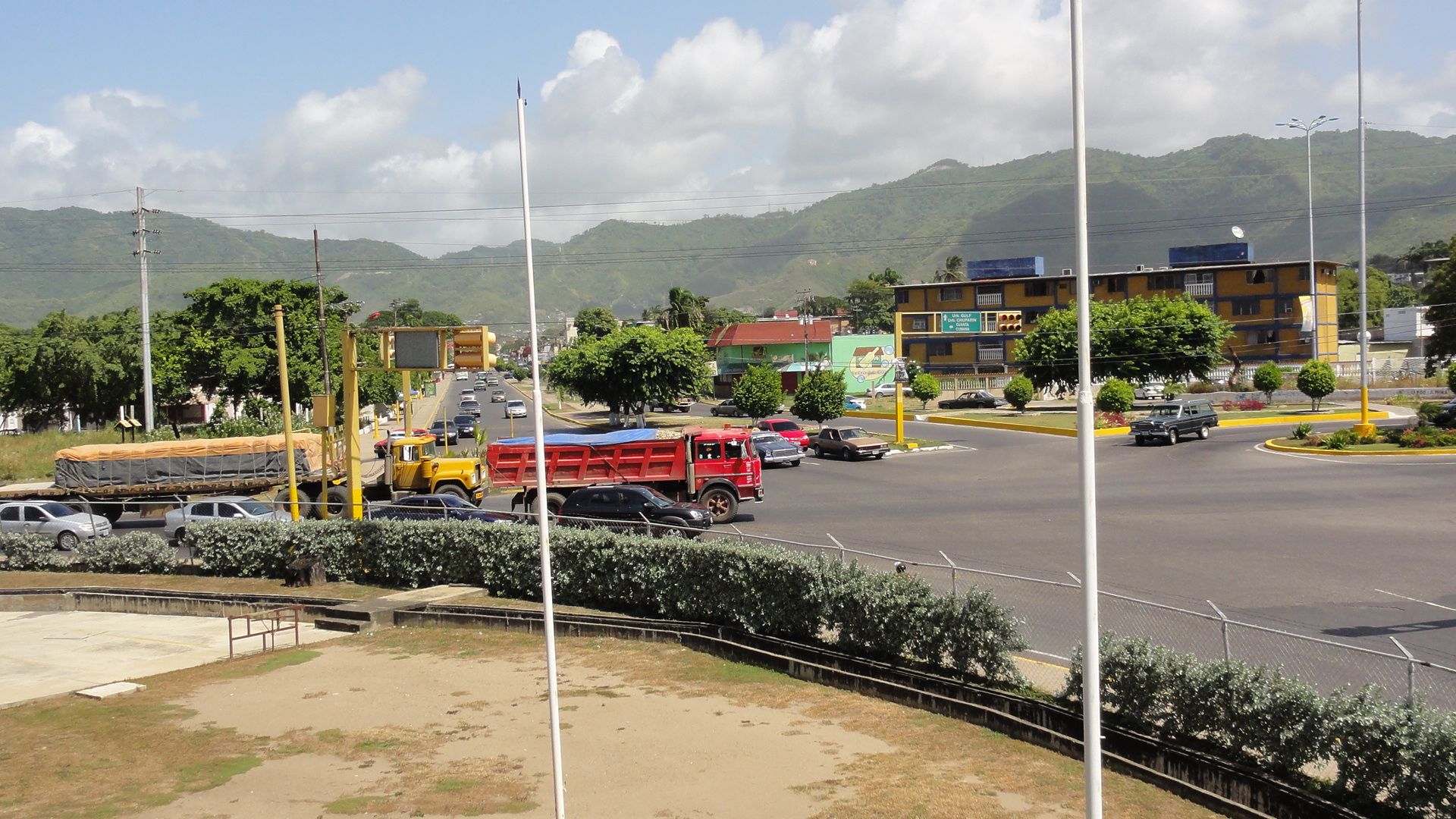
Chuparin Urbanization.

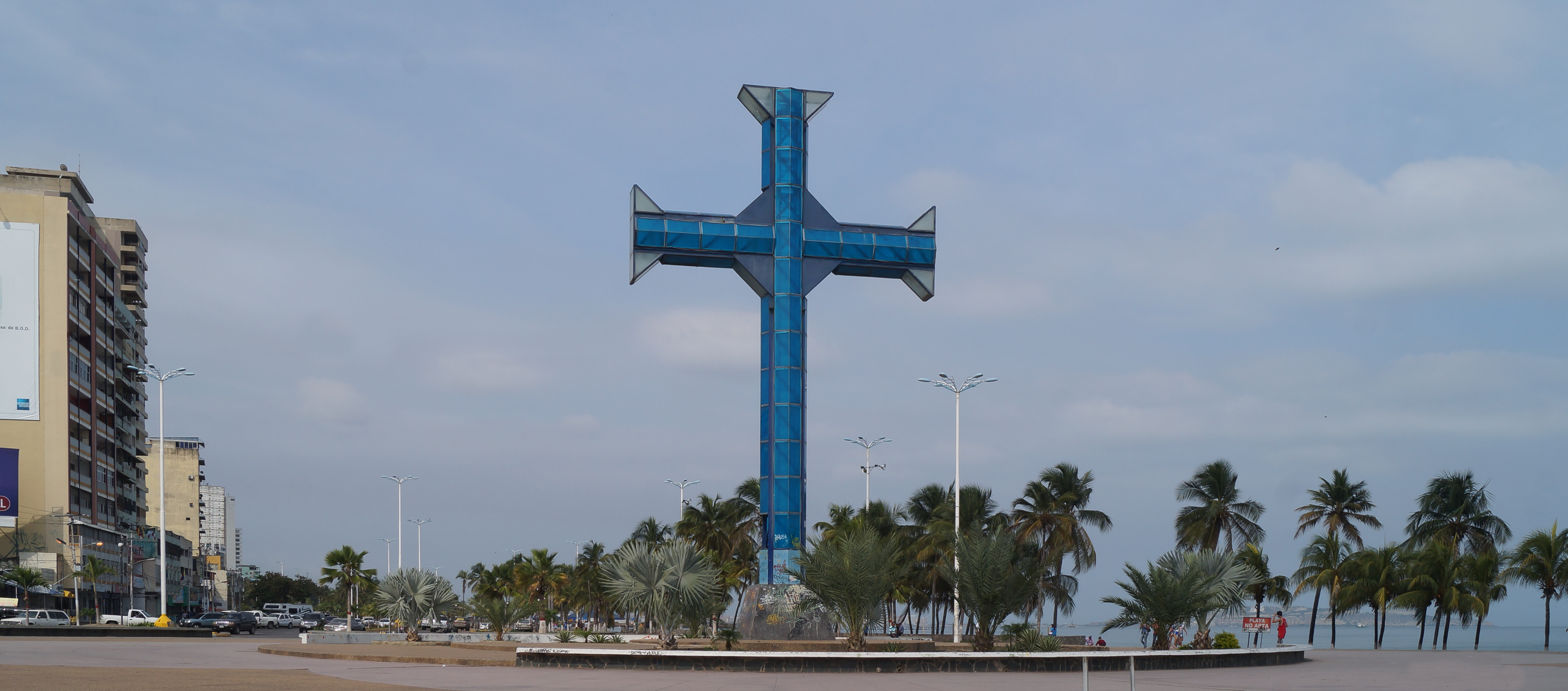
Cruz del Paseo Colón. A city landmark

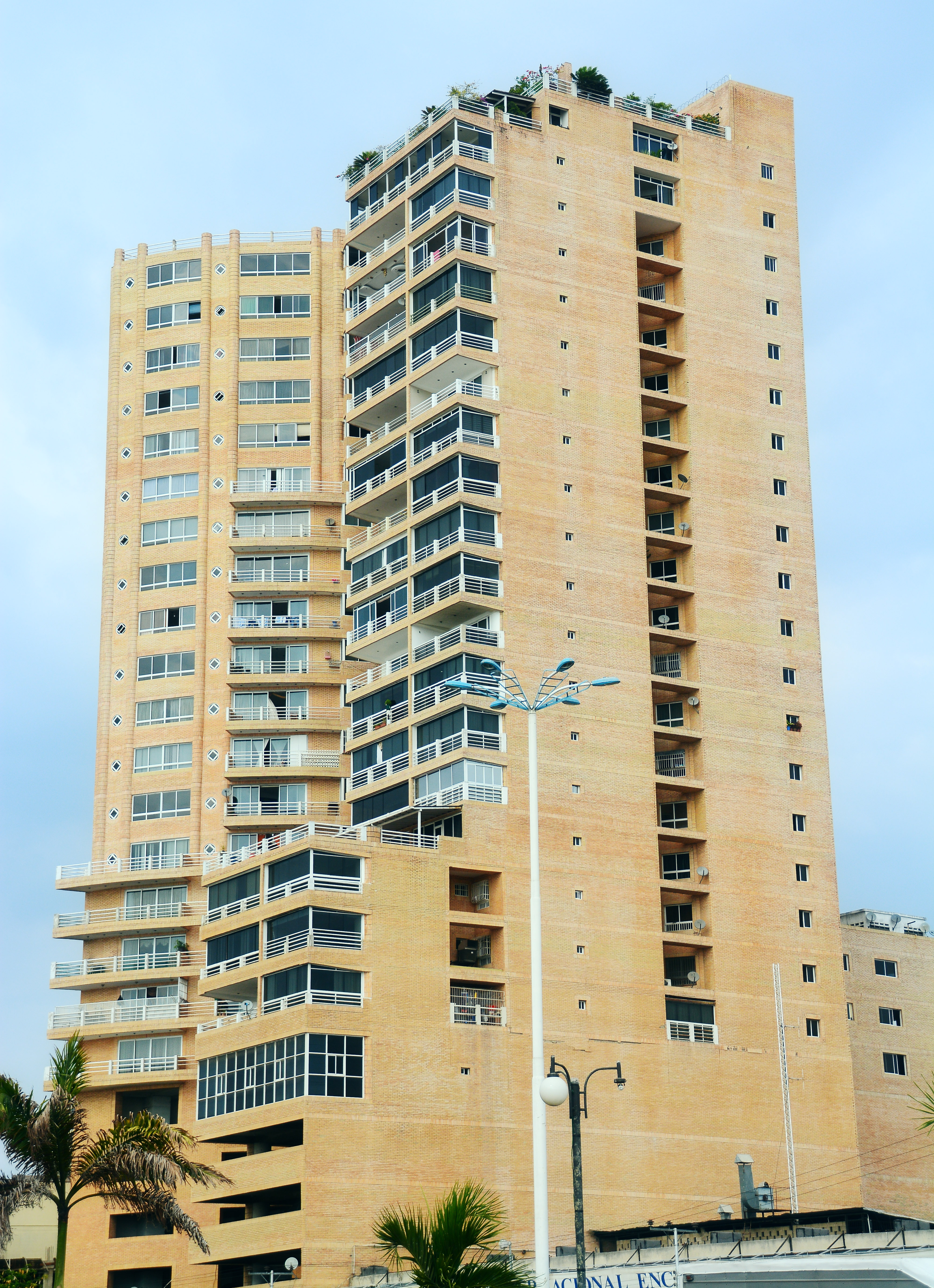
Galería Colón Tower

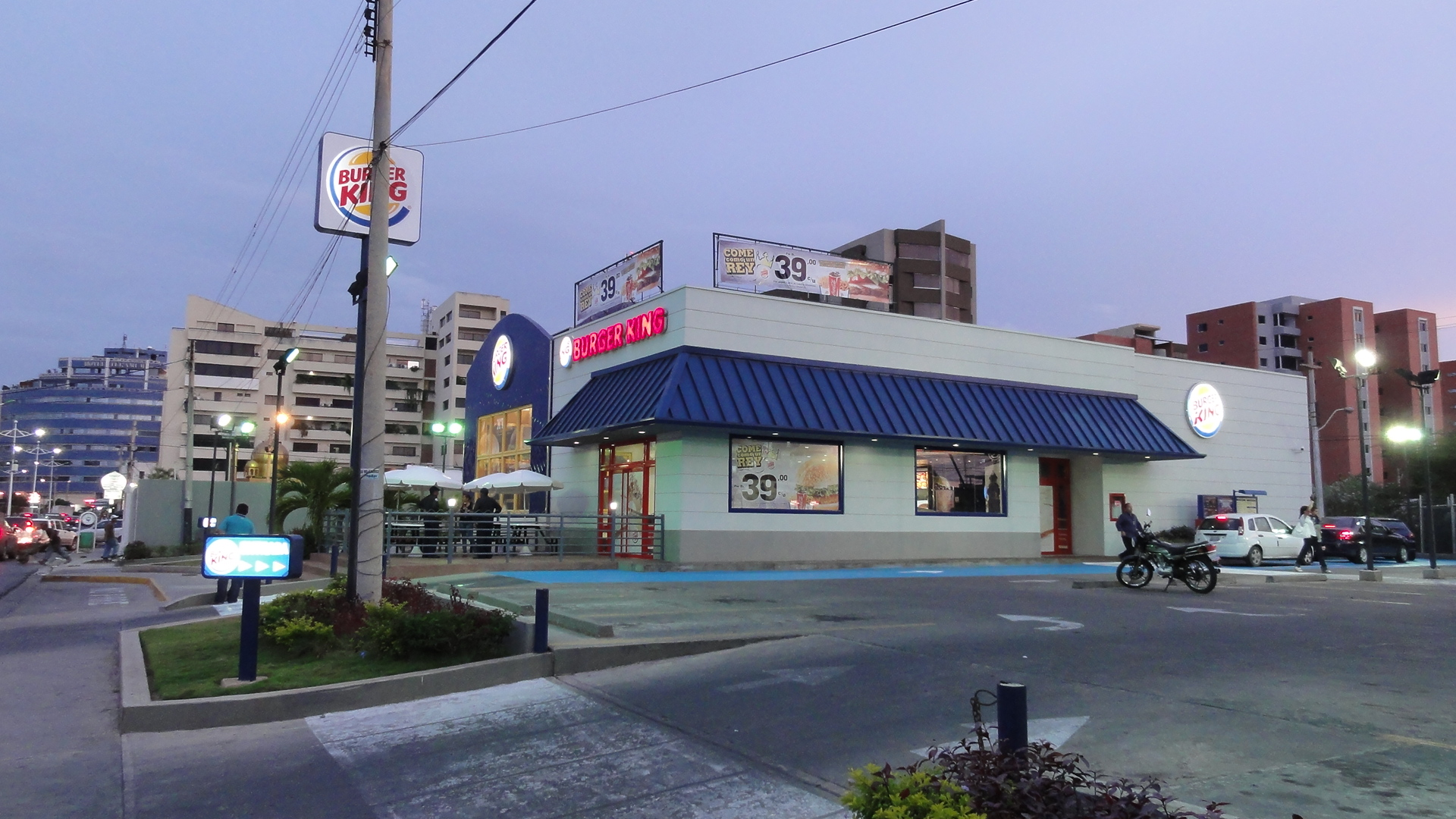
Street in Puerto la Cruz

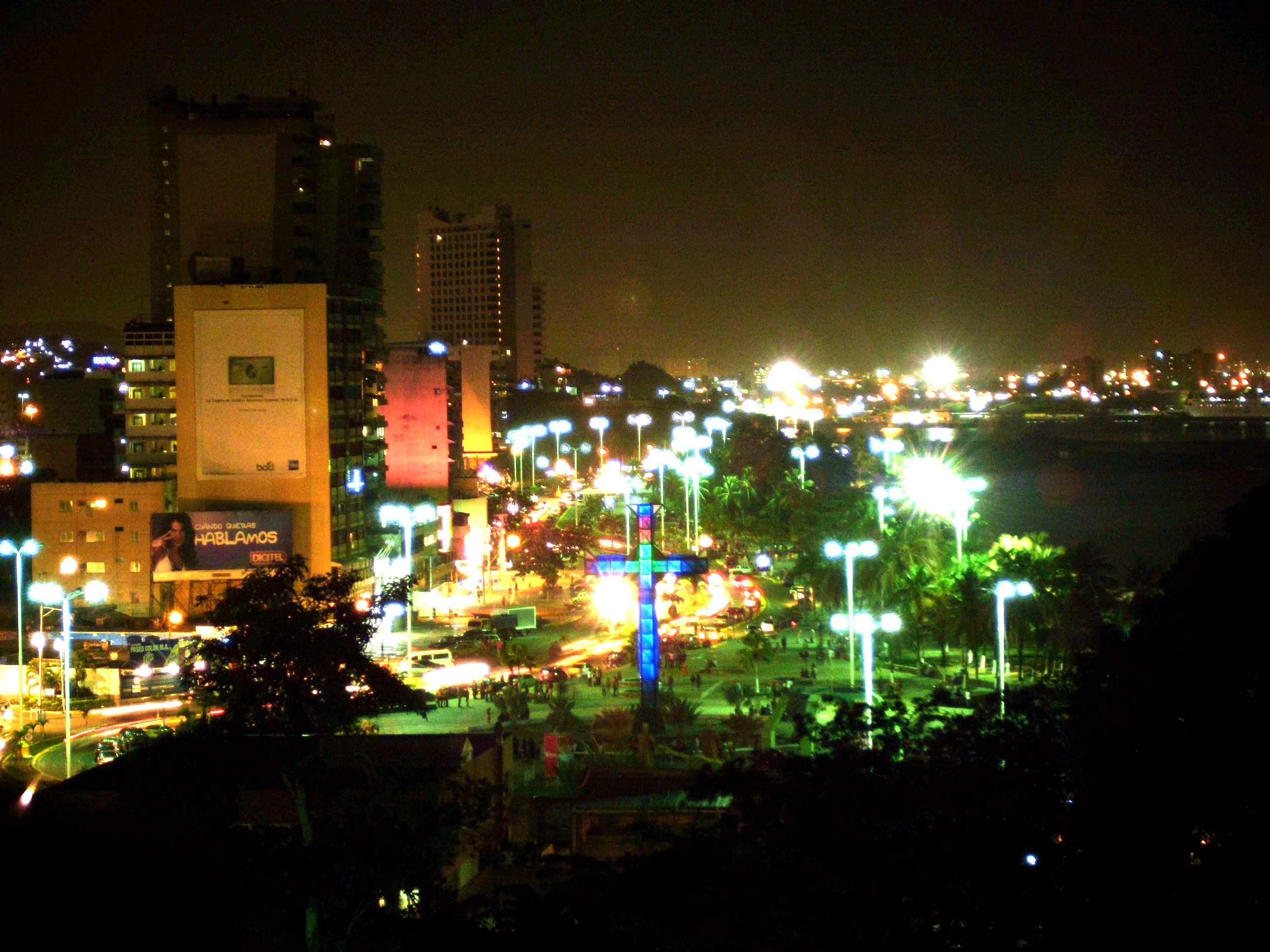
View of Puerto La Cruz at night

- Paseo Colon
- Andres Eloy Blanco Park
- La Toma, San Diego Sector
- The Laguna Natural Maguey
- Club Terminal Guaraguao

== Education ==
In the city there are various universities, institutes and colleges, among which are the following:

Universities

- UDO Universidad de Oriente, Nucleus Anzoátegui Av. Argimiro Gabaldon. Barcelona (Public)
- UGMA University Grand Marshal of Ayacucho. Barcelona (Headquarters)
- UNIMET Metropolitan University (Graduate Studies)
- IUPSM Polytechnic Institute "Santiago Mariño." Barcelona (Headquarters)
- USM University of Santa Maria (Nucleus East). Barcelona

Institutes

- Institute of Technology Jose Antonio Anzoátegui. (Public).
- University Institute of Technology (IUTA) with 2 locations: Barcelona and Puerto La Cruz. (Private).
- Institute Monsignor Arias Blanco. (Private).
- Instituto Universitario Pedro Maria Freites. (Private).
- University Institute of Technology "Antonio José de Sucre" (Private)
- University Institute of Technology "Rodolfo Loera Arismendi" (Private).

Schools and Colleges

- College Juan Crisostomo Falcon
- Carmen Mary College
- College Miguel Otero Silva
- Salesian College Pius XII
- Basic School Great Liberator
- L.B Mercedes de Pérez Freites
- U.E Angel Mottola
- U.E.C Antonio Maria Claret
- U.E. Dr. Cristóbal Mendoza
- U.E General Isaias Medina Angarita
- U.E College Laura Vicuna
- U.E Strings Down
- U.E Alcazar's Neveri
- U.E Bolivarian Guaraguao
- U.E Colegio Italo Venezolano, Angelo Marta
- U.E Colegio Santa Teresita.
- U.E From Jean-Jacques Rousseau Integral Support
- Dr U.E. Raúl Leoni
- U.E Eloy Guillermo Gonzalez
- U.E Eloy Palacios
- U.E Gual and Spain
- U.E Iberoamericana
- Experimental Institute U.E
- U.E Jacinto Benavente
- U.E Juan Antonio Sotillo
- U.E Lights and Virtues
- U.E Mother Maria de San Jose
- U.E Manuel Placido Maneiro
- U.E Maria Montesorri
- U.E Martin Tovar & Tovar
- U.E Minerva
- U.E Our Lady of Fatima
- U.E Our Lady of Lourdes
- U.E Our Lady of Lourdes II
- U.E Romulo Gallegos
- U.E San Celestino
- U.E Liberator Simón Bolívar
- U.E Simon Rodriguez
- U.E Tomás Alfaro Calatrava
- U.E Virgen del Carmen
- U.E Carlos Soublette

International schools:

- Colegio Internacional de Puerto La Cruz (International School of Puerto La Cruz)
- Escuela Las Américas
- QSI International School of Puerto La Cruz in Lechería, previously the Escuela De Las Americas Puerto La Cruz, acquired by Quality Schools International in 2004. (CLOSED)

Spanish Language Schools

- Jakera Spanish School Playa Colorada

=== Gallery Images ===
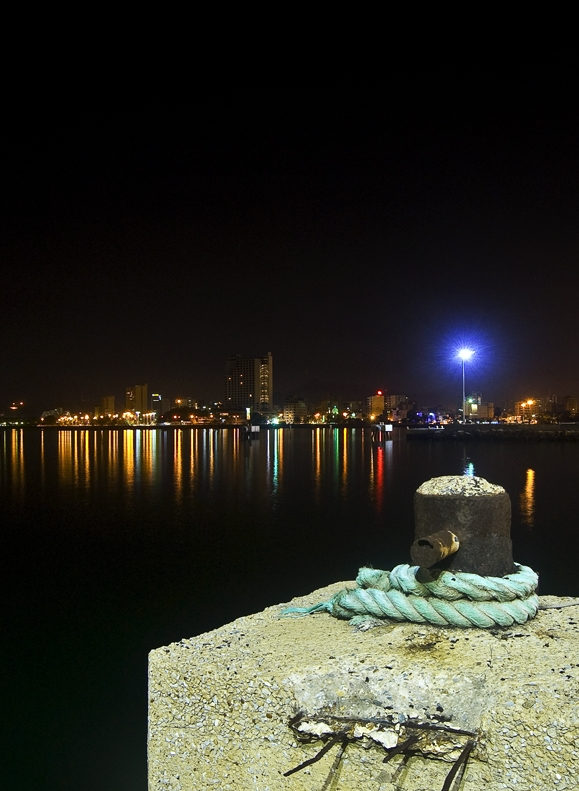
Puerto La Cruz at night

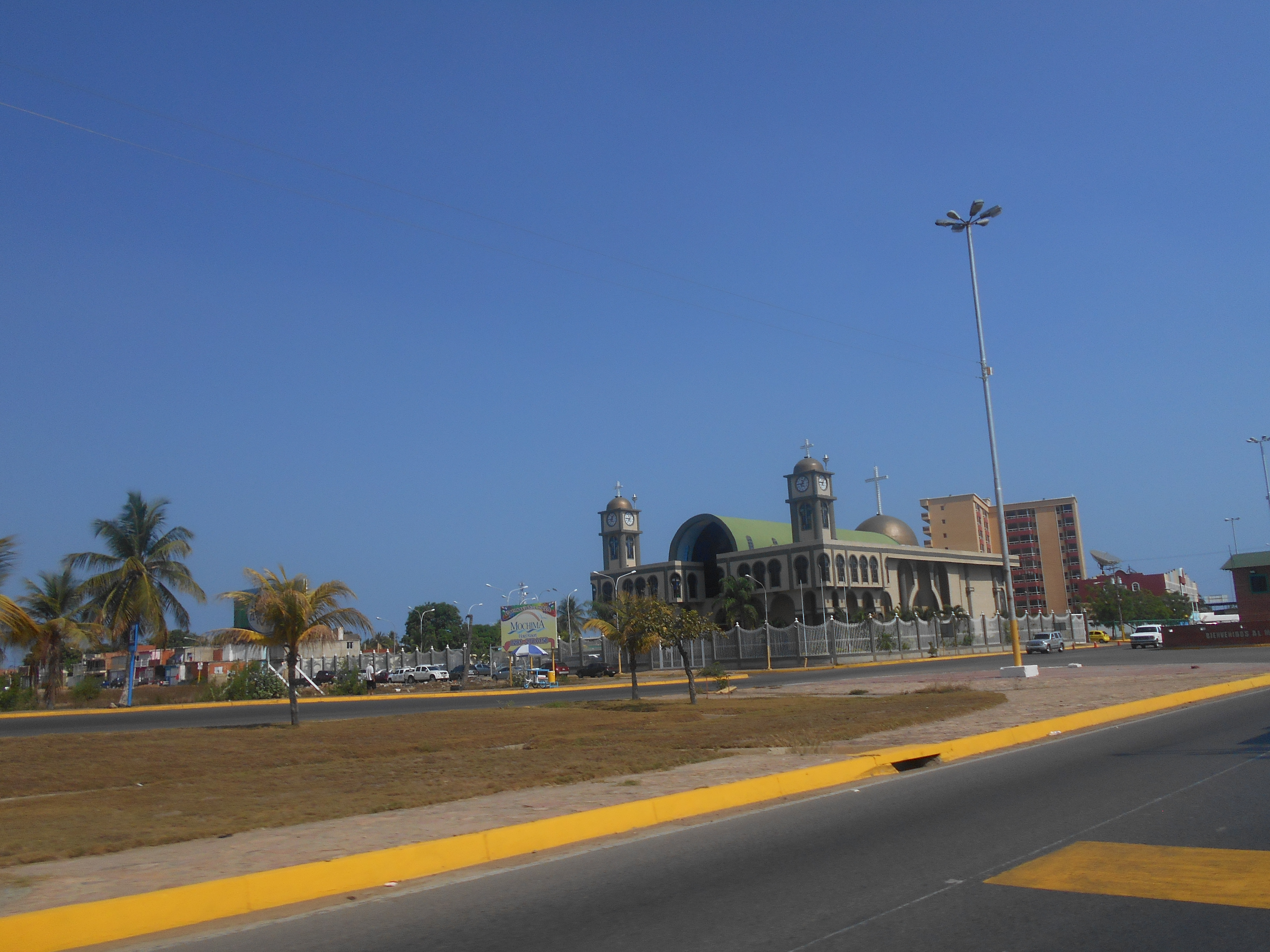
Avenue in Puerto La Cruz

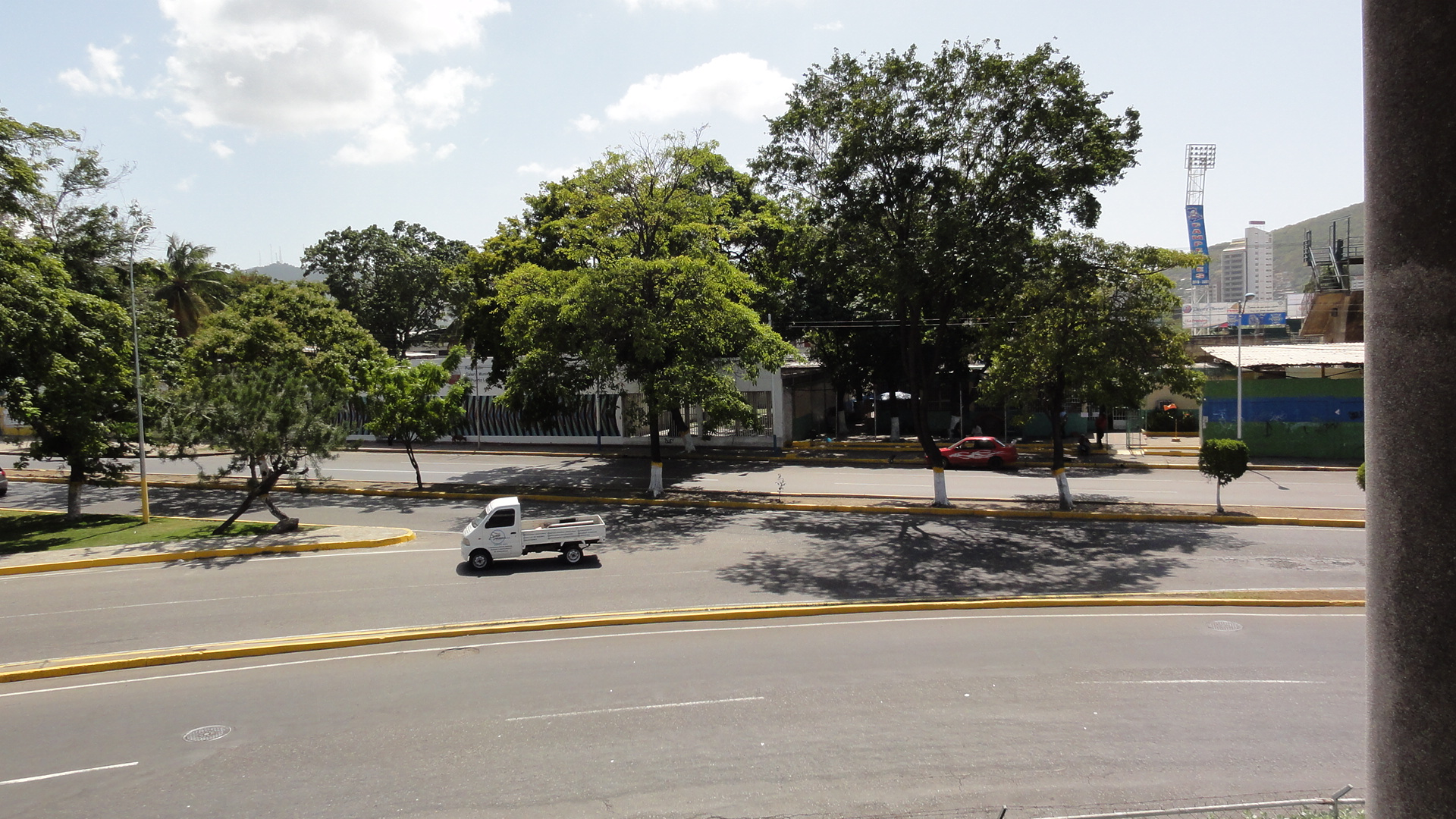
Barrio Mariño

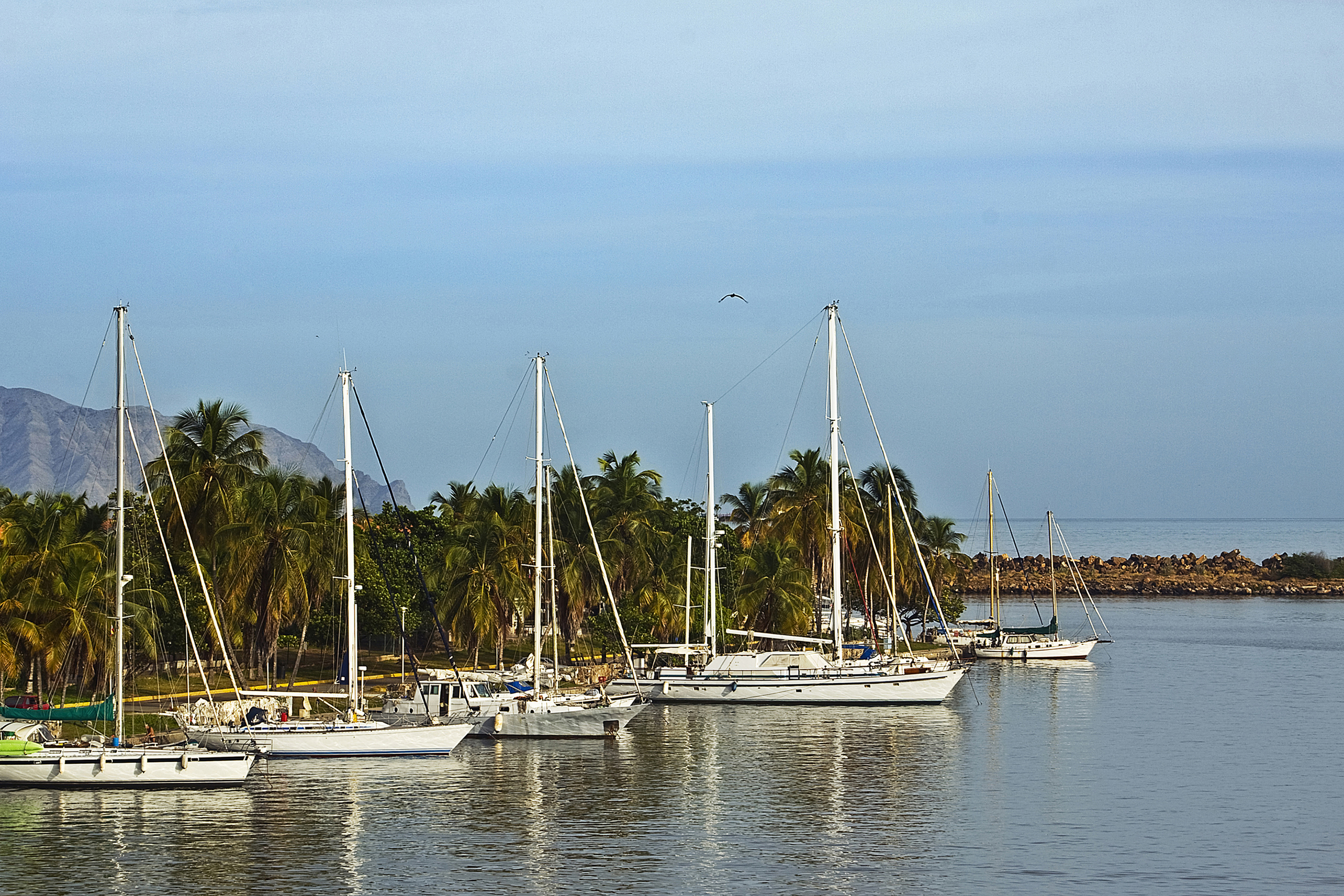
Puerto La Cruz Bay

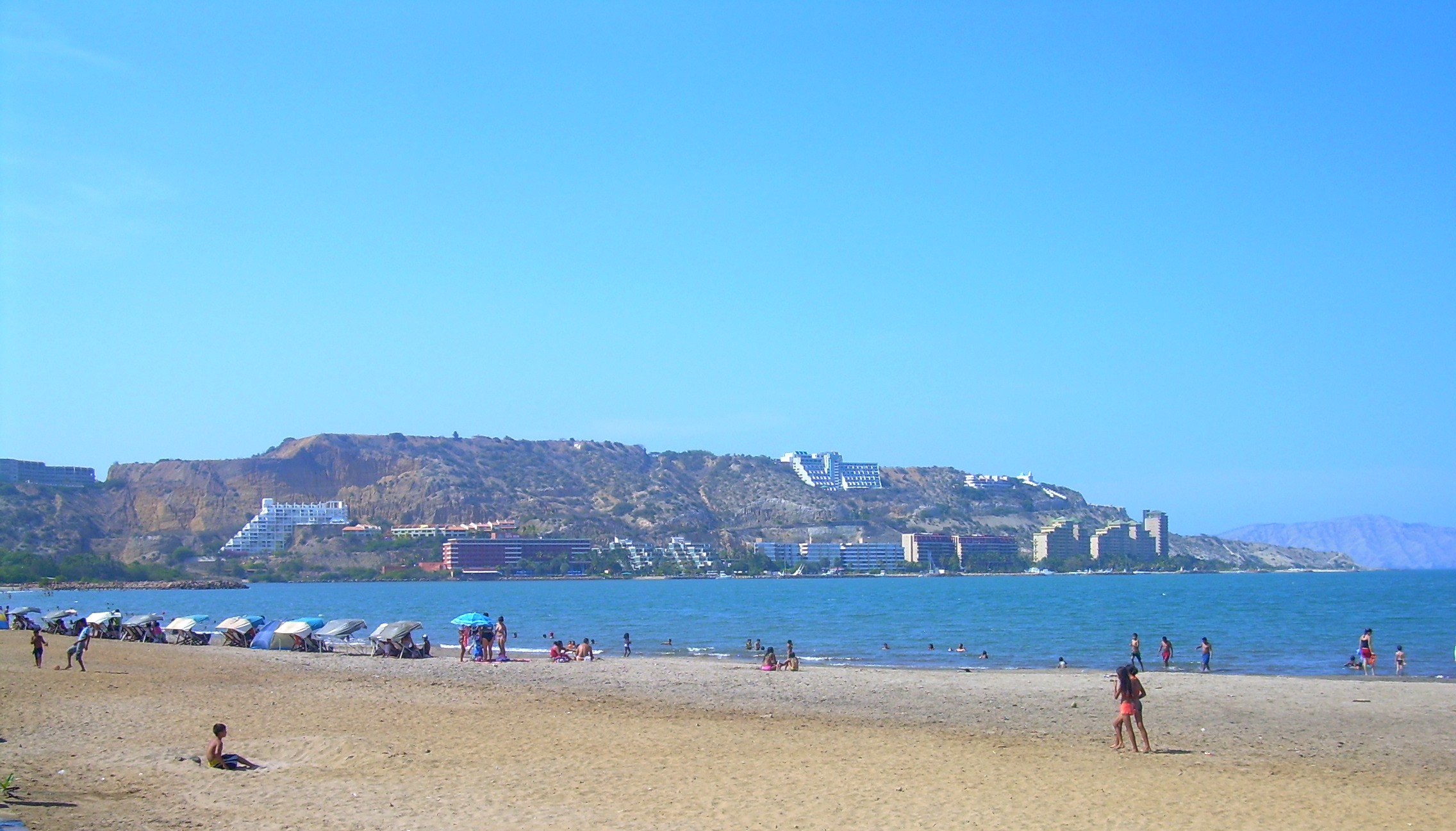
Beach in Puerto La Cruz

== Sports ==
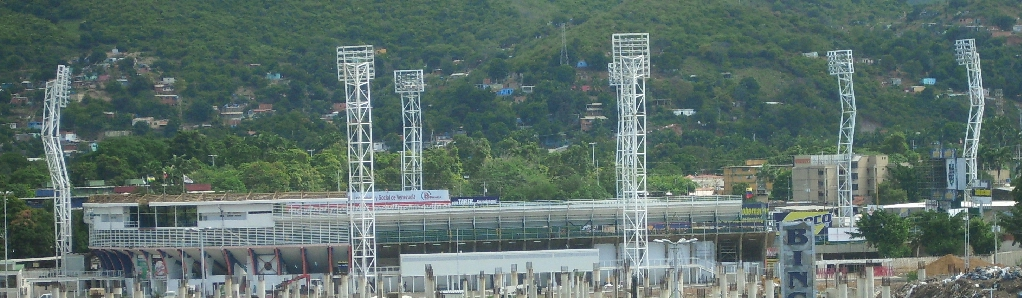
Alfonso Chico Carrasquel Stadium

Baseball

The city is the home of the baseball team Caribes de Anzoátegui (formerly known as Caribes de Oriente). The team plays at the Estadio Alfonso Chico Carrasquel, which has a capacity of 18,000 spectators.

Basketball

The city is also home to the professional basketball team Marinos de Anzoátegui (formerly known as Marinos de Oriente), which plays in the Polideportivo Simón Bolívar (formerly known as Polideportivo Luis Ramos), better known today as the Caldera del Diablo.

Football

The city has 2 football stadiums.

The Jose Antonio Anzoátegui stadium, with a capacity of 40,000 spectators, hosted some of the Copa América 2007 matches among teams from Brazil, Mexico, Chile and Ecuador. The stadium is the home ground of the football team Deportivo Anzoátegui, which plays in the First Division of Venezuela.

The other stadium, the Salvador de la Plaza stadium, hosts the football team Inter Anzoátegui, which plays in the Third Division.

Sports clubs

- Baseball: Caribes de Anzoátegui.
- Basketball: Marinos de Anzoátegui.
- Football: Deportivo Anzoátegui and Inter Anzoátegui

== Notable people ==
- Asdrúbal Cabrera – Baseball player
- Eliézer Alfonzo – Baseball player
- Freddy Guevara – Politician
- Edymar Martínez – Model and Miss International 2015
- Zdeněk Chovanec López – Racing driver
- Valentina Figuera – Model and Miss Grand International 2019

== Media ==
TV

- Televisora de Oriente "TVO"
- Puerto TV
- Anzoátegui TV
- OrbitAaTV
- Telecaribe

Radio

- La Mega de Puerto La Cruz 100.9
- Éxitos de Puerto La Cruz
- Ultra Estéreo de Puerto La Cruz
- CNB de Puerto La Cruz 93.7
- Vértice de Puerto La Cruz
- Plaza
- Exitosa
- Actualidad 640 AM
- Lasser 97.7
- Caribe 102.7
- Marina 103.7
- Cielo
- News
- Rumbera 94.5
- Turística FM
- Radio Puerto La Cruz (760 am)
- Orbita 107.5 FM

Periodicals

- El Tiempo: Leading daily Anzoátegui State

It has two editions for Anzoátegui (North and Central-South) and one for the state of Sucre.

- El Norte
- La Nueva Prensa de Oriente
