= List of HSC ferry routes =

This is a list of high-speed craft ferry routes.

Many routes are operated by catamarans, as catamarans are a faster craft than a similar sized monohulls. In the 1990s monohull HSCs with capacity for cars and buses have taken over many routes.

== Catamarans ==
=== Europe ===
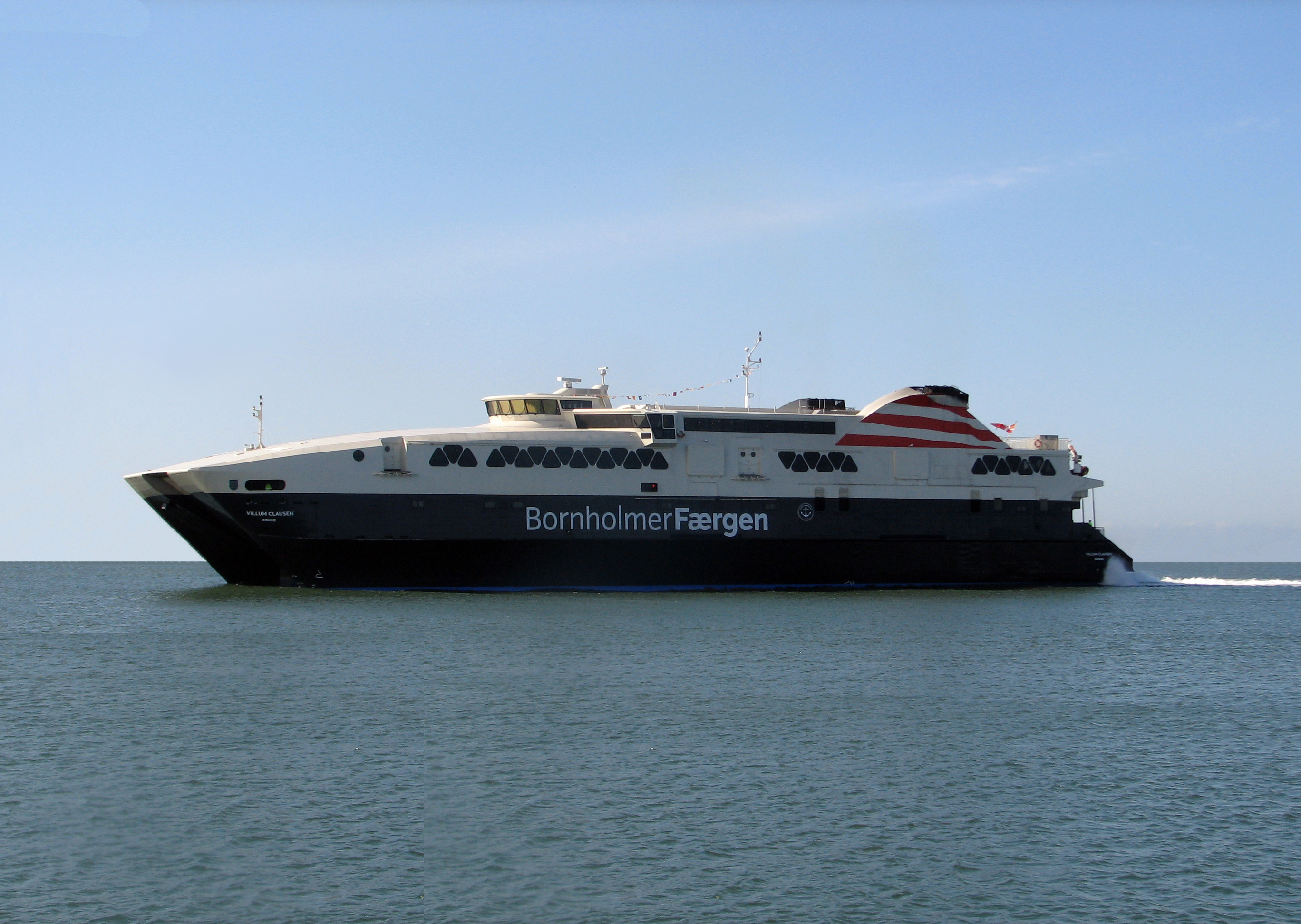
HSC Villum Clausen On the way from the shipyard of Austal in Australia to Rønne in Denmark the ferry had a top speed of 47.7 knots and an average of 43.4 knots, and on February 16 and 17, 2000 it had reached 1,063 sea miles within 24 hours, thereby setting the world record which was then written in the Guinness Book of Records. It is in service between Rønne in Denmark and Ystad in Sweden.

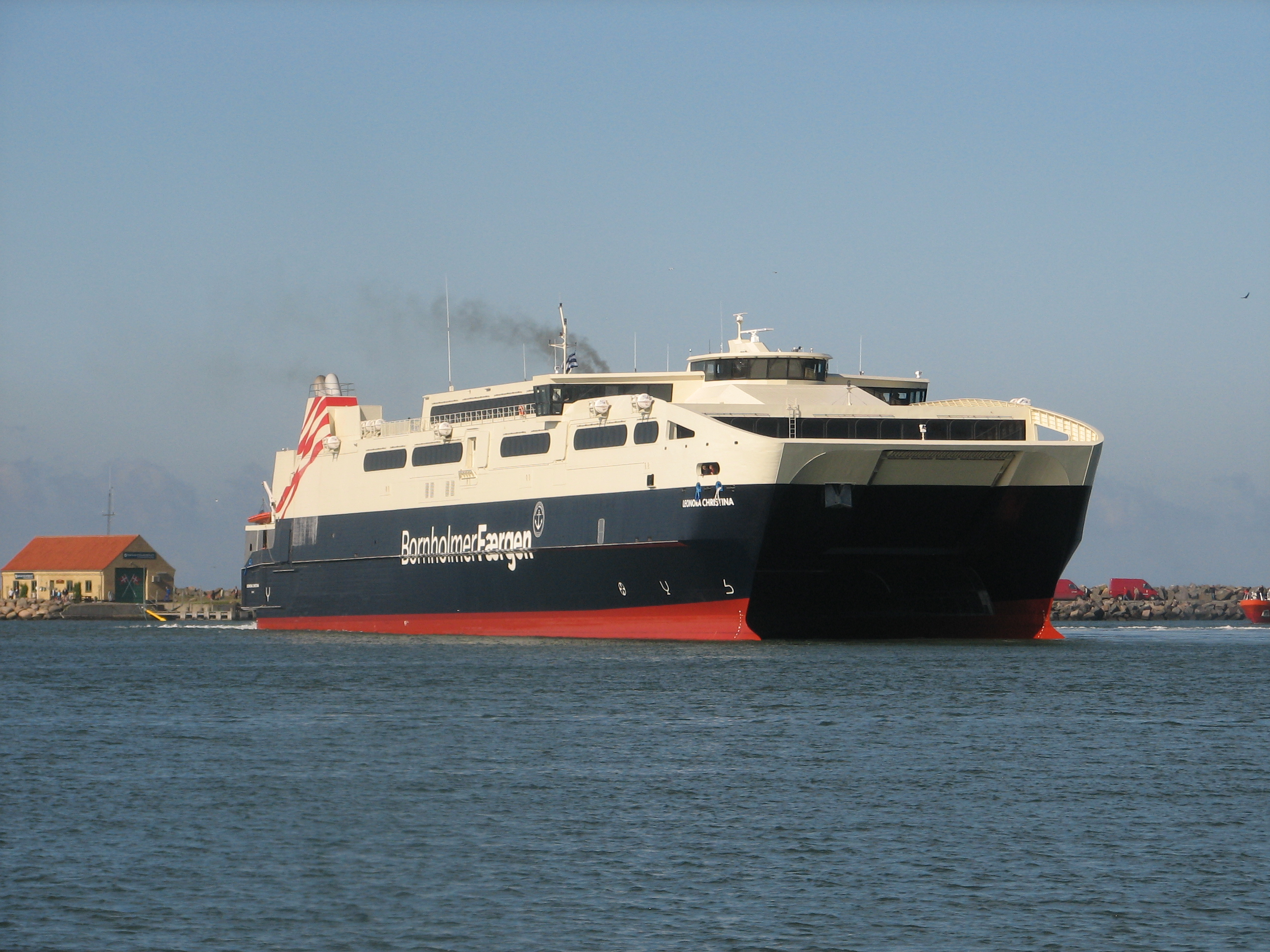
HSC Leonora Christina It is Denmark's third largest catamaran and it is in service between Rønne in Denmark and Ystad in Sweden.

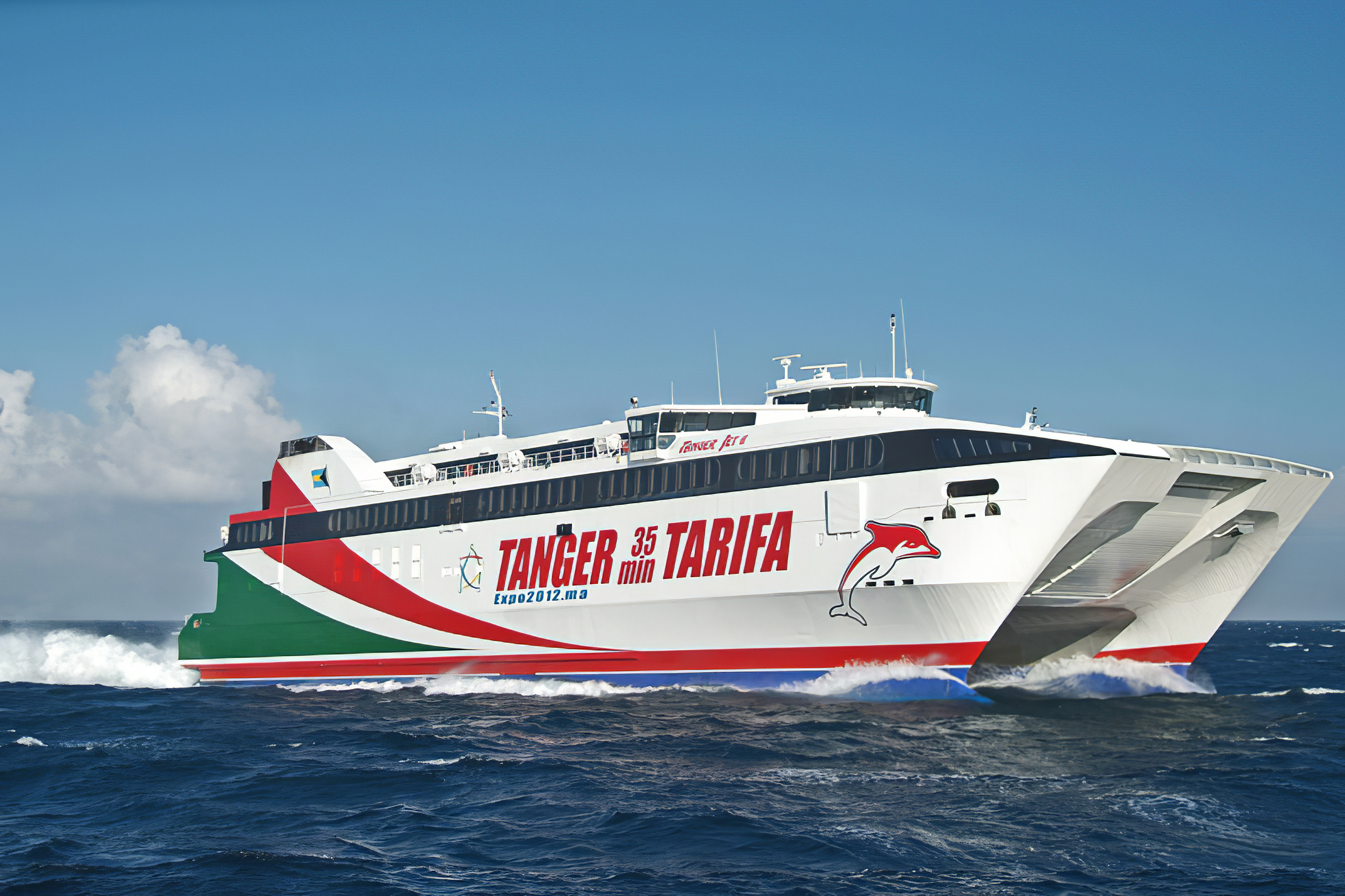
The HSC Tanger Jet II is a catamaran that provides ferry service between Tanger and Tarifa. She is the largest and fastest ferry in the Mediterranean Sea.

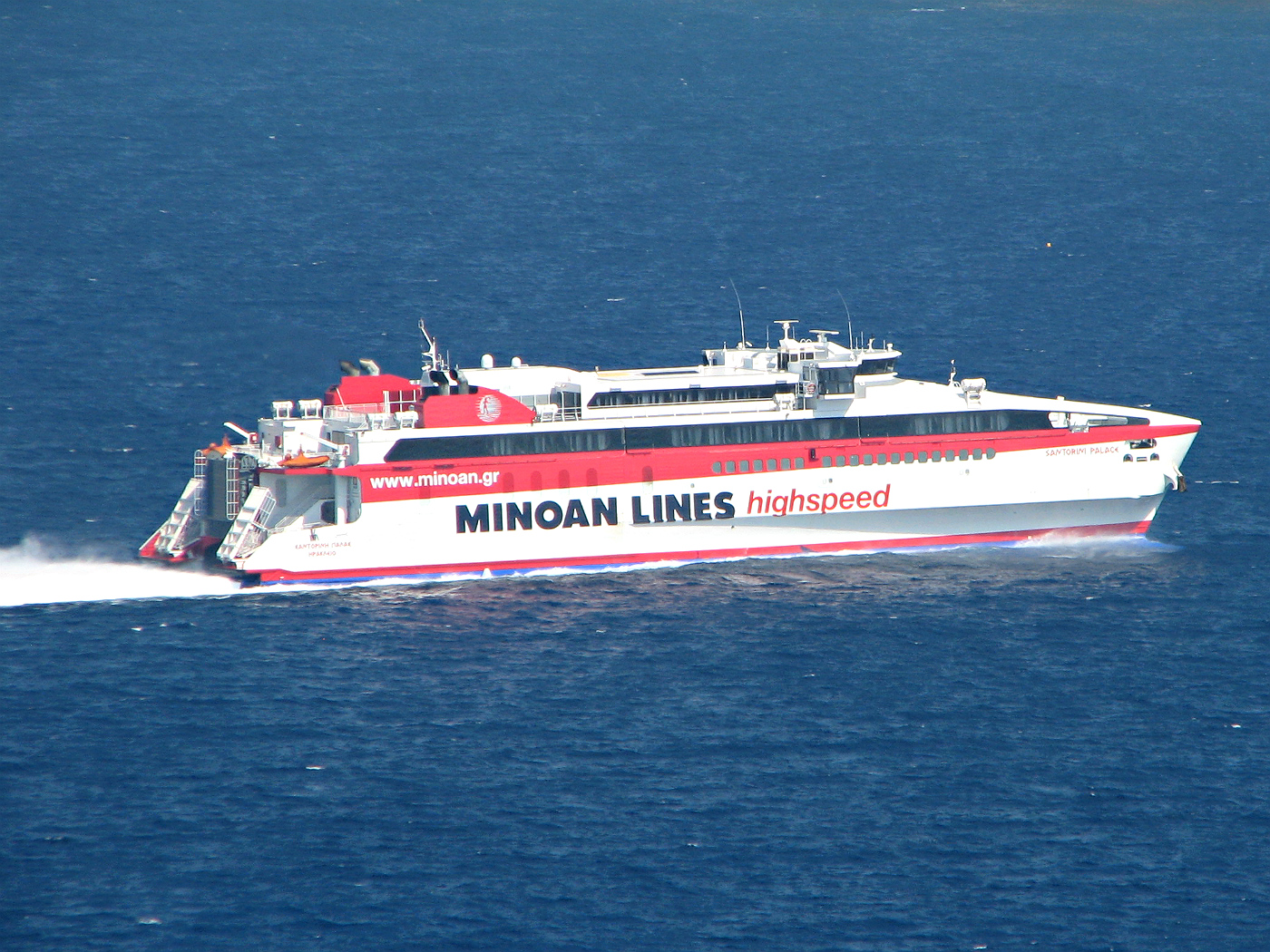
HSC Santorini Palace (ex Highspeed 5/7) is a catamaran that provides ferry services between Crete and several Cycladic islands.

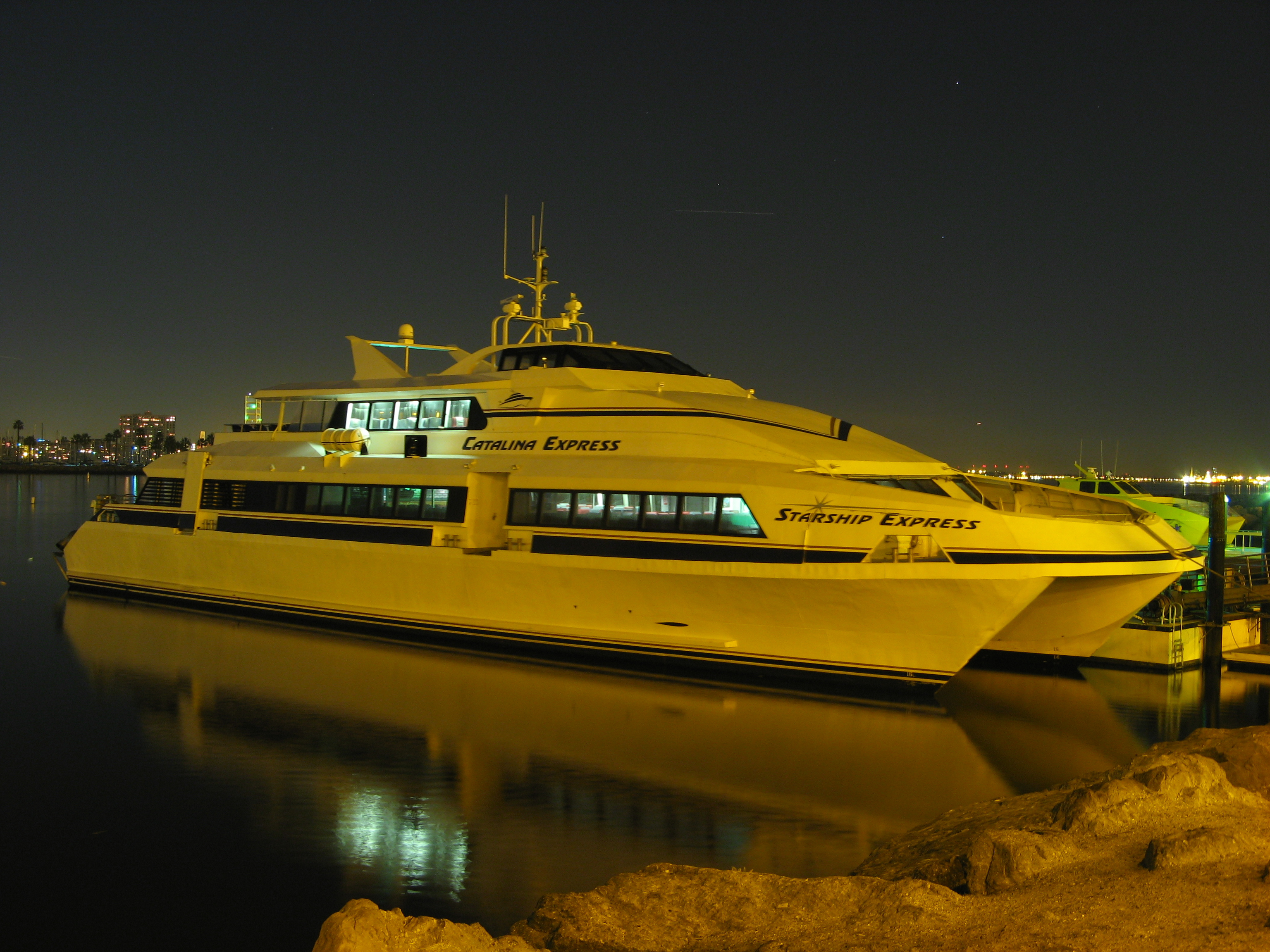
The Starship Express is a 300-passenger catamaran traveling between Long Beach, California, and Catalina Island.

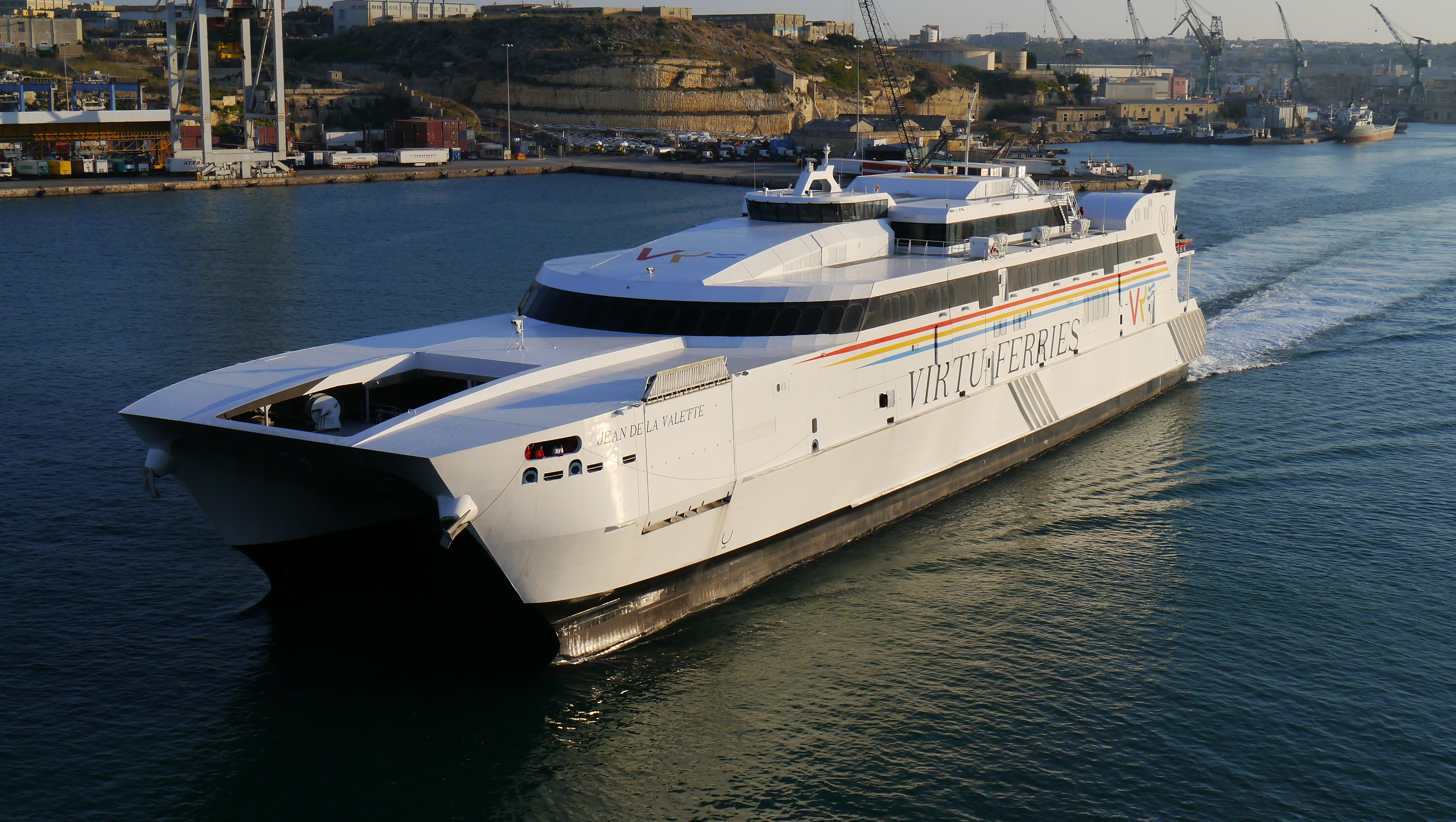
MV Jean De La Valette which operates between Malta and Sicily

==== Scandinavia and Baltic Sea ====
- Molslinjen - Denmark
  - KatExpress 1 - Jutland to Zealand, 40 knots. Incat ferry (1200 passengers & 417 cars. 112 metres. 10,503 tons)
  - KatExpress 2 - Jutland to Zealand, 40 knots. Incat ferry (1200 passengers & 417 cars. 112 metres. 10,503 tons)
  - KatExpress 3 - Jutland to Zealand, 40+ knots. Incat ferry (1000 passengers & 411 cars. 109 metres, 10,842 tons)
  - Max Mols - Jutland to Zealand, 48.1 knots. Incat ferry (800 passengers & 220 cars. 91.3 metres. 5,617 tons)
- BornholmerFærgen - Denmark to Sweden
  - Villum Clausen Rønne-Ystad, 47.7 knots. Passenger car ferry (1055 passengers and 215 cars).
  - Leonora Christina Rønne-Ystad, 40 knots. Passenger car ferry (1400 passengers and 357 cars).
- Stena Line HSS class 900 (High-speed Sea Service)
  - Stena Carisma (Stena Line Express) - Gothenburg, Sweden to Frederikshavn, Denmark
- Fjord Line AS, service between Hirtshals (Denmark) and Kristiansand (Norway) with the Fjord Cat catamaran for passengers and vehicles.
- Viking Line - Finland to Estonia
  - Viking FSTR - Helsinki to Tallinn. 42 knots. Incat ferry (900 passengers, 220 cars. 91 metres, 5902 tons)

==== British Isles ====
- Stena Line HSS class 1500 (High-speed Sea Service)
  - Stena Voyager - Stranraer to Belfast

(Incat 81 m catamaran)

  - Stena Lynx 3 - Fishguard, Wales to Rosslare, Ireland
- Jonathan Swift operated by Irish Ferries between Dublin, Republic of Ireland and Holyhead, United Kingdom
- Condor Ferries - United Kingdom to the Channel Islands and France.
  - Condor Express
  - Condor Vitesse
  - Condor Rapide
- Brittany Ferries - UK to France
  - Normandie Express - Portsmouth to Cherbourg and Caen
  - Normandie Vitesse - Poole to Cherbourg
- P&O Express, P&O Irish Sea running between Troon, Scotland or Cairnryan, Scotland and Larne, Northern Ireland.
- Red Funnel - Southampton to Cowes, Isle of Wight.
  - Red Jet 3, Red Jet 4, Red Jet 6 and Red Jet 7. All passenger-only catamarans.
- Isle of Man Steam Packet Company - Douglas to Liverpool, Belfast and Dublin
  - Manannan
- Wightlink - Portsmouth to Ryde, Isle of Wight]
  - Wight Ryder I and Wight Ryder II. Both passenger-only catamarans
- Manche Iles Express - France to the Channel Islands
- Pentland Ferries - Gills Bay, Scotland to St Margarets Hope in Orkney

==== Mediterranean countries ====
- A number of high-speed catamarans are used as ferries from Piraeus to various islands of the Aegean Sea, including Crete.
  - Sea Jet : HSC Champion Jet 1 & HSC Champion Jet 2, superjet, megajet.
  - Hellenic seaways : Flyingcats 1,2,3,4 & 5, highspeed 4,5,6 & 7
- Virtu Ferries - Malta to Sicily
  - MV Saint John Paul II
  - MV Jean de La Valette
- Fred. Olsen Express operates a fleet of five Incat and Austal ferries in the Canary Islands.
- Naviera Armas operates a mixed fleet of Incat high speed ferries and mono-hull ferries in the Canary Islands and Alboran Sea.
- Spanish company Baleària operate a fleet of Incat high speed ferries and mono hull vessels across the Straits of Gibraltar from Algeciras to Ceuta and Tangier and from ports on the Spanish mainland to the Balearic Islands.
- İDO operates a fleet that consists of high-speed car ferries, double-ended ferries and seabuses in Sea of Marmara.
- Toremar operates Schiopparello Jet between Piombino, Cavo and Portoferraio on Elba.

=== Americas ===
==== Atlantic Coast ====
- MBTA Harbor Express operates two 149-passenger catamarans connecting Quincy, MA and Hull, MA with Downtown Boston and Logan Airport.
- The Salem Ferry connects Salem, MA and Downtown Boston in 45 minutes, sailing at over 30 knots (56 km/h).
- Vineyard Fast Ferry operates high-speed service between Quonset Point, North Kingstown, RI and Martha's Vineyard with the Millennium, a 400 passenger high-speed catamaran with service speed of 35 knots (65 km/h).
- New England Fast Ferry- Operates between New Bedford MA, and Vineyard Haven and Oak Bluffs on the Island of Martha's Vineyard. nefastferry.com
- Interstate Navigation operates the Athena between Point Judith and Block Island.
- Block Island Express connects New London, Connecticut, to Block Island.
- SeaStreak operates a high speed ferry service with four 505 passenger catamarans, two 600-700 passenger catamarans and two 149 passenger catamarans between Central Jersey and Manhattan. From April to November they offer trips from Central New Jersey to New Bedford and Martha's Vineyard on two 149 passenger boats.
- Bay Ferries Limited operates “The Cat” (MV Alakai), a car ferry between Yarmouth, Nova Scotia and Bar Harbor, Maine during the summer tourist season. Operating speed is 35 knots and the crossing typically takes 3.5 hours one way.
- Hy-Line Cruises operates a fleet of four catamarans out of Hyannis on Cape Cod. The company operates year round service from Hyannis to the island of Nantucket and seasonal service from Hyannis to Oak Bluffs on the island of Martha’s Vineyard. They also operate seasonal inter island service between Oak Bluffs and Nantucket.
- The Steamship Authority also operates high speed service between Hyannis on Cape Cod and Nantucket island using a single catamaran the MV Iyanough. The Steamship Authority’s high speed service operates between April and December.

==== Lakes and Rivers ====
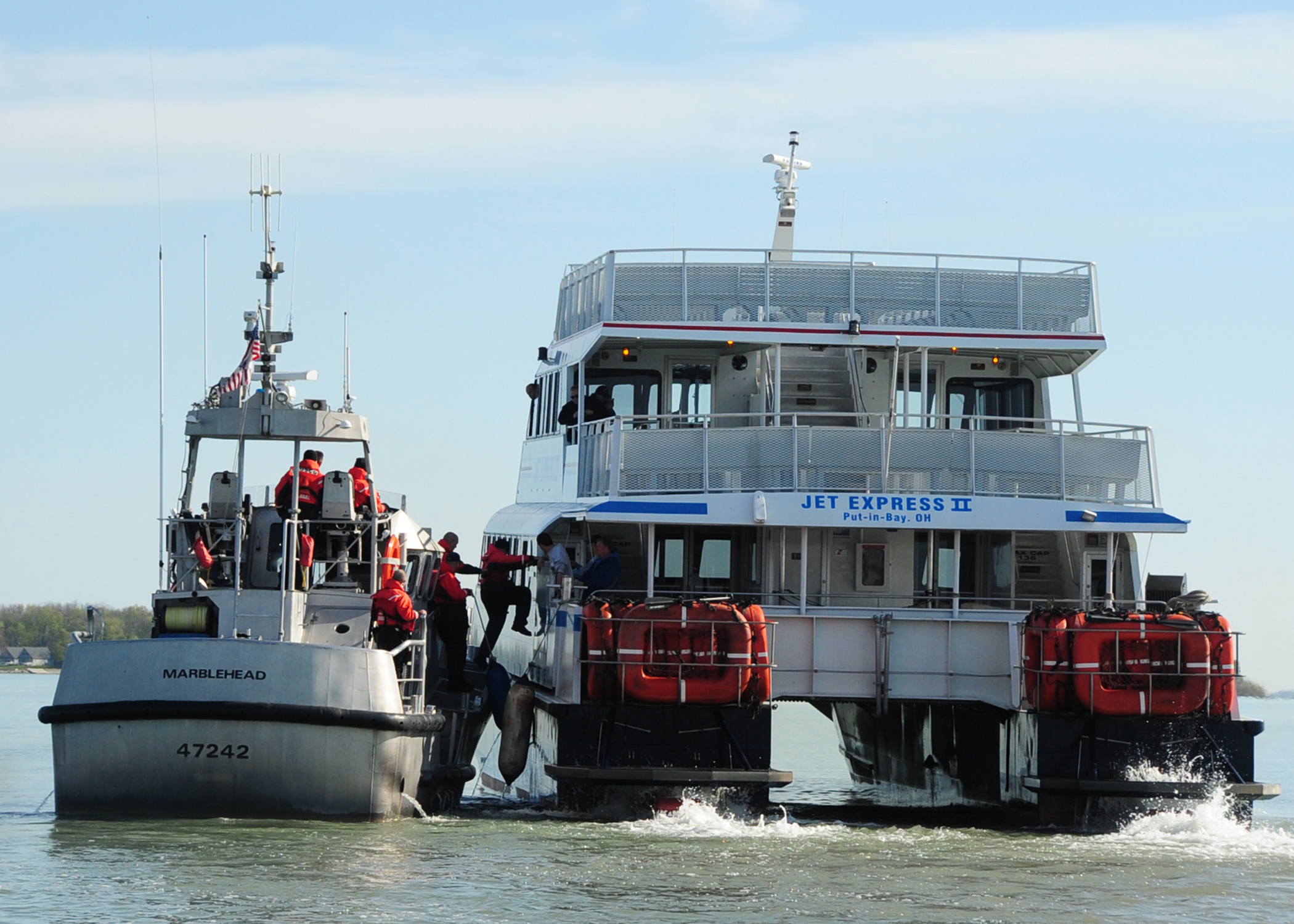
The MV Jet Express II provides high speed ferry service to Put-in-Bay, Ohio.

- Lake Express running between Milwaukee, Wisconsin, and Muskegon, Michigan
- Arnold Transit Company provides high-speed water-jet–powered catamaran ferry service to Mackinac Island, Michigan.
- The Jet Express Fleet provides high-speed water-jet-powered catamaran ferry service to the Lake Erie Islands of Put-in-Bay (South Bass Island) and Kelleys Island from Port Clinton, Sandusky, and Cedar Point.
- CNM Evolution, high-speed passenger & vehicle catamaran that travels between Rimouski, Quebec, Canada and Forestville, Quebec, Canada. The ferry travels across the St. Lawrence River, and can accommodate 175 passengers, 30 vehicles while travelling at speeds up to 30 nautical miles (56 km) per hour. The boat was built in Norway and has 2 2,800 hp engines. The ferry service is operated by Traverse Rimouski-Forestville.

==== Pacific Coast ====
- SeaBus ferries linking North Vancouver and Downtown Vancouver, British Columbia.
- MV Emerald Clipper and MV Victoria Clipper V of Clipper Navigation, Inc., provides high-speed water-jet–powered catamaran ferry service between Victoria, British Columbia, and Seattle, Washington.
- Catamaran service between Seattle and Bremerton on board the Rachel Marie with the Kitsap Ferry Company
- Baylink catamaran ferry between Vallejo and San Francisco.
- Golden Gate Ferry operates four catamaran ferries between Marin County and San Francisco along with three older monohulls in secondary service.
- Catalina Express provides daily service to Catalina Island from San Pedro, Long Beach and Dana Point, California.
- Catalina Flyer out of Newport Beach, California, is a 500-passenger high-speed catamaran to and from Avalon, California, on Santa Catalina Island.
- Aqualink catamaran ferry between Alamitos Bay and Long Beach Harbor in Long Beach, California.

==== Caribbean and South America ====
- Ultramar is a Mexican company which operates high-speed catamaran service between the Cancún, Isla Mujeres and Cozumel ports in the Quintana Roo Peninsula.
- The T&T Express and the T&T Spirit, both owned by the Trinidad and Tobago government, are two HSCs that provide a daily ferry service between Trinidad and Tobago.
- Conferry provides service between Puerto La Cruz and Margarita Island in Venezuela with its fleet of 2 HSC's, "Carmen Ernestina" and "Lilia Concepción".*Brazil - Rio de Janeiro - Guanabara Bay (shorts distances) - XV Place (city of Rio de Janeiro) to Paqueta Island (travel time: 40/70 minutes); XV Place to Niteroi city (travel time: 20 minutes). The CCR Barcas heave a permission of state of Rio de Janeiro to operate this services.
- Buquebus is an Uruguayan/Argentine company which operates ferry services from Montevideo, Colonia and Piriapolis to Buenos Aires.

=== Asia ===
- FoilCat, FlyingCat and Tricat operated by Turbojet Ferry, running between Hong Kong and Macau. (Turbojet also operates a fleet of hydrofoils, mainly Boeing Jetfoil. FoilCat is in fact a hybrid of hydrofoil and catamaran.)
- Multiple companies, such as SuperCat, OceanJet and Weesam Express, offer HSC services connecting the most populated islands in the Philippines, for instance between Iloilo City and Bacolod and between Cebu City and Tagbilaran.
- Lomprayah High Speed Ferries operate in the Gulf of Thailand between Koh Samui, Koh Pha Ngan, Koh Tao and Chumphon. The six ferries Pralarn, Namuang, Maenam, Koh Prab, Thongsala and Maehaad are designed by Incat Crowther.
- The Tokai Kisen operates 4 HSC vessels "Seven Islands AI", "Seven Islands NIJI", "Seven Islands TOMO" and "Seven Islands TAIRYŌ" between Tokyō Takeshiba Passenger Ship Terminal, Atami and Izu Islands, Japan.
- Kobe-Kankū Bay Shuttle, The OM Kobe, Kobe municipal government's subsidiary company, operates 3 HSC vessels "Sora", "Umi" and "Kaze" between Kobe Airport and Kansai Airport, Japan.
- SSTH Ocean Arrow

=== Oceania ===
- Port Phillip Ferries operates commuter services to Melbourne Docklands from Portarlington on the Bellarine Peninsula and Geelong using 35 metre Incat ferries. Each location has two services per day to Melbourne.
- Aremiti operates two modern, Australian-made high speed catamarans between the port terminal in Tahiti and the island of Moorea in the French Polynesia Islands.
- Stewart Island Experience operates high speed catamarans "Southern Express" and "Foveaux Express" between Bluff and Oban Stewart Island, New Zealand
- RiverCity Ferries along the Brisbane River in Queensland, Australia.
- Fantome Cat, Reef Cat, Palm Cat and Sunbird, operated by Kelsian Group, running between Townsville, Queensland and Magnetic Island.
- Cruise Whitsundays catamaran ferries operating from Shute Harbour and Abel Point, Queensland to Hamilton Island, Hamilton Island Airport, Daydream Island, Whitehaven Beach and Reefworld on the Great Barrier Reef. Fleet includes "Cobia", Kingfish", "Swordfish", "Barracuda", "Seahorse", "Orca", and "Sea Flyte".
- Tangalooma "Express", "Flyer" and "Jet" high speed resort transfer catamarans that operate between Brisbane and Moreton Island.
- Stradbroke flyer high speed water taxi services to North Stradbroke Island, vessels include "Calypso", "Legacy" and "Redraw".
- Sealink Bay Islands , high speed service to southern Moreton Bay islands Brisbane Queensland. Fleet includes "A.L. Robb", "Perulpa", "Jumpinpin", "Kurrowera 1", "Talwurrapin", "Kalamaru" and "Inswiabon".
- Sealink North Stradbroke Island, Fast Ferry service to North Stradbroke Island. Vessels include "Yalingbila".
- Manly Fast Ferry, express service from Manly to Circular Quay in Sydney Australia fleet includes "Ocean Dreaming II", "Ocean Rider", "Sea Cat I", "Sea Cat II"
- Rottnest Express ferries to Rottnest Island, Western Australia, fleet includes "Sea Eagle Express", "Eagle Express" and "Star Flyte Express".

=== Africa ===
- The Sikhululekile ferry commissioned and operated by Robben Island Museum runs between Robben Island and Cape Town ferrying visitors to and from the island. The fast ferry is based on an existing design by Damen Shipyards in the Netherlands and is the first vessel of its kind to be built and operated in Southern Africa.

== Monohull HSCs ==
- Super SeaCat
