= Fast ferry =

Fast ferries or fast ferry may refer to:

== Vessels ==
- High-speed craft, a high-speed water vessel also called a fast ferry
  - List of HSC ferry routes
- Passenger-Only Fast Ferry-class ferry, ferries propelled by water jets rather than traditional propellers
- MDV 1200-class fast ferry, a class of six vessels built by Fincantieri in Italy

== Businesses ==
- Fast Ferries (Greece), a Greek ferry operator
- Supercat Fast Ferry Corporation, a Philippines high-speed catamaran operator
- Kitsap Fast Ferries, an American passenger ferry service
- Ocean Fast Ferries, a Philippines high-speed craft operator
- Sydney Fast Ferries, an Australian high-speed ferry operator

== Other uses ==
- Fast Ferry Scandal, a political affair in the late 1990s in British Columbia, Canada
  - PacifiCat-class ferry, defunct fast ferries

== See also ==
- FastCat (disambiguation)
- Auto Express 86-class ferry, a class of high-speed catamarans by Austal Ships of Australia
- SpeedFerries, a British ferry operator 2004–2008
