= BGV (disambiguation) =

BGV may refer to:

- Bateau à Grande Vitesse, a concept of high speed ship being developed in France
- Bipim language, the ISO 639-3 code bgv
- Barking Riverside railway station, the station code BGV
- BGV Theorem, a theorem in physical cosmology
