= SSTH =

SSTH may refer to:

- Swiss School of Tourism and Hospitality
- Super slender twin hull, see SSTH Ocean Arrow
- Semantic script theory of humour
