= Malta Channel =

Coordinates: 36.35°N 14.65°E

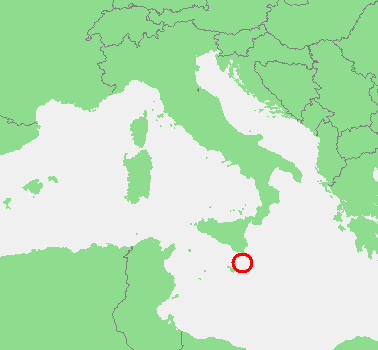
The Malta Channel.

The Malta Channel, also known as the Sicily-Malta Channel and the Malta-Sicily Channel, separates the European island of Malta from the southern tip of Sicily. The channel serves as a sea route link to Europe for the Maltese. Virtu Ferries takes people and cars from Malta to Italy and vice versa.

The channel has a maximum width of 102 km (63 mi), while at the narrowest point it measures about 81 km (50 mi). Characterized by relatively shallow waters, it has a maximum depth of 171 m (561 ft). The seabed, slightly deeper at the southern Maltese end, tends to rise as one approaches the Sicilian coasts.

In World War II, the channel saw naval battles and was also heavily mined when the Crown Colony of Malta tried to supply the island. For the July 1943 Allied invasion of Sicily, the Commonwealth forces crossed the Malta Channel, while the Americans sailed further to the west. There were earlier naval battles fought between the Knights of Malta and the Ottoman Navy, and also during the Punic Wars.
