= HSC Maria Dolores =

High-speed catamaran built by Austal

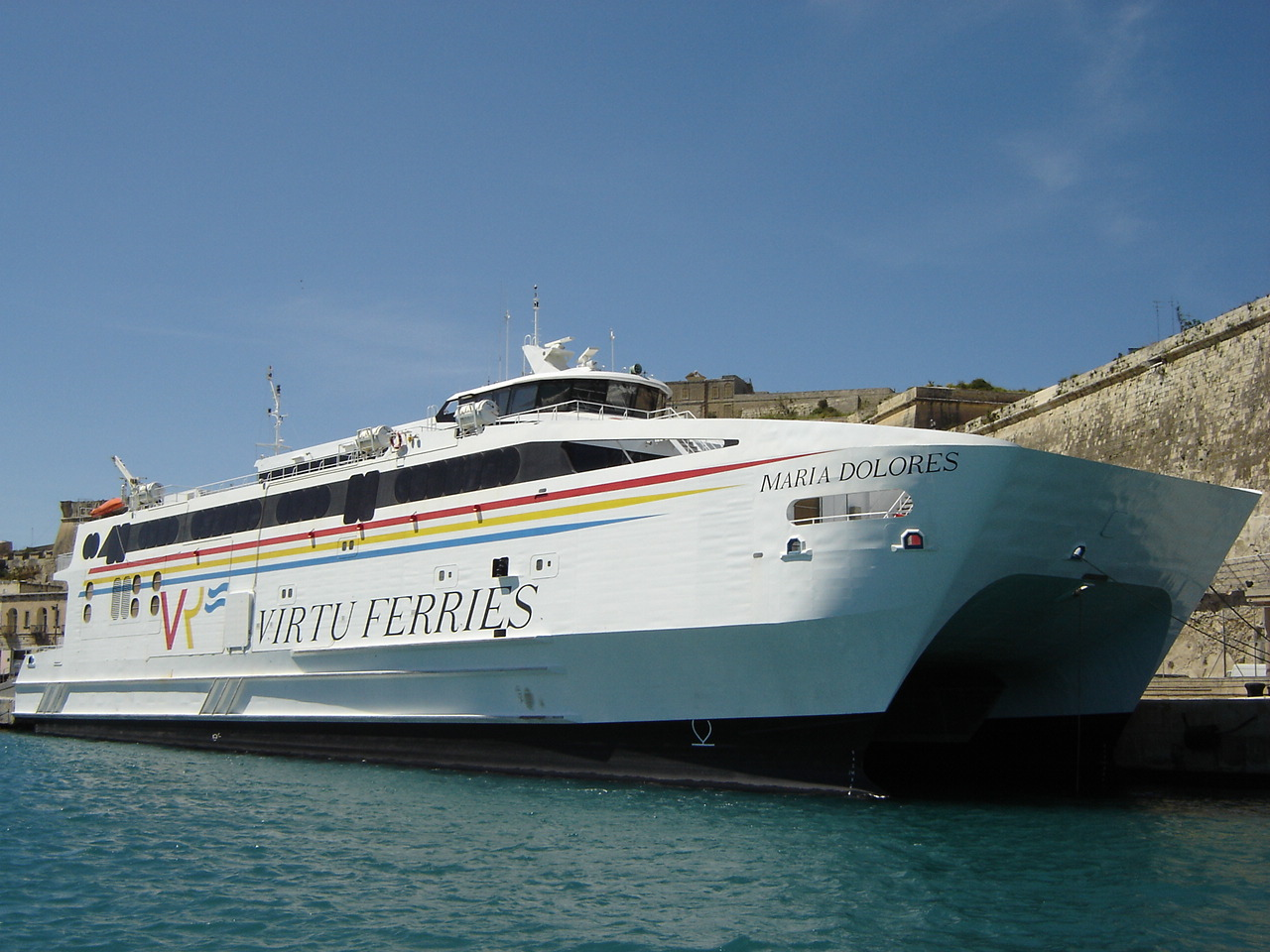
- Maria Dolores in Malta's Grand Harbour in April 2006

History
- Name: 2006–present: Maria Dolores
- Owner: 2006–present: Virtu Ferries
- Operator: 2006–2012: Virtu Ferries; 2012–2020: Inter Shipping (Chartered); 2020–2022: Virtu Ferries; 2022–2023: Inter Shipping (Chartered); 2023–present: Africa Morocco Link (AML) (Chartered)
- Port of registry: 2006–present: Valletta, Malta
- Route: Tarifa – Tangier City; Former: Valletta – Pozzallo / Catania; Former: Algeciras – Tanger Med
- Ordered: 2005
- Builder: Austal; Henderson, Australia
- Yard number: 259
- Laid down: 2005
- Launched: 2005
- Completed: February 2006
- Acquired: 2006
- Maiden voyage: March 2006
- In service: 2006
- Identification: IMO number: 9333448; Call sign: 9HBZ8; MMSI number: 215883000
- Status: in service

General characteristics
- Class & type: Austal Auto Express 68
- Tonnage: 3,023 GT; 260 DWT
- Length: 68.40 m (224 ft 5 in)
- Beam: 18.20 m (59 ft 9 in)
- Draught: 2.60 m (8 ft 6 in)
- Depth: 6.30 m (20 ft 8 in)
- Decks: 3
- Ramps: Aft and side vehicle loading ramps
- Installed power: 6 × MTU 16V 4000 M73L main diesel engines (total 14,790 kW / 19,830 hp)
- Propulsion: 6 × Rolls-Royce KaMeWa waterjets (4 × 80 SII steerable/reversible + 2 × 80 BII boosters)
- Speed: 36.0 knots (66.7 km/h; 41.4 mph) (service) / 38.0 knots (70.4 km/h; 43.7 mph) (max)
- Capacity: 600 passengers (508 Tourist Class / 92 Club Class); 65 cars or 95 truck lane metres + 35 cars
- Crew: 16

MV or HSC (Note: Most sources including Virtu Ferries use the prefix "MV" or "M/V" (for Motor vessel) when referring to Maria Dolores, but the prefix "HSC" (for High-speed craft) is also used.) Maria Dolores is a high-speed catamaran ferry owned by Virtu Ferries. It was built by Austal, Henderson, Western Australia in 2006, entering service as a ferry between Malta and Sicily in March 2006. The vessel soon became too small to allow for the increasing passenger and cargo traffic on this route, and in October 2010 it was replaced by the larger catamaran Jean de La Valette.

In 2011, the vessel took part in evacuating people from Tripoli during the Libyan Civil War. Between 2012 and 2020, it was leased to Inter Shipping SRA as a ferry between Tarifa and Tangier.

== Description ==
Maria Dolores has an overall length of 68.4 m (224 ft) and a waterline length of 58.8 m (193 ft). Its beam is 18.2 m (60 ft), and the hull has a depth of 6.3 m (21 ft) and a draught of about 2.6 m (8 ft 6 in). The vessel has a maximum deadweight tonnage of 260 t (260 long tons; 290 short tons).

The vessel has six MTU 16V 4000 M73L diesel engines, which drive six Rolls-Royce Kamewa waterjets (four 80 SII and two 80 BII) through six ZF gearboxes, providing propulsion for the vessel. It is the first ever fast ferry installed with sextuple waterjets. It has a capacity of 111,000 L (24,000 imp gal; 29,000 US gal) of fuel. The vessel's service speed is approximately 36 kn (67 km/h; 41 mph).

The vessel could accommodate 16 crew members and 600 passengers. It has three lounges: one for club class and two for tourists. The vessel has a capacity of 65 cars, or 95 truck lane metres and 35 cars. An aft ramp and a side ramp allow vehicles to be loaded and unloaded.

== Construction ==
Maria Dolores was built by Austal in Henderson, Western Australia. It was built in accordance to IMO codes, Malta Flag statutory requirements and Italian Port State requirements. A labour shortage led to construction taking longer than expected, delaying the planned delivery date of mid-2005. The vessel was mostly complete by September 2005, with sea trials beginning in November.

The vessel was handed over to Virtu Ferries on 3 February 2006, and it departed Fremantle on the journey to Malta on 7 February. On the delivery voyage, the vessel called at the Cocos (Keeling) Islands, the Maldives, Aden and Suez, then passed through the Suez Canal with further stops at Port Said and Pozzallo.

== Career ==
=== Malta–Sicily ferry ===
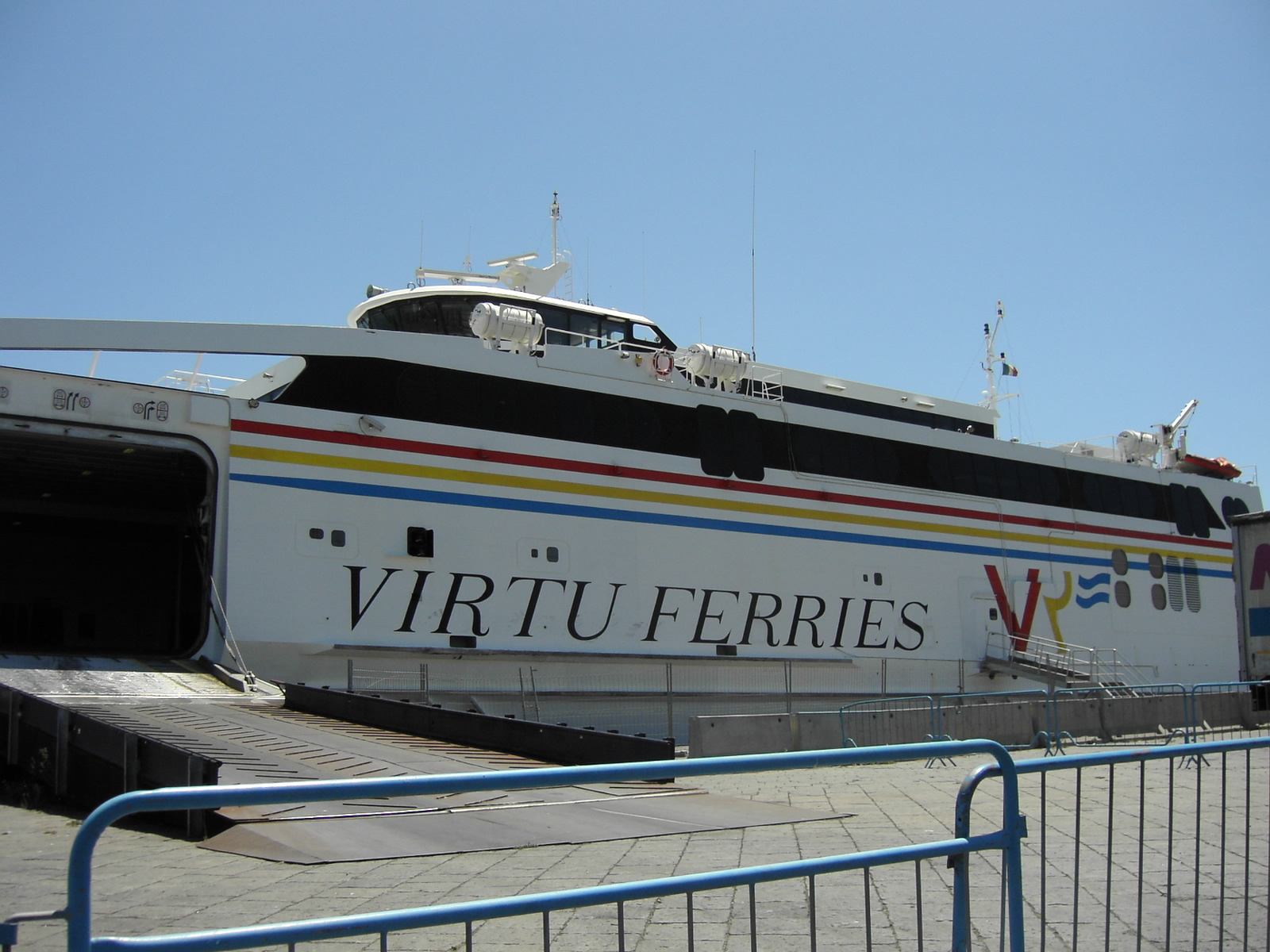
Maria Dolores in Catania in August 2010, showing the vessel's ramp for vehicles

The vessel was inaugurated by Prime Minister Lawrence Gonzi on 28 March 2006. Before it entered service, an open day was held and the public were invited to visit the vessel. The vessel operated year-round scheduled routes between Malta, Pozzallo and Catania in Sicily, and Reggio Calabria on mainland Italy. Routes from Malta took 90 minutes to Pozzallo, 3 hours to Catania and 4.5 hours to Reggio Calabria.

On 21 December 2007, Maria Dolores carried the first Maltese passengers able to travel without passports to Pozzallo, on the same day that Malta joined the Schengen Area.

Maria Dolores was meant to reduce delivery time of goods traveling between Malta and Sicily, reducing importation and exportation costs for Maltese companies. The cargo volume carried on the vessel was actually much greater than expected, and predicted cargo figures for 2015 were reached by 2009. This led to Virtu Ferries ordering a larger catamaran, the Jean de La Valette, in April 2009 – just over three years after Maria Dolores entered service. The Jean de La Valette, also built by Austal, replaced Maria Dolores on the Malta-Sicily route in October 2010.

=== Later career ===
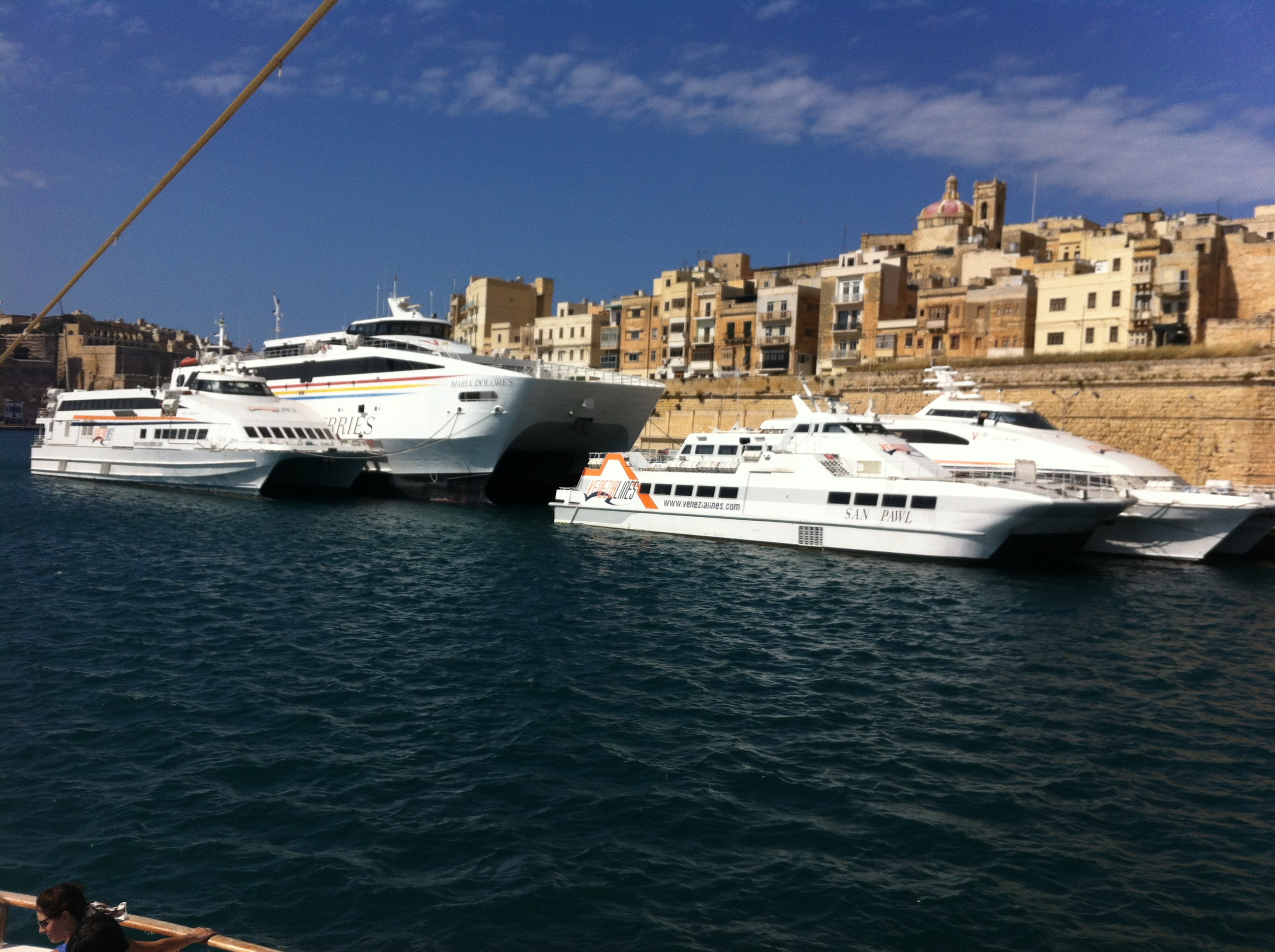
Maria Dolores and other smaller Virtu Ferries vessels moored off Senglea in May 2012

After the vessel was out of service, plans were made for it to operate on a different undisclosed route in the Mediterranean Sea.

During the Libyan Civil War, the vessel was chartered by the United States Embassy in Malta to evacuate some 500 to 550 people from Libya. Maria Dolores left Malta on 22 February 2011 and arrived in Tripoli on the following day. Embarkation of the passengers took longer than expected, and the vessel left Libya on 25 February, arriving in Malta on the same day. Two other Virtu Ferries catamarans, San Gwann and San Pawl, also took part in the evacuations.

In 2012, Maria Dolores was chartered to Inter Shipping SRA for a period of five years. The time charter agreement was renewed in 2017 with a three-year lease which expired on 31 May 2020. The vessel was operated by Inter Shipping SRA on a time charter basis on routes between Tarifa in Spain and Tangier in Morocco until this service was suspended due to the COVID-19 pandemic.

On 2 April 2022, during Pope Francis' visit to Malta, he traveled on board the Maria Dolores in an hour-long journey from the Grand Harbour to Mġarr, Gozo.
