= High-speed craft =

High speed water vessel for civilian use

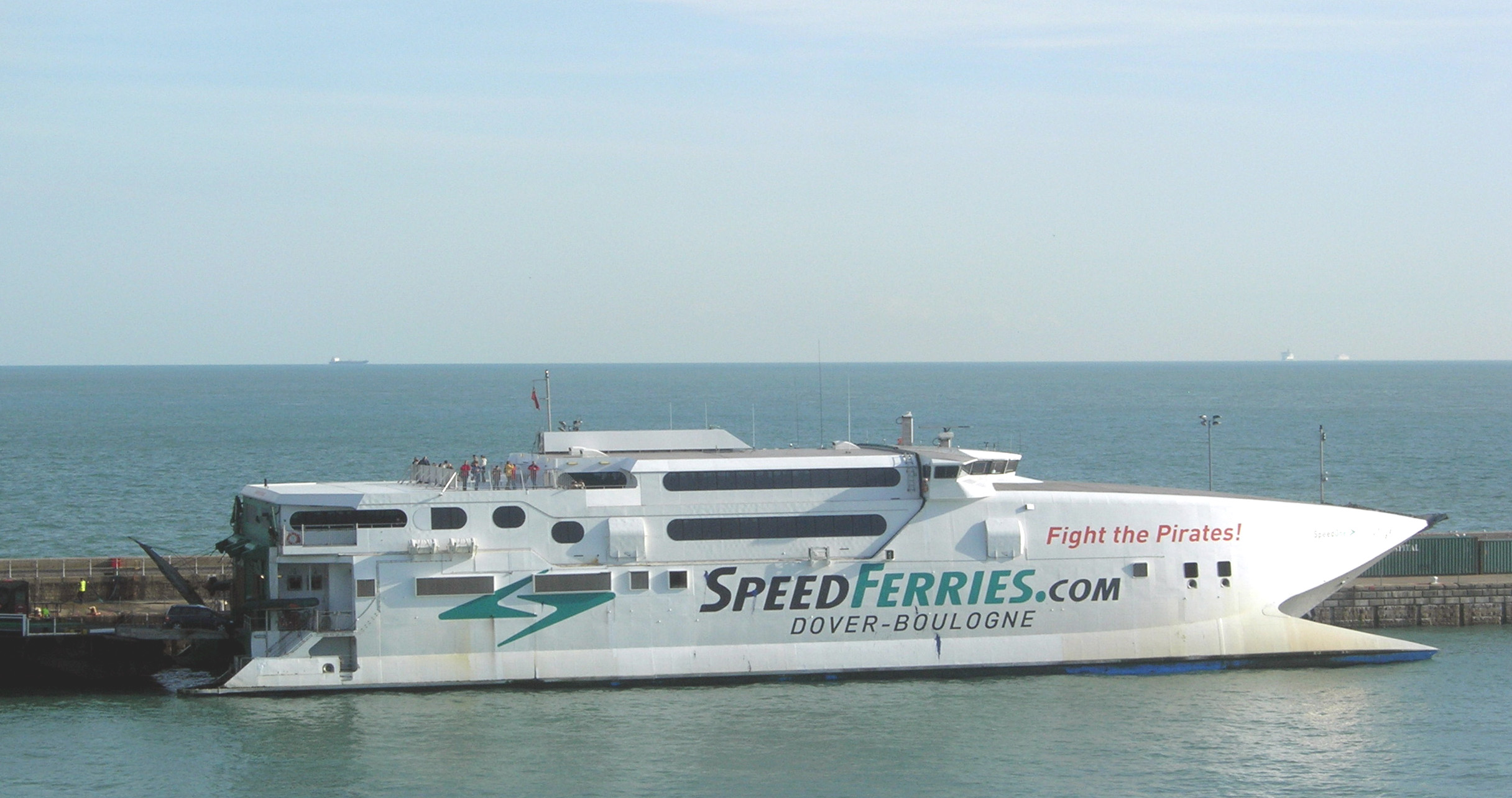
SpeedFerries SpeedOne, a high-speed wavepiercer catamaran

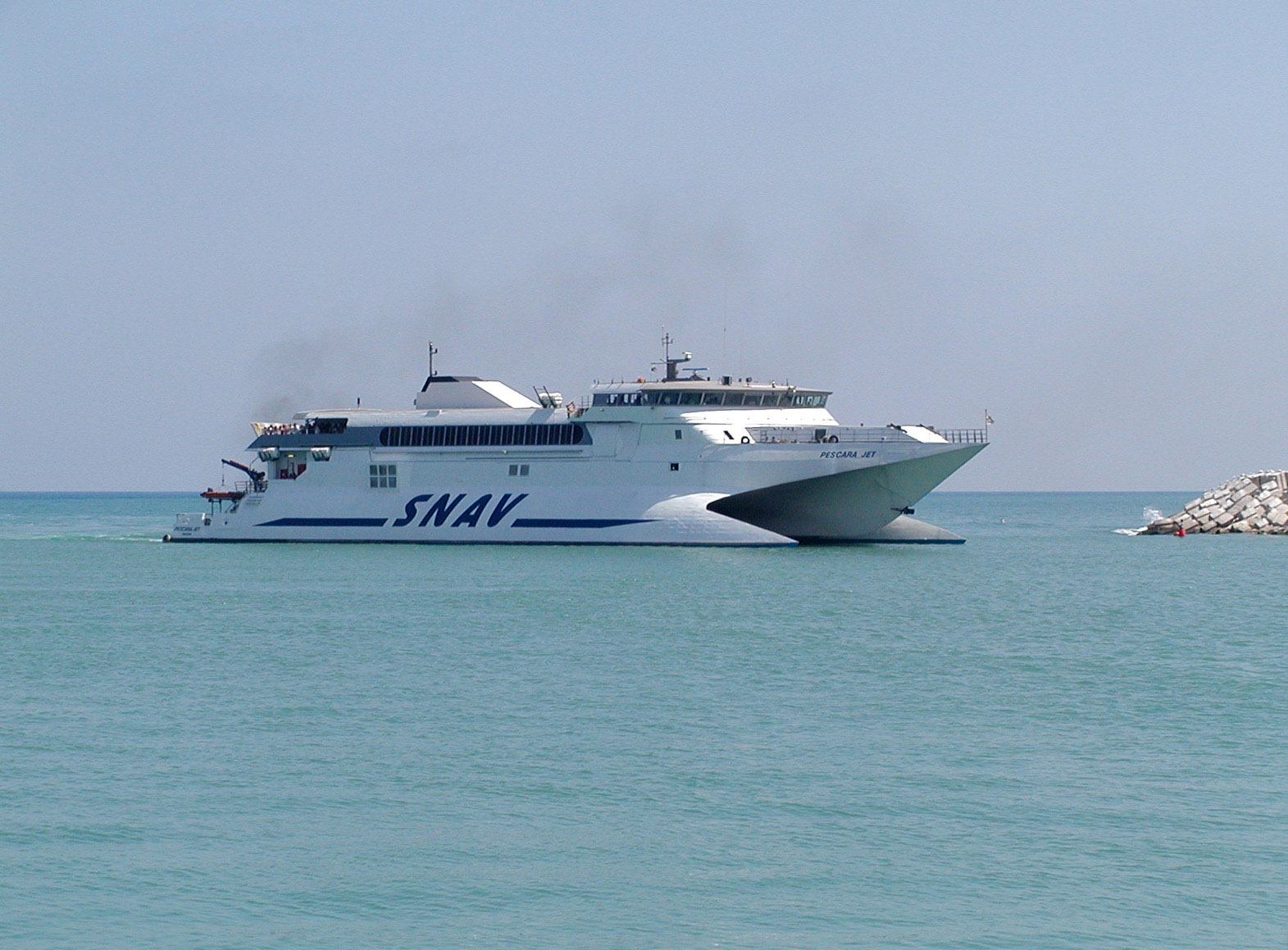
Pescara Jet, a high-speed catamaran by SNAV

A high-speed craft (HSC) is a high-speed water vessel for civilian use, also called a fastcraft or fast ferry. The first high-speed craft were often hydrofoils or hovercraft, but in the 1990s catamaran and monohull designs become more popular. Most high-speed craft serve as passenger ferries, but the largest catamarans and monohulls also carry cars, buses, large trucks and freight.

In the 1990s there were a variety of builders, but due to HSC high fuel consumption, many shipbuilders have withdrawn from this market so the construction of the largest fast ferries, up to 127 metres, has been consolidated to two Australian companies, Austal of Perth and Incat of Hobart. There is still a wide variety of builders for smaller fast catamaran ferries between 24 and 60 metres.

Hulled designs are often powered by pump-jets coupled to medium-speed diesel engines. Hovercraft are usually powered by gas turbines or diesel engines driving propellers and impellers.

The design and safety of high-speed craft is regulated by the International Convention for the Safety of Life at Sea (SOLAS) Convention, Chapter 10, High-Speed Craft (HSC) Codes of 1994 and 2000, adopted by the Maritime Safety Committee of the International Maritime Organization (IMO).

In accordance with SOLAS Chapter 10 Reg. 1.3, high-speed craft are craft capable of a maximum speed, in metres per second (m/s), equal to or exceeding:

$$3.7 \times \triangledown^{0.1667}$$

where $\triangledown$ = volume of displacement in cubic metres corresponding to the design waterline, excluding craft of which the hull is supported clear above the water surface in non-displacement mode by aerodynamic forces generated by ground effect.

== HSC examples ==
Alstom Leroux Naval

- Kalli P
- SuperRunner Jet II
- Aeolos Kenteris I

Austal

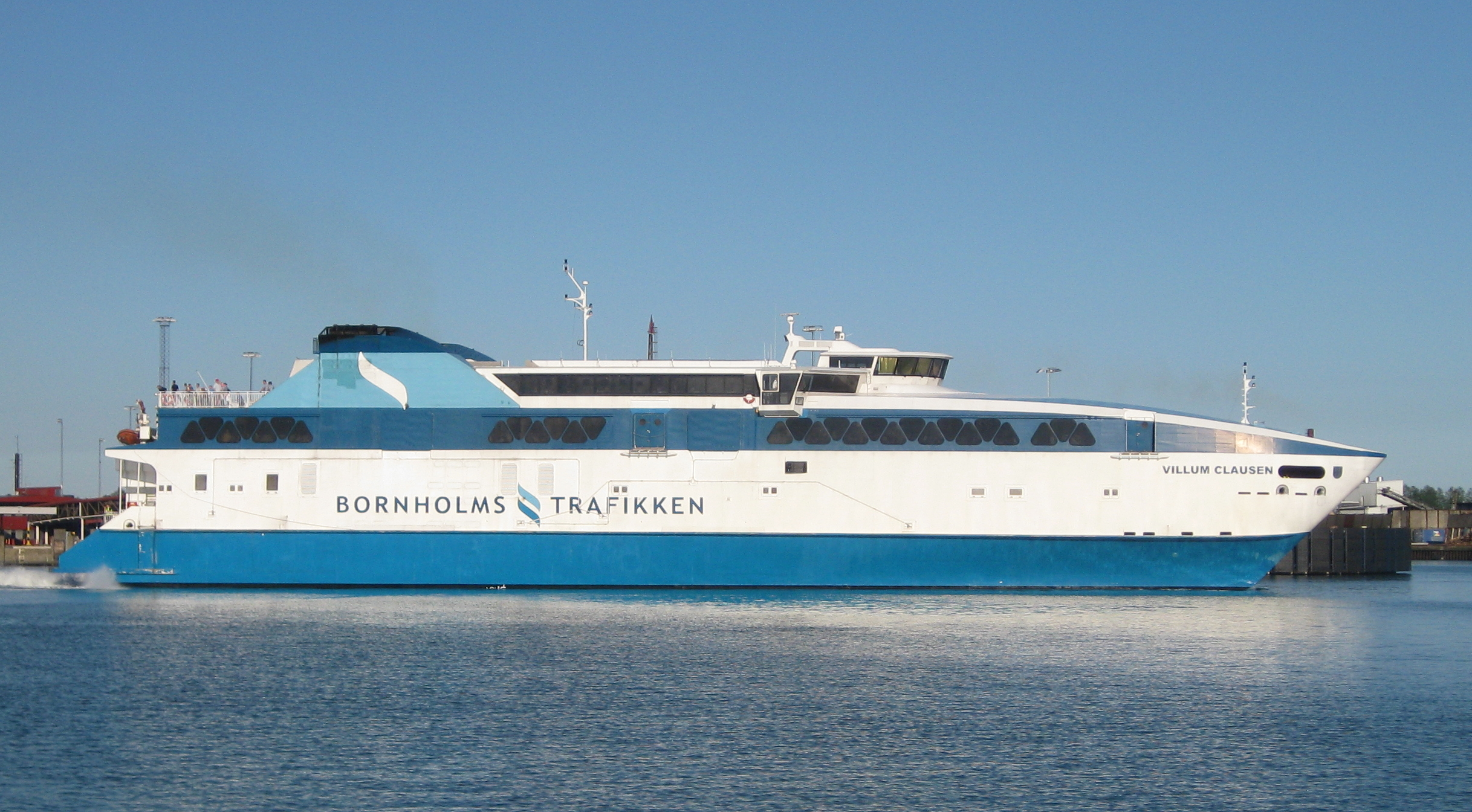
Villum Clausen by BornholmerFærgen

- Auto Express 86-class ferry
- Hawaii Superferry
- Olympic Champion Jet
- Benchijigua Express, world's largest civilian trimaran
- HSC Dolphin Jet
- HSC Cecilia Payne
- HSC Lake Express (Lake Michigan)
- HSC Leonora Christina
- WorldChampion Jet
- Condor Liberation
- MV Maria Dolores
- MV Jean de La Valette

Buquebus

- HSC Francisco

Catamaran Ferries International

- PacifiCat-class ferry

Dakota Creek Industries

- Passenger-Only Fast Ferry-class ferry

Empresa Nacional Bazán

- HSC Silvia Ana L

Fincantieri

- HSC Golden Princess
- MDV 1200-class fast ferry

Gladding-Hearn Shipbuilding

- MV Iyanough

IHI Corporation

- SSTH Ocean Arrow

Incat

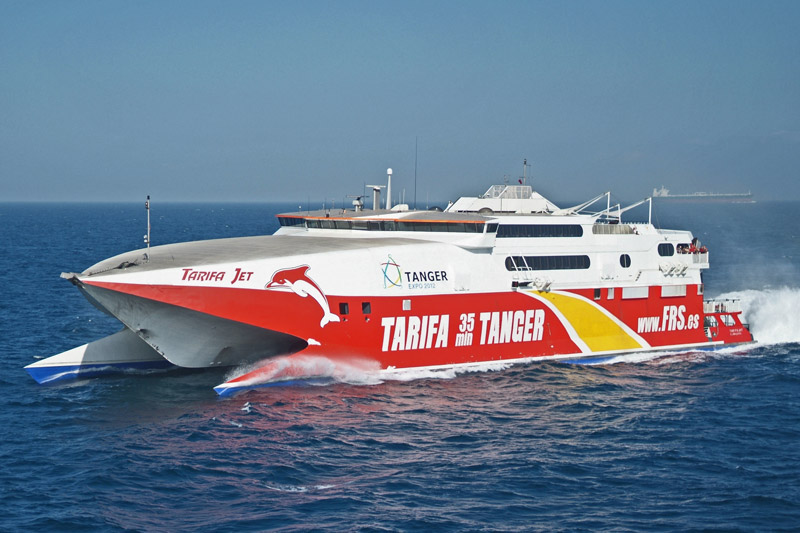
Tarifa Jet, a high-speed wavepiercer catamaran by Incat

- Madiba 1 - operated by falcon Marine
- KatExpress 1, one of three similar 112-metre Incat vessels on this route
- Tarifa Jet
- HSV-2 Swift
- Champion Jet 3
- MV Saint John Paul II

Krasnoye Sormovo

- Raketa (hydrofoil)

Ocean Fast Ferries

- OceanJet 1
- OceanJet 2
- OceanJet 3
- OceanJet 5
- OceanJet 6
- OceanJet 7
- OceanJet 8
- OceanJet 88
- OceanJet 888
- OceanJet 188
- OceanJet 288
- OceanJet 9
- OceanJet 10
- OceanJet 11
- OceanJet 12
- OceanJet 15

STX Finland

- Stena Line's HSS 1500

Supercat

- St. Nuriel
- St. Sealthiel
- St. Emmanuel
- St. Uriel
- St. Jhudiel
- St. Braquiel
- St. Camael
- St. Sariel
- Sprint 1

Westermoen Hydrofoil

- Stena Line's HSS 900

== See also ==
- List of high-speed craft ferry routes
- BGV
