= HSC Saint John Paul II =

Ferry built in 2018

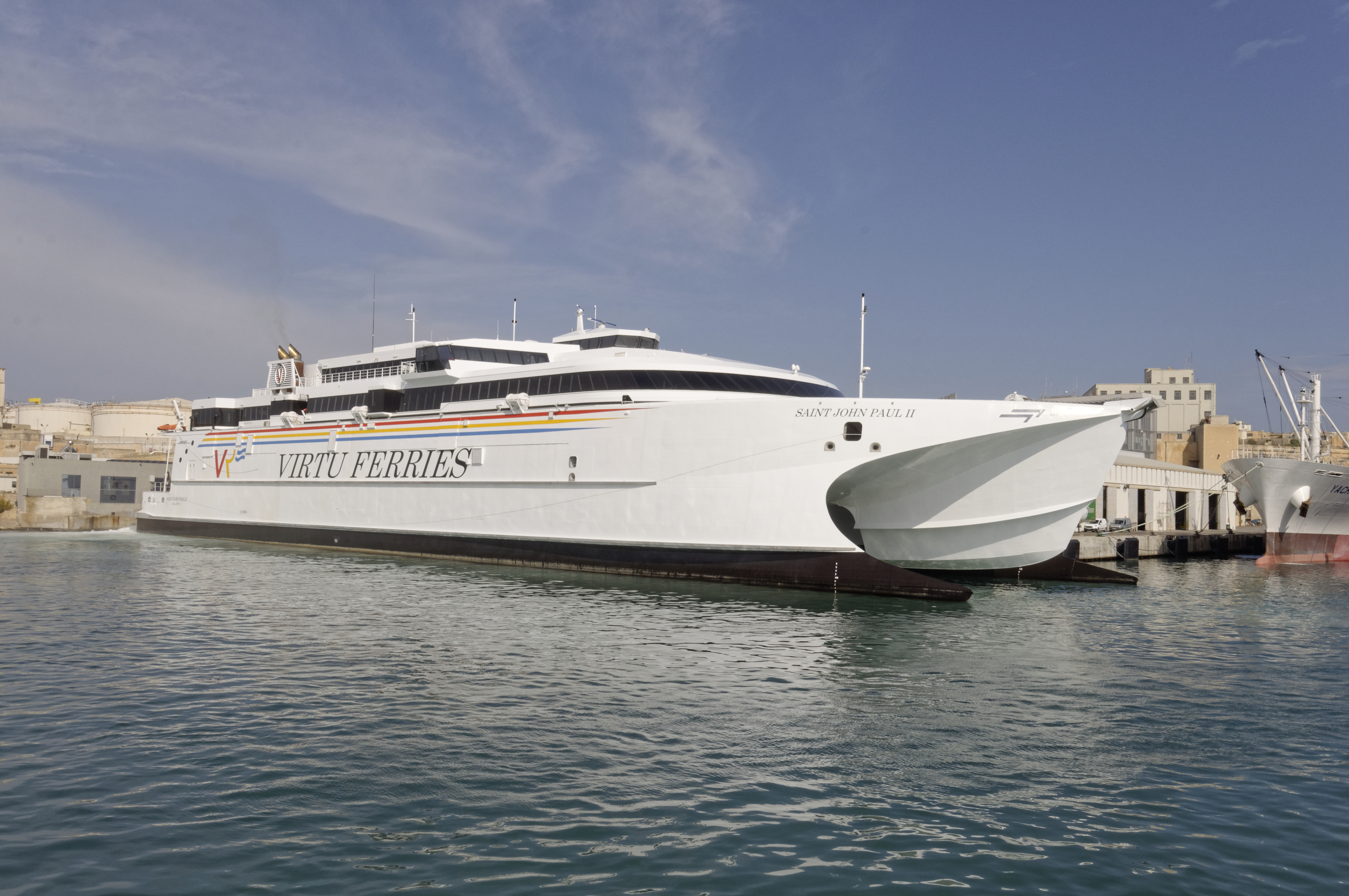
- Saint John Paul II in the Grand Harbour in October 2019

History

Malta
- Name: Saint John Paul II
- Namesake: Pope John Paul II
- Owner: Virtu Ferries
- Operator: Virtu Ferries
- Port of registry: Valletta, Malta
- Route: Valletta–Pozzallo
- Ordered: July 2016
- Builder: Incat, Hobart, Tasmania
- Cost: €75 million (2016)
- Yard number: 089
- Launched: 22 December 2018
- In service: 11 March 2019
- Identification: IMO number: 9817274; MMSI number: 248015000; Call sign: 9HA4474
- Status: In service

General characteristics
- Type: High-speed catamaran
- Tonnage: dwt 1,000 t (980 long tons; 1,100 short tons)
- Length: 110.6 m (363 ft) (overall); 101.9 m (334 ft) (waterline)
- Beam: 28.2 m (93 ft) (moulded); 5.4 m (18 ft) (beam of hulls)
- Draught: 4.277 m (14.03 ft)
- Installed power: 4 x MTU 20V 8000 M71L engines (9,100kW each)
- Propulsion: 4 x Wärtsilä LJX 1500SR waterjets
- Speed: 37 kn (69 km/h; 43 mph)
- Capacity: 1120 seats but only 900 passengers declared; 490 truck lane metres or 167 cars. Maximum 30 motorbikes, 18 trailers (17mt each) depends on trip
- Crew: from 22 to 30

MV or HSC (Note: Most sources (including Virtu Ferries) use the prefix "MV" or "M/V" (for Motor vessel) when referring to the Saint John Paul II, but the prefix "HSC" (for High-speed craft) is also used.) Saint John Paul II is a high-speed catamaran ferry owned and operated by Virtu Ferries. Built by Incat in 2017–18, the vessel entered service as a ferry between Malta and Sicily in March 2019. It is the largest vessel of its kind in the Mediterranean Sea, and the second largest in the world.

== Description ==
On entering service Saint John Paul II became the largest high-speed catamaran in the Mediterranean Sea, and the second largest in the world, surpassing the MV Jean de La Valette, also operated by Virtu Ferries. It has an overall length of 110.6 m (363 ft) and a waterline length of 101.9 m (334 ft). Its moulded beam is 28.2 m (93 ft), the beam of the hulls is 5.4 m (18 ft), and it has a draught of 4.277 m (14.03 ft). The vessel consists of two aluminium hulls connected by a bridging section, with the forward end containing a central bow structure. It has a deadweight tonnage of 1,000 t (980 long tons; 1,100 short tons).

The catamaran's main engines are four MTU 20V 8000 M71L engines. It is propelled by four Wärtsilä LJX 1500SR waterjets. The vessel's service speed is approximately 37 kn (69 km/h; 43 mph).

The vessel is designed to accommodate 1,120 passengers and 24 crew. It has two deck levels and the vessel's vehicle capacity is 490 truck lane metres or 167 cars.

== Construction ==
Virtu Ferries ordered the catamaran in July 2016 at a cost of €75 million in order to provide for an increased capacity of cargo traffic and passengers between Malta and Sicily. In 2017 it was announced that the vessel would be named Saint John Paul II, after Pope John Paul II, who had traveled on a Virtu Ferries catamaran, the ACC San Frangisk, during his 1990 visit to Malta. The vessel is the second Incat-built ship named after a pope, after the HSC Francisco, which is named after Pope Francis. The vessel was built in accordance with DNV GL Classification Society Rules and with IMO High Speed Craft HSC 2000, along with Malta Flag statutory requirements and Italian Port State requirements.

The catamaran was built as Hull 089 by Incat in Hobart, Tasmania, and it was designed by Revolution Design and Seaspeed Marine Consulting and tank-tested at Qinetiq. Construction began in 2017, and the vessel was launched on 22 December 2018. Sea trials began in January 2019, and the vessel was handed over to Virtu Ferries on 24 January. It was delivered to Malta in a two-week journey between 6 and 27 February 2019.

== Career ==
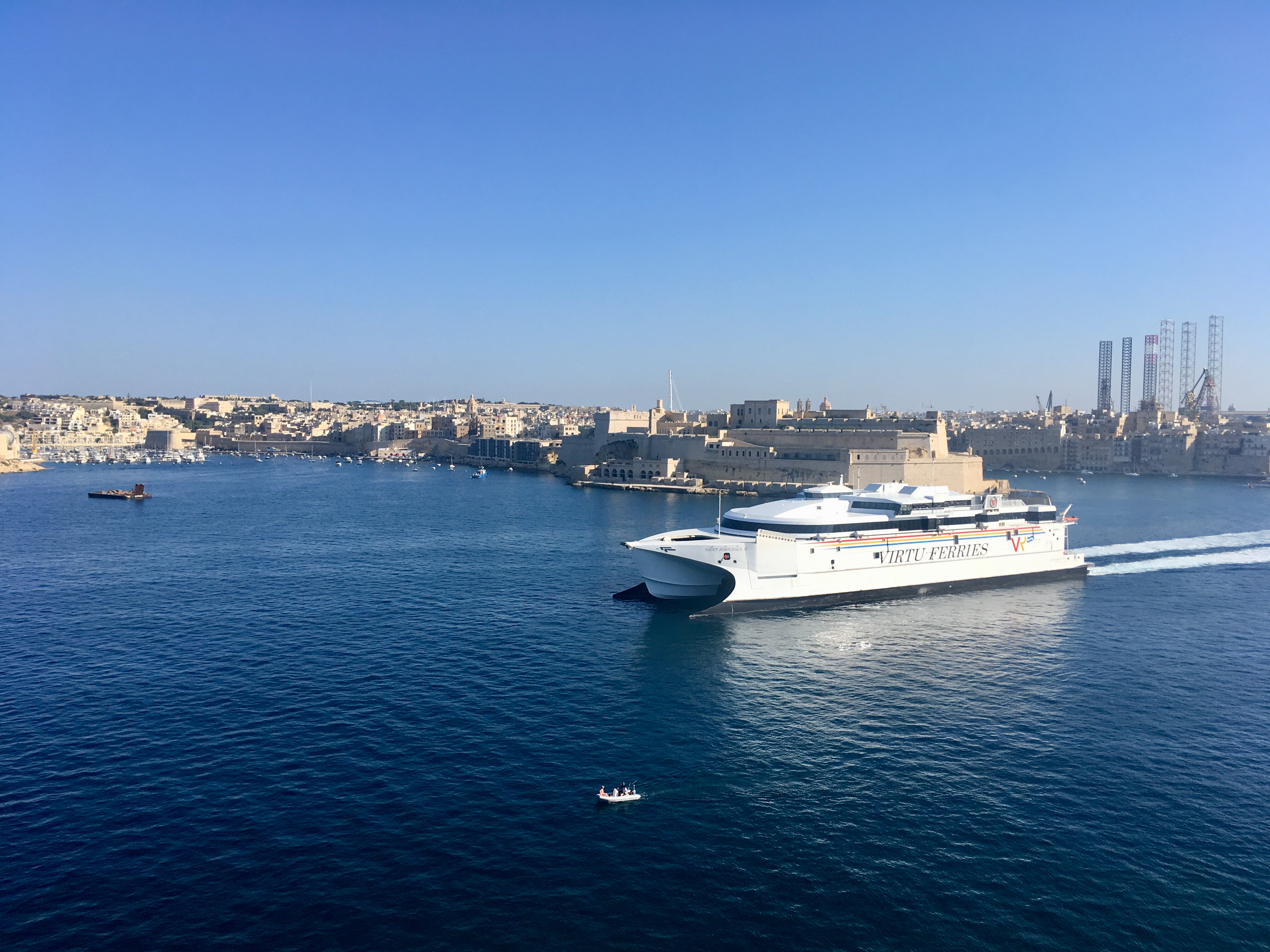
Saint John Paul II in Malta's Grand Harbour

The vessel entered service in March 2019, replacing the Jean de La Valette. An open day was held on 10 March 2019, and 9,000 people visited the vessel. MaltaPost installed a mailbox on board the catamaran on 11 March 2019, and mail posted there is marked as paquebot.

The vessel has been called a "significant ship" by the Royal Institution of Naval Architects.

During the COVID-19 pandemic in both Italy and Malta, the catamaran was still operating according to schedule but only commercial vehicles and their drivers were allowed on board. A limited number of repatriation trips allowing passengers to return to their home countries were organised in March 2020.
