= HSC Jean de La Valette =

High-speed catamaran built by Austal

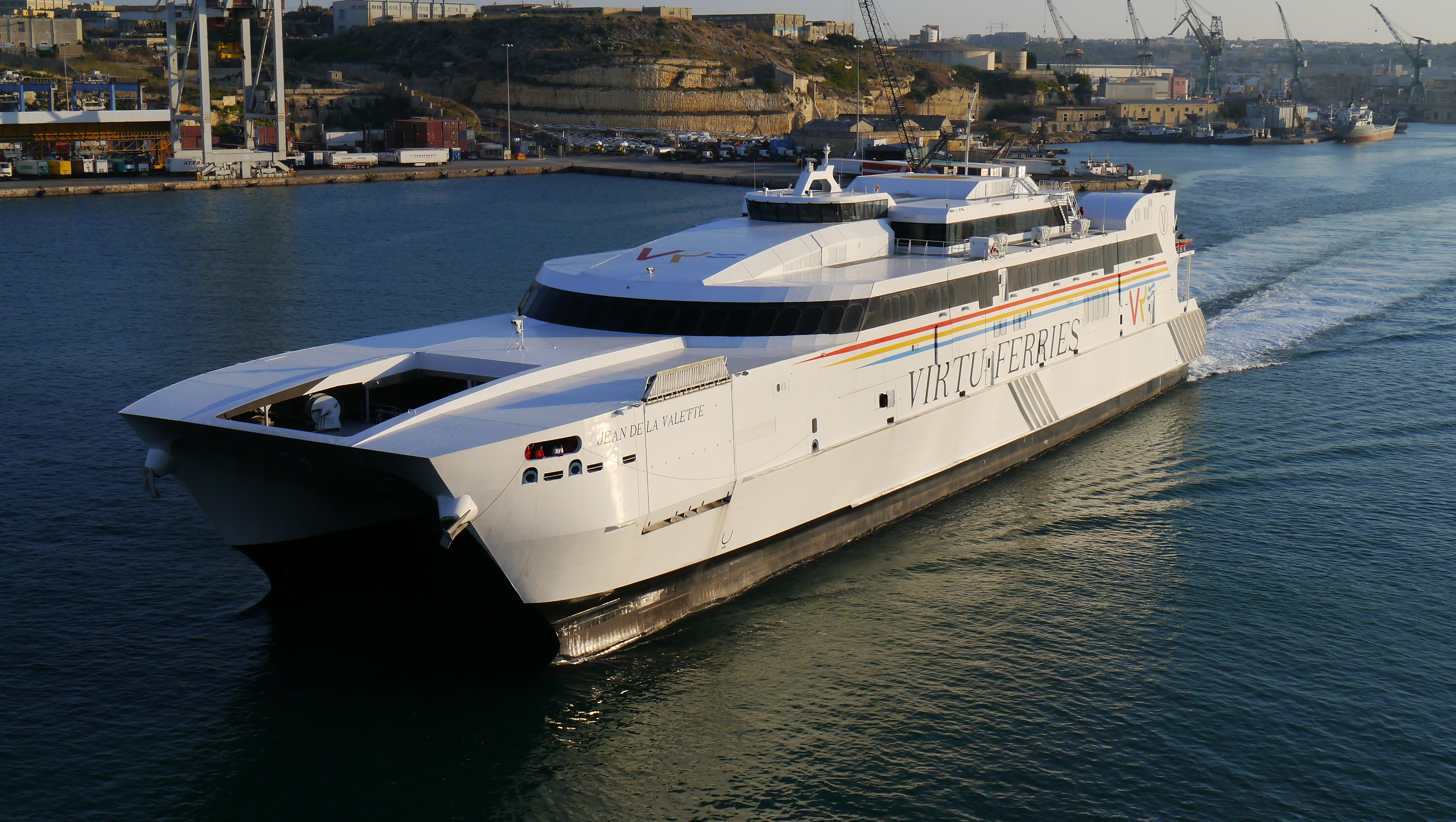
- Jean de La Valette departing Malta's Grand Harbour in 2012

History
- Name: 2010–present: Jean de La Valette
- Namesake: Named after Grand Master Jean Parisot de Valette
- Owner: 2010–present: Virtu Ferries
- Operator: 2010–2019: Virtu Ferries; 2019–2021: Trinidad and Tobago Inter-Island Ferry Service (Chartered); 2021–present: Virtu Ferries
- Port of registry: 2010–present: Valletta, Malta
- Route: Valletta – Pozzallo / Catania; Former: Port of Spain – Scarborough
- Ordered: April 2009
- Builder: Austal; Henderson, Australia
- Yard number: 338
- Laid down: 2009
- Launched: 25 April 2010
- Completed: August 2010
- Acquired: 2010
- Maiden voyage: 4 October 2010
- In service: 2010
- Identification: IMO number: 9559743; Call sign: 9HA2063; MMSI number: 249898000
- Status: in service

General characteristics
- Class & type: Austal Auto Express 107
- Tonnage: 6,894 GT; 850 DWT
- Length: 106.50 m (349 ft 5 in) (overall) / 92.40 m (303 ft 2 in) (waterline)
- Beam: 23.80 m (78 ft 1 in)
- Draught: 4.90 m (16 ft 1 in)
- Depth: 9.40 m (30 ft 10 in)
- Decks: 2
- Ramps: Stern and port-side loading ramps
- Installed power: 4 × MTU 20V 8000 M71L main diesel engines (total 36,400 kW / 48,810 hp)
- Propulsion: 4 × Rolls-Royce KaMeWa 125 SIII waterjets
- Speed: 38.5 knots (71.3 km/h; 44.3 mph) (service) / 40.0 knots (74.1 km/h; 46.0 mph) (max)
- Capacity: 800 passengers; 230 cars or 342 truck lane metres + 45 cars
- Crew: 24

MV or HSC (Note: Most sources including Virtu Ferries use the prefix "MV" or "M/V" (for Motor vessel) when referring to the Jean de La Valette, but the prefix "HSC" (for High-speed craft) is also used.) Jean de La Valette is a high-speed catamaran ferry owned and operated by Virtu Ferries. Built by Austal, in Henderson, Western Australia in 2010, it is one of the largest vessels of its kind in the world. It operated routes from Malta to Pozzallo and Catania in Sicily, serving as a link between Malta and the rest of Europe, until it was replaced by the Saint John Paul II in March 2019. The vessel was leased to the Trinidad and Tobago Inter-Island Ferry Service between 2019 and 2021 to serve as an inter-island ferry between Port of Spain and Scarborough. The vessel then returned to Malta to operate on its original route.

== Description ==
When it was built, Jean de La Valette was the largest high-speed catamaran in the Mediterranean Sea and the second largest in the world. It has since been surpassed on both counts by another Virtu Ferries catamaran, the MV Saint John Paul II. It has an overall length of 106.5 m (349 ft) and a waterline length of 92.4 m (303 ft). Its beam is 23.8 m (78 ft), and the hull has a depth of 9.4 m (31 ft) and a draught of 4.9 m (16 ft). The hull is aluminium, and the vessel has a deadweight tonnage of 850 t (840 long tons; 940 short tons).

The vessel is propelled by four Kamewa 125SIII waterjets, and its main engines are four MTU 20V 8000 M71L4 diesel engines. It has a capacity of 335,000 L (74,000 imp gal; 88,000 US gal) of fuel. The vessel's service speed is approximately 39 kn (72 km/h; 45 mph).

The vessel could accommodate 24 crew members and 800 passengers. It has two decks, and each includes some outdoor seating. A separate first class area includes lounges and several other amenities. The vessel has a capacity of 230 cars, or 342 truck lane metres and 45 cars. A stern ramp and a port-side ramp allow vehicles to be loaded and unloaded.

== Construction ==
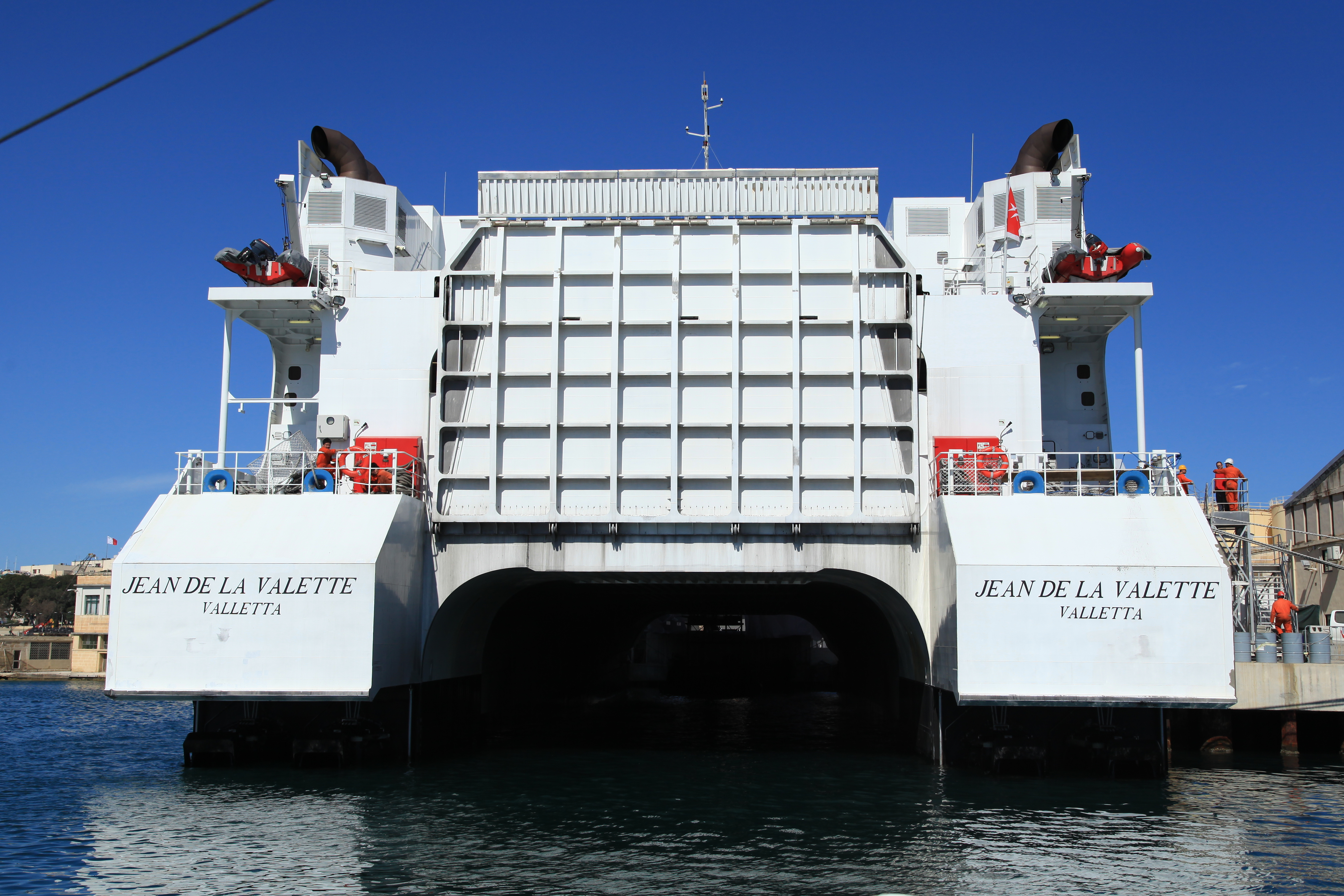
The vessel as viewed from the stern

Virtu Ferries ordered Jean de La Valette in April 2009, in order to allow for an increased amount of passenger and cargo traffic between Malta and Sicily. It was built by Austal in Henderson, Western Australia, and it was fabricated in modular blocks which were then fitted out together, since the vessel was larger than the hall it was constructed in. The vessel was constructed in accordance with Det Norske Veritas safety requirements.

The catamaran was almost complete by March 2010 and it was launched on 25 April, with sea trials commencing in June. It was delivered from Australia to Malta in a two-week voyage under its own power between August and September 2010. During this voyage, the vessel was chased by four pirate skiffs near the Bab-el-Mandeb in the Red Sea, but it easily managed to outrun them.

== Career ==
=== Malta–Sicily ferry ===
The vessel commenced operations on 4 October 2010, becoming the flagship of Virtu Ferries and replacing the catamaran MV Maria Dolores which had been in service since 2006. It operated on the Malta-Pozzallo and Malta-Catania routes, which took 90 minutes and three hours respectively. Multiple trips were made daily, with the vessel making 1006 Malta-Sicily trips in 2017.

The vessel was depicted on a Maltese postage stamp which was issued on 10 August 2011. MaltaPost installed a mailbox on board the catamaran on 7 November 2011, and mail posted there was marked as paquebot.

On 6 August 2015, the catamaran collided into a pier at Pozzallo and it was temporarily out of service for about a week until the necessary repairs were made. The vessel continued to operate the Malta-Sicily route until the larger catamaran MV Saint John Paul II entered into service in March 2019.

=== Trinidad–Tobago ferry ===
When Jean de La Valette ceased operations on the Malta-Sicily route, the vessel underwent a refit at Cádiz in Spain. Meanwhile, Virtu Ferries was declared as the preferred bidder for a tender issued by the Government of Trinidad and Tobago for an inter-island ferry as a temporary replacement for the T&T Express. NIDCO and port authority officials visited Malta to examine the vessel in late February 2019, and Virtu Ferries and NIDCO signed the charter party agreement on 16 May 2019. The catamaran is to operate in Trinidad and Tobago for one year until two new ferries arrive in the islands, with the possibility of an extension by a further six months. It is to be crewed and maintained by Virtu Ferries staff from Malta, along with 14 caterers and cleaners from Trinidad and Tobago. The lease of the ferry was controversial, as the opposition party United National Congress questioned the vessel's procurement process and protested at the daily lease cost of €34,500 (approximately equivalent to TT$263,580), which is higher than that of other leased ferries.

Jean de La Valette left Spain on 14 June, and after a stop in Cape Verde it arrived in Trinidad on 19 June. The catamaran entered service on 18 July 2019. On the return trip after the inaugural voyage, minor technical problems caused the vessel to return to port to undergo repairs. The vessel's route between Port of Spain and Scarborough takes around two and a half to three hours.

During the COVID-19 pandemic in 2020, the vessel's capacity was reduced to 350 passengers in order to allow for social distancing on board.

The lease on the vessel concluded on 1 February 2021 and the vessel was prepared for its return journey to Malta. Meanwhile the government of Trinidad and Tobago thanked Virtu ferries for the 'invaluable' service the vessel provided for the past 18 months.

=== Return to Malta ===
In July 2020, whilst the vessel was still under charter to Trinidad and Tobago, Virtu ferries announced that the Malta to Sicily route will be operated by two vessels in the first quarter of 2021. This is due to the increased demand of importers/exporters between the islands. The flagship, Saint John Paul II operates from Valletta to Pozzallo while Jean De La Valette operates from Valletta to Augusta and/or Catania.

The vessel restarted the Valletta - Pozzallo route on 6 April 2021 with a morning trip leaving Malta at 5:00 am.
