= BGV =

Proposed high-speed ferry

BGV or Bateau à Grande Vitesse is a concept of high speed ship, to be developed in France, capable of travelling up to 65 knots or 120 km/h.

The concept is based on the original idea of Gilles Vaton, who modified trimarans to achieve reduced drag and stability at high speeds.

There were proposals to use BGVs (equipped to carry both passenger and freight) between France and UK in time for the 2012 Summer Olympics in London. UK based Chikara Shipping Ltd claimed to be buying BGVs, launching of fast services on the Boulogne maritime hub system linking Norway, the UK and Spain, but pulled out of the deal in late 2007. The first sailings were scheduled for 2008. This business plan was revealed to be fraudulent; the ferries have not entered service, investors have lost money, and the boss of Chikara Shipping fled.
