= Virtu Ferries =

Maltese ferry company

- Founded: 1988
- Headquarters: Marsa, Malta
- Area served: Malta Channel; Adriatic Sea
- Services: Passenger and vehicle transportation
- Owner: Virtu Holdings
- Subsidiaries: Venezia Lines
- Website: www.virtuferries.com/

Virtu Ferries is a Maltese company founded in 1988 that operates ferry services from Malta to Sicily by catamaran. The company is part of the Virtu Holdings. It has a subsidiary Venezia Lines which runs seasonal services from Venice. It carries over 250,000 passengers and 25,000 vehicles annually. In 2010 the MV Jean de La Valette replaced the Maria Dolores as the flagship, and it carries about 800 passengers and 200 vehicles. It operates the Valletta - Pozzallo route across the Malta Channel, almost daily all-year round. Virtu Ferries currently operates exclusively catamarans. All vessels fly the Maltese flag.

== Fleet ==
=== Current fleet ===
Image	Ship	Length	Passengers	Route	Notes
	Saint John Paul II	110m	900	Valletta - Pozzallo	(Incat Hull 089) Flagship entered into service in March 2019 on the Valletta - Pozzallo route
	Jean de La Valette	106.5m	800	Valletta - Pozzallo	Malta - Sicily route
	Maria Dolores	68.4m	600	Tarifa - Tangiers	On charter to Inter Shipping
	San Frangisk	35.25m	317	Valletta - Mġarr, Gozo	Operated for Virtu Ferries Gozo
	HSC Gozo Express	42.2m	322	Valletta - Mġarr, Gozo	Operated for Virtu Ferries Gozo; Newly built catamaran for virtu ferries

=== Former fleet ===
Image	Ship	In service	Current status
	San Pawl	2001-2025	Sold to Islands Unlimited

== Venezia Lines ==
Venezia Lines is a subsidiary which operates various services in the Adriatic Sea. It was founded in 2001 and ran its first service in May 2003. It runs a six-month seasonal service between April and October on the following routes in the North Adriatic:

- Venice - Piran
- Venice - Poreč
- Venice - Pula
- Venice - Rabac
- Venice - Rovinj
