= FastCat =

FastCat may refer to:

- FastCat Ryde
- FastCat Shanklin
- Archipelago Philippine Ferries Corporation, a ferry company which operates as FastCat since 2013 after its catamaran fleet.
- Fast Ferry Scandal, also known as the FastCat Fiasco, a political scandal involving the British Columbia provincial government and BC Ferries.
