= Ocean Fast Ferries =

Filipino corporation that operates high-speed craft

OceanJet Fast Ferries, Inc.
- Formerly: Socor Shipping Lines
- Type: Private
- Industry: Ferry Services
- Founded: 1995; 31 years ago
- Headquarters: Pier 1, Warehouse Building, North Reclamation Area, Cebu City, Philippines
- Area served: Philippines
- Website: oceanjet.net

OceanJet Fast Ferries, Inc. is a wholly owned Filipino corporation that operates high-speed crafts commonly known as OceanJet, serving destinations in the Visayas, Luzon region in the Philippines.

== History ==
The company started in the late 1990s as Socor Shipping Line, operating one vessel, the M/V Oceanjet 1. The company was not aggressive to expansion until 2001, when the company acquired their second vessel, M/V Oceanjet 2. In the same year, the company changed their name into Ocean Fast Ferries Corporation. They acquired 3 new ships from 2001 to 2003: the sister ships Oceanjet 3, Oceanjet 5 and Oceanjet 6, all built in Hong Kong.

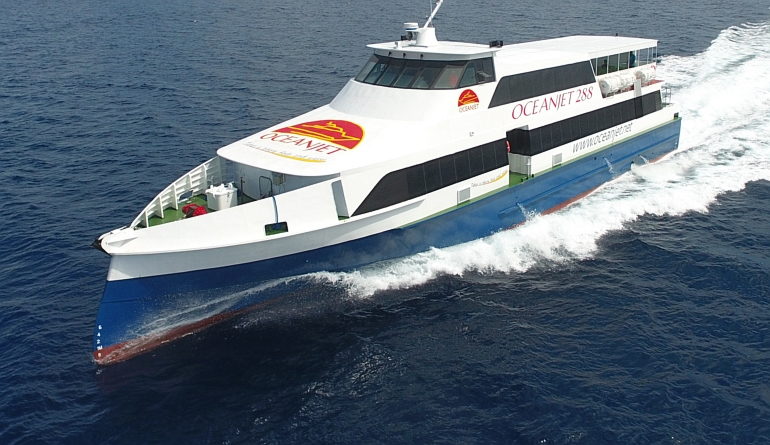
OceanJet 288

Starting 2011, the company continued their expansion, with the arrival of Ocean Jet 8 into service. She was the first among the ships acquired by the company to be designed by Global Marine Design, based in Australia, who manufactured the marine kits of these ships, which were later assembled here in the Philippines by Golden Dragon Shipyard, located in Mandaue, Cebu.

As of September 2024, the company is serving 13 destinations, and has a fleet of 17 vessels.

== Destinations ==
The company serves 13 different destinations, namely:

- Bacolod City, Negros Occidental
- Batangas City
- Calapan City, Oriental Mindoro
- Cebu City
- Dapitan City
- Dumaguete City
- Getafe, Bohol
- Iloilo City
- Ormoc City
- Palompon, Leyte
- Siaton, Negros Oriental
- Siquijor, Siquijor
- Tagbilaran City, Bohol
- Maasin City, Southern Leyte
- Surigao City, Surigao del Norte
- Loon, Bohol

Former destinations include:

• Poro, Cebu

• Tabuelan, Cebu

• Estancia, Iloilo

• Dapitan, Zamboanga Del Norte

• Plaridel, Misamis Occidental

== Routes ==
Oceanjet presently operates in the following routes:

- Cebu-Ormoc & Vice Versa
- Cebu-Palompon & Vice Versa
- Cebu-Tagbilaran & Vice Versa
- Cebu-Tagbilaran-Dumaguete & Vice Versa
- Cebu-Tagbilaran-Siquijor-Dumaguete & Vice Versa
- Cebu-Loon & Vice Versa
- Cebu-Getafe & Vice Versa
- Cebu-Maasin-Surigao & Vice Versa
- Dumaguete-Siquijor & Vice Versa
- Bacolod-Iloilo & Vice Versa
- Batangas-Calapan & Vice Versa
- Dapitan-Siaton & Vice Versa

== Fleet ==
The company operates a total of 17 vessels, a mix of monohulls and catamarans, making them the largest operator of high-speed crafts in the Visayas region.

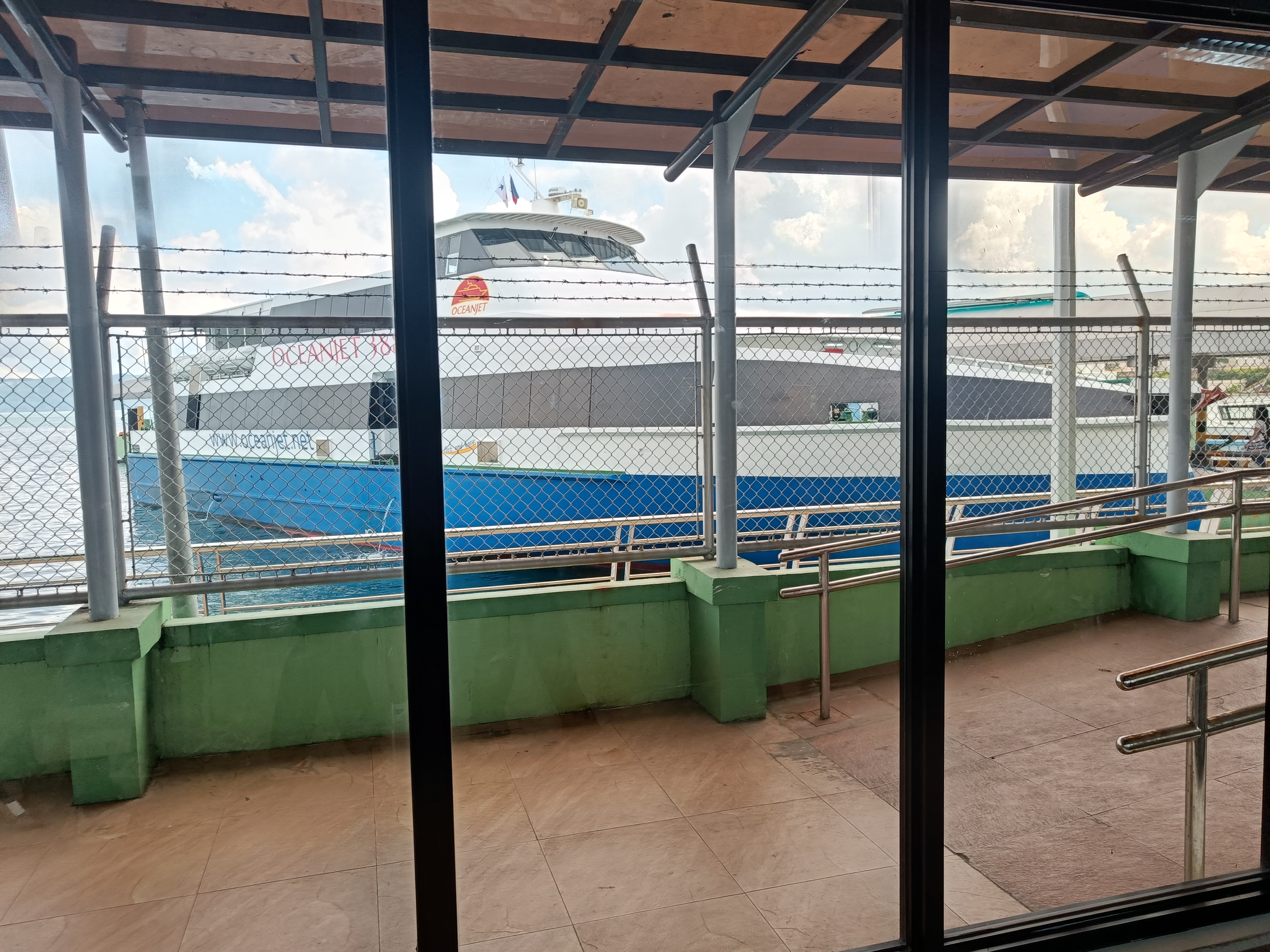
Oceanjet 388 at the Port of Tagbilaran

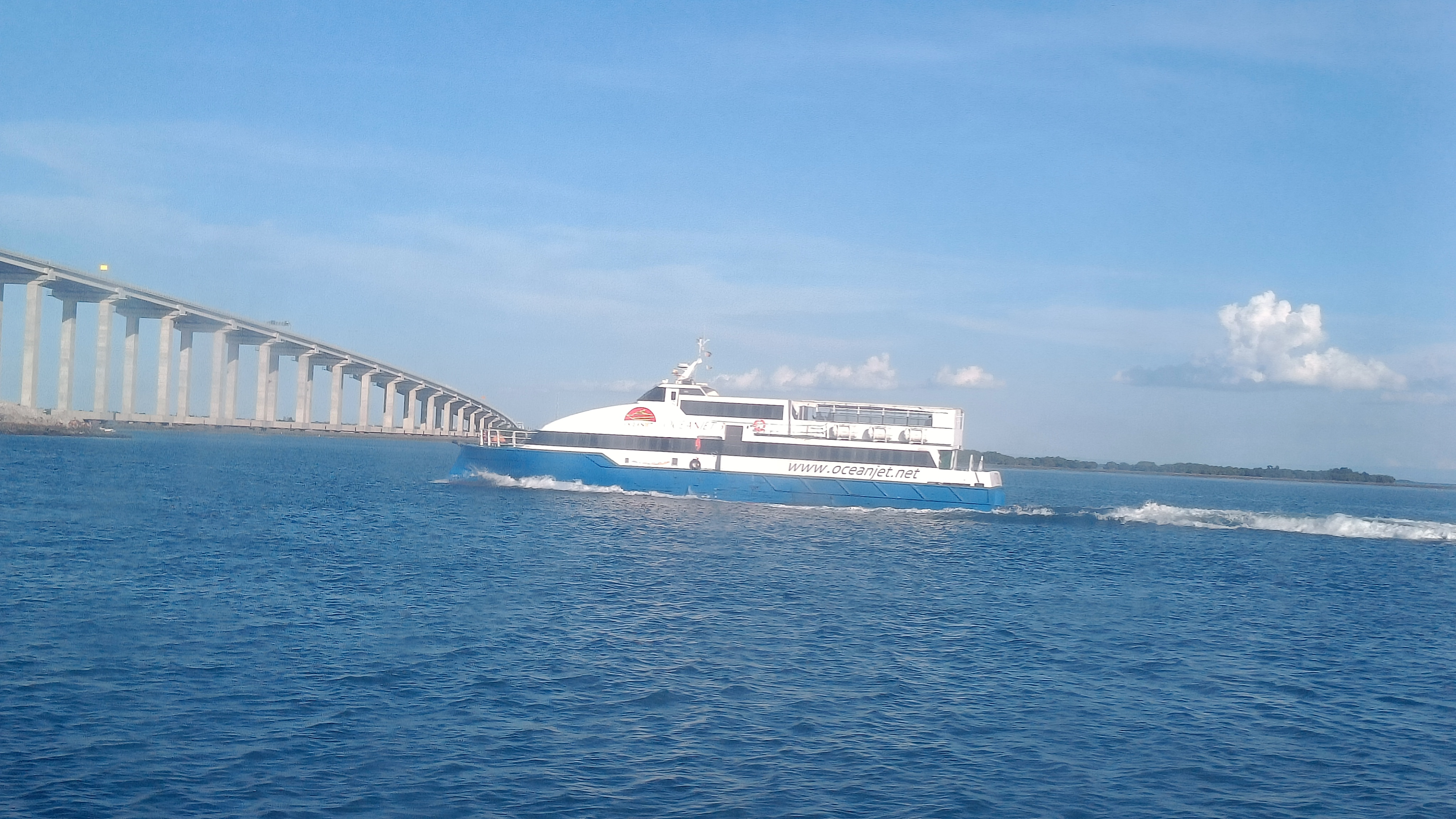
Oceanjet 3

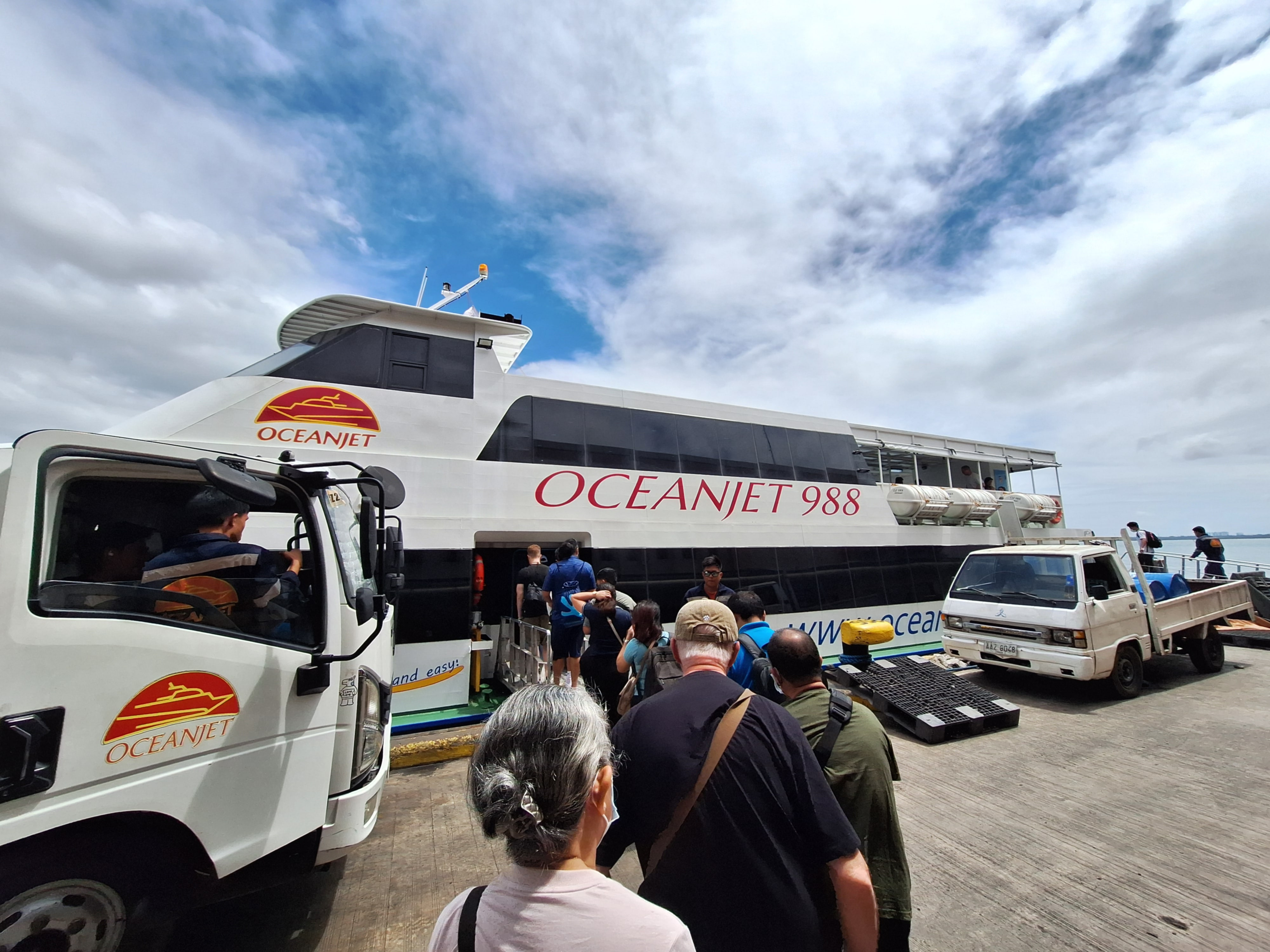
Oceanjet 988 docked at Cebu Pier 1

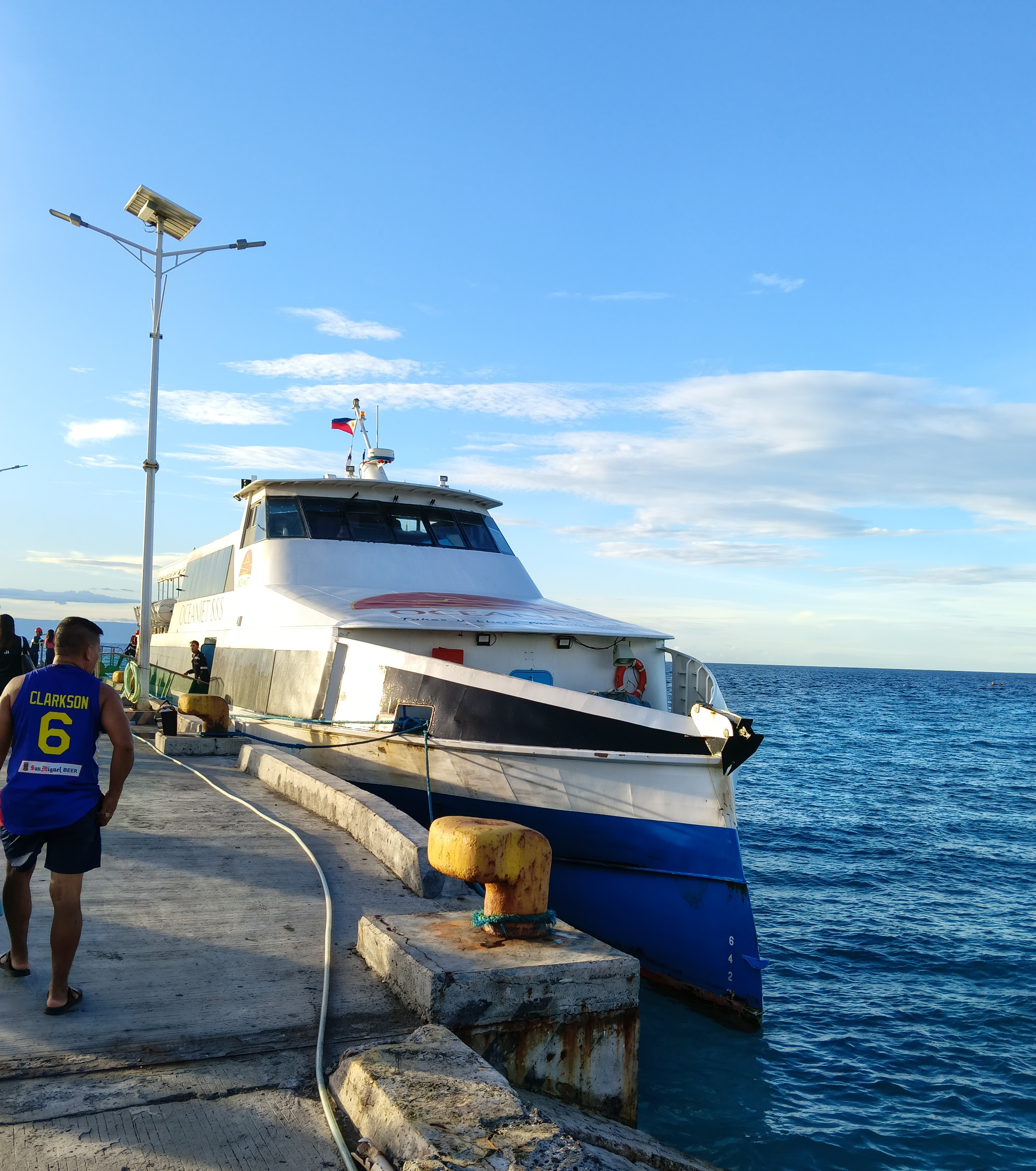
Oceanjet 888 at the Port of Siquijor

OceanJet vessels
Name	IMO	Total Seats	Built	Notes
Oceanjet 1		208	1985	A monohull bought from Japan.
Oceanjet 2	8823197	241	1989	A monohull bought from Japan.
Oceanjet 3	8979398	332	2001	These 3 sister ships were built by Cheoy Lee Shipyards in Hong Kong.
Oceanjet 5	8979403	332	2002	These 3 sister ships were built by Cheoy Lee Shipyards in Hong Kong.
Oceanjet 6	8979415	332	2003	These 3 sister ships were built by Cheoy Lee Shipyards in Hong Kong.
Oceanjet 7	7908990	338	1979	Acquired in 2010, a Westermoen Westamaran (catamaran), and the company's first catamaran.
Ocean Jet 8	8664058	352	2011	These vessels were designed by Global Marine Design in Australia, and were assembled in Mandaue City by Golden Dragon Shipyard.; Ocean Jet 188 was the first to feature an Axe Bow design, followed by Ocean Jet 288. Later on, existing vessels were retrofitted with the bow design that enabled lower fuel consumption and a gain in sprint speed. New vessels would then sport the Axe Bow design.; Both Ocean Jet 788 and 988 can seat up to 357 passengers, but 10 seats were removed to make way for a baggage area. With both vessels being the latest additions to their fleet, they installed foam on all their tourist class seats which are made from synthetic rattan.
Ocean Jet 88	9712929	357	2012	
Ocean Jet 888		357	2014	
Ocean Jet 168		357	2015	
Ocean Jet 188		357	2016	
Ocean Jet 288		357		
Ocean Jet 388		357		
Ocean Jet 588		357		
Ocean Jet 688		357		
Ocean Jet 788		347		
Ocean Jet 988		347	2024	
Ocean Jet 1088		347	TBA	
Oceanjet 9		290	1997	Formerly the M/V Paras Sea Cat, a catamaran.
Ocean Jet 10		288	1999	Formerly Lite Jet 8, a catamaran of the Lite Ferries/Lite Shipping Corporation.
Ocean Jet 11		172	1989	Formerly Lite Jet 1, a monohull ferry of the Lite Ferries/Lite Shipping Corporation.
Ocean Jet 12	9175341	332	1998	Formerly Lite Jet 9, a catamaran of the Lite Ferries/Lite Shipping Corporation. She was built by Afai Southern Shipyard in Guangzhou, China, and was previously the Aquan One (until 2001), and First Ferry I (until 2014).
Ocean Jet 15	9156711	203	1997	A monohull ferry acquired in 2016 from Japan.

== Accidents and incidents ==
- February 2, 2008: While approaching Tagbilaran Port, OceanJet 3 collided with a barge anchored in the waters off Tagbilaran. As the vessel was navigating the Tagbilaran Channel, it struck the barge, identified as Valerie, while making its way into port at around 8 PM. Of the 140 passengers on board, reports on the number of injured varied, with sources stating 23, 24, 28, or 31 injuries. Many of those injured sustained serious injuries, including broken bones. The fastcraft also suffered significant damage. Photos taken inside OceanJet 3 showed seats torn from their floor mounts, while the vessel itself sustained a one-meter dent to its bow.
- July 28, 2012: OceanJets 5 and 6 were involved in a double grounding incident. OceanJet 5 ran aground in Mactan Channel near Cordova while approaching Cebu City. The ferry had departed from Tagbilaran with 197 passengers and 13 crew members. According to its captain, as they neared the channel, a foreign vessel suddenly appeared, forcing him to maneuver to avoid a collision, consequently causing the ferry to hit a shallow area off Shell Island at around 8 PM. The crew then contacted its sister ship, OceanJet 6, to assist in transferring the passengers, only for it to run aground as well near Shell Island at around 11 PM. Ocean Fast Ferries Corp. then sent tugboats to the scene and enlisted the services of a motorized banca from Clemer Lines to transport the passengers to Pier 1. The 197 passengers were transferred in three batches, with the first arriving at 9:45 PM and the last at 11:02 PM. A tugboat successfully refloated OceanJet 6 at 12:33 AM, followed by OceanJet 5 approximately 10 minutes later. Both vessels were towed to Cebu City. One passenger recounted that the seas were rough midway through the trip but had calmed as they approached Cebu City. They were only taken by surprise when the vessel suddenly shook upon entering the Mactan Channel. It took 15 to 30 minutes for the captain to inform them of what had happened, but the crew did not provide immediate instructions. Some passengers, fearing the vessel had sustained damage, put on life jackets out of panic. When they demanded answers, the crew simply told them to remain calm. Since it was late in the evening, no free food was provided. No injuries were reported from the incident.
- September 28, 2017: A portion of OceanJet 7 was damaged after it rammed into a pier apron of Bredco port in Bacolod City. The vessel was having engine trouble when it arrived from Iloilo City with 155 passengers and 18 crew members. Fourteen people were injured.
- January 24, 2018: OceanJet 7 was damaged after it rammed into a pier apron of Bredco port in Bacolod City. The vessel was having engine trouble when it arrived from Iloilo City. Forty people were injured.
- March 11, 2018: While en route to Dumaguete, OceanJet 15 ran aground on a coral reef. The vessel departed Siquijor at 6:00 AM, but about two to three nautical miles from the port, the captain encountered four fishing boats in waters near Brgy. Tongo, Siquijor. In an effort to avoid a collision, he altered the vessel’s course, inadvertently causing it to hit the reef. The Philippine Coast Guard then deployed two rented motorized bancas to rescue the 32 passengers onboard. Bancas were chosen instead of a larger rescue vessel to prevent another grounding incident. OceanJet management refunded the tickets of all the passengers, who were in turn transferred to another fast craft bound for Dumaguete. PCG then required OceanJet to submit their marine protest, for the sake of having a formal statement on the incident.
- January 6, 2020: While en route to Tagbilaran City from Plaridel, OceanJet 7 encountered big waves brought by strong winds. This drove the vessel off course causing it to run aground approximately 1.5 kilometers off the Port of Plaridel, resting on the starboard side of its hull. The Philippine Coast Guard dispatched a rescue vessels to the scene and brought back 271 passengers and 17 crew to Plaridel Port. A tug was dispatched to help refloat the vessel and take it under tow back to port.
- December 16, 2021: Super Typhoon Odette, internationally known as Typhoon Rai, made landfall in Cebu at approximately 10:00 PM. Four of OceanJet's vessels, namely OceanJet 1, OceanJet 288, OceanJet 388, and OceanJet 588, were moored at Cebu Pier 1 during the typhoon. Images showed the vessels stacked on top of one another like toys, with two vessels' bows already resting on the pier itself. All sustained heavy damage and were partially submerged as a result of the huge waves brought by the typhoon. The vessels were salvaged one by one and were repaired at Golden Dragon Shipyard in Mandaue, Cebu, which is also owned by OceanJet Fast Ferries, Inc.
- March 20, 2022: In a Facebook post that went viral, it narrates the account of the crew of OceanJet 88 rescuing a fisherman in distress. While en route to Cebu City during stormy weather, the captain of OceanJet 88 noticed a fisherman in the water floating alongside his partially submerged banca. They slowed down, approached the fisherman, then cast a life vest towards him. They then secured a line and towed the banca towards the Camotes Islands. On a separate post by one of OceanJet 88's crew members, it shows a video of the vessel in the vicinity of Tulang Island with the fisherman and his partially submerged banca at the stern of the ship. The fisherman was given and made to keep the life vest, then transferred to another banca that was there to meet them by jumping into the water and then climbing onto the other banca. Once the crew confirmed the fisherman was safe on the other banca, they slowly departed as they resumed their trip to Cebu. A bigger banca can be seen approaching in the distance to provide assistance. Comments say that the fisherman was out in the open when he got caught in a squall.
- September 9, 2022: OceanJet 168 struck a coral reef off the coast of Panglao en route to Siquijor from Tagbilaran. The vessel stopped for a brief moment, then returned to Tagbilaran. The vessel sustained damage to its starboard-side propeller. Following the incident, a provincial board member, who was onboard during the incident, expressed dismay over OceanJet’s alleged “lack of protocol and accountability” as passengers were never informed on what happened. The Marina suspended the Passenger Ship Safety Certificate of the vessel pending an inspection to be conducted by the agency to determine its seaworthiness. They also suspended the captain indefinitely due to the incident.
- November 21, 2022: The Philippine Coast Guard rescued a 58 year old fisherman after his fishing boat collided with OceanJet 688. The OceanJet vessel had just departed from Tagbilaran City and was still travelling at low speed when it rammed the fisherman's banca. Following the impact, OceanJet 688 immediately stopped to check on the fisherman. The fisherman did not sustain injuries but his banca was damaged. The Ocean Jetcrew alerted the PCG substation in Tagbilaran City. PCG noted that the area was off-limits for fishing as it is a passageway for larger boats. The fisherman and OceanJet reached a settlement and the company offered to pay for the banca.
- January 20, 2023: While en route to Cebu City from Tagbilaran, the crew of OceanJet 8 rescues a fisherman in distress. The fisherman was found in the water alongside his banca which was mostly submerged. The crew tossed a lifebuoy to the fisherman. OceanJet commended the crew's action by sharing a Facebook post of a netizen who recorded the incident.
- January 31, 2024: OceanJet 6 collides with water taxi Hop & Go 1, killing its captain and third mate. The collision occurred when OceanJet 6 was sailing outbound from Batangas bound for Calapan while Hop & Go 1 was travelling inbound to Batangas from Puerto Galera. Images showed extensive damage to the water taxi with its front apparently ripped open. It remained afloat and was being towed to Puerto Galera. Images of the scene appeared to be gray, possibly indicating misty or foggy weather. The water taxi was carrying a total of five passengers: four Chinese passengers, with two suffering injuries as a result of the collision, and one Swedish passenger during the incident. None of OceanJet's 115 passengers and 19 crew members were injured.
- February 23, 2024: At 11:50 AM, port police at PMO Bohol reached out to the Philippine Coast Guard after receiving a report of a missing crew member onboard OceanJet 888 which was currently underway to Cebu City from Tagbilaran. Upon reviewing CCTV footage, it has been discovered that the missing crew member slipped and fell overboard and was killed by the propeller while the vessel was performing an undocking maneuver at 11:06 AM. It was mentioned that while the vessel was undocking, the crew member was at the back portion of the vessel arranging luggage prior to the incident. At around 12:20 PM., chopped-up remains were seen floating around the ship’s berth as a result of the crew member getting sucked and minced by the ship’s propeller.
