= SSTH Ocean Arrow =

Twin hull ferry in Japan

History
- In service: 1998
- Identification: IMO number: 9164433; MMSI number: 431000569; Callsign: JM6586

General characteristics
- Tonnage: 1,687 GT (JG)
- Length: 72.09 m (236.5 ft) LOA
- Installed power: 28,000 kW (38,000 hp)
- Speed: 35 knots (65 km/h; 40 mph) (service); 40 knots (74 km/h; 46 mph) (max.)
- Range: 950 nautical miles (1,760 km; 1,090 mi)

SSTH Ocean Arrow is a super slender twin hull (SSTH) car ferry operating in Japan. Prof. Hideaki Miyata at Tokyo University developed the SSTH, a high-speed catamaran-hulled boat, as a joint work with IHI Corporation.

It entered service in 1998 between Kumamoto and Shimabara. The trip takes about 30 minutes, or about half the time that it had previously taken.

Despite their prevalence in Europe, previous attempts to bring a fast ferry to Japan had failed due to wake wash and wave damage in the Japanese coastal areas. In Ireland, a swimmer was drowned in one instance which was thought to be caused by wake wash from a fast-moving ferry.
