= Gosport Borough Council elections =

Local government elections in Hampshire, England

Half of Gosport Borough Council in Hampshire, England is elected every two years. Until 2002 the council was elected by thirds.

== Election results ==
Composition of the council
Year	Conservative	Labour	Reform	Liberal Democrats (Note: Includes totals for the predecessors of the Liberal Democrats, the Liberal Party and SDP (both of which participated in the Alliance).)	Independents & Others	Council control after election
Local government reorganisation; council established (33 seats)
1973	9	19	–	0	5	Labour
1976	18	8	–	0	7	Conservative
New ward boundaries (30 seats)
1979	25	2	–	0	3	Conservative
1980	19	5	–	1	5	Conservative
1982	19	5	–	1	5	Conservative
1983	22	3	–	2	3	Conservative
1984	24	3	–	3	0	Conservative
1986	20	4	–	6	0	Conservative
1987	19	5	–	6	0	Conservative
1988	17	5	–	8	0	Conservative
1990	12	5	–	12	1	No overall control
1991	7	4	–	17	2	Liberal Democrats
1992	8	3	–	17	2	Liberal Democrats
1994	7	3	–	17	3	Liberal Democrats
1995	5	5	–	18	2	Liberal Democrats
1996	4	7	–	17	2	Liberal Democrats
1998	9	10	–	3	8	No overall control
1999	10	11	–	7	2	No overall control
2000	13	11	–	6	0	No overall control
New ward boundaries (34 seats) (Note: Changed from one-third to half council elections)
2002	10	12	–	12	0	No overall control
2004	15	11	–	6	2	No overall control
2006	17	8	–	9	0	No overall control
2008	16	4	–	14	0	No overall control
2010	22	3	–	8	1	Conservative
2012	24	5	–	5	0	Conservative
2014	21	6	–	6	1 (Note: 1 UKIP)	Conservative
2016	20	4	–	9	1	Conservative
2018	18	2	–	14	0	Conservative
2021	19	1	–	14	0	No overall control
New ward boundaries (28 seats)
2022	10	2	–	16	0	Liberal Democrats
2024	10	3 (Note: The seat in Grange and Alver Valley was elected at a by-election in July 2024, following a vacancy created by the death of the incumbent councillor in April 2024.)	–	15	0	Liberal Democrats
2026	11	0	10	6	1	No overall control

== Borough result maps ==
2002 results map

2004 results map

2006 results map

2008 results map

2010 results map

2012 results map

2014 results map

2016 results map

2018 results map

2021 results map

2022 results map

2024 results map

2026 results map

== By-election results ==
=== 1994-1998 ===
Rowner By-Election 19 September 1996
Party	Candidate	Votes	%	±%
Labour		908	51.1	
Conservative		620	34.9	
Liberal Democrats		249	14.0	
Majority		288	16.2	
Turnout		1,777	29.1	
Labour hold		Swing		

Rowner By-Election 8 May 1997
Party	Candidate	Votes	%	±%
Labour		931	48.9	
Conservative		763	40.1	
Liberal Democrats		210	11.0	
Majority		168	8.8	
Turnout		1,904		
Labour hold		Swing		

Brockhurst By-Election 30 October 1997
Party	Candidate	Votes	%	±%
Labour		427	36.1	+7.8
Ind. Lib Dem		423	35.8	+35.8
Conservative		221	18.7	−2.6
Liberal Democrats		111	9.4	−41.0
Majority		4	0.3	
Turnout		1,182		
Labour gain from Liberal Democrats		Swing		

=== 1998-2002 ===
Leesland By-Election 29 October 1998
Party	Candidate	Votes	%	±%
Liberal Democrats		797	57.2	+22.2
Conservative		402	28.9	−6.4
Labour		194	13.9	−2.5
Majority		395	28.3	
Turnout		1,393	25.0	
Liberal Democrats hold		Swing		

Alverstoke By-Election 12 September 2002
Party	Candidate	Votes	%	±%
Conservative		907	65.6	−3.0
Labour		412	29.8	+21.1
Liberal Democrats		63	4.5	−18.2
Majority		495	35.8	
Turnout		1,382	39.6	
Conservative hold		Swing		

Privett By-Election 21 August 2003
Party	Candidate	Votes	%	±%
Conservative	Colin Jacobs	603	48.4	+7.7
Liberal Democrats	Austin Hicks	485	38.9	−7.8
Labour	Gayle Batterbury	158	12.7	+0.0
Majority		118	9.5	
Turnout		1,246	38.0	
Conservative gain from Liberal Democrats		Swing		

=== 2002-2006 ===
Town By-Election 2 August 2007
Party	Candidate	Votes	%	±%
Labour	Diane Searle	480	41.7	−19.8
Conservative	Adam Burns	320	27.8	+0.9
Liberal Democrats	Heather Carr	200	17.4	+5.8
Independent	Brian Hart	71	6.2	+6.2
English Democrat	Robert Shaw	50	4.3	+4.3
Green	Jane Staffieri	31	2.7	+2.7
Majority		160	13.9	
Turnout		1,152	32.5	
Labour hold		Swing		

Brockhurst By-Election 9 July 2009
Party	Candidate	Votes	%	±%
Liberal Democrats	Robert Hylands	562		
Liberal Democrats	Siobhan Mitchell-Smith	523		
Conservative	Justin Henshaw	364		
Conservative	Brian Taylor	339		
Green	Claire Smith	131		
Labour	Joe O'Gorman	60		
Labour	Michael O'Gorman	56		
Turnout		2,035	28.2	
Liberal Democrats hold		Swing		
Liberal Democrats hold		Swing		

=== 2014-2018 ===
Bridgemary North By-Election 30 November 2017
Party	Candidate	Votes	%	±%
Liberal Democrats	Stephen Hammond	644	58.0	+58.0
Labour	James Fox	255	23.0	−49.0
Conservative	Richard Dickson	212	19.1	−8.9
Majority		389	35.0	
Turnout		1,111		
Liberal Democrats gain from Labour		Swing		

=== 2018-2022 ===
Brockhurst By-Election 30 May 2019
Party	Candidate	Votes	%	±%
Liberal Democrats	Siobhan Mitchell	488	51.5	+10.3
Conservative	Pecs Uluiviti	214	22.6	−12.2
Union & Sovereignty	Simion James Bellford	165	17.4	+17.4
Labour	Kristy Anne Smillie	80	8.4	−4.7
Majority		274	28.9	
Turnout		947		
Liberal Democrats hold		Swing		

=== 2022-2026 ===
Grange and Alver Valley By-Election 4 July 2024
Party	Candidate	Votes	%	±%
Labour	Jonathan Brown	749	38.6	+0.6
Conservative	Robbie Beech	639	33.0	−11.5
Liberal Democrats	Clive Foster-Reed	307	15.8	−1.8
Independent	Dale Fletcher	243	12.5	N/A
Majority		110	5.6	
Turnout		1938	42.9	
Labour gain from Conservative				

Harbourside and Town Ward By-Election 21 November 2024
Party	Candidate	Votes	%	±%
Conservative	Lesley Meenaghan	445	48.5	+10.6
Labour	Tynan Bryant	255	27.8	−12.8
Liberal Democrats	Mike Ewin	108	11.8	+3.4
Reform	Paddy Bergin	85	9.3	N/A
Independent	Dale Fletcher	13	1.4	N/A
Heritage	Lisa Englefield	11	1.2	N/A
Majority		274	28.9	
Turnout		917	20.7	+23.3
Conservative gain from Labour		Swing		

Bridgemary Ward By-Election 15 January 2026
Party	Candidate	Votes	%	±%
Reform	Paul Carter	604	42.5	
Liberal Democrats	Stephen Marshall	575	40.5	
Conservative	Kath Jones	207	14.6	
Labour	Claire Percival	35	2.46	
Turnout		1,421		
Reform gain from Liberal Democrats		Swing		
