= 2000 Gosport Borough Council election =

English local election

Elections to Gosport Borough Council were held on 4 May 2000. One third of the council was up for election and the council stayed under no overall control. Overall turnout was 29%.

After the election, the composition of the council was

- Conservative 13
- Labour 11
- Liberal Democrat 6

== Election result ==
Gosport local election result 2000
Party	Seats	Gains	Losses	Net gain/loss	Seats %	Votes %	Votes	+/−
Conservative	6			+3	60.0	50.6	8,368	
Labour	3			0	30.0	28.2	4,658	
Liberal Democrats	1			-1	10.0	21.2	3,503	
Others	0			-2	0	0	0	

== Ward results ==
Alverstoke
Party	Candidate	Votes	%	±%
Conservative	Peter Gibson	786	52.9	
Liberal Democrats	Alexander Bone	568	38.2	
Labour	Brian Forhead	131	8.8	
Majority		218	14.7	
Turnout		1,485	99	

Anglesey
Party	Candidate	Votes	%	±%
Conservative	Aleck Hayward	1,315	68.3	
Liberal Democrats	Clive Pearce	476	24.7	
Labour	Charis Jeffrey	135	7.0	
Majority		839	43.6	
Turnout		1,926		
Conservative hold		Swing		

Bridgemary
Party	Candidate	Votes	%	±%
Labour	Marilyn Angus	854	69.3	
Conservative	Joanne Watts	379	30.7	
Majority		475	38.6	
Turnout		1,233		
Labour hold		Swing		

Brockhurst
Party	Candidate	Votes	%	±%
Labour	Jean Batterbury	648	44.1	
Liberal Democrats	Peter Chegwyn	491	33.4	
Conservative	John Burrowa	331	22.5	
Majority		157	10.7	
Turnout		1,470		

Elson
Party	Candidate	Votes	%	±%
Conservative	Bruce Rigg	711	48.1	
Liberal Democrats	David Smith	545	36.8	
Labour	Brian Leishman	223	15.1	
Majority		166	11.3	
Turnout		1,479		

Hardway and Forton
Party	Candidate	Votes	%	±%
Conservative	Roger Allen	634	42.8	
Labour	Kenneth Searle	601	40.5	
Liberal Democrats	Dale Low	248	16.7	
Majority		33	2.3	
Turnout		1,483		
Conservative gain from Labour		Swing		

Lee
Party	Candidate	Votes	%	±%
Conservative	Derek Kimber	1,721	77.7	
Liberal Democrats	David Fisher	292	13.2	
Labour	Paul Wilson-Schofield	201	9.1	
Majority		1,429	64.5	
Turnout		2,214		
Conservative hold		Swing		

Leesland
Party	Candidate	Votes	%	±%
Liberal Democrats	Julia Salter	756	50.1	
Conservative	Stephen Ward	622	41.2	
Labour	David Waite	132	8.7	
Majority		134	8.9	
Turnout		1,510		
Liberal Democrats hold		Swing		

Rowner
Party	Candidate	Votes	%	±%
Conservative	Stephen Philpott	1,018	57.3	
Labour	Alan Durrant	760	42.7	
Majority		258	14.6	
Turnout		1,778		
Conservative hold		Swing		

Town
Party	Candidate	Votes	%	±%
Labour	June Cully	973	49.9	
Conservative	Richard Dickson	851	43.6	
Liberal Democrats	Amanda Seal	127	6.5	
Majority		122	6.3	
Turnout		1,951		
Labour hold		Swing		

Preceded by 1999 Gosport Council election	Gosport local elections	Succeeded by 2002 Gosport Council election
