= 2022 Gosport Borough Council election =

2022 UK local government election

← 2021	5 May 2022	2024 →

All 28 seats to Gosport Borough Council 15 seats needed for a majority

	First party	Second party	Third party
Party	Liberal Democrats	Conservative	Labour
Last election	14 seats, 23.8%	19 seats, 50.6%	1 seat, 21.9%
Seats won	16	10	2
Seat change	▲2	▼9	▲1
Popular vote	15,993	16,716	4,586
Percentage	40.9%	42.8%	11.7%
Swing	▲17.1%	▼8.1%	▼10.2%
- Winner of each seat at the 2022 Gosport Borough Council election
Council control before election
Conservative
Council control after election
Liberal Democrats

Elections to Gosport Borough Council took place on the 5th May 2022 as part of the 2022 United Kingdom local elections.

The Liberal Democrats gained control of the council from the Conservative Party.

== Background ==
The whole council was up for election following a boundary review. This reduced the size the council from 34 to 28.

The seats up had previously been elected in 2018 and 2021. The elections in 2018, saw the Liberal Democrats gain four seats: two from Conservatives, and one each from the Labour and UKIP. The Conservatives however gained the sole UKIP seat, retaining their majority on the council. The other half of seats were elected in 2021, when the Conservatives gained one seat from Labour. This left the council with a Conservative majority of four.

== Summary ==
=== Election result ===
2022 Gosport Borough Council election
Party	Seats	Gains	Losses	Net gain/loss	Seats %	Votes %	Votes	+/−
Liberal Democrats	16	N/A	N/A	▲2	57.1	40.9	15,993	+17.1
Conservative	10	N/A	N/A	▼9	35.7	42.8	16,716	–8.1
Labour	2	N/A	N/A	▲1	7.1	11.7	4,586	–10.2
Green	0	N/A	N/A	Steady	0.0	4.1	1,621	+1.4
Reform UK	0	N/A	N/A	Steady	0.0	0.2	93	N/A
Independent	0	N/A	N/A	Steady	0.0	0.2	75	–0.2

== Ward results ==
=== Alverstoke ===
Alverstoke
Party	Candidate	Votes	%	±%
Conservative	Kevin Casey	950	41.8	N/A
Conservative	Zoe Huggins	937	41.2	N/A
Liberal Democrats	Adele Earle	885	39.0	N/A
Liberal Democrats	William Charlton	821	36.1	N/A
Green	Sam Pollard	446	19.6	N/A
Labour	Jonathan Eaton	201	8.8	N/A
Turnout		2,272		
Conservative win (new seat)				
Conservative win (new seat)				

=== Anglesey ===
Anglesey
Party	Candidate	Votes	%	±%
Conservative	Philip Raffaelli	904	57.2	N/A
Conservative	Alan Scard	886	56.0	N/A
Liberal Democrats	Alison Charlton	453	28.7	N/A
Liberal Democrats	Robert Salter	306	19.4	N/A
Labour	Aretha Green	268	17.0	N/A
Turnout		1,581		
Conservative win (new seat)				
Conservative win (new seat)				

=== Bridgemary ===
Bridgemary
Party	Candidate	Votes	%	±%
Liberal Democrats	Stephen Hammond	874	62.0	N/A
Liberal Democrats	Bob Maynard	719	51.0	N/A
Conservative	Kathy Jones	480	34.0	N/A
Conservative	Supriya Namdeo	403	28.6	N/A
Labour	Martyn Davis	151	10.7	N/A
Turnout		1,410		
Liberal Democrats win (new seat)				
Liberal Democrats win (new seat)				

=== Brockhurst and Privett ===
Brockhurst and Privett
Party	Candidate	Votes	%	±%
Liberal Democrats	Robert Hylands	798	59.2	N/A
Liberal Democrats	Stephen Marshall	698	51.8	N/A
Conservative	Sean Blackman	429	31.8	N/A
Conservative	Linda Batty	383	28.4	N/A
Labour	Alison Mandrill	156	11.6	N/A
Turnout		1,347		
Liberal Democrats win (new seat)				
Liberal Democrats win (new seat)				

=== Elson ===
Elson
Party	Candidate	Votes	%	±%
Liberal Democrats	Sue Ballard	1,020	66.2	N/A
Liberal Democrats	Richard Earle	869	56.4	N/A
Conservative	Natasha Hook	350	22.7	N/A
Conservative	Alan Neville	347	22.5	N/A
Labour	Emma Smith	156	10.1	N/A
Green	Kathryn Kelly	119	7.7	N/A
Turnout		1,540		
Liberal Democrats win (new seat)				
Liberal Democrats win (new seat)				

=== Forton ===
Forton
Party	Candidate	Votes	%	±%
Liberal Democrats	Mervin Bradley	706	61.4	N/A
Liberal Democrats	Peter Chegwyn	666	57.9	N/A
Conservative	Sue Desbois	294	25.6	N/A
Conservative	Gary Walker	259	22.5	N/A
Labour	Claire Percival	208	18.1	N/A
Turnout		1,150		
Liberal Democrats win (new seat)				
Liberal Democrats win (new seat)				

=== Grange and Alver Valley ===
Grange and Alver Valley
Party	Candidate	Votes	%	±%
Conservative	Maggie Morgan	378	40.3	N/A
Conservative	Tony Jessop	367	39.2	N/A
Labour	Jonathan Brown	351	37.5	N/A
Liberal Democrats	Clive Foster-Reed	295	31.5	N/A
Labour	Hilary Percival	285	30.4	N/A
Turnout		937		
Conservative win (new seat)				
Conservative win (new seat)				

=== Harbourside and Town ===
Harbourside and Town
Party	Candidate	Votes	%	±%
Labour	June Cully	751	57.8	N/A
Labour	Alan Durrant	626	48.2	N/A
Conservative	Lesley Meenaghan	474	36.5	N/A
Conservative	Rob Thompson	374	28.8	N/A
Liberal Democrats	Susan Ely	166	12.8	N/A
Independent	Dale Fletcher	75	5.8	N/A
Turnout		1,300		
Labour win (new seat)				
Labour win (new seat)				

=== Hardway ===
Hardway
Party	Candidate	Votes	%	±%
Liberal Democrats	Jamie Hutchison	882	55.6	N/A
Liberal Democrats	Kirsty Cox	850	53.6	N/A
Conservative	Diane Furlong	544	34.3	N/A
Conservative	Kay Hallsworth	473	29.8	N/A
Labour	Simon Davis	146	9.2	N/A
Turnout		1,587		
Liberal Democrats win (new seat)				
Liberal Democrats win (new seat)				

=== Leesland and Newtown ===
Leesland and Newtown
Party	Candidate	Votes	%	±%
Liberal Democrats	Dawn Kelly	1,024	55.5	N/A
Liberal Democrats	Julie Westerby	1,015	55.0	N/A
Conservative	Chris Best	476	25.8	N/A
Conservative	David Gary	426	23.1	N/A
Labour	Charis Noakes	230	12.5	N/A
Green	Miles Fletcher	193	10.5	N/A
Reform UK	Aaron Pinder	93	5.0	N/A
Turnout		1,844		
Liberal Democrats win (new seat)				
Liberal Democrats win (new seat)				

=== Lee East ===
Lee East
Party	Candidate	Votes	%	±%
Conservative	Graham Burgess	968	53.6	N/A
Liberal Democrats	Kirsten Bradley	927	51.3	N/A
Conservative	Ian Orr	683	37.8	N/A
Green	Martin Suter	331	18.3	N/A
Labour	Jess Cully	201	11.1	N/A
Turnout		1,807		
Conservative win (new seat)				
Liberal Democrats win (new seat)				

=== Lee West ===
Lee West
Party	Candidate	Votes	%	±%
Conservative	John Beavis	1,340	69.3	N/A
Conservative	John Gledhill	1,219	63.0	N/A
Green	Zoe Aspinall	532	27.5	N/A
Labour	Anne Cruddas	440	22.8	N/A
Turnout		1,934		
Conservative win (new seat)				
Conservative win (new seat)				

=== Peel Common ===
Peel Common
Party	Candidate	Votes	%	±%
Conservative	Stephen Philpott	848	53.1	N/A
Liberal Democrats	Martin Pepper	837	52.4	N/A
Conservative	Lynn Hook	610	38.2	N/A
Labour	Daniel Stratton	277	17.4	N/A
Turnout		1,596		
Conservative win (new seat)				
Liberal Democrats win (new seat)				

=== Rowner and Holbrook ===
Rowner and Holbrook
Party	Candidate	Votes	%	±%
Liberal Democrats	David Herridge	600	49.3	N/A
Liberal Democrats	Murray Johnston	582	47.9	N/A
Conservative	Paddy Bergin	457	37.6	N/A
Conservative	Marcus Murphy	457	37.6	N/A
Labour	Paul Noakes	139	11.4	N/A
Turnout		1,216		
Liberal Democrats win (new seat)				
Liberal Democrats win (new seat)				
