= 2004 Gosport Borough Council election =

2004 UK local government election

2004 Gosport Borough Council Election
← 2002	10 June 2004	2006 →

17 of 35 seats to Gosport Borough Council 18 seats needed for a majority
	First party	Second party	Third party
Party	Conservative	Labour	Liberal Democrats
Seats won	10	5	2
Seat change	▲4	▼1	▼3
Popular vote	11,748	5,681	2,854
Percentage	56.2%	27.2%	13.6%
Council control before election
No Overall Control
Council control after election
No Overall Control

Elections to Gosport Council were held on 10 June 2004. Half of the council was up for election, and the council stayed under no overall control.

After the election, the composition of the council was

- Conservative: 15
- Labour: 11
- Liberal Democrat: 5
- Others: 3

== Election result ==
Gosport local election result 2004
Party	Seats	Gains	Losses	Net gain/loss	Seats %	Votes %	Votes	+/−
Conservative	10	4	0	+4	58.8	56.2	11,748	+16.2
Labour	5	0	1	-1	29.4	27.2	5,681	-5.7
Liberal Democrats	2	0	3	-3	11.8	13.6	2,854	-13.4
UKIP	0	0	0	0	0.0	2.0	426	+1.8
Green	0	0	0	0	0.0	1.0	213	+1.0

== Ward results ==
=== Alverstoke ===
Alverstoke
Party	Candidate	Votes	%	±%
Conservative	Philip Clinton	1,323	81.3	
Labour	Robert Salter	304	18.7	
Majority		1,019	62.6	
Turnout		1,627		
Conservative hold		Swing		

=== Anglesey ===
Anglesey
Party	Candidate	Votes	%	±%
Conservative	Mark Hook	1,034	75.9	
Labour	Jennifer Hall	328	24.1	
Majority		706	51.8	
Turnout		1,362		
Conservative hold		Swing		

=== Bridgemary North ===
Bridgemary North
Party	Candidate	Votes	%	±%
Labour	Martyn Davis	643	57.6	
Conservative	Joanne Watts	473	42.4	
Majority		170	15.2	
Turnout		1,116		
Labour hold		Swing		

=== Bridgemary South ===
Bridgemary South
Party	Candidate	Votes	%	±%
Labour	Jill Wright	727	61.4	
Conservative	Robert Perris	457	38.6	
Majority		270	22.8	
Turnout		1,184		
Labour hold		Swing		

=== Brockhurst ===
Brockhurst
Party	Candidate	Votes	%	±%
Conservative	Ivor Foster	681	53.5	
Liberal Democrats	Michael Russell	385	30.3	
Labour	James Fox	206	16.2	
Majority		296	23.2	
Turnout		1,272		
Conservative gain from Liberal Democrats		Swing		

=== Christchurch ===
Christchurch
Party	Candidate	Votes	%	±%
Conservative	Richard Dickson	564	44.3	
Liberal Democrats	Austin Hicks	362	28.4	
Labour	Diane Searle	348	27.3	
Majority		202	15.9	
Turnout		1,274		
Conservative gain from Liberal Democrats		Swing		

=== Elson ===
Elson
Party	Candidate	Votes	%	±%
Conservative	Bruce Rigg	624	47.0	
Liberal Democrats	Laura Elshaw	415	31.3	
UKIP	Francis Bridgewater	167	12.6	
Labour	Jill Whitcher	101	7.6	
Majority		209	15.7	
Turnout		1,327		
Conservative gain from Liberal Democrats		Swing		

=== Forton ===
Forton
Party	Candidate	Votes	%	±%
Labour	Keith Farr	410	40.5	
Liberal Democrats	Gary Elshaw	303	29.9	
Conservative	Anna Oliver	300	29.6	
Majority		107	10.6	
Turnout		1,013		
Labour hold		Swing		

=== Grange ===
Grange
Party	Candidate	Votes	%	±%
Liberal Democrats	Nina Champion	239	36.8	
Labour	Victor Burt	222	34.2	
Conservative	Hugh Landels	188	29.0	
Majority		17	2.6	
Turnout		649		
Liberal Democrats hold		Swing		

=== Hardway ===
Hardway
Party	Candidate	Votes	%	±%
Conservative	Peter Langdon	822	66.1	
Green	Andrea Smith	213	17.1	
Labour	Peter Bell	209	16.8	
Majority		609	49.0	
Turnout		1,244		
Conservative hold		Swing		

=== Lee East ===
Lee East
Party	Candidate	Votes	%	±%
Conservative	Howard Burgess	966	83.0	
Labour	John Madgwick	198	17.0	
Majority		768	66.0	
Turnout		1,164		
Conservative hold		Swing		

=== Lee West ===
Lee West
Party	Candidate	Votes	%	±%
Conservative	Brian Taylor	1,326	81.9	
Labour	Michael Madgwick	294	18.1	
Majority		1,032	63.8	
Turnout		1,620		
Conservative hold		Swing		

=== Leesland ===
Leesland
Party	Candidate	Votes	%	±%
Liberal Democrats	David Smith	529	48.9	
Conservative	Marjorie Bailey	380	35.1	
Labour	Alan Durrant	173	16.0	
Majority		149	13.8	
Turnout		1,082		
Liberal Democrats hold		Swing		

=== Peel Common ===
Peel Common
Party	Candidate	Votes	%	±%
Conservative	Stephen Philpott	896	57.6	
Labour	Peter Russell	401	25.8	
UKIP	John Bowles	259	16.6	
Majority		495	31.8	
Turnout		1,556		
Conservative gain from Labour		Swing		

=== Privett ===
Privett
Party	Candidate	Votes	%	±%
Conservative	Colin Jacobs	865	63.0	
Liberal Democrats	Josephine Jackson	348	25.3	
Labour	Dennis Gough	161	11.7	
Majority		517	37.7	
Turnout		1,374		
Conservative hold		Swing		

=== Rowner & Holbrook ===
Rowner & Holbrook
Party	Candidate	Votes	%	±%
Labour	John Train	326	35.6	
Conservative	Thelma Morrison	317	34.6	
Liberal Democrats	Wayne Richards	273	29.8	
Majority		9	1.0	
Turnout		916		
Labour hold		Swing		

=== Town ===
Town
Party	Candidate	Votes	%	±%
Labour	Neil Redrup	630	54.2	
Conservative	Michael Geddes	532	45.8	
Majority		98	8.4	
Turnout		1,162		
Labour hold		Swing		

Preceded by 2002 Gosport Council election	Gosport local elections	Succeeded by 2006 Gosport Council election
