= 1998 Gosport Borough Council election =

1998 UK local government election

Elections to Gosport Borough Council were held on 7 May 1998. One third of the council was up for election and the council stayed under no overall control.

After the election, the composition of the council was

- Labour 10
- Conservative 9
- Liberal Democrat 3
- Others 8

== Election result ==
Gosport local election result 1998
Party	Seats	Gains	Losses	Net gain/loss	Seats %	Votes %	Votes	+/−
Labour	6			+2	54.5			
Conservative	4			+4	36.4			
Liberal Democrats	1			-3	9.1			
Others	0			-3	0			

Preceded by 1996 Gosport Council election	Gosport local elections	Succeeded by 1999 Gosport Council election
