= 2006 Gosport Borough Council election =

2006 UK local government election

2006 Gosport Borough Council Election
← 2004	4 May 2006	2008 →

17 of 35 seats to Gosport Borough Council 18 seats needed for a majority
	First party	Second party	Third party
Party	Liberal Democrats	Conservative	Labour
Seats before	5	15	11
Seats won	8	6	3
Seats after	9	17	8
Seat change	▲4	▼1	▼3
Popular vote	5,701	9,644	4,993
Percentage	26.6%	45.1%	17.6%
Council control before election
No Overall Control
Council control after election
No Overall Control

Elections to Gosport Borough Council were held on 4 May 2006. Half of the council was up for election and the Conservative Party lost overall control of the council to no overall control.

After the election, the composition of the council was:

- Conservative 17
- Liberal Democrat 9
- Labour 8

== Election result ==
Gosport local election result 2006
Party	Seats	Gains	Losses	Net gain/loss	Seats %	Votes %	Votes	+/−
Liberal Democrats	8	4	0	+4	47.1	26.6	5,701	+13.0
Conservative	6	1	2	-1	35.3	45.1	9,644	-11.1
Labour	3	0	3	-3	17.6	23.3	4,993	-3.9
Green	0	0	0	0	0.0	4.9	1,054	+3.9

== Ward results ==
=== Alverstoke ===
Alverstoke
Party	Candidate	Votes	%	±%
Conservative	Peter Edgar	1,193	76.2	−5.1
Liberal Democrats	Frances Elsom	242	15.5	+15.5
Labour	Sharon Dewar	131	8.4	−10.3
Majority		951	60.7	−1.9
Turnout		1,566		
Conservative hold		Swing		

=== Anglesey ===
Anglesey
Party	Candidate	Votes	%	±%
Liberal Democrats	Austin Hicks	810	54.0	+54.0
Conservative	Aleck Hayward	622	41.4	−34.5
Labour	Paul Noakes	69	4.6	−19.5
Majority		188	12.6	
Turnout		1,501		
Liberal Democrats gain from Conservative		Swing		

=== Bridgemary North ===
Bridgemary North
Party	Candidate	Votes	%	±%
Labour	Shaun Cully	809	67.8	+10.2
Conservative	Margaret Ward	384	32.2	−10.2
Majority		425	35.6	+20.4
Turnout		1,193		
Labour hold		Swing		

=== Bridgemary South ===
Bridgemary South
Party	Candidate	Votes	%	±%
Labour	Dennis Wright	703	61.9	+0.5
Conservative	Pauline Taylor	433	38.1	−0.5
Majority		270	23.8	+1.0
Turnout		1,136		
Labour hold		Swing		

=== Brockhurst ===
Brockhurst
Party	Candidate	Votes	%	±%
Liberal Democrats	Julia Salter	677	55.0	+24.7
Conservative	Laura Elshaw	341	27.7	−25.8
Labour	Joseph O'Gorman	156	12.7	−3.5
Green	Staffieri	58	4.7	+4.7
Majority		336	27.3	
Turnout		1,232		
Liberal Democrats hold		Swing		

=== Christchurch ===
Christchurch
Party	Candidate	Votes	%	±%
Liberal Democrats	Michael Carr	585	49.0	+20.6
Conservative	Michael Geddes	346	29.0	−15.3
Labour	Alan Durrant	154	12.9	−14.4
Green	Veronika Forster	108	9.1	+9.1
Majority		239	20.0	
Turnout		1,193		
Liberal Democrats hold		Swing		

=== Elson ===
Elson
Party	Candidate	Votes	%	±%
Liberal Democrats	Susan Ballard	648	48.6	+17.3
Conservative	Keith Edwards	517	38.8	−8.2
Green	Noelle Bradshaw	88	6.6	+6.6
Labour	Louie Sykes	81	6.1	−1.5
Majority		131	9.8	
Turnout		1,334		
Liberal Democrats gain from Conservative		Swing		

=== Forton ===
Forton
Party	Candidate	Votes	%	±%
Liberal Democrats	Clive Foster-Reed	556	48.4	+18.5
Labour	Kenneth Searle	356	31.0	−9.5
Conservative	Gary Elshaw	158	13.8	−15.8
Green	Mark Vernon	78	6.8	+6.8
Majority		200	17.4	
Turnout		1,148		
Liberal Democrats gain from Labour		Swing		

=== Grange ===
Grange
Party	Candidate	Votes	%	±%
Conservative	Paul Champion	310	46.4	+17.4
Labour	Victor Burt	152	22.8	−11.4
Liberal Democrats	Mark Mudie	142	21.3	−15.5
Green	Ian Maclennan	64	9.6	+9.6
Majority		168	23.6	
Turnout		668		
Conservative hold		Swing		

=== Hardway ===
Hardway
Party	Candidate	Votes	%	±%
Conservative	Roger Allen	625	45.8	−20.3
Green	Andrea Smith	610	44.7	+27.6
Labour	Michael Wilson	129	9.5	−7.3
Majority		15	1.1	−47.9
Turnout		1,364		
Conservative hold		Swing		

=== Lee East ===
Lee East
Party	Candidate	Votes	%	±%
Conservative	Derek Kimber	1,106	84.4	+1.4
Labour	Jess Cully	205	15.6	−1.4
Majority		901	68.8	+2.8
Turnout		1,311		
Conservative hold		Swing		

=== Lee West ===
Lee West
Party	Candidate	Votes	%	±%
Conservative	Christopher Carter	1,410	85.9	+4.0
Labour	Peter Bell	231	14.1	−4.0
Majority		1,179	71.8	+8.0
Turnout		1,641		
Conservative hold		Swing		

=== Leesland ===
Leesland
Party	Candidate	Votes	%	±%
Liberal Democrats	Peter Chegwyn	752	67.0	+18.1
Conservative	Adam Burns	270	24.1	−11.0
Labour	Michael O'Gorman	100	8.9	−7.1
Majority		482	42.9	+29.1
Turnout		1,122		
Liberal Democrats hold		Swing		

=== Peel Common ===
Peel Common
Party	Candidate	Votes	%	±%
Conservative	Stephen Ward	806	57.4	−0.2
Labour	Iris Binfield	597	42.6	+16.8
Majority		209	14.8	−17.0
Turnout		1,403		
Conservative gain from Labour		Swing		

=== Privett ===
Privett
Party	Candidate	Votes	%	±%
Liberal Democrats	Keith Gill	743	54.1	+28.8
Conservative	Lynn Hook	516	37.6	−25.4
Labour	Jennifer Hall	115	8.4	−3.3
Majority		227	16.5	
Turnout		1,374		
Liberal Democrats hold		Swing		

=== Rowner and Holbrook ===
Rowner and Holbrook
Party	Candidate	Votes	%	±%
Liberal Democrats	Sharon Mudie	403	41.3	+11.5
Conservative	Joanne Watts	276	28.3	−6.3
Labour	Peter Russell	248	25.4	−10.2
Green	Rhiannon Thomas	48	4.9	+4.9
Majority		127	13.0	
Turnout		975		
Liberal Democrats gain from Labour		Swing		

=== Town ===
Town
Party	Candidate	Votes	%	±%
Labour	June Cully	757	61.5	+7.3
Conservative	Kathleen Stewart	331	26.9	−18.9
Liberal Democrats	Dawn Kelly	143	11.6	+11.6
Majority		426	34.6	+26.2
Turnout		1,231		
Labour hold		Swing		

Preceded by 2004 Gosport Council election	Gosport local elections	Succeeded by 2008 Gosport Council election
