= HMS Redpole (U69) =

Modified Black Swan-class sloop

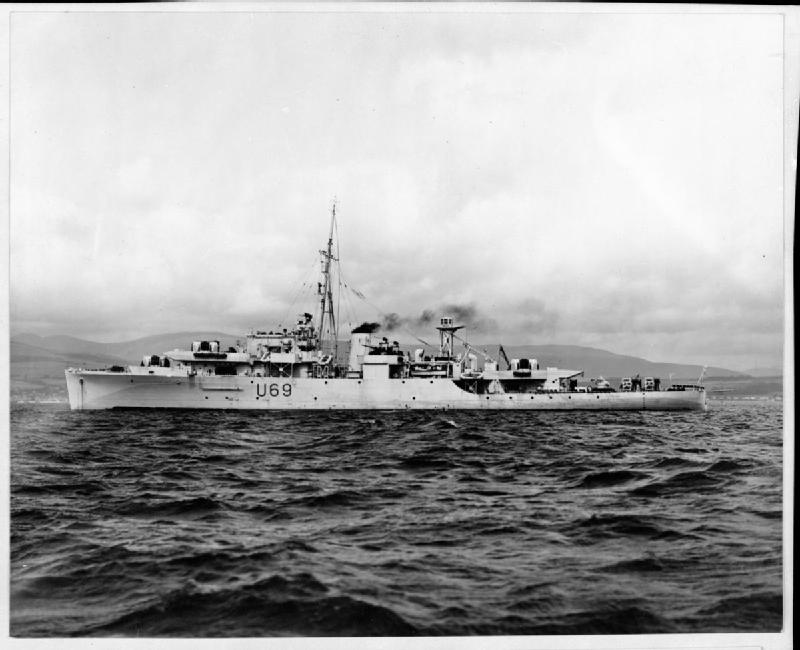
- HMS Redpole anchored in 1943.

History

United Kingdom
- Name: Redpole
- Namesake: Redpole
- Ordered: 27 March 1941
- Builder: Cammell Laird, Birkenhead
- Laid down: 18 May 1942
- Launched: 25 February 1943
- Commissioned: 24 June 1943
- Decommissioned: 1958
- Identification: Pennant number: U69
- Fate: Scrapped in 1960

General characteristics
- Class & type: Modified Black Swan-class sloop
- Displacement: 1,350 tons
- Length: 283 ft (86 m)
- Beam: 38.5 ft (11.7 m)
- Propulsion: Geared turbines; two shafts
- Speed: 20 knots (37 km/h) at 4,300 hp (3,200 kW)
- Complement: 192 men + 1 Cat
- Armament: 6 × QF 4 in Mk XVI anti-aircraft guns; 12 × 20 mm anti-aircraft guns

HMS Redpole was a modified Black Swan-class sloop of the Royal Navy. She was laid down by Yarrow Shipbuilders Limited, Scotstoun on 18 May 1942, launched on 25 February 1943 and commissioned on 24 June 1943, with the pennant number U69.

== Construction and career ==
After tests and its operational commissioning in July 1943, HMS Redpole joined the 7th Escort Group in Greenock for the escort and support of convoys in the Atlantic, then in Gibraltar, for convoys in the Mediterranean.

In May 1944, she was in the service of Support Force G during the assault phase of the Allied landing planned in Normandy as part of Operation Neptune.

At the end of 1944, Redpole was assigned to the East Indies Fleet for training when some ships were transferred to the British Pacific Fleet.

In January 1945, she joined Task Force 64 to support the landings in Burma. She provided fire support with the Bombardment Force during the landings of the British 4th and 71st Brigades in the northern part of Ramree Island during Operation Matador.

From February to July 1945, she was in Auckland, New Zealand for repairs and technical improvements. At the end of the post-refit tests, she left for Sydney, Australia for service with the British Pacific Fleet, then found herself at Manus Forward Operating Base in the Admiralty Islands in August 1945.

HMS Redpole returned to Royal Navy control upon arrival and deployed with the British Pacific Fleet to Hong Kong to support repatriation operations. She remained in the Pacific until her return to the United Kingdom in 1946 to be placed on the reserve at Harwich.

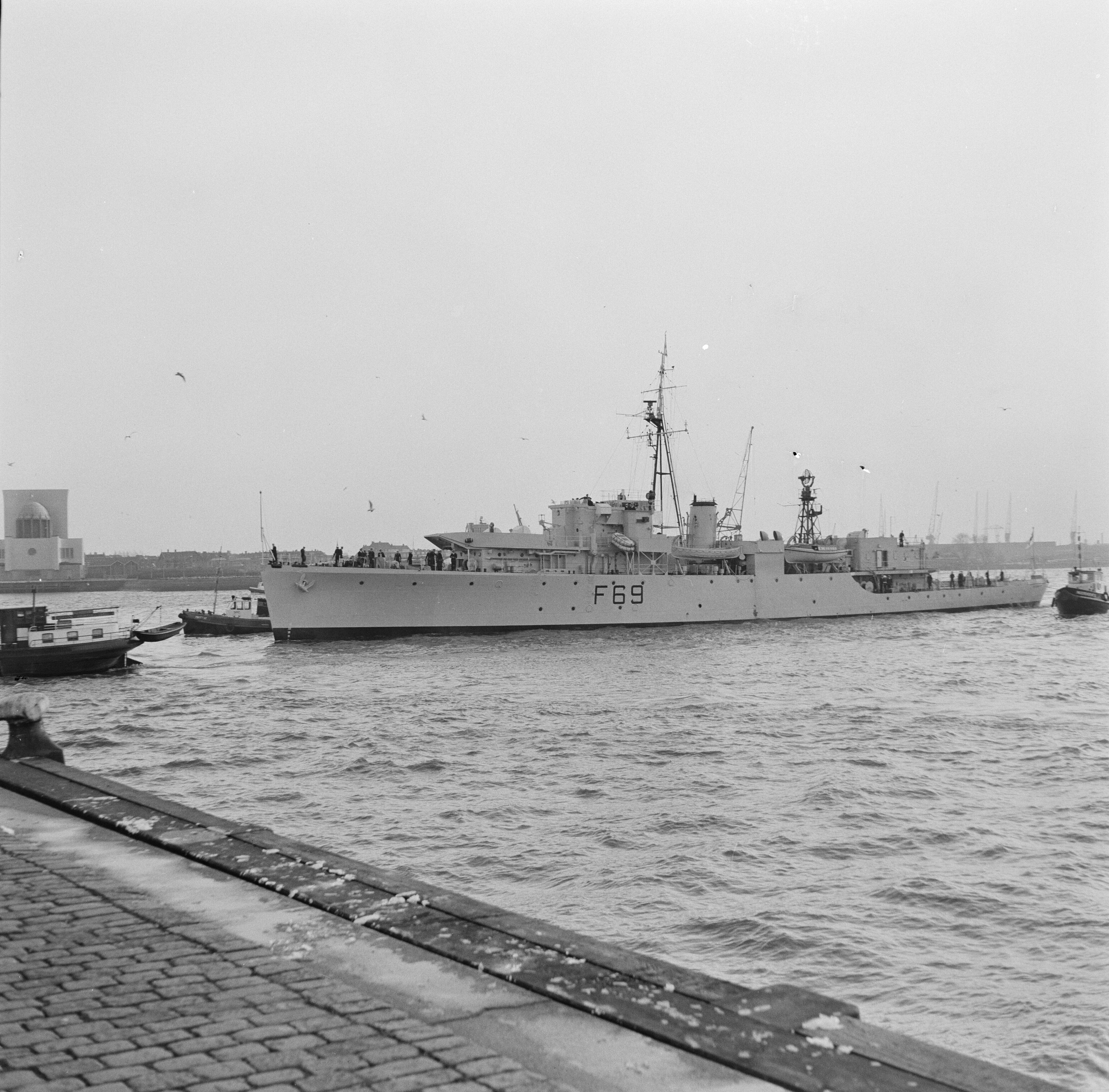
Redpole in 1958

Three years later, the vessel was reactivated to serve as a navigation training vessel attached to HMS Dryad in Portsmouth and returned to service. Her armament was removed during a major refit, including the installation of a tripod mast and the provision of facilities for the practical training of junior officers in navigation.

On 7 July 1956, HMS Redpole collided with the Danish royal yacht Dannebrog breaking her bowsprit.

On 12 July 1957, she was involved in a collision with the Gosport Ferry Vadne ferry seriously damaging the ferry.

In 1958 the ship was withdrawn from its training role and returned to the reserve until 1960.

It was sold to BISCO on 11 November 1960 for demolition by JA White and arrived in tow at the demolition site in St. Davids on 20 November that year.
