= 2008 Gosport Borough Council election =

2008 UK local government election

2008 Gosport Borough Council Election
| ← 2006 | 1 May 2008 | 2010 → |

17 of 35 seats to Gosport Borough Council 18 seats needed for a majority
| | First party | Second party | Third party |
|---|---|---|---|
| Party | Conservative | Liberal Democrats | Labour |
| Seats before | 17 | 9 | 8 |
| Seats won | 10 | 6 | 1 |
| Seats after | 16 | 14 | 4 |
| Seat change | ▼1 | ▲5 | ▼4 |
| Popular vote | 11,686 | 5,672 | 3,353 |
| Percentage | 53.1% | 25.8% | 15.2% |
Council control before election
No Overall Control
Council control after election
No Overall Control

Elections to Gosport Borough Council in Hampshire, England were held on 1 May 2008. Half of the council was up for election and the council stayed under no overall control.

Before the election the Labour and Liberal Democrat parties had held power on the council with the casting vote of the mayor. The election saw the Liberal Democrats close the gap with the Conservative Party after making 5 gains, while the Labour Party lost four of the five seats they had held. However following the election the Conservative Party said that they would take charge of the council as they remained the largest party.

After the election, the composition of the council was:

- Conservative 16
- Liberal Democrat 14
- Labour 4

== Election result ==
Gosport local election result 2008
| Party | Seats | Gains | Losses | Net gain/loss | Seats % | Votes % | Votes | +/− |
|---|---|---|---|---|---|---|---|---|
| Conservative | 10 | 3 | 4 | -1 | 58.8 | 53.1 | 11,686 | +8.0 |
| Liberal Democrats | 6 | 5 | 0 | +5 | 35.3 | 25.8 | 5,672 | -0.8 |
| Labour | 1 | 0 | 4 | -4 | 5.9 | 15.2 | 3,353 | -8.1 |
| Green | 0 | 0 | 0 | 0 | 0.0 | 3.0 | 669 | -1.9 |
| UKIP | 0 | 0 | 0 | 0 | 0.0 | 2.3 | 503 | +2.3 |
| English Democrat | 0 | 0 | 0 | 0 | 0.0 | 0.6 | 131 | +0.6 |

== Ward results ==
=== Alverstoke ===
Alverstoke
| Party | Candidate | Votes | % | ±% |
|---|---|---|---|---|
| Conservative | Mark Hood | 1,175 | 70.5 | −5.7 |
| Liberal Democrats | Graham Payne | 200 | 12.0 | −3.5 |
| UKIP | Judith Smith | 165 | 9.9 | +9.9 |
| Labour | Jennifer Hall | 127 | 7.6 | −0.8 |
| Majority | | 975 | 58.5 | −2.2 |
| Turnout | | 1,667 | 47.9 | |
| Conservative hold | | Swing | | |

=== Anglesey ===
Anglesey
| Party | Candidate | Votes | % | ±% |
|---|---|---|---|---|
| Liberal Democrats | Robert Forder | 711 | 49.1 | −4.9 |
| Conservative | Brian Taylor | 664 | 45.9 | +4.5 |
| Labour | Graham Hewitt | 72 | 5.0 | +0.4 |
| Majority | | 47 | 3.2 | −9.4 |
| Turnout | | 1,447 | 48.4 | |
| Liberal Democrats gain from Conservative | | Swing | | |

=== Bridgemary North ===
Bridgemary North
| Party | Candidate | Votes | % | ±% |
|---|---|---|---|---|
| Conservative | Keith Edwards | 594 | 52.2 | +20.0 |
| Labour | Kenneth Searle | 544 | 47.8 | −20.0 |
| Majority | | 50 | 4.4 | |
| Turnout | | 1,138 | 32.5 | |
| Conservative gain from Labour | | Swing | | |

=== Bridgemary South ===
Bridgemary South
| Party | Candidate | Votes | % | ±% |
|---|---|---|---|---|
| Conservative | Michael Geddes | 625 | 54.2 | +16.1 |
| Labour | Jill Wright | 529 | 45.8 | −16.1 |
| Majority | | 96 | 8.4 | |
| Turnout | | 1,154 | 32.0 | |
| Conservative gain from Labour | | Swing | | |

=== Brockhurst ===
Brockhurst
| Party | Candidate | Votes | % | ±% |
|---|---|---|---|---|
| Liberal Democrats | Michael Salter | 571 | 47.5 | −7.5 |
| Conservative | Ivor Foster | 476 | 39.6 | +11.9 |
| Labour | Michael O'Gorman | 81 | 6.7 | −6.0 |
| Green | Jane Satffieri | 74 | 6.2 | +1.5 |
| Majority | | 95 | 7.9 | −19.4 |
| Turnout | | 1,202 | 32.1 | |
| Liberal Democrats gain from Conservative | | Swing | | |

=== Christchurch ===
Christchurch
| Party | Candidate | Votes | % | ±% |
|---|---|---|---|---|
| Conservative | Richard Dickson | 501 | 42.7 | +13.7 |
| Liberal Democrats | Heather Carr | 487 | 41.6 | −7.4 |
| UKIP | Catherine Andrews | 68 | 5.8 | +5.8 |
| Labour | Paul Noakes | 61 | 5.2 | −7.7 |
| Green | Veronika Forster | 55 | 4.7 | −4.4 |
| Majority | | 14 | 1.1 | |
| Turnout | | 1,172 | 34.7 | |
| Conservative hold | | Swing | | |

=== Elson ===
Elson
| Party | Candidate | Votes | % | ±% |
|---|---|---|---|---|
| Liberal Democrats | Andrea Bailey | 582 | 46.3 | −2.3 |
| Conservative | Lynn Hook | 510 | 40.6 | +1.8 |
| UKIP | Francis Bridgewater | 103 | 8.2 | +8.2 |
| Labour | Michael Madgwick | 61 | 4.9 | −1.2 |
| Majority | | 72 | 5.7 | −4.1 |
| Turnout | | 1,256 | 35.8 | |
| Liberal Democrats gain from Conservative | | Swing | | |

=== Forton ===
Forton
| Party | Candidate | Votes | % | ±% |
|---|---|---|---|---|
| Liberal Democrats | Mervin Bradley | 448 | 41.0 | −7.4 |
| Labour | Keith Farr | 396 | 36.2 | +5.2 |
| Conservative | Peter Greenwood | 250 | 22.9 | +9.1 |
| Majority | | 52 | 4.8 | −12.6 |
| Turnout | | 1,094 | 32.6 | |
| Liberal Democrats gain from Labour | | Swing | | |

=== Grange ===
Grange
| Party | Candidate | Votes | % | ±% |
|---|---|---|---|---|
| Conservative | Kim West | 359 | 54.5 | +9.1 |
| Liberal Democrats | George Morby | 216 | 32.8 | +11.5 |
| Labour | Alan Durrant | 59 | 9.0 | −13.8 |
| Green | Iain MacLennan | 25 | 3.8 | −5.8 |
| Majority | | 143 | 21.7 | −1.9 |
| Turnout | | 659 | 17.7 | |
| Conservative hold | | Swing | | |

=== Hardway ===
Hardway
| Party | Candidate | Votes | % | ±% |
|---|---|---|---|---|
| Conservative | Peter Langdon | 792 | 52.1 | +6.3 |
| Green | Andrea Smith | 472 | 31.1 | −13.6 |
| Labour | Jess Cully | 182 | 12.0 | +2.5 |
| UKIP | Darren Fells | 73 | 4.8 | +4.8 |
| Majority | | 320 | 21.0 | +19.9 |
| Turnout | | 1,519 | 36.2 | |
| Conservative hold | | Swing | | |

=== Lee East ===
Lee East
| Party | Candidate | Votes | % | ±% |
|---|---|---|---|---|
| Conservative | Howard Burgess | 1,132 | 71.7 | −12.7 |
| Liberal Democrats | Paul Keeley | 373 | 23.6 | +23.6 |
| Labour | Peter Bell | 74 | 4.7 | −10.9 |
| Majority | | 759 | 48.1 | −20.7 |
| Turnout | | 1,579 | 38.2 | |
| Conservative hold | | Swing | | |

=== Lee West ===
Lee West
| Party | Candidate | Votes | % | ±% |
|---|---|---|---|---|
| Conservative | John Beavis | 1,691 | 89.7 | +3.8 |
| Labour | Jill Whitcher | 194 | 10.3 | −3.8 |
| Majority | | 1,497 | 79.4 | +7.6 |
| Turnout | | 1,885 | 51.1 | |
| Conservative hold | | Swing | | |

=== Leesland ===
Leesland
| Party | Candidate | Votes | % | ±% |
|---|---|---|---|---|
| Liberal Democrats | David Smith | 604 | 48.2 | −18.8 |
| Conservative | George McAleese | 555 | 44.3 | +20.2 |
| Labour | Vivienne O'Gorman | 94 | 7.5 | −1.4 |
| Majority | | 49 | 3.9 | −39.0 |
| Turnout | | 1,253 | 35.9 | |
| Liberal Democrats hold | | Swing | | |

=== Peel Common ===
Peel Common
| Party | Candidate | Votes | % | ±% |
|---|---|---|---|---|
| Conservative | Stephen Philpott | 913 | 68.1 | +10.4 |
| Liberal Democrats | John Bowles | 291 | 21.7 | +21.7 |
| Labour | Joseph O'Gorman | 136 | 10.1 | −32.5 |
| Majority | | 622 | 46.4 | +31.6 |
| Turnout | | 1,340 | 40.4 | |
| Conservative hold | | Swing | | |

=== Privett ===
Privett
| Party | Candidate | Votes | % | ±% |
|---|---|---|---|---|
| Liberal Democrats | Ingeborg Forder | 734 | 49.6 | −4.5 |
| Conservative | Colin Jacobs | 677 | 45.8 | +8.2 |
| Labour | DenniJohn Madgwick | 68 | 4.6 | −3.8 |
| Majority | | 57 | 3.8 | 12.7 |
| Turnout | | 1,479 | 44.7 | |
| Liberal Democrats gain from Conservative | | Swing | | |

=== Rowner and Holbrook ===
Rowner and Holbrook
| Party | Candidate | Votes | % | ±% |
|---|---|---|---|---|
| Conservative | Marcus Murphy | 345 | 39.5 | +11.2 |
| Liberal Democrats | Michael Edwards | 215 | 24.6 | −16.7 |
| Labour | John Train | 183 | 20.9 | −4.5 |
| English Democrat | Robert Shaw | 131 | 15.0 | +15.0 |
| Majority | | 130 | 14.9 | |
| Turnout | | 874 | 26.9 | |
| Conservative gain from Labour | | Swing | | |

=== Town ===
Town
| Party | Candidate | Votes | % | ±% |
|---|---|---|---|---|
| Labour | Diane Searle | 492 | 38.0 | −23.5 |
| Conservative | Adam Burns | 427 | 32.9 | +6.0 |
| Liberal Democrats | Cyril Simpson | 240 | 18.5 | +6.9 |
| UKIP | Christine Harris | 94 | 7.3 | +7.3 |
| Green | Harry Haines | 43 | 3.3 | +3.3 |
| Majority | | 65 | 5.1 | −29.5 |
| Turnout | | 1,296 | 34.9 | |
| Labour hold | | Swing | | |

| Preceded by 2006 Gosport Council election | Gosport local elections | Succeeded by 2010 Gosport Council election |
