= 2002 Gosport Borough Council election =

2002 UK local government election

2002 Gosport Borough Council Election
- 2 May 2002

All 34 seats to Gosport Borough Council 18 seats needed for a majority
	First party	Second party	Third party
Party	Labour	Liberal Democrats	Conservative
Seats won	12	12	10
Popular vote	6,456	5,323	7,830
Percentage	32.8%	27.1%	39.8%
Council control before election
No Overall Control
Council control after election
No Overall Control

Elections to Gosport Council were held on 2 May 2002. The whole council was up for election with boundary changes since the last election in 2000 increasing the number of seats by 4. The council stayed under no overall control.

After the election, the composition of the council was:

- Labour 12
- Liberal Democrat 12
- Conservative 10

== Election results ==
The table below only tallies the votes of the highest polling candidate for each party within each ward. This is known as the top candidate method and is often used for multi-member plurality elections.

Gosport Local Election Result 2002
Party	Seats	Gains	Losses	Net gain/loss	Seats %	Votes %	Votes	+/−
Labour	12			0	35.3	32.8	6,456	
Liberal Democrats	12			+7	35.3	27.1	5,323	
Conservative	10			-3	29.4	39.8	7,830	
UKIP	0			0	0.0	0.3	63	

== Ward results ==
=== Alverstoke ===
Alverstoke (2)
Party	Candidate	Votes	%	±%
Conservative	Peter Edgar	1,010	67.42	
Conservative	Geoffrey Bartlett	982		
Liberal Democrats	Josephine Jackson	350	23.64	
Liberal Democrats	Graham Payne	311		
Labour	Christine Searle	138	9.21	
Labour	Jill Whitcher	114		
Majority		660	44.05	
Conservative win (new seat)				
Conservative win (new seat)				

=== Anglesey ===
Anglesey (2)
Party	Candidate	Votes	%	±%
Conservative	Aleck Hayward	692	48.73	
Conservative	Mark Hook	626		
Liberal Democrats	Tessa Bloodworth	620	23.66	
Liberal Democrats	Austin Hicks	562		
Labour	Jennifer Hall	108	7.60	
Labour	John Madgwick	85		
Majority		72	5.07	
Conservative win (new seat)				
Conservative win (new seat)				

=== Bridgemary North ===
Bridgemary North (2)
Party	Candidate	Votes	%	±%
Labour	Shaun Cully	814	76.28	
Labour	Marilyn Angus	795		
Conservative	Joanne Watts	253	23.71	
Conservative	Hugh Landels	235		
Majority		561	52.57	
Labour win (new seat)				
Labour win (new seat)				

=== Bridgemary South ===
Bridgemary South (2)
Party	Candidate	Votes	%	±%
Labour	Dennis Wright	767	71.21	
Labour	Jill Wright	754		
Conservative	Henry Butchart	310	28.78	
Conservative	Karen Millinder	298		
Majority		457	42.43	
Labour win (new seat)				
Labour win (new seat)				

=== Brockhurst ===
Brockhurst (2)
Party	Candidate	Votes	%	±%
Liberal Democrats	Julia Salter	490	43.78	
Liberal Democrats	Michael Russell	473		
Conservative	Josephine King	323	28.86	
Conservative	Ivor Foster	314		
Labour	Graham Batterbury	306	27.34	
Labour	Robert Salter	291		
Majority		167	14.92	
Liberal Democrats win (new seat)				
Liberal Democrats win (new seat)				

=== Christchurch ===
Christchurch (2)
Party	Candidate	Votes	%	±%
Liberal Democrats	Jackie Carr	499	40.17	
Liberal Democrats	Derek Francis	476		
Labour	Philip Smith	411	33.09	
Labour	Alan Durant	365		
Conservative	Richard Dickson	332	26.73	
Conservative	Phillip Clinton	314		
Majority		88	7.08	
Liberal Democrats win (new seat)				
Liberal Democrats win (new seat)				

=== Elson ===
Elson (2)
Party	Candidate	Votes	%	±%
Liberal Democrats	Keith Edwards	616	54.41	
Liberal Democrats	Laura Elshaw	594		
Conservative	Bruce Rigg	385	34.01	
Conservative	Karen Philpott	354		
Labour	Elizabeth Bull	131	11.57	
Labour	Simon Bull	127		
Majority		231	7.08	
Liberal Democrats win (new seat)				
Liberal Democrats win (new seat)				

=== Forton ===
Forton (2)
Party	Candidate	Votes	%	±%
Labour	Kenneth Searle	488	46.47	
Labour	Keith Farr	480		
Liberal Democrats	Amanda Seal	384	36.57	
Liberal Democrats	Dale Low	316		
Conservative	Gaynor Holmes	178	16.95	
Conservative	David Craker	173		
Majority		104	9.90	
Labour win (new seat)				
Labour win (new seat)				

=== Grange ===
Grange (2)
Party	Candidate	Votes	%	±%
Liberal Democrats	Alexander Bone	373	55.34	
Liberal Democrats	Monique Gravell	344		
Labour	Nathaniel Gould	209	31.00	
Labour	Martyn Davis	201		
Conservative	Carl Downing	92	13.64	
Conservative	Stephen Ward	87		
Majority		373	55.34	
Liberal Democrats win (new seat)				
Liberal Democrats win (new seat)				

=== Hardway ===
Hardway (2)
Party	Candidate	Votes	%	±%
Conservative	Roger Allen	529	51.11	
Conservative	Peter Langdon	500		
Labour	Brian Leishman	295	28.50	
Labour	Diane Searle	294		
Liberal Democrats	Patricia Anderson	148	14.29	
Liberal Democrats	Michael Salter	123		
UKIP	John Bowles	63	6.08	
Majority		234	22.60	
Conservative win (new seat)				
Conservative win (new seat)				

=== Lee East ===
Lee East (2)
Party	Candidate	Votes	%	±%
Conservative	Derek Kimber	602	70.00	
Conservative	Howard Burgess	584		
Liberal Democrats	David Fisher	155	18.02	
Liberal Democrats	David Robson	145		
Labour	Sharon Boyd	103	11.97	
Labour	Peter Bell	101		
Majority		447	51.97	
Conservative win (new seat)				
Conservative win (new seat)				

=== Lee West ===
Lee West (2)
Party	Candidate	Votes	%	±%
Conservative	Christopher Carter	1,233	77.69	
Conservative	Brian Taylor	1,064		
Labour	William Methven	354	22.93	
Labour	Michael Madgwick	272		
Majority		55.38	879	
Conservative win (new seat)				
Conservative win (new seat)				

=== Leesland ===
Leesland (2)
Party	Candidate	Votes	%	±%
Liberal Democrats	Peter Chegwyn	548	51.31	
Liberal Democrats	David Smith	507		
Conservative	Maureen Clarke	264	24.71	
Labour	Thomas Cheetham	256	23.97	
Conservative	Robert Perris	247		
Labour	Paul Wilson-Suffield	211		
Majority		26.59	26.59	
Liberal Democrats win (new seat)				
Liberal Democrats win (new seat)				

=== Peel Common ===
Peel Common (2)
Party	Candidate	Votes	%	±%
Labour	Iris Binfield	738	57.79	
Labour	Peter Russell	665		
Conservative	Stephen Philpott	539	42.20	
Conservative	Michael Geddes	506		
Majority		199	15.58	
Labour win (new seat)				
Labour win (new seat)				

=== Privett ===
Privett (2)
Party	Candidate	Votes	%	±%
Liberal Democrats	Keith Gill	627	46.68	
Liberal Democrats	Michael Friend	603		
Conservative	Peter Gibson	546	40.65	
Conservative	Denis King	524		
Labour	James Fox	170	12.65	
Labour	Dennis Gough	169		
Majority		81	6.03	
Liberal Democrats win (new seat)				
Liberal Democrats win (new seat)				

=== Rowner and Holbrook ===
Rowner and Holbrook (2)
Party	Candidate	Votes	%	±%
Labour	Jean Batterbury	401	42.03	
Labour	John Train	387		
Liberal Democrats	Michael Fletcher	372	38.99	
Liberal Democrats	Stephen Cooke	344		
Conservative	Nigel Gravells	181	18.97	
Conservative	Colin Jacobs	163		
Majority		29	3.03	
Labour win (new seat)				
Labour win (new seat)				

=== Town ===
Town (2)
Party	Candidate	Votes	%	±%
Labour	June Cully	767	60.44	
Labour	Neil Redrup	687		
Conservative	John Didymus	361	30.02	
Conservative	Michael Philpott	346		
Liberal Democrats	Christina Allaway	141	11.11	
Liberal Democrats	Simon Seal	114		
Majority		406	31.99	
Labour win (new seat)				
Labour win (new seat)				

Preceded by 2000 Gosport Council election	Gosport local elections	Succeeded by 2004 Gosport Council election
