= 2024 Gosport Borough Council election =

Local election in Gosport, England

- 2 May 2024

15 out of 28 seats to Gosport Borough Council 15 seats needed for a majority

	Majority party	Minority party	Third party
Leader	Peter Chegwyn	Graham Burgess	June Cully
Party	Liberal Democrats	Conservative	Labour
Seats before	16	10 (Note: Including two vacant seats last held by the Conservatives.)	2
Seats after	15	11 (Note: Including one vacant seat last held by the Conservatives.)	2
- Results by ward, including by-election in Lee West
Leader before election
Peter Chegwyn
Liberal Democrats
Leader after election
Peter Chegwyn
Liberal Democrats

The 2024 Gosport Borough Council election was held on Thursday 2 May 2024, alongside the other local elections in the United Kingdom on the same day. There were 15 seats up for election, being the usual half of the 28 members of Gosport Borough Council in Hampshire, plus a vacancy in Lee West ward.

The council remained under Liberal Democrat majority control.

== Background ==
Gosport has historically been controlled by all 3 major parties. Labour controlled the council from its creation to 1976, when the Conservatives won a majority. This lasted until 1990 when the council fell into no overall control, before being gained by the Liberal Democrats in 1991. At the 1998 election, the council again fell into no overall control, and was gained by the Conservatives in 2010.

The 2022 election was to elect all seats following boundary changes. In that election, the Liberal Democrats won a majority, with 16 seats and a 40.9% vote share. The Conservatives won 10 with 42.8%, and Labour won 2 with 11.7%. The 2024 election is for seats held by the candidate who were returned in 2022 with the second-highest number of votes.

== Previous council composition ==
After 2022 election		Before 2024 election		After 2024 election		Current	
Party	Seats	Party	Seats	Party	Seats	Party	Seats
Liberal Democrats	16	Liberal Democrats	16	Liberal Democrats	15	Liberal Democrats	15
Conservative	10	Conservative	9	Conservative	10	Conservative	10
Labour	2	Labour	2	Labour	2	Labour	3

Changes 2022–2024:

- March 2024: John Beavis (Conservative) resigns; seat left vacant until 2024 election
- April 2024: Maggie Morgan (Conservative) dies; seat left vacant at time of May 2024 elections, with by-election subsequently arranged for 4 July 2024.
- July 2024: Jonathan Brown (Labour) wins Grange and Alver Valley seat in July 2024 by-election

== Summary ==
=== Election result ===
2024 Gosport Borough Council election
Party	This election			Full council			This election		
Party	Seats	Net	Seats %	Other	Total	Total %	Votes	Votes %	+/−
Liberal Democrats	8	▼1	53.3	7	15	53.6	7,227	36.7	–4.2
Conservative	6	▲1	40.0	5	11	39.3	8,644	43.9	+1.1
Labour	1	Steady	6.7	1	2	7.1	2,969	15.1	+3.4
Green	0	Steady	0.0	0	0	0.0	489	2.5	–1.6
Reform	0	Steady	0.0	0	0	0.0	163	0.8	+0.6
Independent	0	Steady	0.0	0	0	0.0	107	0.5	+0.3
Heritage	0	Steady	0.0	0	0	0.0	79	0.4	N/A

== Ward results ==
An asterisk denotes an incumbent councillor seeking re-election.

=== Alverstoke ===
Alverstoke
Party	Candidate	Votes	%	±%
Conservative	Zoe Huggins*	1,010	50.8	+9.6
Liberal Democrats	Adele Earle	763	38.3	−0.7
Labour	Jonathan Eaton	217	10.9	+2.1
Turnout		1,990		
Conservative hold		Swing		

=== Anglesey ===
Anglesey
Party	Candidate	Votes	%	±%
Conservative	Alan Scard*	894	59.8	+3.8
Liberal Democrats	Deborah Sherman	335	22.4	−6.3
Labour	Linda Hall	154	10.3	−6.7
Green	James Kirkham	113	7.6	N/A
Turnout		1,496		
Conservative hold		Swing		

=== Bridgemary ===
Bridgemary
Party	Candidate	Votes	%	±%
Liberal Democrats	Bob Maynard*	570	48.5	−2.5
Conservative	Kath Jones	450	38.3	+4.3
Labour	Margaret Williams	156	13.3	+2.6
Turnout		1,176		
Liberal Democrats hold		Swing		

=== Brockhurst and Privett ===
Brockhurst and Privett
Party	Candidate	Votes	%	±%
Liberal Democrats	Thomas Finn	522	45.8	−6.0
Conservative	Robbie Beech	362	31.8	±0.0
Labour	Rick Bolger	155	13.6	+2.0
Green	Jane Staffieri	100	8.8	N/A
Turnout		1,139		
Liberal Democrats hold		Swing		

=== Elson ===
Elson
Party	Candidate	Votes	%	±%
Liberal Democrats	Richard Earle*	682	54.2	−2.2
Conservative	Alan Neville	300	23.8	+1.3
Labour	Jess Cully	137	10.9	+0.8
Heritage	Lisa Englefield	79	6.3	N/A
Green	Kathryn Kelly	60	4.8	−2.9
Turnout		1,258		
Liberal Democrats hold		Swing		

=== Forton ===
Forton
Party	Candidate	Votes	%	±%
Liberal Democrats	Peter Chegwyn*	521	47.9	−10.0
Conservative	Simon Bellord	240	22.1	−3.5
Reform	Paddy Bergin	163	15.0	N/A
Labour	Tynan Bryant	163	15.0	−3.1
Turnout		1,087		
Liberal Democrats hold		Swing		

=== Grange and Alver Valley ===
Grange and Alver Valley
Party	Candidate	Votes	%	±%
Conservative	Tony Jessop*	332	38.6	−0.6
Labour	Jonathan Brown	321	37.3	−0.2
Liberal Democrats	Clive Foster-Reed	207	24.1	−7.4
Turnout		860		
Conservative hold		Swing		

=== Harbourside and Town ===
Harbourside and Town
Party	Candidate	Votes	%	±%
Labour	Alan Durrant*	465	40.6	−7.6
Conservative	Lesley Meenaghan	435	38.0	+1.5
Independent	Mike Critchley	107	9.3	N/A
Liberal Democrats	Mike Ewin	96	8.4	−4.4
Green	Ken Hawkins	43	3.8	N/A
Turnout		1,146		
Labour hold		Swing		

=== Hardway ===
Hardway
Party	Candidate	Votes	%	±%
Liberal Democrats	Kirsty Cox*	626	45.3	−8.3
Conservative	Diane Furlong	527	38.2	+3.9
Labour	Simon Davis	158	11.4	+2.2
Green	Tony Sudworth	70	5.1	N/A
Turnout		1,381		
Liberal Democrats hold		Swing		

=== Lee East ===
Lee East
Party	Candidate	Votes	%	±%
Liberal Democrats	Kirsten Bradley*	760	47.1	−4.2
Conservative	Angela Batten	726	45.0	+7.2
Labour	Chris Percival	129	8.0	−3.1
Turnout		1,615		
Liberal Democrats hold		Swing		

=== Lee West ===
Lee West (2)
Party	Candidate	Votes	%	±%
Conservative	Dan Hayes	1,018	74.9	+5.5
Conservative	Stevyn Ricketts	954	70.1	+7.1
Liberal Democrats	Lizzie Maynard-Seal	381	28.0	N/A
Labour	Anne Cruddas	367	27.0	+4.2
Turnout		1,360		
Conservative hold		Swing		
Conservative hold		Swing		

=== Leesland and Newtown ===
Leesland and Newtown
Party	Candidate	Votes	%	±%
Liberal Democrats	Julie Westerby*	749	50.1	−4.9
Conservative	Peceli Uluiviti	406	27.2	+1.4
Labour	Hilary Percival	236	15.8	+3.3
Green	Miles Plested	103	6.9	−3.6
Turnout		1,494		
Liberal Democrats hold		Swing		

=== Peel Common ===
Peel Common
Party	Candidate	Votes	%	±%
Conservative	Supriya Namdeo	626	48.4	+10.2
Liberal Democrats	Stephen Marshall	525	40.6	−11.8
Labour	Daniel Stratton	142	11.0	−6.4
Turnout		1,293		
Conservative gain from Liberal Democrats		Swing		

=== Rowner and Holbrook ===
Rowner and Holbrook
Party	Candidate	Votes	%	±%
Liberal Democrats	Murray Johnston*	490	47.9	±0.0
Conservative	Gary Walker	364	35.6	−2.0
Labour	Claire Percival	169	16.5	+5.1
Turnout		1,023		
Liberal Democrats hold		Swing		

== Changes 2024-2026 ==
=== By-elections ===
==== Grange and Alver Valley ====
Grange and Alver Valley by-election: 4th July 2024
Party	Candidate	Votes	%	±%
Labour	Jonathan Brown	749	38.6	+1.3
Conservative	Robbie George Beech	639	32.9	−5.7
Liberal Democrats	Clive Foster-Reed	307	15.8	−8.7
Independent	Dale Fletcher	243	13	N/A
Majority		110	6.3	N/A
Turnout		1,938	44	
Registered electors		4,509		
Labour gain from Conservative		Swing	▲2.6	

==== Harbourside and Town ====
Harbourside and Town by-election: 21 November 2024
Party	Candidate	Votes	%	±%
Conservative	Lesley Meenaghan	445	48.5	+10.5
Labour	Tynan Bryant	255	27.8	–12.8
Liberal Democrats	Mike Ewin	108	11.8	+3.4
Reform	Paddy Bergin	85	9.3	N/A
Independent	Dale Fletcher	13	1.4	N/A
Heritage	Lisa Englefield	11	1.2	N/A
Majority		190	20.7	N/A
Turnout		917	25.0	
Registered electors		3,679		
Conservative gain from Labour		Swing	▲11.7	

=== Bridgemary ===
Bridgemary by-election: 15 January 2026
Party	Candidate	Votes	%	±%
Reform	Paul Carter	604	42.5	N/A
Liberal Democrats	Stephen James Marshall	575	40.5	−8
Conservative	Kath Jones	207	14.6	−23.7
Labour	Claire Percival	35	2.5	−10.8
Turnout		1,421	32%	
Reform gain from Liberal Democrats		Swing		

The by-election was caused by the death of Liberal Democrat councillor Bob Maynard on 22 November 2025.
