= 2026 Gosport Borough Council election =

2026 English local government election

- 7 May 2026

14 out of 28 seats to Gosport Borough Council 15 seats needed for a majority
- Registered: 62,109
- Turnout: 26,999; 43.5%
	First party	Second party	Third party
Leader	Stephen Philpott		Peter Chegwyn
Party	Conservative	Reform	Liberal Democrats
Last election	11 seats, 43.9%	0 seats, 0.8%	15 seats, 36.7%
Seats before	12	1	13
Seats won	5	9	0
Seats after	11	10	6
Seat change	▼1	▲9	▼7
Popular vote	7,956	9,122	5,462
Percentage	29.9%	34.3%	20.5%
Swing	▼14.0%	▲33.5%	▼16.2%
	Fourth party	Fifth party
Party	Independent	Labour
Last election	0 seats, 0.5%	2 seats, 15.1%
Seats before	1	2
Seats won	0	0
Seats after	1	0
Seat change	Steady	▼2
Popular vote	Did not stand	1,279
Percentage	Did not stand	4.8%
Swing	▼0.5%	▼10.3%
- Winner of each seat at the 2026 Gosport Borough Council election.
Leader before election
Peter Chegwyn
Liberal Democrat
No overall control (Note: Liberal Democrat minority)
Leader after election
Zoe Huggins
Conservative
No overall control (Note: Conservative minority)

The 2026 Gosport Borough Council election was held on 7 May 2026, alongside the other local elections across the United Kingdom being held on the same day, to elect 14 of 28 members of Gosport Borough Council in Hampshire, England.

Prior to the election, the council was under no overall control, being run by a Liberal Democrat minority administration. The Liberal Democrats lost every seat they were defending at this election. They were overtaken by both the Conservatives and Reform UK. After the election, the Conservatives chose Zoe Huggins to be their new group leader. She was appointed as the new leader of the council at the subsequent annual council meeting on 20 May 2026, leading a Conservative minority administration.

== Summary ==
=== Background ===
In 2024, the Liberal Democrats retained control of the council.

=== Council composition ===
After 2024 election		Before 2026 election	
Party	Seats	Party	Seats
Liberal Democrats	15	Liberal Democrats	13
Conservative	10	Conservative	11
Labour	2	Labour	2
Independent	0	Independent	1
Reform	0	Reform	1
Vacant	1	Vacant	0

Changes 2024–2026:

- April 2024: Maggie Morgan (Conservative) dies – by-election held July 2024
- July 2024: Jonathan Brown (Labour) gains by-election from Conservatives
- September 2024: Alan Durrant (Labour) dies – by-election held November 2024
- November 2024: Lesley Meenaghan (Conservative) gains by-election from Labour
- November 2025: Bob Maynard (Liberal Democrats) dies – by-election held January 2026
- January 2026:
  - Paul Carter (Reform) gains by-election from Liberal Democrats
  - Kirsten Bradley (Liberal Democrats) leaves party to sit as an independent

=== Election result ===
2026 Gosport Borough Council election
Party	This election				Full council			This election		
Party	Candidates	Seats	Net	Seats %	Other	Total	Total %	Votes	Votes %	+/−
Conservative	{{{candidates}}}	5	▼1	35.7	6	11	39.3	7,956	29.9	–14.0
Reform	{{{candidates}}}	9	▲9	64.3	1	10	35.7	9,122	34.3	+33.5
Liberal Democrats	{{{candidates}}}	0	▼7	0.0	6	6	21.4	5,462	20.5	–16.2
Independent	{{{candidates}}}	0	Steady	0.0	1	1	3.6	N/A (Note: Did not stand candidates.)	N/A	–0.5
Green	{{{candidates}}}	0	Steady	0.0	0	0	0.0	2,766	10.4	+7.9
Labour	{{{candidates}}}	0	▼2	0.0	0	0	0.0	1,279	4.8	–10.3

== Incumbents ==
Ward	Incumbent councillor	Party	Re-standing
Alverstoke	Kevin Casey	Conservative	Yes
Anglesey	Philip Raffaelli	Conservative	No
Bridgemary	Stephen Hammond	Liberal Democrats	Yes
Brockhurst & Privett	Robert Hylands	Liberal Democrats	Yes
Elson	Sue Ballard	Liberal Democrats	Yes
Forton	Mervin Bradley	Liberal Democrats	Yes
Grange & Alver Valley	Jonathan Brown	Labour	Yes
Harbourside & Town	June Cully	Labour	No
Hardway	Jamie Hutchison	Liberal Democrats	No
Lee East	Graham Burgess	Conservative	Yes
Lee West	Stevyn Ricketts	Conservative	Yes
Leesland & Newtown	Dawn Kelly	Liberal Democrats	Yes
Peel Common	Stephen Philpott	Conservative	Yes
Rowner & Holbrook	David Herridge	Liberal Democrats	Yes

== Candidates ==
=== Alverstoke ===
Alverstoke
Party	Candidate	Votes	%	±%
Conservative	Kevin Casey*	1,131	43.0	–7.8
Reform	Benhamin Searle	664	25.3	N/A
Liberal Democrats	Lizzie Maynard-Seal	595	22.6	–15.7
Green	Aid Smalley	238	9.1	N/A
Majority		467	17.7	+5.2
Turnout		2,628	53.5	
Registered electors		4,908		
Conservative hold				

=== Anglesey ===
Anglesey
Party	Candidate	Votes	%	±%
Conservative	Robbie Beech	1,011	50.1	–9.7
Reform	Debbie McGregor	487	24.1	N/A
Liberal Democrats	Charlie Hylands	265	13.1	–9.3
Green	Emma Bell	255	12.6	+5.0
Majority		524	26.0	–37.4
Turnout		2,018	54.7	
Registered electors		3,690		
Conservative hold				

=== Bridgemary ===
Bridgemary
Party	Candidate	Votes	%	±%
Reform	Clare Bond	825	45.6	N/A
Liberal Democrats	Steve Hammond*	671	37.1	–11.4
Conservative	Peter Stonestreet	182	10.1	–28.2
Green	Zoe Aspinall	131	7.2	N/A
Majority		154	8.5	N/A
Turnout		1,809	40.4	
Registered electors		4,479		
Reform gain from Liberal Democrats				

=== Brockhurst & Privett ===
Brockhurst & Privett
Party	Candidate	Votes	%	±%
Reform	David Marshall	616	35.1	N/A
Liberal Democrats	Rob Hylands*	581	33.1	–12.7
Conservative	George McAleese	354	20.2	–11.6
Green	Karyn Ashcroft	156	8.9	+0.1
Labour	Danny Mower	48	2.7	–10.9
Majority		35	2.0	N/A
Turnout		1,763	41.9	
Registered electors		4,206		
Reform gain from Liberal Democrats				

=== Elson ===
Elson
Party	Candidate	Votes	%	±%
Reform	Antony Stanton	784	39.4	N/A
Liberal Democrats	Sue Ballard*	694	34.8	–19.4
Conservative	Alan Neville	292	14.7	–9.1
Green	Kathryn Kelly	174	8.7	+3.9
Labour	Stephen Osborne	48	2.4	–8.5
Majority		90	4.6	N/A
Turnout		1,997	43.4	
Registered electors		4,602		
Reform gain from Liberal Democrats				

=== Forton ===
Forton
Party	Candidate	Votes	%	±%
Reform	James Figgins	538	35.8	+20.8
Liberal Democrats	Marv Bradley*	482	32.0	–15.9
Conservative	Robert Thompson	211	14.0	–8.1
Green	Lynsey Delin	180	12.0	N/A
Labour	Suzanne Geary	93	6.2	–8.8
Majority		56	3.8	N/A
Turnout		1,513	33.4	
Registered electors		4,535		
Reform gain from Liberal Democrats		Swing	▲18.4	

=== Grange & Alver Valley ===
Grange & Alver Valley
Party	Candidate	Votes	%	±%
Reform	Colin Towell	577	43.5	N/A
Labour Co-op	Jonathan Brown*	298	22.5	–14.8
Conservative	Ellis Weekes	225	17.0	–21.6
Green	Mark Mudie	127	9.6	N/A
Liberal Democrats	Clive Foster-Reed	99	7.5	–16.6
Majority		279	21.0	–19.7
Turnout		1,332	29.6	
Registered electors		4,499		
Reform gain from Labour Co-op				

=== Harbourside & Town ===
Harbourside & Town
Party	Candidate	Votes	%	±%
Reform	Taylor Kirkham	481	32.6	N/A
Conservative	Gary Walker	420	28.5	–9.5
Labour	Tynan Bryant	254	17.2	–23.4
Green	Nikki Cameron	182	12.3	+8.5
Liberal Democrats	Paul Hylands	137	9.3	+0.9
Majority		61	4.1	N/A
Turnout		1,486	40.5	
Registered electors		3,669		
Reform gain from Labour				

=== Hardway ===
Hardway
Party	Candidate	Votes	%	±%
Reform	Philip Sparrow	770	38.5	N/A
Liberal Democrats	Mike Ewin	529	26.5	–18.9
Conservative	Simon Bellord	412	20.6	–17.6
Green	Anthony Sudworth	201	10.1	+5.0
Labour	Tom Bolger	88	4.4	–7.0
Majority		241	12.0	N/A
Turnout		2,004	43.1	
Registered electors		4,645		
Reform gain from Liberal Democrats				

=== Lee East ===
Lee East
Party	Candidate	Votes	%	±%
Conservative	Graham Burgess*	1,023	53.7	+8.7
Reform	Ian Brown	536	28.2	N/A
Green	Matt Reeve-Fowkes	345	18.1	N/A
Majority		487	25.5	N/A
Turnout		2,215	48.5	
Registered electors		4,569		
Conservative hold				

=== Lee West ===
Lee West
Party	Candidate	Votes	%	±%
Conservative	Stevyn Ricketts	1,275	53.5	–4.1
Reform	Gill Farrington	620	26.0	N/A
Green	James Kirkham	267	11.2	N/A
Labour	Anne Cruddas	221	9.3	–11.5
Majority		655	27.5	N/A
Turnout		2,395	54.9	
Registered electors		4,365		
Conservative hold				

=== Leesland & Newtown ===
Leesland & Newtown
Party	Candidate	Votes	%	±%
Reform	Elly Newman	737	33.2	N/A
Liberal Democrats	Dawn Kelly*	682	30.7	–19.4
Conservative	David Gary	456	20.5	–6.7
Green	Miles Plested	237	10.7	+3.8
Labour	Hilary Percival	110	5.0	–10.8
Majority		55	2.5	N/A
Turnout		2,226	42.8	
Registered electors		5,207		
Reform gain from Liberal Democrats				

=== Peel Common ===
Peel Common
Party	Candidate	Votes	%	±%
Conservative	Stephen Philpott*	738	38.5	–9.9
Reform	Spencer Gregson-Gray	682	35.6	N/A
Liberal Democrats	Debbie Sherman	310	16.2	–24.4
Green	Lucy MacLennan	123	6.4	N/A
Labour	Jess Cully	63	3.3	–7.7
Majority		56	2.9	–4.9
Turnout		1,929	45.5	
Registered electors		4,235		
Conservative hold				

=== Rowner & Holbrook ===
Rowner & Holbrook
Party	Candidate	Votes	%	±%
Reform	Paul Jacobs	805	48.7	N/A
Liberal Democrats	Dave Herridge*	417	25.2	–22.7
Conservative	Diane Furlong	226	13.7	–21.9
Green	Jane Staffieri	150	9.1	N/A
Labour	Claire Percival	56	3.4	–13.1
Majority		388	23.5	N/A
Turnout		1,662	36.9	
Registered electors		4,500		
Reform gain from Liberal Democrats				

== Post-election changes ==
=== Hardway by-election ===
Hardway by-election: 3 December 2026
Party	Candidate	Votes	%	±%
Liberal Democrats	Lesley Carr			
Conservative	Darren Huggins			
Reform	Terry McGregor			
Labour	Daniel Mower			
Green	Miles Plested			
Restore	Justin Waldron			
Majority				
Turnout				
		Swing		
