= Forton Lake =

Tidal creek in Gosport, Hampshire

Coordinates: 50.8040°N 1.1302°W

Forton Lake at sunrise

Forton Lake is a tidal creek located in the town of Gosport, Hampshire. A small area of the lake is within the grounds of St Vincent College. The locality is the subject of a painting by Martin Snape, which hangs in Gosport Town Hall. The Lake itself is resident to local fish species, including shoal bass and pollack.

== Archaeology ==
Forton Lake is home to around thirty wrecked vessels of varying type, the majority of which arrived at the lake in the twentieth century. Among these are a Second World War motor minesweeper, MMS 293, which served in the Royal Navy with the Expeditionary Force of the Allied Naval Commander-in-Chief in 1944, and a former Gosport ferry named Vadne, which was built in 1939 and ferried passengers at Portsmouth Harbour from 1939 to 1943 and from 1946 to 1965.

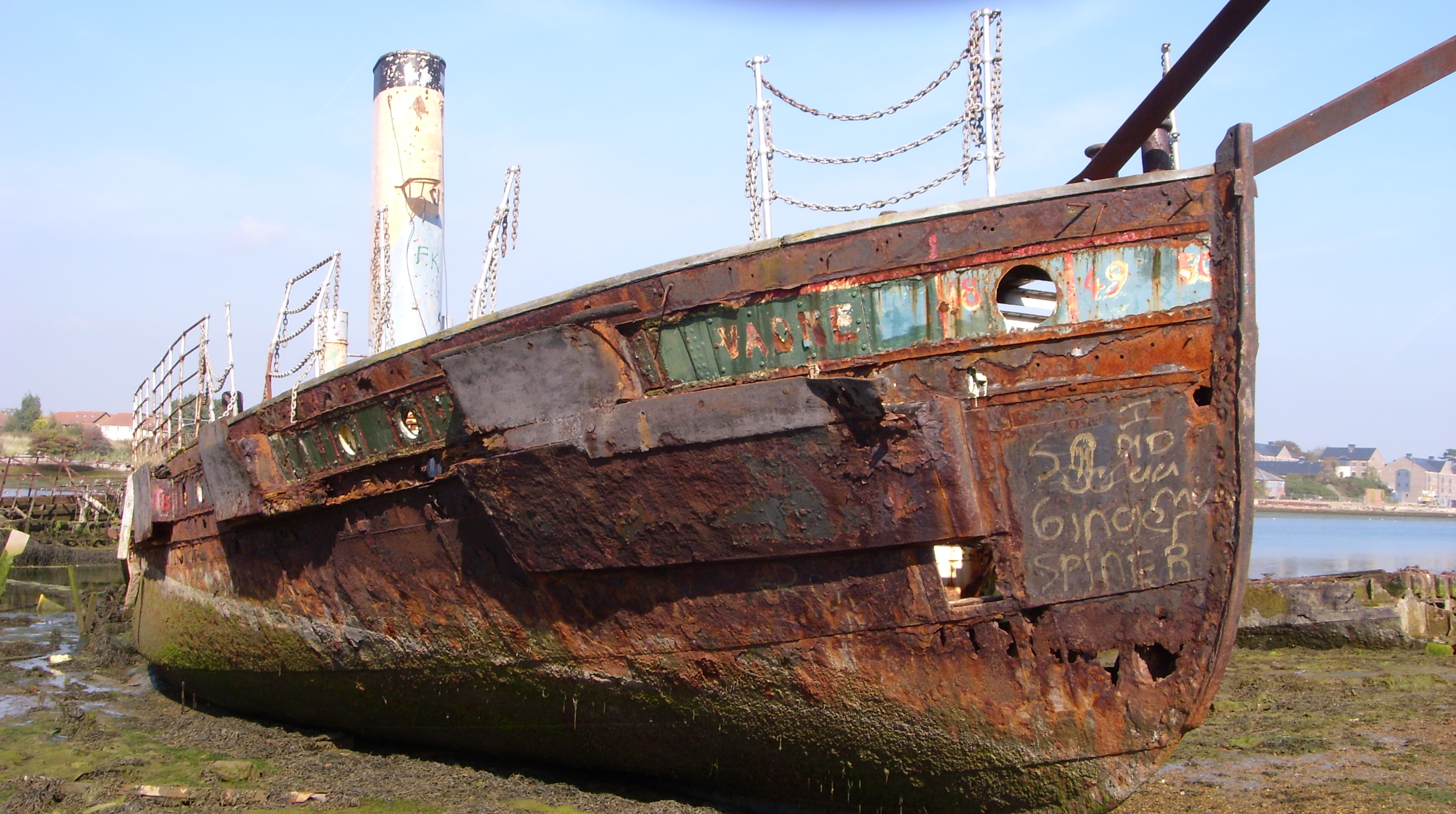
The former Gosport ferry Vadne at Forton Lake

Motor Minesweeper 293 wrecked at Forton Lake

Forton Lake was the subject of a brief archaeological survey in 1997, and more recently the focus of the Forton Lake Archaeology Project, organised by the Nautical Archaeology Society and Hampshire and Wight Trust for Maritime Archaeology, from 2006 to 2008. This project involved local residents in attempting to uncover the heritage that had lain undiscovered at the lake. Fieldwork for another archaeology project, the Forton Lake Archaeology Project 2009, was completed over the period of four months from June through to September.

A motor fishing vessel prepared for survey work

Forton Lake is known to have been in use since the early Saxon times, and its use has been continuous. There is a multitude of wrecks at the site such as Vadne, would have served the general public on a daily basis. In addition to this, there is a D-Day landing craft amongst other wrecks too.

The east end of Forton Lake, as it becomes Portsmouth Harbour, is home to a footbridge built in 2000 as part of the Millennium Project, which sought to modernise the Gosport waterfront in celebration and anticipation of the year 2000.

== Bibliography ==
The Gosport Discovery Centre Local History Collection contains these articles:

- Forton Road Conservation Area Action Plan (1994)
- Guide to St John's Church, Forton (1998/9)
- Turner, O. E. St John's School, Forton (1992)
