= Martin Snape =

English painter

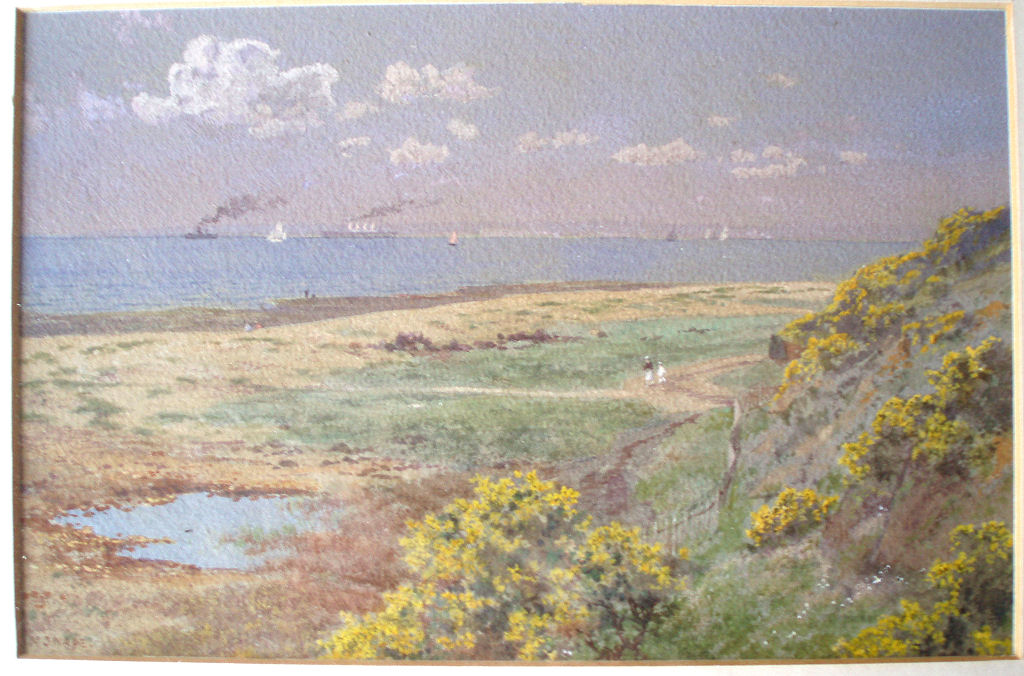
Hillhead (1919)

Martin Snape (31 December 1852 – 24 November 1930) was an English painter of the Victorian and Edwardian era.

== Biography ==
Born in Gosport in 1852, Snape worked in a variety of media (oils, watercolours, engraving, etc.). He concentrated mainly on topographical subjects including landscapes from the Meon Valley, and shore and maritime scenes around Portsmouth Harbour and his home town of Gosport. He exhibited at the Royal Academy between 1874 and 1901.

Living in Spring Garden Lane, near Gosport railway station, Snape was associated with the Gosport area all his life. In 1922 he was commissioned to design the seal for the newly created Borough of Gosport (though the council logo is now a stylised modern version, the original design is still used by the Gosport Borough Football Club). In 1923 he was chosen to give the speech of welcome to the 91st Annual conference of the British Medical Association which was being held in Portsmouth.

He died in 1930 but his most famous painting, Forton Creek, one of a series, still hangs in Gosport Town Hall. Snape is buried in the churchyard at St Mary's, the parish church of Rowner. He had a great fondness for the village of Rowner, which was the subject of many of his paintings and was a personal friend of a former rector, the Revd Edward Prideaux-Brune. The new premises of the charity Gosport Voluntary Action has been named Martin Snape House in his memory.
