= Gosport Town Hall =

Municipal building in Gosport, England

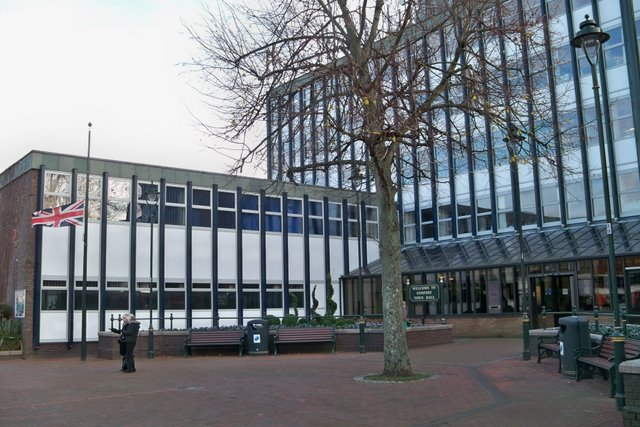

- Shown in Hampshire
- 50.7948°N 1.1242°W
- Location: High Street, Gosport

History
- Built: 1964

Site notes
- Architect(s): W. H. Saunders & Son
- Architectural style: International Style

Gosport Town Hall is a municipal structure in the High Street, Gosport, Hampshire, England. The structure currently serves as the headquarters of Gosport Borough Council.

== History ==
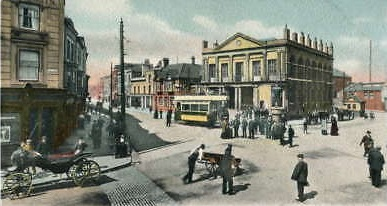
Gosport Town Hall and Market House

The first municipal building in Gosport was an ancient market hall and courthouse in the Middle Row which, in its original form, was a gift from the Bishop of Winchester, Henry of Blois, in the 12th century.

By the early 19th century the building in the Middle Row, which was in the centre of the High Street, was considered an obstruction of traffic and a local businessman, Robert Cruickshank, led an initiative to demolish the old building and to erect a new building at the shore end of the High Street. The new town hall and market house was designed in the neoclassical style, built in brick with ashlar stone dressings at a cost £15,000 and was completed in 1812.

The design involved a symmetrical main frontage with five bays facing The Hard. There were three openings on the ground floor flanked by Doric order columns supporting a balcony, and there were five sash windows on the first floor flanked by Ionic order pilasters supporting a pediment with an oculus in the tympanum. The market house was hit by German bombing and reduced to a shell during the Portsmouth Blitz in August 1940. However, the Dive Café, in the basement of the market house, remained a popular venue into the 1950s.

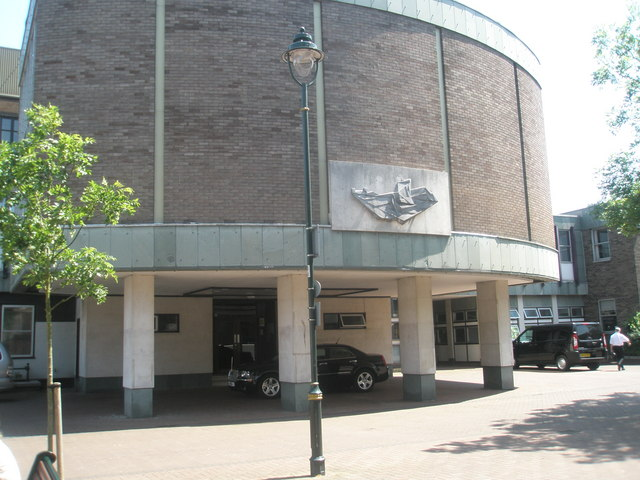
The curved council chamber projecting from the west side of the building.

In the early 1960s, civic leaders decided to demolish the remains of the market house and to erect a new town hall on the south side of the High Street. The new building was designed by W. H. Saunders & Son in the International Style, built in concrete and glass and was completed in 1964. The design involved a rectangular five-storey main frontage with a pair of two-storey wings jutting out towards the High Street to form a courtyard. The main structure was faced with curtain walling and was supplemented by a curved formation containing the council chamber, which was cantilevered out to the west and allowed vehicular access at ground floor level.

Works of art in the town hall include a painting by the local artist, Martin Snape, depicting Forton Creek.
