= 2012 Gosport Borough Council election =

2012 UK local government election

2012 Gosport Borough Council Election
← 2010	3 May 2012	2014 →

17 of 35 seats to Gosport Borough Council 18 seats needed for a majority
	First party	Second party	Third party
Party	Conservative	Labour	Liberal Democrats
Seats before	22	3	9
Seats won	12	3	2
Seats after	24	5	5
Popular vote	9,312	4,585	3,242
Percentage	51.5%	25.3%	17.9%
Council control before election
Conservative
Council control after election
Conservative

The 2012 Gosport Council election was held on 3 May 2012 to elect members of the Gosport Council in England. This was the same day as other 2012 United Kingdom local elections. The Conservatives gained three seats from the Liberal Democrats, whilst Labour gained one seat each from the Conservatives and Liberal Democrats. Both Labour and the Conservatives saw an increased vote share, whilst the Liberal Democrats' vote share fell.

After the election the composition of the council was:

- Conservative: 24
- Labour: 5
- Liberal Democrats: 5

== Election result ==
Gosport local election result 2012
Party	Seats	Gains	Losses	Net gain/loss	Seats %	Votes %	Votes	+/−
Conservative	12	3	1	▲3		51.5	9,312	▲3.7
Labour	3	2	0	▲2		25.3	4,585	▲5.2
Liberal Democrats	2	0	4	▼4		17.9	3,242	▼17.9
UKIP	0	0	0	Steady		3.2	584	▲1.0
Green	0	0	0	Steady		1.0	185	▼0.2
Independent	0	0	0	Steady		0.8	137	▼0.6
BNP	0	0	0	Steady		0.3	48	▲0.3

== Ward results ==
=== Alverstoke ===
Alverstoke
Party	Candidate	Votes	%	±%
Conservative	Mark Hook	791	60.7	▼2.8
Labour	James Fox	220	16.9	▲7.0
UKIP	Judith Smith	194	14.9	▲9.4
Liberal Democrats	Kirsten Ballard	99	7.60	▼7.3
Majority		571		
Turnout				
Conservative hold		Swing		

=== Anglesey ===
Anglesey
Party	Candidate	Votes	%	±%
Conservative	Robert Forder	854	78.4	▲11.6
Liberal Democrats	Austin Hicks	254	20.3	▼14.3
Labour	Belinda Baker	141	11.3	▼2.7
Majority		600		
Turnout				
Conservative gain from Liberal Democrats		Swing		

=== Bridgemary North ===
Bridgemary North
Party	Candidate	Votes	%	±%
Labour	Jill Wright	708	62.9	▲15.5
Conservative	Richard Bateman	418	37.1	▲2.5
Majority		290		
Turnout				
Labour gain from Conservative		Swing		

=== Bridgemary South ===
Bridgemary South
Party	Candidate	Votes	%	±%
Conservative	Michael Geddes	450	51.8	▼5.8
Labour	Alan Durrant	418	48.2	▲5.8
Majority		269		
Turnout				
Conservative hold		Swing		

=== Brockhurst ===
Brockhurst
Party	Candidate	Votes	%	±%
Liberal Democrats	Robert Hylands	554	55.9	▲14.0
Conservative	Laura Elshaw	277	28.0	▼8.8
Labour	Hugh Reynolds	160	16.1	▲1.0
Majority		571		
Turnout				
Liberal Democrats hold		Swing		

=== Christchurch ===
Christchurch
Party	Candidate	Votes	%	±%
Conservative	Richard Dickson	406	38.8	▼1.4
Liberal Democrats	Dawn Kelly	351	33.5	▼2.8
Labour	Chris Noakes	165	15.8	▲1.2
UKIP	Catherine Andrews	125	11.9	▲3
Majority		55		
Turnout				
Conservative hold		Swing		

=== Elson ===
Elson
Party	Candidate	Votes	%	±%
Conservative	Craig Hazel	463	43.9	▲4.6
Liberal Democrats	George Heaver	435	41.2	▼4.3
Labour	Jess Cully	157	14.9	▲6
Majority		28		
Turnout				
Conservative gain from Liberal Democrats		Swing		

=== Forton ===
Forton
Party	Candidate	Votes	%	±%
Labour	Keith Farr	309	34.6	▲5.3
Liberal Democrats	Stephen Pinder	287	32.2	▼7.7
Conservative	Dale Fletcher	188	21.1	▼9.7
UKIP	Andrew Rive	108	12.10	
Majority		22		
Turnout				
Labour gain from Liberal Democrats		Swing		

=== Grange ===
Grange
Party	Candidate	Votes	%	±%
Conservative	Margaret Morgan	222	49.70	▲6.9
Labour	Jane Bateman	131	29.3	▲15.7
Liberal Democrats	Paul Keeley	94	21.0	▼18.6
Majority		91		
Turnout				
Conservative hold		Swing		

=== Hardway ===
Hardway
Party	Candidate	Votes	%	±%
Conservative	Peter Langdon	596	56.2	▲11.5
Green	Andrea Smith	185	17.40	▲8.3
Labour	Paule Ripley	154	14.5	▲4
Liberal Democrats	Cyril Simpson	126	11.9	▲18.3
Majority		411		
Turnout				
Conservative hold		Swing		

=== Lee East ===
Lee East
Party	Candidate	Votes	%	±%
Conservative	Howard Burgess	866	66.70	▲5.0
Labour	Graham Giles	325	25.00	▲20.3
Liberal Democrats	James Bailey	107	8.2	▼13.8
Majority		541		
Turnout				
Conservative hold		Swing		

=== Lee West ===
Lee West
Party	Candidate	Votes	%	±%
Conservative	John Beavis	1,340	82.4	▲17.5
Labour	Jill Whitcher	286	17.60	▲7.0
Majority		1,054		
Turnout				
Conservative hold		Swing		

=== Leesland ===
Leesland
Party	Candidate	Votes	%	±%
Liberal Democrats	Maria Diffey	507	49.90	▲1.7
Conservative	George McAleese	293	28.8	▼12.3
Labour	Michael Freestone	121	11.9	▲0.9
Independent	David Smith	96	9.4	▲9.4
Majority		214		
Turnout				
Liberal Democrats hold		Swing		

=== Peel Common ===
Peel Common
Party	Candidate	Votes	%	±%
Conservative	Stephen Philpott	689	63.7	▲5.0
Labour	Martyn Davis	236	21.8	▼0.1
UKIP	Curtis Sinclair	157	14.5	▲14.5
Majority		453		
Turnout				
Conservative hold		Swing		

=== Privett ===
Privett
Party	Candidate	Votes	%	±%
Conservative	Keith Gill	685	63.4	▲17.8
Liberal Democrats	Andrea Bailey	203	18.8	▼22.9
Labour	Terance Robbins	193	17.9	▲5.2
Majority		482		
Turnout				
Conservative gain from Liberal Democrats		Swing		

=== Rowner and Holbrook ===
Rowner and Holbrook
Party	Candidate	Votes	%	±%
Conservative	Marcus Murphy	310	42.1	▼2.0
Labour	John Train	219	29.7	▲2.1
Liberal Democrats	Sandra Carter	167	22.7	▲22.7
Independent	James McGookin	41	5.6	▲5.6
Majority		91		
Turnout				
Conservative hold		Swing		

=== Town ===
Town
Party	Candidate	Votes	%	±%
Labour	Diane Searle	642	53.0	▲15.0
Conservative	Abigail Thomson	464	38.3	▲8.1
Liberal Democrats	Fungus Heather Carr	58	4.8	▼9.6
BNP	Sunny Martin	48	4.0	▲4.0
Majority		178		
Turnout				
Labour hold		Swing		
