= 2018 Gosport Borough Council election =

2018 UK local government election

2018 Gosport Borough Council Election
← 2016	3 May 2018	2021 →

17 of 34 seats to Gosport Borough Council 18 seats needed for a majority
	First party	Second party	Third party
Party	Liberal Democrats	Conservative	Labour
Seats before	9	19	4
Seats won	9	8	1
Seats after	14	18	2
Seat change	▲4	▼1	▼2
Popular vote	4,710	10,673	4,608
Percentage	22.9%	51.8%	22.4%
Council control before election
Conservative
Council control after election
Conservative

The 2018 Gosport Borough Council election took place on 3 May 2018 to elect members of Gosport Borough Council in England. This was on the same day as other local elections. The election saw the Liberal Democrats gain four seats: two from Labour, and one each from the Conservatives and UKIP. This reduced the Conservative Majority to one, remaining in control of the council, whilst UKIP lost their sole seat, in the Rowner and Holbrook ward.

== Voter ID trial ==
Gosport was one of five boroughs in England operating a voter ID trial, whereby voters had to bring a form of identification with them in order to vote. There was some criticism of the pilot by local politicians ahead of the vote, and in the event 54 people were unable to vote as a result of the trial. The Electoral Commission concluded from the study that "our findings suggest that the 2018 local elections in Gosport were not significantly affected by the voter ID pilot in either its impact on voters or on the administration of the poll. However, it is important to be cautious when drawing conclusions from this pilot about the impact of any wider application of voter ID."

== Results summary ==
Gosport Borough Council election 2018
Party	Seats	Gains	Losses	Net gain/loss	Seats %	Votes %	Votes	+/−
Conservative	8	1	2	▼1	44.4	51.8	10,673	▼1.1
Liberal Democrats	9	4	0	▲4	50.0	22.9	4,710	▲6.6
Labour	1	0	2	▼2	5.6	22.4	4,608	▼2.2
Green	0	0	0	Steady	0.0	2.3	477	▼0.3
Independent	0	0	0	Steady	0.0	0.4	77	Steady
UKIP	0	0	1	▼1	0.0	0.3	63	▼2.9

== Ward results ==
=== Alverstoke ===
Alverstoke
Party	Candidate	Votes	%	±%
Conservative	Kevin Casey	1,145	78.8	▲3.5
Labour	Jonathan Eaton	308	21.2	▼3.5
Majority		837	57.6	▲7.0
Conservative hold		Swing		

=== Anglesey ===
Anglesey
Party	Candidate	Votes	%	±%
Conservative	Alan Scard	1,011	71.3	▼3.3
Labour	Paul Noakes	327	28.7	▲3.3
Majority		684	42.6	▼6.6
Conservative hold		Swing		

=== Bridgemary North ===
Bridgemary North
Party	Candidate	Votes	%	±%
Liberal Democrats	Martin Pepper	574	53.1	▲53.1
Conservative	Peter Batty	278	25.7	▼2.3
Labour	Alan Durrant	228	21.1	▼50.9
Majority		296	27.4	▼16.6
Liberal Democrats gain from Labour		Swing		

=== Bridgemary South ===
Bridgemary South
Party	Candidate	Votes	%	±%
Conservative	Linda Batty	445	43.2	▼10.3
Labour	James Fox	300	29.2	▼17.3
Liberal Democrats	Stephen Marshall	284	27.6	▲27.6
Majority		145	14.0	▲7.0
Conservative gain from Labour		Swing		

=== Brockhurst ===
Brockhurst
Party	Candidate	Votes	%	±%
Liberal Democrats	Austin Hicks	452	41.2	▼15.5
Conservative	Simon Bellord	381	34.8	▲7.1
Labour	Stephanie Brazier	144	13.1	▲3.6
UKIP	David Foster	63	5.7	▲5.7
Green	Jane Staffieri	56	5.1	▼0.9
Majority		72	6.4	▼22.6
Liberal Democrats hold		Swing		

=== Christchurch ===
Christchurch
Party	Candidate	Votes	%	±%
Liberal Democrats	Julie Westerby	575	45.5	▲1.5
Conservative	Wayne Ronayne	403	31.9	▼4.4
Labour	Chris Percival	285	22.6	▲5.9
Majority		172	13.6	▲2.9
Liberal Democrats gain from Conservative		Swing		

=== Elson ===
Elson
Party	Candidate	Votes	%	±%
Liberal Democrats	Susan Ballard	703	61.5	▲6.7
Conservative	Craig Hazel	304	26.6	▼8.1
Independent	Alan Neville	77	6.7	▲6.7
Labour	Emma Smith	59	5.2	▼5.3
Majority		399	34.9	▲14.8
Liberal Democrats hold		Swing		

=== Forton ===
Forton
Party	Candidate	Votes	%	±%
Liberal Democrats	Clive Foster-Reed	411	46.4	▲12.4
Conservative	Gary Walker	254	28.7	▲9.7
Labour	Daniel Smith	180	20.3	▲0.8
Green	Monica Cassidy	40	4.5	▲4.5
Majority		157	17.7	▲3.9
Liberal Democrats hold		Swing		

=== Grange ===
Grange
Party	Candidate	Votes	%	±%
Conservative	Tony Jessop	485	62.5	▲22.4
Labour	Hetty Ollivant	198	25.5	▲9.9
Liberal Democrats	Lynne Pyle	93	12.0	▼7.3
Majority		287	37.0	▲21.9
Conservative hold		Swing		

=== Hardway ===
Hardway
Party	Candidate	Votes	%	±%
Liberal Democrats	James Hutchison	718	52.0	▲24.9
Conservative	Roger Allen	522	37.8	▼18.2
Labour	Mark Smith	142	10.3	▼6.6
Majority		196	14.2	▼14.7
Liberal Democrats gain from Conservative		Swing		

=== Lee East ===
Lee East
Party	Candidate	Votes	%	±%
Conservative	Piers Bateman	1,133	71.9	▲0.1
Labour	Caroline Osborne	443	28.1	▲9.7
Majority		690	43.8	▼9.6
Conservative hold		Swing		

=== Lee West ===
Lee West
Party	Candidate	Votes	%	±%
Conservative	Chris Carter	1,447	80.8	▲3.4
Labour	Jill Whitcher	344	19.2	▲7.4
Majority		1,103	61.6	▼4.0
Conservative hold		Swing		

=== Leesland ===
Leesland
Party	Candidate	Votes	%	±%
Liberal Democrats	Peter Chegwyn	544	46.1	▲3.6
Liberal Democrats	David Herridge	439	37.2	▼5.3
Conservative	Rebecca Stares	370	31.4	▼1.6
Conservative	Natasha Hook	336	28.5	▼4.5
Green	Sam Pollard	222	18.8	▲6.8
Labour	Alison Mandrill	151	12.8	▲0.3
Labour	Charis Noakes	119	10.1	▼2.4
Green	David Sekules	106	9.0	▼3.0
Majority		69	5.8	▼3.7
Liberal Democrats hold		Swing		
Liberal Democrats hold		Swing		

=== Peel Common ===
Peel Common
Party	Candidate	Votes	%	±%
Conservative	Lynn Hook	883	74.7	▼3.4
Labour	Martyn Davis	299	25.3	▲3.4
Majority		584	49.4	▼6.8
Conservative hold		Swing		

=== Privett ===
Privett
Party	Candidate	Votes	%	±%
Conservative	Sean Blackman	752	63.4	▼7.4
Labour	Annelies James	276	23.3	▼5.9
Green	Russell Thomas	159	13.4	▲13.4
Majority		476	40.1	▼1.5
Conservative hold		Swing		

=== Rowner and Holbrook ===
Rowner and Holbrook
Party	Candidate	Votes	%	±%
Liberal Democrats	Murray Johnston	356	43.7	▲43.7
Conservative	Patrick Bergin	349	42.8	▼6.0
Labour	Tim Ryan	110	13.5	▼8.2
Majority		7	0.9	▼18.4
Liberal Democrats gain from UKIP		Swing		

=== Town ===
Town
Party	Candidate	Votes	%	±%
Labour	June Cully	814	61.4	▲10.6
Conservative	Lesley Meenaghan	511	38.6	▲2.1
Majority		303	22.8	▼8.6
Labour hold		Swing		
