= 2021 Gosport Borough Council election =

2021 UK local government election

- 6 May 2021

17 of 34 seats to Gosport Borough Council 18 seats needed for a majority
| | First party | Second party | Third party |
|---|---|---|---|
| Party | Conservative | Liberal Democrats | Labour |
| Seats before | 18 | 14 | 2 |
| Seats won | 11 | 6 | 0 |
| Seats after | 19 | 14 | 1 |
| Seat change | ▲1 | ▲1 | ▼2 |
| Popular vote | 11,099 | 5,149 | 4,727 |
| Percentage | 50.9% | 23.8% | 21.9% |
| Swing | ▼2.0% | ▲7.5% | ▼2.7% |
- Map showing the results of the 2021 Gosport Borough Council election
Council control before election
Conservative
Council control after election
Conservative

Elections to Gosport Borough Council took place on 6 May 2021 as part of the 2021 United Kingdom local elections. These took place at the same time as the elections for Hampshire County Council and the Hampshire Police and Crime Commissioner.

== Background ==
The previous election, held in 2018, saw the Liberal Democrats gain four seats: two from Conservatives, and one each from the Labour and UKIP. This reduced the Conservative Majority to one, remaining in control of the council, whilst UKIP lost their sole seat, in the Rowner and Holbrook ward.

The Statement of Persons Nominated was published on 9 April 2021.

== Results summary ==
2021 Gosport Borough Council election
| Party | This election | | | | Full council | | | This election | | |
| Party | Candidates | Seats | Net | Seats % | Other | Total | Total % | Votes | Votes % | +/− |
|---|---|---|---|---|---|---|---|---|---|---|
| Conservative | {{{candidates}}} | 11 | ▲1 | 64.7 | 8 | 19 | 55.9 | 11,099 | 50.9 | -2.0 |
| Liberal Democrats | {{{candidates}}} | 6 | ▲1 | 35.3 | 8 | 14 | 41.2 | 5,149 | 23.8 | +7.5 |
| Labour | {{{candidates}}} | 0 | ▼2 | 0.0 | 1 | 1 | 2.9 | 4,727 | 21.9 | -2.7 |
| Green | {{{candidates}}} | 0 | 0 | 0.0 | 0 | 0 | 0.0 | 583 | 2.7 | +0.4 |
| Independent | {{{candidates}}} | 0 | 0 | 0.0 | 0 | 0 | 0.0 | 77 | 0.4 | ±0.0 |
| UKIP | {{{candidates}}} | 0 | 0 | 0.0 | 0 | 0 | 0.0 | 63 | 0.3 | ±0.0 |

== Ward results ==
=== Alverstoke ===
Alverstoke
| Party | Candidate | Votes | % | ±% |
|---|---|---|---|---|
| Conservative | Mark Hook | 861 | 54.5 | −20.8 |
| Liberal Democrats | William Charlton | 581 | 36.8 | N/A |
| Labour | Jonathan Eaton | 137 | 8.7 | −16.0 |
| Majority | | 280 | 17.7 | |
| Turnout | | 1,442 | | |
| Conservative hold | | Swing | | |

=== Anglesey ===
Anglesey
| Party | Candidate | Votes | % | ±% |
|---|---|---|---|---|
| Conservative | Philip Raffaelli | 769 | 56.0 | −18.6 |
| Liberal Democrats | Adele Earle | 351 | 25.5 | N/A |
| Labour | Mark Smith | 128 | 9.3 | −19.4 |
| Green | James Kirkham | 65 | 4.7 | N/A |
| Independent | Dale Fletcher | 61 | 4.4 | N/A |
| Majority | | | | |
| Turnout | | | | |
| Conservative hold | | Swing | | |

=== Bridgemary North ===
Bridgemary North
| Party | Candidate | Votes | % | ±% |
|---|---|---|---|---|
| Liberal Democrats | Steve Hammond | 870 | 68.4 | N/A |
| Conservative | Supriya Namdeo | 326 | 25.6 | −2.4 |
| Labour | Daniel Stratton | 76 | 6.0 | −66.0 |
| Majority | | | | |
| Turnout | | | | |
| Liberal Democrats gain from Labour | | Swing | | |

=== Bridgemary South ===
Bridgemary South
| Party | Candidate | Votes | % | ±% |
|---|---|---|---|---|
| Conservative | Kath Jones | 663 | 52.8 | −0.7 |
| Liberal Democrats | Angela Prickett | 397 | 31.6 | N/A |
| Labour | Charis Noakes | 196 | 15.6 | −30.9 |
| Majority | | | | |
| Turnout | | | | |
| Conservative hold | | Swing | | |

=== Brockhurst ===
Brockhurst
| Party | Candidate | Votes | % | ±% |
|---|---|---|---|---|
| Liberal Democrats | Rob Hylands | 684 | 62.9 | +6.2 |
| Conservative | Pecs Uluiviti | 313 | 28.8 | −1.1 |
| Labour | Alison Mandrill | 90 | 8.3 | −1.2 |
| Majority | | | | |
| Turnout | | | | |
| Liberal Democrats hold | | Swing | | |

=== Christchurch ===
Christchurch
| Party | Candidate | Votes | % | ±% |
|---|---|---|---|---|
| Liberal Democrats | Dawn Kelly | 664 | 48.9 | +1.9 |
| Conservative | Rob Thompson | 443 | 32.6 | −3.7 |
| Labour | Robin Dellow | 153 | 11.3 | −5.4 |
| Green | Robert Johnston | 97 | 7.1 | N/A |
| Majority | | | | |
| Turnout | | | | |
| Liberal Democrats hold | | Swing | | |

=== Elson ===
Elson
| Party | Candidate | Votes | % | ±% |
|---|---|---|---|---|
| Liberal Democrats | Richard Earle | 584 | 51.9 | −2.9 |
| Conservative | Natasha Hook | 396 | 35.3 | +0.6 |
| Labour | Emma Smith | 75 | 6.7 | −3.8 |
| Green | Tabitha Evans | 68 | 6.1 | N/A |
| Majority | | | | |
| Turnout | | | | |
| Liberal Democrats hold | | Swing | | |

=== Forton ===
Forton
| Party | Candidate | Votes | % | ±% |
|---|---|---|---|---|
| Liberal Democrats | Mervin Bradley | 411 | 45.8 | +11.8 |
| Conservative | Gary Walker | 272 | 30.3 | +11.3 |
| Labour | Claire Percival | 112 | 12.5 | −7.0 |
| Independent | Geoff O'Flanagan | 102 | 11.4 | N/A |
| Majority | | | | |
| Turnout | | | | |
| Liberal Democrats hold | | Swing | | |

=== Grange ===
Grange
| Party | Candidate | Votes | % | ±% |
|---|---|---|---|---|
| Conservative | Maggie Morgan | 478 | 56.6 | +16.5 |
| Labour | Jonathan Brown | 208 | 24.6 | +9.0 |
| Liberal Democrats | David Fenton | 159 | 18.8 | −0.5 |
| Majority | | | | |
| Turnout | | | | |
| Conservative hold | | Swing | | |

=== Hardway ===
Hardway
| Party | Candidate | Votes | % | ±% |
|---|---|---|---|---|
| Conservative | Diane Furlong | 633 | 42.9 | −13.1 |
| Liberal Democrats | Lesley Carr | 588 | 39.8 | +12.7 |
| Labour | Lynn Day | 173 | 11.7 | −5.2 |
| Green | Jason Mick | 82 | 5.6 | N/A |
| Majority | | | | |
| Turnout | | | | |
| Conservative hold | | Swing | | |

=== Lee East ===
Lee East
| Party | Candidate | Votes | % | ±% |
|---|---|---|---|---|
| Conservative | Graham Burgess | 1,094 | 62.1 | −9.7 |
| Liberal Democrats | Kirsten Bradley | 549 | 31.2 | N/A |
| Labour | Paul Noakes | 118 | 6.7 | −11.7 |
| Majority | | | | |
| Turnout | | | | |
| Conservative hold | | Swing | | |

=== Lee West ===
Lee West
| Party | Candidate | Votes | % | ±% |
|---|---|---|---|---|
| Conservative | John Beavis | 1,574 | 78.5 | +1.1 |
| Labour | Anne Cruddas | 237 | 11.8 | +0.0 |
| Liberal Democrats | Rachel Melieres-Frost | 193 | 9.6 | N/A |
| Majority | | | | |
| Turnout | | | | |
| Conservative hold | | Swing | | |

=== Leesland ===
Leesland
| Party | Candidate | Votes | % | ±% |
|---|---|---|---|---|
| Liberal Democrats | David Herridge | 451 | 41.0 | −1.5 |
| Conservative | Christopher Best | 348 | 31.7 | −1.3 |
| Labour | Hilary Percival | 224 | 20.4 | +7.9 |
| Green | Sam Pollard | 76 | 6.9 | −5.1 |
| Majority | | | | |
| Turnout | | | | |
| Liberal Democrats hold | | Swing | | |

=== Peel Common ===
Peel Common
| Party | Candidate | Votes | % | ±% |
|---|---|---|---|---|
| Conservative | Stephen Philpott | 800 | 61.3 | −16.8 |
| Liberal Democrats | Tracey Harrowsmith | 504 | 38.7 | N/A |
| Majority | | 296 | 22.6 | |
| Turnout | | 1,304 | | |
| Conservative hold | | Swing | | |

=== Privett ===
Privett
| Party | Candidate | Votes | % | ±% |
|---|---|---|---|---|
| Conservative | Zoe Huggins | 675 | 53.8 | −17.0 |
| Liberal Democrats | Bob Maynard | 303 | 24.1 | N/A |
| Labour | Aretha Green | 277 | 22.1 | −7.1 |
| Majority | | | | |
| Turnout | | | | |
| Conservative hold | | Swing | | |

=== Rowner and Holbrook ===
Rowner and Holbrook
| Party | Candidate | Votes | % | ±% |
|---|---|---|---|---|
| Conservative | Marcus Murphy | 397 | 46.6 | −2.4 |
| Liberal Democrats | Stephen Marshall | 352 | 41.3 | N/A |
| Labour | Hannah Barnard | 103 | 12.1 | −9.6 |
| Majority | | | | |
| Turnout | | | | |
| Conservative hold | | Swing | | |

=== Town ===
Town
| Party | Candidate | Votes | % | ±% |
|---|---|---|---|---|
| Conservative | Lesley Meenaghan | 563 | 42.7 | +6.2 |
| Labour | Christopher Percival | 483 | 36.6 | −14.2 |
| Independent | Berkeley Vincent | 88 | 6.7 | N/A |
| Liberal Democrats | Alison Charlton | 81 | 6.1 | −6.6 |
| Green | Emma Bell | 78 | 5.9 | N/A |
| Reform | Aaron Pinder | 27 | 2.0 | N/A |
| Majority | | | | |
| Turnout | | | | |
| Conservative gain from Labour | | Swing | | |
