= Vadne (ferry) =

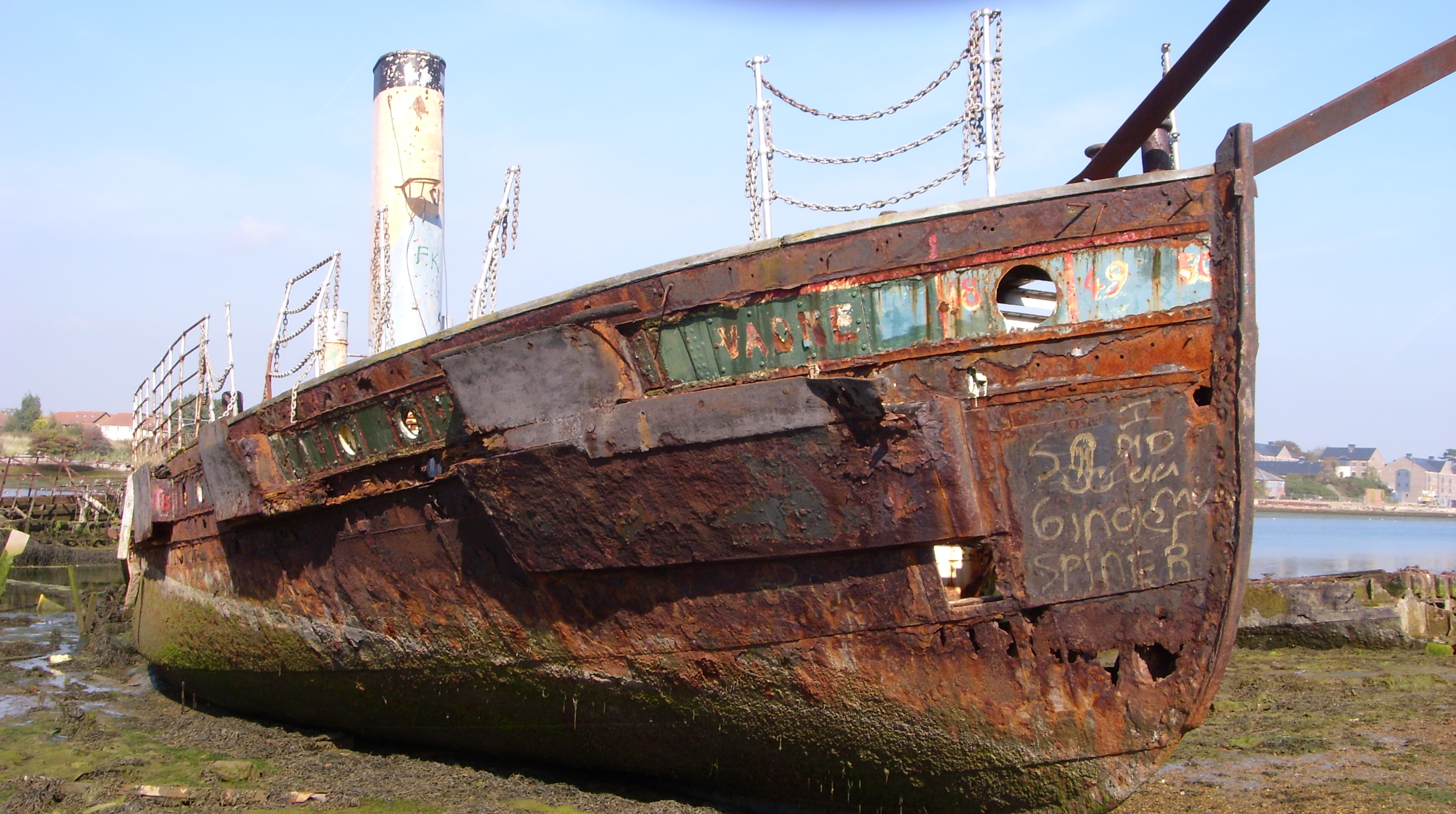
- Vadne on the beach at Forton Lake in 2008

History
- Name: Vadne
- Owner: Port of Portsmouth Steam Launch & Towing Company
- Builder: Vosper & Company, Portsmouth
- Completed: 1939
- In service: 1939–1943, 1946–1965
- Out of service: 1966
- Fate: Beached at Forton Lake, Gosport, 2000

General characteristics
- Type: Ferry
- Tonnage: 75 GRT
- Displacement: 33.84 tons
- Length: 23.32 m (76.5 ft)
- Beam: 5.75 m (18.9 ft)
- Height: 3.32 m (10.9 ft)
- Propulsion: Steam

Vadne was a ferry built by Vosper & Company in 1939 for the Port of Portsmouth Steam Launch & Towing Company. In service until 1966, her remains are at Forton Lake, Gosport.

== History ==
Vadne was built at Portsmouth in 1939 to serve the people of Gosport and Portsmouth, carrying passengers across Portsmouth Harbour, but within days of the outbreak of the Second World War she was requisitioned for the Royal Navy's examination service. In January 1943 she was shipped to Sierra Leone for harbour service.

Returned to the ferry company in 1946, Vadne plied Portsmouth Harbour until 1965, when an attempt to increase her internal capacity by removing a bulkhead severely weakened her structural integrity and she was taken out of service.

On the night of 12 July 1957, a collision between Vadne and the Black Swan-class sloop HMS Redpole resulted in the death of one of the 40 passengers. (Note: The 65-year-old male passenger who was injured in the accident subsequently died in hospital from the head injuries sustained) The ferry was holed, but salved and later repaired. This was the first collision and first fatal accident in the 74-year history of the Portsmouth Steam Launch and Towing Company.

Between 1966 and 1981, Vadne served as the clubhouse of the Gosport Cruising Club, before sinking at her moorings near Weevil Lane, in Gosport. A restoration project took place from 1981, but Vadne sank once more in 1983, and at this point was taken to the Maritime Workshop, by Forton Lake.

Although Vadne's stay at the Maritime Workshop was initially intended only to be short-term, she remained berthed there for seventeen years until, in 2000, the decision was taken to beach her several hundred metres along the shore at Forton Lake. Her remains have since been victim to vandalism and natural decay.

in 2015 a Facebook group, The Vadne Funnel Recovery and Restoration Group, was formed, with a view to restoring the funnel, which had detached from the superstructure and lay in the mud adjacent to the hulk. Their aim was to restore the funnel and display it for the benefit of tourists and the local population; however, as with the earlier restoration project, nothing came of these efforts.
