= 2010 Gosport Borough Council election =

2010 UK local government election

2010 Gosport Borough Council Election
← 2008	6 May 2010	2012 →

17 of 35 seats to Gosport Borough Council 18 seats needed for a majority
	First party	Second party	Third party
Party	Conservative	Liberal Democrats	Labour
Seats before	16	14	4
Seats won	12	3	2
Popular vote	18,213	9,768	7,648
Percentage	47.8%	25.6%	20.1%
Council control before election
No Overall Control
Council control after election
Conservative

Elections to Gosport Council in Hampshire, England were held on 6 May 2010. Half of the council was up for election and the council stayed under no overall control. The Conservatives made six gains, including in some wards that they had lost in the previous election, despite having a reduced vote share. The Liberal Democrats and Labour Party lost 5 and 1 seats respectively, with Labour seeing a large increase of the total vote share.

After the election, the composition of the council was:

- Conservative: 22
- Liberal Democrat: 9
- Labour: 3

== Election result ==
Gosport local election result 2010
Party	Seats	Gains	Losses	Net gain/loss	Seats %	Votes %	Votes	+/−
Conservative	12	6	0	▲6		47.8	18,213	
Liberal Democrats	3	0	5	▼5		25.6	9,768	
Labour	2	0	1	▼1		20.1	7,648	
UKIP	0	0	0	Steady		2.2	854	
English Democrat	0	0	0	Steady		1.6	619	
Independent	0	0	0	Steady		1.4	528	
Green	0	0	0	Steady		1.2	452	

== Ward results ==
=== Alverstoke ===
Alverstoke
Party	Candidate	Votes	%	±%
Conservative	Peter Edgar	1,576	63.5	−5.0
Liberal Democrats	Dawn Kelly	370	14.9	+2.9
Labour	Graham Hewitt	339	9.9	+6.1
UKIP	Judith Smith	136	5.5	−4.4
Green	Linda Maclennan	60	7.6	+7.6
Majority		1206		
Turnout				
Conservative hold		Swing		

=== Anglesey ===
Anglesey
Party	Candidate	Votes	%	±%
Conservative	Alan Scard	1,254	56.8	+7.7
Liberal Democrats	Austin Hicks	764	34.6	−11.3
Labour	Michael Madgwick	189	8.6	+3.6
Majority		490		
Turnout				
Conservative gain from Liberal Democrats		Swing		

=== Bridgemary North ===
Bridgemary North
Party	Candidate	Votes	%	±%
Labour	Dennis Wright	1002	47.4	
Conservative	John Whyte	733	34.6	
English Democrat	Tony Rowan	381	18.0	
Majority		269		
Turnout				
Conservative hold		Swing		

=== Bridgemary South ===
Bridgemary South
Party	Candidate	Votes	%	±%
Conservative	Christopher Carter	1154	57.6	
Labour	Alan Durrant	848	42.4	
Majority		306		
Turnout				
Conservative gain from Labour		Swing		

=== Brockhurst ===
Brockhurst
Party	Candidate	Votes	%	±%
Conservative	Justin Henshaw	918	41.9	
Liberal Democrats	Sharon Mude	850	38.8	
Labour	Michael O'Gorman	331	15.1	
Green	Jane Staffieri	92	4.2	
Majority		68		
Turnout				
Conservative gain from Liberal Democrats		Swing		

=== Christchurch ===
Christchurch
Party	Candidate	Votes	%	±%
Conservative	Wayne Ronayne	862	40.2	−2.5
Liberal Democrats	George Morby	777	36.3	−5.3
Labour	John Hustler	312	14.6	+9.4
UKIP	Catherine Andrews	191	8.9	+3.1
Majority		85		
Turnout				
Conservative gain from Liberal Democrats		Swing		

=== Elson ===
Elson
Party	Candidate	Votes	%	±%
Liberal Democrats	Susan Ballard	1,049	45.5	−0.8
Conservative	Stephen Green	907	39.3	−1.3
Labour	Paul Noakes	205	8.9	+4.0
UKIP	John Bridgewater	143	6.2	−2.0
Majority		142		
Turnout				
Liberal Democrats hold		Swing		

=== Forton ===
Forton
Party	Candidate	Votes	%	±%
Liberal Democrats	Clive Foster-Reed	789	39.9	−1.1
Conservative	Peter Greenwood	610	30.8	−5.4
Labour	Keith Farr	580	29.3	+6.4
Majority		179		
Turnout				
Liberal Democrats hold		Swing		

=== Grange ===
Grange
Party	Candidate	Votes	%	±%
Conservative	Tony Jessop	641	42.8	−11.7
Liberal Democrats	Julie Woods	594	39.6	+6.8
Labour	James Fox	204	13.6	+3.6
Green	Fiona Maclennan	60	4.0	+0.2
Majority		47		
Turnout				
Conservative hold		Swing		

=== Hardway ===
Hardway
Party	Candidate	Votes	%	±%
Conservative	Roger Allen	1184	44.7	−7.4
Liberal Democrats	Cyril Simpson	799	30.2	+30.2
Labour	Stephen Williams	278	10.5	−1.5
Green	Claire Smith	240	9.1	−22.00
UKIP	Darren Fells	145	5.5	+0.7
Majority		385		
Turnout				
Conservative hold		Swing		

=== Lee East ===
Lee East
Party	Candidate	Votes	%	±%
Conservative	Derek Kimber	1,853	71.7	−10.6
Liberal Democrats	Paul Keeley	766	25.3	+1.7
Labour	Peter Bell	412	4.7	+8.9
Majority		1087		
Turnout				
Conservative hold		Swing		

=== Lee West ===
Lee West
Party	Candidate	Votes	%	±%
Conservative	Christopher Cater	1,849	64.9	−24.8
Liberal Democrats	James Bailey	698	24.5	+24.5
Labour	Jill Whitcher	302	10.6	+0.6
Majority		1151		
Turnout				
Conservative hold		Swing		

=== Leesland ===
Leesland
Party	Candidate	Votes	%	±%
Liberal Democrats	Peter Chegwyn	1016	48.2	−0.3
Conservative	George McAleese	872	41.1	−3.2
Labour	Charis Noakes	233	11.0	+3.5
Majority		144		
Turnout				
Liberal Democrats hold		Swing		

=== Peel Common ===
Peel Common
Party	Candidate	Votes	%	±%
Conservative	Lynn Hook	1,304	58.7	−9.4
Labour	Paule Ripley	483	21.7	0
Independent	John Bowles (Note: Stood in previous election as Liberal Democrat Candidate. -2.1 swing from previous)	435	10.1	'"`UNIQ−−ref−0000004E−QINU`"'
Majority		821		
Turnout				
Conservative hold		Swing		

=== Privett ===
Privett
Party	Candidate	Votes	%	±%
Conservative	Colin Jacobs	1062	45.6	−0.2
Liberal Democrats	Keith Gill	971	41.7	−7.9
Labour	Joan Bateman	297	12.7	+8.1
Majority		91		
Turnout				
Conservative gain from Liberal Democrats		Swing		

=== Rowner and Holbrook ===
Rowner and Holbrook
Party	Candidate	Votes	%	±%
Conservative	Michael Lane	753	44.1	+4.6
Labour	John Train	543	31.8	+10.9
English Democrat	Bob Shaw	174	10.2	−4.8
UKIP	Jacob Campbell	144	8.4	+8.4
Independent	Jim McGookin	93	5.4	+5.4
Majority		210		
Turnout				
Conservative gain from Liberal Democrats		Swing		

=== Town ===
Town
Party	Candidate	Votes	%	±%
Labour	June Cully	1090	38.0	+10.3
Conservative	Brian Taylor	682	30.2	−2.7
Liberal Democrats	John Simpson	325	14.4	−4.1
UKIP	Chris Harris	95	4.2	−3.1
English Democrat	Fungus Adams	64	2.8	+2.8
Majority		408		
Turnout				
Labour hold		Swing		
