= 1999 Gosport Borough Council election =

Gosport Borough Council elections

Elections to Gosport Borough Council were held on 6 May 1999. One third of the council was up for election and the council stayed under no overall control.

After the election, the composition of the council was

- Labour 11
- Conservative 10
- Liberal Democrat 7
- Others 2

== Election result ==
Gosport local election result 1999
| Party | Seats | Gains | Losses | Net gain/loss | Seats % | Votes % | Votes | +/− |
|---|---|---|---|---|---|---|---|---|
| Liberal Democrats | 5 | | | +4 | 45.5 | | | |
| Labour | 3 | | | +1 | 27.3 | | | |
| Conservative | 3 | | | +1 | 27.3 | | | |
| Others | 0 | | | -6 | 0 | | | |
