= Gosport Borough Council =

Non-metropolitan district council in Hampshire, England

Type
- Type: Non-metropolitan district

Leadership
- Mayor: Kirsten Bradley, Independent since 14 May 2025
- Leader: Zoe Huggins, Conservative since 20 May 2026
- Chief Executive: Debbie Gore since 2023

Structure
- Seats: 28 councillors
- Political groups: Administration (11) Conservative (11) Other parties (17) Reform (10) Liberal Democrats (6) Independent (1)
- Length of term: 4 years

Elections
- Last election: 7 May 2026

Meeting place
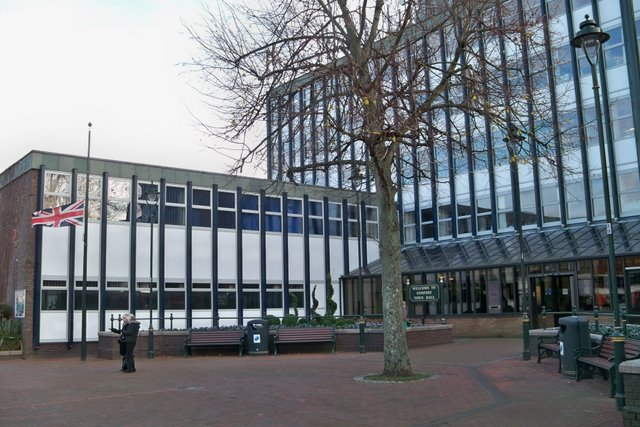
- Town Hall, High Street, Gosport, PO12 1EB

Website
- www.gosport.gov.uk

Gosport Borough Council is the local authority for the borough of Gosport, in the county of Hampshire, England.

The council has been under no overall control since January 2026. Since the May 2026 election, the council has been led by a Conservative Party minority administration. The council is based at Gosport Town Hall.

== History ==
Gosport was historically part of the parish of Alverstoke. Gosport's first form of local government was a body of improvement commissioners known as the "Gosport Town Trustees", established in 1763. In 1874 the town trustees were replaced by a Local Board (also known as the Urban Sanitary Authority) and the local government district was enlarged to cover the whole parish of Alverstoke, and so the new body was called the "Alverstoke Local Board". The loss of the Gosport name from its governing body was a subject of ongoing debate in the area for some years afterwards, and in 1891 the local board was renamed the "Gosport and Alverstoke Local Board".

Under the Local Government Act 1894, such local government districts were reconstituted as urban districts, and so the council became the "Gosport and Alverstoke Urban District Council". On 9 November 1922 the urban district was made a municipal borough and the Alverstoke name was removed from its title. On 1 April 1974 the district became a non-metropolitan district, altering its powers and responsibilities but keeping the same area and name.

In March 2026, the government announced that it would abolish the borough in 2028 as part of local government reform across Hampshire. These proposals were withdrawn in September 2026.

== Governance ==
Gosport Borough Council provides district-level services. County-level services are provided by Hampshire County Council. There are no civil parishes in the borough.

=== Political control ===
The council has been under no overall control since January 2026. After the 2026 election, the Conservatives became the largest party and formed a minority administration to run the council.

Political control of the council since the 1974 reforms has been as follows:

Party in control	Years
Labour	1974–1976
Conservative	1976–1990
No overall control	1990–1991
Liberal Democrats	1991–1997
No overall control	1997–2004
Conservative	2004–2006
No overall control	2006–2010
Conservative	2010–2022
Liberal Democrats	2022–2026
No overall control	2026–present

=== Leadership ===
The role of mayor is largely ceremonial in Gosport. Political leadership is instead provided by the leader of the council (formally the chair of the policy and organisation board). The leaders since 2007 have been:

Councillor	Party	From	To
Shaun Cully	Labour	pre-2007	May 2008
David Smith	Liberal Democrats	15 May 2008	May 2009
Mark Hook	Conservative	14 May 2009	19 May 2021
Graham Burgess	Conservative	19 May 2021	May 2022
Peter Chegwyn	Liberal Democrats	19 May 2022	May 2026
Zoe Huggins	Conservative	20 May 2026	

=== Composition ===
Following the 2026 election, the composition of the council was:

Party	Councillors
Conservative	11
Reform	10
Liberal Democrats	6
Independent	1
Total	28

== Elections ==
Since the last boundary changes in 2022 the council has comprised 28 councillors elected from 14 wards, with each ward electing two councillors. Elections are held in alternate years with half the council being elected each time (one councillor for each ward) for a four year term of office.

== Premises ==
The council is based at Gosport Town Hall on the High Street. The building was purpose-built for the council and was completed in 1964. The previous town hall of 1812 had been destroyed in the Portsmouth Blitz in 1940.
