= QF 12-pounder 12 cwt naval gun =

British 3 inch calibre naval gun

QF 12-pounder 12 cwt naval gun Type 41 3-inch (7.62 cm) 40 calibre gun
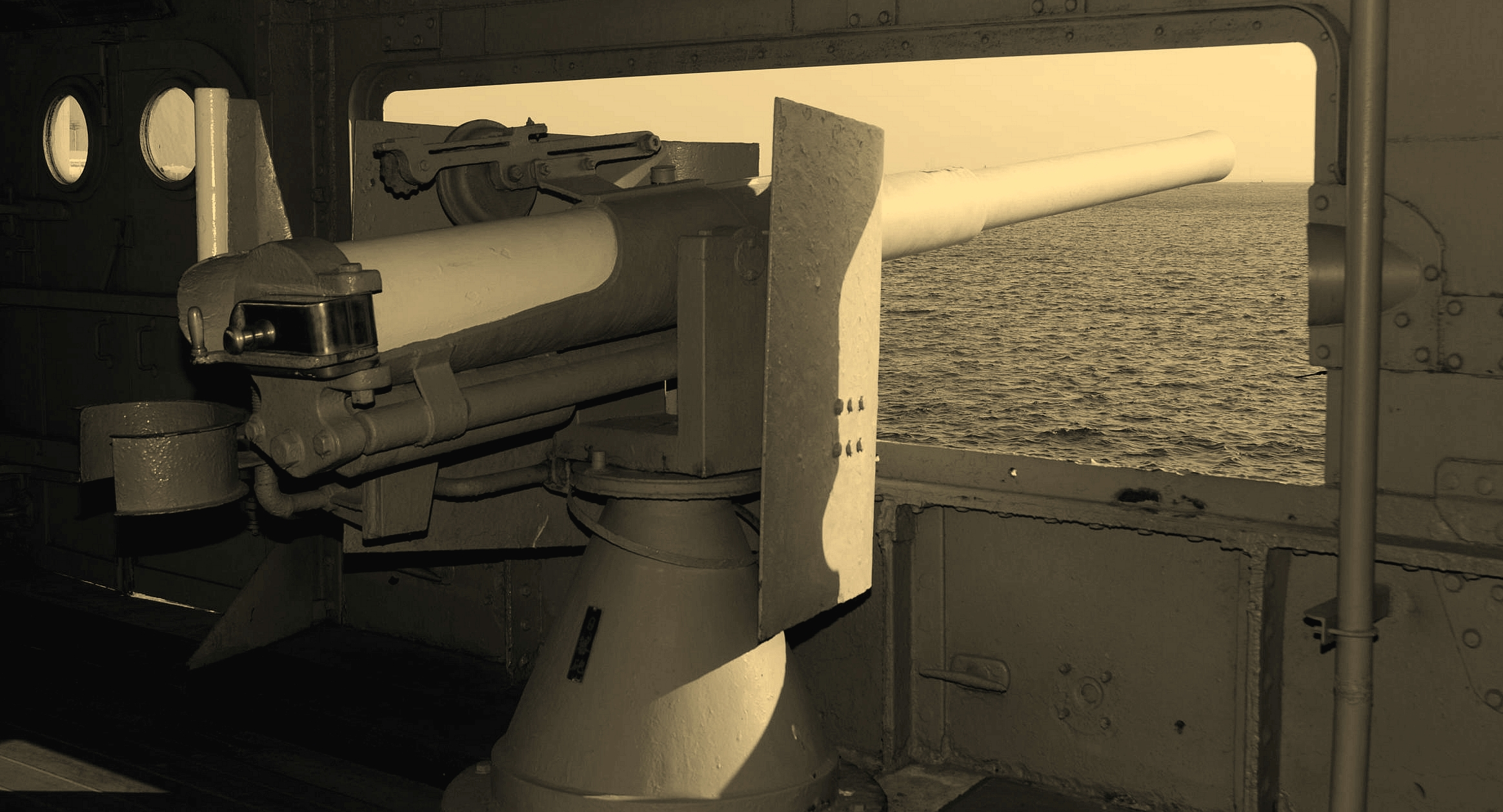
- Type 41 3-inch (7.62 cm) 40 calibre gun on the Japanese battleship Mikasa
- Type: Naval gun Coastal artillery
- Place of origin: United Kingdom

Service history
- In service: 1894–1945
- Used by: United Kingdom; Kingdom of Italy; Empire of Japan
- Wars: Second Boer War; British colonial conflicts; Irish 1916 Easter Rising; Boxer Rebellion; Russo-Japanese War; World War I; World War II

Production history
- Designed: 1893
- Manufacturer: Elswick Ordnance Company, Vickers, Japan Steel Works; Canadian Pacific Railway; Gio. Ansaldo & C.
- No. built: Mk I, Mk II 4,737; Mk V 3,494
- Variants: Mk I, Mk II, Mk V

Specifications
- Mass: 12 cwt (0.6 tons, 510 kg)
- Length: 10 ft 3 in (3.12 m)
- Barrel length: 10 ft (3 m)
- Shell: UK & Japan: Separate-loading QF; Italy: Fixed QF
- Calibre: 3-inch (7.62 cm)
- Breech: single-motion screw
- Elevation: mounting dependent
- Traverse: mounting dependent
- Rate of fire: 15 rounds per minute
- Muzzle velocity: 2,210 ft/s (670 m/s) (Note: 2,210 ft/s in British service in 1902, using 1 lb 15 oz (0.88 kg) cordite Mk I size 15 propellant; 2,258 ft/s (688 m/s) in British service in World War I using 2 lb (0.91 kg) cordite MD size 11 propellant)
- Effective firing range: 11,750 yd (10,740 m) at 40° elevation
- Feed system: Breech-loaded

The QF 12-pounder 12-cwt gun (Quick-Firing) (abbreviated as Q.F. 12-pdr. [12-cwt.]) was a common, versatile 3-inch (76.2 mm) calibre naval gun introduced in 1894 and used until the middle of the 20th century. It was produced by Armstrong Whitworth, Elswick and used on Royal Navy warships, exported to allied countries, and used for land service. In British service "12-pounder" was the rounded value of the projectile weight, and "12 cwt (hundredweight)" was the weight of the barrel and breech, to differentiate it from other "12-pounder" guns.

As the Type 41 3-inch (7.62 cm)/40 it was used on most early battleships and cruisers of the Imperial Japanese Navy, though it was commonly referred to by its UK designation as a "12-pounder" gun. Italy built guns under licence as the 76.2 mm/40 (3") by Ansaldo.

== United Kingdom service ==
=== United Kingdom naval service ===
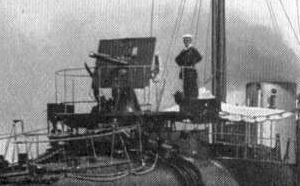
As first mounted on 27-knot destroyers from 1894, here seen on HMS Daring

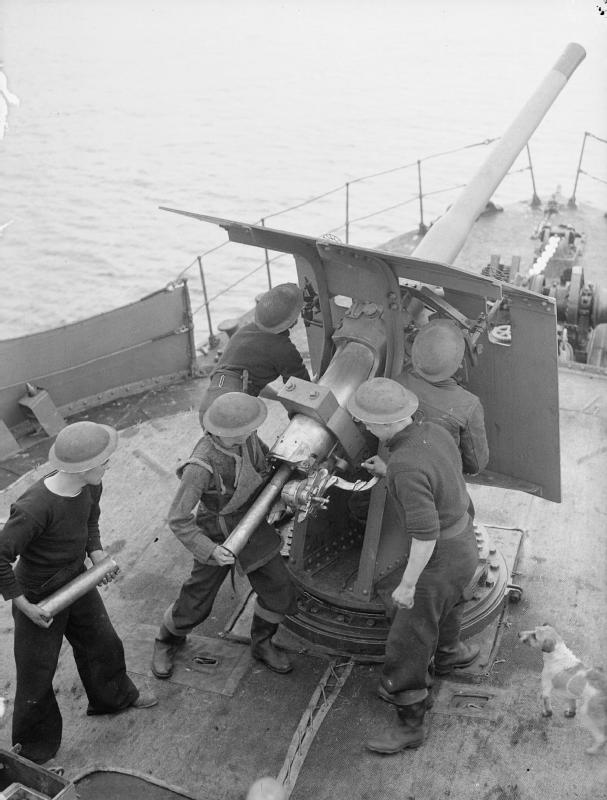
Mk V gun on a British trawler, World War II

Mk I and II guns, of "built up" construction of steel layers, served on many Royal Navy destroyers up to and after World War I originally as primary and later as secondary armament against submarines and torpedo boats. They were also fitted as deck guns on D and E-class submarines.

It was estimated that out of the 4,737 Mk I and Mk II guns produced there were still 3,494 on hand for the RN in 1939. Many Mk V guns, which had a "monobloc" barrel made of a single casting, served on smaller escort ships such as destroyers and on armed merchant ships, on dual-purpose high–low angle mountings which also allowed it to be used as an anti-aircraft gun.

== Gun mounting data ==
Mounting	Elevation	Weight including gun
PI*	-10° to +30°	1.23 tons / 1,253 kg
HA VIII	-10° to +90°	2.10 tons / 2,134 kg
HA/LA IX	-10° to +70°	2.45 tons / 2,489 kg

=== South African War (1899–1902) land service ===
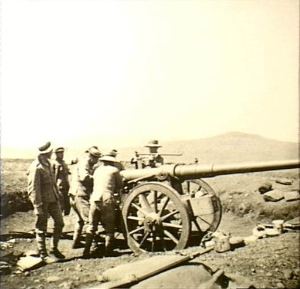
Naval brigade with a "long twelve" in Natal

The gun was primarily a high-velocity naval gun, with its heavy recoil suiting it to static mountings, hence it was generally considered unsuitable for use as a mobile field gun. An exception was made when the British army were outgunned by the Boer artillery in South Africa and the Royal Navy was called on for help. Among other guns, 16 QF 12-pounder 12 cwt were landed from warships and were mounted on improvised field carriages designed by Captain Percy Scott RN, with solid wooden trails and utilizing small-diameter Cape wagon wheels. Their 10,000-yard (9,100 m) range provided valuable long-range fire support for the army throughout the war. They were known as "long twelves" to distinguish them from the BL 12-pounder 6 cwt and QF 12-pounder 8 cwt which had much shorter barrels and ranges.

Lieutenant Burne reported that the original electric firing system, while working well under ideal conditions, required support of an armourer and the maintenance and transport of charged batteries in the field, which was generally not possible. He reported switching to percussion tubes for firing and recommended percussion for future field operations.

Another six guns were diverted from a Japanese battleship being built at Newcastle in January 1900, bought by Lady Meux, and were equipped with proper field carriages by the Elswick Ordnance Company in Newcastle and sent to South Africa. Perhaps uniquely, the guns were refused by the War Office and donated directly to Lord Roberts, the British commander in South Africa and became his personal property. They were known as the "Elswick Battery" and were manned by men from Elswick, recruited by 1st Northumberland Royal Garrison Artillery (Volunteers). The Elswick guns served throughout the war.

=== Coast defense gun ===
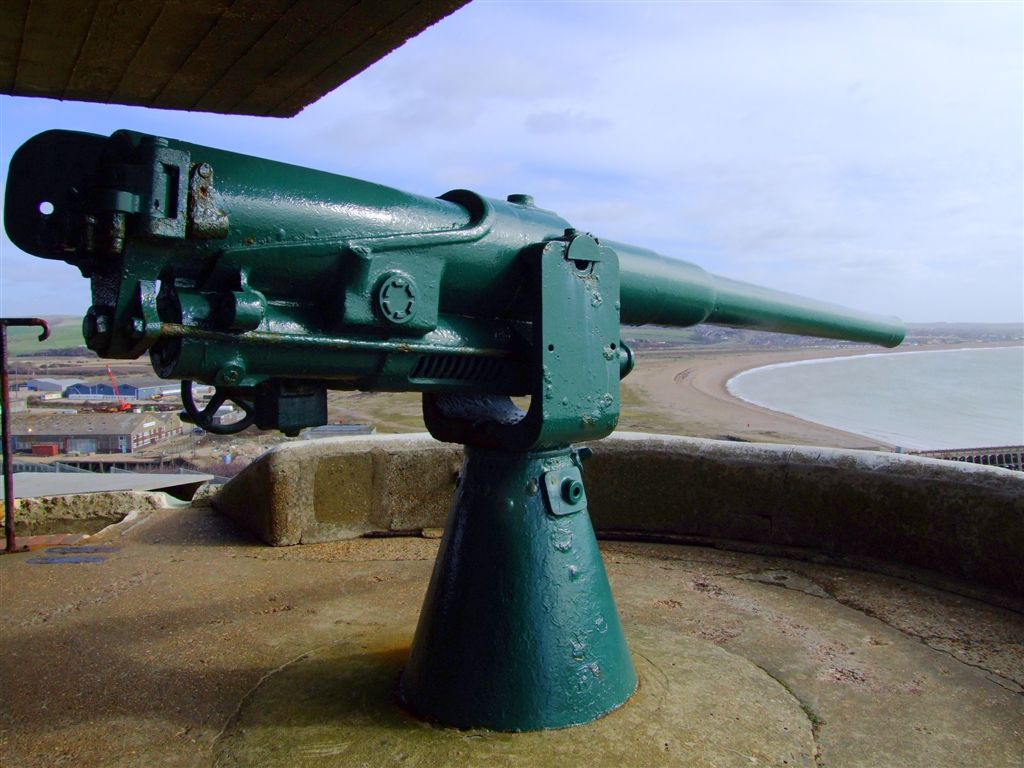
Typical coast defense mounting, at Newhaven Fort, UK

Many guns were mounted on "pedestals" secured to the ground to defend harbours around the UK, and at many ports around the Empire, against possible attack by small fast vessels such as torpedo boats, until the 1950s. There were 103 of these guns (of a total 383 of all types) employed in coast defense around the UK as at April 1918. Many of these were still in service in World War II although they had by then been superseded by more modern types such as twin QF 6-pounder 10 cwt mounts.

Guns were traversed (moved from side to side) manually by the gunlayer as he stood on the left side with his arm hooked over a shoulder piece as he aimed, while he operated the elevating handwheel with his left hand and grasped the pistol grip with trigger in his right hand.

=== Army anti-aircraft gun ===
In World War I a number of coast defense guns were modified and mounted on special wheeled traveling carriages to create a marginally effective mobile anti-aircraft gun.

=== United Kingdom ammunition ===
UK shells weighed 12.5 lb (5.67 kg) filled and fuzed.
The cordite propellant charge was normally ignited by an electrically activated primer (in the base of the cartridge case), with power provided by a battery. The electric primer in the cartridge could be replaced by an adaptor which allowed the use of electric or percussion tube to be inserted to provide ignition.

2 lb Cordite cartridges Mk II & Mk III, 1914	Mk II common pointed shell	Mk III & Mk II common Lyddite shell	Mk IV common Lyddite shell with internal night tracer, 1914	Mk IX shrapnel shell, 1914

== Italian service ==
The Italian Cannon 76/40 Model 1916 was a licensed derivative of the QF 12-pounder used in a number of roles during World War I and World War II.

== Japanese service ==
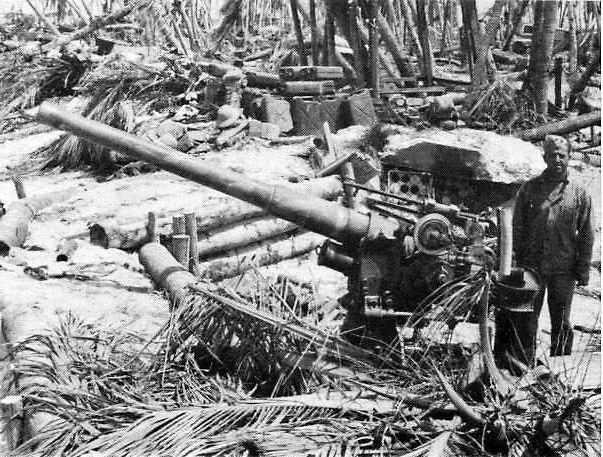
A captured Type 41 8 cm naval gun.

The Japanese Type 41 3-inch (76 mm) naval gun was a direct copy of the QF 12-pounder. The first guns were bought from the English firms as "Elswick Pattern N" and "Vickers Mark Z" guns. The gun was officially designated as the Type 41 3-inch (76 mm) naval gun from the 41st year of the reign of Emperor Meiji on 25 December 1908. Thereafter production was in Japan under license. On 5 October 1917 during the third year of the Taishō period, the gun was redesignated as the 8 cm/40 3rd Year Type naval gun as part of the Imperial Japanese Navy's conversion to the metric system. Although classified as an 8 cm gun the bore was unchanged. The gun fired a 12.5-pound (5.7 kg) high-explosive shell. It was the standard secondary or tertiary armament on most Japanese warships built between 1890 and 1920, and was still in service as late as the Pacific War.

The 8 cm/40 3rd Year Type was also widely used as a coastal defense gun and anti-aircraft gun to defend Japanese island bases during World War II. Guns with both English and Japanese markings were found on Kiska, Kolombangara, Saipan, Tarawa, and Tinian. Japanese Artillery Weapons CINPAC-CINPOA Bulletin 152-45 calls the guns "8 cm Coast Defense Gun 13th Year Type (1924)".

== Surviving guns ==
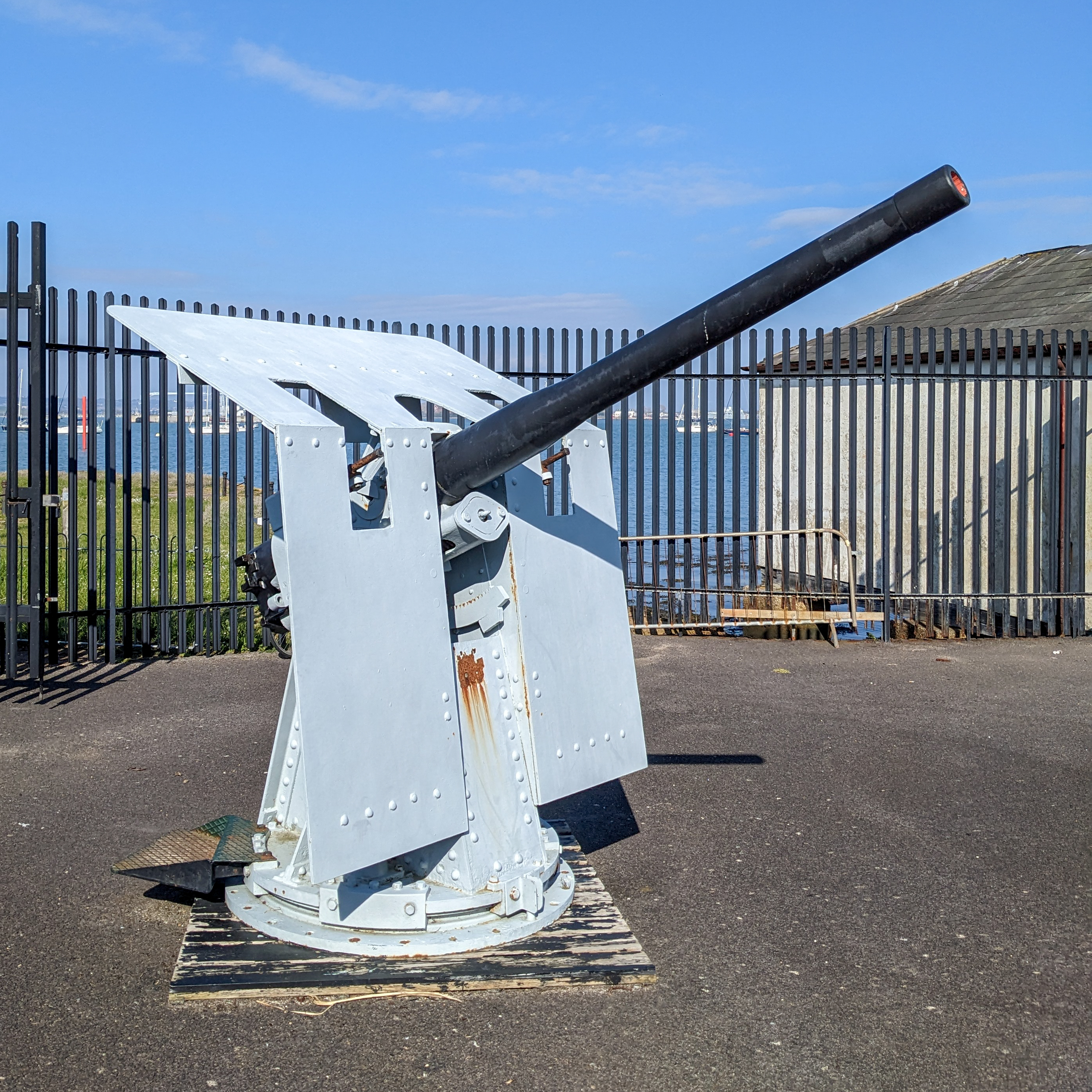
Gun at Explosion Museum of Naval Firepower

- A gun of the Elswick Battery that served in the Second Boer War is displayed in the Royal Artillery Museum, London but the museum has closed and re-located to Larkhill, Wiltshire.
- Another Elswick gun is with 203 (Elswick) Battery RA (V)
- Mk V naval gun was at Royal Artillery Museum, London but the museum has closed and re-located to Larkhill, Wiltshire.
- Early coast defence gun at Newhaven Fort, UK
- Coast defence gun at Army Memorial Museum, Waiouru, New Zealand
- On the battleship Mikasa, Yokosuka, Japan
- The gun of HMS Campbeltown, recovered around 1972, on display in Saint-Nazaire, France
- 12-pdr on coastal defence pedestal at Pendennis Castle, Falmouth, Cornwall
- The gun of HMS Overdale Wyke of the Ceylon Naval Volunteer Force, now kept in SLNS Ranagalle
- A good example can be seen mounted at Tilbury Fort in Essex. This is an ex-naval type of WW2 vintage.
- A 12-pdr of First World War vintage is mounted on a skeletal high-angle mount at Predannack Anti-Aircraft battery and museum in Cornwall
- At Explosion Museum of Naval Firepower, Gosport, UK

== Gallery ==
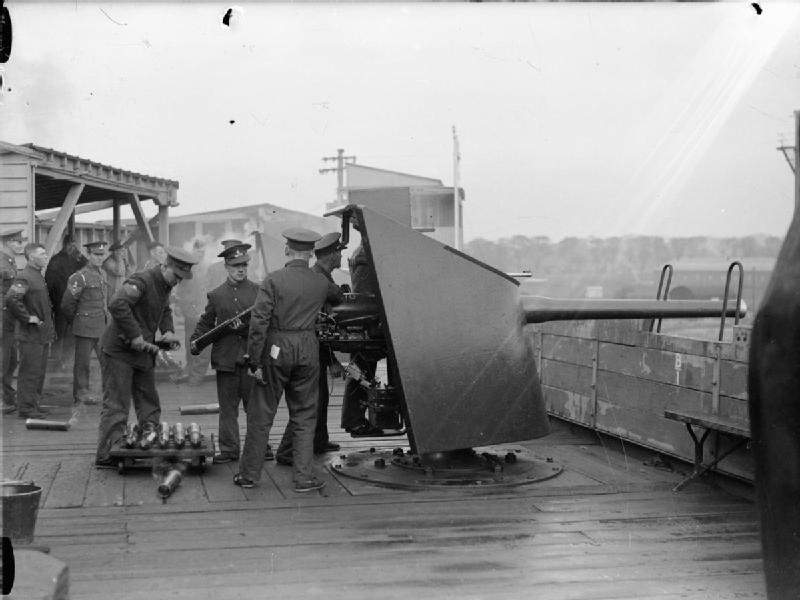

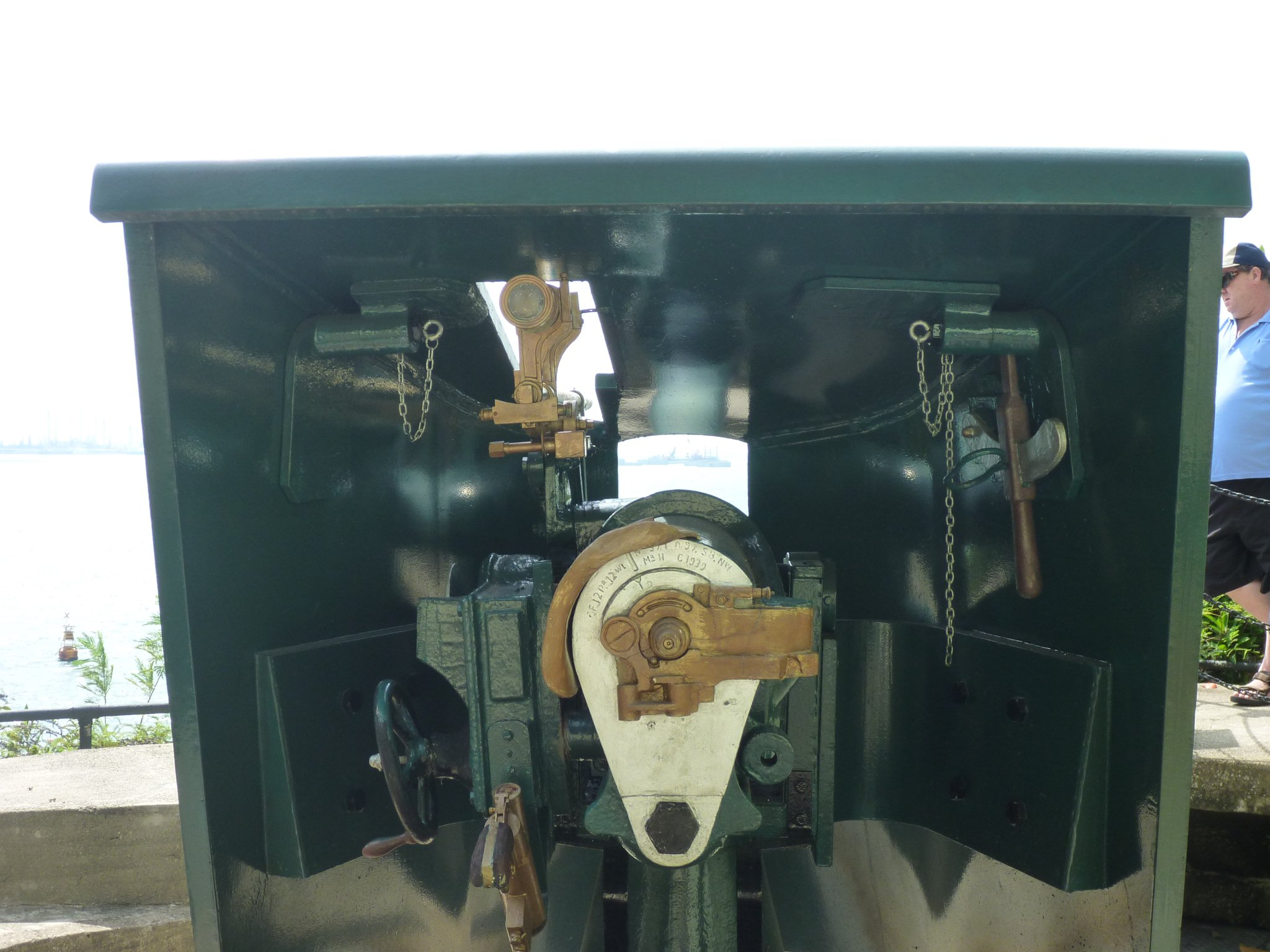

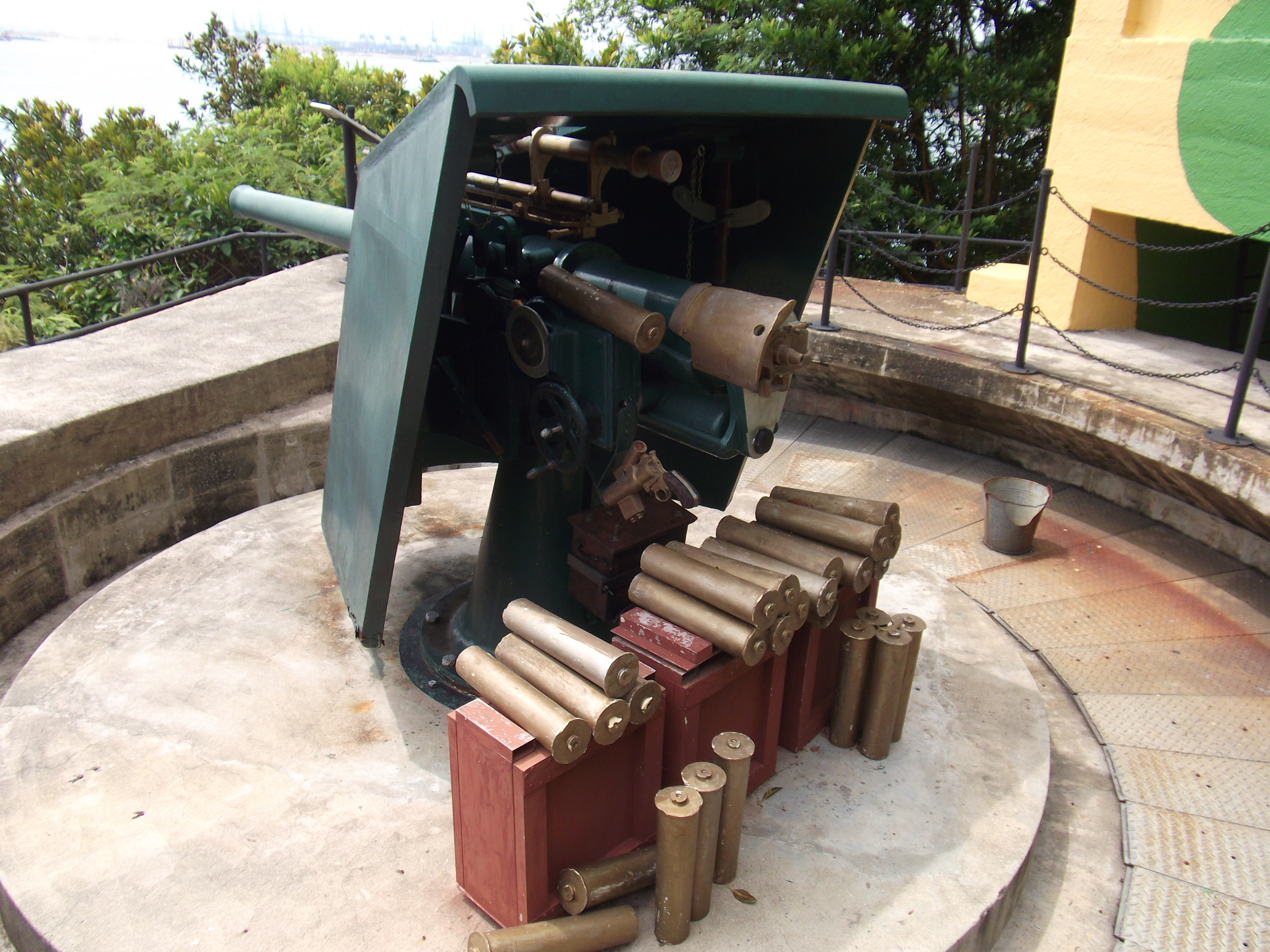

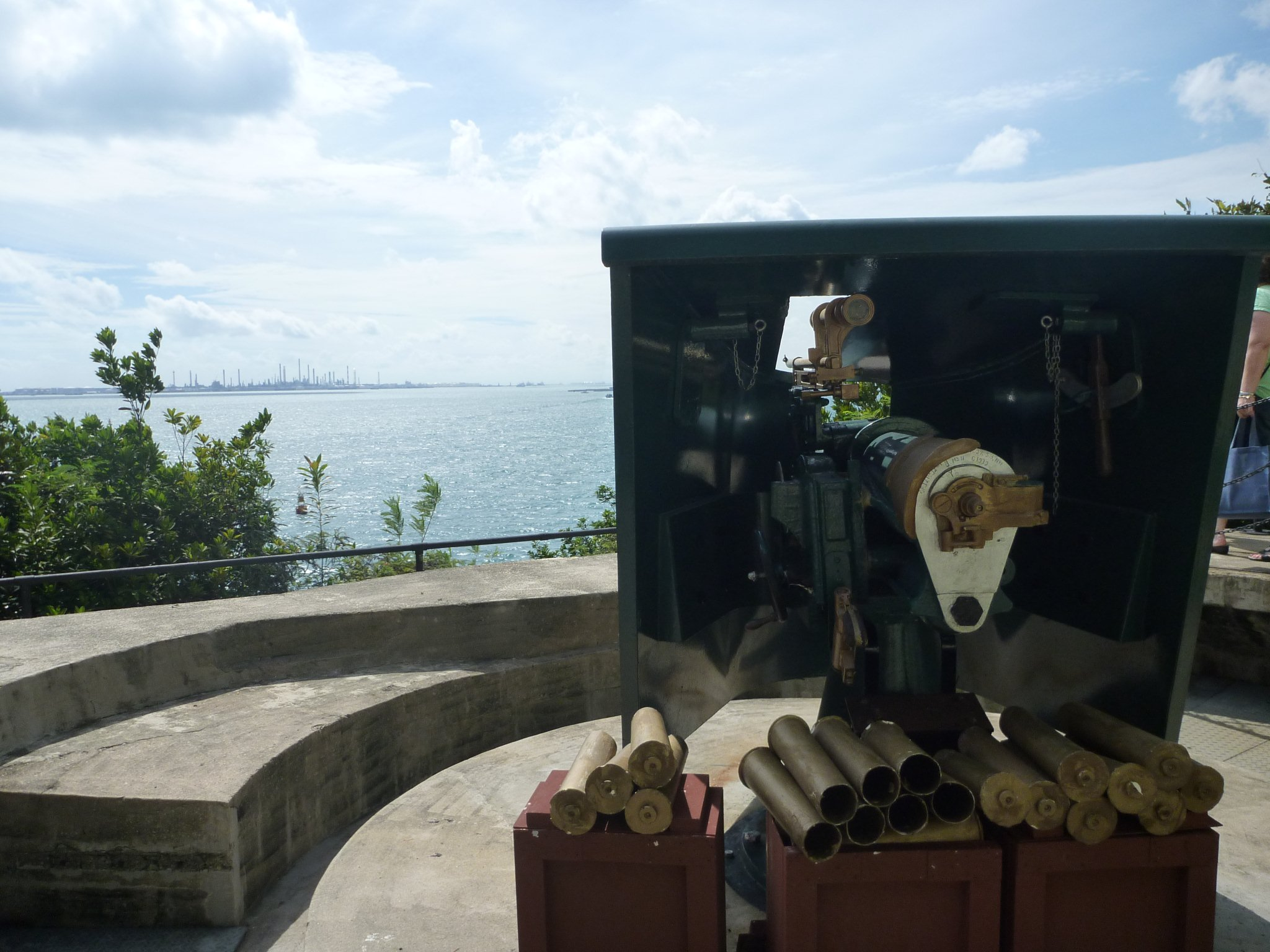

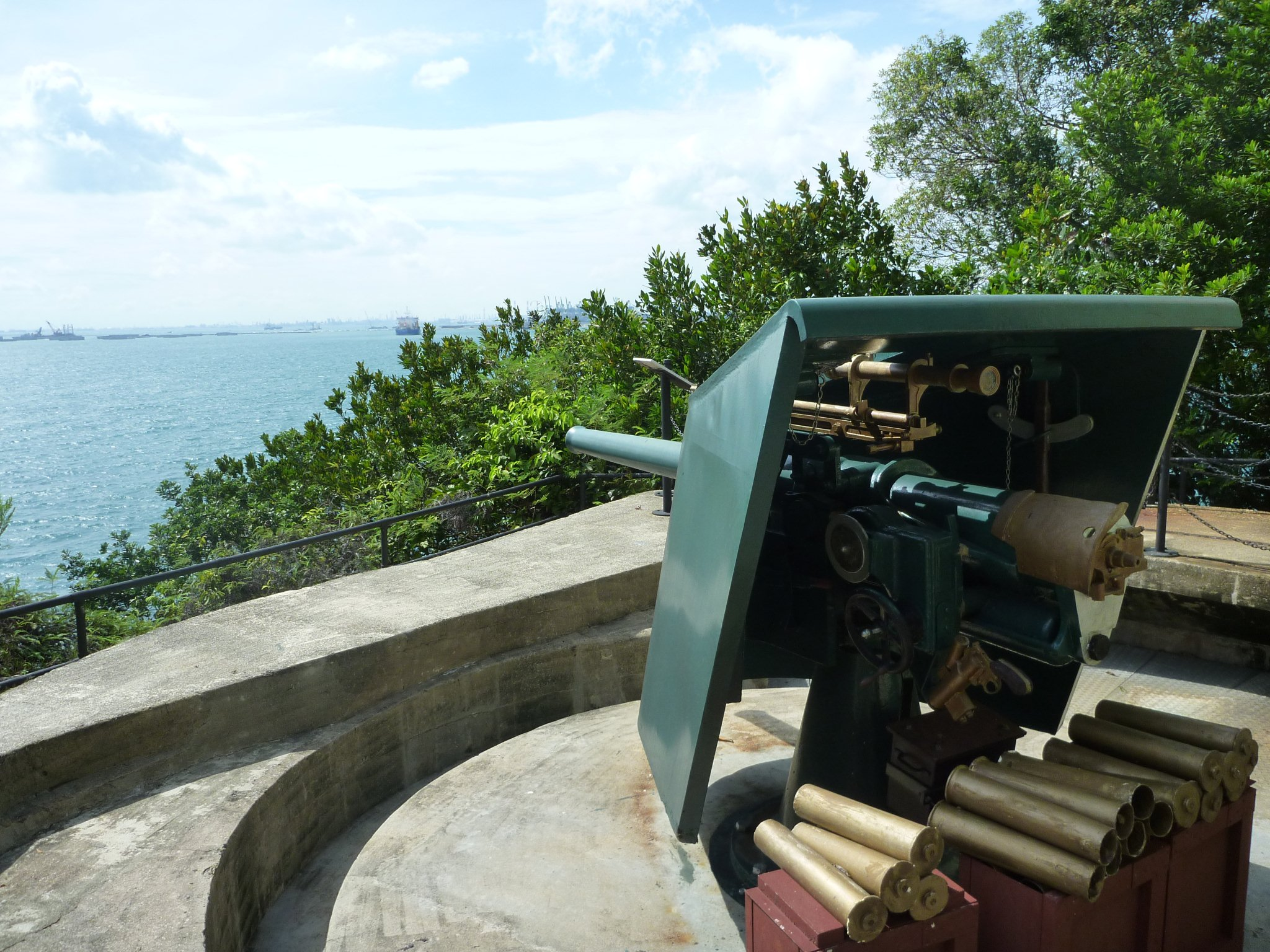

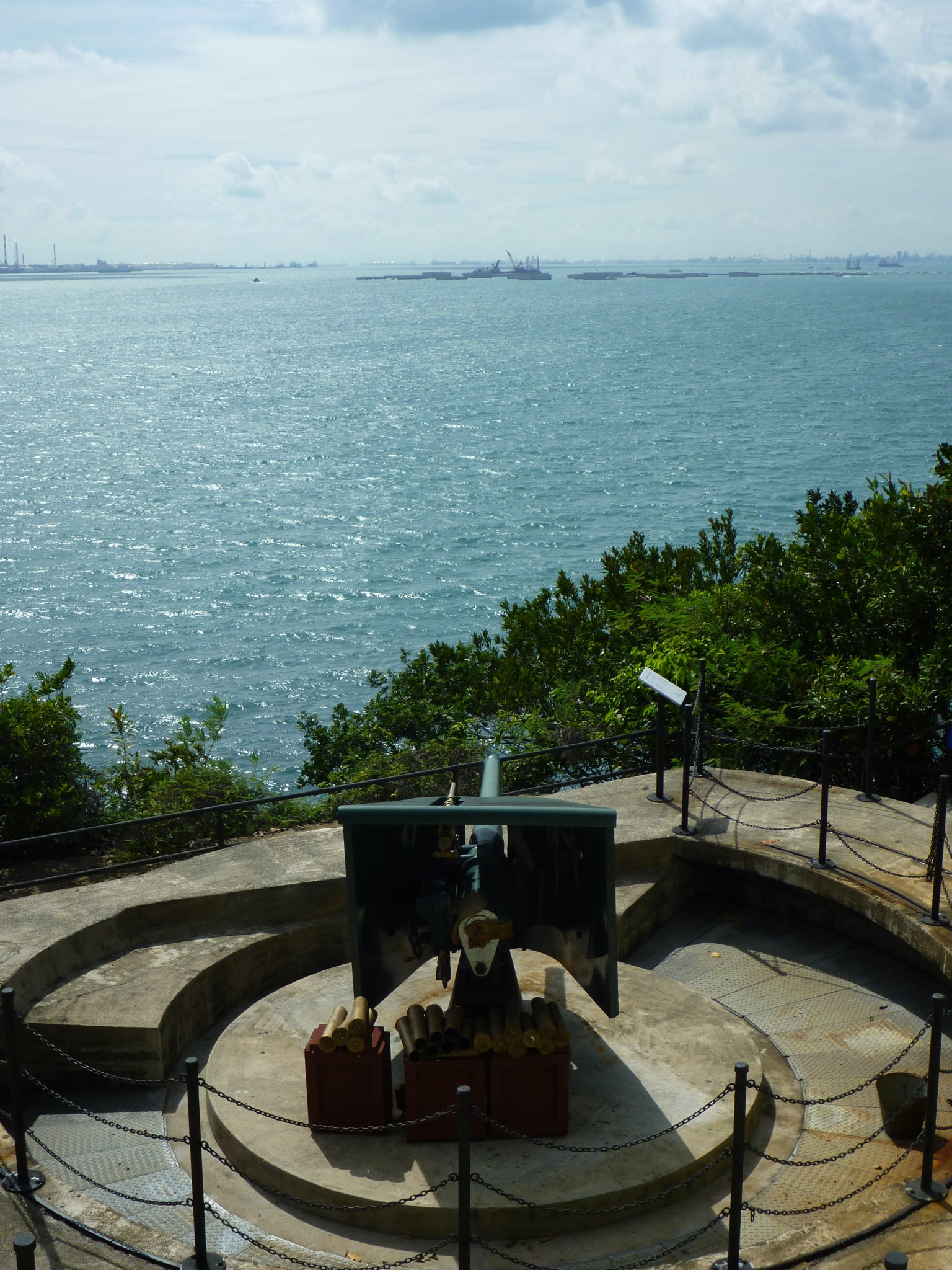

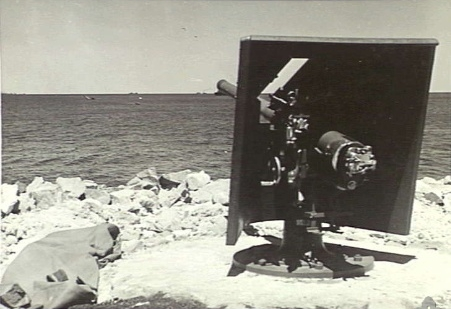

== See also ==
- List of naval guns
