= Priddy's Hard =

Former military installation in Gosport, Hampshire, England

Coordinates: 50°48′24″N 1°7′32″W

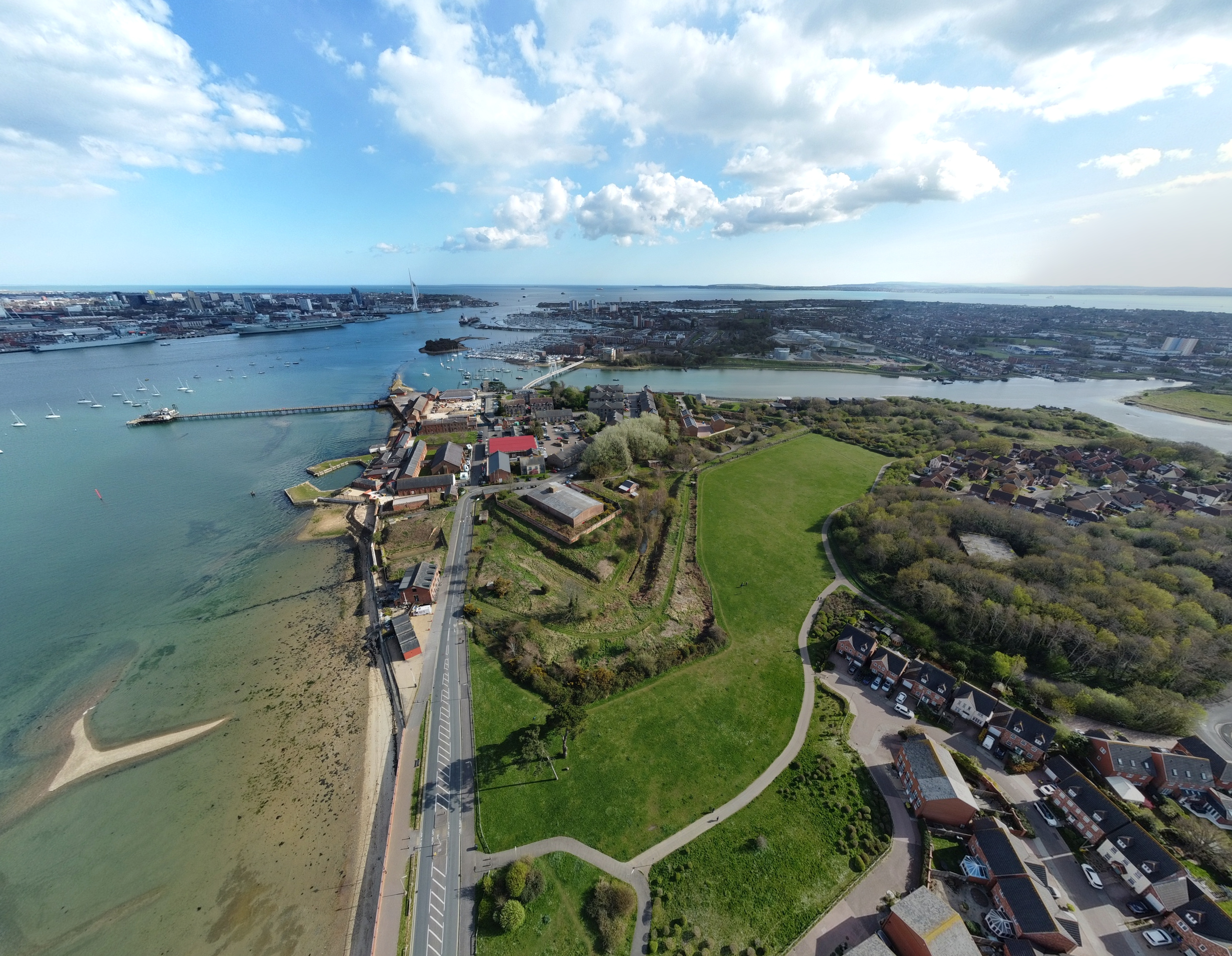
Priddy's Hard with its defensive earthworks. In the centre of the picture is "E" Magazine, built within a demi-bastion; beyond it are the historic buildings of the ordnance depot. The large tree-filled circle to the right surrounds the Cordite Magazine of 1898.

Priddy's Hard is a former military installation in Gosport on the south coast of England, named for the original landowner and the firm beach found there.

The site originated as a 1750s fort, and then became an armaments depot for Royal Navy and British Army weapons, explosives and other stores. The site was decommissioned in 1988, after over two hundred years of operation, with part now being developed for housing and an area retained as a museum.

== History ==
=== Eighteenth century ===
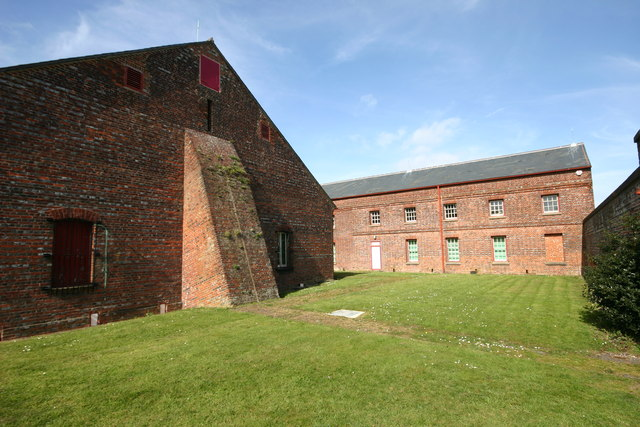
Former gunpowder magazine at Priddy's Hard, dating from 1771: "A" Magazine (left), and beyond it the south part of "B" Magazine (dating from 1773 and originally built as a cooperage).

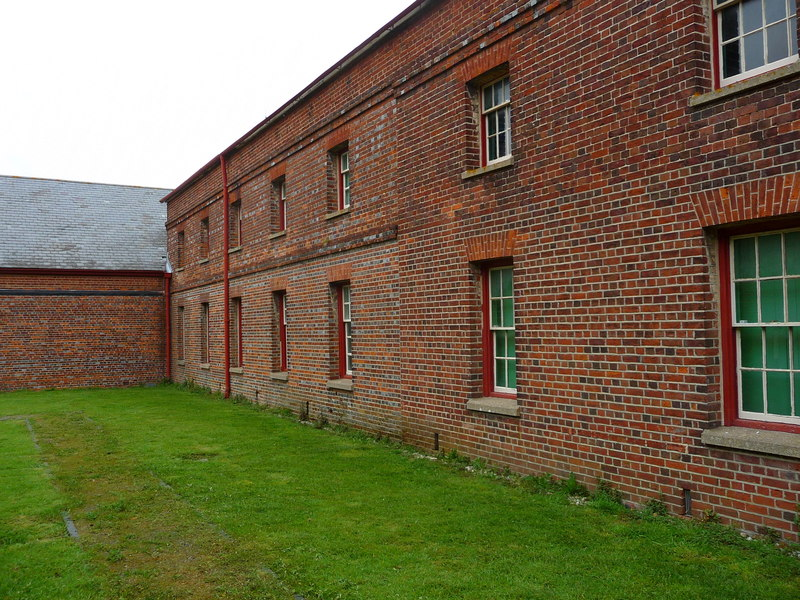
The north part of "B" Magazine was built as a shifting room, for the examination of gunpowder. Between the shifting room and the cooperage a rolling way led from "A" Magazine to the Camber basin, where barrels of gunpowder could be loaded on to boats.

==== Priddy's Hard Fort ====
In 1750 by an Act of King George III the Board of Ordnance purchased 40 acres (16 ha) of agricultural land in Gosport and a boatyard from Jane Priddy and Fareham Vicar, Thomas Missing. This was to construct an earthen rampart as part of an extension of the defences of Portsmouth Harbour and the Royal Dockyard, the Gosport Lines. The ramparts were completed in 1757 and the land enclosed known to as Priddy's Hard Fort; it was manned by the Army. In the nineteenth century Priddy's Hard Fort was armed with 14 eighteen pounder guns.

==== Proposals for a gunpowder magazine ====
In 1764, after a series of petitions sent to the Master-General of the Ordnance from the general public, the decision was made to remove gunpowder from Old Portsmouth, where it had been stored since the 1580s in the Square Tower. The problem had been raised as early as 1716 in a report to the Master-General by the local Ordnance Storekeeper in Portsmouth:

First. In carrying powder from thence to the hoys about 400 yards (367 m) distance to the end of the Point, and by shaking the barrels together in a Cart there has been a train along that street, which in War time is the most popular part of the town.

Second. When funerals pass by there the sparks of the Links and Torches have been seen to fly against the Magazine Walls and Windows.

Third. At shipping off the Powder from the Point among a crowd of drunken, smoking, sailors tending to the Men of Wars boats is also a very great hazard.

Fourth. This Magazine being next to the sea and within reach of Shipping, makes it a good Mark to Bombard where 6,000 barrels (950 m^{3}) of Powder are lodged.

5th. When Spring Tides come into the Ground Room under the Foundation of the Wall, and strike up damps, which might be cured by Arching over that places; but since the other inconveniences are so great to cause the Ruin of this Place and from miles around: Am humbly of the opinion a New Magazine in the Harbour, free from the said Hazards would be most for the safety of this port.

If the Magazine had exploded the casualties would have been appalling in this densely populated part of Portsmouth. Serious accidents with gunpowder were well known, some of them were recorded as follows:

- 1649, Tower Street, London — 60 houses demolished after 37 barrels detonated in a shop.
- 1654, Gravelines — explosion of magazine, 3,000 killed.
- 1693, Dublin — detonation of 218 barrels, 100 killed.
- 1739, Brescia — lightning strike, 3,000 killed.

Various proposals were suggested as to where to build the new gunpowder magazine: Priddy's Hard, Boatswain's Hill Coppice (where Defence Munitions Gosport is today), and Horsea Island in the eastern reaches of Portsmouth Harbour. None of the sites were considered ideal, including Priddy's Hard, the main concern being the closeness of the Royal Dockyard, this would eventually lead to its final closure.

Priddy's Hard was chosen due to the availability of the land (already owned by the Crown) and in December 1766 the decision was finally made by the Ordnance Board and the First Lord of the Admiralty.

==== Establishment of the Ordnance Depot ====
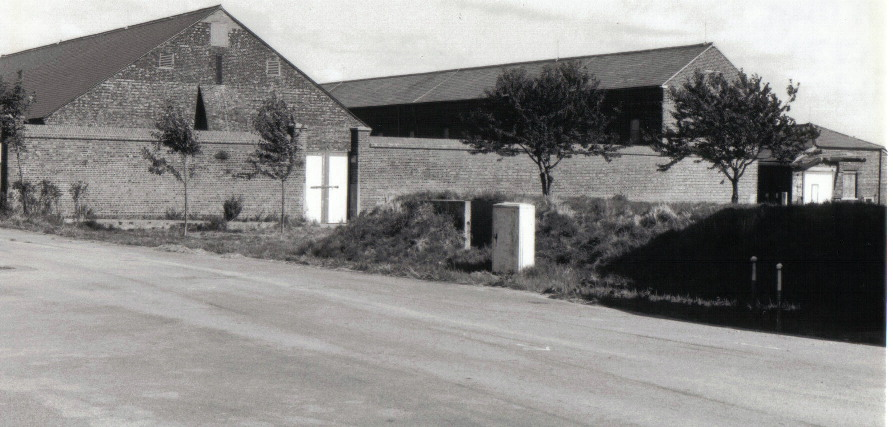
The Grand Magazine behind its enclosing wall.

Construction of the new powder magazine on land within the ramparts commenced in 1771. The Grand Magazine (as it became) was enclosed with a high brick wall to assist with security and to ensure no contraband items were brought into the magazine; these items included ferrous objects (to reduce the risk of sparks), alcohol and smoking materials. It took six years for the complex to be completed.

The site needed to be accessible by boat: new gunpowder would be delivered by barge from the Royal Powder Mills at Faversham and Waltham Abbey and then conveyed to and from ships using small sailing vessels called hoys. It was initially assumed that the gunpowder barrels would be unloaded on the hard (after which the site was named) and thereby conveyed across the foreshore; but when the time came, it was decided to construct a camber basin (in place of the hard) to enable the vessels to unload much closer to the rear of the magazine. However, access to the camber by hoys was a problem from the very beginning: although the camber basin was constructed with a sluice to help prevent silting up, vessels still had difficulty entering it at any other time than high tide. This problem was solved by the construction of a pier (later known as the Old Powder Pier) on the eastern side of the camber basin, the remains of which can be seen at low water.

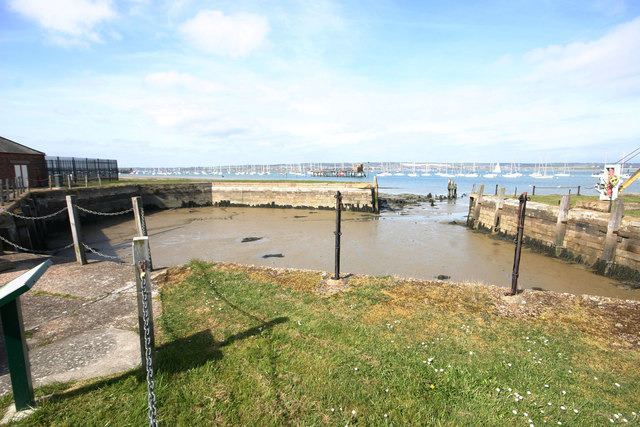
Camber Dock & Basin

Barrels of gunpowder were moved between the camber and the magazine by means of what was called the 'rolling way' (the barrels were never rolled individually but placed in trolleys). Within the magazine compound, on either side of the rolling way, a pair of two-storey buildings were erected, one of which served as a shifting house (for examining the powder), the other as a cooperage (though it was soon converted into a second shifting house); later known as the North and South Stores, these buildings were expanded and connected together in the early 19th century to form a single long building which stands parallel with the magazine.

For security, a guardhouse was built at around this time to the north of the magazine, just inside the main entrance through the ramparts. There was also a small barracks block within the northernmost demi-bastion (where "E" Magazine stands today), but neither it nor the guardhouse have survived; (from 1807 nearby Forton Barracks accommodated artillery troops, who manned the fortifications and in 1833 the Dockyard Police Force took over the task of guarding the depot itself).

A large house, the Officers' Residence, was built facing Forton Creek in 1783; surrounded by spacious gardens, it provided accommodation for the three senior officers of the depot: the Storekeeper, the Clerk of the Cheque and the Clerk of the Survey.

The addition of a further two magazines flanking either end and at right angles to the Grand Magazine was cancelled. A possibility for the cancellation may have been the serious fire in the Portsmouth Royal Dockyard in 1776. The resulting lack of storage capacity was highlighted during the Napoleonic Wars and as a consequence led to the use of hulks as floating gunpowder magazines in the reaches of Fareham Lake (beginning with HMS Bulldog in 1801).

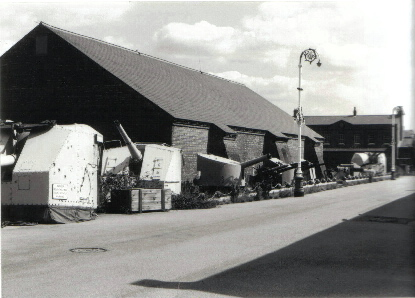
The Grand Magazine was opened in 1777.

By May 1777, the first powder barrels were moved to Priddy's Hard from Portsmouth's Square Tower.

Board of Ordnance 2 May 1777

Gentlemen,

The Board direct that the labourers at the Gun Wharf at Portsmouth assist in removing the Powder from the Town Magazine, and in unloading and stacking the same in the Magazine at Priddy's Hard, this they are to continue to do when business at the Gun Wharf will permit.

Thenceforward Priddy's Hard operated in tandem with the Board of Ordnance's other main Portsmouth facility, H.M. Gunwharf (not far from the Dockyard on the other side of the harbour), which stored items other than gunpowder (from cannons and gun carriages to small arms and cutlasses). The Board of Ordnance, through these and other depots, provided gunpowder and artillery pieces for both naval and (land-based) military use. Depots (such as Priddy's Hard) which were built near the Royal Dockyards provided powder not only for use on board the ships of the Royal Navy but also for guns on the dockyard fortifications and for use in military campaigns around the globe.

==== Satellite depots ====
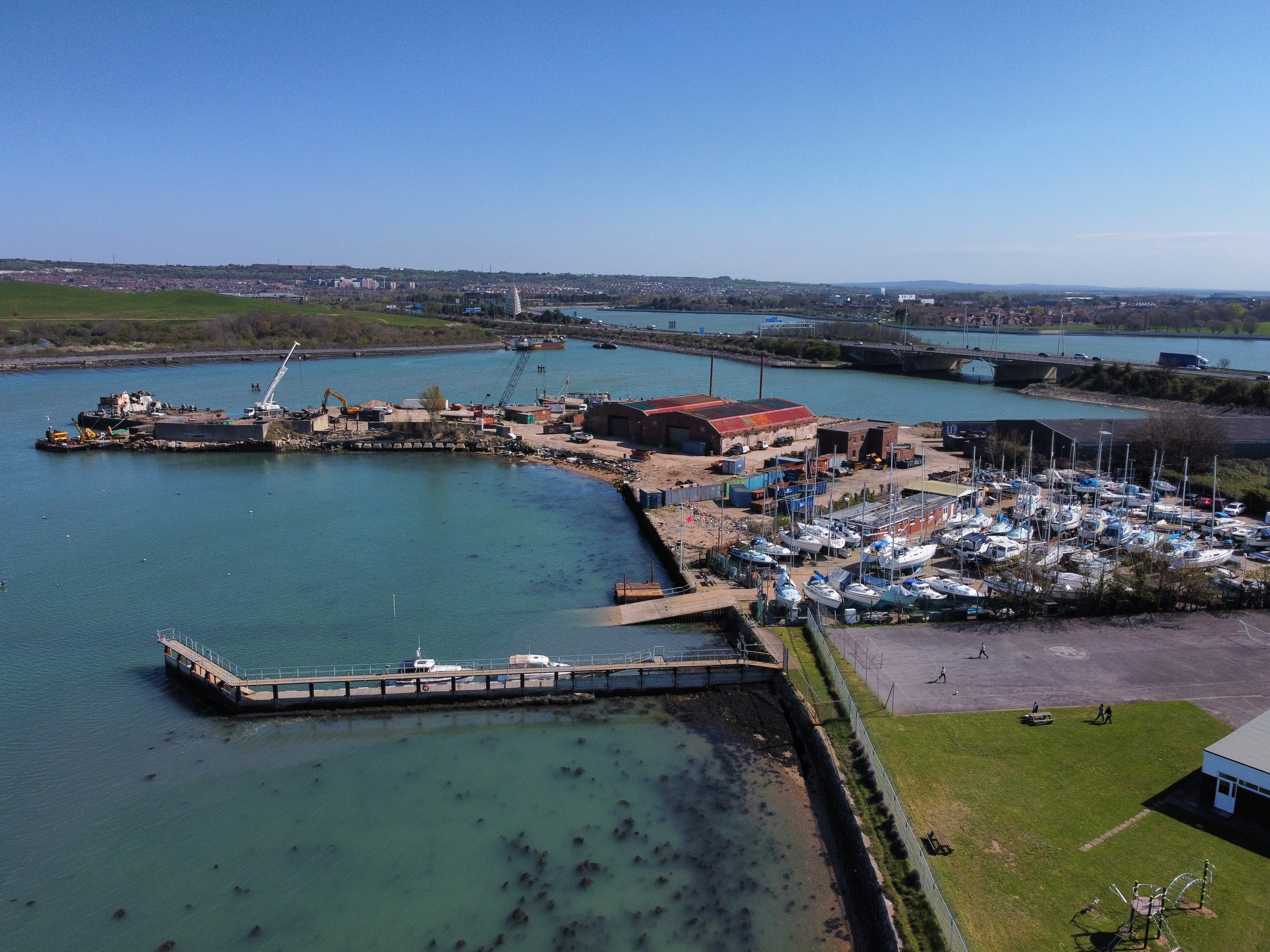
The 18th and 19th-century former gunpowder magazines at Tipner.

Almost as soon as the Priddy's Hard magazine had opened, Britain found itself on a war footing. Although six thousand barrels of gunpowder could be stored there, increasing demand meant that Priddy's Hard struggled to provide what was needed. The pressure was somewhat relieved in 1796 by the construction of a magazine across the harbour at Tipner (the choice of location reflected the policy of the Duke of Richmond, Master-General of the Ordnance, to disperse the nation's stores of gunpowder and thus minimise the potential impact of a single depot being attacked).

In 1804 buildings were constructed on Stamshaw Point and Horsea Island for the repair of damp or damaged gunpowder, which could then be returned for storage and re-use. Records exist for the payment of wages of £5 a month "on account of the Royal Powder Works at Little Horsey Island for wages of the cooper, repairing of boats and barges, keep of dogs etc.."

In addition to the magazine at Tipner and the Powder Works at Stamshaw and Little Horsea, a further three magazines were built by the Board of Ordnance at Marchwood in 1814-16. Throughout, Priddy's Hard remained the most important of these sites.

=== Nineteenth century ===
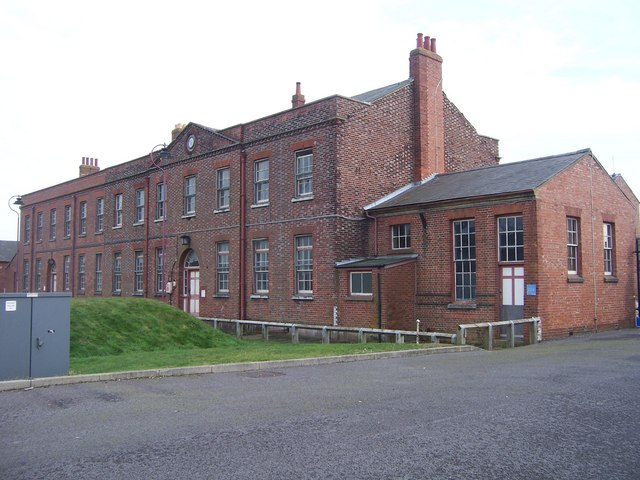
Depot Offices and Storehouse (1811, extended 1920)

In 1804 the rolling way was covered over and additional structures were built alongside it: a foreman's office and a 'shoe room' (where workers were required to change into specialist clothing before entering the magazine). These structures, initially built in timber, were refaced in brick and roofed with slate after the end of the Napoleonic Wars. In 1811 an office building was built to the south of the magazine, with a new cooperage alongside.

By 1846 Priddy's Hard was still under the control of the Board of Ordnance and the following building existed on the site:

- 'A' Powder Magazine — Built to store 6,222 100 lb barrels.
- 'B' Magazine (the former North and South Stores, joined since 1812 by a two-storey connecting building).
- The Inner and Outer Rolling Way to the Magazine, with adjacent office for the Foreman, Shoe-room and Pumphouse.
- Camber Basin.
- Two Demi-Bastions.
- Three Storehouses.
- Two Fire Engine Houses.
- Boathouse.
- Guardhouse (to the north of the Magazine - since demolished).
- Ferryman Lodge (demolished in 1960s). A ferryman was employed to convey officers and employees across Forton Lake before the bridge was built.
- Officers' Residence (demolished in 1950s).
- Houses for Storekeepers, Foreman of Labourers, Cooper & Coxswain.
- Administration block (with apartments for Established Clerk & Office Keeper).

==== The Royal Laboratory ====
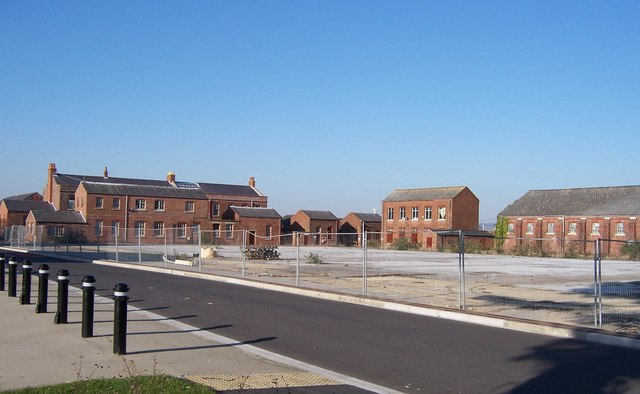
Part of the 1848 Royal Laboratory complex

In 1804, offshoots of the Royal Laboratory (Woolwich) had been established in Portsmouth and Plymouth, their design overseen by the Comptroller, William Congreve. Forty years later the decision was taken to move the Portsmouth Laboratory (which was mostly concerned with the manufacture of small arms ammunition) from Portsea to the more secure surroundings of Priddy's Hard. This took place in 1847-8, with the design of the new complex closely following that of Congreve's original. It marked the start of what was to be a pronounced change of emphasis at Priddy's Hard: from storage to manufacturing.

==== Shell manufacture ====
The establishment of the Royal Laboratory at Priddy's Hard coincided with the increased use of artillery shells on land and at sea. By the 1860s, the filling of shells and preparation of fuzes had become the main work of the Royal Laboratory (the manufacture of small arms cartridges having moved in 1859 to a group of buildings to the west, just inside the ramparts). Before long, new purpose-built structures were added to the eastern edge of the site to deal with the manufacture of shells; a tramway linked each of these buildings (and each stage of the process), from 'C' Magazine through the Laboratory complex and on to a new pier (the Shell Pier).

- 1861 - "C" Powder (60 Tons) Magazine (initially built as a 'receipt & issue' magazine for ships returning to port).
- 1865 - Case Store (the first of several such buildings grouped around the old 'A' Magazine and designed for storing the wooden boxes in which shells were individually packed).
- 1866 - Six Shell Filling Rooms (south of the Laboratory - demolished).
- c. 1866 - "D" Magazine (south of the Laboratory - demolished; built as an 'expense magazine' supplying the shell filling rooms).
- 1879 - Shell Store, built (adjacent to a new pier) for storage of filled shells prior to despatch by boat.
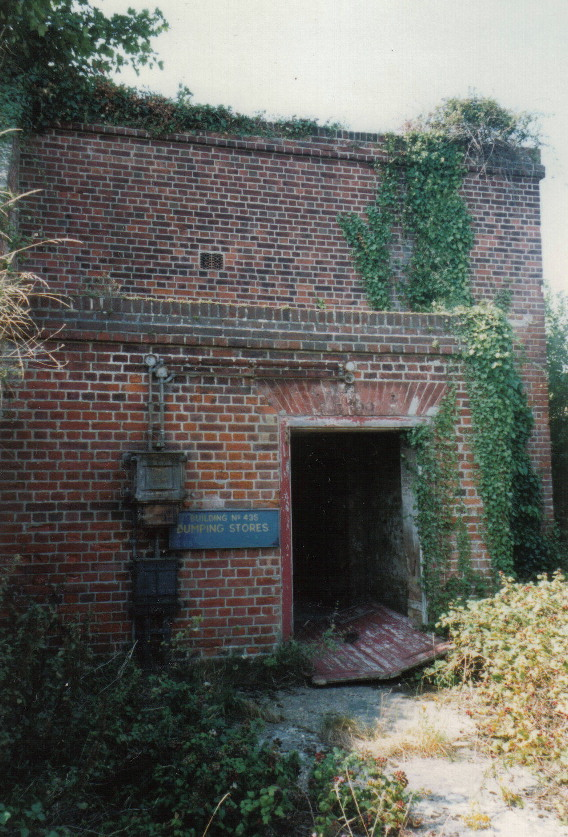
1861 "C" Powder Magazine

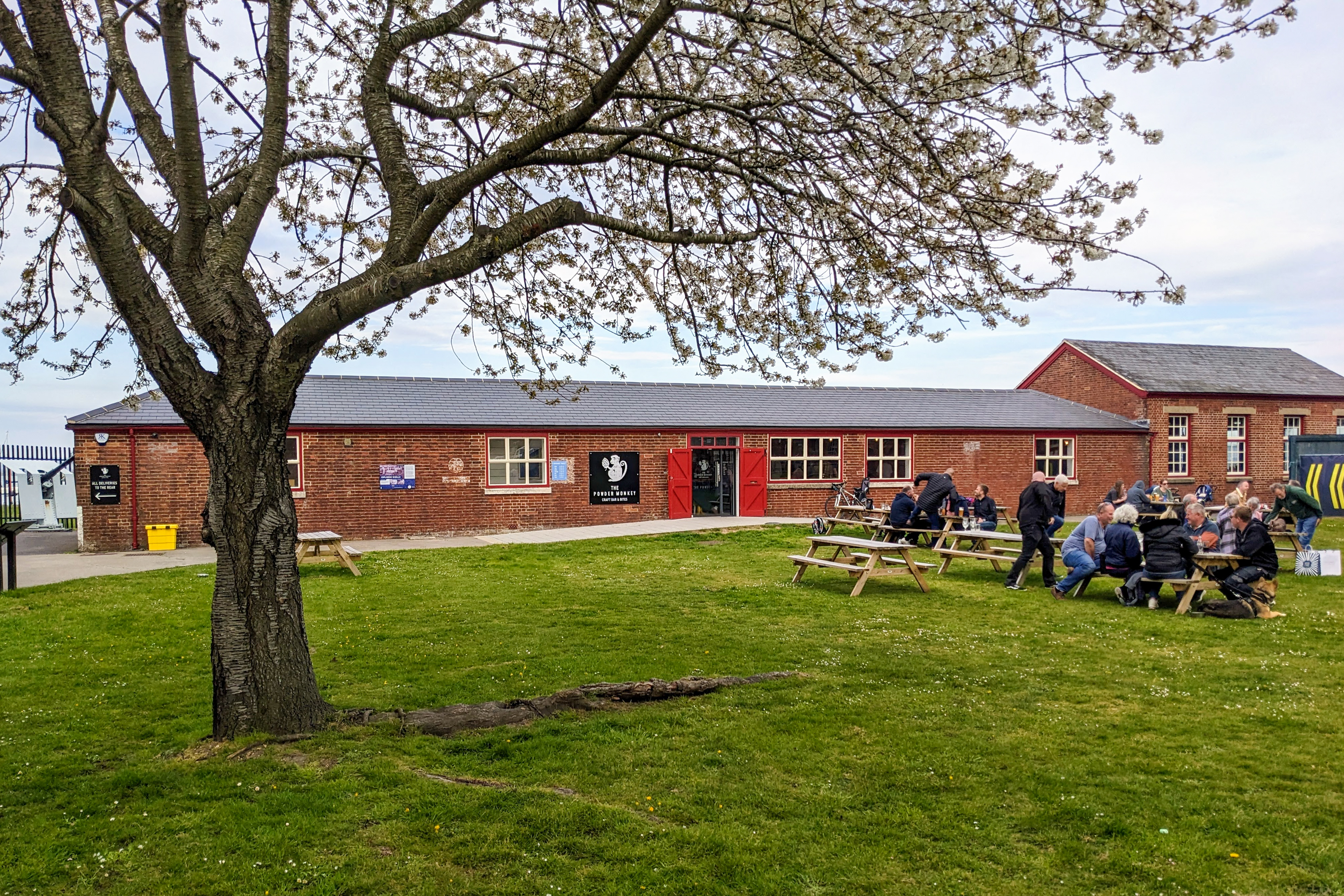
1865 Case Store

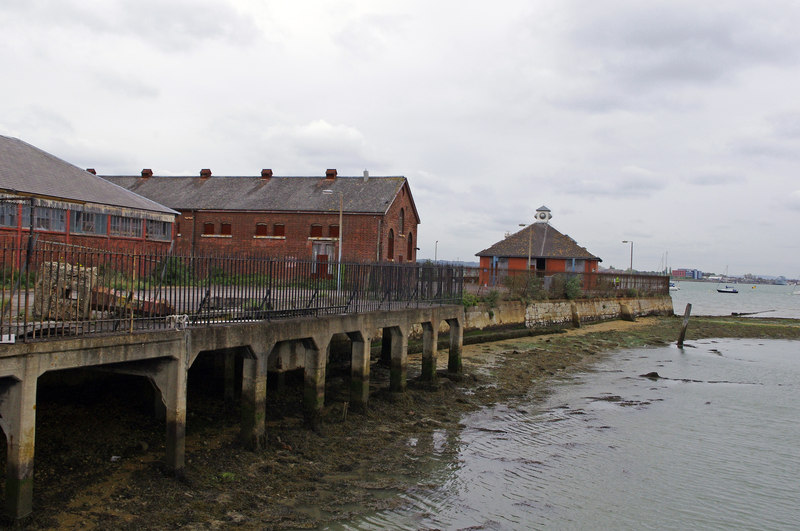
1879 Shell Store (centre-left)

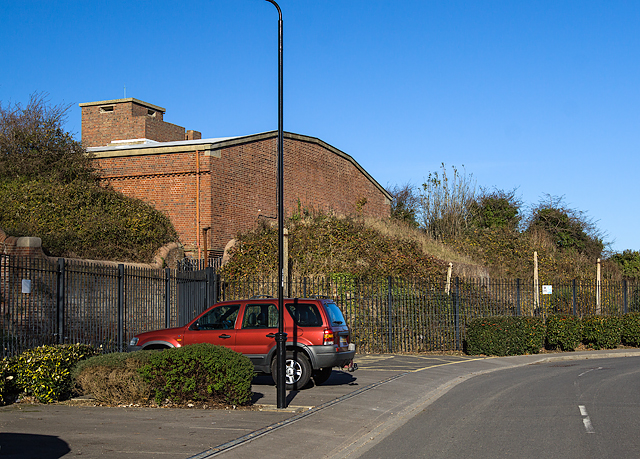
1879 "E" Powder Magazine (pillbox added in World War II)

In 1879 a new magazine was built within the northern bastion; detached from the central area and served by its own pier (the New Powder Pier, 1876), it replaced the 18th-century "A" magazine as the depot's main storage magazine (thereafter "A" magazine was used to store filled shells, rockets and small arms ammunition):

- 1879 - "E" Powder (500 Tons) Magazine.

In 1883, an explosion in one of the shell filling rooms led to much activity being removed from the central area of the site to the west, beyond the ramparts, where several new buildings were erected alongside Forton Creek, all linked to the main site by tramway:

- 1886 - Shell Filling Rooms and Fusing Rooms. (demolished c. 2008)
- 1886 - Expense Magazine for the Shell Filling Rooms.
- 1887 - Unheading Room (where powder barrels from the magazine were opened ready for use in the shell filling rooms); adjacent to the expense magazine.
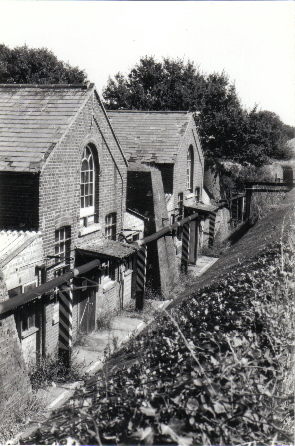
1886 Shell Filling Rooms

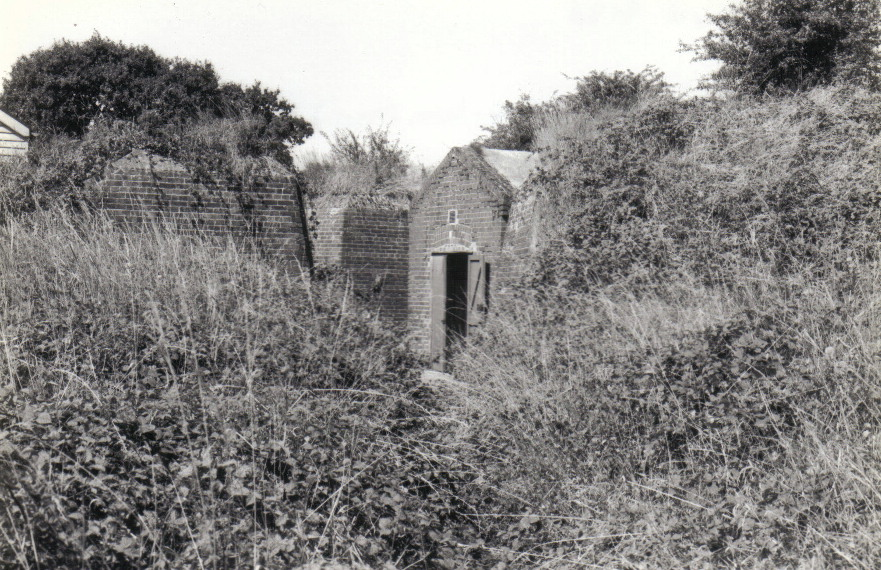
1886 Expense Magazine

Before long, facilities were added at Forton Creek for filling new Quick Firing (QF) shells; these were connected by a separate tramway to their own storage facilities, which were located alongside the 18th-century 'A' Magazine.

- 1888 - QF Shell Filling Room (Building No 342).
- 1889 - QF Shell Store.
- 1896 - QF Shell Store.
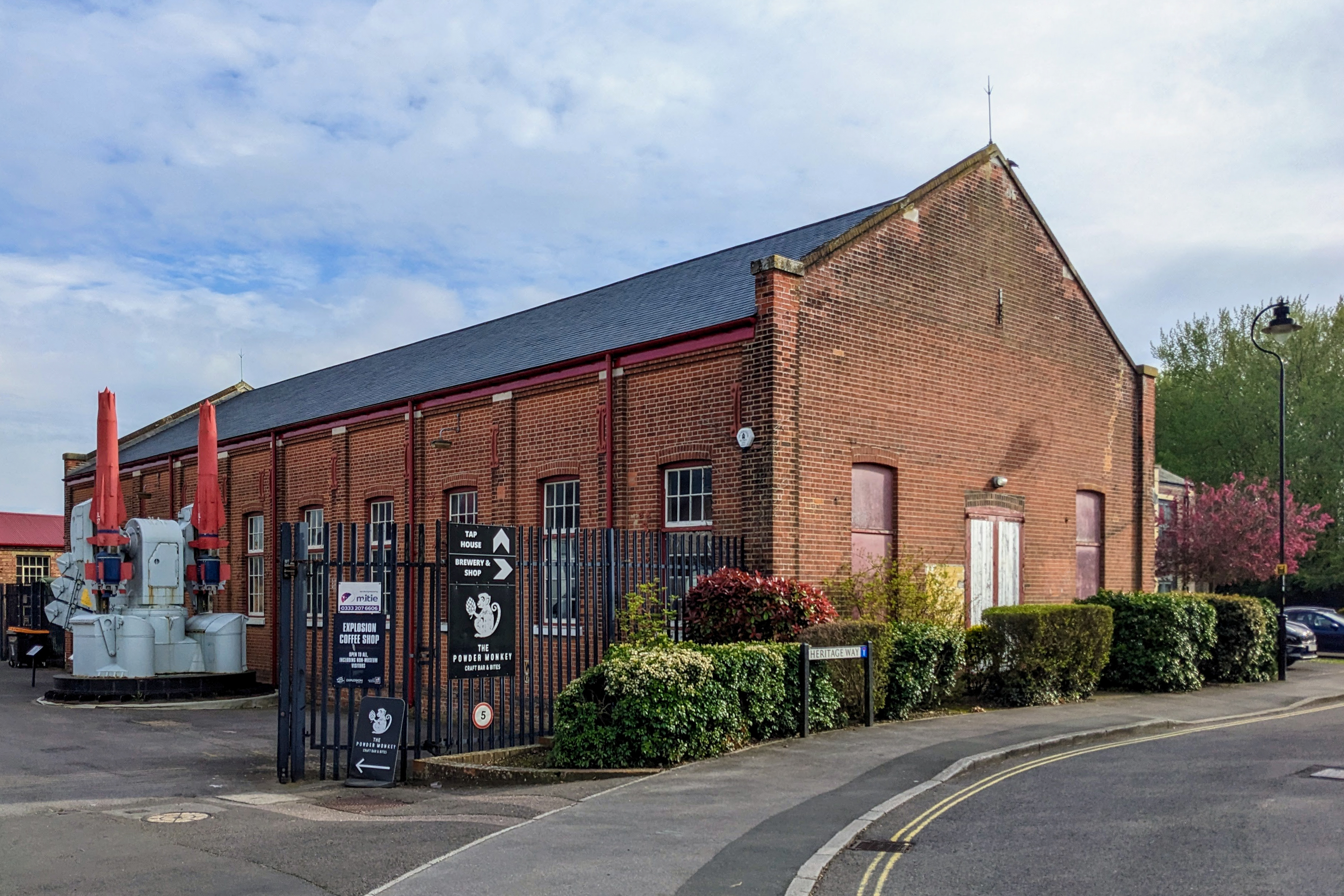
1896 Quick Fire Shell Store

From the 1890s new types of explosive were coming into use, including guncotton and cordite. These needed their own specialized buildings for preparation and storage, which were for the most part built outside the ramparts, north and north-west of the historic centre (most of these buildings have been demolished). In 1896 a 'New Laboratory' complex was constructed, consisting of several small wooden buildings embedded in the southern section of the ramparts, for filling cartridges either with powder (supplied direct from 'E' Magazine) or cordite. At the same time, a series of massive new stores for filled shells were provided within the quadrangle of the old Royal Laboratory near the loading pier, alongside a new storehouse for naval mines.

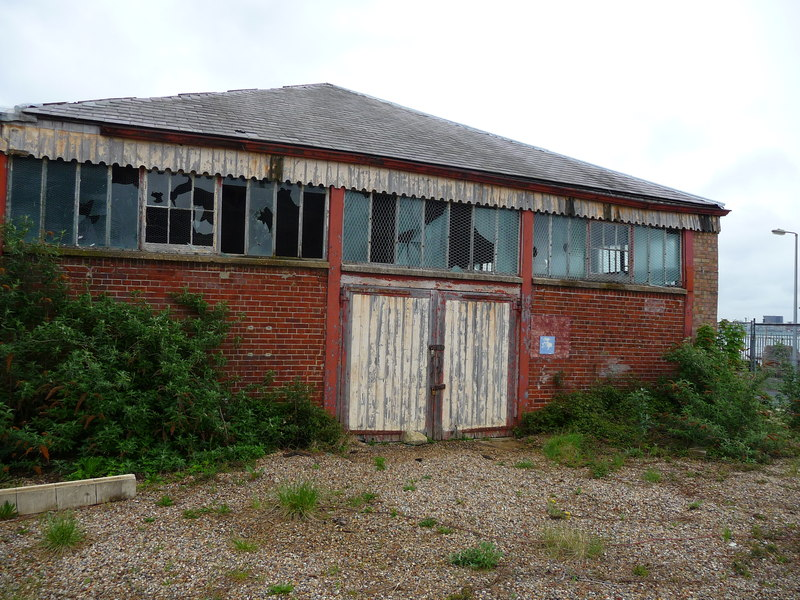
Part of the former Shell Store of 1896 (Bldg No 406), awaiting renovation

- 1896 - Shell Store. (Building No 406)
- 1897 - Twelve Cartridge Rooms (separate rooms for filling, weighing, labelling and boxing cartridges).
- 1898 - Cordite Magazine (Building No 454) (large moated storage magazine).
- 1899 - New Shell Store. (Building No 407) (demolished 2004 following an arson attack)
- 1899 - Mines and Countermines Store. (Building No 409) (used as a guncotton store from 1913).
- 1900 - Dry Guncotton (50 Tons) Magazine.
- 1900 - Wet Guncotton (360 Tons) Magazine.
- 1900 - Shell Painting Room (Building No 341).
- 1902 - Room for the Conversion of Dangerous Ammunition.
- 1904 - Shell Emptying Room (Building No 345). (for cleaning out condemned ammunition prior to re-use).
- 1905-6 - Cordite Magazines (Buildings 357 & 358). (smaller moated pair of 'expense magazines' providing raw material for the cartridge rooms)
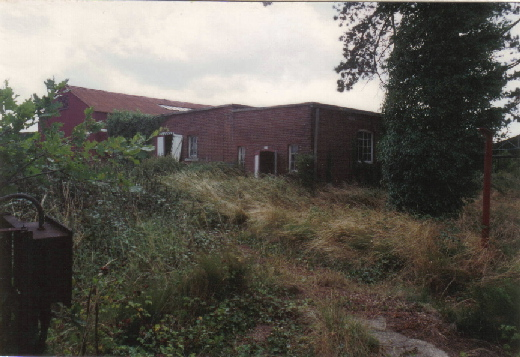
1900 Wet Guncotton Magazine

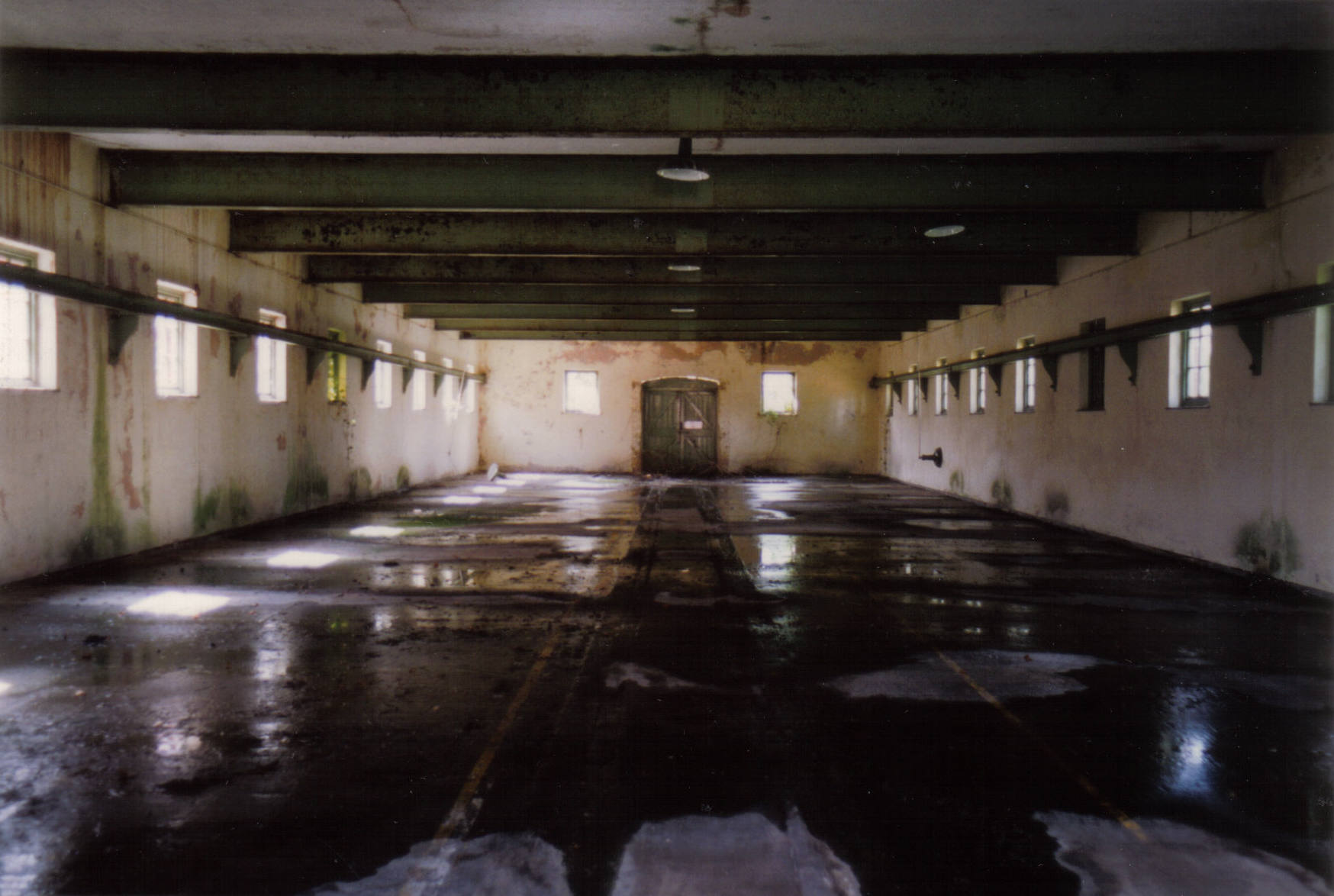
1900 Wet Guncotton Magazine Interior

==== Priddy's Hard Tramway ====
In the 1860s, Priddy's Hard ordnance depot had an 18 in (457 mm) gauge manually-propelled tramway installed for moving powder and ammunition from 'C' Magazine through the Laboratory complex. Known as the 'powder line', it grew into a single line system with spurs into all magazines, explosives stores, cartridge filling rooms, and landing sheds. It extended out on the New Powder Pier in a double line. The rails were made of delta metal, an alloy of copper and zinc, (brass) plus a little iron, as a precaution against sparks; they were grooved rails (set flush with ground level). In 1904 it had 78 trucks. In time it was largely superseded by the 2 ft 6 in (762 mm) narrow gauge line; but part continued in use inside some workshops and stores to about 1960.

The 2 ft 6in line, known as the 'shell tramway', was a double line system with steel rails; the line initially linked the shell-filling rooms and associated buildings to the shell stores and it ran along the length of the shell pier. In 1904 it had 30 trucks plus a travelling crane (all with brass wheels to reduce sparks). These were also manually driven until 1929, when for the first time mechanical propulsion was provided within the yard by a battery-driven locomotive (the first of an eventual total of eight to be provided by Greenwood & Batley Ltd). The tramway ceased operation in 1960 following the acquisition of a number of electric road tractors and trailers; much of the rail network was then lifted and the routes concreted over to form roadways.

=== Twentieth century ===
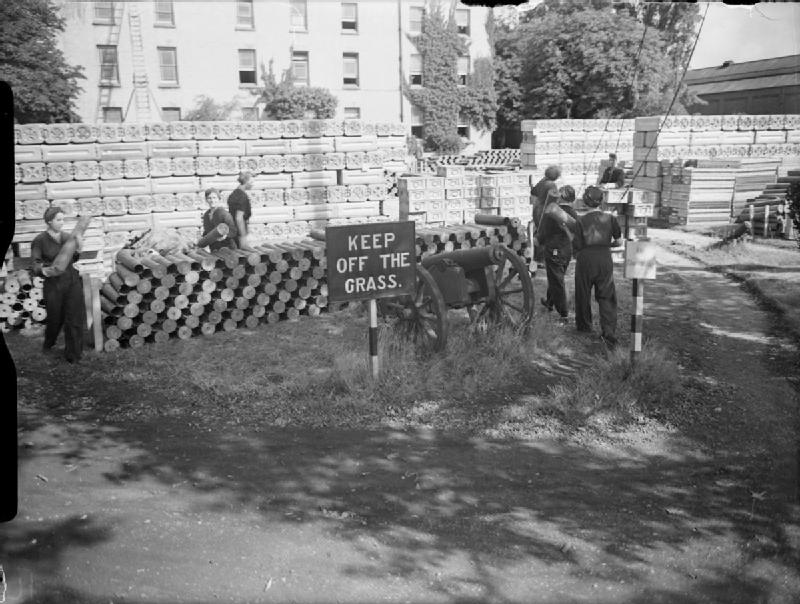
World War II: stacks of brass propellant cartridges along with tin boxes for bagged propellant charges are piled up on the front lawn of the Officers' Residence.

The site was altered continuously during the early 20th century, as new types of ammunition and propellant came into use; however, an explosion in the New Shell Store in 1904 raised concern over the site's proximity to the Royal Dockyard and eventually led to the establishment of a new storage facility north of Priddy's Hard at Bedenham (where construction began in 1908).

Priddy's Hard itself then focussed on the filling of shells and cartridges, rather than on bulk storage. During World War I the sudden increase in demand led to additional filling rooms for cartridges, tubes and artillery fuzes saw added in rows around the cordite magazines (west of the old site); there were also new storage buildings added in this area for mines, bombs and depth charges. New explosives such as trotyl (TNT) and amatol were provided with storage and processing rooms near the shell-filling rooms. A mainline rail connection was first provided in 1914 and three years later a long 'transfer shed' was built alongside the New Shell Store to enable the direct loading of filled shells and other items on to rolling stock.

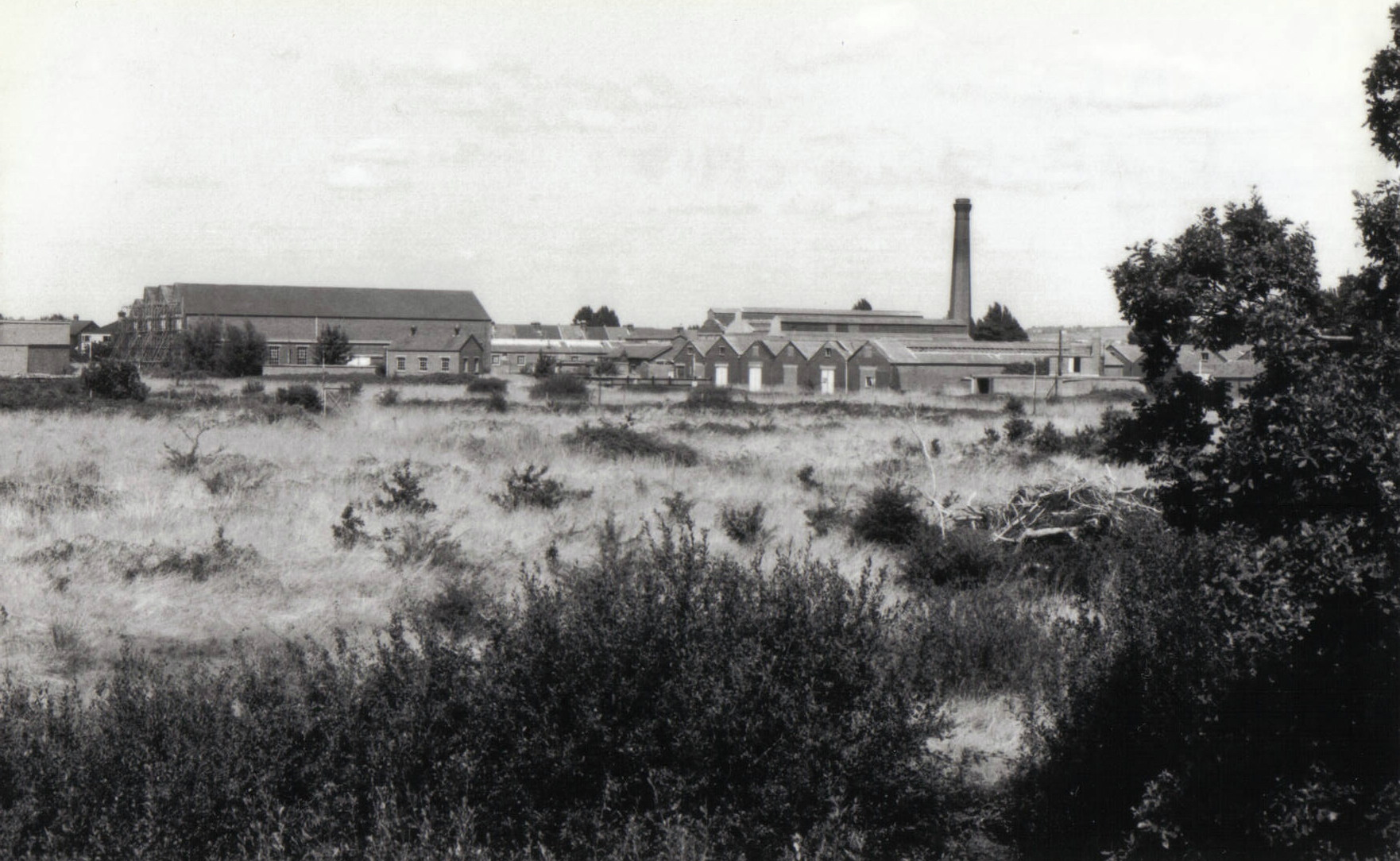
View of the New Gunwharf, Priddy's Hard, taken 1992

1923 saw the closure of H.M. Gunwharf, Portsmouth; its naval facilities and personnel were all transferred to Priddy's Hard, which thereafter became the senior local depot with overall responsibility not only for supply of ammunition, as previously, but also for servicing and repairing all types of naval ordnance equipment from machine guns to depth charge throwers. To accommodate this additional work (naval gun repair in particular) a 'New Gunwharf' was opened at Priddy's Hard (north of the original site, to the east of Green Lane) consisting of a factory, foundry, smithery and other facilities. It also dealt with small arms repairs and included a testing range for rifles, pistols and machine guns; and there was a repair shop for locomotives and other rolling stock used around the depot.

Priddy's Hard was fully utilised during World War II when thousands of women workers filled jobs vacated by men on active service.

For many years, Priddy's Hard was both the Royal Navy's and regional Army's armaments depot and supplier of ordnance and training to Commonwealth and Foreign countries, though its significance decreased over time. In 1971 the 18th-century buildings on the site (including "A" and "B" magazines) were given over to serve as an in-house museum, in which items associated with the depot's history were stored and displayed.

The site was last used for significant naval activity during the Falklands Conflict in 1982.

==== Associated sub-depots ====
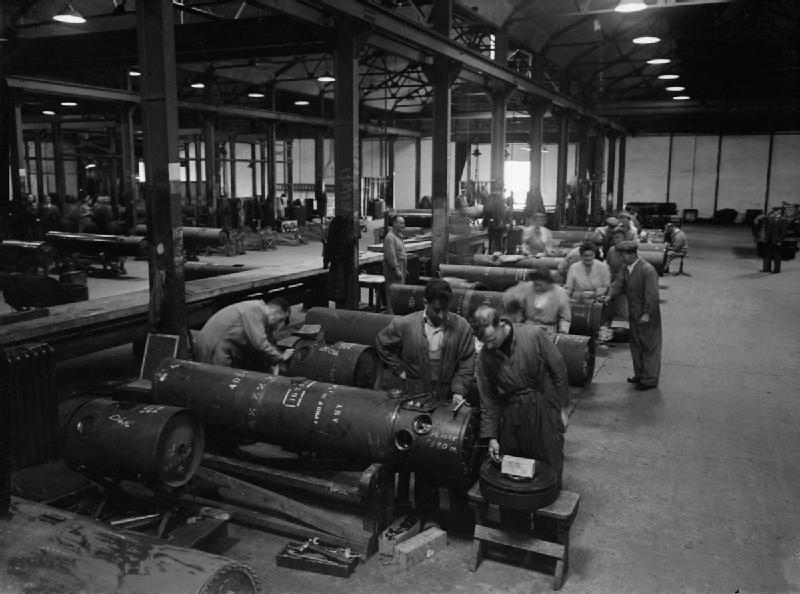
Mine assembly at RNAD Frater, 1944.

During the 20th century, a number of sub-depots were established under the oversight of what became known (from 1918) as Royal Naval Armaments Depot (RNAD) Priddy's Hard:

- Royal Naval Ordnance Depot (later RNAD) Bedenham, to the north of Frater Creek, was opened in 1908, becoming the main local storage facility for gunpowder and other explosives (such as cordite). It was linked to Priddy's Hard via the mainline rail network in 1914, provided with its own pier in 1915 and later linked to RNAD Elson by a road bridge across Frater Creek (opened in 1969). The pier had to be rebuilt following two explosions caused by a fire on board an ammunition lighter moored alongside, on 14 July 1950.
- RNAD Elson, to the south of Frater Creek, was developed as a magazine depot from the early 1920s; (the land had been purchased by the Board of Ordnance in the 1840s-50s, when Fort Elson was built on part of the site). In the 1960s the depot was redeveloped as a repair facility for guided missiles (which were fast replacing guns as the main weapons of the fleet). By the mid-1970s the depot included a pair of cruciform Integrated Weapons Complexes, in which missiles, torpedoes and other weapons were assembled and tested.
- RNAD Frater, to the west of Fort Elson, was established as a Royal Naval Mine Depot (RNMD) in 1918, taking over the work of repairing and testing naval mines in Portsmouth from HMS Vernon. It continued to serve as such until 1959, when (the Admiralty having relocated its various mine facilities to RNMD Milford Haven and RNMD Wrabness) Frater was given over to work on torpedoes and other weapons.

===== The Priddy's Hard, Frater and Bedenham Railway =====
The above depots were served (from 1913) by a standard-gauge internal railway system, which was linked to the Fareham to Gosport main-line but served by fireless locomotives provided by Andrew Barclay Sons & Co. These were replaced with Hunslet Engine Company diesel locomotives from 1944. The network, at its most extensive, had over 18 miles of track; it ceased operation in 1989.

==== Decommissioning ====
Preparatory work was set out in 1976 to relocate all armament support activities and facilities from Priddy's Hard to Elson and Frater. A 1977 memorandum set out a long-term plan for the following decade:

From 1st August 1977, in anticipation of this transfer of activities from Priddy's Hard, the armament facilities currently known collectively as R.N.A.D. Priddy's Hard will be retitled R.N.A.D. Gosport.

The role of the R.N.A.D. will remain unchanged.

The transfer took place progressively over the next ten years. Priddy's Hard was vacated by RNAD Gosport in 1988 when the last remaining stores and staff were relocated. The depots at Bedenham, Elson and Frater continue in operation as part of Defence Equipment and Support under the name Defence Munitions Gosport.

== Present day ==
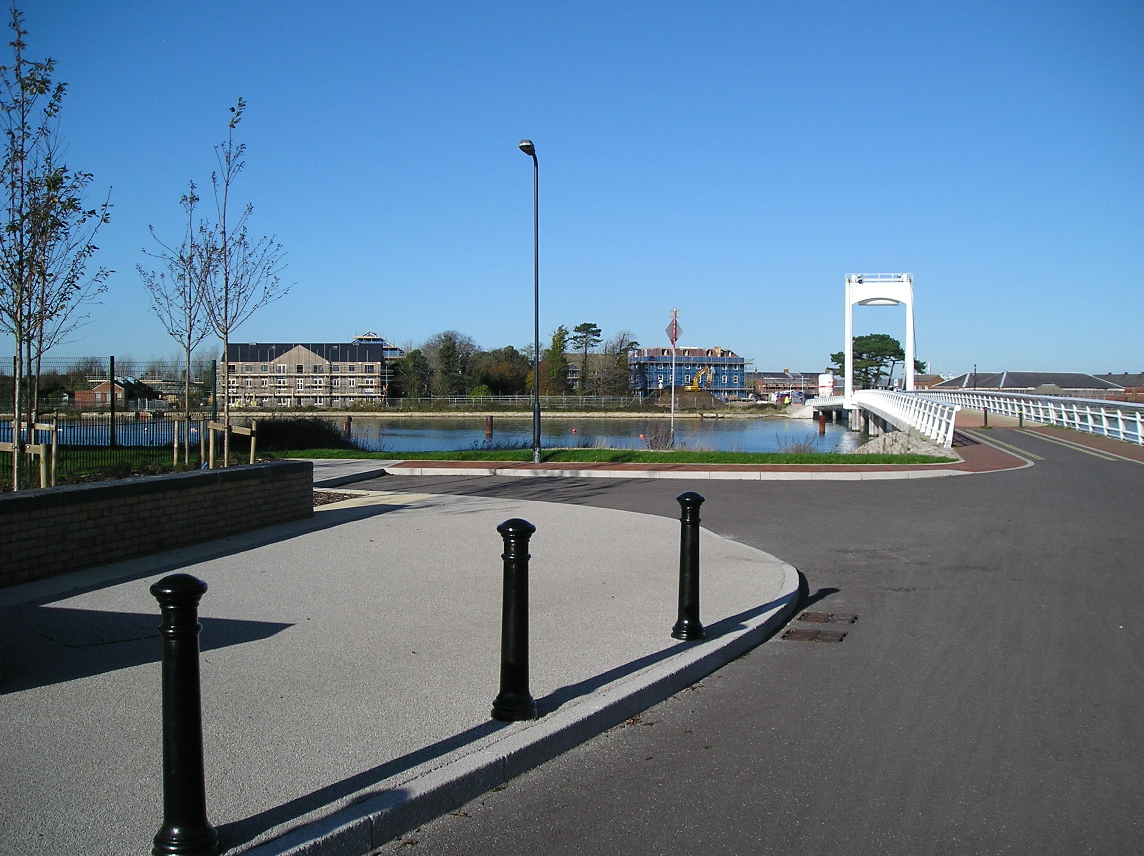
View across the new bridge to Priddy's Hard

The oldest part of the site is now open to the public as the Explosion! Museum of Naval Firepower, which opened in 2001; in 2013 it became a constituent part of the National Museum of the Royal Navy.

A new Millennium footbridge from Gosport town centre was constructed to aid the redevelopment and access to the area. New housing was built around parts of the original site, including an imitation of the early 19th-century Officers' Residence (demolished in the 1950s) which faces the footbridge. In 2004 an arson attack led to the demolition of the sizeable grade II-listed New Shell Store (being used by the council as a warehouse to store wheelie bins) that stood within the Royal Laboratory quadrangle.

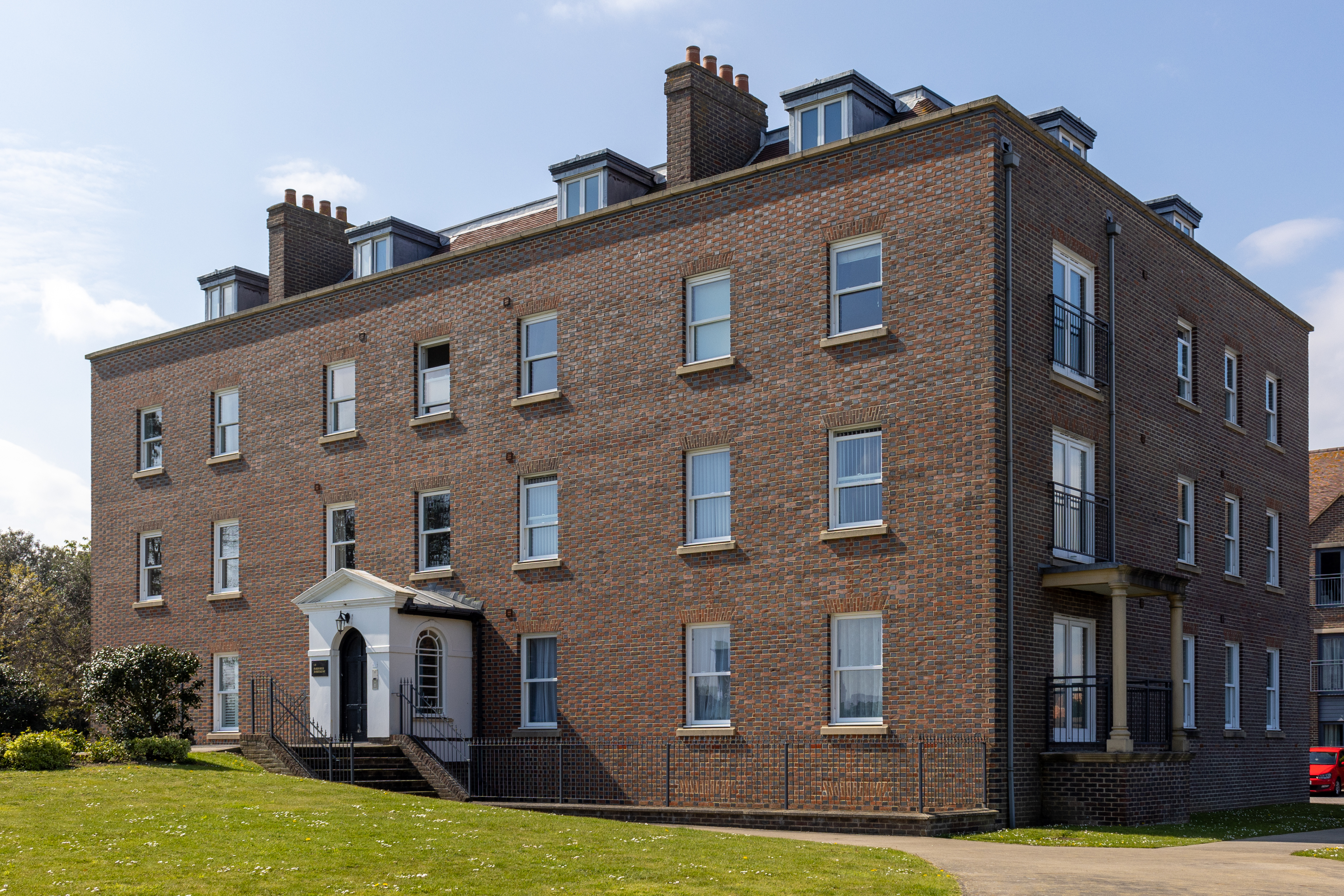
Modern facsimile of the old Officers' Residence

Outside the historic ramparts, many buildings have been demolished for housing, but a broad area around the ramparts, and north of Forton Lake, were set aside and protected in 1998 as a Site of Importance for Nature Conservation (SINC) in mitigation for planning permission being given for 700 new homes on the site. The SINC includes two moated cordite magazines, which provide a habitat for great crested newts and other protected species of reptile and amphibian. Planning permission was given in 2015 for new houses within the listed traverses of the 1886 shell-filling rooms.

In 2009 the 23-acre Priddy's Hard site was acquired from Gosport Council by the Portsmouth Naval Base Property Trust (subsequently renamed the Portsmouth Historic Quarter Trust), with a view to "developing the site, refurbishing the historic buildings and bringing them into new beneficial use". A programme of clearing the historic ramparts of vegetation was begun (although the use of goats for this purpose was discontinued in 2011 after vandals persistently set fire to their straw bedding). Some of the extended areas of the former depot began to be redeveloped for housing.

The site as a whole contains some 26 listed buildings. In 2016 it was announced that initial support had been given for a £1.9 million grant from the Heritage Lottery Fund as part of the Heritage Enterprise programme (which targets projects creating 'new sustainable economic uses for derelict historic buildings'. Two years later a proposal was approved, to include a residential development of 30 new homes (mostly within the south demi-bastion), restoration of eight listed buildings (and the demolition of another) and various new commercial developments.

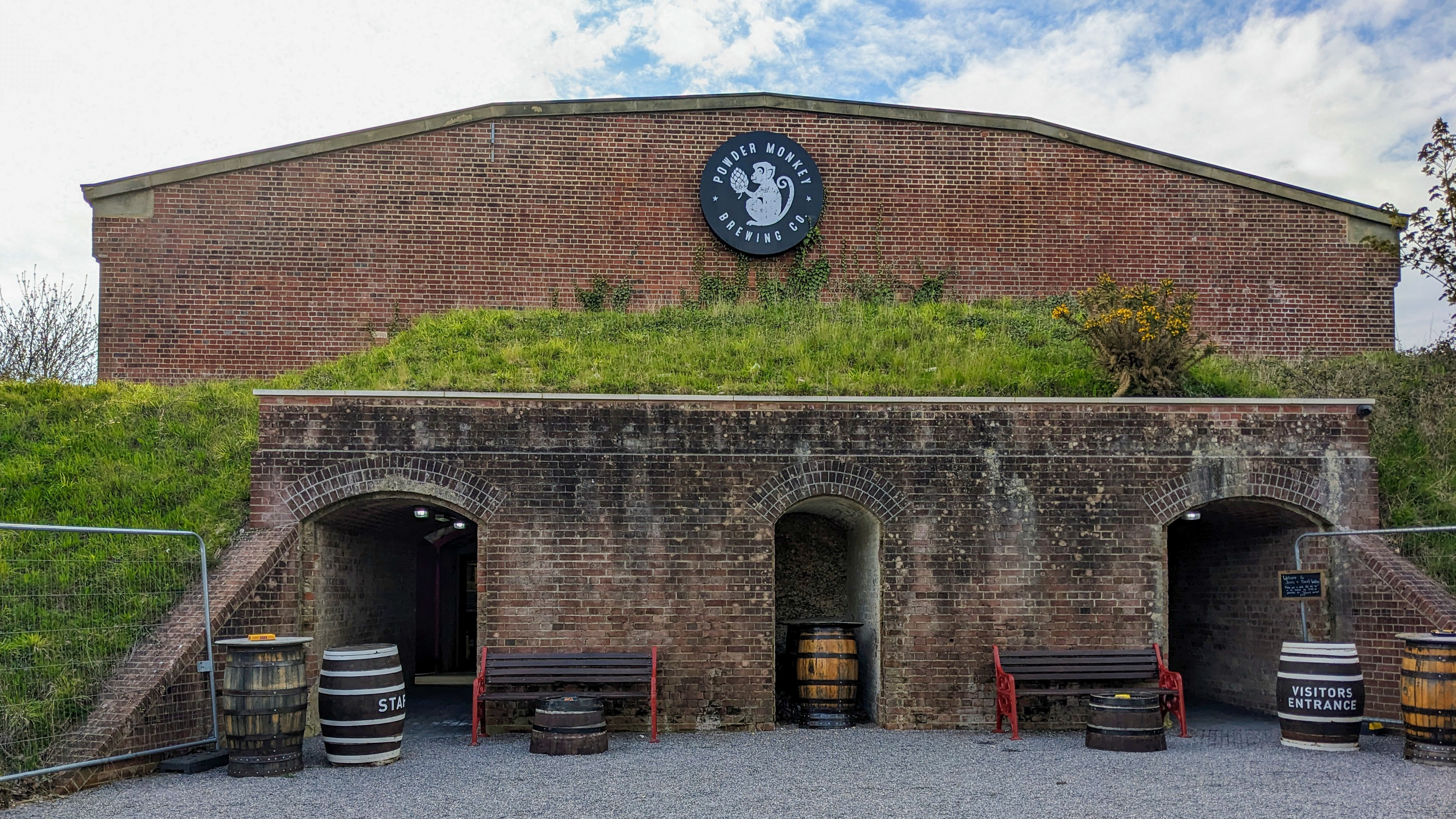
The former 'E' Magazine, now repurposed as a brewery.

As part of this process 'E' Magazine was converted into a micro-brewery, which opened in the summer of 2021 (along with an associated taphouse in one of the old case store buildings on the waterfront). A new Coastal Forces museum (Night Hunters: The Royal Navy’s Coastal Forces at War) was created in the Old Mine Store; it opened in October 2021 and operates as part of the National Museum of the Royal Navy. The old shifting house by the camber was refitted as a holiday let, operating from July 2022; and at around the same time 'C' Magazine was restored and fitted out to provide a base for volunteers working on clearing and maintaining the ramparts. In 2025 a number of artists' studios were opened in the area known as Carpenters' Yard (parts of which are believed to date from the 18th century, having served as stables and a coach house before being used as maintenance workshops in the 20th century).

== See also ==
- Explosion! Museum of Naval Firepower, a museum located at Priddy's Hard
- Gunpowder Magazines in England
- Priddy (disambiguation)
- Hard (nautical)

== Sources ==
- H.W. Semark (1997). The Royal Naval Armament Depots of Priddy's Hard, Elson, Frater and Bedenham (Gosport, Hampshire) 1768 to 1997. Winchester: Hampshire County Council. (2nd Edition, 1998: ISBN 1-85975-132-6).
- W.N. Mansfield (1994), RNAD Priddy's Hard 1846 – 1906. Research Report.
- W.N. Mansfield (1995), "Priddy's Hard 1846 – 1906 — The site impact of the introduction of modern chemical explosives". BSc (Hons) Archaeology dissertation.
