= Hard (nautical) =

Waterside slope for moving boats out of water

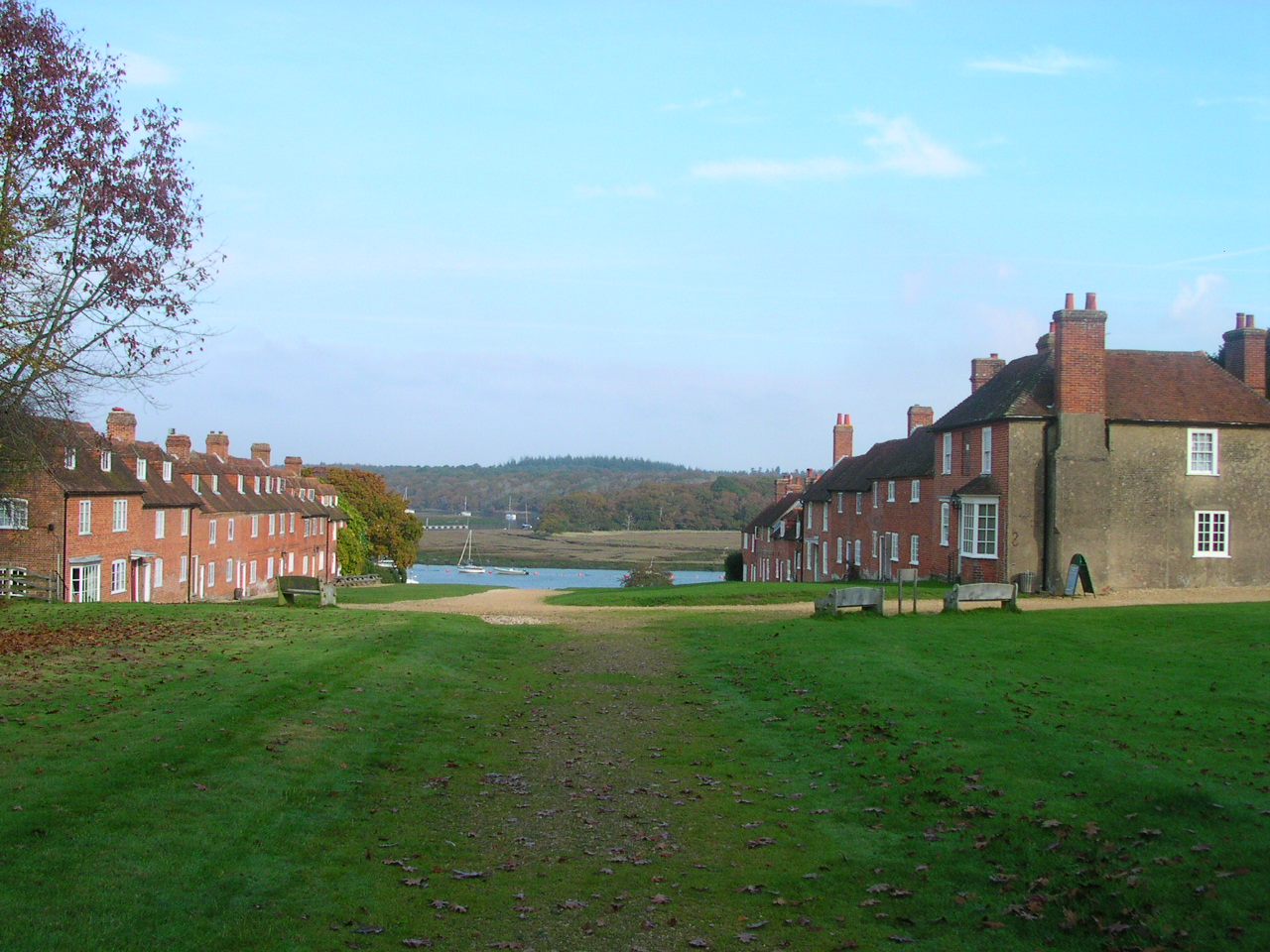
Buckler's Hard

A hard is a firm or paved beach or slope by water that is convenient for hauling boats out of the water. The term is especially used in Hampshire, southern England.

In Portsmouth, the 'Hard' name is said to come from the clay that was deposited on the coastline at low tide, that was dried, becoming a natural slipway.

The term was evidently borrowed at Rye Harbour, East Sussex: 'Boulder Hard' is a gravel point firmed with concrete in the River Rother. Formerly, 'boulderers' (usually fishermen, supplementing their incomes) collected mineral-bearing stones ('boulders') on the shoreline, and brought this material up the river in small boats, to be taken off at this manmade Hard and loaded onto lorries bound for the Staffordshire potteries. The name itself has become obscure.

== See also ==
- Buckler's Hard, Hampshire
- Priddy's Hard, Gosport, Hampshire
- The Hard Interchange, Portsmouth, Hampshire, next to the Hard
- Dock (maritime)
