= Priddy (surname) =

Priddy is an anglicized surname thought by some to be one of the Welsh "patronymics," or names created from the father's name.

== Origin ==
The name may have been derived from the Welsh ap Ridel, meaning "son of Ridel", an ancient Welsh name from the parish of Lillieslead, County Roxburgh. Variations of the Welsh form are ap Rhiddid, meaning "son of Rhiddid", or even ap Redith, which means "son of Redith", a short form of Meredith. If so it has its roots in the personal name Maredudd, of which the Old Welsh form is Morgetiud, of which the first element may mean "pomp" or "splendor" and the second, iudd, meaning "lord". That being the case, Priddy may mean or imply "son of splendid lord" or simply "son of lord."

It is also possible that Priddy was derived from the personal name Predyr or Peredur (perhaps from Old Welsh peri ‘spears’ + dur ‘hard’, ‘steel’), which was borne, in Arthurian legend, by one of the knights of the Round Table.

The name may have been derived from occupational trade, from the Welsh prydydd, meaning "bard".

The name also may have come from those who simply lived in Priddy in Somerset, derived probably from the Celtic words meaning "earth house".

In the case of British Columbia, Canada, politician Penny Priddy, the surname is a respelling of the original "Pretty".

The Priddy article also discusses the etymological origins of the name.

== Variations ==
Some spelling variations of Priddy include:

- Prebble
- Preddle
- Preddy
- Pribble
- Priddell
- Priddle
- Prideaux
- Pridell
- Pridie
- Pridle
- Pridley
- Pridwell
- Pridy
- Pritell
- Prittell
- Prittle
- Pritwell

== People ==
- Alan Priddy, British sailor
- Bob Priddy (baseball), Major League Baseball pitcher from 1962 to 1971
- James Priddy, English cricketer
- Jerry Priddy, Major League Baseball player who was second base from 1941 to 1953
- Katherine Priddy, English singer
- Liesa Priddy, American politician
- Nancy Priddy, American actress and singer-songwriter
- Penny Priddy, politician from British Columbia
- Reid Priddy, American volleyball player
- Robert L. Priddy, American co-founder of several airline companies
- Stewart Priddy, American mathematician joint proposer of the Barratt–Priddy theorem

== See also ==
- Priddy (disambiguation)
