= Priddy (disambiguation) =

Priddy may refer to:

- Priddy (surname)

== Places ==
- Priddy, a village in Somerset, England
- Priddy Caves, caves at Priddy, England
- Priddy Mineries, a reserve in Priddy, England
- Priddy Pools, a place in Priddy, England
- Priddy Nine Barrows and Ashen Hill Barrow Cemeteries
- Priddy Circles, a stone circle or henge monument near the village of Priddy on the Mendip Hills in Somerset, England
- Priddy's Hard, an area of Gosport, in Hampshire, England
- Priddy, Texas, a small town in Texas
- Priddy Independent School District, a school in Priddy, Texas
