= Explosion Museum of Naval Firepower =

Museum in Gosport, Hampshire, England

Coordinates: 50.8075°N 1.1261°W

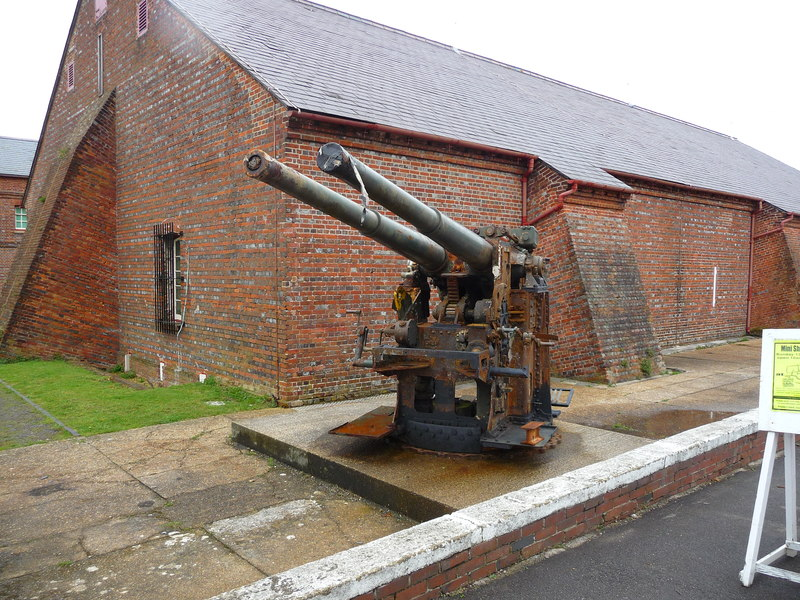
- 18th-century gunpowder magazine within the museum
- Established: 2001
- Location: Gosport, Hampshire, England
- Type: Museum
- Website: Explosion Museum of Naval Firepower

The Explosion Museum of Naval Firepower is situated in the former Royal Naval Armaments Depot at Priddy's Hard, in Gosport, Hampshire, England. It now forms part of the National Museum of the Royal Navy.

The museum includes a wide variety of exhibits ranging from the 18th century to the present day. These range in size from small arms, to missiles and missile launching systems, as well as complete gun turrets. Exhibits range from the Victorian RBL 20 pounder Armstrong gun through to the Second World War QF 4 inch Mk XVI naval gun. Post-war missile systems include the Exocet missile and launcher and Sea Dart missile. Modern weapons are represented in the Sea Wolf missile system and 4.5 inch Mark 8 naval gun.

The weapons cover all aspects of naval warfare including surface to surface, air to surface, surface to air and sub-surface weapons systems, and mines and torpedoes.

The museum has a waterside coffee shop which looks out on to the original 18th-century camber dock.

== Royal Navy Coastal Forces ==
The Night Hunters: the Royal Navy's Coastal Forces at War is a permanent exhibition gallery opened in 2021 and supported by Coastal Forces Heritage Trust, a registered charity.

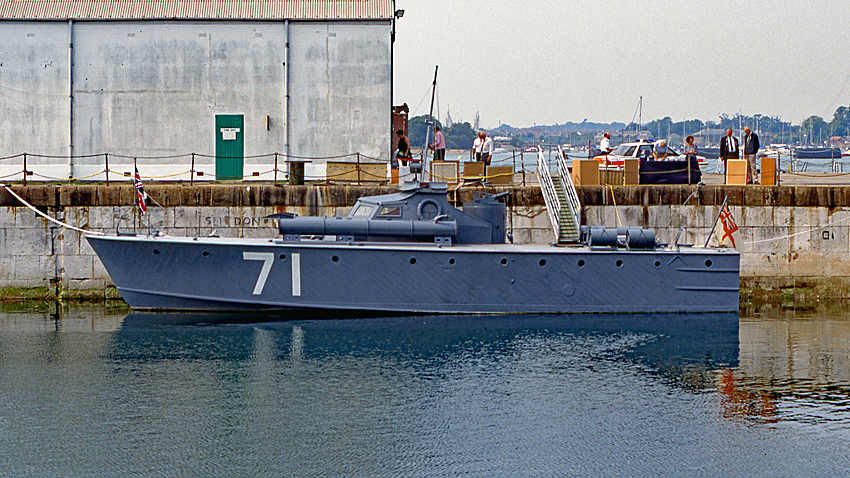
MTB 71 in No 1 Basin, Portsmouth dockyard

The display includes two historic preserved vessels:

- CMB 331 – a 1941 55-foot Thornycroft coastal motor boat
- MTB 71 – a 1940 60-foot Vosper motor torpedo boat
