= Fort Fareham =

Coordinates: 50.840352°N 1.188293°W

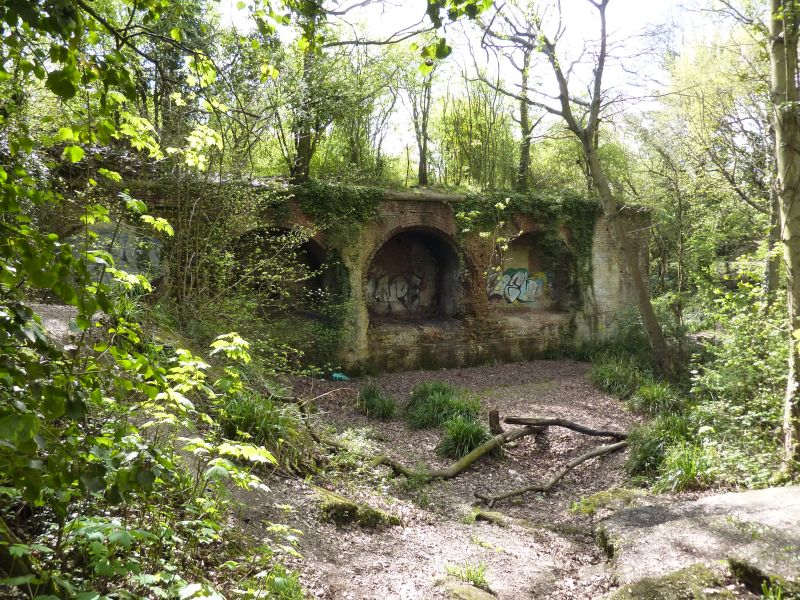
- The north face of the derelict west caponier at Fort Fareham

- Location within Hampshire
- Type: Palmerston Fort
- Location: Fareham

History
- Built: 1861–1868

Site notes
- Area: Hampshire
- Owner: Fareham Urban District Council

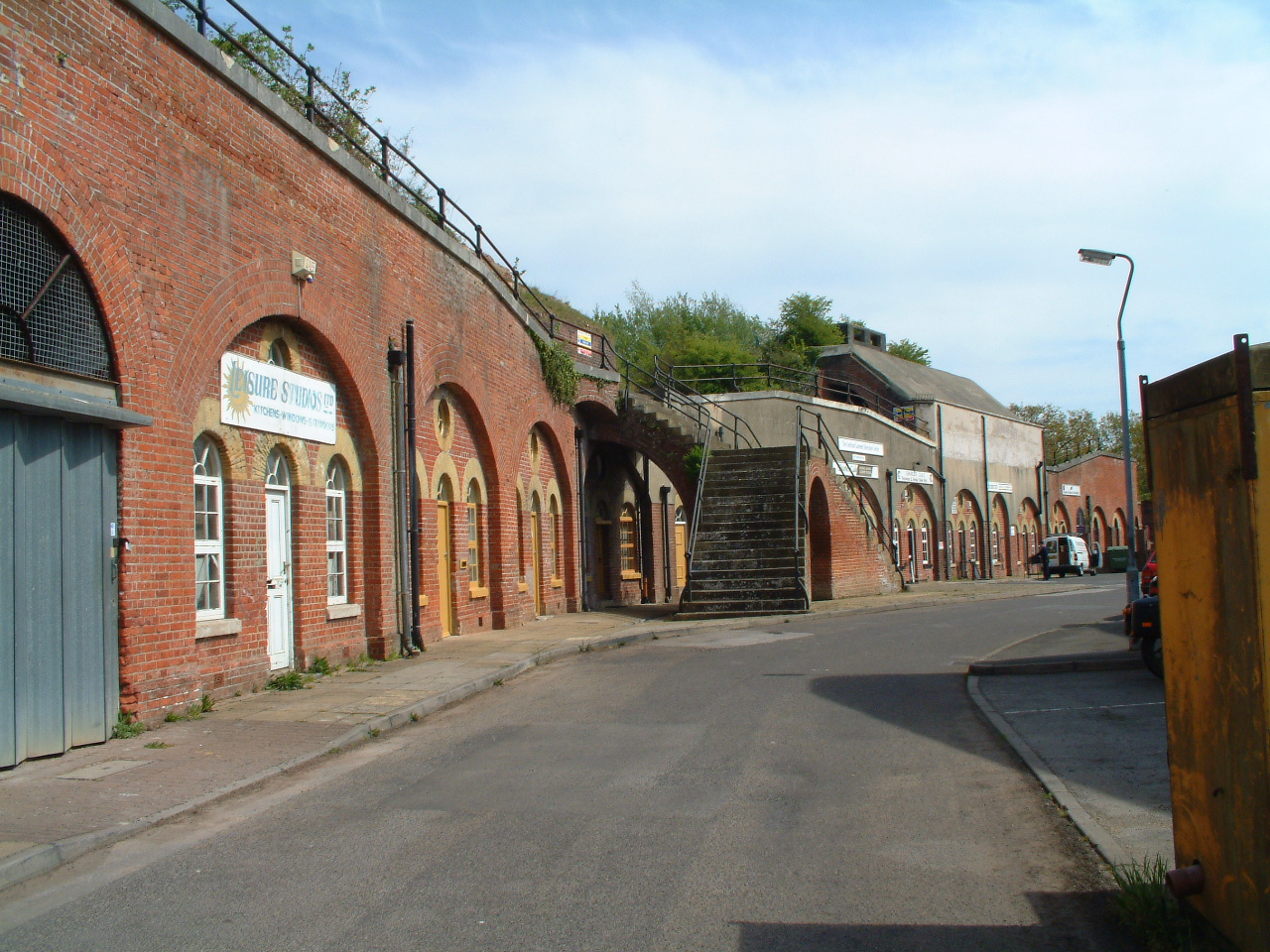
Fort Fareham north casemates with steps to ramparts and officers' mess beyond

Fort Fareham is one of the Palmerston Forts, in Fareham, England. After the Gosport Advanced Line of Fort Brockhurst, Fort Elson, Fort Rowner, Fort Grange and Fort Gomer had been approved by the Royal Commission on the Defence of the United Kingdom a decision was made to build an outer line of three more forts two miles in advance of the Gosport Advanced Line. Of these three projected forts only Fort Fareham was built due to the need to cut costs. It acted as a hinge between the forts on Portsdown Hill and those of the Gosport Advanced Line, filling the gap at Fareham. It has been a Grade II Listed Building since 1976.

== Design ==
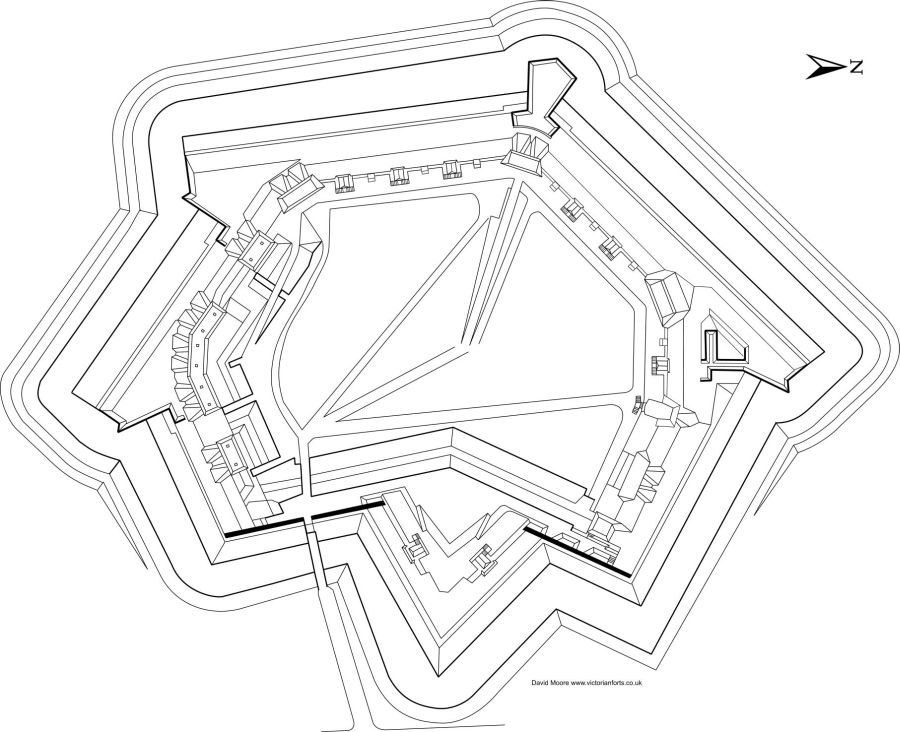
Fort Fareham top plan

Fort Fareham is located on land immediately to the west of Salterns Creek, adjacent to the railway line (which it also protected) from Fareham to Gosport which passed its northeast corner. It is 3,500 yards in advance of Fort Elson, the most northerly fort of the Gosport Advanced Lines. Fort Fareham acted as the link between the Portsdown Hill line of forts and was visible from Fort Wallington which is 2,500 yards to the North and East. The strategically important town of Fareham along with Fareham creek lie in between the two. Fort Fareham was also to provide protection for the road linking Gosport to the Portsdown Forts. Due to the need to protect the ground in front of the Gosport Advanced Line and because of its isolated position Fort Fareham was constructed as a polygonal work with a strong ability to defend itself from being overrun. Its position made an attack on the Gosport Lines very hazardous without it first being captured or disabled.

In trace Fort Fareham is a pentagon with a west facing rampart for the main armament and a north flanking rampart with armament to command the Fareham gap towards Fort Wallington. The ramparts to the south were subject to enfilade fire and were therefore given a greater measure of protection by hiding the guns in a complex range of Haxo casemates. This fort is the only one of the Palmerston Forts to receive such a concentration of Haxo casemates. The fort is surrounded by a ditch that was intended to be wet but problems with obtaining and holding water in this meant that for much of its life the northern portion remained dry. The ditch is ably protected by a grand caponier to the west with smaller demi-caponiers at the north, southwest and south salient angles. A decision was made in the later stages of construction that resulted in the choice of a redan at the rear, closing the gorge of the fort, rather than a self-contained keep, like those of the inner three forts of the Gosport Advanced Line.

== History ==
=== Construction (1861-1868) ===
The construction lasted from 1861 to 1868, with a total cost of £104,557. The report of the 1869 Defence Committee concluded that Fort Fareham was '...skilfully constructed as regards stability and permanency and when completed according to the approved plans will be suited to the requirements of modern armaments, and when its ditch was filled with water would afford a fair amount of resistance to any attack to which it may be exposed.'

=== Active fort (1868-1902) ===
The original design of the fort called for forty-nine 7-inch R.B.L. guns with five 64pr R.M.L. guns (changed to 7-inch R.B.L. guns) on Moncrieff counterweight carriages for the main west rampart, with three rifled howitzers and fifteen smooth bore guns for flank defence of the ditches By the time that the fort was complete the armament had been changed to sixty-four 7-inch R.B.L., five 40 pdr. R.B.L., five 64 pdr. R.M.L. guns with fifteen 32 pdr. S.B.B.L. guns in the caponiers and three Rifled Howitzers. In 1886 the mounted armament was one 7-inch R.B.L. gun and two 6.3-inch Rifled Muzzle Loading howitzers. In 1891 most of the intended armament was in place: fifteen 7-inch RBL consisting of ten guns in the emplacements on the main and south rampart with five guns in the Moncrieff Gun Pit, ten movable guns to cover the Fareham Gap consisting of four 4-inch B.L. on siege carriages and six 40 pdr. R.B.L on traveling carriages.

=== Later use (1902-1965) ===
By 1902 most of the land front forts were stood down as defensive structures and their armament, including that at Fort Fareham, was withdrawn. Fort Fareham then continued to serve as a barrack until the conclusion of the second world war. In 1905 the Portsmouth Fortress Defence Scheme called for the occupation of Fort Fareham, during the precautionary period, by forty four men of No. 23 Company Royal Garrison Artillery, and members of the 3rd. Battalion Oxfordshire Light Infantry Militia. They were to use the fort as a base to meet an attack from the west assuming that the enemy had captured or marched around Southampton. They were to be supplemented after mobilisation by three officers and sixty-six men from the 2nd Hampshire Royal Garrison Artillery (Volunteers). The 1st. Volunteer Brigade Hampshire Regiment were to provide men for administrative purposes only. Movable armament for use in the Fareham gap was stored at Fort Fareham. This consisted of four 15 pdr. B.L.s, and four 4-inch B.L.s and 40pdr. Rifled Muzzle Loading guns. In April 1907 the 108th (Heavy) Battery Royal Garrison Artillery was stationed at Fort Fareham. The 1st. Heavy Brigade was stationed at Fort Fareham by 1908. Sometime after 1900 stables, a harness room and vehicle shed were added to the parade adjacent to the west gun ramp.

In 1914 35th (Heavy) Battery of the 1st Heavy Brigade Royal Garrison Artillery was stationed at the fort. It deployed as part of the British Expeditionary Force, attached to the 2nd Division. VI and VII Siege Brigades Royal Garrison Artillery were raised there in December 1914.

During the Second World War, in 1941 Fort Fareham was used as Brigade headquarters for 124 Heavy Anti Aircraft Regiment, Royal Artillery and as headquarters for 410 battery, 45 Anti-Aircraft Brigade, 412 battery 65 Anti-Aircraft Brigade and 415 Battery 27th Anti-Aircraft Brigade, Royal Artillery. From 1928 to 1945 the Officers’ Mess served as the HQ for 35th Anti-Aircraft Brigade, Royal Artillery and Gun Operation Room.

From 1947/48 to 1957 it was reallocated for use as part of an Anti Aircraft Operations Room.

=== Disuse (1965-present) ===
The fort became surplus to requirements in 1965 when it was sold by the Ministry of Defence to Fareham Urban District Council. Shortly afterwards, in 1974, a contractor, acting for a property company which had leased the fort from Fareham Council, cleared the ramparts of vegetation by bulldozing it flat. All of the earth was stripped from the Haxo casemates, together with the earth forming the parapets and merlons, leaving the gun emplacements and expense magazines devoid of cover. One Haxo casemate was completely removed. The guard room and gateway were demolished together with the stables, sling wagon shed, movable armament shed, vehicle shed and portions of the parados before an injunction prevented further damage. The parade of the fort is entirely covered with Fort Fareham Business Park. The casemates are intact but have been converted to modern industrial units.

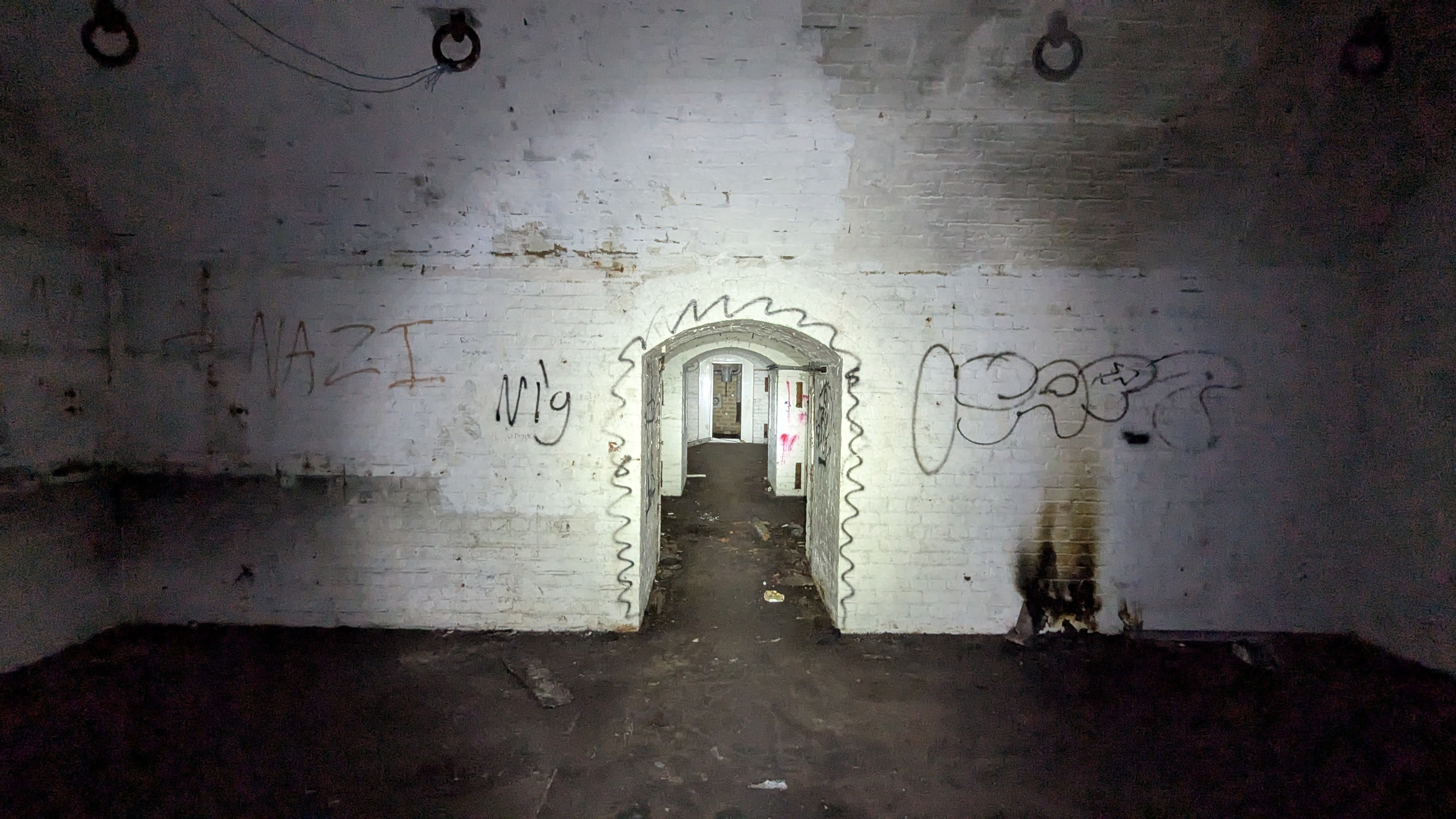
Main magazine in brick looking towards the entrance with a modern PVC door.

During the Cold War the main magazine and the adjacent south west caponier served for a brief period as Fareham Borough Emergency Centre to be used by the Council’s chosen few in the event of a nuclear attack. It was also to serve as part of 2 Group 10 Brigade Anti Aircraft Operations Room for the Portsmouth and Southampton Gun Defended Area. Today (in 2012) the ramparts are overgrown and inaccessible, the parapets and gun positions have been removed. The five Moncrieff pits are still extant. The range of Haxo casemates on the southwest and south ramparts are intact but bricked-up. The mortar battery and the caponiers are mostly derelict and overgrown with extensive damage to the brickwork. The main west caponier has suffered years of neglect resulting in extensive damage to its outer brickwork. A serious fire in 1989 caused considerable spalling to the interior roof arches. The gun embrasures, loopholes and sally ports have been blocked up to prevent access by vandals. The iron railings of the access bridge to the fort are still in place although the access road has been widened to two lanes by filling in the ditch parallel to the bridge. The ditch was partially cleared in the late 1980s by Fareham Council with volunteer help from people of the adjoining housing estate (Fort Fareham Conservationists, now disbanded). The surrounding wooded scarp, covered way and glacis now forms an area of wildground which seems to be managed by Fareham Council. A series of paths with seats at intervals provides a continuous walkway around the outer perimeter of the ditch.
