= RML 25-pounder 18 cwt =

RML 25-pounder 18 cwt gun
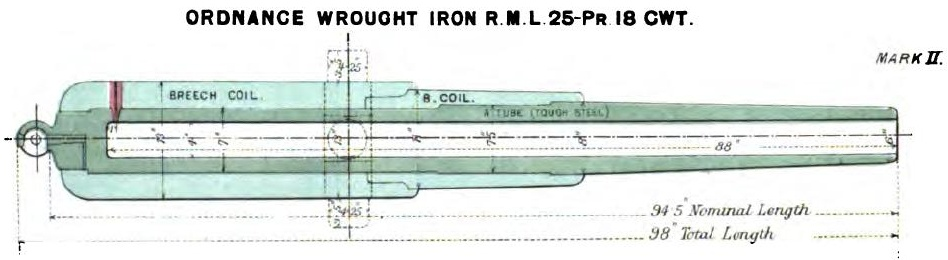
- 25-pounder (18 cwt) gun barrel
- Type: Heavy field gun Fortification gun
- Place of origin: United Kingdom

Service history
- Used by: British Empire

Production history
- Designed: Mk I : 1874
- Manufacturer: Royal Gun Factory
- Variants: Mark I only

Specifications
- Mass: Mk I (18cwt) : 2,016 pounds (914 kg)
- Barrel length: Mk I : 88 inches (2,200 mm) bore 22 Calibres
- Shell: 4 lb Rifled Large Grain (RLG) powder
- Calibre: 4 inches (102 mm)
- Action: RML
- Rate of fire: 1 round per minute
- Effective firing range: 4,000 yards
- Sights: Two side sights

The RML 25-pounder gun was a British rifled muzzle-loading light siege gun and gun of position designed in 1871. It was intended to be an intermediate gun between the 16-pounder and 40-pounder Rifled Muzzle Loading guns. It was part of a series of guns designed after the British military reverted to rifled muzzle-loading artillery until a more satisfactory breech-loading system than that of the Armstrong guns was developed.

== Description ==
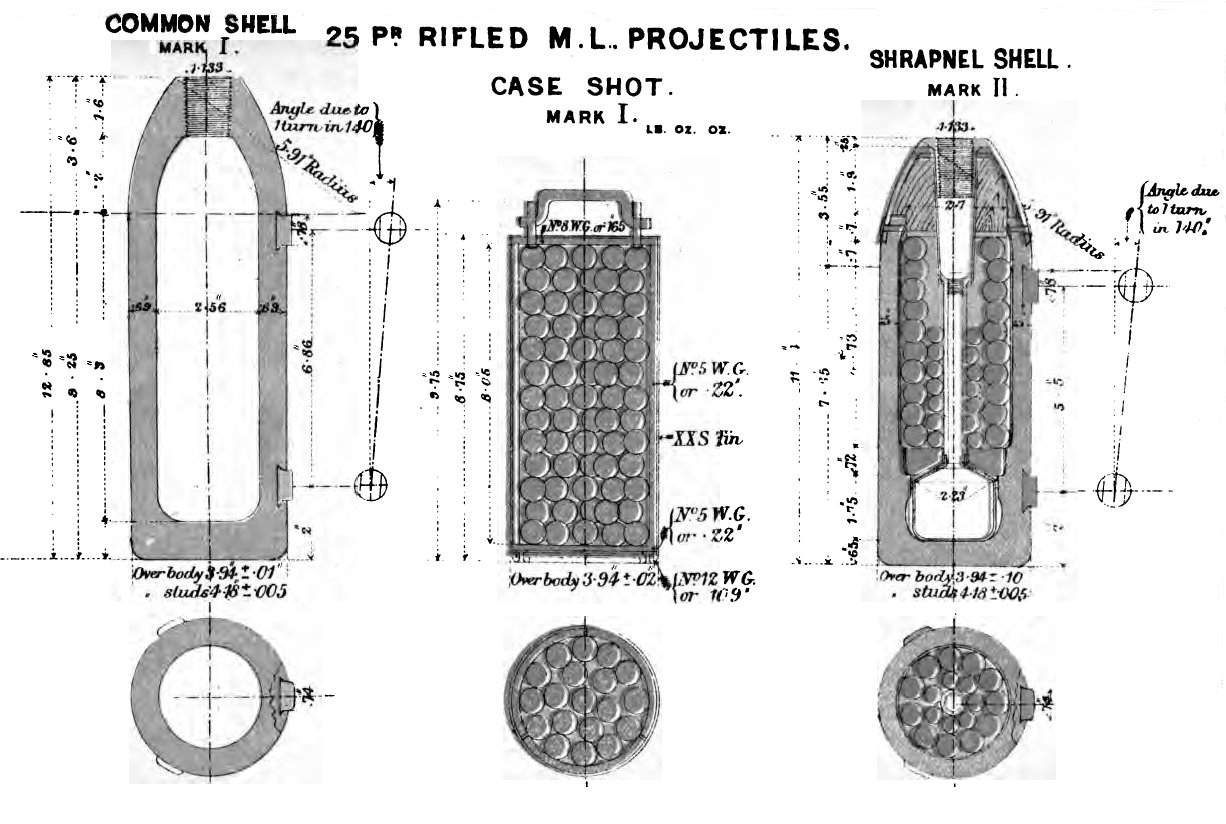
Ammunition for the 25-pounder RML

The gun consisted of a central toughened steel "A" tube surrounded by two wrought-iron coils. Rifling was the "Woolwich" pattern of three broad grooves, with a uniform twist of 1 turn in 35 calibres (i.e. in 166.25 inches).

They were mounted on semi-mobile field carriages, with limbers which enabled them to be moved and mounted in either field fortifications or permanent fortifications.

The guns used black powder charges in silk bags to fire three types of ammunition – common shell, shrapnel shell or case shot. A copper vent towards the end of the bore of the gun enabled friction tubes to be used to fire the gun.

== Service use ==
Six 25-pounder RML guns were transported from Malta and landed in Egypt in 1882 as part of a Royal Artillery Siege train formed for the Anglo-Egyptian War, however none of them were deployed in action.

The guns were also deployed at Forts and Batteries around Great Britain to form part of the fixed defences. Some were located at Fort Cumberland where they were used for training by the Royal Marine Artillery. They remained in service until 1902, by which time most had been dismounted and scrapped. A heavily rusted example is displayed at Fort Brockhurst in Hampshire.

== Bibliography ==
- Treatise on the Construction and Manufacture of Ordnance in the British Service. War Office, UK, 1877
- Text Book of Gunnery, 1887. LONDON : PRINTED FOR HIS MAJESTY'S STATIONERY OFFICE, BY HARRISON AND SONS, ST. MARTIN'S LANE
