= Fort Elson =

Palmerston Fort in Gosport, England

- Location within Hampshire
- 50°49′22″N 1°09′03″W
- Type: Palmerston Fort
- Location: Gosport
- OS grid reference: SU 59902 02893

History
- Built: 1855–1860

Site notes
- Area: Hampshire
- Architect: William Crossman
- Owner: Ministry of Defence

Scheduled monument
- Official name: Fort Elson, Gosport
- Reference no.: 1001841

Fort Elson was one of the early Palmerston Forts, in Gosport, England, the northernmost polygonal land fort in the defence line to the west of Gosport. It was located on land immediately to the south of Elson Creek, to which it was connected by a sluice. Fort Elson was the most northerly fort in the line of five which formed part of the ‘Sea Front and Spithead Defences’, Inner Line, Land Front, and Left Flank. This line of forts was later known as the Gomer-Elson Line or 'Gosport Advanced Line' This consisted of, from south to north, Fort Gomer, Fort Grange, Fort Rowner, Fort Brockhurst and Fort Elson. Work began on Fort Elson in 1855. The estimated cost of Fort Elson was £63,740 with the actual cost £61,180.

== Construction ==
Fort Elson was commenced in 1855 and completed in 1860. Fort Elson was already in existence when the Royal Commission on the Defence of the United Kingdom decided to complete the line of fortifications to the west of Gosport inner defences so technically it is neither a Palmerston Fort nor a Royal Commission Fort. The Commission decided to incorporate Fort Elson and Fort Gomer into the defences by adding three identical forts between them to form the Gosport Advanced Line. The method of construction was to build brick arches, similar to a railway viaduct, forming the main ramparts and then to pour earth on top allowing this to fall back through the arches, allowing it to be carried away a returned to the top once more, until the whole of the scarp rested upon their ends. The parapet was supported by the arches. This method was known as 'escarp en décharge'. It proved difficult and during the construction a major portion of the escarp slipped into the ditch during one night.

== Layout ==
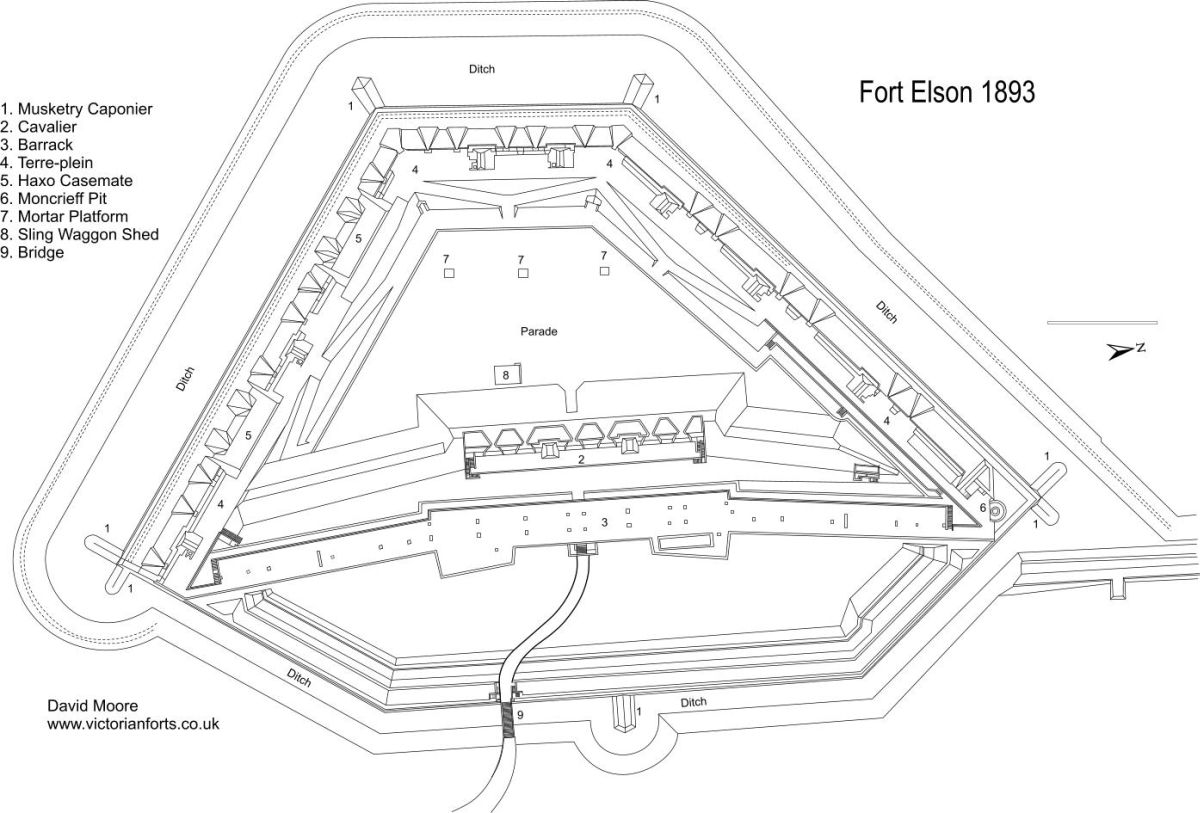
Fort Elson top plan 1893

The fort consists of a D-shaped rampart for the main armament with the rear (or gorge) closed by a barrack block. This is surrounded by a wet ditch, and although it proved difficult to retain water in half of it, a sluice was built to connect the northern section to Fareham Creek (part of Portsmouth Harbour). The front face is a short one with two long flanks, all three having earth ramps up which the main armament and supplementary movable armament could be moved into position. The main magazine is beneath the salient of the front face and left flank accessed by a tunnel from the central parade.

The barrack block had accommodation for one field officer, eleven officers and three hundred and two N.C.O.s and men. There were stables for two horses. In front of the barrack a cavalier held a second line of armament but this was disarmed and the embrasures filled during the modifications of the ramparts of all of the Gomer-Elson line of forts in 1892. Access to the fort is over a drawbridge spanning the rear ditch, then through a tunnel in the centre of the barrack block and finally through a second tunnel in the centre of the cavalier to the parade beyond. More barrack rooms are to be found beneath the north flank of the fort.

== Armament ==
The fort was first armed with four 10-inch, six 8-inch, 10 68prs and 8 32prs, all smooth bore guns. By 1886 this had been revised to eighteen 7-inch R.B.L. guns with three 13-inch mortars mounted on parade on purpose built platforms. At this time it was proposed to remove four of the 7-inch R.B.L. guns and to add four 4-inch B.L. guns with six 40pr R.B.L. guns as moveable armament. In 1891 the armament mounted was eleven 7-inch R.B.L. guns on ordinary sliding carriages with three 7-inch R.B.L. guns on Moncrieff Disappearing mountings. This was supplemented by two machine guns. In 1900 it was proposed to remove all remaining armament and by 1901 the fort served no further purpose in the defence line.

== In use ==
The armament of the fort was maintained during its active period by various companies from the Garrison Artillery, as were all of the Gosport Forts, the H.Q. being in Fort Rowner. It was also used by The Royal Artillery Militia during its annual 28-day embodiments in the years from 1853 to 1894.

In 1917 the fort was given a new lease of life when an early QF 3 inch 20 cwt anti-aircraft gun on a Peerless lorry was stationed there. During the Second World War the magazines were used to store depth charges and torpedoes.

== Present day ==
Fort Elson is still within the boundary of the armament depôt at Bedenham, Gosport and is inaccessible to the general public. It is in a serious state of endangerment and is unlikely to be maintained or restored due to an English Heritage policy of 'Controlled Ruination' Fort Elson is a Scheduled Monument It is on the Historic England 'Buildings At Risk register'

== Publications ==
- Moore, David (1990). Fort Brockhurst and the Gomer-Elson Forts. Gosport: Solent Papers. ISBN 0951323431.
