= DM Gosport =

Defence munitions site

Coordinates: 50.825026°N 1.149150°W

- Gosport, Hampshire, England
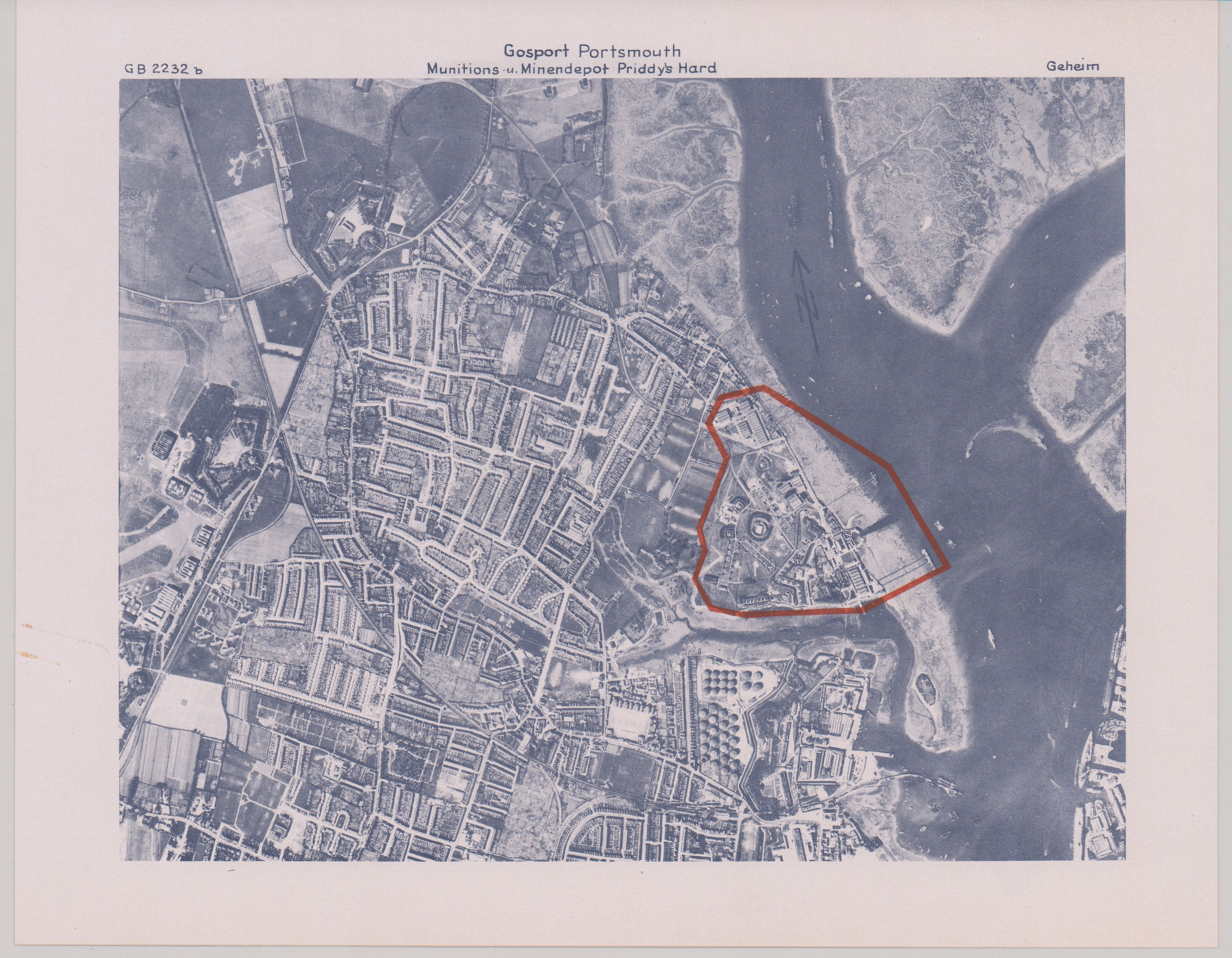
- DM Gosport on a target dossier of the German Luftwaffe, 1930s

Site information
- Type: munitions site
- Owner: Ministry of Defence (Defence Equipment and Support)
- Operator: Royal Navy (1908-1997); Ministry of Defence (Since 1997)
- Condition: Operational

Location
- Location in Hampshire

Site history
- In use: 1855-1901 (fort); 1908-1977 (satellite depots); 1977-present (primary depot)

Defence Munitions Gosport is a defence munitions site situated on the southwestern shores of Portsmouth harbour, in Gosport, Hampshire, England. The site occupies about 470 acres. Its facilities include two Integrated Weapon Complexes (IWCs), 24 processing rooms and 26 explosives stores. The site employs some 270 staff.

The site is often used to supply munitions for ships at HMNB Portsmouth, which is on the other side of the harbour. Bedenham Pier, a jetty within the site, is used to unload munitions onto lighters, which carry munitions to the other side or the UHAF facility.

Fort Elson lies within the boundary of the establishment.

== History ==
=== Origins (1855-1950) ===
Fort Elson was built on the site in 1855, to defend Gosport and Portsmouth amid fears of a French invasion at the time. As it was constructed before the Royal Commission of 1859, it is technically not a Palmerston fort, although it served as the blueprint for the adjacent line of Palmerston forts which were constructed in the following years. Elson is the only fort within the boundaries of the modern munitions site, however. A French invasion never occurred, and so the forts never came into use for the intended purpose. Elson was disarmed from 1901. Three satellite munitions depots (Elson, Frater and Bedenham) were constructed as individual installations on the site from 1908 until the early 1920s. These were intended to support the existing Navy arms depot at Priddy's Hard to the southeast. RNAD Bedenham stored explosives such as cordite, linked by a railway system from 1913 and a pier from 1915. Fort Elson and adjacent facilities were used for magazine storage from the early 1920s, with the structure still remaining on the site.

=== 1950 explosions ===
On 14 July 1950, ammunition was being loaded onto a lighter at Bedenham Pier. At 18:45 an ammunition explosion occurred, which started a fire and exploded a second boat at 19:15. Around 1,000 tons of ammunition was detonated in the incident, although the quantity has been estimated to be as high as 5,000 tons. The pier was badly damaged, nine barges were sunk and property damage occurred in the wider district. The roof of Cams Hall was torn off, one mile away from the site of the explosions. The accident caused 19 injuries, 14 of which were civilians. Firefighters had the blaze under control by 22:30.

At the time of the incident, sabotage was suspected due to several other incidents in the preceding months involving other vessels. This investigation would later include the unrelated explosion of the RFA Bedenham, a ship docked in Gibraltar which exploded in early 1951. There was, however, no evidence of sabotage at Gosport that emerged after subsequent investigations.

=== Later years under the Royal Navy (1950-1997) ===
Bedenham received repairs after the disaster, and developed over time. It became a repair facility for guided missiles in the 1960s. In the mid-1970s it gained a pair of cruciform Integrated Weapons Complexes, in which missiles, torpedoes and other weapons were assembled and tested. The modern depot was formed in 1977 after Priddy's Hard was decommissioned, with the transfer completed in 1988. The move established the Royal Naval Armament Depot Gosport as a merger of the three smaller facilities. In 1997 RNAD Gosport was moved under the jurisdiction of the Ministry of Defence as DM Gosport.
