= Fort Gomer =

Ford Gomer
- Part of Gomer-Elson Line/Gosport Advanced Line
- Gosport, Hampshire
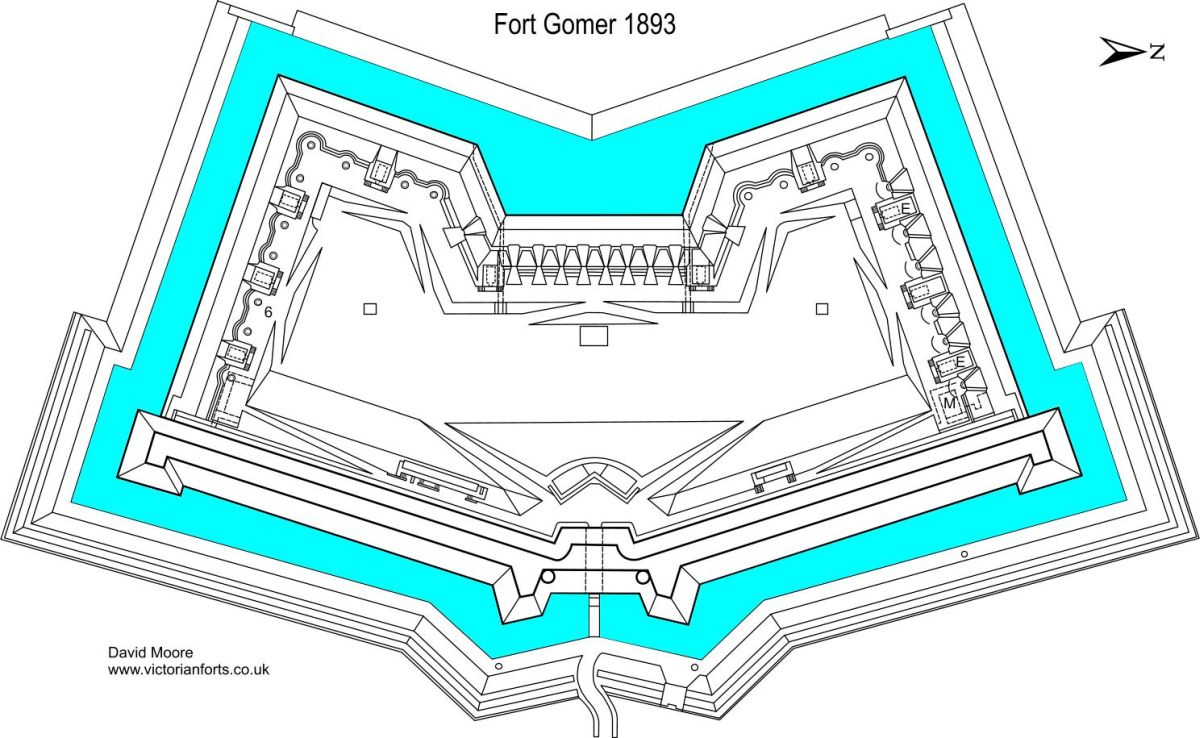
- Plan of the fort in 1893

Site information
- Type: Polygonal fort
- Condition: Demolished

Location
- Location within Hampshire
- Coordinates: 50°47′28″N 1°09′54″W

Site history
- Built: 1853-1858
- In use: 1858–1953
- Battles/wars: World War II

Fort Gomer was one of the Palmerston Forts, in Gosport, England, the southernmost and first-built Polygonal fort in the defence line to the west of Gosport. It was located on land immediately to the west of the present Gomer Lane. Fort Gomer was the most southerly fort in the line of five which formed part of the ‘Sea Front and Spithead Defences’, Inner Line, Land Front, Left Flank. This line of forts was later known as the Gomer-Elson Line or 'Gosport Advanced Line' This consisted of, from south to north, Fort Gomer, Fort Grange, Fort Rowner, Fort Brockhurst and Fort Elson. An inscription above the main entrance through the barrack block read `Erected AD 1853’. The fort was almost complete before work began on Fort Elson in 1855. The estimated cost of Fort Gomer was £92,000 in 1869.

== Construction and layout ==
Fort Gomer was constructed between 1853 and 1858 and as such it was the first of the Polygonal land forts based on the Prussian System of mutual defence. It was unique and an example of early attempts to break away from the old bastioned system of fortification. Fort Gomer had a wet moat surrounding it and provision was made to further hinder the enemy by flooding the ground in front of the rampart. It was nearly 500 feet wide and 800 feet long, its rear faced east and consisted of a defensible barracks, built in the shape of a shallow V. Two spiral staircases gave access to the roof of the barrack block. There is a possibility that the intention was to mount guns on the roof of the barrack, using it as a cavalier, but this was never done. Mortars were to be mounted on the central parade. on the ramparts between the gun emplacements were ten expense magazines for the storage of ready use ammunition for the guns. A main magazine were situated at each end of the barrack block. Two bastionettes at the northwest and southwest corners of the west ditch provided musketry fire along the north and south branches of the ditch. Two tunnels led from the parade through the thickness of the west rampart to the west ditch in order to provide flanking fire across the faces of the rampart.

== Barrack block ==
In 1861 accommodation was provided in the barrack block for 1 field officer, 10 officers, 2 NCOs, 332 privates with 1 master gunner, 1 barrack sergeant, 1 hospital sergeant, 5 servants. Also provided was a hospital for 8 patients and its own kitchen. By 1893 this had been re-appropriated for 1 Field Officer, 7 officers, 2 unmarried NCOs and 310 gunners with separate accommodation for 4 married NCOs and men.

== Armament ==
The main armament of the fort was placed on two west facing earth bastions with a central curtain providing more guns firing through embrasures. Flanking fire for ditch defence was provided for musketry only. Two bastionettes were placed on the far side of the wet ditch, one at each shoulder. Two more flanking galleries fired across the faces of the curtain and bastions.

The plans of 1862 list the armament of Fort Gomer as:

- 9 × 68-pdr. 95 cwt guns
- 5 × 10-inch 85 cwt guns
- 7 × 8-inch 65 cwt guns
- 9 × 32-pdr. guns
- 2 × 13-inch mortars.

By 1872 it was proposed to withdraw most of the smoothbore guns and provided twenty 7-inch rifled muzzleloaders.

In 1886 the armament mounted appears to be twenty 7-inch R.M.L.s and two 13-inch mortars. It was then proposed to change this to eleven 7-inch R.B.L.s with six 64-pdr. R.M.L.s and two 13-inch mortars.

The fort was modified early on to remedy shortcomings in its method of mounting guns, barbette positions being substituted for some of the embrasures on the flanks. In 1891 the mounted armament was:

- North Bastion 64pr 58 cwt RML guns 5 and 6
- South Bastion 64pr 58 cwt RML guns 9, 10 and 11
- Right Face 7-inch RBL (rifled breech-loading) guns 1, 2 & 3
- Curtain 7-inch RBL guns 7 & 8
- Left Face 7-inch RBL guns 12, 13 and 14

== The fort in use ==
Throughout the Victorian period the fort was used mainly as barracks and as a training establishment. It was disarmed in 1901. It then briefly saw service as a training facility once more in preparing troops for the Boer War and the First World War trenches. The 3rd Field Training Regiment Royal Artillery was stationed at the fort during 1939. A Canadian unit, The Fort Garry Horse occupied the fort in 1943/4 with its 'A' and headquarters squadrons for amphibious assault training. The 1st Hussars (6th Armoured Regiment) moved to Fort Gomer on 4 March 1944 in preparation for the D-Day landings. The Specialised Armour Development Establishment (SADE), also used Fort Gomer to undertake work on amphibious fighting vehicles until at least September 1946.

After the war the 7th Royal Tank Regiment was based at the fort in the 1950s, leaving in 1953. Briefly in 1953 the fort was occupied by the Royal Army Ordnance Corps Boys Training School and the fort was eventually released in 1964. It was sold at auction for £169,000 and a Fareham firm demolished it to provide land for housing. Nothing of it remains.

== Publications ==
- Moore, David (1990). Fort Brockhurst and the Gomer-Elson Forts. Gosport: Solent Papers. ISBN 0951323431.
