= Gosport bus station =

Bus station in Hampshire, England

Coordinates: 50.7940°N 1.1179°W

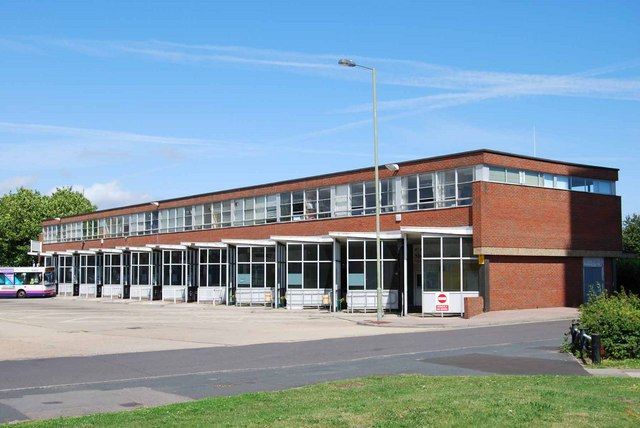

General information
- Location: Gosport; Hampshire; England
- Owner: Hampshire County Council
- Bus stands: 10
- Bus operators: First Hampshire & Dorset

History
- Opened: 1972
Location

Gosport bus station is a bus station in Gosport, England.

== History ==
The original Gosport bus station was opened in 1972 with 10 stands. There have been plans to redevelop the bus station since 2012. Current proposals involve building a new bus station north of the current station, on the site of a taxi rank. In 2021, the site of the current bus station was put up for sale.

In June 2023 work commenced on a new bus station with six stands with the original station to be demolished as part of the Gosport Waterfront redevelopment. It was completed in late 2024 and started running a few months later.
