= Gosport =

Coastal town in Hampshire, England

- Town and non-metropolitan borough
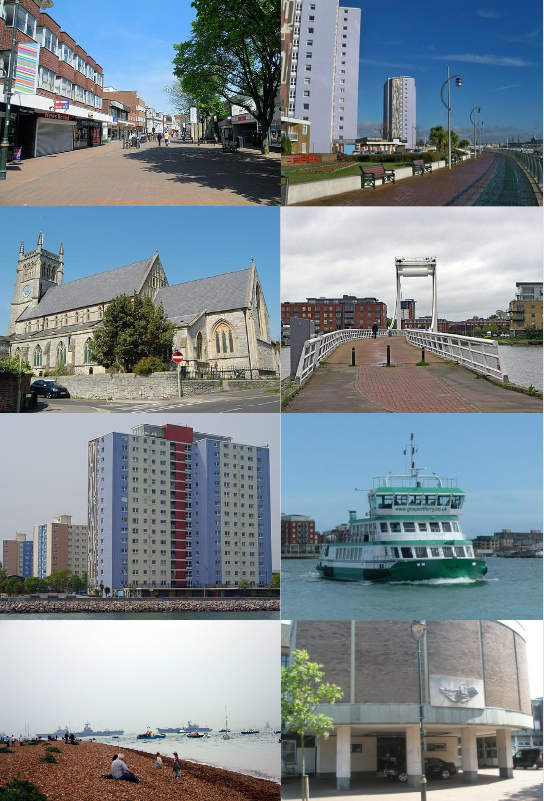
- Clockwise from top left: The High Street, The Esplanade, The Millennium Footbridge over Forton Lake, The Gosport Ferry which links the town with Portsmouth, Gosport Town Hall, Stokes Bay, High-rise flats, and St Mary's Church.

- Shown within Hampshire

- Location within the United Kingdom Location within England Location in Europe
- Coordinates: 50.79°N 1.12°W
- Sovereign state: United Kingdom
- Country: England
- Region: South East England
- Ceremonial county: Hampshire

Government
  - Type: non-metropolitan borough
  - Governing body: Gosport Borough Council
  - Leadership: Leader & Cabinet
  - Council control: Liberal Democrat
  - Member of Parliament: Caroline Dinenage (C)

Area
  - Total: 9.76 sq mi (25.29 km^{2})

Population (2021)
  - Total: 81,952

Ethnicity (2021)
  - Ethnic groups: List: 95.3% White; 1.5% Mixed; 1.4% Asian; 1.2% Black; 0.5% other

Religion (2021)
  - Religion: List: 48.4% no religion; 44.6% Christianity; 5.1% not stated; 0.5% other; 0.5% Islam; 0.2% Buddhism; 0.2% Hinduism; 0.1% Judaism; 0.1% Sikhism
- Time zone: UTC+0 (GMT)
  - Summer (DST): UTC+1 (Wednesday 8:30 am)
- Postal code: PO12 - PO13
- Area code: 023
- Police: Hampshire and Isle of Wight
- Ambulance: South Central
- Fire: Hampshire and Isle of Wight
- Website: www.gosport.gov.uk

Gosport (/ˈɡɒspɔːrt/ GOS-port) is a town and non-metropolitan district with borough status in Hampshire, England. At the 2021 Census, the town had a population of 70,131 and the district had a population of 81,952. Gosport is situated on a peninsula on the western side of Portsmouth Harbour, opposite the city of Portsmouth, to which it is linked by the Gosport Ferry.

Until the last quarter of the 20th century, Gosport was a major naval town associated with the defence and supply infrastructure of His Majesty's Naval Base (HMNB) Portsmouth. As such over the years extensive fortifications were created. Gosport is still home to HMS Sultan and a Naval Armament Supply Facility, as well as a helicopter repair base.

As part of the Renaissance of Portsmouth Harbour Millennium project, a large sundial, known as the Millennium Timespace, was installed on the harbour front in 2000. Alongside this sundial, a long meandering path of designed paving stones can be found, known as the Millennium Path; this can also be seen across the Solent in Portsmouth.

== Name ==
Though there are multiple theories which point towards the etymology of Gosport, it was widely purported to derive its name from "goose". An alternative etymology of "gorse" (from the bushes growing on local heathland) is not supported by the regional name for the plant, "furze". A third theory, nowadays the most popular theory, claims a derivation from "God's Port" which is believed to be a 19th-century invention. This is, however, the slogan of Gosport as demonstrated on its emblem. It is most likely that is the reason.

== Geography ==
The Town area of the Borough, including Newtown, consists of the High Street, Stoke Road shopping area, Walpole Park, Royal Clarence Yard and three modern marinas: Royal Clarence, Gosport Marina and Haslar Marina.

South of the centre is Haslar Creek, which flows into Portsmouth Harbour near the harbour mouth. The lowest part of Haslar Creek is called Haslar Lake; at its western end, the creek splits into two branches. These are called Workhouse Lake (the northern branch) and Stoke Lake (the southern branch). South East of Stoke Lake and along Gilkicker Point is the area of Clayhall.

West, Northwest and South of Stoke Lake is the district and village of Alverstoke. To the west of which is Browndown, where the River Alver flows into The Solent at Stokes Bay. Further west from Browndown point is the district of Lee-on-the-Solent with the former RNAS Daedalus which is now home to the Hovercraft Museum and several marine related businesses, and CEMAST College (Fareham College). It is also used as a base for glider clubs, light aeroplanes, HM Coastguard heliport and police aircraft.

In the west of Gosport is the naval base HMS Sultan. West of Sultan is the district of Rowner, which includes Alver Village.

There are several districts north, northwest and west of the town centre. These include areas that extend to the inland areas of the peninsula, Hardway (including Priddy's Hard and Forton Lake) Elson, Brockhurst, Bridgemary and Rowner. Hoeford (A32 Gosport Road) is the most northwesterly area within Gosport, and ends at the boundary with the Borough of Fareham.

=== Climate ===
The climate of Gosport is milder than that of the surrounding areas, winter frosts being light and short-lived and snow quite rare. Temperatures rarely drop much below freezing, because the peninsula has water to the south and east. Portsdown Hill also protects the town from the cold northerly winds during the winter months. Located on the south coast, Gosport also receives more sunshine per annum than most of the UK. The average maximum temperature in January is 9 °C (48 °F) with the average minimum being 4 °C (39 °F). The average maximum temperature in July is 22 °C (72 °F), with the average minimum being 15 °C (59 °F). Until 2026, the record high temperature was 32 °C (90 °F). A new June temperature record for the UK of 36.1 °C (97.0 °F) was provisionally set in Gosport on the afternoon of Wednesday 24 June 2026, which broke a longstanding UK record from the 1976 European heatwave. The record low is −9 °C (16 °F). The provisional record was surpassed the following day.

The Met Office has a weather station at the M.R.S.C. in Lee-on-the-Solent.

Climate data for Solent MRSC 1991–2020, rainy days 1981-2010
Month	Jan	Feb	Mar	Apr	May	Jun	Jul	Aug	Sep	Oct	Nov	Dec	Year
Mean daily maximum °C (°F)	8.6 (47.5)	8.7 (47.7)	11.0 (51.8)	13.9 (57.0)	17.1 (62.8)	19.6 (67.3)	21.6 (70.9)	21.6 (70.9)	19.4 (66.9)	15.7 (60.3)	11.9 (53.4)	9.2 (48.6)	14.9 (58.8)
Mean daily minimum °C (°F)	3.8 (38.8)	3.4 (38.1)	4.8 (40.6)	6.6 (43.9)	9.5 (49.1)	12.4 (54.3)	14.5 (58.1)	14.6 (58.3)	12.4 (54.3)	9.8 (49.6)	6.6 (43.9)	4.3 (39.7)	8.6 (47.4)
Average precipitation mm (inches)	73.9 (2.91)	52.3 (2.06)	45.4 (1.79)	41.5 (1.63)	41.1 (1.62)	48.3 (1.90)	48.3 (1.90)	55.7 (2.19)	53.3 (2.10)	83.4 (3.28)	90.8 (3.57)	89.6 (3.53)	723.6 (28.48)
Average rainy days	11.6	9.6	8.3	8.3	7.1	6.9	7.0	7.3	8.7	10.5	11.2	12.2	108.7
Source: UK Met Office

== History ==
The Rowner area of the peninsula was settled by the Anglo-Saxons, and is mentioned in the Anglo Saxon Chronicle as Rughenor ("rough bank or slope"). Both Rowner and Alverstoke, the name coming from the point where the River Alver entered the Solent at Stokes Bay, were included in the Domesday Book. Rowner was the earliest known settlement of the peninsula, with many Mesolithic finds and a hunting camp being found, and tumuli on the peninsula investigated. Bronze Age items found in a 1960s construction in HMS Sultan included a hoard of axe heads and torcs. A three-celled dwelling unearthed during construction of the Rowner naval Estate in the 1970s points to a settled landscape. Next to the River Alver which passes the southern and western edge of Rowner is a Norman motte and bailey, the first fortification of the peninsula, giving a vantage point over the Solent, Stokes Bay, Lee-on-the-Solent and the Isle of Wight.

Gosport Town Hall, designed by W. H. Saunders and Sons, was completed in 1964.

The former Rowner naval married quarters estate, now mostly demolished, and HMS Sultan were built on a former military airfield, known first as RAF Gosport and later as HMS Siskin, which gives its name to the local infant and junior schools. The barracks at Browndown (Stokes Bay) were used in the ITV series Bad Lads' Army.

== Government and politics ==
The borough is administered by Gosport Borough Council.

In the House of Commons, Gosport has been represented by Caroline Dinenage of the Conservative Party since 2010.

In March 2026, the government announced that it would abolish the borough in 2028 as part of local government reform across Hampshire. These proposals were withdrawn in September 2026.

== Naval and military ==
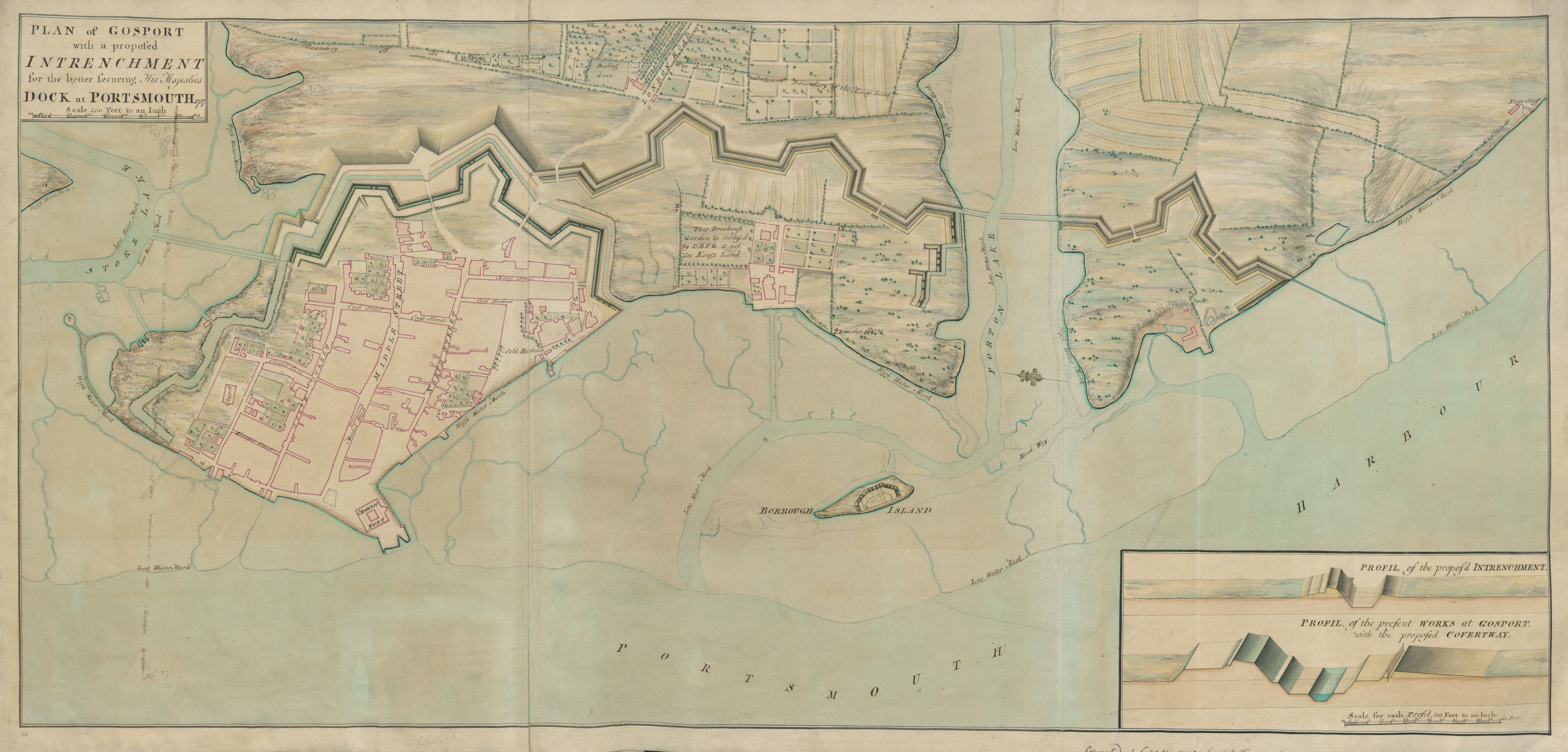
Map of Gosport (1757) showing the fortifications around the town (left) and their proposed extension to cover the sites of the future Royal Clarence Yard (centre) and Priddy's Hard (right).

Until the last quarter of the 20th century, Gosport was a major naval town associated with the defence and supply infrastructure of His Majesty's Naval Base (HMNB) Portsmouth. As such over the years extensive fortifications were created.

The first fortifications were in 1678 during the reign of Charles II. These consisted of two forts, Fort James and Fort Charles, and a series of bastions and double ditches to encircle the town, known as the Gosport Lines. During the Georgian period in 1751 and 1752 they were rebuilt, enlarged and extended. Further additions were made in response to the French invasion threat of 1779. By 1860, the Gosport Lines had 58 guns. No.1 Bastion had mounted 14 guns in brick lined emplacements firing over the parapet. The 1859 Royal Commission on the Defences of the United Kingdom proposed the completion of a line of forts to protect the outer approach to Gosport town, making the earlier defences redundant. However, they were retained to constrain any expansion of the town towards the new line of forts. From the 1890s road widening meant some parts of the ramparts and gates were demolished. Further sections were demolished in the 1920s and 1960s. Today, the little that remain are protected ancient monuments.

The town is home to HMS Sultan and a Naval Armament Supply Facility as well as a Helicopter Repair base; the town has several buildings of historic interest as well as connections with people who became famous. Most of the former naval and military installations have closed since the Second World War, leaving empty sites and buildings. In response to this, museums have opened, and fortifications and installations (such as Fort Brockhurst, Priddy's Hard (formerly an Armament Depot, now the Explosion! Museum of Naval Firepower) and the Royal Navy Submarine Museum in Haslar Road) have been opened to the public as tourism and heritage sites. One of the more recent additions is the Diving Museum at No 2 Battery at Stokes Bay which is bidding to become the National Diving Museum for the British Isles.

Several sites have also been redeveloped to provide housing, including the New Barracks (opened 1859, renamed St George Barracks in 1947, having served as HMS St George during the Second World War; closed 1991), the Royal Clarence Victualling Yard (opened 1828 on the site of an earlier victualling facility, closed 1992) and Royal Hospital Haslar (formerly the last military hospital of the UK: opened as a Royal Naval Hospital in 1753, later served other armed forces personnel and latterly the wider community of Gosport; closed as a military hospital in March 2007, the NHS withdrew in 2009 and the hospital closed). Forton Barracks (opened 1811, closed 1923, re-opened as HMS St Vincent in 1923, closed 1969) was part-demolished and is now St Vincent College.

There has also been extensive redevelopment of the harbour area as a marina.

=== Graves of Turkish sailors 1850–51 ===
In November 1850, two ships of the Ottoman Navy, Mirat-ı Zafer and Sürağ-ı Bahri Briki, anchored off the Hardway near Gosport. The visit lasted several months and during this time some of the members of the crew contracted cholera and were admitted to Haslar Hospital for treatment, where most of them died. In addition, some other sailors died because of training accidents. In total 26 died and were laid to rest in the grounds of Haslar. At the turn of the 20th century the bodies were exhumed and transferred to the R.N. Military Cemetery, Clayhall Road, in Alverstoke.

=== Preparations for the D Day Landings ===
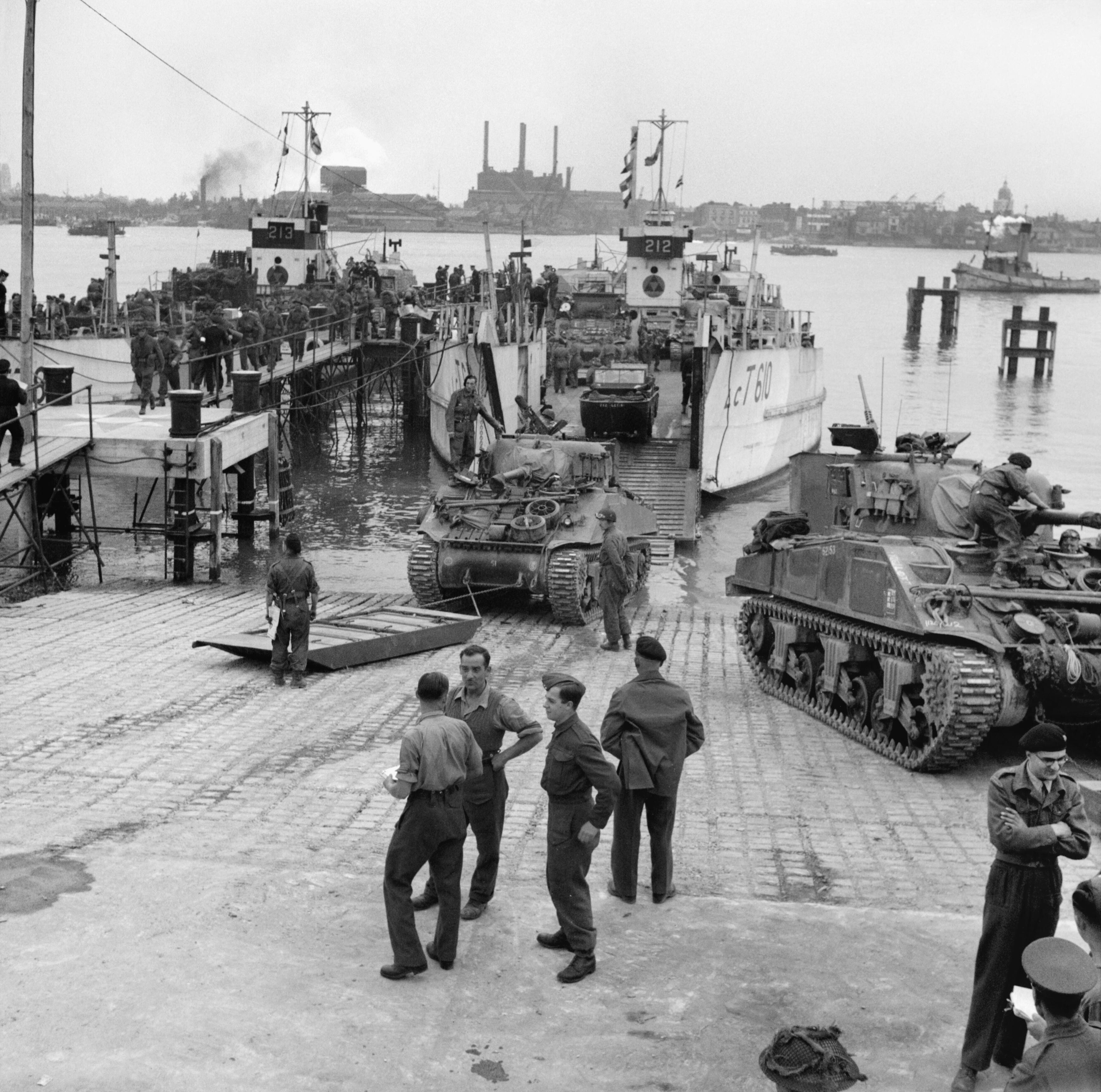
Sherman tanks of the 13th/18th Hussars, embarking onto LCT-610, 3 June 1944

In the first week of June 1944, tanks, scout cars and wheeled vehicles of the Sherbrooke Fusilier Regiment, Canadian Army loaded Landing craft tanks in Gosport. Convoys of vehicles had been carefully concealed from German discovery in the areas further inland, and in daylight on 3 June moved through Titchfield and Stubbington to G3 Hard on the Gosport waterfront. There, the M4 Sherman tanks were backed into position in preparation for the Channel crossing. The initial plan was for the invasion to begin on 5 June, but bad weather, with the various vessels riding at anchor off Calshot in the Solent, delayed the plans by one day.

=== Gallery of historic buildings ===
==== Naval ====
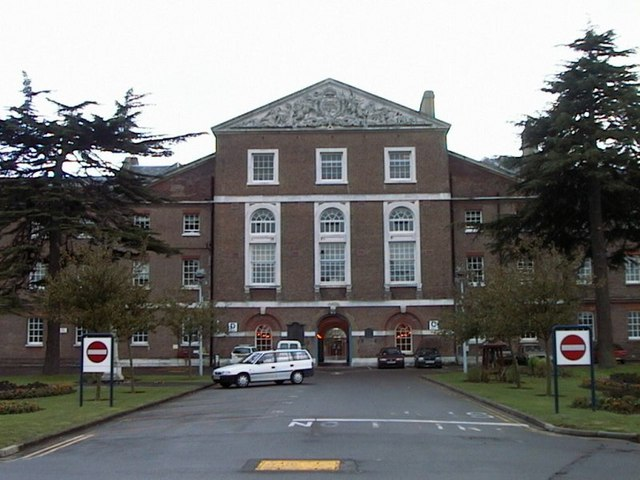
Royal Naval Hospital, Haslar

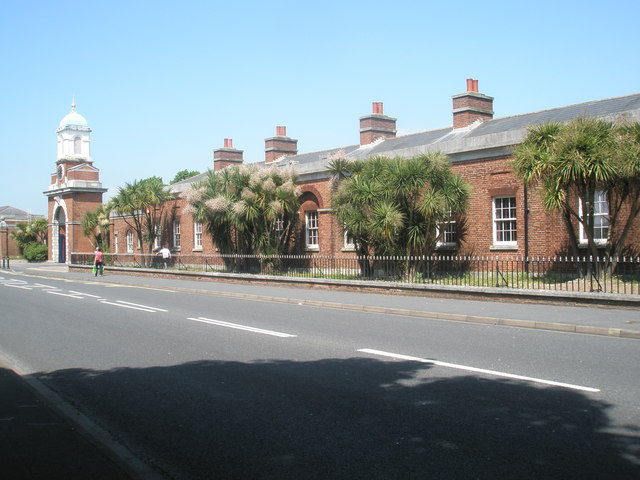
Forton Barracks (Royal Marine Light Infantry; later HMS St Vincent)

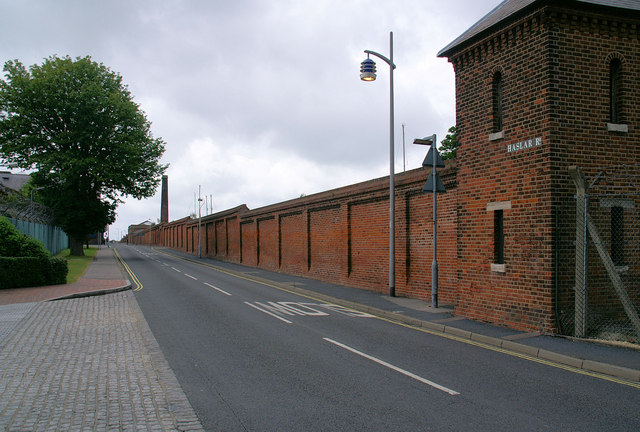
Haslar Gunboat Yard and Admiralty Experimental Works (perimeter wall)

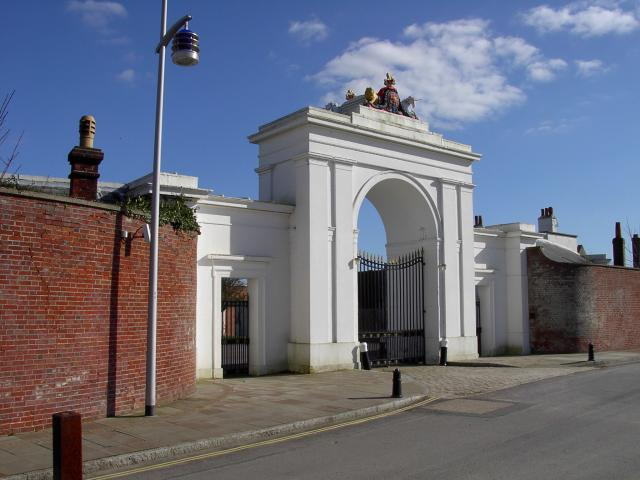
Gate to the Royal Clarence Victualling Yard

Gate to the Royal Clarence Victualling Yards under Maintenance, 2019.

Offices & Storehouse, Royal Naval Armaments Depot, Priddy's Hard (2019)

==== Military ====
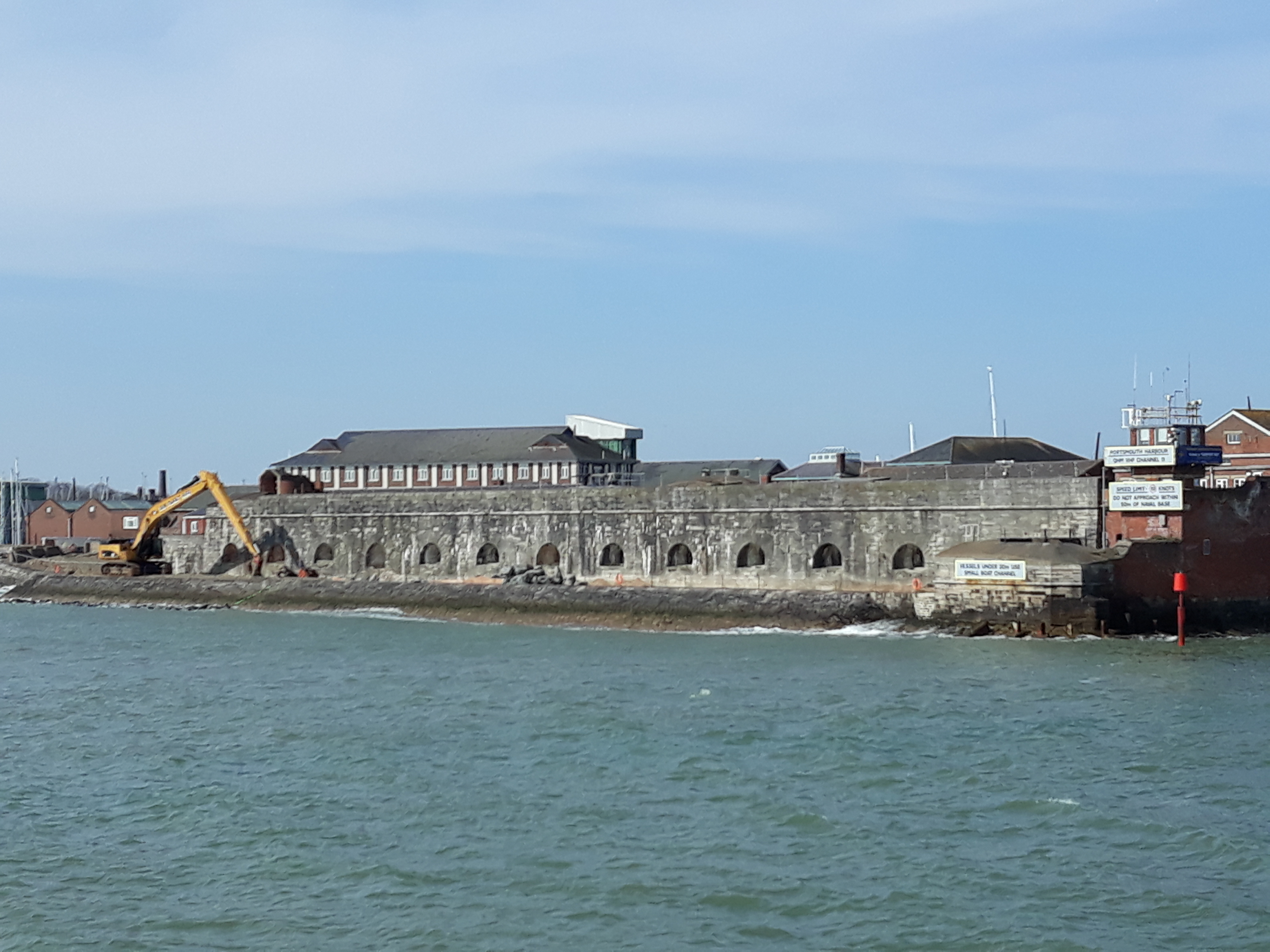
Fort Blockhouse

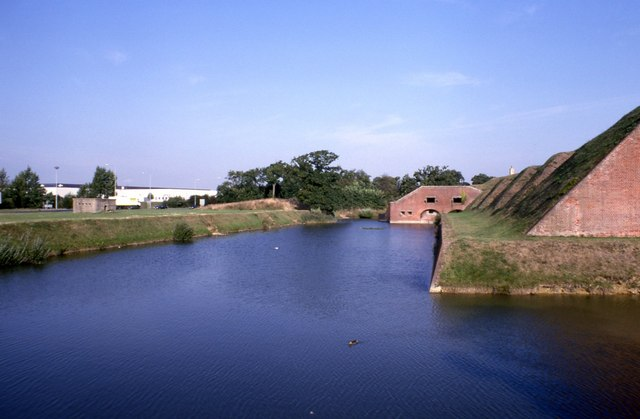
Fort Brockhurst, moat

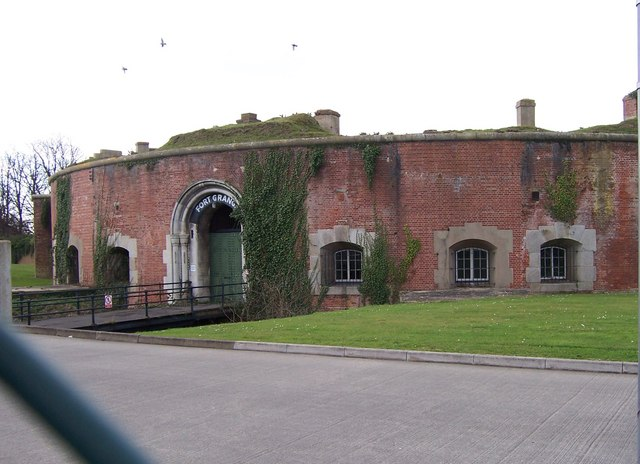
Fort Grange

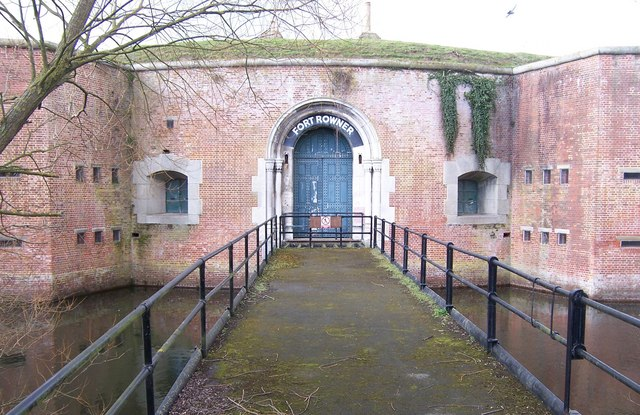
Fort Rowner, entrance

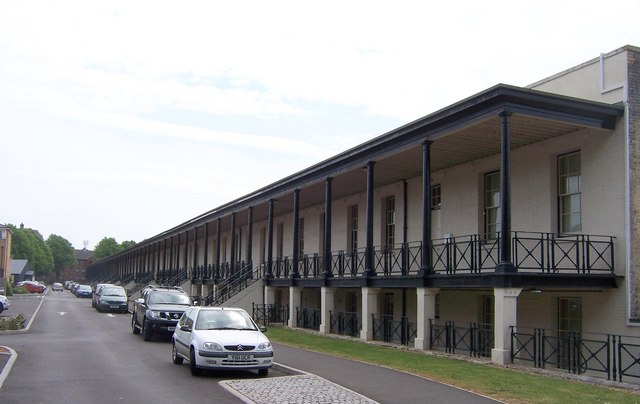
St George Barracks (Infantry)

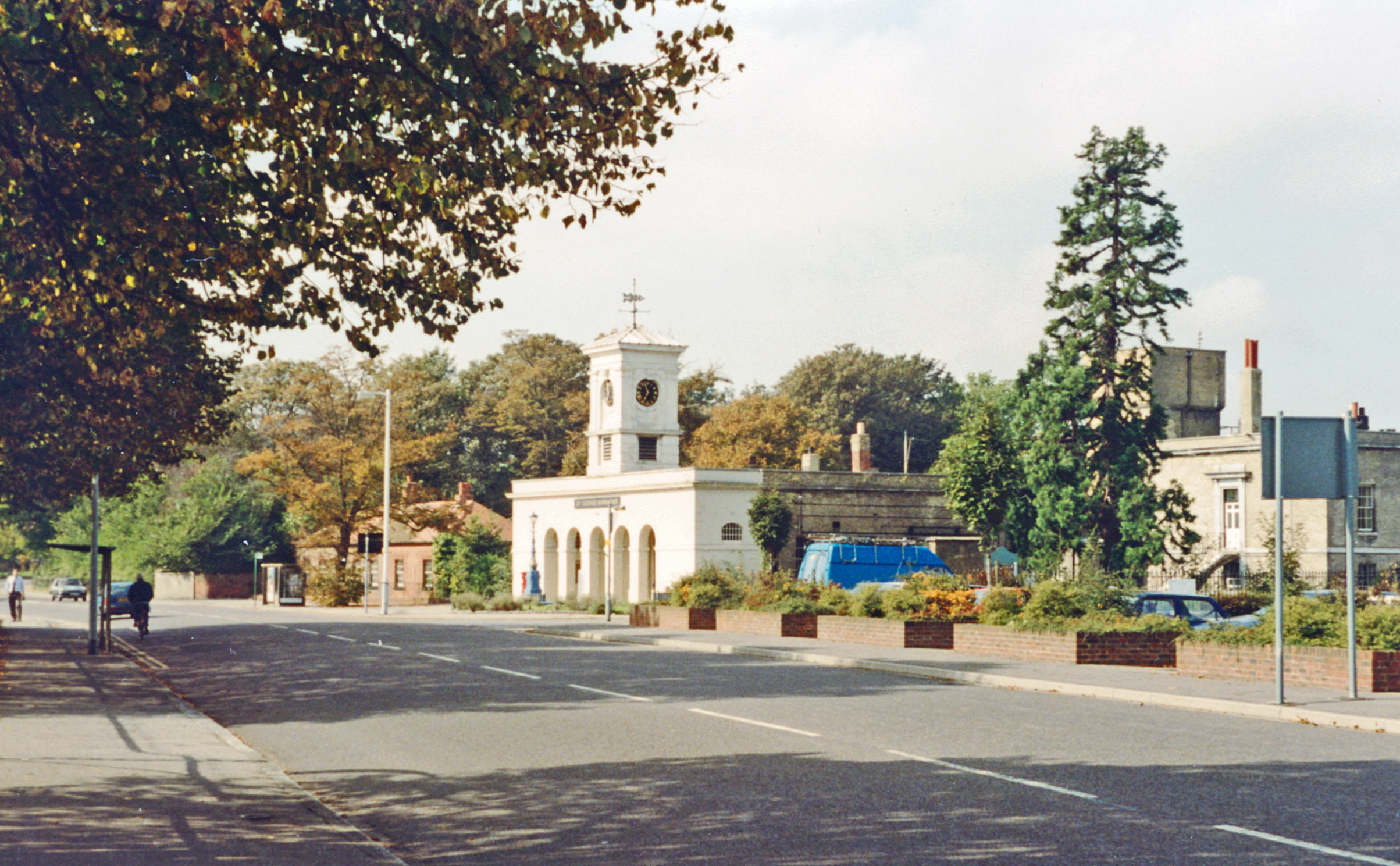
St George Barracks, guardhouse

== Transport ==
Gosport has no railway station. However, it may be considered that the town does not require a railway station due to the ferry connection to Portsmouth Harbour. The Gosport Ferry provides quick access to Portsmouth Harbour railway station, terminus of the Portsmouth Direct Line to London. Due to heavy traffic (see below) this ferry is very well used. At one time the Gosport Ferry Company operated steam ferries, until the arrival in 1966 of two identical (and then very modern) diesel ferries, named Gosport Queen and Portsmouth Queen. In 1971 a third ferry called Solent Enterprise joined the fleet. She was a slightly larger, more luxurious version of the "Queens". The company now operates two new modern ferries along with the two 1966 veterans. The first was built in 2001 and is named Spirit of Gosport. After the retirement of the Solent Enterprise in 2003, a second modern and slightly larger ferry was added to the fleet and was named the Spirit of Portsmouth. All ferries have been able to carry cycles and motorcycles.

Gosport received its railway before Portsmouth, but it closed to passengers in 1953. In 1841 a railway opened between the London and Southampton Railway at Eastleigh via Fareham to Gosport, where a terminus was built to an Italianate design of Sir William Tite. Gosport railway station was intended to serve Portsmouth across the water, but was sited at Gosport away from the harbour because the railway company was not allowed to breach either the Hilsea Lines, defences at the northern end of Portsea Island protecting Portsmouth, or the Gosport Lines protecting depots such as Royal Clarence Yard.

An extension to Royal Clarence Yard was opened in 1846, and branch lines to Stokes Bay (open from 1863 to 1915), and to Lee-on-the-Solent (open to passengers 1894 to 1931). Due to declining traffic, the connection to Fareham was closed for passenger services in 1953 and to freight traffic in 1969, although trains to the armament depot in Frater ran until the late 1970s.

The trackbed of the former Gosport – Fareham railway is now an exclusive fast bus route and cycle lane. Tite's station building has been retained for its historical and architectural value and has been converted into a small number of residential properties and offices. The main gate in Spring Garden Lane has been opened up for vehicle access. A further development of six terraced homes has been built at the north western end of the site linking with George Street.

Being a peninsula town without a railway system, Gosport relies heavily upon the major A32 road in and out of the town. Plans existed in the 1970s to widen the road to accommodate expected increases in traffic flow, but this did not take place. In the early 1990s a computerised system controlling traffic lights along the route was installed to improve the rate of flow of traffic but this failed to work and had to be switched off since it could not cope with the traffic volumes. Now, in the 21st century, the A32 is much the same as it was thirty years ago and the traffic using it has increased to such an extent that the journey time to the nearby M27, about 5 miles (8 km), can routinely take anything from 45 minutes and often longer at peak times between 07:30 and 09:00 and 16:00 and 18:30.

The station site was linked with the South Hampshire Rapid Transit scheme, which would have made use of the former railway route. However, due to Government refusal to fund the scheme, it was formally abandoned in November 2006. During 2010, construction started on the same route to provide a rapid bus route between the Holbrook area of Gosport and the town of Fareham. Now completed, regular service buses between Gosport and Fareham divert onto the new route avoiding lengthy queues on the A32 and speeding up commuting time between the towns for bus passengers. Gosport bus station used to serve the In but in 2024, a new one was made right next to it. The site is meant to become a 'people's park' but no progress has been made as of April 2026.

=== Proposed tunnel ===
In 1999, a study was undertaken by the Light Rail Transit Association in regard to a proposed tunnel connecting Gosport to Portsmouth, crossing under Portsmouth Harbour. The study proposed a 670m Immersed tube which would not require long closures of the harbour to construct, and would alleviate traffic congestion in Gosport and the surrounding area. The tunnel was intended for construction in 2002, but financial problems delayed the project. The government declined to fund the initiative in 2005.

== Present day ==
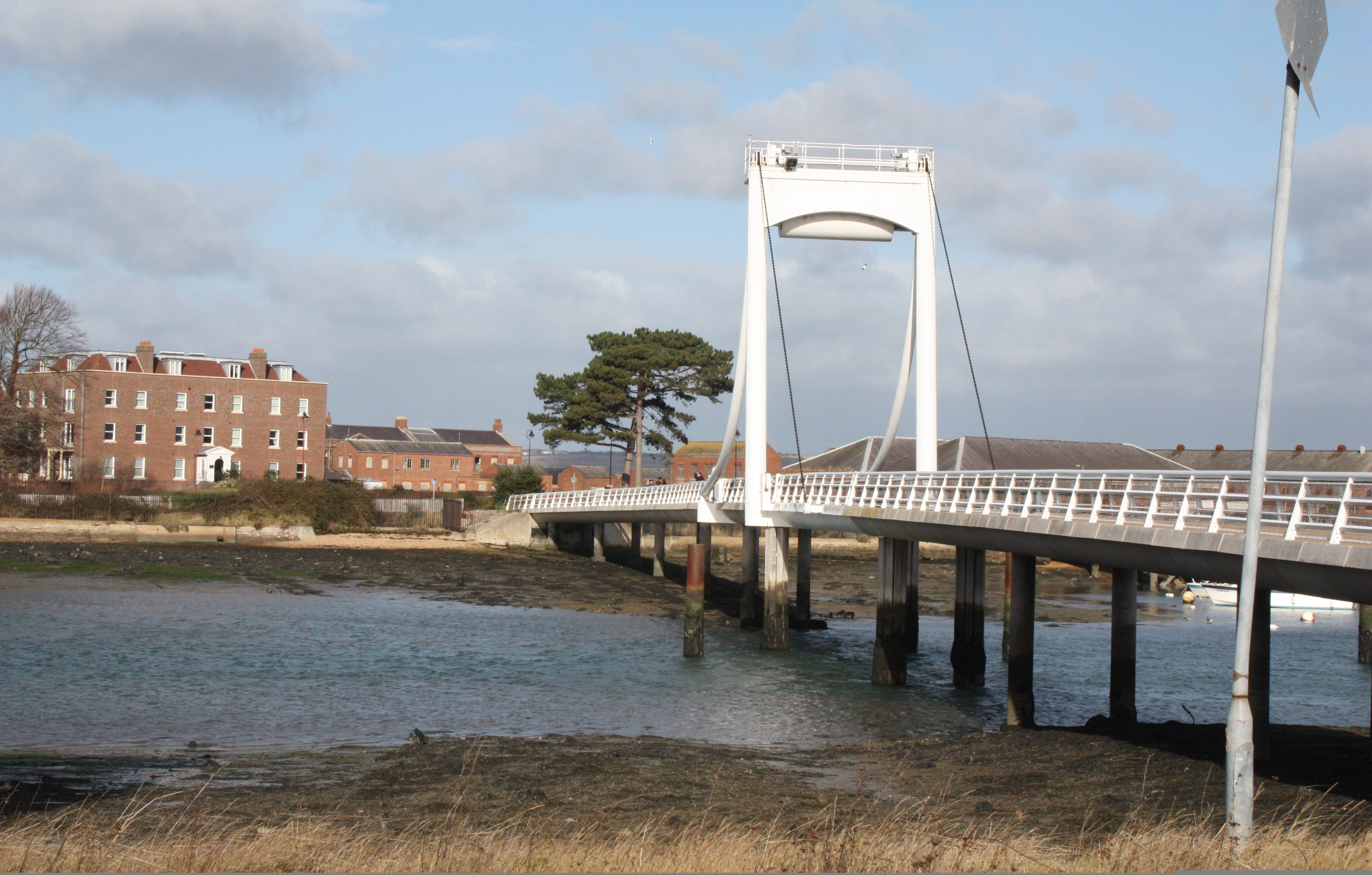
Forton Lake Millennium Bridge 2019

The 2021 Census recorded 81,952 people in Gosport district of working age between the ages of 16 and 74. The economic activity of the residents in the Gosport Borough was 39.73% were in full-time employment, 12.9% were in part-time employment, 6.23% were self-employed, 2.16% were unemployed, 1% were students with jobs, 2.6% were students without jobs, 20/81% were retired, 3.47% were looking after the home or family and 2.16% were permanently sick or disabled.

As part of the Renaissance of Portsmouth Harbour Millennium project, a large sundial, known as the Millennium Timespace, was installed on the harbour front in 2000. Its timekeeping is partially restricted each day by shadowing caused by large tower blocks either side of the 'timespace'. These towers, Seaward Tower and Harbour Tower, were built in 1963. Their surfaces are covered in mosaic murals designed by Kenneth Barden that rise the full height of the buildings and are illuminated at night. They were controversial initially but are now a tourist attraction. The tiles were produced by Poole Pottery. The International Festival of the Sea drew over 250,000 tourists to the Portsmouth Harbour area in 1998, 2001 and 2005. The most recent festival was held in 2007.

The Royal Navy maintains a presence in Gosport at HMS Sultan, which is the home of the Defence School of Marine Engineering (DSMarE) and the Royal Naval Air Engineering and Survival School (RNAESS). The Sultan site occupies 179 acres (72 ha) of land within a 3 1/2-mile (5.6 km) perimeter and is the largest of the Royal Navy's training establishments, with around 3,000 service and civilian personnel when working at full capacity.

== Education ==
The Borough of Gosport has the following schools and colleges:

=== Sixth form college ===
- St Vincent Sixth Form College
- Bay House Sixth Form College

=== Secondary schools ===
- Kings Academy Bay House, formerly known as Bay House School which is a former grammar school, located near the coast, in Stanley Park. Bay House School also includes a sixth-form.
- Bridgemary Community School, located in Wych Lane.
- Kings Academy Brune Park, formerly known as Brune Park Community School is a performing arts college, with the Joe Jackson Theatre, named after the 1970s pop star and past Brune Park pupil.

== Libraries ==
There are public libraries at Bridgemary, Elson, and at Gosport Discovery Centre. In 2020, Hampshire County Council announced plans to close the council-run Elson library. Following this, a bid was made to save the library from closure, following consultations with the community. The library reopened on 12 May 2021, operating as Elson Community Library and Hub, registered as a charity.

== Culture ==
In November 2022 the Gosport Museum and Art Gallery opened in the old Gosport Grammar School building. The building had previously been the Gosport Museum from 1975, and then the Gosport Gallery and reference library. The museum is run by Hampshire Cultural Trust. It is part of the council's urban regeneration plans. One of the aims of Hampshire Cultural Trust is to get "the community back in. We want to get the building back into use and the public back into the High Street ... [and to attract people] who do not normally go to museums".

The town has a theatre, Thorngate Hall, which was opened in 1960. It is named after an earlier Thorngate Hall, on a different site in South Street, which was destroyed by bombing in the Second World War. The earlier hall was built in 1885 and funded by the Thorngate Trust.

The town had an earlier theatre, opened in 1923.

== Media ==
Regional TV news is provided by BBC South and ITV Meridian. Television signals are received from the Rowridge TV transmitter.

Local radio stations are BBC Radio Solent on 96.1 FM, Heart South on 97.5 FM, Capital South on 103.2 FM, Easy Radio South Coast on 107.4 FM, Nation Radio South Coast on 106.0 FM, Radio Victory on 95.8 FM, Angel Radio on 98.6 FM and Gosport Hospital Radio that broadcast local programming to patients from the Gosport War Memorial Hospital in town.

The town is served by these local newspapers

- The Gosport Globe
- The News

== Sport ==
The town of Gosport has many sports clubs and organisations including boxing, judo, angling, rugby, cricket, football, model yachting, sailing, and ice hockey.

Gosport Borough F.C. play their home games at Privett Park and cater for players of either sex from age six upwards with 78 teams, the biggest youth setup in all of Hampshire. The club play in the Southern Football League and represent the town at a national level in the FA Cup and FA Trophy. The area also has another Non-League football club Fleetlands F.C. who play at Lederle Lane Stadium. RMLI Gosport F.C. were a former team to represent the town winning the 1910 FA Amateur Cup.

Gosport and Fareham Rugby Football Club has six senior sides, a Ladies team, and 10 youth sides. Gosport Borough Hockey Club, based at St Vincent College, has three Men's teams, a Ladies team and Junior teams.

Gosport Borough Cricket Club was formed in 1966 following the merger of Gosport Amateurs & Gosport C.C., and also play at Privett Park. They reached the ECB National Club Cricket Championship final at Lord's in 1980. Future England players Trevor Jesty and Phil Newport played for the club before moving on to first-class careers. In 2008 18 year old Chris Lynn was their overseas player, later going on to represent Australia in ODI & T20I matches. They currently run four adult league sides, and colts teams from Under 9 to Under 15.

Gosport is known for its ice hockey. Solent Devils, the top level men's team are based out of Planet Ice Gosport and play in the NIHL South 1 with the club's second team playing in South 2. The Devils were runners up in the league and playoffs in 2022/23. The women's team, Solent Amazons play in the WNIHL structure.

Gosport has two Synchronised Ice Skating teams who compete in national level competitions, including the British Synchronised Skating Championships. The club uses Planet Ice Gosport to train.

Gosport has a model yachting lake which has held national and international events. Boats sailed include the Vane A class, Vane 36, 1 meter, multihull, dragon force and laser. It is one of only a few lakes in the world that still races vane steered boats without remote control or electricity.

A greyhound racing track called the Gosport Greyhound and Whippet Track existed from April 1930 until June 1936 and held racing every Friday evening and Saturday afternoon. The racing was independent (not affiliated to the sports governing body the National Greyhound Racing Club) and was known as a flapping track, which was the nickname given to independent tracks. The stadium was located on the Forton Road and distances raced were mainly over 400 yards.

Gosport and Stokes Bay Golf Club is located on the Southern tip of the Gosport peninsula. The original 9-hole golf course was built in the late 19th century.

== Tourism ==
The Gosport peninsula has 17 miles (27 km) of waterfront on Portsmouth Harbour and The Solent. The pebble beach at Stokes Bay slopes steeply into the sea and offers views of the shipping going in and out of Portsmouth and Southampton and the many pleasure craft from the many marinas along The Solent and the Isle of Wight.

The town has three marinas: Gosport Marina, north of the Highstreet; Haslar Marina, south of the Highstreet near the former site of Royal Hospital Haslar; and Royal Clarence Marina which also has a Cruising Club.

The town has a strong military history – chiefly with the Royal Navy. The Royal Navy Submarine Museum has exhibits including Holland 1 – the Royal Navy's first submarine and the Second World War submarine HMS Alliance.

Explosion! tells the story of naval firepower from gunpowder to modern missiles. The museum is housed in historic buildings at Priddy's Hard, the Navy's former armaments depot, with views across Portsmouth Harbour.

Fort Brockhurst is one of the "Palmerston's Follies", built in the 1850s to defend Portsmouth Harbour against threats of a French invasion. A central exhibition explains Palmerston's plans to defend the key naval port. Nearby is the Gosport Aviation Heritage Museum, dedicated to the development of the Royal Air Force. The fort is owned by English Heritage.

Gosport is also home to Little Woodham, the 1642 Living History Village. The village exists to educate both children and adults about 17th-century life at the outbreak of the English Civil War and is open for the public to meet the villagers at certain times throughout the year.

In September 2016, the Royal Navy Submarine Museum became the set for a scene in Transformers: The Last Knight, which starred HMS Alliance. The filming brought many locals to see what was occurring.

== Twin towns ==
- Royan, France

== Notable people ==
See Category:People from Gosport

- Arthur Adams (1820–1878), physician and naturalist
- Roger Black (born 1966), Olympic athlete.
- Alfred Blake (1915–2013), former Mayor of Portsmouth.
- Richard Dawson (1932-2012), actor, game show host & comedian.
- Kevin Eldon (born 1960), actor & comedian.
- Graham Maby (born 1952), musician
- Matt Ritchie (born 1989), former Portsmouth football player.

== Freedom of the Borough ==
The following people and military units have received the Freedom of the Borough of Gosport.

=== Individuals ===
- Alex Thomson: 11 April 2014.

=== Military Units ===
- The Engineering Training School Royal Navy: 1974.
- The Royal Marines: 10 November 2005.
- Royal Hospital Haslar: 28 March 2007.
- Ministry of Defence Hospital Unit Portsmouth: 8 March 2007.
- 33 Field Hospital 2nd Medical Brigade RAMC: 23 April 2010.
- HMS Sultan, RN: 22 March 2013.

== See also ==
- List of places of worship in the Borough of Gosport
- Gosport and Fareham Inshore Rescue Service
- "The Gosport Tragedy" (a broadside ballad)
