= Fort Brockhurst =

Historic fort in Gosport, England

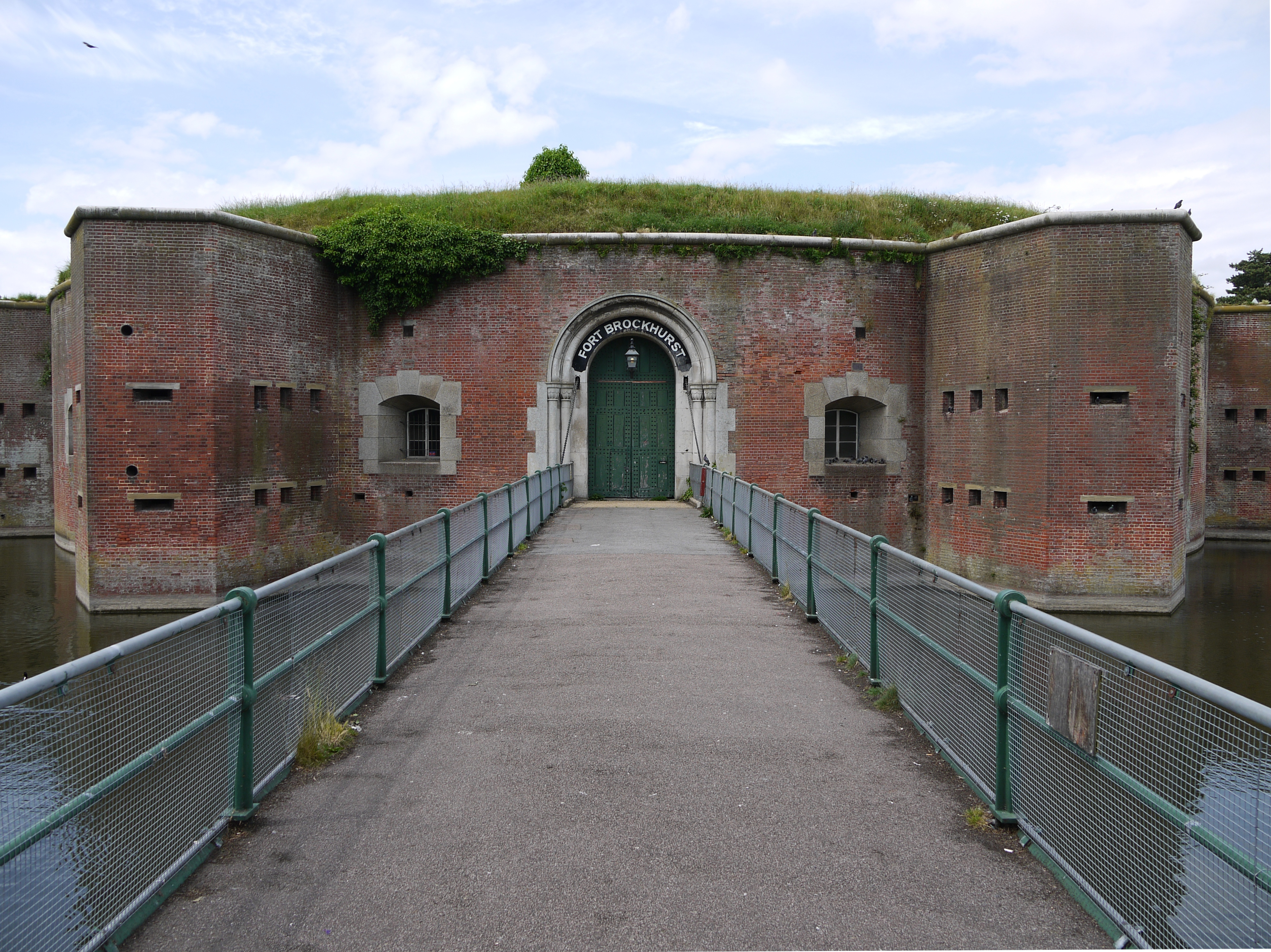
- Fort Brockhurst entrance

- Location within Hampshire
- 50°48′52.91″N 1°9′17.01″W
- Type: Palmerston Fort
- Location: Gosport
- OS grid reference: SU 59600 02063

History
- Built: 1858–1862

Site notes
- Area: Hampshire
- Architect: William Crossman
- Owner: English Heritage

Scheduled monument
- Official name: Fort Brockhurst, Gosport
- Designated: 7 Aug 1967
- Reference no.: 1013401

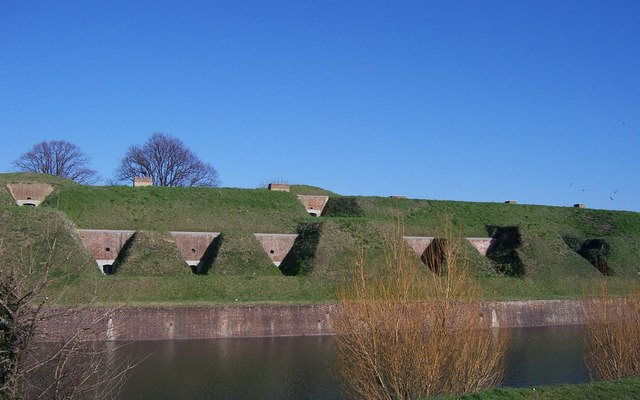
Fort Brockhurst.

Fort Brockhurst is one of the Palmerston Forts, in Gosport, England, and a scheduled monument. It is now an English Heritage property.

== History ==
=== Construction, 1858–1862 ===
Fort Brockhurst was designed by William Crossman in the 19th century to protect Portsmouth. Built between 1858 and 1862, it was one of a chain of five similar forts known as the Gosport Advanced Line. The other forts are Fort Elson to the north and Fort Grange, Fort Rowner and Fort Gomer to the south. With their formidable firepower, their main purpose was to guard the dockyards from potential attack from landing areas on the Hampshire coast. Construction took place amid fears of a French invasion at the time, which, in the event, never occurred.

Changes in artillery technology meant that the fort was obsolete before construction was even completed. Increases in range left the fort too close to the dockyard, meaning that a landing force that had arrived elsewhere on the coast would not need to pass the fort in order to bombard Portsmouth harbour. This was the reason for the construction of Fort Fareham at a greater distance from the harbour, which was completed six years later in 1868.

=== Commission, 1862–1957 ===
From 18 September 1882 onwards, (Note: 'The depot for the discharge of soldiers sent home periodically from India and other foreign stations, either as invalids or time expired men, which has for so many years been carried out at the Royal Victoria Hospital at Netley will on Monday next, [18 September 1882] be permanently transferred to Fort Brockhurst at Gosport.') it was used as a depot, to demobilise soldiers returning from India, whose time period of active service had come to an end. In 1898, on average from 9,000 to 10,000 soldiers were passing through on an annual basis. During the 1880s, it used to take fully a week to get a big detachment through the depot, but in subsequent years the soldier was only spending several days at the depot, prior to their transfer to the Army Reserve, and civilian life. (Note: 'After being thirty-one days at sea, uneventful ones too, I was pretty glad when I landed at Southampton [in 1909], from where time-expired men were sent to Fort Brockhurst, Gosport. Here I was issued with a cheap ready-made suit, which fitted me fairly well, and then dispatched to my home, being now transferred to the Army Reserve.') When all necessary formalities had been completed, the ex-soldier was marched to Fort Brockhurst railway station, to take the train to their home.

In August 1914, 9th (Heavy) Battery Royal Garrison Artillery was formed at the fort as part of the raising of Kitchener's Army. It suffered minor bomb damage during the Second World War, but never saw action under its intended purpose. The fort did remain in commission however until 1957, serving variously as accommodation, storage and training facilities.

=== English Heritage site, 1957–present ===
Although modern life has encroached on the fort, its fabric remains largely unaltered and the parade ground, gun ramps and moated keep can all be viewed. Constructional details of the casemates are able to be seen due to unrepaired Second World War bomb damage at the north-east corner. It is currently used as a store for English Heritage's reserve collections. The fort is occasionally open to the public, while the grounds are freely accessible.

== Layout of the fort ==
The polygonal shape of the fort was a revolutionary change from the prevailing orthodoxy of forts designed with angle bastions for defence. The new forts could be more easily adapted to the terrain and allowed a greatly increased number of heavy guns mounted on the ramparts to prioritise offence over defence. Each fort was located within gunshot of the next to allow overlapping fields of fire and mutual support.

The fort was surrounded by a moat and the entrance on the southeast side was approached by a drawbridge much like a medieval castle. This led to a circular keep, also moated, which served as a place for local defence, being equipped with twenty light guns. The nineteen heavy guns of the main armament were mounted on the ramparts reached by two ramps on the enclosed parade ground in the middle of the fort. A lower tier of eight guns, four in casements, on each flank provided cross fire support with Elson and Rowner. Beyond the moat on the north side was a triangular redan accessed by a covered way to allow riflemen to cover attempts to bridge the moat. Similarly there were caponiers at the angles of the ramparts to allow riflemen to cover the moat.

Fort Rowner to the southwest is in a similar state of preservation, but the military base RAF Gosport, now known as HMS Sultan, was built around it in 1914, and it is opened to the public only once a year under the banner of "Heritage Open Week."

== Bibliography ==
- Richards, Frank (1986) [1936]. "Ch XX Home again". Old Soldier Sahib. London: Faber & Faber. ISBN 978-1-84342-558-8 – via archive.org.
- Rinaldi, Richard A (2008). Order of Battle of the British Army 1914. Ravi Rikhye. ISBN 978-0-9776072-8-0.
