= Kenneth Barden =

British architect, mural designer and painter

- Born: 15 January 1924; Huddersfield, England
- Died: 9 November 1988 (aged 64); Hounslow, England
- Occupation: Architect
- Spouse: Edwina Partridge Clark
- Children: 2
- Buildings: Seaward Tower and Harbour Tower, Gosport; murals at Halifax swimming pool

Signature
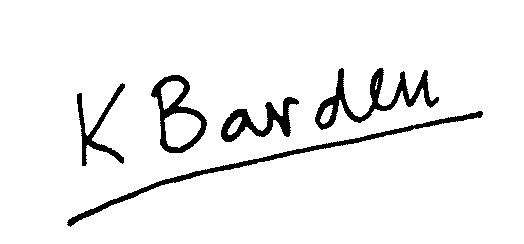

Kenneth Barden (15 Jan 1924 – 09 Nov 1988) was an architect, mural designer and painter in the UK. His tiled murals found outside and inside public buildings are examples of post-war public art. He was the principal architect for the builders George Wimpey and Co. Ltd. during part of his career.

== Artistic career ==
He is best known for his murals of post-war public art. He had qualified as an architect, becoming an Associate of the Royal Institute of British Architects. For part of his career he was the principal architect for the builders George. Wimpey and Co Ltd.

In 1955 he was commissioned by the Hertfordshire and Essex Water Board to produce a decorative ceramic mural inside a Pump House in Sawbridgeworth that showed pump mechanisms.

While working for George Wimpey and Co. Ltd, and together with J E Tyrrell, Chief Architectural Assistant to Gosport Borough Council, Barden was responsible for Seaward Tower and Harbour Tower, two sixteen-storey tower blocks built in 1963 on the Esplanade in Gosport. The surfaces of the tower blocks are covered in mosaic murals designed by Barden that rise the full 135 foot height of the buildings. They were controversial initially but are now a tourist attraction. The tiles were produced by Carter and Co of Poole.

Barden was also responsible for two ceramic murals in a Halifax swimming pool inspired by British pond life. The building was designed by the borough architects FH Hoyles and JL Berbiers and was opened in 1966. The future of these murals was put at risk when construction of a new sports centre including a swimming pool was proposed for Halifax in 2017. This included demolition, or possible alternative use of the 1966 building. A proposal for the building to be given protected listed building status was rejected in 2020. The building was closed in 2020 due to the COVID-19 pandemic and was damaged significantly by cold, including to the pool hall walls and interior tiles, resulting in permanent closure. By 2024 the building had been significantly vandalised. The Barden murals were still present. In February 2025 Calderdale Council announced that the result of a survey of the mural indicated stress fractures in some tiles and that any attempt to remove them would cause further damage. Digital images of the mural were proposed as a way to incorporate something from it in a new leisure centre building. By later in 2025, a digital record of the murals had been created and demolition of the building was planned to be complete before 2026.

Barden also exhibited works in watercolour and oils twice at the Royal Academy Summer Exhibition, in 1969 and 1972 and at Royal Institute of Painters in Watercolours exhibitions in the 1970s. One of his paintings is in the collection at Beecroft Art Gallery in Southend-on-Sea, Essex.

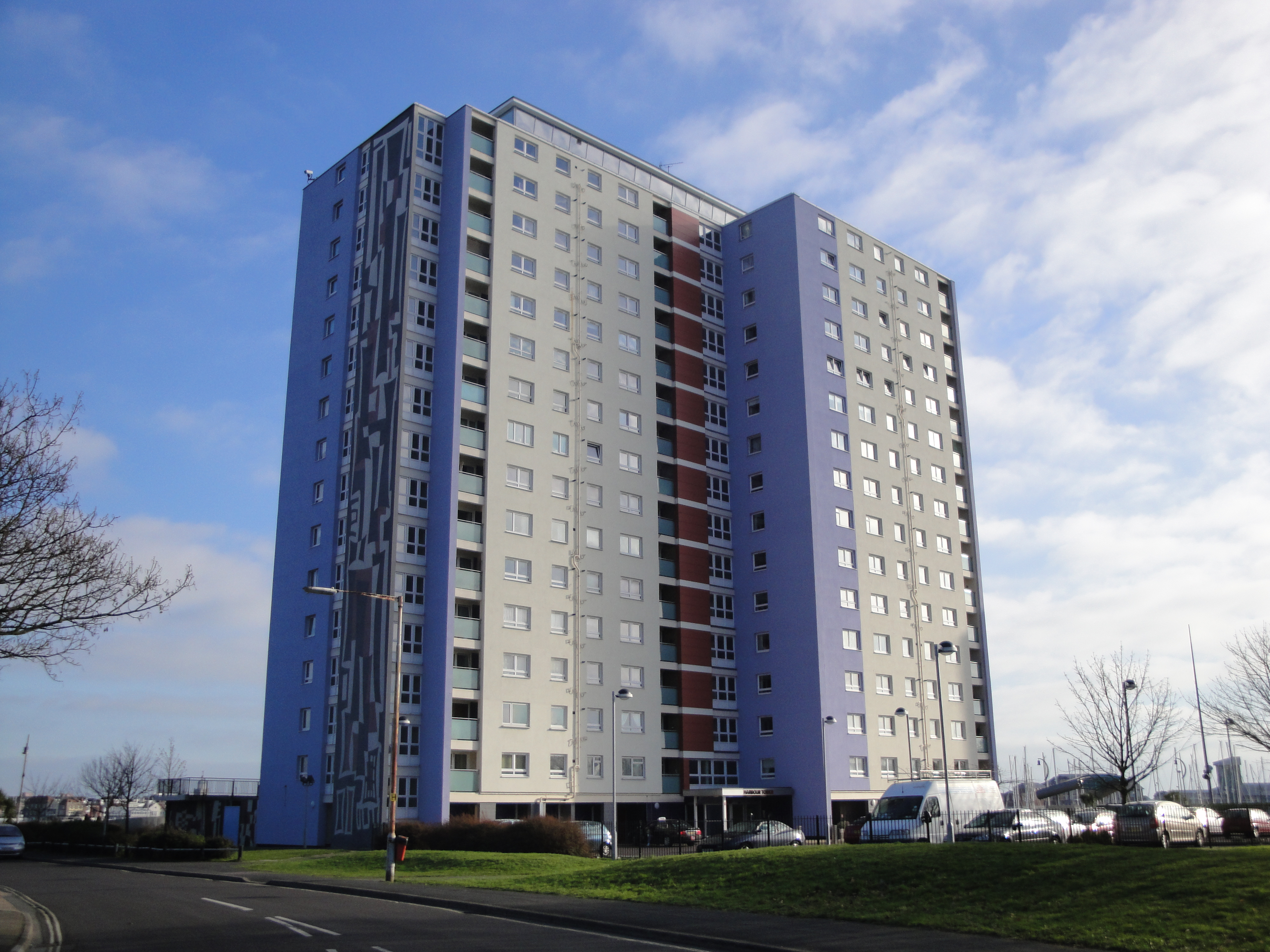
Harbour Tower, Gosport, showing the murals by Kenneth Barden

== Early and personal life ==
Barden was brought up in Huddersfield where he attended Crosland Moor School and then Huddersfield College of Art. His father, Harry Barden was a master printer. In 1947 he began study at the Royal College of Art in London, finally becoming an Associate of the Royal College of Art.

He married Edwina Partridge Clark in 1955 and they had 2 sons.
