= Fort Grange =

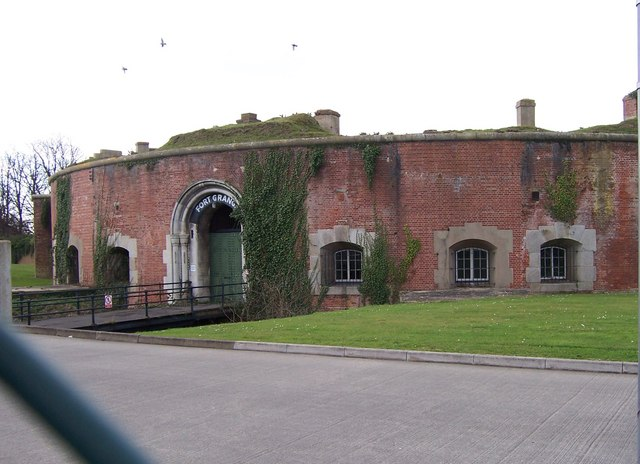

- Location within Hampshire
- 50°47′55″N 1°09′45″W
- Type: Palmerston Fort
- Location: Gosport
- OS grid reference: SU 59128 00221

History
- Built: 1858–1863

Site notes
- Area: Hampshire
- Architect: William Crossman
- Owner: Ministry of Defence

Listed Building – Grade II
- Official name: Fort Grange, Gosport
- Designated: 20 Apr 1983
- Reference no.: 1233816

Fort Grange is one of the Palmerston Forts, in Gosport, England. After Gomer and Elson forts had been approved in 1852, further consideration led to a decision to fill the gap between them by three more forts, and Grange is the most southerly of the three. Work began in 1858 and it was completed in 1863.

Built as part of the outer defence line for Gosport along with Fort Brockhurst, Fort Elson and Fort Rowner to the North East and Fort Gomer to the South West. In 1914 23 (Siege) Company Royal Garrison Artillery was based at the Fort. It was used to create number 3 and 4 Siege Batteries Royal Garrison Artillery.

The fort is a Grade II Listed Building and is virtually identical with Forts Brockhurst and Rowner.

In 1917, the Fort Grange Aerodrome became the home to Robert Smith-Barry's School of Special Flying.

There are many surviving details and the main structure is intact, however the earthworks have been much reduced and much of the moat is infilled. In 1916 it was armed with a 1-pounder heavy anti aircraft gun on a travelling carriage. The fort was used as a military headquarters from 1910 and was derelict by 1983. In 1984 Fort Grange became the home of HMS Sultan Royal Naval Volunteer Cadet Corps, and continues to fulfil this role today.

== Bibliography ==
- Hogg, Ian V (1974). Coast Defences of England and Wales 1856-1956. David & Charles. ISBN 0-7153 6353-0.
- Moore, David (1990). Fort Brockhurst and the Gomer-Elson Forts. Gosport: Solent Papers. ISBN 0951323431.
