= Fort Rowner =

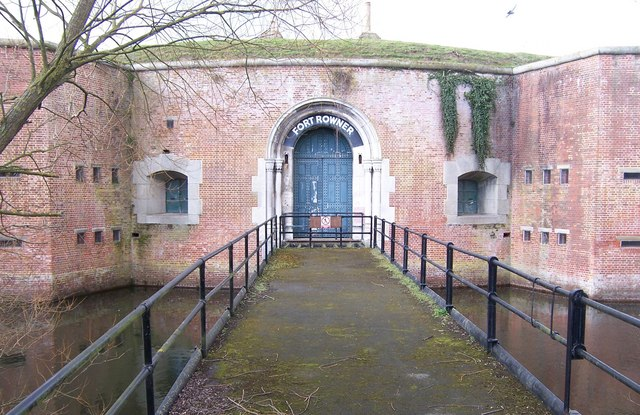
- Fort Rowner entrance

- Location within Hampshire
- 50°48′24″N 1°09′34″W
- Type: Palmerston Fort
- Location: Gosport
- OS grid reference: SU 59406 01122

History
- Built: 1858–1862

Site notes
- Area: Hampshire
- Architect: William Crossman
- Owner: Ministry of Defence

Listed Building – Grade II
- Official name: Fort Rowner, Gosport
- Designated: 20 Apr 1983
- Reference no.: 1233871

Fort Rowner is one of the Palmerston Forts, in Gosport, England.

Built circa 1858 as part of the outer defence line for Gosport along with Fort Brockhurst and Fort Elson to the North East and Fort Grange and Fort Gomer to the South West. The fort was later used as a barracks and then by the Royal Navy as a degaussing establishment. It has been a Grade II Listed Building since 1983.

== Design and construction ==
Fort Rowner was designed by William Crossman to protect Portsmouth. With its formidable firepower, its main purpose was to guard the approach from potential landing areas on the south Hampshire coast. According to the record plans of Fort Grange, the estimated costs of Rowner, Brockhurst and Grange were £300,000 whilst the actual costs were :- Rowner £52,994, Brockhurst £51.514, Grange £60,676, a total of £169,228 charged to the vote and £2,956 to the loan. The contractor was Mr. Piper. During the construction of Fort Rowner in 1861 fractures were discovered in some of the arches of the left flank and keep. The former was reconstructed and tie rods were inserted to remedy the faults in the keep. Forts Brockhurst, Grange and Rowner were designed on the plan of a detached bastion with an obtuse salient. Each fort was excavated from the level, the earth excavated from the ditch being used to build the ramparts and the redan. The three forts were constructed as nearly as possible on a straight line so securing their fronts from the effects of enfilade. They were intended as bastions affording each other mutual support but, as the ditches of one could not be flanked by the other, caponiers were necessary at the angles. Rowner was condemned as faulty by the Inspector of Works and the contractor was fired in 1862. The work was taken over by the Royal Engineers and completed using military labour at a cost of £1,561 to correct the faults. A feature of the three new Gosport Advanced Line forts was the circular keep placed centrally to the rear. It was still argued in military circles that a keep, although considered by some to be an unnecessary hang-over from the medieval period, was still needed to protect the unfortunate survivors of a fort that had been overrun by the enemy from the overzealous excesses of a victorious army.

== Armament ==
The fort was intended to be armed with 53 heavy guns; 19 of these were on the faces, 16 on the flanks, a lower tier of 9 guns in each flanking gallery under the ramparts with a further 30 lighter guns in the keep and caponiers besides 4 x 13-inch mortars on the parade ground. The site plan for the Gosport Advanced Forts lists the following armament :- Redoubt and Haxo 11 x 8-inch S.B. Left flank & caponier (2 Haxo) 13 x 8-inch S.B. Centre Caponier 6 x 8-inch S.B. Right flank & caponier (2 Haxo) 13 x 8-inch S.B. Left & Right shoulders terreplein2 x 40-pr. Armstrong Parade 4 x 13-inch mortars In 1886 Fort Brockhurst had mounted: 13 x 8-inch Smooth Bore (S.B.) guns, 16 x 7-inch Rifled Breech Loaders (R.B.L.s) and 4 x 64 pounder Rifled Muzzle Loaders (R.M.L.s) The armament of the fort remained until 1902 when all of the Gosport Advanced Line forts were disarmed. In 1916 it was armed with a 6-pounder Hotchkiss heavy anti aircraft gun.

== Use of the fort ==
The fort was manned by companies from the Royal Garrison Artillery and in the 1880s it became the Depot of the 2nd Brigade Southern Division R.G.A. Various regiments were quartered in the fort during the Victorian period as they moved to and from postings in the U.K. and the colonies. In 1902 it was home to No.2 Depot Southern Group R.G.A. with 35 Siege Train Company (with companies Nos 31 & 108 became 1st. Heavy Brigade).

Both Fort Grange and Fort Rowner were incorporated into HMS Siskin in 1945 when the R.A.F. moved out. This in turn became HMS Sultan in 1956 and the forts are still within their jurisdiction.

After April 1947 Rowner was briefly home to the Naval Air Medical School. Its static decompression chamber was installed in the fort by October 1947 and a second chamber arrived from Rosyth in July 1951. Shortly after the facility was transferred to Seafield Park. The fort then became home to the Royal Navy Degaussing Establishment for over twenty years. This facility remained until 1991.

== The fort today ==
Rowner was heavily overgrown for many years until the Navy, at a cost of £400,000, cleared its ramparts and the roof of the keep in 1994. The keep is mostly derelict but its moat still holds water and is well stocked with coarse fish. Regular matches are held on the water and forms part of the Portsmouth RN & RM Coarse Angling association syndicate waters.

== Bibliography ==
- Hogg, Ian V (1974). Coast Defences of England and Wales 1856-1956. David & Charles. ISBN 0-7153 6353-0.
- Moore, David (1990). Fort Brockhurst and the Gomer-Elson Forts. Gosport: Solent Papers. ISBN 0951323431.
