= Browndown Battery =

Artillery battery in Gosport, Hampshire, England

Coordinates: 50°47′13″N 1°10′30″W

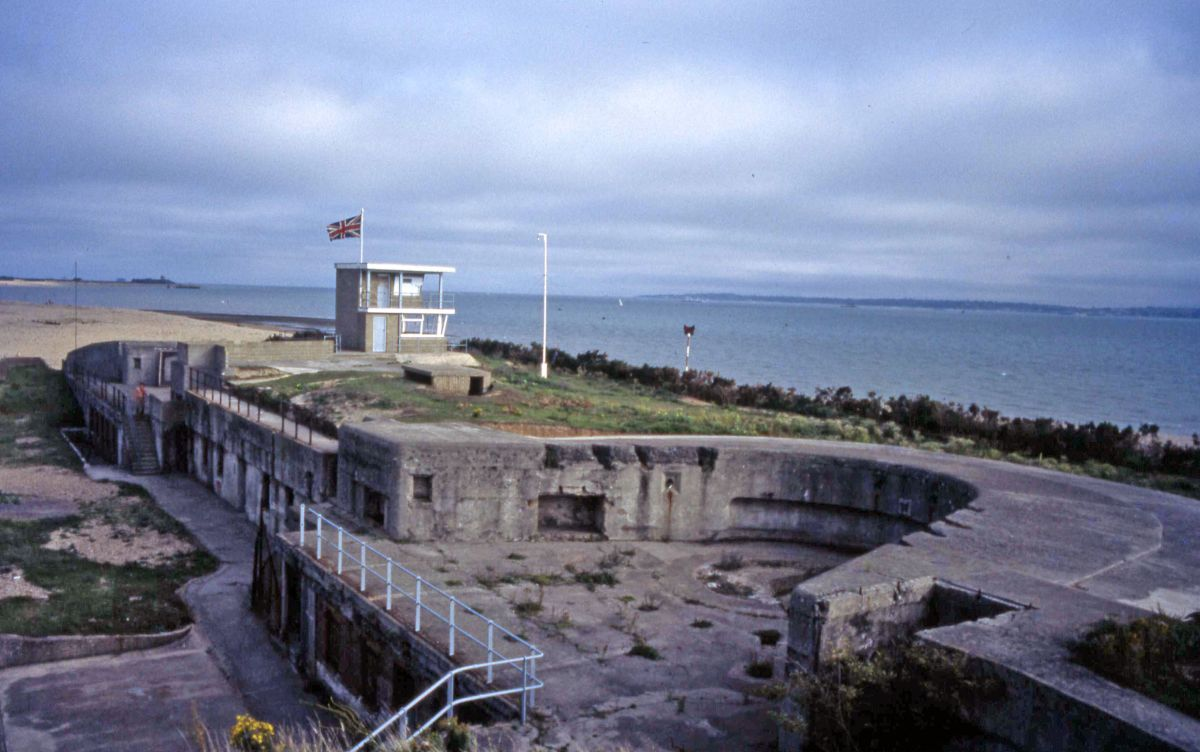
View of Browndown Battery showing the right 9.2-inch B.L. emplacement

Browndown Battery, also referred to erroneously in some sources as Browndown Fort, is a former military coastal defence fortification and base on the Southern shoreline of England in the county of Hampshire. First erected in the mid-1840s, the battery was continuously modified until disarmed in 1905/6. It has been a Grade II Listed Building since 1983.

== The first Browndown Batteries ==
The first batteries at Browndown were erected on the shore at Browndown Point to the west end of Stokes Bay at Gosport to defend the western approach to Portsmouth harbour and to prevent an enemy landing on the beach. These batteries were known as Browndown Battery East and Browndown Battery West. They were complete by 1852 but were heavily criticised by James Fergusson (who was later to become the Treasury Representative on the 1860 Royal Commission into the defences of the United Kingdom) in his papers The Peril of Portsmouth and Portsmouth Protected. According to an armament list of 1860 Browndown Battery East had positions for three 68pr of 112 cwt. and seven 8-inch smooth bore guns of 65 cwt. whilst Browndown Battery West had positions for three 68pr. and eight 8-inch smooth bore guns. Ordnance Survey maps indicate the eastern battery had fallen in disuse by 1870 whilst the western one was retained until it was replaced by a new battery as part of the western defences of Portsmouth Harbour.

== The new Browndown Battery ==
In 1890 The Defence Committee reviewed a proposal to remove or remodel the two old Browndown Batteries in Stokes Bay, and recommended that the Eastern Battery, being superseded by the work at the western extremity of the Stokes Bay Lines, and interfering with the fire of that work, should be removed; that the western battery should be retained, as it is of value to flank the beach, but that its present armament may be removed.

Although the completion of the Stokes Bay Lines in 1860 had rendered the Browndown Batteries obsolete, there was a need for a battery to protect the deep water anchorage off Browndown Point and the new Browndown Battery was constructed for two 12.5-inch R.M.L. guns on the site of the old Browndown battery West, paid for under the Imperial Defence Loan of 1888 at a cost of £4,237. Building commenced in October 1888 and was completed in August 1889. The rear wall (or gorge) of the old battery was retained and two sea facing concrete emplacements were constructed for the new 12.5-inch R.M.L. guns on C pivot dwarf traversing platforms. The magazines for shells and cartridges were placed between the two emplacements. A side arm and artillery store was built to the right of the battery.

== The last Browndown Battery ==
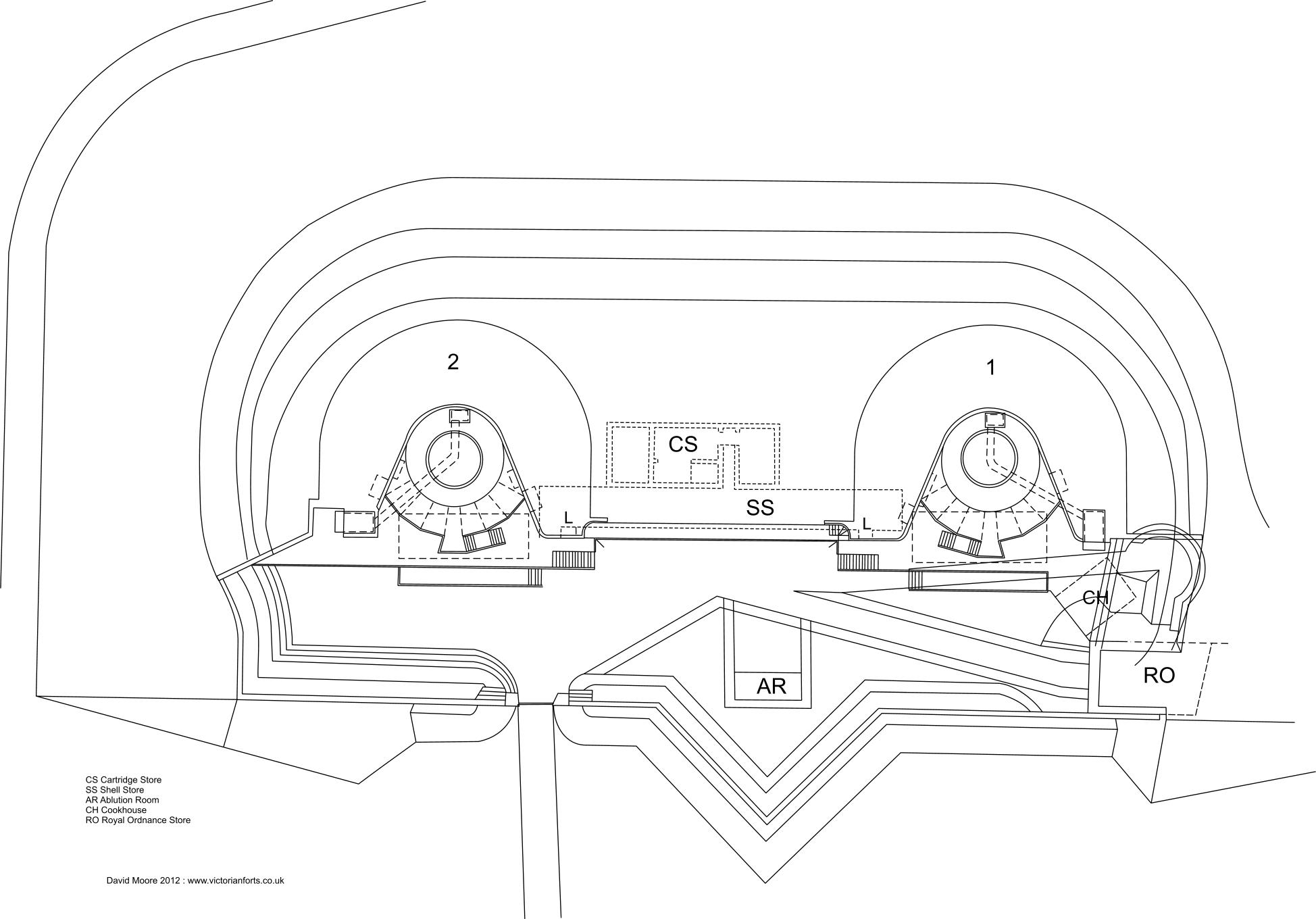
1904 Plan of the last Browndown Battery

In 1890 it was proposed to update the armament of the Stokes Bay defences by adding two 6-inch and two 9.2-inch B.L. guns at either end of the Bay. These guns formed the standard coast defence artillery of this period and always operated in pairs of complementary guns to counter armoured and unarmoured ships (blockers). Fort Gilkicker was remodeled for two 6 inch and two 9.2-inch B.L. guns at the east end of the bay whilst Stokes Bay Lines No.2 Battery was remodeled to hold the western two 6-inch B.L. guns. Its complementary guns, two 9.2-inch B.L. guns were to be fitted to Browndown Battery. The new battery had the usual shell and cartridge store between the two gun emplacements which were extended and enlarged from the old R.M.L.magazines. To the west of the magazines a cookhouse was added. Two crew shelters were also added in the extension. A Battery Command Post and telephone room were constructed above the Artillery Store at the west end. This communicated with the Battery Command post on No.2 Battery of the Stokes Bay Lines and with those at Fort Gilkicker.

The new battery received its armament of two 9.2-inch B.L. Mark 10 guns on Barbette 5 mountings by 1904 but was declared superfluous by the Owen Committee in 1905. The guns mounted at Browndown and Gilkicker only cover an area accessible to vessels which have forced the outer defences, to do which such vessels would certainly have to be prepared to suffer the damage which the naval opinion, already quoted, considers sufficient to deter the attempt. The Committee, therefore consider these works as superfluous and the modern conditions laid down for their guidance. This was the death knell for the battery. It was disarmed in 1906

== Later use ==
The battery was retained by the army as part of the Browndown Training facility and Browndown Ranges. It saw a brief new lease of life when a lookout post was constructed on top of the east gun position as part of the training area used by the combined services hovercraft unit. According to the military authorities Browndown Battery is a listed building and because of its location inside a military training area, it is in excellent condition. though modified and strengthened many times during its history much of the original building is still identifiable.

== Browndown Camp ==
Browndown Camp at the site was a barracks facility with an attached assault course and a 25-metre small arms firing range. The fort itself was utilized in some defensive tactical training, but was too small for use in OBUA (Operations in Built Up Areas) exercises. The Camp was used by the Royal Marines' Small Arms Corps from 1922 to 1959; the British Army's South East District command as a Minor Training Facility in 1961, and by 121 Weekend Training Centre up to the mid-1970s. Subsequently, its facilities were used by the ACF, CCF, ATC and the Territorial Army.

In 2002 it was used as the setting for the historical reality series Lads' Army as a mock 1950's British Army National Service training course, and was utilised a second time in 2005 by the series renamed Bad Lads' Army as a mock Officer Cadet School.

In 2009 the Ministry of Defence concluded in a review of its estates that Browndown Camp was surplus to requirement and it was closed. The site was released and sold to a private contractor for £754,000 in 2012. The beach at the site is still used for military training in Amphibious Warfare given its vicinity to the Marchwood Military Port.
