= Walton Academy =

Walton Academy may refer to:

- Walton Academy, Grantham
- Civil Services Academy Lahore
