= Central Technology and Sports College =

Secondary school in the north of Grantham in Lincolnshire, England

The Central Technology and Sports College

Location
- Rushcliffe Road; Manthorpe Estate, Grantham, Lincolnshire, NG31 8ED; England; 52°55′24″N 0°38′35″W

Information
- Type: Foundation school
- Established: 1920
- Closed: 2010
- Local authority: Lincolnshire
- Specialists: Technology, sports
- Department for Education URN: 120722 Tables
- Ofsted: Reports
- Gender: Boys (1920-1978); Mixed (1978-2010)
- Age: 11 to 16
- Enrolment: 695
- Fate: Became part of the Priory Ruskin Academy

Central Technology & Sports College was a secondary school in the north of Grantham in Lincolnshire, England. It became part of The Priory Ruskin Academy in 2010.

== History ==
The Central School has its origins in the Central and Day Continuation School built behind the Town Hall in 1920. In the late 1920s, the school burnt down from a fire that started in the boiler room.

There later followed two single sex secondary modern schools, the Boys' Central School on Sandon Road and the Girls' Central School on Castlegate, in the town centre. The Boys' Central School was built in 1928. For two years previously the school was at Middlemore House in Castlegate.

The Girls' Central School became Walton Girls High School in 1966 on Kitty Briggs Lane, next to the newly built bypass, off the A607. Walton Girls is now an 11-18 school, with boys in the sixth form. The former site of the Boys' Central School now houses the Little Gonerby Church of England Infant School, which moved to the site in January 1986, from its site in Albion Street it had been at since 1863. The site on Sandon Road closed on 18 March 1978.

When a boys' school, it was not a secondary modern school because admittance to the school was only through achieving a reasonable score in the eleven-plus exam. This was also true for the Girls' Central School, which was not a secondary modern school. By this selective procedure, it was like a technical school, although not described in name as a technical school.

In December 1960 it was first proposed to build a school on 12.7 acres of playing fields. A new road to the site would cost £2,600. In December 1962 the Estates and Highways council committee named the new private estate as the Cliffe Estate.

In June 1975 it was decided to build a 600-place school for 1976-76, but there were objections, so the county council decided to wait. A new 120-place infants school on Northcliffe Road opened in September 1976, the £120,000 Cliffedale County Infants. The new secondary school was intended to be the clarion call for comprehensive education in Grantham, when it opened, which is the reason that the school opened as a co-educational school.

From April 1976 until April 1978, a new school was built on the Manthorpe estate next to Grantham and District Hospital, on land formerly owned by the foundation governors of the boys' grammar school. The site opened in April 1978, admitting boys only. The new building cost £850,000 (£4.65 million current value). When the new site opened again in September 1978, it admitted girls (in the first year) as a coeducational school. By 1982 was the school fully co-educational.

When the site moved to Manthorpe, it was then described as Grantham's only comprehensive school.

In the 1990s it had around 550 pupils.

It was situated directly north of the Grantham and District Hospital off Sandcliffe Road, between the A607 and the East Coast Main Line, which borders on to the western edge of the school's playing fields. The River Witham is around 330 yards (300 m) to the east.

In 2010 the school merged with the Grantham Church High School to form The Priory Ruskin Academy.

=== Fire in 1980 ===
A Fifth-year student burned down the main teaching block, causing £450,000 damage. At Lincoln Crown Court he received three months at a youth detention centre in April 1981, and the school was fully operational by October 1981. The fire destroyed thirteen classrooms. The individual had had a minor disagreement with a teacher, and he had wanted to cause a small amount of damage in teenage protest, but the fire took hold instead.

The fire took place at 8.20pm on Wednesday 29 October 1980 during the half term. Fire crews arrived from Brant Broughton and Corby Glen. There were 650 at the school.

== Notable former pupils ==
=== Boys' Central School ===
- Mike Brindley, Principal from 1982 to 1997 of Plymouth College of Art and Design (Arts University Plymouth from 2022)
- Tom Broadbridge, film producer
- Eric Chappell, TV writer of Rising Damp
- Vince Eager (Roy Taylor), 1950s singer
- Derek Fowler CBE, Deputy Chairman of British Rail in 1990
- Cyril Hatton, footballer for QPR (scored 64 league goals)
- Sergeant Maurice Verdun Mapletoft (19 March 1916 - February 1997) Hurricane pilot in the Battle of France, shot down in Hurricane N2355 by a Messerschmitt Bf 109 of Lehrgeschwader 2 (LG 2) at 11.30am on 19 May 1940 over Seclin, and baled out wounded with 504 Squadron; from Carlton Scroop, he later moved to Newark-on-Trent then West Bridgford (promoted to Flying Officer in October 1945)
- Richard Nauyokas, from Bad Lads' Army
- (Gilbert) David (Marson) Wood CBE (June 1914 - May 1990), the former Political Editor of The Times, he started at the Grantham Journal in 1928, and joined The Times in 1948; he was awarded the CBE in the 1983 Birthday Honours
