= John Towlerton Leather =

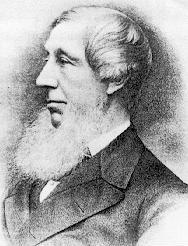
- Born: August 30, 1804; Beeston Park, Yorkshire, United Kingdom
- Died: 1885 (aged 80–81)
- Occupation: Civil engineer
- Known for: Consulting engineer on the Dale Dyke Dam which collapsed causing the Great Sheffield Flood

John Towlerton Leather (1804–1885) was a British civil engineering contractor.

In his early career was employed by the Sheffield Waterworks Company, and involved in the construction of several dams. He entered private practice in 1839, initially in partnership with Mr Waring (of Waring Brothers).

He was contracted on civil engineering works including railways, harbour walls and bridge foundation construction. In the 1860s he was a consulting engineer on the Dale Dyke Dam which collapsed causing the Great Sheffield Flood.

He also known for his work on the breakwater at Portland harbour, the forts at Spithead, an extension to the Portsmouth Dockyards, and as the founder of the Hunslet Engine Company of Leeds. Leather was also, for many years, the proprietor of Waterloo Main Colliery near Leeds.

== Early life ==
John Towlerton Leather was born in Beeston Park, Yorkshire on 30 August 1804. He trained under his uncle George Leather, engineer of the Aire and Calder Navigation, and of the Goole docks. In 1829 he began his own practice in Sheffield, and became engineer of the Sheffield Waterworks Company in 1833.

== Career ==
As engineer to the Sheffield Waterworks Company he helped create the Redmires Reservoirs and the Crooke's Moore Reservoirs, during which time the young John Fowler trained under him.

In 1839 he entered into partnership with Mr Waring (later of Waring Brothers) as contractors - they were involved in construction of parts of the Midland Railway (Chesterfield) and London and North Western Railway (Chester and Crewe). The partnership with Waring ended and Leather undertook the construction (c.1846-9) of the Tadcaster to York section of the York and North Midland Railway's York to Leeds line, the construction of which was abandoned before it was completed. Between 1847 and 1850 he carried out the Erewash Valley Line. In the mid 1850s he was contracted to carry out improvements to the River Nene, which were also abandoned. In 1849 he was awarded the contract for the construction of the breakwater at Portland Harbour.

J. T. Leather was also involved in coalmining enterprises. In 1843 he invested £3500 to join in a new partnership with Kirkby Fenton to run his existing Waterloo colliery at Temple Newsam near Leeds and he came to live at Leventhorpe Hall which had recently been vacated by Fenton. Leather withdrew from the partnership in 1851 and shortly after opened his own colliery nearby, calling it Waterloo Main.

He was also involved in difficult work on the foundations of the Ness Suspension Bridge in the 1850s, and repair work to the Middle Level Navigations in the 1860s under John Hawkshaw.

In 1864 the Dale Dyke Dam, the construction of which he had been supervising, collapsed, causing the Great Sheffield Flood which killed over 200 people. Expert opinion at the time differed over the causes of the collapse. The jury at the inquest into the disaster stated that sufficient care had not been taken in the construction of the works.

In 1864 he established the Hunslet Engine Company, a locomotive manufacture, in Leeds on part of the site of the former Railway Foundry. The company was sold to James Campbell in 1871 for £25,000.

He was employed by the War Office in the 1860s, for the construction of the sea forts at Spithead, as well as Fort Gilkicker and St Helens Fort. In 1867 he was contracted together with George Smith to construct an extension of the Portsmouth Dockyard, which was completed 1877.

== Personal life ==
In 1877 he retired from the contracting and civil engineering business. He was High Sheriff of Northumberland in 1875.

Married twice, he died in Leeds on 6 June 1885.
