= York, Hull and East and West Yorkshire Junction Railway =

Proposed railway line in Yorkshire England

The York, Hull and East and West Yorkshire Junction Railway was a proposed railway line, promoted in the mid 1840s, intended to connect York to the East Riding of Yorkshire, England.

The line was not built, instead an alternative proposal, the York and North Midland Railway's York to Beverley Line gained approval in the York and North Midland Railway (East Riding Branches) (No. 1) Act 1846 (9 & 10 Vict. c. lxv), and was opened in two sections in 1847 and 1865.

== History ==
The railway line, proposed during the Railway Mania, planned to connect to the proposed Leeds and York Railway at York, and serve destinations in the eastern Vale of York and East Riding of Yorkshire. From York the line was to run east to Pocklington, Market Weighton, and Beverley, then by the east side of the River Hull via Weel and Stoneferry south to the new East Docks (Victoria Dock) in Kingston upon Hull. Branches from the line were planned to Selby via Holme upon Spalding Moor from Market Weighton; to Driffield from Holme upon Spalding Moor via a crossing of the Yorkshire Wolds in the vicinity of Nunburnholme and Warter; and a branch to Hornsea running eastwards from a junction off the main line near Weel.

The York, Hull and East and West Yorkshire Junction Railway Company was provisionally registered in 1845, and the line, together with the Leeds and York Railway was supported by the Manchester and Leeds Railway.

The route invaded an area which at that time was exclusively served by the York and North Midland Railway (Y&NMR), and passed through an area which had already been surveyed for a railway by the Y&NMR. In an attempt to preserve its monopoly, in 1845, the Y&NMR began proceedings for bills before Parliament for equivalent lines between York, Market Weighton and Beverley; Market Weighton and Selby; Market Weighton and Driffield (as a line from junctions at Goodmanham and Cranswick); and to Hornsea from a junction at Leconfield; (Note: In the London Gazette announcement the Y&NMR also put forward a line for a railway from the east Dock in Hull, eastwards to Patrington via Hedon. This was similar to the Hull and Holderness Railway proposal, which was enacted in the early 1850s.) The York and Hull company also initiated its bill in 1845, with the line from York to Hull, and its branches to Hornsea, Driffield and Selby.

The Manchester and Leeds company were persuaded to withdraw their support from the rival scheme in exchange for an agreement to make them joint lessors of the Hull and Selby Railway. The Y&NMR's proposals to Parliament were successful, resulting in the York and North Midland Railway (East Riding Branches) (No. 1) Act 1846 (9 & 10 Vict. c. lxv), (Note: York and North Midland Rly. (East Riding Branches) [No.1] Act, 1846 (Cap. 65); An Act for enabling the York and North Midland Railway to make certain branch Railways in the East Riding of the county of York; and for other purposes.) which enabled the construction of line from York to Beverley, opened to Market Weighton in 1847, the remainder being completed in 1865. A second act in 1846 enabled the construction of the Selby to Market Weighton Line.
