= Richard Tomlinson =

British Secret Intelligence Service officer

- Born: 13 January 1963 (age 63); Hamilton, New Zealand
- Education: Gonville and Caius College, Cambridge
- Occupation: Pilot
- Espionage activity
- Allegiance: Britain
- Service branch: MI6
- Service years: 1991–1995
- Rank: Intelligence officer
- Codename: D/813317 (staff number)
- Codename: T (press anonymity)
- Operations: Russia • Bosnia • Iran
- Height: 1.9 m (6 ft 3 in)

Richard John Charles Tomlinson (born 13 January 1963) is a former officer of the British Secret Intelligence Service (MI6). He argued that he was subjected to unfair dismissal from MI6 in 1995, and attempted to take his former employer to a tribunal. MI6 refused, arguing that to do so would breach state security.

Tomlinson was imprisoned under the Official Secrets Act 1989 in 1997 after he gave a synopsis of a proposed book detailing his career with MI6 to an Australian publisher. He served six months of a twelve-month sentence before being paroled, after which he fled Britain. The book, named The Big Breach, was published in 2001 and was subsequently serialised by The Sunday Times. The book detailed various aspects of MI6 operations, alleging that it employed a mole in the German Bundesbank and that it held a "licence to kill", the latter of which was later confirmed by the head of MI6 at a public hearing.

Tomlinson then attempted to assist Mohamed al-Fayed in his privately funded investigation into the death of Diana, Princess of Wales, and al-Fayed's son Dodi. Tomlinson claimed that members of MI6 had considered assassinating Slobodan Milošević, the president of Serbia, by staging a car crash using a powerful strobe light to blind the driver, and suggested that Diana and Dodi might have been killed by MI6 in the same way. MI6 confirmed that plans of that nature had been drafted regarding a different Eastern European official, but that the proposal had been swiftly rejected by management.

In 2009 MI6 apologised for its treatment of Tomlinson, dropped all threat of charges and agreed to unfreeze royalties on his book. Staff at MI6 have been allowed employment tribunals since 2000, and have been able to unionise since 2008.

== Early life ==
Richard John Charles Tomlinson was born in Hamilton, New Zealand, and raised in the nearby town of Ngāruawāhia. He was the middle child in a family of three brothers. His father came from a Lancashire farming family and he worked for the Ministry of Agriculture, and had met his wife whilst studying agriculture at Newcastle University. The family moved to the village of Armathwaite in Cumberland, England, in 1968. The young Tomlinson won a scholarship for the independent Barnard Castle School in County Durham, where he was a contemporary of Rory Underwood and Rob Andrew, who went on to become England rugby internationals. He excelled at mathematics and physics, and won a scholarship to Gonville and Caius College, Cambridge, in 1981.

His fellow student, historian Andrew Roberts, remembers Tomlinson as "a bright and charming undergraduate, popular with the boys for his drinking and sporting prowess, and with the girls for his dark good looks." His friends included Gideon Rachman. Tomlinson completed flying training with Cambridge University Air Squadron and won a Half Blue for Modern Pentathlon. He graduated from the University of Cambridge with a starred First Class honours degree in aeronautical engineering in 1984, and was approached by MI6 shortly afterwards, whose offer he turned down. Following his graduation he took examinations to join the Royal Navy as a Fleet Air Arm Officer, but he failed the medical examination due to childhood asthma. Instead he applied for and was awarded a Kennedy Scholarship, which allowed him to study technology policy at the Massachusetts Institute of Technology with full funding during 1986–7. Following this, he was awarded a prize from the Rotary Foundation, allowing him to study in the country of his choice for a year. Consequently, he enrolled in a political science course at the University of Buenos Aires, where he became fluent in the Spanish language. He continued to pursue his aeronautical interests and qualified as a glider pilot with the Fuerza Aérea Argentina. During 1988–9, Tomlinson worked in Mayfair, London, for management consultancy company Booz Allen Hamilton.

== Military and MI6 service ==
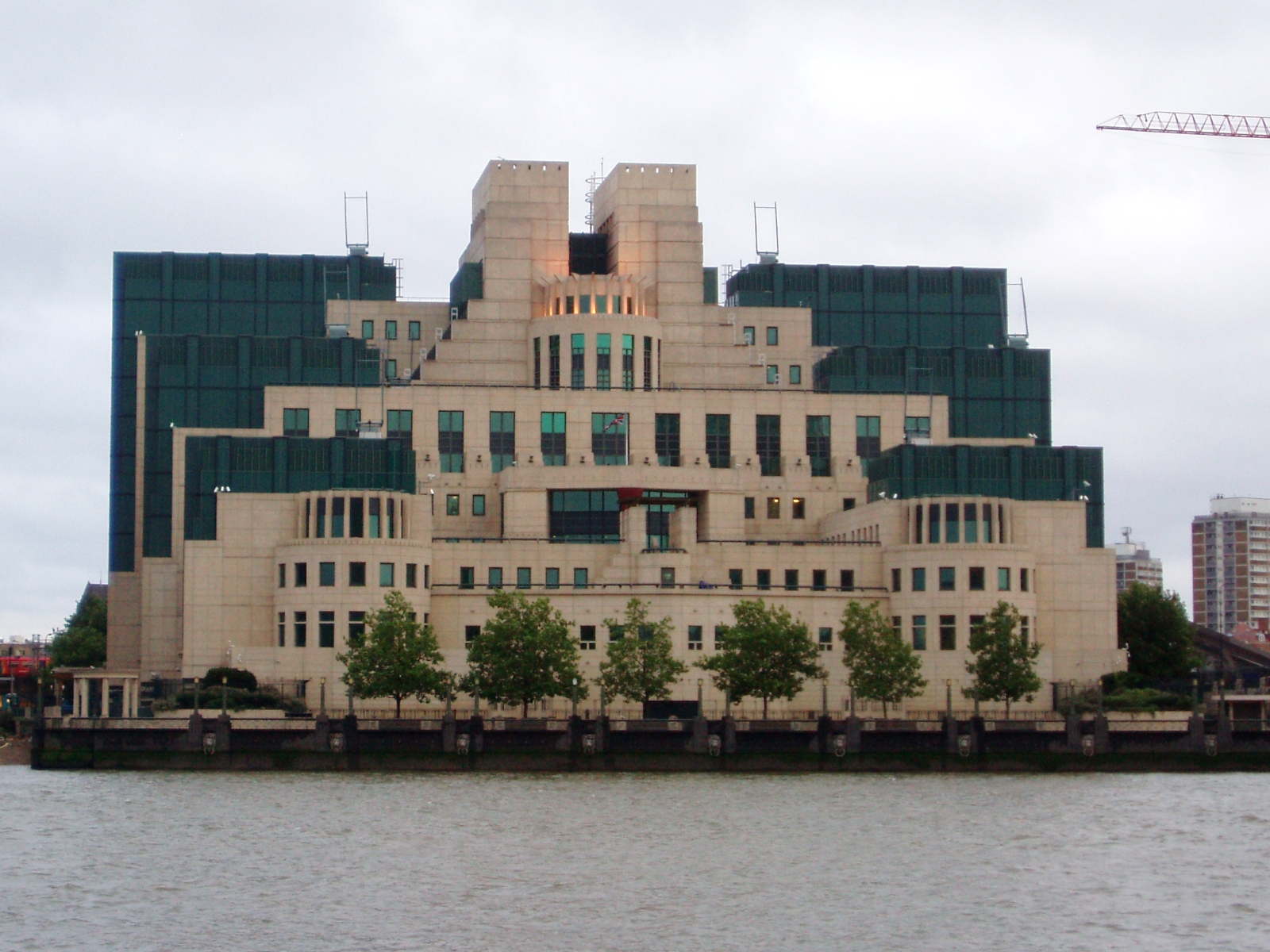
MI6 headquarters at Vauxhall Cross, London

Finding his desk job unsatisfying, Tomlinson joined the Territorial Army in September 1989 and, after passing selection, served as a reservist with the SAS in the Artists Rifles, and then 23 SAS, qualifying as a military parachutist and radio operator. He represented Britain in the 1990 Camel Trophy, competing in Siberia, and crossed the Sahara desert solo on a motorcycle. He enjoyed the experience, subsequently applied to join MI6, and officially joined the Service on 23 September 1991. He completed his training with MI6 and claims he was the best recruit on his course, being awarded the rarely given "Box 1" attribute by his instructing officers, who included Nicholas Langman.

Tomlinson worked in the "SOV/OPS" department, operating during the ending phases of the Cold War against the Soviet Union. He was posted to a diplomatic role in Moscow, and was one of the agents responsible for the retrieval of the Mitrokhin Archive in 1992. From March 1992 until September 1993, he worked in the Eastern European Controllerate of MI6 under the staff designation of UKA/7. Whilst working there, it was discovered that the Conservative Party had been receiving donations from Serbian supporters. In November 1993, he joined the Balkans Controllerate, and was posted to Sarajevo for six months as the MI6 representative in Bosnia during the breakup of the former Yugoslavia. There he was a "targeting officer", with a mission to identify potential informants and gather intelligence. A soldier who escorted Tomlinson to Bosnia described him as a "liability", a "sulk" and "totally unprofessional", although Tomlinson has disputed this.

From 1994 to 1995, Tomlinson worked in the operational counter-proliferation department. His first posting in this capacity was to work as an undercover agent against Iran, where he succeeded in penetrating the Iranian Intelligence Service. He posed as a British businessman, and infiltrated a network of arms dealers that included Nahum Manbar. The British government supplied the Iranians with materials for chemical weapons in order to gain intelligence on Iran's military programme. Tomlinson's description of his Iranian activities are generally considered to be true, due to his personal involvement and knowledge of details that only an insider would know.

== Dismissal from MI6 ==
On 13 May 1994, Tomlinson resigned from MI6, suggesting in his letter of resignation that he had lost the motivation for a career with the organisation. He was later permitted to rescind his resignation.

MI6 dismissed him on 22 May 1995 as he came to the end of his extended probationary period. Tomlinson's probationary period had been extended over the standard six-month duration due to his senior line manager's doubts about his personality. Tomlinson claimed that he had become suicidally depressed following the death of his long-term girlfriend from cancer and that he had been suffering from post-traumatic stress after witnessing violence against a civilian during the siege of Sarajevo, and that MI6 had been ill-equipped to handle his condition. Tomlinson said, "my honesty cost me my job. The 'powers-that-be' decided that despite my impressive results, I lacked a stiff upper lip".

MI6 argued that he was dismissed for "not being a team player, lacking motivation and having a short-term interest in the service", but later conceded that he had experienced a "personality clash" with his senior line manager. Another reason given for his dismissal was for "going on frolics on his own". Tomlinson claims that no formal reason for his dismissal was ever given, and that he was mid-assignment when he suddenly found himself barred from entering MI6 headquarters. Friends suggested that he was sacked after he complained about MI6's "unethical" tactics. Tomlinson argued that his supervisors had unfairly disregarded his personal circumstances. Tomlinson disputed the reasons for and legality of his dismissal and attempted to take MI6 before an employment tribunal. However, MI6 obtained a public-interest immunity certificate from the Foreign Secretary, Malcolm Rifkind. Having no further legal recourse to appeal against his dismissal, Tomlinson left the United Kingdom, and pursued his arguments against MI6 by publishing articles in the international press protesting his treatment, whilst working on a book detailing his career in the Service.

In 1998, the Parliamentary Intelligence and Security Committee recommended that MI6 should be subject to UK employment law. Since 2000, employees of MI6 have had the same employment rights as other British citizens, including written contracts and access to employment tribunals. However, MI6 refused to allow these procedures to be applied retroactively to Tomlinson's case. MI6 have not succeeded in obtaining another PII certificate since the Tomlinson case.

== The Big Breach ==
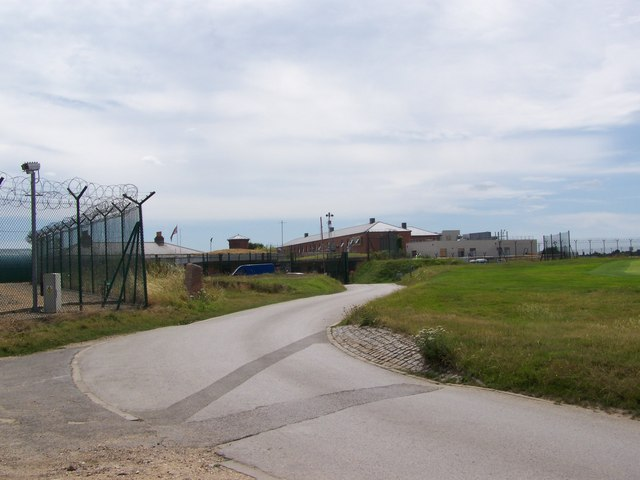
Fort Monckton in Hampshire, which Tomlinson asserts is an MI6 training facility

Tomlinson moved to the Costa del Sol in Spain for 18 months from early 1996. Realising that a disgruntled former spy could be problematic for the agency, the aide-de-camp to the head of MI6 was enlisted to attempt to appease Tomlinson in February 1997. He offered him a £15,000 loan and a marketing job with Jackie Stewart's Formula One racing team, in return for a promise of silence. Tomlinson accepted the offer (he claims under duress) but retained the job for only a few months before he emigrated to Australia, where his younger brother lived.

Tomlinson returned to Britain, and in October 1997 was arrested and accused of breaking the Official Secrets Act 1989, after delivering a seven-page synopsis of The Big Breach to the Australian office of Transworld, a British publisher. On 18 December 1997 he was sentenced to 12 months in prison after pleading guilty.

In August 1998, after serving six months in prison and four months on probation, Tomlinson left the UK to live in exile. He set about completing The Big Breach, which was published in 2001 in Russia. The book alleged that MI6 had infiltrated the German Bundesbank with a mole, and that the Service had a special means of writing in invisible ink. Other revelations were already public knowledge, such as that MI6 recruits are trained at Fort Monckton in Hampshire, and that agents in the field often use the cover of being a journalist.

After the Court of Appeal of England and Wales ruled in his favour, the book was made available in the UK. Following the publication, the British Government obtained a High Court order to confiscate all proceeds from the book, on the grounds that the government owned the copyright to anything written by Tomlinson. In September 2008, MI6 ended all legal objection to the publication of The Big Breach, released the proceeds from the publication to Tomlinson, and admitted that the organisation's previous legal actions against him were disproportionate. It still refused to reinstate him or compensate him for the loss of his career and pension. Since 2009, Tomlinson has been able to travel freely to the UK.

=== Reception ===
The Economist criticised the "mess" that MI6 had made in failing to handle the Tomlinson case properly: "Recruiting Mr Tomlinson looks like a bad mistake, and his sacking seems to have been clumsily handled."

Jimmy Burns, reviewing the book for the Financial Times, speculated that it was plausible that "MI6's senior management realised they had made a terrible mistake in recruiting someone who thought that espionage was just one big adventure." He concluded, however, that the book "left me with the feeling that the spooks in Whitehall could have avoided a great deal of adverse publicity by agreeing to Tomlinson's original proposal: an employment tribunal held in camera."

Former President of South Africa Nelson Mandela reacted angrily to Tomlinson's accusation in the book that he had a long-standing relationship with MI6, describing it as a "disgraceful fabrication". Tomlinson removed the references to Mandela in the British edition of the book, conceding that Mandela was probably unaware that the officials with whom he spoke were affiliated with MI6.

== Other alleged breaches and assertions ==
=== List of MI6 agents ===
In May 1999, a list of 116 alleged MI6 agents was sent to the LaRouche movement's publication Executive Intelligence Review, a weekly magazine which published it online. Its names included Andrew Fulton, who had recently retired, Christopher Steele, David Spedding and Richard Dearlove. MI6 biographer Stephen Dorril explained that most of the names were "light-cover" sources who worked out of embassies or missions posing as diplomats. Dorril argued, "it is well known that rival intelligence networks know who these people are and accept them." MI6 claimed that Tomlinson had originated the list, which was something he had previously threatened to do, although he denied responsibility for it, and MI6 were unable to substantiate their accusation.

Tomlinson wrote, "If MI6 had set out to produce a list that caused me the maximum incrimination, but caused them the minimum damage, they could not have done a better job." He also said, "It mystifies me why MI6 gave the list credibility. If they were really worried about the safety of their agents they could have denied it." After The Sun newspaper called Tomlinson a "traitor" and published his email address, he received death threats, and fearing for his life, went into hiding for a time. Government officials later conceded that the list did not originate from Tomlinson.

=== Diana, Princess of Wales ===
During 2008, Tomlinson was a witness for the inquest into the deaths of the Princess of Wales and Dodi al Fayed. He had suggested that MI6 was monitoring Diana before her death and that her driver on the night she died, Henri Paul, had been an MI6 informant, and that her death resembled plans he saw during 1992 for the assassination of Yugoslav President Slobodan Milošević, using a bright light to cause a traffic accident.

At the Coroner's Inquest into the death of the Princess, on 13 February 2008, speaking by video-link from France, Tomlinson conceded that, after the interval of 16 or 17 years, he "could not remember specifically" whether the document he had seen during 1992 had in fact proposed the use of a strobe light to cause a traffic accident as a means of assassinating Milošević, although use of lights for this purpose had been covered in his MI6 training. On being told that no MI6 file on Henri Paul had been found, Tomlinson said that it "would be absurd after 17 years to say I can positively disagree with it, but... I do not think the fact that they did not manage to find a file rules out anything either". He said he believed MI6 had an informant at the Paris Ritz but he could not be certain that this person was necessarily Henri Paul.

== Post-MI6 activities ==
In August 1998, Tomlinson left the United Kingdom for France, and shortly afterwards moved to New Zealand. Later that month he was deported from the United States, and in October 1998 he moved to Switzerland, before being expelled in June 1999 after the Swiss authorities described his presence there as "undesirable". He moved to Germany until he was hounded out by officials, whereupon he moved to Italy. In 2001 he left Rimini in Italy, where he had been working as a waiter and a snowboarding instructor, for the south of France near Cannes where he worked as a yacht broker for BCR Yachts. From 2006 to 2007, Tomlinson maintained a series of blogs detailing his treatment. His Riviera home was raided by police in 2006.

In 2007, government lawyers decided not to prosecute him for publishing The Big Breach. The Crown Prosecution Service said there was no real prospect of conviction in a jury trial, which would reveal "sensitive matters". In 2009, MI6 agreed to allow Tomlinson to return to Britain, unfreeze royalties from his book and drop the threat of charges if he agreed to stop disclosing information about MI6 and speaking to the media. According to The Sunday Times, MI6 also apologised for its "unfair treatment" of him.

He now lives permanently in France and has retrained as a professional pilot.

== Personal life ==
In 1998, Tomlinson was described as possessing "the air of slight arrogance that goes with good looks, a hard-trained body and a sharp intellect". The Geneva press reported that he had a "perfect command of French".
