= Joe Murray (British Army soldier) =

British soldier and TV personality (born 1963)

- Born: 1963 (age 62–63); Glasgow, Scotland
- Occupations: Soldier, actor
- Years active: 2002–present (as actor)
- Spouse: Penny Murray (?-present)
- Children: 4
- Military career
- Allegiance: United Kingdom
- Branch: British Army
- Service years: 1979–2002
- Rank: Sergeant Major
- Unit: Parachute Regiment
- Conflicts: The Troubles; Sierra Leone Civil War; Kosovo War

Joe Murray (born 1963) is a former British Army soldier and television personality from Glasgow, United Kingdom. He is best known for his role on ITV programme, Bad Lads' Army.

== Army life ==
Murray joined the British Army in 1979 after he left school because of a lack of available jobs in Glasgow at the time. While training he was selected to join the Parachute Regiment, following in the footsteps of his father who also served in the Parachute Regiment. He was assigned to 1 Para Regiment and served with them in deployments in Northern Ireland, Sierra Leone and Kosovo. During his service, Murray reached the rank of sergeant major. Murray served with the British Army until 2002 when he retired.

== Television work ==
In 2002, after he had retired from the army, Murray attended a casting audition for the ITV reality programme, Lads' Army. He was given the part of one of the corporals in charge of one of the two sections in the programme after receiving training in how to behave as a 1950s National Service corporal. In the programme he was referred to as "Corporal Murray" and became better known to the public as such, despite his real sergeant major rank. Murray appeared in all four series of Bad Lads' Army and also maintained the character of Corporal Murray when being interviewed by journalists. Murray has expressed his support for a reintroduction of National Service after his work on Bad Lads' Army, a viewpoint that was not shared by fellow Bad Lads' Army corporal, Richard Nauyokas.

== Personal life ==
Murray is married to Penny and has four daughters. He currently lives in Somerset.
