= Leeds and York Railway =

Proposed railway line in England

Coordinates: 53.8885°N 1.2645°W

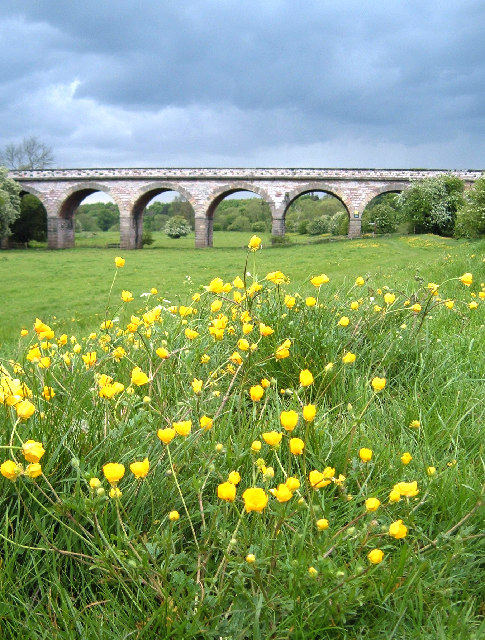
Tadcaster Viaduct, southwest approaches. Completed before the Y&NMR abandoned construction of its line in 1849. (2005)

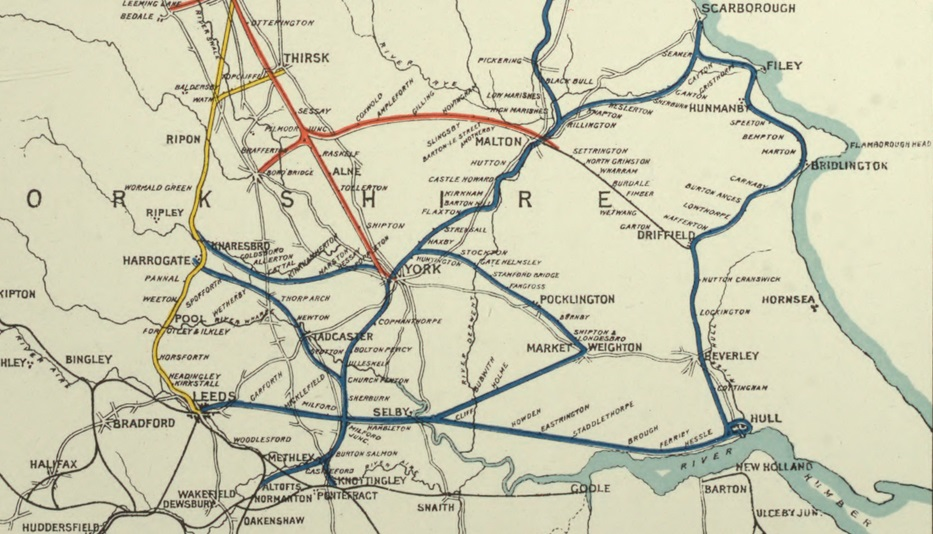
Lines of the York and North Midland Railway (in blue) as of 1854, showing the potential for a shorter route from Leeds to York via either Thorp Arch or Tadcaster. A cut-off was eventually opened in 1869 between Micklefield and Church Fenton, south of Tadcaster and the lines proposed in the 1840s

The Leeds and York Railway was a proposed railway line, promoted in the mid 1840s, intended to connect York and Leeds. The line lost a significant promoter, the Manchester and Leeds Railway in 1845/6 as a result of a non-competition arrangement between that company and the York and North Midland Railway.

The York and North Midland Railway successfully promoted a rival line in the same session of Parliament, and obtained an act of Parliament, the York and North Midland Railway (Leeds Extension) Act 1846, for its construction in 1846.

The only part of either scheme that was ever constructed was the Tadcaster Viaduct, built by the Y&NMR on a short spur from the Y&NMR's existing Church Fenton to Harrogate branch. This was completed by 1848 before the Y&NMR decided to abandon construction of the line.

== History ==
=== Leeds and York Railway ===
The Leeds and York Railway was promoted in the 1840s, during the Railway Mania; the line formed an alternative route from Leeds to York, starting in Wellington Street (Leeds), passing Seacroft, Thorner, Clifford Moor, and crossing the River Wharfe near Thorp Arch continued via Walton, Syningthwaite, Bilton, Hutton Wandesley, Rufforth and Acomb to York.

The line was 6.5 miles (10.5 km) shorter than the existing route between the two cities (York and North Midland and Leeds and Selby lines). An associated scheme the York, Hull and East and West Yorkshire Junction Railway was also proposed, connecting towns in the East Riding of Yorkshire; together they represented a potential strong competitor to George Hudson's railway network in Yorkshire.

In 1845 the Leeds and York company gained the support of the Manchester and Leeds Railway, which decided to take up shares in the company on the condition that the line would use the station of the proposed West Riding Union company; the company also determined to support the Leeds and York in their obtaining an act of parliament.

In late 1845 the York and North Midland Railway company and the Manchester and Leeds company entered into a non-competition arrangement as part of an agreement between the two firms on the leasing of the Hull and Selby Railway. Part of the agreement was that the M&L would withdraw its support from both the York-Leeds and York-Hull schemes. The new agreement with the Y&NMR was contradictory to the previous one with the proponents of the Leeds and York and York and Hull schemes, and the board of the M&L withdrew their support and connection to the scheme in November 1845. The Leeds and York refused an offer to return the shares, and the M&L was required to take up 5,000 £25 shares.

Rival schemes between Leeds and York were also proposed in the same period, including the Leeds, York and Midland Railway, and the Leeds Extension of the York and North Midland Railway, both of which followed a route via Aberford and Tadcaster a few miles to the south of the Leeds and York company's plans.

=== York and North Midland Railway Leeds extension ===
The Y&NMR applied for an act of Parliament for a railway over its proposed route in 1845, starting from a junction with the Leeds and Selby Railway near Cross Gates and continuing roughly north-east to make a connection with the Y&NMR's Church Fenton to Harrogate line south of Tadcaster. The route then ran north for approximately 1 mile, before bearing east across the River Wharfe to meet the York and North Midland's main line at Copmanthorpe, and thence to York.

York and North Midland Railway (Leeds Extension) Act 1846
- Act of Parliament
- Parliament of the United Kingdom
- Long title: An Act for enabling the York and North Midland Railway Company to make a more direct Line of Railway between York and Leeds.
- Citation: 9 & 10 Vict. c. lxxxix

Dates
- Royal assent: 26 June 1846

The Y&NMR's line was successful in Parliament over the rival Leeds and York Railway scheme. The York and North Midland Railway (Leeds Extension) Act 1846 (9 & 10 Vict. c. lxxxix) was obtained, (Note: "An Act for enabling the York and North Midland Railway Company to make a more direct Line of Railway between York and Leeds." (Victoria 9/10, Cap.89, 1846).) for a line of 17.2 miles (27.7 km) with power to raise capital of £360,000 and a further third in loans.

John Towlerton Leather was contracted to build the Tadcaster-York section, a viaduct at Tadcaster was completed before the work was abandoned after the end of the Railway Mania. (See §Viaduct.)

In its 1849 report to shareholders the company reported:

The line from York to Tadcaster and Leeds was forced upon the Company, as a protective measure in 1845 [...] in order to prevent others doing so. The portion of this line between York and Tadcaster was commenced soon after the obtaining of the Act in 1846, and has been proceeded with to a considerable extent. An expense of between £30,000 and £40,000 has already been incurred thereon, and a further outlay to that amount will be necessary to complete it [...] The outlay already incurred may be reckoned in the interim among the extortions to which existing Railway Companies were then compelled to submit, to save their property from being wholly confiscated. If it be the wiser course to defer the portion of the line between York and Tadcaster, it is certainly so to defer that between Tadcaster and the Leeds and Selby Line. The junction at Leeds may probably be desirable at some future day.

— York and North Midland Railway (1849, pp. 22–23)

In 1849 the Y&NMR applied for deviation of and abandonment of the original section from Tadcaster to York (Copmanthorpe), passed as part of the York and North Midland Railway Act 1849 (12 & 13 Vict. c. lx). (Note: "An Act for enabling the York and North Midland Railway Company to divert their Railways between Market Weighton and Beverley and Copmanthorpe and Tadcaster, all in the County of York; and for other Purposes." (Victoria 12/13, Cap. 60, 1849).)

No line was completed along the route, either by the Leeds and York, York and North Midland or other companies. A shorter route from Leeds to York was opened in 1869, via a cut off from Micklefield to Church Fenton. (Note: From the Leeds and Selby Line to the former York and North Midland Railway Line to York.)

==== Tadcaster Viaduct ====
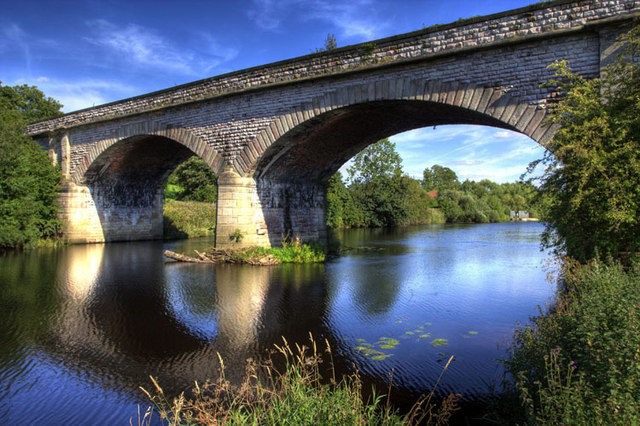
Tadcaster Viaduct (2007)

The Tadcaster Viaduct (also known as the Virgin Viaduct, or Virgin Bridge) was constructed as part of the northern section of the Leeds-York Line.

The viaduct was constructed of 11 arches, 7 west of the river, 2 east of the river, and 2 wider arches across the River Wharfe; made of magnesian limestone with millstone grit arch voussoirs. Earthworks were constructed for a triangle junction connection to the Harrogate-Church Fenton line immediately northwest of Tadcaster railway station; the viaduct crossed the river upstream and north of the town.

From 1882 or '83 to 1955 there was a siding across the viaduct which was used to supply corn and later coal to Ingleby's Mill on the east bank of the river. (Note: (1890) "Ingleby & Son stand on the north bank of the Wharfe. Originally an old soke and grist mill, it was occupied many years by the late Mr. John Allenby [...] Mr. Rishworth next conducted the business, and retired in 1869, when he was succeeded by Mr. J. A. Ingleby, who purchased the property at Lord Londesborough's sale in 1873. [...] in 1879 he enlarged the premises, and commenced working the first complete roller mill in England. In 1889 a new warehouse was built, with silos holding 6,000 quarters of wheat. The wheat on arrival is emptied direct from the railway trucks through warehouse separator, and distributed automatically to the silos or any other part of the mill.") After 1901 the Mill was converted to a power station for the Tadcaster Electricity Company. The siding, known as the Ingleby's Mill branch closed in 1959. In 1980 the viaduct was acquired by the town council from British Rail. The structure was listed in 1985.
