= Richard Nauyokas =

British television personality (born 1962)

- Born: 9 December 1962 (age 63); Grantham, Lincolnshire, England
- Military career
- Allegiance: United Kingdom
- Branch: British Army; Royal Air Force
- Service years: 1980–2002 (British Army) 2009- present day (Royal Air Force)
- Nickname: Nooky
- Conflicts: Kosovo War; Bosnian War
- Other work: TV personality

Richard Carlton Nauyokas (born 9 December 1962) is a British television personality, who between 2002 and 2006 appeared as a military instructor in several United Kingdom reality television series which re-created British National Service military training from the 1950s. A former professional soldier with the British Army, he now runs a motivational training consultancy.

== Early life and military career ==
Nauyokas was born and brought up in Grantham, in the county of Lincolnshire. His father was a United States Air Force airman based at RAF Alconbury, and his mother was English from Grantham. After his father had returned to the United States. He received his early formal education at Spitalgate (Church of England) Primary School, and The Boys' Central School in Grantham, where his attendance was poor. After 22 years of military service during which time he undertook duty as a driver, radio operator, Physical Training Instructor and Military Training Instructor, serving in Kosovo, Bosnia and Germany, he retired from the British Army in 2001 with the senior non-commissioned rank of Warrant Officer Class 2 (Squadron Sergeant Major).

Nauyokas subsequently served as a Royal Air Force reservist non-commissioned officer, including a period on the staff at RAF College Cranwell in 2012. As of 2025, he is still a reservist in the Royal Air Force holding the rank of Sergeant.

== Television career ==
After retiring from the Army he attempted to commence a career as an actor. After repeated auditions for parts with little success he unsuccessfully applied for the role of Sergeant-Major in the 2002 in a new ITV historical military reality television series Lads Army, but was given instead the role of one of the corporals in charge of one of the two sections in the programme, after himself receiving training as a 1950s British Army non-commissioned officer. He joined the show as corporal in charge of 1 Section, a role he continued to play during the subsequent Bad Lads Army series in 2004, 2005 and 2006 alongside Joe Murray.

Nauyokas has also appeared on television as a fitness instructor in the reality television show "There's Something About Miriam" (2004) and as an interviewee in "Greatest Ever 80s Movies" (2008).

== Film career ==
In 2021, Nauyokas appeared in the World War I film The War Below The film is a historical drama, set in 1917, about a group of miners who are tasked with tunnelling beneath no man's land, to set explosives below the German front line in an effort to break the stalemate of the Battle of Messines. (1917). Nauyokas appears alongside Tom Goodman-Hill and Andrew Scarborough.

== Business career ==
In 2005 Nauyokas set up 'Not All Bad, Ltd.', a company based in Bourne, Lincolnshire, providing motivational and Team building physical training courses for a variety of clientele, ranging from private individuals to corporate entities, and working with H.M. Prison Service in the rehabilitation of young offenders and prison inmates.
