= Fort Monckton =

Historic military fort in England; intelligence service facility

Coordinates: 50°46′36.43″N 1°8′0.37″W

- Gosport, England
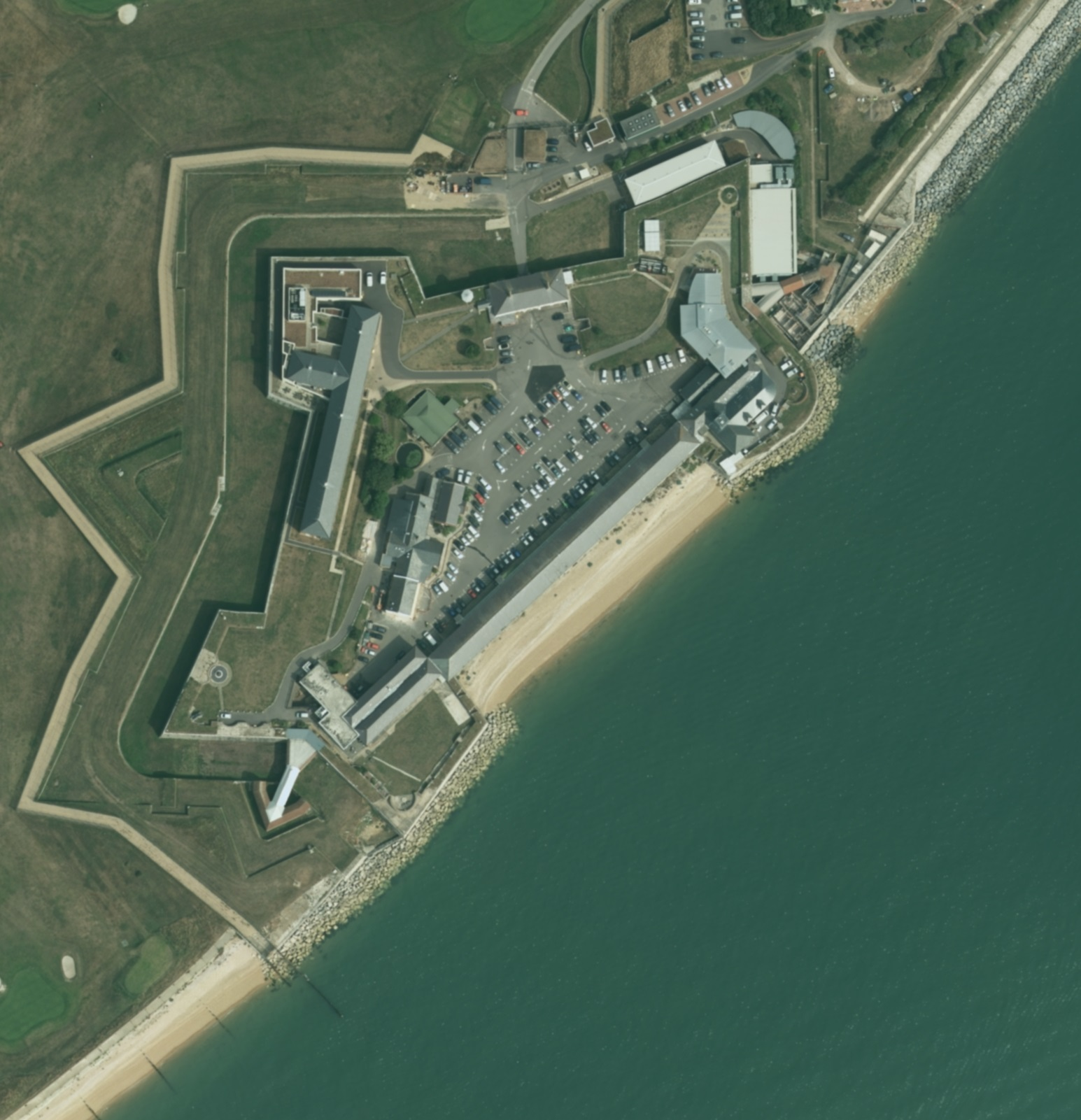
- Aerial view of the fort

Site information
- Type: Battery, later training site
- Condition: Complete

Location
- Location within Hampshire

Site history
- Built: 1779-1790
- In use: 1790-1956 (as battery); 1956-present (as training site)

Fort Monckton is a historic military fort on the south-east shoreline of the Gosport peninsula, Hampshire. Built on the ruins of Haselworth Castle to protect Portsmouth Harbour at the start of the American War of Independence, it was rebuilt in the 1880s as a Palmerston fort. It now houses a training centre for the intelligence services.

== History ==
=== Haselworth Castle (1545-1556) ===
A Henrican fort, variously titled Hasleworth or Haselford, was erected on the site in 1545. The fortification was only lightly armed, and is depicted on the Cowdray Print as a circular keep with an outer wall. The castle was abandoned in 1556, only 11 years after construction, as a result of a review by the Marquis of Winchester. A 1587 map indicates that "Hasleworth Castle beaten downe by King Philip", potentially in reference to a story about the castle being demolished after it failed to grant Phillip a salute in 1554. The ruins continued to be marked on maps until 1788. There is some dispute as to the exact location of the fortification, but the modern site of Fort Monckton is considered the most probable. No maps produced after the completion of Fort Monckton mark the ruins.

=== Construction (1779-1790) ===
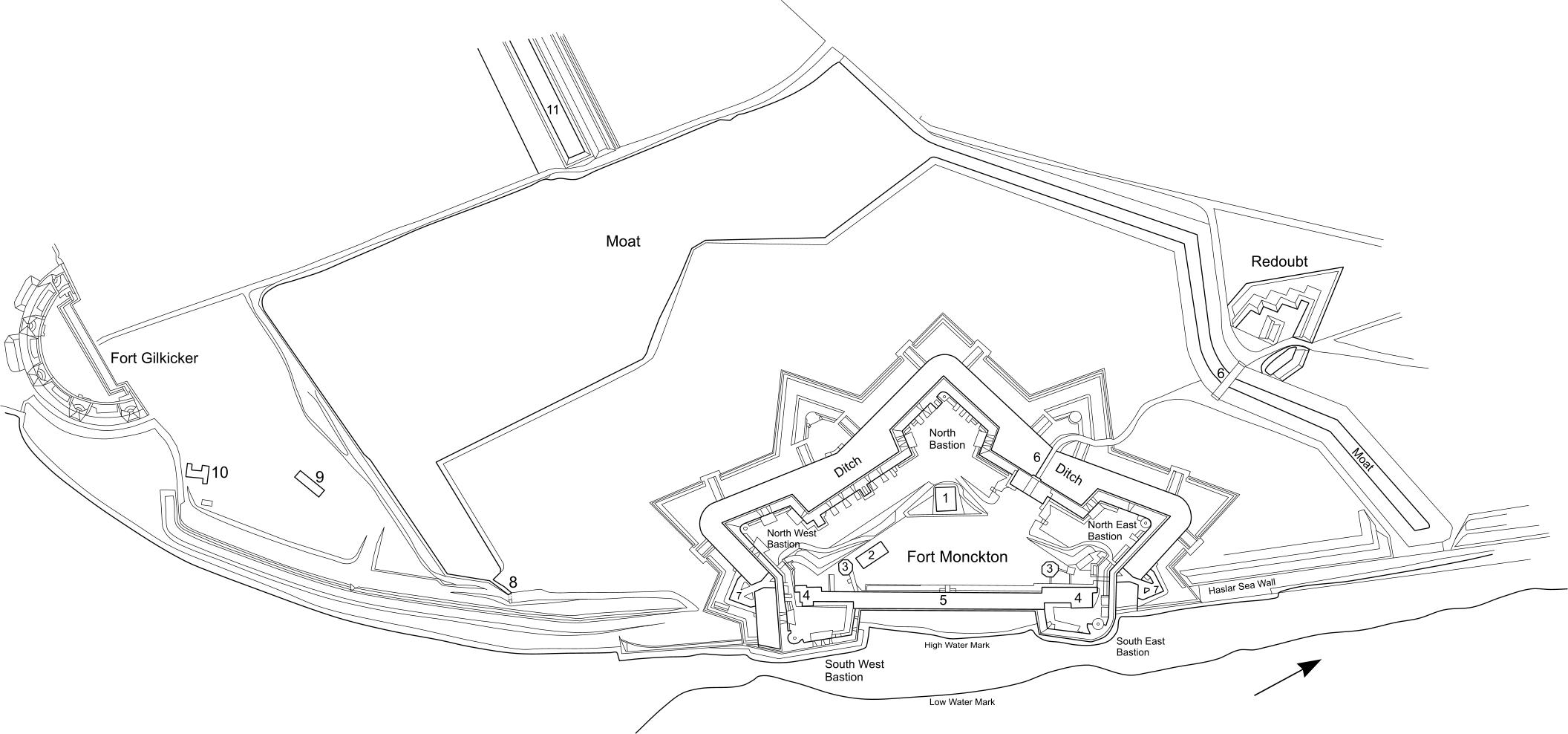
A plan of the fort drawn from original sources

Despite several previous plans which noted the exposed nature of Portsmouth harbour to attack, it was not until the American War of Independence that construction of a defensive fort was started on the site in 1779. The Governor of Portsmouth Lt. General Sir Robert Monckton told his Commanding Engineer, Lt. Col. John Archer to draw up plans for the defence of Stokes Bay. In 1779 the Gilkicker Sea Mark was demolished to provide clear ground for a new temporary fort, which consisted of a 6 feet (1.8 m) thick earth bank, supported by brushwood fascines. So poor was the structure that the tents of the billeted soldiers blew away in 1780, while the site was so exposed that it was used as a sighting point by ships entering Portsmouth harbour. Archer proposed a new permanent structure, which was accepted in July 1780. Known as The Fort at Gilkicker, construction started in September 1780. However, using civilian and often supplemented by conscript labour, construction speed was slow and the design came under criticism from Charles Lennox, 3rd Duke of Richmond, who in 1782 was appointed as Master-General of the Ordnance. After Archer was removed from his post in 1783 construction was taken over by engineer officer James Glenie, who himself was removed in 1784. Construction again slowed, and after much more controversy in its design and naming, it was renamed Fort Monckton after the now deceased Robert Monckton, and completed in 1789 or 1790, just before the French Revolution of 1793.

=== Battery (1790-1956) ===
Some additional work expanding the barracks took place in the early 19th century, to add officer's quarters. A sea wall was added along the beach, along with a northeastern redoubt. Considered too small and old to dominate the key anchorage of Spithead by the 1860 Royal Commission on the Defence of the United Kingdom, they instead opted to build the new Fort Gilkicker and give Fort Monckton a minor defensive role in the defence of Portsmouth harbour. Very little was done to modify the fort during this period apart from reforming the gun positions to take the new armament. The fort was often used as a viewing platform for the fleet reviews as illustrated in the editions of the Illustrated London News for 1856 and 1858.

In 1875, experiments were carried out at Stokes Bay with Wilde's Electric Light. The light was placed on the South-west bastion of the fort. More experiments continued with Lime Light and signalling lamps for shore-to-ship communication in July 1875. The fort was incorporated into the defences of Stokes Bay as an adjunct to the Stokes Bay Lines; the Royal Engineers moved into the fort in 1878 to train in the use of naval mines and later search lights.

In 1879, torpedo experiments were carried out at Stokes Bay and part of this consisted of a mock attack on Fort Monckton. This sham attack was recorded in the Illustrated London News. The fort was an ideal viewing platform for the observers and members of the public. In 1880, another demonstration of naval warfare took place in the vicinity of the fort. In 1880, the 4th Company of Submarine Miners of the Royal Engineers occupied the fort. They moved out in 1884 to Fort Blockhouse, leaving Fort Monckton as accommodation for the R.E. Militia during the annual training. Anti-aircraft searchlights were located in the fort during World War 1 and an anti-aircraft artillery unit was quartered in the fort during World War 2.

Virtually abandoned after World War II, the fort was however retained by the Ministry of Defence and remained armed until the abolition of coastal artillery in 1956.

=== No.1 Military Training Establishment (1956-present) ===
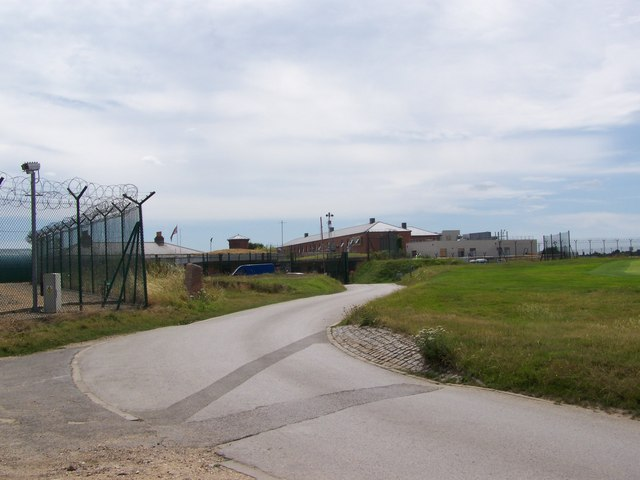
Entrance to Fort Monckton in 2008

Fort Monckton now remains the only fort in the Portsmouth area owned by the Army, as opposed to the Royal Navy. Located next to the Stokes Bay Golf Course, much of the original fort still exists including the bastions, sea facing casemates, guard room, one of the caponiers and the ditch.

The fort retains its original drawbridge and is additionally protected by modern razor wire security fencing, CCTV cameras and high intensity lighting. The site has been heavily modified with modern offices and accommodation added on and around it, and a portion of the artificial lake was filled in during the 1970s.

Now referred to as No.1 Military Training Establishment by the British Army, it is occupied by the Ministry of Defence and houses the Secret Intelligence Service (MI6) Training Section where SIS officers as well as officers from allied services and agents are trained. During the Cold War this included Stay-behind agents from continental Europe. In his book The Big Breach, former MI6 officer Richard Tomlinson states that Fort Monckton is now the SIS's field operations training centre, where both basic and advanced field training is given to SIS personnel, and liaison training with other services including the Special Air Service and Special Boat Service is undertaken.

== Armament ==
In 1872 the outdated armament was a mixture of smoothbore guns: two 8-inch, nine 32pr, two 24pr, six 18pr and two 12pr with two 7-inch rifled breech-loading guns. It was proposed to change this to five 7-inch R.M.L. guns and six 64pr R.M.L. guns. In 1886 the armament mounted was: eleven 8-inch S.B. five 7-inch R.B.L. guns and six 64pr R.M.L. guns. By 1891 the armament had been reduced to six 64pr R.M.L. guns, two on ordinary sliding carriages and the other four on standing carriages. These were mounted two to each of 1, 2 and 5 Bastions. By this time accommodation within the fort was for eight officers with 70 NCOs and men. There were also quarters for 15 married soldiers.

== See also ==
- Swan Island (Victoria), site used for training by the Australian Secret Intelligence Service
