= Fort Gilkicker =

Fort in Gosport, Hampshire, England

Coordinates: 50°46′27.12″N 1°08′26.88″W

- Gosport, England
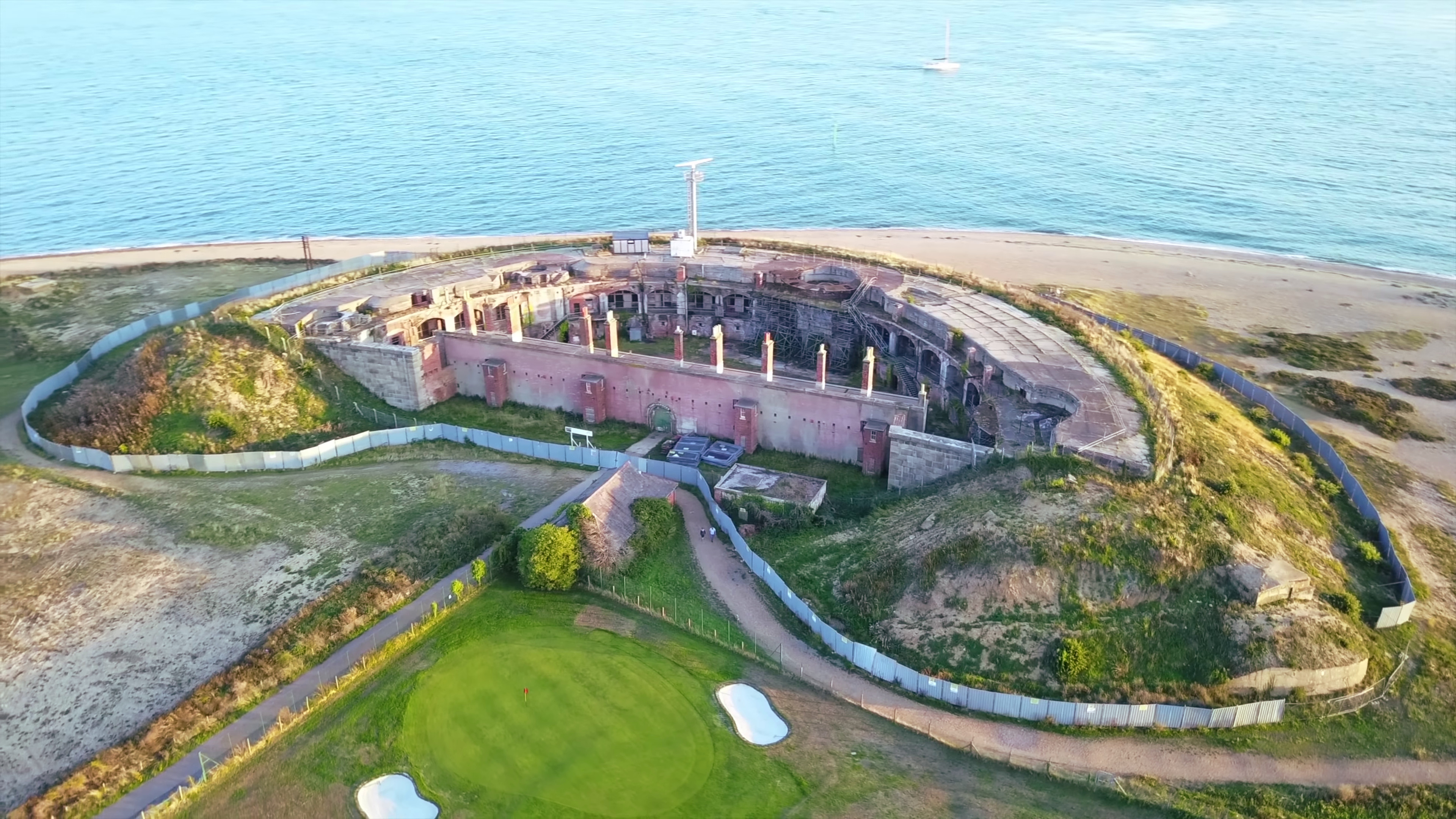
- Fort Gilkicker in 2018

Site information
- Type: Battery
- Condition: Complete, but in disrepair

Location
- Location within Hampshire

Site history
- Built: 1853-1858 (original); 1863-1871 (modern); 1902-1906 (modification)
- In use: 1858-1956 (as battery); 1956-1999 (as storage)

Fort Gilkicker is a historic Palmerston fort built at the eastern end of Stokes Bay, Gosport, Hampshire England to dominate the key anchorage of Spithead. It was erected between 1863 and 1871 as a semi-circular arc with 22 casemates, to be armed with five twelve-inch guns, seventeen ten-inch guns and five nine-inch guns. The actual installed armament rather differed from this. In 1902 the RML guns were replaced by two 9.2-inch and two six-inch BL guns, and before the First World War the walls were further strengthened with substantial earthwork embankments. The fort was disarmed in 1956 and used for storage until 1999. On 28th July 2022, the fort was sold at auction for just under £1.4 million and planning has been granted for 26 homes. Since then a massive restoration project has been underway. Fort Gilkicker is a Grade II* Listed Building.

Gillkicker Point is clearly marked at "Spit Head" on early regional maps by Robert Morden, where it is depicted as a distinct headland rather than a watercourse in the Solent. In modern usage, the compound word 'Spithead' refers more broadly to the sea area of the eastern Solent.

== Layout ==
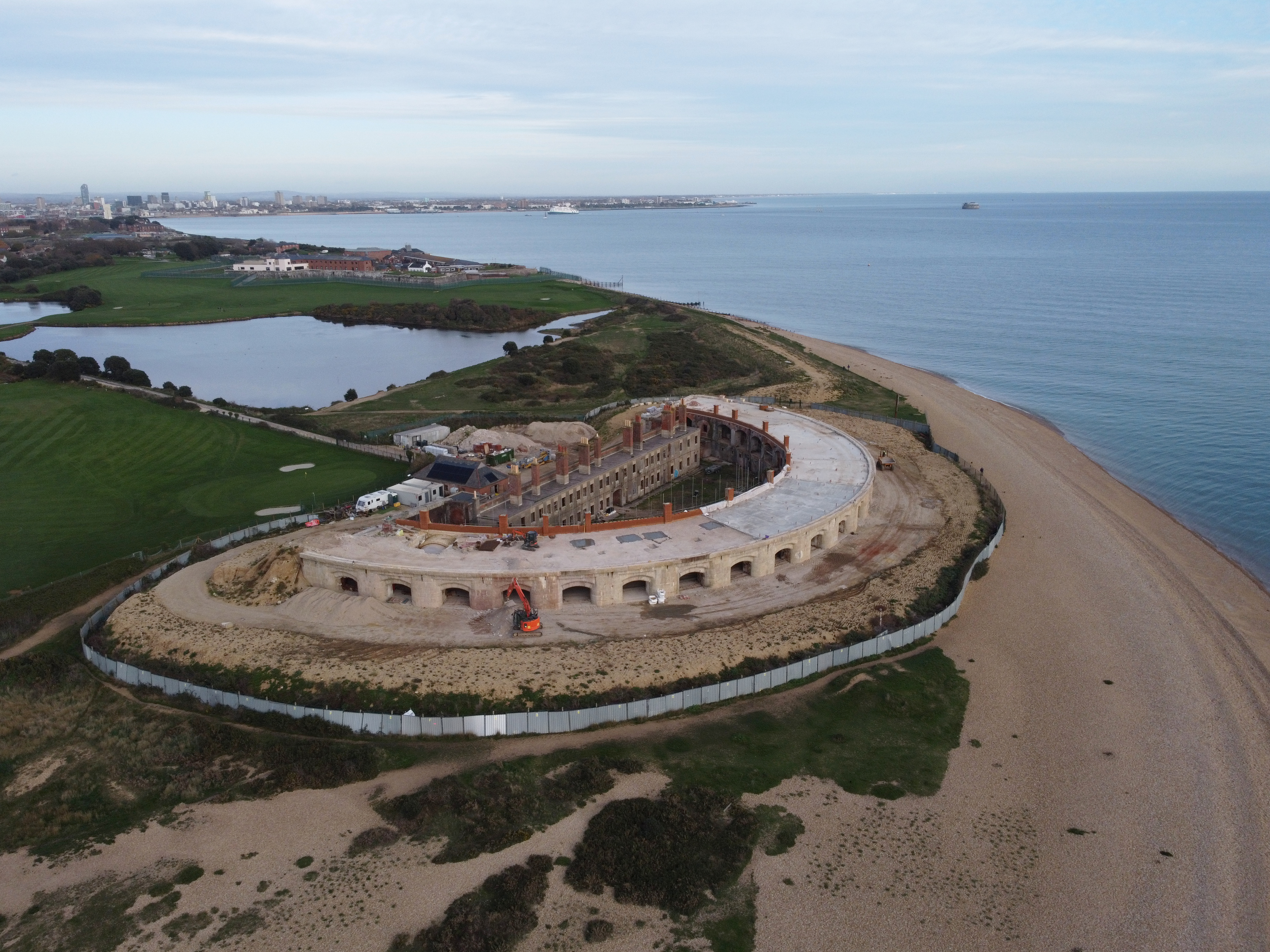
Fort Gilkicker (viewed from the west) undergoing restoration in 2024.

Each of the 22 gun casemates on the main gun floor consists of a brick vaulted chamber behind a granite face 14 feet (4.3 m) thick. Each gun fired though an armoured embrasure with a shield hung on a massive shield frame. To the rear of each gun casemate is the barrack room for the gun crew with space for folding barrack room beds and a fireplace. The barrack rooms open on to a verandah, or walkway, that connects all of the barrack rooms. Beneath the gun casemates are a series of magazines appropriated for shells and cartridges. Vertical lifts from the shell and cartridge passages open onto each gun casemate allowing efficient supply of ammunition for the guns. The magazine floor was lit by oil lamps placed on lamp trolleys running on rails through lamp tunnels from the parade. Steps lead up from the verandah and parade to the upper battery that consisted of five large open gun emplacements with expense magazines between. The rear, or gorge, of the fort is closed by a two-storey barrack block that was originally occupied by the officers. It included officers' bedrooms, the officers' mess with kitchen and pantry, a field officer's quarters, and officer's servant's quarters. At each end was an artillery store. At the western end was the laboratory for filling shells and cartridges. The entrance to the fort through the centre of the barrack block opens onto the central parade. Outside the fort is an artillery store and a smith and fitters shop.

== History ==
=== Original battery (1853-1863) ===
The first fortifications on Gilkicker Point were constructed as an auxiliary battery to Fort Monckton and consisted of an earthen rampart for 11 guns firing through embrasures cut through the parapets. The battery was a distorted quadrilateral in shape with a long gorge (or rear) a short sea facing rampart with two flanking faces. The front faces were protected by a ditch which was flanked by musketry caponiers at the angles. The rear was closed off by a brick wall with a barrack for officers at its centre. The battery was heavily criticised by James Fergusson, who eventually became the Treasury representative on the Royal Commission in to the defences of the United Kingdom, set up in 1859. In his paper ‘The Peril of Portsmouth’ he stated that the battery was in danger of collapse under the weight of its own guns and could easily be captured by a small force landing in the bay as it could offer little resistance. As a result, the Defence Committee proposed a new work to replace it.

=== Construction (1863-1871) ===
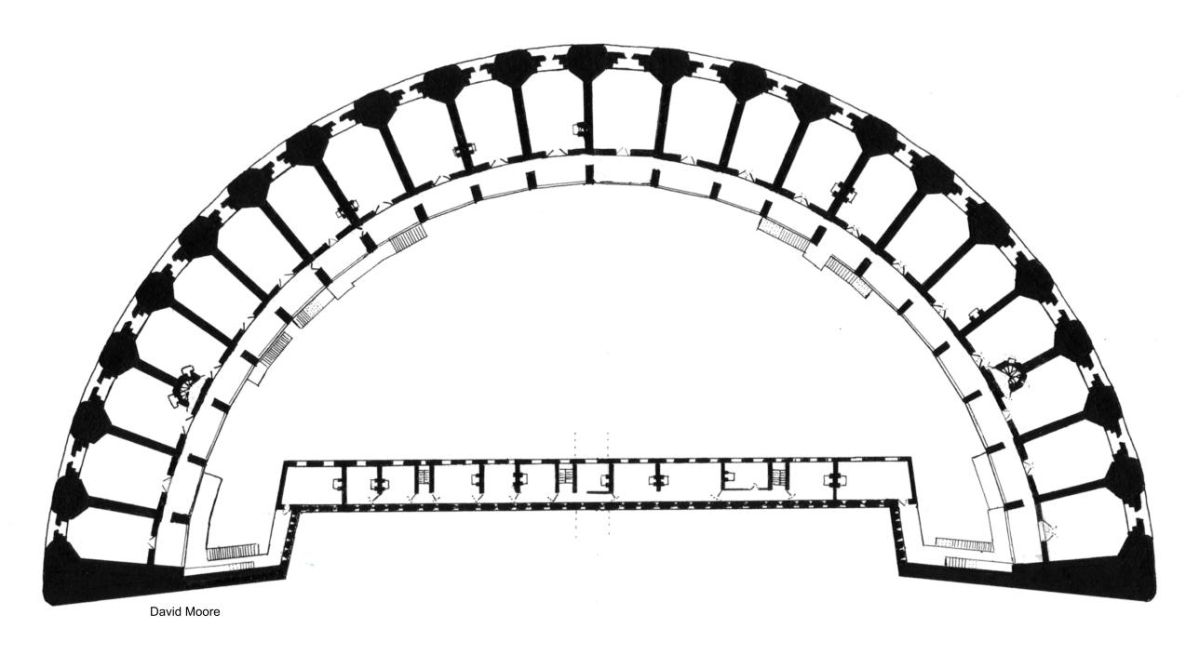
A plan of the New Fort Gilkicker showing the original layout of the gun casemates with the barrack block behind

The current Fort Gilkicker was constructed between the years 1863 and 1869 at Stokes Bay, Gosport. Its purpose was to defend the deep water anchorage at Spithead and to protect the western approach to Portsmouth Harbour. The fort was begun by a contractor who failed in November 1863 early in the stages of the construction and a renowned civil engineer, John Towlerton Leather who was already involved in the construction of the great sea forts at nearby Spithead, was asked to complete the Fort at Gilkicker. His yard was nearby at Stokes Bay, the site of which eventually became the Stokes Bay Submarine Mining Establishment. The new Fort Gilkicker was conceived as a curvilinier fort for 26 guns on one level firing through armoured embrasures with a barrack closing the rear. It faced in a more easterly direction that its predecessor and its principal role was to direct fire on Sturbridge Shoal and to the flanks were to bear upon Spithead and Stokes Bay. The design for the fort was altered slightly and it was completed in 1871 for 22 guns in casemates with five heavier guns in open positions on the roof. The estimated cost of Fort Gilkicker in 1869 was £61,395, the actual cost on completion being £58,766 (equivalent to £5,984,800 in 2025).

=== First version (1871-1906) ===
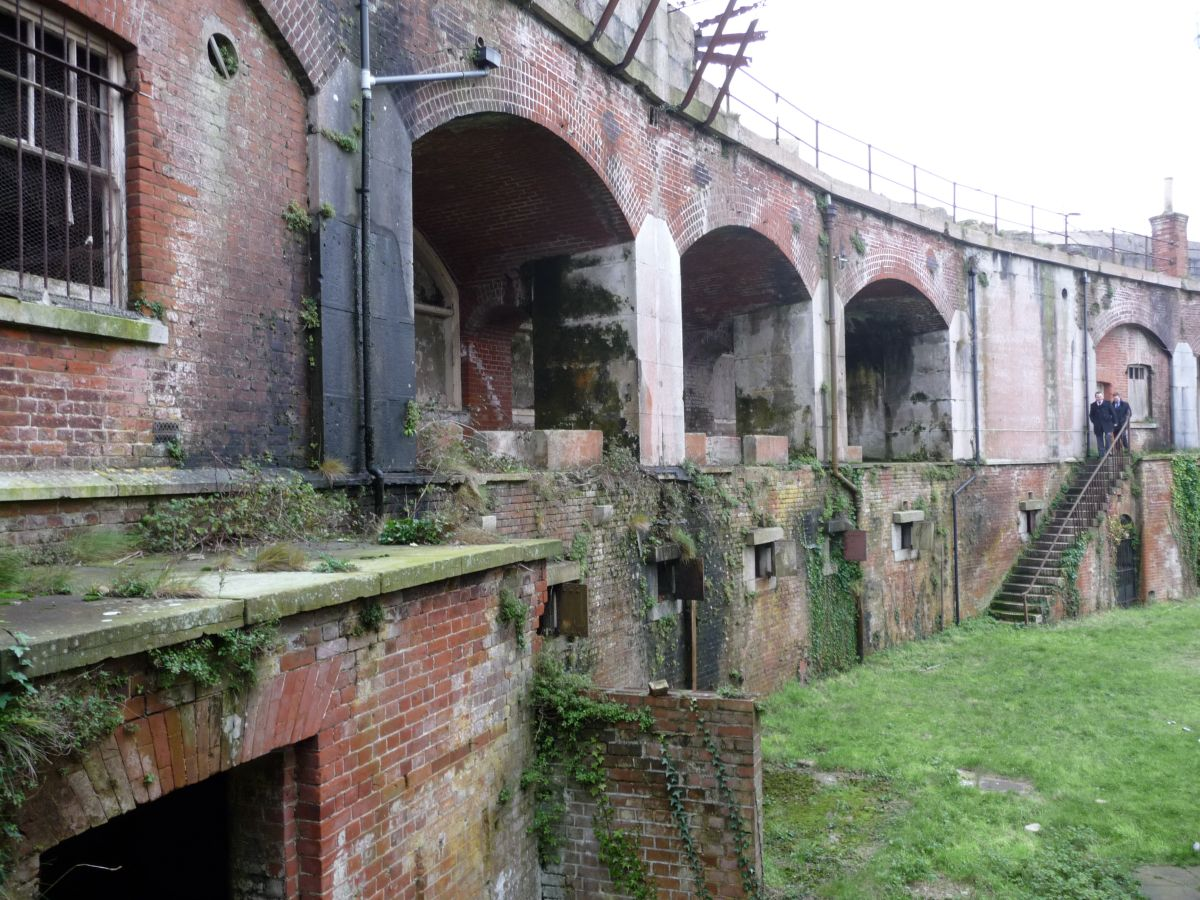
A view from the parade at Fort Gilkicker showing the rear of the gun casemates

The approved armament was:- seventeen 10-inch R.M.L. 18 tons Lower tier casemates; five 9-inch R.M.L. 12 tons Lower tier casemates. Five gun positions were constructed in the upper battery, three for 11-inch guns of 25 tons on ‘C’ pivots in positions 2, 3 and 4 and two for 12-inch guns of 25 tons on ‘A’ pivots in positions 1 and 5. The site was used for militia training in 1871, and submarine mining experiments in 1879. Additional guns were added through the 1880s. In 1891 two of the positions for 11-inch guns on the roof were altered as lookout and the guns removed.

=== Second version (1906-1956) ===
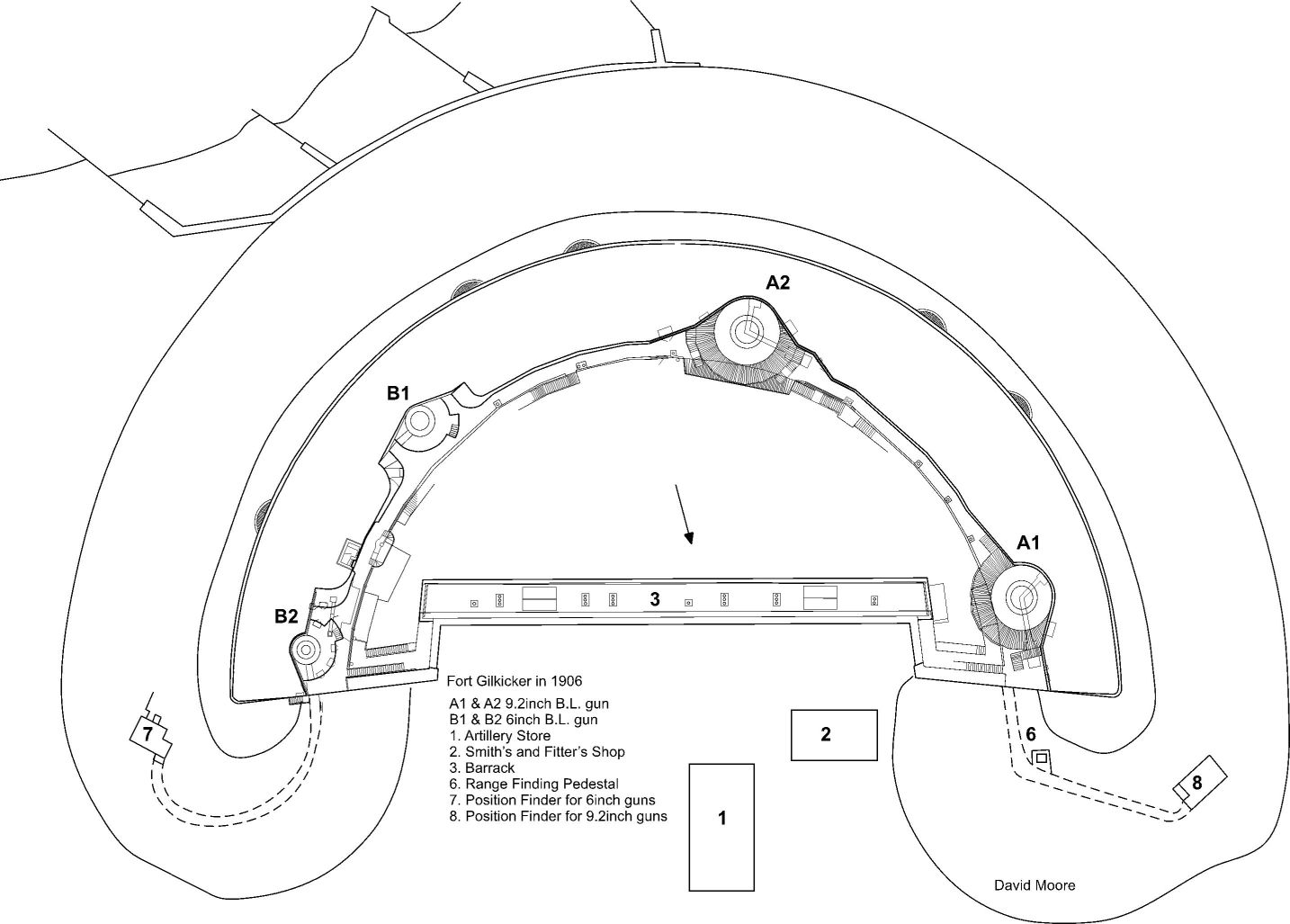
Plan of Fort Gilkicker in 1906 showing the final breech loading armament

In 1898 Colonel Montgomery recommended that Gilkicker be modified to take the latest Breech Loading guns in place of the 10-inch and 9-inch RMLs on the lower gun floor. The upper battery was to be completely remodelled to take two of the latest 9.2-inch BL Mark X guns on barbette V mountings with two 6-inch BL Mark VII guns on CPII mountings for closer range support. The 9.2-inch BL was to counter armoured ships up to a range of 6,000 yards (5.5 km; 3.4 mi) whilst the 6-inch BL was for use against unarmoured ships, ships attempting to block channels by sinking in them and against ships trying to break through booms (blockers and boom smashers). The authority for the alteration was given in 1902. The work was completed in October 1906 at an estimated cost of £16,000 and an actual cost of £19,671 (equivalent to £2,068,000 in 2025). The contractor was William Hill of Gosport. The work included the rebuilding of the magazines, gun emplacements and barrack block. The magazines were altered to accommodate 1,000 6-inch B.L. shells and cartridges and 500 9.2-inch BL shells and 1,000 cartridges. As part of this work the whole of the exterior granite wall of the fort was covered with earth and the front ditch filed to protect the shell and cartridge stores. Position finding cells were built into this bank at each end of the fort. each worked in conjunction with a transmitting station exterior to the fort, that for the 6-inch guns at Fort Monckton and that for the 9.2-inch guns at No.4 battery of the Stokes Bay Lines.

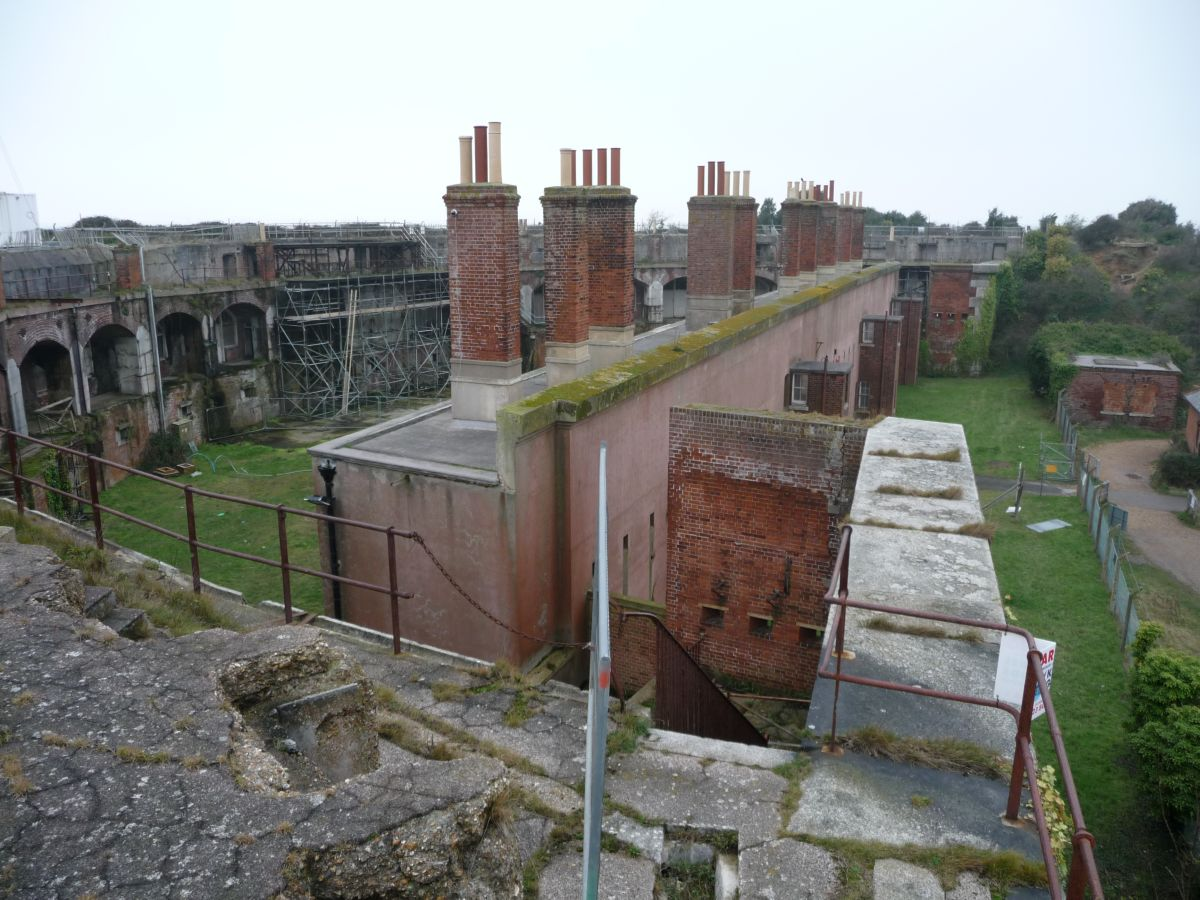
A view from the east looking across the barrack block with the gun casemates beyond

The Owen Committee decided in 1905 that the heavy armament of Gilkicker, Stokes Bay and Browndown were only of use against ships that had forced the outer defences and such ships would be deterred by the inevitable damage they would incur. The 9.2-inch guns at Gilkicker and Browndown were therefore superfluous. The 6-inch guns at Gilkicker and at No.2 battery of the Stokes Bay Lines were also superfluous and ineffective. These guns were to be removed. A 1906 armament return shows that the 9.2 inch and 6-inch guns were still mounted but to be reduced. Corrections to August 1907 show them as dismounted. The barrack block was altered 1908-1910 by converting it to married quarters for Royal Engineers at nearby Fort Monckton. In 1916 the fort was armed with an early type of anti-aircraft gun, a 3-inch quick fire gun on a high angle mounting. This was placed in the eastern 9.2-inch B.L. position on top of the fort. Trinity House had a small observation post on Fort Gilkicker after 1939.

During World War II the fort was briefly armed with a 40mm Bofors gun and Gun Laying Radar was fitted outside the fort to direct the guns of the nearby Gilkicker Anti-Aircraft gun site. In the build-up to D-day a signals unit occupied the fort and during the Normandy landings on 9 June over 1,000 signals were recorded for the day needing routing to over 1,300 addresses. Later an average of 800 signals to almost 1,000 addresses were routed via Gilkicker. The fort was the site of artillery exercises in 1953.

=== Later use (1956-1999) ===
In 1956 Coast Defence was abolished and the fort was then used by the Ministry of Public Building and Works as a plumbers workshop. Later a substantial wooden signalling station was built on top of the fort, which was continuously manned by former RN Signalmen, and used to monitor movements of vessels and assist in RN signalling training. Vessels transiting The Solent in the vicinity could also check their compass errors using the nearby navigational transit towers of Gilkicker and Kickergil. The fort was used by HMS Dolphin, based at Fort Blockhouse as storage for Submarine spares from 1959, with Fort Brockhurst staff maintaining it. The adjacent beach was closed to the public during this period.

In November 1986 Hampshire County Council bought the fort, but not its surrounding earth bank. The fort was used as a building materials store from 1987 until 1999.

=== Disuse (1999-2022) ===
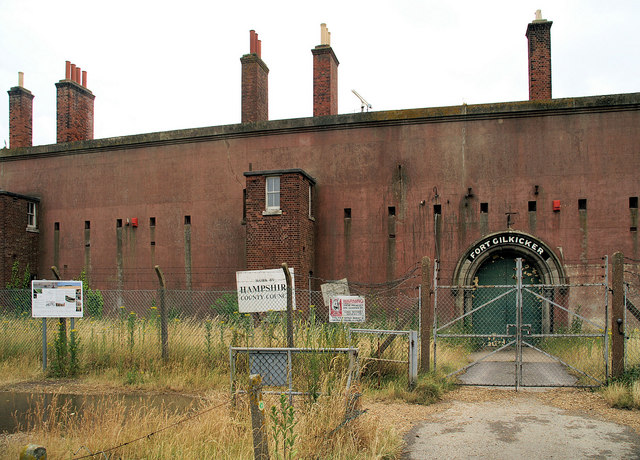
The main entrance

The Phoenix Trust proposed to convert the fort to apartments in 1999, but pulled out in 2001. A similar redevelopment scheme was posited by Try Homes from 2003 to 2006, and Assett Hawk from 2007 to 2012. The latter did engage in some work on the site clearing overgrowth in 2012, but none of the schemes came to fruition. As of 2015 the fort was on the Buildings at Risk Register, being in an extremely poor condition due to a lack of maintenance and numerous break-ins. An urban explorer took a series of photographs of the interior in 2016, demonstrating the scale of the damage.

In 2016, the fort was earmarked for restoration and conversion to modern apartments by Fort Gilkicker Developments Ltd, and work began on site with the erection of a fence, however these plans were again dropped in 2018 due to financial issues, and the fort was put on sale again in November 2019 with a guide price of 5 to 5.5 million pounds. The site suffered a major fire in March 2019.

=== Conversion (2022-present) ===
On 28 July 2022, it was sold to developers for £1.38 million, with plans to turn it into 26 homes - 22 in the former gun emplacements and four larger ones in the barrack block. As of 2025 work to restore the fort was well underway. As part of this process, large quantities of earth have been removed, revealing the fort's granite exterior for the first time in over 120 years. It is hoped that the work will be completed by the summer of 2027.

== Bibliography ==
- Moore, David (2011). Solent Papers No. 5: Fort Gilkicker (2nd ed.). David Moore. ISBN 9780951323427. ISBN 978-0-9570302-1-3
