= Stokes Bay Lines =

Coordinates: 50.783443°N 1.152397°W

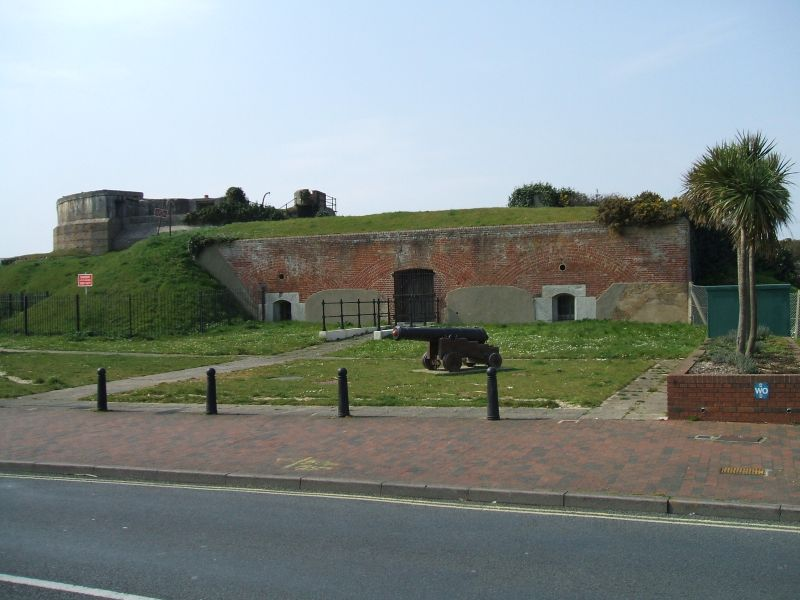
East facing gun casemates at No.2 Battery Stokes Bay Lines at Gosport

The Stokes Bay Lines were part of the great Victorian fortification of Portsmouth Harbour, Hampshire, England, under Lord Palmerston. In 1857 Major Jervois had proposed a complex system of moats (ditches), ramparts and batteries to close off the gap between the new fort at Fort Gomer, and the earlier fort at Fort Gilkicker, and Fort Monckton. This defensive moat was to become the "Stokes Bay Lines".

== Construction and purpose ==
The Stokes Bay Lines were constructed to protect the southern approaches to Gosport from a beach landing at Stokes Bay. The Lines consisted of a ditch with a protecting rampart that ran from the Browndown Batteries in the west to the glacis of Fort Monckton in the east. Four batteries were constructed to protect the various branches of the ditch. No.1 Battery also protected the road to Browndown. No2 Battery held the main sea-facing armament for protecting the deep water anchorage at Browndown Point and also had a casemated battery of guns to fire eastwards along the main branch of the ditch towards Alverbank. No.3 Battery, at the end of Jellicoe Avenue (then Village Road) held a battery of guns to fire westwards towards No.2 Battery. No.4 Battery was an isolated work behind the redan that protected the railway to Stokes Bay Pier. No.5 Battery was the easternmost one consisting of a D-shaped rampart with associated expense magazines and gun emplacements. In 1878 the Royal Engineers diverted the River Alver into the Stokes Bay moat at No.2 Battery. This was to ensure that there was always sufficient water within the defensive ditch. The level of water within the ditch was controlled by a large sluice adjacent to Number 2 battery whilst penstocks at various points along the ditch allowed precise control of the water levels. When the Stokes Bay Lines were completed by 1870 the peninsula of Gosport was effectively secured against attack from the west thereby protecting Portsmouth with its harbour and dockyard. The cost of constructing these lines was calculated in a report of 1869 to be £75,120.

== Armament ==
No.1 Battery
The first armament consisted of eight 8-inch Smooth Bore guns firing through embrasures. In 1886 the armament lists show that they were to be replaced with two 7-inch 82cwt R.B.L. guns on Dwarf Traversing Platforms mounted on A pivot racers. In 1891 they were in place.
No.2 Battery
This was an island surrounded by the ditch supplied with water from the River Alver. Access was over a fixed bridge from No.1 Battery. The first armament was 8-inch S.B. guns firing along the moat towards No.3 Battery and in the right face casemates which fired to the west towards the rear of the Browndown Batteries. The two main sea-facing emplacements were first armed with 68prs then with 64pr R.M.L. guns. The armament lists of 1886 show that the smooth bore guns had been replaced with twelve 7-inch 82cwt R.B.L. guns and the two 64pr R.M.L. guns on the main sea-facing emplacements were to be updated with two 7-inch 7-ton RMLs on 6 ft parapet mountings.
No.3 Battery
This was also armed with 8-inch SB guns and four 7-inch 82cwt. R.B.L. guns on Dwarf Traversing Platforms were in place by 1886. Two fired along the ditch towards No.2 Battery and two protected the glacis in front of the ditch. The No.1 gun was removed by 1891.
No.4 Battery
This was designed for four 8-inch SB guns mounted in pairs to fire down each branch of the moat. The 1886 armament list shows that these had been replaced with four 7-inch 82cwt. R.B.L. guns on Dwarf Traversing Platforms.
No.5 Battery
This had a mixed armament of 68pr and 8-inch smooth bore guns. The 1872 proposals called for replacements of nine 7-inch R.B.L. guns. and 1886 four remained in place.

== The Stokes Bay batteries today ==
Nothing remains of the rampart and moat that protected the rear of the Browndown Battery, west of No.2 Battery. Half of No.1 Battery was demolished in the 1930s when the Browndown Road was widened. A portion of it remains to the south of the road with much of the concrete revetments and parapets still visible in the gardens of the chalets. The tunnel connecting No.1 Battery to No.2 Battery still exists in the gardens of the chalets. The expense magazines and gun emplacements have been demolished.

No.2 Battery is a grade II listed building and it is the best preserved of the Stokes Bay Batteries. Gosport Borough Council purchased the Battery in 1932 from the Home Office for £1,500. In 1933 the parade of the site became a caravan park and in 1939 the Council moved their records from the town hall to the Battery for safe storage. During World War Two the military used the battery. In 1947 it was being used by the Special Armament Development Establishment (S.A.D.E.) based in Fort Gomer. In 1950 the Battery was in use by the 7th Royal Tank Regiment Amphibious Wing. The Military agreed the release of the battery in November 1951. The moat around it was filled in 1956 leaving the channel connecting the River Alver to the sea intact.

In 1982 Gosport Council converted the casemates and magazines of no.2 battery into a nuclear bunker (Civil Defence Command Post) at a cost of £30,000. When this idea was abandoned the battery was left vacant until a local volunteer group opened the east facing casemates in 1994 as a Summer Exhibition Centre. The centre gun embrasure was converted to a doorway. The west casemates have had their wooden partitions removed allowing them to be used for storage and parking for the chalets. The two 6-inch gun emplacements are intact on top of the battery but are not accessible. The concrete pits for the Moncrieff carriages can still be seen beneath the later 6-inch B.L. emplacements. In 2011 Gosport Borough Council agreed the use of the casemates as a small museum by the Historical Diving Society.

Nothing of No.3 battery remains. No.4 Battery has been completely destroyed. The site is a stable and paddock for horses. The ditch has been filled.

From 1950 the ditch of the Stokes Bay Lines was filled because of complaints from residents of mosquitoes and stagnant water. The section from No.2 Battery to No.3 Battery was filled first so that the Stokes Bay Road and promenade could be widened. The final section to be filled was that from No.3 Battery as far as No. 4 Battery.

The site of Battery 5 has been used by the Royal Naval Physiological Laboratory and then as Qinetiq Dive Test Centre. It is currently derelict and earmarked for housing development. No.5 Battery is a scheduled ancient monument. The original rampart is mostly intact and the expense magazines survive.
