= Walton Academy, Grantham =

Secondary academy in Grantham, Lincolnshire, England

Walton Academy

Location
- Harlaxton Road; Grantham, Lincolnshire, NG31 7JR; England; 52°53′52″N 0°39′23″W

Information
- Type: Secondary academy
- Established: 1966
- Department for Education URN: 136624 Tables
- Ofsted: Reports
- Head teacher: Jess Leonard
- Gender: Co-ed
- Age: 11 to 18
- Enrolment: 773
- Website: https://www.walton-ac.org.uk/

Walton Academy, formerly Walton Girls' High School is a co-ed secondary school, in Grantham, Lincolnshire, England. It is situated in the south-west of the town near the A607 junction with the A1. The school accepts approximately 135 children a year. In September 2019, the school saw its first boys enter in year 7, previously boys were only in the sixth form.

== History ==
The school opened on its present site in 1966, with construction started in 1964. It took its name after one of the early townships of Grantham - Spittlegate, Houghton, and Walton. It was known as Walton Girls' County Secondary School and was the third purpose-built new secondary school to open in Grantham.

Walton was formerly the Girls' Central School on Agnes Street, off Castlegate. The equivalent Boys' Central School became the co-educational Central School at Manthorpe, in 1978. The former Girls' Central School building, between Agnes Street and Castlegate, became the Stepping Stones Nursery, an annex of Grantham College.

The Girls' Central School was not a secondary modern school, and required a good result in the eleven-plus exam to be admitted. It was similar to a technical school in its admittance procedure. When a new site for the school was planned, the site's position was supported by parents, provided it remained single sex.

On 14 October 1977 the school hosted BBC Radio 4's Any Questions? - the first time it had been staged in Grantham. The panel host was David Jacobs, and the guests were Sally Oppenheim, Austin Mitchell (newly elected MP for Grimsby), Steve Race (originally from Lincoln) and the author Alan Garner.

The school became a specialist school in Performing Arts in 2002. It was awarded a second specialism in Applied Learning in December 2006, and a third, Languages, in April 2009. The school became eligible to apply to have a sixth form, and the first sixth form students started in September 2008.

=== Sixth form ===
The school had initially had a small sixth form, for under 20 students, teaching Art, English and Biology at A level. A sixth form building, incorporating a theatre, was officially opened in June 2010.

=== Headteachers ===
Previous head teachers include Rosalind Gulson OBE. She received her OBE in the 2006 New Year Honours.

- Jess Leonard 2020–present
- Caroline Saxelby 2011 - 2020
- Rosalind Gulson OBE 1983-2011
- Marian Isaac (1970-1983) 1969-83
- Nina Hewitt 1966-69

== School site ==
Facilities, on a single site, include a sports field.

Additions to the original school building include a Modern Foreign Language block, a maths block of two classrooms, a suite of four maths classrooms and a design technology laboratory, a suite of four specialist Science laboratories, a purpose built Performing Arts studio and PE changing rooms.

== Curriculum ==
The curriculum at Key Stage 3 for 11- to 14-year-old pupils covers the National Curriculum subjects. For English, Mathematics and Science pupils are taught in ability groups, as is French in Year 8 and Year 9. Ability groups are reviewed annually and changes are made in each pupil's best interest following a review of her work.

Design Technology includes separate courses in Food. Art includes disciplines of Drawing and Painting, and Textiles. Walton's course of study for 14- to 16-year-olds at Key Stage 4 has a number of GCSE examination subjects which have to be taken by all: English (including English Literature), Mathematics, Science, Citizenship, Religious Studies and ICT. Pupils also take core Physical Education and Careers Education, which are not examined. The pupils also choose other subjects to add to this core. English, Mathematics and Science are taught in ability groups; all other subjects are taught to mixed ability groups. Subjects vary slightly from year to year.

The Sixth Form teaches both BTEC and GCE 'A' Level subjects, some of which run in collaboration with the town's grammar schools.

== Extra-curricular activities ==
Pupils take musical and artistic activities, sport, where they compete with local regional teams, and participate in a Maths Challenge, Young Enterprise scheme, public speaking and citizenship events. Visits at home and abroad help Languages, History and PE study.

== Academic performance ==
Walton Academy, like most schools, performs better academically at GCSE than many comparable coeducational schools. The school gains GCSE results better than most comprehensive schools in Lincolnshire, and is only surpassed some comprehensives in rural areas.
