= Lads' Army =

British television series

- Also known as: Bad Lads' Army (2004); Bad Lads' Army: Officer Class (2005); Bad Lads' Army: Extreme (2006)
- Genre: Reality
- Voices of: Kevin Whately (2002); Dennis Waterman (2004–2006)
- Composer: Daniel Pemberton
- Country of origin: United Kingdom
- Original language: English
- No. of series: 4
- No. of episodes: 32

Production
- Running time: 60 minutes (inc. adverts)
- Production company: Twenty Twenty

Original release
- Network: ITV
- Release: 3 June 2002 – 29 August 2006

Lads' Army (known in later series as Bad Lads' Army, Bad Lads' Army: Officer Class and Bad Lads' Army: Extreme) was a reality game show that constitutes a historically derived social experiment. Shown on ITV, the series is based on the premise of subjecting today's delinquent young men to the conditions of conscripts to British Army National Service of the 1950s to see if this could rehabilitate them.

The narrator for the first series was Kevin Whately, then Dennis Waterman took over until the show ended in 2006. Within each series a small number of the recruits have either walked out (after a 24-hour cooling off period), or been ejected. The majority of the remaining recruits claimed some benefit from the experience, with some choosing to enlist in the real British Army following their time on the show.

== Format ==
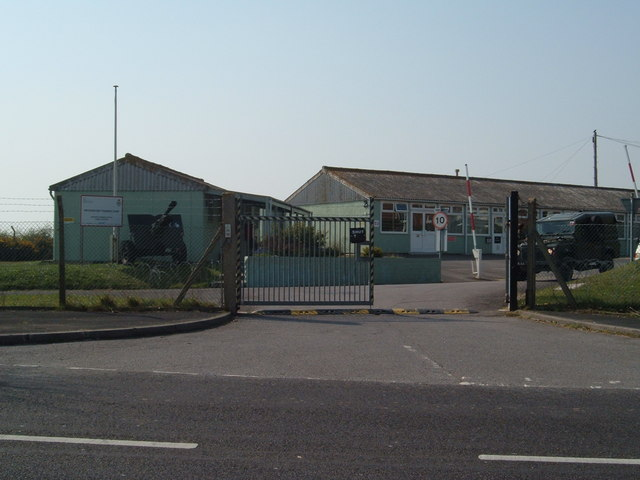
Browndown Training Camp in Gosport, home of Lads' Army and Bad Lads' Army: Officer Class

The programme format is relatively simple. The recruits are issued period uniforms and equipment and fed, quartered and trained according to the standards of the era. Their free time is limited to visits to the NAAFI with period refreshments and facilities. The recruits form a single platoon made up of two sections, each under the care of a section commander, either Richard Nauyokas or Joe Murray. In series three, Nauyokas was replaced by Glenn Thomas (who appeared as the Company Sergeant Major in series two), although he still appeared as a relief corporal. During training the sections compete against each other, building a sense of competition but also of teamwork and loyalty. Success brings modest rewards. Praise is given for whole-hearted attempts at tasks. The NCOs and officers running the training are all, or have been, professional British soldiers.

Each series had a slightly different format to its predecessors, although the theme of 1950s military training is common to all series. The 3rd series (known as Bad Lads' Army: Officer Class) had the volunteers train to become officers while the 4th series (known as Bad Lads' Army Extreme) had the volunteers train to become paratroopers.

== Series ==
The main filming location for series one was Browndown Training Camp at Lee-on-Solent.

=== Series 2 (Bad Lads' Army, 2004) ===
After the filming of the series, Michael Lowes suffered from clinical depression after facing indecent exposure charges, and was found dead in his home from an apparent suicide in 2010, at age 28. SGT Alistair Rae, the platoon sergeant for Montgomery, Churchill and Pegasus Platoons, died in November 2020 at the age of 62 due to complications from COVID-19, as did contestant Marcus Birks in 2021, at the age of 40.

The main filming location for series two was at New Zealand Farm Camp on Salisbury Plain.

=== Series 3 (Bad Lads' Army: Officer Class, 2005) ===
The main filming location for series three was again at Browndown Training Camp at Lee-on-Solent.

=== Series 4 (Bad Lads' Army: Extreme, 2006) ===
Series four was filmed at the Royal Navy Cordite Factory, Holton Heath, in Dorset. However, for the series, it was named 'Sandford Army Camp'.

== Italian version ==
The format has been exported to Italy and first aired in 2021.

Country	Title	TV channel	Seasons	Distribution
Italy	La caserma	Rai 2	2	27 January 2021 – 10 March 2021; 12 November 2023 – 17 December 2023
