= List of places of worship in the Borough of Gosport =

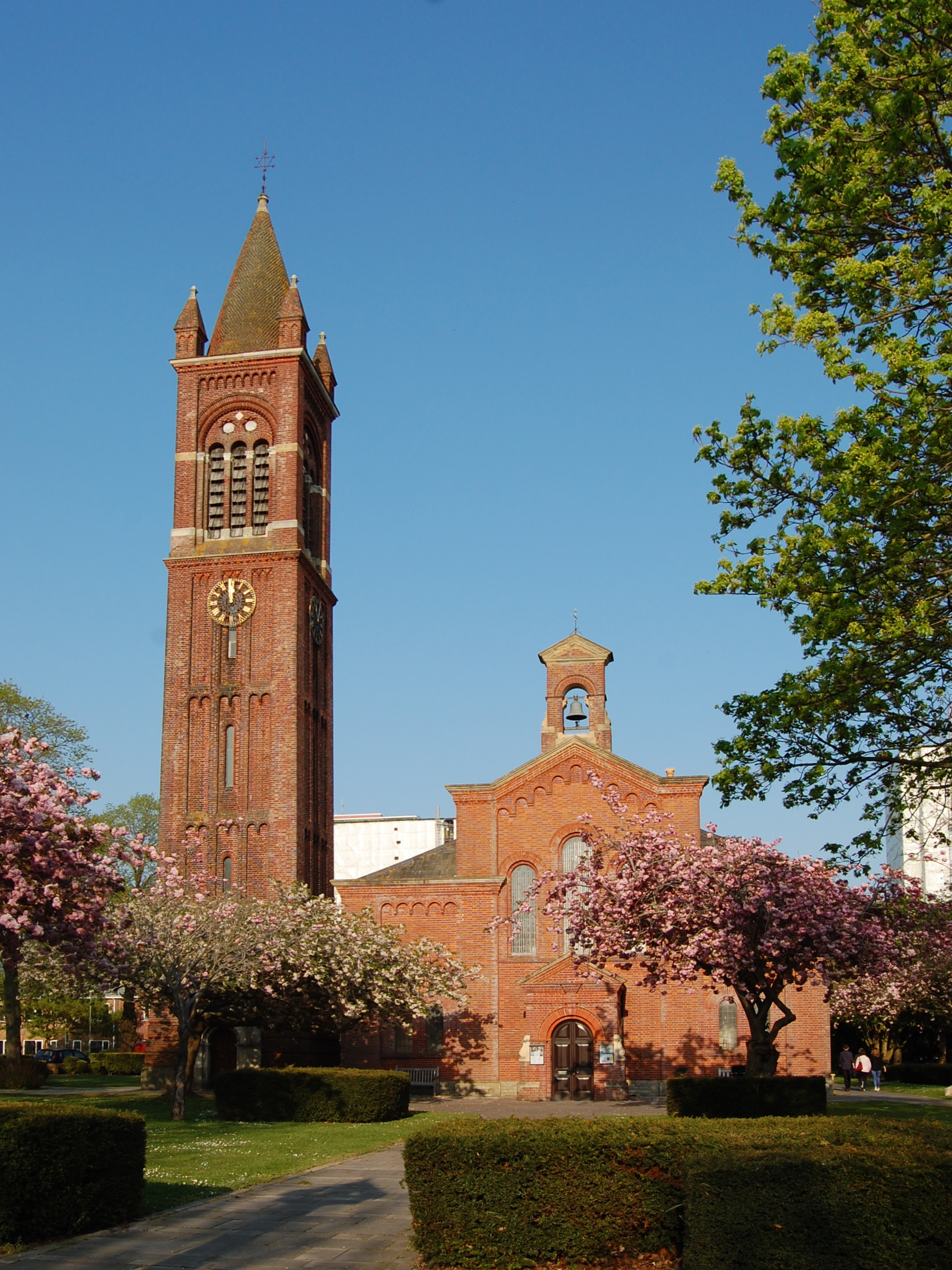
Holy Trinity Church is a landmark in central Gosport. It was built in 1696 and has been altered several times.

There are more than 30 current and former places of worship in the borough of Gosport in Hampshire, England. Various Christian denominations and groups use 27 churches, chapels and halls for worship and other activities, and a further four buildings no longer serve a religious function but survive in alternative uses. Gosport is one of 13 local government districts in the county of Hampshire—a large county in central southern England, with a densely populated coastal fringe facing the English Channel and a more rural hinterland. The borough occupies a peninsula in the south of the county, facing the city of Portsmouth across Portsmouth Harbour, and is largely urban. The town of Gosport expanded in the 19th century to take over previously separate villages such as Brockhurst, Elson, Forton and Alverstoke, which were all outside the extensive defences set up two centuries earlier. Further growth in the 20th century led to the construction of the vast Bridgemary and Rowner housing estates. Old parish churches existed at Alverstoke and Rowner, and survive in much-altered form. These were supplemented by others built mostly in the Victorian era; and a range of churches and chapels for other denominations are also located throughout the borough, mostly dating from the past 150 years. Lee-on-the-Solent, a separate village and seaside resort, is also in the borough and has several places of worship of its own.

The 2011 United Kingdom census reported that the majority of Gosport's residents are Christian, and there are no places of worship in the borough for followers of other faiths. The Church of England—the country's Established Church—is represented by the largest number of church buildings, the oldest of which dates from the 12th century; but a wide variety of other denominations have their own places of worship, some of which can trace their history back to the 18th century when Gosport was becoming established as an important port and centre for Royal Navy. Roman Catholics have worshipped in the town since 1750, predating by several decades the first church in the much larger city of Portsmouth; the first Baptist chapel opened in 1811; several chapels were provided in the 19th century for followers of the Wesleyan branch of Methodism; and a Congregational chapel of 1794 was one of the forerunners of the present Gosport United Reformed Church. Other groups represented in the borough include Evangelical Christians, The Salvation Army and Jehovah's Witnesses.

Historic England has awarded listed status to eight places of worship in Gosport. A building is defined as "listed" when it is placed on a statutory register of buildings of "special architectural or historic interest" in accordance with the Planning (Listed Buildings and Conservation Areas) Act 1990. The Department for Digital, Culture, Media and Sport, a Government department, is responsible for this; Historic England, a non-departmental public body, acts as an agency of the department to administer the process and advise the department on relevant issues. There are three grades of listing status. Grade I, the highest, is defined as being of "exceptional interest"; Grade II* is used for "particularly important buildings of more than special interest"; and Grade II, the lowest, is used for buildings of "special interest". Gosport Borough Council also grants locally listed status to buildings of local architectural or historic interest which are not on the statutory register; two places of worship have this status.

== Overview of the borough and its places of worship ==
The borough is located on the south coast of Hampshire.

The borough of Gosport covers 9.76 square miles (25.3 km^{2}) of land (Note: According to the 2011 United Kingdom census, the area of the borough at the end of 2011 was 2,532.09 hectares, which is approximately 9.76 square miles.) in central southern Hampshire, forming a peninsula facing the city of Portsmouth across Portsmouth Harbour. It has a coastline along The Solent at Spithead and a land border with the Borough of Fareham to the north. The main settlement is Gosport town, which has merged with the ancient villages of Alverstoke and Rowner (each with their own parish church) and other settlements such as Elson, Forton and Brockhurst. Bridgemary, to the northwest near Fareham, is mostly a postwar housing estate, a "vast sprawl" in the north of Rowner parish. In the southwest corner of the borough is the small seaside resort of Lee-on-the-Solent. The land covered by the borough of Gosport was divided between the medieval liberty of Alverstoke, which covered the ancient manor and village of Alverstoke and Gosport town itself, and the hundred of Titchfield. The parishes of Titchfield (which included Lee-on-the-Solent) and Rowner were part of this hundred.

Gosport town was not documented until the 13th century, when "the manor of Alverstoke with Gosport" was transferred from the possession of St Swithun's Priory at Winchester to the Bishop of Winchester. Founded in 1204, according to tradition, it was a small-scale medieval planned settlement similar to Portsmouth and Southampton. There is now little evidence of these origins other than the street patterns around Gosport High Street. The parish church of the whole medieval borough, St Mary's at Alverstoke, does not appear in the Domesday Book but was documented in 1124; structurally, nothing survives of its 12th-century origins. Only in 1696, by which time Gosport's proximity to Portsmouth had increased its importance as an industrial and port town, was an Anglican church (Holy Trinity) provided in the town centre. The rapid growth of the town in the 19th century prompted the construction of more Anglican churches at Forton (1831; rebuilt to a larger size 1892–1906), Elson (1845), the northern part of the town centre around Clarence Road (1845–46), the New Town area around Stoke Road (1865) and Leesland (1890), all of which remain in use except St Matthew's at Clarence Road—demolished in the mid-20th century. The postwar housing estates at Bridgemary and Rowner also required Anglican churches; Rowner already had one, the tiny 12th-century St Mary the Virgin, but it was greatly extended in 1965 (rebuilt 1992 after fire damage), while a new church was built at Bridgemary in the 1950s. At Lee-on-the-Solent, a tin tabernacle served the Anglican population from the 1880s until the present St Faith's Church was completed in 1933.

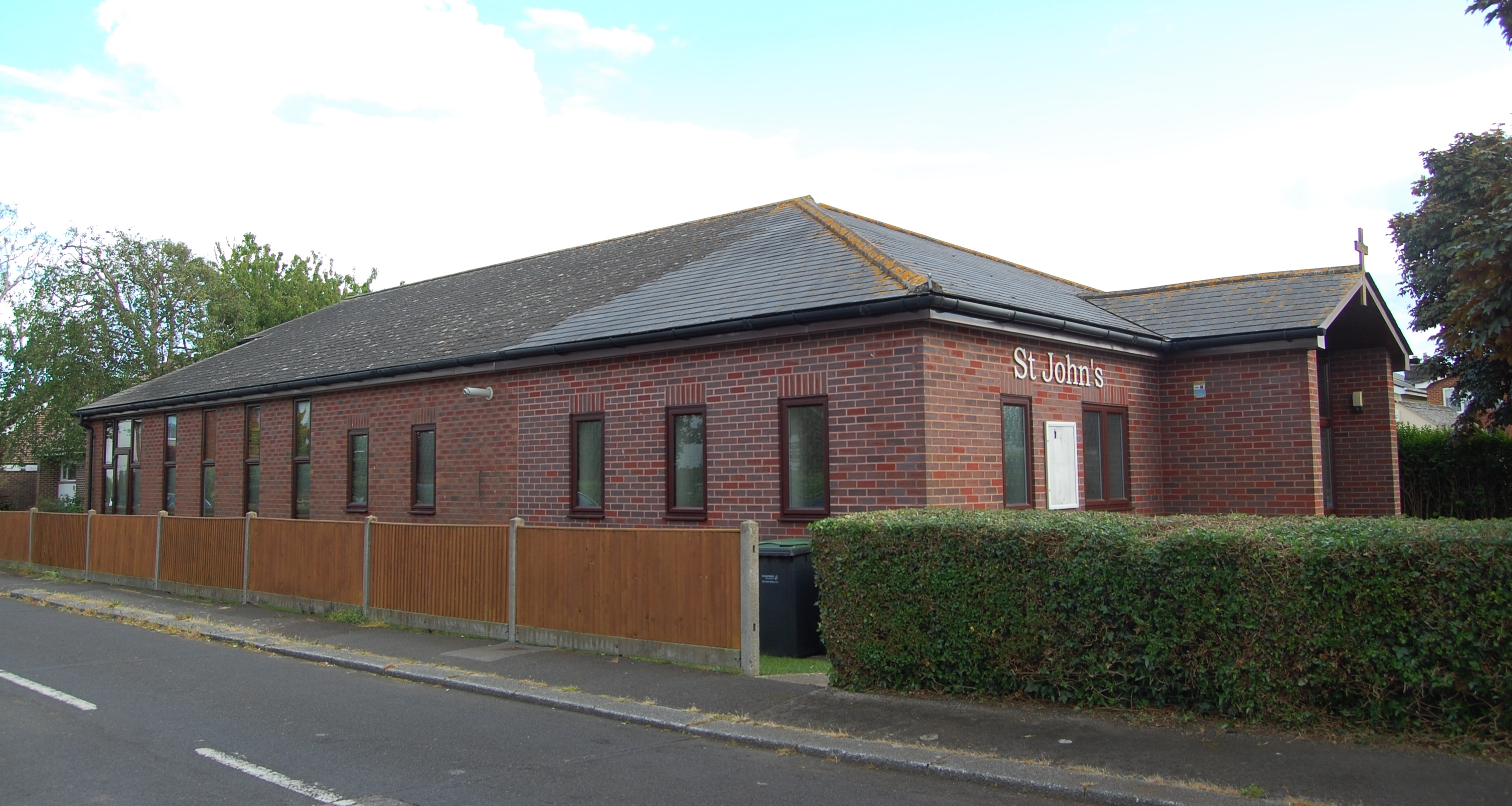
The modern St John the Evangelist's Church serves Catholics in Lee-on-the-Solent.

Gosport's Roman Catholic mission was founded in 1750, before the Papists Act 1778 relieved Catholic worshippers of the penal laws which applied to them. It was founded by and served from Havant, "one of five ancient centres of Catholicism in Hampshire". With no railway or ferry available then, Havant's priest—"an intrepid horseman"— travelled round the top of Portsmouth Harbour, through Cosham, Portchester and Fareham, to reach Gosport. The first chapel also served Portsmouth's Catholics until 1791; in contrast, they crossed Portsmouth Harbour in rowing boats. Later, a wealthy Portsmouth resident put forward money to support a resident priest in Gosport. The present St Mary's Church opened in about 1855 on the High Street. St Columba's Church opened in 1953 to serve Catholics on the Bridgemary estate, and there was also a chapel dedicated to St Joseph in the Leesland area. Lee-on-the-Solent has had a Catholic church since 1918, but the present building dates from 1981.

The Methodist Church of Great Britain documented all the chapels it owned as of 1940 in a statistical return published in 1947. Within the boundaries of the present borough of Gosport at that time, there were chapels at Lee-on-the-Solent, Stoke Road in Gosport town centre, Priory Road in the Hardway area of the town, Lees Lane at Forton and the National Children's Home in Alverstoke. All were originally associated with the Wesleyan branch of Methodism. The first two, opened in 1896 and 1911 respectively, are still in use, and the chapel at Alverstoke was registered until 1984, after which it was converted for secular use. The chapels at Hardway and Forton have been demolished; they were deregistered for worship in 1989 and 1990 respectively. A new Methodist church was built on the Bridgemary estate in 1956.

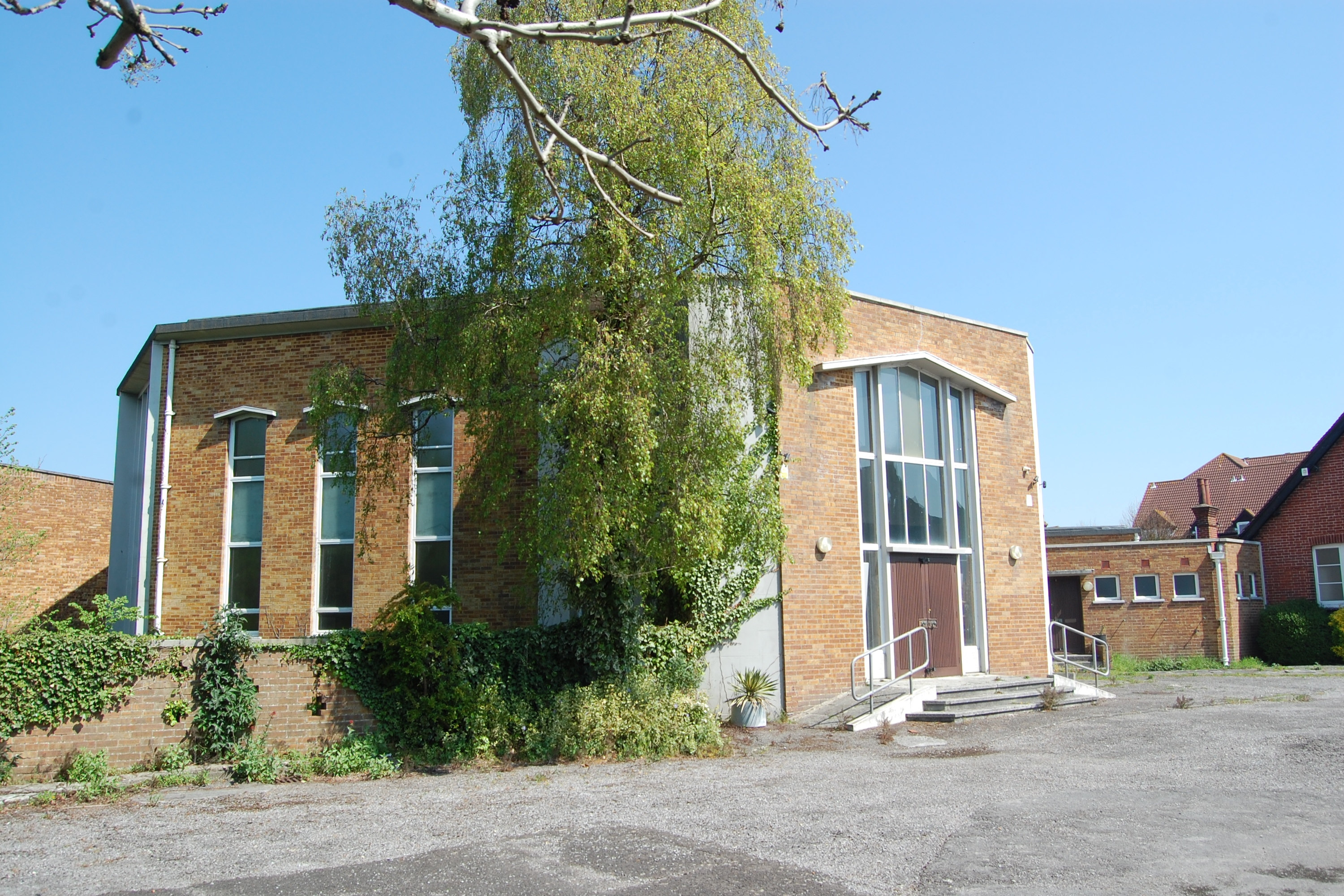
Bury Road United Reformed Church went out of use in 2017.

For a large part of the 20th century, Baptist worshippers in Gosport had a choice of three chapels: at Victoria Road (built in 1852 to replace a nearby chapel of 1811), Hardway (1860) and Stoke Road (1910, replacing a nearby tin tabernacle used since 1883). None of these remain in use. The Hardway church was deregistered in 1991 and is now occupied by a different congregation; Victoria Road closed in 1999 and amalgamated with Stoke Road; and the Stoke Road building itself was sold in 2011 when the congregation moved into an 18th-century building at the Royal Clarence Yard. Another Baptist church had opened in the Brockhurst area by 1937 and is still in use with the name Freedom Church.

The Congregational Church and the Presbyterian Church of England came together in 1972 to form a new denomination, the United Reformed Church. Gosport had one church belonging to each denomination, so from 1972 until 2017 there were two United Reformed churches in the borough. Both were modern buildings—Bury Road Congregational Church was built in 1957 and St Columba's Presbyterian Church opened a year earlier in the Elson area—but the Congregational church could trace its roots back to 1794, when a chapel opened in the town centre. This was destroyed by bombing in World War II. Bury Road United Reformed Church closed in May 2017 and the congregation joined St Columba's Church.

Salvation Army halls registered in South Street in 1927, Park Street in 1934 and Forton Road in 1942 all went out of use in October 1950 in favour of new premises elsewhere on Forton Road, which were in turn replaced by the present place of worship called Crossways Hall in 1965.

== Religious affiliation ==
According to the 2011 United Kingdom census, 82,622 lived in the borough of Gosport. Of these, 58.84% identified themselves as Christian, 0.55% were Muslim, 0.24% were Buddhist, 0.23% were Hindu, 0.05% were Sikh, 0.04% were Jewish, 0.52% followed another religion, 32.82% claimed no religious affiliation and 6.72% did not state their religion. The proportion of people in the borough who followed no religion was higher than the figure in England as a whole (24.74%); adherence to Christianity was similar (in 2011 59.38% of people were Christian); and Islam, Judaism, Hinduism, Sikhism and Buddhism all had a lower following than in the country overall (at census date 5.02% of people were Muslim, 1.52% were Hindu, 0.79% were Sikh, 0.49% were Jewish and 0.45% were Buddhist).

== Administration ==
=== Anglican churches ===
All Anglican churches in the borough are part of the Anglican Diocese of Portsmouth, which is based at Portsmouth Cathedral. The diocese has seven deaneries plus the cathedral's own separate deanery. The Gosport Deanery is responsible for all the borough's parish churches: Holy Trinity and Christ Church in Gosport town centre, St John the Evangelist at Forton, St Thomas the Apostle at Elson, the three churches in Alverstoke parish (St Faith, St Francis and St Mary), St Mary the Virgin at Rowner, St Matthew at Bridgemary and St Faith at Lee-on-the-Solent.

=== Roman Catholic churches ===
The Catholic churches in Bridgemary, Gosport town and Lee-on-the-Solent are part of the Roman Catholic Diocese of Portsmouth, whose seat is the Cathedral of St John the Evangelist in Portsmouth. All are in the Solent Pastoral Area of Deanery 5. The parish of Gosport includes the churches of St Mary in the town centre and St Columba on the Bridgemary estate, and covers the whole of the contiguous urban area. The parish of Stubbington and Lee-on-the-Solent covers those two villages and is served by the Church of the Immaculate Conception in Stubbington (in the Borough of Fareham) and St John the Evangelist's Church in Lee-on-the-Solent.

=== Other denominations ===
The borough's three Methodist churches—at Bridgemary, Gosport and Lee-on-the-Solent—are part of the 23-church East Solent and Downs Methodist Circuit. Gosport Waterfront Baptist Church and the Freedom Church at Brockhurst belong to the Southern Counties Baptist Association. Solent Evangelical Church is a member of the Fellowship of Independent Evangelical Churches (FIEC), a pastoral and administrative network of about 500 churches with an evangelical outlook, Gosport Spiritualist Church belongs to the Spiritualists' National Union and is within the organisation's Southern District, which covers Hampshire, the Isle of Wight, Dorset and Wiltshire.

== Listed status ==
| Grade | Criteria |
|---|---|
| Grade I | Buildings of exceptional interest, sometimes considered to be internationally important. |
| Grade II* | Particularly important buildings of more than special interest. |
| Grade II | Buildings of national importance and special interest. |
| Locally listed (L) | Buildings not on the national list but "considered to be of historic architectural or townscape value located outside Conservation Areas which contribute to the character of the Borough". |

One church in the borough is Grade I-listed, one has Grade II* status and six are listed at Grade II. As of February 2001, there were 148 listed buildings in the borough of Gosport: 2 with Grade I status, 10 listed at Grade II* and 136 with Grade II status.

== Current places of worship ==
Current places of worship
| Name | Image | Location | Denomination/ Affiliation | Grade | Notes | Refs |
|---|---|---|---|---|---|---|
| St Mary's Church (More images) | | Alverstoke; 50.785692°N 1.148004°W | Anglican | II | Henry Woodyer's "big, impressive" Decorated Gothic Revival church—a rebuild of the medieval church on the same site—consists of a chancel of 1865 and a five-bay nave of 1885, all in pale stone with slate roofs. The west tower was rebuilt in 1905; two old bells from its predecessor were rehung inside. | |
| St Matthew's Church (More images) | | Bridgemary; 50.826288°N 1.177601°W | Anglican | – | The Anglican church of the Bridgemary estate is contemporary with the 1950s housing surrounding it and was designed by the firm of Potter & Hare. The original St Matthew's Church (now demolished) was built near Gosport town centre in 1845–46. | |
| Empower Centre (Bridgemary Family Church) (More images) | | Bridgemary; 50.823767°N 1.170159°W | Evangelical | – | This church has had two previous identities, also with an Evangelical leaning: it was registered as Jacob's Well Christian Fellowship between October 1983 and January 1992 and then as Jacob's Well Church. It is now aligned to the Empower movement, which also has worship venues in Portsmouth and Leigh Park. | |
| Bridgemary Methodist Church (More images) | | Bridgemary; 50.829797°N 1.171392°W | Methodist | – | The Methodist church serving the Bridgemary estate opened in 1956 and was registered for worship in March of that year. Its licence for the solemnisation of marriages followed in April 1957. | |
| St Columba's Church (More images) | | Bridgemary; 50.824268°N 1.173798°W | Roman Catholic | – | The church opened in 1953 and was registered for worship two years later; it was intended to be a hall, to be used temporarily until a permanent church was built, but this never happened. The architect was Cyril Sheppard, and the design is similar to his Catholic church at East Cowes (1951). It is a red-brick building with a steep roof and a projecting entrance bay with a shallow porch. Inside there is "a harmonious ensemble" of wooden fixtures. | |
| Freedom Church (More images) | | Brockhurst; 50.808309°N 1.151474°W | Baptist | – | This was originally known as Brockhurst Baptist Church and was registered with that name in February 1937. | |
| St Francis' Church (More images) | | Clayhall; 50.782627°N 1.133906°W | Anglican | L | This tin tabernacle is a chapel of ease in the parish of St Mary's, Alverstoke, and is also used as a church hall. | |
| St Thomas's Church (More images) | | Elson; 50.813686°N 1.148452°W | Anglican | II | In the 1840s Elson and Hardway were "scattered rural communities" distant from any Anglican church. A Government grant helped to fund the construction in 1845 of a church to serve the area, which later became suburbanised. Designed by James Adams in a "dour Early English Gothic Revival" style, it is a long, tall, five-bay, aisleless hall with a steep roof on which a small bell-turret is supported; there is no tower or spire. The walls are of brown stone. Initially a chapel of ease to Alverstoke, it was parished from December 1845. | |
| Gosport United Reformed Church (St Columba's) (More images) | | Elson; 50.813951°N 1.153179°W | United Reformed Church | – | The church was built for members of the Presbyterian Church of England and was registered as St Columba's Presbyterian Church in October 1956. Its marriage licence followed in April 1958. The church joined the United Reformed Church when that denomination formed in 1972. Following the closure of the church at Bury Road in May 2017, the two congregations came together at the newly renamed church at Elson. | |
| St John the Evangelist's Church (More images) | | Forton; 50.799417°N 1.139908°W | Anglican | L | The original church of this dedication was built in 1831, but structural problems and insufficient capacity led to its replacement. The new church, an Early English Gothic Revival structure built of Fareham bricks with Bath stone dressings, was begun in 1892 but not completed until 1906. The roof of the old church collapsed in the meantime, but the building stood derelict until the 1930s. | |
| Solent Evangelical Church (More images) | | Forton; 50.803232°N 1.148888°W | Evangelical | – | This church opened in June 1976, but the Evangelical congregation which occupies it had started meeting five years earlier in a nearby building called Jubilee Hall, which was accordingly registered for their use. | |
| Kingdom Hall (More images) | | Forton; 50.799174°N 1.139530°W | Jehovah's Witnesses | – | Jehovah's Witnesses in the Gosport area have worshipped at this Kingdom hall on Moreland Road since late 1950. | |
| Salvation Army Hall (More images) | | Forton; 50.800643°N 1.140490°W | Salvation Army | – | Crossways Hall at Forton was used in the years after World War II by Gosport's Congregationalists after their chapel was bombed and while their new chapel at Bury Road was being built. This superseded it in 1958, but in 1965 the hall was re-registered for use by the Salvation Army. They had previously occupied a building on Forton Road which was registered for their use in October 1950. | |
| Gosport Spiritualist Church (More images) | | Forton; 50.801103°N 1.142043°W | Spiritualist | – | The Salvation Army had occupied this building at 183 Forton Road between March 1942 and October 1950. It was re-registered by its present Spiritualist congregation in September 1954; its marriage registration followed two years later. | |
| Christ Church (More images) | | Gosport; 50.794161°N 1.132914°W | Anglican | II | The church was built to serve a rapidly growing area of Gosport known at the time as Newtown, and was opened in an unfinished state in 1865. The church institute next to it dates from 1908. A "bulky stone church" designed by Henry Woodyer, it was built in four stages as money became available and was not finished until 1925 (these parts, including the Lady Chapel, were by Charles Nicholson). Most of the "lavish" furnishings were also designed by Nicholson. Listed status was awarded in April 2024. | |
| Holy Trinity Church (More images) | | Gosport; 50.793103°N 1.119900°W | Anglican | II* | The parish church of Gosport has stood on its prominent site by the harbour since 1696, when residents themselves raised some of the money for its construction. It was originally a chapel of ease to St Mary, Alverstoke, but was separately parished in 1860. Its position was enhanced by slum clearance and urban redevelopment in the 1960s which placed it "as the central feature of the new layout" of flats and green space. First extended in 1745, it was rebuilt by Jacob and Thomas Ellis Owen in 1829–30 and again by Arthur Blomfield in 1887–89, giving the church its present Italianate/Lombardic basilica style. The Owens' Classical-style interior, with rows of Ionic columns, survives intact. | |
| Gosport Waterfront Baptist Church (More images) | | Gosport; 50.800218°N 1.124819°W | Baptist | II | The congregation of Stoke Road Baptist Church moved to this building at the Royal Clarence Yard in 2013. It is a former cooperage where until 1970 the barrels to store the Royal Navy's rum rations were made. The brick building dates from 1766 and has a tiled, partly hipped roof. | |
| Waterside Community Church (More images) | | Gosport; 50.794540°N 1.121658°W | Evangelical | – | This is the modern successor to the Bethel Mission "for seamen and the poor", founded close to this site in 1869. The chapel building had a free Day school attached. Major redevelopment of this part of Gosport resulted in the demolition of the old mission and school buildings (and a second mission chapel on Forton Road which had opened c. 1890) and the construction in 1969 of a new Bethel Mission on South Street. In 2000 it became the Waterside Community Church and the building was named the Henry Cook Centre after the man (Note: His name is sometimes spelt Henry Cooke.) who founded the mission and the first Ragged schools and Industrial school in the town. | |
| Gosport Methodist Church (More images) | | Gosport; 50.794502°N 1.131451°W | Methodist | – | Originally known as Stoke Road Wesleyan Chapel and later Stoke Road Methodist Church, the red-brick, 335-capacity church was erected in 1910–11 on the site of a semi-detached house and large adjacent garden. The building was seriously damaged by fire in 1989, after which it was refurbished and extended. | |
| St Mary's Church (More images) | | Gosport; 50.795589°N 1.121723°W | Roman Catholic | II | The full dedication of Gosport's Catholic church is Our Lady and the Sacred Heart. The first Catholic church in Gosport was founded in 1750 and was served from Havant. A new chapel, a "mean wooden structure" which also served Portsmouth's Catholics, opened near the present church in 1776. The new church dates from about 1855 and has a "surprising" interior designed over the course of the next 20 years. The architects Alexander Scoles and R.E. Philips were involved in the design. The "impressive façade" was dates from 1900, and a World War I war memorial was added later. Listed status was awarded in April 2024. | |
| Gosport Family Church (More images) | | Hardway; 50.811641°N 1.136457°W | Non-denominational | – | This chapel on Grove Road was originally built in 1860 as one of several Baptist churches in the town. Its registration as a Baptist chapel was cancelled In November 1991, and it was re-registered in early 1992 for the Church of God of Prophecy, a Pentecostal church within the Holiness movement. It is now used by a non-denominational group. | |
| St Faith's Church (More images) | | Lee-on-the-Solent; 50.804790°N 1.203800°W | Anglican | II | The first Anglican church here—a 150-capacity tin tabernacle—was paid for and erected by Sir John Charles Robinson. Seely & Paget designed a permanent replacement in 1933. The red-brick church holds 400 people and has elements of the Queen Anne Revival style. | |
| Lee-on-the-Solent Methodist Church (More images) | | Lee-on-the-Solent; 50.801121°N 1.200709°W | Methodist | – | Sir William Pyle founded the resort's Wesleyan Methodist church, whose original chapel facing Studland Road was built in 1896. It was a brick building with a capacity of 144 worshippers. The building was later extended to create a frontage on the High Street. | |
| St John the Evangelist's Church (More images) | | Lee-on-the-Solent; 50.794221°N 1.191548°W | Roman Catholic | – | The predecessor of the present church (a modern building registered for worship and marriages in April 1981) was a "unique little church" on the same site on the eastern side of the town, which dated from 1918. St Columba's Church in Bridgemary was in its parish in the 1960s. | |
| Leesland Neighbourhood Church (More images) | | Leesland; 50.798306°N 1.145428°W | Anglican | – | St Faith's Church was built in 1890 as a mission church to serve the densely populated Leesland district. It has always been part of the parish of St Mary's, Alverstoke. In 2017 it was relaunched with a new name and with the intention of providing a community facility open at all times to offer people whatever activities they required. | |
| St Mary's Church (More images) | | Rowner; 50.811308°N 1.172384°W | Anglican | I | This is "a church of two very contrasting parts": a tiny 12th-century chapel with a 13th-century extension, remodelled in 1874 by F.E. Thicke, and a large extension of 1992 by the Sarum Partnership, incorporating a new church and a hall. This replaced an earlier modernistic extension (1965–68) by the firm of Potter & Hare, lost in a fire. The original building now forms the chancel and Lady Chapel. The major expansion of the church was required because of rapid residential growth in the area. | |
| Logos Community Church (More images) | | Rowner; 50.816329°N 1.169590°W | Non-denominational | – | This building was registered in July 1963 as the Copse Lane Gospel Hall for Open Brethren. Since January 1996 it has been used by a non-denominational group. | |

== Former places of worship ==
Former places of worship
| Name | Image | Location | Denomination/ Affiliation | Grade | Notes | Refs |
|---|---|---|---|---|---|---|
| The Little Church (More images) | | Alverstoke; 50.783513°N 1.147617°W | Methodist | – | This was the chapel of the Alverstoke National Children's Home, but it was also registered for public worship as a Methodist church between March 1939 and October 1984. It was built of brick and had a capacity of 150. By 2002 the building was a luxury home, but it has subsequently been converted into a spa and fitness centre. | |
| Stoke Road Baptist Church (More images) | | Gosport; 50.794706°N 1.129970°W | Baptist | – | A Baptist chapel was founded on Stoke Road in 1883. The following year a tin tabernacle was put up, and this was used until a permanent church opened in March 1910 further along the road. The foundation stone was laid the previous year. The congregation of another Baptist church joined in February 1999, but by the early 21st century the Stoke Road building was no longer suitable and the church started meeting at a building in Royal Clarence Yard, where it remains. Stoke Road Baptist Church was sold for conversion into flats. | |
| Bury Road United Reformed Church (More images) | | Gosport; 50.792668°N 1.138956°W | United Reformed Church | – | A Congregational chapel was built in Gosport town centre in 1794 but was destroyed in World War II. Its replacement dates from 1957 and was designed by L.F. Kimber. It is an octagonal, pale brick building with glazed side elevations featuring vitreous panelling. The church closed in May 2017 and merged with St Columba's Church in Elson and its marriage registration, granted in January 1958, was formally cancelled in May 2019. | |
| St Joseph's Church (More images) | | Leesland; 50.799982°N 1.148396°W | Roman Catholic | – | A church existed in this part of the town in 1960, when the dedication was recorded as Church of the Sacred Heart and St Joseph. The present brick building, which closed for worship in the early 21st century, is part of a former Catholic school and was formally opened on 16 July 1971. It was served from St Mary's in Gosport town centre. | |

== Bibliography ==
- Balfour, Alan (1970). Portsmouth. City Buildings Series. London: Studio Vista. ISBN 0-289-79806-X.
- Brown, Ron (1982). The Story of Lee-on-Solent. Horndean: Milestone Publications. ISBN 0-903852-18-7.
- Diocese of Portsmouth (December 1959). Portsmouth Diocesan Yearbook 1960 (12th ed.). Winchester: Donald S. Martell Ltd.
- Dwyer, Gerard (1981). Diocese of Portsmouth – Past and Present. Portsmouth: Portsmouth Diocesan Centenary Committee.
- Edelman, Ian (1993). Gosport: A Pictorial History. Chichester: Phillimore & Co. Ltd. ISBN 0-85033-889-1.
- Facey, Roy A., ed. (1981). International Church Index (Doctrinal). Index Publications. ISBN 0-907578-00-4.
- Kelly, Bernard W. (1907). Historical Notes on English Catholic Missions (PDF). London: Kegan Paul, Trench, Trübner & Co.
- Lloyd, David W. (1974). Buildings of Portsmouth and its Environs: A survey of the dockyard, defences, homes, churches, commercial, civic and public buildings. Portsmouth: City of Portsmouth. ISBN 0-901559-53-9.
- McAuley, Fr James (16 July 2016). The Diocese of Portsmouth Parish Boundaries 2016 (PDF) (Report). Portsmouth: Roman Catholic Diocese of Portsmouth. Archived (PDF) from the original on 16 May 2017.
- Methodist Church of Great Britain (1947). Methodist Church Buildings: Statistical Returns including Seating Accommodation as at July 1st, 1940 (PDF). Manchester: The Department for Chapel Affairs. (Available online in 14 parts; Guide to abbreviations on page 6)
- O'Brien, Charles; Bailey, Bruce; Pevsner, Nikolaus; Lloyd, David W. (2018). Hampshire: South. The Buildings of England. London: Yale University Press. ISBN 978-0-300-22503-7.
- Offord, John (1989). Churches, Chapels and Places of Worship on Portsea Island. Southsea: John Harman. ISBN 0-9514001-0-X.
- Sadden, John (1990). Gosport in Old Photographs. Stroud: Alan Sutton Publishing Ltd. ISBN 0-86299-710-0.
