= Lee-on-the-Solent =

Coastal resort in Hampshire, England

Coordinates: 50°48′11″N 1°12′04″W

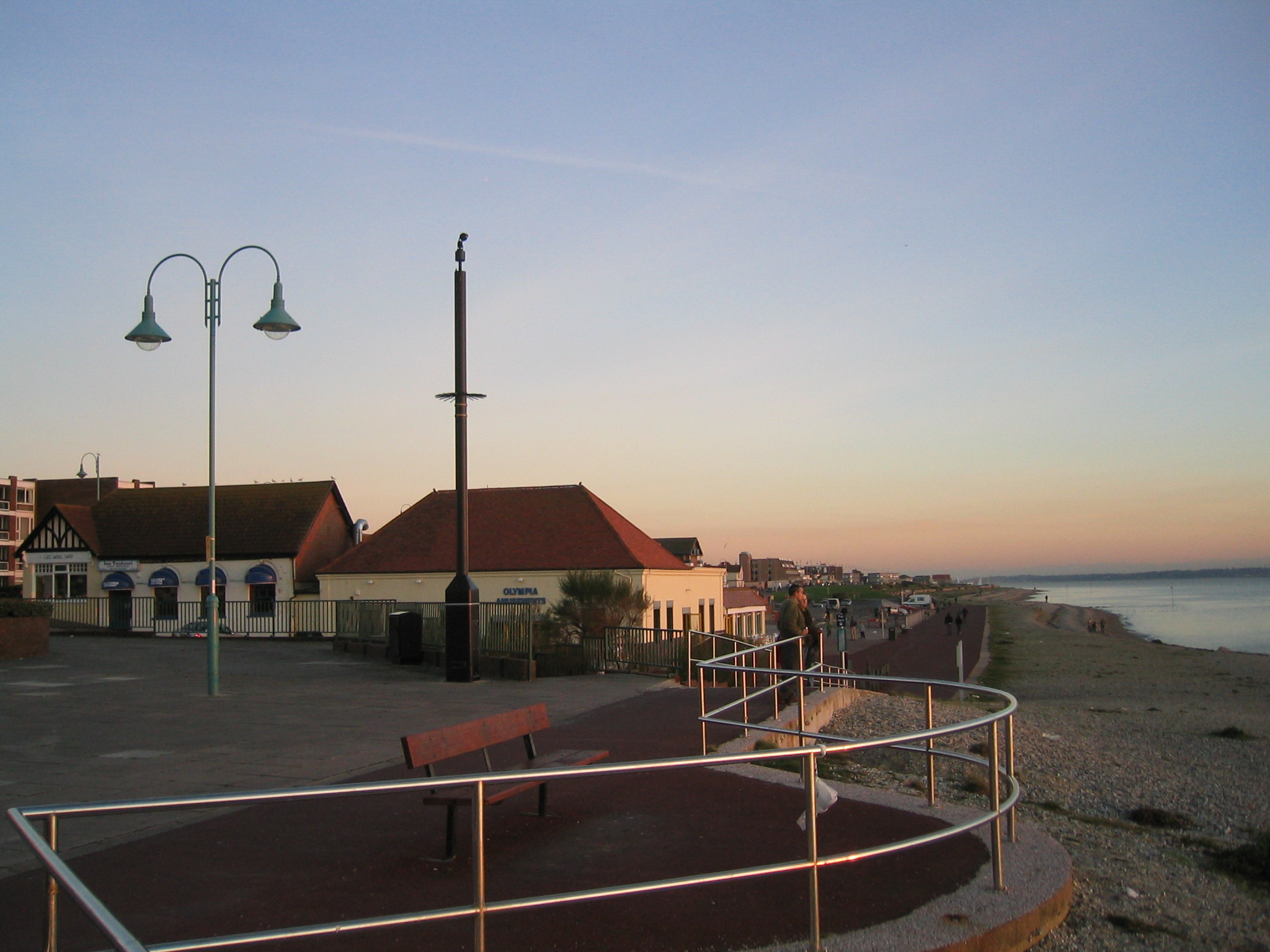
- The seafront and beach at Lee-on-the-Solent

- Location within Hampshire
- Population: 7,224 (2016)
- OS grid reference: SU563005
- District: Gosport
- Shire county: Hampshire
- Region: South East
- Country: England
- Sovereign state: United Kingdom
- Post town: Lee-on-the-Solent
- Postcode district: PO13
- Dialling code: 023
- Police: Hampshire and Isle of Wight
- Fire: Hampshire and Isle of Wight
- Ambulance: South Central
- UK Parliament: Gosport

Lee-on-the-Solent, often referred to as Lee-on-Solent, is a seaside district of the borough of Gosport in Hampshire, England, about five miles (8 km) west of Portsmouth. The area is located on the coast of the Solent. It is primarily a residential area, with an upsurge of mostly local visitors in summer, but was also the former home to the Royal Naval Air Station HMS Daedalus (renamed as HMS Ariel from 1959 to 1965).

== History ==
The district gained its name in the 19th century, during attempts to develop the area into a seaside resort. The area had been referenced long before this, referred to as Lee and numerous variations, including Lebritan. Early impetus for the district's development came from Charles Edmund Newton Robinson, who persuaded his father, John Charles Robinson, art curator and collector, to fund the buying of land. Over the period 1884 to 1894 the district was established with the setting out of Marine Parade, a pier, railway connection along with a number of impressive red brick villas. The railway service was discontinued in the 1930s and the pier, unrepaired after breaching in aid of coastal defence in World War II, was demolished in 1958.

Lee-on-the-Solent has had a long association with aviation. Seaplane trials took place at Lee-on-the-Solent as early as 1915. A base for seaplane training was established in 1917 on the former RNAS Lee-on-Solent, later HMS Daedalus, site.

The new church of St Faith's was built in 1933.

In 1935 the Lee Tower complex was built on the seafront next to the old pier and railway station. It was designed by architects Yates, Cook & Derbyshire, and comprised a white V-shaped Art Deco building with a 120-foot (37 m) tower. The complex housed a cinema, ballroom and restaurant, as well as a viewing platform at the tower's peak. The complex was demolished in 1971 by Gosport Borough Council, with its land now used for the promenade, remembrance gardens and a car park.

On 1 April 1930 Lee on the Solent became a civil parish, it was formed from Crofton and Rowner. On 1 April 1932 the parish was abolished and merged with Alverstoke. In 1931 the parish had a population of 2715.

== Modern times ==
New developments in the 1980s and 1990s increased the population. In c. 2000-2007 1,050 new homes were built at the Cherque farm area of Lee, and further development will take place over the next few years. Elsewhere along Marine Parade, the seafront has lost many of the original villas and hotels to developers.

The Royal Naval Air Station HMS Daedalus closed in 1996 but Daedalus Airfield itself remains active as a civil airfield. Aircraft, helicopters, microlight and motorgliders are operated at what is now the principal HM Coastguard search and rescue helicopter base on the south coast. The airfield is operated by Regional & City Airports Management (RCA) on behalf of the owners, Fareham Borough Council. More information about the airfield is available on the website of Daedalus Aviation & Heritage Group.

A planning application was approved in February 2008 for the construction of a Multi-Purpose Driving Test Centre with Motorcycle Manoeuvring Area (MPTC) from the Driving Standards Agency, inside a part of the Daedalus site.

The Daedalus site has had housing developments built in recent years, with more re-development planned.

In 2003, the community of Lee-on-the-Solent received nationwide attention for probably the first time in its 120-year existence. The government had proposed to house asylum-seekers at the former base which forms a large area of the resort. At once, the Daedalus Action Group was formed under the chairmanship of John Beavis to oppose the scheme with the support of a large number of local residents. After a U-turn in government policy, the Home Office decided in February 2004 to abandon the asylum centre plan and the action group celebrated with a rally on the seafront. Channel 4 produced a fly-on-the-wall Dispatches documentary Keep them out in 2004 dealing with both sides of the argument.

In early May 2006, 20 unexploded Canadian pipe mines were found under HMS Daedalus during site clearance prior to disposal by the Ministry of Defence. 60 feet (20 metres) long, they were left over from 265, packed with a total of 2,400 lb of gelignite, planted in World War II to make the airfield unusable in the event of an enemy invasion. The subsequent removal, thought to be the largest of its kind in peacetime Britain, led to the evacuation of some 900 homes staggered over a five-week period.

The district still has a shopping centre, with a selection of independent shops and restaurants and is a popular destination for jet-skiers and kite surfers.

A bypass was built around the time of the Cherque Farm development to link up the B3385 and the B3333 and forms a bypass to Lee-on-the-Solent.

The train has long since gone from the seafront, clearing the seafront for walking, leisure and parking. The seafront is interrupted by the former railway station buildings, the war memorial and the seafront bus stop/parking area opposite the end of Pier Street. This is where the Lee Tower used to stand.

In August 2011 the government announced that the Daedalus airfield would host an enterprise zone named the Solent Enterprise Zone. The CEMAST (Centre of Excellence in Engineering & Manufacturing Advanced Skills Training) campus on the airfield is now open to students. The centre caters for full and part-time students undertaking apprenticeship programmes for companies such as BAE systems and Virgin Atlantic.

In July 2015 parkrun came to the promenade section of Lee on the Solent. The inaugural run had a total of 430 finishers, with around 25 marshals and support people. In the first year there were just over 3,300 runners and 15,000 completed runs. Last year's inaugural of 430 was topped in April of this year with a running attendance of 485.

On the last day of July 2018, a 'possibly deactivated' bomb was discovered '250 metres south west of the slip way in Lee-on-Solent'. By August 1, the beach was taped off and The Royal Navy had been called in, alongside the Solent Coastguard, to try to defuse the bomb.

== Places of interest ==
The views out to sea from the seafront at Marine Parade are forever changing. From a vantage point on the grassy banks, it is possible to see shipping movements of large container ships and cruisers into Southampton and Portsmouth, sailing boats, ferries and of course the backdrop of the Isle of Wight.

On the seafront on Marine Parade East is the club house of the Lee on the Solent Sailing Club (LOSSC).

At the signal station, where the racing starts and finishes, is a smaller galley that can provide light snacks and soft drinks for the people involved in racing or training at the weekend. It is a RYA accredited Sailing School and is open to visitors and day sailors alike. Boats can be hired.

On Marine Parade West main sea front stands the Commonwealth War Graves Commission's Lee-on-Solent Memorial. This was erected to commemorate the 1,926 men of the Fleet Air Arm who died in various parts of the world in World War II and have no known grave.

Lee-on-the-Solent is the home to the Hovercraft Museum which houses the world's largest collection of rare hovercraft including some of the earliest and largest. It can be found on the main road along the seafront and hosts an open day every summer. From 2024 it is open every Saturday and Sunday from 10 am to 4 pm.

Further towards Gosport is the area known as Browndown. It is a former army firing range and could be considered an interesting walk in summer. There are many old relics to explore, and it is not unknown to find large jellyfish washed up on the shore. Browndown army camp was the setting for the ITV television series Bad Lads Army. Browndown army camp is also used as a summer activity camp for young cadets from all over the country. Beyond Browndown eastwards, is the more affluent district and village of Alverstoke and seafront known as Stokes Bay.

The High Street is unique as it is home to over 70 independent shops and businesses, the oldest of which is The Book Shop established in 1928 and still operates in the same building. Many of the buildings in the High Street pre-date this. The High Street has seen a resurgence in recent years due to a number of popular events in the High Street organised by the Lee Business Association, such as Summer in Lee, Lee Victory Festival and Christmas in Lee light switch on.

A short walk from the High Street in Lee is the Lee-on-the-Solent Tennis Club. It has a small bar, a gym, six squash courts (two glass-backed), six tennis courts and a sports therapist.

Lee's pubs include The Old Ship, The Bun Penny, The Wyvern and The Inn by the Sea. Some pubs have been demolished to make way for housing and retirement developments, including the Belle Vue Hotel and The Swordfish, which was located on the border between Lee-on-the-Solent and Hill Head, Fareham.

In 2020, Hampshire County Council announced plans to close Lee library.

== Climate ==
Lee-on-the-Solent, like many towns and cities along the south coast, has a milder climate than the rest of the UK, though it is slightly cooler than the nearby City of Portsmouth. The record high temperature is 31.7 °C (89 °F) in August 2003 and the record low is −9.2 °C (15 °F) in January 1987

Lee-on-the-Solent has a Met Office weather station situated at the MRSC base.

Climate data for Solent MRSC 1991–2020
Month	Jan	Feb	Mar	Apr	May	Jun	Jul	Aug	Sep	Oct	Nov	Dec	Year
Record high °C (°F)	13.2 (55.8)	15.4 (59.7)	22.0 (71.6)	25.5 (77.9)	28.2 (82.8)	31.1 (88.0)	30.6 (87.1)	31.7 (89.1)	28.1 (82.6)	25.0 (77.0)	18.1 (64.6)	14.1 (57.4)	31.7 (89.1)
Mean daily maximum °C (°F)	8.6 (47.5)	8.7 (47.7)	11.0 (51.8)	13.9 (57.0)	17.1 (62.8)	19.6 (67.3)	21.6 (70.9)	21.6 (70.9)	19.4 (66.9)	15.7 (60.3)	11.9 (53.4)	9.2 (48.6)	14.9 (58.8)
Daily mean °C (°F)	6.2 (43.2)	6.1 (43.0)	7.9 (46.2)	10.3 (50.5)	13.3 (55.9)	16.0 (60.8)	18.1 (64.6)	18.1 (64.6)	15.9 (60.6)	12.8 (55.0)	9.2 (48.6)	6.7 (44.1)	11.7 (53.1)
Mean daily minimum °C (°F)	3.8 (38.8)	3.4 (38.1)	4.8 (40.6)	6.6 (43.9)	9.5 (49.1)	12.4 (54.3)	14.5 (58.1)	14.6 (58.3)	12.4 (54.3)	9.8 (49.6)	6.6 (43.9)	4.3 (39.7)	8.6 (47.5)
Record low °C (°F)	−10.2 (13.6)	−8.6 (16.5)	−3.4 (25.9)	−2.6 (27.3)	1.0 (33.8)	4.1 (39.4)	8.0 (46.4)	6.0 (42.8)	4.0 (39.2)	−1.0 (30.2)	−5.5 (22.1)	−6.0 (21.2)	−10.2 (13.6)
Average precipitation mm (inches)	73.9 (2.91)	52.3 (2.06)	45.4 (1.79)	41.5 (1.63)	41.1 (1.62)	48.3 (1.90)	48.3 (1.90)	55.7 (2.19)	53.3 (2.10)	83.4 (3.28)	90.8 (3.57)	89.6 (3.53)	723.5 (28.48)
Average precipitation days (≥ 1.0 mm)	11.6	9.6	8.3	8.3	7.1	6.9	7.0	7.3	8.7	10.5	11.2	12.2	108.7
Source 1: Met Office (precipitation days 1981–2010)
Source 2: Starlings Roost Weather

== See also ==
- List of places of worship in the Borough of Gosport

== Bibliography ==
1. The Book of Gosport by Lesley Burton and Brian Musselwhite
2. The Story of Lee-on-the-Solent by Ron Brown
3. Exploring the History of Lee-on-the-Solent by Robin A. Money and John W. Green
