= Vic Hutfield =

British engineer and aircraft builder

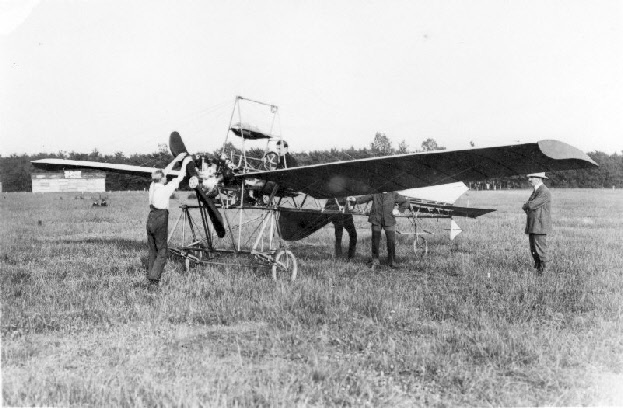

Victor Ernest Hutfield (26 May 1887 – 20 January 1966) was a British engineer and builder of aircraft, including The R.A.S. (Mr. Reader, Mr. Allen and Mr. Sheffield) monoplane in 1909.

Hutfield was born in born Gosport, Hampshire. In 1939, he bought the old military prison (Forton prison), in Lees Lane, Gosport, demolished it and built houses. Hutfield Link road in Gosport is named after him. He operated Hutfield Coach's in Gosport.

He also manufactured the Hutfield JAP Motorcycle.

Hutfield made an audio recording of his attempts to fly in 1958; the original is now stored in the Wessex Film and Sound Archive (WFSA) and uploaded to YouTube.

He died at Queen Alexandra Hospital in Cosham, Portsmouth.
