= South East Hampshire Bus Rapid Transit =

Bus route in Hampshire, England

South East Hampshire BRT

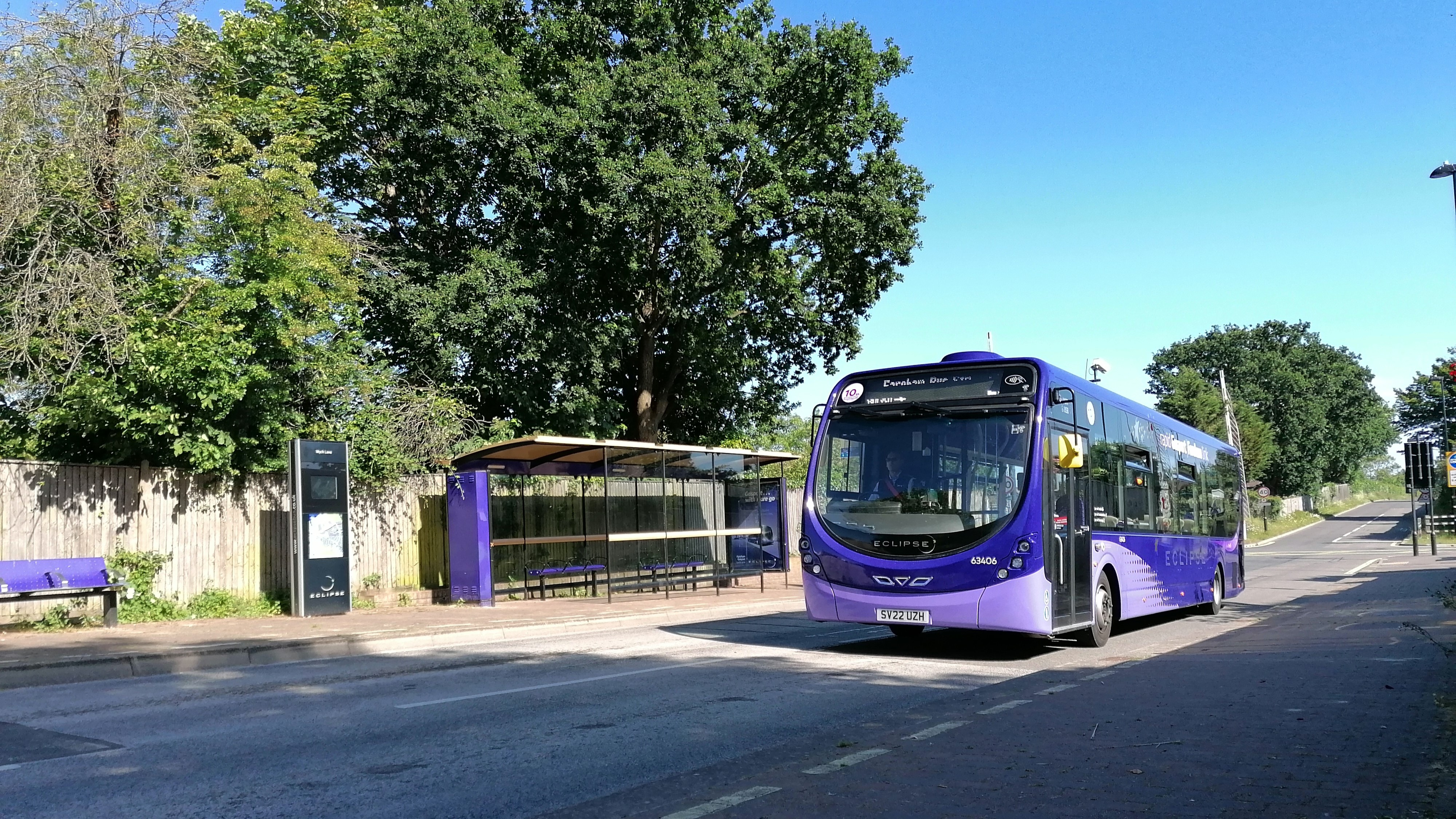
- Wright StreetLite on the BRT route at Bridgemary, Gosport in June 2022

Overview
- Owner: Hampshire County Council
- Area served: Fareham, Bridgemary
- Locale: Gosport, United Kingdom
- Transit type: Guided busway and Bus rapid transit
- Number of lines: 2
- Number of stations: 7
- Website: www.firstgroup.com/portsmouth-fareham-gosport/routes-and-maps/eclipse

Operation
- Began operation: 22 April 2012; 14 years ago
- Operator: First Hampshire & Dorset

Technical
- System length: 2 miles (3.4 km)

The South East Hampshire Bus Rapid Transit (also known as the Eclipse Busway) is a 3.4-kilometre (2.1 mi) unguided busway between Gosport and Fareham in the county of Hampshire, the road itself is called Henry Cort Way and is named after Henry Cort, an ironware producer. The busway scheme is sponsored by Hampshire County Council using the route of the former Fareham to Gosport Line to reduce congestion on the parallel A32 between the towns.

== Overview ==
The busway follows the route of the disused railway from Redlands Lane to Rowner Road. It has 18 stops on the line with three connections in the middle of the line, being Palmerston Drive, Wych Lane and Tichborne Way. It runs under four bridges and passes through three towns. The maximum speed on the road is 40 mph (64 km/h) for all vehicles and has a service pattern between 05:45 and 23:15; outside those times the busway is closed.

== History ==
In 1998 Hampshire County Council and Portsmouth City Council proposed a Light Rail System to link Fareham and Portsmouth via Gosport. Funding of £170m was approved in 2001 but withdrawn in 2004, a decision that was confirmed in 2006. Following this decision, a cheaper, shorter BRT scheme was proposed which led to the creation of the South East Hampshire Bus Rapid Transit.

The route opened on 22 April 2012 with services provided by First Hampshire & Dorset with some of its routes being diverted to use the busway. One of its routes was rebranded to the "Eclipse" bus brand with custom interior specification on its own network of routes that uses the BRT. The "Eclipse" was later given Tap-on Tap-off technology which is compatible with contactless payment card methods.

=== Southern extension ===
In 2017, the Hampshire County Council announced plans to extend the busway further south. £1.4m was secured in partnership with Portsmouth City Council in March 2019 and later the same year, planning permission was granted to start work. The proposed extension would continue on from Tichborne Way and Hutfield Link to Rowner Road (B3334) in Gosport, following the old disused railway. A ramp would be made to link the busway to the Rowner Road bridge. Several public consultations on the extension were held in Gosport in May 2018 and in July 2019 in different venues.

The route extension was completed by December 2021 and the busway was extended southward from 2.8 km to 3.4 km with the new exit point being Rowner Road. This had the effect of reducing journey times by 3 minutes southbound, and 1 minute northbound. Once the extension was complete, the busway operator was expected to create a route to Daedalus, Hampshire and renew its fleet with new high specification, low emission buses. In April 2023, some improvements to pavements were made in the area around the Gosport Leisure Centre to provide better pedestrian access to the southern side of the busway.

=== Future extensions ===
Two further extensions have been proposed for the busway. A northern extension would continue along the disused railway line to Fareham Station, at an estimated cost of £18.8 million in 2012 prices. A second southern extension would continue the busway beyond Rowner Road to St Ann's Hill for around £19 million. The northern extension had support from operators as a medium-to-long term goal. A 2014 report indicated that these further extensions were not then being explored and will not be until after 2026 at the earliest.

== Services ==
Two existing bus routes were replaced by the new Eclipse Bus Rapid Transit network and one was modified to use part of it. All routes are commercially operated by First Hampshire and Dorset.

=== Route E1/E2 ===
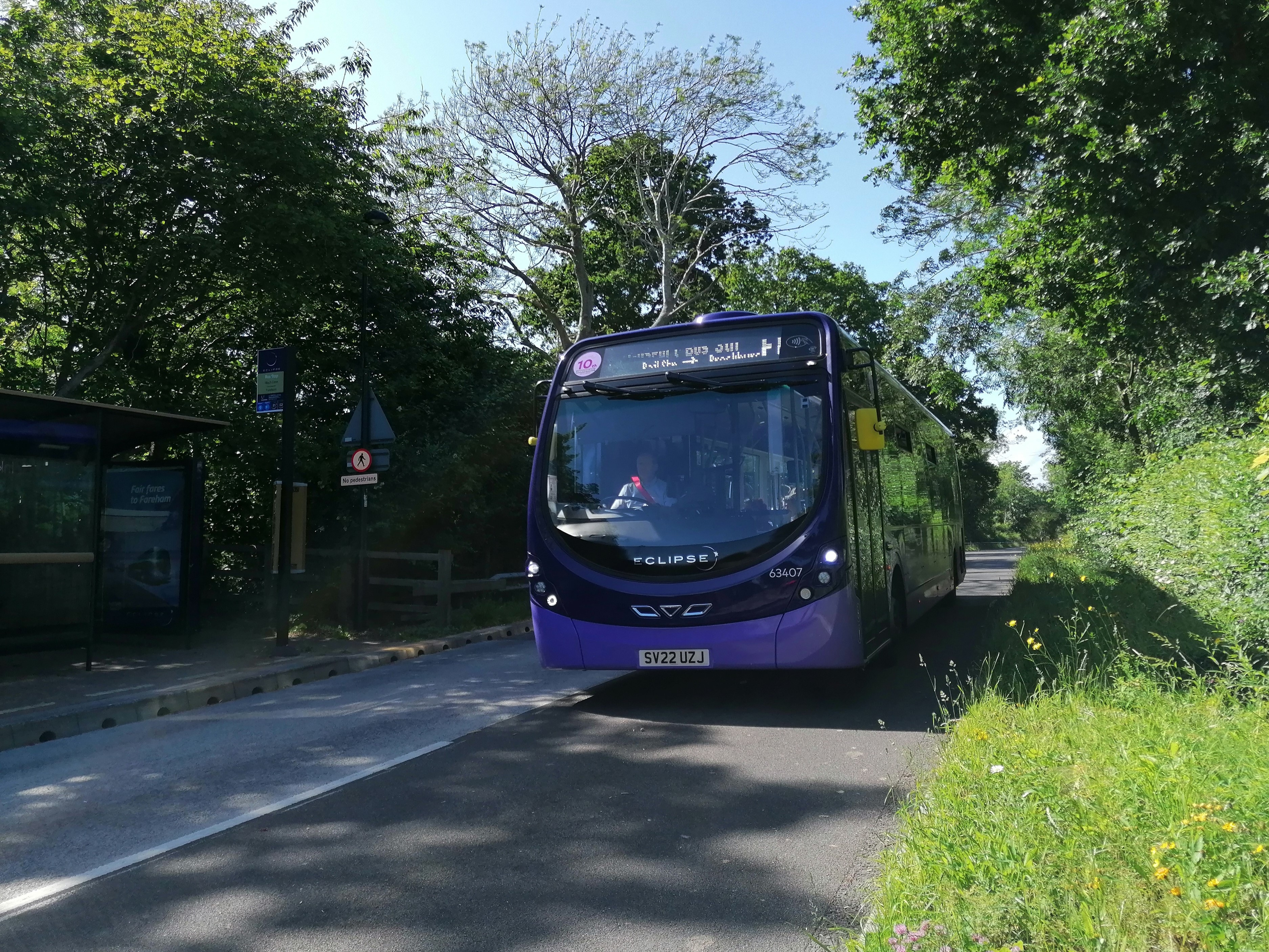
Wright StreetLite on Route E1 at Wych Lane in June 2022

The creation of the Eclipse routes E1 and E2 came as services 86, 82 and at peak times service X88 were diverted to use part of the busway between Wych Lane and Redlands Lane.

- The E1 operates between Fareham Bus Station and Gosport Bus Station via Woodcot and Bridgemary (whilst on the busway), then Elson, Forton and Newtown, and Alverstoke. The services enters the BRT via Redlands Lane and uses the entire unguided track.
- The E2 operates between Fareham Bus Station and Gosport Bus Station via Woodcot and Bridgemary (whilst on the busway), then Elson, Forton, Camdentown, Privett and Alverstoke. The services enters the BRT via Redlands Lane and uses the entire unguided track.

Both of these routes run a 10-minute frequency, with a 5-minute frequency combined at peak times. When the busway is closed during morning and evening times, both routes use the A32 instead before continuing on its normal route off the busway.

=== Route 9/9A ===
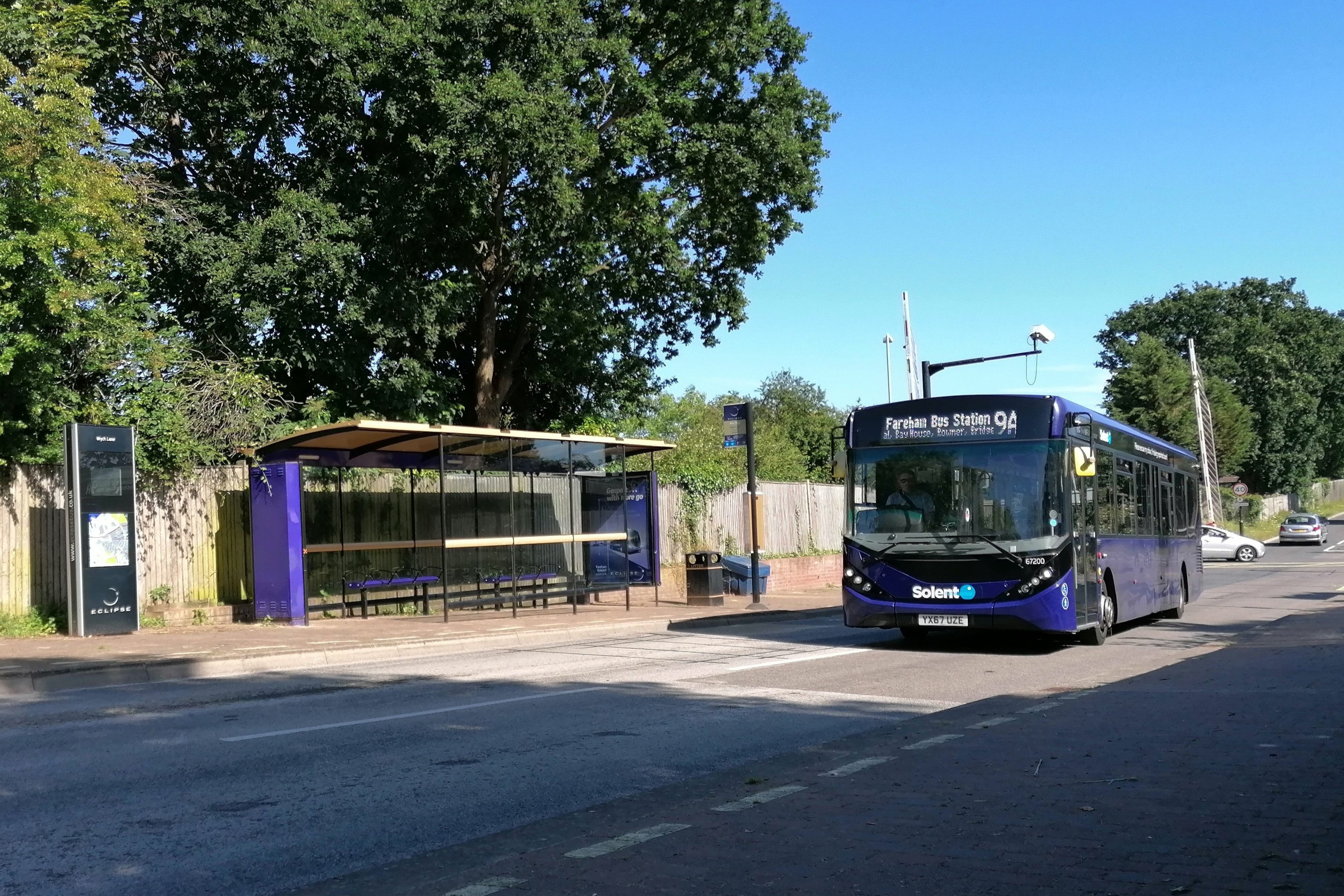
ADL Enviro200 MMC on Route 9A at Wych Lane in June 2022

On 18 November 2012 service 88 was replaced by the new 9/9A, which was modified to use the busway. This route isn't part of the Eclipse network, hence it doesn't use the custom-specification buses used on the E1/E2 routes.

Both services operate between Fareham Bus Station and Gosport Bus Station, via Woodcot, Bridgemary, Rowner, Privett and Alverstoke. They enter the busway at Redlands Lane and leave it at Wych Lane in Woodcot. The routes split to serve different areas in Rowner and rejoin at Howe Road.

Both of these services run at a 40-minute frequency, or a 20-minute frequency combined between peak times. When the busway is closed during morning and evening times, both routes use the A32 instead before continuing on their normal route off the busway.

== Access ==
In addition to buses, the route is also open to cyclists and emergency service vehicles.

The route is not open to pedestrians. There are no pavements to facilitate this and the road is not lit, but pedestrians occasionally use it as a shortcut regardless. A woman was struck and killed in 2016.

== Gallery ==
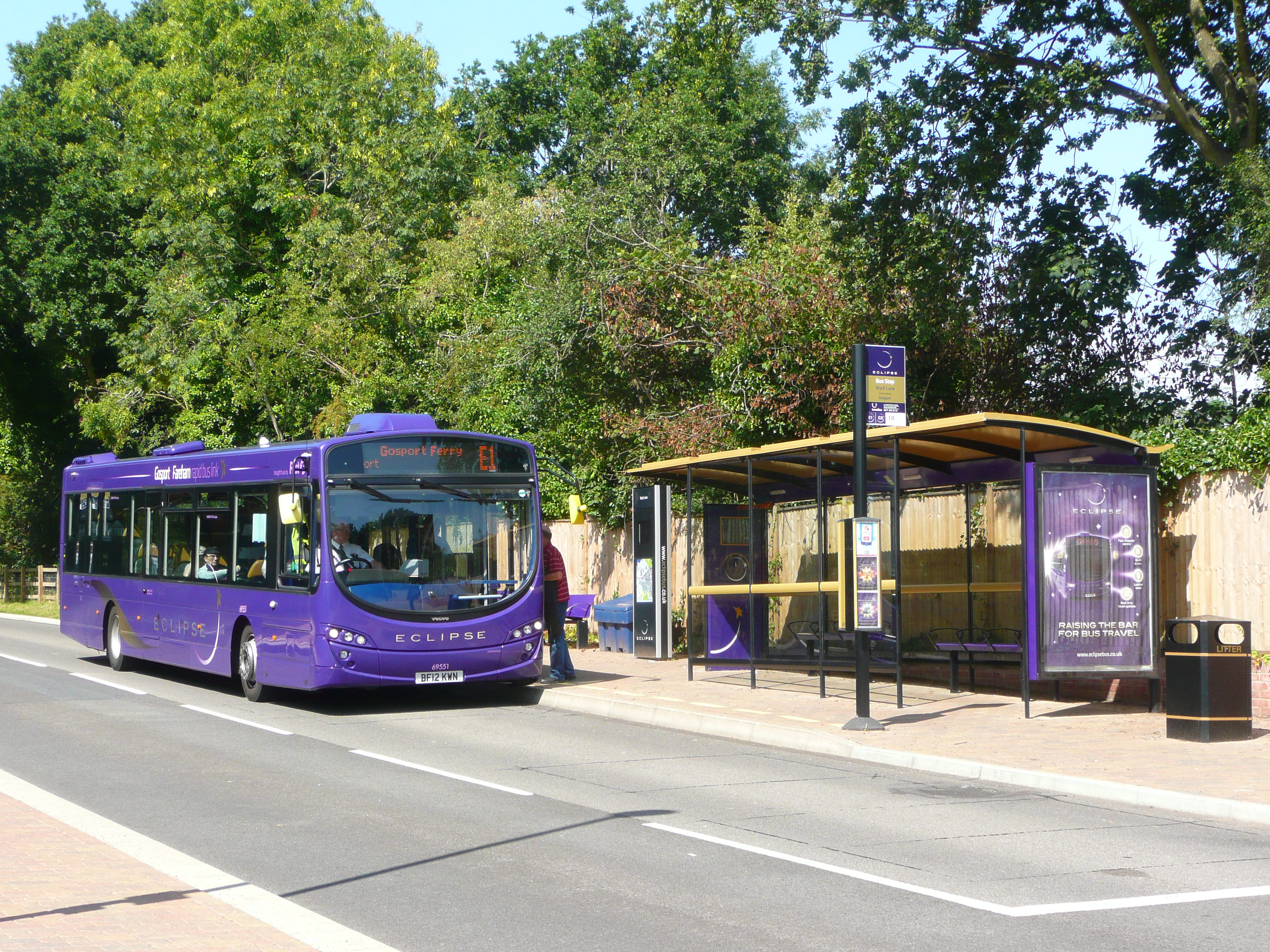
First iteration of the Eclipse BRT livery, seen in August 2013

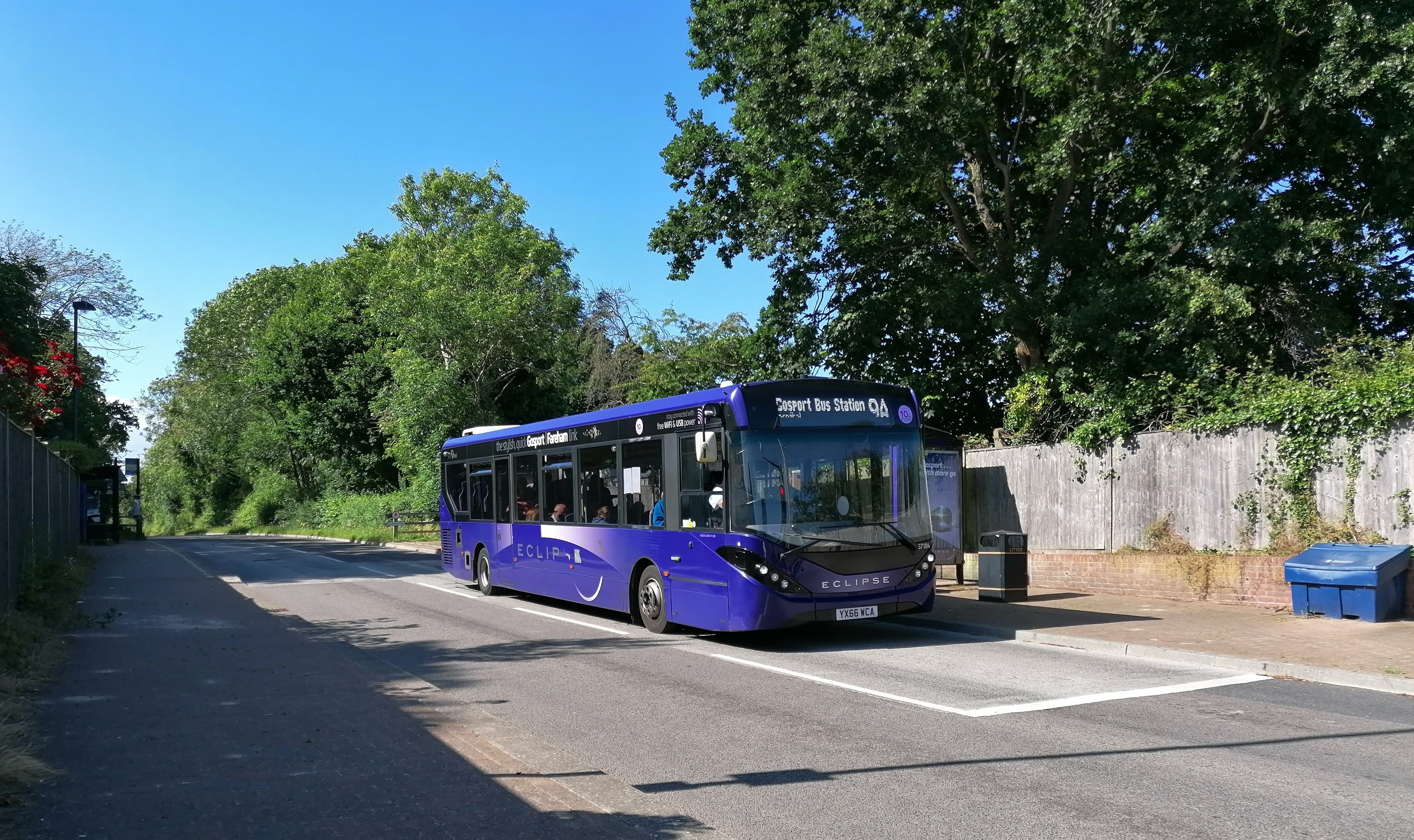
Second iteration of the Eclipse BRT livery, seen in June 2022

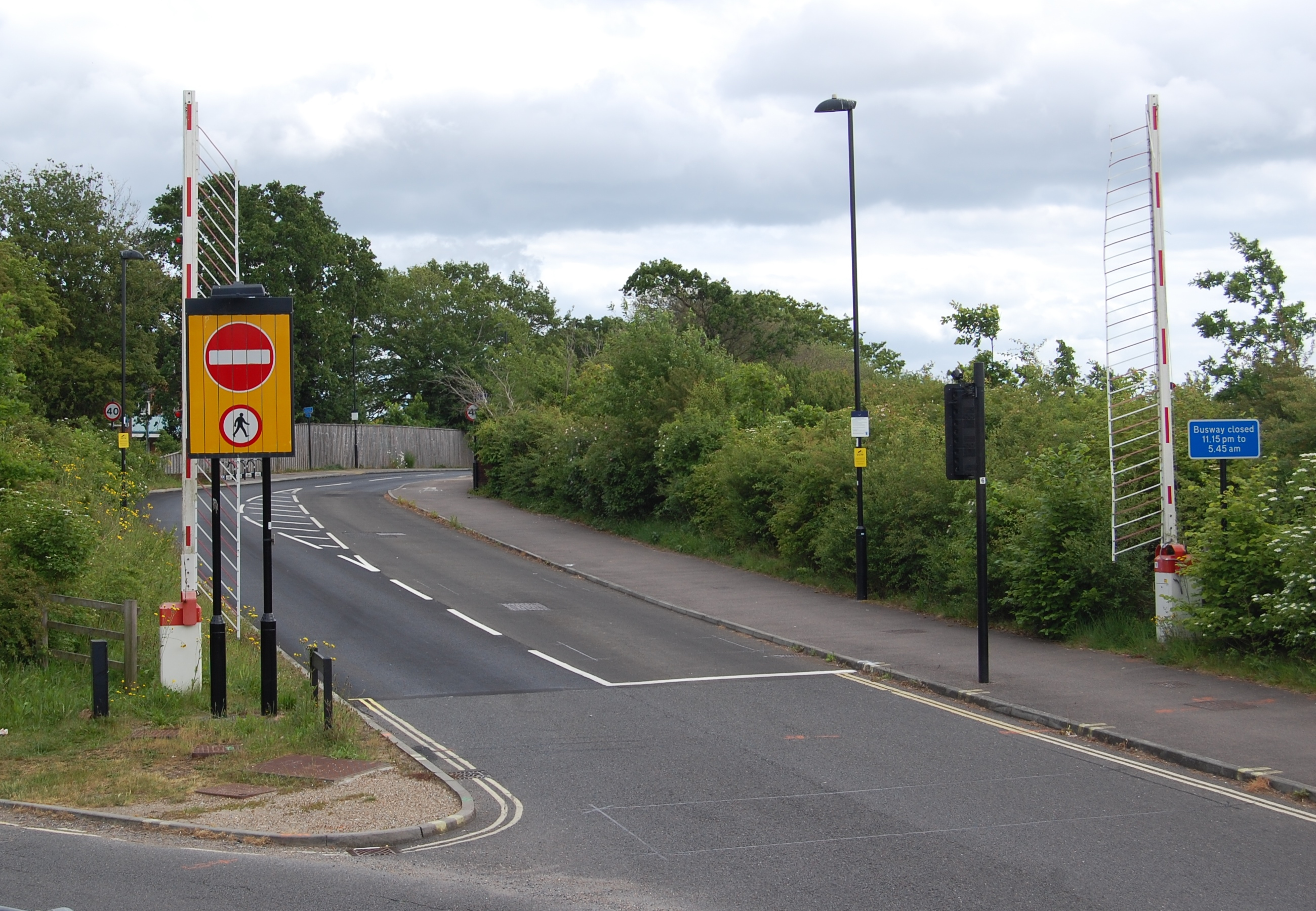
Northern entrance to the busway at Fareham, showing automatic barriers
