= Transport in South Hampshire =

Transport network serving South Hampshire

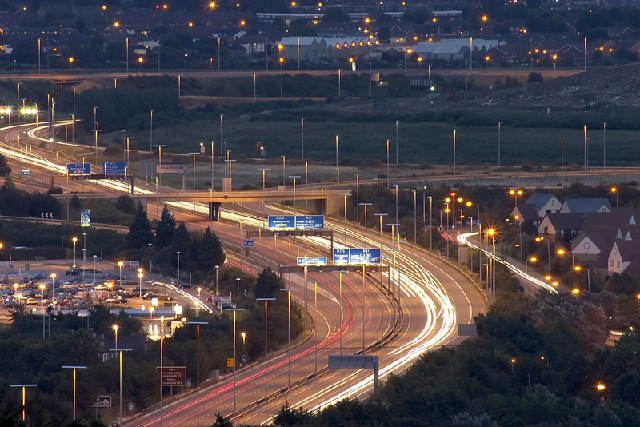
- View of the M27 from Portsdown Hill

Overview
- Area served: South Hampshire conurbation
- Transit type: Buses; Trains; Ferries; Motorways

Location of the boroughs of South Hampshire

South Hampshire is the term used to refer to the conurbation formed by the city of Portsmouth, city of Southampton and the non-metropolitan boroughs between them. As a result of the area's high population density, it has a developed public transport network. However, due to the area being controlled by different Authorities, most notably Southampton City Council, Portsmouth City Council and Hampshire County Council, there is little coordination of the system.

== Local coordination ==
The area has My Journey, a travel awareness campaign, funded by local councils as well as the Department of Transport, to help better coordinate and advertise local public transport. My Journey also runs Solent Go, which is a travel card, allowing one ticket to be used throughout the area.

The area also has a journey planner app, Breeze, which allows for journey planning throughout the region. However, the app does not provide its own tickets, with ticketing being left to transport operators.

== Cycling and E-Scooters ==
Within the city boundaries of both Southampton and Portsmouth, as well as the Isle of Wight, Voi provides a Scooter-sharing system, which also includes E-Bikes. They are accessed by a mobile app. E-Scooters are only for hire for those with a Provisional or Full driving license.

=== Cycle Networks ===
The area hosts multiple National Cycle Network routes. Most prominently, running through the area is National Cycle Route 2, from St Austell to Dover.

The Southampton City Council has a Ten Year Plan to complete a cycle network throughout the City of Southampton. The plan started in 2017, with it consisting of 9 cycle routes, two of which circle the city while the rest act as arterial routes.

== Buses ==
The area has two distinct bus networks, with each one serving one of the two main cities.

In the North, Bluestar has a large network serving Southampton and the surrounding areas of Eastleigh, Totton, Hedge End and Winchester. Bluestar also runs Unilink, which runs routes for the University of Southampton. Buses in this area for the most part either start/pass through Southampton City Centre (either Vincents Walk or Westquay/Albion Place) or Eastleigh Bus Station.

In the South, First Hampshire and Dorset run the First Solent brand. This runs mainly between Gosport bus station, Fareham Bus station and Portsmouth 'The Hard' Bus Station. First also run a route from Southampton to Portsmouth, via Fareham. They also run buses, branded 'Eclipse', that run along Henry Cort Busway. They further operate 'The Star', a service that runs along the route of the old Portsdown and Horndean Light Railway.

Throughout the area Stagecoach South and Xelabus both run limited services, though Stagecoach run many of the services in Havant.

=== Park and ride ===
The area has one official park and ride at Tipner, the Portsmouth P&R, just off the Junction 1 of the M275. Two bus services are run from here – the PR1 to Portsmouth 'The Hard' Bus Station and PR3 to Southsea Front.

=== NHS park and ride ===
Bluestar run the NHS P&R service, which links Adanac Park and University Hospital Southampton. First Solent run the 'QA1', a bus service which links a car park on Portsdown Hill to the Queen Alexandra Hospital.

== Ferries ==
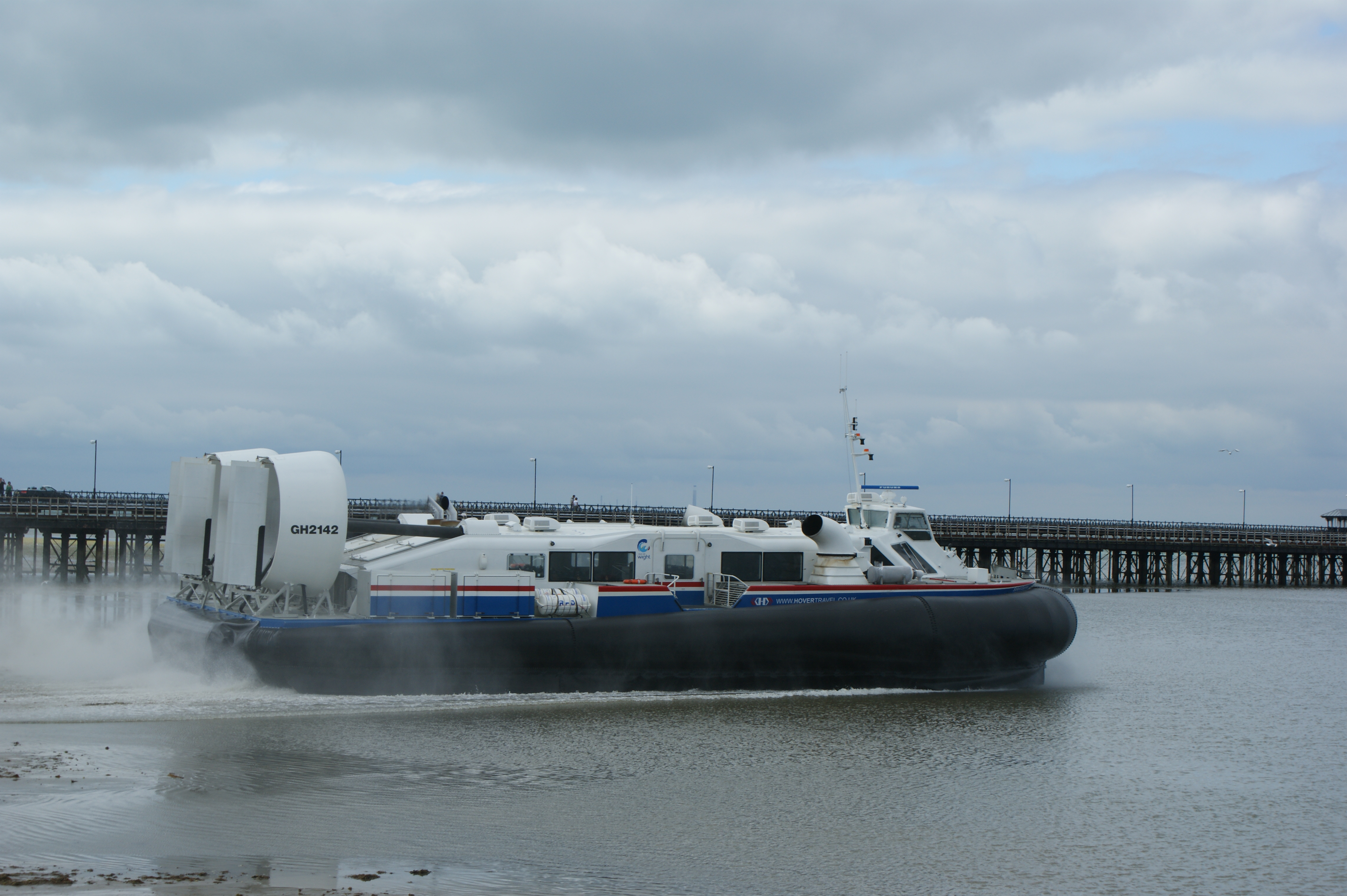
Hovercraft leaving Ryde

The area has ferries to the Isle of Wight. From Town Quay Southampton, Red Funnel operate passenger services to Hythe and Cowes. They also operate a Vehicle ferry to West Cowes.

Across the River Hamble, the Hamble-Warsash Ferry operates using small pink boats.

Between Gosport and Portsmouth, the Gosport Ferry crosses the Portsmouth Harbour. Also from Portsmouth Harbour, Wightlink run passenger ferries to Ryde Pier. Wightlink also runs vehicle ferries from Portsmouth International Port to Fishbourne. From Portsmouth Port, Brittany Ferries and Condor Ferries operate services to the Channel Islands, as well as mainland Europe.

Between Southsea and Ryde, Hovertravel operate a passenger hovercraft service.

The Hayling Ferry runs between Portsea Island and Hayling Island, crossing the mouth of the Langstone Harbour.

== Trains ==
The area's rail network is maintained wholly by Network Rail. Rail services are provided by CrossCountry, Great Western Railway, Southern and South Western Railway.

Most of the area falls under the South Western Franchise, with them operating most of the roughly 30 stations in the area.

There are five trains an hour to London Waterloo, taking the South West Main Line or the Portsmouth Direct Line. Between Southampton and Portsmouth, two trains run per hour, with one being a stopping service. Along Southampton-Fareham line the four trains per hour run.

The busiest station in the area is Southampton Central, with 5.5 million passengers in 2022/23. Next is Havant with 1.8 million passengers, Portsmouth Harbour with 1.7 million passengers in 2022/23, and Portsmouth and Southsea, with 1.7 million passengers.

== Motorways ==
The area hosts 5 motorways. The M27 acts as a backbone to the area, running from Cadnam in the North, through the area, to Havant in the South. The M271 links the M27 to Southampton Docks. The M275 links the M27 to Portsea Island. The M3 links Northern Southampton to London, via Winchester. The A3(M) links the M27 to London, via Guildford. All but the M275 are maintained by National Highways, with the M275 being maintained by the Portsmouth City Council.

== Issues ==
In 2014, Fareham was named the most car-dependent town in the UK by the Office for National Statistics with 538.7 cars registered to addresses in the town for every 1,000 residents.

In 2016, it was published that the area has an average car journey speed that is 32% lower than the national average.

Again in 2016, many issues were reported about the Rail Network in the area. These include:

- Long journey times between Portsmouth and Southampton.
- Congestion on some lines.
- Lack of Rail connection to Southampton Cruise terminals, the Waterside (Fawley and Hythe) and Gosport - the largest town in the UK with no rail station.
- Slow and congested lines into Waterloo.
- No freight or passenger rail connection to Portsmouth Port.
- Significant delays along the Eastleigh-Fareham Line due to it being single track for most of its length.

== Proposed developments ==
In the late 1960s, as part of Colin Buchanan's plan for development in the area, a network of motorways were proposed. These include the M270, M272, M273 and M274. All would run from the M27 into the new city, much like the current M271 and M275. The development plan was pulled by Harold Wilson's Labour government and after 1974, the recently restructured local government did not support the scheme. As a result of the changes, Junction 6 of the M27 is missing.

In 1972, as part of the re-organisation of local government under the Local Government Act 1972, the whole area had the Hampshire County Council as the Upper Authority, with Portsmouth and Southampton being designated as local boroughs. In 1997 however, the recommendation of Sir David Cooksey through the Cooksey Commission was implemented, which made Southampton and Portsmouth Unitary Authorities, a situation that remains to this day, where the local authorities are divided through the area.

In 1998, Hampshire County Council with Portsmouth City Council proposed a new Light Railway between Fareham and Portsmouth, via Gosport. However, in 2006, the scheme was scrapped, with the council instead building the Henry Cort Busway between Fareham and Gosport.

In 2014, Pro-Link proposed a tunnel connecting the Isle of Wight to the UK mainland. The project is one in a long line of proposed fixed links. However, the issue is seen to be controversial on the Island, with the scheme also having significant cost. As a result, no progress has been made.

Also in 2014, Southampton and Portsmouth City councils, along with seven coastal boroughs, claimed support of a new combined authority, much like the one established in Bournemouth, Christchurch and Poole. This would have brought all transport under one authority. However, this plan was dropped due to an objection from Hampshire County Council.

In July 2018, Three Rivers Community Rail Partnership submitted a plan to re-open the Fawley Branch Line, connecting Hythe and Fawley to Southampton. In 2020, a test train was run down the line by South Western Railway, with Network Rail then backing the scheme. Points, signals and crossings would need to be upgraded, as well as rebuilding the demolished stations. In July 2024, it was confirmed that funding for the scheme had been cut, along with the ending of the 'Restoring your Railways Fund', which then chancellor Rachel Reeves called 'unfunded'.

In March 2020, the M3 Junctions 9-14 Smart Motorway Upgrade gained funding, with a completion of 2024. However, the scheme was cancelled in April 2023, due to cost pressures and lack of public support.

In September 2021, Three Rivers Community Rail Partnership proposed the 'Solent Metro Line', which would run in a loop from Southampton to Eastleigh, where it would reverse to Fareham, where it would reverse again back to Southampton. They also proposed a new station called Welbourne, to serve the Welbourne Garden City development, as well as a Swanwick Parkway Station. Southampton City Council called the plans a 'golden opportunity'. The plan however, had no financial backing.
