= Edward Scrope Shrapnel =

English-Canadian painter

- Born: Edward Scrope Shrapnel; 12 January 1845; Alverstoke, Hampshire, England
- Died: 25 September 1920 (aged 75); Victoria, British Columbia, Canada
- Known for: Painter

Edward Scrope Shrapnel (1845–1920) was an English-born Canadian artist. After an earlier period spent in Quebec, his family settled in Orillia, Ontario. Having learned the basic art of drawing in the military, Shrapnel became adept in watercolour, his preferred medium. In the 1870s, he began contributing works to the Ontario Society of Artists. He was elected as an associate member of the Royal Canadian Academy in 1880. After a five-year stint as a drawing teacher for a women's college, he moved west to Victoria, British Columbia. Shrapnel was president of Victoria's first art association. His painting subject matter included landscape, still lifes, and genre, often incorporating scenes from Ontario and British Columbia.

== Biography ==
Shrapnel was born on 12 January 1845, in Alverstoke, Hampshire. His grandfather was Henry Shrapnel, inventor of the shrapnel shell. His father was Henry Needham Scrope Shrapnel, a military officer with the rank of captain who was variously posted to India, Ireland, and Bermuda. In 1855, Edward's father was assigned to Quebec, his family accompanying him. Here young Edward first cultivated his love of the outdoors. Carrying on the family tradition, Edward served with the Victoria Rifles of Quebec for seven months in 1865–1866, helping to repel Irish Fenian raids. As a consequence of his officer training, Shrapnel learned how to draw accurately. After the border tensions eased, the Shrapnel family returned to Salisbury. In 1868, Edward married Edith Mary Neale, and they eventually had six daughters and one son. The family soon moved back to Canada, this time settling near Orillia, Ontario. Henry Shrapnel was a talented amateur artist, and Edward became proficient in the use of watercolour, which became his favourite medium. In Ontario, Edward participated each fall in duck and deer hunting, and on occasion engaged in wild pigeon shoots. His funeral notice described him as an "ardent sportsman".

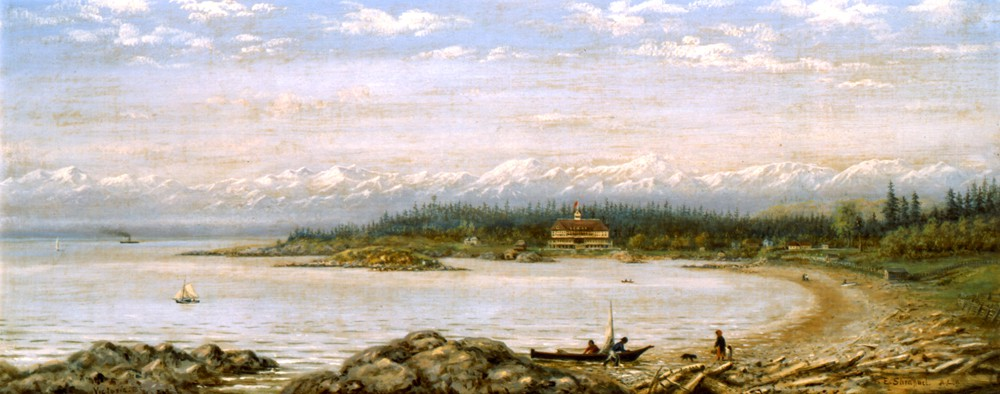
View of Hotel Mount Baker, Oak Bay, c. 1894

In 1872, Shrapnel was elected a member of the Ontario Society of Artists, and he contributed works to that organization until 1892. He became an associate member of the Royal Canadian Academy of Arts when it was formed in 1880. For five years during the 1880s he held the position of drawing master at the Ontario Ladies' College in Whitby. In 1889, one of his paintings of dead game won first prize at the Toronto Industrial Exhibition. Influenced by other artists who had travelled west on the newly opened Canadian Pacific Railway, Shrapnel moved to Victoria, British Columbia, where he spent the rest of his life. Shrapnel served as president of Victoria's first art association. He was a member of the British Campaigners' Association as a result of his Canadian military service, having reached the rank of colonel. In 1890, he contributed 18 paintings to the Vancouver Art Association's first annual exhibition. Shrapnel was the illustrator of Upper Canada Sketches (1898), where his twenty scenes were lithographed in brilliant colour. At the time of his death, several of his works were displayed in the British Columbia Parliament Buildings. He was interred at Ross Bay Cemetery in Victoria.

Shrapnel's subject matter encompassed landscape, genre, and still life. His early works often depict the Muskoka region of Ontario, and later of British Columbia. Animals and indigenous peoples figure prominently, and he painted still lifes of fish. Some of his winter landscapes in oil are reminiscent of Cornelius Krieghoff. He eschewed the dramatic and picturesque, managing to avoid the rigid strictures of composition and style as conventionally practiced. Today, Shrapnel is best known for his watercolours of scenes across Canada.

== Exhibitions ==
- Ontario Society of Artists, 1875–1892
- Art Association of Montreal, 1881, 1888
- Toronto Industrial Exhibition, 1881–1892
- Royal Canadian Academy of Arts, 1881, 1884–1889
- Vancouver Art Association, 1890
- Malaspina College, 1988

== Collections ==
- Royal Ontario Museum
- Orillia Museum of Art & History
- Oshawa Museum
- Musée national des beaux-arts du Québec (MNBAQ)
- Art Gallery of Greater Victoria
- Museum of Vancouver
- British Columbia Provincial Archives
- Vancouver Art Gallery

== Gallery ==
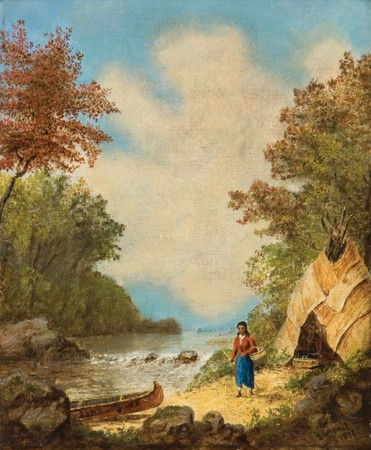
Indigenous woman leaving her wigwam, 1878

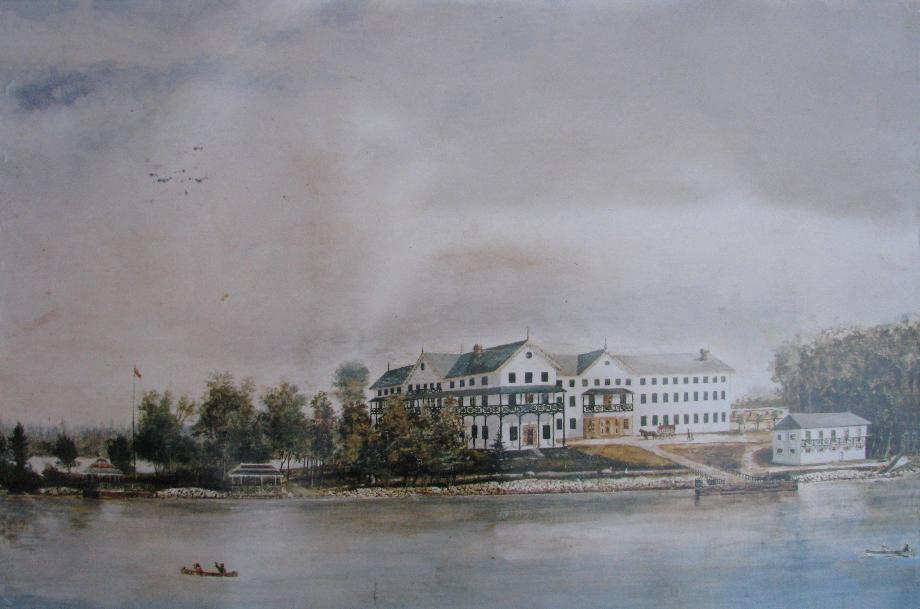
The Couchiching Hotel at Orillia

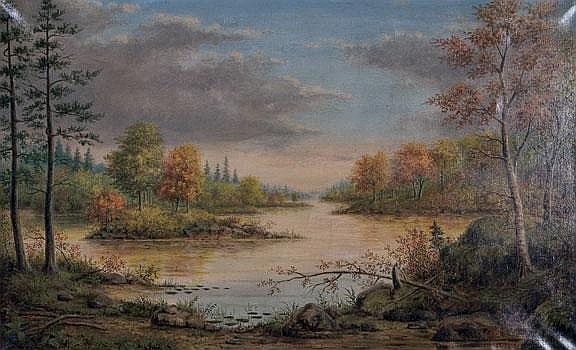
Northern Lake with Trees and Islands, 1904

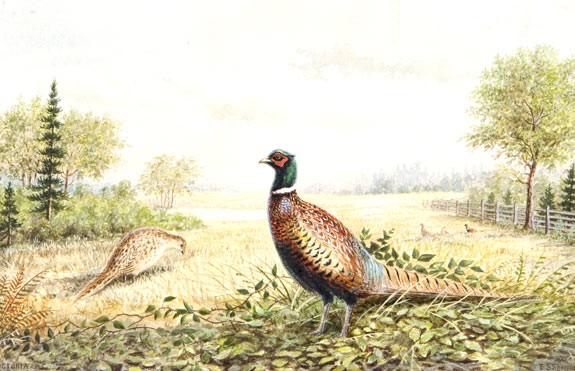
Pheasants at Victoria, B.C.
