= Little Woodham =

Living museum in Hampshire, England

Coordinates: 50.8004°N 1.1746°W

Little Woodham, also known as "The Living History Village of Little Woodham" or "The Seventeenth Century Village", is a living museum dedicated to recreating life in a rural village in the mid-17th century. It is situated in ancient woodland in Rowner, on the Gosport peninsula, Hampshire.

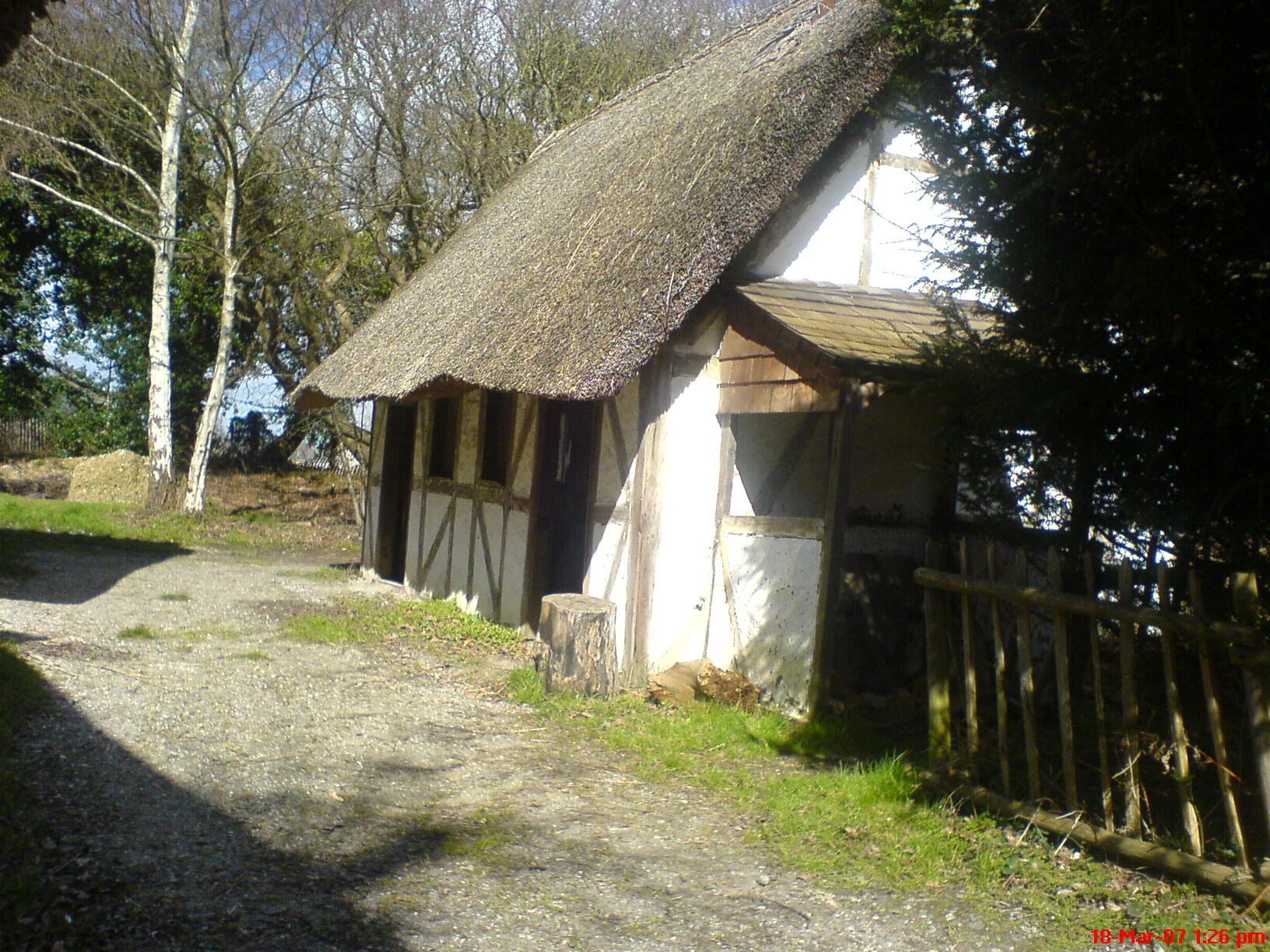
The Spinners Cottage in Little Woodham.

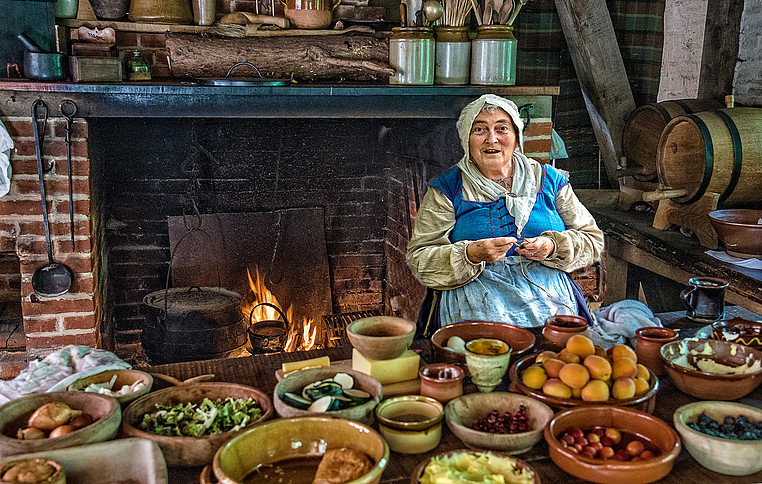
Ale House.

== History ==
The hamlet of Little Woodham was initially created in 1984 as a temporary reenactment of village life on the eve of the English Civil War by members of The English Civil War Society as part of their enactment of the fictional Battle Of Stokes Bay. Following this, Society volunteers continued the exhibition during the summers of 1984 and 1985.

When the English Civil War Society announced they would be unable to continue, local residents formed the Gosport Living History Society to take over the running of the village to preserve it as an educational resource and tourist attraction. The Gosport Borough Council provided much of the financing and administration until 1995 when the Gosport Living History Society became a registered charity and took on sole responsibility for funding and administration, and in 2007, Little Woodham won the "Best Leisure & Tourism Venue" in the "Go Gosport".

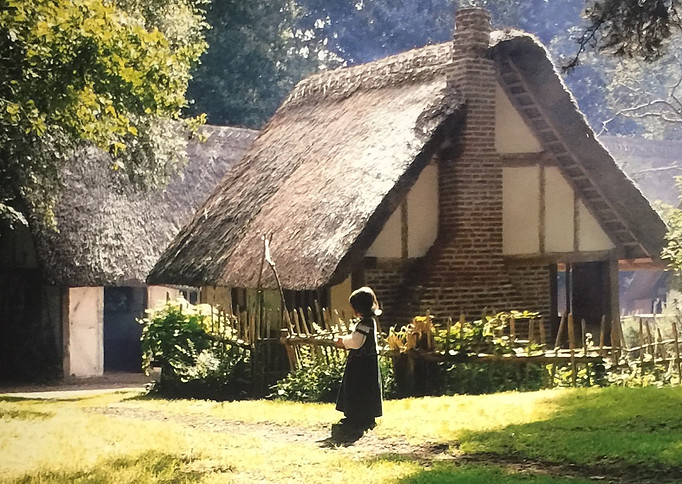
Early morning

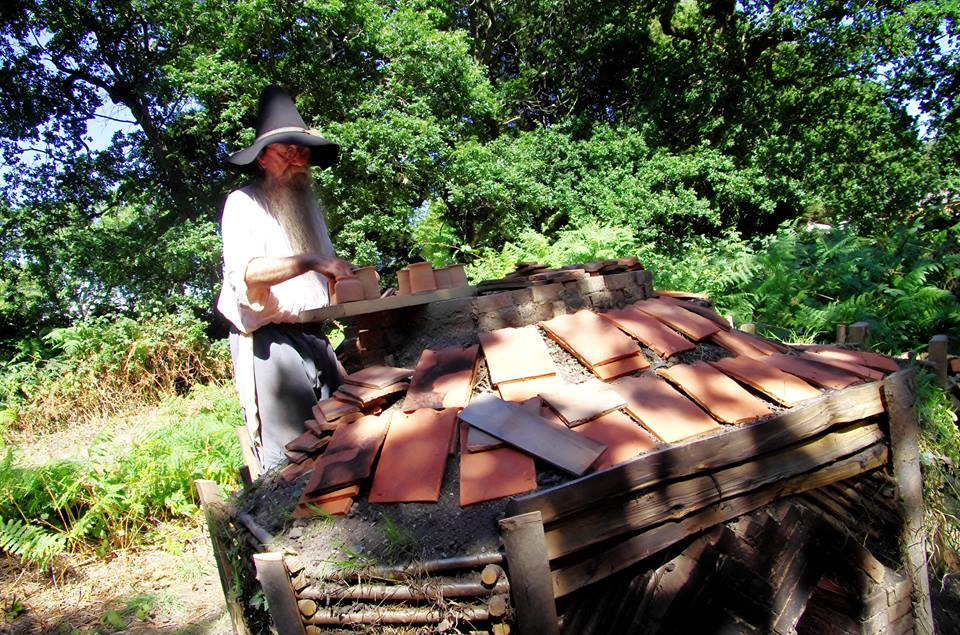
17th century kiln

== Unique to Little Woodham ==
Little Woodham has the only 17th century replica pottery kiln in the world, carefully reconstructed using the same materials and techniques. It was fired for the first time in 2015 and has been fired each year since with all the pottery made using the kick wheel turntable in the 17th century Pottery.

The 17th century coal forge was recreated using evidence gathered from an archaeological dig of a seventeenth-century blacksmith shop at Ferryland, Newfoundland (built 1622) and from various paintings and etchings from the period. Although the forge is a re-creation, the artefacts, anvils and tools used in the forge are hundreds of years old.

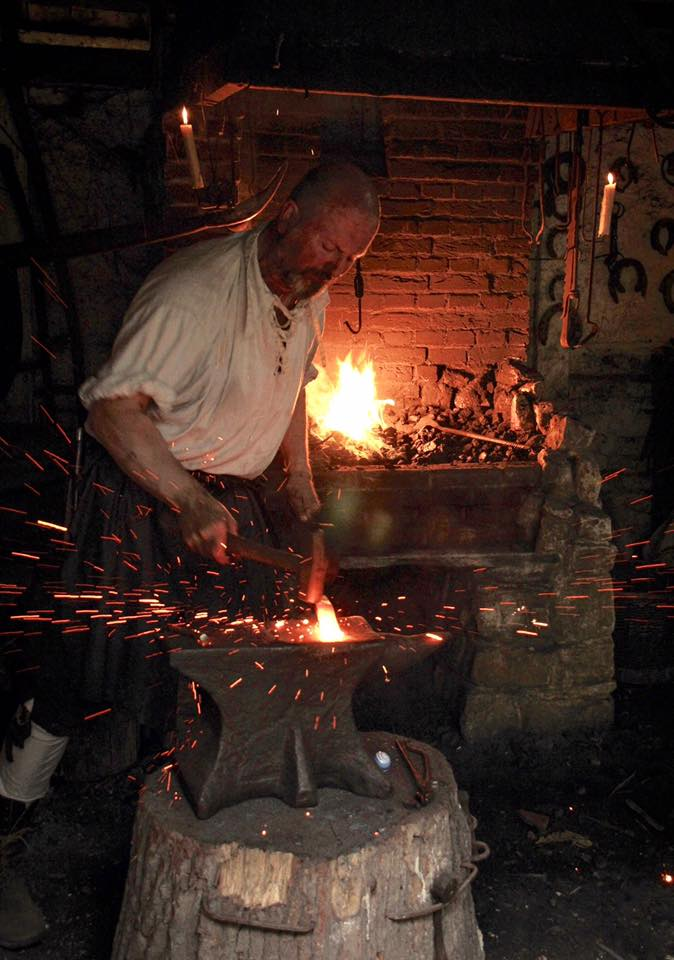
17th century coal forge and English 5th foot anvil

Little Woodham also run frequent 17th century Forge Experience days for visitors to spend a day working in the 17th century coal forge, guided by Little Woodham's blacksmith to recreate 17th century iron work and learning traditional techniques and skills using steel and wrought iron, and look at the real 17th century examples.

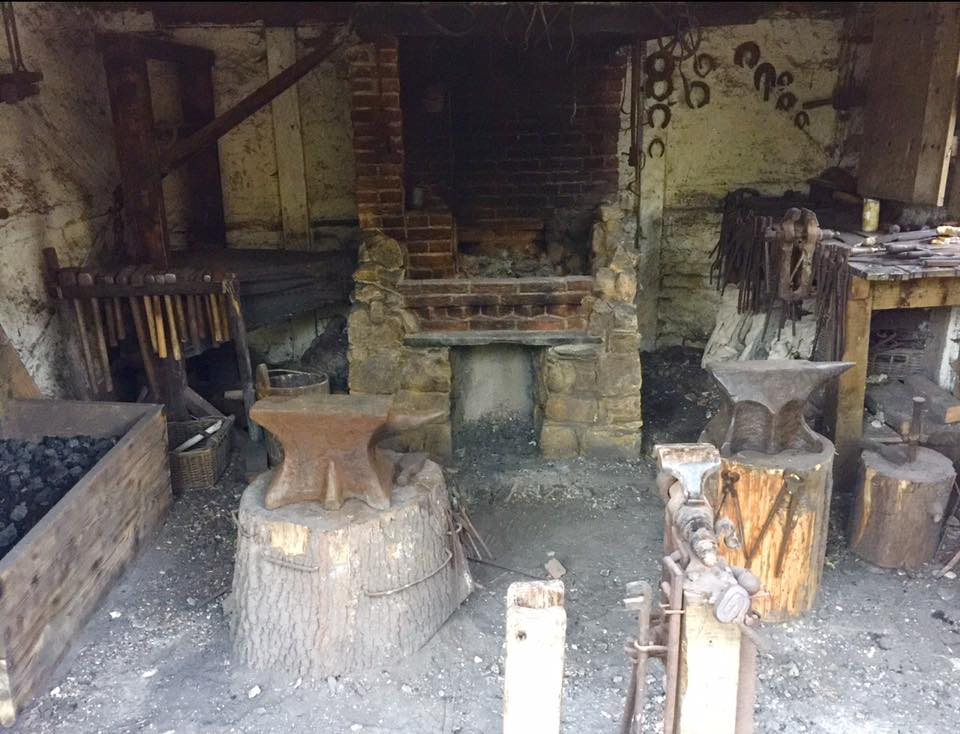
17th century Coal Forge

There are a number of other trades and crafts throughout the village, including weavers and wool dyers, a wood turner, button maker, apothecarist, scribe, trickster and barber surgeon and many more.

== Events in Little Woodham ==
May Day: story-telling, decorated houses, the Green Man and the Hobby horse.
17th century Kiln firing: The Master Potter loads up and fires the 17th century pottery kiln. This kiln is the only working 17th century replica kiln in existence, and all the pottery that will be in the kiln has been made in the 17th century potter's work shop using a kick wheel turn table.
Craft Day: A day where leather workers, walking stick makers, potters, blacksmiths, weavers, woodworkers, quilters work in the village.

== Filming at Little Woodham ==
Little Woodham has worked with a variety of film companies, including BBC, Channel 4, Channel 5 and various independent national and international film companies. Little Woodham is also a favourite location for many 3rd year film students.

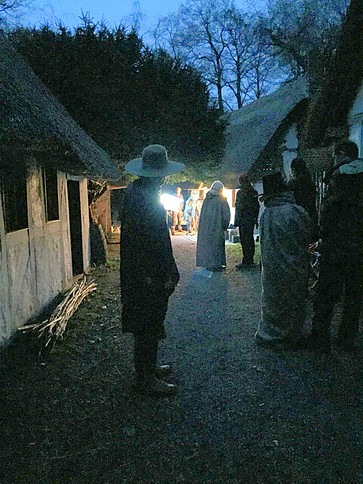
Evening filming at Little Woodham Witch Hunt: A Century of Murder presented by Dr Suzannah Lipscombe
