= Cherque Farm =

Residential development in Hampshire, England

Coordinates: 50°47.94′N 1°11.145′W

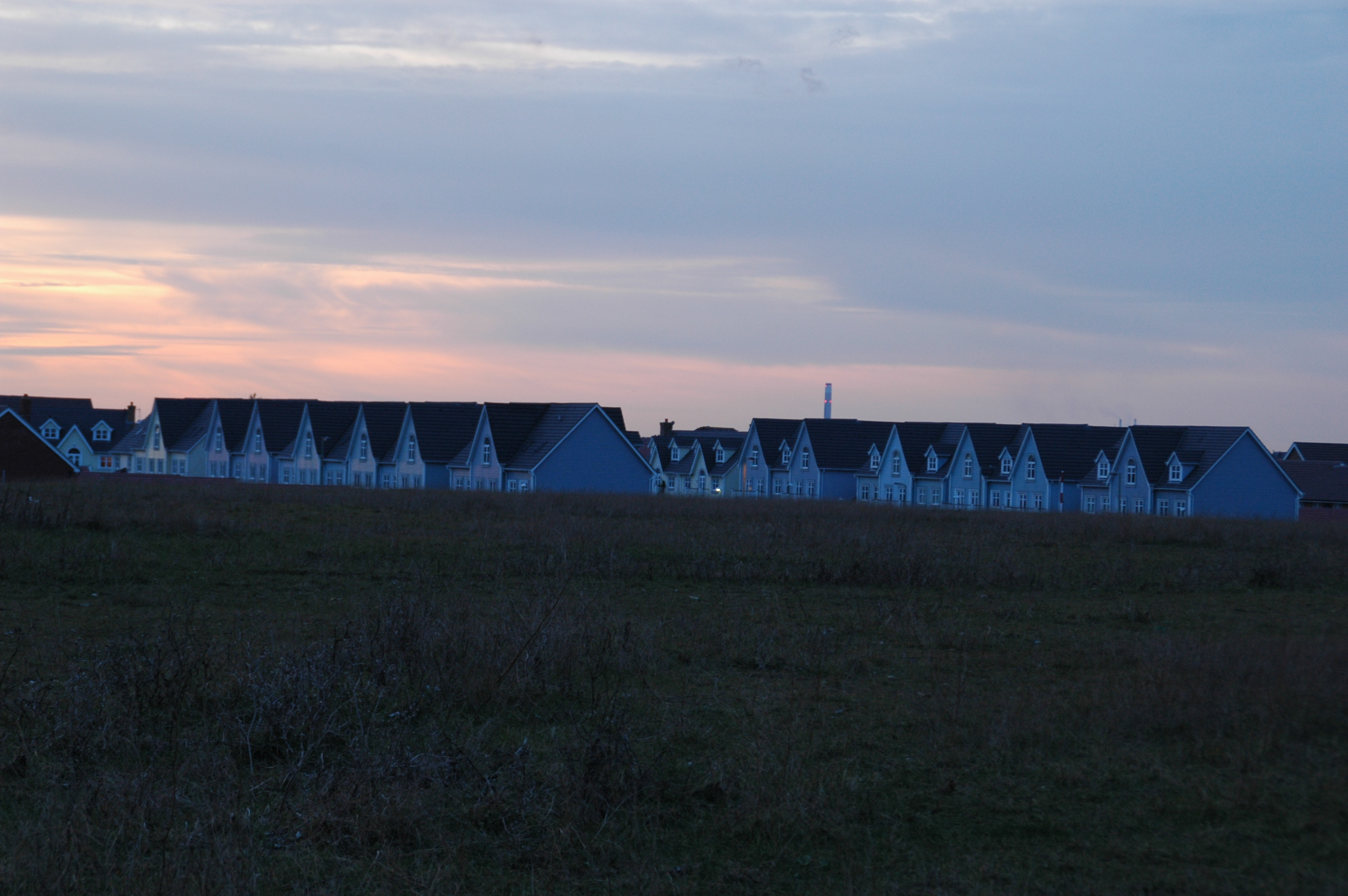
Cherque Farm South Sunset

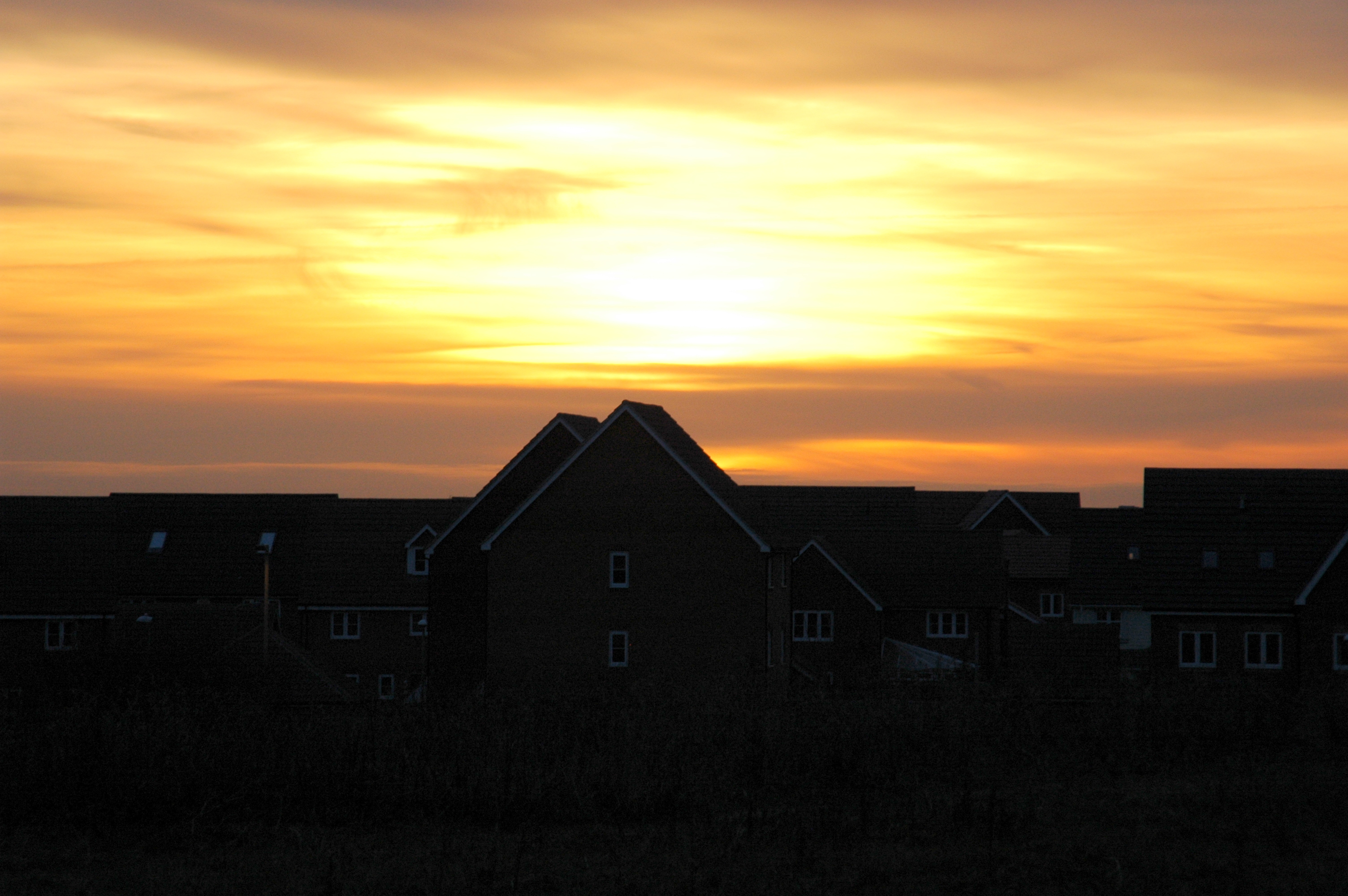
Cherque Farm South Sunset

Cherque Farm is a residential development of 1063 homes situated on the South Coast of England in Lee-on-the-Solent, Hampshire. Persimmon Homes was the prime developer of the land, but other developers such as Charles Church, Bovis and Wimpey have built properties on the estate. Building work was completed in 2008. In 2014 another 13 houses were built which added to the original 1050.

It is an area of some 100 acres (40 ha) adjoining the Alver Valley which makes up the rural gap between the town of Gosport and Lee-on-the-Solent and lies on the eastern side of Lee-on-the-Solent. A new access road, Cherque Way, forms its eastern boundary and provides links to the main road network with separate access to the site and all the adjoining facilities of this coastal location. A public community park and shops are also found on the estate.

Persimmon Homes bought the site in Hampshire from Hall Aggregates (South Coast) Ltd and Cemex UK Properties Ltd in 1999 for £29.9m. The Cherque Farm site in Lee-On-The-Solent had been used for sand and gravel extraction and, later, for landfill. Some of the landfill waste gave rise to a problem with methane gas which Persimmon had to deal with as condition of building on the site.
