= Hardway, Hampshire =

Suburb of Gosport, Hampshire, England

Coordinates: 50.807255°N 1.139085°W

Hardway
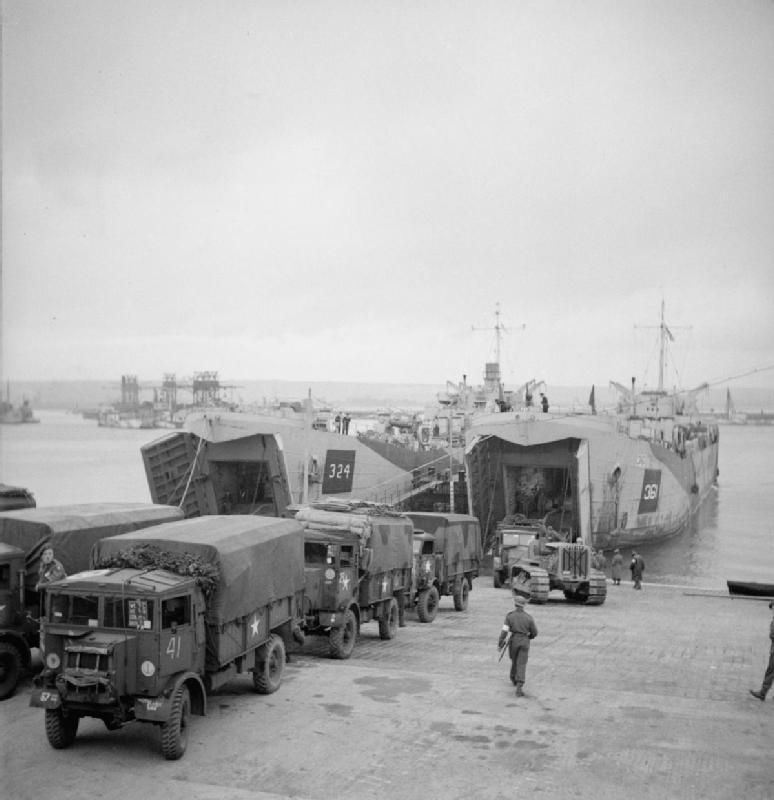
- Vehicles being loaded into LST 316 and LST 324 at Hardway, Gosport prior to the invasion of France a few days later

- Location within Hampshire
- OS grid reference: SU6075801209
- District: Gosport
- Shire county: Hampshire
- Region: South East
- Country: England
- Sovereign state: United Kingdom
- Post town: GOSPORT
- Postcode district: PO12, PO13
- Dialling code: 023
- Police: Hampshire and Isle of Wight
- Fire: Hampshire and Isle of Wight
- Ambulance: South Central
- UK Parliament: Gosport

Hardway is a suburb of the town of Gosport, in the Gosport district, in Hampshire, England. The suburb is made up of a few industrial estates, residential housing and a port. The suburb sits on the side of Portsmouth Harbour opposite to the naval base.
