= Bridgemary =

Electoral ward in Gosport, Hampshire, England

Coordinates: 50.82°N 1.17°W

- Location within Hampshire
- OS grid reference: SU5803
- Shire county: Hampshire
- Region: South East
- Country: England
- Sovereign state: United Kingdom
- Post town: Gosport
- Postcode district: PO13
- Dialling code: 023
- Police: Hampshire and Isle of Wight
- Fire: Hampshire and Isle of Wight
- Ambulance: South Central

Bridgemary is a ward in Gosport, Hampshire, England. It is situated to the north of Gosport on the A32 towards Fareham. Every year there is a carnival organized by local residents.
