= Alverstoke =

Village and parish in Hampshire, England

Coordinates: 50.78°N 1.15°W

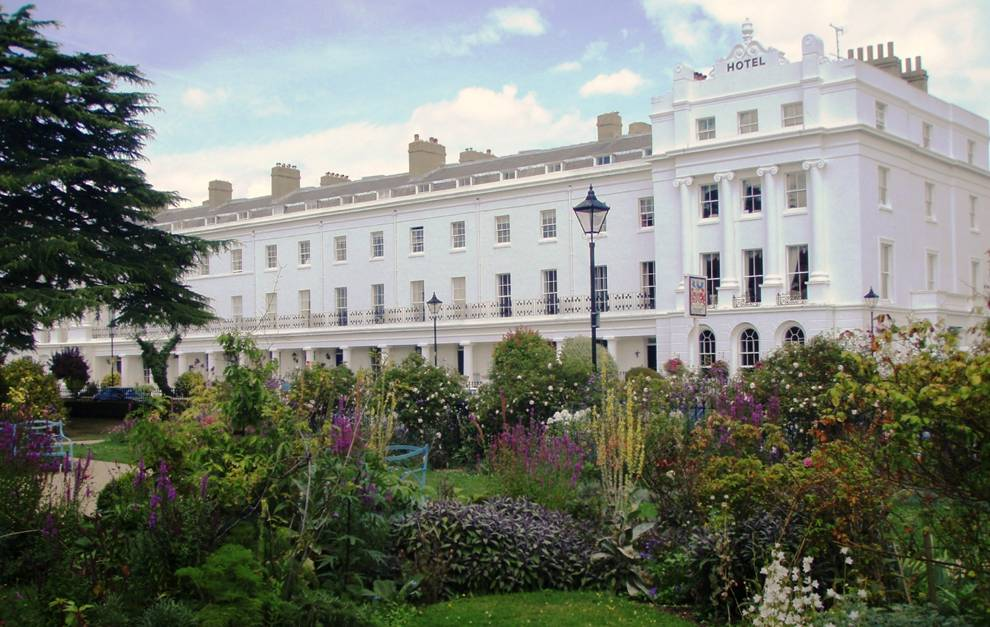
- Part of The Crescent, Angleseyville; Grade II* listed (Note: built c.1829–30)

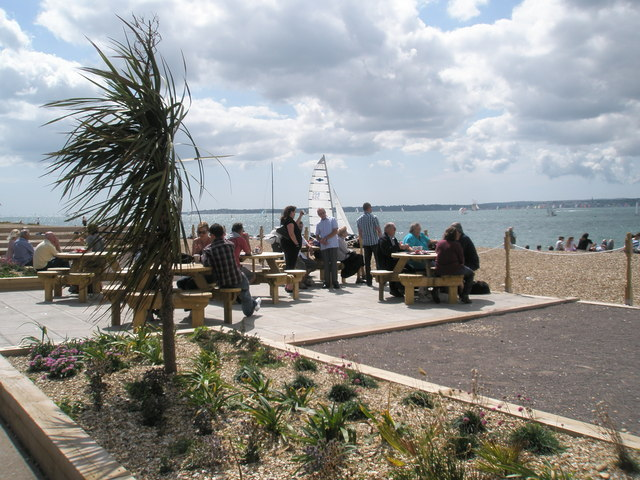
- Stokes Bay, Alverstoke

- Location within Hampshire
- District: Gosport
- Shire county: Hampshire
- Region: South East
- Country: England
- Sovereign state: United Kingdom
- Post town: GOSPORT
- Postcode district: PO12
- Dialling code: 023
- Police: Hampshire and Isle of Wight
- Fire: Hampshire and Isle of Wight
- Ambulance: South Central
- UK Parliament: Gosport

Alverstoke is a village in the borough of Gosport, on the south coast of Hampshire, England. It stretches east–west from Fort Blockhouse, Haslar to Browndown Battery, and is centred 0.5 miles (0.80 km) east of the shore of Stokes Bay and near the head of a creek which extends a mile westward from Portsmouth Harbour.

Residents of Alverstoke have at times in the 20th century been called 'The Alverstocracy' by some residents of Gosport, in a tongue-in-cheek fashion, due to higher house prices and a perceived higher social status of the area.

== History ==
The name 'Alverstoke' is most likely to be derived from a corruption of the name Alwara – an Anglo-Saxon Lady of the Manor – and Stoke, a settlement on the area of Alverstoke. Alverstoke is mentioned in the Domesday Book as Alwarestock.

Official Crown and Manorial records for the village refer to "The liberty of Alverstoke with Gosport", although the name has clearly evolved over the years: from Alwarestoch/Halwarestoke, in the 11th to 13th centuries, to Alvardestoke, in the 14th century, to Aillewardstoke, in the 15th century, and to Alverstoke, by the 16th century.

Until the early 19th century, the parish of Alverstoke measured some 4.5 miles from north to south, and 2.5 miles from east to west, covering most of present-day Gosport. The parish still stretched north, adjoining Fareham and Titchfield parishes., south to the Solent, east as far as Portsmouth Harbour, and west to the parish of Rowner, into the 20th century. However, large parts of the north and east of the parish were split into separate parishes between 1840 and 1913.

In the late 19th century Alverstoke became built up, and some of the fields separating it from Gosport disappeared. Alverstoke then formed part of an Urban District, which prevented the need for creation of a parish council or meeting. From 1932 to 1974 Alverstoke was the only parish in the district of Gosport. Today, the ecclesiastical parish, which was once a large agricultural one containing the villages of Alverstoke and Gosport, comprises a smaller and mainly residential area now within the Borough of Gosport.

By the early 19th century, as seaside towns became fashionable for polite society, an area known as Angleseyville was developed by the speculator Robert Cruikshank, and named in honour of the Marquis of Anglesey. This new area was to contain a racecourse, chapel, baths and pumphouse, and genteel gardens, a hotel, and fine townhouses emulating the grand Georgian crescents of the day but Cruikshank speculated on an architect who was only 21 and somewhat untested.

Although the hotel was erected first, such that purchasers could see what would be built, the scheme overall was not a financial success, and was therefore only partially completed. Its St. Mark's Chapel had never become more than a chapel of ease to the local parish church only a quarter of a mile away, and was demolished by the early 20th century. Nonetheless, its small burial plot still contains 261 known burials, including many with high society connections: nine admirals, eight generals, two baronets, and various members of the Churchill, Nelson, Jellicoe, Walpole and Bonham-Carter (Note: Hyphens were first used to separate commonly joined terms in the 1920s before which it was Bonham Carter) families (and which started being used as a graveyard even before the chapel's dedication).

Today, the Crescent stands as testimony to what might have been, but still only fulfils half of the original design. It does, however, still house the Anglesey Arms Hotel (where Queen Victoria is known to have stayed when travelling to and from Osborne House on the Isle of Wight – the train line used to run direct to Stokes Bay, where there was once a jetty). The Crescent is now Grade II* listed, and its award-winning Georgian-era gardens (2009 – Gold Award, 2010 – Gold Award 'It's Your Neighbourhood' – Outstanding Small Park of the Year, 2011 – Gold Award 'It's Your Neighbourhood' – Outstanding Small Park of the Year. 2012 – Gold Award 'It's Your Neighbourhood' – Outstanding 2012 – 'It's Your Neighbourhood' – National Certificate of Distinction Green Flags awarded 2010, 2011, 2012, 2013) are open to the public to visit all year round.

== Geography ==
The district and village of Alverstoke sits West, Northwest and immediately south of Stoke Lake, from South west of Haslar Road, Clayhall Road West side – towards Alverstoke Green, south to Crescent Road, west to Stokes Bay Road and up to the south side of Bury Road.

Several of Palmerston's Follies are sited within the parish, including Fort Gilkicker, a 19th-century coastal battery fort, which is located at the eastern end of Stokes Bay, where it sits across a wide curved natural headland (promontory) taken up by Gosport and Stokes Bay Golf Club. To the east is Fort Monckton. There is also a controversial animal testing facility.

== Religion ==
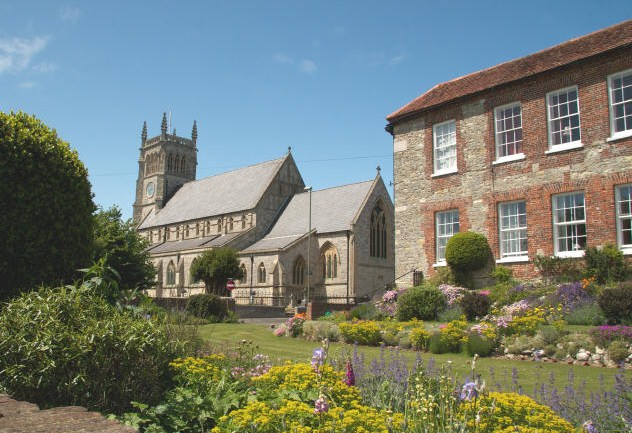
St Mary's Parish Church

The Grade II listed parish church of St. Mary is one of three Church of England churches in the parish, the others being St Faith's Church by Tribe Road and St Francis, Alverstoke (0.5 miles ESE) between St Francis Road and Waterloo Road, Haslar. (A Chapel dedicated to St. Luke also exists within the grounds of Haslar.) St. Mary's is of medieval origin, but has been significantly rebuilt and altered over the years. The original church was entirely replaced by the present structure, as designed by Henry Woodyer in the decorated style, when rebuilt 1863–85: its chancel was completed in 1865, and extends to three bays, two having arches to the north and south chapels; its wide nave by Woodyer was constructed in 1885 and has five arches and a south porch. Its western tower was built in 1906.

== Notable connections ==
- Infanta Maria Francisca of Portugal, wife of the Carlist pretender to the Spanish throne, died in the rectory in 1834 whilst awaiting for her property in the Crescent to be completed.
- Bishop Samuel Wilberforce, accepted the rectory of Alverstoke in October 1840
- John Wickham Legg, physician and writer, was born here on 28 December 1843
- Edward Scrope Shrapnel, Canadian painter, was born here on 12 January 1845
- General Montagu Burrows (1775–1848) retired to Angleseyville and is buried here

== Notes and references ==
Notes
