= Rowner =

Coordinates: 50.822°N 1.176°W

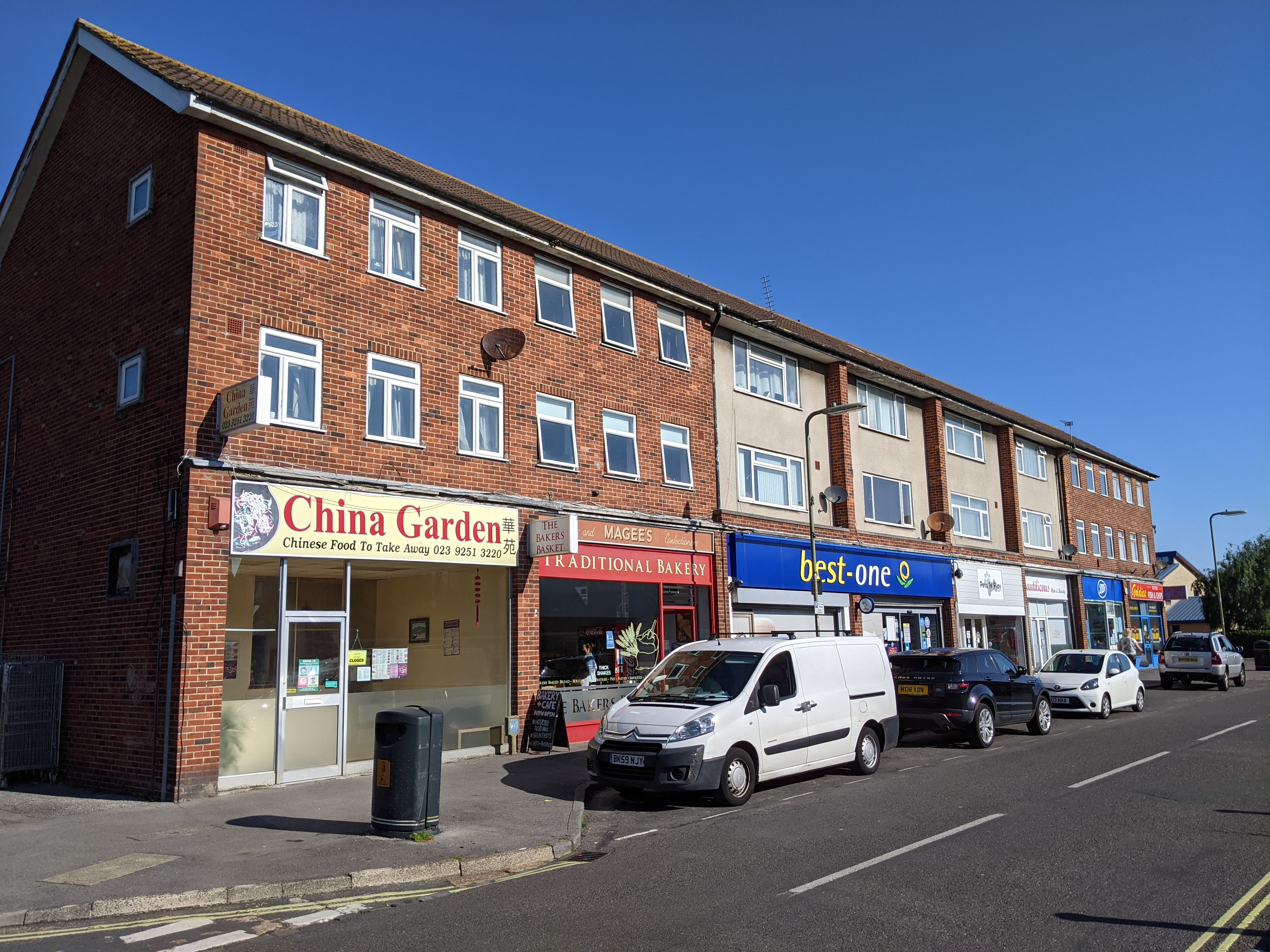
- Shops in Rowner

- Location within Hampshire
- District: Gosport
- Shire county: Hampshire
- Region: South East
- Country: England
- Sovereign state: United Kingdom

Rowner is a small settlement which forms part of the borough of Gosport, on the south coast of Hampshire, England.

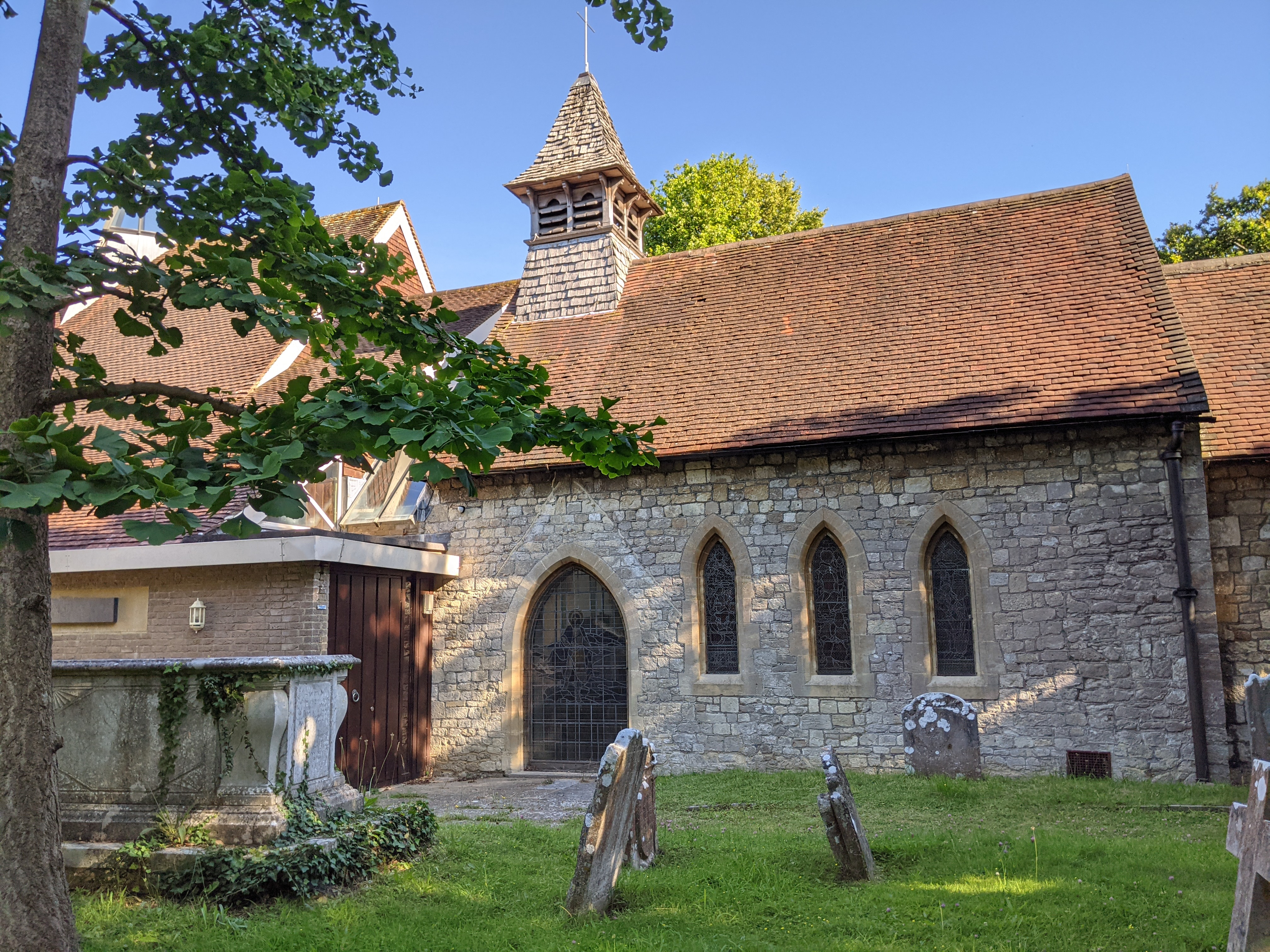
St Mary The Virgin Church, Rowner

== History ==
As Roman burial shrouds were found in the grounds of the church, it would seem to indicate there was a presence in the area at the time. However, it is more generally accepted that a small hamlet was established between 700 and 900AD. The spelling of the place name differs slightly from its mention in The Anglo Saxon Charter and Domesday Book. At the time of Domesday Book of 1086 the manor of Rowner was held by William Mauduit. The family of Mauduit seems to have been of considerable importance at this time as the possessor of large estates in Hampshire, and its members were among the chamberlains of Henry I and Henry II. Bonn's edition of Anglo-Saxon Chronicle confirms that King Henry I, visited Rowner in 1114. In the 13th century Rowner passed out of the Mauduit family, and in 1240–1 Elias de la Falaise was holding land in Rowner. He died in 1254, and his brother William died in possession of the manor in the same year. Before 1277 the property had escheated to the Crown by the felony of William de la Falaise, grandson of William, and was granted in that year to Sir William le Brune, chamberlain to the king. The manor then stayed solidly in the Brune family until the death of Charles Brune in 1769, when the family became extinct in the male line. By his will his estates eventually devolved onto his grand-nephew the Rev. Charles Prideaux-Brune of Prideaux Place, Padstow, Cornwall, and it remained in the possession of the Prideaux-Brune family into the 20th century.

The medieval church of Saint Mary the Virgin is the oldest church in Gosport, dating from the 12th century, however it was extensively modified in 1874. The church was expanded in 1968 and then rebuilt in 1992 after a fire. The 19th century Palmerston Forts of Fort Rowner, Fort Brockhurst, and Fort Grange, lie to the east and south. According to the Anglo-Saxon Chronicle, Henry I held court in the parish in 1114 before boarding to travel to his estates in Normandy.

As the start of the 20th century the village of Rowner, only consisted of a small number of old cottages scattered over a long narrow strip of land, the southern and eastern portions of which had been bought by the War Office for the land defences of Portsmouth.

Arriving by helicopter on 19 May 2000, Queen Elizabeth II, visited the engineering training centre at HMS Sultan in Rowner, taking the salute from 820 sailors, who were on parade with the Band of the Royal Marines.

On 6 December 1966, a new housing estate complete with a thousand new flats, maisonettes and houses was opened as accommodation for service personnel and their families, along with a shopping precinct, that earned this side of Rowner the nickname, "The Concrete Jungle". These properties eventually passed into the ownership of the local council and Housing Associations, but were largely demolished in the early part of the 21st century during the £145, 000, 000 Rowner Renewal Scheme, which provided hundreds of more modern homes and commercial dwellings. Rowner has one of the largest BMX courses in the south of England, allowing the Gosport BMX Club, to compete in, and host national events such as the HSBC UK National BMX Series. Commercial premises in Rowner include a Tesco Superstore, a Subway, and that of The Alver Valley Garden Centre.

In 2011, Channel 4 filmed the Tony Robinson's God's And Monster's programme at Little Woodham 17th Century Village. In 2018, the same location was used for the BBC's Doctor Who episode The Witchfinders.

In 1931 the civil parish had a population of 105. On 1 April 1932 the parish was abolished and merged with Alverstoke. It is now in the unparished area of Gosport.
