= New towns in the United Kingdom =

Proposed towns in the UK following WWII

The new towns in the United Kingdom were planned under the powers of the New Towns Act 1946 (9 & 10 Geo. 6. c. 68) and later acts to relocate people from poor or bombed-out housing following World War II. Designated new towns were placed under the supervision of a development corporation, and were developed in three waves. Later developments included the "expanded towns": existing towns which were substantially expanded to accommodate what was called the "overspill" population from densely populated areas of deprivation.

== Historical precedents ==
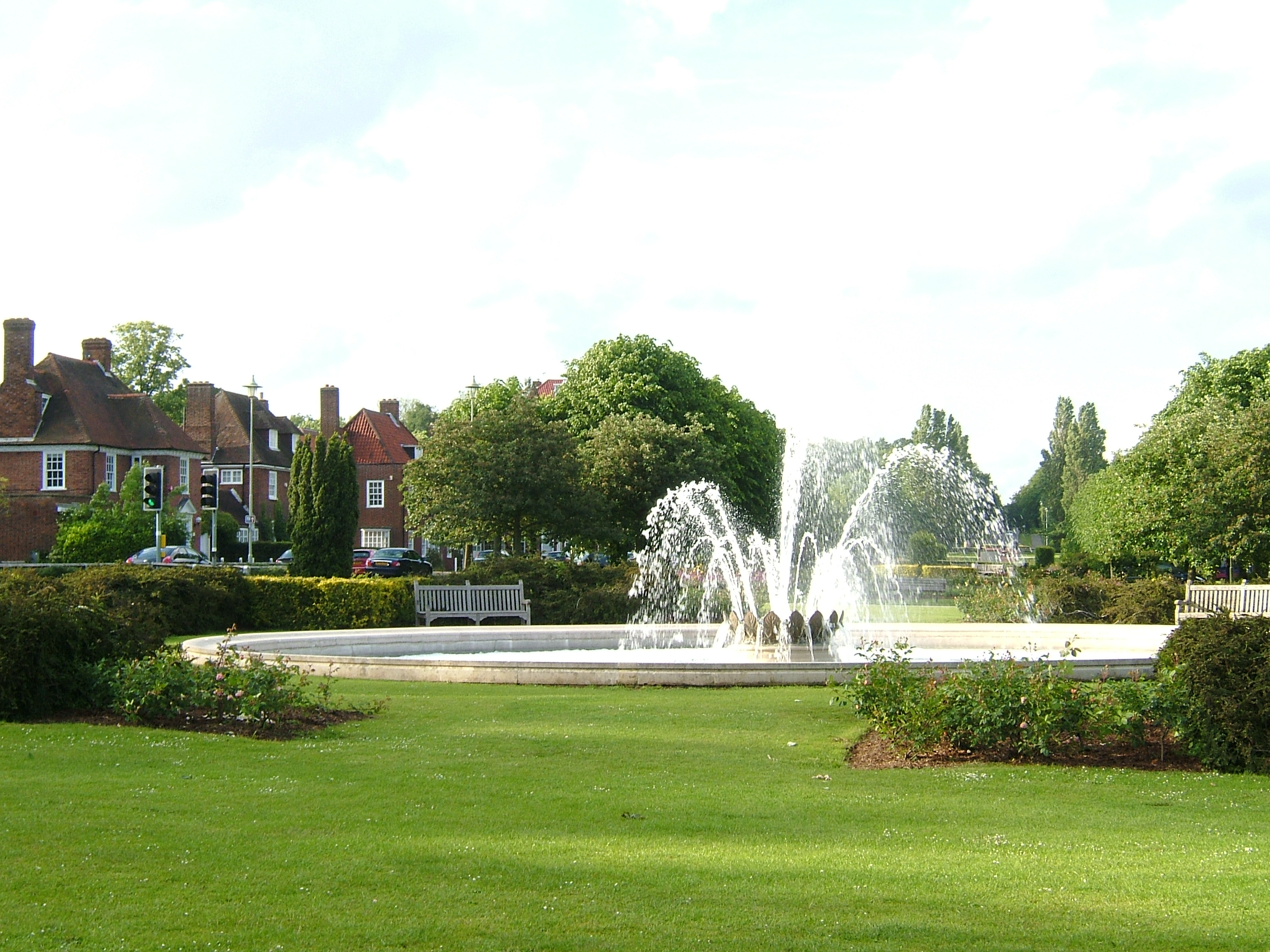
Park and fountain in Welwyn Garden City, one of the two Garden Cities. Welwyn Garden City was also later designated as a new town

=== Garden cities ===
The concept of the "garden city" was first envisaged by Ebenezer Howard in his 1898 book To-morrow: A Peaceful Path to Real Reform, as an alternative to the pollution and overcrowding in Britain's growing urban areas. Taking inspiration from the model villages of Port Sunlight and Bournville, he saw garden cities as the "joyous union" of town and country, providing a much better quality of life for those who lived there.

Two garden cities were built, both in Hertfordshire – Letchworth, founded in 1903, and Welwyn Garden City, founded in 1920.

The underlying principles of garden cities (including community engagement, well designed housing, easily accessible recreational and shopping facilities, and an integrated transport network) were influential in the development of the post-war new towns movement.

=== Overspill estates ===
An "overspill estate" is a housing estate planned and built for the housing of excess population in urban areas, both from the natural increase of population and often in order to rehouse people from decaying inner city areas, usually as part of the process of slum clearance. They were created on the outskirts of most large British towns and during most of the 20th century, with new towns being an alternative approach outside London after World War II. The objective of this was to bring more economic activity to these smaller communities, whilst relieving pressure on overpopulated areas of major cities.

- London County Council built housing developments affixed to towns outside its jurisdiction, of which Becontree, Dagenham (which became part of Greater London in 1965) was the largest. It was built in the 1920s and 1930s.
- Seacroft in Leeds was built from 1934 when Leeds City Council bought 1,000 acres (4.0 km^{2}) for municipal housing. Most houses and blocks of flats were built after World War II. The council had planned for Seacroft to be a "satellite town within the city boundary"
- Wythenshawe was built on former rural land in the north of Cheshire between the 1920s and early 1970s to rehouse families from the inner city slums of Manchester as an overspill estate. Other Manchester overspill estates include Hattersley (mostly built during the 1960s), Gamesley, and Haughton Green.
- Castlemilk, Drumchapel, Easterhouse and Pollok in Glasgow.
- Castle Vale in Birmingham, which was built in the 1960s in the extreme north-east of the city.

== List of new towns ==
=== England ===
==== First wave ====
Animated film by the Central Office of Information about post-war new towns and their planning

The first wave of independent new towns was intended to help alleviate the housing shortages following the Second World War, beyond the green belt around London. Two sites in County Durham were also designated. These designations were made under the New Towns Act 1946 (9 & 10 Geo. 6. c. 68).

- Stevenage, Hertfordshire (designated 11 November 1946)
- Crawley, Sussex (designated 9 January 1947)
- Hemel Hempstead, Hertfordshire (designated 4 February 1947)
- Harlow, Essex (designated 25 March 1947)
- Newton Aycliffe, County Durham (designated 19 April 1947 as Aycliffe New Town)
- Peterlee, County Durham (designated 10 March 1948, as Easington New Town)
- Welwyn Garden City and Hatfield, Hertfordshire (both designated 20 May 1948)
- Basildon, Essex (designated 4 January 1949)
- Bracknell, Berkshire (designated 17 June 1949)
- Corby, Northamptonshire (designated 1 April 1950)

==== Second wave ====
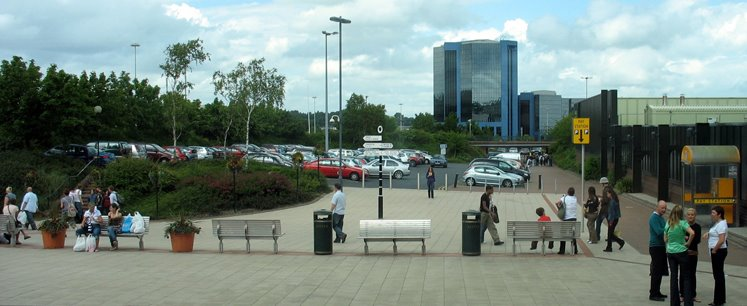
The town of Telford (formerly Dawley New Town) was created from a number of towns which were joined around a central service area.

The second wave (1961–1964) was likewise initiated to alleviate housing shortfalls. Two of the locations below (Redditch and Dawley New Town – later renamed Telford) are near the West Midlands conurbation and were designed for Birmingham and Wolverhampton overspill; another two (Runcorn and Skelmersdale) are near Merseyside and were intended as overspill for the city of Liverpool.

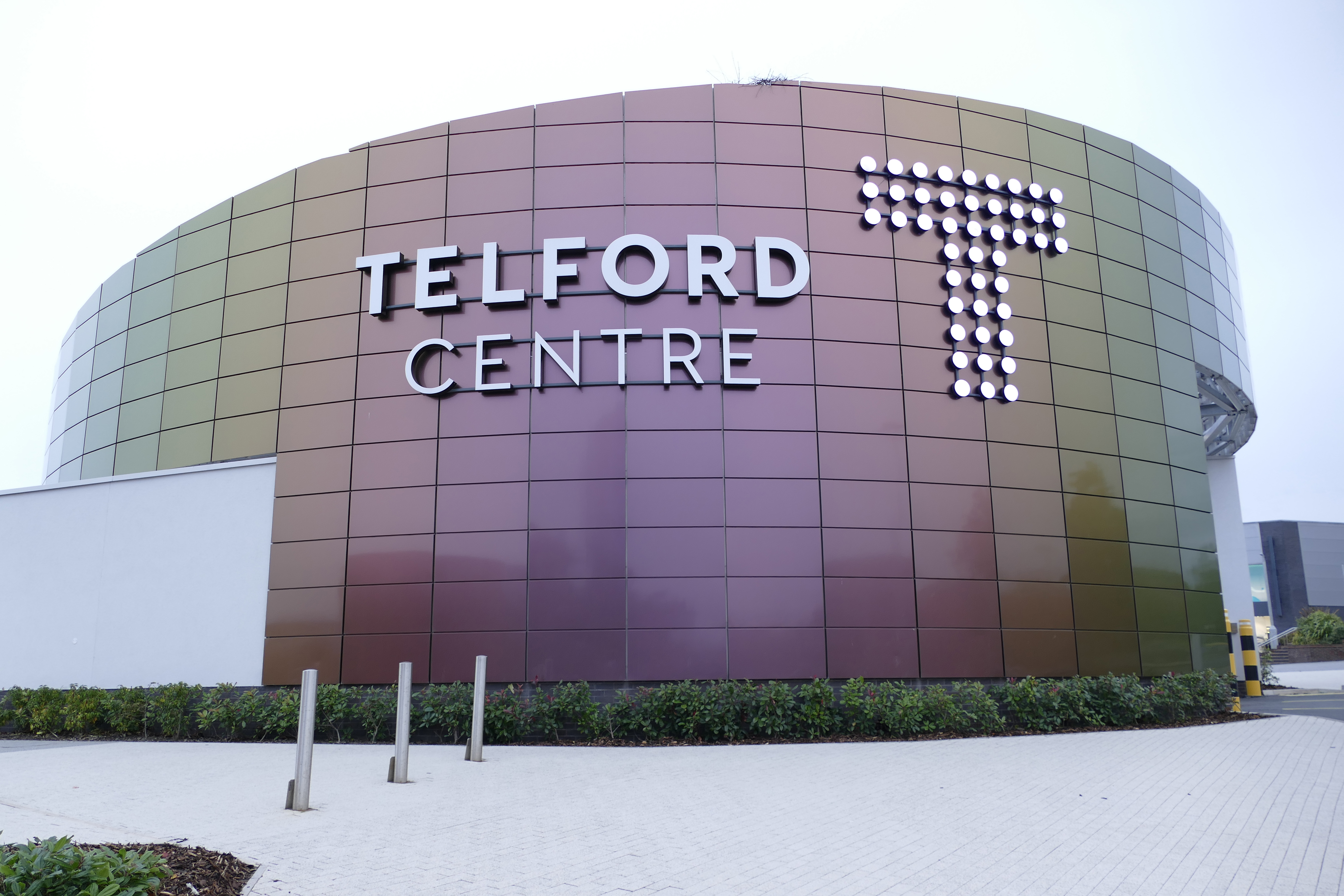
Telford Centre

- Skelmersdale, Lancashire (designated 9 October 1961)
- Dawley New Town, Shropshire (designated 16 January 1963)
- Redditch, Worcestershire (designated 10 April 1964)
- Runcorn, Cheshire (designated 10 April 1964)
- Washington, Tyne and Wear (designated 24 July 1964)

==== Third wave ====
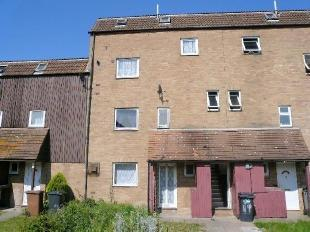
New Town architecture in Peterborough

The third wave of new towns (1967–1970) allowed for additional growth, chiefly further north from the previous London new towns, among them "Central Lancashire New Town" and Warrington. Dawley New Town was redesignated as Telford New Town, with a much larger area, as overspill for Birmingham and nearby towns including Wolverhampton. With a target population of 250,000 and a planning brief to become the first "new city", the largest of these was Milton Keynes at the northern edge of the South East, about halfway between Birmingham and London. In the East Midlands, the existing town of Northampton was expanded. The city of Peterborough was designated as a new town to accommodate overspill from London.

- Milton Keynes, Buckinghamshire (designated 23 January 1967)
- Peterborough, Cambridgeshire (designated 21 July 1967)
- Northampton, Northamptonshire (designated 14 February 1968)
- Warrington, Cheshire (designated 26 April 1968), resulting in the Birchwood development
- Telford, Shropshire (designated 29 November 1968)
- Central Lancashire New Town, Lancashire (designated 26 March 1970), which covered a conurbation focused on the towns of Preston, Chorley and Leyland, and expanded Clayton-le-Woods into a larger urban area with the Clayton Brook development. Its area also included what are today large towns or villages, albeit they were smaller at the time of the new town designation: Bamber Bridge, Coppull, Penwortham and Euxton. It was initially planned to adjoin these areas into one city, with the name Redrose suggested, but after years of dissatisfaction with its progress amongst locals and politicians, its Development Corporation was ultimately disbanded in 1985 by the Thatcher government. Central Lancashire was retrospectively described as "more akin to an Urban Development Corporation" and "never intended to be recognised as a new town in its own right".

==== Yate and South Woodham Ferrers ====
Yate in Gloucestershire and South Woodham Ferrers in Essex were developed between the 1950s and 1970s, coinciding with the creation of the above new towns, and Yate pointedly marketed itself as a "new town" during the 1960s. However, they differ in that they were not commissioned by any of the New Town Acts.

==== 21st century ====
In September 2024, the new Labour government established a New Towns Taskforce to identify a new generation of new towns in England. A year later, the taskforce recommended 12 locations:

Proposal	Location	Type	Status
Adlington	Cheshire East	Standalone	Eliminated
Brabazon	South Gloucestershire	Corridor	
Crews Hill and Chase Park	Crews Hill, Enfield	Expansion	Priority
Heyford Park	RAF Upper Heyford, Cherwell, Oxfordshire	Brownfield	Eliminated
Leeds South Bank	Leeds	Brownfield	Priority
Manchester Victoria North	Manchester	Brownfield	
Marlcombe	East Devon	Standalone	Eliminated
Milton Keynes	Buckinghamshire	Expansion	
Plymouth	Devon	Densification	Eliminated
Tempsford	Bedfordshire	Standalone	Priority
Thamesmead	Southeast London	Expansion	
Worcestershire Parkway	Wychavon	Expansion	Eliminated

Tempsford, Leeds South Bank, and Crews Hill were identified by the government as the three locations where work was likely to commence first. In March 2026, the government announced that list was being reduced to seven, with Adlington, Heyford Park, Marlcombe, Plymouth and Wychavon being dropped from the list.

=== Wales ===
- Cwmbran, Torfaen (designated 4 November 1949)
- Newtown, Powys (designated 18 December 1967)
- Coedffranc (Currently expanding)

Llanharan and Oakdale, though not designated new towns, owe their expansion from small villages to being targeted for housing developments in the 21st Century.

=== Scotland ===
Six new towns in Scotland were designated between 1947 and 1973, mostly for the overspill population of Glasgow.

- East Kilbride (designated 6 May 1947)
- Glenrothes (designated 30 June 1948)
- Cumbernauld (designated 9 December 1955, extended 19 March 1973)
- Livingston (designated 16 April 1962)
- Irvine (designated 9 November 1966, and encompassing the existing settlement of Kilwinning)
- Stonehouse (designated 17 July 1973, de-designated in 1976 after fewer than 100 houses had been built)

==== Subsequent developments ====
- Blindwells: new settlement under construction between Tranent and Port Seton in East Lothian
- Chapelton of Elsick (in progress)
- Countesswells: partially constructed new settlement west of Aberdeen between Cults and Kingswells
- Dalgety Bay: a new town developed in the 1970s and 1980s in Fife
- Dargavel: new town being built on former BAE munitions works site adjacent to Bishopton in Renfrewshire
- Erskine and Inchinnan, new town developed in the 1970s and 1980s in Renfrewshire, initially by the Scottish Special Housing Association
- Ravenscraig: former steelworks site in North Lanarkshire (in progress)
- Shawfair: new settlement under construction in south-east Edinburgh spanning the City of Edinburgh Council and Midlothian Council administrative boundaries
- Tornagrain: a new town near Inverness (in progress)
- Tweedbank: village built in the 1970s on a greenfield site in the central Scottish Borders, initially by a government body, the Scottish Special Housing Association
- Winchburgh, West Lothian. Expansion from village to a new town.

==== Future developments ====
- Forestmill: new settlement proposed in Clackmannanshire in close proximity to the Fife Council administrative boundary
- Owenstown: new settlement proposed in the South Lanarkshire area to the south of Lanark

=== Northern Ireland ===
The New Towns Act (Northern Ireland) 1965 gave the Minister of Development of the Government of Northern Ireland the power to designate an area as a new town, and to appoint a development commission. An order could be made to transfer municipal functions of all or part of any existing local authorities to the commission, which took the additional title of urban district council, although unelected. This was done in the case of Craigavon.

The New Towns Amendment Act 1968 was passed to enable the establishment of the Londonderry Development Commission to replace the County Borough and rural district of Londonderry, and implement the Londonderry Area Plan. On 3 April 1969, the development commission took over the municipal functions of the two councils, the area becoming Londonderry Urban District.

- Craigavon (designated 26 July 1965)
- Antrim (designated 1966)
- Ballymena (designated 1967)
- Derry (designated 5 February 1969)

=== Map of designated new towns ===
The map below shows all new towns designated under the New Towns Act 1946 and its successors, plus the seven sites confirmed by the New Towns Taskforce in March 2026. Markers are colour-coded by designation wave (England), constituent country, or as proposed (grey), and clicking a marker opens that town's article.

Designated new towns in the United Kingdom — click a marker to open its article.
First wave (England), 1946–1950 Second wave (England), 1961–1964 Third wave (England), 1967–1970 Wales Scotland Northern Ireland Proposed (Taskforce, March 2026)

== Other "overspill" developments ==
During the same period as the new town scheme, several other towns underwent local authority led expansion as "overspills" to larger urban areas, but were not officially designated as new towns, among these were:

- Haverhill, Suffolk - London
- Cramlington, Northumberland – Newcastle
- Daventry, Northamptonshire – Birmingham
- Hattersley, Tameside – Manchester Corporation
- Killingworth, Tyne and Wear – Newcastle
- Kirkby, Merseyside – Liverpool
- Tamworth, Staffordshire – Birmingham
- Winsford, Cheshire – Liverpool & Manchester
- Stockbridge Village, Merseyside – Liverpool
- Gamesley, Derbyshire – Manchester
- Eastfield, North Yorkshire - Scarborough

== Subsequent town expansion schemes ==
No new towns have been designated under the New Towns Act in England since 1970 (and Scotland since 1973). Several new large scale developments have been founded, some of which have declared themselves to be towns, such as Cranbrook in Devon. Others, such as Sherburn in Elmet, were granted town status after (usually pre-planned) housing developments in the area meant that they outgrew their origins as small villages.

A number of times, disused RAF stations and barracks have been selected as locations to establish these types of new settlement.

More recently, a number of developments have been settlements designated "garden villages". They have been described as "modern market towns with a focus on mixed use", despite the use of "village" in their titles, and the websites for several designated garden villages have acknowledged that they draw direct inspiration from Ebeneezer Howard's original "Garden City concept" in their designs. In some cases, the garden villages have used locations recommended by Prime Minister Gordon Brown as part of a previous, scrapped vision to build ten environmentally friendly eco-towns. Much like in the case of the eco-towns, emphasis has been placed on the garden villages being eco-friendly, "putting green, wildlife friendly spaces at the heart of development". The first in the latest wave of garden villages to start development were announced by the government in January 2017. Whilst some of these were conceptualised as extensions of existing towns, others centered around the planned urbanisation of previously rural villages, or are outright new settlements. Around the time of the announcement, fourteen of the proposed sites for these garden villages were covered in the press, some of which have been cancelled since, but those that went ahead and can be classified as distinct rather than an existing town or city extension have been listed below.

The following is a list of large developments since the 1970s:

- Alconbury Weald, Cambridgeshire
- Arborfield Green, Berkshire
- Aylesham Garden Village, Kent
- Bar Hill, Cambridgeshire
- Bradley Stoke, Gloucestershire
- Brampton, Cambridgeshire
- Broadnook Garden Village, Leicestershire
- Buckshaw Village, Euxton, Lancashire
- Cambourne, Cambridgeshire
- Cranbrook, Devon
- Daresbury Garden Village, Cheshire
- Dickens Heath, West Midlands
- Eastfield, North Yorkshire
- Ebbsfleet Garden City, Kent
- Fairham, Nottinghamshire
- Garendon Park, Leicestershire
- Great Haddon, Cambridgeshire
- Greater Willington, County Durham
- Halsnead Garden Village, Merseyside
- Hartland Village, Hampshire
- Haxby, North Yorkshire
- Heyford Park, Oxfordshire
- Hilton, Derbyshire
- Ingleby Barwick, North Yorkshire
- Kings Hill, Kent
- Langarth Garden Village, Cornwall
- Ledsham Garden Village, Cheshire
- Locking Parklands, Somerset
- Longcross Garden Village, Surrey
- Long Marston Garden Village, Warwickshire
- Martlesham Heath, Suffolk
- New Lubbesthorpe, Leicestershire
- Newton Garden Village, Nottinghamshire
- Northstowe, Cambridgeshire
- Red Lodge, Suffolk
- Sherburn in Elmet, North Yorkshire
- Sherford, Devon
- Shortstown and Cardington, Bedfordshire
- Thorpebury, Leicestershire
- Upper Rissington, Gloucestershire
- Valley Park, Hampshire
- Waterbeach New Town, Cambridgeshire
- Waverley, South Yorkshire
- Welborne, Hampshire
- West Carclaze Garden Village, Cornwall
- West Moors, Dorset
- Whiteley, Hampshire
- Withymoor Village, West Midlands
- Wixams, Bedfordshire
- Woodford Garden Village, Greater Manchester
- Wynyard Garden Village, County Durham

The following have been announced, but development on them has not yet been started, or they are awaiting planning permission to be granted:

- A garden village at the site of Dalton Barracks, Oxfordshire
- At the site of RAF Halton, Buckinghamshire
- At the site of RAF Wyton, Cambridgeshire
- Berinsfield Garden Village, Oxfordshire
- Bradbourne, Kent
- Buckover Garden Village, Gloucestershire
- Clowne Garden Village, Derbyshire
- Dunton Hills Garden Village, Essex
- Godley Green Garden Village, Greater Manchester
- Huncoat Garden Village, Lancashire
- Isley Woodhouse, Leicestershire
- Maltkiln, North Yorkshire
- North Manydown and South Manydown Garden Communities, Hampshire
- Otterpool Park, Kent
- South East Faversham, Kent
- Worcestershire Parkway New Town, Worcestershire

Outside of designations such as new town or garden village, some previously existing English villages which were not suburban in character, or lacked facilities comparable with those in a UK town or city, have seen expansion at a dramatic rate due to being selected as locations for large scale newbuild housing schemes, and development of a better equipped high street in conjunction with this. Whether a parish council describes the settlement it administers as a town or village (known as the "styling" of a council) does not make any difference to the legal powers it holds in England, therefore many villages experiencing this kind of growth have not seen it as an immediate concern to re-classify themselves as towns, but effectively function similarly to the emerging garden villages or new towns. Since the 2010s, situations like this have become more commonplace, with recent urbanised villages including:

- Balsall Common, West Midlands. In 2018, the village's parish council confirmed in a neighbourhood plan document that there was a long term plan to build as many as 1,700 new homes here. As of the 2020s, several developments have since commenced or been approved, currently amounting around 450 of these.
- Billingshurst and Southwater, West Sussex. Both these villages in Horsham District have an extensive history of being targeted for expansion. In Southwater, this process started earlier, with two busy periods of development of new homes throughout the 1970s and 1980s. This then picked up again at a rapid rate in Southwater, as well as Billingshurst, from the 2010s to the present. It was reported by 2019 that 1,250 new homes had been built in Billingshurst since 2011. Meanwhile, the Broadacres and Rascals Farm developments began construction in Southwater - Whilst Broadacres was at one point planned to be host to as many as 1,500 new homes, to date there have been 594, with some further ones planned. The 62-home Rascals Farm is currently under construction.
- Bishop's Cleeve, Gloucestershire. The village has experienced rapid growth since the 2010s, in part attributable to tech companies having a preference for its recently opened Grange Park office space, and GE Aerospace also basing themselves here. In line with demand, several substantial housing developments such as Fairmont have been established. Between 2011 and 2021, its population grew by around 4,000, with reports that interest in building around the area has by no means stopped since.
- Botley, Hampshire. The Boorley Park, Boorley Gardens and Sherecroft Meadows developments in the village, commencing from the 2010s, are in the process of expanding the area by around 1,100 new homes.
- Broughton Astley, Leicestershire. According to reports published by its own parish council, Broughton Astley has been undergoing planned expansion since the late 1960s. As of the 2021 UK census, its population stood at a relatively high 9,649.
- Bursledon, Hampshire. The Pillands Wood development was completed by 2000, expanding the village by 624 homes. More recently, between the Monarchs Keep development and projects by Taylor Wimpey, Foreman Homes, around 452 further homes have been built here.
- Calverton, Nottinghamshire. Calverton has already hosted a relatively large population since the 1930s, a souvenir of its designation as a pit village attracting workers. This has, in turn, led to discussion about its similarities to a town, and the need for amenities typically found in a town. Since the 2010s, more targeted expansion has taken place through the construction of housing. It was first selected as a "key settlement" by Gedling Council in 2014, and of several villages chosen, it was allocated a much larger amount of 753 potential new homes to be built. By the 2020s, the Forest View development predominantly put these plans into motion, introducing nearly 780 newbuilds. Further developments have been announced in 2025.
- Chinnor, Oxfordshire. In 2023, South Oxfordshire District Council reported that the village had been expanded by 866 new homes from 2011 onwards. A development under construction, Greenwood Place, is set to add a further 116.
- Cranleigh, Surrey. In 2019, it was identified that 1,700 new homes had been built in the village since 2013, in itself actually a lot lower than a target of 7,640 newbuild homes to at least receive planning permission. Following this, developments Cranleigh Grange, Knowle Park, Amber Waterside and Leighwood Fields have added around 840 more in housing stock during the 2020s, with even more newbuilds than this still being discussed for the future.
- Crowthorne, Berkshire. Close to the new settlement of Arborfield Green, the Buckler's Park development in Crowthorne is intended to bring 1,000 new homes to this village. Its development is currently being delivered in phases.
- East Leake, Nottinghamshire. In 2018, it was reported that over 400 homes had been built in the village. By another report, by 2019, 20% of 3,538 built in total in Rushcliffe borough (707 homes), were completed in East Leake. The 2020s has seen four further waves of newbuild homes begin development, Lantern Fields, The Skylarks, The Willows and Kestrel Fields, between them planned to total around 600 further homes.
- Edwinstowe, Nottinghamshire. The Thoresby Vale development is currently underway, by its conclusion intended to create 800 new homes.
- Ellistown and Battleflat, Leicestershire. Since the 2000s, a demand for housing around the village increased following the nearby Bardon industrial estate being built, which currently falls under the Ellistown and Battleflat civil parish. More recently, a designated parcel of land known as "South East Coalville", straddling both Ellistown and Hugglescote, has been chosen for potential newbuild developments. So far, Ellistown's Swinfen Vale development is underway within the parcel, with around 185 homes completed there recently by Ashberry Homes, and other 357 and 300-home additions to Swinfen Vale proposed. There's a possibility that developments in the South East Coalville area would eventually make Ellistown contiguous with Hugglescote, which in turn is contiguous with the town of Coalville, but this depends on how many of the considered 2,700 newbuilds for South East Coalville are actually constructed.
- Elsenham, Essex. There are currently plans in place to build up to 1,200 new homes in the village. The newbuild developments Elsenham Brook, 350-home Elsenham Park and Lavender Grove have already emerged during the 2020s. Elsenham was one of the proposed locations for Gordon Brown's eco-towns, announced in the late 2000s, before that particular project was abandoned.
- Fair Oak and Horton Heath, Hampshire. Expansion projects around these two adjoined villages, such as The Drove, date back to the 1980s. Most recently, however, the One Horton Heath development has begun construction to its south, with 2,500 homes ultimately planned to be built there by its completion.
- Haddenham, Buckinghamshire. This village initially saw a population boom during the 1970s, as several new housing estates were built. It has since been targeted for a planned population boost again, even being described as a "sustainable strategic settlement" within the London commuter belt, and acknowledged as a core location within the Oxford-Cambridge Arc. Aylesbury Vale District Council have stated plans outright for 50% population growth, and over 1,000 new homes in Haddenham, in the near future. As of December 2021, two of the sites where these homes are intended to be (one on Tibbs Road being Aspen Park) were described as "well underway" by the parish council. The 2020s Aspen Park development is on track to bring 233 of these new homes to the village.
- Heath Hayes and Wimblebury, Staffordshire. By the 1950s, Wimblebury was struggling with population decline after its primary industry, coal mining, came to a halt. A 1958 newspaper piece on the village went so far to describe it as a "ghost town" with "houses standing frozen, with gaping cracks in walls and ceilings". In response, regeneration followed with a wave of new housing developments during the 1980s, and in time Wimblebury became contiguous as well as linked administratively with its neighbour, the historically separate Heath Hayes. As of 2021, the parish comprising both places had a population of 13,412. A further 450-home project proposed by Taylor Wimpey, "a new residential development to be built on land east of Wimblebury Road", is pushing to be approved for development as of 2025.
- Hersden, Kent. The newbuild developments The Hoplands and The Woodlands have significantly expanded this village as part of wider targeted development planned, with around 500 new homes being built between these particular projects so far. Ultimately, it's planned for the village to receive 800 newbuild homes.
- Hethersett, Norfolk. The recent Ketts Meadow development is set to deliver 1,200 homes in total.
- Hook, Hampshire. From the 1980s and onwards, large housing estates were built which have since transformed this once small village consisting of a few roads, into what stood at a population of 9,062 as of 2021. Its expansion has additionally overlapped into the site of a long-abandoned medieval village, Murrell Green, which now constitutes a suburb of Hook. Newbuild homes have been brought to the village in the 2020s with ongoing developments, such as the 250-home Oakwood Grange.
- Keyworth, Nottinghamshire. Keyworth has a history of being a settlement distinctly chosen for newbuild housing in Nottinghamshire following World War II, resulting in its population being fairly large already by the 1970s. However, a recent, more substantial acceleration in new developments has taken place since the 2010s. It was quoted in a 2018 committee report by Keyworth and Wolds electoral ward that 600 new homes had recently been built there. Since then, the Keyworth Rise and Nicker Hill developments have led to around 250 further homes.
- Lee-on-the-Solent, Hampshire. The 1,050 home Cherque Farm development was completed in 2008.
- Mosley Common, Greater Manchester. Currently due to receive one of the largest portions of newbuild homes in north west England. Between four new developments known as Garrett Hall, Garrett Hall Fields, Trilogy, and a fourth under construction being managed by Peel Land ("land North of Mosley Common"), there's an expectation to deliver on around 1,800 new homes to the area.
- Polesworth and Dordon, Warwickshire. In a 2022 neighbourhood plan document published by Polesworth parish council, it was acknowledged that larger scale housing developments had begun in the area with 500 homes built in Polesworth "in the last three years". It continued on to announce plans for further developments, the largest being a desired 2,000 new homes in Polesworth's immediate neighbour, Dordon.
- "Potential New Settlement locations" Bidford-on-Avon, Bishop's Tachbrook and Wellesbourne, Warwickshire. In 2025, Warwickshire County Council outlined twelve "potential New Settlement locations", considered for newbuild housing and expansion. In addition to shortlisting Long Marston garden village, several other villages that had already been targeted for newbuild housing in the county between the 1980s and 2010s were nominated. Most notably, the May 2021 "Bishop's Tachbrook Neighbourhood Development Plan" documented that 2,720 new homes in the village had either been constructed recently, or were under development. An increase of around 4,000 new people in the village between the 2011 and 2021 UK censuses reflects the impact of this. A similar neighbourhood plan document for Bidford-on-Avon, meanwhile, acknowledged the development of 770 newbuild homes there already during the first half of the 2010s. Wellesbourne began to support a larger population from the 1980s onwards, following the completion of the 800-home Dovehouse estate there.
- Rackheath, Norfolk. Taylor Wimpey have announced long term plans to build 3,850 new homes in the village, with a short term target to reach 495 by 2028. Prince's Park and Trinity Meadows are ongoing, 2020s developments in the village of notable size. Rackheath was one of the proposed locations for Gordon Brown's eco-towns, announced in the late 2000s, before that particular project was abandoned.
- Rossington, South Yorkshire. Two large scale newbuild developments are underway in the village, which have at least begun construction. Pheasant Hill Park is envisioned to deliver 1,400 homes by 2028, with homes incrementally being built at present. The 1,200 home Torne Farm was completed by 2024. Around 180 homes were additionally built during the 2010s at a development known as Holly Hill II. At the 2021 UK census, Rossington had a population of 13,911. If all these developments are fully completed, it's quite possible that it could become the largest village in England by population. Rossington was one of the proposed locations for Gordon Brown's eco-towns, announced in the late 2000s, before that particular project was abandoned.
- Shevington, Greater Manchester. In the 1970s, private housing development in each corner of the village was requested by Wigan Metropolitan Borough Council, resulting in a threefold population increase.
- Sileby and Barrow upon Soar, Leicestershire. Since the 2010s, three waves of newbuild housing have led to 900 new homes in total being built in Sileby, with further 228-home and 195-home developments soon to be underway as of 2024. In neighbouring Barrow upon Soar, a high level of development has also occurred. 470 homes were reported to have planning permission or have been built by the parish council in 2017, whilst the recently established "New Homes For Barrow" website by Bloor Homes has outlined a plan for 703 new homes to be built in the village "across several sites". Developments known to outright be underway in the 2020s include Poppyfields, consisting of around 290 homes, and another consisting of 265 homes. Due to its size, Barrow upon Soar has been described as "a service centre due to the range of existing facilities and amenities within the village" by Charnwood Borough Council.
- Stansted Mountfitchet, Essex. In May 2007, Uttlesford District Council first discussed the growth of Stansted Mountfitchet, noting that a development called Forest Hall Park would soon mean the population would "rise significantly". News of Forest Hall Park being a completed, 300-home development surfaced by 2010, and by the time of the 2021 UK Census, the population had indeed risen from around 5,500, close to 8,000. The parish council have announced the intention to build 390 further homes in the village (some of these, at a development named Walpole Meadows, have been completed as of 2025, but it's now proposed to be expanded further), and a 1,000 home development is also undergoing planning.
- Stewartby and Kempston Hardwick, Bedfordshire. In addition to the Universal United Kingdom theme park undergoing construction in the area, developments of 3,800 and 1,000 homes respectively (along with "community facilities" being built at the site of the latter) have been proposed. The two villages are currently linked administratively, separate geographically, but these housing developments are proposed to make them one contiguous settlement in the long term.
- Witham St Hughs, Lincolnshire. A significant number of newbuild developments have undergone construction here in the 2020s. Between them, Roman Quarter, Swan Grange, Nova, The Meadows, Lancaster Grove and Merlin's Point will add around 800 new homes to the village by completion. It's been proposed, however, that 1,100 newbuilds total will be delivered in Witham St Hughs eventually, described by North Kesteven Council as a "sustainable urban extension".

Villages where large scale housing developments have been announced with plans to begin construction in the latter half of the 2020s, include Catshill, Four Marks, Marston Moreteyne, Penkridge, Tangmere and Wainscott.

Poundbury is an experimental new town or urban extension on the outskirts of Dorchester. The development is built on land owned by the Duchy of Cornwall. It is built according to the principles of (then) Prince Charles, who was known for holding strong views challenging the post-war trends in town planning that were suburban in character. The Duchy of Cornwall has since been responsible for coordinating the development of similar extensions in Newquay, Cornwall (Nansledan), and the upcoming South East Faversham, adjacent to the M2 in Kent, which was expected to undergo the planning process in 2023.

Euxton has grown significantly following the Buckshaw Village development, described as "one of the largest brownfield schemes of its kind throughout Europe", and conceptualised as an eco-village. Further expansion is planned with another development, Euxton Heights. Although Euxton falls under what were the designated boundaries of Central Lancashire New Town, the decision to proceed with these developments is unrelated.

On 13 May 2007, chancellor Gordon Brown, who became Prime Minister of the United Kingdom the following month, announced he would designate 10 new "eco-towns" to ease demand for low-cost housing. The towns, around 20,000 population each—at least 5,000 homes— were planned to be "carbon neutral" and use locally generated sustainable-energy sources. Only one site was first identified in the announcement: the former Oakington Barracks in Cambridgeshire, which was the site of what is now Northstowe. Later, several more locations were named. A site near St Austell, Cornwall, first known as China Clay Community, later became the West Carclaze settlement. A proposed eco-town to be named Middle Quinton at the site of Long Marston village, Warwickshire eventually inspired that village's expansion without any name change. As of 2009, it was reported that the other sites Brown had had in mind were "not going to happen". However, the garden villages announced in 2017 have been similar in ethos in that they placed emphasis on building eco-friendly settlements, and both West Carclaze and Long Marston were in fact included in the 2017 garden village list. The nominated villages Rackheath in Norfolk, Elsenham in Essex and Rossington in South Yorkshire, whilst they did not eventually become eco-towns as anticipated, continued to be targeted as major sites for newbuild homes over the following decades. Rackheath has been described as "the secret suburb" due to its large rate of growth. Neighbouring settlements Whitehill and Bordon in Hampshire, originally nominated as a site for one of these eco-towns, are still undergoing developments to eventually be merged into a "sustainable green town".

In September 2014, the CBI called for all political parties to commit to building 10 new towns and garden cities to get to grips with the country's housing shortage.

In addition to the garden villages, the January 2017 announcement outlined that some existing towns could receive newbuild homes, so much as doubling them in size in some cases, after acquiring "garden town" status. Didcot, Oxfordshire has been one of the first to be awarded garden town status in 2015. Amongst the towns expected to see the most dynamic population growth after developments are Didcot, Harlow and Gilston as part of a joint garden town project, Taunton and Cullompton.

In 2024, a "New Towns Taskforce" was formed by the Labour government, with the intended goal of finding suitable locations for future new towns. By February 2025, the Taskforce published an update which stated, "Our national call for evidence, which we conducted to aid location identification, invited submissions for sites with the potential for at least 10,000 homes and received over 100 responses. London, the south east, south west, and east of England received the largest number of submissions, but multiple proposals were received from every region of England. The majority of the sites submitted were urban extensions to existing towns or cities, with a smaller number of proposals for new standalone settlements."

== Finance ==
The financial model was for many years as follows: an area of countryside was designated as a new town under the act; land was bought from the owners at agricultural prices; the government borrowed to invest in housing, commercial premises, and supporting infrastructure such as sewers, schools, churches or open spaces; and in due course it sold off the commercial premises and part of the housing at developed prices, thus paying off the debt. This model ran into some difficulty in the 1970s as growing inflation increased the cost of new borrowing, and this complicated the impact of the programme on public finances. The corporations were in due course dissolved and their assets split between local authorities and, in England, the Commission for New Towns (later English Partnerships).

== Legacy ==
In July 2002, the Select Committee on Transport, Local Government and the Regions assessed the effectiveness of the new towns and concluded that:

While many New Towns have been economically successful, most now are experiencing major problems. Their design is inappropriate to the 21st Century. Their infrastructure is ageing at the same rate and many have social and economic problems. Many are small local authorities which do not have the capacity to resolve their problems. Their attempts to manage the towns are complicated by the role played by English Partnerships which still has major landholdings and other outstanding interests.

and:

The new towns are no longer new and many of the quickly built houses have reached the end of their design life. The masterplans dictated low density development with large amounts of open space, and housing segregated from jobs, shopping and business services. These created a car dependency and are now not considered sustainable. Low density developments are expensive to maintain. Roads and sewers are in need of expensive upgrades.

The lack of social ties experienced by some residents of the new towns has given rise to the notion of "new town blues".

== See also ==
- New towns movement
- London overspill
- Town and Country Planning Association

Elsewhere:

- List of planned cities
- New towns of Hong Kong
- New towns of Singapore
