= Murders of John Greenwood and Gary Miller =

1980 notable unsolved murder case

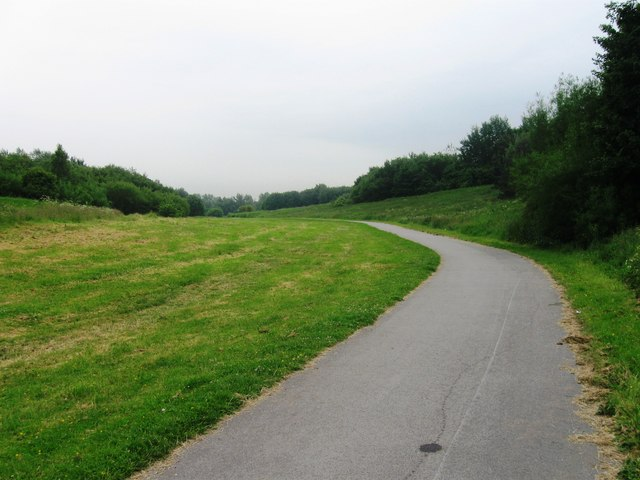
- Top: Miller (left) and Greenwood (right) shortly before they were murdered Bottom: What is now Stadt Moers Park, where the murders occurred in 1980
- Date: Saturday 16 August 1980
- Time: About 7:20 pm
- Location: Local rubbish tip on the site of present-day Stadt Moers Park in Whiston, Merseyside, England; 53.41019°N 2.80889°W
- Cause: Head injuries from having heads bashed against the ground, additionally strangulation with a rope in the case of Greenwood

The murders of John Greenwood (1968 or 1969 – 16 August 1980) and Gary Miller (1968 or 1969 – 16 August 1980), also referred to as the Whiston murder or the Whiston boys' murder, are the unsolved child murders of two 11-year-old schoolfriends in Merseyside, England in 1980 which were said to have "shocked the nation". On Saturday 16 August 1980, the two boys were found beaten and hidden underneath a mattress on a rubbish tip in Whiston, on what is now Stadt Moers Park. They had received serious head injuries from having their heads bashed against the ground, and although alive, later died in hospital. They had not been sexually assaulted, indicating that there was no sexual motive. The case has been described as "the community's worst crime in living memory".

A local man who confessed to the murders and revealed knowledge that apparently only the killer would know was acquitted at trial in 1981. However, the unsolved case has continued to receive publicity since, becoming the focus of a campaign by Merseyside Police – supported by the victims’ families – for reform of Britain's Middle Ages double jeopardy law so that previously acquitted suspects like the man in this case can be questioned again. This had followed a decision in 2019 by the Director of Public Prosecutions that new evidence found did not meet the high threshold for a double jeopardy prosecution of the original suspect. The acquitted man remains the prime suspect in the case, and has always been the only suspect, but police say that only being allowed to question the suspect could get the 'new' evidence needed to reopen the case.

== Murders ==
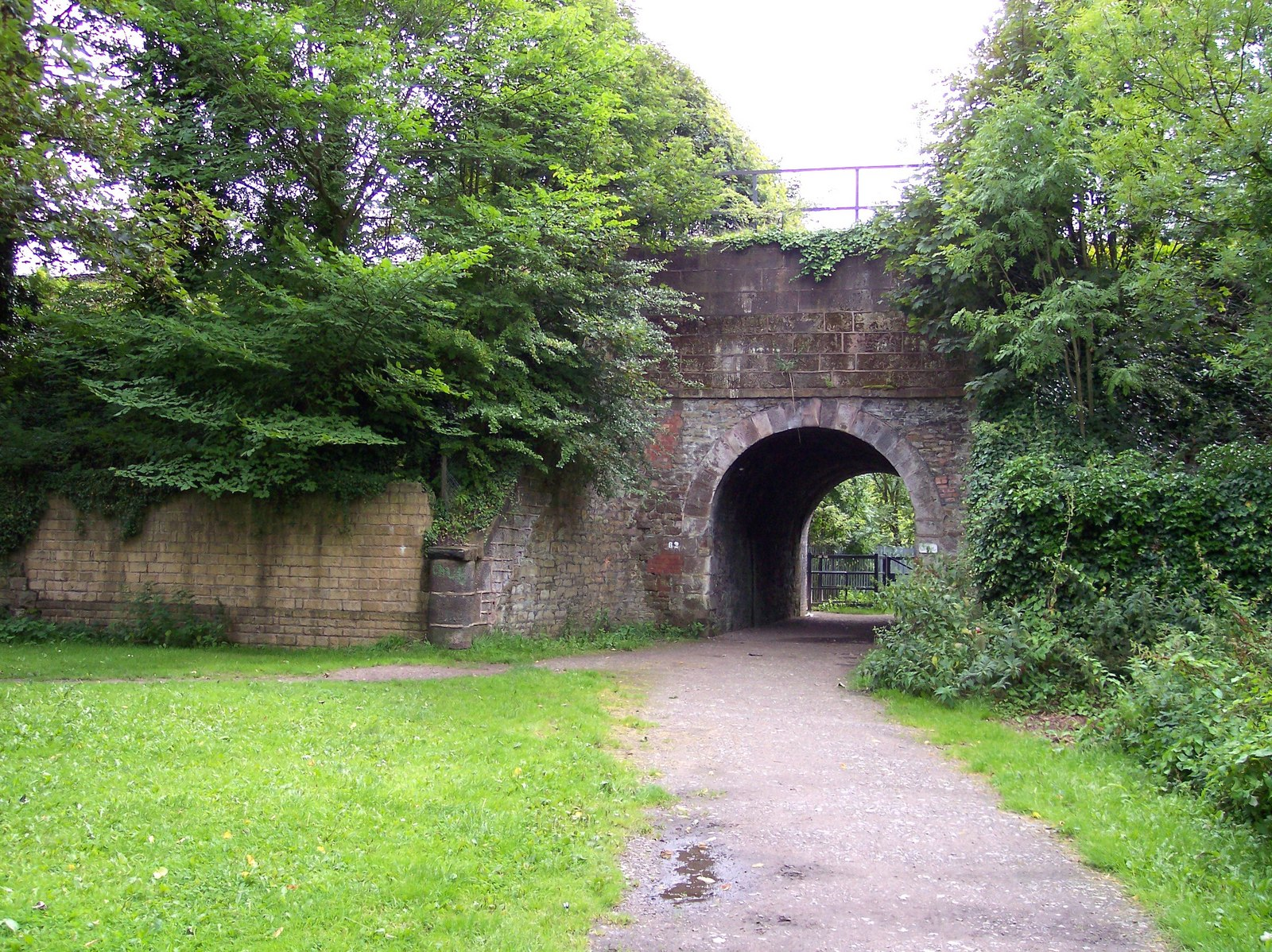
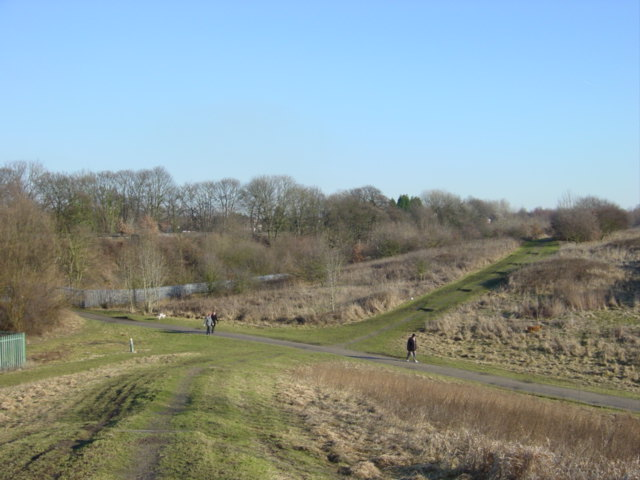
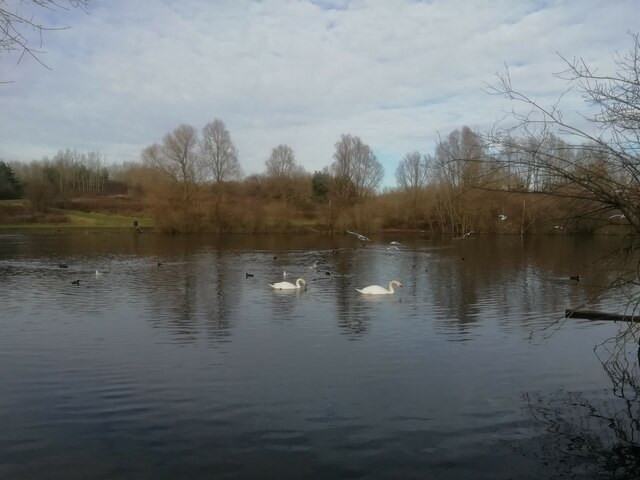
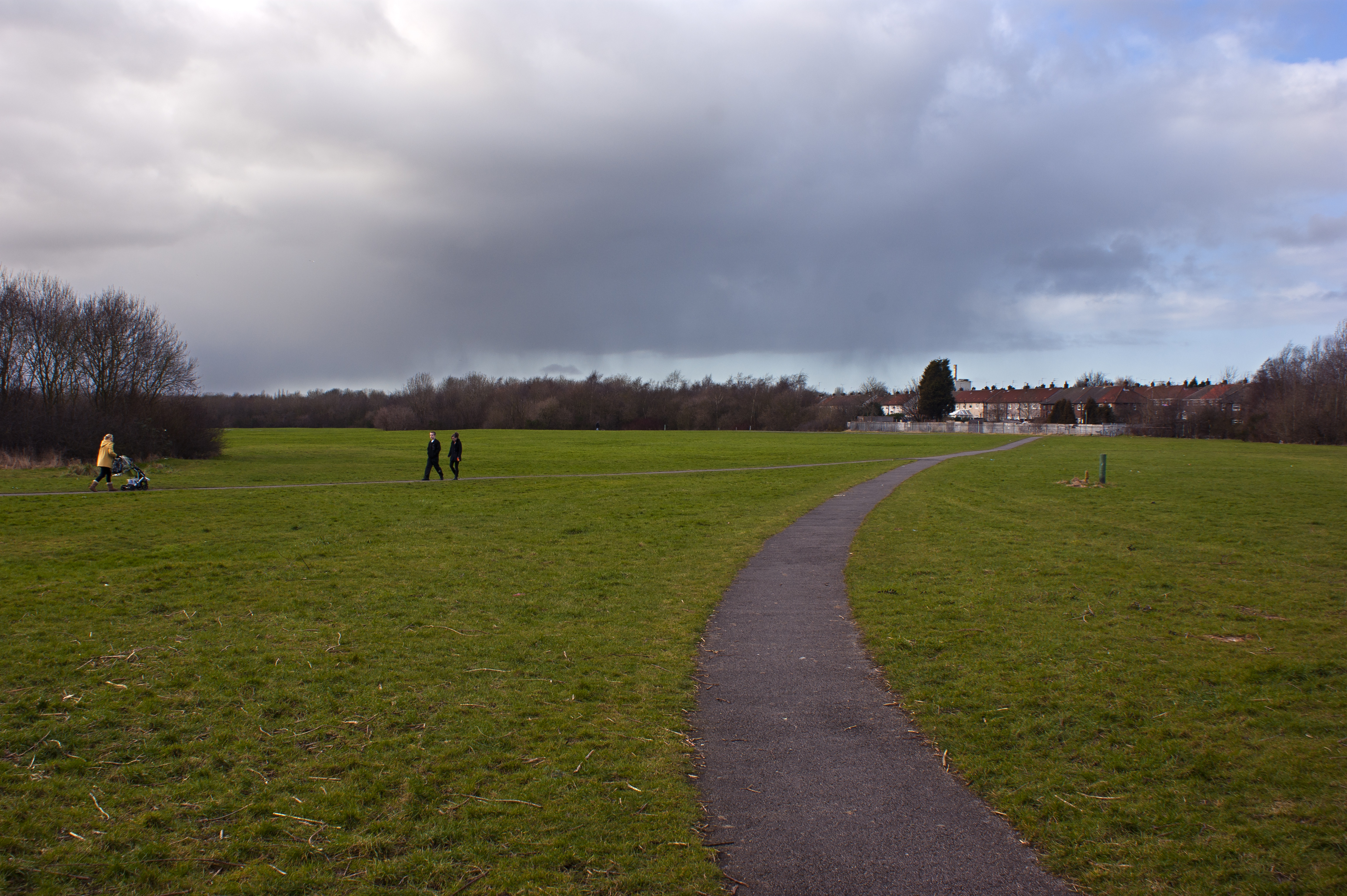
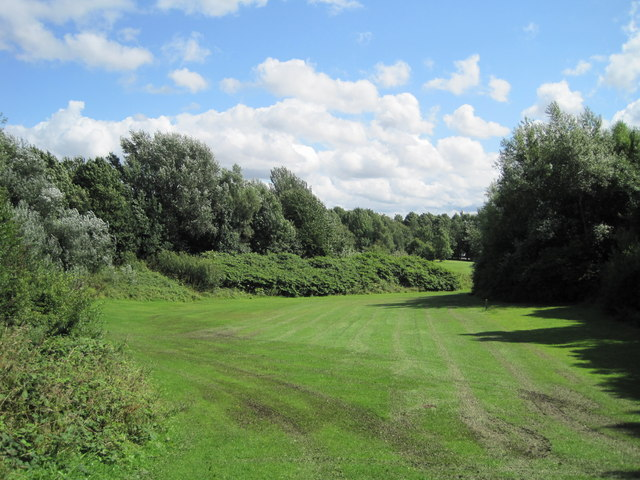
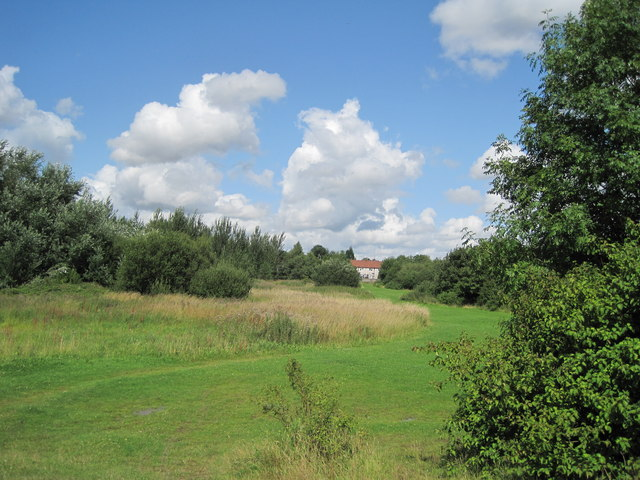
The rubbish tip where Greenwood and Miller were attacked and found is now Stadt Moers Park

At 7:20pm on Saturday 16 August 1980, a local dog walker found the two boys, who were schoolfriends, badly beaten and having been hidden under a mattress at a local rubbish tip off Pottery Lane. At that time the site was a disused colliery and is now Stadt Moers Park. They were both rushed to Whiston Hospital but died of what was later discovered to be head injuries. There was no evidence of any sexual assault, indicating the murders were not sexually motivated.

The boys had been seen alive only fifteen minutes before they were found, with another youth having seen them walking towards the rubbish tip. They were discovered by the dog walker after he had seen a man crouching down "banging something", and when he saw this man walk away the witness went over to the spot to hear a boy moaning underneath the mattress and discovered Greenwood and Miller, heavily injured. The pathologist found that one of the boys had been strangled with a rope, and that both had had their heads bashed against the ground.

The case was reportedly the "community's worst crime in living memory".

== Acquittal of suspect ==
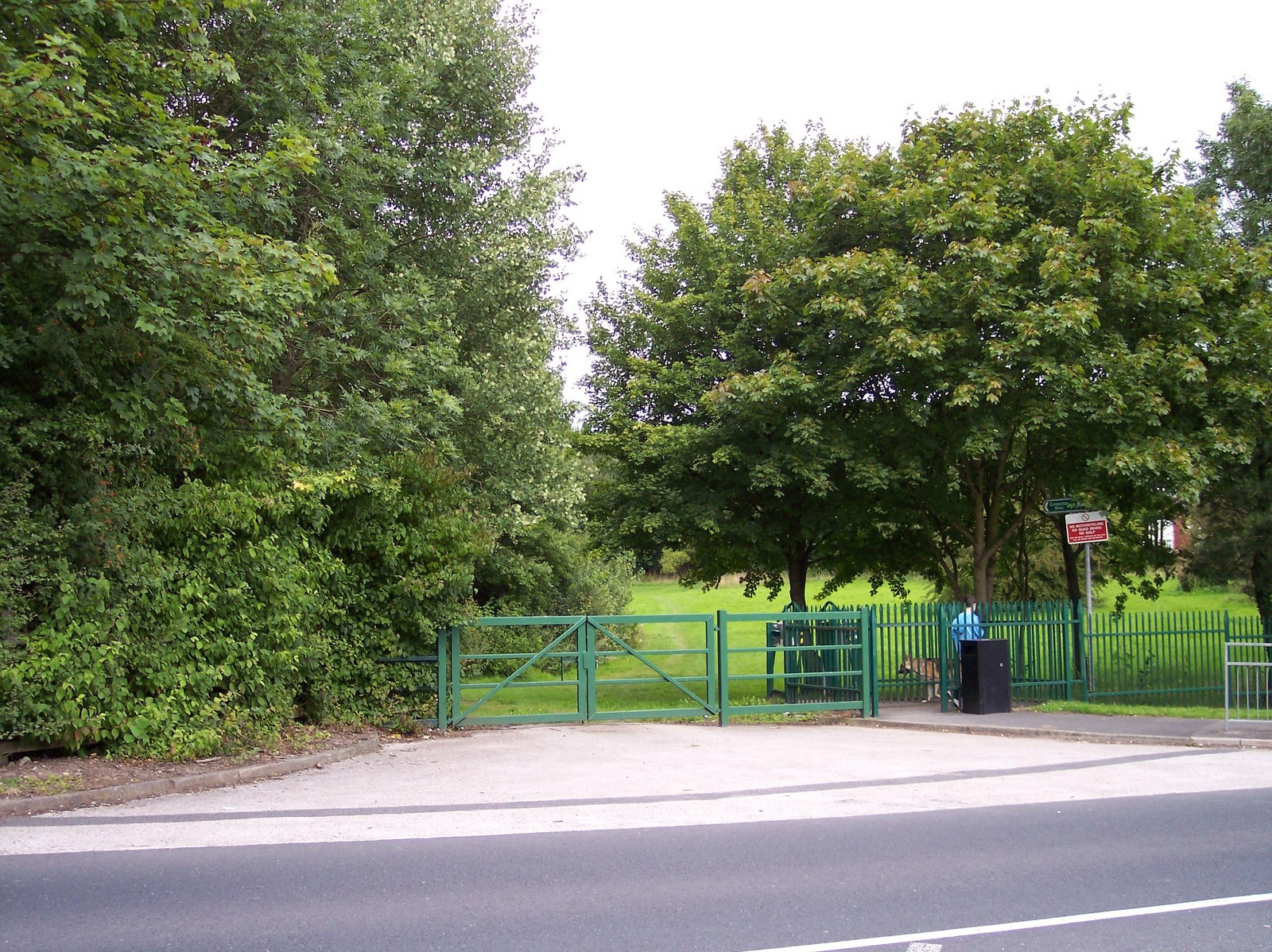
An entrance to Stadt Moers Park from Pottery Lane

Investigators quickly suspected a 20-year-old man named John Cheeseman, who was often seen wandering around the village of Whiston alone and who was described by locals as invariably dressed in baggy jeans and a brown jacket that was several sizes too big for him. He had a scruffy appearance, with long, straggly hair which locals reported always appeared uncombed, and locals commented on his slightly dirty, unshaven appearance and dark moustache. This appeared to match the description given by the dog walker who had been the witness to the murders, who had described the crouched man as being a "scrappy" man in a brown jacket. Cheeseman was known to play cards on the street with young boys, and helped out each week at the local Scout hut. The attacks on the boys had occurred on the man's birthday, 16 August.

Cheeseman immediately aroused suspicion when being questioned by police the day after the murders by stating a number of things that investigators found to be completely false. At first he claimed to have an alibi for the murder as he said he was at a friend's house all evening, but the family of the friend revealed that this was untrue. As soon as interviewers put this to Cheeseman and revealed that the friend in question was not at home that night, Cheeseman changed his story, saying "Oh, I remember now, his mum came to the door and said he’d gone to his nan’s". However, this also was known to be impossible as the mother had also been out that night, and when this was told to Cheeseman he again changed his account, saying: "Oh yes, I knocked at his door but nobody answered, so I went". At this point Cheeseman then revealed that he had met two boys (believed to be Greenwood and Miller) but became angry with them as they smashed some bottles and one "gave me the f-word". He said that he'd pushed them onto the ground and, unexpectedly and unprompted, said "there wasn't a mattress". Even though the interviewers reminded him that he did not have to speak if he did not want to and that the evidence could be used in court, he then openly admitted there was a mattress and that he had hit the boys and thrown them onto the mattress. He went on to say that then he "saw a bloke coming" and so he walked away. Some hours later, Cheeseman's father came to accompany his son being interviewed and willingly observed as Cheeseman signed a confession statement, formally admitting to the murders. The statement said:

"There was only me, John and his mate there and they started to call me names … They started swearing at me. I then started to hit them. They carried on calling me the f-word and calling me names. So I started to hit them again. Then I thought one of them was dead, he wasn’t breathing. Then I listened to his heart, then I got a piece of rope and put it around his neck. I thought the other one was dead, he wasn’t breathing. He was unconscious. The rope I had put around one of the lad's neck, I threw away near the railings. John's mate said I was knocking a married woman off. When I hit them they fell on a mattress. When it was all over I left the mattress there, it was near them. When I left the boys I climbed over the railings and went through a tunnel and home. I hope the scoutmaster doesn't find out."

The confession was found to be particularly damning as no one had yet reported a rope had been used and this had not yet been revealed by the pathologist, meaning that Cheeseman had knowledge that only the killer would know. Furthermore, the police then went to search for the rope he said he had discarded by railings and indeed found it where he said he had thrown it, and the rope matched the marks on Greenwood's neck.

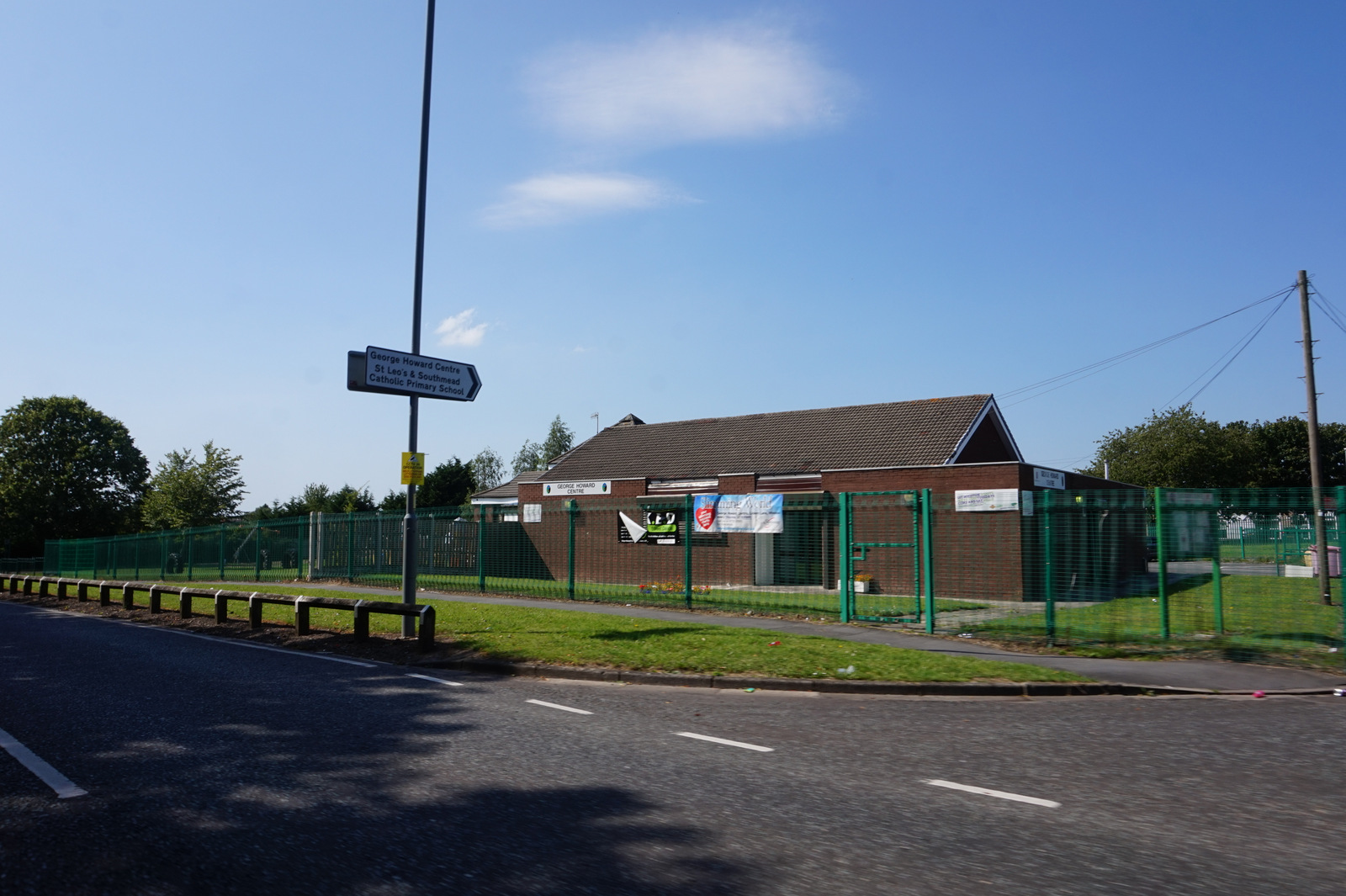
The suspect, John Cheeseman, knew both the victims from his time helping out with the local Scout group. Police continue to appeal for those who attended the 28th St Helens (1st Whiston) Scout Group (later known as the 2nd Knowsley Scout Group) in 1980 to come forward. The Scout group is based at the pictured George Howard Centre on Lickers Lane, Whiston

During the interviews, Cheeseman had replied to police asking him if he understood that Greenwood died as a result of his actions by saying "Yes, I'm sorry". His father was invited to be present in the interviews by police, who said at trial they wanted to be fair to the defendant, and Cheeseman told his father when he arrived that "it was me that done the two lads on the tip". The father apparently refused to believe it but Cheeseman got out of his chair, held his father's arm and said "no dad, no. I did do it".

At trial in 1981, however, the defence claimed Cheeseman had an alibi and pointed to how no witnesses apparently saw blood on him, although the judge highlighted that he had already given the police a false alibi and had the knowledge of the rope that only the killer would know. The defence also concentrated on police failings in the case. The jury then found Cheeseman not guilty after only 45 minutes deliberation.

In 2016, a Sunday Times investigation found that a witness had actually reported seeing "what looked to be red paint" on Cheeseman's clothes when he came to see her that evening. Police would also later apologise for their 'blunders' in the initial investigation.

== Aftermath ==
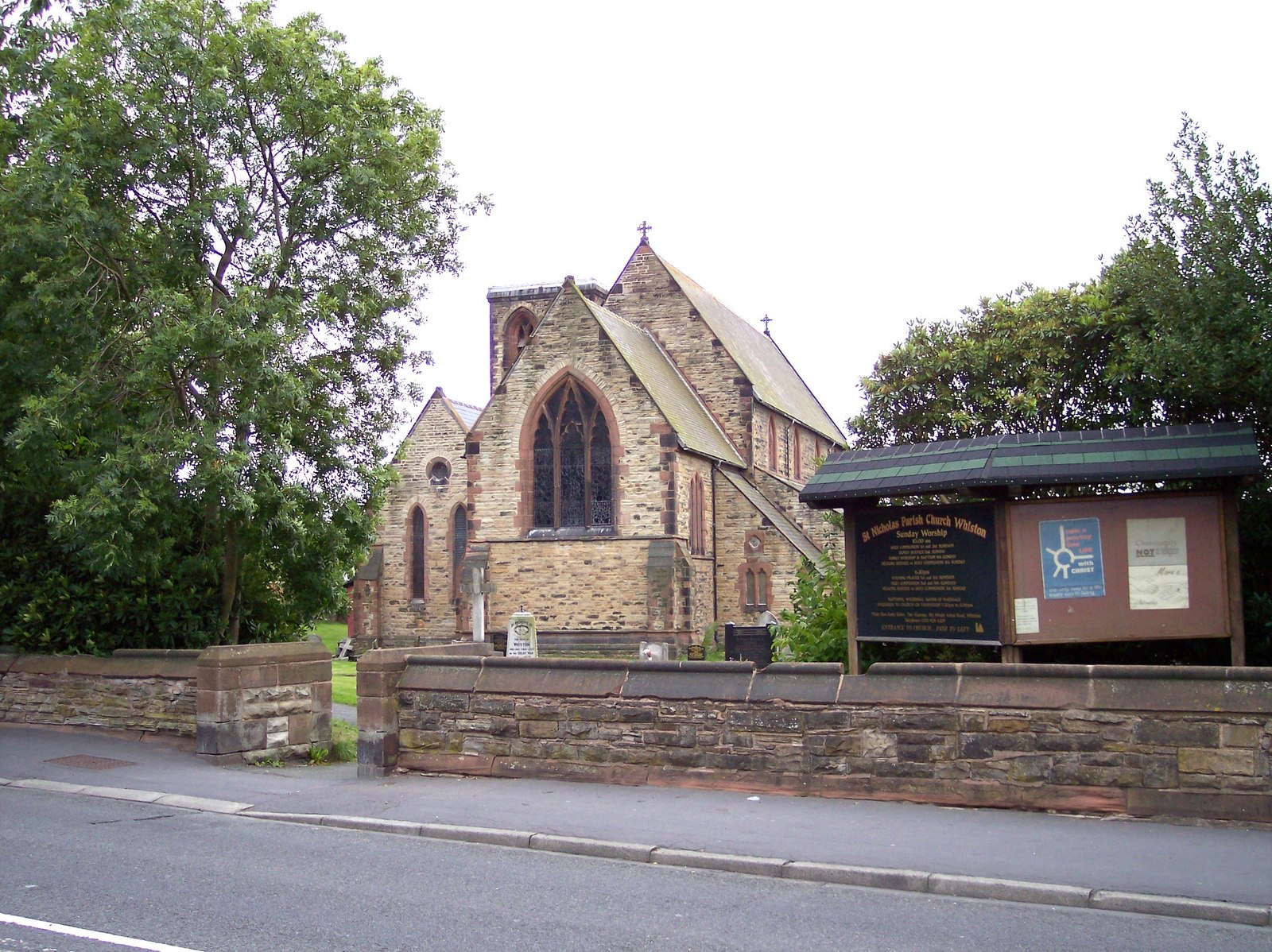
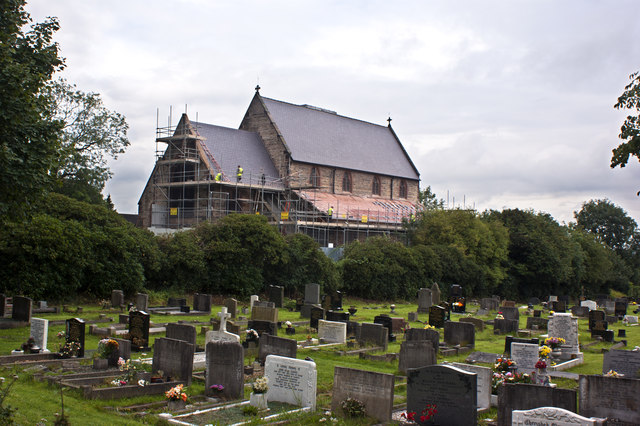
Greenwood and Miller are both buried at the local St Nicholas Church, Whiston

The police revealed that they still thought Cheeseman was responsible and that they weren't looking for anybody else.

In 1993 the case returned to the news at the time of the nearby James Bulger case, with the parents of Greenwood and Miller, fellow parents of child murder victims in the area, offering their condolences to Bulger's parents.

There was renewed interest in the case in 2003 after the law on 'double jeopardy' was changed with the Criminal Justice Act 2003, allowing re-trials of suspects previously acquitted if 'new and compelling' evidence emerged. The families of the victims, therefore, asked for a reinvestigation, but it was only 2008 before Merseyside Police looked at the case again, even though regulations stated that cold case reviews should be undertaken every two years. The 2008 review duly found that much of the evidence in the case had been lost or destroyed in the years since.

== Continuing publicity and campaign ==
In September 2016 there was renewed publicity for the case when an investigation by The Sunday Times led to the unearthing of new evidence, resulting in Merseyside Police re-opening the investigation. It emerged that a number of families had become disturbed at the time by 20-year-old Cheeseman hanging around with the young boys he knew from helping with the Scouts, and Greenwood's own father had intervened and asked the father of Cheeseman to stop him hanging around with his son. This had upset Cheeseman and a local man recounted how he came crying to his door about it only three days before Greenwood and Miller were killed, with Cheeseman saying he would 'get the family back' and 'make sure something would happen'. However, because of the laws that existed at the time (before the Criminal Justice Act 2003), this evidence was not admissible in court in 1981 as it was deemed hearsay.

It also emerged that two boys had been with Greenwood and Miller on the afternoon of the murder, goading and insulting Cheeseman until he "snapped" and began chasing them around the estate. The two boys said that they had all been bullying Cheeseman for weeks beforehand. Furthermore, the investigation by The Sunday Times found that a woman had recounted seeing Cheeseman with "what looked like red paint" on his trousers that evening. The Sunday Times went to interview Cheeseman, still alive in 2016 and still living in Whiston, and found that some of his family members suspected him of involvement, with his older brother disowning him and his two nieces not allowing him to see their children.

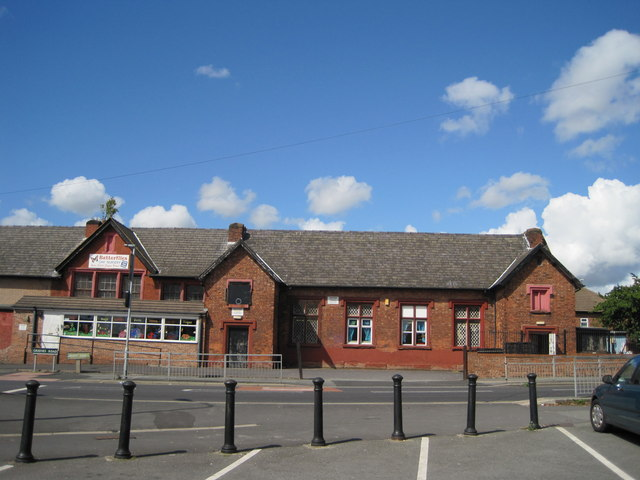
Police have appealed for information from three young boys aged 12-14 seen between 6:45 and 7:20pm on the evening of the murder with a man by the local church hall on Dragon Lane (now a nursery). Police have also appealed for anyone who saw the man to come forward, and also for information on a boy aged between 10 and 15 at the time named "Duffy" or "Cuffy" seen to the rear of the Labour Club only yards away

In 2016, with Cheeseman still the only suspect, Merseyside Police said that they had new evidence but needed more, commenting "we need more information to take this investigation forward". In 2017, police revealed there were "new leads" in the case. One of the witness sightings that investigators believed to be important was of a man with three young boys between the ages of 12 and 14 near to the local church hall on Dragon Lane, at around the time or just before the boys died, between 6:45 and 7:20pm. Two of the boys were standing on the wall of the church hall, while the other was in the grounds. Merseyside Police continue to appeal for the boys, or anyone who saw the man, to come forward. Two other boys (who would now be men) that police have been unable to trace were a boy aged around 10 and a boy aged around 15 who were seen being assaulted by an adult male outside Whiston Health Centre some weeks before the murders. A man who would then have been a boy between 10 and 15 named "Duffy" or "Cuffy" is also requested to come forward by Merseyside Police, as he had been seen with another boy at the rear of the Labour club in Whiston on the day of the murders. In 2017, police appealed for those who were fellow pupils of the victims at Halsnead Junior School and anyone who attended the 28th St Helens (1st Whiston) Scout Group (latterly known as the 2nd Knowsley Scout Group) in 1980 to come forward.

=== 'Double jeopardy' question ===
"This crazy, crazy 800-year-old Medieval law means they're not allowed to question him, even as a witness. So we're not saying 'this person's guilty, drag him back to court', all we are asking is that the police are allowed to do their jobs. If they feel they need to speak to someone in a double-trial murder case, they should be allowed to speak to them."

— Sister of victim John Greenwood Debbie Lewis, speaking on ITV News, 2020

In 2019, Merseyside Police sent a file with the new evidence they had found to the Director of Public Prosecutions, hoping to be granted permission to re-charge Cheeseman under the 2003 double jeopardy laws, but this was turned down on the grounds that there was insufficient new and compelling evidence to meet the threshold. Merseyside Police stated that they had been told by the DPP that it "acknowledges that this is a tragic case and has said that in the event that the ongoing police investigation yields sufficient compelling new evidence, he would reconsider his decision". At the same time, Merseyside Police apologised for failings in the original investigation, saying that "it is fair to say that the investigation was not as thorough as it could have been, or in line with the investigation standards expected of policing today".

Under the 2003 double jeopardy legislation, a previously acquitted suspect can only be interviewed again with a high threshold of new evidence and permission from the Director of Public Prosecutions. In 2019 police asked to be granted permission from the DPP to question Cheeseman again, but were not allowed. This led Merseyside Police, in a rare move, to call in 2020 for a change in the law so as to allow suspects like Cheeseman to be questioned again, with Assistant Chief Constable Ian Critchley saying:

"We know it has to be carefully considered. We know the re-investigation of someone who has been acquitted at court is really important and we must obviously take into account a court's decision. But when we have further information and evidence, where we feel, with good reason and good grounds, there is a case to interview somebody, which could support the fact that there may well now be further compelling evidence to be considered, we would very, very much welcome a consideration and a change to the existing legislation."

Merseyside Police said that only a change in the law that would allow them to re-question a suspect would allow them to get new evidence to reopen the Greenwood and Miller case, and that only a change in the law could allow them to re-interview Cheeseman. The force said that a change in the law would also enable them to potentially solve other cases, with Critchley explaining: "We believe being able to re-question suspects could potentially lead to being able to demonstrate the new and compelling evidence needed to reopen particular cases, including the murders of John Greenwood and Gary Miller".

The family of Greenwood and Miller supported Merseyside Police's campaign as reported nationally on ITV News in February 2020, with Greenwood's sister running a Facebook page on the case and starting an online petition to get the law changed, saying: "This law is in place to prevent possible harassment of a suspect, but we are going through real pain. Real pain. And there is no law in place to help us". She added: "There should always be systems in place to protect people from harassment but this [law] goes way too far in the other direction".

== In popular culture ==
On 27 January 1991, the parents of Greenwood and Miller appeared on the Granada TV programme Close to the Edge, which was on the subject of revenge.

The case and the associated double jeopardy campaign was featured on a broadcast of the national ITV News in February 2020.

The case featured on Crimewatch Live in September 2020.
