= St Edmund Arrowsmith Catholic High School =

St Edmund Arrowsmith Catholic High School is the name of two schools named after Edmund Arrowsmith:

- St Edmund Arrowsmith Catholic High School, Ashton-in-Makerfield
- St Edmund Arrowsmith Catholic Academy, Whiston (formerly St Edmund Arrowsmith Catholic High School)
