= Heyford =

Heyford may refer to:

== Places ==
- Heyford Park, a civil parish in Oxfordshire
- Lower Heyford, Oxfordshire, England
  - Heyford railway station, serving Lower Heyford
- Nether Heyford, Northamptonshire, England
- Upper Heyford, Northamptonshire, England
- Upper Heyford, Oxfordshire, England

== Other ==
- Handley Page Heyford, a bomber aircraft
