= Stadt Moers Park =

Park in Whiston, Merseyside, England

Stadt Moers
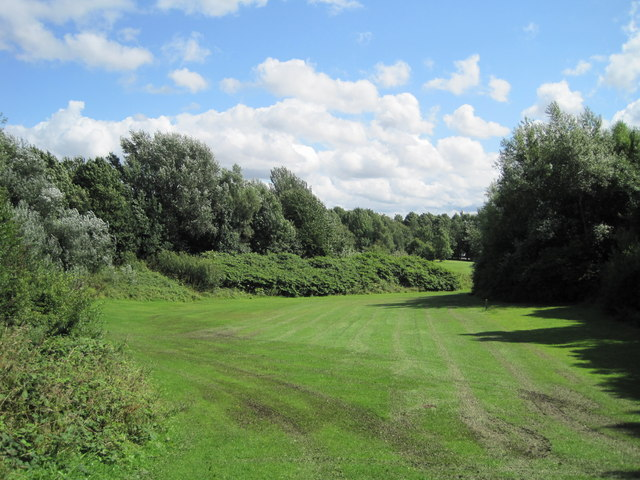
- Stadt Moers Park
- Interactive map of Stadt Moers
- Type: Public
- Location: Whiston, Merseyside
- Coordinates: 53.407895°N 2.813048°W
- Area: 220 acres (0.89 km^{2})
- Operator: Knowsley Metropolitan Borough Council
- Status: Open all year round
- Website: https://www.merseyforest.org.uk/things-to-do/walks-bike-rides-and-more/woodlands/stadt-moers-country-park/

Stadt Moers Park is a public park located in Whiston, Merseyside in the Metropolitan Borough of Knowsley. The park covers 220 acres (0.89 km^{2}) of land between Whiston and Huyton.

== History ==
Before the park was established, the area was used for coal mining until the 1890s. In 1898 the Whiston Metallic Brick Works were built (known locally as Tushingham's Brickworks). When the brickworks closed in the 1970s and the site became derelict in 1976, the park was used as a landfill site for domestic refuse. This landfill site was where the unsolved Murders of John Greenwood and Gary Miller were carried out

In 1983, Knowsley Metropolitan Borough Council began cleaning up the area and turned the site into a country park known today as Stadt Moers. The name Stadt Moers comes from Knowsley's twin town of Moers in Germany.

== Facilities ==
The Park has numerous entrances located around Whiston, with car park spaces available. The park is divided into 4 'quadrants', divided by the M57 Motorway: Tushington's Quadrant (named after the former Brickworks on the site), Pottery Fields Quadrant, West View Quadrant, and Pluckington's Quadrant.

The Green Space Ranger Service for Prescot, Whiston and Cronton are based at the environment centre here and run many public events throughout the year.

A 5 km free, weekly, timed parkrun is held at 9am every Saturday.
