= Listed buildings in Whiston, Merseyside =

Whiston is a civil parish in Knowsley, Merseyside, England. It contains ten buildings that are recorded in the National Heritage List for England as designated listed buildings, all of which are listed at Grade II. This grade is the lowest of the three gradings given to listed buildings and is applied to "buildings of national importance and special interest". The parish is partly residential, and partly rural. The listed buildings include farmhouses and farm buildings, houses, structure sat the entrance to a former country house, a church, a milestone, and a railway bridge.

Name and location	Photograph	Date	Notes
Paddocks and Stables; 53.40239°N 2.80668°W		1653	Originating as a barn and other farm buildings, these are in stone, with brick at the rear, and have slate roofs. The buildings form a long range, and were remodelled in 1819. There are various openings, including doorways, oculi and square-headed windows, and ventilation holes.
Carr House Farmhouse; 53.40230°N 2.80702°W		Before 1660	A sandstone farmhouse with a stone roof, built in two phases, and consisting of a main range and a cross-wing. It is in two storeys, and there is a datestone above a blocked doorway. The windows are mullioned.
Old Halsnead; 53.40017°N 2.79178°W	—	1680	A stuccoed stone house with a stone roof, in two storeys, with a four-bay front. In the third bay is a two-storey gabled porch. This has a round-arched entrance with a keystone and imposts, above which is a three-light windows and an armorial crest. The other bays all contain a five-light mullioned window on each floor.
Sandfield House; 53.40885°N 2.78894°W		18th century	A brick house with a stone roof, in two storeys, and with a symmetrical three-bay front. The central doorway has a fanlight, and a Tuscan porch with a cornice. Flanking the house are two-storey wings, each with a hipped roof. The windows are sashes.
Barn, Snape Gate; 53.40260°N 2.78667°W	—	18th century (probable)	The former barn is in stone, with irregular quoins on the corners, and it has a stone roof. On the road side is a cart entrance with a segmental head and a keystone. On the south side are two rows of ventilation slits.
Northeast Lodge, Halsnead Park; 53.40589°N 2.78513°W		Early 19th century	The lodge to a former country house, now demolished. It is in Georgian style, built in stone, and with a pyramidal slate roof. The lodge is in a single storey, it has rusticated quoins, and a central round-headed porch before a round-headed doorway. The windows are also round-headed and are mullioned.
Gatepiers, Lodge, Halsnead Park; 53.40602°N 2.78510°W		Early 19th century	There are four gate piers, all in rusticated stone, with a square plan and topped by a cornice and a ball finial. Two piers are beside the entrance to the drive, and these are flanked by curving walls, at the ends of which are the other piers by the roadside.
Milestone; 53.42343°N 2.78908°W		Early 19th century	The milestone is on the north side of Warrington Road (A57 road). It is in painted sandstone, and has a triangular section, a curved top, and at the bottom is a semicircular panel inscribed "WHISTON". On the sides are the distances in Roman numerals to Warrington, Prescot and Liverpool.
Roper's Bridge; 53.41361°N 2.79974°W		c. 1829	The bridge carries Dragon Lane over the former Liverpool and Manchester Railway at an angle. It was designed by George Stephenson, and is built in sandstone. It consists of a single segmental arch with voussoirs and projecting keystones and flanked by full-height pilaster strips. The parapet consists of sandstone blocks.
St Nicholas' Church; 53.40693°N 2.80298°W		1864–68	The church was designed by G. E. Street in Early English style, and is built in sandstone with slate roofs. It consists of a nave with a clerestory, aisles, a chancel with a north organ chamber and a south Lady chapel, and a west vestry. At the southeast corner, and almost detached, is a tower. The stained glass includes windows designed by William Morris and Edward Burne-Jones.
