= William Snowden =

English former cricketer

Personal information
- Full name: William Snowden
- Born: 27 September 1952 (age 74); Whiston, Lancashire, England
- Batting: Right-handed
- Bowling: Right-arm medium

Domestic team information
- Years: Team
- 1972–1975: Cambridge University

Career statistics
Competition	First-class	List A
Matches	37	10
Runs scored	1,413	112
Batting average	21.40	11.20
100s/50s	3/4	–/–
Top score	108*	44
Balls bowled	20	0
Wickets	0	–
Bowling average	–	–
5 wickets in innings	–	–
10 wickets in match	–	–
Best bowling	–	–
Catches/stumpings	10/–	4/–
- Source: Cricinfo, 6 September 2019

William Snowden (born 27 September 1952) is an English former cricketer.

Snowden was born in September 1952 at Whiston, Lancashire. He was educated at Merchant Taylors' School, Crosby, before going up to Emmanuel College, Cambridge. While studying at Cambridge, he made his debut in first-class cricket for Cambridge University against Leicestershire at Fenner's in 1972. He played first-class cricket for Cambridge until 1975, making 35 appearances. Playing as a batsman, he scored 1,315 runs in his 35 first-class matches for Cambridge, at an average of 21.20 and a high score of 108 not out. This score, one of three centuries he made, came against Kent in 1973. He also made two first-class appearances for the combined Oxford and Cambridge Universities cricket team, playing against the touring New Zealanders in 1973, and the touring Indians in 1974. In addition to playing first-class cricket while at Cambridge, he also made ten appearances in List A one-day cricket. The first eight of these came for Cambridge University, with four appearances apiece in the 1972 and 1974 Benson & Hedges Cup, with Snowden scoring 88 runs with a high score of 44. He also made two List A appearances for the Combined Universities cricket team in the 1975 Benson & Hedges Cup. After graduating from Cambridge he became a schoolteacher, teaching geography at Harrow School from 1981–2014.
