= David Leather =

English cricketer

Personal information
- Full name: David Leather
- Born: 25 November 1977 (age 48); Whiston, merseyside, England
- Batting: Right-handed
- Bowling: Right-arm fast-medium

Domestic team information
- Years: Team
- 1997–1999: Cheshire

Career statistics
Competition	First-class	List A
Matches	1	4
Runs scored	0	75
Batting average	0.00	37.50
100s/50s	–/–	–/–
Top score	0	42*
Balls bowled	60	156
Wickets	–	2
Bowling average	–	78.00
5 wickets in innings	–	–
10 wickets in match	–	–
Best bowling	–	1/38
Catches/stumpings	–/–	–/–
- Source: Cricinfo, 8 April 2011

David Leather (born 27 November 1977) is a former English cricketer. Brock was a right-handed batsman who bowled right-arm fast-medium. He was born in Whiston, Merseyside.

Leather made his debut for Cheshire in the 1997 Minor Counties Championship against Devon. Leather played Minor counties cricket for Cheshire from 1997 to 1999, including nine Minor Counties Championship matches.

In 1998, he made his List A debut for the British Universities cricket team against Somerset in the Benson and Hedges Cup. He played two further List A matches for the team in that competition, against Hampshire and Surrey. In that same season he made his only first-class appearance for the team, which came against the touring South Africans at Fenner's, Cambridge. In this match he batted once, being dismissed for a duck by Pat Symcox, while with the ball he bowled 10 wicket-less overs. He later made a single List A appearance, his last, for Cheshire against Kent in the 1999 NatWest Trophy. In total, Leather played four List A matches, scoring 75 runs at a batting average of 37.50, with a high score of 42*. With the ball he took 2 wickets at a bowling average of 78.00, with best figures of 1/38.

He also played Second XI cricket for the Lancashire Second XI in 1995 and the Sussex Second XI in 1998.
