= Great Haddon =

Proposed settlement in Peterborough, Cambridgeshire, England

Coordinates: 52.516°N 0.285°W

Great Haddon is a major settlement proposed in Peterborough, Cambridgeshire, England, near Yaxley. It was granted planning permission in 2015 after a lengthy application process, which included concerns over infrastructure provision.

The development will comprise 5,350 homes, a district shopping centre, three primary schools and one secondary school.

The nearby village of Yaxley was flooded in 2024. Peterborough City Council claimed that this was "due to the lack of maintenance of the watercourse", however the Yaxley Parish Council denied this claim and alleged that the flooding was the result of the housing development in Great Haddon, a location situated on land owned by Peterborough City Council.
