= Halsnead Garden Village =

Coordinates: 53.4056°N 2.7924°W

- Population: 0
- OS grid reference: SJ4790
- Metropolitan borough: Knowsley
- Metropolitan county: Merseyside
- Region: North West
- Country: England
- Sovereign state: United Kingdom
- Postcode district: L35
- Website: https://halsneadgardenvillage.co.uk/

Halsnead Garden Village is a proposed garden village close to the Halsnead Park area of Whiston in Knowsley, Merseyside, England. The UK Government announced the proposal in January 2017.

== Proposal ==
The plan for the village includes over 1500 homes, a country park, a new primary school, and a variety of community and leisure facilities. It is "one of the biggest residential developments on Merseyside", at a cost of £270M.

In February 2022 Knowsley Council granted permission for housebuilder Taylor Wimpey to start developing 40 acres at the site for a 350-home development, forming part of the south-eastern parcel of the land. Taylor Wimpey and other developers are working on plans for further homes in the area.

Knowsley Council also gave the green light for Bloor homes to build their development known as "Elowen Garden Village", situated on the opposite side of Halsnead Park.
