= St Edmund Arrowsmith Catholic Academy, Whiston =

St Edmund Arrowsmith Catholic Academy

Location
- Cumber Lane; Whiston, Merseyside, L35 2XG; England
- Coordinates: 53.416559°N 2.783549°W

Information
- Type: Academy
- Motto: Latin; Fortes in Fide; English; Strong in Faith
- Religious affiliation: Roman Catholic
- Local authority: Knowsley
- Department for Education URN: 148534 Tables
- Ofsted: Reports
- Principal: Clare McKenna (Acting Headteacher)
- Gender: Coeducational
- Age: 11 to 16
- Enrolment: 1,001
- Colour
- Website: http://www.stedmundarrowsmith.org.uk

St Edmund Arrowsmith Catholic Academy (formerly St Edmund Arrowsmith Catholic High School) is a coeducational Roman Catholic secondary school located in Whiston in the English county of Merseyside. The school is named after Saint Edmund Arrowsmith, one of the Forty Martyrs of England and Wales.

Formerly St Edmund Arrowsmith Catholic High School was located on Scotchbarn Lane. In 2010 the school relocated to a new building located on the site of the former Knowsley Higher Side Comprehensive School on Cumber Lane. The new-build was funded as part of the Building Schools for the Future programme, and the new school was named St Edmund Arrowsmith Catholic Centre for Learning. In 2018, the school was renamed back to St Edmund Arrowsmith Catholic High School.

St Edmund Arrowsmith Catholic High School was a voluntary aided school administered by Knowsley Metropolitan Borough Council. In 2019 the school was rated 'Inadequate' by OFSTED and was placed into special measures. In May 2021 the school converted to academy status and was renamed St Edmund Arrowsmith Catholic Academy. The school is now sponsored by the Pope Francis Multi Academy Trust. It continues to be a Catholic School under the jurisdiction of the Roman Catholic Archdiocese of Liverpool.
