= List of electoral wards in Nottinghamshire =

This is a list of electoral divisions and wards in the ceremonial county of Nottinghamshire in the East Midlands. All changes since the re-organisation of local government following the passing of the Local Government Act 1972 are shown. The number of councillors elected for each electoral division or ward is shown in brackets.

== County council ==
=== Nottinghamshire ===
Electoral Divisions from 1 April 1974 (first election 12 April 1973) to 7 May 1981:

1. Arnold (East) (1)
2. Arnold (South) (1)
3. Arnold (West) (1)
4. Balderton (1)
5. Basford No. 1 (Newthorpe) (1)
6. Basford No. 2 (1)
7. Basford No. 3 (1)
8. Basford No. 4 (1)
9. Basford No. 5 (1)
10. Basford No. 6 (2)
11. Beeston & Stapleford (Bramcote) (1)
12. Beeston & Stapleford (Chilwell) (1)
13. Beeston & Stapleford (North) (1)
14. Beeston & Stapleford (South) (1)
15. Beeston & Stapleford (Stapleford) (1)
16. Beeston & Stapleford (Totton & Atte (1)
17. Bingham No. 1 (1)
18. Bingham No. 2 (1)
19. Bingham No. 3 (1)
20. Bingham No. 4 (1)
21. Bridgford (North) (1)
22. Bridgford (South) (1)
23. Bridgford (West) (1)
24. Carlton No. 1 (2)
25. Carlton No. 2 (2)
26. Collingham (1)
27. East Retford No. 1 (1)
28. East Retford No. 2 (1)
29. Eastwood (1)
30. Hucknall (East) (1)
31. Hucknall (North) (1)
32. Kirkby-in-Ashfield (East) (1)
33. Kirkby-in-Ashfield (West) (1)
34. Mansfield No. 1 (East) (1)
35. Mansfield No. 2 (South East) (1)
36. Mansfield No. 3 (South) (1)
37. Mansfield No. 4 (2)
38. Mansfield Woodhouse (2)
39. Newark No. 1 (South) (1)
40. Newark No. 2 (1)
41. Nottingham No. 1 (Bridge & Trent) (3)
42. Nottingham No. 2 (Lenton) (2)
43. Nottingham No. 3 (Manvers & St Ann (2)
44. Nottingham No. 4 (Market) (1)
45. Nottingham No. 5 (Byron & St Alban (3)
46. Nottingham No. 6 (Forest & Mapperle (3)
47. Nottingham No. 7 (Portland & Radfor (3)
48. Nottingham No. 8 (Abbey & University (3)
49. Nottingham No. 9 (Clifton) (2)
50. Nottingham No. 10 (Robin Hood & Bro (3)
51. Nottingham No. 11 (Woolaton) (2)
52. Retford (North) (1)
53. Retford (South) (1)
54. Southwell No. 1 (1)
55. Southwell No. 2 (1)
56. Southwell No. 3 (Ollerton) (1)
57. Southwell No. 4 (1)
58. Southwell No. 5 (1)
59. Sutton-in-Ashfield (East) (1)
60. Sutton-in-Ashfield (North) (1)
61. Sutton-in-Ashfield (South) (1)
62. Sutton-in-Ashfield (West) (1)
63. Warsop (1)
64. Worksop No. 1 (East) (1)
65. Worksop No. 2 (North) (1)
66. Worksop No. 3 (1)
67. Worksop Rural No. 1 (Blyth) (1)
68. Worksop Rural No. 2 (1)

Electoral Divisions from 7 May 1981 to 5 May 2005:

1. Abbey (1); electoral division abolished in 1998
2. Arnold Central (1) †
3. Arnold East (1) †
4. Arnold West (1) †
5. Aspley (1); electoral division abolished in 1998
6. Balderton (1)
7. Basford (1); electoral division abolished in 1998
8. Beechdale (1); electoral division abolished in 1998
9. Beeston North (1)
10. Beeston South (1)
11. Bestwood Park (1); electoral division abolished in 1998
12. Bilborough (1); electoral division abolished in 1998
13. Bingham (1)
14. Blidworth (1)
15. Blyth & Harworth (1)
16. Bramcote & Stapleford East (1)
17. Bridge (1); electoral division abolished in 1998
18. Bulwell East (1); electoral division abolished in 1998
19. Bulwell West (1); electoral division abolished in 1998
20. Byron (1); electoral division abolished in 1998
21. Calverton (1) †
22. Carlton Central (1) †
23. Carlton East (1) †
24. Carlton South (1) †
25. Carlton West (1) †
26. Caunton (1)
27. Chilwell (1)
28. Clifton East (1); electoral division abolished in 1998
29. Clifton West (1); electoral division abolished in 1998
30. Collingham (1)
31. Cotgrave (1)
32. Cumberlands & Ladybrook (1)
33. East Leake (1)
34. Eastwood & Brinsley (1)
35. Greasley & Nuthall (1)
36. Greenwood (1); electoral division abolished in 1998
37. Hucknall East (1)
38. Hucknall West (1)
39. Keyworth (1)
40. Kimberley & Trowell (1)
41. Kirkby-in-Ashfield North (1)
42. Kirkby-in-Ashfield South (1)
43. Leeming & Forest Town (1)
44. Lenton (1); electoral division abolished in 1998
45. Manvers (1); electoral division abolished in 1998
46. Mapperley (1); electoral division abolished in 1998
47. Misterton (1)
48. Newark North (1)
49. Newark South (1)
50. Newstead (1) †
51. Northfield & Manor (1)
52. Oak Tree & Lindhurst (1)
53. Oakham & Berry Hill (1)
54. Ollerton (1)
55. Pleasley Hill & Broomhill (1)
56. Portland (1); electoral division abolished in 1998
57. Radcliffe-on-Trent (1)
58. Radford (1); electoral division abolished in 1998
59. Ravensdale & Sherwood (1)
60. Retford North (1)
61. Retford South (1)
62. Robin Hood (1); electoral division abolished in 1998
63. Ruddington (1)
64. Rufford (1)
65. Selston (1)
66. Sherwood (1); electoral division abolished in 1998
67. Southwell (1)
68. St Anns (1); electoral division abolished in 1998
69. Stapleford North & West (1)
70. Strelley (1); electoral division abolished in 1998
71. Sutton-in-Ashfield Central (1)
72. Sutton-in-Ashfield East (1)
73. Sutton-in-Ashfield North (1)
74. Sutton-in-Ashfield West (1)
75. Titchfield & Eakring (1)
76. Toton & Attenborough (1)
77. Trent (1); electoral division abolished in 1998
78. Tuxford (1)
79. Warsop (1)
80. West Bridgford East (1)
81. West Bridgford South (1)
82. West Bridgford West (1)
83. Wilford (1); electoral division abolished in 1998
84. Wollaton (1); electoral division abolished in 1998
85. Worksop East (1)
86. Worksop North & Carlton (1)
87. Worksop South East & Welbeck (1)
88. Worksop West (1)

† minor boundary changes in 1989

Electoral Divisions from 5 May 2005 to 4 May 2017:

1. Arnold North (2)
2. Arnold South (2)
3. Balderton (1)
4. Beauvale (1)
5. Beeston North (1)
6. Beeston South & Attenborough (1)
7. Bingham (1)
8. Blidworth (1)
9. Blyth & Harworth (1)
10. Bramcote & Stapleford (2)
11. Calverton (1)
12. Carlton East (2)
13. Carlton West (2)
14. Chilwell & Toton (2)
15. Collingham (1)
16. Cotgrave (1)
17. East Mansfield (2)
18. Eastwood (1)
19. Farndon & Muskham (1)
20. Farnsfield & Lowdham (1)
21. Hucknall (3)
22. Keyworth (1)
23. Kimberley & Trowell (1)
24. Kirkby in Ashfield North (1)
25. Kirkby in Ashfield South (1)
26. Misterton (1)
27. Newark East (1)
28. Newark West (1)
29. Newstead (1)
30. North Mansfield (2)
31. Nuthall (1)
32. Ollerton (1)
33. Radcliffe on Trent (1)
34. Retford East (1)
35. Retford West (1)
36. Ruddington (1)
37. Rufford (1)
38. Selston (1)
39. Soar Valley (1)
40. South Mansfield (2)
41. Southwell & Caunton (1)
42. Sutton in Ashfield Central (1)
43. Sutton in Ashfield East (1)
44. Sutton in Ashfield North (1)
45. Sutton in Ashfield West (1)
46. Tuxford (1)
47. Warsop (1)
48. West Bridgford Central & South (2)
49. West Bridgford West (1)
50. West Mansfield (2)
51. Worksop East (1)
52. Worksop North (1)
53. Worksop North East & Carlton (1)
54. Worksop West (1)

Electoral Divisions from 4 May 2017 to present:

1. Ashfields (1)
2. Arnold North (2)
3. Arnold South (2)
4. Balderton (1)
5. Beeston Central & Rylands (1)
6. Bingham East (1)
7. Bingham West (1)
8. Blidworth (1)
9. Blyth & Harworth (1)
10. Bramcote & Beeston North (1)
11. Calverton (1)
12. Carlton East (1)
13. Carlton West (2)
14. Collingham (1)
15. Cotgrave (1)
16. Eastwood (1)
17. Farndon & Trent (1)
18. Greasley & Brinsley (1)
19. Hucknall North (1)
20. Hucknall South (1)
21. Hucknall West (1)
22. Keyworth (1)
23. Kirkby North (1)
24. Kirkby South (1)
25. Leake & Ruddington (2)
26. Mansfield East (2)
27. Mansfield North (2)
28. Mansfield South (2)
29. Mansfield West (2)
30. Misterton (1)
31. Muskham & Farnsfield (1)
32. Newark East (1)
33. Newark West (1)
34. Newstead (1)
35. Nuthall & Kimberley (1)
36. Ollerton (1)
37. Radcliffe on Trent (1)
38. Retford East (1)
39. Retford West (1)
40. Selston (1)
41. Sherwood Forest (1)
42. Southwell (1)
43. Stapleford & Broxtowe Central (2)
44. Sutton Central & East (1)
45. Sutton North (1)
46. Sutton West (1)
47. Toton, Chilwell & Attenborough (2)
48. Tuxford (1)
49. Warsop (1)
50. West Bridgford North (1)
51. West Bridgford South (1)
52. West Bridgford West (1)
53. Worksop East (1)
54. Worksop North (1)
55. Worksop South (1)
56. Worksop West (1)

== Unitary authority council ==
=== Nottingham ===
Wards from 1 April 1974 (first election 7 June 1973) to 6 May 1976:

1. Abbey (3)
2. Bridge (3)
3. Broxtowe (3)
4. Byron (3)
5. Clifton (3)
6. Forest (3)
7. Lenton (3)
8. Manvers (3)
9. Mapperley (3)
10. Market (3)
11. Portland (3)
12. Radford (3)
13. Robin Hood (3)
14. St Alban's (3)
15. St Ann's (3)
16. Trent (3)
17. University (3)
18. Wollaton (3)

Wards from 6 May 1976 to 1 May 2003:

1. Abbey (2)
2. Aspley (2)
3. Basford (2)
4. Beechdale (2)
5. Bestwood Park (2)
6. Bilborough (2)
7. Bridge (2)
8. Bulwell East (2)
9. Bulwell West (2)
10. Byron (3)
11. Clifton East (2)
12. Clifton West (2)
13. Forest (2)
14. Greenwood (2)
15. Lenton (2)
16. Manvers (2)
17. Mapperley (2)
18. Park (2)
19. Portland (2)
20. Radford (2)
21. Robin Hood (2)
22. Sherwood (2)
23. St Ann's (2)
24. Strelley (2)
25. Trent (2)
26. Wilford (2)
27. Wollaton (2)

Wards from 1 May 2003 to 2 May 2019:

1. Arboretum (2)
2. Aspley (3)
3. Basford (3)
4. Berridge (3)
5. Bestwood (3)
6. Bilborough (3)
7. Bridge (2)
8. Bulwell (3)
9. Bulwell Forest (3)
10. Clifton North (3)
11. Clifton South (3)
12. Dales (3)
13. Dunkirk & Lenton (2)
14. Leen Valley (2)
15. Mapperley (3)
16. Radford & Park (3)
17. Sherwood (3)
18. St Ann's (3)
19. Wollaton East & Lenton Abbey (2)
20. Wollaton West (3)

Wards from 2 May 2019 to present:

1. Aspley (3)
2. Basford (3)
3. Berridge (3)
4. Bestwood (3)
5. Bilborough (3)
6. Bulwell (3)
7. Bulwell Forest (3)
8. Castle (2)
9. Clifton East (3)
10. Clifton West (2)
11. Dales (3)
12. Hyson Green & Arboretum (3)
13. Leen Valley (2)
14. Lenton & Wollation East (3)
15. Mapperley (3)
16. Meadows (2)
17. Radford (2)
18. Sherwood (3)
19. St. Ann's (3)
20. Wollaton West (3)

== District councils ==
=== Ashfield ===
Wards from 1 April 1974 (first election 7 June 1973) to 6 May 1976:

1. Annesley & Felley (1)
2. Hucknall East (4)
3. Hucknall North (4)
4. Hucknall West (6)
5. Kirkby in Ashfield East (5)
6. Kirkby in Ashfield South (3)
7. Kirkby in Ashfield West (5)
8. Selston (5)
9. Sutton in Ashfield East (7)
10. Sutton in Ashfield Huthwaite (3)
11. Sutton in Ashfield Skegby (5)
12. Sutton in Ashfield West (7)

Wards from 6 May 1976 to 1 May 2003:

1. Hucknall Central (2)
2. Hucknall East (2)
3. Hucknall North (2)
4. Hucknall West (2)
5. Jacksdale (1)
6. Kirkby in Ashfield Central (2)
7. Kirkby in Ashfield East (2)
8. Kirkby in Ashfield West (2)
9. Selston (2)
10. Sutton in Ashfield Central (3)
11. Sutton in Ashfield East (3)
12. Sutton in Ashfield North (3)
13. Sutton in Ashfield West (3)
14. Underwood (1)
15. Woodhouse (3)

Wards from 1 May 2003 to 7 May 2015:

1. Hucknall Central (2)
2. Hucknall East (2)
3. Hucknall North (2)
4. Hucknall West (3)
5. Jacksdale (1)
6. Kirkby in Ashfield Central (2)
7. Kirkby in Ashfield East (2)
8. Kirkby in Ashfield West (2)
9. Selston (2)
10. Sutton in Ashfield Central (3)
11. Sutton in Ashfield East (3)
12. Sutton in Ashfield North (3)
13. Sutton in Ashfield West (3)
14. Underwood (1)
15. Woodhouse (2)

Wards from 7 May 2015 to present:

1. Abbey Hill (1)
2. Annesley & Kirkby Woodhouse (2)
3. Ashfields (1)
4. Carsic (1)
5. Greenwood & Summit (2)*
6. Hucknall Central (2)
7. Hucknall North (3)
8. Hucknall South (2)
9. Hucknall West (3)
10. Huthwaite & Brierley (2)
11. Jacksdale & Westwood (1)**
12. Kingsway (1)
13. Kirkby Cross & Portland (1)
14. Larwood (1)
15. Leamington (1)
16. Selston (2)
17. Skegby (2)
18. Stanton Hill & Teversal (1)
19. Sutton Central & New Cross (2)***
20. Sutton Junction & Harlow Wood (1)
21. Sutton St Mary's (1)****
22. The Dales (1)
23. Underwood (1)

*Summit from 2015 to 2023.
**Jackswood from 2015 to 2023.
***Central & New Cross from 2015 to 2023.
****St Mary's from 2015 to 2023.

=== Bassetlaw ===
Wards from 1 April 1974 (first election 7 June 1973) to 3 May 1979:

1. Beckingham (1)
2. Blyth (1)
3. Carlton (3)
4. Clarborough (1)
5. East Markham (1)
6. East Retford East (3)
7. East Retford North (4)
8. East Retford West (3)
9. Elkesley (1)
10. Everton (1)
11. Harworth (4)
12. Hodsock (1)
13. Misterton (1)
14. Nether Langwith (1)
15. North Leverton (1)
16. Rampton (1)
17. Ranskill (1)
18. Sutton (1)
19. Trent (1)
20. Tuxford (1)
21. Worksop Bracebridge (3)
22. Worksop North (3)
23. Worksop North East (4)
24. Worksop North West (3)
25. Worksop South East (3)
26. Worksop South West (3)

Wards from 3 May 1979 to 2 May 2002:

1. Beckingham (1)
2. Blyth (1)
3. Carlton (3)
4. Clayworth (1)
5. East Markham (1)
6. East Retford East (3)
7. East Retford North (3)
8. East Retford West (3)
9. Elkesley (1)
10. Everton (1)
11. Harworth East (2)
12. Harworth West (2)
13. Hodsock (2)
14. Misterton (1)
15. Rampton (1)
16. Ranskill (1)
17. Sturton (1)
18. Sutton (1)
19. Trent (1)
20. Tuxford (1)
21. Welbeck (1)
22. Worksop East (3)
23. Worksop North (3)
24. Worksop North East (3)
25. Worksop North West (3)
26. Worksop South (3)
27. Worksop South East (3)

Wards from 2 May 2002 to present:

1. Beckingham (1)
2. Blyth (1)
3. Carlton (3)
4. Clayworth (1)
5. East Markham (1)
6. East Retford East (3)
7. East Retford North (3)
8. East Retford South (2)
9. East Retford West (2)
10. Everton (1)
11. Harworth (3)
12. Langold (1)
13. Misterton (1)
14. Rampton (1)
15. Ranskill (1)
16. Sturton (1)
17. Sutton (1)
18. Tuxford & Trent (2)
19. Welbeck (1)
20. Worksop East (3)
21. Worksop North (3)
22. Worksop North East (3)
23. Worksop North West (3)
24. Worksop South (3)
25. Worksop South East (3)

=== Broxtowe ===
Wards from 1 April 1974 (first election 7 June 1973) to 6 May 1976:

1. Awsworth & Cossall (2)
2. Beeston North (4)
3. Beeston South (5)
4. Bramcote (5)
5. Brinsley (1)
6. Chilwell (6)
7. Eastwood East (2)
8. Eastwood North (1)
9. Eastwood South (2)
10. Greasley (3)
11. Kimberley (2)
12. Nuthall (2)
13. Stapleford (6)
14. Strelley & Trowell (1)
15. Toton & Attenborough (4)

Wards from 6 May 1976 to 1 May 2003:

1. Attenborough (2)
2. Awsworth & Cossall (2)
3. Beeston Central (3)
4. Beeston North East (3)
5. Beeston North West (2)
6. Beeston Rylands (2)
7. Bramcote (3)
8. Brinsley (1)
9. Chilwell East (3)
10. Chilwell West (3)
11. Eastwood East (2)
12. Eastwood North (1)
13. Eastwood South (2)
14. Greasley (3)
15. Kimberley (3)
16. Nuthall (2)
17. Stapleford East (3)
18. Stapleford North (3)
19. Stapleford West (3)
20. Strelley & Trowell (1)
21. Toton (2)

Wards from 1 May 2003 to 7 May 2015:

1. Attenborough (1)
2. Awsworth (1)
3. Beeston Central (2)
4. Beeston North (2)
5. Beeston Rylands (2)
6. Beeston West (2)
7. Bramcote (3)
8. Brinsley (1)
9. Chilwell East (2)
10. Chilwell West (3)
11. Cossall & Kimberley (3)
12. Eastwood North & Greasley (Beauvale) (2)
13. Eastwood South (3)
14. Greasley (Giltbrook & Newthorpe) (3)
15. Nuthall East & Strelley (2)
16. Nuthall West & Greasley (Watnall) (2)
17. Stapleford North (2)
18. Stapleford South East (2)
19. Stapleford South West (2)
20. Toton & Chilwell Meadows (3)
21. Trowell (1)

Wards from 7 May 2015 to present:

1. Attenborough & Chilwell East (3)
2. Awsworth, Cossall & Trowell (2)
3. Beeston Central (2)
4. Beeston North (2)
5. Beeston Rylands (2)
6. Beeston West (2)
7. Bramcote (3)
8. Brinsley (1)
9. Chilwell West (3)
10. Eastwood Hall (1)
11. Eastwood Hilltop (2)
12. Eastwood St Mary’s (2)
13. Greasley (3)
14. Kimberley (3)
15. Nuthall East & Strelley (2)
16. Stapleford North (2)
17. Stapleford South East (2)
18. Stapleford South West (2)
19. Toton & Chilwell Meadows (3)
20. Watnall & Nuthall West (2)

=== Gedling ===
Wards from 1 April 1974 (first election 7 June 1973) to 6 May 1976:

1. Arnold East (7)
2. Arnold South (7)
3. Arnold West (5)
4. Bestwood Park (1)
5. Burton Joyce & Stoke Bardolph (2)
6. Calverton (2)
7. Carlton (4)
8. Carlton Hill (4)
9. Cavendish (5)
10. Gedling (5)
11. Lambley (1)
12. Linby & Papplewick (1)
13. Netherfield (3)
14. Newstead East (1)
15. Newstead West (1)
16. Porchester (5)
17. Woodborough (1)

Wards from 6 May 1976 to 1 May 2003:

1. Bestwood Park (1)
2. Bonington (3)
3. Burton Joyce & Stoke Bardolph (2)
4. Calverton (3)
5. Carlton (3)
6. Carlton Hill (3)
7. Cavendish (2)
8. Conway (2)
9. Gedling (3)
10. Killisick (2)
11. Kingswell (3)
12. Lambley (1)
13. Mapperley Plains (3)
14. Netherfield (3)
15. Newstead (1); 1976 to 1987: 2
16. Oxclose (2)
17. Phoenix (2)
18. Porchester (3)
19. Priory (2)
20. Ravenshead (3); created in 1987
21. St James (3)
22. St Marys (3)
23. Woodborough (1)
24. Woodthorpe (3)

Wards from 1 May 2003 to 7 May 2015:

1. Bestwood Village (1)
2. Bonington (3)
3. Burton Joyce & Stoke Bardolph (2)
4. Calverton (3)
5. Carlton (3)
6. Carlton Hill (3)
7. Daybrook (2)
8. Gedling (3)
9. Killisick (1)
10. Kingswell (2)
11. Lambley (1)
12. Mapperley Plains (3)
13. Netherfield & Colwick (3)
14. Newstead (1)
15. Phoenix (2)
16. Porchester (3)
17. Ravenshead (3)
18. St James (2)
19. St Marys (3)
20. Valley (2)
21. Woodborough (1)
22. Woodthorpe (3)

Wards from 7 May 2015 to present:

1. Bestwood St Albans (2)
2. Calverton (3)
3. Carlton (2)
4. Carlton Hill (3)
5. Cavendish (2)
6. Colwick (1)
7. Coppice (2)
8. Daybrook (2)
9. Dumbles (1)
10. Ernehale (2)
11. Gedling (2)
12. Netherfield (2)
13. Newstead Abbey (3)
14. Phoenix (2)
15. Plains (3)
16. Porchester (3)
17. Redhill (2)
18. Trent Valley (2)
19. Woodthorpe (2)

=== Mansfield ===
Wards from 1 April 1974 (first election 7 June 1973) to 3 May 1979:

1. Mansfield East (9)
2. Mansfield North (11)
3. Mansfield South (7)
4. Mansfield Woodhouse East (4)
5. Mansfield Woodhouse North (5)
6. Mansfield Woodhouse West (3)
7. Warsop (6)

Wards from 3 May 1979 to 1 May 2003:

1. Berry Hill (2)
2. Birklands (3)
3. Broomhill (2)
4. Cumberlands (2)
5. Eakring (2)
6. Forest Town (3)
7. Ladybrook (3)
8. Leeming (2)
9. Lindhurst (2)
10. Manor (3)
11. Meden (3)
12. Northfield (2)
13. Oak Tree (3)
14. Oakham (3)
15. Pleasley Hill (3)
16. Ravensdale (3)
17. Sherwood (2)
18. Titchfield (3)

Wards from 1 May 2003 to 5 May 2011:

1. Berry Hill (3)
2. Birklands (3)
3. Broomhill (2)
4. Cumberlands (2)
5. Eakring (3)
6. Forest Town East (2)
7. Forest Town West (3)
8. Grange Farm (2)
9. Ladybrook (2)
10. Leeming (3)
11. Lindhurst (2)
12. Meden (3)
13. Oak Tree (3)
14. Pleasley Hill (2)
15. Portland (2)
16. Priory (2)
17. Ravensdale (2)
18. Robin Hood (3)
19. Sherwood (2)

Wards from 5 May 2011 to 4 May 2023:

1. Abbott (1)
2. Berry Hill (1)
3. Brick Kiln (1)
4. Broomhill (1)
5. Bull Farm & Pleasley Hill (1)
6. Carr Bank (1)
7. Eakring (1)
8. Grange Farm (1)
9. Holly (1)
10. Hornby (1)
11. Kings Walk (1)
12. Kingsway (1)
13. Ladybrook (1)
14. Lindhurst (1)
15. Ling Forest (1)
16. Manor (1)
17. Market Warsop (1)
18. Maun Valley (1)
19. Meden (1)
20. Netherfield (1)
21. Newgate (1)
22. Newlands (1)
23. Oak Tree (1)
24. Oakham (1)
25. Park Hall (1)
26. Peafields (1)
27. Penniment (1)
28. Portland (1)
29. Racecourse (1)
30. Ransom Wood (1)
31. Sandhurst (1)
32. Sherwood (1)
33. Warsop Carrs (1)
34. Woodhouse (1)
35. Woodlands (1)
36. Yeoman Hill (1)

Wards from 4 May 2023 to present:

1. Bancroft (1)
2. Berry Hill (1)
3. Brick Kiln (1)
4. Carr Bank (1)
5. Central (1)
6. Eakring (1)
7. Grange Farm (1)
8. Holly Forest Town (1)
9. Hornby (1)
10. Kings Walk (1)
11. Kingsway Forest Town (1)
12. Lindhurst (1)
13. Ling Forest (1)
14. Manor (1)
15. Market Warsop (1)
16. Maun Valley Forest Town (1)
17. Meden (1)
18. Mill Lane (1)
19. Netherfield (1)
20. Newlands Forest Town (1)
21. Oak Tree (1)
22. Oakham (1)
23. Park Hall (1)
24. Penniment (1)
25. Pleasley (1)
26. Racecourse (1)
27. Rock Hill (1)
28. Rufford (1)
29. Sherwood (1)
30. Southwell (1)
31. Thompsons (1)
32. Vale (1)
33. Wainwright (1)
34. Warsop Carrs (1)
35. West Bank (1)
36. Yeoman Hill (1)

=== Newark and Sherwood ===
Wards from 1 April 1974 (first election 7 June 1973) to 3 May 1979:

1. Beacon (2)
2. Bilsthorpe (2)
3. Blidworth Fishpool & Rainworth (5)
4. Boughton (2)
5. Bridge (2)
6. Bullpit Pinfold (2)
7. Castle & Sconce (3)
8. Caunton (1)
9. Clipstone (2)
10. Collingham (1)
11. Devon (4)
12. Dover Beck (1)
13. Edwinstowe (3)
14. Elston (1)
15. Farndon (1)
16. Farnsfield (2)
17. Lowdham (1)
18. Magnus (2)
19. Meering (1)
20. Milton Lowfield (2)
21. Muskham (1)
22. Ollerton (4)
23. Rufford (1)
24. Southwell (3)
25. Sutton-on-Trent (1)
26. Trent (1)
27. Winthorpe (1)

Wards from 3 May 1979 to 1 May 2003:

1. Beacon (2)
2. Bilsthorpe (2)
3. Blidworth (3)
4. Boughton (3)
5. Bridge (3)
6. Bullpit Pinfold (2)
7. Castle (3)
8. Caunton (1)
9. Clipstone (2)
10. Collingham (1)
11. Devon (3)
12. Dover Beck (1)
13. Edwinstowe (3)
14. Elston (1)
15. Farndon (1)
16. Farnsfield (2)
17. Fishpool (2); ward abolished in 1987
18. Lowdham (1)
19. Magnus (2)
20. Meering (1)
21. Milton Lowfield (2)
22. Muskham (1)
23. Ollerton North (2)
24. Ollerton South (2)
25. Rainworth (2)
26. Rufford (1)
27. Southwell East (2)
28. Southwell West (2)
29. Sutton-on-Trent (1)
30. Trent (1)
31. Winthorpe (1)

Wards from 1 May 2003 to 3 May 2007:

1. Balderton North (2)
2. Balderton West (2)
3. Beacon (2)
4. Bilsthorpe (2)
5. Blidworth (2)
6. Boughton (2)
7. Bridge (2)
8. Castle (3)
9. Caunton (1)
10. Clipstone (2)
11. Collingham & Meering (2)
12. Devon (2)
13. Edwinstowe (2)
14. Farndon (2)
15. Farnsfield (2)
16. Lowdham (2)
17. Magnus (2)
18. Muskham (1)
19. Ollerton (3)
20. Rainworth (2)
21. Southwell East (1)
22. Southwell North (1)
23. Southwell West (1)
24. Sutton-on-Trent (1)
25. Trent (1)
26. Winthorpe (1)

Wards from 3 May 2007 to 7 May 2015:

1. Balderton North (2)
2. Balderton West (2)
3. Beacon (3)
4. Blidworth (2)
5. Boughton (2)
6. Bridge (2)
7. Castle (2)
8. Caunton (1)
9. Clipstone (2)
10. Collingham & Meering (2)
11. Devon (2)
12. Edwinstowe (2)
13. Farndon (2)
14. Farnsfield & Bilsthorpe (3)
15. Lowdham (2)
16. Magnus (2)
17. Muskham (1)
18. Ollerton (3)
19. Rainworth (3)
20. Southwell East (1)
21. Southwell North (1)
22. Southwell West (1)
23. Sutton-on-Trent (1)
24. Trent (1)
25. Winthorpe (1)

Wards from 7 May 2015 to present:

1. Balderton North & Coddington (2)
2. Balderton South (2)
3. Beacon (3)
4. Bilsthorpe (1)
5. Boughton (1)
6. Bridge (2)
7. Castle (1)
8. Collingham (2)
9. Devon (3)
10. Dover Beck (1)
11. Edwinstowe & Clipstone (3)
12. Farndon & Fernwood (3)
13. Farnsfield (1)
14. Lowdham (1)
15. Muskham (1)
16. Ollerton (3)
17. Rainworth North & Rufford (2)
18. Rainworth South & Blidworth (2)
19. Southwell (3)
20. Sutton-on-Trent (1)
21. Trent (1)

=== Rushcliffe ===
Wards from 1 April 1974 (first election 7 June 1973) to 6 May 1976:

1. Bingham (3)
2. Cranmer (1)
3. Keyworth (3)
4. Leake (3)
5. Edwalton (5)
6. Ruddington (4)
7. Radcliffe on Trent (5)
8. Cotgrave (2)
9. Kinoulton (1)
10. Lady Bay (5)
11. Cropwell (1)
12. Lutterell (2)
13. Musters (5)
14. Gotham (1)
15. Oak (1)
16. Rancliffe (1)
17. Soar Valley (1)
18. Stanford (1)
19. Thoroton (1)
20. Tollerton (1)
21. Wolds (2)

Wards from 6 May 1976 to 1 May 2003:

1. Abbey (3)
2. Ash Lea (3)
3. Bingham (3)
4. Bishop (1)
5. Cranmer (1)
6. Dayncourt (2)
7. Edwalton (3)
8. Gotham (1)
9. Lady Bay (3)
10. Lamcote (2)
11. Leake (3)
12. Leys (2)
13. Lutterell (3)
14. Malkin (2)
15. Manor (1)
16. Melton (3)
17. Musters (3)
18. Nevile (1)
19. North Keyworth (1)
20. Oak (1)
21. Packman (2)
22. Rancliffe (1)
23. Soar Valley (1)
24. South Keyworth (3)
25. Stanford (1)
26. Thoroton (1)
27. Tollerton (1)
28. Wiverton (1)
29. Wolds (1)

Wards from 1 May 2003 to 7 May 2015:

1. Abbey (2)
2. Bingham East (2)
3. Bingham West (2)
4. Compton Acres (2)
5. Cotgrave (3)
6. Cranmer (1)
7. Edwalton Village (2)
8. Gamston (2)
9. Gotham (1)
10. Keyworth North (1)
11. Keyworth South (3)
12. Lady Bay (2)
13. Leake (3)
14. Lutterell (2)
15. Manvers (2)
16. Melton (2)
17. Musters (2)
18. Nevile (1)
19. Oak (1)
20. Ruddington (3)
21. Soar Valley (1)
22. Stanford (1)
23. Thoroton (1)
24. Tollerton (1)
25. Trent (2)
26. Trent Bridge (2)
27. Wiverton (2)
28. Wolds (1)

Wards from 7 May 2015 to 4 May 2023:

1. Abbey (2)
2. Bingham East (2)
3. Bingham West (2)
4. Bunny (1)
5. Compton Acres (2)
6. Cotgrave (3)
7. Cranmer (1)
8. Cropwell (1)
9. East Bridgford (1)
10. Edwalton (2)
11. Gamston North (1)
12. Gamston South (1)
13. Gotham (1)
14. Keyworth & Wolds (3)
15. Lady Bay (2)
16. Leake (3)
17. Lutterell (2)
18. Musters (2)
19. Nevile & Langar (1)
20. Radcliffe on Trent (3)
21. Ruddington (3)
22. Sutton Bonington (1)
23. Thoroton (1)
24. Tollerton (1)
25. Trent Bridge (2)

Wards from 4 May 2023 to present:

1. Abbey (3)
2. Bingham North (2)
3. Bingham South (2)
4. Bunny (1)
5. Compton Acres (2)
6. Cotgrave (3)
7. Cranmer (1)
8. Cropwell (1)
9. East Bridgford (1)
10. Edwalton (2)
11. Gamston (2)
12. Gotham (2)
13. Keyworth & Wolds (3)
14. Lady Bay (2)
15. Leake (3)
16. Lutterell (1)
17. Musters (2)
18. Neville & Langar (1)
19. Newton (1)
20. Radcliffe on Trent (3)
21. Ruddington (3)
22. Soar Valley (1)
23. Tollerton (1)
24. Trent Bridge (1)

== Electoral wards by constituency ==
Wards as they existed on 1 December 2020.

=== Ashfield ===
Ashfield: Abbey Hill; Annesley & Kirkby Woodhouse; Ashfields; Carsic; Central & New Cross; Huthwaite & Brierley; Jacksdale; Kingsway; Kirkby Cross & Portland; Larwood; Leamington; St. Mary’s; Selston; Skegby; Stanton Hill & Teversal; Summit; Sutton Junction & Harlow Wood; The Dales; Underwood.

Mansfield: Berry Hill (polling district BHC); Bull Farm & Pleasley Hill.

=== Bassetlaw ===
Bassetlaw: Beckingham, Blyth, Carlton, East Retford East, East Retford North, East Retford South, East Retford West, Everton, Harworth, Langold, Misterton, Ranskill, Sutton, Welbeck, Worksop East, Worksop North, Worksop North East, Worksop North West, Worksop South, Worksop South East.

=== Broxtowe ===
Broxtowe: Attenborough & Chilwell East; Awsworth, Cossall & Trowell; Beeston Central; Beeston North; Beeston Rylands; Beeston West; Bramcote; Brinsley; Chilwell West; Eastwood Hall; Eastwood Hilltop; Eastwood St. Mary’s; Greasley; Stapleford North; Stapleford South East; Stapleford South West; Toton & Chilwell Meadows.

=== Gedling ===
Gedling: Bestwood St. Albans; Carlton; Carlton Hill; Cavendish; Colwick; Coppice; Daybrook; Dumbles; Ernehale; Gedling; Netherfield; Phoenix; Plains; Porchester; Redhill; Trent Valley; Woodthorpe.

=== Mansfield ===
Mansfield: Abbott; Berry Hill (polling districts BHA & BHB); Brick Kiln; Broomhill; Carr Bank; Eakring; Grange Farm; Holly; Hornby; Kings Walk; Kingsway; Ladybrook; Lindhurst; Ling Forest; Manor; Market Warsop; Maun Valley; Meden; Netherfield; Newgate; Newlands; Oak Tree; Oakham; Park Hall; Peafields; Penniment; Portland; Racecourse; Ransom Wood; Sandhurst; Sherwood; Warsop Carrs; Woodhouse; Woodlands; Yeoman Hill.

=== Newark ===
Bassetlaw: Clayworth; East Markham; Rampton; Sturton; Tuxford & Trent.

Newark & Sherwood: Balderton North & Coddington; Balderton South; Beacon; Bridge; Castle; Collingham; Devon; Farndon & Fernwood; Muskham; Southwell; Sutton-on-Trent; Trent.

Rushcliffe: Bingham East; Bingham West; Cranmer; East Bridgford; Thoroton.

=== Nottingham East ===
Nottingham: Berridge; Castle; Dales; Hyson Green & Arboretum; Mapperley; St. Ann’s; Sherwood.

=== Nottingham North and Kimberley ===
Broxtowe: Kimberley; Nuthall East & Strelley; Watnall & Nuthall West.

Nottingham: Aspley; Basford; Bestwood; Bulwell; Bulwell Forest; Leen Valley.

=== Nottingham South ===
Nottingham: Bilborough; Clifton East; Clifton West; Lenton & Wollaton East; Meadows; Radford; Wollaton West.

=== Rushcliffe ===
Rushcliffe: Abbey; Bunny; Compton Acres; Cotgrave; Cropwell; Edwalton; Gamston North; Gamston South; Gotham; Keyworth & Wolds; Lady Bay; Leake; Lutterell; Musters; Nevile & Langar; Radcliffe on Trent; Ruddington; Sutton Bonington; Tollerton; Trent Bridge.

=== Sherwood Forest ===
Ashfield: Hucknall Central; Hucknall North; Hucknall South; Hucknall West.

Gedling: Calverton; Newstead Abbey.

Newark & Sherwood: Bilsthorpe; Boughton; Dover Beck; Edwinstowe & Clipstone; Farnsfield; Lowdham; Ollerton; Rainworth North & Rufford; Rainworth South & Blidworth.

== See also ==
- List of parliamentary constituencies in Nottinghamshire
