= St Nicholas Church, Whiston =

Coordinates: 53.4069°N 2.8030°W

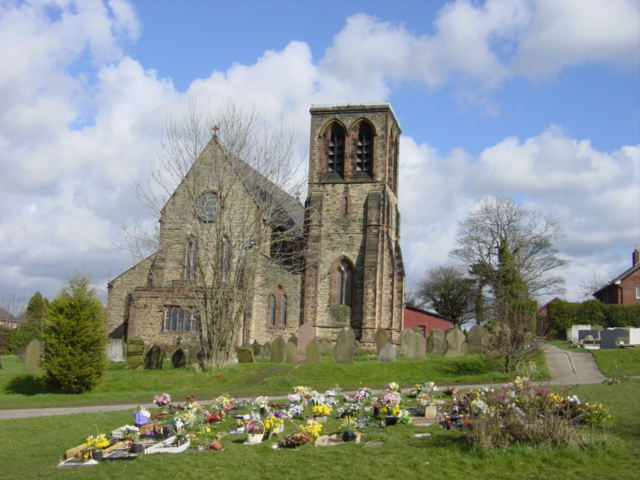
- St Nicholas Church from the west

- Location in Merseyside
- OS grid reference: SJ 467 903
- Location: Windy Arbour Road, Whiston, Merseyside
- Country: England
- Denomination: Anglican
- Churchmanship: Evangelical
- Website: St Nicholas, Whiston

History
- Status: Parish church
- Dedication: Saint Nicholas
- Consecrated: 30 July 1868

Architecture
- Functional status: Active
- Heritage designation: Grade II
- Designated: 28 January 1971
- Architect: G. E. Street
- Architectural type: Church
- Style: Gothic Revival (Early English)
- Groundbreaking: 1864
- Completed: 1868

Specifications
- Materials: Sandstone, slate roofs

Administration
- Province: York
- Diocese: Liverpool
- Archdeaconry: Liverpool
- Deanery: Huyton
- Parish: St Nicholas, Whiston

Clergy
- Vicar: Revd Andy Telfer

St Nicholas Church is in Windy Arbour Road, Whiston, Merseyside, England. It is an active Anglican parish church in the diocese of Liverpool. The church was built in 1864–68 and designed by G. E. Street in Early English style. Its tower was never completed because of a fear of subsidence. The stained glass in the church includes windows designed by William Morris and Edward Burne-Jones. The church is recorded in the National Heritage List for England as a designated Grade II listed building.

== History ==
The church was built between 1864 and 1868, it was designed by G. E. Street, and consecrated on 30 July 1868. Plans had been made by G. F. Bodley to add a crenellated parapet to the tower but, because of concern that the extra weight could result in subsidence due to local coal mining, it was never carried out.

== Architecture ==
=== Exterior ===
St Nicholas is in Early English style. It is constructed in coursed rubble sandstone with dressings in red sandstone, and it has slate roofs. Its plan consists of a four-bay nave with a clerestory and a west vestry, north and south aisles, a chancel with its roof at a lower level, a north organ chamber, and a south Lady Chapel. At the southwest is a tower that is almost detached from the church. The tower is in three stages, it has buttresses, and on the east wall is a stair turret with a conical roof. The bell openings have two lights and are paired, the parapet is plain, and the tower has a flat lead roof. The church is entered through a doorway in the south side of the tower. Most of the windows are lancets, many of which are in pairs with a roundel above. The west wall of the nave also has a rose window, and in the west wall of the vestry is a five-light straight-headed window. The east window has three lights.

=== Interior ===
Inside the church the arcades between the nave and the aisles are carried on cylindrical piers with moulded capitals, and there is a two-bay arcade between the chancel and the chapel. The church is floored with encaustic tiles. There is a low stone chancel screen that is integrated with the drum pulpit. The choir stalls are decorated with fleur-de-lis finials and have carved arcades on the front. In the chancel is a painted reredos, and this is flanked by carved arcading and patterned wall tiles. The stained glass in the east window is by Clayton and Bell and depicts the Crucifixion. In the Lady Chapel the glass in its east window was designed by William Morris and depicts musicians in the form of angels. The glass in the rose window was designed by Edward Burne-Jones, and other windows were made by Morris & Co. The first pipe organ in the church was made by T. C. Lewis and Company in 1873. This was superseded in 1934 by an organ made by C. H. Walker. The organ has since been increased in size; it has two manuals and 26 stops.

== Appraisal ==
On 28 January 1971 the church was designated as a Grade II listed building. Grade II is the lowest of the three grades of listing, and is applied to buildings that are "nationally important and of special interest". In the Buildings of England series, the architectural historians Pollard and Pevsner describe the church as "an earnest work of architecture with nothing done just to please".

== Present day ==
St Nicholas is an active Anglican parish church in the deanery of Huyton, the archdeaconry of Liverpool, and the diocese of Liverpool, and its style of worship is Evangelical. The church holds regular services on Sundays, organises other events, and arranges baptisms, weddings and funerals.

== See also ==
- Listed buildings in Whiston, Merseyside
