= Heyford Park =

Coordinates: 51.932°N 1.249°W

- Civil parish
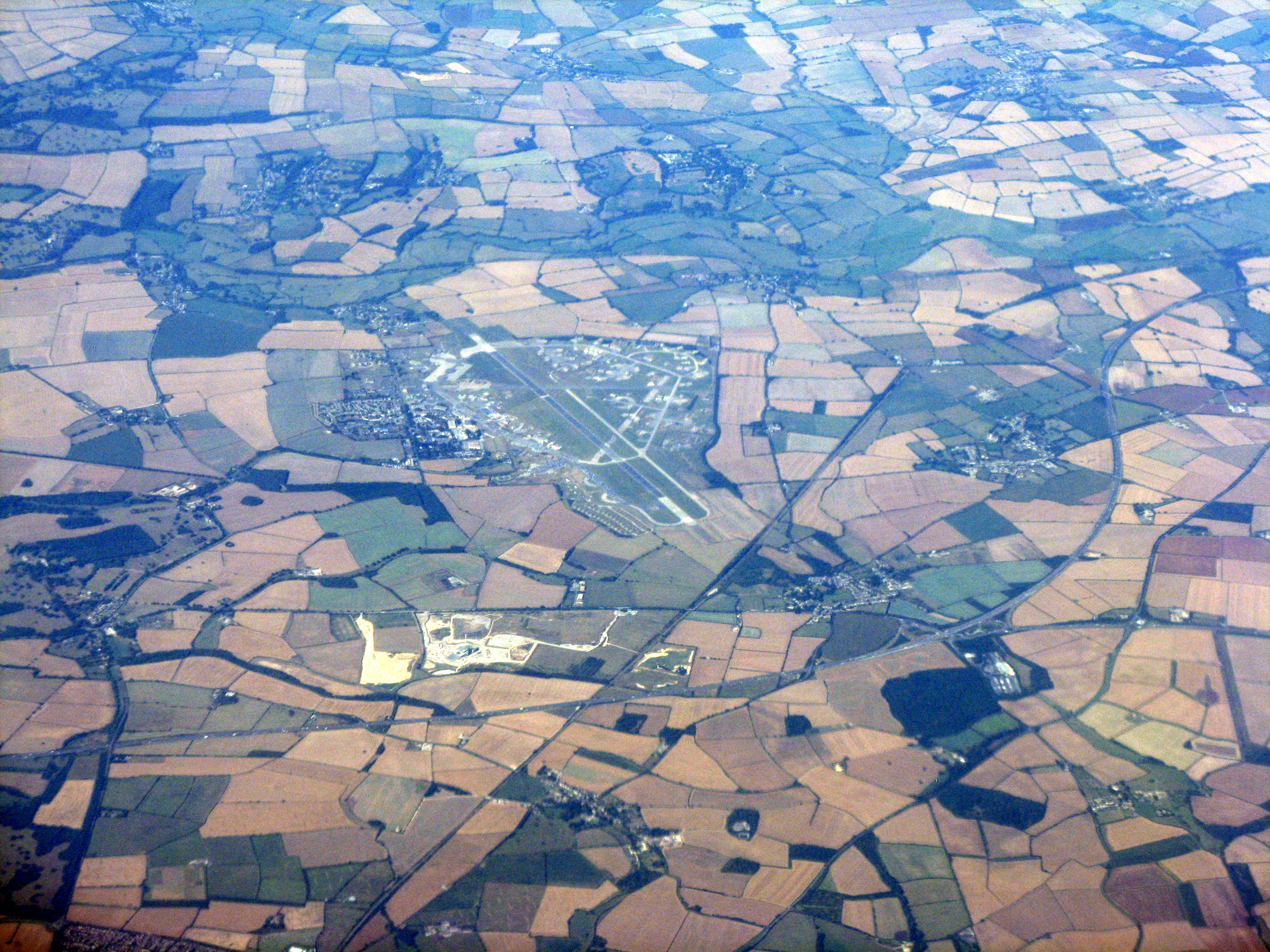
- RAF Upper Heyford and the surrounding area

- Location within Oxfordshire
- Area: 3.331 km^{2} (1.286 sq mi)
- Population: 2,475
  - Density: 743/km^{2} (1,920/sq mi)
- Civil parish: Heyford Park
- District: Cherwell
- Shire county: Oxfordshire
- Region: South East
- Country: England
- Sovereign state: United Kingdom
- Post town: Bicester
- Postcode district: OX
- Dialling code: 01869
- Police: Thames Valley
- Fire: Oxfordshire
- Ambulance: South Central
- UK Parliament: Bicester and Woodstock; Banbury
- Website: Heyford Park Parish Council

Heyford Park is a civil parish in the Cherwell district of Oxfordshire, England. It was created in 2019 from portions of the parishes of Ardley, Somerton and Upper Heyford. The proposal to create the new parish was made by Upper Heyford Parish Council in January 2017. The parish council initially had seven seats, and nominations for candidates to fill these were opened in March 2019, the election to be held on 2 May 2019. The parish includes most of the former RAF Upper Heyford airfield and Heyford Park School. It is bordered by the civil parishes of Somerton, Ardley, Middleton Stoney, Lower Heyford and Upper Heyford, all being in the Cherwell district.

Until the 2024 United Kingdom general election, the parish lay entirely within the Banbury constituency. Following that election, the parish has been represented by two Members of Parliament: the portion ceded from Somerton remains within the Banbury constituency, but the bulk of the parish now lies within the new Bicester and Woodstock constituency.

The Heyford Park name can also be attributed to the housing development by Dorchester Living which was acquired by the property development group in 2014. Dorchester Living state "We acquired the site in 2009 and gained initial consent for 1,075 homes". The development companies' 'Master Plan' comprises a village green, extensive leisure and retail facilities, and a new free school, all of which have now been built, bringing the current development area to over 700 homes within a 1231 acre plot in the Oxfordshire countryside.

== Environmental concerns ==
In 2026, concerns were raised regarding the presence of per- and polyfluoroalkyl substances (PFAS), commonly known as "forever chemicals", in watercourses near the former RAF Upper Heyford airbase.
