= Whiston, Merseyside =

Coordinates: 53.413°N 2.798°W

Whiston
- Town
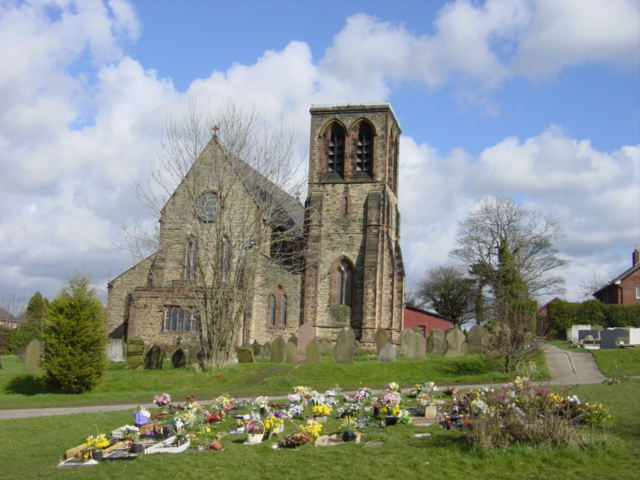
- St Nicholas' Church

- Location within Merseyside
- Population: 14,263 (2011 Census)
- OS grid reference: SJ4791
- Civil parish: Whiston
- Metropolitan borough: Knowsley
- Metropolitan county: Merseyside
- Region: North West
- Country: England
- Sovereign state: United Kingdom
- Post town: PRESCOT
- Postcode district: L35
- Dialling code: 0151
- Police: Merseyside
- Fire: Merseyside
- Ambulance: North West
- UK Parliament: St Helens South and Whiston

Whiston is a town and civil parish within the Metropolitan Borough of Knowsley in Merseyside, England. It is located 8 miles (10 km) east of Liverpool. The population was 13,629 in 2001, increasing to 14,263 in 2011.

Whiston is a town and civil parish in the Metropolitan Borough of Knowsley, Merseyside, England, located to the east of Liverpool. It borders the neighbouring towns and villages of Prescot, Huyton, Tarbock and Rainhill, and is best known as the home of Whiston Hospital, one of the largest teaching hospitals in North West England.

The creation of a new village within the town, Halsnead Garden Village, was approved in 2017. It will host over 1,500 homes, a primary school, a park, and various community facilities. Construction is estimated to cost around £270 million.

== History ==
The first record of Whiston comes in 1245, being rendered as "Quistan" and being within the West Derby Hundred in Lancashire. Archeological evidence such as a Neolithic polished hand-axe and mesolithic tool fragments suggest that the region was host to pre-historic settlement up to 12,000 years, ago while other archaeological finds include remnants of a Roman tile workshop in nearby Tarbock and a medieval shovel head.

The main industry of Whiston's earlier documented history is agriculture, with the first recorded mill in the area being held by local lord Henry Travers from 1190. By 1521, the first documentation of coal mining is made, which would in time become Whiston's primary industry. By 1700, the coalfields of Whiston, Prescot, and Sutton were producing 25,000-50,000 tonnes of coal annually, and this would only increase as the Industrial Revolution progressed and the Whiston area became host to tens of collieries over the 18th and 19th Centuries. By 1901, the population of Whiston was 3,430.

The Church of St. Nicholas on Windy Arbor Road was consecrated on 30 July 1868, replacing a chapel dating from 1846. It hosts a war memorial, designed by Sir Giles Gilbert Scott, which was struck by lightning in 1928. The memorial was replaced in 1932. The stone-built Methodist Church on the High Street dates from the 19th century.

Following World War II, Liverpool faced a housing crisis due to extensive bomb damage and the poor conditions of many inner-city districts. To accommodate displaced families, large-scale developments were planned in surrounding areas, including Whiston, as part of a broader strategy to relocate thousands of residents to new, modern housing estates. This period saw a dramatic expansion of Whiston’s population as families from Liverpool moved into newly built council estates, bringing with them a strong cultural identity rooted in the city's working-class traditions.

The influx of Liverpool residents shaped Whiston’s social and cultural character, with many retaining strong ties to their former communities. Liverpool’s distinct sense of community, dialect, and traditions became deeply embedded in Whiston, influencing local life, from the way people spoke to the shared connection with Liverpool’s football culture, music scene, and working-class values. Despite being administratively separate from Liverpool, Whiston has remained culturally aligned with the city, with many residents continuing to work, shop, and socialise there.

Even as housing developments expanded and private homes were introduced in later decades, Whiston’s identity as a Liverpool overspill town has endured. Generations of families with Liverpool roots have remained in the area, reinforcing its connection to the city. Today, Whiston continues to serve as a residential hub for those seeking proximity to Liverpool while maintaining a local community that reflects its historical role in the city's post-war expansion.

Whiston had a sanatorium, an isolation hospital, and a workhouse, part of the Prescot Union workhouses.

Whiston was previously host to Halsnead Hall, a neoclassical manor that housed the Willis family, chief landholders in Whiston from 1684 until the auctioning of their estate in 1929. Halsnead Hall, demolished in 1932 and now the site of Halsnead static caravan park, was designed by the renowned architect Sir John Soane. Before its demolition, it was the sole example of Soane's work in either Lancashire or Cheshire.

== Governance ==
Prior to boundary changes in 2016, Whiston consisted of the Whiston North and Whiston South wards of the Metropolitan Borough of Knowsley. The North and South wards were separated by the Liverpool to Manchester Railway, which runs directly through the town. The former borough wards of North and South are still used in the form of Town Council wards, but for the purposes of Borough representation, Whiston elects three councillors via the combined ward of Whiston and Cronton.

Whiston lent its name to and was formerly the headquarters of the Whiston Rural District within the County of Lancashire before the Local Government Act 1972. Today, Whiston Town Council oversees parish level administration.

== Transport ==
Whiston is crossed by the historic Liverpool to Manchester Railway, and is served by Whiston railway station with services to Liverpool Lime Street and Manchester Oxford Road, operated by Northern. Local bus routes to Huyton, Liverpool, Runcorn, and St Helens also serve the town. These are primarily operated by Arriva and Stagecoach, alongside smaller local providers.

== Health ==
St Helens and Knowsley Teaching Hospitals NHS Trust operates Whiston Hospital, which supports the primary maternity department for Knowsley and St Helens, alongside a regional burns and plastic surgery unit serving northwest England, north Wales, and the Isle of Man. The Trust is a member organisation of the teaching hospital system partnered with the University of Liverpool, Liverpool John Moores University, and Edge Hill University.

== Industries ==
Local industry includes Glen Dimplex Home Appliances, which produced kitchen appliances and employs approximately 1,000 people.

== Education ==
=== Primary education ===
- St Luke's Catholic Primary School
- Halsnead Primary School
- Whiston Willis Primary School
- St Leo's & Southmead Catholic Primary School

=== Secondary education ===
In 2010, two of Whiston's secondary schools were closed and redeveloped under the Brown ministry's "Building Schools for the Future" scheme. This £150 million programme created seven new "Centres for Learning" to replace the 10 existing secondary schools within the Knowsley borough.

- Knowsley Higher Side Comprehensive School, Cumber Lane.

Constructed in 1964, Knowsley Higher Side Comprehensive School was one of the first comprehensive schools in the local area, purpose built under the Labour Party's education reforms to formally abolish the tripartite system of education; to amalgamate grammar, technical and secondary modern schools into one appropriately named Comprehensive System. In March 2010, after serving the local area for 46 years, Higher Side Comprehensive School was permanently closed and subsequently demolished to make way for the new St Edmund Arrowsmith Catholic Centre for Learning which was constructed on vacant land behind Higher Side's main buildings. The land on which Higher Side once stood now serves as a car park and recreational area for staff and pupils of the new St Edmund Arrowsmith.

The only remaining building of the former Higher Side School site is the former Whiston & Prescot City Learning Centre (CLC), now St Edmund Arrowsmith Science Hub. The building was originally constructed and opened in 2000. Pupils of the school who were still enrolled at Higher Side at the time its closure were transferred to its replacement Knowsley Park Centre for Learning (now The Prescot School) based on Knowsley Park Lane, Prescot.

- St Edmund Arrowsmith Catholic Academy, Whiston, Cumber Lane.

Closed, relocated and rebuilt behind the former Knowsley Higher Side Comprehensive School on Cumber Lane. Renamed as 'St Edmund Arrowsmith Catholic Centre for Learning' for a while. The original St Edmund Arrowsmith Building on Scotchbarn Lane was retained for several years and redeveloped as a youth training academy, but has also since been demolished.

== Notable people ==
- Alan Allport, historian
- Peter Briggs, screenwriter
- Melanie C, singer and Spice Girls member
- Martin Dwyer, jockey
- Steven Gerrard, footballer
- Steve Hampson, rugby league player
- Jamie Harrison, cricketer
- Craig Hignett, footballer
- Martin Kelly, footballer
- David Leather, cricketer
- Stuart Maconie, radio presenter and author
- Kym Marsh, actress and singer
- Conor McAleny, footballer
- Dave McCabe, lead singer and guitarist of The Zutons
- Natalie McCool, songwriter and musician
- Rachel McDowall, actress
- James Roby, rugby league player
- Willy Russell, screenwriter and playwright
- Matty Smith, rugby league player
- William Snowden, cricketer
- Mark Ward, footballer

== See also ==
- List of hospitals in England
- Listed buildings in Whiston, Merseyside
