= Garden city movement =

Urban planning movement

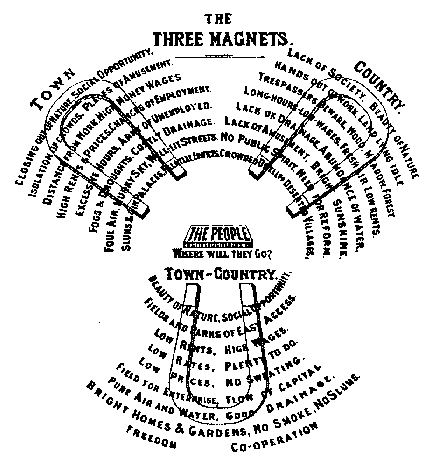
Ebenezer Howard's three magnets diagram, which addressed the question, "Where will the people go?", with three choices being: "Town", "Country", or "Town-Country".

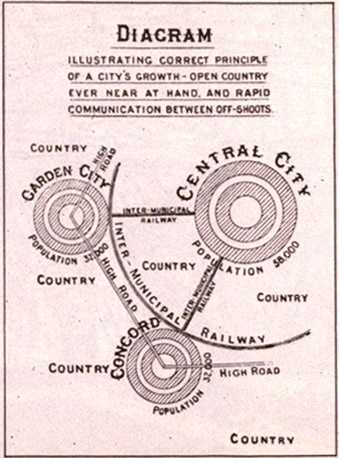
Ebenezer Howard's "Diagram illustrating correct principle of a city's growth"

The garden city movement is a 20th-century urban planning movement that promoted satellite communities surrounding a central city, separated by green belts. These garden cities would contain proportionate areas of residences, industry, and agriculture. Ebenezer Howard first posited the idea in 1898 as a way to capture the primary benefits of the countryside and the city while avoiding the disadvantages presented by both. In the early 20th century, Letchworth and Welwyn Garden City were built near London according to Howard's concept, and many other garden cities inspired by his model have since been built all over the world.

== History ==
=== Conception ===
According to urban theorist Lewis Mumford, Howard's ideas had an antecedent in Leonardo da Vinci's proposal to separate Milan into ten smaller cities to relieve congestion and pestilence.

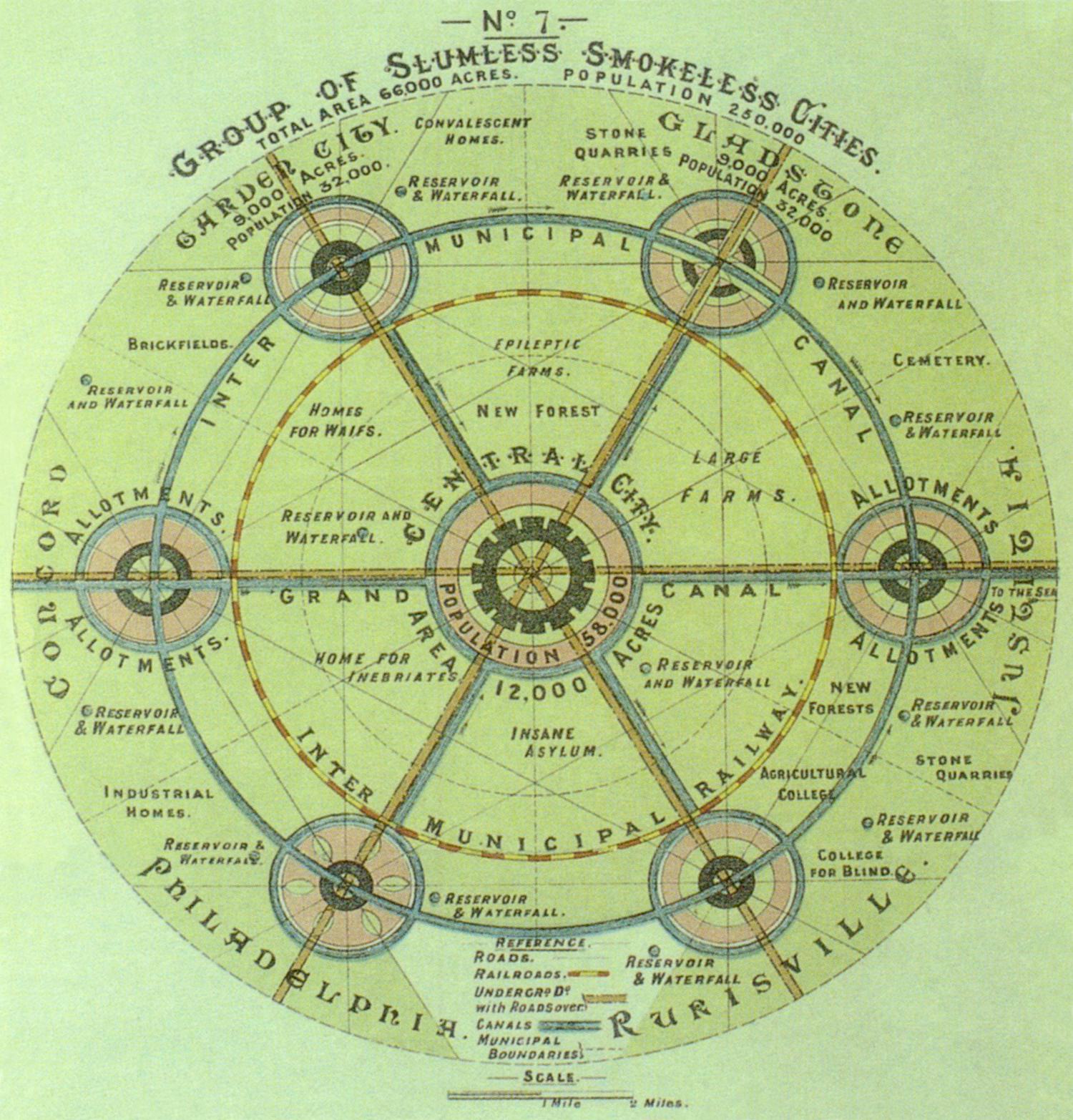
Howard's diagram illustrating the Garden City concept

Inspired by the utopian novel Looking Backward by Edward Bellamy, and Henry George's work Progress and Poverty, Howard published the book To-morrow: a Peaceful Path to Real Reform in 1898 (reissued in 1902 as Garden Cities of To-morrow). His idealised garden city would house 32,000 people on a site of 9,000 acres (3,600 ha). Howard's diagrams present such a city in a concentric pattern with open spaces, public parks, and six radial boulevards, 120 ft (37 m) wide, extending from the centre. He makes it clear that the actual site planning should be left to experts. The garden city would be self-sufficient, and when it reached full population, another would be developed nearby. Howard envisages a cluster of several garden cities as satellites of a central city of 58,000 people, linked by road and rail. Howard's diagrams are quite similar to the urban planner and social reformer Adelheid von Poninska's suggestion of a "green ring" around cities a few decades earlier.

The success of Howard's book provided him with the support necessary to pursue the opportunity to bring his vision to life. Howard believed that all people agreed that the overcrowding and deterioration of cities were one of the troubling issues of their time. He quotes several respected thinkers and their disdain for cities. Howard's garden city concept combines the town and country to provide the working class an alternative to working on farms or in "crowded, unhealthy cities".

Howard envisions the garden city as a "third magnet" which will draw residents and small businesses from both the too-crowded city and the too-isolated countryside. He theorizes that it would thus shield people from the social ills of rapid industrialization through population and density limits, strict land use controls, and shared ownership with collective management.

=== First developments ===
To build a garden city, Howard needed money to buy land. He decided to get funding from "gentlemen of responsible position and undoubted probity and honour". He founded the Garden City Association (later known as the Town and Country Planning Association or TCPA), which created First Garden City, Ltd. in 1899 to create the garden city of Letchworth. However, these donors would collect interest on their investment if the garden city generated profits through rents or, as Fishman calls the process, "philanthropic land speculation". Howard tried to include working class cooperative organisations, which included over two million members, but could not win their financial support. Because he had to rely only on the wealthy investors of First Garden City, Howard had to make concessions to his plan, such as eliminating the cooperative ownership scheme with no landlords, short-term rent increases, and hiring architects who did not agree with his rigid design plans.

In 1904, Raymond Unwin, a noted architect and town planner, and his partner Barry Parker won the competition run by First Garden City Ltd. to plan Letchworth, an area 34 miles outside London. Unwin and Parker planned the town in the centre of the Letchworth estate with a large agricultural green belt surrounding the town. They shared Howard's view that the working class deserved better, more affordable housing. However, the architects ignored Howard's symmetric design, instead replacing it with a more 'organic' design.

Letchworth slowly attracted more residents because it brought in manufacturers through low taxes, low rents, and more space. Despite Howard's best efforts, the home prices in this garden city could not remain affordable for blue-collar workers to live in. The population comprised mostly skilled middle class workers. After a decade, the First Garden City became profitable and started paying dividends to its investors. Although many viewed Letchworth as a success, it did not immediately inspire government investment into the next line of garden cities.

In reference to the lack of government support for garden cities, Frederic James Osborn, a colleague of Howard and his eventual successor at the Garden City Association, recalled Howard saying, "The only way to get anything done is to do it yourself." Likely in frustration, Howard bought land at Welwyn to house the second garden city in 1919. The purchase was at auction, with money Howard desperately and successfully borrowed from friends. The Welwyn Garden City Corporation was formed to oversee the construction. But Welwyn did not become self-sustaining because it was only 20 miles from London.

Even into the 1930s, Letchworth and Welwyn remained the only garden cities in the United Kingdom. However, the movement did succeed in emphasizing the need for urban planning policies that eventually led to the new towns movement.

== Garden cities: the spread of an idea ==
Garden city principles greatly influenced the design of colonial and post-colonial capitals in the early 20th century. This is the case for New Delhi (designed as the capital of British India after World War I), of Canberra (capital of Australia established in 1913), and of Quezon City (established in 1939, capital of the Philippines from 1948 to 1976). Outside the British Empire, the ideas quickly spread as well.

== Early examples ==
=== Africa ===
- Morocco: Ifrane, established 1929.
- South Africa. The suburbs of Pinelands, Meadowridge, and Edgemead in Cape Town as well as Durbanville near Cape Town.

=== Asia ===
- Mandatory Palestine. The movement influenced Scottish urbanist Patrick Geddes in the planning of Tel Aviv, Israel, in the 1920s, during the British Mandate for Palestine. Geddes started his Tel Aviv plan in 1925 and submitted the final version in 1927, so all growth during the 1930s was merely "based" on the Geddes plan. Changes were inevitable. Similarly, in the 1920s, German-born Jewish architect Richard Kauffman designed several neighborhoods under garden city influence, including Beth HaKerem, Rehavia, Bayit ve-Gan and Kiryat Moshe in Jerusalem, as well as Hadar HaCarmel, Bat Galim, Newe Shaanan, and Central and Western Carmel in Haifa as well as the historical center of Afula. He referred to these neighborhoods as "garden suburbs."
- Japan. Den-en-chofu, Yamato Village (around Rikugi-en Gardens), and Omiya Bonsai Village. As with many garden cities, despite goals of creating classless societies, each of these examples became increasingly exclusive and populated primarily by wealthy statesmen and celebrities.
- Vietnam. Da Lat, established 1907.

=== Europe ===
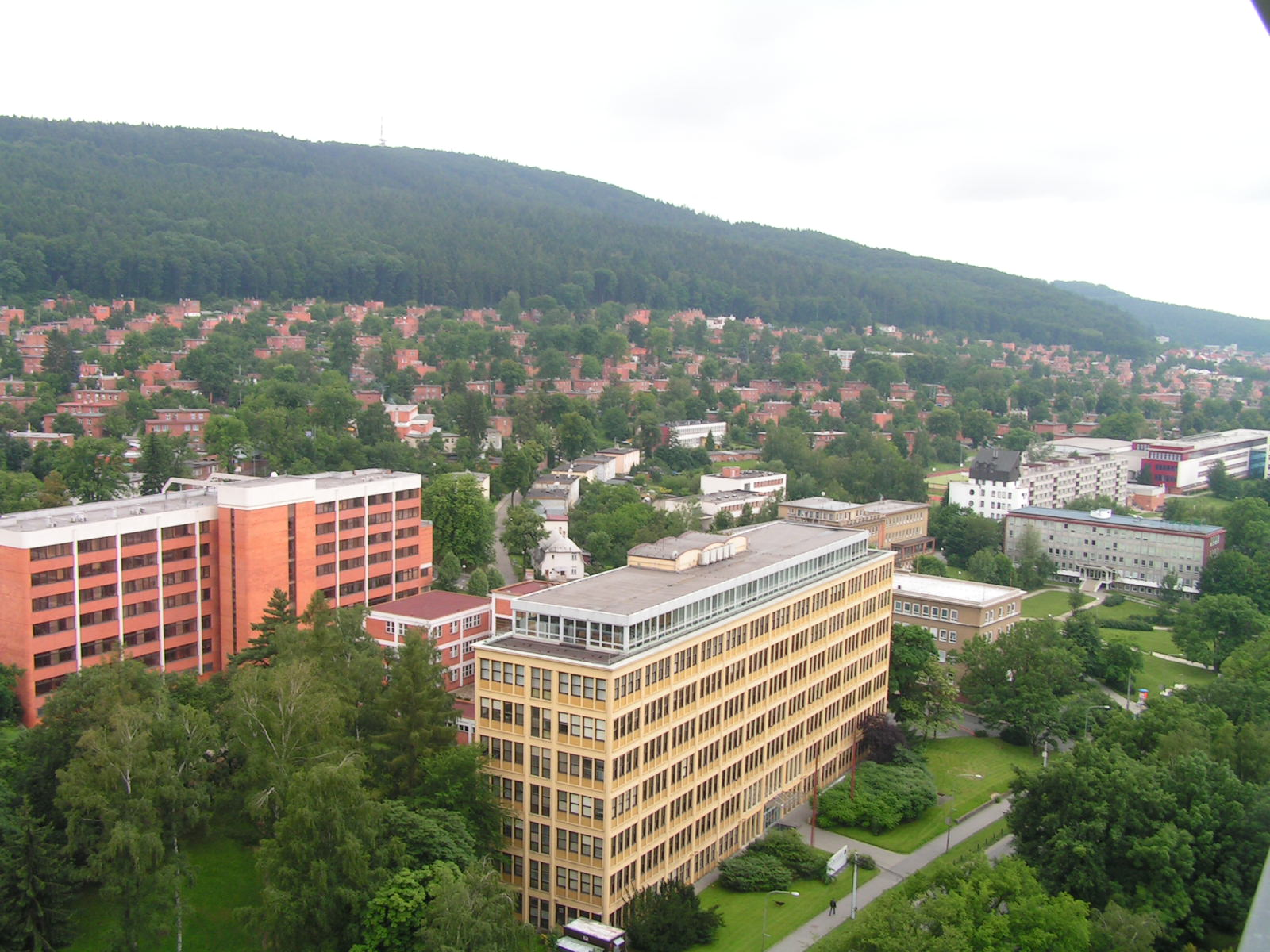
An attempt at a garden city: Zlín in Czechia (architect: František Lydie Gahura)

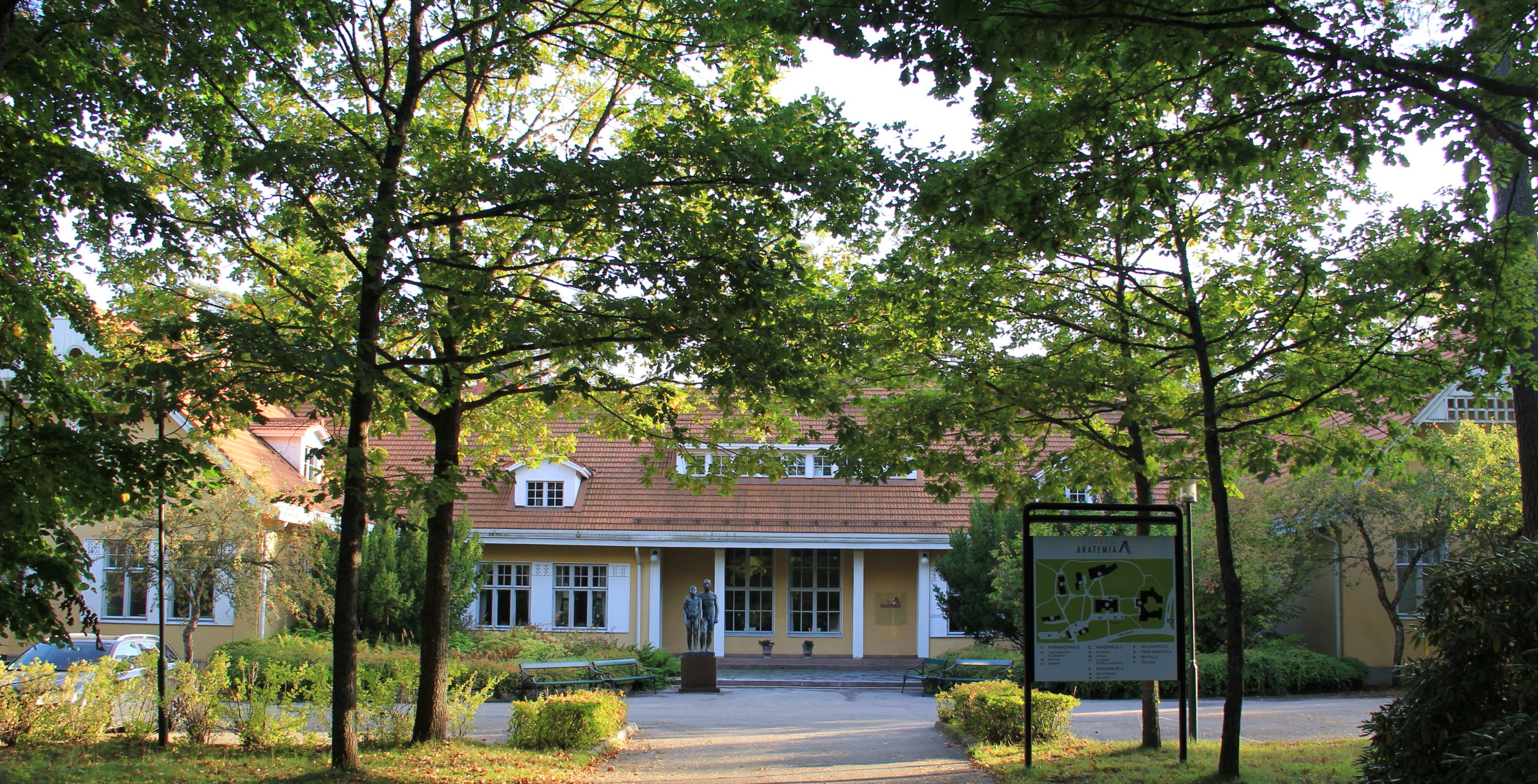
The Workers Academy in Kauniainen, the garden city of Finland

- Belgium. The garden city movement started early but took roots in the 1910s, directly connected to industrial development, especially that of the coal mines. Early examples are Tuinwijk Beringen-Mijn (1908), Tuinwijk van Zwartberg (1910), and Eisden-Tuinwijk (1911). After the First World War, there was a huge need for new housing, and the principles were widely applied. Social housing associations were created, often linked to political movements. In Brussels, Antwerp, and Ghent, extensions of the cities were built.
- Czech Republic and Slovakia. All industrial cities founded or reconstructed by the Bata Shoes company (Zlín, Svit, Partizánske) were influenced by the garden city concept.
- Finland. Kauniainen is an early example, founded in 1906 by the corporation AB Grankulla. However, the most famous would be Tapiola.
- France. The concept of garden city (cité jardin) was closely related to the concept of the 'workers city' (cité ouvrière). All over the country settlements were established accordingly.
- Germany. Along with the UK, Germany was at the forefront of the Garden Cities movement, which began in the late 19th century and was part of a broader discourse on social renewal. Specific projects were typically the results of private initiatives.
- Hungary. Wekerletelep, established 1908.
- Poland. Komorów, Podkowa Leśna, Brwinów, and Milanówek are based on the garden-city concept.
- Netherlands. The concept was widely applied in different parts of the country, mainly as garden villages, such as Tuindorp Vreewijk, Hengelo, Tuindorp Oostzaan, and Tuindorp Watergraafsmeer. In most cases, private industrial companies took the initiative. The development continued on a bigger scale after the Second World War, now initiated and controlled by municipalities, with examples such as the Westelijke Tuinsteden.
- United Kingdom. Letchworth and Welwyn Garden City; Rosyth
- Ukraine. Nova Kakhovka.

=== North America ===
- Canada. Grand Falls-Windsor, Newfoundland and Labradour, initiated in 1905, is one of the first garden cities outside of England. The historic townsite of Powell River, British Columbia, and the Hydrostone district of Halifax, Nova Scotia, are recognized as National Historic Sites of Canada. The Ontario towns of Don Mills (now incorporated into Toronto) and Walkerville (now incorporated into Windsor), as well as The Kingsway, Toronto and the Montreal suburb of Mount Royal. In Montreal, la Cité-jardin du Tricentenaire (Tricentennial Garden-City) is a classic form of garden city located in front of Maisonneuve Park and near the Olympic Stadium. All streets are cul-de-sacs and are linked via pedestrian paths to the community park.
- United States. Examples include Residence Park in New Rochelle, New York; Woodbourne in Boston; Newport News, Virginia's Hilton Village; Pittsburgh's Chatham Village; Garden City, New York (the name "Garden City", as it applied to the Stewart-designed city on Long Island, incorporated in 1869, pre-dates the garden city movement); Sunnyside; Jackson Heights; Forest Hills Gardens, in Queens, New York; Radburn, New Jersey; Greenbelt, Maryland; Buckingham in Arlington County, Virginia; the Lake Vista neighborhood in New Orleans; Norris, Tennessee; Baldwin Hills Village in Los Angeles; Rotunda West near Punta Gorda, Florida, and the Cleveland suburbs of Parma and Shaker Heights. Greendale, Wisconsin is one of three "greenbelt" towns planned beginning in 1935 under the direction of Rexford Guy Tugwell, head of the United States Resettlement Administration, under authority of the Emergency Relief Appropriation Act. The two other greenbelt towns are Greenbelt, Maryland (near Washington, D.C.), and Greenhills, Ohio (near Cincinnati).

=== Oceania ===
- Australia. Canberra is the largest example in Australia. The Dacey Garden Suburb (now Daceyville) was established in 1912. Colonel Light Gardens in Adelaide, South Australia. Sunshine and Lalor, in Melbourne. Pre-dating these was the garden suburb of Haberfield, established in 1901 by Richard Stanton.
- New Zealand. The Durie Hill suburb in Whanganui, designed in 1920 by Samuel Hurst Seager. Garden city ideals were also employed in the early town planning of Christchurch. Before the earthquakes of 2010 and 2011, the city infrastructure and homes were well integrated into green spaces. The rebuild blueprint rethought the garden city concept and how it would best suit the city. Greenbelts and urban green spaces have been redesigned to incorporate more living spaces.

=== South America ===
- Argentina. Ciudad Jardín Lomas del Palomar, the first garden city in South America.
- Brazil. In São Paulo: Jardim América, Jardim Europa (bairro de São Paulo), Alto da Lapa, Alto de Pinheiros, Butantã, Interlagos, Jardim da Saúde, and Cidade Jardim (bairro de São Paulo) (Garden City in Portuguese). Goiânia, capital of Goiás state, and Maringá.
- Peru. In 1966, the Residencial San Felipe in Lima's district of Jesus Maria was built.

== Criticisms ==
While garden cities were praised as an alternative to overcrowded, industrial cities and for greater sustainability, they were often criticized for damaging the economy, destroying the beauty of nature, and being inconvenient. According to A. Trystan Edwards, garden cities engendered desecration of the countryside by trying to recreate countryside suburbs that could spread on their own; however, this was not a feasible feat due to the limited space they had (except at their outermost edges).

More recently, the environmental movement's embrace of urban density has offered an "implicit critique" of the garden city movement. In this way, the critique of the concept resembles critiques of other suburbanization models. However, author Stephen Ward has argued that critics often do not adequately distinguish between true garden cities and more mundane dormitory city plans.

It is often referred to as an urban design experiment, which is typified by failure due to the laneways used as common entries and exits to the houses, thereby helping to develop ghetto communities and encourage crime; it has ultimately triggered efforts to eliminate public housing areas similar to that designed in Radburn, New Jersey.

When interviewed in 1998, Philip Cox (the architect responsible for introducing the design to public housing in New South Wales) was reported to have admitted with regards to an American-Radburn-designed estate in the suburb of Villawood, "everything that could go wrong in a society went wrong," and "it became the centre of drugs, it became the centre of violence and, eventually, the police refused to go into it. It was hell."

== Legacy ==
The concept of the garden city was adopted again in the UK after World War II, when the New Towns Act spurred the development of many new communities based on Howard's egalitarian ideas. It also affected town planning in other countries, such as Italy; the INA-Casa plan – a national public housing plan from the 1950s and '60s – designed several suburbs according to garden city principles: examples are found in many cities and towns of the country, such as the Isolotto suburb in Florence, Falchera in Turin, Harar in Milan, and Cesate Villaggio in Cesate (part of the Metropolitan City of Milan)

More recent applications can be found in different contexts across the world. In Bhutan's capital city Thimphu, for example, the new plan, following the Principles of Intelligent Urbanism, is an organic response to the fragile ecology. It uses sustainable concepts and is a contemporary response to the garden city concept. Epcot theme park in Bay Lake, Florida, took some influence from the garden city concept. Singapore, a tropical country, has over time incorporated various facets of the garden city concept in its urban planning to make the country a unique city in a garden. In the 1970s, the country started including concepts in its town plans to ensure that building codes and land use plans made adequate provisions for greenery and nature to become part of community development. In 1996, the National Parks Board was given the mandate to spearhead the development and maintenance of greenery and bring the island's green spaces and parks to the community.

Contemporary town-planning charters like New Urbanism and Principles of Intelligent Urbanism originated with this movement. Today, there are many garden cities in the world, but most have devolved into dormitory suburbs, which are completely different from what Howard aimed to create.

In 2007, the Town and Country Planning Association marked its 108th anniversary by calling for garden city and garden suburb principles to be applied to the present new towns and eco-towns in the United Kingdom. The campaign continued in 2013 with the publication in March of that year of "Creating Garden Cities and Suburbs Today - a guide for councils". Also in 2013, Lord Simon Wolfson announced that he would award the Wolfson Economics Prize for the best ideas on how to create a garden city.

In 2014, the Letchworth Declaration was published, which called for a body to accredit future garden cities in the UK. The declaration has a strong focus on the visible (architecture and layout) and the invisible (social, ownership, and governance) aspects of a settlement's architecture. One result was the creation of the New Garden Cities Alliance as a community interest company. It aims to be complementary to groups like the TCPA and it has adopted garden city principles as well as those from other groups, including those from Cabannes and Ross's booklet 21st Century Garden Cities of To-morrow.

=== New garden cities and towns ===
British Chancellor of the Exchequer George Osborne announced plans for a new garden city to be built at Ebbsfleet Valley, Kent, in early 2014, with a second also planned as an expansion of Bicester, Oxfordshire. The United Kingdom government announced further plans for garden towns in 2015, supporting both the development of new communities in North Essex and support for sustainable and environmentally-friendly town development in Didcot, Oxfordshire. A "Black Country Garden City" was announced in 2016 with plans to build 45,000 new homes in the West Midlands on brownfield sites.

On 2 January 2017, the government announced plans for new garden villages, each with between 1,500 and 10,000 homes, and garden towns, each with more than 10,000 homes. These smaller projects have been proposed due to opposition of "urban sprawl" in the garden city projects, as well as such quick expansion to small communities. The first wave of villages to be approved by ministers is to be located in:

- Long Marston, Warwickshire
- Oxfordshire Cotswold, Oxfordshire
- Deenethorpe
- Culm, Devon
- Welborne, Hampshire
- West Carclaze, Cornwall
- Dunton Hills, Essex
- Spitalgate Heath, Lincolnshire
- Halsnead, Merseyside
- Longcross, Surrey
- Bailrigg, Lancashire
- Infinity Garden Village, Derbyshire
- St Cuthberts, Cumbria
- North Cheshire, Cheshire

The approved garden towns are to be located in:

- Aylesbury, Buckinghamshire
- Taunton, Somerset
- Harlow & Gilston, Essex-Hertfordshire

== Diagrams ==
=== Diagrams from the 1898 edition ===
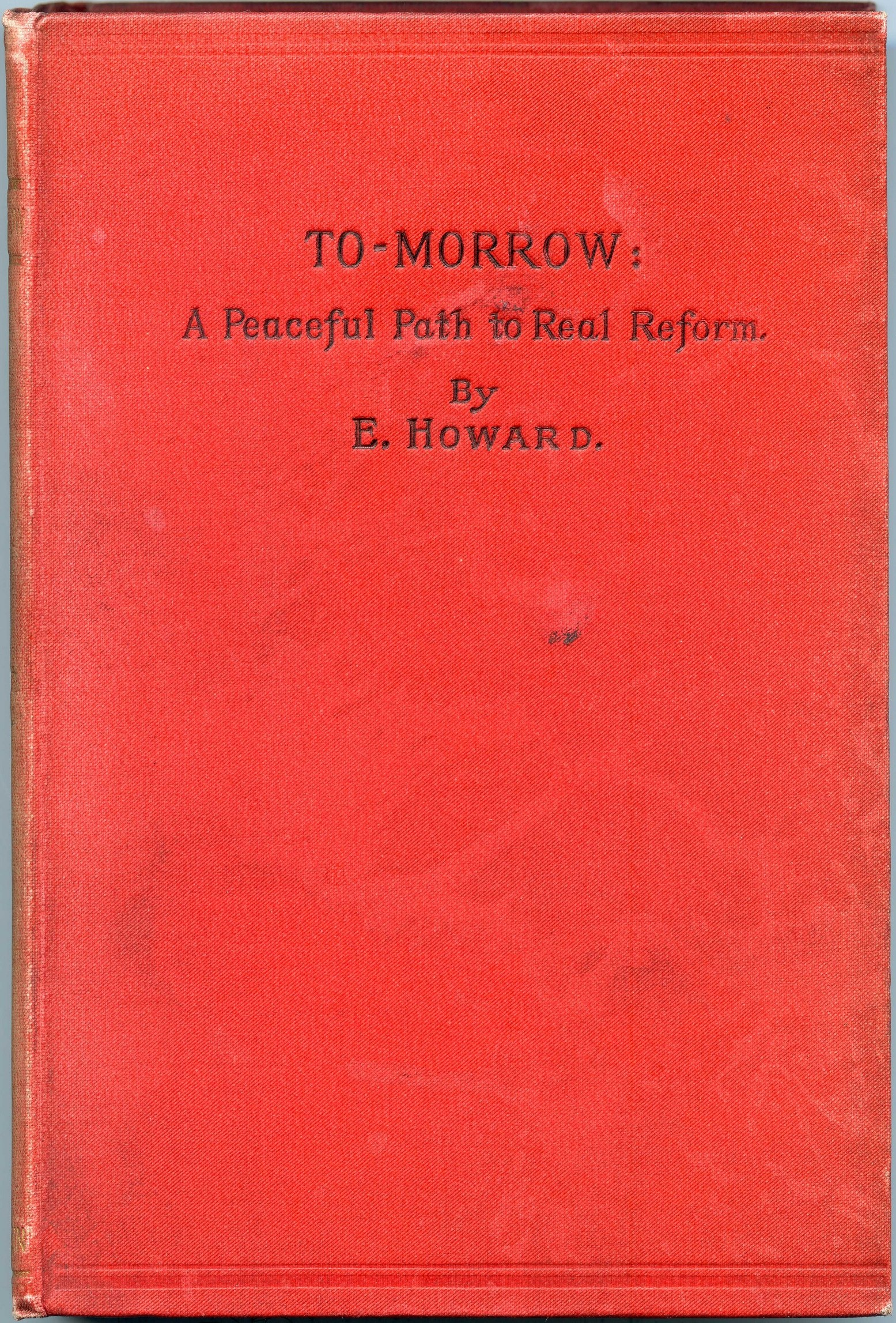
Ebenezer Howard, To-morrow: A Peaceful Path to Real Reform.

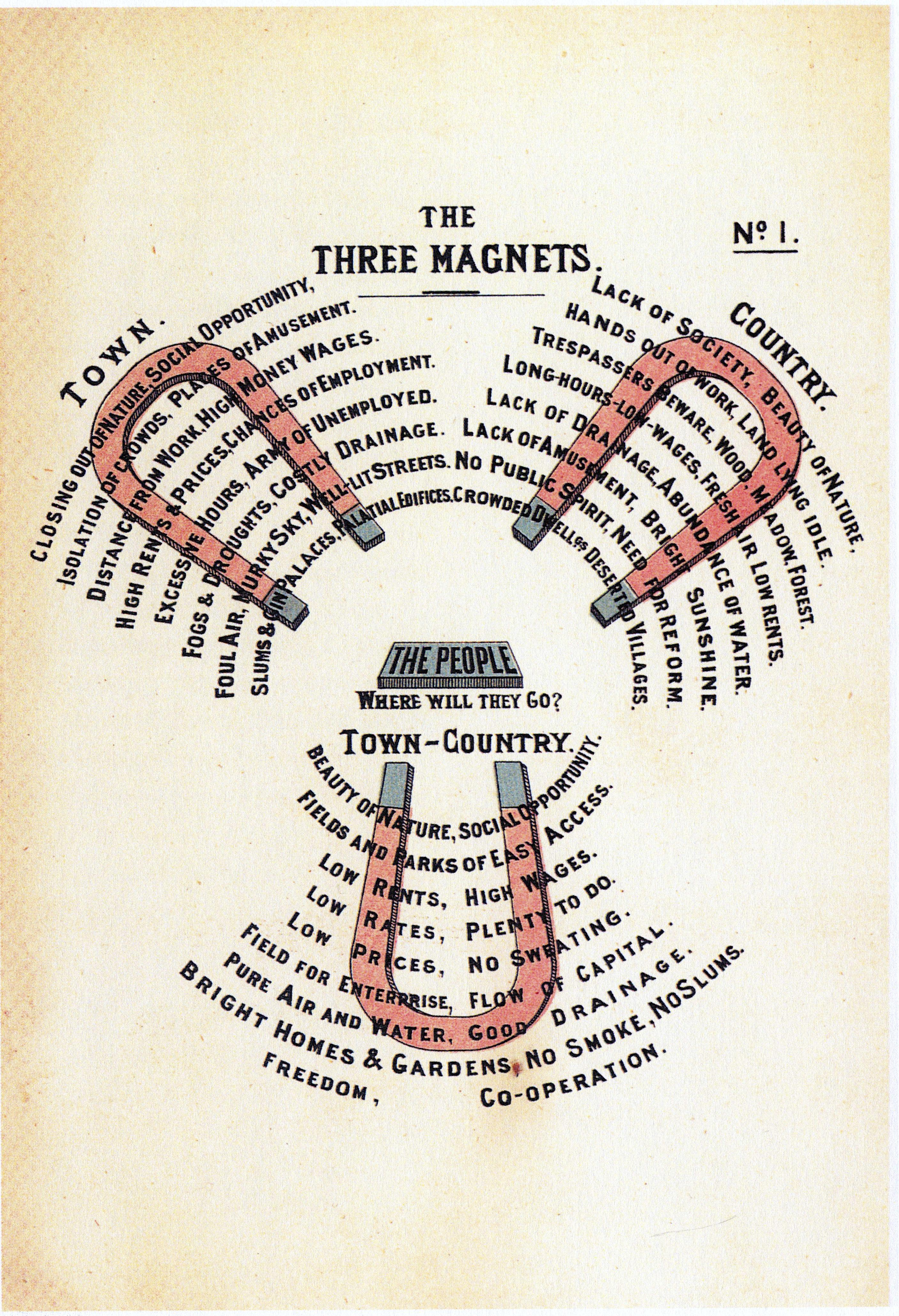
Diagram No.1: The Three Magnets (Ebenezer Howard, To-morrow: A Peaceful Path to Real Reform.)

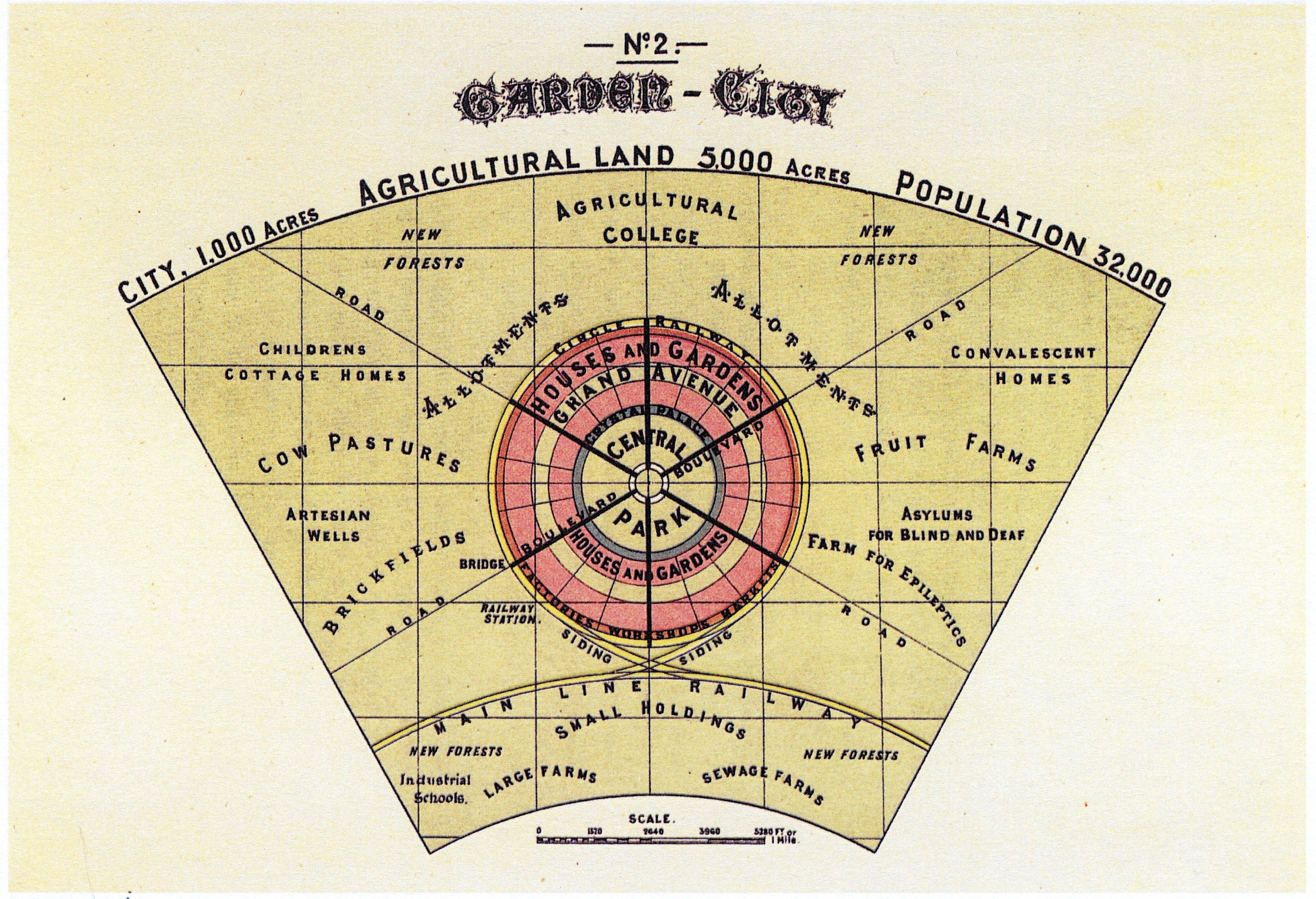
Diagram No.2 (Ebenezer Howard, To-morrow: A Peaceful Path to Real Reform.)

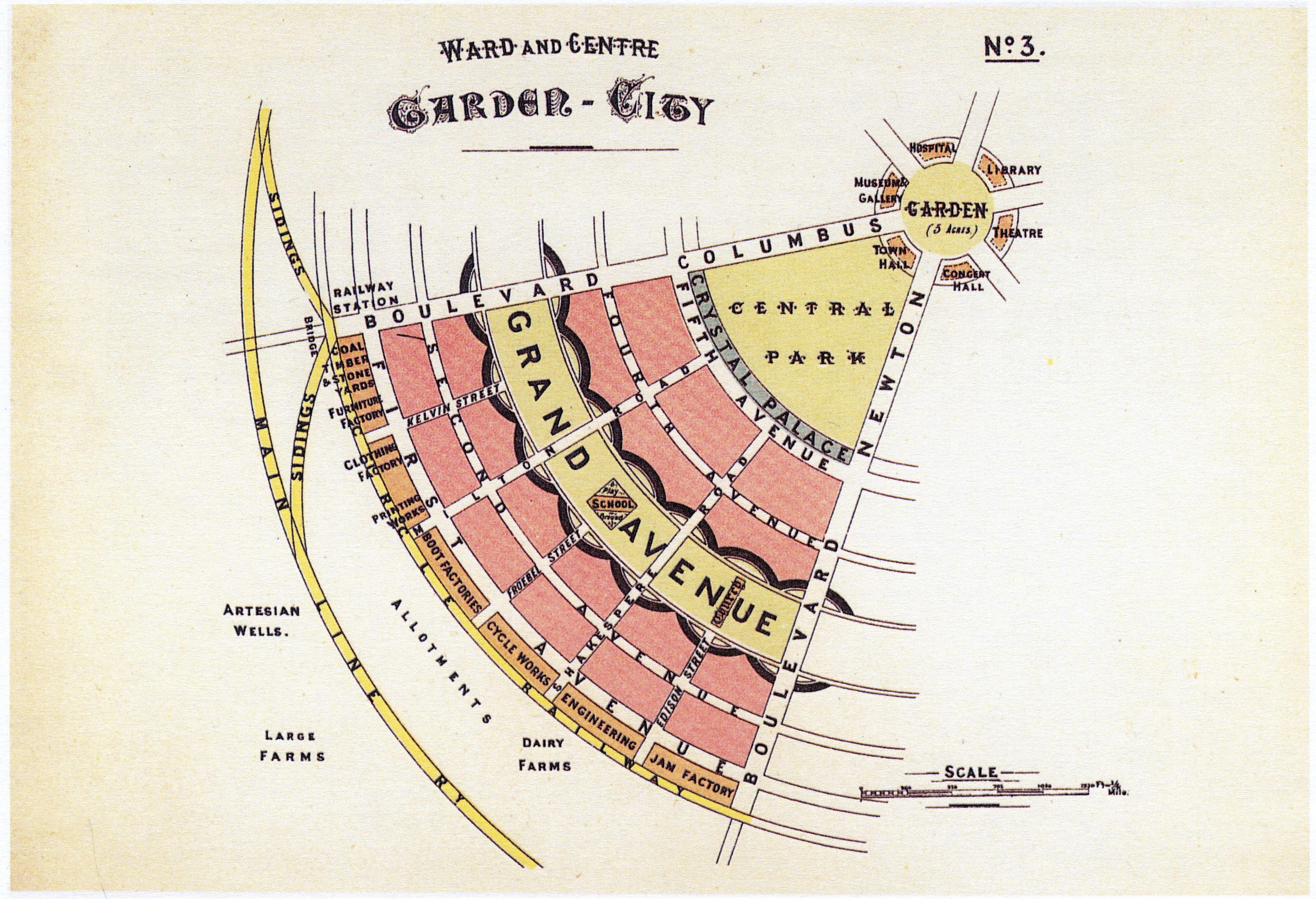
Diagram No.3 (Ebenezer Howard, To-morrow: A Peaceful Path to Real Reform.)

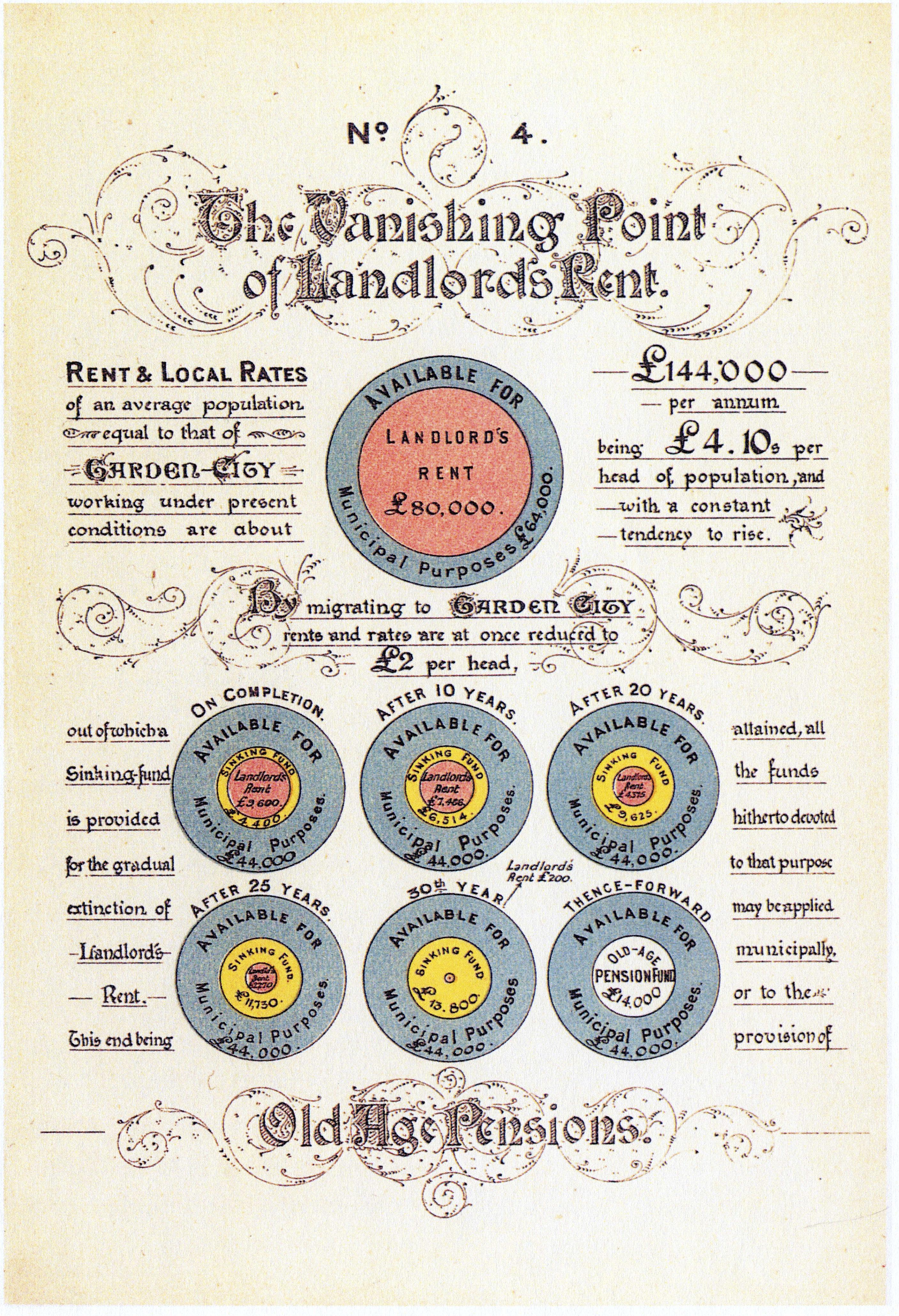
Diagram No.4 (Ebenezer Howard, To-morrow: A Peaceful Path to Real Reform.)

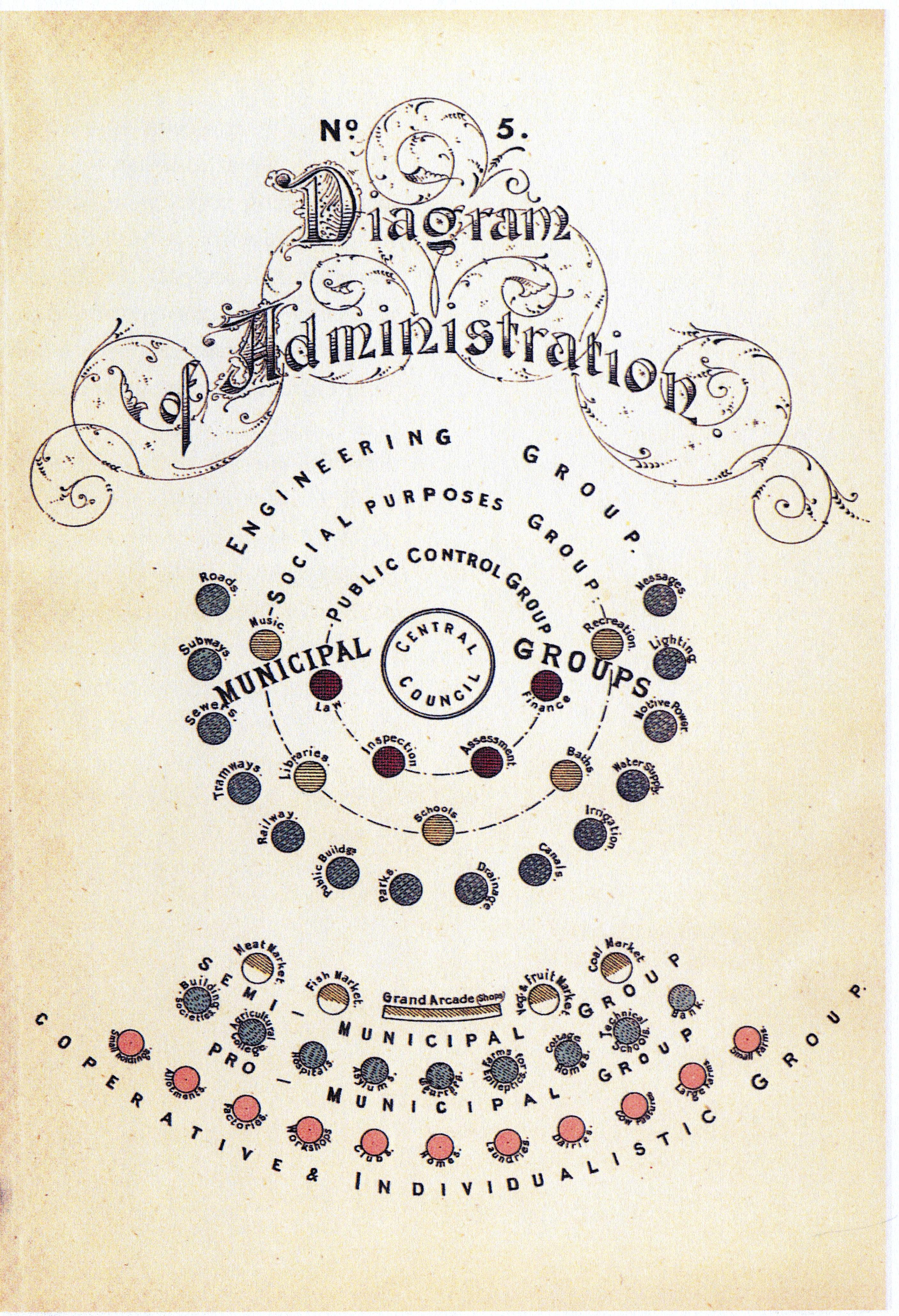
Diagram No.5 (Ebenezer Howard, To-morrow: A Peaceful Path to Real Reform.)

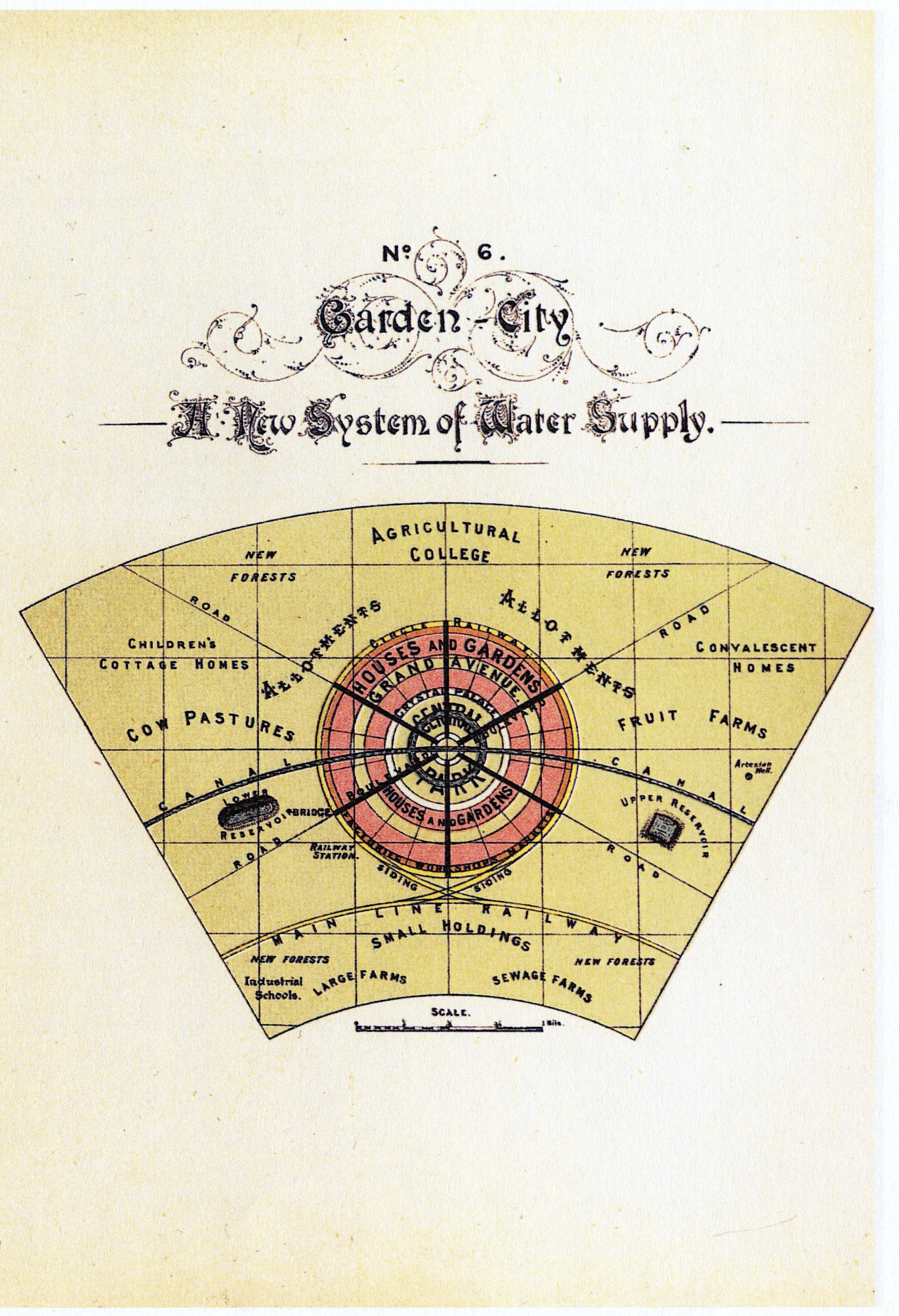
Diagram No.6 (Ebenezer Howard, To-morrow: A Peaceful Path to Real Reform.)

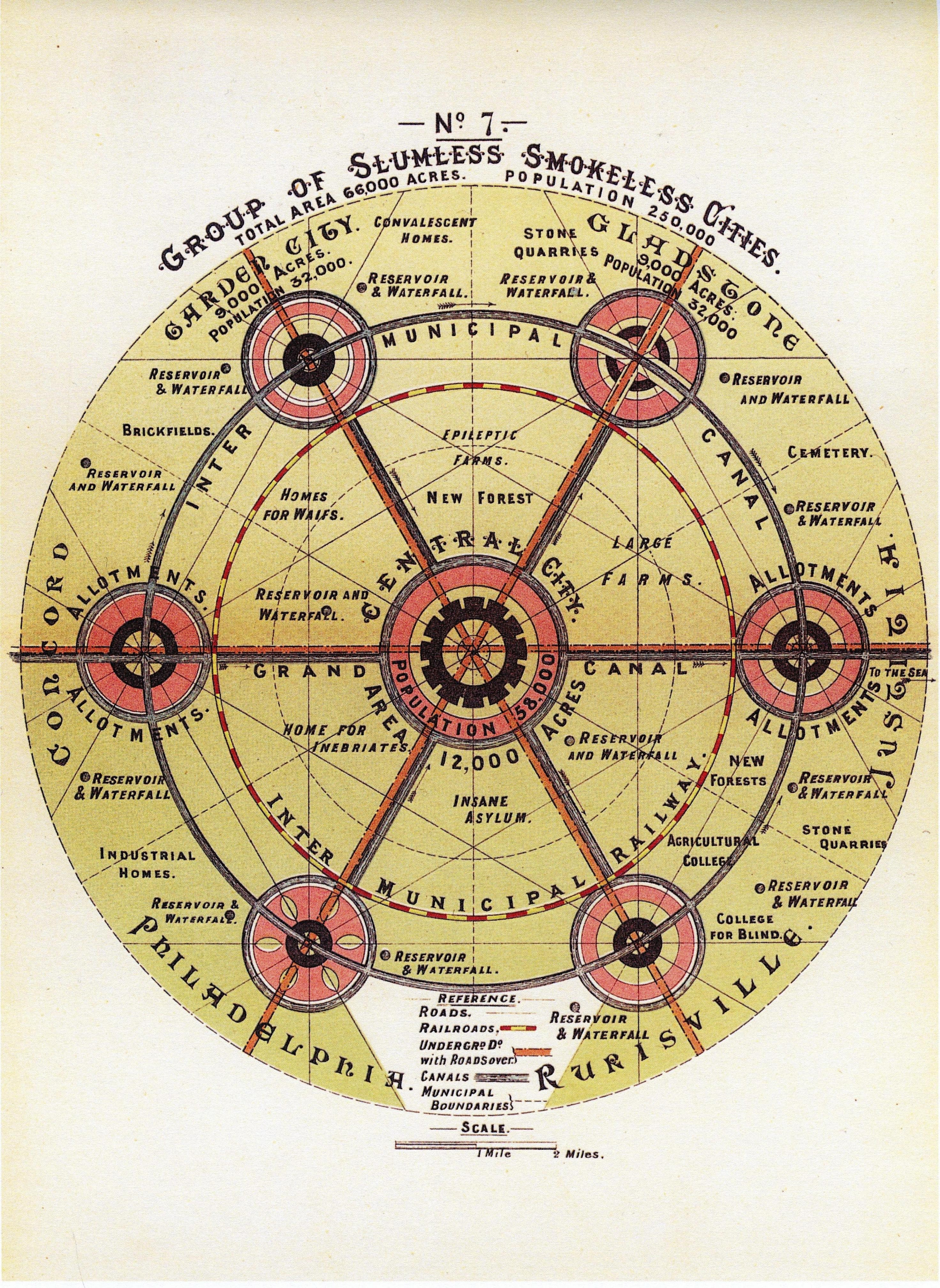
Diagram No.7 (Ebenezer Howard, To-morrow: A Peaceful Path to Real Reform.)

=== Diagrams from the 1902 edition ===
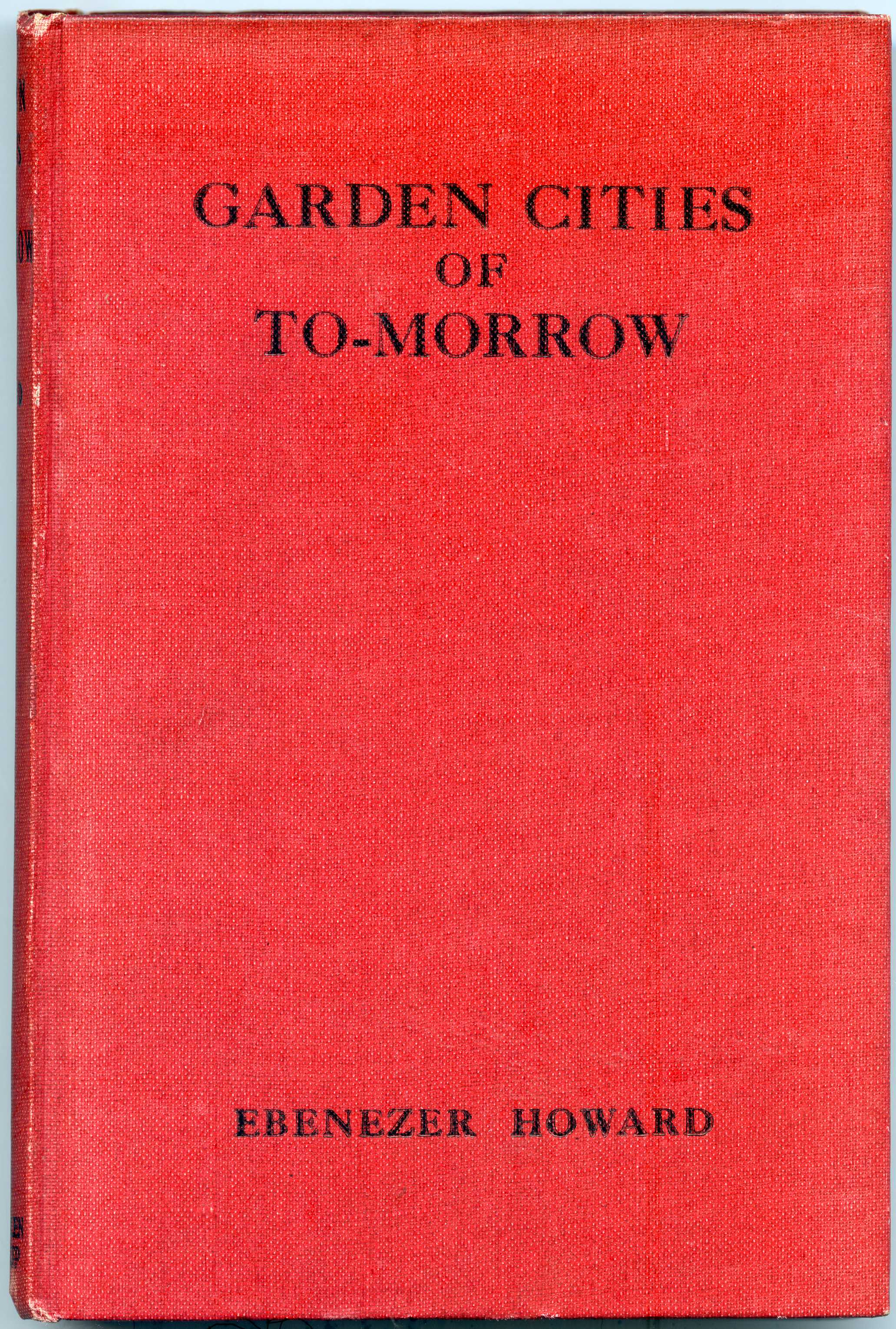
Ebenezer Howard, Garden Cities of To-morrow.

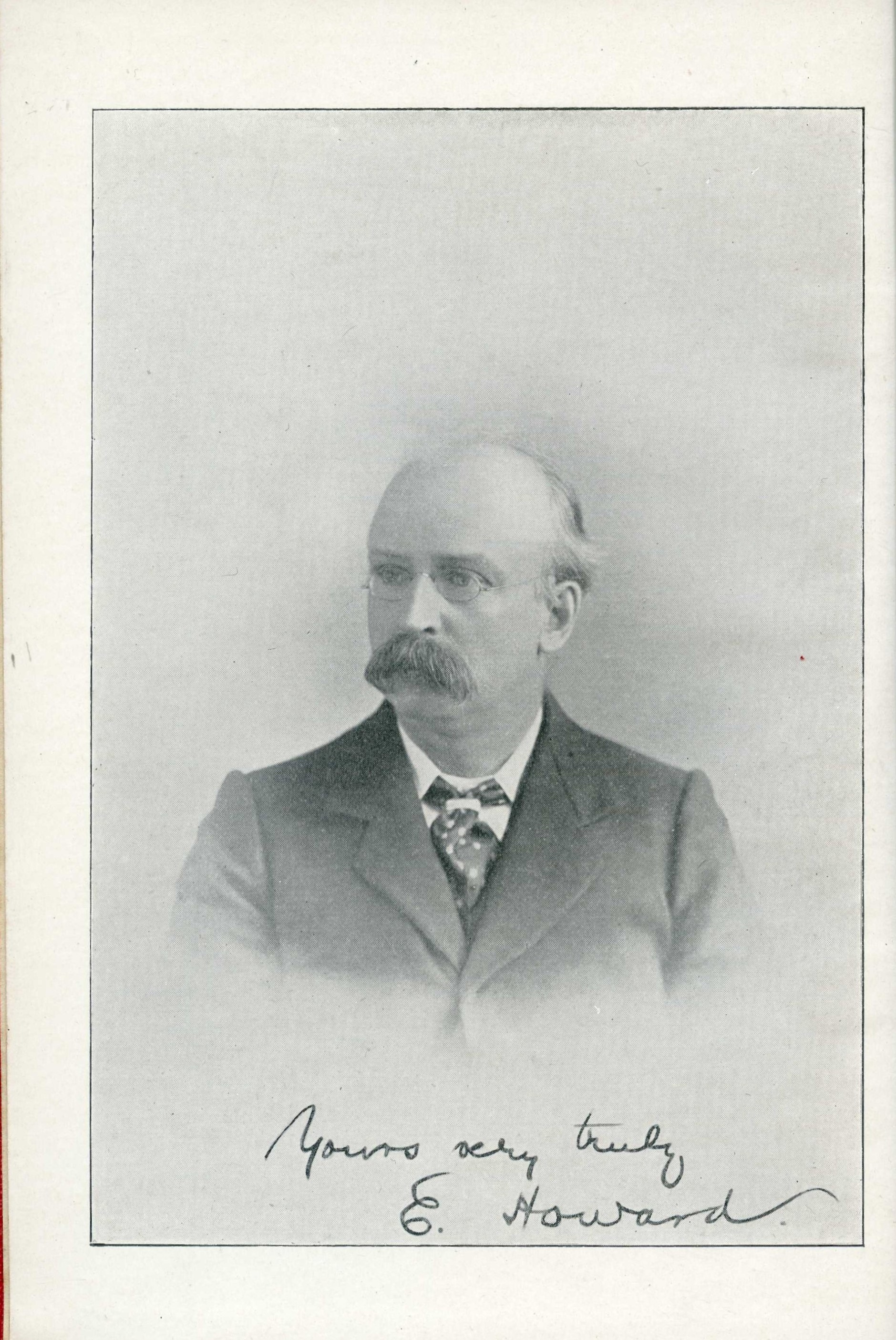
Ebenezer Howard, Garden Cities of To-morrow.

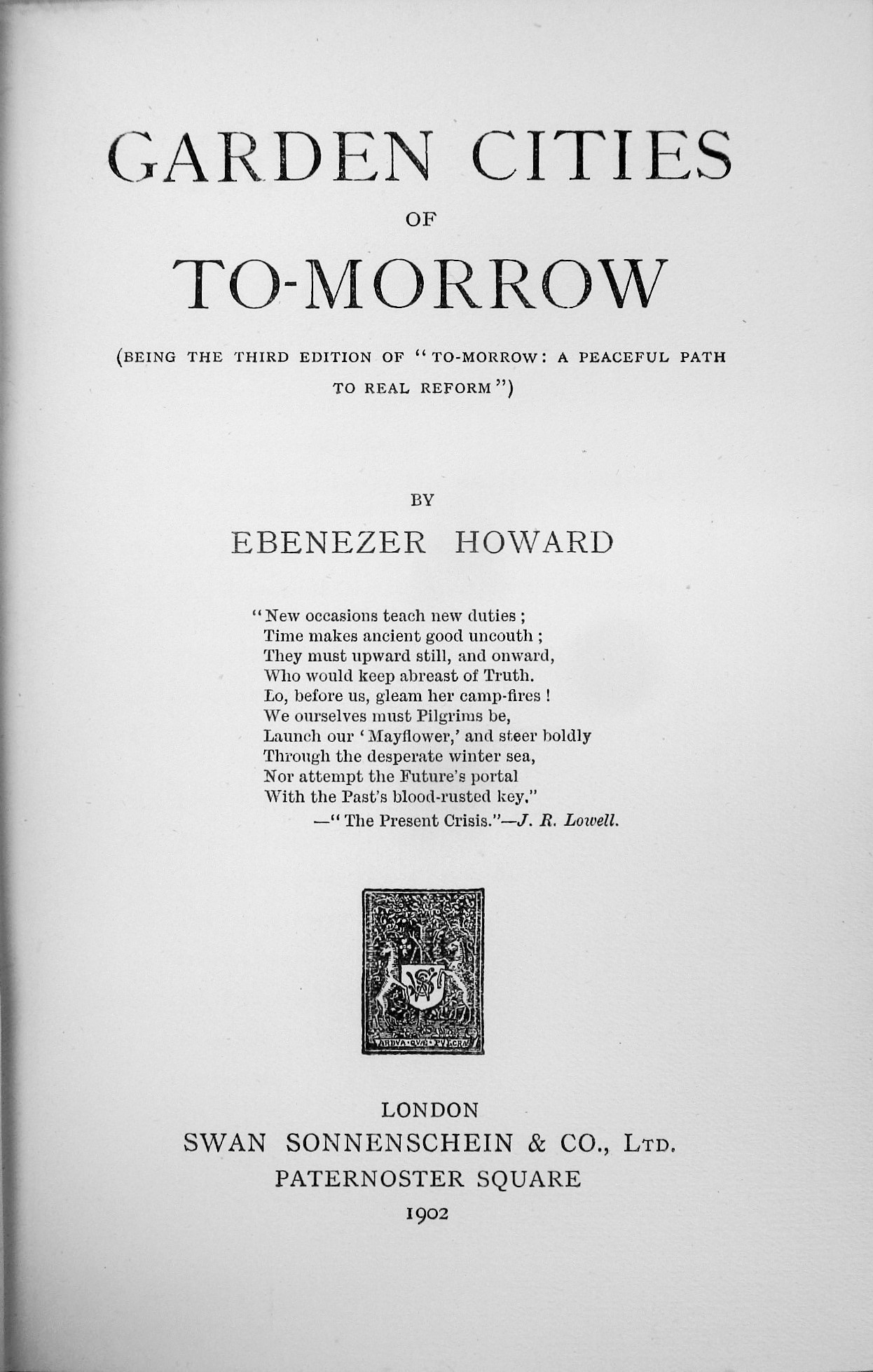
Ebenezer Howard, Garden Cities of To-morrow.

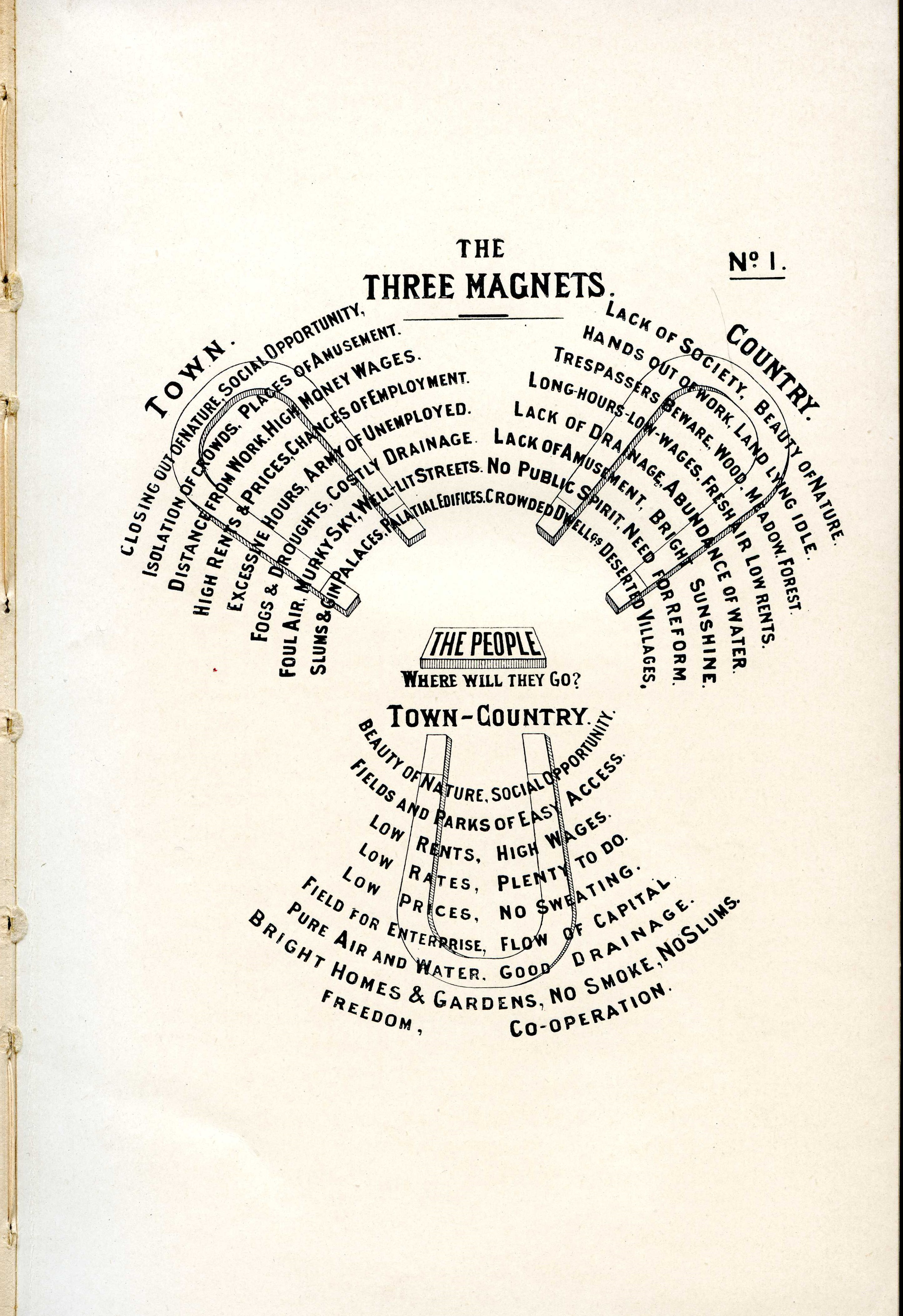
Diagram No.1 (Ebenezer Howard, Garden Cities of To-morrow.)

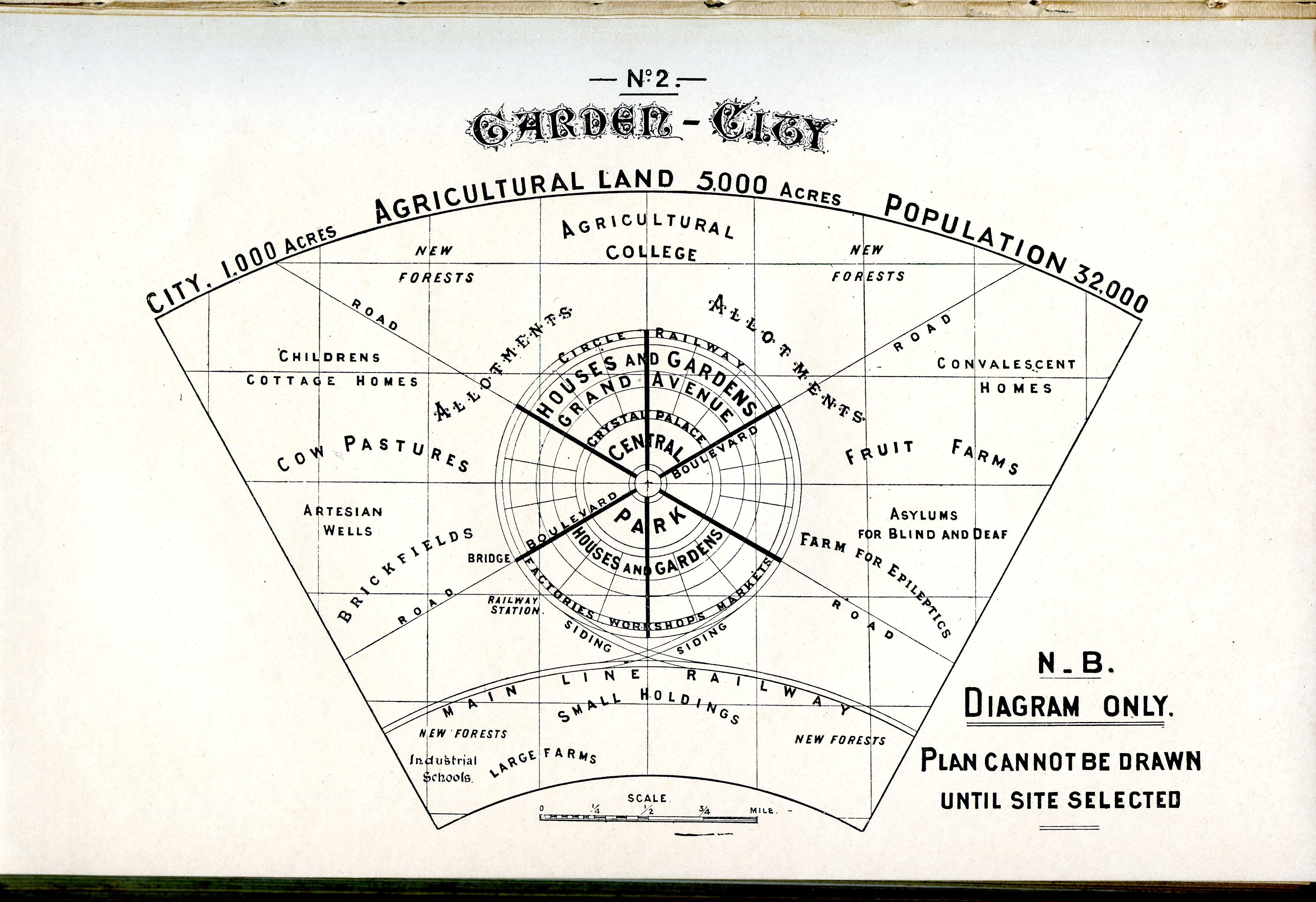
Diagram No.2 (Ebenezer Howard, Garden Cities of To-morrow.)

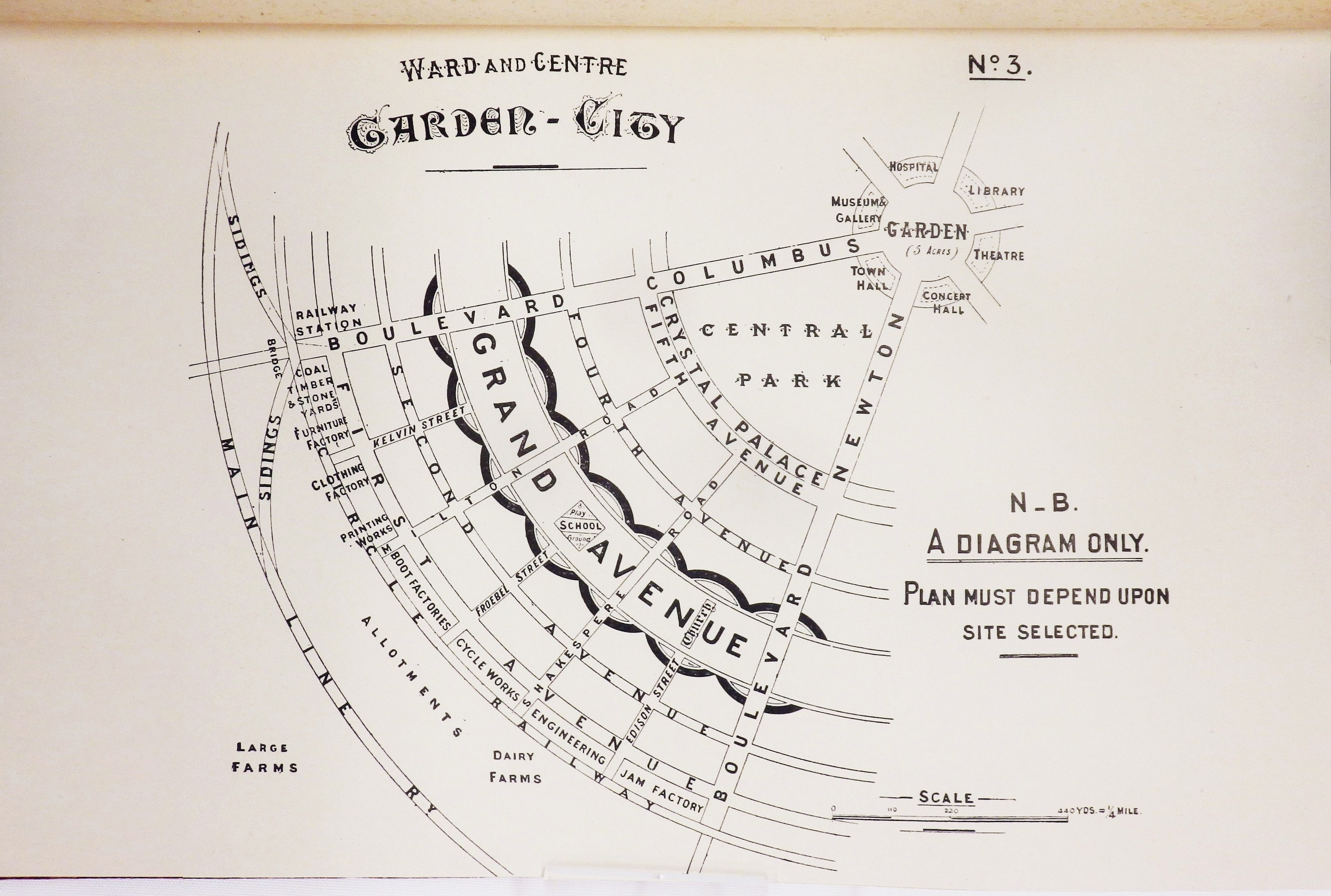
Diagram No.3 (Ebenezer Howard, Garden Cities of To-morrow.)

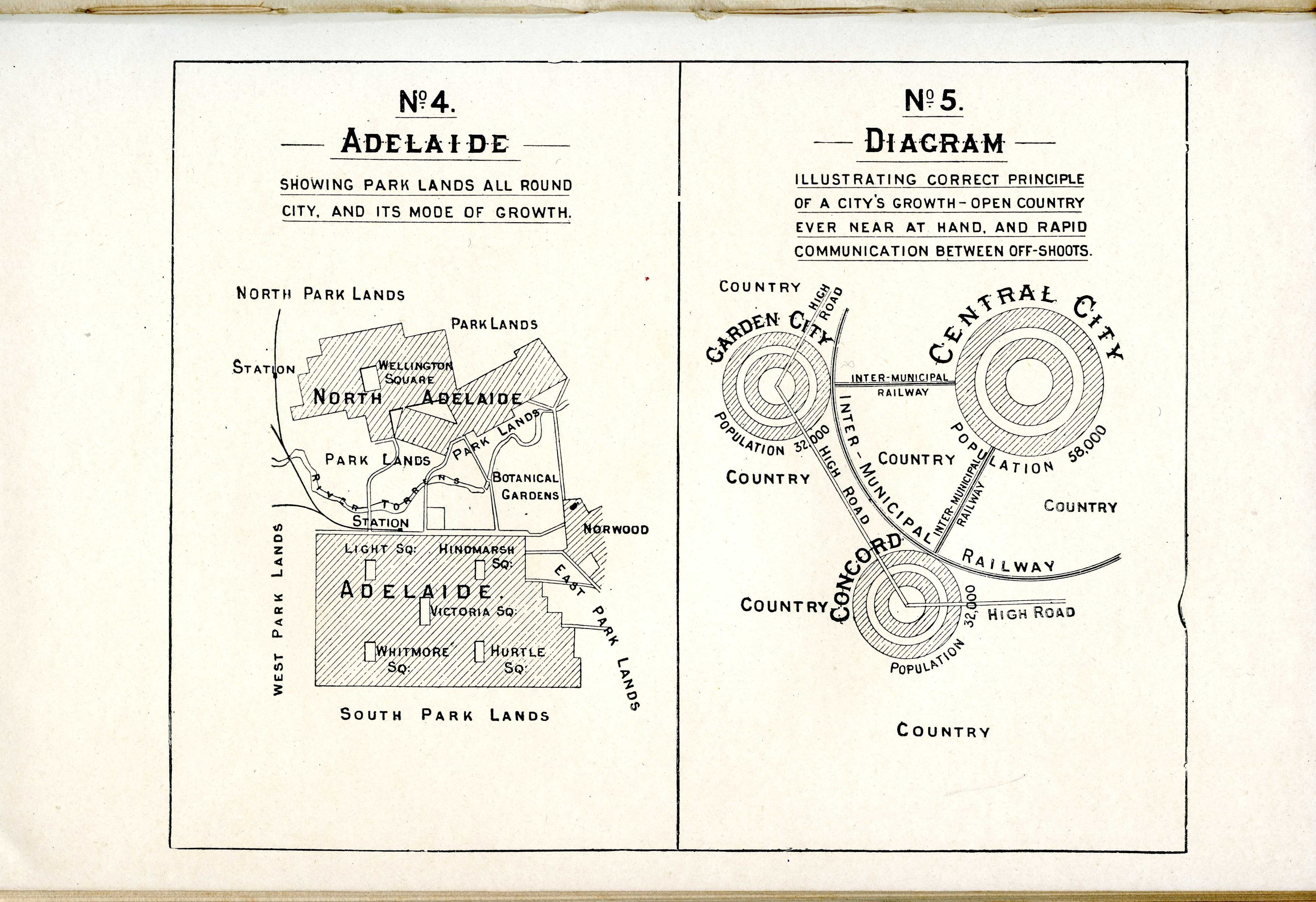
Diagram No.4 (Ebenezer Howard, Garden Cities of To-morrow.)

=== "Den-en Toshi (Garden City)" Tokyo: Hakubunkan, 1907 ===
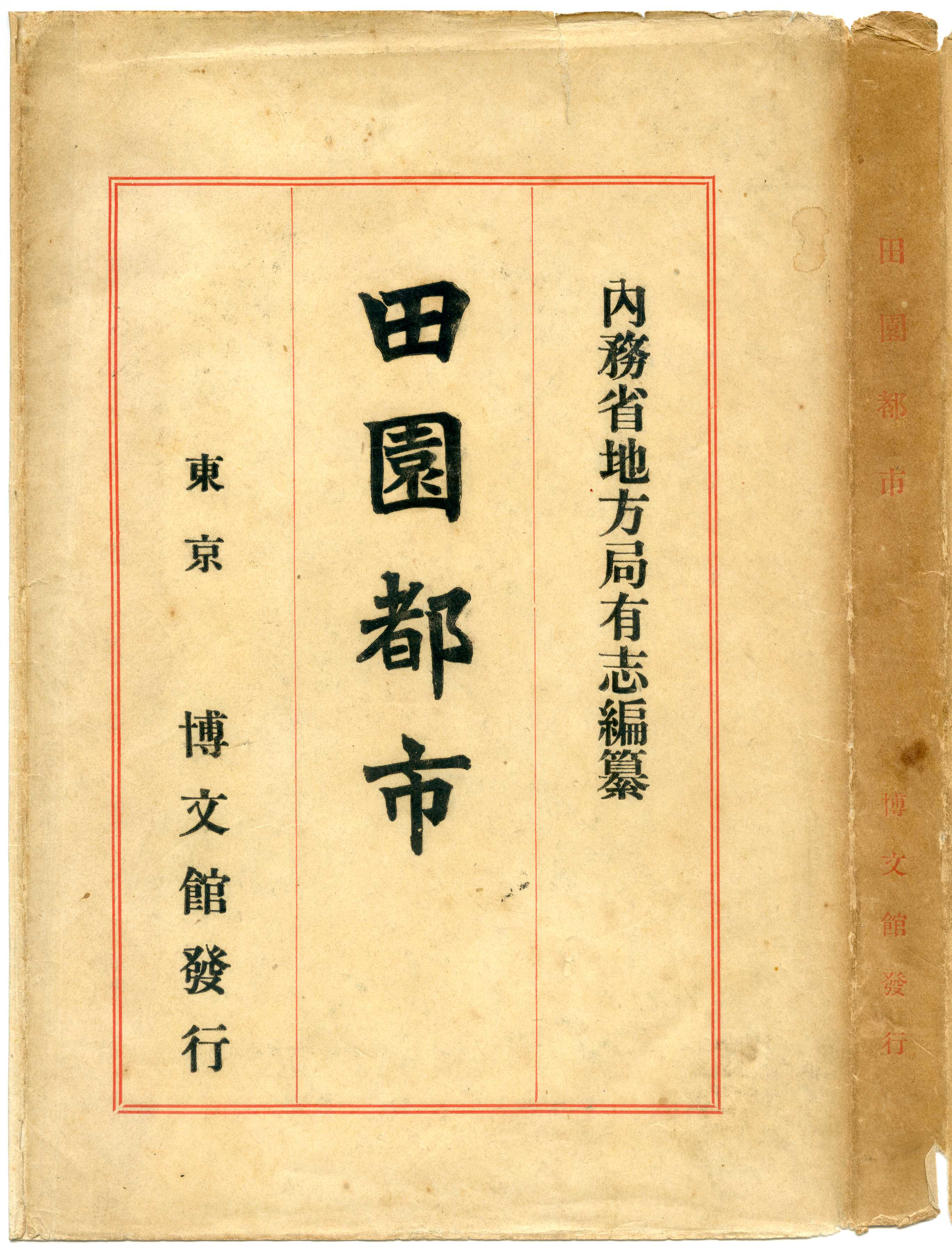
"Den-en Toshi (Garden City)" Tokyo: Hakubunkan, 1907.

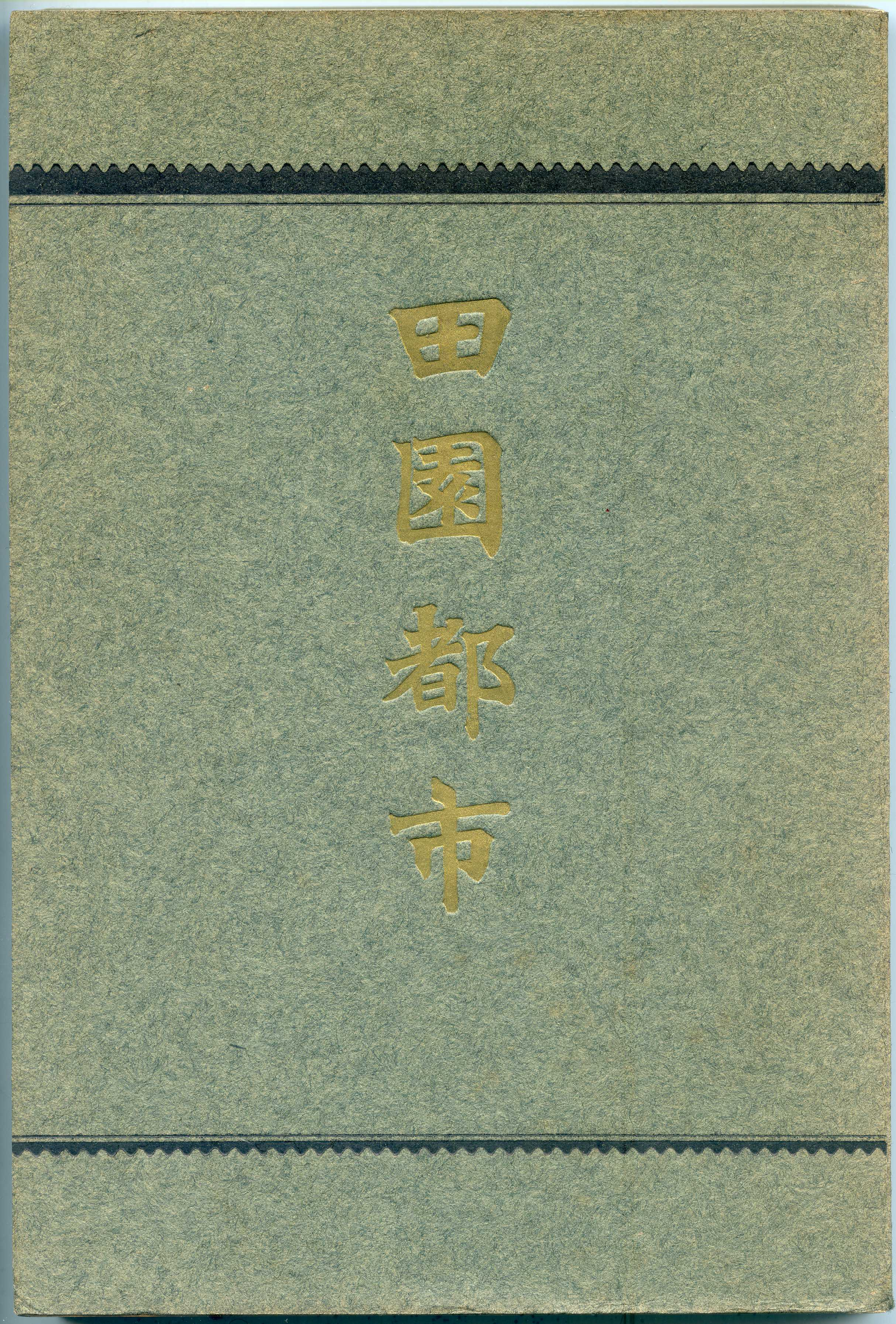
"Den-en Toshi (Garden City)" Tokyo: Hakubunkan, 1907.

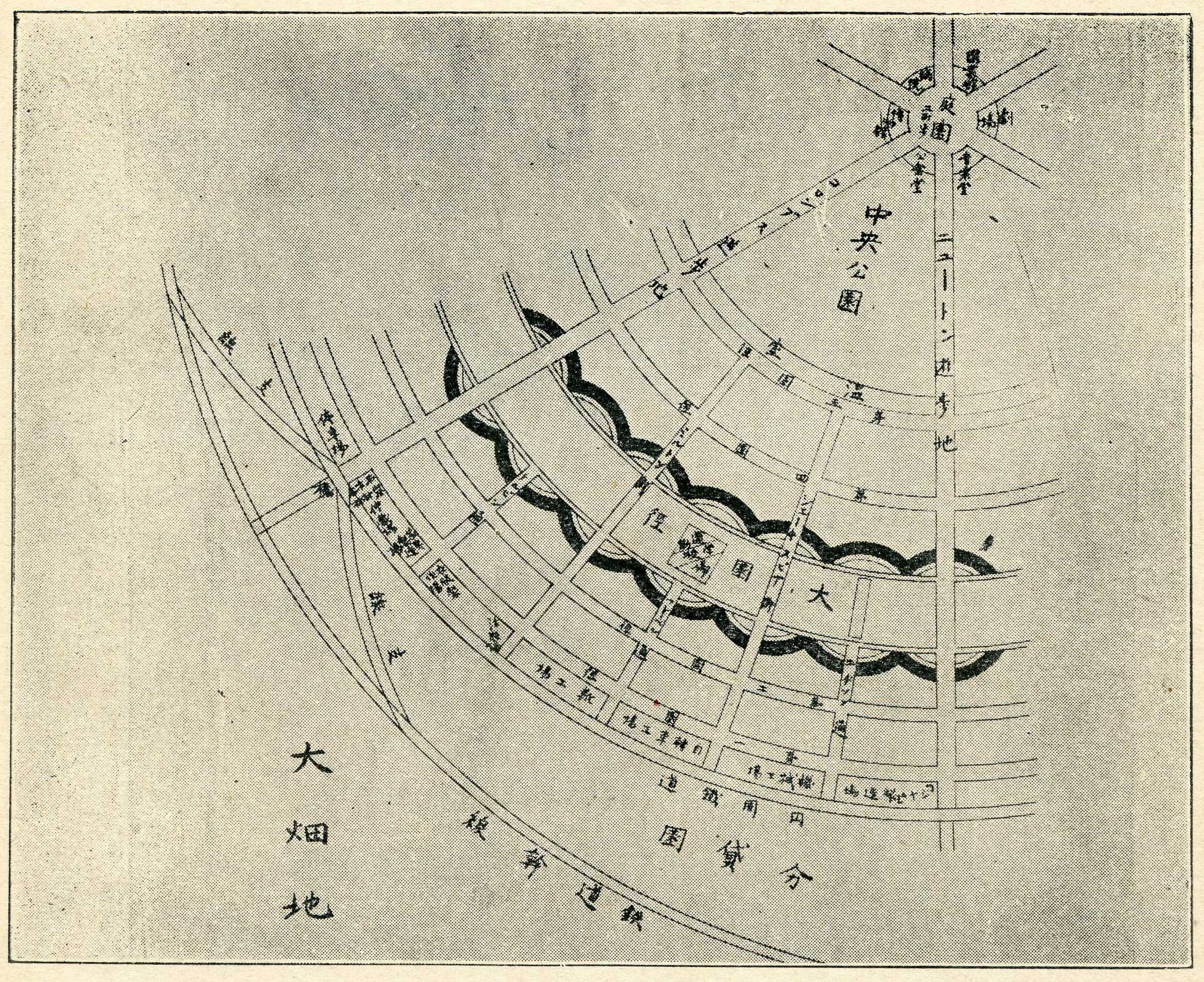
Diagram No.1 ("Den-en Toshi (Garden City)" Tokyo: Hakubunkan, 1907.)

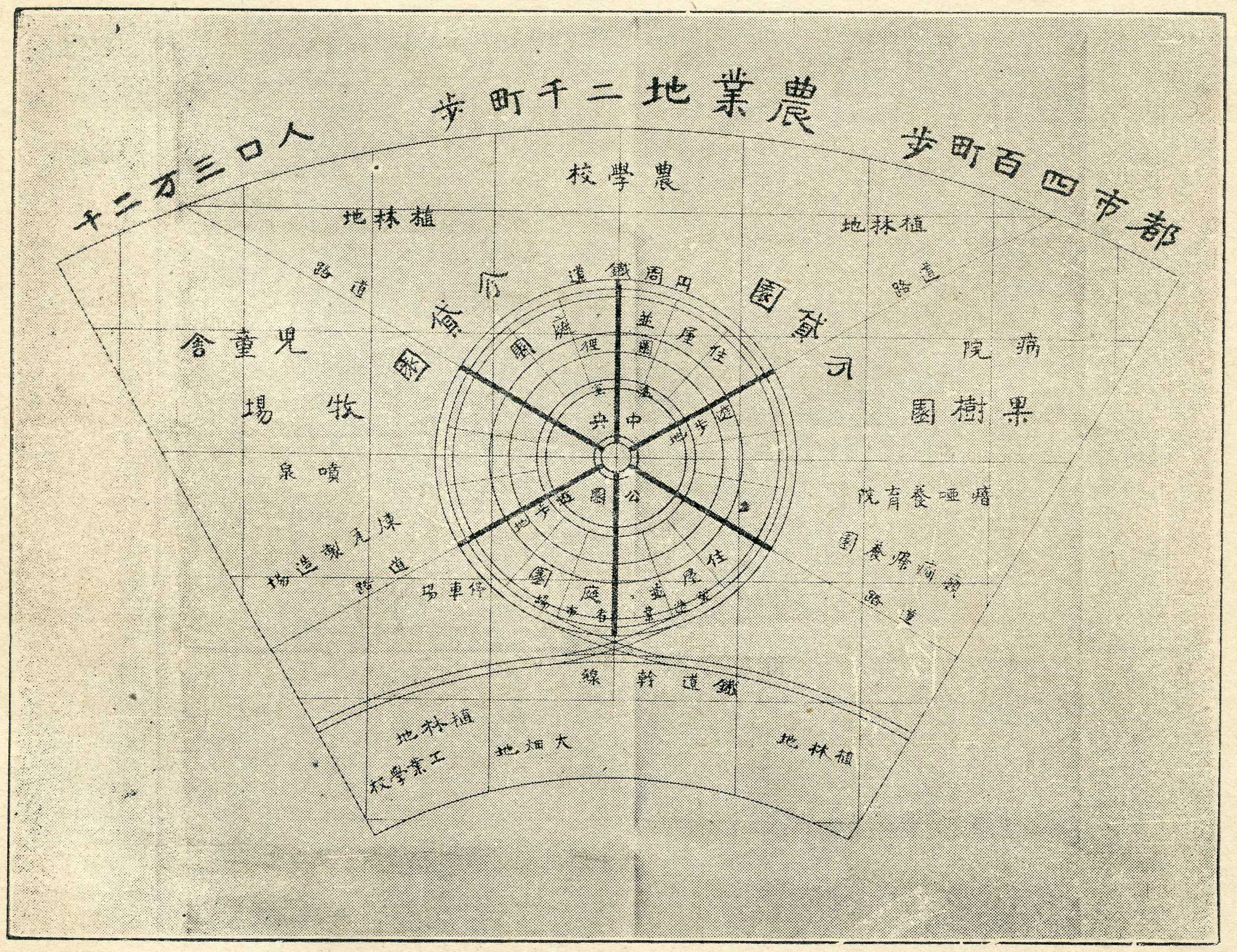
Diagram No.2 ("Den-en Toshi (Garden City)" Tokyo: Hakubunkan, 1907.)

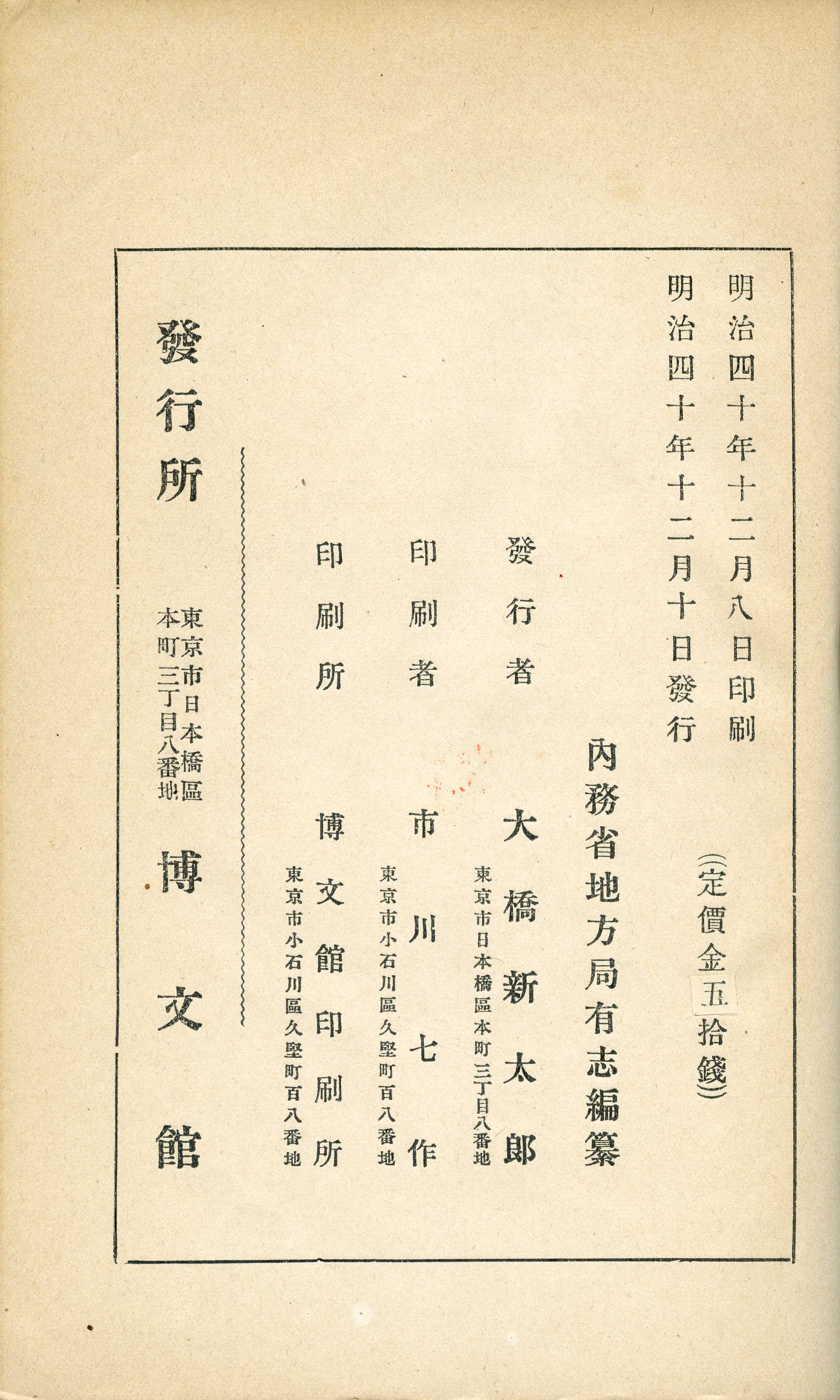
"Den-en Toshi (Garden City)" Tokyo: Hakubunkan, 1907.

== Garden suburbs ==
The concept of garden cities is to produce relatively economically independent cities with short commute times and the preservation of the countryside. Garden suburbs arguably do the opposite. Garden suburbs are built on the outskirts of large cities and have no industrial sections. They are therefore dependent on reliable transport allowing workers to commute into the city. Lewis Mumford, one of Howard's disciples, explained the difference as "The Garden City, as Howard defined it, is not a suburb but the antithesis of a suburb: not a rural retreat, but a more integrated foundation for an effective urban life."

The concept of the garden suburb was familiar enough to English readers that the Leeds newspaper Star of Freedom could claim in 1851 that 'The city of Lassa (i.e. Lhasa) has no wall, but is surrounded by garden suburbs.' However, the planned garden suburb emerged in the west in the late 19th century as a by-product of new types of transportation embraced by a newly prosperous merchant class. The first garden villages were built by English estate owners, who wanted to relocate or rebuild villages on their lands. It was in these cases that architects first began designing small houses. Early examples include Harewood and Milton Abbas. Major innovations that defined early garden suburbs and subsequent suburban town planning include linking villa-like homes with landscaped public spaces and roads.

The planned garden suburb appears to have emerged in England, and the typology soon flowered elsewhere, as evidenced by examples from the second half of the 19th century in the United States. There were generally two garden-suburb typologies: the garden village and the garden enclave. The garden villages are spatially independent of the city but remain connected to it by railroads, streetcars, and, later, automobiles. The villages often included shops and civic buildings. In contrast, garden enclaves are typically strictly residential and emphasize natural and private space rather than public and community space. The urban form of the enclaves was often coordinated through the use of early land use controls typical of modern zoning, including controlled setbacks, landscaping, and materials.

Garden suburbs were not part of Howard's plan and were actually a hindrance to garden city planning. Raymond Unwin, one of Howard's early collaborators on the Letchworth Garden City project in 1907, became very influential in formalizing the garden city principles in the design of garden suburbs through his work Town Planning in Practice: An Introduction to the Art of Designing Cities and Suburbs (1909). The book strongly influenced the Housing, Town Planning, etc. Act 1909, which provided municipalities with the power to develop urban plans for new suburban communities.

Smaller developments were also inspired by the garden city philosophy and were modified to allow for residential "garden suburbs" without the commercial and industrial components of the garden city. They were built on the outskirts of cities, in rural settings. Some notable examples being, in London, Hampstead Garden Suburb, the Sutton Garden Suburb in Benhilton, Sutton, Pinner's Pinnerwood conversation area and the Romford Garden Suburb in Gidea Park and, in Liverpool, Wavertree Garden Suburb. The Gidea Park estate, in particular, was built during two main periods of activity, 1911 and 1934. Both resulted in some good examples of domestic architecture by such architects as Wells Coates and Berthold Lubetkin. Thanks to such strongly conservative residents' associations as the Civic Society, both Hampstead and Gidea Park retain much of their original character. In Bristol, garden suburbs predominated in the interwar period for council housing. However, they were perceived to have some drawbacks, including a lack of community, higher transport/shopping costs, and limited access to work.

Bournville Village Trust in Birmingham, UK, is an important residential development associated with the growth of 'Cadbury's Factory in a Garden'. Here, the Garden City principles are a fundamental part of the Trust's activity. There are strict restrictions on the properties here, such as no stone wall cladding.

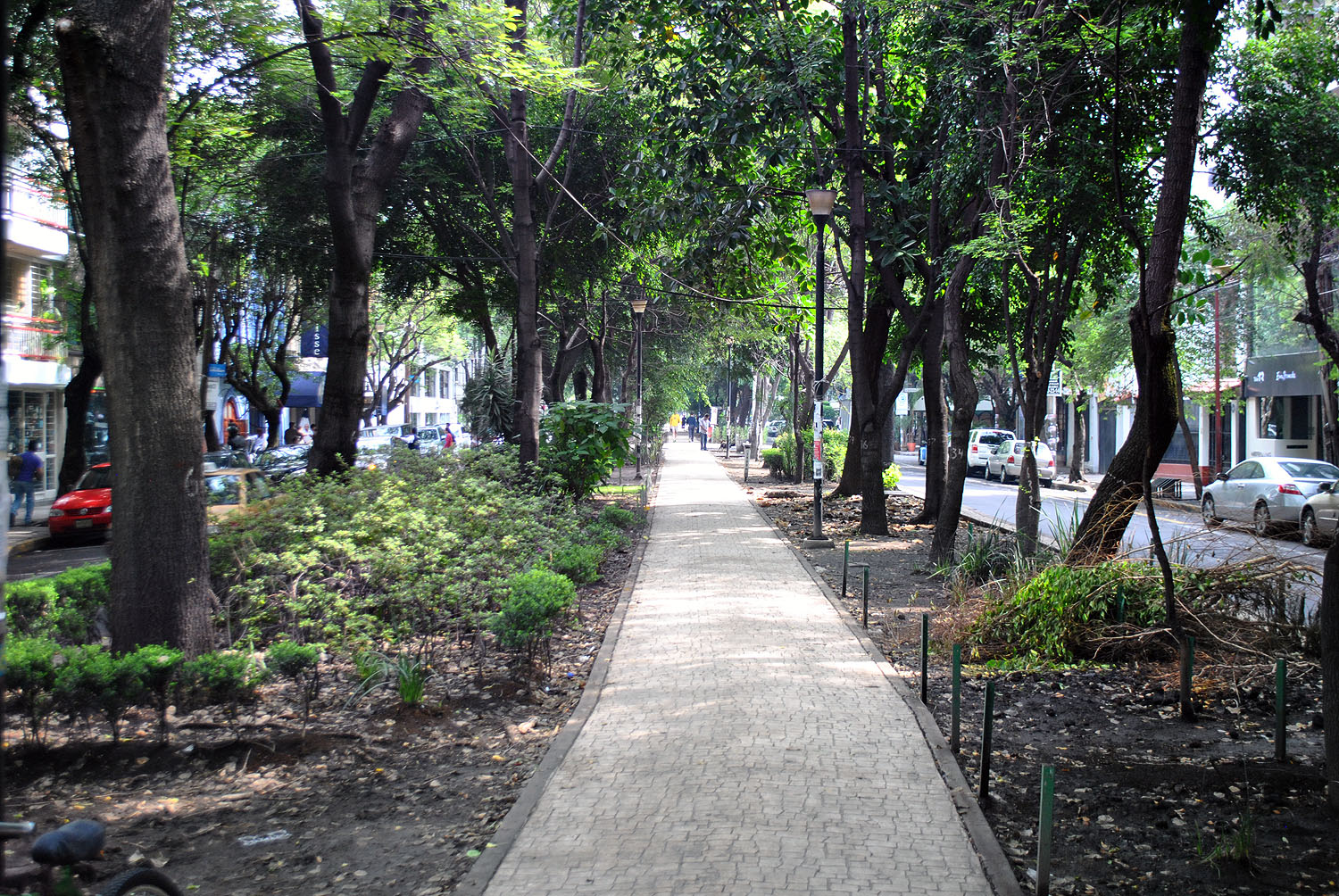
Park median in Avenida Ámsterdam, the "grand avenue" of the Mexico City subdivision Colonia Hipódromo de la Condesa, designed in 1926 and inspired in part by Ebenezer Howard's Garden City

Howard's influence reached as far as Mexico City, where architect José Luis Cuevas was influenced by the garden city concept in the design of two of the most iconic inner-city subdivisions, Colonia Hipódromo de la Condesa (1926) and Lomas de Chapultepec (1928–9):

- In 1926, Colonia Hipódromo (a.k.a. Hipódromo de la Condesa), in what is now known as the Condesa area, including its iconic parks Parque México and Parque España
- In 1928–29, Lomas de Chapultepec

The subdivisions were based on the principles of the garden city as promoted by Ebenezer Howard, including ample parks and other open spaces, park islands in the middle of "grand avenues", such as Avenida Amsterdam in colonia Hipódromo. One unique example of a garden suburb is the Humberstone Garden Suburb in the United Kingdom by the Humberstone Anchor Tenants' Association in Leicestershire, and it is the only garden suburb ever to be built by the members of a workers' co-operative; it remains intact to the present. In 1887, the workers of the Anchor Shoe Company in Humberstone formed a workers' cooperative and built 97 houses.

American architects and partners, Walter Burley Griffin and Marion Mahony Griffin were proponents of the movement and after their arrival in Australia to design the national capital Canberra, they produced a number of garden suburb estates, most notably at Eaglemont with the Glenard and Mount Eagle Estates and the Ranelagh and Milleara Estates in Victoria.

Jewish settlers implemented the idea of garden suburbs in Mandate Palestine and later in Israel, as well as in British- and French-colonial urban areas in Africa.

== See also ==
- Charles Reade
- City Beautiful movement
- Garden buildings
- Greater city movements
- Greening
- Parks and gardens of Barcelona
- Roof garden
- Utopian architecture

Related urban design concepts

- Commuter town
- Ecological urbanism
- EPCOT (concept)
- European Urban Renaissance
- Green belt
- Green urbanism
- Principles of Intelligent Urbanism
- Soviet urban planning ideologies of the 1920s
- Street reclamation
- Subsistence Homesteads Division
- Transit Oriented Development
- Transition Towns
- Urban forest
