= Adelheid Poninska =

Polish-German urban planner

Adelheid Christine Friederike Amalie, née Countess zu Dohna-Schlodien, was a Polish-German social reformer and urban planner. In 1874, she wrote the first comprehensive work on urban planning in German history under the male pseudonym Arminius. Until recently, von Poninska's writings were overlooked in favour of male authors.

Von Poninska was born in East Prussia in 1804 to Wilhelm Count von Dohna-Schlodien and Friederike Countess von Reichenbach-Goschüt. In 1854, she published her first book, Grundzüge eines Systemes der Regeneration der unteren Volksklassen durch Vermittlung der höheren Stände (Basic features of a system of regeneration of the lower classes through the mediation of the higher classes) in which she argued that members of the upper class had responsibilities to the lower classes, such as caring for children, the poor and the sick. Her ideas in this book may have also influenced the garden city movement, and Ebenezer Howard's diagrams bear a resemblance to her suggestions.
