= Welborne, Hampshire =

Town in Hampshire, United Kingdom

Coordinates: 50.874°N 1.190°W

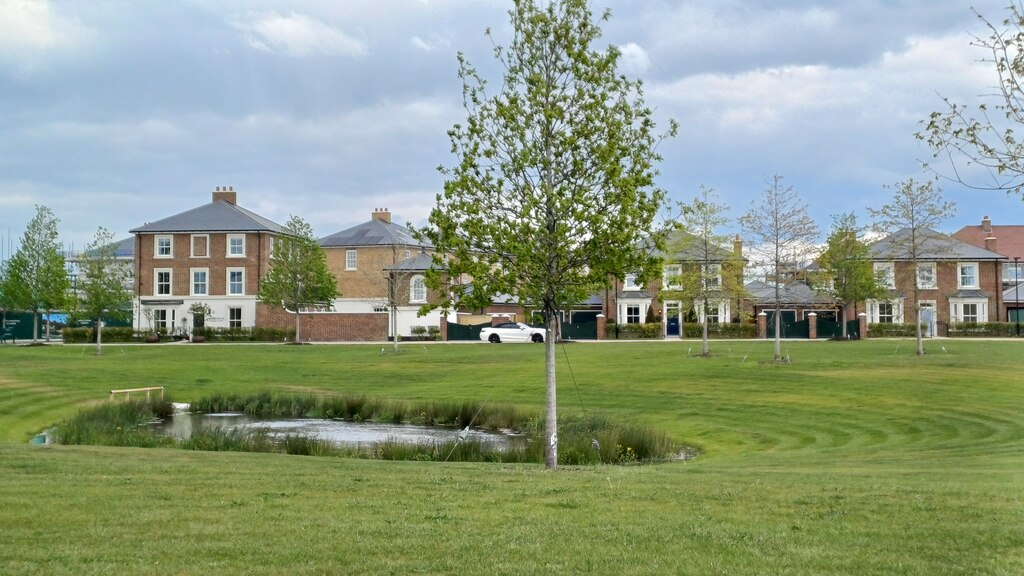
The first houses to be built in Welborne, in May 2025

Welborne is a town under construction to the north of Fareham, England. It is intended to include 6,000 houses with businesses and community facilities. A plan for the development was submitted for central Government examination on 23 June 2014, and modifications were published in January 2015 following the inspector's preliminary comments. Fareham Borough Council formally adopted the plan for Welborne as part of its statutory Local Plan for the Borough on 8 June 2015. Welborne is set to become a garden town.

Construction is scheduled in phases between 2015 and 2036, and as of 2019 the town was due to be completed by 2038. Transport plans include an upgrade to Junction 10 of the M27 motorway and a bus rapid transit route.

Welborne is being developed by Buckland Group, and construction of the first phase is being delivered by Thakeham, CG Fry and Pye Homes. The first homes were completed in April 2025, and the first residents moved into the new houses in October 2025. Around 700 homes are being built on the first phase of the site, named Chesterfield Village, along with a Hampshire County Council-run primary school and village centre.

== Plan ==
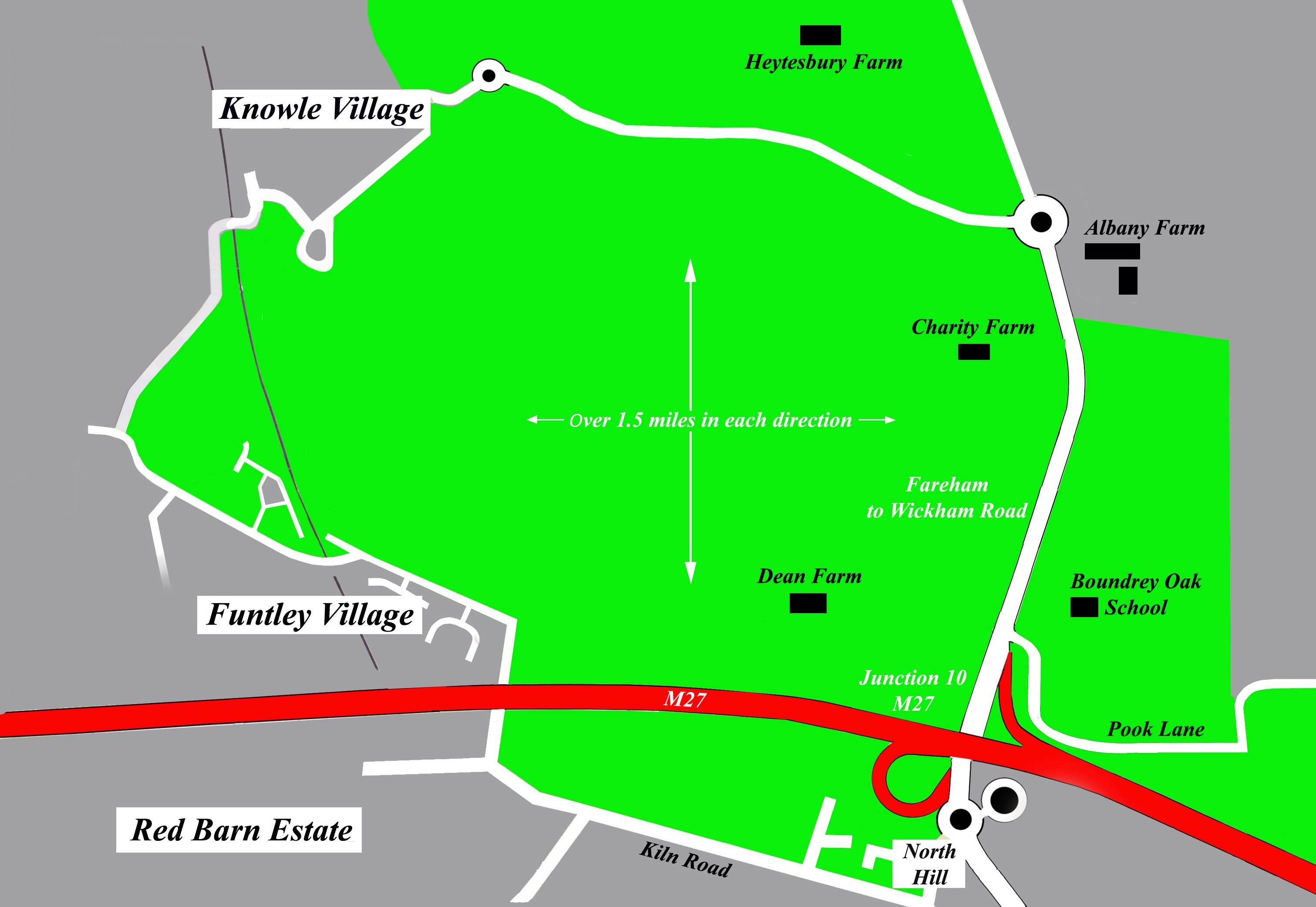
Plan of the new town's location, as of 2014. The area in green is the land that Fareham Borough Council intend to turn into housing and industry.

The Planning Inspectorate Hearings into Welborne took place in 2014. By 2022 building was yet to start, with the completion date for the first houses having become scheduled for 2023/24. On 6 June 2022 the Planning Inspectorate examined the 2037 Fareham Local Plan, and in the post-hearing letter noted that he considered completion of the first Welborne houses by 2023/24 to be "overly ambitious" and that the site "should be pushed back a year in the trajectory".

Fareham Borough Council voted to impose Compulsory Purchase Orders on landowners on the planned site in 2016. The council expressed concern in 2018 that the planned houses could be unaffordable A submitted design for the site was rejected by the Planning Inspectorate in 2018, over concerns that the area's infrastructure would be inadequate.

In August 2023 the developers announced that three regional builders had been selected to build out the first phase comprising 600 homes. These were Thakeham, CG Fry & Son and Pye Homes who have been selected under a “partnership” model, meaning they will not be required to pay up front for the land. Payment will only have to pay for the sites once the completed homes are sold on to new residents.

By December 2023, the energy centre which was to house the electricity supply for the proposed 6,000 homes had gained consent. However, in the same month, a report revealed that Hampshire County Council was "extremely unlikely" to be able to fund the revisions proposed to junction 10 of the M27 without further funding. The council then confirmed that no further funding was anticipated from National Highways or the Department for Transport throwing the junction scheme into doubt. The spending of £113.5 million on the plans for Junction 10 were eventually given the go ahead by Hampshire County Council in January 2025, with funding being provided by Buckland Group.

== Local responses ==
In 2011, a petition with 1,400 signatures objecting to a new town was submitted to the Council. In 2017, the Campaign to Protect Rural England spoke out against the building of Welborne, describing the site as "a natural barrier from the urban sprawl of the Solent cities" and calling for the area to be designated a green belt.
