= Greater city movements =

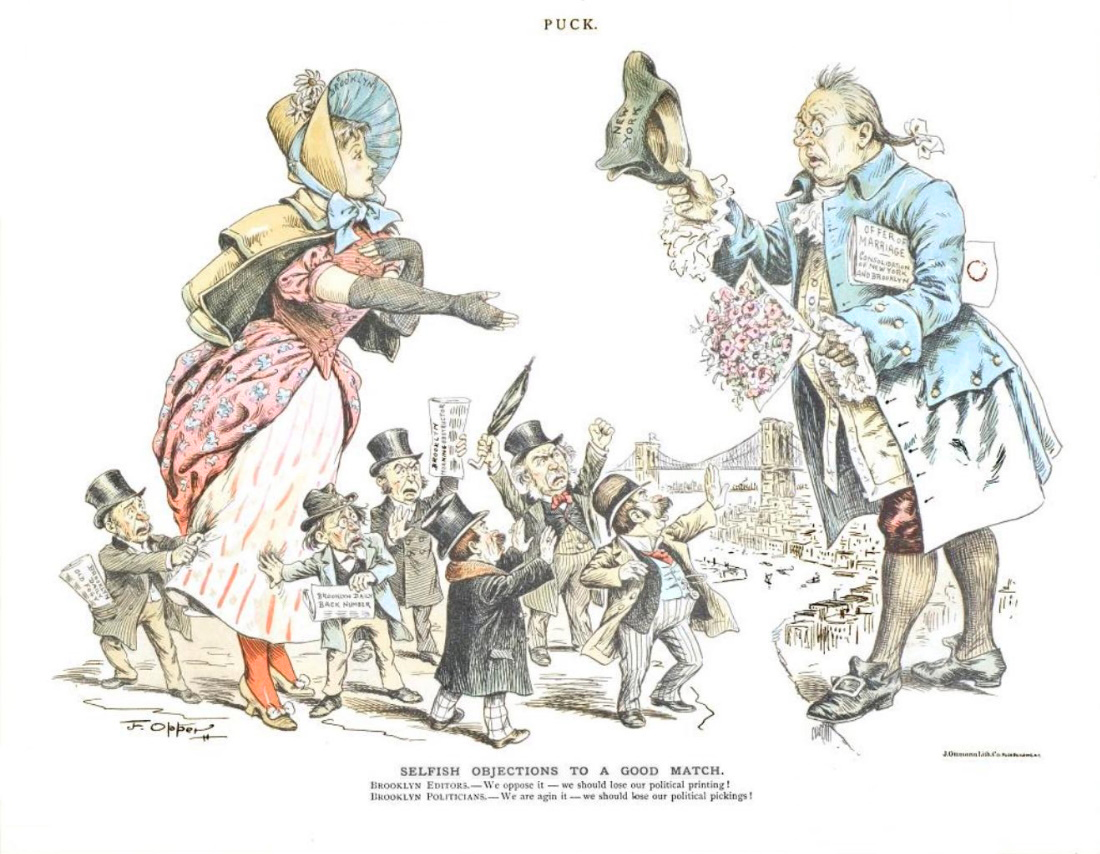
1893 political cartoon illustrating the opposition in Brooklyn to the creation of a greater City of New York.

A greater city movement refers to various reform efforts—both contemporary and historical—to expand the municipal boundaries of a primate central city to incorporate all, or part, of the surrounding metropolitan population. Historically, greater city movements were proposed as a solution to the problem of metropolitan planning and administration. Today, the concept has been largely discredited for political reasons Historically, examples of cities that have successfully expanded their boundaries to include the entire metropolitan population are extremely rare, and as a general principle few, if any cities worldwide have been able to maintain a continuous process of boundary adjustment to include surrounding areas of population growth.

The greater city movements of the early twentieth century grew out of concern for improving urban health, efficiency and aesthetics. They also reflected the longstanding historical understanding of cities as a politically unified entity. Larger municipal governments with greater resources were seen as a means for implementing the ideas of municipal socialism, City beautiful and the garden city.

Greater city movements are distinct from "regionalism" movements, which seek to create an additional tier of regional metropolitan government (Such as Grand Paris in 2016).

== Examples ==
=== Australia ===
In Australia the movement led to the creation of a greater Brisbane (1925) which is considered the only true implantation of the "greater city" model. More limited successes were achieved in Newcastle (1938) and Perth (1914–1917). Elsewhere, including Melbourne and Sydney, the movement was entirely unsuccessful and today, the idea of large, metropolitan local authorities coordinating development, infrastructure, financing is rarely identified as a model for urban and regional planning. Examples of successful and partially successful movements include the following:

- Perth: The amalgamation of several inner city municipalities occurred between 1914 and 1917, but was reversed by the state government in 1993. Efforts to encourage an amalgamation of the City of Perth and the City of Vincent failed in 2013 although the City of Perth was expanded to include the University of Western Australia and surrounding neighbourhood.
- Brisbane (1924): The only truly successful implementation of the greater city movement in Australia.
- Newcastle (1937)
- Wollongong (1947)

=== Canada ===
- Toronto: Seven municipalities were amalgamated into the City of Toronto in 1997.

=== United Kingdom ===
- Glasgow
- Birmingham: The city was expanded to include adjoining districts in 1891, 1909, 1911, 1928, 1931 and 1974.
- London: The London County Council was created in 1889.

=== United States ===
- New York: The creation of the City of Greater New York in 1898.
