= Beringen coal preparation plant =

- Kolenwasserij en Zeverij van Beringen
- Location within Belgium

General information
- Type: Industrial
- Location: Koersel, Beringen, Limburg, Belgium, Koolmijnlaan 201, Beringen, Belgium
- Coordinates: 51°4′10″N 5°13′28″E
- Construction started: 1923
- Completed: 1924
- Renovated: started from 2010
- Renovation cost: € 40 million estimated
- Owner: NV Mijnen (LRM)

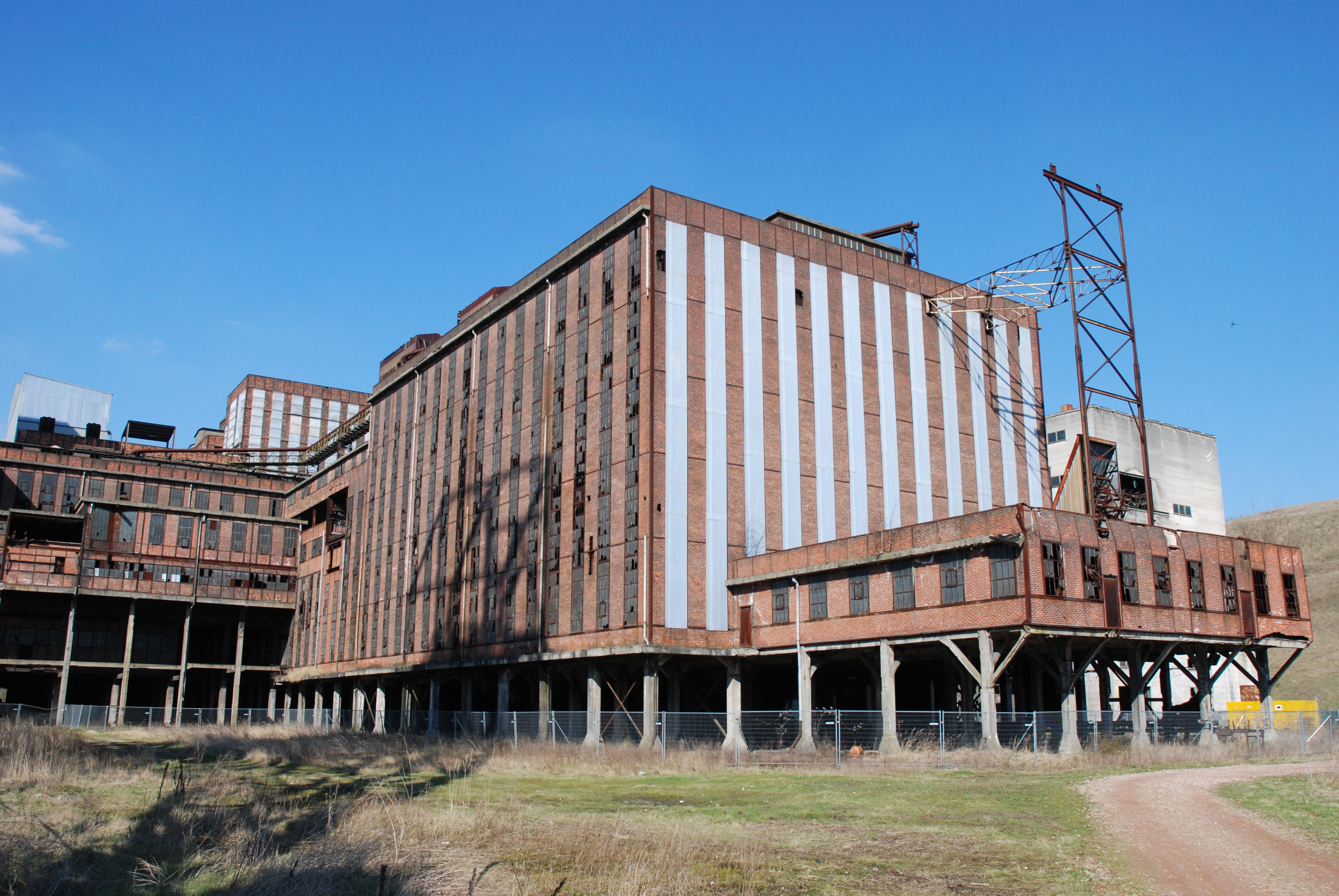
The Beringen coal preparation plant, 2009

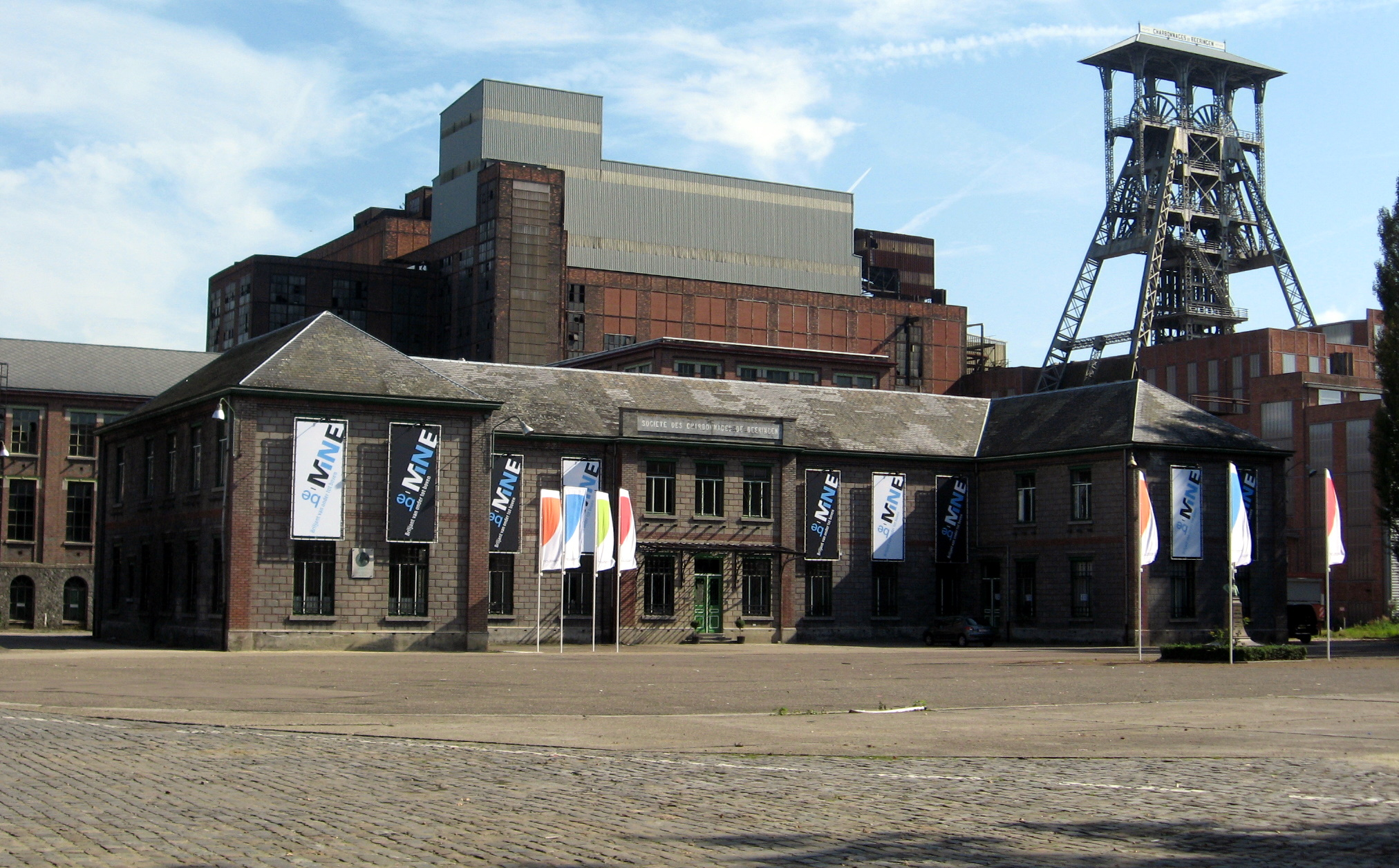
The Beringen coal washery behind the central offices

The Beringen coal preparation plant is a part of the former Beringen coal mine, which is located in Beringen in the Belgian province of Limburg. Since 1994, the building has been selected and protected as mining heritage by the Flemish government, and is planned to be reused as part of the Flemish Mining Museum. The mining site of Beringen was one of the Belgian anchor points of the ERIH (European Route of Industrial Heritage). A coal preparation plant (Dutch: Kolenwasserij, French: Triage-Lavoir) separates the usable coal from the waste rock. This coal preparation plant is one of the biggest and last vast examples of the Belgian coal industry.

== Functionality ==
After its excavation, the coal has to be sorted out from the waste rock before being sold. This task became, except from digging, one of the main activities of a colliery. In Beringen the coal preparation plant started operation in September 1924, two years after the mine itself went into production. Since then the capacity of coal preparation was expanded several times, and finally reached a production of 7,500 tonnes a day, 20 times the equivalent of the coal preparation plant of the Blegny-Trembleur mine in Wallonia.

== Reclamation ==
In 1989, when the mine closed, this building was about to be torn down as it seemed too big for adaptive reuse. Furthermore, its structure contains plenty of reusable valuable metals. Therefore, it is a quite difficult task to find a suitable adaptive reuse for coal washery plants. This is the very reason why there are not many coal preparation plants left on the sites of former European collieries.

This building was selected and protected by Flemish minister Johan Sauwens in 1994, and was redesignated as a mining monument within the Flemish Mining Museum. In August 2010, the Flemish government handed out 1.39 million euros for the restoration of that building, which will become one of the strengths of the ERIH.

Nevertheless, in the spring of 2013, the owner applied to the Flemish government to abolish the plant. However, under an international outcry from heritage organizations, the Ministry cabinet of Geert Bourgeois decided in July, not only on its conservation, but also on the restoration of the building. Therefore, a fund of 15.9 million euros was offered. By this move, only several little parts of the coal washery, which have been added recently, can be demolished.

== International value ==
As mentioned above, since coal preparation plants are often the first to be demolished after a mine closure, there are not much of them left in Western Europe. Therefore, the site of the former coal mine of Beringen is one of the happy few within the ERIH-network.

The building stile of this plant is monolithic. It is a ten-story building, raised in metal with walls consisting of two bays in glass interspersed by a bay in brick masonry. It has been built upon palisades above railways in order to load the coal.

== Popular culture ==
The theme of the Beringen coal preparation plant has already been picked up by two international nominated photographers:

- Danny Veys COALFACE gallery, ‘Triage de Beeringen’, 12 June – 3 September 2008.
- Jonny Vekemans, Japan (Iwamizawa Coal Mine Heritage Management Center) ‘Het licht is uit‘, 16 June – 29 July 2013.

== See also ==
Bois du Cazier
